= Live at the Fillmore (Cypress Hill album) =

Live album by Cypress Hill
- Released: December 12, 2000
- Recorded: August 16, 2000
- Venue: The Fillmore, San Francisco
- Genre: Hip-hop; nu metal; rap metal
- Length: 1:05:02
- Label: Ruffhouse; Columbia
- Producer: DJ Muggs

Cypress Hill chronology
Skull & Bones (2000)	Live at the Fillmore (2000)	Stoned Raiders (2001)

Live at the Fillmore is a live album by American band Cypress Hill. It was recorded at The Fillmore in San Francisco on August 16, 2000 and released on December 12, 2000 through Ruffhouse/Columbia Records. Production was handled by member DJ Muggs. It contains several songs performed from the group's previous studio albums: Cypress Hill, Black Sunday, IV and Skull & Bones with the exception for the songs from III: Temples of Boom. It features contributions from members of SX-10. In the United States, the album peaked at No. 119 on the Billboard 200 and No. 72 on the Top R&B/Hip-Hop Albums. It also reached No. 47 in Austria and No. 82 in Switzerland.

== Reception ==
Professional ratings
Review scores
Source	Rating
AllMusic	3.5/5 stars
laut.de	3/5 stars
NME	3.5/5 stars

- Rolling Stone - 3.5 stars out of 5 - "B-Real, Sen Dog, Bobo and DJ Muggs are in top form here."
- Q magazine - 3 out of 5 stars - "Captures [them] in somewhat ebullient mood…on the pumped and primed beats…they sound at their most relaxed and…their most potent."
- Melody Maker - 4 stars out of 5 - "Intense lunacy and sonic dementia.… It must've been mad - absolutely insane."
- NME - 7 out of 10 - "The frenzy of the crowd feeds back into the immediacy of the performance and - Boom Shanka! And there are moments of such delicious madness here."

== Track listing ==
No.	Title	Writer(s)	Length
1.	"Hand on the Pump"	Louis Freese; Lawrence Muggerud; Brett Bouldin	3:55
2.	"Real Estate"	Freese; Senen Reyes; Muggerud	3:17
3.	"How I Could Just Kill a Man"	Freese; Reyes; Muggerud	3:22
4.	"Insane in the Brain"	Freese; Reyes; Muggerud	3:36
5.	"Pigs"	Freese; Muggerud	2:34
6.	"Looking Through the Eye of a Pig"	Freese; Muggerud	8:02
7.	"Cock the Hammer"	Freese; Reyes; Muggerud	3:43
8.	"Checkmate"	Freese; Reyes; Muggerud	3:30
9.	"Can't Get the Best of Me"	Freese; Reyes; Eric Correa; Muggerud; Brad Wilk	3:59
10.	"Lick a Shot"	Freese; Reyes; Muggerud	3:36
11.	"A to the K"	Freese; Reyes; Muggerud	4:55
12.	"I Ain't Goin' Out Like That"	Freese; Muggerud; Todd Ray	3:37
13.	"I Wanna Get High"	Freese; Reyes; Muggerud	2:11
14.	"Stoned Is the Way of the Walk"	Freese; Muggerud	1:58
15.	"Hits from the Bong"	Freese; Reyes; Muggerud	2:52
16.	"Riot Starter"	Freese; Reyes; Muggerud	3:49
17.	"(Rock) Superstar"	Freese; Reyes; Muggerud	6:06
18.	"Checkmate (Hang 'Em High Remix)" (Secret track)	Freese; Reyes; Muggerud	4:01
19.	"Can't Stop Won't Stop" (Limited Edition Bonus Track)		3:29
Total length:			1:05:02

Sample credits

- Track 3 contains a sample of "Tramp" composed by Louis Fulson and Jimmy McCracklin

== Personnel ==
- Louis "B-Real" Freese – vocals
- Senen "Sen Dog" Reyes – vocals
- Lawrence "DJ Muggs" Muggerud – arranger, producer, mixing
- Eric "Bobo" Correa – drums
- Andy Zambrano – guitar (tracks: 6–12, 16, 17)
- Jeremy Fleener – guitar (tracks: 6–12, 16, 17)
- Frank Mercurio – bass (tracks: 6–12, 16, 17)
- Troy Staton – mixing, live mobile recording
- Richard McKernan – live mobile recording
- Doug Field – live mobile recording assistant
- Jay Resnick – live mobile recording assistant
- Phil Kneebone – live mobile recording assistant
- Mike Gonzales – live board engineer
- Westwood One – mobile recording
- Brian "Big Bass" Gardner – mastering
- Arlene Owseichik – art direction
- Estevan "Scandalous" Oriol – design, photography
- Mark "Mr. Cartoon" Machado – design
- Sonny Gerasimowicz – design
- D. Sean MacDonald – artwork
- Gerard Babitts – A&R
- Paul D. Rosenberg – management
- Cara Lewis – booking
- Scott Thomas – booking
- Jim Halogen – booking
- Theo Sedlmayr – legal
- Paul Furedi – editing

== Charts ==
Chart (2000)	Peak position
Austrian Albums (Ö3 Austria)	47
Swiss Albums (Schweizer Hitparade)	82
US Billboard 200	119
US Top R&B/Hip-Hop Albums (Billboard)	72
