= Diary of a Mad Dog =

Studio album by Sen Dog
- Released: September 30, 2008
- Recorded: 2007–2008
- Genre: West Coast hip hop; gangsta rap; hardcore hip hop
- Length: 57:32
- Label: Suburban Noize Records
- Producer: Brad Xavier (exec.); Kevin Zinger (exec.); DJ Ace; Kumagai; Underrated; B-Real; DJ Khalil; Anti; Jeffery Simmins Jr.; Pharmacist Chris; Rogelio Lozano

Sen Dog chronology
Ghetto Therapy (2006)	Diary of a Mad Dog (2008)	Rise Up (2010)

Professional ratings
Review scores
Source	Rating
PopMatters	5/10
RapReviews	7/10

Diary of a Mad Dog is the debut solo studio album by Cypress Hill rapper Sen Dog. It was released September 30, 2008 via indie label Suburban Noize Records. The record features guest appearances by the likes of Kottonmouth Kings, Demrick, B-Real, Mellow Man Ace, Slip Matola, and J-Killa among others.

== Production ==
According to the rapper, it is his most personal music creation to date. The albums touches various topics including his gang affiliations in his early life, and a mild heart attack, which he suffered during the making of the album.

"I've done the whole dark, morbid thing and the whole rock-n-roll crossover thing. I'm not going to have an agenda on this; I’m going to jam and record whatever is fun to me. With Cypress Hill I'm working with B-Real and DJ Muggs, but with my solo material, it's a bit more of a challenge and more rewarding for me as a songwriter when I come up with tracks and they sound banging."

== Track listing ==
No.	Title	Producer(s)	Length
1.	"Fumble"	Pharmacist Chris	4:14
2.	"Capo"	DJ Ace	3:48
3.	"Biggy Bang"	Rogelio Lozano	4:04
4.	"Hard in the Paint"	Jeffery Simmins Jr.	4:32
5.	"Graceful"	Kumagai	3:26
6.	"Juggernaut"	B-Real	3:26
7.	"Backin' Up My Gang" (featuring J-Killa)	Kumagai	3:28
8.	"Don't Sleep On the Streets" (featuring Johnny Richter)	DJ Ace	3:39
9.	"The Sicko"	DJ Ace	3:33
10.	"International" (featuring Brad X, Slip Matola, The Dirtball & John E. Necro)	Underrated	3:42
11.	"Hell and Back"	Underrated	3:04
12.	"What You Wanna Do"	DJ Ace	3:50
13.	"Hood Rat Love" (featuring Young De)	DJ Khalil	4:16
14.	"Stand Up"	DJ Ace	2:36
15.	"Curtain Call" (featuring AK, Bulletz, J-Killa, Kali, Mellow Man Ace, Viv & Young De)	Anti	5:52
Total length:			57:32

Promotional tracks, not included on the album
No.	Title	Length
16.	"Real West Niggaz" (featuring Snoop Doggy Dogg, The Game & Ice Cube)
17.	"Still Hittin' Da Bong" (featuring B-Real & Kottonmouth Kings)
18.	"From Compton 2 L.A" (featuring MC Ren)

== Personnel ==
- Brad Xavier – executive producer
- Casey Quintal – art direction, design
- Devin DeHaven – photography
- Henry Bagramyan – photography
- John E. Necro – producer, mixing
- Kevin Zinger – executive producer
- Patrick "P-Nice" Shevelin – producer, mastering, mixing
