= Dirty Radio =

Canadian musical group

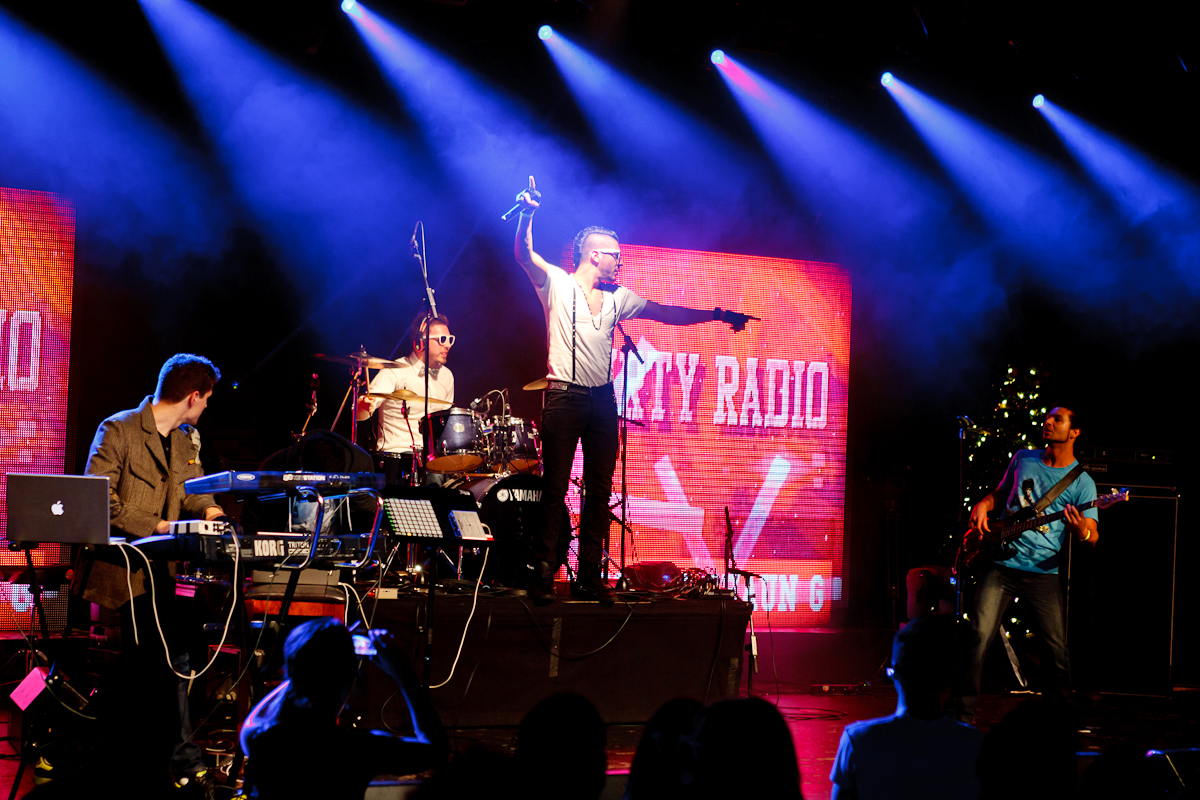
- Dirty Radio live in Vancouver in 2010

Background information
- Origin: Vancouver, British Columbia, Canada
- Genres: Dance; R&B
- Years active: 2010–present
- Labels: Trickery; 604
- Members: Farshad "Shadi" Edalat; Zachary "Waspy" Forbes; Anthony "Tonez" Dolhai
- Website: www.dirtyradio.ca

Dirty Radio (stylized as DiRTY RADiO) is a dance-R&B band from Vancouver, British Columbia, formed in 2010. The band was founded by members Farshad Edalat (lead vocalist, percussion, songwriter) known by his stage name Shadi, Zachary Forbes (DJ, producer, songwriter) known by his stage name Waspy, and Anthony Dolhai (mixer, producer, songwriter) known by his stage name Tonez. The band have released three full-length studio albums (Debut, Cassette, and Pleasures), one EP (Lick 1.0), and a number of singles including "Numbers", "True Love", and "My Life".

In 2015, the band began releasing a series of digital singles which were well-received online and garnered millions of plays on SoundCloud and Spotify.

Dirty Radio is known for crafting a synthesis of progressive pop, R&B and electronic music and have released a number of collaborations on international labels such as Spinnin' Records, Majestic Casual, Fools Gold, Mad Decent, and Partyfine.

They have also toured and shared the stage with acts such as Dragonette, Funk Hunters, Miami Horror, K-os and Lights.

== History ==
Originally formed as a production trio consisting of Shadi, Waspy and Tonez, the group has since evolved their live show, with Shadi and Waspy taking the stage as an electronic duo. DR has collaborated on tracks with several producers and DJs including Young Franco (Australia), Mike Mago (Holland), Jean Tonique (France), Favulous (Italy), Sleepy Tom (Canada), and Just Kiddin (UK). These trakcs have garnered and international airplay from radio stations such as BBC Radio 1Xtra and Triple J.

Dirty Radio released their first full-length album Debut in August, 2010 with the singles "My Heart" (featuring Sherry St. Germain) and "Wanna Ride" both charting on the Billboard Canadian Emerging Artists Chart. In 2011, follow-up single "Ground Shake" was released to radio in Canada, receiving regular rotation on stations nationwide. In March 2012, "Pressure" from Debut was sampled by Rusko and released on his album Songs, receiving acclaim from Pitchfork Media who in their review of the album highlighted the band's "commanding vocal performance."

== Band members ==
- Shadi - vocals, percussion
- Tonez - piano, synthesizers
- Waspy - drums, keyboards, production

== Discography ==
=== Albums ===
| Title | Album details |
|---|---|
| Debut | Released: September 14, 2010; Label: Trickery, 604; Format: Digital download |
| Cassette | Released: October 30, 2012; Label: Trickery, 604; Format: Digital download, cassette |
| Lick 1.0 EP | Released: April 22, 2013; Label: Trickery, 604; Format: Digital download |
| Pleasures | Released: April 12, 2019; Label: 604; Format: Digital download |

=== Singles ===
| Year | Title | Peak | Album |
| Year | Title | CAN | Album |
|---|---|---|---|
| 2010 | "My Heart" (feat. Sherry St. Germain) | 44 | Debut |
| 2011 | "Wanna Ride" | —N/a | Debut |
| 2011 | "Ground Shake" | 45 | |
| 2012 | "Found You" | 37 | |
| 2012 | "In My Head" | 43 | Lick 1.0 |
| 2013 | "F.I.N.E." | —N/a | Lick 1.0 |
| 2015 | "As Long As You're With Me" (Co-producer: Stint) | —N/a | |
| 2015 | "Heart Break Fantasy" | —N/a | |
| 2015 | "Numbers" | —N/a | |
| 2016 | "Curious" | —N/a | |
| 2016 | "True Love" | 34 | |
| 2019 | "My Feelings" | —N/a | Pleasures |

=== Awards and nominations ===
| Year | Nominee / work | Award | Result |
|---|---|---|---|
| 2013 | Pop Artist or Group of the Year | SiriusXM Indie Awards | Nominated |
| 2013 | Dance/Urban/Rhythmic Song of the Year "Found You" | Canadian Radio Music Awards | Nominated |
| 2013 | Urban Recording of the Year - Cassette | Western Canadian Music Awards | Won |
| 2016 | Electronic/Dance Artist of the Year | Western Canadian Music Awards | Nominated |
| 2017 | Electronic/Dance Artist of the Year | Western Canadian Music Awards | Nominated |
