= Mad Dog American =

Studio album by SX-10
- Released: June 6, 2000
- Studio: Track Studios (New York); Stall #2 (Redondo Beach)
- Genre: Rap metal; rap rock
- Length: 38:08
- Label: Cleopatra Records; CLP 0780-2
- Producer: Sen Dog (also exec.); Kevin Zinger (exec.); Lanny Cordola; SX-10

Professional ratings
Review scores
Source	Rating
AllMusic	2.5/5 stars

Mad Dog American is the debut album by American rap rock band SX-10. It was released on June 6, 2000. The twelve-track record featured guest appearances by the likes of Mellow Man Ace, Kottonmouth Kings, Everlast, Rey Oropeza, and DJ Muggs & Eric Bobo from Cypress Hill.

Allmusic reviewer John Young wrote that "The band sounds like a stripped-down, unambitious Rage Against the Machine—and though this couldn't have been the intention, for better or worse, SX-10 is more enjoyable than most of the Cypress Hill you're likely to hear".

The album was reissued in Europe with new artwork and re-titled as Rhymes in the Chamber in 2004, on the Music Avenue label.

== Track listing ==
No.	Title	Length
1.	"Heart Of A Rebel" (featuring DJ Muggs & Rey)	3:14
2.	"Caught Up In The System"	2:36
3.	"Rhyme In The Chamber" (featuring Everlast & Mellow Man Ace)	4:19
4.	"Goin' Crazy" (featuring Eric Bobo)	3:51
5.	"Superstar Trip"	4:13
6.	"Tequila" (featuring Kottonmouth Kings & Mellow Man Ace)	3:11
7.	"Zone" (featuring Rude Dog & Mellow Man Ace)	3:33
8.	"Gotta Get Away"	3:05
9.	"Had Enough"	3:14
10.	"Punk Ass"	3:03
11.	"I'm Not Jesus"	3:17
12.	"Good Ole Rebel"	0:32
Total length:		38:08

== Personnel ==
- Andy Zambrano – guitar
- Brian McNelis – A&R
- Brian Perera – A&R
- Chuck Wright – bass
- Fabrice Henssens – photography
- Frank Mercurio – bass
- Glen Sobel – drums
- Greg Flynn – CD layout
- Jeremy Fleener – guitar
- Kevin Smith – engineering, mixing
- Kevin Zinger – executive producer, management
- Lanny Cordola – producer
- Senen Reyes – vocals, executive producer, producer
- Steven Marcussen – mastering
