= Vengo a Cobrar =

Vengo A Cobrar

Studio album by Mellow Man Ace
- Released: June 8, 2004
- Genre: Hip hop
- Length: 59:18
- Label: Dimelo Records
- Producer: Nissim J. Baly (exec.); Bronek Wroblewski

Mellow Man Ace chronology
From the Darkness into the Light (2000)	Vengo A Cobrar (2004)	Ghetto Therapy (2006)

Vengo A Cobrar is the fourth studio album by American rapper Mellow Man Ace. It was released on June 8, 2004 via Dimelo Records. The seventeen-track record featured guest appearances from Sen Dog, Big Chill, E-Step, Cuban Pete, Lance Robinson, Saint Dog, and Orquesta Tabaco Y Ron.

== Track listing ==
No.	Title	Length
1.	"El Padrino Intro"	3:21
2.	"Latinos Mundial"	3:55
3.	"Morondongo Monologues"	0:29
4.	"Wutuknowabout"	3:56
5.	"Mujeres-Benzes" (featuring Big Chill)	4:06
6.	"Thats My Mama"	3:50
7.	"Vengo A Cobrar" (featuring Sen Dog)	3:42
8.	"Yzu"	3:58
9.	"Money, Music And Crime" (featuring Lance Robinson)	4:33
10.	"Mas Pingon XXX" (featuring Cuban Pete)	3:23
11.	"Luv My Niggaz"	3:52
12.	"Callejera" (featuring Orq. Tabaco Y Ron)	4:11
13.	"Breakin' The Glass" (featuring Saint Dog)	3:39
14.	"Nasti Voy"	3:48
15.	"Half Man Par Tremendo"	3:34
16.	"Perfect Combination" (featuring E-Step)	3:33
17.	"Greg Mack Outro"	1:28
Total length:		59:18

== Personnel ==
- Bronek Wroblewski – producer
- Lance Robinson – composer (track 9)
- Mark Chalecki – mastering
- Nissim J. Baly – artwork, design, executive producer
- Ulpiano Sergio Reyes – main artist
- Vachik Aghaniantz – mixing
