= Rise Up (Cypress Hill song) =

Single by Cypress Hill featuring Tom Morello

from the album Rise Up
- Released: February 23, 2010
- Genre: Rap rock
- Length: 3:50
- Label: EMI, Priority
- Songwriters: L. Freese, S. Reyes, T. Morello, E. Correa, L. Muggerud
- Producers: Tom Morello & B-Real

Cypress Hill singles chronology
"It Ain't Nothin'" (2010)	"Rise Up" (2010)	"Armada Latina" (2010)

Music video
- "Rise Up" on YouTube

"Rise Up" is the second single from Cypress Hill's eighth studio album, Rise Up. It features guitarist Tom Morello. The song is very similar in style to Tom Morello's work with Rage Against the Machine.

== In pop culture ==
- The song appeared in several video games, TV shows and films including The Green Hornet, Silicon Valley, Guitar Hero Live and Zero Dark Thirty.
- The Los Angeles Clippers used the song as their home theme for the 2010-11 NBA season prior the Baron Davis trade.
- "Rise Up" served as the official theme song for the 2010 WWE Elimination Chamber PPV.

== Background ==
Speaking in March 2010 to noted UK urban writer Pete Lewis - Deputy Editor of the award-winning Blues & Soul - Cypress Hill emcee B-Real explained how the song 'Rise Up' became the title track to its accompanying album: "Sen Dog and myself had been working on the album for quite some time. And we got to a point where we were like 'Maybe we should call Tom Morello to see if he'd be interested in taking a listen to this album and perhaps contributing to it'... And so fortunately Tom - who's a friend of ours - listened, liked what he heard - and ended up giving us a great TRACK! And, though at the time we had a few possible album titles prepared that we liked, at that point none of them had actually STUCK. But then, once we recorded Tom's song and came up with the title for it - 'Rise Up' - we knew instantly that had to be the title for the whole RECORD! Because it basically summed up what we were DOING! Like we've been doing this for so long, and here we are now getting back up and trying to get this Cypress Hill movement on the roll again!"

== Music video ==
The music video was filmed in Los Angeles, California. It begins with a news cast describing a riot. When this news cast ends it shows Tom Morello his guitar. This is followed by a scene featuring a girl sitting down with a gas mask on watching several televisions. B-Real's first verse is featured on several televisions before Sen Dog's verse in which the scene ends and it focuses on various shots of Cypress Hill and Tom Morello. At the end it shows the band playing on top of giant lettering stating the song's name in front of various fans.

== Track listing ==
iTunes digital single

No.	Title	Writer(s)	Producer(s)	Length
1.	"Rise Up" (explicit album version)	L. Freese, S. Reyes, T. Morello, E. Correa, L. Muggerud	Tom Morello, B-Real	3:42

CD single

No.	Title	Writer(s)	Producer(s)	Length
1.	"Rise Up" (featuring Tom Morello)	L. Freese, S. Reyes, T. Morello, E. Correa, L. Muggerud	Tom Morello, B-Real	3:42
2.	"Strike the Match"	L. Freese, L. Muggerud, S. Reyes, K. Abdul-Rahman	DJ Muggs, DJ Khalil	3:33

== Charts ==
Chart (2010)	Peak position
US Alternative Songs (Billboard)	20
US Mainstream Rock Songs (Billboard)	20
US Rock Songs (Billboard)	24
