= Paul Stewart (music producer) =

American music producer (b. 1964)

- Born: June 12, 1964 (age 62); Los Angeles, California, U.S.
- Origin: Crenshaw, California, U.S.
- Genres: hip hop; R&B
- Occupations: Record producer; music supervisor; promoter; brand manager
- Years active: 1988-present

For other people with the same name, see Paul Stewart (disambiguation)

Paul Stewart (born June 12, 1964) is an American music industry producer, music supervisor, and brand marketer, recognized for discovering and developing a number of notable musical artists, including Coolio, Warren G, The Pharcyde, and House of Pain.

== Biography ==
Stewart began his career in music during the late 1980s at record label Delicious Vinyl, where he was involved in the promotion and management of musical artists including House of Pain, De La Soul, and Cypress Hill.

In the mid-1990s, Stewart founded street promotions company Powermove Productions (PMP), and built a roster which included both hip-hop artists and corporate music industry clients. During this time Russell Simmons, co-founder of Def Jam, hired Stewart to establish Def Jam's West Coast-based offices. There, Stewart pivoted PMP from street promotions into an urban music management company, and subsequently an Island/Def Jam-affiliated record label through which he signed Montell Jordan. Stewart and PMP later partnered with Loud Records in a joint venture with RCA, where he executive produced Delinquent Habits' first two albums, Delinquent Habits and Here Come the Horns.

In 1999, Stewart was hired as Senior Vice President of Urban A&R at Virgin Records, and a year later ARTISTdirect named him as Director of Urban and Hip-Hop. From 2008 through 2010 he served as Director of Music Marketing at PUMA North America.

In 2010, Stewart formed Atom Factory Music Licensing along with Lady Gaga’s worldwide manager, Troy Carter.

In 2011, Stewart founded Over The Edge Books, an alternative publishing company.

In 2013, Complex included Stewart in their list of the 25 best A&Rs in Hip-Hop History.

Stewart has music supervision credits in over fifty films, including the Academy Award-winning Hustle & Flow, Four Brothers, 2 Fast 2 Furious, and Poetic Justice.
