= Escape from Havana =

Escape From Havana

Studio album by Mellow Man Ace
- Released: August 29, 1989
- Genres: Hip hop; Latin hip hop
- Length: 54:29
- Label: Capitol
- Producers: Dust Brothers; Tony G; Johnny Rivers; DJ Muggs; Def Jef

Mellow Man Ace chronology
Escape From Havana (1989)	The Brother with Two Tongues (1992)

Singles from Escape from Havana
- 1. "Rhyme Fighter" Released: 1989; 2. "Mentirosa" Released: March 9, 1990; 3. "If You Were Mine" Released: 1990

Escape from Havana is the debut album by the American rapper Mellow Man Ace. It was released on August 29, 1989, by Capitol Records. The album was produced by the Dust Brothers, Tony G, Def Jef, DJ Muggs, and Johnny Rivers. Escape from Havana peaked at number 69 on the Billboard 200 and spawned three singles: "Rhyme Fighter", "Mentirosa" and "If You Were Mine".

== Critical reception ==
Professional ratings
Review scores
Source	Rating
AllMusic	4.5/5 stars
The Philadelphia Inquirer	3/4 stars
RapReviews	7.5/10

Escape from Havana garnered positive reviews from music critics who praised the production and lyrics for being a great mix of East Coast and Latin-flavored styles. A writer for People praised the language duality of Ace's lyrical flow, noting his Spanish delivery as being the better language, concluding with, "But it's when he drops into the loving tongue that his music becomes truly distinctive and exciting. Muy bien, Mellow Man." The Philadelphia Inquirer opined that "Mellow Man languishes a tad too long on the ballads—though 'B-Boy in Love' is tolerable—and hits hardest with the Hispanic-pride 'Rap Guanco' and the B-movie homage 'Hip Hop Creature'."

In a retrospective review, Alex Henderson of AllMusic praised the album's amalgam of hardcore tracks and mainstream love ballads that showcase Ace's ability as a bilingual rapper, concluding that "Ace, like a lot of rappers, spends too much time boasting about his microphone skills. Nonetheless, Escape From Havana is an individualistic, risk-taking work that's well worth hearing." Matt Jost of RapReviews said that despite following late '80s hip-hop trends he praised Tony G and the Dust Brothers for their creative use of samples and Ace's lyrical delivery for crafting an album that's less exploitive of Latin culture and more inventive in its given genre, saying that "Pop or hip-hop, Mellow Man Ace was willing (and able) to cater to almost everyone except the gangsta segment. He could pen love songs, he could take a lyrical approach, he could be goofy, he could battle, and he managed to find different forms of expression depending on theme or track."

== Track listing ==
No.	Title	Producer(s)	Length
1.	"Hip Hop Creature"	Dust Brothers	4:01
2.	"Mentirosa"	Tony G	4:20
3.	"Rhyme Fighter"	Tony G	5:12
4.	"If You Were Mine"	Matt Dike & Michael Ross	4:41
5.	"River Cubano"	DJ Muggs	4:26
6.	"Rap Guanco"	Tony G	4:27
7.	"Mas Pingon"	Matt Dike & Michael Ross	5:17
8.	"Gettin' Stupid"	Johnny Rivers	4:53
9.	"Talkapella"	Mellow Man Ace; Tony G	3:56
10.	"B-Boy in Love"	Tony G	4:40
11.	"En la Casa"	Def Jef	4:11
12.	"Enquenteran Amor"	Matt Dike & Michael Ross	5:09

Notes

- "If You Were Mine" features uncredited vocals by Sen Dog.

== Samples ==
- "Hip Hop Creature"
  - "Tom Sawyer" by Rush
  - "Sister Sanctified" by Stanley Turrentine and Milt Jackson
- "Mentirosa"
  - "Evil Ways" and "No One to Depend On" by Santana
- "Rhyme Fighter"
  - "Galaxy" by War
  - "Let a Woman Be a Woman" by Dyke and the Blazers
  - "Get Up, Get into It, Get Involved" by James Brown
  - "Eazy-Duz-It" by Eazy-E
- "If You Were Mine"
  - "Summer Madness" by Kool and the Gang
- "River Cubano"
  - "Funky Drummer" and "Escape-ism" by James Brown
  - "Pump That Bass" by Original Concept
- "Mas Pingon"
  - "Good Old Music" by Funkadelic
- "Gettin' Stupid"
  - "Sing a Simple Song" by Sly and the Family Stone
- "Talkapella"
  - "If You've Got It, You'll Get It" by the Headhunters
  - "Beat Bop" by Rammelzee and K-Rob
  - "Sucker M.C.'s" by Run-DMC
- "B-Boy in Love"
  - "Groove with You" by the Isley Brothers
  - "Sweet Thing" by Rufus featuring Chaka Khan
- "En La Casa"
  - "Rock with You" by Michael Jackson
  - "The Bottle" by Gil-Scott Heron and Brian Jackson
  - "Roadblock" by Stock Aitken Waterman
  - "Maceo" by Maceo and All the King's Men

== Charts ==
Chart (1990)	Peak position
US Billboard 200	69
US Latin Pop Albums (Billboard)	7
US Top R&B/Hip-Hop Albums (Billboard)	47
