= Armada Latina =

Single by Cypress Hill featuring Marc Anthony & Pitbull

from the album Rise Up
- Released: March 2, 2010
- Genre: Hip hop; Latin hip hop
- Length: 4:04
- Label: EMI; Priority
- Songwriters: M. Anthony; S. Stills; L. Freese; S. Reyes; J. Scheffer; A.C. Perez
- Producer: Jim Jonsin

Cypress Hill singles chronology
"Rise Up" (2010)	"Armada Latina" (2010)	"Roll It, Light It" (2012)

Pitbull singles chronology
"Egoísta" (2010)	"Armada Latina" (2010)	"Watagatapitusberry" (2010)

Marc Anthony singles chronology
"Recuérdame" (2009)	"Armada Latina" (2010)	"Y Como Es El" (2010)

Music video
- "Armada Latina" on YouTube

"Armada Latina'" (English: Latino Army) is the fourth single from Cypress Hill's studio album, Rise Up. It features Cuban rapper Pitbull and Puerto Rican singer Marc Anthony. It was released on March 2, 2010. The song samples the fourth portion of the 1969 Crosby, Stills, & Nash song "Suite: Judy Blue Eyes."

== Music video ==
The music video, directed by Matt Alonzo, was filmed at Mariachi Plaza in Los Angeles. The video was premiered on April 8, 2010. Latin pop singer Belinda Peregrín and Kevin McCall are featured in the video. Anthony does not appear in the video, instead, a body double is used for his verses. Stephen Stills, writer of "Suite: Judy Blue Eyes", appears during the guitar breakdown.

== Track listing ==
iTunes digital single

No.	Title	Writer(s)	Producer(s)	Length
1.	"Armada Latina" (feat. Pitbull and Marc Anthony) (explicit album version)	M. Anthony, S. Stills, L. Freese, S. Reyes, J. Scheffer, A.C. Perez	Jim Jonsin	4:04

== Charts ==
Chart (2010)	Peak Position
Czech (IFPI)	55
Canada (Canadian Hot 100)	96
Japan (Japan Hot 100)	63
Romania (Romanian Top 100)	88
US Bubbling Under Hot 100 Singles (Billboard)	6
US Rap Songs (Billboard)	25
