= Here Come the Horns =

Studio album by Delinquent Habits
- Released: July 28, 1998
- Recorded: 1997–1998
- Genre: Hip hop
- Length: 59:13
- Label: Loud, RCA
- Producer: Delinquent Habits (exec.); Paul Stewart (exec.); Sen Dog (exec.)

Delinquent Habits chronology
Delinquent Habits (1996)	Here Come the Horns (1998)	Merry Go Round (2000)

Professional ratings
Review scores
Source	Rating
AllMusic	3.5/5 stars
Calgary Herald	4/5 stars
The Independent	3/4 stars

Here Come the Horns is the second studio album by the American hip hop group Delinquent Habits.

Music videos were made for "This is LA" (video) and "Here Come the Horns" (video).

== Critical reception ==
The Calgary Herald wrote that Delinquent Habits "combine graphic, street-wise raps with hooks galore, with horns a la Herb Alpert and lyrics borrowed from the likes of Grandmaster Flash and Paul McCartney." The Independent deemed the album "spaghetti western soundtrack meets west coast hip hop." The Village Voice concluded that the album "fleshes out their new, politically conscious, mariachi mobster aesthetic ... [the] single of the same name moves away from Dre-influenced funk tracks and toward Latin horns and anti-Prop 187 text."

== Track listing ==
No.	Title	Length
1.	"Intro"	0:27
2.	"This is L.A."	3:11
3.	"It's the Delinquentes" (featuring Sen Dog)	4:16
4.	"1 Adam 12"	3:36
5.	"Think You're Bad"	3:34
6.	"Here Come the Horns"	4:06
7.	"Western Ways"	4:09
8.	"Shed a Tear" (featuring Sen Dog)	4:21
9.	"Wallah"	4:13
10.	"Orphan of the Industry"	5:08
11.	"Life is a Struggle" (featuring Sen Dog)	4:36
12.	"Super DJ (Rock the House Party)"	4:42
13.	"Life I Live"	3:26
14.	"Get Up, Get on It" (featuring Mellow Man Ace, Rude & Sen Dog)	5:25
15.	"Western Ways, Part II (La Selección)" (featuring Big Pun & JuJu)

Samples

- "Think Your Bad" contains a sample from "The Coolest" by King Tee
- "Here Come The Horns" contains a sample from "Bass" by King Tee
- "Western Ways" contains a sample from "Smooth Operator" by Sade
- "Life Is A Struggle" contains a sample from "For Carlos" by Herb Alpert & The Tijuana Brass

== Personnel ==
- Dorian "Doe" Johnson – mixing
- Ivan S. Martin – main artist, executive producer, vocals
- Alex Martinez – main artist, executive producer, producer, mixing
- Senen Reyes – executive producer, featured artist
- Paul Stewart – executive producer
- David L.K. Thomas – main artist, executive producer, vocals
