= Delinquent Habits (album) =

Studio album by Delinquent Habits
- Released: June 4, 1996
- Recorded: 1995–1996
- Studio: Image Recording Studios (Los Angeles, CA); Soundcastle Studios (Los Angeles, CA); PMP Studio (Hollywood, CA)
- Genre: West Coast hip hop; Latin rap
- Length: 51:36
- Label: RCA; Loud
- Producer: Paul Stewart (exec.); Sen Dog (exec.); O.G. Style; Eric Bobo

Delinquent Habits chronology
Delinquent Habits (1996)	Here Come the Horns (1998)

Singles from Delinquent Habits
- 1. "Tres Delinquentes" Released: 1996; 2. "Lower Eastside" Released: 1996

Professional ratings
Review scores
Source	Rating
AllMusic	4/5 stars
Muzik	3/5 stars

Delinquent Habits is the first studio album by the American hip hop group Delinquent Habits. It was released on June 4, 1996, by RCA, on the RCA/Loud subsidiary, PMP Records. The album was produced by Alejandro "O.G. Style" Martinez, except for one track produced by Eric Bobo. It has guest appearances provided by Sen Dog and Hurricane G on the track "Underground Connection". The album peaked at number 74 on the US Billboard 200 and at number 31 on the Top R&B/Hip-Hop Albums chart. Two singles were released, "Tres Delinquentes" and "Lower Eastside".

== Singles ==
"Tres Delinquentes" was released as the album's lead single on April 7, 1996. It contains a sample of "The Lonely Bull", which was originally written by Sol Lake and performed by Herb Alpert in 1962 on his The Lonely Bull. The single reached #35 on the US Billboard Hot 100, becoming the first Delinquent Habits' song in the charts. It also peaked at #61 on the Hot R&B/Hip-Hop Songs, #10 on the Hot Rap Songs, #22 on the Rhythmic Songs and #71 on the Radio Songs charts. Sen Dog of Cypress Hill made a cameo appearance in the music video for "Tres Delinquentes".

The second single from the album, "Lower Eastside", was released on September 9, 1996. It peaked at #36 on the Hot Rap Songs chart, and also has a music video.

== Track listing ==
All music is composed by O.G. Style, except for track 6 composed by Eric Bobo.

No.	Title	Length
1.	"Tres Delinquentes"	4:21
2.	"Lower Eastside"	3:48
3.	"Juvy"	3:44
4.	"What It Be Like"	4:01
5.	"I'm Addicted"	3:38
6.	"The Realm"	3:02
7.	"S.A.L.T. (Shit Ain't Like That)"	3:32
8.	"Good Times"	3:27
9.	"Break 'Em Off"	3:16
10.	"What's Real Iz Real"	3:56
11.	"If You Want Some"	4:07
12.	"Another Fix"	3:48
13.	"Underground Connection" (featuring Hurricane G & Sen Dog)	4:52
14.	"When the Stakes Are High"	3:31
Total length:		51:36

Sample credits

- "Tres Delinquentes"
  - "The Lonely Bull" by Herb Alpert
  - "3 Lil' Putos" by Cypress Hill
- "Lower Eastside"
  - "The Champ" by The Mohawks
  - "Flor De Azalea" by Juan Torres
- "Juvy"
  - "Voices Inside (Everything Is Everything)" by Donny Hathaway
- "What It Be Like"
  - "It's Your Thing" by Cold Grits
- "S.A.L.T. (Shit Ain't Like That)"
  - "Four Play" by Fred Wesley and The Horny Horns
- "I'm Addicted"
  - "Is It Him or Me?" by Jackie Jackson
  - "Hot Pants" by James Brown
- "Good Times"
  - "Lonely Soul" by Freddie Hubbard
  - "Lay Lady Lay" by The Byrds
- "Break 'Em Off"
  - "Sweeping Through the City" by The Stovall Sisters
- "Another Fix"
  - "This Is Soul" by Paul Nero
  - "Best of My Love" by The Emotions

== Personnel ==
- David L.K. Thomas – vocals
- Ivan S. Martin – vocals
- Alejandro R. Martinez – additional vocals, producer (tracks: 1–5, 7–14)
- Senen Reyes – executive producer, additional vocals (track 13)
- Gloria Rodriguez – additional vocals (track 13)
- Eric "Bobo" Correa – producer (track 6)
- Dorian "Doe" Johnson – keyboards (track 4)
- Paul J. Thompson – trumpet (track 13)
- Paul Stewart – executive producer
- Brian Knapp Gardner – mastering
- Gary Meals – A&R direction
- Grant Lau – art direction and design
- Thellus Singleton – cover artwork
- Mike Miller – photography

== Chart history ==
Chart (1996)	Peak position
US Billboard 200	74
US Top R&B/Hip-Hop Albums (Billboard)	31
