= Highlife (song) =

2000 single by Cypress Hill

Single by Cypress Hill

from the album Skull & Bones
- B-side: "Can't Get the Best of Me"^{[A]}
- Released: October 31, 2000
- Genre: Alternative hip hop, hardcore hip hop
- Length: 3:52
- Label: Columbia
- Songwriter(s): Louis Freese, Lawrence Muggerud, Senen Reyes
- Producer(s): DJ Muggs

Cypress Hill singles chronology
"(Rock) Superstar" (2000)	"Highlife" (2000)	"Can't Get the Best of Me" (2000)

"Highlife" is a song by American hip hop group Cypress Hill. The song was released as a single from the group's fifth album, Skull & Bones.

== Track listing ==
No.	Title	Length
1.	"Can't Get the Best of Me" (Radio Edit)	4:07
2.	"Highlife" (UK Radio Edit)	3:52
3.	"Do You Know Who I Am" (LP Version)	3:26
4.	"Can't Get the Best of Me" (Video Version)	4:07
Total length:		15:34

== Personnel ==
- B-Real – vocals
- Sen Dog – vocals
- DJ Muggs – producer

== Charts ==
Chart (2000)	Peak position
UK Singles Chart	35

== Notes ==
- A "Highlife" and "Can't Get the Best of Me" were released together as a double A-side in the United Kingdom.
