= Tres Delinquentes =

1996 single by Delinquent Habits

Single by Delinquent Habits

from the album Delinquent Habits
- B-side: "What It Be Like"
- Released: April 7, 1996
- Studio: PMP Studio (Hollywood)
- Genre: Latin rap
- Length: 4:17
- Label: RCA
- Songwriters: Ivan S. Martin; David L.K. Thomas; Alejandro R. Martinez; Solomon Lachoff
- Producer: O.G. Style

Delinquent Habits singles chronology
"Tres Delinquentes" (1996)	"Lower Eastside" (1996)

Music video
- "Tres Delinquentes" on YouTube

"Tres Delinquentes" is the debut single by American hip hop group Delinquent Habits from their debut studio album, Delinquent Habits (1996). It was written by Ivan "Ives Irie" Martin, David "Kemo The Blaxican" Thomas, Alejandro "O.G. Style" Martinez and Solomon "Sol Lake" Lachoff, with production helmed by O.G. Style. It was recorded at PMP Studio in Hollywood, California, and released through RCA Records on April 7, 1996 as a lead single from the album. It samples the jazz song "The Lonely Bull", performed by Herb Alpert. Reaching a peak position of number 35 on the US Billboard Hot 100, the single remained on the chart for a total of twenty weeks. There are English and Spanish versions of the song.

"Tres Delinquentes" was featured in the South Korean horror-comedy The Quiet Family (1998) and the film Havoc (2005). Los Angeles Dodgers outfielder Andre Ethier has frequently used "Tres Delinquentes" as his walk-up music when he bats at Dodger Stadium. It was also used in the 2025 movie Nobody 2.

Professional ratings
Review scores
Source	Rating
AllMusic	1.5/5 stars

== Track listing ==
Cassette single, CD single
No.	Title	Writer(s)	Producer(s)	Length
1.	"Tres Delinquentes" (Album version)	I. Marlin; D. Thomas; A. Martinez; S. Lachoff	O.G. Style	4:17
2.	"What It Be Like" (Album version)	I. Marlin; D. Thomas; A. Martinez	O.G. Style	4:01

12"
No.	Title	Length
1.	"Tres Delinquentes" (Radio version)	4:18
2.	"Tres Delinquentes" (Instrumental)	4:17
3.	"Tres Delinquentes" (A capella)	2:26
4.	"What It Be Like" (Radio version)	4:01
5.	"What It Be Like" (Instrumental)	4:03
6.	"What It Be Like" (A capella)	2:36

Remixes (Maxi single)
No.	Title	Length
1.	"Tres Delinquentes" (Original version)	4:18
2.	"Tres Delinquentes" (Spanish version)	4:18
3.	"Tres Delinquentes" (Cubano Remix)	5:06
4.	"Tres Delinquentes (Cubano Remix)" (Spanish)	5:05
5.	"Tres Delinquentes" (Tony G. & Julio G. version)	3:44
6.	"Tres Delinquentes (Rock Mix)" (featuring Sen Dog)	3:37

== Personnel ==
- Ivan S. Martin – primary artist, rap vocals
- David L.K. Thomas – primary artist, rap vocals
- Alejandro R. Martinez – primary artist, producer, mixing
- Dorian "Doe" Johnson – engineering, mixing
- Davina Bussey – additional engineering
- Paul Stewart – executive producer
- Senen Reyes – executive producer
- Thellus Singleton – cover art
- Kimberly Felty – management
- DJ Rif – remixing
- Julio Gonzalez – remixing
- Antonio Gonzalez – remixing
- Mickey Petralia – remixing
- Mario G. Caldato Jr. – remixing

== Charts ==
Chart (1996)	Peak position
Finland (Suomen virallinen lista)	16
Germany (GfK)	30
Netherlands (Dutch Top 40)	32
Netherlands (Single Top 100)	40
Sweden (Sverigetopplistan)	32
Switzerland (Schweizer Hitparade)	34
US Billboard Hot 100	35
US Hot R&B/Hip-Hop Songs (Billboard)	61
US Hot Rap Songs (Billboard)	10
US Rhythmic Airplay (Billboard)	22
US Cash Box Top 100	26
