= Delinquent Habits =

American hip hop group

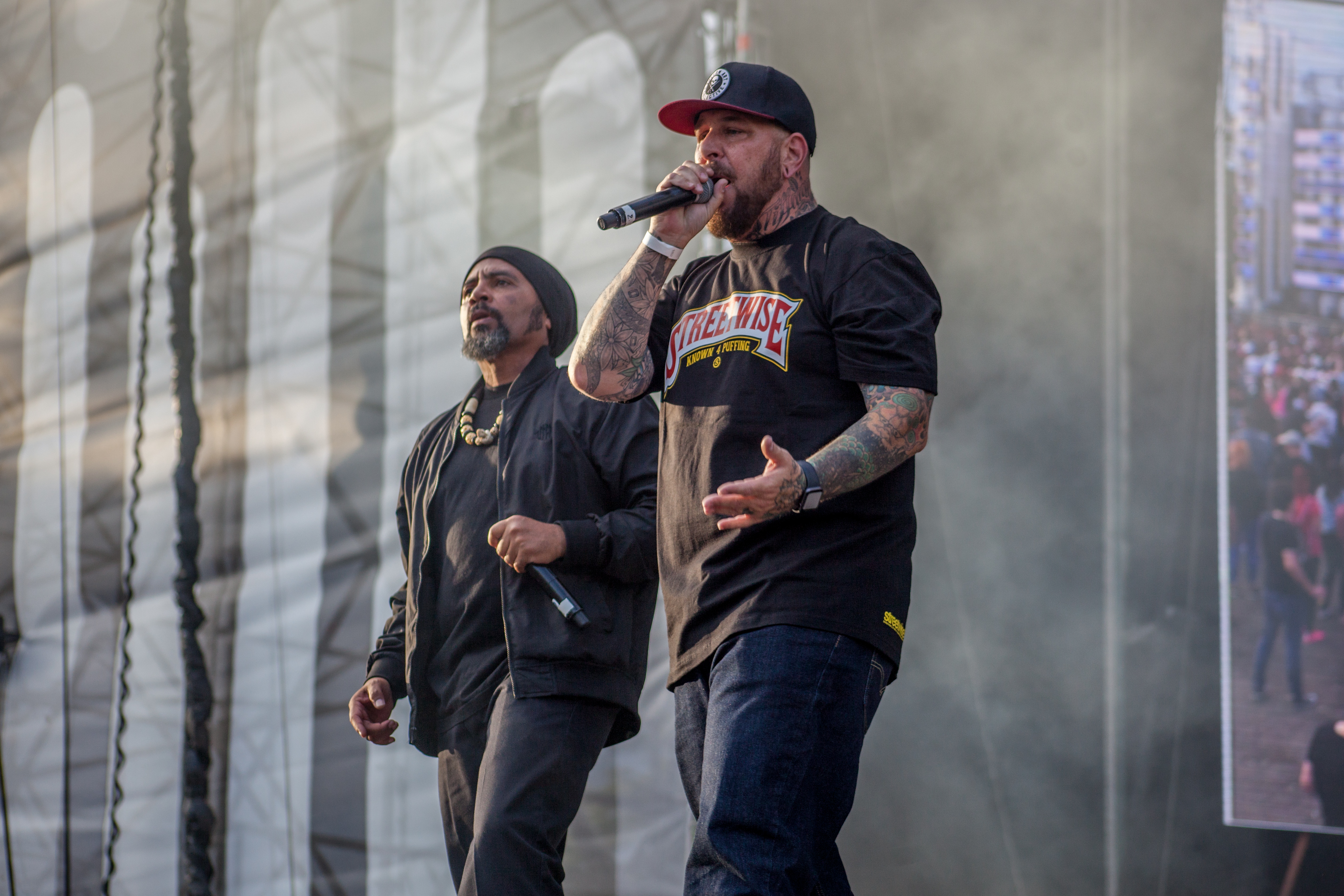
- Delinquent Habits performing in 2019

Background information
- Also known as: Los Delinquentes; Los Tres Delinquentes
- Origin: Norwalk, California, U.S.
- Genres: Hip-hop; Latin hip-hop
- Years active: 1991–present
- Members: Ives Irie; DJ Invincible
- Past members: Kemo The Blaxican; O.G. Style; Michelle Belle
- Website: delinquenthabits.com

Delinquent Habits is an American hip hop group, formed in Norwalk, California in 1991. They are known for their Latin-tinged rap, which is both melodic and hardcore. Their first album was executive produced by Cypress Hill member Sen Dog and featured guest appearances by Sen himself as well as Puerto Rican New York City rapper Hurricane G. Their second album, Here Come the Horns, again featured Sen Dog as well as Sen's brother, pioneering Latin rapper Mellow Man Ace. The melodic Merry-Go-Round featured the female singer Michelle Belle. The group chose to focus more on hardcore rap on their fourth offering, Freedom Band.

== History ==
Delinquent Habits was originally made up of two emcees Kemo The Blaxican (born David L.K. Thomas, April 13, 1969) and Ives Irie (born Ivan S. Martin, August 4, 1971), and a DJ/producer O.G. Style (born Alejandro R. Martinez, July 3, 1970). Thus the group was often called Los Tres Delinquentes (Spanish spelling: los tres delincuentes; Spanish for 'The Three Delinquents'). As a trio, they sold over 1 million copies of their single "Tres Delinquentes", published on the RCA label in 1996. They subsequently received a lot of attention from MTV and the media. Their self-titled debut album and their second releases were executive produced by Paul Stewart and Sen Dog. Almost a million copies of Delinquent Habits were sold. They have been compared to Cypress Hill. Their third album, Merry Go-Round, was published by ARK 21 Records and sold on the underground "Spanglish network".

Kemo soon left the band after the completion of their album Freedom Band to pursue a solo career with some substantial success. He released his debut album in 2004, titled Simple Plan. He was replaced by female vocalist Michelle Belle (born Michelle Miralles), who had been previously featured in some of their songs. She released her debut album in 2016, titled Nothing More, Nothing Less. Around five years after Kemo's exit, O.G. Style also left the band.

== Members ==
Current

- Ives Irie/El Guero/Guero Loco ("Crazy White Boy") (born Ivan S. Martin) - MC
- DJ Invincible - DJ

Former

- Kemo The Blaxican (born David L.K. Thomas) - MC
- O.G. Style (born Alejandro R. Martinez) - MC, DJ, producer
- Thee Michelle Belle (born Michelle Miralles) - vocals, songwriter

== Discography ==
=== Studio albums ===
- Delinquent Habits (1996)
- Here Come the Horns (1998)
- Merry-Go-Round (2000)
- Freedom Band (2003)
- Dos Mundos, Dos Lenguas (2005)
- New and Improved (2006)
- The Common Man (2009)
- It Could Be Round Two (2017)
- El Ritmo (2026)

=== Singles ===
- "Tres Delinquentes" – Delinquent Habits (1996)
- "Lower Eastside" – Delinquent Habits (1996)
- "This Is L.A." – Here Come the Horns (1997)
- "Here Come the Horns" – Here Come the Horns (1998)
- "Western Ways, Part II (La Seleccion)" (feat. Big Pun and JuJu) – Here Come the Horns (1998)
- "Return of the Tres" – Merry-Go-Round (2001)
- "Feel Good" – Merry-Go-Round (2001)
- "California" (feat. Sen Dog) – It Could Be Round Two (2017)

=== Guest appearances ===
- "Cutie Pie" (Lina Santiago feat. Delinquent Habits) - Feels So Good (1996)
- "Get High" (Punto Rojo feat. Delinquent Habits) – Vibracion Exquisita (1998)
- "Mexican Hat Rap" (Hip-Hop Connect presents feat. Delinquent Habits) – Fade to Black (2004)
- "Life Plays" (DJ Payback Garcia feat. Delinquent Habits) – Brown Life, Vol. 2 (2004)
- "Colaborando" (El Chivo feat. Delinquent Habits) – Si Ladran No Muerden (2004)
- "Every Day" (DJ Payback Garcia feat. Delinquent Habits) – Cholos, Cholas y Pistolas (2005)
- "Yo Quiero" (DJ Payback Garcia feat. Delinquent Habits) – Hecho en Aztlan, Vol. 2 (2005)
- "Ninos de la Calle" (DJ Payback Garcia feat. Delinquent Habits) – Hecho en Aztlan, Vol. 2 (2005)
- "Push On" (Dyablo presents feat. Delinquent Habits) – Sangre Azteca, Vol. 1 (2006)
- "Would You Wanna" (DJ Payback Garcia feat. Delinquent Habits) – Aztec Souls, Vol. 2 (2006)
- "Mescalito" (The Superstar DJ's feat. Delinquent Habits) – Born Originals (2007)
- "Gläser in D'Luft" (Brandhärd feat. Delinquent Habits) – Brandrenalin (2007)
- "Wolf" (Mundartisten feat. Delinquent Habits) – M (2010)
- "Via Panam" (El Siete feat. Delinquent Habits) – Panamericana OST (2010)
- "Look Your Best" (1FIFTY1 feat. Delinquent Habits) – Lyrics Anonymous (2010)
- "Puercos" (Sociedad Café feat. Delinquent Habits) -Leales al juego (2012)
- "Bad Love" (Skinny Fresh feat. Delinquent Habits) – Bad Love (2016)
- "CALIFORNIA" (Sendog 'Cypress hill' feat. Delinquent Habits) – California (2017)

== Gallery ==
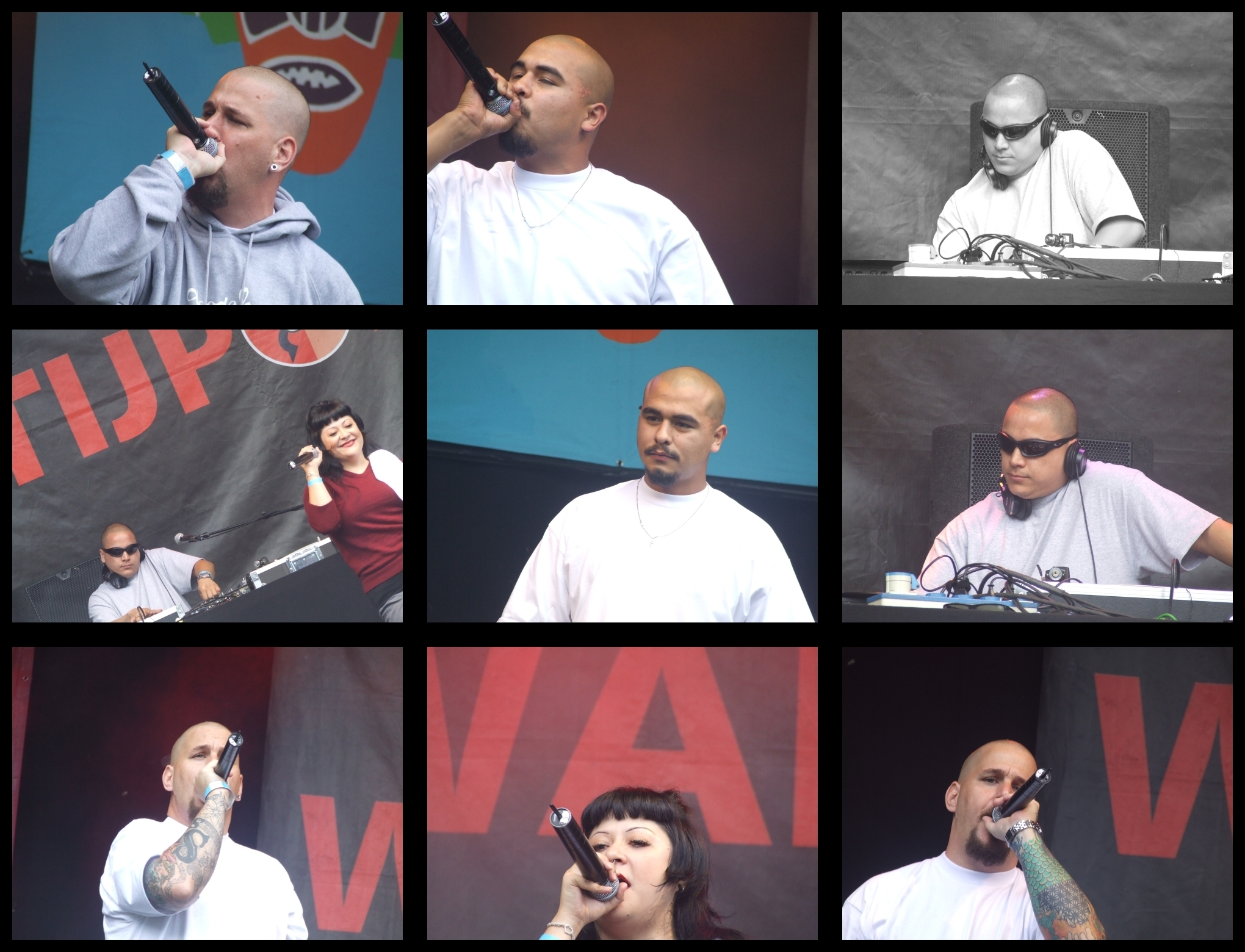
Delinquent Habits on Wantijpop 2007 in Dordrecht (Netherlands)

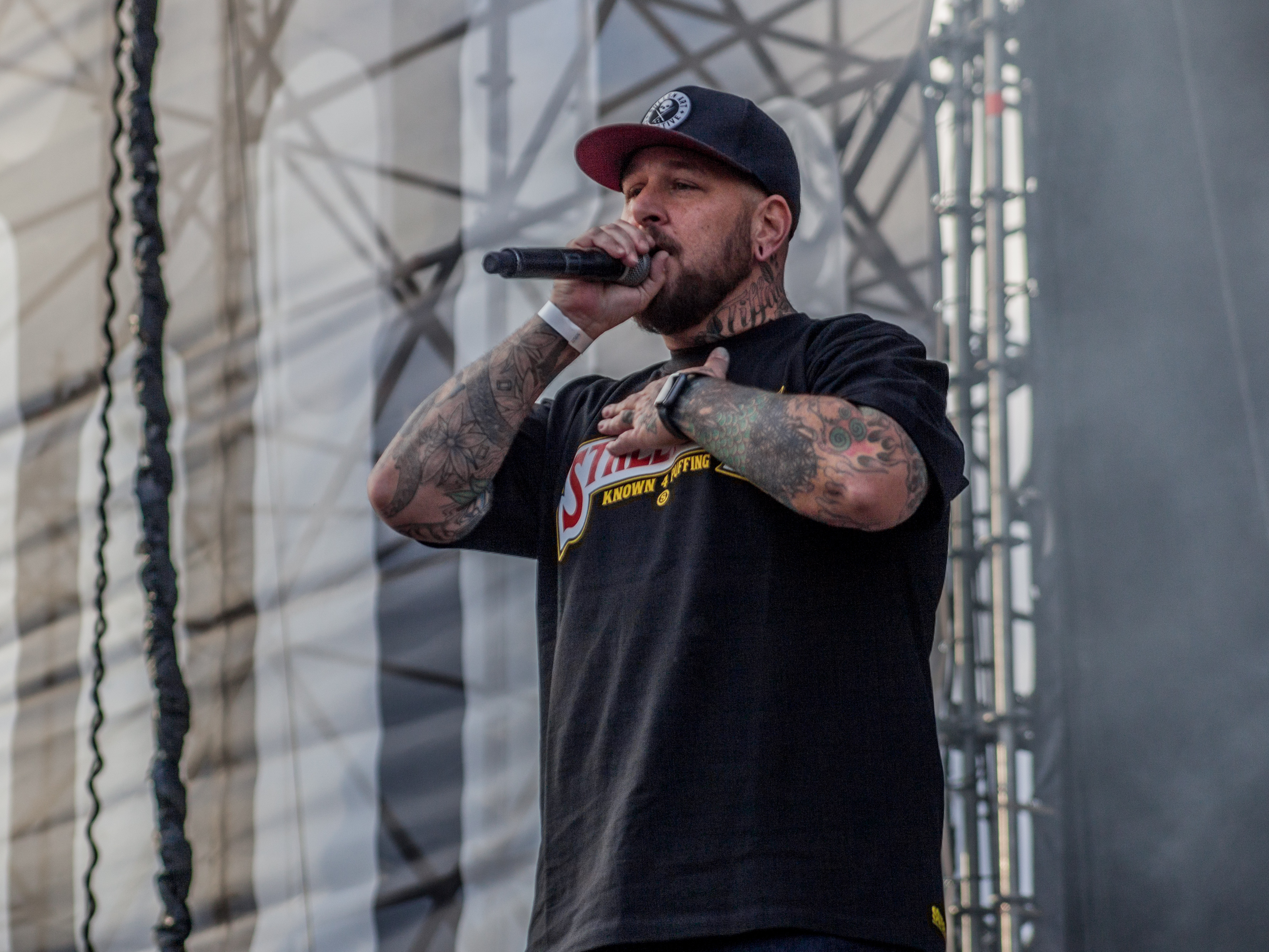
Ives Irie (2019)

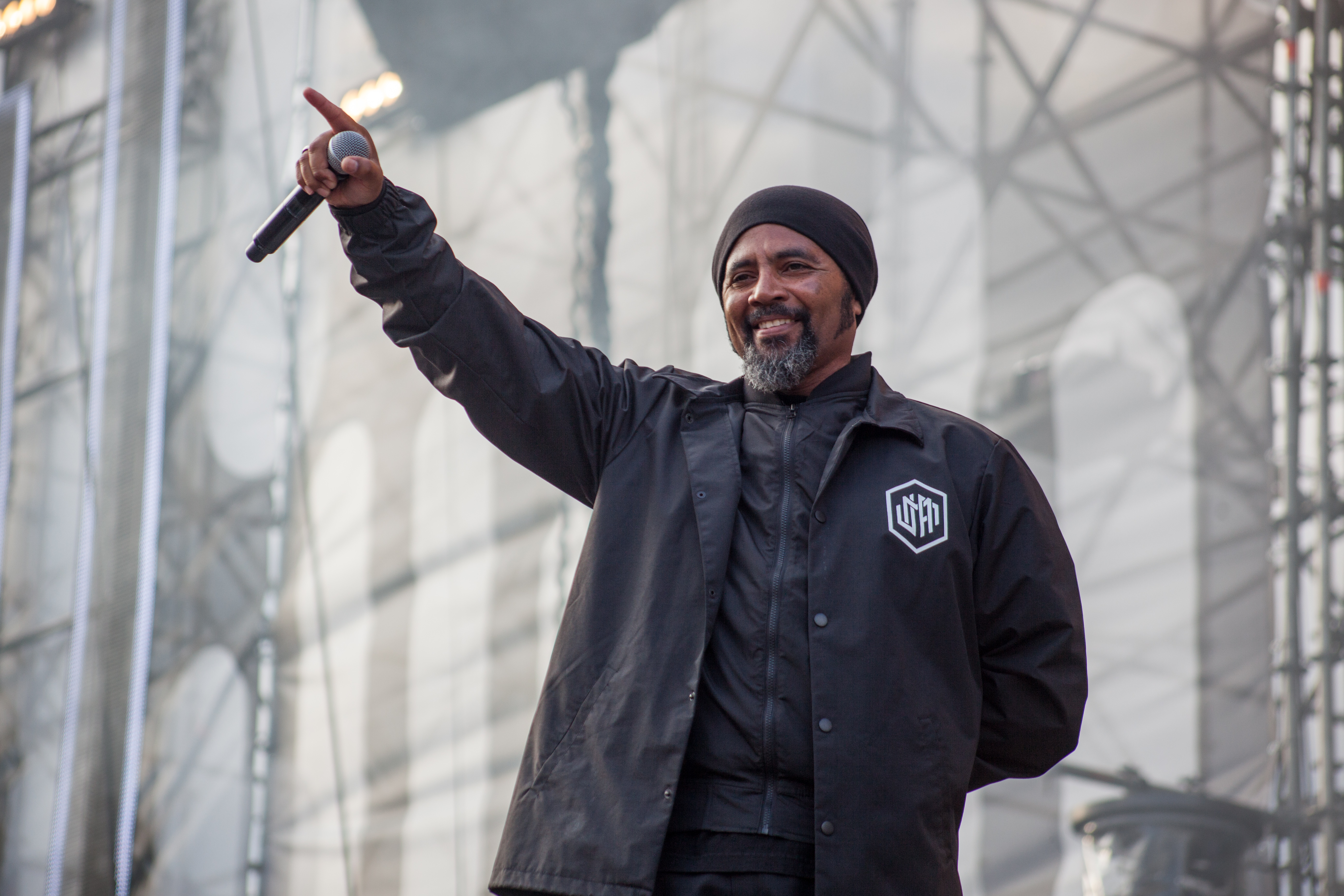
Kemo The Blaxican (2019)
