= Songs (Rusko album) =

Studio album by Rusko
- Released: 26 March 2012
- Genre: Dubstep
- Length: 48:25
- Label: Mad Decent
- Producer: Chris Mercer

Rusko chronology
O.M.G.! (2010)	Songs (2012)	Cypress X Rusko (2012)

Singles from Songs
- 1. "Somebody to Love" Released: 23 January 2012; 2. "Thunder" Released: 16 July 2012

Songs is the second studio album by the British dubstep musician Rusko. It was released on 26 March 2012 through Mad Decent and contains the singles "Somebody to Love" and "Thunder".

== Track listing ==
Songs track listing
No.	Title	Writer(s)	Vocalist	Length
1.	"Intro (Year 3000 Style)"	Christopher Mercer		1:02
2.	"Somebody to Love"	Christopher Mercer, Alexander John William Reid, Nomvula Malinga	Vula	3:01
3.	"Pressure"	Christopher Mercer, Ajay Bhattacharyya, Anthony Dolhai, Farshad Edalat, Zachary Verxa	Dirty Radio	4:04
4.	"Skanker"	Christopher Mercer, Rodney Michael Craig	Rod Azlan	3:41
5.	"Love No More"	Christopher Mercer, Alberto D'Ascola, Clifton Dillon	Alborosie	3:52
6.	"Opium" (featuring LIZ)	Christopher Mercer, Elizabeth Abrams	Betty Trouble	3:40
7.	"Dirty Sexy"	Christopher Mercer, Melissa Arzoomanian	Danni Rouge	2:44
8.	"Be Free"	Christopher Mercer, Michael Dunn, Oje Ollivierre	Million Dan, Protoje	3:13
9.	"Thunder" (featuring Bonnie McKee)	Christopher Mercer, Bonnie McKee, Ted Bruner	Bonnie McKee	3:50
10.	"Roll Da Beats (Old School Edition)"	Christopher Mercer, Evanson Allen	Ratpack	4:08
11.	"Mek More Green"	Christopher Mercer, Michael Mitchell	General Jah Mikey	3:57
12.	"Asda Car Park"	Christopher Mercer, Danielle Wells	Danielle Wells	3:39
13.	"Whistle Crew"	Christopher Mercer, Alexander John William Reid, Nomvula Malinga	Vula	3:25
14.	"M357"	Christopher Mercer, East Clubbers	Kate Lesing	4:09

== Charts ==
Chart performance for Songs
Chart (2012)	Peak position
UK Albums (OCC)	114
UK Dance Albums (OCC)	7
US Billboard 200	155
US Heatseekers Albums (Billboard)	6
US Independent Albums (Billboard)	27
US Top Dance Albums (Billboard)	10
