= Paul Stewart =

Paul Stewart may refer to:

== Arts and entertainment ==
- Paul Stewart (actor) (1908–1986), American actor who appeared in Citizen Kane
- Paul Stewart (writer) (born 1955), English children's novelist
- Paul Stewart (music producer) (born 1964), American music industry producer
- Paul Anthony Stewart (born 1967), American actor
- Paul Stewart (musician), English musician; member of band The Feeling
- Paul Stewart (pianist), Canadian musician
- Paulie Stewart (born 1960 or 1961), Australian musician, journalist

== Sports ==
- Paul Stewart (ice hockey) (born 1953), American ice hockey referee and player
- Paul Stewart (basketball) (born 1956), Scottish basketball player
- Paul Stewart (footballer, born 1964), English footballer (Blackpool, Tottenham Hotspur, Liverpool)
- Paul Stewart (racing driver) (born 1965), Scottish motor racing driver and team director
- Paul Stewart (footballer, born 1979), Scottish footballer (East Fife)
- Paul Stewart (Australian footballer) (born 1987), Australian rules footballer

== Others ==
- Paul Stewart (politician) (1892–1950), U.S. Representative from Oklahoma
- Paul Stewart (historian) (1925–2015), American historian
- Paul A. G. Stewart (born 1941), American clergyman; bishop of the Christian Methodist Episcopal Church
- Paul Stewart (endocrinologist) (born 1959), British medical scientist and endocrinologist

== See also ==
- Paul Stuart, American clothier
