= Cypress X Rusko =

EP by Cypress Hill and Rusko
- Released: June 5, 2012
- Genres: Hip hop; dubstep
- Length: 16:17
- Labels: V2; Cooperative Music
- Producer: Rusko

Cypress Hill chronology
Rise Up (2010)	Cypress X Rusko (2012)	Elephants on Acid (2018)

Rusko chronology
Songs (2012)	Cypress X Rusko (2012)	Kapow (2012)

Singles from Cypress X Rusko
- 1. "Roll It, Light It" Released: February 21, 2012; 2. "Can't Keep Me Down" Released: October 17, 2012

Professional ratings
Review scores
Source	Rating
Consequence	F
The Line of Best Fit	5/10
NME	6/10
RapReviews	6.5/10
Sputnikmusic	2.5/5

Cypress X Rusko is a collaborative extended play by American hip hop group Cypress Hill and British dubstep producer Rusko. The five-track album was released on June 5, 2012 digitally and on August 14, 2012 on vinyl. It debuted at number 50 on the Top R&B/Hip-Hop Albums.

The EP produced two singles, "Roll It, Light It" and "Can't Keep Me Down" which features Damian Marley. On the amalgamation of the two styles of music, Sen Dog of Cypress Hill explains "I think dubstep is a natural progression of hip-hop... Especially the way that we formulated it with Rusko. There's definitely some roughness to it."

== Track listing ==
Cypress X Rusko track listing
No.	Title	Producer(s)	Length
1.	"Lez Go"	Rusko	2:54
2.	"Roll It, Light It"	Rusko	3:06
3.	"Shots Go Off"	Rusko	3:01
4.	"Can't Keep Me Down" (featuring Damian "Jr Gong" Marley)	Rusko	3:22
5.	"Medicated" (featuring Young De)	Rusko	3:53
Total length:			16:17

== Personnel ==
- Chris Mercer – producer, mixing
- Louis Freese – vocals
- Senen Reyes – vocals
- Luca Pretolesi – mastering
- Frank Maddocks – art direction, design, photography
- Damian Marley – vocals (track 4)
- Demerick Shelton – vocals (track 5)
