= Skull & Bones (album) =

Studio album by Cypress Hill
- Released: April 25, 2000
- Recorded: 1999–2000
- Studios: Ameraycan Studios, North Hollywood, Los Angeles, California
- Genres: Hip-hop; rap metal; nu metal
- Length: 64:27
- Label: Columbia
- Producer: DJ Muggs

Cypress Hill chronology
IV (1998)	Skull & Bones (2000)	Live at the Fillmore (2000)

Singles from Skull & Bones
- 1. "(Rap) Superstar" / "(Rock) Superstar" Released: February 29, 2000; 2. "Highlife" / "Can't Get the Best of Me" Released: October 31, 2000

Skull & Bones is the fifth studio album by American hip hop group Cypress Hill, released on April 25, 2000, by Columbia Records. The album's genre and style are divided into two discs — a pure hip hop disc ("Skull") and a rap metal disc ("Bones"). It features guest appearances from Everlast, Eminem, N.O.R.E., Christian Olde Wolbers and Dino Cazares of Fear Factory, Brad Wilk of Rage Against the Machine, and Chino Moreno of Deftones.

== Background ==
Cypress Hill landed a slot supporting the Offspring and MxPx on the Conspiracy of One tour. The song "(Rock) Superstar" was a radio hit on both rap and rock stations. It was performed live by the band with Slash, Duff McKagan and Matt Sorum, members of the hard rock band Guns N' Roses, on Jimmy Kimmel Live. The Intro includes a sample from Ralph Bakshi's film Wizards.

== Reception ==
Professional ratings
Review scores
Source	Rating
AllMusic	3.5/5 stars
The Encyclopedia of Popular Music	3/5 stars
Entertainment Weekly	C+
The Independent	3/5 stars
Now	2/5 Ns
RapReviews	6/10
Rolling Stone	3.5/5 stars
The Rolling Stone Album Guide	1/5 stars

- Rolling Stone - 3.5 stars out of 5 - "A bipolar breakdown…proving hip-hop is more like T2…capable of morphing into anyone they wanna be."
- CMJ - "Proves rather convincingly that Cypress Hill still packs a mighty punch."
- Vibe - "Marks the first major shift in the group's direction....Half of [the album] is a head-banging jam session....Songs like '(Rap) Superstar' prove that the group still has that winning formula."
- The Source - 3.5 mics out of 5 - "May be their most drastic turn yet.… Cypress' flavor runs thick across the disc.… They break down the barriers in order to transcend the industry-imposed terms of alternative and rap…another set for the weeded."
- Rap Pages - "May be the best album you hear for the next 2 years.… [It] is so artistically good that it [will] stay in your personal rotation…"
- Mojo - "Finds them sticking a finger in the air and finding the wind blowing in the direction of thrash-metal."
- NME - 7 out of 10 - "Picks up where the groggy metal/rap melange of '98s Cypress Hill IV left off.… It's business as usual.… They do hip-hop and they do funk-metal rawk…evolving slowly."

== Track listing ==
All tracks produced by DJ Muggs.

Skull (disc 1)
No.	Title	Writer(s)	Length
1.	"Intro"	Lawrence Muggerud	1:52
2.	"Another Victory"	Muggerud; Louis Freese	3:11
3.	"(Rap) Superstar"	Muggerud; Freese	4:53
4.	"Cuban Necktie"	Muggerud; Freese	4:13
5.	"What U Want from Me"	Muggerud; Freese	3:50
6.	"Stank Ass Hoe"	Muggerud; Freese	5:09
7.	"Highlife"	Muggerud; Freese; Senen Reyes	3:53
8.	"Certified Bomb"	Muggerud; Freese; Reyes	4:03
9.	"Can I Get a Hit"	Muggerud; Freese	2:47
10.	"We Live This Shit"	Muggerud; Freese; Reyes	4:20
11.	"Worldwide"	Muggerud; Freese; Reyes	2:45

Bones (disc 2)
No.	Title	Writer(s)	Length
1.	"Valley of Chrome"	Muggerud; Freese; Reyes	4:04
2.	"Get Out of My Head"	Muggerud; Freese; Eric Correa; Christian Olde Wolbers; Dino Cazares	3:31
3.	"Can't Get the Best of Me"	Muggerud; Freese; Reyes; Correa; Brad Wilk	4:15
4.	"A Man"	Muggerud; Freese; Reyes; Correa; Jeremy Fleener; Andy Zambrano	3:08
5.	"Dust"	Muggerud; Freese; Reyes; Correa; Fleener; Zambrano; Wolbers	3:56
6.	"(Rock) Superstar"	Muggerud; Freese; Reyes	4:37

== Notes ==
The untitled instrumental segue after "Stank Ass Hoe" was re-used for the track "Heart of the Assassin" on the 2000 DJ Muggs produced album Soul Assassins II.

== Personnel ==
=== Cypress Hill ===
- B-Real - vocals
- Sen Dog - vocals
- DJ Muggs - turntables, sampler
- Bobo - drums (except "Can't Get the Best of Me"); bass ("Can't Get the Best of Me")

=== Guitarists ===
- Dino Cazares
- Jeremy Fleener
- Rogelio Lozano
- Andy Zambrano
- Alfunction - also keyboards

=== Bassists ===
- Christian Olde Wolbers
- Reggie Stewart - also guitar

=== Other personnel ===
- Michael Barbiero - engineering
- Brad Wilk - drums

== Charts ==
=== Weekly charts ===
Weekly chart performance for Skull & Bones
Chart (2000)	Peak position
Australian Albums (ARIA)	6
Austrian Albums (Ö3 Austria)	5
Belgian Albums (Ultratop Flanders)	17
Belgian Albums (Ultratop Wallonia)	37
Canadian Albums (Billboard)	3
Canadian R&B Albums (Nielsen SoundScan)	2
Dutch Albums (Album Top 100)	10
Finnish Albums (Suomen virallinen lista)	1
French Albums (SNEP)	13
German Albums (Offizielle Top 100)	4
Hungarian Albums (MAHASZ)	9
New Zealand Albums (RMNZ)	13
Norwegian Albums (VG-lista)	24
Swedish Albums (Sverigetopplistan)	29
Swiss Albums (Schweizer Hitparade)	7
UK Albums (Official Charts)	6
US Billboard 200	5
US Top R&B/Hip-Hop Albums (Billboard)	4

=== Year-end charts ===
2000 year-end chart performance for Skull & Bones
Chart (2000)	Position
Belgian Albums (Ultratop Flanders)	84
Canadian Albums (Nielsen SoundScan)	98
European Albums (Music & Media)	94
Finnish Foreign Albums (Suomen virallinen lista)	165
German Albums (Offizielle Top 100)	96
US Billboard 200	84
US Top R&B/Hip-Hop Albums (Billboard)	91

2002 year-end chart performance for Skull & Bones
Chart (2002)	Position
Canadian R&B Albums (Nielsen SoundScan)	197
Canadian Rap Albums (Nielsen SoundScan)	97

== Certifications ==
Certifications for Skull & Bones
Region	Certification	Certified units/sales
Canada (Music Canada)	Platinum	100,000^{^}
Finland	—	12,445
United Kingdom (BPI)	Gold	100,000^{^}
United States (RIAA)	Platinum	1,000,000^{^}
^{^} Shipments figures based on certification alone.
