= From the Darkness into the Light =

From The Darkness Into The Light

Studio album by Mellow Man Ace
- Released: July 18, 2000
- Genre: Hip hop
- Length: 40:06
- Label: X-Ray
- Producer: Collective Funkateerz; Cuban; DJ Muggs; Mellow Man Ace

Mellow Man Ace chronology
The Brother with Two Tongues (1992)	From The Darkness Into The Light (2000)	Vengo a Cobrar (2004)

From The Darkness Into The Light is the third studio album by American rapper Mellow Man Ace. It was released on July 18, 2000, via X-Ray Records. The twelve-track record featured guest appearances by Cypress Hill and Profound.

Professional ratings
Review scores
Source	Rating
AllMusic	4.5/5 stars

== Overview ==
Mellow Man Ace scored a major crossover hit with 1989's "Mentirosa" but, by 1993, the Havana-born rapper was without a record deal. Released in 2000, From the Darkness Into the Light was his first album since 1992's The Brother With Two Tongues. Eight years is a long time for an MC to go without a new album—especially when you consider how much hip-hop trends can change from one year to the next. But Ace, who was 33 when this CD came out, has no problem changing with the times and delivering an excellent album that is mindful of 2000's rap tastes. A revitalized Ace divides the disc into a Dark Side and a Light Side, which might lead one to assume that he is dividing his time between hardcore rap and pop-rap like he did in the past. But that isn't the case.

Enlisting such producers as DJ Muggs (of Cypress Hill and 7A3 fame) and Tony G., Ace avoids pop-rap—this release doesn't offer anything as commercial as "Mentirosa"—and sticks to hardcore rap. Truth be told, the Dark Side and Light Side are equally hard-hitting. The album has a consistently serious tone; Ace tackles a lot of social issues (everything from urban violence to child pornography), and he speaks candidly and openly about the fact that he went from fame to obscurity. Regrettably, From the Darkness Into the Light wasn't the major commercial comeback he was no doubt hoping for—the album received very little attention. But that doesn't make it any less compelling.

== Track listing ==
No.	Title	Producer(s)	Length
1.	"Cleopatra's Dungeon Intro"	Collective Funkateerz	1:47
2.	"Is It You"	Collective Funkateerz	4:41
3.	"Guillotine Tactics" (featuring B-Real and Profound)	Collective Funkateerz	3:52
4.	"Miracles"	Collective Funkateerz	4:26
5.	"Promotor Super Estrella"	DJ Muggs	2:43
6.	"Future Shock"	Collective Funkateerz	3:33
7.	"Heaven"	Collective Funkateerz	4:58
8.	"Ten La Fe"	DJ Muggs	4:02
9.	"Bring It Back"	Cuban; Mellow Man Ace	4:28
10.	"Feel Tha Steel" (featuring Sen Dog)	Cuban; Mellow Man Ace	3:52
11.	"Sly Slick and Wicked" (featuring Sen Dog)		3:49
12.	"Cleopatra's Dungeon Outro"	Collective Funkateerz	1:40
Total length:			40:06

== Personnel ==
- Bruce Gowdy - recording, engineering, mixing
- Chuck Wright - artwork
- Kevin Smith - engineering
- Marco Torres - photography
- Mike Mireau - mastering
- Lawrence Muggered - production, recording, mixing
- Ulpiano Sergio Reyes - main artist, production
