= Freedom Band =

Studio album by Delinquent Habits
- Released: March 4, 2003
- Genres: Latin hip hop; hardcore hip hop; chicano rap
- Length: 58:08
- Label: ARK 21 Records
- Producer: Delinquent Habits

Delinquent Habits chronology
Merry Go Round (2000)	Freedom Band (2003)	Dos Mundos Dos Lenguas (2005)

Professional ratings
Review scores
Source	Rating
AllMusic	4/5 stars

Freedom Band is the fourth studio album by American Latin hip hop group Delinquent Habits, released in 2003. The single, "U Don't Own Me", samples Lesley Gore's notable song.

== Critical reception ==
The Plain Dealer wrote that Delinquent Habits "brings the noise on its fourth album, with 14 charged originals produced solely by the group." AllMusic called Freedom Band "a party album," writing that "the group mixes a contemporary sound with traces of Latin horns and guitars."

== Track listing ==
No.	Title	Length
1.	"Straight Up"	4:51
2.	"Freedom Band"	4:08
3.	"Info."	4:20
4.	"U Don't Own Me"	4:15
5.	"This Right Here"	5:06
6.	"Nighttime Play"	4:01
7.	"Downtown"	4:19
8.	"Everyday"	3:44
9.	"24"	4:26
10.	"O.G. Scratch"	1:48
11.	"I Can't Forget It"	3:47
12.	"Hey Tell 'Em"	3:58
13.	"Take It All Away"	4:11
14.	"The Last Song"	5:14
Total length:		58:08
