= Genghis Danger =

EP by Rusko
- Released: 18 November 2019
- Genres: Dubstep; neurofunk
- Length: 12:41
- Label: Deadbeats
- Producer: Christopher William Mercer

Rusko chronology
Megarad (2019)	Genghis Danger (2019)

Genghis Danger is an extended play by British dubstep and drum and bass producer Rusko. It was released by Canadian record label Deadbeats on 18 November 2019. It contains four songs, including dubstep tracks "Go Up", "One Family", and "Bumbaclat" as well as the neurofunk song "Oh My God".

== Background and release ==
The title of the extended play came from Rusko asking his 3-year-old son what he should call it, with him responding "Genghis Danger". Rusko's son was also featured on the cover art.

On 18 November 2019, the extended play was released as a digital download on international digital stores through Canadian record label Deadbeats, as well as being released through various music streaming services.

== Critical reception ==
Genghis Danger was well received by most critics. Writing for Your EDM, Matthew Meadow wrote that Rusko "stayed true to his original vibes and has just gotten better in the process" and highlighted the song "Go Up" as his favourite song from the extended play. The extended play was described as a "quick crash-course history lesson in bass" by Harry Levin of Dancing Astronaut and as a blend of "the best of bass music into this impressive four-track sonic journey" by This Song Is Sick's Langston Thomas.

== Track listing ==
Digital download
No.	Title	Length
1.	"Go Up"	3:10
2.	"One Family"	3:59
3.	"Oh My God"	2:26
4.	"Bumbaclat"	3:06
Total length:		12:41

== Release history ==
Region	Date	Format	Label	Ref.
Worldwide	18 November 2019	Digital download	Deadbeats	
