= SX-10 =

American rap rock band

- Genres: Rap metal; rap rock
- Years active: 1996–present
- Members: Sen Dog; Jimmie Rodriguez; Andy Zambrano; Jeremy Fleener; Sean McCormick

SX-10 is an American rap rock band formed in 1996 by West Coast rapper Sen Dog.

== History ==
SX-10 was formed in 1996 in Los Angeles, California by Cypress Hill member Sen Dog. According to Sen Dog, SX-10 was formed because he had wanted to perform a different style of music. SX-10 released its debut album, Mad Dog American, on June 6, 2000. It featured guest appearances by DJ Muggs, Everlast, Mellow Man Ace, Eric Bobo and Kottonmouth Kings. Members Andy Zambrano and Jeremy Fleener also performed on Cypress Hill's 2001 album Stoned Raiders. In 2006, Sen Dog stated that SX-10 would be working on a second album.

== Band members ==
- Sen Dog — vocals
- Jimmie Rodriguez — bass
- Andy Zambrano — guitar
- Jeremy Fleener — guitar
- Sean McCormick — drums

== Discography ==
- Mad Dog American (2000)
- Temple Of Tolerance (Unreleased) (2006)
- EP (2008)
