= Panamericana (film) =

Swiss documentary

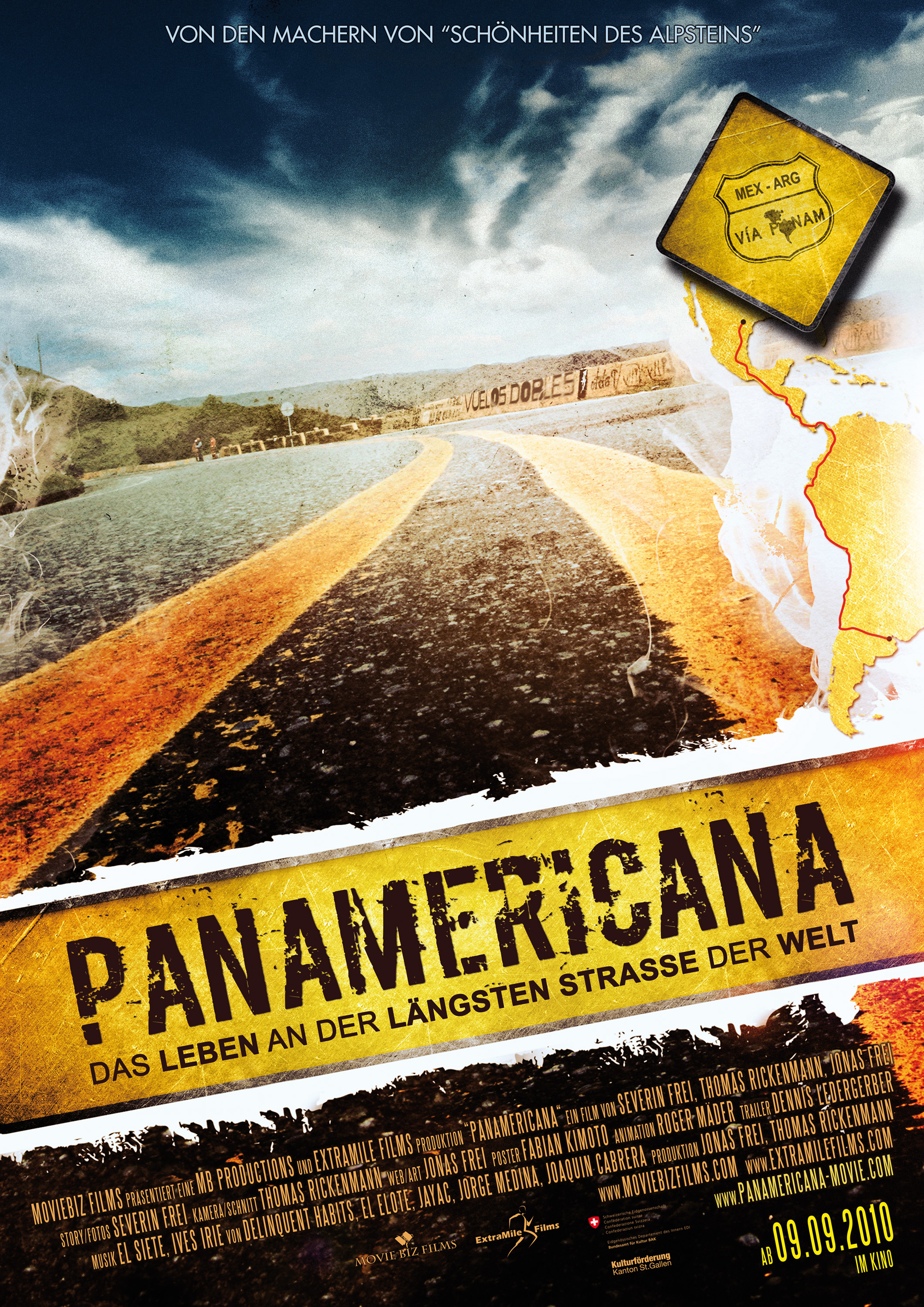
- Movie Poster
- Directed by: Severin Frei; Jonas Frei; Thomas Rickenmann
- Produced by: MB Productions; ExtraMile Films
- Cinematography: Thomas Rickenmann; Jonas Frei
- Edited by: Thomas Rickenmann; Severin Frei
- Music by: Siete Records
- Distributed by: MovieBiz Films
- Release date: September 9, 2010
- Running time: 98 minutes
- Country: Switzerland
- Language: Spanish
- Budget: $200,000

Panamericana is a 2010 documentary about a road trip from Laredo to Argentina. The road trip went through 12 countries and travelled 13,000 kilometres. Filming began in late May 2009 and continued for three months. A total of 90 hours of film were cut down into a 98 minute documentary. Panamericana premiered in 20 Swiss cinemas on 8 September 2010. In total, it was seen by about 10,000 people.

== Plot ==
The film tells stories of lives on and around the Pan-American Highway. The journey begins in Laredo (United States) and continues through Central America and South America to Buenos Aires (Argentina).

== Soundtrack ==
Panamericana (Original Motion Picture Soundtrack)

Film score by El Siete
- Released: September 9, 2010
- Genre: Soundtrack
- Length: 53:01
- Label: Siete Records
- Producer: El Siete

Panamericana's soundtrack score was created by El Siete.

The track listing for the original CD is as follows:

1. "Via Panam" (Title Track) (04:14) – performed by El Siete feat. Delinquent Habits
2. "Amor" (03:22) – performed by Manu Vazquez
3. "Llama a la Chota" (03:44) – performed by El Elote
4. "Valparaíso" (Live) (03:24) – performed by Jorge Medina
5. "Desilusión" (04:45) – performed by Jayac
6. "Nuestro Juramento" (03:19) – performed by Joaquin Cabrera
7. "Difunta Correa" (Live) (02:54) – performed by Francesca
8. "Camino a Guanajuato" (03:06) – performed by Joaquin Cabrera
9. "No te Olvides" (04:29) – performed by Jayac
10. "Beat Andino" (02:31) – performed by Andino
11. "Adoro" (Live) (02:52) – performed by Jorge Medina
12. "Creo" (03:14) – performed by Joaquin Cabrera
13. "Bienvenido" (04:43) – performed by Corina feat. El Siete
14. "Historia" (Live) (02:58) – performed by Jorge Medina
15. "Que bonita es esta vida" (02:47) – performed by Joaquin Cabrera
16. "Destino cruel" (06:18) – performed by Jayac
17. "Animitas" (03:31) – performed by Francesca feat. El Siete
18. "Te fuiste" (03:48) – performed by Jayac
19. "Guapa y linda" (02:51) – performed by Manu Vazquez
20. "Guantanamera" (04:34) – performed by Puerto Cuba
21. "Marimba" (Live) (02:57) – performed by Banda en vivo
