= (Rap) Superstar =

2000 song performed by Cypress Hill

Single by Cypress Hill

from the album Skull & Bones
- B-side: "(Rock) Superstar"^{[A]}
- Released: February 29, 2000
- Genre: Hip hop
- Length: 4:53 (album version); 4:17 (edit)
- Label: Columbia
- Songwriters: Louis Freese, Lawrence Muggerud
- Producer: DJ Muggs

Cypress Hill singles chronology
"Siempre Peligroso" (1999)	"(Rap) Superstar" (2000)	"(Rock) Superstar" (2000)

Music video
- "(Rap) Superstar" on YouTube

"(Rap) Superstar" is a single by American hip hop group Cypress Hill. The song was released as the lead single from the group's fifth album, Skull & Bones. It was originally released as a double A-side with its rock counterpart on February 29, 2000 in the UK. An individual release was available starting sometime in April.

== Music video ==
The music video for the song begins with a young man walking down the street, kicking a can. Walking up to a puddle, the man finds a ticket with "Rap Superstar" written on it. A fun house suddenly pops up and the man hands the ticket to Sen Dog, then enters. In one of the rooms, the man sees a group of women who dress him up in a suit. In another room, the man listens to a speech being given by B-Real, dressed as Fidel Castro. In another room, TV screens show rappers Eminem and Noreaga giving testimonies about the rap business. At the video's climax, the man goes to a performance by the band before being chased by the crowd. As the man exits the fun house, an explosion occurs and the man smiles.

== Charts ==
Chart (2000)	Peak position
US R&B	87
US Rap	43
CHE	21
GER	22
IRL	39
NZ	34
UK	13

== Notes ==
- A "(Rap) Superstar" and "(Rock) Superstar" were released together as a double A-side single in the United Kingdom.
