= Ghetto Therapy =

Studio album by Reyes Brothers
- Released: June 13, 2006
- Genre: Hip hop
- Length: 1:01:34
- Label: Latin Thug
- Producer: Fred Sherman (exec.); Marvin "Big Marv" Sheleby (also exec.); Roberto Jimenez; Fredwreck; B-Real; DJ Muggs; Scoop DeVille; Warren G; XL; DJ Ace

Mellow Man Ace chronology
Vengo A Cobrar (2004)	Ghetto Therapy (2006)	La Familia Vol. 1 (2008)

Sen Dog chronology
Till Death Do Us Part (2004)	Ghetto Therapy (2006)	Diary Of A Mad Dog (2008)

Ghetto Therapy is the first collaborative album by American rappers Sen Dog and Mellow Man Ace as the Reyes Brothers, released on June 13, 2006 via Latin Thugs Entertainment LLC.

== Background ==
The seventeen-track record features guest appearances by the likes of Cypress Hill, Warren G, Snoop Dogg, Bishop Lamont, Bishop Don Juan Magic, Slip Malota, Pop Duke, O. Brown, J Killa, Frank Lee White.

== Track listing ==
No.	Title	Writer(s)	Producer(s)	Length
1.	"If I Die"	Senen Reyes; Ulpiano Reyes; Farid Nassar	Fredwreck	4:22
2.	"H.A.R.D."	Reyes; Reyes; Richard Ascencio	DJ Ace	3:44
3.	"I Lied"	Reyes; Reyes; Nassar	Fredwreck	3:48
4.	"Traffic" (featuring Slip Matola)	Reyes; Reyes	Big Marv; Slip Matola	3:28
5.	"Interlude"	Reyes	Big Marv; Roy Twizzle	0:47
6.	"We O.G.'s" (featuring Frank Lee White, Snoop Dogg & Warren G)	Reyes; Reyes; Lael Williams; Warren Griffin	Warren G	3:38
7.	"Fight Night" (featuring Bishop Lamont)	Reyes; Reyes; Phillip Lamont; Louis Freese	B-Real	4:11
8.	"It's Yours" (featuring O. Brown)	Reyes; Reyes; Larry Muggerud; Oscar Brown	DJ Muggs	4:42
9.	"Sip A Dat"	Reyes; Reyes; Dave Aron	Dave "Dizzle" Aron	3:04
10.	"Birdie Birdie" (featuring Slip Matola)	Reyes; Reyes; Ascencio	DJ Ace	3:15
11.	"Kushed Out"	Reyes; Reyes	Big Marv; Roy Twizzle	2:08
12.	"It's Official" (featuring The Bishop Don Magic Juan)	Reyes; Reyes	XL	4:10
13.	"Is What It Is"	Reyes; Reyes; Curtis Ewing	XL	3:46
14.	"Bulletproof Game" (featuring B-Real & J-Killa)	Reyes; Reyes; Freese	B-Real	4:41
15.	"It's Goin' Down"	Reyes; Reyes; Nassar	Fredwreck	4:00
16.	"Wild Wild West" (featuring Pop Duke)	Reyes; Reyes	Roy Twizzle	3:47
17.	"You Don't Know Me"	Reyes; Reyes; Elijah Molina	Scoop DeVille	4:03
Total length:				1:01:34

== Technical personnel ==
- Brian "Big Bass" Gardner – mastering
- Brian Warfield – recording
- Bronek Wroblewski – drum programming
- Dave Aron – mixing, recording
- Estevan Oriol – design, layout, photography
- Fred Sherman – executive producer
- Gregg "The Wave Doctor" Sartiano – mixing
- Louis Freese – recording
- Lucky (of Soul Assassins Studio) – design, layout
- Mark Machado – design, layout
- Marvin "Big Marv" Sheleby – executive producer
- Roberto Jimenez – producer
