= The Brother with Two Tongues =

The Brother With Two Tongues

Studio album by Mellow Man Ace
- Released: 1992
- Recorded: 1991–1992
- Genre: Hip hop
- Length: 59:53
- Label: Capitol
- Producer: Julio G; Bronek Wroblewski; Ralph Merdano; DJ Muggs; Tony G; the Baker Boyz

Mellow Man Ace chronology
Escape from Havana (1989)	The Brother With Two Tongues (1992)	From The Darkness Into The Light (2000)

The Brother With Two Tongues is a studio album by the American rapper Mellow Man Ace. It was released in 1992 via Capitol Records.

The thirteen-track record featured guest appearances from Sen Dog, Krazy Dee, and Tomahawk Funk. Audio production was handled by Julio G, DJ Muggs, Tony G., and others.

== Critical reception ==
Professional ratings
Review scores
Source	Rating
AllMusic	4/5 stars
Chicago Tribune	3/4 stars

Rolling Stone wrote: "Obviously heeding Cypress Hill's strategy by downplaying the Hispanic angle and adopting a more generic sound, this more marketable but artistically inferior second album offers a bland, eclectic blend."

== Track listing ==
No.	Title	Writer(s)	Producer(s)	Length
1.	"What's It Take to Pull a Hottie (Like You?)"	Ulpiano Sergio Reyes; Bronek Wroblewski	B. Wroblewski	4:22
2.	"Brother with Two Tongues"	Reyes	Julio G	4:59
3.	"Linda"	Reyes	Julio G	4:27
4.	"Babalu Bad Boy"	Reyes; Lawrence Muggerud	DJ Muggs	3:44
5.	"Gettin' Funky in the Joint"	Reyes; Julio Gonzalez	Julio G	4:12
6.	"Hypest from Cypress" (featuring Krazy Dee, Sen Dog, Tomahawk Funk)	Reyes; Gonzalez; Griffiths; Senen Reyes; Tyrone Pachero	Julio G	6:03
7.	"Funky Muneca"	Reyes; Wroblewski	B. Wroblewski	4:58
8.	"Boulevard Nights"	Reyes; Gonzalez; Eric Vidal; Nick Vidal	Julio G; The Baker Boyz	4:41
9.	"Me la Pelas"	Reyes	Julio G	3:48
10.	"Ricky Richardo of Rap"	Reyes; Ralph Medrano	R. Medrano	4:40
11.	"Welcome to My Groove"	Reyes; Tony Gonzales	Steve "Silk" Hurley; Tony G.	5:58
12.	"Mellow Says Hello"	Reyes; Gonzalez	Julio G	4:18
13.	"Untitled (Time to Get Busy, Busy)"	Reyes		4:03
Total length:				59:53

== Personnel ==
- Brian Gardner - mastering
- Bronek Wroblewski - producer
- Christine Beaudet - coordinator (production)
- Command A Studios, Inc. - design
- Eric Vidal - producer, arranger
- Joy Bailey - A&R
- Julio Gonzalez - producer, arranger
- Lawrence Muggerud - producer
- Michael Miller - photography
- Morey Alexander - management, executive producer
- Nick Vidal - producer, arranger
- Ralph Merdano - producer
- Sarajo Frieden - design (lettering)
- Senen Reyes - guest performer
- Steve "Silk" Hurley - producer
- Todd Alexander - coordinator (production)
- Tommy Steele - art direction
- Tony Gonzales - producer, arranger
- Tyrone Pachero - guest performer
- Ulpiano Sergio Reyes - main artist, executive producer
