= Merry Go Round (Delinquent Habits album) =

Studio album by Delinquent Habits
- Released: June 20, 2000
- Genre: Latin hip hop; hardcore hip hop; chicano rap
- Length: 58:38
- Label: Station Thirteen Records; Meanstreet Records; ARK 21 Records
- Producer: Alejandro R. "O.G. Style" Martinez

Delinquent Habits chronology
Here Come the Horns (1998)	Merry Go Round (2000)	Freedom Band (2003)

Merry Go Round is the third studio album by the latin hip hop group Delinquent Habits. The song "House of the Rising Drum" was featured on the soundtrack of the video game Tony Hawk's Pro Skater 4 while the songs "Station Thirteen", "Return of the Tres", "Merry-Go-Round", "Sick Syde Drop", "Beijing", "House of the Rising Drum" and "Anytime Alltime" were featured on the soundtrack of the video game Total Overdose.

Professional ratings
Review scores
Source	Rating
AllMusic	4/5 stars

== Track listing ==
No.	Title	Length
1.	"Station Thirteen"	3:51
2.	"Feel Good"	3:55
3.	"Return of the Tres"	4:14
4.	"Boulevard Star" (featuring Michelle "Belle" Miralles)	3:27
5.	"Midnite Spin" (featuring Sick Jacken)	3:53
6.	"The Kind"	3:25
7.	"Merry-Go-Round"	4:38
8.	"Que Vuelva" (featuring Michelle "Belle" Miralles)	4:18
9.	"Sick Syde Drop"	3:41
10.	"Beijing"	4:13
11.	"No Sense"	3:33
12.	"Southern Accent"	3:51
13.	"House of the Rising Drum"	3:22
14.	"Anytime Alltime"	4:11
15.	"Temptation" (featuring Michelle "Belle" Miralles)	4:06
Total length:		58:38

== Personnel ==
- Jack Gonzalez - featured artist, guest vocals (track 5)
- Ivan S. Martin - main artist, vocals (all tracks)
- Alejandro R. Martinez - main artist, producer, mixing, arranging
- Michelle "Belle" Miralles - featured artist, guest vocals (tracks 4, 8, 15)
- Pacheco - percussion (tracks 4, 7, 9, 15)
- David L.K. Thomas - main artist, vocals (tracks 1–7, 9, 11–15)
- Tokey - artwork
