= Look Out! (song) =

Single by Rusko
- Released: 26 January 2018
- Genre: Dubstep
- Length: 3:33
- Label: Self-released
- Producer(s): Christopher William Mercer

Rusko singles chronology
"Lift Me Up" (2013)	"Look Out!" (2018)	"Mr. Policeman" (2018)

"Look Out!" is a song by British dubstep producer and DJ Rusko. It was self-released on 26 January 2018.

== Background and release ==
In May 2017, it was revealed that Rusko had been diagnosed with gastric lymphoma, a rare type of stomach cancer and that he would take time off from producing music to receive treatment. In October, he appeared in an interview with electronic music publication website Your EDM, announcing that his treatment was successful and that he had become cancer-free.

The song was released on 26 January 2018 as a digital download and on music streaming services by Rusko. The song was marked as Rusko's first release since his collaborative extended play EP 2 with dubstep producer Caspa, released in 2016. Overall, he went through eight months between the start of his treatment and the release of "Look Out!".

== Critical reception ==
"Look Out!" was well received by most critics. Sadye Auren of Nest HQ called the song Rusko's "victory anthem", noting the songs' reggae influence and wrote that the song unveiled "a dynamic design of reverberation." Writing for Billboard, Jennica Abrams wrote that the song was as "fun and colourful as Rusko's ever been", nothing the songs' "old-school vibe" and describing it as one that fans would enjoy. Your EDM's Matthew Meadow described the song as a true "ode to classic Rusko sounds, complete with super crisp snares and heavy kicks, plenty of wobbles, horns, and those telltale UK sound bytes." Raz Ahmad of Earmilk stated that Rusko hadn't "lost a bit of his UK bass swagger", writing that he wasted "no time reminding us that there's no better dispenser of wobbly basslines married to buzzing synths, playful instrumentals, and wonky ambient vocal interjections than himself."

== Track listing ==
Digital download – Single
No.	Title	Length
1.	"Look Out!"	3:33
Total length:		3:33

== Release history ==
Region	Date	Format	Label	Ref.
Worldwide	26 January 2018	Digital download	Self-released	
