= Mentirosa =

Single by Mellow Man Ace

from the album Escape from Havana
- B-side: "Welcome to My Groove"
- Released: March 9, 1990
- Recorded: 1989
- Genre: Latin hip hop
- Length: 4:20
- Label: Capitol
- Songwriters: Ulpiano Reyes; Clarence "Sonny" Henry
- Producer: Tony G

Mellow Man Ace singles chronology
"Rhyme Fighter" (1989)	"Mentirosa" (1990)	"If You Were Mine" (1990)

"Mentirosa" (lit. "liar" (female)) is a song by Cuban-American rapper Mellow Man Ace from his debut album, Escape from Havana (1989). It was one of the first songs produced by Tony G, with scratches provided by Tony's fellow DJ at Los Angeles' KDAY radio station, Julio G (no relation, despite internet sites calling him Tony's brother). Released in March 1990 by Capitol Records, the song was Mellow Man Ace's lone hit single, peaking at number 14 on both the US Billboard Hot 100 and Cash Box Top 100, spending 24 and 16 weeks on these charts. "Mentirosa" was additionally certified Gold by the Recording Industry Association of America, and was 99th on the Billboard Year-End Hot 100 singles of 1990. The track is performed in Spanglish, and samples "No One to Depend On" and "Evil Ways" by Santana.

== Single track listing ==
1. "Mentirosa" (Radio Edit) – 4:16
2. "Mentirosa" (Extended Remix) – 6:08
3. "Welcome to My Groove" (Hurley's House of Trix Mix) – 4:30
4. "Welcome to My Groove" (Hurley's Deep House Mix) – 5:45
5. "Welcome to My Groove" (Hurley's Hip House Mix) – 5:56
6. "Welcome to My Groove" (Latin Hip House Mix) – 5:13

== Charts ==
=== Weekly charts ===
Chart (1990)	Peak position
UK Singles (OCC)	99
US Billboard Hot 100	14
US Hot Dance Music/Maxi-Singles Sales	10
US Hot Latin Tracks	34
US Hot R&B/Hip-Hop Singles & Tracks	60
US Hot Rap Singles	15
US Cash Box Top 100	14

=== Year-end charts ===
Chart (1990)	Position
US Billboard Hot 100	99
