= Can't Get the Best of Me =

2000 single by Cypress Hill

Single by Cypress Hill

from the album Skull & Bones
- B-side: "Highlife"^{[A]}
- Released: October 31, 2000
- Genre: Nu metal; rap metal
- Length: 4:15 (album version); 4:07 (radio edit)
- Label: Columbia
- Songwriters: Eric Lance Correa, Louis Freese, Lawrence Muggerud, Senen Reyes, Brad Wilk
- Producer: DJ Muggs

Cypress Hill singles chronology
| "Highlife" (2000) | "Can't Get the Best of Me" (2000) | "Trouble" (2001) |

Music video
- "Can't Get the Best of Me" on YouTube

"Can't Get the Best of Me" is a song by American hip hop group Cypress Hill. The song was released as a single from the group's fifth studio album, Skull & Bones.

== Track listing ==
| No. | Title | Length |
|---|---|---|
| 1. | "Can't Get the Best of Me" (Radio Edit) | 4:07 |
| 2. | "Highlife" (UK Radio Edit) | 3:52 |
| 3. | "Do You Know Who I Am" (LP Version) | 3:26 |
| 4. | "Can't Get the Best of Me" (Video Version) | 4:07 |
| Total length: | | 15:34 |

== Music video ==
The song's music video begins with a man in a locker room, lacing up his boots. The camera pans out to reveal a crowd of people in the room with him, who go into a factory for a fight. Another man is a bathroom alone getting ready for a fight, before he punches a mirror. The two men begin to fight while the crowd forms a circle pit around them. Many people are carried off from the fight, bloody and bruised. The two men return to the ring, standing back to back in the center of the crowd. Two other men join them before Sen Dog gives them a thumbs down and the crowd attacks them. The crowd engulfs the men, carrying two of them away and jumping the other two. The video ends with the same man at the video's start, sitting in the locker room and looking over his scars.

== Chart positions ==
| Chart (2000) | Peak Positions |
|---|---|
| GER | 99 |
| UK | 35 |

== Notes ==
- A "Can't Get the Best of Me" and "Highlife" were released together as a double A-side in the United Kingdom.
