= Rise Up (Cypress Hill album) =

Studio album by Cypress Hill
- Released: April 20, 2010
- Recorded: 2005–2009
- Genres: Hip-hop; rap rock; rap metal; nu metal
- Length: 58:11 (Standard edition); 73:00 (Exclusive edition)
- Label: Priority
- Producers: B-Real (also exec.); DJ Muggs; Scott Storch; Mike Shinoda; Tom Morello; J. R. Rotem; Scoop DeVille; Pete Rock; Tha Bizness; Jake One; Daron Malakian; Jim Jonsin; DJ Khalil; Sick Jacken

Cypress Hill chronology
Strictly Hip Hop: The Best of Cypress Hill (2010)	Rise Up (2010)	Cypress X Rusko (2012)

Singles from Rise Up
- 1. "Get 'Em Up" Released: August 18, 2009; 2. "It Ain't Nothin'" Released: January 28, 2010; 3. "Rise Up" Released: February 23, 2010; 4. "Armada Latina" Released: March 2, 2010

Rise Up is the eighth studio album by Cypress Hill, which was released on April 20, 2010. It is their first album of new material in six years, following 2004's Till Death Do Us Part, and their first to be released on EMI's Priority Records, their first venture away from Columbia, who handled all of their previous releases.

== Background ==
There was a gap of six years between Till Death Do Us Part and Rise Up, the longest between studio albums of Cypress Hill's recording career at the time of release. The group commenced work on the record in 2005, but had not entered studio work until 2008. The writing and recording process spanned four years and a number of recording studios and was finished in 2009.

Rise Up was delayed several times before its release. Originally scheduled to be released in 2006, it was later postponed to March 23, 2010 (exactly six years since the release of their last album), then again to April 6. The album's release date was finally set for April 20, 2010.

In terms of the album's musical direction, in March 2010 Cypress Hill emcee B-Real told noted UK urban writer Pete Lewis - Deputy Editor of the award-winning Blues & Soul - "Musically we wanted a bigger sound, a more AGGRESSIVE sound, and something obviously with a lotta DYNAMICS. You know, our sound has always been raw and gritty, ominous and moody... And, while this time we still wanted it to be raw and dark, we also wanted it to be more UPTEMPO. Because, in terms of the live setting, whenever we do songs that are more uptempo and aggressive people do love them and it makes for a great SHOW. So, while making this album, we definitely had the intention of making songs that would translate well to the live aspect of what Cypress Hill is about. So that, when we play these songs out, we're gonna get a magnificent reaction from the crowd!"

== Production ==
Rise Up marks a major shift in the group's sound, as it was the first of their albums not produced by founding member DJ Muggs. While Muggs does contribute co-production with DJ Khalil on two songs, B-Real takes on the role as main producer, executive producer and overseer of the project. Other producers include Mike Shinoda of Linkin Park, Jim Jonsin, Pete Rock, Jake One, Sick Jacken and Tom Morello.

Featured guests include Daron Malakian of System of a Down, Pitbull, Everlast, Evidence, Young De, Tom Morello of Rage Against the Machine and Audioslave, and Marc Anthony. Other artists like Ill Bill, Apathy, DJ Premier and Slash were also featured as guests but never made the final cut.

== Singles ==
The album's introduction single, "It Ain't Nothin'" was released as a free download from the group's official website with a music video by Matt Alonzo. "Rise Up", with Tom Morello, is the second single; it also features as the theme song for Elimination Chamber 2010 and the end-credit track for the Season 3 finale episode of the television show Silicon Valley.

== Reception ==
Professional ratings
Aggregate scores
Source	Rating
Metacritic	56/100
Review scores
Source	Rating
AllMusic	3.5/5 stars
Billboard	3/5 stars
Metal Hammer	7/10
MusicOMH	3/5 stars
PopMatters	5/10 stars
RapReviews	5.5/10
Record Collector	3/5 stars
Rolling Stone	3/5 stars
The Skinny	3/5 stars
Slant Magazine	1/5 stars

According to the review aggregator Metacritic, Rise Up received "mixed or average reviews" based on a weighted average score of 56 out of 100 from 15 critic scores.

PopMatters said, "As much as B-Real still seems lively, Sen Dog seems to have smoked himself out of being a rapper. He sounds exhausted and unimaginative all over this record. He doesn’t even appear on all of the tracks. This imbalance, coupled with the array of random producers, causes an inconsistency in the LP’s sound that hurts Rise Up."

An early review, Scottish magazine The Skinny offered a largely positive 3 stars (out of 5), noting that the album appears "less playful than its predecessor (2004’s Clash-sampling Till Death Do Us Part) but surprisingly more focused - given Muggs’ notable absence from the producer's chair – [The Hill] source inspired collaborations with Pete Rock, Jim Jonsin and Marc Anthony to reinforce their timeless agenda."

=== Commercial ===
Rise Up debuted on the Billboard 200 on April 28 at #19 selling 18,000 copies. The next week it fell over 50 spots to #72 on the Top 200 albums. In its third week the album fell off the Top 100 to #105 and has sold 31,000 copies to date.

== Track listing ==
Rise Up
No.	Title	Writer(s)	Producer(s)	Length
1.	"It Ain't Nothin" (featuring Young De)	Louis Freese; Senen Reyes; Demerick Ferm; Peabo Bryson	B-Real	4:01
2.	"Light It Up"	Freese; Reyes; Peter Phillips; Ferm; Lamont Dozier; Brian Holland; Eddie Holland	Pete Rock	3:17
3.	"Rise Up" (featuring Tom Morello)	Freese; Reyes; Tom Morello; Ferm	Tom Morello; B-Real	3:50
4.	"Get It Anyway"	Freese; Reyes; James Scheffer; Ferm; Mike Mani; Frank Romano; Jordan Omley	Jim Jonsin	4:20
5.	"Pass the Dutch" (featuring Evidence and The Alchemist)	Freese; Lawrence Muggerud; Khalil Abdul-Rahman; Michael Perretta; Alan Maman; Daniel Seeff	DJ Muggs; DJ Khalil	3:20
6.	"Bang Bang"	Freese; Reyes; Sonny Bono; Ferm	B-Real	3:49
7.	"K.U.S.H."	Freese; Ferm; Joaquin Gonzalez	Sick Jacken; B-Real	4:57
8.	"Get 'Em Up"	Freese; Reyes; Carlton Ridenhour; Keith Shocklee	B-Real	3:52
9.	"Carry Me Away" (featuring Mike Shinoda of Linkin Park)	Freese; Reyes; Mike Shinoda	Mike Shinoda	4:07
10.	"Trouble Seeker" (featuring Daron Malakian of System of a Down)	Freese; Reyes; Daron Malakian	Daron Malakian	3:39
11.	"Take My Pain" (featuring Everlast)	Freese; Muggerud; Abdul-Rahman; Daniel Tannenbaum; Erik Schrody	DJ Muggs; DJ Khalil	3:36
12.	"I Unlimited"	Freese; Reyes; Anne Dudley; Trevor Horn; Malcolm McLaren	B-Real	4:25
13.	"Armed & Dangerous"	Freese; Reyes; Jacob Dutton; Willie Hutch	Jake One; B-Real	3:27
14.	"Shut 'Em Down" (featuring Tom Morello)	Freese; Reyes; Morello	Morello; B-Real	3:26
15.	"Armada Latina" (featuring Pitbull and Marc Anthony)	Freese; Reyes; Scheffer; Marc Anthony; Armando Christian Perez; Stephen Stills	Jim Jonsin	4:04
Total length:				58:11

Exclusive edition bonus tracks
No.	Title	Length
16.	"Dead Man's Gun" (featuring Young De)	4:01
17.	"Rise Like Smoke"	3:45
18.	"Strike the Match"	3:33
19.	"Get Higher"	4:30
Total length:		73:00

Sample credits

- "It Ain't Nothin'" contains elements of "I'm So Into You", written and performed by Peabo Bryson.
- "Light It Up" contains a sample of "Standing in the Shadows of Love", written by Holland–Dozier–Holland, as performed by Barry White.
- "Bang Bang" contains samples from "Bang Bang", written by Sonny Bono, as performed by Vanilla Fudge.
- "Get 'Em Up" contains a sample from "Welcome to the Terrordome", written by Chuck D and Keith Shocklee, and performed by Public Enemy.
- "Take My Pain" contains elements of "Break On Through", written by John Densmore, Robby Krieger, Ray Manzarek, and Jim Morrison.
- "I Unlimited" contains a sample from "Buffalo Gals", written by Malcolm McLaren, Trevor Horn, and Anne Dudley, and performed by Malcolm McLaren.
- "Armed & Dangerous" contains a sample from "I Didn't Realize the Show Was Over", written by Willie Hutch, and performed by The Miracles.
- "Armada Latina" contains samples from "Suite: Judy Blue Eyes", written by Stephen Stills, and performed by Crosby, Stills & Nash.

== Personnel ==
- Louis Freese – vocals, producer
- Senen Reyes – vocals
- Lawrence Muggerud – executive producer
- Eric Correa – drums
- Khalil Abdul-Rahman – producer
- Marc Anthony – guest vocals
- David Benveniste – artists and repertoire
- Leota Blacknor – marketing
- Jacob Dutton – producer
- Nicole Frantz – creative director
- Brian Gardner – mastering
- Julio González – scratching
- Joaquin González – producer
- Frank Maddocks – art direction, design, photography
- Daron Malakian – producer, guitar
- Alan Maman – guest vocals

- Deborah Mannis-Gardner – sample clearance
- Malcolm McLaren – additional producer
- James Minchin III – photography, band photo
- Tom Morello – producer, guitars, bass
- Armando Pérez – guest vocals
- Michael Perretta – guest vocals
- Peter Phillips – producer
- Frank Romano – guitars, bass
- James Scheffer – producer
- Erik Schrody – guest vocals
- Bob Semanovich – marketing
- Demerick Shelton – guest vocals
- Mike Shinoda – guest vocals, producer
- Rob Stevenson – artists and repertoire
- Jay Turner – scratching, programming

== Charts ==
=== Weekly charts ===
Chart (2010)	Peak position
Austrian Albums (Ö3 Austria)	14
Belgian Albums (Ultratop Flanders)	53
Belgian Albums (Ultratop Wallonia)	68
Canadian Albums (Billboard)	15
Dutch Albums (Album Top 100)	85
French Albums (SNEP)	36
German Albums (Offizielle Top 100)	31
Scottish Albums (Official Charts)	80
Swiss Albums (Schweizer Hitparade)	3
UK Albums (Official Charts)	78
US Billboard 200	19
US Top R&B/Hip-Hop Albums (Billboard)	5

=== Year-end charts ===
Chart (2010)	Position
Swiss Albums (Schweizer Hitparade)	98
US Top R&B/Hip-Hop Albums (Billboard)	96

== Release history ==
Country	Date
China	April 13, 2010
Germany	April 16, 2010
France	April 17, 2010
Australia	April 19, 2010
United Kingdom	April 19, 2010
Canada	April 20, 2010
Hungary	April 20, 2010
United States	April 20, 2010
Japan	April 21, 2010
Brazil	April 23, 2010
