= Rusko (musician) =

British electronic musician

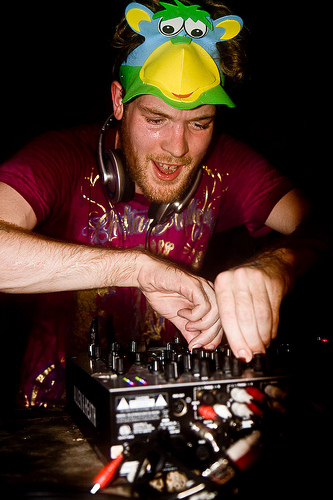
- Rusko in June 2010

Background information
- Also known as: Christopher Mercer; Rusko Banton
- Born: 26 January 1985 (age 41); Leeds, England
- Origin: York, England
- Genres: Dubstep; drum and bass; skweee; electronic
- Occupations: Producer; DJ
- Years active: 2006–2026
- Labels: 2nd Drop; Storming; Dub Police; Sub Soldiers; Mad Decent; MapleMusic; Owsla; Monstercat

Christopher William Mercer (born 26 January 1985), known by stage name Rusko, is a British electronic music producer and DJ from York, England.

== Early life and education ==
Rusko was born on 26 January 1985 in Leeds and brought up in nearby York. He grew up in Wheldrake, just outside of the city, and attended Fulford School. He later graduated from Leeds College of Music.

== Career ==
Immersed in the world of dubstep through Leeds based event "Sub Dub" which was held at the West Indian Centre, Rusko moved to London to work with the record label Sub Soldiers with now no longer associated act Caspa.

On 26 October 2012, Fact Magazine posted an interview with Rusko where he stated he planned to release his music for free instead of signing with Mad Decent again, following his dispute with the record label about the release of his second album. The Kapow EP was his first self-release. In 2013 he joined Owsla.

In 2015, Rusko and his former production/DJ partner Caspa announced a reunion with their first American show together.

Rusko announced in 2026 that he was going on an indefinite hiatus.

== Health ==
On 4 May 2017, Rusko announced on Twitter that he had been diagnosed with gastric lymphoma and would be cancelling all events in summer 2017 while undergoing treatment, with his first cycle of chemotherapy completed on 31 May 2017. On 24 October 2017, Rusko appeared in an interview with Your EDM and announced he was given the all-clear. He returned to the stage on 23 February 2018.

== Discography ==
=== Albums ===
- FabricLive.37 (with Caspa) (2007)
- O.M.G.! (2010)
- Songs (2012)

=== Singles and extended plays ===
- SNES Dub / Hornz Cru / Tru Powwa (Dub Police 2006)
- Acton Dread / Cockney Flute (Rusko Remix) — Rusko / Caspa (Dub Police 2007)
- Babylon: Volume 1 (Sub Soldiers 2007)
- BetaMax / Bed Bugz — Rusko / The Others (Veri Lo Records 2007)
- William H Tonkers / Roma (2nd Drop 2007)
- Dubstep Warz / Get Your Cock Out — D1 / Rusko (Dub Files 2008)
- Gone 2 Far / 2 N A Q (Sub Soldiers 2008)
- Mr Chips / Hammertime (Sub Soldiers 2008)
- Babylon: Volume 2 (Sub Soldiers 2009)
- Cockney Thug (Sub Soldiers 2009)
- Woo Boost (Mad Decent 2010) No. 194 UK
- Hold On (featuring Amber Coffman) (Mad Decent 2010) No. 96 UK
- Everyday / Lick The Lizard (Mad Decent 2011) No. 106 UK
- Somebody To Love (Mad Decent 2012)
- Thunder (featuring Bonnie McKee) (Mad Decent 2012)
- Roll It, Light It (with Cypress Hill) (V2/Cooperative Music 2012)
- Can't Keep Me Down (with Cypress Hill) (featuring Damian Marley) (V2/Cooperative Music 2012)
- Cypress X Rusko (with Cypress Hill) (V2/Cooperative Music 2012)
- Kapow EP (Self-released 2012)
- Lift Me Up (Owsla 2013)
- ! EP (FMLY 2014)
- Look Out! (Self-released 2018)
- Has Made 5 More Songs (Circus Records 2018)
- Mr. Policeman (Self-released 2018)
- Squeeze (Burnin) (Deadbeats 2019)
- Megarad EP (Deadbeats 2019)
- Bounce (with Subtronics) (Cyclops Recordings 2019)
- Genghis Danger (Deadbeats 2019)
- Sauce (Wakaan 2020)
- Mac 19 (Elevate Records 2021)
- Shut Ya Mouth EP (Souped Up 2021)
- Butcher Shop (Elevate Records 2022)
- Wassup (Monstercat 2024)
- 1 Man Army EP (Monstercat 2025)

=== Remixes ===
- 2006 Skream – "Dutch Flowers (Rusko Remix)" (Not on Label)
- 2007 Caspa – "Cockney Flute (Rusko Remix)" (Dub Police)
- 2007 Mike Lennon – "When Science Fails (Rusko Remix)" (Z Audio)
- 2008 Leon Jean Marie – "Bring It On (Rusko's Granny Smasher Remix)" (Island Records)
- 2008 Adele – "Cold Shoulder (Rusko Remix)" (XL Recordings)
- 2008 Kid CuDi – "Day & Night" (Not on Label)
- 2008 Katy Perry – "I Kissed A Girl" (Not on Label)
- 2008 D. Kay – "Fire (Rusko Remix)" (Not on Label)
- 2008 Audio Bullys – "Flickery Vision (Rusko's Staying Awake Remix)" (Vizo Records)
- 2008 HK119 – "C'est La Vie" (Rusko Masher) (One Little Indian)
- 2008 L-Wiz – "Girl From Codeine City" (Dub Thiefs)
- 2008 Kotchy – "Sing What You Want (Rusko's Skwee Remix)" (Civil Music / Seclusiasis)
- 2009 Marco Del Horno – "Samurai (Rusko 'Safe Sex' Remix)" (Bullet Train Records)
- 2009 The Prodigy – "Take Me to the Hospital" (Rusko Remix) (Ministry of Sound)
- 2009 Skunk Anansie – "I Can Dream (Rusko's Hands In The Air Remix)" (One Little Indian)
- 2009 Lady Gaga – "Alejandro (Rusko's Pupuseria Remix)" (Not on Label)
- 2009 Basement Jaxx – "Feelings Gone (Rusko Remix)" (XL Recordings)
- 2009 Little Boots – "Remedy (Rusko's Big Trainers Remix)" (679)
- 2009 Mr Hudson – "White Lies (Rusko's Euphoria Remix)" (Mercury)
- 2010 Kid Sister – "Pro Nails (Rusko Remix)" (Asylum Records)
- 2010 Kelis – "4th of July (Rusko Remix)" (Interscope Records)
- 2010 Rusko – "Bionic Commando (Rusko Remix)" (Bionic Records)
- 2010 Sub Focus featuring Coco – "Splash (Rusko Remix)" (RAM Records)
- 2010 The Temper Trap – "Soldier On (Rusko Remix)" (Infectious Records)
- 2011 Sunday Girl vs. Rusko – "Stop Hey" (Polydor)
- 2011 Netsky - "Everyday (Rusko Remix)" (UKF Music)
- 2013 Left Boy – "Get It Right" (Made Jour Label)
- 2016 Pegboard Nerds featuring Johnny Graves - "Just Like That (Rusko Remix)" (Monstercat)
- 2016 Giorgio Moroder - "Parity Error" (Rusko Remix) (Sumthing Else Music Works)
- 2019 PLS&TY - "Rebel Love (Rusko Remix)" (Self-released)
- 2019 Boogie T - "Supa Fly (Rusko Remix)" (Drama Club Recordings)
- 2020 Lele Pons featuring Susan Diaz and Victor Cardenas - "Volar" (Rusko Remix)
