= OMG (album) =

O.M.G.!

Studio album by Rusko
- Released: 4 May 2010
- Length: 57:00
- Label: Mad Decent
- Producer: Chris Mercer

Professional ratings
Review scores
Source	Rating
NME	5/10
Pitchfork	6.7/10

O.M.G.! is the debut studio album of British dubstep musician Rusko. It was released 3 May 2010 in the UK and 4 May in the US. The album contains the singles "Woo Boost" and "Hold On".

The song "Woo Boost" was featured on the soundtrack of the commercially successful 2011 video game Saints Row: The Third.

== Track listing ==
No.	Title	Length
1.	"Woo Boost"	4:09
2.	"Hold On (featuring Amber Coffman of Dirty Projectors)"	4:34
3.	"Rubadub Shakedown (featuring Rod Azlan)"	3:39
4.	"Dial My Number"	5:08
5.	"I Love You"	3:04
6.	"Kumon Kumon"	3:26
7.	"Scareware (featuring Redlight)"	4:43
8.	"Raver’s Special"	4:37
9.	"Feels So Real (featuring Ben Westbeech)"	4:37
10.	"You’re on My Mind Baby"	4:02
11.	"Got Da Groove (featuring Gucci Mane)"	3:12
12.	"Oy (featuring Crookers)"	3:57
13.	"My Mouth"	4:25
14.	"District Line"	4:34
Total length:		57:00
