= Cara Lewis =

American talent agent

- Born: The Bronx
- Occupation: Talent agent (music)
- Years active: 1982-present
- Employer(s): Cara Lewis Group; CEO and founder
- Awards: Billboard Power 100; Billboard Women in Music; Pollstar Hall of Fame
- Website: clewisgroup.com

Cara Lewis is an American talent agent. A "dominant force in hip hop" since her career began in the 1980s, she is the founder and CEO of the Cara Lewis Group.

== Career ==
Lewis, who was born and raised in The Bronx, began her career in the music industry answering phones at the talent agency Norby Waters Associates in 1980. She was mentored by Waters, who mainly represented Black artists such as the Commodores and The Jackson 5. Lewis signed and helped to develop Run-DMC.LL Cool J, Beastie Boys, Public Enemy, Queen Latifah, MC Lyte, and Lisa Lisa over eight years at the agency. She also signed Eric B. & Rakim, who name-checked her in their 1986 single "Paid in Full ." ( "Cara Lewis is our agent, word up...")

In 1988, she was hired as an agent at William Morris Agency. Over the course of her 23-year tenure at WMA, which later merged with Endeavor Talent Agency to become WME, she represented artists including Public Enemy, Tupac Shakur, Run-DMC, Eminem, 50 Cent, Nas, Kanye West, Beastie Boys, Rihanna, Erykah Badu, Jill Scott, The Roots, Common, and Ludacris, establishing "an unusual influence in the worlds of hip-hop and R&B on the strength of her extensive client roster." She left William Morris in 2011 and joined CAA in 2012.

In 2016, Lewis launched the Cara Lewis Group (CLG), where her focus broadened to include branding, sponsorship, and live‑event strategy. Eminem, The Roots, Scott, Badu, and Ludacris, among others, followed her from CAA to CLG. CLG later signed Travis Scott, Khalid, Don Toliver, Bryson Tiller, Vic Mensa, and Ice Spice.

== Notable tours ==
Lewis co-created the Smokin' Grooves tour, a "response to Lollapalooza that brought rap to the masses" in 1996. She was a producer of Scott's Astroworld Tour, which was cancelled when 10 people were fatally crushed during Scott's performance in Houston. She booked Eminem’s 2014 stadium tour with Rihanna, which grossed $31 million, and his shows in Australia, which drew 300,000 fans in five nights.

== Recognition ==
Lewis has made multiple appearances on Billboard's Power 100, Touring Power Players, and Hip Hop Power Players. She has been regularly featured in the magazine's annual Women in Music issue, which named her executive of the year in 2025. She was inducted into Pollstar’s Women of Live Hall of Fame and won the Bobby Brooks Award for Agent of the Year at the 2018 Pollstar Awards. In 2023, she was named to Pollstar’s Impact 50.
