= (Rock) Superstar =

2000 song performed by Cypress Hill

Single by Cypress Hill

from the album Skull & Bones
- B-side: "(Rap) Superstar"^{[A]}
- Released: February 29, 2000
- Genre: Nu metal; rap rock
- Length: 4:37
- Label: Columbia
- Songwriters: Louis Freese, Lawrence Muggerud, Senen Reyes
- Producer: DJ Muggs

Cypress Hill singles chronology
"(Rap) Superstar" (2000)	"(Rock) Superstar" (2000)	"Highlife" (2000)

Music video
- "(Rock) Superstar" on YouTube

"(Rock) Superstar" is the second single from Cypress Hill's fifth studio album, Skull & Bones. It was originally released as a double A-side with its standard rap counterpart on February 29, 2000 in the UK. An individual release was available starting sometime in April.

== Background and composition ==
Sony executive Donnie Ienner suggested adding guitars, which took the song "to a new level." Cypress Hill put the song into both the hip-hop and alternative markets, because they had fans in both places. The song features Deftones' Chino Moreno in the spoken word intro.

== Music video ==
Dean Karr directed the music video for the song. The song's music video is very similar to the previous single, "(Rap) Superstar", with the man picking up a ticket that says "Rock Superstar" on it. After giving the ticket to Sen Dog, the man enters into a fun house. A group of women dress up the man in a suit before he wanders off. After seeing a testimony from Everlast on a TV screen, the man encounters many record executives. At the video's climax, he is chased out after going to a performance by Cypress Hill. As the man exits the fun house, it blows up behind him.

Coal Chamber bassist Nadja Peulen appears in a cameo as the bass player of the band performing at the song's climax.

== Use in other media ==
The song is featured in the 2001 film Training Day. It was also in the film Little Nicky.

The song is featured in the 2000 video game MTV Sports: Skateboarding featuring Andy Macdonald, released on PC and various consoles.

The instrumental is used as an intro at the beginning of each hour on the nationally syndicated radio and television sports talk show The Dan Patrick Show, and is also used in a small game called Alien Battlecraft Arena.

The song is featured twice in the American Dad! episode "The Boring Identity". The first is when Steve becomes a paperboy and is introduced to their best worker, Roger. The second time is during a montage of the two "hustling" to earn extra money.

The song is featured in the intro to the first Twisted Metal episode WLUDRV. It is diegetic, as the protagonist is seen starting the song and singing along, an in-universe soundtrack to a car chase that he seems to be enjoying.

== Track listing ==
No.	Title	Length
1.	"(Rock) Superstar"	4:37
2.	"Checkmate" (Hang 'Em High Remix)	4:03
3.	"Fist Full" (Ft. Defahi)	3:23
Total length:		12:03

== Charts ==
Chart (2000)	Peak position
US Billboard Modern Rock Tracks	18
Sweden (Hitlistan)	50
UK Singles Chart	13

== Certifications ==
Region	Certification	Certified units/sales
New Zealand (RMNZ)	Gold	15,000^{‡}
United States (RIAA)	Platinum	1,000,000^{‡}
^{‡} Sales+streaming figures based on certification alone.

== Notes ==
- A "(Rap) Superstar" and "(Rock) Superstar" were released together as a double A-side single in the United Kingdom.
