= Brandhärd =

Hip-hop group from Switzerland

Brandhärd is a hip hop group from Basel-Country in Switzerland. It is best known in the German-speaking parts of Switzerland.

== History ==
The three friends Johny Holiday, Fetch and Fierce founded Brandhärd in 1997. Two years later they already performed in front of remarkably big audiences. In 2000 their first demo tape Hip-Hop für d'Aiightgnossäschaft was released.

2005, Brandhärd released the album Zeiche setze, which peaked at position 13 in the Swiss Music Charts. Two years later, Brandhärd released an album with rapper Mamoney from Cameroun. This album is called Même Sang, which means "Same Blood" in English.

On September 11, 2015, the album Zuckerbrot & Peitsche was released. This album reached the band's highest chart position to date. In 2018, the best-of album 1997 was released to mark the band's 20th anniversary.

== Discography ==
- 2000 – Hip-Hop für d'Aiightgnossäschaft
- 2001 – Brandalarm
- 2001 – Flächebrand
- 2003 – Noochbrand
- 2005 – Zeiche setze
- 2007 – Même Sang (with Mamoney)
- 2007 – Brandrenalin
- 2010 – Blackbox
- 2015 – Zuckerbrot & Peitsche
- 2018 – 1997
