= Mellow Man Ace =

Cuban American rapper (born 1967)

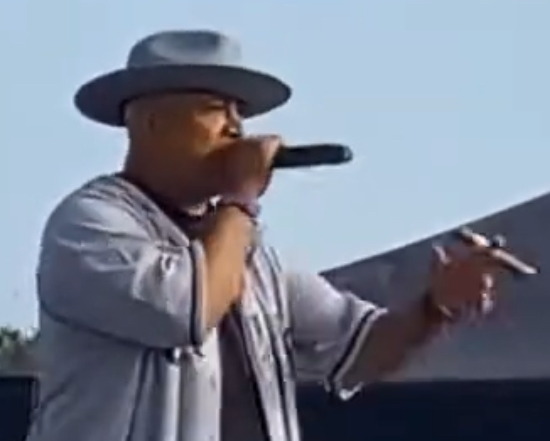
- Mellow Man Ace performing in 2022

Background information
- Birth name: Ulpiano Sergio Reyes
- Born: April 12, 1967 (age 58); Pinar del Río, Pinar del Río Province, Cuba
- Origin: South Gate, California, U.S.
- Genres: Hip hop; West Coast hip hop; Latin hip hop
- Years active: 1987–present
- Labels: Capitol; EMI; X-Ray; Dimelo; Latin Thug; Royal Bloodline Records
- Formerly of: Cypress Hill

Ulpiano Sergio Reyes (born April 12, 1967), better known as Mellow Man Ace, is a Cuban-American rapper known for bilingual delivery and novelty rhymes. He was born in Cuba and moved to Los Angeles with his family at the age of four.

== Early life and career ==
A Cuban rapper born in Cuba, Mellow Man Ace focused on lovers rap with a blend of urban hip hop and occasional bilingual delivery, and a heady gift for novelty rhymes. Born Ulpiano Sergio Reyes in 1967, he left Cuba with his family at the age of four and resettled in Los Angeles. His family moved to South Gate, California at a very young age. His debut album Escape from Havana was released on Capitol on August 29, 1989, and featured production from the Dust Brothers and Def Jef. The single "Mentirosa" was released on March 9, 1990. It was his only hit single, peaking at Number 14 on Billboard's Hot 100 Chart, with Ace rapping over a crafty hook from the Santana songs "No One to Depend On" and "Evil Ways". His use of these songs got him into some legal trouble, as he had not obtained permission to sample Santana's songs, nor were any royalty fees paid to Santana before recording and releasing the track. Ace recorded one additional album, The Brother with Two Tongues, before virtually retiring from the music scene, but 2000 saw the release of the album From the Darkness into the Light. Next came the album Vengo a Cobrar. It was released on June 8, 2004, on Dimelo Records. In 2006, he collaborated with his brother Sen Dog of hip-hop group Cypress Hill, culminating in the album release Ghetto Therapy. 2010 saw the release of the album Restoring Order. In 2018, he released the single, "South Gate".

Mellow Man Ace was also a founding member of the hip hop group Cypress Hill and member of the Latin Alliance project.

== Discography ==
Studio albums

- Escape from Havana (1989)
- The Brother with Two Tongues (1992)
- From the Darkness into the Light (2000)
- Vengo a Cobrar (2004)
- Restoring Order (2010)

Collaboration albums

- Latin Alliance with Latin Alliance (1991)
- Ghetto Therapy with Reyes Bros (2006)
- La Familia Vol. 1 with Various Artists (2008)

Charting singles

Year	Title	Hot 100	Rap	R&B	Dance	Latin	Album
1989	"Rhyme Fighter"	—	17	—	—	—	Escape from Havana
1990	"Mentirosa"	14	15	60	10	34	Escape from Havana
1992	"What's It Take to Pull a Hottie (Like You)?"	—	—	92	—	—	The Brother with Two Tongues

== Filmography ==
- Only the Strong (1993) — Student rapper
- Heroes of Latin Hip Hop (2002)

== See also ==
- Afro-Latinos
