= Sen Dog =

Cuban-American rapper (born 1965)

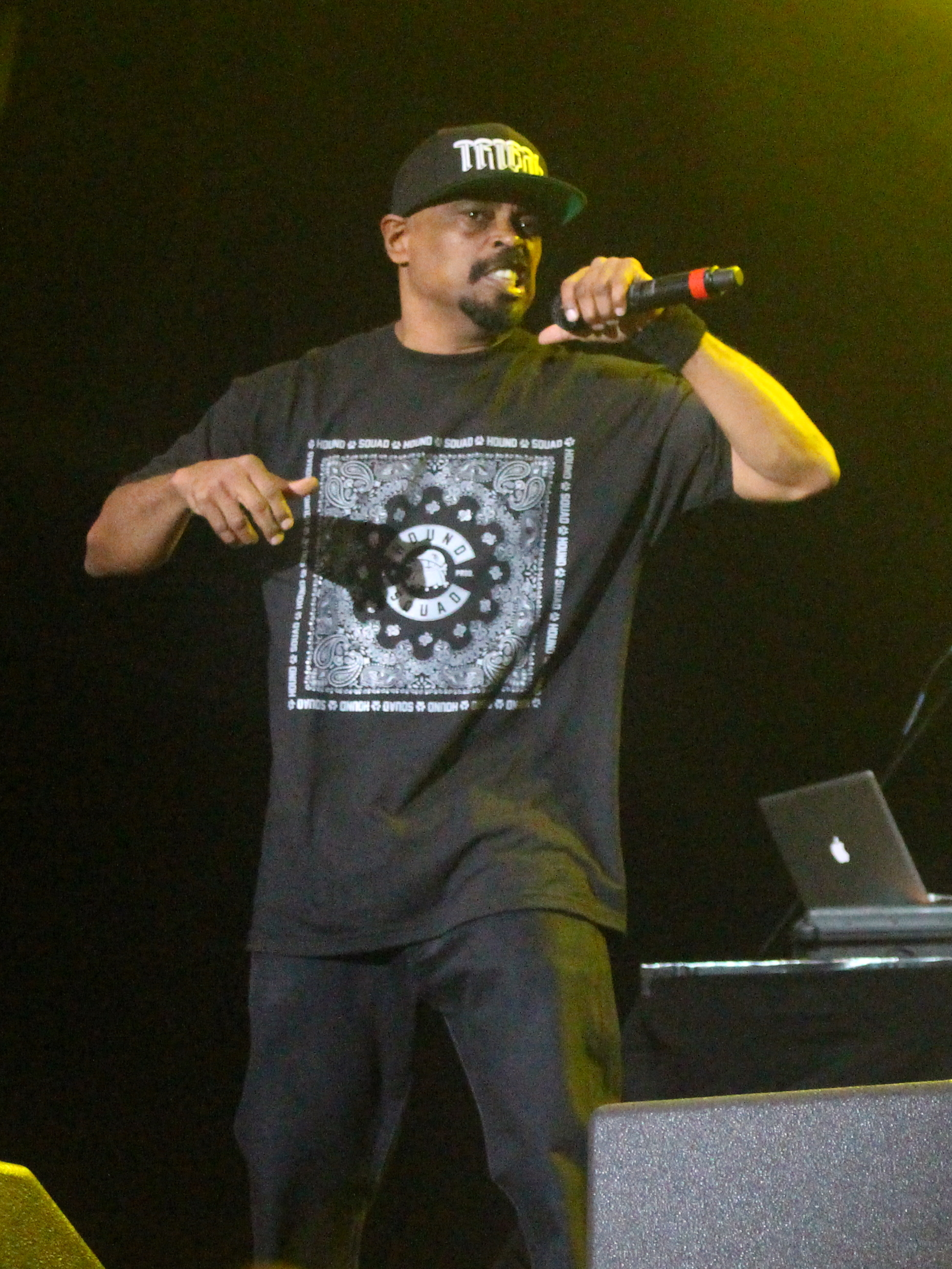
- Sen Dog performing in 2016

Background information
- Born: Senen Reyes; November 22, 1965 (age 60); Pinar del Río, Cuba
- Origin: South Gate, California, U.S.
- Genres: West Coast hip-hop; rap rock; rap metal; nu metal
- Occupations: Rapper; actor
- Years active: 1986–present
- Labels: Columbia; Ruffhouse; Sony; Suburban Noize
- Member of: Cypress Hill; SX-10; Powerflo

Senen Reyes (born November 22, 1965), also known by his stage name Sen Dog, is a Cuban-American rapper and actor who is best known as a member of the hip-hop group Cypress Hill and as the lead vocalist for the nu metal band Powerflo. He has nurtured a solo career in addition to his work with Cypress Hill and Powerflo, and is the lead vocalist for rap rock band SX-10.

== Career ==
Sen Dog is a member of the rap group Cypress Hill, with whom he has had multiple albums in the Top 10 on the Billboard 200 album chart (including the No. 1 album Black Sunday). Some of the most well-known songs that he performs with Cypress Hill are "How I Could Just Kill a Man", "(Rap) Superstar"/"(Rock) Superstar" and "Insane in the Brain".

In the late 1990s, Sen Dog took a leave of absence from Cypress Hill to develop a new rock/rap band called SX-10. He wanted the band to have a funk sound with Latin influences. SX-10 released an album in 2000 called Mad Dog American. In 1996, he performed "Quien Es Ese Negro (Who's That Black Dude)" with Mellow Man Ace, MC Skeey, Mr. Rico, and DJ Rif for the AIDS benefit album, Silencio=Muerte: Red Hot + Latin, produced by the Red Hot Organization.

On September 30, 2008, Sen Dog released his first solo album, Diary of a Mad Dog, seventeen years after the release of the first Cypress Hill album. In an interview with HipHopDX, Sen Dog described how he felt that he had more control and could talk about personal aspects of his life with this album. He said, "With Cypress, I never really felt that comfortable to put personal aspects of my life into the music. It feels good to have the opportunity to be the quarterback, if you want to call it that, in the studio, and be creative. I definitely found that I had more in me than I thought I did." He said that he wanted to have fun with this album and that he has tried out a lot of different types of music but had no agenda for the type of music on Diary of a Mad Dog. "We've done the whole dark, morbid thing. The rock n' roll crossover; just a lot of things. I'm not going to have an agenda on this; I'm going to jam and record whatever is fun to me."

== Personal life ==
In the 1980s, Sen Dog was affiliated with a Bloods gang set known as "Neighborhood Family", and later introduced his friend and later bandmate, B-Real into the set before B-Real was shot in the lung in 1988. Sen Dog is known to be an avid marijuana smoker and Cypress Hill has made songs about the use of marijuana, including “ Stoned is the Way of the Walk”, "Legalize it", "I Wanna Get High" and "Hits from the Bong". Sen Dog gave B-Real his first joint when Sen Dog was 17 years old. In an interview with Entertainment Weekly Sen Dog said, "Pot got a bad name with the flower children of the '60s, and then all these hard drugs came in, and people started dropping like flies. Today, people want to get high on something that's not going to give them a heart attack, like speed or crack."

Reyes and former Slayer drummer Dave Lombardo are childhood friends who attended the same high school.

He is the older brother of Mellow Man Ace (born Ulpiano Sergio Reyes). Reyes currently resides in Las Vegas, Nevada.

== Discography ==
=== Solo ===
- Diary of a Mad Dog (2008)

=== With Cypress Hill ===
- Cypress Hill (1991)
- Black Sunday (1993)
- III: Temples of Boom (1995)
- IV (1998)
- Skull & Bones (2000)
- Stoned Raiders (2001)
- Till Death Do Us Part (2004)
- Rise Up (2010)
- Cypress x Rusko (2012)
- Elephants on Acid (2018)
- Back in Black (2022)
- Dios Bendiga (2026)

=== With SX-10 ===
- Mad Dog American (2000)
- Temple of Tolerance (Unreleased) (2006)
- EP (2008)

=== With The Reyes Brothers ===
- Ghetto Therapy (2006)

=== With Powerflo ===
- Powerflo (2017)
- Bring That Shit Back! (2018)
- Gorilla Warfare (2024)

=== Guest appearances ===
Year	Title	Artist(s)	Album
1992	"Hypest from Cypress"	Mellow Man Ace, Krazy-D, Tomahawk Funk	The Brother with Two Tongues
1994	"How It Is"	Biohazard, DJ Lethal	State of the World Address
1995	"Feel the Blast"	DJ Hurricane	The Hurra
1997	"IFO" (uncredited)	Hed PE	Hed PE
1998	"Quien Es Ese Negro (Who Is That Black One)"	MC Skeey, Mr. Rico, DJ Rif, Mellow Man Ace	Silencio=Muerte: Red Hot + Latin
1998	"It's the Delinquentes"	Delinquent Habits	Here Come The Horns
1998	"Shed a Tear"	Delinquent Habits	Here Come The Horns
1998	"Life Is a Struggle"	Delinquent Habits	Here Come The Horns
1998	"Get Up, Get on It"	Delinquent Habits, Mellow Man Ace, Rude	Here Come The Horns
1998	"Sen Dog"	Everlast	Whitey Ford Sings the Blues
2000	"Feel tha Steel"	Mellow Man Ace	From the Darkness into the Light
2000	"Sly Slick & Wicked"	Mellow Man Ace	From the Darkness into the Light
2000	"Quem Tem Seda?"	Planet Hemp	A Invasão Do Sagaz Homem Fumaça
2000	"We the People"	Kottonmouth Kings	High Society
2001	"Last Man Standing"	Biohazard	Uncivilization
2001	"What's Next?"	Phunk Junkeez	Sex, Drugs and Rap N' Roll
2001	"1-2, 1-2"	Insolence	Revolution
2004	"Vengo A Cobrar"	Mellow Man Ace	Vengo A Cobrar
2005	"Not Today"	Transplants	Haunted Cities
2005	"Smockaz Roule"	Big Red, DJ Muggs	Raggamuffin Culture
2007	"Living on the Edge"	Big B	More to Hate
2007	"Dark Side"	Kottonmouth Kings	Cloud Nine
2008	"Shoot Em Up"	OPM	Golden State of Mind
2009	"Bloody Sunday"	La Coka Nostra	A Brand You Can Trust
2009	"1 Life"	B-Real, Mal Verde	Smoke N Mirrors
2009	"Bring tha Noize" (Public Enemy cover)	Subnoize Souljaz, Daddy X	Blast from tha Past
2010	"All Day"	1FIFTY1	Lyrics Anonymous
2010	"Just What You Feelin"	Kemo The Blaxican	Upside of Struggle
2012	"West Coast Rock Steady"	P.O.D.	Murdered Love
2013	"Senny Sosa"	Eric Bobo, Latin Bitman	Welcome to the Ritmo Machine
2013	"Evening News"	Cuete Yeska	Tales Of Cuete James
2014	"Dubmundos"	Raimundos	Cantigas De Garagem
2016	"Shit Just Got Real"	Die Antwoord	Mount Ninji and da Nice Time Kid
2017	"California"	Delinquent Habits	It Could Be Round Two
2017	"One Two Three"	Delinquent Habits	It Could Be Round Two
2020	"Pure 90"	Shaka Ponk	Apelogies

=== Mixtapes ===
- Collabo Killa (2000)
- Fat Joints Volume 1 (2007)

== See also ==
- List of Cuban Americans
- Afro-Latin Americans
