= Cypress Hill discography =

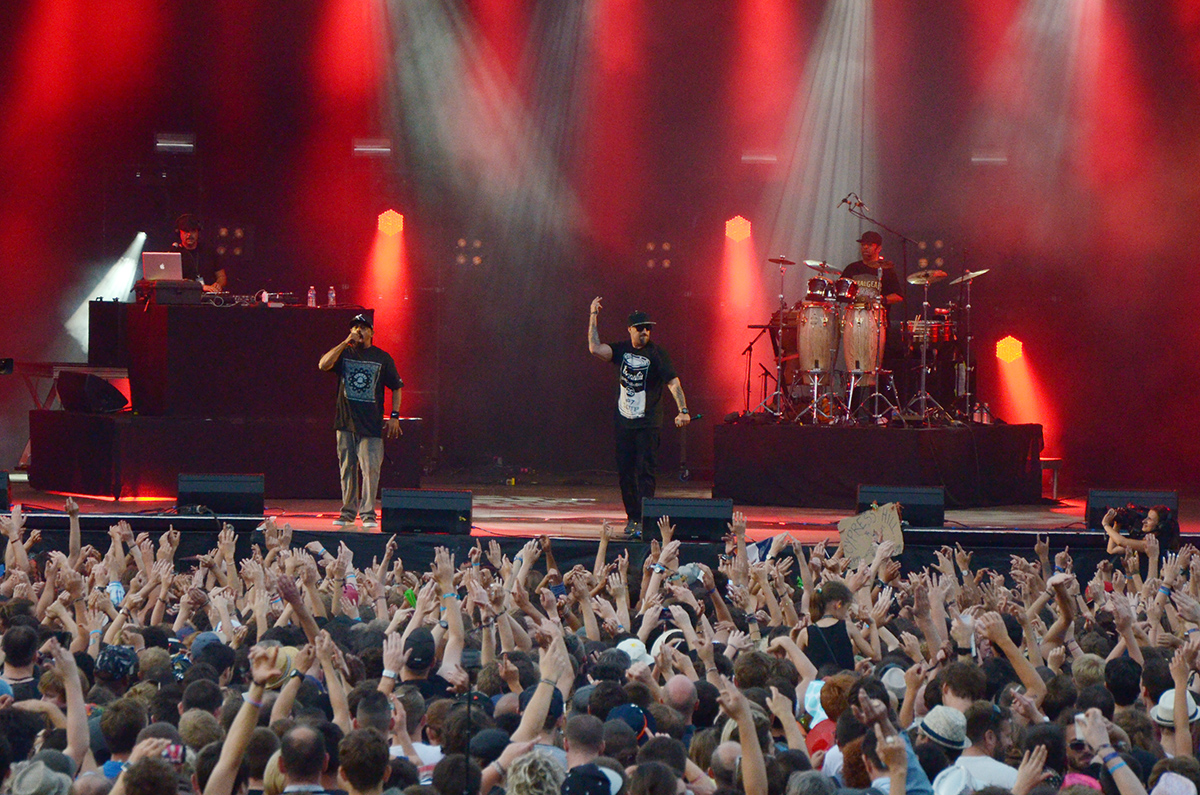
- Studio albums: 10
- Extended plays: 5
- Live albums: 1
- Compilation albums: 5
- Singles: 37

This is a comprehensive listing of official releases by American hip hop group Cypress Hill.

== Albums ==
=== Studio albums ===
List of studio albums, with selected chart positions, sales figures and certifications
Title	Album details	Peak chart positions										Sales	Certifications
Title	Album details	US	US R&B	AUS	AUT	CAN	FRA	GER	NZ	SWI	UK	Sales	Certifications
Cypress Hill	Released: August 13, 1991; Labels: Ruffhouse, Columbia; Formats: CD, LP, cassette	31	4	85	—	—	—	—	—	—	81		RIAA: 2× Platinum; BPI: Gold
Black Sunday	Released: July 20, 1993; Labels: Ruffhouse, Columbia; Formats: CD, LP, cassette	1	1	13	—	7	—	36	2	38	13	US: 3,400,000	RIAA: 4× Platinum; ARIA: Gold; BPI: Platinum; IFPI SWI: Gold; MC: 3× Platinum
Cypress Hill III: Temples of Boom	Released: October 31, 1995; Labels: Ruffhouse, Columbia; Formats: CD, LP, cassette	3	3	8	23	4	12	19	4	12	11		RIAA: Platinum; BPI: Gold; MC: Gold
Cypress Hill IV	Released: October 6, 1998; Labels: Ruffhouse, Columbia; Formats: CD, LP, cassette	11	11	22	21	3	7	17	27	14	25		RIAA: Gold; BPI: Gold; MC: Gold; SNEP: Gold
Skull & Bones	Released: April 25, 2000; Label: Columbia; Formats: CD, LP, cassette	5	4	6	5	3	13	4	13	7	6		RIAA: Platinum; BPI: Gold; MC: Platinum
Stoned Raiders	Released: December 4, 2001; Label: Columbia; Formats: CD, LP, cassette	64	26	61	24	—	54	26	—	19	71	US: 258,000	BPI: Silver
Till Death Do Us Part	Released: March 23, 2004; Label: Columbia; Formats: CD, LP, cassette, digital download	21	23	28	10	31	30	11	16	11	53	US: 204,000	
Rise Up	Released: April 20, 2010; Label: Priority, EMI; Formats: CD, LP, digital download	19	5	57	14	15	36	31	—	3	78		
Elephants on Acid	Released: September 28, 2018; Label: BMG; Formats: CD, LP, digital download	120	—	—	16	—	74	27	—	9	64		
Back in Black	Released: March 18, 2022; Label: MNRK; Formats: CD, LP, digital download	—	—	—	56	—	123	17	—	12	—		
Dios Bendiga	Released: July 24, 2026; Label: Hybe Latin America; Formats: CD, LP, digital download	—	—	—	—	—	—	—	—	39	—		
"—" denotes a recording that did not chart or was not released in that territory.

=== Compilation albums ===
Year	Album details	Peak chart positions										Certifications
Year	Album details	US	US Latin	US R&B	AUT	FRA	GER	IRL	NLD	SWI	NZ	Certifications
1999	Los grandes éxitos en español: Released: December 7, 1999; Label: Ruffhouse, Columbia; Formats: CD, CS, LP, DI	—	6	—	27	58	50	—	75	38	—	RIAA: Platinum (Latin)
2005	Greatest Hits from the Bong: Released: December 13, 2005; Label: Columbia; Formats: CD, DI	30	—	14	40	—	—	100	—	61	25	
2008	Super Hits: Released: March 25, 2008; Label: Sony; Formats: CD, DI	—	—	—	—	—	—	—	—	—	—	
2008	Collections: Released: 2008; Label: Sony; Formats: CD, DI	—	—	—	—	—	—	—	—	—	—	
2010	Strictly Hip Hop: The Best of Cypress Hill: Released: 2010; Label: Sony; Formats: CD, DI	—	—	—	—	—	—	—	—	—	—	
2014	The Essential Cypress Hill: Released: October 14, 2014; Label: Sony, Legacy; Formats: CD, DI	—	—	—	—	—	—	—	—	—	—	UK: Silver
"—" denotes a release that did not chart.

=== Live albums ===
Year	Album details	Peak chart positions				
Year	Album details	US	US R&B	AUT	SWI	UK
2000	Live at the Fillmore: Released: December 12, 2000; Label: Columbia; Formats: CD, CS, LP, DI	119	72	47	82	188

== EPs ==
Year	EP details	Peak chart positions										Certifications
Year	EP details	US	US R&B	FIN	FRA	GER	NZ	NLD	SWE	SWI	UK	Certifications
1992	Something for the Blunted: Released: 1992; Label: Columbia; Formats: CD	—	—	—	—	—	—	—	—	—	—	
1996	Unreleased and Revamped: Released: August 13, 1996; Label: Ruffhouse, Columbia; Formats: CD, CS, LP, DI	21	15	24	29	60	41	56	50	28	29	RIAA: Gold; BPI: Silver
1997	Four from IV: Released: 1997; Label: Columbia; Formats: CD	—	—	—	—	—	—	—	—	—	—	
1999	Body Parts: Released: 1999; Label: Columbia; Formats: CD	—	—	—	—	—	—	—	—	—	—	
2002	Stash: Released: July 2, 2002; Label: Columbia; Formats: CD, CS, DI	—	—	—	—	—	—	—	—	—	—	
2004	Smoke 'Em If You Got 'Em: Released: 2004; Label: Columbia; Formats: CD	—	—	—	—	—	—	—	—	—	—	
"—" denotes a release that did not chart.

=== Collaborative EPs ===
Year	EP details
2012	Cypress x Rusko: Released: July 17, 2012; Label: V2; Formats: LP, CD, DI

== Singles ==
Year	Song	Peak chart positions											Certifications	Album
Year	Song	US	US Alt.	US R&B	US Rap	AUS	GER	IRL	NZ	SWE	SWI	UK	Certifications	Album
1991	"How I Could Just Kill a Man"^{[A]}	77	—	—	1	—	—	—	—	—	—	—	RIAA: Gold	Cypress Hill
1991	"The Phuncky Feel One"^{[A]}	77	—	—	1	—	—	—	—	—	—	—		Cypress Hill
1991	"Hand on the Pump/Real Estate"^{[B]}	—	—	106	2	—	—	—	—	—	—	—		Cypress Hill
1991	"Pigs"	—	—	—	—	—	—	—	—	—	—	—		Cypress Hill
1992	"Latin Lingo"^{[C]}	—	—	105	12	—	—	—	—	—	—	—		Cypress Hill
1993	"Insane in the Brain"	19	—	27	1	40	93	18	12	—	—	21	RIAA: 3× Platinum; BPI: Platinum	Black Sunday
1993	"When the Shit Goes Down"	—	—	—	—	47	—	25	5	—	—	19		Black Sunday
1993	"I Ain't Goin' Out Like That"	65	—	86	21	43	—	19	6	40	—	15		Black Sunday
1994	"Lick a Shot"	—	—	—	—	—	—	—	—	—	—	20		Black Sunday
1995	"Throw Your Set in the Air"	45	—	60	11	29	83	19	7	13	—	15		III: Temples of Boom
1996	"Illusions"^{[D]}	103	—	87	31	—	—	—	33	—	—	23		III: Temples of Boom
1996	"Boom Biddy Bye Bye"	87	—	73	19	—	—	—	—	—	—	—		III: Temples of Boom
1996	"Ice Cube Killa"	—	—	—	—	—	—	—	—	—	—	—		Non-album single
1998	"Dr. Greenthumb"	72	—	57	14	—	47	—	—	—	—	34		IV
1998	"Tequila Sunrise" (featuring Barron Ricks)	70	—	—	—	70	—	—	—	—	48	23		IV
1998	"Audio X" (featuring Barron Ricks)	—	—	—	—	—	—	—	—	—	—	—		IV
1999	"No Entiendes la Onda"	—	—	—	—	—	—	—	—	—	—	—		Los grandes éxitos en español
1999	"Siempre Peligroso" (featuring Fermin IV of Control Machete)	—	—	—	—	—	—	—	—	—	—	—		Los grandes éxitos en español
1999	"Worldwide"	—	—	—	—	—	—	—	—	—	—	—		Skull & Bones
2000	"(Rap) Superstar"^{[E]}	—	—	87	43	—	22	39	34	—	21	13		Skull & Bones
2000	"(Rock) Superstar"^{[E]}	—	18	—	—	—	—	—	—	50	—	13	RIAA: Platinum	Skull & Bones
2000	"Highlife"^{[F]}	—	—	—	—	—	—	—	—	—	—	35		Skull & Bones
2000	"Can't Get the Best of Me"^{[F]}	—	—	—	—	—	99	—	—	—	—	35		Skull & Bones
2000	"I Ain't Goin' Out Like That"	—	—	—	—	—	—	—	—	—	—	—		Live at the Fillmore
2001	"Lowrider"^{[G]}^{[H]}	—	—	108	—	74	39	—	—	—	70	33		Stoned Raiders
2001	"Trouble"^{[H]}	—	—	—	—	—	39	—	—	—	70	33		Stoned Raiders
2004	"What's Your Number"^{[I]} (featuring Tim Armstrong)	—	23	106	—	56	41	—	8	—	42	44		Till Death Do Us Part
2004	"Latin Thugs" (featuring Tego Calderón)	—	—	—	—	—	—	—	—	—	—	—		Till Death Do Us Part
2009	"Get 'Em Up"	—	—	—	—	—	—	—	—	—	—	—		Rise Up
2010	"It Ain't Nothin'" (featuring Young De)	—	—	—	—	—	—	—	—	—	—	—		Rise Up
2010	"Rise Up" (featuring Tom Morello)	—	20	—	—	—	—	—	—	—	—	—		Rise Up
2010	"Armada Latina"^{[J]} (featuring Pitbull & Marc Anthony)	106	—	—	25	—	—	—	—	—	—	—		Rise Up
2017	"Reefer Man"	—	—	—	—	—	—	—	—	—	—	—		Grow House (soundtrack)
2018	"Band of Gypsies"	—	—	—	—	—	—	—	—	—	—	—		Elephants on Acid
2018	"Crazy"	—	—	—	—	—	—	—	—	—	—	—		Elephants on Acid
2018	"Muggs Is Dead"	—	—	—	—	—	—	—	—	—	—	—		Elephants on Acid
2018	"Locos"	—	—	—	—	—	—	—	—	—	—	—		Elephants on Acid
2021	"Open Ya Mind"	—	—	—	—	—	—	—	—	—	—	—		Back In Black
2022	"Bye Bye" (featuring Dizzy Wright)	—	—	—	—	—	—	—	—	—	—	—		Back In Black
2022	"Champion Sound"	—	—	—	—	—	—	—	—	—	—	—		Back In Black
2022	"Hit 'Em"	—	—	—	—	—	—	—	—	—	—	—		Madden NFL 23
2025	"Street X Street" (with Sia and DJ Flict)	—	—	—	—	—	—	—	—	—	—	—		Non-album single
2026	"Wacha Trucha" (featuring Alemán)	—	—	—	—	—	—	—	—	—	—	—		Dios Bendiga
2026	"Campeones" (featuring Mellow Man Ace)	—	—	—	—	—	—	—	—	—	—	—		Dios Bendiga
2026	"Estamos Listos"	—	—	—	—	—	—	—	—	—	—	—		Dios Bendiga
"—" denotes a release that did not chart.

=== As featured artist ===
Year	Song	Album
2012	"Failbait" (deadmau5 featuring Cypress Hill)	> album title goes here <

=== Collaborative singles ===
Year	Song	Peak chart positions	Album
Year	Song	SWI	Album
2002	"Child of the Wild West" (with Roni Size)	75	Blade II (soundtrack)
2012	"Roll It, Light It" (with Rusko)	—	Cypress x Rusko
2012	"Can't Keep Me Down" (with Rusko featuring Damian Marley)	—	Cypress x Rusko

=== Other certified songs ===
Year	Song	Certifications	Album
1993	"Hits from the Bong"	RIAA: Platinum; BPI: Silver	Black Sunday

=== Guest appearances (including B-Real & Sen Dog) ===
Year	Song	Artist	Album
1991	"Shoot 'Em Up"	—N/a	Juice (soundtrack)
1992	"Ain't Got No Class"	Da Lench Mob	Guerillas in tha Mist
1992	"Put Your Head Out"	House of Pain	Fine Malt Lyrics
1993	"Wopbabalubop"	Funkdoobiest	Which Doobie U B?
1993	"Under Mi Sleng Teng Remix" (Muggs Old School Remix)	Wayne Smith	Non-album single
1993	"Real Thing"	Pearl Jam	Judgment Night (soundtrack)
1994	"How It Is"	BiohaZard	State of the World Address
1995	"Roll It Up, Light It Up, Smoke It"	—N/a	Friday (soundtrack)
1996	"Hit 'Em High (The Monstars' Anthem)"	Coolio, Method Man, LL Cool J, Busta Rhymes	Space Jam: Music from and Inspired by the Motion Picture
1996	"East Coast/West Coast Killas"	RBX, KRS-One, Nas	Dr. Dre Presents: The Aftermath
1996	"The Last Assassin"	—N/a	The Cable Guy (soundtrack)
1997	"I'm Still #1"	—N/a	In tha Beginning...There Was Rap
1997	"Men of Steel"	Shaquille O'Neal, Peter Gunz, KRS-One, Ice Cube	Steel (soundtrack)
1997	"Wishful Thinking"	Big Pun, Fat Joe, Kool G Rap	Non-album single
1997	"Battle of 2001"	DJ Muggs	The Soul Assassins, Chapter I
1997	"The Way We Run It"	MC Eiht	Last Man Standing
1998	"Lunatics in the Grass"	Sick Jacken	Bulworth (soundtrack)
1999	"Smokefest 1999"	Tash, Outkast	Rap Life
1999	"Splitt (Comin' Out Swingin')"	Reveille	Laced
2000	"No Retreat"	Dilated Peoples	The Platform
2000	"Deadly Assassins"	Everlast	Eat at Whitey's
2000	"Guillotine Tactics"	Mellow Man Ace	From the Darkness.... Into the Light
2000	"Feel tha Steel"	Mellow Man Ace	From the Darkness.... Into the Light
2000	"Sly Slick & Wicked	Mellow Man Ace	From the Darkness.... Into the Light
2000	"U Know the Rulez (Mi Vida Loca)"	Tony Touch	The Piece Maker
2000	"Xplosion"	OutKast	Stankonia
2001	"Last Laugh"	Chino XL	I Told You So
2001	"Back the Fuck Up"	Fear Factory	Digimortal
2001	"Cisco Kid"	Method Man & Redman, War	How High (soundtrack)
2001	"Peer Pressure"	De La Soul	AOI: Bionix
2001	"Real Wunz"	Jinusean	The Reign
2002	"Skirrrt"	Coolio	El Coolio Magnifico
2003	"Champions"	PMD	The Awakening
2003	"911"	Boo-Yaa T.R.I.B.E., Eminem	West Koasta Nostra
2004	"American Psycho II"	D12	D12 World
2004	"Bang Out"	The Alchemist	1st Infantry
2004	"Get With It"	The X-Ecutioners	Revolutions
2005	"FanDangO"	DJ Quik	Trauma
2005	"High Rollers"	Proof	Searching for Jerry Garcia
2005	"Get U Down"	Warren G	In the Mid-Nite Hour
2005	"Roll Up"	Supernatural	S.P.I.T.
2005	"Killafornia"	Transplants	Haunted Cities
2005	"Step Yo Game Up"	Mack 10	Hustler's Handbook
2005	"Put It Down"	Kottonmouth Kings	Kottonmouth Kings
2005	"Play That Song"	Tony Touch, Nina Sky	The ReggaeTony Album / La Conexión
2006	"Vato"	Snoop Dogg	Tha Blue Carpet Treatment
2008	"Apocalypse Now"	Eric Bobo	Meeting of the Minds
2008	"A to the K"	Akrobatik	Absolute Value
2008	"9mm"	Planet Asia & DJ Muggs	Pain Language
2008	"Pain Gang"	Ill Bill	The Hour of Reprisal
2008	"Living in the Fog"	Prozak	Tales from the Sick
2008	"Cold World"	Cashis, Young De	Homeland Security
2009	"I'm an American"	La Coka Nostra	A Brand You Can Trust
2009	"Fuck Tony Montana"	La Coka Nostra	A Brand You Can Trust
2009	"Paradise City"	Slash	Non-album single
2009	"How Hi Can U Get"	Tash	Control Freek
2009	"Shoot First"	Apathy, Celph Titled	Wanna Snuggle?
2010	"Amputated Saint"; Kill Devil Hills"	Ill Bill & DJ Muggs	Kill Devil Hills
2011	"Go Loco"	Ron Artest	Ball'n
2011	"Beat Goes On"	Travis Barker	Give the Drummer Some
2012	"One by One"	Adil Omar	The Mushroom Cloud Effect
2012	"Killer's Remorse"	Xzibit, Bishop Lamont	Napalm
2012	"Untouchable"	Laetita Larusso	Angels Are Gone
2013	"Hit This Freestyle"	Tony Touch	Return of the 50 MCs
2013	"Fuck Out My Face"	ASAP Ferg, Onyx, Aston Matthews	Trap Lord
2014	"Overdose"	Statik Selektah, JFK	What Goes Around
2015	"Darkness Falls"	Demrick, Xzibit, Cali Cleve	Losing Focus
2015	"Caliente"	Chanel West Coast	Waves
2016	"Handshakes with Snakes"	Apathy, Sick Jacken, Mariagraza	Handshakes with Snakes
2016	"Get Hi"	Danny Brown	Atrocity Exhibition
2016	"My Smoking Song"	Lil Wyte, JellyRoll	No Filter 2
2017-2018-2019	"WarPorn Industry"	Everlast, Sick Jacken, Divine Styler	WarPorn
2017-2018-2019	"Last Night"	Berner, Cozmo	Sleepwalking
2017-2018-2019	"Bong Song"	Xzibit, Garrick Grout	Grow House (OST)
2017-2018-2019	"Mount Kushmore"	Snoop Dogg, Method Man, Redman	Neva Left
2017-2018-2019	"Pass Me By"	MC Eiht	Which Way Iz West
2017-2018-2019	"Black Cadillac"	Hollywood Undead	V
2017-2018-2019	"Shakem Up"	Statik Selektah, Everlast	8
2017-2018-2019	"Turkey Bag"	Berner, Styles P	Vibes
2017-2018-2019	"Last Night"	Berner, Styles P, Cozmo	Vibes
2017-2018-2019	"What It Sound Like"	Berner	RICO
2017-2018-2019	"Nada"	Berner	11/11
2017-2018-2019	"Sippin' Ace"	King Lil G	Paint the City Blue
2017-2018-2019	"Touchdown"	Berner, Mozzy, Rexx Life Raj	Slimey Individualz
2017-2018-2019	"Zero Fux"	Kool Keith	Keith
2020	"GRID"	Public Enemy, George Clinton	What You Gonna Do When the Grid Goes Down?
2021	"Dolce and Stiletto"	Baby Bash	Playamade Mexicanz III
2021	"Blacks n Mexicans"	Ty $, Schoolboy Q	Gully (soundtrack)
2023	"Dump on Em"	Soul Assassins, Ice Cube	SA3: Death Valley
2023	"Fuego"	Geto Pros	Fragments of Eternity
2024	"Let's Get $$$ Together"	Ice Cube	Man Down
2024	"Dumb Down"	Craig G	The World Is Cooked!
2025	"Higher"	Xzibit, Redman	Kingmaker

== Music videos ==
=== As lead artist ===
Year	Album	Title	Director	Other featured artist
1991	Cypress Hill	How I Could Just Kill a Man	David Perez Shadi	
1991	Cypress Hill	Hand on the Pump	n/c	
1991	Cypress Hill	The Phuncky Feel One	n/c	
1992	Cypress Hill	Stoned Is the Way of the Walk	Jake Scott	
1992	Cypress Hill	Real Estate	Jake Scott	
1992	Cypress Hill	Latin Lingo	n/c	
1993	Black Sunday	Insane in the Brain	Josh Taft	
1993	Black Sunday	When the Shit Goes Down	F. Gary Gray	
1993	Black Sunday	I Ain't Goin' Out Like That	F. Gary Gray	
1995	Temples of Boom	Throw Your Set in the Air	McG	
1995	Temples of Boom	Illusions	McG	
1996	Unreleased and Revamped	Boom Biddy Bye Bye (Fugees Remix)	Dante Ariola	
1996	Unreleased and Revamped	Throw Your Hands in the Air		Redman, MC Eiht, Erick Sermon
1998	IV	Tequila Sunrise	Kevin Kerslake	Barron Ricks
1998	IV	Dr. Greenthumb	Estevan Oriol	
1999	Los Grande Exitos en Español	No Entiendes La Onda	Estevan Oriol	
2000	Skulls & Bones	(Rock) Superstar	Dean Karr	Everlast
2000	Skulls & Bones	(Rap) Superstar	Dean Karr	Eminem, N.O.R.E.
2000	Skulls & Bones	Can't Get the Best of Me	Chris Hafner	
2001	Stoned Raiders	Lowrider	Frank Borin & Ryan Smith	
2001	Stoned Raiders	Trouble	Chris Robinson	
2004	Til Death Do Us Part	What's Your Number?	Dean Karr	Tim Armstrong
2010	Rise Up	Rise Up	n/c	Tom Morello
2010	Rise Up	Armada Latina	Matt Alonzo	Pitbull, Marc Anthony
2010	Rise Up	Light It Up	Tim McGurr	
2010	Rise Up	It Ain't Nothin'	Matt Alonzo	Young De
2012	Cypress x Rusko	Roll It, Light It	Jonathan Desbiens	Rusko
2012	Cypress x Rusko	Lez Go	Guy Logan	Rusko, Travis Barker
2014	Cypress x Rusko	Shots Go Off	Louis Garcia	Rusko
2017	Elephants on Acid	Reefer Man	Anthony Hayward	
2018	Elephants on Acid	Band of Gypsies	DJ Muggs	
2018	Elephants on Acid	Muggs Is Dead	Felix Colgrave	
2018	Elephants on Acid	Crazy	Jeremy Danger	
2018	Elephants on Acid	Blood on my Hands Again	DJ Muggs	
2018	Elephants on Acid	Locos	Jason Goldwatch	Sick Jacken
2021	Back in Black	Champion Sound	n/c	Black Milk
2022	Back in Black	Certified	Tillavision	Demrick
2022	Back in Black	Come With Me	Myster DL	
2026	Dios Bendiga	Wacha Trucha	Sergio de Avila	Alemán
2026	Dios Bendiga	Campeones	n/c	Mellow Man Ace
2026	Dios Bendiga	Estamos Listos	Eric Bobo	

=== As featured artist ===
Year	Artist	Title	Director	Other featured artist
1992	Beastie Boys	So What Cha Want (Remix)	David Perez Shadi	
1992	Get the Fist Movement	Get the Fist	n/c	King T, Yo-Yo (rapper), MC Eiht, Da Lench Mob, Kam, Threat, Ice Cube, DJ Pooh
1993	Funkdoobiest	Wapbabalubop	n/c	
2002	Roni Size	Child of the Wild West	Marcos Siega	
2005	Kottonmouth Kings	Put It Down	Dale Resteghini	
2020	Public Enemy	GRID	David C. Snyder	George Clinton
2023	Trueno	Fuck El Police	El Dorado	

== Notes ==
- A "How I Could Just Kill a Man" and "The Phunky Feel One" were released together as a double A-side single in the United States.
- B "Hand on the Pump" did not enter the Hot R&B/Hip-Hop Songs chart, but peaked at number 6 on the Bubbling Under R&B/Hip-Hop Singles chart, which acts as a 25-song extension to the R&B/Hip-Hop Songs chart.
- C "Latin Lingo" did not enter the Hot R&B/Hip-Hop Songs chart, but peaked at number 5 on the Bubbling Under R&B/Hip-Hop Singles chart, which acts as a 25-song extension to the R&B/Hip-Hop Songs chart.
- D "Illusions" did not enter the Billboard Hot 100, but peaked at number 3 on the Bubbling Under Hot 100 Singles chart, which acts as a 25-song extension to the Hot 100.
- E "(Rap) Superstar" and "(Rock) Superstar" were released together as a double A-side single in the United Kingdom.
- F "Highlife" and "Can't Get the Best of Me" were released together as a double A-side single in the United Kingdom.
- G "Lowrider" did not enter the Hot R&B/Hip-Hop Songs chart, but peaked at number 8 on the Bubbling Under R&B/Hip-Hop Singles chart, which acts as a 25-song extension to the R&B/Hip-Hop Songs chart.
- H "Lowrider" and "Trouble" were released together as a double A-side single in several European territories.
- I "What's Your Number" did not enter the Hot R&B/Hip-Hop Songs chart, but peaked at number 6 on the Bubbling Under R&B/Hip-Hop Singles chart, which acts as a 25-song extension to the R&B/Hip-Hop Songs chart.
- J "Armada Latina" did not enter the Billboard Hot 100, but peaked at number 6 on the Bubbling Under Hot 100 Singles chart, which acts as a 25-song extension to the Hot 100.
