= Collections (Cypress Hill album) =

Compilation album by Cypress Hill
- Released: 2008
- Recorded: 1993–2003
- Genre: Hip-hop
- Length: 35:19
- Label: Sony Music; 88697252692
- Producer: DJ Muggs

Cypress Hill chronology
Super Hits (2008)	Collections (2008)	Strictly Hip Hop: The Best of Cypress Hill (2010)

Collections is a compilation album by hip-hop group Cypress Hill. It was released in 2008 and forms part of Sony Music's budget Collections series. The album consists of singles and album tracks taken from Black Sunday, Cypress Hill III: Temples of Boom, Cypress Hill IV and Stoned Raiders.

== Track listing ==
Collections
No.	Title	Length
1.	"Insane in the Brain"	3:30
2.	"Amplified"	3:51
3.	"Legalize It"	0:48
4.	"Throw Your Set in the Air"	4:08
5.	"Illusions"	4:30
6.	"Tequila Sunrise(*)"	3:59
7.	"Boom Biddy Bye Bye"	4:03
8.	"Memories"	4:10
9.	"I Wanna Get High"	2:56
10.	"Lick a Shot"	3:24

== Notes ==
(*) Although not credited as such, "Tequila Sunrise" was the 'Radio Edit' version.
