= Greatest Hits from the Bong =

Greatest hits album by Cypress Hill
- Released: December 13, 2005
- Recorded: 1989–2005
- Studios: Ameraycan Studios; Larrabee Sound Studios; Fred's Crib; B's Temple Of Boom
- Genre: Hip-hop
- Length: 48:11
- Label: Columbia
- Producers: Alchemist; Cypress Hill; DJ Khalil; Fredwreck; T-Ray

Cypress Hill chronology
Till Death Do Us Part (2004)	Greatest Hits from the Bong (2005)	Super Hits (2008)

Professional ratings
Review scores
Source	Rating
AllMusic	3.5/5 stars
PopMatters	6/10
RapReviews	4/10

Greatest Hits from the Bong is the greatest hits album by American hip-hop group Cypress Hill. It was released on December 13, 2005, via Columbia Records. Production was handled by Alchemist, DJ Khalil, Fredwreck, T-Ray and Cypress Hill themselves. It features guest appearances from Tego Calderón.

The compilation contains nine hit songs from previous albums and two new tracks, "EZ Come EZ Go" and "The Only Way". The disc also contains a bonus Reggaeton mix of "Latin Thugs" featuring Tego Calderon. European pressings contained an additional three bonus tracks. A European reissue, with substantially different artwork, was released in 2006 via Sony BMG Music Entertainment. Although this album is called Greatest Hits from the Bong, it does not include the song "Hits from the Bong".

== Track listing ==
No.	Title	Writer(s)	Producer(s)	Length
1.	"How I Could Just Kill a Man"	Louis Freese; Senen Reyes; Lawrence Muggerud; James David Walker; Lowell Fulsom	DJ Muggs	4:08
2.	"Hand on the Pump"	Freese; Muggerud; Brett Bouldin	DJ Muggs	4:02
3.	"Latin Lingo"	Freese; Reyes; Muggerud	DJ Muggs	3:59
4.	"Insane in the Brain"	Freese; Reyes; Muggerud	DJ Muggs	3:27
5.	"I Ain't Goin' Out Like That"	Freese; Muggerud; Todd Ray; John Michael Osbourne; Terence Butler; Anthony Frank Iommi; William Thomas Ward	T-Ray	4:24
6.	"Throw Your Set in the Air"	Freese; Muggerud	DJ Muggs	4:05
7.	"Dr. Greenthumb"	Freese; Muggerud	DJ Muggs	4:25
8.	"(Rock) Superstar"	Freese; Reyes; Muggerud	DJ Muggs	4:37
9.	"Latin Thugs" (featuring Tego Calderón)	Reyes; Tegui Calderón; Alan Maman	Alchemist	3:46
10.	"The Only Way"	Freese; Reyes; Khalil Abdul-Rahman; Burleigh Drummond; David Pack	DJ Khalil	3:42
11.	"EZ Come EZ Go"	Freese; Farid Nassar	Cypress Hill; Fredwreck	4:04
12.	"Latin Thugs (Reggaeton Mix)" (featuring Tego Calderón)	Reyes; Calderón; Maman	Alchemist; DJ Kazzanova	3:39
Total length:				48:11

European bonus Tracks
No.	Title	Writer(s)	Producer(s)	Length
13.	"Tequila Sunrise" (featuring Barron Ricks)	Freese; Muggerud; Barron Ricks	DJ Muggs	4:42
14.	"Can't Get the Best of Me"	Freese; Reyes; Muggerud; Eric Correa; Brad Wilk	DJ Muggs	4:13
15.	"Lowrider"	Freese; Reyes; Muggerud; Ulpiano Sergio Reyes	DJ Muggs	6:41

Notes

- Tracks 1 to 3 are taken from the 1991 album Cypress Hill
- Tracks 4 and 5 are taken from the 1993 album Black Sunday
- Track 6 is taken from the 1995 album III: Temples Of Boom
- Tracks 7 and 13 are taken from the 1998 album IV
- Tracks 8 and 14 are taken from the 2000 album Skull & Bones
- Track 9 is taken from the 2004 album Til Death Do Us Part
- Track 15 is taken from the 2001 album Stoned Raiders
- Tracks 10 to 12 were recorded in 2005.

== Personnel ==
- Louis "B-Real" Freese – rap vocals, producer & mixing (track 11)
- Senen "Sen Dog" Reyes – rap vocals
- Lawrence "DJ Muggs" Muggerud – producer (tracks: 1–4, 6–8, 13–15), mixing (tracks: 1–8, 13–15), arranger (tracks: 7–8, 13–15)
- Camillo Wong "Chino" Moreno – speech (track 8)
- Erik "Everlast" Schrody – speech (track 8)
- Tego Calderón – toasting (tracks: 9, 12)
- Barron Ricks – rap vocals (track 13)
- Todd Ray – producer (track 5)
- Alan "The Alchemist" Maman – producer (tracks: 9, 12)
- John Kirby – keyboards (track 10)
- Daniel Seeff – bass (track 10)
- Khalil Abdul-Rahman – producer (track 10)
- Farid "Fredwreck" Nassar – keyboards, guitar, producer, mixing (track 11)
- DJ Kazzanova – remixer (track 12)
- Joe "The Butcher" Nicolo – mixing (tracks: 1–5)
- Jason Roberts – recording (tracks: 1–3), engineering (tracks: 4–6)
- Michael Miller – recording (tracks: 1–3), engineering (tracks: 13–15)
- Troy Staton – additional mixing (track 8)
- Rob Hill – recording & mixing (track 9)
- Brian "Big Bass" Gardner – mastering (tracks: 10–11)
- James Cruz – mastering (track 12)
- Rob Abeyta – design
- Estevan Oriol – photography
- Ryan Ruden – coordinator
- Paul D. Rosenberg – management
- Tracy McNew – management

== Charts ==
Chart performance for Greatest Hits From The Bong
Chart (2006)	Peak position
Austrian Albums (Ö3 Austria)	40
New Zealand Albums (RMNZ)	25
Swiss Albums (Schweizer Hitparade)	61
