= Strictly Hip Hop: The Best of Cypress Hill =

Greatest hits album by Cypress Hill
- Released: 2010
- Recorded: 1991–2004
- Genre: Hip-hop
- Length: 63:37 (Disc 1); 62:28 (Disc 2)
- Label: Sony Music; 88697671332
- Producer: DJ Muggs

Cypress Hill chronology
Collections (2008)	Strictly Hip Hop: The Best of Cypress Hill (2010)	Rise Up (2010)

Strictly Hip Hop: The Best of Cypress Hill, is a 2010 compilation album by hip-hop group Cypress Hill. Released in a slipcased jewel case by Sony Music on their budget Camden Deluxe imprint, it contains single and album tracks, b-sides and remixes. The four-page booklet contains an essay by Agent J from the internet radio show Groovement Radio. The booklet, slip case and CD sleeve contain track listing errors (see 'Notes').

The album is named after the track that originally appeared on the album Cypress Hill III: Temples of Boom.

== Track listing ==
Strictly Hip Hop: The Best of Cypress Hill

Disc 1
No.	Title	Length
1.	"How I Could Just Kill a Man"	4:10
2.	"I Aint Goin' Out Like That"	4:28
3.	"Hand on the Pump"	4:04
4.	"Throw Your Set in the Air" (Club Remix*)	3:13
5.	"Strictly Hip Hop"	4:33
6.	"Hand on the Glock"	3:33
7.	"Latin Lingo" (Prince Paul Mix)	4:38
8.	"Checkmate" (Hang Em High Remix)	4:01
9.	"When the Ship Goes Down" (Extended*)	3:13
10.	"Lowrider"	6:42
11.	"What U Want from Me"	3:50
12.	"Another Victory"	3:12
13.	"Trouble"	5:01
14.	"Stoned Is the Way of the Walk"	2:47
15.	"Break 'Em Off Some"	2:45
16.	"Prelude to a Come Up" (featuring MC Eiht)	3:27

Disc 2
No.	Title	Length
1.	"Insane in the Brain"	3:29
2.	"Boom Biddy Bye Bye"	4:02
3.	"Dr. Greenthumb" (Fun Lovin' Criminals Remix*)	3:53
4.	"Hits from the Bong" (T-Ray's Mix)	4:24
5.	"I Wanna Get High"	2:56
6.	"Illusions"	4:29
7.	"Latin Lingo"	3:59
8.	"The Phuncky Feel One"	3:30
9.	"Lick a Shot"	3:24
10.	"Cock the Hammer"	4:23
11.	"(Goin' All Out) Nothin' to Lose"	3:53
12.	"Busted in the Hood"	4:04
13.	"Stank Ass Hoe"	5:11
14.	"Light Another"	3:17
15.	"Roll it up Again"	3:15
16.	"Can't Get the Best of Me"	4:17

== Notes ==
- "How I Could Just Kill a Man" is mistitled as How Could I Just Kill a Man.
- "Checkmate" is the Hang 'Em High Remix Radio Edit from the Stash EP and not the titled (and unedited) mix from the "(Rock) Superstar" CD single.
- "Can't Get the Best of Me" is the 'clean' Radio Edit.
- "Roll it up Again" was a bonus track on the Japanese version of the album Till Death Do Us Part and was also the b-side to the single "What's Your Number" (where it was titled simply "Roll it Up").
- The instrumental segues present after the album versions of some tracks (e.g. "Lowrider" and "Stank Ass Hoe") are maintained throughout and have not been removed.
- (*) This is the first time these remixes have been released on album.
