= Super Hits (Cypress Hill album) =

Greatest hits album by Cypress Hill
- Released: March 25, 2008
- Recorded: 1991–2004
- Genre: Hip-hop
- Length: 38:40
- Label: Sony Music; A 722139
- Producer: DJ Muggs

Cypress Hill chronology
Greatest Hits from the Bong (2005)	Super Hits (2008)	Collections (2008)

Professional ratings
Review scores
Source	Rating
AllMusic	3.5/5 stars

Super Hits is a compilation album by hip-hop group Cypress Hill. It was released in 2008 and forms part of Sony Music's budget Super Hits series. The album consists of single and album tracks taken from Cypress Hill, Black Sunday, Skull & Bones and Till Death Do Us Part. Although not noted as such, all tracks are the 'clean' versions and have all profanity removed.

== Track listing ==
Super Hits
No.	Title	Length
1.	"How I Could Just Kill a Man"	4:04
2.	"Latin Lingo"	3:58
3.	"Insane in the Brain"	3:35
4.	"I Ain't Goin' Out Like That"	4:26
5.	"When the Ship Goes Down"	3:12
6.	"Lick a Shot"	3:21
7.	"Dr. Greenthumb"	3:08
8.	"(Rap) Superstar"	4:52
9.	"Can't Get the Best of Me"	4:15
10.	"Once Again"	3:49

== Notes ==
- How I Could Just Kill a Man is the 'clean' 12" version.
- Insane in the Brain and When the Ship Goes Down are the 'clean' Radio Versions.
- Dr. Greenthumb is the 'Clean Radio Edit'.
- All other tracks are the 'clean' album versions.
