= Smoke 'Em If You Got 'Em (disambiguation) =

Smoke 'em if you got 'em may refer to:

== Television ==
- Becker (TV series), Episode#8 of Season#3

== Music ==
- Smoke 'Em If You Got 'Em (The Reverend Horton Heat album), 1990
- Smoke 'Em If You Got 'Em (Cypress Hill EP), 2004
- "Smoke 'Em If Ya Got 'Em", song on 2006 Parkway Drive album Killing with a Smile
- "Smoke 'Em", song on 1996 Fun Lovin' Criminals album Come Find Yourself
- “Smoke If You Got’um”, song on 2007 Rob Sonic album Sabotage Gigante

== Cinema ==
- Smoke 'Em If You Got 'Em (film), a 1988 Australian film
