= Unreleased and Revamped =

Unreleased & Revamped

EP by Cypress Hill
- Released: August 13, 1996
- Recorded: 1991–1996
- Genre: Hip hop
- Length: 35:58
- Label: Ruffhouse; Columbia
- Producer: Diamond D; DJ Muggs; Prince Paul; Q-Tip; T-Ray; Wyclef Jean

Cypress Hill chronology
Something for the Blunted (1992)	Unreleased & Revamped (1996)	Stash (2002)

Professional ratings
Review scores
Source	Rating
AllMusic	2/5 stars

Unreleased and Revamped is the second extended play by American hip hop group Cypress Hill. It was released in August 1996. This album was certified Gold by the Recording Industry Association of America.

The EP includes several of their songs of previous albums which have been remixed, along with a few unreleased songs that didn't make the group's previous albums.

== Track listing ==
Unreleased and Revamped
No.	Title	Length
1.	"Boom Biddy Bye Bye" (Fugees Remix) (featuring Fugees)	3:35
2.	"Throw Your Hands in the Air" (featuring Erick Sermon, Redman & MC Eiht)	4:08
3.	"Intellectual Dons" (featuring Call O' Da Wild)	4:27
4.	"Hand on the Pump" (Muggs' Blunted Mix) ("The Funky Cypress Hill Shit" Part 2)	4:42
5.	"Whatta You Know"	3:13
6.	"Hits from the Bong" (T-Ray's Mix)	4:25
7.	"Illusions" (Q-Tip Remix)	3:51
8.	"Latin Lingo" (Prince Paul Mix)	4:40
9.	"When the Ship Goes Down" (Diamond D Remix)	2:55

== Samples ==
Throw Your Hands in the Air

- "Leaves" by Pete Jolly

Intellectual Dons

- "Pacified" by Rita Jean Bodine
- "Your Mother Should Know" by The Beatles

Hand on the Pump (Muggs' Blunted Mix)

- "Put Your Head Out" by House of Pain
- "Can I Get Some Help" by James Brown
- "The Funky Cypress Hill Sh**" by Cypress Hill

Whatta You Know

- "Walk On By" by Isaac Hayes

Hits from the Bong (T-Ray Mix)

- "Don't Cha Hear Me Callin' to Ya" by Junior Mance
- "Smilin' Billy Suite Pt. II" by Heath Brothers
- "Song of the Second Moon" by Tom Dissevelt & Kid Baltan
- "Spinning Wheel" by Lonnie Smith

Latin Lingo (Prince Paul Mix)

- "Sing a Simple Song" by Sly & the Family Stone
- "Improvisation in Fourths" by Dick Hyman
- "Rocket in the Pocket (Live)" by Cerrone
- "Symphony No. 5" by Ludwig van Beethoven

When the Shit Goes Down (Diamond D Remix)

- "Stratus" by Billy Cobham
- "Black Bag" by Carl Holmes

== Personnel ==
- B-Real – vocals
- Sen Dog – vocals
- Leslie Brathwaite – remix assistant
- Call O'Da Wild – performer
- Diamond D – producer
- Sean Evans – art direction, design
- Wyclef Jean – guitar, producer, remixing
- Jerry Bass – producer
- Andy Kravitz – percussion
- Manuel Lecuona – mastering
- DJ Muggs – arranger, mixing
- Joe Nicolo – engineer, mixing
- Darin Prindle – remixing
- Jason Roberts – engineer, mixing
- Jason Stang – photography
- T-Ray – mixing
- A Tribe Called Quest – remixing
- Robert "Taj" Walton – engineer

== Charts ==
Album – Billboard (North America)

Year	Chart	Position
1996	The Billboard 200	21
1996	Top R&B/Hip-Hop Albums	15

== Certifications ==
Region	Certification	Certified units/sales
United Kingdom (BPI)	Silver	60,000^{*}
United States (RIAA)	Gold	500,000^{^}
^{*} Sales figures based on certification alone.^{^} Shipments figures based on certification alone.
