= Tequila Sunrise (Cypress Hill song) =

Single by Cypress Hill

from the album IV
- Released: September 1, 1998
- Studio: Ameraycan Studios (North Hollywood, CA)
- Genre: Hip hop
- Length: 4:44
- Label: Ruffhouse; Columbia
- Songwriters: Louis Freese; Senen Reyes; Lawrence Muggerud
- Producer: DJ Muggs

Cypress Hill singles chronology
"Ice Cube Killa" (1996)	"Tequila Sunrise" (1998)	"Dr. Greenthumb" (1998)

Barron Ricks singles chronology
"Tequila Sunrise" (1998)	"Come Up to My Room" (1999)

Music video
- "Tequila Sunrise" on YouTube

"Tequila Sunrise" is a song written and performed by American hip hop group Cypress Hill. It was released on September 1, 1998, through Ruffhouse/Columbia Records as the lead single from the group's fourth studio album IV. Recording sessions took place at Ameraycan Studios North Hollywood. Produced by member DJ Muggs, the album version features Barron Ricks (credited as B Smooth) of Call O' Da Wild. The Spanish version of the song titled "Tequila" appeared in Los grandes éxitos en español.

The single peaked at number 8 in Norway, number 23 in the UK and number 48 in Switzerland. A music video for the song was directed by Kevin Kerslake.

== Track listing ==
US CD Maxi-Single (44 79024)
No.	Title	Writer(s)	Length
1.	"Tequila Sunrise" (Radio Edit)	Louis Freese; Senen Reyes; Lawrence Muggerud	3:56
2.	"Tequila Sunrise (Clean LP Version)" (featuring B Smooth)	Freese; Barron Ricks; Muggerud	3:57
3.	"Tequila Sunrise (Remix Radio Edit)" (featuring Fat Joe)	Freese; Muggerud	3:15
4.	"Tequila Sunrise" (Spanish Version)	Freese; Reyes; Muggerud	3:57
5.	"Tequila Sunrise" (LP Instrumental)	Freese; Ricks; Muggerud	4:20
6.	"Dr. Greenthumb" (Radio Edit)	Freese; Muggerud	3:08
7.	"Dr. Greenthumb" (LP Version)	Freese; Muggerud	3:07
Total length:			25:40

EU CD Maxi-Single (COL 666325 2)
No.	Title	Writer(s)	Length
1.	"Tequila Sunrise" (Radio Edit)	Freese; Reyes; Muggerud	3:56
2.	"Tequila Sunrise (Remix Radio Edit)" (featuring Fat Joe)	Freese; Muggerud	3:15
3.	"Champions (LP Version)" (featuring PMD)	Freese; Parrish Smith; Muggerud	3:02
4.	"Tequila Sunrise" (Spanish Version)	Freese; Reyes; Muggerud	3:57

== Personnel ==
- Louis "B-Real" Freese – vocals
- Senen "Sen Dog" Reyes – vocals
- Lawrence "DJ Muggs" Muggerud – producer, arranger, mixing
- Barron Ricks – vocals
- Mike "Crazy Neck" Sims – guitar & bass on "Tequila Sunrise (Radio Edit)" and "Tequila Sunrise (Clean LP Version)"
- Eric "Bobo" Correa – percussion on "Tequila Sunrise (Radio Edit)"
- Troy Staton – engineering
- Manny Lecuona – mastering

== Charts ==
Chart (1998)	Peak position
Norway (VG-lista)	8
Switzerland (Schweizer Hitparade)	48
UK Singles (Official Charts)	23
UK Hip Hop/R&B (Official Charts)	5
