= Super Hits =

Super Hits may refer to:

- Super Hits (Time–Life Records), later AM Gold, a 1990s series of Top 40 compilation albums
- Super Hits (Alan Jackson album), 1999
- Super Hits, an album by Alice Cooper, 1999
- Super Hits (Big Audio Dynamite album), 1999
- Super Hits (Blood, Sweat & Tears album), 1998
- Super Hits (Brooks & Dunn album), 1999
- Super Hits (Charlie Daniels album), 1994
- Super Hits (Cypress Hill album), 2008
- Super Hits, an album by Donovan, 2000
- Super Hits (Eddie Money album), 1997
- Super Hits (Europe album), 1998
- Super Hits (Frank Sinatra album), 2000
- Super Hits (George Jones album), 1987
- Super Hits (Glen Campbell album), 2000
- Super Hits (Kenny Chesney album), 2007
- Super Hits, an album by Lila McCann, 2002
- Super Hits, an album by Lorrie Morgan, 1998
- Super Hits, an album by Mandy Moore, 2007
- Super Hits (Marvin Gaye album), 1970
- Super Hits (Miles Davis album), 2001
- Super Hits, an album by New Kids on the Block, 2001
- Super Hits, an album Peabo Bryson, 2000
- Super Hits (Ricky Van Shelton album), 1995
- Super Hits (Shenandoah album), 1994
- Super Hits, an album by Sherbet, 2006
- Super Hits (Toto album), 2001
- Super Hits, an album by Van Morrison, 1999
- Super Hits (The Verve Pipe album), 2007
- Super Hits, an album by Vince Gill, 1996
- Super Hits (Wild Cherry album), 2002
- Super Hits (Willie Nelson album), 1994
- Super Hits (Yanni album), 2007
- SuperHits 650 CISL, 2007 branding for CISL (AM)

== See also ==
- Super Hits, Volume 2, a greatest hits album by country music artist George Jones
