= Street X Street =

2025 single by Sia, Cypress Hill and DJ Flict

Single by Sia, Cypress Hill and DJ Flict
- Released: 25 July 2025
- Length: 2:54
- Label: Black Gold; Platoon
- Songwriters: Sia Furler; Louis Freese; Chris "Flict" Aparri
- Producer: DJ Flict

Sia singles chronology
"Perfect" (remix) (2025)	"Street X Street" (2025)	"Ranjha" (2026)

Cypress Hill singles chronology
"Hit 'Em" (2022)	"Street X Street" (2025)	"Wacha Trucha" (2026)

Music video
- "Street X Street" on YouTube

"Street X Street" is a song by Australian singer-songwriter Sia, American group Cypress Hill and American producer DJ Flict. It was released on 25 July 2025 by Black & Gold Records and Platoon. The song is the official anthem for Los Angeles FC.

== Personnel ==
- Sia – vocals, songwriting
- B-Real – vocals, songwriting
- Sen Dog – vocals
- DJ Flict – production, mixing engineering, executive production, songwriting
