= Los grandes éxitos en español =

Los Grandes Éxitos en Español

Greatest hits album by Cypress Hill
- Released: December 7, 1999
- Genres: Hip hop, gangsta rap
- Length: 47:24
- Labels: Ruffhouse; Columbia Records
- Producer: DJ Muggs

Cypress Hill chronology
IV (1998)	Los Grandes Éxitos en Español (1999)	Skull & Bones (2000)

Los Grandes Éxitos en Español (The Greatest Hits in Spanish) is the title of a 1999 release by Cypress Hill. It was certified Platinum by the RIAA.

== Album Information ==
With exception of the last track, which was previously unreleased, together with "Latin Lingo," and "Tres Equis" which appeared on Cypress Hill, the album features old songs with new Spanish lyrics.

The instrumental of the song 'Siempre Peligroso', would later be re-used in 'We Live This Shit', on Skull & Bones.

A limited edition CD version features an additional 'hidden' bonus track - "Latin Lingo" (Blackout Mix). An edited 'clean' version of this mix later appeared on the Stash EP.

== Reception ==
Professional ratings
Review scores
Source	Rating
AllMusic	2/5 stars
Kerrang!	3/5 stars
PopMatters	7/10 stars
RapReviews	8/10
Spin	8/10

- Spin (1/00, p. 127) - 8 out of 10 - "...recutting some of their best tracks in a nimble, L.A.-spawned 'espanol' that never sounds literal or clumsy..."
- Q magazine (8/00, p. 124) - 3 stars out of 5 - "Weird that not getting a single word makes them seem somehow more likeable."
- Alternative Press (1/00, p. 79) - 4 out of 5 - "...new takes on old favorites...put this album 'pista y hombros' above your everyday best-of comp."
- CMJ (12/27/99, p. 26) - "Hip-hop's stoned raiders reinterpret their most well known anthems in their native tongue on this exceptional Spanish-language greatest hits package....interesting new spins on old classics, while later cuts...benefit greatly from the creative switch..."
- Vibe (2/00, p. 167) - "...they satisfy the hunger [for a full-length album 'en espanol'] like a plateful of 'carne asada'....[It] not only breaks the language barriers but also further validates Cypress Hill's importance as a hip hop entity..."
- NME (5/27/00, p. 40) - 6 out of 10 - "It's as good as its many words....enough to send you loco en el coco."

== Track listing ==
No.	Title	Length
1.	"Yo Quiero Fumar (I Wanna Get High)"	2:46
2.	"Loco en el Coco (Insane in the Brain)"	3:23
3.	"No Entiendes la Onda (How I Could Just Kill a Man)"	4:09
4.	"Dr. Dedoverde (Dr. Greenthumb)"	2:58
5.	"Latino Lingo (Latin Lingo)"	4:00
6.	"Puercos (Pigs)"	2:46
7.	"Marijuano Locos (Stoned Raiders)"	2:58
8.	"Tú No Ajaunta (Checkmate)"	3:29
9.	"Ilusiones (Illusions)"	3:16
10.	"Muévete (Make a Move)"	4:02
11.	"No Pierdo Nada (Nothin' to Lose)" (featuring Mellow Man Ace)	3:52
12.	"Tequila (Tequila Sunrise)"	3:56
13.	"Tres Equis"	1:52
14.	"Siempre Peligroso" (featuring Fermin IV)	3:58

== Charts ==
Album - Billboard (North America)

Year	Chart	Position
1999	Top Latin Albums	6

== Sales and certifications ==
Region	Certification	Certified units/sales
United States (RIAA)	Platinum (Latin)	100,000^{^}
^{^} Shipments figures based on certification alone.
