= Smoke 'Em If You Got 'Em (Cypress Hill EP) =

EP by Cypress Hill
- Released: 2004
- Recorded: 2004
- Genre: Latin hip hop
- Length: 11:17
- Label: Columbia
- Producer: DJ Muggs

Cypress Hill chronology
| Stash (2002) | Smoke 'Em If You Got 'Em (2004) | Till Death Do Us Part (2004) |

Smoke Em If You Get Em is an EP from hip hop artist Cypress Hill. It was released in 2004 and includes one song from the Till Death Do Us Part album of that year. At 11:27 in length, it is the shortest release of any Cypress Hill project.

== Track listing ==
1. What's Your Number (3:51)
2. Insane in the Brain (3:23)
3. Hand on the Pump (4:03)
