= Trouble (Cypress Hill song) =

- cover for the double A-side single with "Lowrider"

Single by Cypress Hill

from the album Stoned Raiders
- B-side: "Lowrider"^{[A]}
- Released: November 23, 2001
- Genre: Nu metal; rap metal
- Length: 5:00 (album version); 4:24 (radio edit)
- Label: Columbia
- Songwriters: Eric Lance Correa, Louis Freese, Lawrence Muggerud, Christian Olde Wolbers, Senen Reyes
- Producer: DJ Muggs

Cypress Hill singles chronology
"Can't Get the Best of Me" (2000)	"Trouble" (2001)	"Lowrider" (2002)

Music video
- "Trouble" on YouTube

"Trouble" is the lead single from Cypress Hill's sixth studio album, Stoned Raiders. The song was the first part of the double A-Side single it shared with "Lowrider" in Europe. "Lowrider" was not released until February elsewhere.

== Music video ==
The song's music video begins with a shot of B-Real sitting in his car trying make a call on his cellphone. After his phone dies, he exits the vehicle to use a payphone. Having no change, B-Real places a $100 bill in a cup belonging to a person sleeping on the streets and takes a quarter out of the cup. He tries to make a call on the pay but discovers the phone line has been cut. As he turns around, he sees a group of hooded people start to form around him. B-Real's car then begins to drive. The previously sleeping person has left behind their money cup (and sign) suggesting they are the person driving away in B-Real's car. The hooded mob begin a foot chase and B-Real begins to run.

Meanwhile, Sen Dog is sitting at home drinking a beer on the couch. As he goes to the fridge to get another he hears a knock at the front door. After opening the door he sees a brawl in the front yard. Leaving the door open, he slowly walks out to his porch pausing for a beat before jumping into the brawl. His family exits the house to find that he is actually by himself, looking on in confusion.

The video returns to B-Real who is still running through the streets. He turns down an alley and his trapped. As the hooded mob finally catch up to him they remove their hoods and reveal that they are actually all different versions of B-Real himself.

Shots of the band performing the song are inter-cut with the video's story.

== Track listing ==
Trouble/Lowrider double a-side track listing:

No.	Title	Length
1.	"Trouble" (Radio Edit)	4:24
2.	"Lowrider" (Radio Edit)	4:36
3.	"Jack Your Back" (live)	3:33
4.	"(Rock) Superstar"	4:37
Total length:		17:10

== Charts ==
Chart (2001)	Peak position
CHE	70
GER	39
UK	33

== Personnel ==
- B-Real – Vocals
- Sen Dog – Vocals
- DJ Muggs – Mixing
- Eric Bobo – Drums
- Rogelio Lozano – Guitar
- Christian Olde Wolbers – Bass

== Notes ==
- A "Lowrider" and "Trouble" were released together as a double A-side single in several European territories.
