= Illusions (song) =

Single by Cypress Hill

from the album Cypress Hill III: Temples of Boom
- B-side: "Killafornia"
- Released: February 20, 1996
- Recorded: 1995
- Genre: Alternative hip hop
- Length: 4:28
- Label: Ruffhouse; Columbia
- Songwriters: Louis Freese; Lawrence Muggerud
- Producer: DJ Muggs

Cypress Hill singles chronology
"Throw Your Set in the Air" (1995)	"Illusions" (1996)	"Boom Biddy Bye Bye" (1996)

Music video
- "Illusions" on YouTube

Professional ratings
Review scores
Source	Rating
AllMusic	1.5/5 stars

"Illusions" is a song by American hip hop group Cypress Hill. It was written by members B-Real and DJ Muggs, and produced by the latter, who used a sample of Gary Burton's song "Las Vegas Tango". It was released in February 1996 via Ruffhouse/Columbia Records as the second single from the group's third studio album, III: Temples of Boom. An accompanying music video was directed by McG.

The song did not make it to the Billboard Hot 100 singles chart in the United States, however, it peaked at number 3 on the Bubbling Under Hot 100 singles chart, which acts as a 25-song extension to the Hot 100, number 87 on the Hot R&B/Hip-Hop Songs and number 31 on the Hot Rap Songs.

The song found better success in the United Kingdom, reaching number 23 on the UK singles chart, number 17 on the Official Dance Singles Chart and number 4 on the Official Hip Hop and R&B Singles Chart. It also peaked at number 33 in New Zealand.

Q-Tip's remix version of the song appeared in Cypress Hill's 1996 Unreleased and Revamped EP. The original song (retitled as "Ilusiones") was translated in Spanish for 1999 greatest hits album Los grandes éxitos en español.

According to James Masterton, the song marked a change in direction for Cypress Hill, "being more laid back than anything they have ever released before, so much so that it is almost ambient in tone".

== Track listing ==
US 12"
No.	Title	Length
1.	"Illusions" (LP Version Radio Edit)
2.	"Illusions" (LP Version Instrumental)
3.	"Illusions" (Q-Tip Remix Radio Edit)
4.	"Illusions" (Q-Tip Remix Instrumental)
5.	"Illusions" (Muggs Remix Radio Edit)
6.	"Illusions" (Muggs Remix Instrumental)
7.	"Killafornia" (LP Version)
8.	"Killafornia" (LP Version Instrumental)

== Charts ==
Chart (1996)	Peak position
New Zealand (Recorded Music NZ)	33
UK Singles (Official Charts)	23
UK Dance (Official Charts)	17
UK Hip Hop/R&B (Official Charts)	4
US Bubbling Under Hot 100 (Billboard)	3
US Hot R&B/Hip-Hop Songs (Billboard)	87
US Hot Rap Songs (Billboard)	31
