= Lowrider (Cypress Hill song) =

- Cover for the American single

Single by Cypress Hill

from the album Stoned Raiders
- B-side: "Trouble"^{[A]}
- Released: February 26, 2002 (UK: November 26, 2001)
- Genre: West Coast hip hop
- Length: 6:41 (album version); 4:36 (radio edit)
- Label: Columbia
- Songwriters: Louis Freese, Lawrence Muggerud, Senen Reyes, Ulpiano Sergio Reyes
- Producer: DJ Muggs

Cypress Hill singles chronology
| "Trouble" (2001) | "Lowrider" (2002) | "What's Your Number?" (2004) |

Music video
- "Lowrider" on YouTube

"Lowrider" is a single by the American hip hop group Cypress Hill, the second single from the album Stoned Raiders. The song is featured in the British TV series Soccer AM. The song was the second part of the double A-Side single it shared with "Trouble" in Europe. "Lowrider" was not released until February elsewhere.

On the album, there is a hidden track. The hidden track is rather ominous as it features a slow drum beat and a low pitched organ that only plays five notes. This lasts for around two minutes.

== Track listing ==
American single
| No. | Title | Length |
|---|---|---|
| 1. | "Lowrider" (radio edit) | 4:37 |
| 2. | "Lowrider" (instrumental) | 4:37 |
| 3. | "Psychodelic Vision" | 4:27 |
| 4. | "(Rock) Superstar" (live) | 6:09 |
| 5. | "(Rap) Superstar" (Alchemist remix) | 4:50 |

== Charts ==
Weekly chart performance for "Trouble" / "Lowrider" by Cypress Hill
| Chart (2002) | Peak position |
|---|---|
| Austria (Ö3 Austria Top 40) | 59 |
| Germany (Media Control Charts) | 39 |
| Switzerland (Schweizer Hitparade) | 70 |
| UK Singles (OCC) | 33 |
| US Hot R&B/Hip-Hop Singles Sales (Billboard) | 48 |

2002 year-end chart performance for "Lowrider" by Cypress Hill
| Chart (2002) | Position |
|---|---|
| Canada (Nielsen SoundScan) | 195 |

== Personnel ==
- B-Real - Vocals
- Sen Dog - Vocals
- DJ Muggs - Arranger, Producer, Mixing

== Notes ==
- A "Lowrider" and "Trouble" were released together as a double A-side single in several European territories.
- B "Lowrider" did not enter the Hot R&B/Hip-Hop Songs chart, but peaked at number 8 on the Bubbling Under R&B/Hip-Hop Singles chart, which acts as a 25-song extension to the R&B/Hip-Hop Songs chart.
