= Elephants on Acid =

Studio album by Cypress Hill
- Released: September 28, 2018
- Genres: Alternative hip-hop; hardcore hip-hop; experimental hip-hop
- Length: 51:47
- Label: BMG
- Producer: DJ Muggs

Cypress Hill chronology
Cypress X Rusko (2012)	Elephants on Acid (2018)	Back in Black (2022)

Singles from Elephants on Acid
- 1. "Band of Gypsies" Released: August 3, 2018; 2. "Muggs is Dead" Released: August 23, 2018; 3. "Crazy" Released: September 14, 2018; 4. "Locos" Released: September 23, 2018

Elephants on Acid is the ninth studio album by American hip hop group Cypress Hill, and is the group's first studio album in eight years following Rise Up, making it the group's longest gap between albums. The album was released on September 28, 2018. The album includes 21 tracks. Unlike Rise Up, the group's last album, which was produced by a number of people, this album is fully produced by DJ Muggs.

Despite serving as an interlude, "Muggs Is Dead" was released as a second single of the album on August 23 and received an animated video created by Felix Colgrave.

== Reception ==
Professional ratings
Aggregate scores
Source	Rating
Metacritic	75/100
Review scores
Source	Rating
The 405	7/10
AllMusic	3.5/5 stars
The Guardian	4/5 stars
The Independent	4/5 stars
Mojo	5/5 stars
MusicOMH	3/5 stars
NME	2/5 stars
The Observer	4/5 stars
Q	4/5 stars

According to the review aggregator Metacritic, Elephants on Acid received "generally favorable reviews" based on a weighted average score of 75 out of 100 from 11 critic scores.

The Independent said about the album, "On their first album in eight years, Cypress Hill still sound like no one else."

AllMusic reviewer Fred Thomas said that "Thirty years into any music career, the pressure is generally off. Cypress Hill, active since 1988 and best known for their weed-friendly gangsta rap hits from the '90s, could easily rewrite and revisit the ideas that made them famous for the rest of their days and fans would delight in the familiarity."

The Guardian said of the album "Most episodes of the superb HBO sitcom Silicon Valley end with a musical outro: usually banging hip-hop. This album by Cypress Hill should make the music supervisors’ job on season six a doddle."

== Track listing ==
All tracks are written by Cypress Hill.

No.	Title	Producer	Length
1.	"Tusko" (Intro)	DJ Muggs	0:48
2.	"Band of Gypsies" (featuring Sadat and Alaa Fifty)	DJ Muggs	3:49
3.	"Put Em in the Ground"	DJ Muggs	2:21
4.	"Satao" (Interval)	DJ Muggs	0:29
5.	"Jesus Was a Stoner"	DJ Muggs	3:25
6.	"Pass the Knife"	DJ Muggs	3:36
7.	"LSD" (Interval)	DJ Muggs	0:37
8.	"Oh Na Na" (featuring Brevi)	DJ Muggs	2:57
9.	"Holy Mountain" (Interval)	DJ Muggs	1:15
10.	"Locos" (featuring Sick Jacken)	DJ Muggs	3:18
11.	"Falling Down"	DJ Muggs	2:19
12.	"Elephant Acid" (Interlude)	DJ Muggs	0:52
13.	"Insane OG"	DJ Muggs	1:23
14.	"The 5th Angel" (Instrumental)	DJ Muggs	2:01
15.	"Warlord"	DJ Muggs	3:17
16.	"Reefer Man" (featuring Brevi)	DJ Muggs	3:22
17.	"Thru the Rabbit Hole" (Interlude)	DJ Muggs	1:54
18.	"Crazy" (featuring Brevi)	DJ Muggs	2:52
19.	"Muggs Is Dead" (Interlude)	DJ Muggs	2:11
20.	"Blood on My Hands Again"	DJ Muggs	3:20
21.	"Stairway to Heaven" (featuring Brevi)	DJ Muggs	5:41
Total length:			51:47

== Personnel ==
Cypress Hill

- Louis "B-Real" Freese – lead vocals
- Senen "Sen Dog" Reyes – co-lead vocals
- Lawrence "DJ Muggs" Muggerud – turntables, samples, producer
- Eric "Bobo" Correa – drums, percussion

Additional

- Kory B. Garnett – vocals (tracks: 8, 16, 18, 21)
- Alaa Fifty – vocals (track 2)
- Sadat – vocals (track 2)
- Sumach Ecks – vocals (track 5)
- Joaquin "Sick Jacken" Gonzalez – vocals (track 10)
- Fredwreck – keyboards, guitars, mixing
- Terrace Martin – alto saxophone
- Adam Turchin – baritone and tenor saxophone
- Josef Leimberg – trumpet, valve trombone

Production

- Dave Kutch – mastering
- Ramon Cho – artwork
- Felipe Romero – artwork
- Darren Vargas – artwork
- Deb Klein – management

== Charts ==
Chart (2018)	Peak position
Austrian Albums (Ö3 Austria)	16
Belgian Albums (Ultratop Flanders)	55
Belgian Albums (Ultratop Wallonia)	71
Czech Albums (ČNS IFPI)	44
Dutch Albums (Album Top 100)	57
German Albums (Offizielle Top 100)	27
Scottish Albums (Official Charts)	33
Spanish Albums (PROMUSICAE)	77
Swiss Albums (Schweizer Hitparade)	9
UK Albums (Official Charts)	64
US Billboard 200	120

== Release history ==
Country	Date	Format	Label	Catalogue
Australia	September 28, 2018	CD, digital download	BMG	1413278413
