= Boom Biddy Bye Bye =

Single by Cypress Hill

from the album Cypress Hill III: Temples of Boom
- Released: May 21, 1996
- Recorded: 1995
- Genre: Alternative hip hop
- Length: 4:04
- Label: Ruffhouse; Columbia
- Songwriters: Louis Freese; Senen Reyes; Lawrence Muggerud
- Producer: DJ Muggs

Cypress Hill singles chronology
"Illusions" (1995)	"Boom Biddy Bye Bye" (1996)	"Ice Cube Killa" (1996)

Music video
- "Boom Biddy Bye Bye" on YouTube

"Boom Biddy Bye Bye" is a song written and performed by American hip hop group Cypress Hill. It was released on May 21, 1996 via Ruffhouse/Columbia Records as the third and final single from the group's third studio album III: Temples of Boom. An official remix and music video featuring Fugees were released later that year, and was also included on their 1996 EP Unreleased & Revamped.

The song peaked at number 87 on the Billboard Hot 100, number 73 on the Hot R&B/Hip-Hop Songs and number 19 on the Hot Rap Songs in the United States.

== Reception ==
Professional ratings
Review scores
Source	Rating
AllMusic	1.5/5 stars

== Track listing ==
No.	Title	Length
1.	"Boom Biddy Bye Bye" (Fugees Remix Radio Edit)	3:33
2.	"Boom Biddy Bye Bye" (King Tech Remix Radio Edit)	4:13
3.	"Boom Biddy Bye Bye" (Fugees Remix Instrumental)	3:34
4.	"Boom Biddy Bye Bye" (LP Version Radio Edit)	4:00
5.	"Boom Biddy Bye Bye" (LP Version)	4:00
6.	"Boom Biddy Bye Bye" (LP Version Instrumental)	4:00

== Charts ==
Charts (1996)	Peak position
US Billboard Hot 100	87
US Hot R&B/Hip-Hop Songs (Billboard)	73
US Hot Rap Songs (Billboard)	19
