= Back in Black (Cypress Hill album) =

Studio album by Cypress Hill
- Released: March 18, 2022
- Length: 32:29
- Labels: RuffNation; MNRK
- Producer: Black Milk

Cypress Hill chronology
Elephants on Acid (2018)	Back in Black (2022)	Dios Bendiga (2026)

Singles from Back in Black
- 1. "Bye Bye" Released: January 21, 2022

Back in Black is the tenth studio album by American hip hop group Cypress Hill. It was released on March 18, 2022.

The album includes 10 tracks. Unlike Elephants on Acid (2018), the group's previous album, which was produced by DJ Muggs, this album was solely produced by Black Milk.

== Reception ==
Professional ratings
Aggregate scores
Source	Rating
Metacritic	76/100
Review scores
Source	Rating
The A.V. Club	B
The Arts Desk	2/5 stars
Clash	7/10
Gigwise	9/10 stars
The Independent	4/5 stars
HipHopDX	3.5/5
Kerrang!	4/5
MusicOMH	3.5/5 stars
RapReviews	6/10
Sputnikmusic	3.4/5

According to the review aggregator Metacritic, Back in Black received "generally favorable reviews" based on a weighted average score of 76 out of 100 from 11 critic scores.

== Track listing ==
No.	Title	Writer(s)	Length
1.	"Takeover"	Louis Freese; Senen Reyes; Demerick Ferm; Curtis Cross II; Itsuroh Shimoda; Yutaka Higashi	3:15
2.	"Open Ya Mind"	Freese; Reyes; Ferm; Cross	3:44
3.	"Certified" (featuring Demrick)	Freese; Reyes; Ferm; Cross	3:09
4.	"Bye Bye" (featuring Dizzy Wright)	Freese; Reyes; Ferm; Cross	3:48
5.	"Come with Me"	Reyes; Ferm; Cross	3:15
6.	"The Original"	Reyes; Ferm; Cross	2:54
7.	"Hit Em'"	Freese; Reyes; Cross	2:19
8.	"Break of Dawn"	Freese; Reyes; Ferm; Cross	2:54
9.	"Champion Sound"	Freese; Reyes; Ferm; Cross	3:03
10.	"The Ride"	Freese; Cross	4:04

== Personnel ==
Cypress Hill

- B-Real – vocals (all tracks), engineering (track 2)
- Sen Dog – vocals (all tracks), engineering (2)
- Eric Bobo – drums, percussion

Additional personnel

- Black Milk – production, mixing
- Drew Drucker – mastering, engineering (1, 3–10)
- Aaron Diaz – engineering (1, 3–10), vocal engineering (all tracks)
- Dominic Thiroux – engineering (1, 3–10), vocal engineering (all tracks)
- Raphael Lamotta – creative direction
- Dana Diaz-Tutaan – layout design

== Charts ==
Chart performance for Back in Black
Chart (2022)	Peak position
Austrian Albums (Ö3 Austria)	56
Belgian Albums (Ultratop Flanders)	195
Belgian Albums (Ultratop Wallonia)	128
French Albums (SNEP)	123
German Albums (Offizielle Top 100)	17
Scottish Albums (Official Charts)	53
Swiss Albums (Schweizer Hitparade)	12
US Top Current Album Sales (Billboard)	69
