= Stash (EP) =

EP by Cypress Hill
- Released: July 2, 2002
- Recorded: 1995–2002
- Genre: Hip-hop
- Length: 23:21
- Label: Ruffhouse; Columbia
- Producer: DJ Muggs; The Alchemist; Fredwreck

Cypress Hill chronology
Stoned Raiders (2001)	Stash (2002)	Till Death Do Us Part (2004)

Professional ratings
Review scores
Source	Rating
AllMusic	2.5/5 stars
RapReviews	4/10

Stash is an EP released by Cypress Hill in 2002 and includes various, and mainly previously released remixes of their songs. The EP was heavily criticized for being censored for profanity (see Notes).

== Track listing ==
Stash
No.	Title	Length
1.	"Amplified" (Fredwreck Remix)	3:44
2.	"Illusions" (Harpsichord Mix)	3:32
3.	"Checkmate" (Hang 'Em High Remix Radio Edit featuring Tom Morello)	4:03
4.	"Latin Lingo" (Blackout Mix)	3:49
5.	"(Rap) Superstar" (Alchemist Remix)	4:51
6.	"Throw Your Set in the Air" (Slow Roll Remix)	3:23

== Notes ==
All remixes are 'clean' versions with the exception of "Throw Your Set In The Air".

- "Amplified" (Fredwreck Remix) is exclusive to Stash.
- The unedited "Illusions" (Harpsichord Mix) was previously released on the Illusions CD single with the name Illusions (Muggs Remix).
- The unedited "Checkmate" (Hang 'Em High Remix) was previously released on the (Rock) Superstar CD single.
- The unedited "Latin Lingo" (Blackout Mix) was previously released as a hidden bonus track on the limited edition CD version of Los grandes éxitos en español.
- The unedited "(Rap) Superstar" (Alchemist Remix) was previously released on the Highlife / Can't Get the Best of Me CD single.
- "Throw Your Set in the Air" (Slow Roll Remix) was previously released on the Throw Your Set in the Air CD single.
