= Throw Your Set in the Air =

Single by Cypress Hill

from the album Cypress Hill III: Temples of Boom
- Released: September 26, 1995
- Genre: West Coast hip hop
- Length: 4:08 (album version); 3:25 (edit)
- Label: Ruffhouse; Columbia; SME
- Songwriters: B-Real; DJ Muggs
- Producer: DJ Muggs

Cypress Hill singles chronology
"Lick a Shot" (1994)	"Throw Your Set in the Air" (1995)	"Illusions" (1996)

Music video
- "Throw Your Set in the Air" on YouTube

Professional ratings
Review scores
Source	Rating
AllMusic	3/5 stars

"Throw Your Set in the Air" is a song by American hip hop group Cypress Hill, released in September 1995, by Ruffhouse, Columbia and SME, as the lead single from their third album, Cypress Hill III: Temples of Boom (1995). The song was written by group members B-Real and DJ Muggs, and produced by Muggs. Its accompanying music video, directed by McG, has a sepia tone and features the group performing in various places along with images of Buddha. Along with "Insane in the Brain", "Throw Your Set in the Air" is used in The Simpsons episode "Homerpalooza".

== Feud with Ice Cube ==
According to B-Real and DJ Muggs, the rapper Ice Cube stole the hook of his song "Friday", the theme song of the 1995 comedy film Friday, from "Throw Your Set in the Air". This ignited a feud between Cypress Hill and Ice Cube's supergroup Westside Connection, which resulted in three diss tracks: "No Rest for the Wicked" on Cypress Hill III: Temples of Boom (by Cypress Hill), "King of the Hill" on Bow Down (by Westside Connection) and "Ice Cube Killa" (non-album single by Cypress Hill).

== Critical reception ==
James Masterton for Dotmusic said the new single "represents no progression on their previous work, but to its credit it is one of the more accessible rap records around at present." Pan-European magazine Music & Media commented, "Advise your listeners to follow the instructions given by the Hispanic rappers in this song title. The bang of the exploding radio will be less weird than the noises featured on the record." A reviewer from Music Week rated it three out of five, adding that "the godfathers of stoned rap return with a laid-back offering that will please fans." David Quantick from NME wrote, "This record is the usual with a nice sample and some dull aggressive talking."

== Track listing ==
Club Remix

No.	Title	Length
1.	"Throw Your Set in the Air" (Album Version)	3:25
2.	"Throw Your Set in the Air" (Club Remix)	3:12
3.	"Killa Hill"	3:26
4.	"Throw Your Set in the Air" (Instrumental)	2:52
5.	"Throw Your Set in the Air" (Slow Roll Remix)	3:23
6.	"Killa Hill" (instrumental)	3:26
7.	"Throw Your Set in the Air" (Club Remix Instrumental)	3:12
8.	"Throw Your Set in the Air" (Slow Roll Remix Instrumental)	3:24

== Charts ==
Chart (1995)	Peak position
Australia (ARIA)	29
Finland (Suomen virallinen lista)	11
Germany (Media Control Charts)	83
Ireland (IRMA)	19
New Zealand (RIANZ)	7
Scotland (OCC)	13
Sweden (Sverigetopplistan)	13
UK Singles (OCC)	15
US Billboard Hot 100	45
US Hot R&B/Hip-Hop Songs (Billboard)	60
US Hot Rap Songs (Billboard)	11
US Maxi-Singles Sales (Billboard)	6
US Cash Box Top 100	45
