= Lick a Shot =

1994 single by Cypress Hill

Single by Cypress Hill

from the album Black Sunday
- B-side: "Scooby Doo"
- Released: 1994
- Genre: Hardcore hip hop
- Length: 3:23
- Label: Ruffhouse; Columbia
- Songwriters: Louis Freese; Lawrence Muggerud
- Producer: DJ Muggs

Cypress Hill singles chronology
"I Ain't Goin' Out Like That" (1993)	"Lick a Shot" (1994)	"Throw Your Set in the Air" (1995)

"Lick a Shot" is a UK exclusive single by American hip hop group Cypress Hill, released in 1994 by Ruffhouse and Columbia Records. The song originally appeared on the group's second album, Black Sunday (1993) and reached number 20 on the UK Singles Chart. It was written by group members Louis Freese and Lawrence Muggerud and produced by the latter. "Lick a Shot" was interpolated at the end of the Korn song "Blind".

== Critical reception ==
Upon the release, pan-European magazine Music & Media commented, "Watch out, Los Hermanos are aiming their verbal machine guns at your heads again. Still not insane from these "gangstas" on spliff?" James Hamilton from the Record Mirror Dance Update described it as a "rasping gruff unison rap chanter" in his weekly dance column. Gareth Grundy from Select wrote that it "wouldn't offend anyone, though, DJ Muggs' beats might be the most distinctive and imaginative in the field, but like most of the band's Black Sunday album, this is a fairly whitey-friendly version of gangsta rap." Another Select editor, Adam Higginbotham, noted that "fat, acoustic sounds predominate" on tracks like 'Lick a Shot'.

== Track listing ==
No.	Title	Length
1.	"Lick a Shot" (Album Version)	3:23
2.	"Lick a Shot" (Clean Version)	3:23
3.	"Lick a Shot" (instrumental hook)	3:23
4.	"Lick a Shot" (instrumental)	3:23
5.	"Lick a Shot" (vocal UD version)	3:30
6.	"Scooby Doo"	3:39

== Charts ==
Chart (1994)	Peak position
UK Singles (OCC)	20
UK Dance (Music Week)	9
UK Club Chart (Music Week)	85
