= Stoned Raiders =

2001 album by Cypress Hill

Studio album by Cypress Hill
- Released: December 4, 2001
- Recorded: 2001
- Genre: Hip-hop; hardcore hip-hop; rap metal; nu metal
- Length: 58:28
- Label: Columbia
- Producer: DJ Muggs

Cypress Hill chronology
Live at the Fillmore (2000)	Stoned Raiders (2001)	Stash (2002)

Singles from Stoned Raiders
- 1. "Trouble" Released: November 23, 2001; 2. "Lowrider" Released: February 26, 2002

Stoned Raiders is the sixth studio album by American hip-hop group Cypress Hill, released on December 4, 2001, by Columbia Records.

== Background ==
This album is best known for its two singles: "Trouble" and "Lowrider". The song "Kronologik" also summarizes Cypress Hill's career from their debut in 1991 until the album was released. Many of its songs feature guest artists like MC Ren, King Tee, Redman and Method Man.

"Here Is Something You Can't Understand", is a sequel of their breakthrough single, "How I Could Just Kill a Man". "Lowrider" was performed by the group in the film "How High" starring Method Man & Redman, and is also used on the British TV Series Soccer AM.

The album title was taken from the song of the same name from the group's third album Cypress Hill III: Temples of Boom, released in 1995.

== Critical reception ==
Professional ratings
Review scores
Source	Rating
AllMusic	3/5 stars
BBC Manchester	7/10
The Guardian	2/5 stars
Los Angeles Times	2.5/4 stars
Mixmag	3/5
RapReviews	8.5/10
The Source	3/5 stars
Vibe	3.5/5 stars

Stoned Raiders received mostly positive reviews from music critics. A reviewer for Mixmag wrote that Cypress Hill "seem to be searching for new sounds and styles and this explains the multi-personality nature of the album way better than the ubiquitous chronic". Shawn Edwards of Vibe called it the group's best album "in years", commending DJ Muggs for "melding his beats with fizzy guitar licks, frenzied percussion work, and string orchestration". Bradley Torreano of AllMusic called it a "good album despite its varying quality". Comparing Stoned Raiders to the group's previous album Skull & Bones, Steve Juon of RapReviews said that it "doesn't completely abandon the new stylee but brings back a rawer latin sound". Jon Caramanica, in his review for The Source, wrote that the group's "heavy reliance on guitars throughout the album begins to undermine their hip-hop swagger", and while they are "equally proficient" in both hip-hop and rock, "bouncing between the two worlds has left them unable to claim proper membership in either". Simon Price of The Independent disagreed, as he believed that Cypress Hill's combination of hip-hop and rock was "remarkably successful" and that it was taken "to a new level" on Stoned Raiders, which he described as a "schizoid affair". Mark Weingarten of Los Angeles Times thought Cypress Hill "stick to a conservative game plan", which turns into "desultory posturing" on some of the tracks. He commended Sen Dog and B-Real, whose performances "transform tired rants into something genial and ebullient".

Kludge listed Stoned Raiders as one of the 25 best albums of 2001.

== Track listing ==
All tracks produced by DJ Muggs

No.	Title	Writer(s)	Length
1.	"Intro"	Lawrence Muggerud	1:03
2.	"Trouble"	Louis Freese; Muggerud; Senen Reyes; Christian Olde Wolbers; Eric Correa	5:00
3.	"Kronologik" (featuring Kurupt)	Muggerud; Freese; S. Reyes; Ricardo Brown	4:45
4.	"Southland Killers" (featuring MC Ren and King Tee)	Muggerud; Freese; S. Reyes; Lorenzo Patterson; Roger McBridge	3:25
5.	"Bitter"	Muggerud; Freese	4:20
6.	"Amplified"	Freese; Mugggerud; S. Reyes; Andy Zambrano; Jeremy Fleener; Correa	3:54
7.	"It Ain't Easy"	Muggerud; Freese; S. Reyes	4:13
8.	"Memories"	Muggerud; Freese	4:09
9.	"Psychodelic Vision"	Muggerud; Freese	4:27
10.	"Red, Meth & B" (featuring Redman & Method Man)	Muggerud; Freese; Reggie Noble; Clifford Smith	3:45
11.	"Lowrider"	Muggerud; Freese; S. Reyes; Ulpiano Reyes	6:41
12.	"Catastrophe"	Muggerud; Freese; S. Reyes; Olde Wolbers; Correa	3:25
13.	"L.I.F.E." (featuring Kokane)	Muggerud; Freese; S. Reyes; Jerry Long	4:43
14.	"Here Is Something You Can't Understand" (featuring Kurupt)	Muggerud; Freese; S. Reyes; Brown	4:30
15.	"Weed Man" (special edition bonus track)		3:14

== Personnel ==
Cypress Hill

- B-Real – vocals
- Sen Dog – vocals
- DJ Muggs – producer, arranger, mixing
- Eric Bobo – drums (2, 6, 7, 12)

Additional personnel

- Jeremy Fleener – guitar (6)
- Paula Gallithno – string orchestration (7)
- Brian Gardner – mastering
- Sonny Gerasimowicz – design
- Rogelio Lozano – guitar (7, 12)
- Scott Abels - drums (1, 5)
- Tracy McNew – project coordinator
- Jessy Moss – additional vocals (5)
- Estavan Oriol – design, photography
- Mike Sims – guitar (5, 7), Moog synthesizer (6)
- Troy Staton – engineer
- Christian Olde Wolbers – bass guitar (2, 12), guitar (2)
- Andy Zambrano – guitar (6)

== Charts ==
=== Weekly charts ===
Weekly chart performance for Stoned Raiders
Chart (2001–02)	Peak position
Austrian Albums (Ö3 Austria)	24
Belgian Albums (Ultratop Flanders)	38
Dutch Albums (Album Top 100)	75
French Albums (SNEP)	54
German Albums (Offizielle Top 100)	26
Swiss Albums (Schweizer Hitparade)	19

=== Year-end charts ===
Year-end chart performance for Stoned Raiders
Chart (2002)	Position
Canadian Alternative Albums (Nielsen SoundScan)	153
Canadian Metal Albums (Nielsen SoundScan)	77
Canadian R&B Albums (Nielsen SoundScan)	93
Canadian Rap Albums (Nielsen SoundScan)	50

== Certifications ==
Region	Certification	Certified units/sales
United Kingdom (BPI)	Silver	60,000^{*}
^{*} Sales figures based on certification alone.
