= Cypress Hill IV =

Studio album by Cypress Hill
- Released: October 6, 1998
- Recorded: 1997–1998
- Genre: West Coast hip-hop; Latin hip-hop; hip-hop; hardcore hip-hop
- Length: 73:17
- Label: Ruffhouse; Columbia
- Producer: DJ Muggs

Cypress Hill chronology
| Cypress Hill III: Temples of Boom (1995) | Cypress Hill IV (1998) | Skull & Bones (2000) |

Singles from IV
- 1. "Dr. Greenthumb" Released: September 1998; 2. "Tequila Sunrise" Released: 1998; 3. "Audio X" Released: 1998

Cypress Hill IV is the fourth studio album by American hip-hop group Cypress Hill. It was released on October 6, 1998, by Ruffhouse and Columbia Records. The skeletons on the cover are posing as the three wise monkeys (see no evil, hear no evil, speak no evil). Rappers MC Eiht and Barron Ricks were featured on the album. The album went Gold in the U.S with over 500,000 units sold.

"16 Men Till There's No Men Left", "Checkmate", and "Lightning Strikes" are featured in the 1999 PC game Kingpin: Life of Crime. Alongside the full versions of these tracks, instrumental versions with the vocals removed were used as backing tracks. Cypress Hill also provided some of the voice acting for the game.

== Reception ==
Professional ratings
Review scores
| Source | Rating |
|---|---|
| AllMusic | 1.5/5 stars |
| The Encyclopedia of Popular Music | 3/5 stars |
| Entertainment Weekly | C+ |
| Los Angeles Times | 3.5/4 stars |
| NME | 7/10 |
| Pitchfork | 3.3/10 |
| RapReviews | 7.5/10 |
| The Rolling Stone Album Guide | 1/5 stars |
| The Source | 3/5 stars |

IV received mixed reviews from critics, with AllMusic giving it a strongly negative review.

Rolling Stone - 3.5 Stars (out of 5) - "Cypress Hill's most bangin' LP since their 1991 debut.… Cypress Hill still name-check firearms, threaten rivals and smoke more weed than a congregation of Rastas. But the obsessions are means to an end."

The Wire - "…they come out fighting. Red eyed, rabid and slobbering with skunk-fueled menace.… gangsta rap's future as a musical force is secure."

Rap Pages - 4 (out of 5) - "Like previous albums…IV's fabulous formula of speakerphone tones by B-Real and sporadic comments by Sen Dog resembles 'How I Could Just Kill A Man'."

== Track listing ==
- All tracks produced by DJ Muggs

Cypress Hill IV
| No. | Title | Writer(s) | Length |
|---|---|---|---|
| 1. | "Looking Through the Eye of a Pig" | Lawrence Muggerud; Louis Freese | 4:06 |
| 2. | "Checkmate" | Muggerud; Freese; Senen Reyes | 3:35 |
| 3. | "From the Window of My Room" | Muggerud; Freese; Reyes | 5:00 |
| 4. | "Prelude to a Come Up" (feat. MC Eiht) | Muggerud; Freese; MC Eiht; Albert Johnson; Kejuan Muchita; Nathaniel Wilson; Frank Malave; Jamal Grinnage; Chris Karrer; Peter Leopold; Stefan Zauner | 3:24 |
| 5. | "Riot Starter" | Muggerud; Freese; Reyes | 4:17 |
| 6. | "Audio X" (feat. Barron Ricks) | Muggerud; Freese; Barron Ricks | 3:19 |
| 7. | "Steel Magnolia" (feat. Barron Ricks) | Muggerud; Freese; Ricks | 3:30 |
| 8. | "I Remember That Freak Bitch (From the Club) / Interlude Part 2" | Muggerud; Freese; Ricks | 5:22 |
| 9. | "(Goin' All Out) Nothin' to Lose" | Muggerud; Freese; Reyes | 3:53 |
| 10. | "Tequila Sunrise" (feat. Barron Ricks) | Muggerud; Freese; Ricks | 4:44 |
| 11. | "Dead Men Tell No Tales" | Muggerud; Freese | 2:47 |
| 12. | "Feature Presentation" (feat. Barron Ricks and Chace Infinite) | Muggerud; Freese; Ricks; Chace Infinite | 3:45 |
| 13. | "Dr. Greenthumb" | Muggerud; Freese | 4:24 |
| 14. | "16 Men Till There's No Men Left" | Muggerud; Freese | 4:20 |
| 15. | "High Times" | Muggerud; Freese; Richard Fritz | 4:13 |
| 16. | "Clash of the Titans / Dust" | Muggerud; Freese | 4:45 |
| 17. | "Lightning Strikes" | Muggerud; Freese; Reyes | 5:54 |
| 18. | "Case Closed" | Muggerud; Freese | 2:00 |

== Bonus tracks ==
Rags to Riches is included as a bonus track on some editions of the album, which is actually a Baron Ricks song, credited to Baron Ricks featuring Cypress Hill & Self Scientific. It was separately released on his 12-inch vinyl single Rags to Riches / Harlem River Drive.

== Personnel ==
- B-Real - vocals
- Sen Dog - vocals
- DJ Muggs - arranger, producer, mixing
- Eric "Bobo" Correa - bass, percussion, backing vocals
- MC Eiht - vocals
- Chace Infinite (of Self Scientific) - vocals
- Barron Ricks - vocals
- Mike Sims - Bass, Guitar
- Troy Stanton - engineer
- Reggie Stewart - bass
- Sean Evans - art direction
- Dean Karr - photography
- Manuel Lecuona - mastering

== Charts ==
| Year | Chart | Peak position |
|---|---|---|
| 1998 | Billboard Canadian Albums | 3 |
| 1998 | Dutch Albums (Album Top 100) | 17 |
| 1998 | French Albums Top 100 | 7 |
| 1998 | German Albums (Offizielle Top 100) | 17 |
| 1998 | Swiss Albums (Schweizer Hitparade) | 14 |
| 1998 | The Billboard 200 | 11 |
| 1998 | Top R&B/Hip-Hop Albums | 11 |
| 1998 | UK Official Albums Chart Top 100 | 25 |

== Certifications ==
| Region | Certification | Certified units/sales |
|---|---|---|
| Canada (Music Canada) | Gold | 50,000^{^} |
| France (SNEP) | Gold | 100,000^{*} |
| United Kingdom (BPI) | Gold | 100,000^{^} |
| United States (RIAA) | Gold | 500,000^{^} |
^{*} Sales figures based on certification alone.^{^} Shipments figures based on certification alone.
