= Dr. Greenthumb =

Single by Cypress Hill

from the album IV
- B-side: "Can You Handle This?"
- Released: 1998
- Studio: Ameraycan Studios (North Hollywood, CA)
- Genre: Hip hop
- Length: 4:24
- Label: Ruffhouse; Columbia
- Songwriter(s): Louis Freese; Lawrence Muggerud
- Producer(s): DJ Muggs

Cypress Hill singles chronology
"Tequila Sunrise" (1998)	"Dr. Greenthumb" (1998)	"No Entiendes la Onda" (1999)

Music video
- "Dr. Greenthumb" on YouTube

"Dr. Greenthumb" is a song by American hip hop group Cypress Hill. It was released in 1998 through Ruffhouse/Columbia Records as the second single off of the group's fourth studio album IV. Recording sessions took place at Ameraycan Studios in North Hollywood. Written by members B-Real and DJ Muggs, it was produced by the latter. The Spanish version of the song retitled as "Dr. Dedoverde" appeared in Los grandes éxitos en español. A music video for the song was directed by Estevan Oriol.

Domestically, the song peaked at number 70 on the Billboard Hot 100, number 57 on the Hot R&B/Hip-Hop Songs and number 14 on the Hot Rap Songs. In the United Kingdom, the single reached number 34 on the UK Singles Chart, number 7 on the UK Dance Singles Chart and number 9 on the UK Hip Hop and R&B Singles Chart. It also made it to number 47 in Germany.

== Plot ==
In the song B-Real introduces his alter-ego Dr. Greenthumb, a cannabis grower, telling the story from his perspective. It begins with a comical skit starring the titular salesman who speaks in an unusually high voice. He introduces the listener to his program where he will demonstrate how to grow the best marijuana whilst also providing canopies called "Sizzlean screens", which prevent the police force from looking down at their marijuana farms from their helicopters. A farmer named Jed is one of his clients and he explains how Dr. Greenthumb saved his life as he was harassed by the cops because of his marijuana farm. Dr. Greenthumb persuades the listener to call him all while smoking some of his own cannabis and hacking and coughing. The actual song begins at 1:15, although it is edited on certain releases which makes the song start at 0:59.

The name Dr. Greenthumb dates back to the 1970s cartoon Josie and the Pussycats, where the name referred to a villain who ruled "creature plants". It is unclear if this title was lifted by Cypress Hill.

The name "Dr. Greenthumb" was later used in "Tell Me When to Go" by E-40. The song's backing rhythm is sampled from the first few seconds of "The Good, the Bad and the Ugly" cover by The 50 Guitars of Tommy Garrett, which is repeated throughout the duration of the song.

== Track listing ==
No.	Title	Producer(s)	Length
1.	"Dr. Greenthumb" (Radio Edit)	DJ Muggs	3:08
2.	"Dr. Greenthumb" (Instrumental)	DJ Muggs	3:00
3.	"Can You Handle This"	DJ Muggs	3:57
4.	"Dr. Greenthumb" (Fun Lovin' Criminals Remix)	DJ Muggs; Fun Lovin' Criminals (add.); I.S.P. (add.)	3:53

== Personnel ==
- Louis "B-Real" Freese – songwriter, vocals
- Senen "Sen Dog" Reyes – backing vocals
- Lawrence "DJ Muggs" Muggerud – songwriter, producer, arranger, mixing
- Troy Staton – engineering
- Manny Lecuona – mastering
- Fun Lovin' Criminals – additional producers & re-mixing on "Dr. Greenthumb (Fun Lovin' Criminals Remix)"
- I.S.P. – additional producer & re-mixing on "Dr. Greenthumb (Fun Lovin' Criminals Remix)"

== Chart performance ==
Chart (1998–1999)	Peak position
Germany (GfK)	47
UK Singles (OCC)	34
UK Dance (OCC)	7
UK Hip Hop/R&B (OCC)	9
US Billboard Hot 100	70
US Hot R&B/Hip-Hop Songs (Billboard)	57
US Hot Rap Songs (Billboard)	14
