= Cypress Hill III: Temples of Boom =

Studio album by Cypress Hill
- Released: October 31, 1995
- Recorded: 1994–1995
- Genre: West Coast hip-hop; Latin hip-hop; alternative hip-hop; hardcore hip-hop
- Length: 55:54
- Label: Ruffhouse; Columbia
- Producer: DJ Muggs; RZA

Cypress Hill chronology
| Black Sunday (1993) | Cypress Hill III: Temples of Boom (1995) | IV (1998) |

Singles from III: Temples of Boom
- 1. "Throw Your Set in the Air" Released: September 26, 1995; 2. "Illusions" Released: February 20, 1996; 3. "Boom Biddy Bye Bye" Released: May 21, 1996

Cypress Hill III: Temples of Boom is the third studio album by Latin-American hip-hop group Cypress Hill. It was released on October 31, 1995, by Ruffhouse and Columbia Records. It was the first album to feature Eric Bobo as an official member of the group. The album featured a stylistic change, as the group turned towards a darker, tranquil, slower, and spookier sound with their beats. The album went Platinum in the U.S. with 1 million units sold.

== Background ==
With this album, the group turned towards a more tranquil, sedate, slower, spooky sound with their beats.

Wu-Tang Clan members RZA and U-God both make an appearance on the track "Killa Hill Niggas".

Also notable was the track "No Rest for the Wicked", which ignited the feud between Cypress Hill and rapper Ice Cube. Cypress Hill claimed that the hook in Ice Cube's single "Friday" (from the film of the same name) was stolen from their song "Throw Your Set in the Air". At the peak of the feud, on the "Temples of Boom" tour, the group would take time between songs to talk about this and get the crowd to yell obscenities about Ice Cube.

The darker mood tone reflected the strife in the 1990s and the different aspects the group faced as they became more famous. During this era member Sen Dog temporarily left the band to pursue other projects.

== Reception ==
Professional ratings
Review scores
| Source | Rating |
|---|---|
| AllMusic | 3.5/5 stars |
| Chicago Tribune | 3/4 stars |
| Christgau's Consumer Guide | (dud) |
| The Encyclopedia of Popular Music | 3/5 stars |
| Entertainment Weekly | C+ |
| NME | 7/10 |
| Q | 4/5 stars |
| Rolling Stone | 3.5/5 stars |
| The Rolling Stone Album Guide | 2/5 stars |
| Spin | 5/10 |

- Rolling Stone - 3.5 Stars - Good - "…half of III bumps with a new and improved Cypress Hill sound that marks producer Muggs' progress.… For all the rude immediacy of its rhymes, III is an album of many musical hues…Cypress Hill still wield an intoxicating power that's all their own…"
- Q - 4 Stars - Excellent - "The production is sophisticated, incorporating Indian sitar and sloping, almost psychedelic bass grooves to create a vaguely threatening ambient hardcore."
- Melody Maker - Bloody Essential - "…resonates with freakish cheese-wire paranoia…a gobsmacking paradox of expansive claustrophobia.… The funk patters like an erratic heartbeat, the voices are stretched to bursting with menace and loathing and mockery…"
- Rap Pages - 7 (out of 10) - "B-Real spits out lyric after lyric lambasting critics, ex-homies and anyone else not down with his familia.… Some of the record might sound familiar, but, hey, that's the Cypress sound."
- NME - 7 (out of 10) - "At its most powerful, tuneful, sarcastic and entertaining, it's sneering '90s hip-hop.… In the weeks of the OJ fall-out and the Nation Of Islam Million Man March, Cypress Hill have made the album which reflects US and, therefore, global paranoia with spookily apt timing."

== Track listing ==
- All tracks produced by DJ Muggs, except track 5 produced by RZA

| No. | Title | Writer(s) | Length |
|---|---|---|---|
| 1. | "Spark Another Owl" | Lawrence Muggerud; Louis Freese | 3:40 |
| 2. | "Throw Your Set in the Air" | Muggerud; Freese | 4:08 |
| 3. | "Stoned Raiders" | Muggerud; Freese; Senen Reyes | 2:54 |
| 4. | "Illusions" | Muggerud; Freese | 4:28 |
| 5. | "Killa Hill Niggas" (featuring RZA and U-God of Wu-Tang Clan) | Freese; Reyes; Robert Diggs | 4:03 |
| 6. | "Boom Biddy Bye Bye" | Muggerud; Freese; Reyes | 4:04 |
| 7. | "No Rest for the Wicked" | Muggerud; Freese | 5:01 |
| 8. | "Make a Move" | Muggerud; Freese | 4:33 |
| 9. | "Killafornia" | Muggerud; Freese | 2:56 |
| 10. | "Funk Freakers" | Muggerud; Freese | 3:16 |
| 11. | "Locotes" | Muggerud; Freese; Reyes | 3:39 |
| 12. | "Red Light Visions" | Muggerud; Freese | 1:46 |
| 13. | "Strictly Hip Hop" | Muggerud; Freese | 4:33 |
| 14. | "Let It Rain" | Muggerud; Freese | 3:45 |

Bonus tracks
| No. | Title | Writer(s) | Length |
|---|---|---|---|
| 15. | "Everybody Must Get Stoned" | Muggerud; Freese | 3:05 |
| 16. | "Smuggler's Blues" (Japanese Bonus track) | | 4:23 |
| 17. | "Buddha Mix" (Bonus CD edition only) | | 20:54 |

== Personnel ==
- B-Real - Vocals
- Sen Dog - Vocals
- Shag - Backing vocalist
- Eric "Bobo" Correa - Conga
- Red Dog - Organ, Bass guitar
- DJ Muggs - Arranger, Producer, Mixing
- Jason Roberts - Engineer, Mixing
- RZA - Producer, Engineer, Mixing, Guest vocals
- U-God - Guest vocals
- Ben Wallach - Assistant Engineer
- Lamont Hyde - Assistant Engineer
- Dante Ariola - Design
- Jamie Caliri - Cover Photo
- Codikow - Representation
- Ricky Harris - Interlude
- Manny Lecouna - Mastering
- Joe Nicolo - Mixing
- Ross Donaldson - Mixing
- Jay Papke - Design
- Ken Schles - Photography
- Chris McCann - Photography

== Charts ==
Album - Billboard (North America)

| Year | Chart | Position |
|---|---|---|
| 1995 | The Billboard 200 | 3 |
| 1995 | Top R&B/Hip-Hop Albums | 3 |

== Certifications ==
| Region | Certification | Certified units/sales |
|---|---|---|
| Canada (Music Canada) | Gold | 50,000^{^} |
| United Kingdom (BPI) | Gold | 100,000^{*} |
| United States (RIAA) | Platinum | 1,000,000^{^} |
^{*} Sales figures based on certification alone.^{^} Shipments figures based on certification alone.
