= Cypress Hill =

American hip-hop group

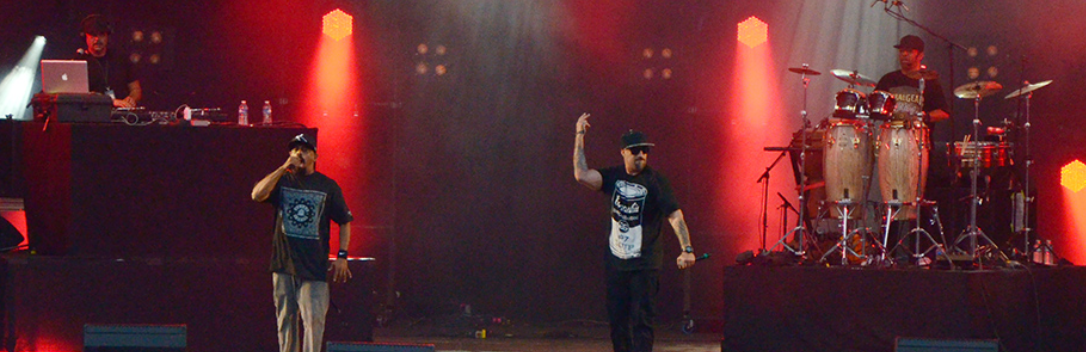
- Sen Dog, Eric Bobo, and B-Real of Cypress Hill

Background information
- Also known as: DVX (1988)
- Origin: South Gate, California, U.S.
- Genres: West Coast hip-hop; gangsta rap; hardcore hip-hop; psychedelic rap; rap rock
- Years active: 1988–present
- Labels: Ruffhouse; Columbia; Priority; EMI
- Spinoffs: Sol Invicto; Prophets of Rage; SX-10; Soul Assassins
- Members: B-Real; Sen Dog; Eric Bobo; DJ Muggs
- Past members: Mellow Man Ace
- Website: cypresshill.com

Cypress Hill is an American hip-hop group formed in South Gate, California in 1988. One of the first Latin American groups to gain mainstream recognition in hip-hop, they have sold over 20 million albums worldwide, and have obtained multi-platinum and RIAA platinum certifications. They are considered to be among the main progenitors of West Coast hip-hop and 1990s hip-hop. All of the group members advocate for recreational marijuana use as well as medical marijuana use of cannabis in the United States. In 2019, Cypress Hill became the first hip-hop group to have a star on the Hollywood Walk of Fame.

== History ==
=== Formation (1988) ===
Senen Reyes (also known as Sen Dog) and Ulpiano Sergio Reyes (also known as Mellow Man Ace) are brothers born in Pinar del Río, Cuba. In 1971, their family emigrated to the United States and initially lived in South Gate, California. In 1988, the two brothers teamed up with New York City native Lawrence Muggerud (also known as DJ Muggs, previously in a rap group named 7A3) and Louis Freese (also known as B-Real) to form a hip-hop group named DVX (Devastating Vocal Excellence). The band soon lost Mellow Man Ace to a solo career, and changed their name to Cypress Hill, after a street in South Gate.

=== Mainstream success with Cypress Hill and Black Sunday, addition of Eric Bobo, and III: Temples of Boom (1989–1996) ===
After recording a demo in 1989, Cypress Hill signed a record deal with Ruffhouse Records. Their self-titled first album was released in August 1991. The lead single was the double A-side "The Phuncky Feel One"/"How I Could Just Kill a Man" which received heavy airplay on urban and college radio, most notably peaking at No. 1 on Billboard's Hot Rap Tracks chart and at No. 77 on the Billboard Hot 100. The other two singles released from the album were "Hand on the Pump" and "Latin Lingo", the latter of which combined English and Spanish lyrics, a trait that was continued throughout their career. The success of these singles led Cypress Hill to sell two million copies in the U.S. alone, and it peaked at No. 31 on the Billboard 200 and was certified double platinum by the RIAA. In 1992, Cypress Hill's first contribution to a soundtrack was the song "Shoot 'Em Up" for the film Juice. Cypress Hill's songs started to appear more frequently in major Hollywood films, such as Lethal Weapon 3 ("Latin Lingo") and White Men Can't Jump ("A to the K") also from 1992. The group made their first appearance at Lollapalooza on the side stage in 1992. It was the festival's second year of touring, and featured a diverse lineup of acts such as Red Hot Chili Peppers, Ice Cube, Lush, Tool, Stone Temple Pilots, among others. The trio also supported the Cypress Hill album by touring with the Beastie Boys, who were touring behind their third album Check Your Head.

Black Sunday, the group's second album, debuted at No. 1 on the Billboard 200 in 1993, recording the highest Soundscan for a rap group up until that time. "Insane in the Brain" became a crossover hit, peaking at No. 19 on the Billboard Hot 100, at No. 16 on the Dance Club Songs chart, and at No. 1 on the Hot Rap Tracks chart. "Insane in the Brain" also garnered the group their first Grammy nomination. Black Sunday went triple platinum in the U.S. and sold about 3.26 million copies. Cypress Hill headlined the Soul Assassins tour with House of Pain, Funkdoobiest, and The Whooliganz as support, then performed on a college tour with Rage Against the Machine and Seven Year Bitch. Also in 1993, Cypress Hill had two tracks on the Judgment Night soundtrack, teaming up with Pearl Jam (without vocalist Eddie Vedder) on the track "Real Thing" and Sonic Youth on "I Love You Mary Jane". The soundtrack was notable for intentionally creating collaborations between the rap/hip-hop and rock/metal genres, and as a result the soundtrack peaked at No. 17 on the Billboard 200 and was certified gold by the RIAA. On October 2, 1993, Cypress Hill performed on the comedy show Saturday Night Live, broadcast by NBC. Prior to their performances, studio executives, label representatives, and the group's own associates constantly asked the trio to not smoke marijuana on-stage. DJ Muggs became irritated due to the constant inquisitions, and he subsequently lit a joint during the group's second song. Up until that point, it was extremely uncommon to see marijuana usage on a live televised broadcast. The incident prompted NBC to ban the group from returning on the show, a distinction shared only by six other artists.

The group later played at Woodstock 94, officially making percussionist Eric Bobo a member of the group during the performance. Eric Bobo was the son of Willie Bobo and a touring member of the Beastie Boys, who Cypress Hill previously toured with in 1992. That same year, Rolling Stone named Cypress Hill Best Rap Group in their music awards voted by critics and readers. Cypress Hill then played at Lollapalooza for two successive years, topping the bill in 1995. They also appeared on the "Homerpalooza" episode of The Simpsons. The group received their second Grammy nomination in 1995 for "I Ain't Goin' Out Like That".

Cypress Hill's third album III: Temples of Boom was released in 1995, peaking at No. 3 on the Billboard 200 and at No. 3 on the Canadian Albums Chart. The album was certified platinum by the RIAA. "Throw Your Set in the Air" was the most successful single off the album, peaking at No. 45 on the Billboard Hot 100 and No. 11 on the Hot Rap Tracks chart. The single also earned Cypress Hill's third Grammy nomination. Shortly after the release of III: Temples of Boom, Sen Dog became frustrated due to the rigorous touring schedule. Just prior to an overseas tour, he departed from the group unexpectedly. Cypress Hill continued their tours throughout 1995 and 1996, with Eric Bobo and also various guest vocalists covering Sen Dog's verses. Sen Dog later formed the rock band SX-10 to explore other musical genres. Later on in 1996, Cypress Hill appeared on the first Smokin' Grooves tour, featuring Ziggy Marley, the Fugees, Busta Rhymes, and A Tribe Called Quest. The group also released a nine track EP, Unreleased and Revamped with rare mixes.

=== Focus on solo projects, IV, crossover appeal with Skull & Bones, and Stoned Raiders (1997–2002) ===
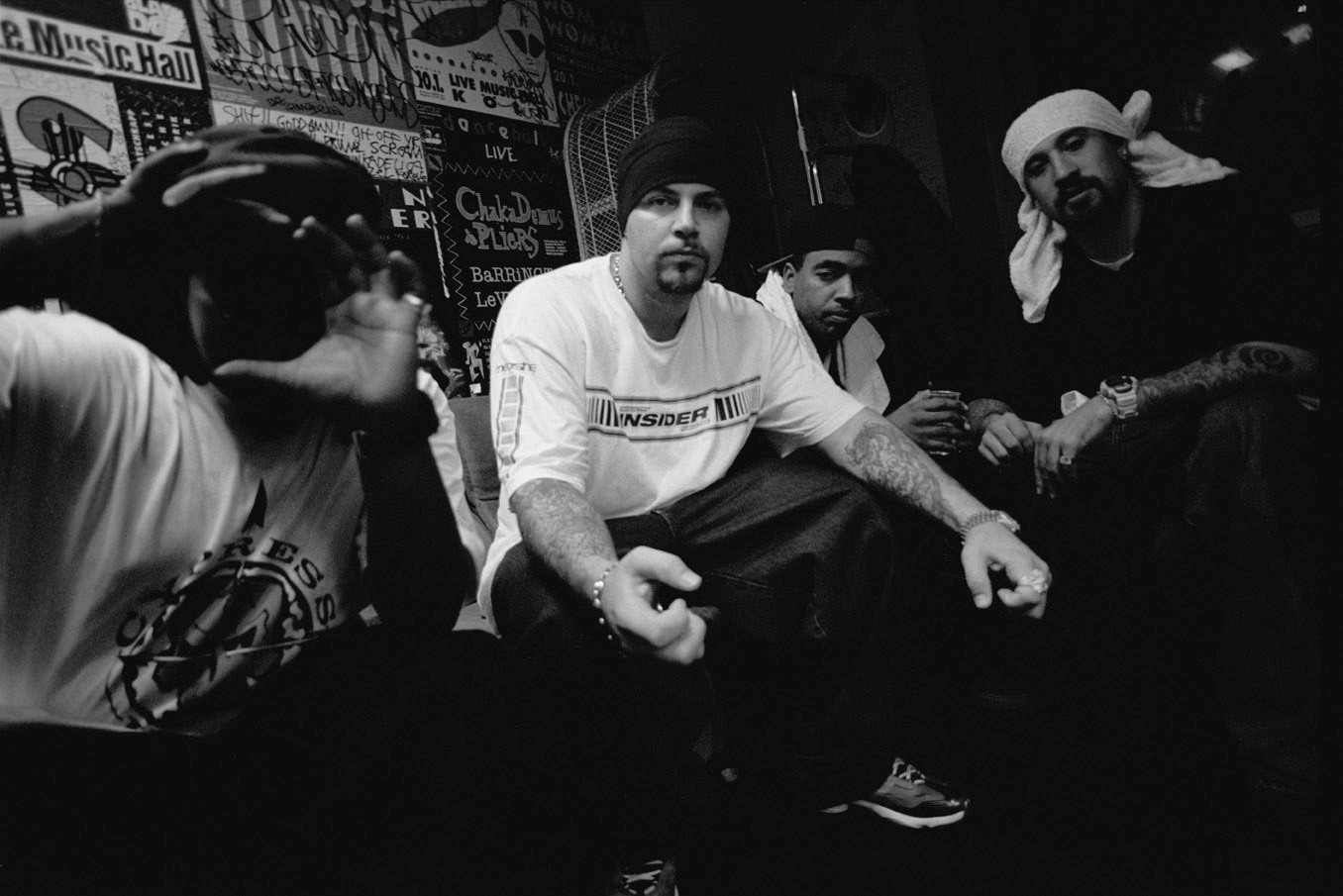
Germany 1998

In 1997, the members focused on their solo careers. DJ Muggs released Soul Assassins: Chapter 1, with features from Dr. Dre, KRS-One, Wyclef Jean, and Mobb Deep. B-Real appeared with Busta Rhymes, Coolio, LL Cool J, and Method Man on "Hit 'Em High" from the multi-platinum Space Jam Soundtrack. He also appeared with RBX, Nas, and KRS-One on "East Coast Killer, West Coast Killer" from Dr. Dre's Dr. Dre Presents the Aftermath album, and contributed to an album entitled The Psycho Realm with the group of the same name. Sen Dog also released the Get Wood sampler as part of SX-10 on the label Flip Records. In addition, Eric Bobo contributed drums to various rock bands on their albums, such as 311 and Soulfly.

In early 1998, Sen Dog returned to Cypress Hill. He cited his therapist and also his creative collaborations with the band SX-10 as catalysts for his rejoining. The quartet then embarked on the third annual Smokin' Grooves tour with Public Enemy, Wyclef Jean, Busta Rhymes, and Gang Starr. Cypress Hill released IV in October 1998 which went gold in the U.S. and peaked at No. 11 on the Billboard 200. The lead single off the album was "Dr. Greenthumb", as it peaked at No. 11 on the Hot Rap Tracks chart. It also peaked at No. 70 on the Billboard Hot 100, their last appearance on the chart to date.

In 1999, Cypress Hill composed the soundtrack for the PC first-person shooter video game Kingpin: Life of Crime, three of the band's songs from the 1998 IV album were in the game; "16 Men Till There's No Men Left", "Checkmate", and "Lightning Strikes". The group also did voice work for some of the game's characters. Also in 1999, the band released a greatest hits album in Spanish, Los Grandes Éxitos en Español.

In 2000, Cypress Hill fused genres with their fifth album, Skull & Bones, which consisted of two discs. The first disc Skull was composed of rap tracks while Bones explored further the group's forays into rock. The album peaked at No. 5 on the Billboard 200 and at No. 3 on the Canadian Albums Chart, and the album was eventually certified platinum by the RIAA. The first two singles were "(Rock) Superstar" for rock radio and "(Rap) Superstar" for urban radio. Both singles received heavy airplay on both rock and urban radio, enabling Cypress Hill to crossover again. "(Rock) Superstar" peaked at No. 18 on the Modern Rock Tracks chart and "(Rap) Superstar" peaked at No. 43 on the Hot Rap Tracks chart.

Due to the rock genre's prominent appearance on Skull & Bones, Cypress Hill employed the members of Sen Dog's band SX-10 as backing musicians for the live shows. Cypress Hill supported Skull & Bones by initially playing a summer tour with Limp Bizkit and Cold called the Back 2 Basics Tour. The tour was controversial as it was sponsored by the file sharing service Napster. In addition, Napster enabled each show of the tour to be free to the fans, and no security guards were employed during the performances. After the tour's conclusion, the acts had not reported any disturbances. Towards the end of 2000, Cypress Hill and MxPx landed a slot opening for The Offspring on the Conspiracy of One Tour. The group also released Live at the Fillmore, a concert disc recorded at San Francisco's The Fillmore in 2000. Cypress Hill continued their experimentation with rock on the Stoned Raiders album in 2001; however, its sales were a disappointment. The album peaked at No. 64 on the Billboard 200, the group's lowest position to that point. Also in 2001, the group made a cameo appearance as themselves in the film How High. Cypress Hill then recorded the track "Just Another Victim" for WWF as a theme song for Tazz, borrowing elements from the 2000 single "(Rock) Superstar". The song would later be featured on the compilation WWF Forceable Entry in March 2002, which peaked at No. 3 on the Billboard 200 and was certified gold by the RIAA.

=== Till Death Do Us Part, DJ Muggs' hiatus, and extensive collaborations on Rise Up (2003–2012) ===
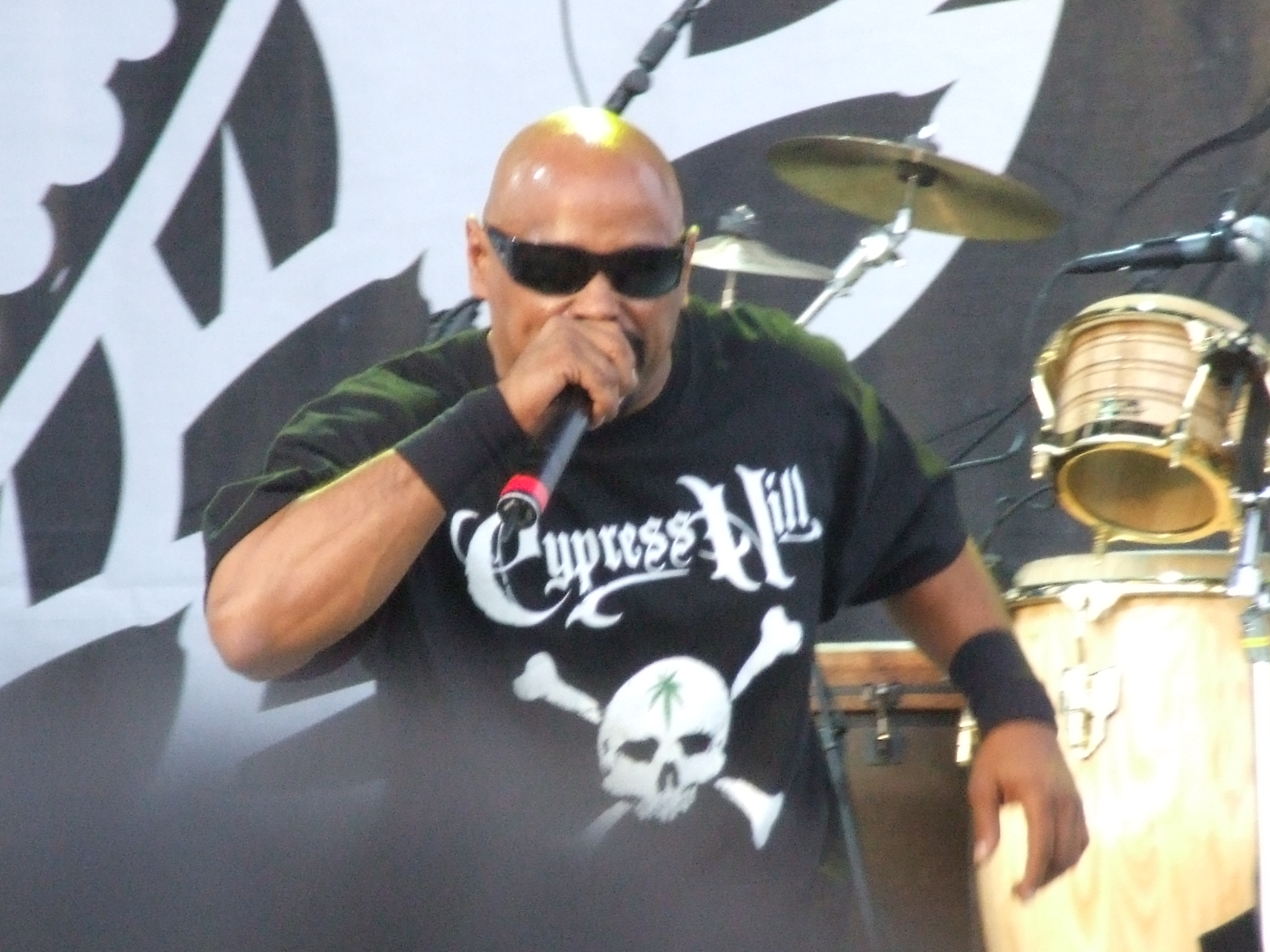
Vegoose Festival, Sam Boyd Stadium, 2007

Cypress Hill released Till Death Do Us Part in March 2004 as it peaked at No. 21 on the Billboard 200. It featured appearances by Bob Marley's son Damian Marley, Prodigy of Mobb Deep, and producers The Alchemist and Fredwreck. The album represented a further departure from the group's signature sound. Reggae was a strong influence on its sound, especially on the lead single "What's Your Number?". The track featured Tim Armstrong of Rancid on guitar and backup vocals. It was based on the classic song "The Guns of Brixton" from The Clash's album London Calling. "What's Your Number?" saw Cypress Hill crossover into the rock charts again, as the single peaked at No. 23 on the Modern Rock Tracks chart.

Afterwards, DJ Muggs took a hiatus from the group to focus on other projects, such as Soul Assassins and his DJ Muggs vs. collaboration albums. In December 2005 another compilation album titled Greatest Hits From the Bong was released. It included nine hits from previous albums and two new tracks. In the summer of 2006, B-Real appeared on Snoop Dogg's single "Vato", which was produced by Pharrell Williams. The group's next album was tentatively scheduled for an early 2007 release, but it was pushed back numerous times. In 2007 Cypress Hill toured as a part of the Rock the Bells tour. They headlined with Public Enemy, Wu-Tang Clan, Nas, and a reunited Rage Against the Machine.

On July 25, 2008, Cypress Hill performed at a benefit concert at the House of Blues Chicago, where a majority of the proceeds went to the Chicago Alliance to End Homelessness. In August 2009, a new song by Cypress Hill titled "Get 'Em Up" was made available on iTunes. The song was also featured in the Madden NFL 2010 video game. It was the first sampling of the group's then-upcoming album.

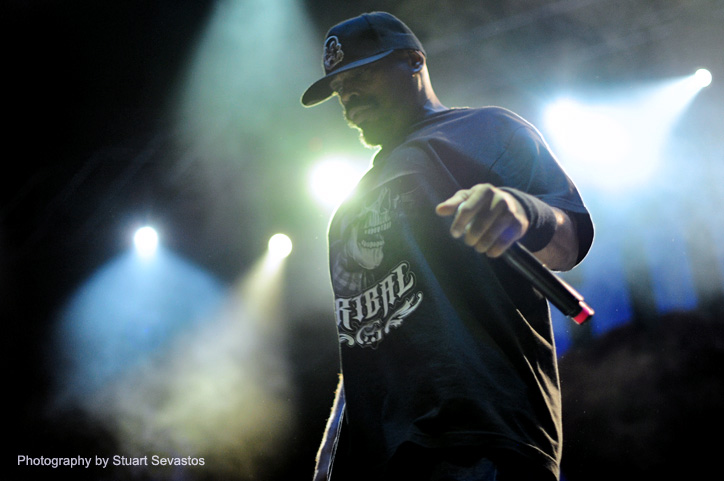
Cypress Hill at Metro City, 2010

Cypress Hill's eighth studio album Rise Up featured contributions from Everlast, Tom Morello, Daron Malakian, Pitbull, Marc Anthony, and Mike Shinoda. Previously, the vast majority of the group's albums were produced by DJ Muggs; however, Rise Up instead featured a large array of guest features and producers, with DJ Muggs only appearing on two tracks. The album was released on Priority Records/EMI Entertainment, as the group was signed to the label by new creative chairman Snoop Dogg. Rise Up was released on April 20, 2010, and it peaked at No. 19 on the Billboard 200. The single "Rise Up" was featured at WWE's pay-per-view Elimination Chamber as the official theme song for the event. It also appeared in the trailer for the movie The Green Hornet. "Rise Up" managed to peak at No. 20 on both the Modern Rock Tracks and Mainstream Rock Tracks charts. "Armada Latina", which featured Pitbull and Marc Anthony, was Cypress Hill's last song to chart in the U.S. to date, peaking at No. 25 on the Hot Rap Tracks chart.

Cypress Hill commenced its Rise Up tour in Philadelphia on April 10, 2010. In one particular instance, the group was supposed to stop in Tucson, Arizona but canceled the show in protest of the recent immigration legislation. At the Rock en Seine festival in Paris on August 27, 2010, they had said in an interview that they would anticipate the outcome of the legislation before returning. Also in 2010, Cypress Hill performed at the Reading and Leeds Festivals on August 28 at Leeds and August 29 at Reading. On June 5, 2012, Cypress Hill and dubstep artist Rusko released a collaborative EP entitled Cypress X Rusko. DJ Muggs, who was still on a hiatus, and Eric Bobo were absent on the release. Also in 2012, Cypress Hill collaborated with Deadmau5 on his sixth studio album Album Title Goes Here, lending vocals on "Failbait".

=== Elephants on Acid, Hollywood Walk of Fame, and Back in Black (2013–2022) ===
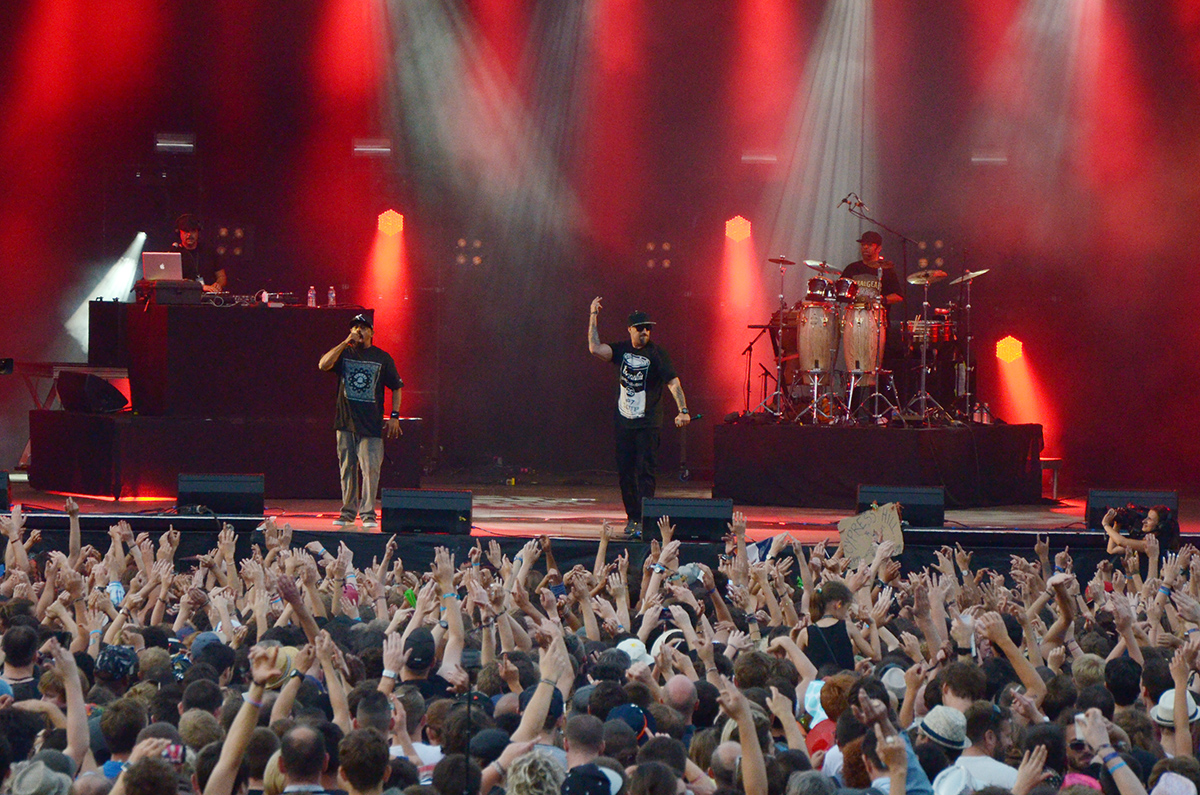
Cypress Hill on the big stage of the Beauregard festival, 2015

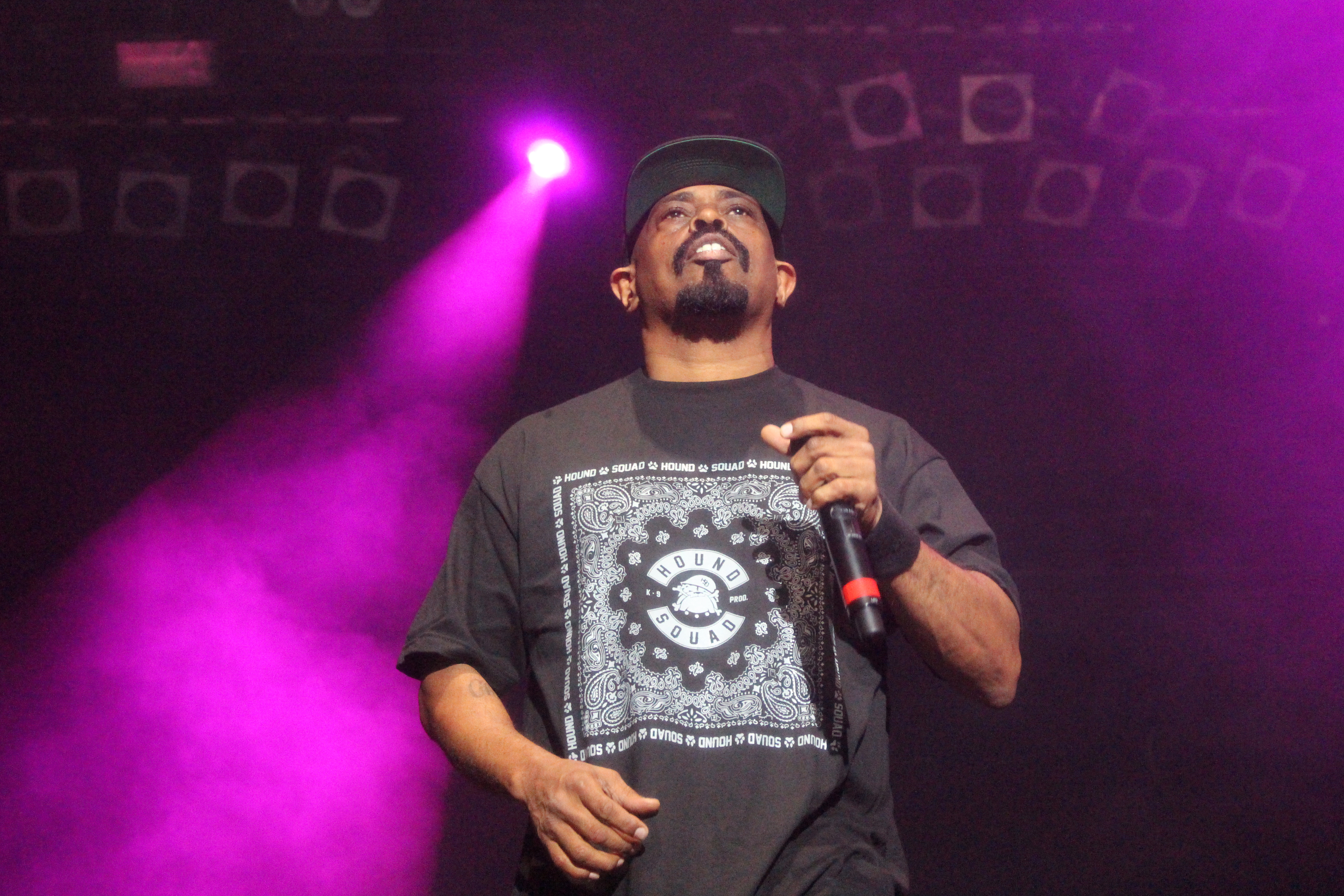
Cypress Hill – Sen Dog – Nova Rock 2016

During the interval between Cypress Hill albums, the four members commenced work on various projects. B-Real formed the band Prophets of Rage alongside three members of Rage Against the Machine and two members of Public Enemy. He also released The Prescription EP under his Dr. Greenthumb persona. Sen Dog formed the band Powerflo alongside members of Fear Factory, downset., and Biohazard. DJ Muggs revived his Soul Assassins project as its main producer. Eric Bobo formed a duo named Ritmo Machine. He also contributed to an unreleased album by his father Willie Bobo.

On September 28, 2018, Cypress Hill released the album Elephants on Acid, which saw the return of DJ Muggs as main composer and producer (DJ Muggs subsequently stayed in the group but very rarely played any live shows). It peaked at No. 120 on the Billboard 200 and at No. 6 on the Top Independent Albums chart. Overall, four different singles were released to promote the album. In April 2019 Cypress Hill received a star on the Hollywood Walk of Fame. Although various solo hip-hop artists had received stars, Cypress Hill became the first collective hip-hop group to receive a star. The entire lineup of B-Real, Sen Dog, Eric Bobo, and DJ Muggs had all attended the ceremony.

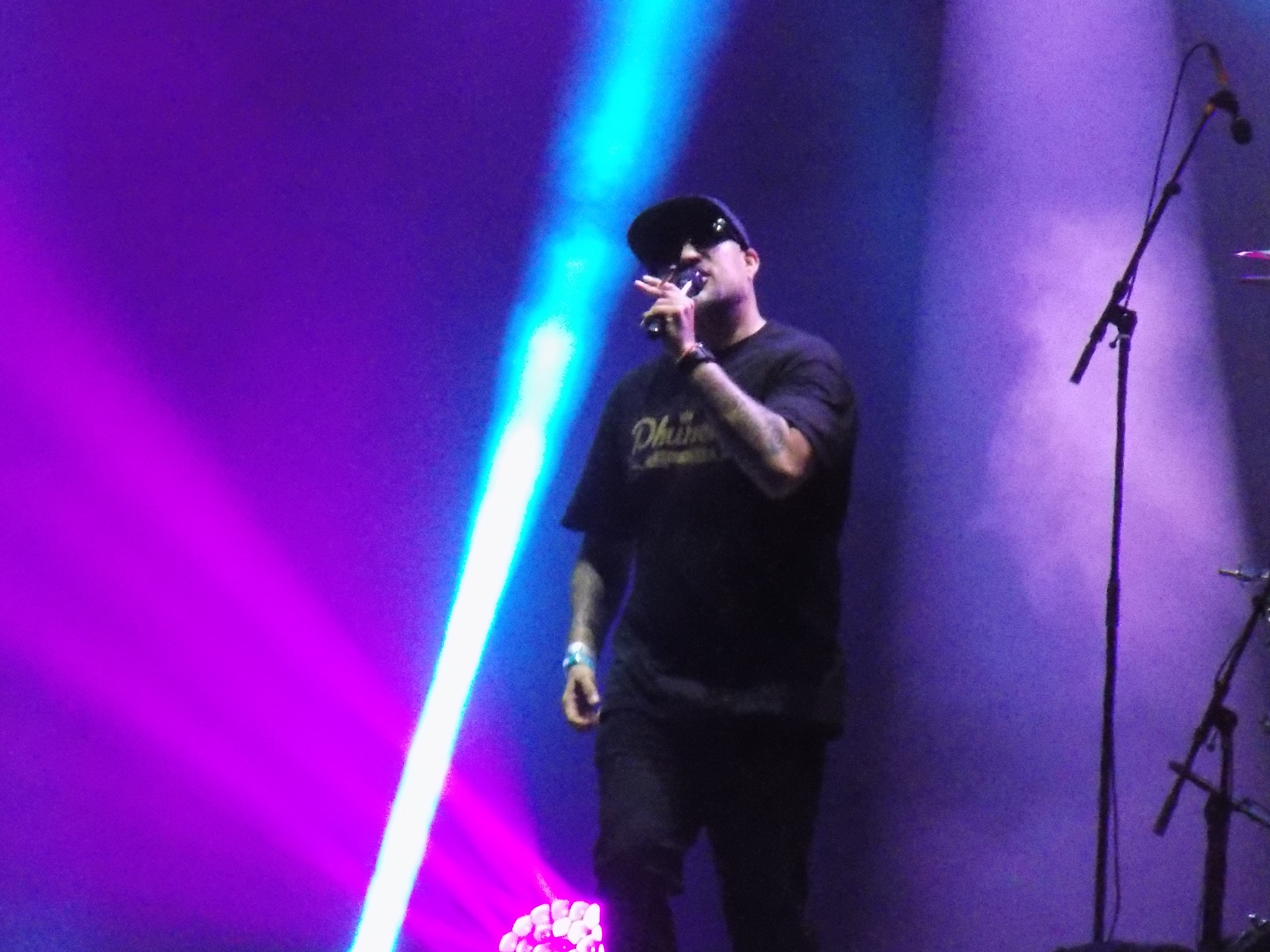
Cypress Hill – Le Cabaret Vert, 2017

In January 2022, the group announced their 10th studio album entitled Back in Black. In addition, Cypress Hill planned to support the album by joining Slipknot alongside Ho99o9 for the second half of the 2022 Knotfest Roadshow. They had previously invited Slipknot to join their Great Smoke-Out festival back in 2009. Back in Black was released on March 18, 2022. It was the group's first album to not feature DJ Muggs on any of the tracks, as producing duties were handled by Black Milk. Back in Black was the lowest charting album of the group's career, and the first to not reach the Billboard 200 chart; however, it peaked at No. 69 on the Top Current Album Sales chart.

A documentary about the group, entitled Cypress Hill: Insane in the Brain, was released on the Showtime service in April 2022. Estevan Oriol, Cypress Hill's former tour manager and close associate, directed the film. It had mainly chronicled the group's formation and their first decade of existence. In relation to the Cypress Hill: Insane in the Brain documentary, Cypress Hill digitally released the single "Crossroads" in September 2022. The single featured the return of DJ Muggs on production.

=== Dios Bendiga and future plans (2023–present) ===
In an interview, Sen Dog claimed that the group would eventually fully reunite with DJ Muggs for another studio album; however, he stated that specific album would likely be the group's final album of their career. The group performed at various festivals in 2023 such as the Festival d'été de Québec, and in celebrating the 30th anniversary of their second studio album Black Sunday, they also announced several standalone concerts in North America and Europe.

In 2024, Eric Bobo's instrumental industrial metal project Sol Invicto released their official debut EP that year, Loosely Aware. The project initially started in 2008 and also consisted of Deftones guitarist Stephen Carpenter and producer Richie Londres. Also in 2024, Cypress Hill performed alongside The Pharcyde and Souls of Mischief in May of that year. They also played in Italy, Austria, and Germany throughout July. In a callback to Cypress Hill's appearance in the 1996 "Homerpalooza" episode of The Simpsons (which contained a skit of the group realizing they must have ordered the London Symphony Orchestra while high to perform with), it was announced that the group would actually perform with the London Symphony Orchestra at London's Royal Albert Hall in July 2024. The band was joined by long-time collaborator Christian Olde Wolbers on double bass.

In early 2026, it was announced that Cypress Hill would release their 11th album later that year, with all-new material entirely sung in Spanish and production led by DJ Flict. The first single, "Wacha Trucha", was released in March. The album, titled Dios Bendiga, was given the release date of July 24, 2026. Cypress Hill was noted as one of the performers at Tom Morello's inaugural Power to the People Festival, along with Bruce Springsteen, Foo Fighters, Dropkick Murphys, among others. A variety of other festivals were booked for 2026 as well, such as Download Festival, Rock in Rio, and Aftershock Festival, along with various dates in the US and Canada.

== Style ==
=== Rapping ===
One of the band's most striking aspects is B-Real's exaggeratedly high-pitched nasal vocals. In the book Check the Technique, B-Real described his nasal style, saying his rapping voice is "high and annoying... the nasal style I have was just something that I developed... my more natural style wasn't so pleasing to DJ Muggs and Sen Dog's ears" and talking about the nasal style in the book How to Rap, B-Real said "you want to stand out from the others and just be distinct... when you got something that can separate you from everybody else, you gotta use it to your advantage." In the film Art of Rap, B-Real credited the Beastie Boys as an influence when developing his rapping style. Sen Dog's voice is deeper, more violent, and often shouted alongside the rapping; his vocals are often emphasized by adding another background/choir voice to say them. Sen Dog's style is in contrast to B-Real's, who said "Sen's voice is so strong" and "it all blends together" when they are both on the same track.

Both B-Real and Sen Dog started writing lyrics in both Spanish and English. Initially, B-Real was inspired to start writing raps from watching Sen Dog and Mellow Man Ace writing their lyrics, and originally B-Real was going to just be the writer for the group rather than a rapper. Their lyrics are noted for bringing a "cartoonish" approach to violence by Peter Shapiro and Allmusic.

=== Production ===
The sound and groove of their music, mostly produced by DJ Muggs, has spooky sounds and a stoned aesthetic; with its bass-heavy rhythms and odd sample loops ("Insane in the Brain" has a blues guitar pitched looped in its chorus), it carries a psychedelic value, which is lessened in their rock-oriented albums. The double album Skull & Bones consists of a pure rap disc (Skull) and a separate rock disc (Bones). In the live album Live at The Fillmore, some of the old classics were played in a rock/metal version, with Eric Bobo playing the drums and Sen Dog's band SX-10 as the other instrumentalists. 2010's Rise Up was the most radically different album in regards to production. DJ Muggs had produced the majority of each prior Cypress Hill album, but he only appeared on Rise Up twice. The remaining songs were handled by various other guests. 2018's Elephants on Acid marked the return of DJ Muggs, and the album featured a more psychedelic and hip-hop approach.

== Legacy ==
Cypress Hill are often credited for being one of the few Hispanic American hip-hop groups to break through with their own stylistic impact on rap music, in addition to finding a crossover audience among the rock community. Cypress Hill have been cited as an influence by artists such as Eminem, Baby Bash, Paul Wall, Post Malone, Luniz, and Fat Joe. Cypress Hill have also been cited as a strong influence on nu metal bands such as Deftones, Limp Bizkit, System of a Down, Linkin Park, Rage Against the Machine and Korn. Famously, the bassline during the outro of Korn's 1994 single "Blind" was a direct tribute to Cypress Hill's 1993 track "Lick a Shot".

== Members ==
Current

- Louis "B-Real" Freese – vocals (1988–present)
- Senen "Sen Dog" Reyes – vocals (1988–1995, 1998–present)
- Eric "Eric Bobo" Correa – drums, percussion (1994–present)
- Lawrence "DJ Muggs" Muggerud – turntables, samples (1988–2004, 2014–present) (Note: Starting in 2014, DJ Muggs remained a member of Cypress Hill, albeit usually restricted to a studio role. He has however played the occasional live show and made promotional in-person appearances with the group over the following years.)

Current touring

- Lord "DJ Lord" Asword – turntables, samples, vocals (2019–present)

Former

- Ulpiano "Mellow Man Ace" Reyes – vocals (1988)

Former touring

- Panchito "Ponch" Gomez – drums, percussion (1993–1994)
- Frank Mercurio – bass (2000–2002)
- Jeremy Fleener – guitar (2000–2002)
- Andy Zambrano – guitar (2000–2002)
- Julio "Julio G" González – turntables, samples (2004–2014)
- Michael "Mix Master Mike" Schwartz – turntables, samples (2018–2019)

== Discography ==
Studio albums

- Cypress Hill (1991)
- Black Sunday (1993)
- III: Temples of Boom (1995)
- IV (1998)
- Skull & Bones (2000)
- Stoned Raiders (2001)
- Till Death Do Us Part (2004)
- Rise Up (2010)
- Elephants on Acid (2018)
- Back in Black (2022)
- Dios Bendiga (2026)

== Awards and nominations ==
Billboard Music Awards

Year	Nominated work	Award	Result
1992	"The Phuncky Feel One"	Top Rap Song	Won

Grammy Awards

Year	Nominated work	Award	Result
1994	"Insane in the Brain"	Best Rap Performance by a Duo or Group	Nominated
1995	"I Ain't Goin' Out Like That"	Best Rap Performance by a Duo or Group	Nominated
1996	"Throw Your Set in the Air"	Best Rap Performance by a Duo or Group	Nominated

MTV Video Music Awards

Year	Nominated work	Award	Result
1994	"Insane in the Brain"	Best Rap Video	Nominated

Hollywood Walk of Fame

Year	Nominee / work	Award	Result
2019	Cypress Hill	Star	Won
