= DJ Muggs production discography =

Projects supervised by American producer

The following is a production discography of American record producer DJ Muggs. It includes a list of songs produced, co-produced and remixed by year, title, artist and album.

== Production credits ==
List of songs produced and/or co-produced, with other performing artists, showing year released and album name
Year	Song	Artist	Album	Notes
1989	"River Cubano"	Mellow Man Ace	Escape from Havana	N/A
1991	All Tracks	Cypress Hill	Cypress Hill	N/A
1991	"Shoot 'Em Up"	Cypress Hill	Juice (Original Motion Picture Soundtrack)	N/A
1992	"Babalu Bad Boy"	Mellow Man Ace	The Brother with Two Tongues	N/A
1992	"Salutations"	House of Pain	Fine Malt Lyrics	produced w/ DJ Lethal
1992	"Jump Around"	House of Pain	Fine Malt Lyrics	N/A
1992	"Put Your Head Out"	House of Pain	Fine Malt Lyrics	N/A
1992	"Danny Boy, Danny Boy"	House of Pain	Fine Malt Lyrics	N/A
1992	"Guess Who's Back"	House of Pain	Fine Malt Lyrics	N/A
1992	"Put on Your Shit Kickers"	House of Pain	Fine Malt Lyrics	N/A
1992	"Come and Get Some of This"	House of Pain	Fine Malt Lyrics	produced w/ Ralph Tha Funky Mexican
1992	"One for the Road"	House of Pain	Fine Malt Lyrics	produced w/ DJ Lethal
1992	"It's a Long Way Home"	Yo-Yo	Black Pearl	N/A
1992	"Now I Gotta Wet 'Cha"	Ice Cube	The Predator	N/A
1992	"We Had to Tear This Mothafucka Up"	Ice Cube	The Predator	N/A
1992	"Check Yo Self"	Ice Cube, Das EFX	The Predator	N/A
1992	"Vibe Up"	Daddy Freddy	Raggamuffin Soldier	N/A
1992	"Jah Jah Gives Me Vibes"	Daddy Freddy	Raggamuffin Soldier	N/A
1992	"Don Number One"	Daddy Freddy	Raggamuffin Soldier	N/A
1992	"Kill Dem Freddy"	Daddy Freddy	Raggamuffin Soldier	N/A
1992	"Move on Up"	Daddy Freddy	Raggamuffin Soldier	N/A
1993	"The Funkiest"	Funkdoobiest	Which Doobie U B?	produced w/ DJ Lethal
1993	"Bow Wow Wow"	Funkdoobiest	Which Doobie U B?	produced w/ DJ Lethal
1993	All Tracks	Cypress Hill	Black Sunday	N/A
1993	"I Love You Mary Jane"	Cypress Hill, Sonic Youth	Judgement Night (soundtrack)	N/A
1993	"Real Thing"	Cypress Hill, Pearl Jam	Judgement Night (soundtrack)	produced w/ Cypress Hill, Pearl Jam
1994	The Good Hit	Funkdoobiest	Mi Vida Loca (soundtrack)	—N/a
1994	"Back from the Dead"	House of Pain	Same As It Ever Was	produced w/ The Baka Boyz
1994	"Runnin' up on Ya"	House of Pain	Same As It Ever Was	N/A
1994	"Over There Shit"	House of Pain	Same As It Ever Was	N/A
1994	"Keep It Comin'"	House of Pain	Same As It Ever Was	N/A
1994	"Same As It Ever Was"	House of Pain	Same As It Ever Was	N/A
1994	"It Ain't a Crime"	House of Pain	Same As It Ever Was	produced w/ DJ Lethal
1995	"Clouds of Smoke"	Call O' Da Wild	Bad Boys (Music from the Motion Picture)	produced w/ Knobody, Sean C
1995	"Warning"	Super Cat	The Struggle Continues	
1995	"This Is It (Interlude)"	Funkdoobiest	Brothas Doobie	N/A
1995	"Rock On"	Funkdoobiest	Brothas Doobie	N/A
1995	"What the Deal"	Funkdoobiest	Brothas Doobie	N/A
1995	"Lost in Thought"	Funkdoobiest	Brothas Doobie	produced w/ Ray Roll
1995	"Dedicated"	Funkdoobiest	Brothas Doobie	N/A
1995	"Pussy Ain't Shit"	Funkdoobiest	Brothas Doobie	N/A
1995	"XXX Funk"	Funkdoobiest	Brothas Doobie	produced w/ Ralph Tha Funky Mexican
1995	"Who Ra Ra"	Funkdoobiest	Brothas Doobie	produced w/ Ralph Tha Funky Mexican
1995	"Superhoes"	Funkdoobiest	Friday (Soundtrack)	produced w/ Ralph Tha Funky Mexican
1995	"Roll It Up, Light It Up, Smoke It Up!	Cypress HIll	Friday (Soundtrack)	
1995	All Tracks {except track 5}	Cypress HIll	III: Temples of Boom	N/A
1996	"The Last Assassin"	Cypress HIll	The Cable Guy (Soundtrack)	N/A
1996	"Ruffturrain"	Call O' Da Wild	N/A	
1996	"Intellectual Dons"	Call O' Da Wild	Unreleased & Revamped EP	N/A
1996	"Whatta You Know"	Cypress Hill	Unreleased & Revamped EP	—N/a
1996	"Throw Your Hands in the Air"	Cypress Hill, Erick Sermon, MC Eiht and Redman	Unreleased & Revamped EP	—N/a
1996	"Bee Charmer (Reach for the Honey)"	Ingrid Schroeder	Bee Charmer	produced w/ Howie B
1996	"Not a Day Goes By"	Ingrid Schroeder	Bee Charmer	N/A
1996	"Paint You Blue"	Ingrid Schroeder	Bee Charmer	N/A
1996	"Thing in the Middle"	Ingrid Schroeder	Bee Charmer	N/A
1996	"The Foundation"	Xzibit	At the Speed of Life	N/A
1997	All Tracks	DJ Muggs	Muggs Presents... The Soul Assassins Chapter I	N/A
1997	"Ninth Symphony"	Call O' Da Wild, Cypress Hill	Gravesend (Soundtrack)	N/A
1997	"I'm Still #1"	Cypress Hill	In tha Beginning...There Was Rap	—N/a
1997	"Can I Get Mine"	MC Eiht	Last Man Standing	N/A
1997	"Got Cha Humpin'"	MC Eiht	Last Man Standing	N/A
1997	"Tha Way We Run It"	MC Eiht, B-Real	Last Man Standing	N/A
1997	"When All Hell Breaks Loose"	MC Eiht	Last Man Standing	N/A
1997	"Can't Stop, Won't Stop"	KRS-One	I Got Next	—N/a
1998	"Inshallah"	Goodie Mob	Still Standing	produced w/ Organized Noize
1998	"Bulworth (They Talk About It While We Live It)"	Method Man, KRS-One, Kam, Prodigy	Bulworth (Soundtrack)	N/A
1998	All Tracks	Cypress Hill	IV	N/A
1998	"Heist of the Century"	La the Darkman, Killa Sin	Heist of the Century	N/A
1999	"Call Me"	Tricky	Juxtapose	produced w/ Tricky
1999	"Wash My Soul"	Tricky	Juxtapose	produced w/ Tricky
1999	All Tracks	Cypress Hill	Los grandes exitos en espanol	N/A
2000	All Tracks	Cypress Hill	Skull & Bones	N/A
2000	"U Know the Rules (Mi Vida Loca)"	Tony Touch, Cypress Hill	The Piece Maker	N/A
2000	"Promotor Super Estrella"	Mellow Man Ace	From the Darkness into the Light	N/A
2000	"Ten La Fe"	Mellow Man Ace	From the Darkness into the Light	N/A
2000	"Real Life"	Kool G Rap	Muggs Presents Soul Assassins II	N/A
2000	"We Will Survive"	Godfather Pt. III	Muggs Presents Soul Assassins II	N/A
2000	"You Better Believe It"	Xzibit, King T	Muggs Presents Soul Assassins II	N/A
2000	"When the Fat Lady Sings"	GZA	Muggs Presents Soul Assassins II	N/A
2000	"This Some'n To"	Goodie Mob	Muggs Presents Soul Assassins II	N/A
2000	"Armageddon (Interlude)"	Kurupt	Muggs Presents Soul Assassins II	N/A
2000	"Heart of the Assassin"	Chace Infinite, Krondon, Phenam a.k.a. Don Krisis, Ras Kass	Muggs Presents Soul Assassins II	N/A
2000	"When the Pain Inflict"	Kurupt, Roscoe	Muggs Presents Soul Assassins II	N/A
2000	"Don't Trip"	Cypress Hill	Muggs Presents Soul Assassins II	N/A
2000	"Razor to Your Throat"	Everlast	Muggs Presents Soul Assassins II	N/A
2000	"Soul Assassination"	Afu-Ra	Body of the Life Force	N/A
2000	"Just a Song"	Goodie Mob	Bamboozled (Soundtrack)	N/A
2001	"Can I Live"	Cypress Hill	OZ: The Soundtrack	N/A
2001	"Greed"	Cypress Hill, Kokane	Training Day: The Soundtrack	N/A
2001	"Training Day (In My Hood)"	Roscoe	Training Day: The Soundtrack	N/A
2001	"Race Urbaine"	Big Red	Redsistance	N/A
2001	All Tracks	Cypress Hill	Stoned Raiders	N/A
2001	"Suzi Wong"	The Last Emperor	N/A	N/A
2002	"Gangster Gumbo"	Snoop Dogg, Roscoe, Jayo Felony	Soul Assassins Mixtape Vol. One	N/A
2002	"Gangster"	Big Noyd	Soul Assassins Mixtape Vol. One	N/A
2002	"Child of the Wild West"	Roni Size, Cypress Hill	Blade II: The Soundtrack	produced w/ Roni Size
2002	"Luminal"	GZA	Legend of the Liquid Sword	N/A
2003	All Tracks	N/A	Dust	N/A
2003	"Champions"	PMD, Cypress Hill	The Awakening	N/A
2004	All Tracks {except 3,4 & 15}	Cypress Hill	Till Death Do Us Part	N/A
2004	"Girl For All Seasons"	Northern State	All City	N/A
2004	"Style I Bring"	Northern State	All City	N/A
2004	All Tracks {except 2, 5 & 12}	DJ Muggs	The Last Assassin	N/A
2005	"Bass Chasers"	Mitchy Slick	Urban Survival Syndrome	N/A
2005	"I Know"	Mitchy Slick	Urban Survival Syndrome	N/A
2005	"Lost Without You"	Mitchy Slick	Urban Survival Syndrome	N/A
2005	"Black Opera"	Supernatural, Raekwon	S.P.I.T.: Spiritual Poetry Ignites Thought	N/A
2005	All Tracks	GZA	Grandmasters	N/A
2005	"Smockaz Roule"	Big Red, Sen Dog	Raggamuffin Culture	N/A
2006	"It's Yours"	Mellow Man Ace, Sen Dog, O. Brown	Ghetto Therapy	N/A
2007	All Tracks	Sick Jacken, Cynic	Legend of the Mask and the Assassin	N/A
2007	"The Freshest Filipino"	Roscoe Umali	I Love My DJ's	N/A
2008	"Andrews Ave."	Call O' Da Wild	N/A	N/A
2008	"Urban Wilderness"	Call O' Da Wild	N/A	N/A
2008	"Folk Nation"	Ca$his	Blacc Jesus Mixtape	N/A
2008	All Tracks	Planet Asia	Pain Language	N/A
2008	"This Is Who I Am"	Ill Bill	The Hour of Reprisal	N/A
2008	"Only Time Will Tell"	Ill Bill, Necro, Tech N9ne, Everlast	The Hour of Reprisal	N/A
2008	"Folsom Prison Blues"	Everlast	Love, War and the Ghost of Whitey Ford	co-producer; prod. by Keefus Ciancia, Everlast
2008	"Ludlow Wakes Up"	Graeme Revell	Street Kings (Music from the Motion Picture)	produced w/ Graeme Revell
2008	"Washington's Drive"	Graeme Revell	Street Kings (Music from the Motion Picture)	produced w/ Graeme Revell
2008	"Chasing Quicks"	Graeme Revell	Street Kings (Music from the Motion Picture)	produced w/ Graeme Revell
2008	"Drive to Fremont and Coates"	Graeme Revell	Street Kings (Music from the Motion Picture)	produced w/ Graeme Revell
2008	"Street Kings X"	Graeme Revell	Street Kings (Music from the Motion Picture)	produced w/ Graeme Revell
2009	"All Ya'll Can Get It"	Roscoe, Kurupt, B-Real	Philaphornia 2: Tha Philly Fanatic	N/A
2009	"Gangsta Shit"	Bun B, M-1	DJ Muggs Presents: Soul Assassins – Intermission	N/A
2009	"Rep Yo Shit"	Sick Jacken, Necro	DJ Muggs Presents: Soul Assassins – Intermission	N/A
2009	"Champions" (Remix)	Prodigy, Twin Gambino	DJ Muggs Presents: Soul Assassins – Intermission	N/A
2009	"Let Go (My Life)"	Fashawn	DJ Muggs Presents: Soul Assassins – Intermission	produced w/ DJ Khalil
2009	"Call It Like I See It"	Krondon, Chace Infinite	DJ Muggs Presents: Soul Assassins – Intermission	N/A
2009	"Match Box"	Dust	DJ Muggs Presents: Soul Assassins – Intermission	N/A
2010	"Pass the Dutch"	Cypress Hill, Evidence, The Alchemist	Rise Up	produced w/ DJ Khalil
2010	"Take My Pain"	Cypress Hill, Everlast	Rise Up	produced w/ DJ Khalil
2010	"No Spiritual Surrender"	Vinnie Paz, Sick Jacken	Season of the Assassin	N/A
2010	All Tracks {except track 11}	Ill Bill, Sick Jacken, Uncle Howie	Kill Devil Hills	N/A
2010	All Tracks	Bambu	The Los Angeles, Philippines Mixtape	N/A
2011	"Leviathan (The Spell of Kingu)"	Heavy Metal Kings	Heavy Metal Kings	N/A
2011	"Fear Itself"	Apathy	Honkey Kong	N/A
2012	"Con Safos"	SaV!, Mista Melo	TWCT: Intensified Effects	N/A
2012	"Γάμα Τους"	Killah P	Ηλιοκαψίματα	produced w/ The Alchemist
2013	"Power"	Ill Bill, O.C., Cormega	The Grimy Awards	N/A
2013	"Opio y Nicotina"	El Sicario	Mitologia Criminal	N/A
2013	"Terrores De La Zona"	El Sicario, Sick Jacken, Block McCloud	Mitologia Criminal	N/A
2013	All Tracks	DJ Muggs	Bass for Your Face	N/A
2014	All Tracks	Cross My Heart Hope To Die	Cross My Heart Hope to Die	produced w/ Andrew Kline
2014	"Rat Trap 666"	Die Antwoord	Donker Mag	N/A
2016	"Live Ginger"	Meyhem Lauren	Piatto D'oro	N/A
2016	"Elevation"	Meyhem Lauren	Piatto D'oro	N/A
2016	"Pale Horse"	Napoleon da Legend	Steal This Mixtape Too	N/A
2017	All Tracks	Meyhem Lauren	Gems from the Equinox	N/A
2018	"Floating Goat"	Vinnie Paz	The Pain Collector	N/A
2018	"Conversations With Doubt (Devil)"	Napoleon da Legend	Steal This Mixtape Part 4	N/A
2018	"John Bena"	Westside Gunn, Lil' Eto	Hitler Wears Hermes VI	N/A
2018	All Tracks	Meyhem Lauren	Frozen Angels	N/A
2018	All Tracks	Cypress Hill	Elephants on Acid	N/A
2018	All Tracks	N/A	Soul Assassins: Dia del Asesinato	N/A
2018	All Tracks	Roc Marciano	Kaos	N/A
2019	All Tracks	Lil' Eto	Hells Roof	N/A
2019	All Tracks	Mach-Hommy	Tuez-Les Tous	N/A
2019	"New Recruits Outtro"	Flee Lord	Gets Greater Later	N/A
2019	"Lakers vs Rockets"	Westside Gunn, Sauce Walka	Flygod Is An Awesome God	N/A
2019	All Tracks	Mach-Hommy	Kill Em All	N/A
2019	All Tracks	Crimeapple	Medallo	N/A
2019	"Aztec Show Flakes"	Meyhem Lauren	Members Only	N/A
2019	"GT3"	Meyhem Lauren	Members Only	N/A
2019	"Wavy"	Meyhem Lauren	Members Only	N/A
2019	"Blue Chinese"	Meyhem Lauren	Members Only	N/A
2019	"Black Spoons"	Conway the Machine	Look What I Became	N/A
2019	All Tracks	Tha God Fahim	Dump Assassins	N/A
2020	"Iron Fist"	Tha God Fahim	Lost Kingz	N/A
2020	"No Vacancy"	Westside Gunn	Pray for Paris	N/A
2020	"Vega"	Action Bronson	Only for Dolphins	N/A
2020	All Tracks	Al Divino	Kilogram	N/A
2020	All Tracks	N/A	Winter	N/A
2021	All Tracks	Rome Streetz	Death & The Magician	N/A
2021	All Tracks	N/A	Dies Occidendum	N/A
2021	All Tracks	Flee Lord	Rammellzee	N/A
2021	All Tracks	Yelawolf	Mile Zero	N/A
2021	All Tracks	Hologram, Meyhem Lauren	American Cheese	N/A
2021	All Tracks	Crimeapple	Cartagena	N/A
2021	All Tracks	N/A	Winter 2	N/A
2022	All Tracks	Rigz	Gold	N/A
2022	All Tracks	Crimeapple	Sin Cortar	N/A
2022	All Tracks	Jay Worthy	What They Hittin 4	N/A
2023	All Tracks	N/A	Soul Assassins 3: Death Valley	N/A

== Remixes ==
List of songs remixed, with other performing artists, showing year released and album name
Year	Song	Artist	Album	Notes
1991	Hand on the Pump (Blunted Mix)	Cypress Hill	—N/a	—N/a
1992	"So What 'Cha Want" (Soul Assassin Remix)	Beastie Boys, Cypress Hill	N/A	N/A
1992	"N.Y.C. (Can You Believe This City?) {The Brooklyn Beat}"	Charles & Eddie	N/A	N/A
1992	"Spill the Wine" (D.J. Muggs Remix) /(Muggsamental Version)	A Lighter Shade of Brown	N/A	N/A
1992	"Shamrocks and Shenanigans (Boom Shalock Lock Boom)" (Muggs Main Mix)	House of Pain	N/A	N/A
1992	"Bow Wow Wow" (Remix)	Funkdoobiest	N/A	N/A
1993	Wopbabalubop (Soul Assassins Remix)	Funkdoobiest	—N/a	remixed w/ T-Ray
1993	"Where's It At" (Muggs Remix)	Funkdoobiest	N/A	N/A
1993	"The Program" (Soul Assassins Re-Mix)	David Morales and the Bad Yard Club	N/A	remixed w/ T-Ray
1993	"Under Mi Sleng Teng Remix" (Muggs Old School Remix) /(Soul Assassins Remix)	Wayne Smith	N/A	N/A
1994	"Check It" (Muggs Remix)	Dana Barros	N/A	N/A
1994	"None of Your Business" (Muggs Metal Mix)	Salt-N-Pepa	N/A	N/A
1994	"Bug Powder Dust" (DJ Muggs Remix)	Bomb the Bass and Justin Warfield	N/A	N/A
1994	"Riddimwize" (Remix)	Danny Red	N/A	N/A
1994	"Because of Love (Muggs 7" W/Bass Intro)"	Janet Jackson	N/A	N/A
1995	"Throw Your Set in the Air" (Slow Roll Remix)	Cypress Hill	—N/a	—N/a
1995	"Illusions" (Trumpet Mix) /"Illusions" (Harpsichord Mix)"	Cypress Hill	—N/a	—N/a
1995	"Numb" (The Soul Assassins Mix)	U2	Melon: Remixes for Propaganda	N/A
1995	"Turn" (Muggs Remix)	Super Cat	N/A	N/A
1995	"Knockout Position" (Remix)	Kaliphz	Seven Deadly Sins	also add. producer
1996	"Down 4 Life" (Remix)	Jackers	N/A	N/A
1996	"Who Is He and What Is He to You" (Quiet Storm Mix)	Me'Shell NdegeOcello	N/A	N/A
1996	"Never Never Love" (DJ Muggs Master Mix) /(DJ Muggs Instrumental Mix)	Simply Red	N/A	N/A
1997	"Your Summertime" (DJ Muggs Summer Mix)	Raissa	N/A	N/A
1997	"Digital" (DJ Muggs Remix)	Goldie	N/A	N/A
1999	"Don't Try Suicide" (Remix)	Queen	N/A	N/A
2001	"Merry Blues" (DJ Muggs Remix)	Manu Chao	N/A	N/A
2001	"Freelove" (DJ Muggs Remix)	Depeche Mode	N/A	N/A
2006	"Lyrical Swords" (DJ Muggs Assassin Remix)	GZA and Ras Kass	N/A	N/A
2011	"Catch 22 (Intro)" (DJ Muggs Remix)	Quarashi	Anthology	N/A
2018	"Jump Around" (25 Year Remix)	Everlast, Damian "Jr. Gong" Marley and Meyhem Lauren	N/A	N/A
2023	"Hits from the Bong" (Muggs 2023 Mix)	Cypress Hill	Black Sunday (25 Year Anniversary)	—N/a

== Music videos ==
As solo artist
Year	Album	Title	Director	Other featured artist
1997	Soul Assassins	Third World	n/c	RZA & GZA
2000	The Soul Assassins II	Real Life	n/c	Kool G Rap
2006	Grandmasters	General Principles	n/c	GZA
2012	Bass For Your Face	Snap Ya Neck Back	n/c	Dizzee Rascal, Bambu
2013	Bass For Your Face	Wikid	Matt Maloney	Chuck D, Jared Gomes
2018	Gems From The Equinox	Redrum	The Infamous Oz	Meyhem Lauren
2018	Soul Assassins 2: Dia Del Asesinato	Death Wish	DJ Muggs	MF Doom, Freddie Gibbs
2018	Soul Assassins 2: Dia Del Asesinato	Contagion Theory	n/c	Mach-Hommy
2018	Soul Assassins 2: Dia Del Asesinato	Yacht Party	n/c	Raekwon
2018	Soul Assassins 2: Dia Del Asesinato	Assassination Day	DJ Muggs	MF Doom
2018	Soul Assassins 2: Dia Del Asesinato	Duck Sauce	DJ Muggs The Infamous Oz	ETO
2018	Soul Assassins 2: Dia Del Asesinato	Niggas is Pussy	David Sakolsky	Meyhem Lauren
2018	KAOS	Shit I'm On	The Infamous Oz	Roc Marciano
2018	KAOS	White Dirt	David Sakolsky	Roc Marciano
2018	KAOS	Wormhole	David Sakolsky	Roc Marciano
2018	KAOS	Aunt Bonnie	DJ Muggs	Roc Marciano
2018	KAOS	E Train	David Sakolsky	Roc Marciano
2018	KAOS	Caught A Lick	DJ Muggs	Roc Marciano
2018	Dia Del Asesinato (Diamond Edition)	Balance	n/c	Meyhem Lauren
2019	Hells Roof	Holy Wine	Davis Sakolsky	ETO
2019	Hells Roof	What You Sayin	n/c	ETO
2019	Medallo	Just Because	DJ Muggs	CRIMEAPPLE
2019	Medallo	Crazy Eddie's	DJ Muggs	CRIMEAPPLE
2019	Medallo	En Vivo Desde Manrique	DJ Muggs	CRIMEAPPLE
2019	Members Only	Wavy	Shari Gab	Meyhem Lauren
2019	Members Only	Aztec Snowflakes	Joshua Durham	Meyhem Lauren
2019	Members Only	Blue Chinese	Joshua Durham	Meyhem Lauren
2019	Medallo	22 Blue Twos		CRIMEAPPLE, Primo Profit
2020	Kilogram	Mr. Dynamite	DJ Muggs	Al Divino
2020	Winter	Resume	n/c	Hologram
2020	Kill Devil Hills	Skulls and Guns	Juan Richard Feliz	Ill Bill, Slaine (rapper), Everlast
2021	Dies Occidendum (as DJ Muggs the Black Goat)	Nigrum Mortem	Will Renton	
2021	Death & The Magician	Prayers Over Packages	n/c	Rome Streetz
2021	Death & The Magician	Stone Cold Soul	Estevan Oriol	Rome Streetz
2021	Death & The Magician	Wheel of Fortune	Migz Tatz	Rome Streetz
2021	Death & The Magician	Death & The Magician: The Film	David Sakolsky	Rome Streetz
2021	Death & The Magician	Ace of Swords	n/c	Rome Streetz
2021	Rammellzee	Eating Never Stressing	n/c	Flee Lord
2021	Rammellzee	Rammellzee	DJ Muggs	Flee Lord
2021	Rammellzee	Mansion In The Ghetto	DJ Muggs	Flee Lord, CRIMEAPPLE
2021	Rammellzee	45 In My Pocket	DJ Muggs	Flee Lord
2021	Rammellzee	Future Future: Gothic Gothic - The Rammellzee Profile	DJ Muggs David Sakolsky	Rammellzee, Flee Lord, Ghostface Killah, Roc Marciano, CRIMEAPPLE, T.F, Meyhem Lauren
2021	Holy Ghost	Holy Ghost	David Sakolsky	
2021	Holy Ghost	Savor The Secrets	David Sakolsky	
2021	American Cheese	No Off Season	David Sakolsky	Hologram
2021	American Cheese	American Cheese	David Sakolsky	Hologram
2021	American Cheese	You Know My Name	DJ Muggs	Hologram
2021	American Cheese	Don't Ride With The Drugs	David Sakolsky	Hologram, Action Bronson
2021	American Cheese	Black	David Sakolsky	Hologram
2021	American Cheese	Smoke Weed & Figure Shit Out	David Sakolsky	Hologram
2021	Cartagena	Papas	Media Systems Co.	CRIMEAPPLE
2021	Cartagena	Peligrosisimo	Media Systems Co.	CRIMEAPPLE
2021	Cartagena	Cheap Work	David Sakolsky	CRIMEAPPLE
2021	Cartagena	Grey Skies	Media Systems Co.	CRIMEAPPLE
2021	Cartagena	Tony 2C	DJ Muggs	CRIMEAPPLE
2021	Winter 2	All White Party	DJ Muggs	Meyhem Lauren
2021	Winter 2	Beaming Hi	DJ Muggs	RLX
2022	Gold	Where Ya Soul At	DJ Muggs	Rigz, Mooch
2022	Gold	Heads On The Wall	Isiah.Shot.It	Rigz, Rome Streetz
2022	Gold	Never Met A Real Gangsta	Isiah.Shot.It	Rigz
2022	Gold	The Gold Standard	David Sakolsky	Rigz
2022	Gold	Gold	Phreshvision	Rigz, Mooch
2022	Gold	Every Season	Isiah.Shot.It	Rigz, Rob Gates
2022	Soul Assassins 3: Death Valley	Metropolis	DJ Muggs David Sakolsky	Method Man, Slick Rick
2022	Soul Assassins 3: Death Valley	Street Made	DJ Muggs David Sakolsky	Scarface (rapper), Freddie Gibbs
2022	Sin Cortar	NBA	Estevan Oriol	CRIMEAPPLE
2022	Soul Assassins 3: Death Valley	Check In	DJ Muggs David Sakolsky	Jay Worthy
2022	Sin Cortar	Lucas Y Mónica	DJ Muggs	CRIMEAPPLE
2022	Sin Cortar	Manteca Mambo	n/c	CRIMEAPPLE
2022	Sin Cortar	Asesinos	n/c	CRIMEAPPLE, Sick Jacken
2022	What They Hittin 4	95	New High Filmz	Jay Worthy
2022	What They Hittin 4	The Gentleman	n/c	Jay Worthy
2022	What They Hittin 4	Black Sunday Interlude (Cypress Hill)	Stro	Jay Worthy
2023	What They Hittin 4	The Wine Connoisseur	n/c	Jay Worthy
2023	Champagne For Breakfast	Fresh Out the Water	David Sakolsky	Madlib, Meyhem Layren
2023	Champagne For Breakfast	African Pompano	Giancarlo Lofredo	Madlib, Meyhem Layren
2023	Lofi Punk	Neon Sunburn	David Sakolsky DJ Muggs	8tari Lofi Punk
2023	Champagne For Breakfast	OD Wilson	DJ Muggs	Madlib, Meyhem Lauren
2023	Soul Assassins 3: Death Valley	We Riding We Ain't Hiding	n/c	T.F
2023	Lofi Punk	The Guns of Brixton	David Sakolsky DJ Muggs	8tari Lofi Punk
2023	Champagne For Breakfast	Midnight Silk	Boris	Madlib, Meyhem Lauren
2023	Soul Assassins 3: Death Valley	Jokers Wild	David Sakolsky	CeeLo Green
2023	Baby Pandas	Baby Pandas	David Sakolsky DJ Muggs	8tari Lofi Punk
2023	Champagne For Breakfast	Big Money	Danny Salazar Giancarlo Lofredo	Madlib, Meyhem Lauren
2023	Champagne For Breakfast	Evolution	Giancarlo Lofredo	Madlib, Meyhem Lauren
2023	Soul Assassins 3: Death Valley	We Coming For The Safe	Jason Goldwatch	Boldy James
2023	Yozakura Enclave	Yozakura Enclave	n/c	8tari Lofi Punk
2023	Soul Assassins 3: Death Valley	Ready For War	Jason Goldwatch	Meyhem Lauren
2023	Soul Assassins 3: Death Valley	Skeleton Bones	Jason Goldwatch	Rome Streetz
2023	Soul Assassins 3: Death Valley	Outro	Estevan Oriol	Spanto, Estevan Oriol
2023	Divinity (Original Motion Picture Score)	Divinity 2 Infinity: The Odyssey	Eddie Alcazar	Kool Keith
2024	Death Valley: Original Motion Picture Score	My House	David Sakolsky	CRIMEAPPLE
2024	Roc Star	Trumpets	n/c	Mooch
2024	Roc Star	Mooch Moses	n/c	Mooch
2024	Roc Star	Belly	Isiah.Shot.It	Mooch
2024	Roc Star	It Ain't Ready	n/c	Mooch
2024	Roc Star	Soul Screaming	Cin-ah MATIC Zae	Mooch
2024	Deceptacon	Deceptacon	n/c	8tari Lofi Punk
2024	Roc Star	Uncut Hope	n/c	Mooch
2024	The Eternal Now	The Eternal Now	n/c	Raz Fresco
2024	The Eternal Now	Blow The Spot Up	Raz Fresco	Raz Fresco
2024	Butterfly Effect	Butterfly Effect	n/c	8tari Lofi Punk
2024	The Eternal Now	Look What You Made Me Do	New High Filmz	Raz Fresco
2024	The Eternal Now	World Peace	RX	Raz Fresco
2024	The Eternal Now	Pan's Labyrinth	New High Filmz	Raz Fresco
2024	Ghost Guns	Ghost Guns	Dave Sakolsky	Hologram, Knowledge The Pirate
2024	Los Pollos Hermanos	Smoke & Mirrors	Raz Fresco	Raz Fresco
2024	Los Pollos Hermanos	Na Na Na Na Na	New High Filmz	CRIMEAPPLE, RLX
2024	Los Pollos Hermanos	Spike Lee Joint	New High Filmz	CRIMEAPPLE, RLX
2024	Los Pollos Hermanos	Where The Piff At	Chow Films	RLX
2024	Los Pollos Hermanos	2 To The Chest	Chow Films	RLX
