= Richard Huredia =

American audio engineer

- Occupation: Audio engineer
- Years active: 1991–present
- Awards: Grammy Award for Best Rap Album (2001)

Richard "Segal" Huredia is an American audio engineer from California. He has won a Grammy Award for Best Rap Album in 2001 for his engineering duties on Eminem's The Marshall Mathers LP, which also brought him a nomination for a Grammy Award for Album of the Year. He received his second Grammy Award for Album of the Year nomination for Outkast's Stankonia at the 44th Annual Grammy Awards the following year. He currently works at Paramount Recording. He has worked with established artists like Dr. Dre, Xzibit, Snoop Dogg, Dilated Peoples, DJ Muggs and Pink Grenade to name a few.

== Discography ==
=== 1990s ===
1992

- 1992: Jimmy Cliff – Breakout (mastering assistant)
- 1992: Marion Meadows – Keep It Right There (engineering assistant)
- 1992: Norman Brown – Just Between Us (engineering assistant)

1993

- 1993: B.T.S. featuring Jamiz – Can You Feel It (engineering, mixing, remixing)
- 1993: J. Spencer – Chimera (engineering assistant)
- 1993: Ricky Martin – Me Amaras (mixing assistant)
- 1993: The Party – 七個Happy Party (engineering assistant)
- 1993: Vesta Williams – Everything-N-More (mixing assistant)

1994

- 1994: Ahmad – Ahmad (recording)
- 1994: Ahmad – "That's How It Is" from Jason's Lyric (The Original Motion Picture Soundtrack) (engineering, mixing)
- 1994: Chanté Moore – A Love Supreme (mixing assistant)
- 1994: Damion Hall – Straight to the Point (mixing assistant)
- 1994: Norman Brown – After the Storm (engineering assistant)

1995

- 1995: Aaron Neville – The Tattooed Heart (engineering assistant)
- 1995: Fleetwood Mac – Time (engineering assistant)
- 1995: Green Day – Insomniac (second engineer)
- 1995: Jason Weaver – Love Ambition (recording, mixing)
- 1995: L.A. Boyz – Young Guns (engineering assistant)
- 1995: P – P (additional engineering)
- 1995: Soul Asylum – Let Your Dim Light Shine (second engineer)
- 1995: Terry Evans – Puttin' It Down (engineering assistant)
- 1995: Saturday Morning: Cartoons' Greatest Hits (engineering assistant)
- 1995: The Music Of Disney's Cinderella (recording assistant)
- 1995: David Benoit – "Here There and Everywhere" from (I Got No Kick Against) Modern Jazz (recording assistant)
- 1995: Stevie Nicks – "Somebody Stand By Me" from Boys on the Side (Original Soundtrack Album) (second recording assistant)

1996

- 1996: Az Yet – Az Yet (engineering assistant)
- 1996: Doug Macleod – You Can't Take My Blues (engineering assistant)
- 1996: Joe Cocker – Organic (engineering assistant)
- 1996: Joe Henry – Trampoline (engineering assistant)
- 1996: Imperial Drag – Imperial Drag (mixing assistant)
- 1996: L.A. Boyz – Pure Energy (engineering assistant)
- 1996: Norman Brown – Better Days Ahead (recording assistant)
- 1996: The Brian Setzer Orchestra – Guitar Slinger (engineering assistant)
- 1996: Toni Braxton – Secrets (recording assistant)
- 1996: Tony! Toni! Toné! – House of Music (mixing assistant)
- 1996: Dr. Dre Presents: The Aftermath (recording, mixing)
- 1996: The Craft: Music From the Motion Picture (engineering assistant)

1997

- 1997: L.A. Boyz – 冒險 (recording)
- 1997: Laurneá Wilkerson – "Superstar" from Betta Listen (recording assistant)
- 1997: The Firm – The Album (engineering, recording, mixing)

1998

- 1998: Xzibit – 40 Dayz & 40 Nightz (engineering)
- 1998: Bulworth the Soundtrack (engineering)
- 1998: Matthew Sweet – "Magnet & Steel" from Sabrina The Teenage Witch™ (The Album) (engineering)
- 1998: Ras Kass – "Ghetto Fabulous" from Rasassination (recording)

1999

- 1999: Dr. Dre – 2001 (engineering, mixing, collage photo)
- 1999: Eminem – The Slim Shady LP (engineering, mixing, narrator on "Guilty Conscience")
- 1999: The WhoRidas – High Times (mixing)
- 1999: Next Friday (Original Motion Picture Soundtrack) (engineering, recording, mixing)
- 1999: Dr. Dre & Eminem – "Bad Guys Always Die" from Music Inspired By The Motion Picture Wild Wild West (recording, mixing)

=== 2000s ===
2000

- 2000: Eminem – The Marshall Mathers LP (engineering)
- 2000: Xzibit – Restless (engineering, recording, mixing)
- 2000: Limp Bizkit – "Rollin' (Urban Assault Vehicle)" from Chocolate Starfish and the Hot Dog Flavored Water (mixing)
- 2000: Outkast – "B.O.B." from Stankonia (mixing)
- 2000: Outkast – "Tough Guy" from Music From And Inspired By Shaft (mixing)
- 2000: Xzibit & Jonathan Davis – "Year 2000 (Remix)" from Music from and Inspired by the Motion Picture Black and White (recording, mixing)

2001

- 2001: Aaliyah – Aaliyah (mixing)
- 2001: D12 – Devils Night (mixing)
- 2001: Jay-Z – The Blueprint (mixing)
- 2001: KuЯupt – Space Boogie: Smoke Oddessey (recording, mixing)
- 2001: Nate Dogg – Music & Me (mixing)
- 2001: Outkast – Big Boi and Dre Present... Outkast (mixing)
- 2001: The Wash (The Original Motion Picture Soundtrack) (engineering, mixing)
- 2001: The Golden State Project – "Bounce, Rock, Golden State" from Training Day: The Soundtrack (engineering)

2002

- 2002: Green Day – Shenanigans (additional engineering)
- 2002: Knoc-turn'al – L.A. Confidential presents: Knoc-turn'al (recording, mixing)
- 2002: Royce da 5'9" – Rock City (Version 2.0) (mixing)
- 2002: Snoop Dogg – "Bo$$ Playa" from Paid Tha Cost To Be Da Bo$$ (mixing)
- 2002: Truth Hurts – "Jimmy" from Truthfully Speaking (recording)
- 2002: WC – Ghetto Heisman (mixing)
- 2002: Xzibit – Man vs. Machine (mixing)

2003

- 2003: Defari – Odds & Evens (recording, mixing)
- 2003: DJ Babu – Duck Season Vol. 2 (mixing)
- 2003: Planet Asia – The Grand Opening (mixing)
- 2003: Swollen Members – Heavy (recording, mixing)

2004

- 2004: Dilated Peoples – Neighborhood Watch (recording, mixing)
- 2004: Guerilla Black – Guerilla City (mixing)
- 2004: Knoc-Turn'al – The Way I Am (mixing)
- 2004: Rohff – La Fierté des Nôtres (mixing)
- 2004: The Alchemist – 1st Infantry (mixing)
- 2004: The Federation – Rick Rock Presents Federation: The Album (mixing)
- 2004: Xzibit – Weapons Of Mass Destruction (recording)
- 2004: Method Man – "The Prequel" from Tical 0: The Prequel (mixing)
- 2004: Noelle Scaggs & Dilated Peoples – "The Craft" from DJ Rhettmatic's Exclusive Collection (mixing)
- 2004: Visionaries – "Momentum" from Pangaea (mixing)
- 2004: Ying Yang Twins & Yonnie – "In Da Club" from My Brother & Me (mixing)

2005

- 2005: David Banner – Certified (mixing)
- 2005: Ebony Eyez – 7 Day Cycle (mixing)
- 2005: Proof – Searching for Jerry Garcia (mixing)
- 2005: Kanye West, Malik Yusef, Common & JV – "Wouldn't You Like to Ride" from Coach Carter (Music From The Motion Picture) (mixing)
- 2005: L.A. Symphony – "Timeless" from Disappear Here (mixing)
- 2005: Supernatural – "Top Off" from S.P.I.T.: Spiritual Poetry Ignites Thought (mixing)
- 2005: Trek Life – "Mind Right" from Price I've Paid (mixing)

2006

- 2006: Defari – Street Music (mixing)
- 2006: Diam's – Dans ma bulle (mixing)
- 2006: Dilated Peoples – 20/20 (mixing)
- 2006: DJ Salam Wreck – Trouble Soon (mixing)
- 2006: Mickey Avalon – Mickey Avalon (engineering, mixing)
- 2006: Planet Asia – The Medicine (mixing)
- 2006: Snoop Dogg – Tha Blue Carpet Treatment (mixing)
- 2006: Swollen Members – Black Magic (mixing)
- 2006: Tha Alkaholiks – Firewater (mixing)

2007

- 2007: Dirt Nasty – Dirt Nasty (mixing, mastering)
- 2007: DJ Muggs, Sick Jacken & Cynic – Legend of the Mask and the Assassin (mixing)
- 2007: Hilary Duff – Dignity (mixing)
- 2007: Mala Rodríguez – Malamarismo (mixing)
- 2007: The Soul of John Black – The Good Girl Blues (mixing)
- 2007: Britney Spears – "Ooh Ooh Baby" from Blackout (recording)
- 2007: Evidence – "Hot & Cold" from The Weatherman LP (mixing)

2008

- 2008: Andre Legacy – Andre Legacy (mixing, mastering)
- 2008: DJ Muggs & Planet Asia – Pain Language (mixing)
- 2008: Dyslexic Speedreaders – Shoot To Kill Mixtape (mastering)
- 2008: Medine – Arabian Panther (mixing)
- 2008: Sat l'Artificier – Second Souffle (mixing)
- 2008: Figgkidd – "Love & Understanding" from Figgkidd (mixing)
- 2008: Mac Tyer – "Vroum Vroum" from D'où je viens (mixing)
- 2008: Snoop Dogg – "Staxxx In My Jeans" from Ego Trippin' (mixing)

2009

- 2009: B-Real – Smoke n Mirrors (mixing)
- 2009: Soul Assassins – Soul Assassins: Intermission (mixing)
- 2009: Swollen Members – Armed To The Teeth (mixing)
- 2009: Warren G – The G Files (mixing)

=== 2010s ===
2010

- 2010: Cypress Hill – Rise Up (mixing)
- 2010: DJ Muggs vs Ill Bill – Kill Devil Hills (mixing)
- 2010: Snoop Dogg – More Malice (mixing)

2011

- 2011: Snoop Dogg – Doggumentary (mixing)

2012

- 2012: Aelpéacha – World Ride (recording, presenter)

2014

- 2014: Pink Grenade – Fear Of A Pink Planet (mixing)

2015

- 2015: The Alchemist and Oh No – Welcome To Los Santos (mixing)
- 2015: Anakronic Electro Orkestra & Pigeon John – "All Out" from Spoken Machine (mixing)

2016

- 2016: Ras Kass – Intellectual Property: #SOI2 (mixing)

2019

- 2019: DJ Muggs & Mach-Hommy – Kill Em All (mixing)
- 2019: DJ Muggs & Mach-Hommy – Tuez-Les Tous (additional mixing)
- 2019: Ras Kass – Soul On Ice 2 (mixing)
- 2019: Avicii – "SOS" from Tim (engineering)

=== 2020s ===
2020

- 2020: Ras Kass – "Dough" from I'm Not Clearing Shit (mixing)

2021

- 2021: 21 Savage – Spiral: From the Book of Saw Soundtrack (mixing)
- 2021: Yelawolf & DJ Muggs – Mile 0 (mixing)

2022

- 2022: Ari Lennox – Age/Sex/Location (recording)
- 2022: Crimeapple & DJ Muggs – Sin Cortar (mixing)
- 2022: Jay Worthy & DJ Muggs – What They Hittin 4 (mixing)

2023

- 2023: Madlib, Meyhem Lauren & DJ Muggs – Champagne for Breakfast (mixing)

== Grammy awards and nominations ==
Accolades for Richard Huredia
Year	Nominee / work	Award	Result
2001	The Marshall Mathers LP	Grammy Award for Album of the Year	Nominated
2001	The Marshall Mathers LP	Grammy Award for Best Rap Album	Won
2002	Stankonia	Grammy Award for Album of the Year	Nominated
