= Rob Hill (producer) =

American record producer

- Origin: United States
- Occupations: Record producer, songwriter, Audio engineer
- Website: belowmeproductions.com xmusicstudios.com casadrr.com

Rob Hill is a music producer and engineer as well as a songwriter and musician, based in Los Angeles California.
Rob's production credits include: Everlast (musician), Korn, Soul Assassins, Xzibit, Wu-Tang Clan, Cypress Hill, Queen, Jackson Browne, the Cars, R.E.M., Zayra Alvarez, Northern State, Fuel (band), "Skinhead " Rob Aston, Psycho Realm, Tim Armstrong, Molotov (band), Depswa, Tourettes (band), Transplants (band), and many more...

Rob Hill worked with Elliot Scheiner on a 5.1 remix of the great R.E.M. classic "Document", where he was the digital engineer, and editor. Album includes "End of the World" and "The One I Love". He also worked on the surround remix of the 1st the Cars record "Cars"with hits like "My Best Friend's Girlfriend" and "Just What I Needed" where Rob recaptured the tracks in original producer Roy Thomas Baker's Arizona Studio from his Stevens 40 track 2" tape machine.

Rob has worked with some of the biggest names in music production, e.g. Phil Ramone, Elliot Scheiner, Greg Ladanyi, Frank Fillapetti, Michael Beinhorn, Ed Cherney, etc...

== Discography ==
2002: A Night at the Opera (Queen album) [DTS] by Queen
2002: Untouchables [Bonus DVD] by Korn
2003: Dust by DJ Muggs
2003: Leave the Light On (Beth Hart album) by Beth Hart
2003: Natural Selection by Fuel (band)
2003: Take a Look in the Mirror [Bonus DVD] by Korn
2003: Take a Look in the Mirror [Clean] by Korn
2003: Take a Look in the Mirror by Korn
2004: 1st Infantry (album) [Clean] by The Alchemist (producer)
2004: 1st Infantry (album) by The Alchemist (producer)
2004: All City [Clean] by Northern State (band)
2004: All City by Northern State (band)
2004: Found by Todd Proctor
2004: Greatest Hits, Vol. 1 [Clean] by Korn
2004: Greatest Hits, Vol. 1 by Korn
2004: Ruleta [2004] by Zayra Alvarez
2004: Till Death Do Us Part (Cypress Hill album) [Clean] by Cypress Hill
2004: Till Death Do Us Part (Cypress Hill album) by Cypress Hill
2004: What's Your Number? [CD 2] by Cypress Hill
2004: White Trash Beautiful [Import CD] by Everlast (musician)
2004: White Trash Beautiful by Everlast (musician)
2005: 1st Infantry (album) [Deluxe] by The Alchemist (producer)
2005: 1st Infantry (album) [Instrumental] by The Alchemist (producer)
2005: Grandmasters (album) by DJ Muggs/GZA the Genius
2005: Greatest Hits from the Bong [Clean] by Cypress Hill
2005: Greatest Hits from the Bong by Cypress Hill
2005: A Night at the Opera (Queen album)[30th Anniversary CD/DVD] by Queen (band)
2005: Running on Empty (album) [Expanded Edition] by Jackson Browne
2005: S.P.I.T. by Supernatural
2005: Urban Survival Syndrome by Mitchy Slick
2006: Grandmasters (album): Instrumentals by DJ Muggs/GZA the Genius
2006: Ruleta [2006] by Zayra Alvarez
2007: Grandmasters (album) Remix by DJ Muggs/GZA
2007: Treason Songs by Tourettes (band)
2008: Alienigma [Bonus Track] by Agent Steel
2008: Etched in Blood by The Dreaming
2011: Kiss of Death by Mignon (musician)
2012: Na Chasti by Lumen (band)
2012: Beast For Love by Dance Hall Pimps (band)
