= Kill Devil Hill =

Kill Devil Hill or similar, may refer to:

- Kill Devil Hills, North Carolina, a town in Dare County, North Carolina, United States
  - Wright Brothers National Memorial, an American historic site
- Kill Devil Hill (band), an American heavy metal band
- The Kill Devil Hills, an Australian rock band
- Kill Devil Hills (album), a hip hop music album by DJ Muggs and Ill Bill
