= The Psycho Realm =

Studio album by Psycho Realm
- Released: October 28, 1997
- Recorded: 1996–97
- Studios: The Hill (Los Angeles, CA); Larrabee Sound Studios (Los Angeles, CA); Ameraycan Studios (Los Angeles, CA)
- Genre: Hardcore hip hop
- Length: 57:33
- Labels: Ruffhouse; Columbia
- Producers: B-Real; Sick Jacken; The Psycho Ward; TRT; Joe "The Butcher" Nicolo (co.)

Psycho Realm chronology
The Psycho Realm (1997)	A War Story Book I (1999)

Singles from The Psycho Realm
- 1. "Psycho City Blocks" Released: July 1997; 2. "Stone Garden" Released: November 25, 1997

Professional ratings
Review scores
Source	Rating
AllMusic	4/5 stars
Entertainment Weekly	B
NME	7/10

The Psycho Realm is the debut studio album by American hip hop group Psycho Realm. It was released on October 28, 1997, via Ruffhouse/Columbia Records. The recording sessions took place at The Hill, Ameraycan Studios, and Larrabee Sound Studios, in Los Angeles. The production was handled by members Sick Jacken and B-Real, as well as by the Psycho Ward and TRT.

The album debuted at number 183 on the Billboard 200, number 68 on the Top R&B Albums and number 13 on the Heatseekers Albums chart in the United States. It featured two singles: "Stone Garden" and "Psycho City Blocks".

== Track listing ==
No.	Title	Writer(s)	Producer(s)	Length
1.	"Psycho City Blocks/Psycho Interlude"	Gustavo Gonzalez; Joaquín Gonzalez; Louis Freese	Sick Jacken; B-Real (co.)	4:51
2.	"Showdown"	G. Gonzalez; J. Gonzalez; Freese; John Stepan Zamecnik; Harry D. Kerr	Sick Jacken; B-Real (co.)	4:32
3.	"The Big Payback"	G. Gonzalez; J. Gonzalez	The Psycho Ward; Sick Jacken (add.)	3:32
4.	"Premonitions"	G. Gonzalez; Freese	TRT	2:39
5.	"Interlude/Stone Garden/Interlude"	G. Gonzalez; J. Gonzalez; Freese	Sick Jacken; B-Real (co.)	5:11
6.	"Temporary Insanity"	G. Gonzalez; J. Gonzalez; Freese; Theodora Morse; Ferde Grofé; Harry Sukman; Marshall Neilan; Paul Whiteman	The Psycho Ward; Sick Jacken (add.)	3:51
7.	"Doors Intro/Confessions of a Drug Addict"	G. Gonzalez; J. Gonzalez; Freese; Peter Lewis	B-Real; Sick Jacken	4:06
8.	"Who Are You Interlude/Bullets"	G. Gonzalez; J. Gonzalez; Freese	B-Real; Sick Jacken	5:07
9.	"Love Letters Intro/Love from the Sick Side"	G. Gonzalez; J. Gonzalez; Freese	The Psycho Ward; Sick Jacken (add.)	3:17
10.	"R.U. Experienced/Outro"	G. Gonzalez; J. Gonzalez; Freese	Sick Jacken; B-Real (co.); Joe "The Butcher" Nicolo (co.)	4:28
11.	"Psyclones"	G. Gonzalez; J. Gonzalez; Freese	Sick Jacken; B-Real	3:23
12.	"Lost Cities"	G. Gonzalez; J. Gonzalez; Freese	B-Real; Sick Jacken	4:43
13.	"La Conecta Intro/La Conecta (Pt. 1)"	G. Gonzalez; J. Gonzalez; Freese	The Psycho Ward; Sick Jacken (add.)	4:12
14.	"La Conecta (Pt. 2)/Goin' In Circles Outro"	G. Gonzalez; J. Gonzalez; Freese	Sick Jacken; B-Real (add.)	3:50
Total length:				57:33

== Personnel ==
- Gustavo "Big Duke" Gonzalez – lyrics, vocals, mixing (track 6)
- Joaquin "Sick Jacken" Gonzalez – lyrics (tracks: 1–3, 5–14), vocals, producer (tracks: 1–2, 5, 7, 8, 10–12, 14), additional producer (tracks: 3, 6, 9, 13), mixing (tracks: 3, 6, 8, 11, 12)
- Louis "B-Real" Freese – lyrics (tracks: 1–2, 4–14), vocals, producer (tracks: 7, 8, 11, 12), co-producer (tracks: 1, 2, 5, 10), mixing (tracks: 1, 2, 5, 7–14)
- Eric "Bobo" Correa – additional vocals (tracks: 13, 14), percussion (tracks: 2, 6, 8, 10), keyboards (tracks: 3, 8), bass & mixing (track 8)
- Randy Craig Kantor – keyboards, mellotron
- Jay Turner – scratches (tracks: 1, 7, 9), producer (track 4)
- Joseph "DJ Jazz" Alexander – scratches (track 1)
- Jason Roberts – bass (track 5), recording
- Joseph Mario Nicolo – co-producer (track 10), mixing (tracks: 1, 2, 5, 7, 9–11, 13, 14)
- Phil Nicolo – mixing (tracks: 3, 6)
- Lawrence "DJ Muggs" Muggerud – mixing (track 4)
- Robert "Taj" Walton – additional mixing
- Eric Janko – recording
- Ross Donaldson – recording
- Steve Baughman – recording
- Manny Lecuona – mastering
- Estevan Oriol – cover photo
- Mark "Mister Cartoon" Machado – logo design

== Charts ==
Chart (1997)	Peak position
US Billboard 200	183
US Top R&B Albums (Billboard)	68
US Heatseekers Albums (Billboard)	13
