= All in Together Now =

All in Together Now may refer to:

- All in Together Now Crew, the predecessor of the Wu-Tang Clan
- "All in Together Now", a song by Ol' Dirty Bastard on the album Nigga Please
- "All in Together Now", a song by DJ Muggs and GZA on the album Grandmasters
