= What's Your Number =

What's Your Number may refer to:

- "What's Your Number?" (song), a 2004 single by Cypress Hill
- What's Your Number?, a 2011 American comedy film
