= A War Story Book I =

Studio album by Psycho Realm
- Released: October 3, 2000
- Recorded: 1998
- Studio: Mennolab Studios (Los Angeles, CA)
- Length: 55:34
- Label: Sick Symphonies
- Producer: Psycho Realm

Psycho Realm chronology
The Psycho Realm (1997)	A War Story Book I (2000)	A War Story Book II (2003)

Professional ratings
Review scores
Source	Rating
Allmusic	1.5/5 stars

A War Story Book I is the second studio album by American hip hop group Psycho Realm. Unlike their first album this was released under their own Sick Symphonies label. This CD only contains one song with B-Real, unlike their first CD where B-Real was on most of the songs. This was due to his commitment to Cypress Hill and was no longer able to collaborate with the Psycho Realm. On this album they only have two featured guests: Crow from the Street Platoon and of course B-Real on "Show Of Force".

== Track listing ==
No.	Title	Length
1.	"The Crazy Area"	5:14
2.	"Order Through Chaos"	4:56
3.	"Pico-Union District"	2:43
4.	"Enemy of the State"	4:00
5.	"Conspiracy Theories"	4:10
6.	"Tragedy.com"	4:28
7.	"Earthquake Weather" (featuring Crow)	6:28
8.	"The Wind of Revolution" (featuring Crow)	3:01
9.	"Moving Through Streets"	3:25
10.	"Street Platoons"	5:22
11.	"Sick Dogs"	6:10
12.	"Show of Force"	5:32
Total length:		55:34

== Personnel ==
- Joaquin Gonzalez - vocals, producer, mixing
- Gustavo Gonzalez - vocals (tracks: 1–2, 4–11), producer
- Louis Freese - vocals (track 12), producer
- Carlos Vargas - vocals (tracks: 7–8), co-producer (tracks: 7–8)
- Menno - additional vocals, guitar, keyboards
- Eric Lance Correa - percussion
- Jay Turner - scratches
- David Cheppa - mastering
- Joe Warlick - mixing
