= Dust (DJ Muggs album) =

Studio album by Muggs
- Released: March 11, 2003
- Genres: Trip hop; electronica; psychedelic rock
- Length: 47:43
- Label: ANTI-
- Producer: DJ Muggs

DJ Muggs chronology
Dust (2003)	Bass for Your Face (2013)

Professional ratings
Aggregate scores
Source	Rating
Metacritic	67/100
Review scores
Source	Rating
AllMusic	4.5/5 stars
Alternative Press	3/5
Blender	3/5 stars
The Guardian	4/5 stars
Mojo	4/5 stars
Pitchfork	1.1/10
Q	4/5 stars
Rolling Stone	3/5 stars
Uncut	3/5 stars
Vibe	3/5

Dust is the debut studio album by American music producer and Cypress Hill member DJ Muggs, credited as Muggs. The album was released by ANTI- on March 11, 2003. A stylistic departure from his previous work, Dust saw Muggs exploring a sound rooted in trip hop and electronica. The album features vocals by Josh Todd of Buckcherry, Greg Dulli of The Afghan Whigs and The Twilight Singers, Amy Trujillo, and Everlast.

Dust was re-released by ANTI-'s sister label Epitaph Records on May 8, 2007.

== Singles ==
"Rain" and "Morta" were the album's first singles, being released before any other songs on the album through either download sites such as CNet's "music.download.com" or compilation albums such as "Anti-spring." (ANTI- Records, 2003)

== Track listing ==
No.	Title	Length
1.	"I Know"	4:46
2.	"Rain" (featuring Josh Todd)	5:05
3.	"Niente"	1:51
4.	"Morta"	3:10
5.	"Faded" (featuring Josh Todd)	4:01
6.	"Chasing Shadows"	1:32
7.	"Tears"	3:46
8.	"Cloudy Days"	1:51
9.	"Fat City" (featuring Greg Dulli)	3:55
10.	"Believer"	3:16
11.	"Gone for Good" (featuring Everlast)	4:04
12.	"Blip"	1:23
13.	"Dead Flowers"	3:48
14.	"Far Away"	5:05
Total length:		47:43

Notes

- Track 9 is a cover song of "Fat City (Slight Return)" by the Twilight Singers (2003)
- Track 11 contents elements of "The Sorcerer of Isis (The Ritual of the Mole)" by Power of Zeus (1970)

== Personnel ==
- Lawrence Muggerud – guitar, drums, keyboards, programming, drum programming
- Amy Trujillo – vocals
- Erik Francis Schrody – vocals
- Greg Dulli – vocals
- Joshua Todd Gruber – vocals
- Mike Sims – bass, guitar
- Paula Gallitano – strings
- Reggie Stewart – bass, guitar, piano
- Scott Abels – drums
- Rob Hill – mixing
- Brian Gardner – mastering
- Estevan Oriol – design
- Mark Machado – design
- Sonny Gerasimowicz – design
- Stephanie Chao – photography

== Charts ==
Chart (2003)	Peak position
French Albums (SNEP)	134
