= A War Story Book II =

Studio album by Psycho Realm
- Released: November 16, 2003
- Recorded: 1998–2003
- Studio: Ayaic Studios
- Length: 69:51
- Label: Sick Symphonies
- Producer: Psycho Realm

Psycho Realm chronology
A War Story Book I (1999)	A War Story Book II (2003)	Psycho Realm Presents El Chavo Y El Ferruco (2005)

A War Story Book II is the third studio album by American hip hop group Psycho Realm, and possibly their final album due to Duke's paralyzation. Although Duke was paralyzed when the album was released, they had about half of the album finished before Duke was shot. Their former bandmate B-Real was not featured on any of the songs. Crow and Cynic from the Street Platoon are the only guests on this record.

== Track listing ==
No.	Title	Length
1.	"Street Terrorism"	4:46
2.	"The Enemy Strikes Back"	6:35
3.	"Wasted"	2:17
4.	"The Killing Fields" (featuring Crow and Cynic)	5:45
5.	"Art Of Execution"	3:58
6.	"Palace Of Exile"	3:46
7.	"First Day Of Freedom"	3:58
8.	"Poison Rituals"	7:01
9.	"Unknown Soldier"	4:26
10.	"Soul Sacrifice"	3:16
11.	"Dysfunctional"	4:54
12.	"Good Times"	4:56
13.	"Lifestyle"	4:41
14.	"Concrete Jungles" (featuring Crow)	3:48
15.	"Gun Control" (featuring Cynic)	5:37
Total length:		1:09:44

== Personnel ==
- Joaquin Gonzalez - vocals, producer, mastering, mixing
- Gustavo Gonzalez - vocals, producer
- Carlos Vargas - vocals (tracks: 4, 14)
- Richard Alfaro - vocals (tracks: 4, 15)
- Jim Muse - additional vocals (track 13)
- Menno - backing vocals, guitar, keyboards, mastering, mixing, recording
- Eric Lance Correa - percussion
- Jay Turner - scratches
- Jose 'Chico' Obregon - additional producer (track 5)
