= Bong hits =

Bong hits may refer to:

- Smoking a bong
- Bong Hits 4 Jesus, the court case allowing schools to suppress drug speech
- Greatest Hits from the Bong by Cypress Hill
