= What's Your Number? (song) =

Single by Cypress Hill featuring Tim Armstrong

from the album Till Death Do Us Part
- Released: March 19, 2004
- Recorded: 2004
- Genre: Alternative hip hop
- Length: 3:32
- Label: Ruffhouse; Columbia Records
- Songwriters: Louis Freese, Lawrence Muggerud, Paul Simonon
- Producers: DJ Muggs; Paul Simonon

Cypress Hill featuring Tim Armstrong singles chronology
"Lowrider" (2002)	"What's Your Number?" (2004)	"Latin Thugs" (2004)

Music video
- "What's Your Number?" on YouTube

"What's Your Number?" is a single by the American hip hop group Cypress Hill featuring Tim Armstrong. It was released in 2004 and featured a rerecorded bassline from "The Guns of Brixton" by The Clash.

== Video ==
The music video for the song was directed by Dean Karr and had guest appearances from Slash, Everlast, Tim Armstrong, Travis Barker, Skinhead Rob, Nadja Peulen, Xzibit, Gary Dourdan, Fredwreck and Wilmer Valderrama and Bobby Alt of Street Drum Corps

== Chart performance ==
"What's Your Number?" reached number 8 in the RIANZ charts, the group's fourth top 10 in New Zealand. At that time it was the group's second song to chart in the US Modern Rock chart, peaking at number No. 23.

== Charts ==
Chart (2004)	Peak position
Australia (ARIA Charts)	56
Belgium (Ultratip Bubbling Under Flanders)	10
Germany (GfK)	41
Italy (FIMI)	33
Netherlands (Single Top 100)	84
New Zealand (Recorded Music NZ)	8
Scotland Singles (OCC)	46
Switzerland (Schweizer Hitparade)	42
UK Hip Hop/R&B (OCC)	11
UK Singles (OCC)	44
US Alternative Airplay (Billboard)	23

== Release history ==
Region	Date	Format(s)	Label(s)	Ref.
United States	February 17, 2004	Alternative · rhythmic contemporary radio	Ruffhouse, Columbia	
