= Soul Assassins: Intermission =

Intermission

Studio album by Soul Assassins
- Released: June 23, 2009
- Studio: The Soul Assassins Compound
- Genre: Hip-hop
- Length: 49:56
- Label: Gold Dust Media
- Producer: DJ Muggs (also exec.); Alchemist; Cynic; DJ Khalil; DJ Solo; G Rocka

Soul Assassins chronology
Muggs Presents Soul Assassins II (2000)	Intermission (2009)	Dia del Asesinato (2018)

Singles from Intermission
- 1. "Gangsta Shit" Released: May 19, 2009

Professional ratings
Review scores
Source	Rating
AllMusic	3/5 stars
HipHopDX	3/5
RapReviews	7.5/10
Spin	5/10 marks

DJ Muggs Presents: Soul Assassins – Intermission is the third studio album by American hip-hop collective Soul Assassins. It was released on June 23, 2009, via Gold Dust Media. Recording sessions took place at the Soul Assassins Compound. Production was handled by DJ Muggs, G. Rocka, Cynic, The Alchemist, DJ Khalil and DJ Solo. It features contributions from Bun B, M-1, Sick Jacken, Evidence, Self Scientific, La Coka Nostra, Necro, Reef the Lost Cauze, OuterSpace, RZA, Reverend William Burke, Planet Asia, B-Real, Prodigy, Twin Gambino, Fashawn, Cynic, Krondon, Dust, Young De, Xzibit and Mykestro.

== Track listing ==
No.	Title	Writer(s)	Producer(s)	Length
1.	"Gangsta Shit"	Bernard Freeman; Lavonne Alford; Lawrence Muggerud	DJ Muggs	2:46
2.	"Classical"	Joaquin Gonzalez; Michael Perretta; Alan Maman	The Alchemist	3:05
3.	"Gunshots"	Aaron Johnson; Maman	The Alchemist	2:59
4.	"Do It"	Erik Schrody; William Braunstein; George Carroll; Dave Abrams	DJ Solo	3:30
5.	"Rep Yo Shit"	Gonzalez; Ron Raphael Braunstein; Muggerud	DJ Muggs	3:02
6.	"Good Evening LA"	Aaron Johnson; Khalil Abdul-Rahman	DJ Khalil	3:09
7.	"Meet Your Maker"	Sharif Lacey; Mario Collazo; Marcus Albaladejo; Richard Alfaro	Cynic	3:54
8.	"Intermission"	Robert Diggs; W. Hudson; Jason Green; Louis Freese; Gonzalo Estrada; Muggerud	G. Rocka	2:31
9.	"Champions (Remix)"	Albert Johnson; Jamal Abdulraheem; Muggerud; Estrada	DJ Muggs	2:53
10.	"Let Go (My Life)"	Santiago Leyva; Muggerud; Abdul-Rahman	DJ Muggs; DJ Khalil	2:53
11.	"Like That Y'All"	Green; Estrada; Muggerud	G. Rocka	3:07
12.	"World We're In"	Alfaro	Cynic	4:25
13.	"Call It Like I See It"	Aaron Johnson; Marvin Jones; Muggerud	DJ Muggs	3:36
14.	"Match Box"	Amy Trujillo; Muggerud	DJ Muggs	4:07
15.	"Figure It Out"	Demerick Ferm; Alvin Joiner; Michael Gilliam; Estrada	G. Rocka	4:27
Total length:				49:56

== Personnel ==
- Larry "Muggs" Muggerud – arranger, producer (tracks: 1, 5, 9, 10, 13, 14), executive producer
- Gonzalo "G-Rocka" Estrada – drum programming (track 1), remixing (track 9), producer (tracks: 8, 11, 15)
- Alan "Alchemist" Maman – producer (tracks: 2, 3)
- Steve Ferlazzo – keyboards (tracks: 1, 9)
- Dave "DJ Solo" Abrams – keyboards (track 1), producer (track 4), scratches (track 9), cover
- "DJ Khalil" Abdul-Rahman – producer (tracks: 6, 10)
- Richard "Cynic" Alfaro – producer (tracks: 7, 12)
- Ernesto "Ern Dog" Medina – recording
- Richard "Segal" Huredia – mixing
- Rod "King Tech" Sepand – mastering
- Tone Lopez – A&R
