= Heavy Metal Kings (album) =

Studio album by Heavy Metal Kings
- Released: April 5, 2011
- Genre: Hip-hop
- Labels: Enemy Soil; Uncle Howie
- Producers: C-Lance; DJ Muggs; Gemcrates; Grand Finale; Ill Bill; Jack of All Trades; Junior Makhno; Shuko; Sicknature; Vherbal

Heavy Metal Kings chronology
Heavy Metal Kings (2011)	Black God White Devil (2017)

Ill Bill chronology
Kill Devil Hills (2010)	Heavy Metal Kings (2011)	The Grimy Awards (2013)

Vinnie Paz chronology
Season of the Assassin (2010)	Heavy Metal Kings (2011)	God of the Serengeti (2012)

Professional ratings
Review scores
Source	Rating
HipHopDX	3/5
RapReviews	7.5/10

Heavy Metal Kings is the self-titled debut studio album by American underground hip hop duo Heavy Metal Kings. It was released on April 5, 2011, by Enemy Soil Entertainment and Uncle Howie Records. Production was handled by C-Lance, Jack of All Trades, DJ Muggs, Gemcrates, Grand Finale, Junior Makhno, Shuko, Sicknature, Vherbal and Ill Bill. It features guest appearances from Crypt the Warchild, Q-Unique, Reef the Lost Cauze, Sabac Red and Slaine.

== Track listing ==
No.	Title	Writer(s)	Producer(s)	Length
1.	"Keeper of the Seven Keys"	William Braunstein; Vincenzo Luvineri; Craig Lanciani	C-Lance	3:03
2.	"Eye Is the King"	Braunstein; Luvineri; Junior Makhno	Junior Makhno	3:02
3.	"Impaled Nazarene"	Braunstein; Luvineri; B. Miklos	Grand Finale	3:05
4.	"Children of God"	Braunstein; Luvineri	Ill Bill	2:49
5.	"Blood Meridian"	Braunstein; Luvineri; J. Ladd	Gemcrates	2:45
6.	"Oath of the Goat"	Braunstein; Luvineri; Kevin Elliott	Vherbal	3:15
7.	"King Diamond"	Braunstein; Luvineri	Ill Bill	3:10
8.	"The Vice of Killing" (featuring Reef the Lost Cauze and Sabac Red)	Braunstein; Luvineri; Sharif Lacey; John Fuentes; Jeppe Andersen	Sicknature	5:06
9.	"Devil's Rebels" (featuring Crypt the Warchild)	Braunstein; Luvineri; Marcus Albaladejo; Christoph Bauss	Shuko	3:25
10.	"Age of Quarrel"	Braunstein; Luvineri; Jim Heffernan	Jack of All Trades	2:38
11.	"Metal in Your Mouth" (featuring Q-Unique and Slaine)	Braunstein; Luvineri; Anthony Quiles; George Carroll; Heffernan	Jack of All Trades	2:45
12.	"Terror Network"	Braunstein; Luvineri; Lanciani	C-Lance	2:55
13.	"Leviathan (The Spell of Kingu)"	Braunstein; Luvineri; Lawrence Muggerud	DJ Muggs	3:06
14.	"The Crown Is Mine"	Braunstein; Luvineri; Lanciani	C-Lance	3:17
15.	"Splatterfest"	Braunstein; Luvineri; Lanciani	C-Lance	2:57
16.	"The Final Call"	Braunstein; Luvineri	Ill Bill	3:26
Total length:				50:44

iTunes version bonus track
No.	Title	Writer(s)	Producer	Length
17.	"Blood Meridian (Ill Bill Remix)"	Braunstein; Luvineri	Ill Bill	3:02

Napster version bonus track
No.	Title	Writer(s)	Producer	Length
18.	"Santa Sangre"	Braunstein; Luvineri	DJ Lethal	3:02

== Charts ==
Chart (2011)	Peak position
Swiss Albums (Schweizer Hitparade)	95
US Top R&B/Hip-Hop Albums (Billboard)	48
US Top Rap Albums (Billboard)	24
US Independent Albums (Billboard)	50
US Heatseekers Albums (Billboard)	7
