= Grandmasters (album) =

Studio album by DJ Muggs vs GZA
- Released: October 25, 2005
- Recorded: 2005
- Studios: S.A. Recording (Los Angeles, CA)
- Genre: Hip-hop
- Length: 43:46
- Label: Angeles Records
- Producer: DJ Muggs

DJ Muggs chronology
Dust (2003)	Grandmasters (2005)	Legend of the Mask and the Assassin (2007)

GZA chronology
Legend of the Liquid Sword (2002)	Grandmasters (2005)	Pro Tools (2008)

Professional ratings
Review scores
Source	Rating
AllMusic	4.5/5 stars
Cokemachineglow	87%
HipHopDX	4/5
laut.de	3/5 stars
Prefix	9/10
RapReviews	8.5/10
Robert Christgau	(2-star Honorable Mention)
Stylus	B

Grandmasters is a collaborative studio album by American Los Angeles–based record producer DJ Muggs and New York–based rapper GZA. It was released on October 25, 2005, via Angeles Records, serving as Muggs' first in his "DJ Muggs vs." series and GZA's fifth album. Produced entirely by Muggs, it features fellow Wu-Tang Clan members and affiliates Raekwon, RZA, Masta Killa and Prodigal Sunn, as well as Cypress Hill's Sen Dog. The project has a theme of chess as can be seen by the names of the tracks, and the album itself. Introductions featuring chess strategy, including instruction for a chess opening using algebraic notation, are within the album. The album was also released in 'Instrumentals' and 'Remix' versions. The latter containing a bonus DVD featuring world tour and studio footage.

== Background ==
Chess is the ultimate board game. Monopoly is not in its league and Checkers doesn't compare at all. It's civilized war. It's a mathematical thing, its science, and it's strategy. That's life all the time. Just planning your day, being ten steps ahead and seeing the moves ahead. That's what chess is about. I'm not the greatest player. I'm not a master or a grandmaster. I lose a lot, but I learn. I've been defeated plenty times. I play online and I might have 900 wins and 850 losses but I play all the time. The game is fascinating and I am captivated by that. The album I just dropped is called Grandmasters. That's the highest level you reach when playing chess and it's also the highest level of emceeing, producing and deejaying. Most of the titles are chess slang 'Queen's Gambit', 'Destruction of a Guard', 'Unprotected Pieces', and 'Illusory Protection'. I incorporate chess into certain rhymes. I use chess all the time. Chess is a big part of what I do.

— GZA

== Track listing ==
All music is composed by DJ Muggs.

No.	Title	Length
1.	"Opening"	1:34
2.	"Those That's Bout It"	3:24
3.	"Destruction of a Guard" (featuring Raekwon)	3:59
4.	"Exploitation of Mistakes"	3:21
5.	"General Principles"	3:39
6.	"Advance Pawns" (featuring RZA, Raekwon and Sen Dog)	4:02
7.	"Queen's Gambit"	4:35
8.	"All in Together Now" (featuring RZA)	4:24
9.	"Unstoppable Threats" (featuring Masta Killa and Prodigal Sunn)	3:44
10.	"Unprotected Pieces"	3:29
11.	"Illusory Protection"	4:27
12.	"Smothered Mate"	3:12
Total length:		43:46

== Personnel ==
- Gary Grice – main artist, vocals
- Lawrence Muggerud – main artist, keyboards (track 3), producer
- Corey Woods – featured artist (tracks: 3, 6)
- Robert Diggs – featured artist (tracks: 6, 8)
- Senen Reyes – featured artist (track 6)
- Elgin Turner – featured artist (track 9)
- Vergil Ruff – featured artist (track 9)
- Dina Nadezhdina – voice (spoken word interludes)
- Ina Williams – backing vocals (track 7)
- Mike "Crazy Neck" Sims – guitar (tracks: 2, 12), piano (tracks: 4, 7), bass (tracks: 10, 11), keyboards (tracks: 10, 12)
- Daniel Seeff – bass (tracks: 2, 6, 7, 9)
- Rob Hill – guitar & strings (track 3), mixing
- Dontae Winslow – trumpet (track 7)
- Ernesto "Ern Dog" Medina – guitar (track 11), bass & organ (track 12), assistant engineering
- Joe "The Butcher" Nicolo – mixing
- Tyler Nicolo – assistant mixing
- DJ SPR4 – recording, assistant mixing
- Brian "Big Bass" Gardner – mastering
- Mike "Fatoe" Orduña – art direction, design
- Joey Castillo Jr. – art direction, design
- Robert Johnson III – photography

== Charts ==
Chart (2005)	Peak position
US Billboard 200	180
US Top R&B/Hip-Hop Albums (Billboard)	69
US Independent Albums (Billboard)	12
