= Bass for Your Face =

Studio album by DJ Muggs
- Released: January 15, 2013 (US)
- Recorded: 2011–12
- Genres: Hip-hop; dubstep; drum and bass
- Length: 46:46
- Label: Ultra
- Producer: DJ Muggs

DJ Muggs chronology
| Dust (2003) | Bass for Your Face (2013) |

Singles from Bass for Your Face
- 1. "Wikid" Released: June 21, 2012

Professional ratings
Review scores
| Source | Rating |
|---|---|
| Drowned in Sound | 7/10 |

Bass for Your Face is the second studio album by American hip-hop producer and recording artist DJ Muggs. The album was released by Ultra Records on January 15, 2013, in the United States.

== Background ==
Given Muggs’ roots in the rap scene, the January release of Bass for Your Face on dance super-label Ultra Records was a marked change in direction. The album does offer loads of low-end and sonic exploration for Muggs. The album meshes sounds from dubstep, glitch, trap and hip-hop into a coherent whole.

I get tired of making the same record over and over,” – DJ Muggs told CODE. “So for me, this is just experimenting with sounds. I cleaned my musical palate and learned.

== Promotion ==
Muggs recorded material for the album with American and British artists and also with Finnish singer Romy Harmony. In January 2012, Muggs dropped a video for "Snap Ya Neck Back" featuring UK rapper Dizzee Rascal, Los Angeles-based MC Bambu and starring his Cypress Hill bandmate B-Real. The first song released from the album was "Wicked", which features Public Enemy's hip-hop veteran Chuck D and rap rock (həd) p.e.'s vocalist Jahred. Muggs enlisted the help of directors Andrew Kline and Eric Thompson of PushOneStop to create the futuristic landscape for the "Soundclash Business" video, released on February 28, 2013. Muggs released his video for "Safe from Harm" featuring British singer Belle Humble on August 20, 2013. There are two versions of the song in the album.

== Track listing ==
| No. | Title | Length |
|---|---|---|
| 1. | "Trap Assassin" (featuring Freddie Gibbs) | 2:54 |
| 2. | "Soundclash Business" | 4:45 |
| 3. | "Deep Purple" | 3:15 |
| 4. | "Shotta" (featuring Rahzel) | 5:35 |
| 5. | "Come On London" (featuring Killa P) | 4:30 |
| 6. | "Safe" (featuring Belle Humble) | 5:50 |
| 7. | "Absolem" (featuring Roc Marciano) | 3:54 |
| 8. | "Snap Ya Neck Back" (featuring Bambu and Dizzee Rascal) | 4:05 |
| 9. | "Unknown" (featuring RomyHarmony) | 3:40 |
| 10. | "Wikid" (featuring Chuck D and Jared) | 3:45 |
| 11. | "Safe" (featuring Belle Humble) | 4:33 |

† On some versions of the CD the fourth track is renamed "Shotta (Itchy Robot Remix)"

== Personnel ==
- Bambu – rap vocals
- Belle Humble – vocals
- Carlton Douglas Ridenhour – rap vocals
- Dylan Kwabana Mills – rap vocals
- Fredrick Tipton – rap vocals
- Lawrence Muggerud – primary artist, producer, vocals
- Patrick Knight – rap vocals
- Paulo Sergio Gomes – vocals
- Rahzel M. Brown – vocals
- Rakeem Calief Myer – rap vocals
- Romy Harmony – vocals
