= Tuez-Les Tous =

Studio album by DJ Muggs and Mach-Hommy
- Released: March 29, 2019
- Genre: Hip-hop
- Length: 30:30
- Label: Soul Assassins
- Producer: DJ Muggs

DJ Muggs and Mach-Hommy chronology
Tuez-Les Tous (2019)	Kill Em All (2019)

Mach-Hommy chronology
Notorious Dump Legends (2018)	Tuez-Les Tous (2019)	Wap Konn Jòj! (2019)

DJ Muggs chronology
Hells Roof (2019)	Tuez-Les Tous (2019)	Medallo (2019)

Singles from Tuez-Les Tous
- 1. "900K" Released: March 15, 2019

Professional ratings
Review scores
Source	Rating
The Irish Times	3/5 stars
Mojo	4/5 stars
RapReviews	7.5/10
Pitchfork	7.6/10
The 405	85/100

Tuez-Les Tous is the first collaborative full-length album by American hip-hop producer DJ Muggs and Haitian rapper Mach-Hommy. It was released on March 29, 2019 via Soul Assassins Records. Produced entirely by Muggs, it features guest appearances from Tha God Fahim, Big Cheeko, Kungg Fuu, Meyhem Lauren and Your Old Droog. The title translates to “Kill Them All” in English.

== Critical reception ==
Tuez-Les Tous was met with generally favorable reviews from music critics. At Metacritic, which assigns a normalized rating out of 100 to reviews from mainstream publications, the album received an average score of 83. The 405 reviewer wrote, "it's great when made with the intention to connect to an audience and bring forth the power of all kinds of voices. And you can't put a price on that". Mojo's critic wrote, "Peak-form Cypress Hill producer DJ Muggs unearths his darkest dungeon beats for imposingly confident New Jersey MC Mach-Hommy on a set of vivid, cold-hearted street raps. Meticulous and brutal". Paul A. Thompson of Pitchfork wrote, "So Hommy, whose work is rich with its connection to Haitian social and political history, and who seems to be in conversation with other artists long dead, is daring you to engage with it as craft before anything else, to marvel at the couplets before decoding them. It makes his music feel coolly, entrancingly mercenary".

=== Accolades ===
Publication	List	Rank	Ref.
Passion of the Weiss	The POW Best Albums 2019	23	

== Track listing ==
All tracks are written by Mach-Hommy and Lawrence Muggerud; additional writers noted.

No.	Title	Writer(s)	Length
1.	"2 Second Style" (featuring Kungg Fuu)		1:56
2.	"Stain Glass"		1:55
3.	"900K"		2:31
4.	"Piotr"		2:58
5.	"Lajan Jwif"		2:28
6.	"Wet Bally" (featuring Meyhem Lauren)	James Rencher	2:19
7.	"Kouign-Amann" (featuring Tha God Fahim)	Fihim Martin	2:46
8.	"Spent Casings" (featuring Big Cheeko)	Chikaodili Umunna	3:22
9.	"NTM" (featuring Tha God Fahim)	Martin	2:40
10.	"Bón Nwit"		2:41
11.	"The Fowler's Snare" (featuring Tha God Fahim)	Martin	2:23
12.	"Mami Wata" (featuring Your Old Droog and Tha God Fahim)	Dmitry Kutsenko; Martin	2:31
Total length:			30:30

== Personnel ==
- Larry "Muggs" Muggerud – arranger, mixing, producer
- Richard "Segal" Huredia – additional mixing
- Dave Kutch – mastering
- "Skinhead Rob" Aston – artwork
- Felipe Romero Jr. – design
