= The Soul Assassins, Chapter I =

Studio album by Soul Assassins
- Released: March 4, 1997
- Recorded: 1996
- Studio: Larrabee Sound Studios (Los Angeles); Ameraycan (Hollywood); The Hit Factory (New York City); The Hill; D&D (New York City); Chung King (New York City)
- Genre: Hip-hop
- Length: 45:31
- Label: Columbia
- Producer: DJ Muggs

Soul Assassins chronology
The Soul Assassins, Chapter I (1997)	Soul Assassins II (2000)

Singles from The Soul Assassins, Chapter I
- 1. "Puppet Master" Released: February 18, 1997

Professional ratings
Review scores
Source	Rating
AllMusic	4/5 stars
Muzik	6/10
The Source	3.5/5 stars
Spin	7/10

Muggs Presents... The Soul Assassins, Chapter I is the first studio album by American hip-hop collective Soul Assassins. It was released on March 4, 1997, via Columbia Records. Recording sessions took place at Larrabee Sound Studios and at Ameraycan Studios in Los Angeles, at The Hit Factory, at D&D Studios and at Chung King Studios in New York, and at The Hill. Produced entirely by DJ Muggs, it features contributions from B-Real, Dr. Dre, Goodie Mob, RZA, GZA, La the Darkman, MC Eiht, KRS-One, Mobb Deep, Infamous Mobb, Call O' Da Wild and Wyclef Jean. The album peaked at number 20 in the United States, at number 28 in France, at number 80 in the Netherlands, and at number 86 in the UK. Its sequel, Soul Assassins II, was released on October 3, 2000.

== Track listing ==
All music is composed by DJ Muggs.

No.	Title	Writer(s)	Length
1.	"The Time Has Come"	Lawrence Muggerud	1:17
2.	"Puppet Master" (with Dr. Dre and B-Real)	Andre Young; Louis Freese; Muggerud; Richard Vick; Isaac Hayes; Alvertis Isbell	5:00
3.	"Decisions, Decisions" (with Goodie Mob)	Thomas Callaway; Cameron Gipp; Robert Terrance Barnett; Willie Knighton; Muggerud	4:29
4.	"Third World" (with RZA and GZA)	Robert Diggs; Gary Grice; Muggerud	4:11
5.	"Battle of 2001" (with B-Real)	Freese; Muggerud	3:18
6.	"Devil in a Blue Dress" (with La the Darkman)	Lason B. Jackson; Muggerud	3:35
7.	"Heavy Weights" (with MC Eiht)	Aaron Tyler; Muggerud	4:10
8.	"Move Ahead" (with KRS-One)	Lawrence Parker; Muggerud	4:38
9.	"It Could Happen to You" (with Mobb Deep)	Kejuan Muchita; Albert Johnson; Muggerud	4:23
10.	"Life Is Tragic" (with Infamous Mobb)	James T. Chandler; Lionel B. Cooper; Jamal Abdul Raheem; Muggerud	4:20
11.	"New York Undercover" (with Call O' Da Wild)	Barron Ricks; Muggerud	2:31
12.	"John 3:16" (with Wyclef Jean)	Nel Ust Wyclef Jean; Muggerud	3:39
Total length:			45:31

== Charts ==
Chart (1997)	Peak position
Dutch Albums (Album Top 100)	80
French Albums (SNEP)	28
UK Albums (OCC)	86
UK R&B Albums (OCC)	14
US Billboard 200	20
US Top R&B Albums (Billboard)	6
