= DJ Solo =

American DJ, producer, rapper, and visual artist

DJ SOLO
- Also known as: SOLO
- Born: Dave Abrams
- Origin: Chicago, Illinois, United States
- Genres: Hip hop Dubstep; Rap; Drumstep; Drum & Bass
- Occupations: DJ; Producer; Visual artist Rapper
- Website: http://www.djsoloisawesome.com

Dave Abrams, better known as DJ Solo (often stylized DJ SOLO), is an American DJ, producer, rapper and visual artist. He is a part of the Cypress Hill affiliated Soul Assassins collective. His production credits include La Coka Nostra, Everlast, Planet Asia, GZA, B-Real, Adil Omar, Mitchy Slick and others. He has released several mash-ups, remixes and a compilation album of his production work, titled My MPC Is A Pipe Bomb, and produced on the Soul Assassins Soul Assassins: Intermission album. He also hosted 40's & Blunts, a weekly internet show.

== Discography ==
- DJ SOLO's Alice In Wonderland
- Requiem For The Living
- A Mile In My Shoes
- Breaking Bass
- Soul Assassins: Classic & Exclusive
- Shut Up & Dance
- SOLOMash
- Jitterbug Driveby (with Roger Jao)
- Hair Metal Hero (with Roger Jao)
- Electric Limo
- My MPC Is A Pipe Bomb
- Open Up The Trunk
- Crush.Kill.Destroy
- DubstepFM: The Dented Sessions 12-13-09
- Fucking & Punching
- In Between Dreams (with Roger Jao)

=== Remixes ===
- The Office (DJ Solo Remix) (2010)
- Ramones - Blitzkrieg Bop (DJ Solo Remix) (2011)
- Umphrey's McGee - "The Domino Theory" & "Deeper" (DJ Solo Remix) (2012)
- Mitchy Slick x Excision x Downlink - Bass Chasers (DJ Solo's Mashup (2012)
Breaking Bass 2011
1. 01. Intro by Charlie Sheen
2. 02. Scary Monsters on Cocaine (DJ SOLO Re-Edit) - Skrillex x Dirtyphonics x Eric Clapton x Grateful Dead
3. 03. What's Good (DJ SOLO Bootleg) - Demrick x Gambit
4. 04. GO (DJ SOLO Re-Edit) - VIP Hacks
5. 05. Magic Fountain (Royalston Drumstep Remix) - Art vs Science
6. 06. A Mile In My Shoes - DJ SOLO
7. 07. King Kong A Day In The System (DJ SOLO Bootleg) - Self Scientific x The Beatles x Terravita
8. 08. Michael Myers Lives (DJ SOLO CHOP) - Urban Assault x Knife Party x Modified Motion & Faction
9. 09. Unruly (DJ SOLO Drumstep Edit) - Messinian, Boy Kid Cloud, Dirty Talk
10. 10. Voice of The LaCokarons (DJ SOLO Bootleg) - La Coka Nostra x Rollz
11. 11. Alex Jones Rules (DJ SOLO Bootleg) - Shufunk (Dub Peddla Remix)
12. 12. Bass Face (DJ SOLO's Gittin It Bootleg) - Datsik x DJ SOLO
13. 13. Bassface (DJ SOLO's XXX Edit) - Flufftronix ft. The Freshest Kidz (Kanji Kinetic Remix)
14. 14. Undah Yuh Skirt Feat. Mavado (Original Mix) - Zeds Dead
15. 15. American Idiot (DJ SOLO Bootleg) - Green Day x Tyke
16. 16. Dancing Is My Life (DJ SOLO Bootleg) - Magma Kum
17. 17. Anyone Else But You - Moldy Peaches
18. 18. Threshold - Sex Bob-omb
19. 19. Vortex to Yonkers (DJ SOLO Drumming Solo)
20. 20. In Yonkers on Crack (SOLO Edit) - Tyler The Creator
21. 21. Stoned Immaculate (DJ SOLO Bootleg) - Macky Gee x The Doors
22. 22. Fok Julle Naaiers - Die Antwoord
23. 23. Beastie Zombie Alien Apocalypse (DJ SOLO Bootleg) - Beastie Boys x Vaski x Figure
24. 24. Hold It Against me (DJ SOLO Drumstep Bootleg) - Britney Spears x DJ Tre
25. 25. Bring It (DJ SOLO Shaolin Drumstep Edit) - Jeekoos x Wu Tang Clan
26. 26. H3LP (DJ SOLO Bootleg) - The Beatles x Noisia
27. 27. I Like Ninja Turtles (DJ SOLO Bootleg) - xKore (Squnto Remix)
28. 28. Green Fingers feat. Desi Roots (DJ SOLO Drumstep Re-Fix) - Brotherhood Of Filth
29. 29. Maliante De Dangebass (DJ SOLO Bootleg) - Voltio x Kenji Kinetic
30. 30. The 8-Bit Trooper (DJ SOLO Bootleg) - Iron Maiden
31. 31. One Eyed Vampire (Prod. By Johnny Juliano) - Ejay
32. 32. Outro by Charlie Sheen
33. 33. Dig Dug Theme Song - Yuriko Keino
34. 34. Excerpt From: The Mist (in 3-D Sound) - Stephen King
35. 35. We Hate You Please Die - Crash and The Boys
36. 36. SOLO calls SHEEN
