= Till Death Do Us Part (Cypress Hill album) =

- North American release cover

Studio album by Cypress Hill
- Released: March 23, 2004
- Recorded: 2002–2004
- Genre: Hip-hop
- Length: 49:38
- Label: Columbia
- Producers: DJ Muggs; Fredwreck; The Alchemist; Tony "CD" Kelly

Cypress Hill chronology
Stoned Raiders (2001)	Till Death Do Us Part (2004)	Rise Up (2010)

Alternative cover
- The cover used for the edited edition of the album. Also the vinyl release of album and special first pressings with sticker insert of above cover with this being cover of the booklet.

Singles from Till Death Do Us Part
- 1. "What's Your Number?" Released: March 19, 2004; 2. "Latin Thugs" Released: 2004

Till Death Do Us Part is the seventh studio album by American hip-hop group Cypress Hill. It was released on March 23, 2004, via Columbia Records. Production was handled by DJ Muggs, Fredwreck, The Alchemist and Tony "CD" Kelly. It features guest appearances from Damian "Jr. Gong" Marley, Prodigy, Tego Calderón, Tim Armstrong and Twin Gambino. The album was supported with two singles: "What's Your Number?" and "Latin Thugs".

== Critical reception ==
Professional ratings
Aggregate scores
Source	Rating
Metacritic	62/100
Review scores
Source	Rating
AllMusic	2/5 stars
Blender	3/5
The Guardian	3/5 stars
laut.de	4/5 stars
The New Rolling Stone Album Guide	2/5 stars
Now	2/5 Ns
RapReviews	8.5/10
Rolling Stone	3/5 stars
Spin	C−
Tiny Mix Tapes	2/5

According to the review aggregator Metacritic, Till Death Do Us Part received "generally favorable reviews" based on a weighted average score of 62 out of 100 from 12 critic scores.

Christian Hoard of Rolling Stone praised the album, stating: "the combination of mournful maturity and club-ready fun they come up with on Till Death Do Us Part suits them just fine". Dave Simpson of The Guardian noted that the album "doesn't break with the formula, but at least it stretches it".

In mixed reviews, Hua Hsu of Blender found "[some] attempts at genre-mashing suffer from some uncharacteristically sluggish Muggs production". Spin magazine reviewer called the album "morbid", adding "the beats are never as heavy as the subject matter". Filmore Mescalito Holmes of Tiny Mix Tapes resumed: "only about a third enjoyable". AllMusic's Andy Kellman concluded: "strictly for the devout fan base".

== Track listing ==
No.	Title	Writer(s)	Producer(s)	Length
1.	"Another Body Drops"	Louis Freese; Senen Reyes; Larry Muggerud	DJ Muggs	3:50
2.	"Till Death Comes"	Freese; Muggerud	DJ Muggs	3:30
3.	"Latin Thugs" (featuring Tego Calderón)	Freese; Reyes; Tego Calderón; Alan Maman	The Alchemist	3:46
4.	"Ganja Bus" (featuring Jr. Gong)	Freese; Reyes; Damian Marley; Anthony Kelly	Tony "CD" Kelly	3:42
5.	"Busted in the Hood"	Freese; Muggerud; Adam Horovitz; Joseph Simmons; Darryl McDaniels; Rick Rubin	DJ Muggs	4:03
6.	"Money"	Freese; Reyes; Muggerud	DJ Muggs	3:33
7.	"Never Know"	Freese; Muggerud	DJ Muggs	3:14
8.	"Last Laugh" (featuring Prodigy and Twin Gambino)	Freese; Reyes; Albert Johnson; Jamal Abdul Raheem; Muggerud; Janie Bradford; Gloria Jones	DJ Muggs	3:42
9.	"Bong Hit"	Muggerud	DJ Muggs	1:20
10.	"What's Your Number?" (featuring Tim Armstrong)	Freese; Muggerud; Paul Simonon	DJ Muggs	3:50
11.	"Once Again"	Freese; Muggerud	DJ Muggs	3:48
12.	"Number Seven"	Muggerud	DJ Muggs	0:50
13.	"One Last Cigarette"	Freese; Muggerud; Piero Piccioni	DJ Muggs	2:46
14.	"Street Wars"	Freese; Muggerud	DJ Muggs	2:42
15.	"Till Death Do Us Part"	Freese; Farid Nassar	Fredwreck	3:54
16.	"Eulogy"	Freese; Muggerud	DJ Muggs	1:08
Total length:				49:38

Sample credits

- Track 5 contains re-sung elements from "Paul Revere" written by Adam Horovitz, Joseph Simmons, Darryl McDaniels and Rick Rubin.
- Track 8 contains replayed elements from "Share My Love" written by Gloria Jones and Janie Bradford.
- Track 10 contains replayed elements from "The Guns of Brixton" written by Paul Simonon.
- Track 13 contains elements from "Distesa Estata" written by Piero Piccioni.

== Personnel ==
- Louis "B-Real" Freese — vocals
- Senen "Sen Dog" Reyes — vocals
- Lawrence "DJ Muggs" Muggerud — additional programming (track 3), producer (tracks: 1, 2, 5–14, 16), mixing
- Tego Calderón — vocals (track 3)
- Damian "Jr. Gong" Marley — vocals (track 4)
- Albert "Prodigy" Johnson — vocals (track 8)
- Jamal "Big Twins"/"Twin Gambino" AbdulRaheem — vocals (track 8)
- Robert "Skinhead Rob" Aston — additional vocals (track 10)
- Aaron "Chace Infinite" Johnson — additional vocals (track 13)
- Traci Nelson — additional vocals (track 15)
- Reggie Stewart — guitar & bass (track 1)
- Mike "Crazy Neck" Sims — additional guitar (track 1), guitar (tracks: 3, 6–8, 10, 11, 14), keyboards (tracks: 2, 3, 6–8, 10, 11, 14), bass (tracks: 2, 3, 7, 8, 14)
- Ray Armundo — congas (track 3)
- Rob Hill — guitar (tracks: 5, 10), keyboards (track 5), bass (tracks: 5, 6, 10, 12, 13), additional guitar (track 6), additional programming (tracks: 1–3, 6–8, 10–14), recording, mixing
- Farid "Fredwreck" Nassar — Moog synthesizer (track 8), guitar & keyboards (track 15)
- Rogelio Lozano — programming (track 9), guitar (tracks: 11, 16), bass (track 11)
- Tim Armstrong — additional guitar (track 10)
- Dan Boer — additional keyboards (track 10)
- Scott Abels — drums (track 10)
- Allen Pahanish — drums (track 13)
- Tim Burton — saxophone (track 13)
- Daniel Alan "The Alchemist" Maman — producer (track 3), additional recording (tracks: 3, 8)
- Tony "CD" Kelly — producer (track 4)
- Brian "Big Bass" Gardner — mastering
- Mark "Mr. Cartoon" Machado — cover illustration design
- Estevan Oriol — photography
- Robb Epifano — photography assistant

== Charts ==
Chart (2004)	Peak position
Australian Albums (ARIA)	28
Austrian Albums (Ö3 Austria)	10
Belgian Albums (Ultratop Flanders)	47
Belgian Albums (Ultratop Wallonia)	35
Dutch Albums (Album Top 100)	39
Finnish Albums (Suomen virallinen lista)	28
French Albums (SNEP)	30
German Albums (Offizielle Top 100)	11
Italian Albums (FIMI)	60
New Zealand Albums (RMNZ)	16
Scottish Albums (Official Charts)	42
Swedish Albums (Sverigetopplistan)	55
Swiss Albums (Schweizer Hitparade)	11
UK Albums (Official Charts)	53
UK R&B Albums (Official Charts)	7
US Billboard 200	21
US Top R&B/Hip-Hop Albums (Billboard)	23

== Certifications ==
Region	Certification	Certified units/sales
Hungary (MAHASZ)	Gold	10,000^{^}
^{^} Shipments figures based on certification alone.
