= Legend of the Mask and the Assassin =

Legend of the Mask & the Assassin

Studio album by DJ Muggs vs. Sick Jacken featuring Cynic
- Released: September 11, 2007
- Recorded: 2007
- Studio: MGS Sound Lab (Burbank, CA)
- Genre: Underground hip-hop; hardcore hip-hop
- Length: 58:16
- Label: Universal Music Latino
- Producer: Sick Jacken (exec.); DJ Muggs (also exec.)

DJ Muggs chronology
Grandmasters (2005)	Legend of the Mask & the Assassin (2007)	Pain Language (2008)

Sick Jacken chronology
Terror Tapes Vol. 1 (2006)	Legend of the Mask & the Assassin (2007)	Stray Bullets (2009)

Cynic chronology
Terror Tapes Vol. 1 (2006)	Legend of the Mask & the Assassin (2007)	Terror Tapes 2 (2012)

Professional ratings
Review scores
Source	Rating
AllMusic	4/5 stars
RapReviews	7.5/10

Legend of the Mask and the Assassin is a collaborative studio album by American Los Angeles–based record producer DJ Muggs and Psycho Realm's rapper Sick Jacken featuring fellow Sick Symphonies' member Cynic of Street Platoon. It was released on September 11, 2007, via Rebel Music Group/Universal Music Latino, serving as Muggs' second album in his "DJ Muggs vs." series. Recording sessions took place at MGS Sound Lab in Burbank, California. Production was handled entirely by Muggs, who also served as executive producer with Jacken.

== Track listing ==
No.	Title	Length
1.	"The Initiation"	3:24
2.	"Mask and the Assassin"	3:54
3.	"Ciclon"	5:00
4.	"Land of Shadows"	4:35
5.	"God's Banker"	3:49
6.	"Reptilian Renaissance"	4:52
7.	"Praying Mantis"	3:42
8.	"El Barrio"	4:19
9.	"Interlude"	2:07
10.	"Unorthodox Blocks"	4:13
11.	"The Hole (P.O.W.)"	2:16
12.	"Stairs to the Beast"	3:24
13.	"Black Ships"	3:55
14.	"Rebel Angels"	0:54
15.	"Silent Crimes"	4:03
16.	"2012"	3:50
Total length:		58:16

== Personnel ==
- Joaquin Gonzalez – main artist, vocals, executive producer
- Lawrence Muggerud – main artist, scratches (tracks: 2, 10, 13), arranger, producer, executive producer
- Richard Alfaro – featured artist (tracks: 1–4, 6–8, 10, 12, 13, 15, 16)
- Khalil Abdul-Rahman – keyboards (tracks: 1, 2, 4, 5, 10, 13)
- Rogelio Lozano – guitar (tracks: 1, 4, 5, 10, 12)
- Steve Ferlazzo – keyboards (tracks: 2–4, 6–8, 10, 13, 15, 16)
- Dave Abrams – scratches (track 2), engineering
- Farid Nassar – scratches (track 3), percussion (track 8)
- Daniel Seeff – guitar (tracks: 5, 8)
- Ray Armando – congas (tracks: 5, 8)
- Shavo Odadjian – sitar (track 5)
- Richard "Segal" Huredia – mixing
- Ernesto "Ern Dog" Medina – engineering
- Brian Gardner – mastering

== Charts ==
Chart (2007)	Peak position
US Top R&B/Hip-Hop Albums (Billboard)	86
US Heatseekers Albums (Billboard)	15
