= Soul Assassins II =

Muggs Presents Soul Assassins II

Studio album by Soul Assassins
- Released: October 3, 2000
- Recorded: 1999–2000
- Studio: The Cutting Room (New York, NY); Battery Studios (New York, NY); Greenstreet Studios (New York, NY); PatchWerk Recording Studios (Atlanta, GA); CMO Greens Studios; Soul Assassins Studio (Los Angeles, CA); D&D Studios (New York, NY)
- Genre: Hip-hop
- Length: 48:06
- Label: RuffLife Records
- Producer: Bigga B (exec.); Alchemist; DJ Khalil; DJ Muggs

Soul Assassins chronology
Muggs Presents... The Soul Assassins Chapter I (1997)	Muggs Presents Soul Assassins II (2000)	Intermission (2009)

Professional ratings
Review scores
Source	Rating
AllMusic	3/5 stars
RapReviews	6.5/10

Muggs Presents Soul Assassins II is the second studio album by American hip-hop collective Soul Assassins. It was released on October 3, 2000, via RuffLife Records. Recording sessions took place at The Cutting Room, at Battery Studios, at Greenstreet Studios and at D&D Studios in New York, at PatchWerk Recording Studios in Atlanta, at Soul Assassins Studios in Los Angeles, and at CMO Greens Studios. Production was primarily handled by DJ Muggs, with three tracks produced by The Alchemist and one by DJ Khalil. The album includes features with Kool G Rap, Infamous Mobb's Godfather Pt. III, Xzibit, King T, GZA, Goodie Mob, Kurupt, Screwball's Hostyle, Self Scientific, Krondon, Phenam a.k.a. Don Krisis, Ras Kass, Dilated Peoples, Roscoe, Buc Fifty, Cypress Hill and Everlast.

== Track listing ==
No.	Title	Writer(s)	Producer(s)	Length
1.	"Real Life" (with Kool G Rap)	Nathaniel Wilson; Lawrence Muggerud	DJ Muggs	4:03
2.	"We Will Survive" (with G.O.D. pt. III of Infamous Mobb)	Lionel Cooper; Muggerud	DJ Muggs	4:19
3.	"You Better Believe It" (with Xzibit & King T)	Alvin Joiner; Roger McBride; Muggerud	DJ Muggs	4:03
4.	"When the Fat Lady Sings" (with GZA)	Gary Grice; Muggerud	DJ Muggs	3:15
5.	"This Some'n To" (with Goodie Mob)	Cameron Gipp; Robert Barnett; Willie Knighton; Muggerud	DJ Muggs	3:24
6.	"Armageddon (Interlude)" (with Kurupt)	Ricardo Brown; Muggerud	DJ Muggs	2:15
7.	"Victory or Defeat" (with Hostyle of Screwball)	Fredrick Ivey; Alan Maman	The Alchemist	4:01
8.	"Heart of the Assassin" (with Chace Infinite, Krondon, Phenam & Ras Kass)	Aaron Johnson; Marvin Jones; D. Brown; John Austin; Muggerud	DJ Muggs	2:26
9.	"Suckers Are Hidin'" (with Dilated Peoples)	Rakaa Taylor; Michael Perretta; Maman	The Alchemist	3:03
10.	"When the Pain Inflict" (with Roscoe, Kurupt)	R. Brown; David Williams; Muggerud	DJ Muggs	3:29
11.	"Don't Trip" (with Cypress Hill)	Louis Freese; Muggerud	DJ Muggs	2:54
12.	"Razor to Your Throat" (with Everlast)	Erik Schrody; Muggerud	DJ Muggs	2:38
13.	"Millennium Thrust" (with Self Scientific)	Johnson; Khalil Abdul-Rahman	DJ Khalil	3:17
14.	"Back Up Off Me" (with Buc Fifty)	Rahsaan Jackson; Maman	The Alchemist	3:48
15.	"When the Fat Lady Sings (Remix)" (with GZA)			3:03
Total length:				48:06

== Personnel ==
- Larry "Muggs" Muggerud – mixing, arranger
- Troy Staton – mixing, recording
- Brian "Big Bass" Gardner – mastering
- Mark "Mr. Cartoon" Machado – design
- Estevan "Scandalous" Oriol – photography
- Paul D. Rosenberg – management
- Theo Sedlmayr – management, legal
- Tracy McNew – project coordinator
- Mike Heron – A&R (tracks: 1, 7)

== Charts ==
Chart (1997)	Peak position
French Albums (SNEP)	70
Swiss Albums (Schweizer Hitparade)	97
