= Pain Language =

Studio album by DJ Muggs & Planet Asia
- Released: September 16, 2008
- Recorded: 2008
- Studio: The Soul Assassins Compound
- Genre: Hip-hop
- Length: 50:45
- Label: Gold Dust Media
- Producer: DJ Muggs (also exec.)

DJ Muggs chronology
| Legend of the Mask and the Assassin (2007) | Pain Language (2008) | Kill Devil Hills (2010) |

Planet Asia chronology
| Jewelry Box Sessions (2007) | Pain Language (2008) | Chain of Command (2010) |

Singles from Pain Language
- 1. "9mm / That's What It Is" Released: August 2008

Professional ratings
Review scores
| Source | Rating |
|---|---|
| HipHopDX | 3/5 |
| laut.de | 3/5 stars |
| Okayplayer | B (85/100) |
| RapReviews | 8.5/10 |
| Robert Christgau | (2-star Honorable Mention) |

Pain Language is a collaborative studio album by American Los Angeles–based record producer DJ Muggs and rapper Planet Asia. It was released on September 16, 2008, via Gold Dust Media. Recording sessions took place at the Soul Assassins Compound. Production was handled entirely by Muggs, who also served as executive producer. It features guest appearances from B-Real, Chace Infinite, Cynic, GZA, Killah Priest, Prodigal Sunn, Scratch, Sick Jacken, Tri State and Turbin. The first single "9mm" b/w "That's What It Is", was made available for free download through SoulAssassins.com.

== Track listing ==
| No. | Title | Writer(s) | Length |
|---|---|---|---|
| 1. | "Sleeper Cell" | Jason Green; Lawrence Muggerud | 3:47 |
| 2. | "Pain Language" | Green; Muggerud | 3:07 |
| 3. | "Smoke" | Muggerud | 1:43 |
| 4. | "9mm" (featuring B-Real) | Green; Louis Freeze; Muggerud | 3:56 |
| 5. | "That's What It Is" | Green; Muggerud | 2:57 |
| 6. | "Black Mask Men" | Green; Muggerud | 3:32 |
| 7. | "Lions in the Forest" (featuring B-Real) | Green; Muggerud | 3:42 |
| 8. | "Death Frees Every Soul" (featuring Sick Jacken) | Green; Joaquin Gonzalez; Muggerud | 3:42 |
| 9. | "All Hail the King" | Green; Muggerud | 4:01 |
| 10. | "Black Angels" (featuring Killah Priest, Cynic and Scratch) | Green; Walter Reed; Richard Alfaro; Kyle Jones; Muggerud | 2:54 |
| 11. | "Language" | Muggerud | 1:56 |
| 12. | "Drama" | Green; Muggerud | 3:27 |
| 13. | "Deadly Blades" (featuring Prodigal Sunn and Tri State) | Green; Vergil Ruff; Donti Ceruti; Muggerud | 2:53 |
| 14. | "Hashashins" (featuring Turbin and Chace Infinite) | Green; Ron Real; Aaron Johnson; Muggerud | 3:10 |
| 15. | "Shadows of Hell" | Green; Muggerud | 2:35 |
| 16. | "Triple Threat" (featuring GZA and Chace Infinite) | Green; Gary Grice; Johnson; Muggerud | 3:23 |
| Total length: | | | 50:45 |

== Personnel ==
- Lawrence "DJ Muggs" Muggerud – main artist, arranger, mixing, producer, executive producer
- Jason "Planet Asia" Green – main artist, vocals (tracks: 1, 2, 4–10, 12–16)
- Louis "B-Real" Freese – featured artist (tracks: 4, 7)
- Joaquin "Sick Jacken" Gonzalez – featured artist (track 8)
- Walter "Killah Priest" Reed – featured artist (track 10)
- Richard "Cynic" Alfaro – featured artist (track 10)
- Kyle "Scratch" Jones – featured artist (track 10)
- Vergil "Prodigal Sunn" Ruff – featured artist (track 13)
- Donti "Tri State" Ceruti – featured artist (track 13)
- Ron "Turbin" Real – featured artist (track 14)
- Aaron "Chace Infinite" Johnson – featured artist (tracks: 14, 16)
- Gary "GZA" Grice – featured artist (track 16)
- Steve Ferlazzo – keyboards (tracks: 1, 2, 4–6, 8–15)
- Mikey Fingers – guitar (track 3)
- "DJ Khalil" Abdul-Rahman – keyboards (tracks: 4, 5, 8, 14), bass & piano (track 16)
- Keefus Green – keyboards (tracks: 7, 10)
- Dan Cephus – guitar (tracks: 8, 13), bass (track 8)
- Ernesto "Ern Dog" Medina – recording
- Richard "Segal" Huredia – mixing
- Eddy Schreyer – mastering
- Dave "DJ Solo" Abrams – design
- Cesario Montano – photography
