= Kill Devil Hills (album) =

Studio album by DJ Muggs vs. Ill Bill
- Released: August 31, 2010
- Genre: Hardcore hip-hop; underground hip-hop; conscious hip-hop
- Label: Uncle Howie Records; Fat Beats
- Producer: Joseph Abajian (exec.); Ill Bill (exec.); DJ Muggs (also exec.); DJ Khalil; G. Rocka

DJ Muggs chronology
| Pain Language (2008) | Kill Devil Hills (2010) | Bass For Your Face (2012) |

Ill Bill chronology
| The Hour of Reprisal (2008) | Kill Devil Hills (2010) | Heavy Metal Kings (2011) |

Singles from Kill Devil Hills
- 1. "Narco Corridos" Released: July 11, 2010; 2. "Cult Assassin" Released: July 11, 2010; 3. "Ill Bill TV" Released: August 11, 2010; 4. "Illuminati 666" Released: September 14, 2010

Professional ratings
Review scores
| Source | Rating |
|---|---|
| Faygoluvers | 5/5 stars |
| HipHopDX | 4/5 |
| RapReviews | 8/10 |
| Sputnikmusic | 3/5 |

DJ Muggs vs. Ill Bill: Kill Devil Hills is a collaborative studio album by American Los Angeles-based record producer DJ Muggs and New York-based rapper Ill Bill. It was released on August 31, 2010, via Fat Beats, serving as Muggs' third album in his "DJ Muggs vs." series. Production was handled by DJ Muggs, except for two track produced by G. Rocka and DJ Khalil. It features guest appearances from B-Real, Sick Jacken, Chace Infinite, Everlast, O.C., Q-Unique, Raekwon, Slaine, Sean Price, Vinnie Paz and Uncle Howie. The album is dedicated to Ill Bill's uncle, Howard Tenebaum, who died five months before the record release. Kill Devil Hills peaked at number 86 on the Top R&B/Hip-Hop Albums, number 21 on the Top Rap Albums and number 17 on Heatseekers Albums charts in the United States, and also named one of 'Top 25 Albums of 2010' by HipHopDX.

== Track listing ==
| No. | Title | Writer(s) | Producer(s) | Length |
|---|---|---|---|---|
| 1. | "Cult Assassin" | William Braunstein; Lawrence Muggerud | DJ Muggs | 2:47 |
| 2. | "Trouble Shooters" (featuring Sick Jacken, Sean Price and O.C.) | Braunstein; Joaquin Gonzalez; Sean Price; Omar Credle; Muggerud | DJ Muggs | 3:34 |
| 3. | "Paul Stanley" | Braunstein; Muggerud | DJ Muggs | 0:33 |
| 4. | "Illuminati 666" | Braunstein; Gonzalo Estrada | G Rocka | 2:06 |
| 5. | "Amputated Saint" (featuring B-Real) | Braunstein; Louis Freese; Muggerud | DJ Muggs | 3:11 |
| 6. | "Skull & Guns" (featuring Slaine and Everlast) | Braunstein; George Carroll; Erik Schrody; Muggerud | DJ Muggs | 3:31 |
| 7. | "Giants Stadium" (featuring Q-Unique) | Braunstein; Anthony Quiles; Muggerud | DJ Muggs | 2:39 |
| 8. | "The Owl" | Braunstein; Muggerud | DJ Muggs | 0:58 |
| 9. | "Millenniums of Murder" | Braunstein; Muggerud | DJ Muggs | 3:23 |
| 10. | "Chase Manhattan" (featuring Raekwon) | Braunstein; Corey Woods; Muggerud | DJ Muggs | 2:05 |
| 11. | "Luciferian Imperium" | Khalil Abdul-Rahman | DJ Khalil | 0:40 |
| 12. | "Ill Bill TV" | Braunstein; Muggerud | DJ Muggs | 2:29 |
| 13. | "Secrets Worth Dying For" (featuring Chace Infinite) | Braunstein; Aaron Johnson; Muggerud | DJ Muggs | 3:30 |
| 14. | "2013" | Braunstein; Muggerud | DJ Muggs | 1:46 |
| 15. | "Kill Devil Hills" (featuring B-Real and Vinnie Paz) | Braunstein; Freese; Vincenzo Luvineri; Muggerud | DJ Muggs | 3:54 |
| 16. | "Narco Corridos" (featuring Sick Jacken and Uncle Howie) | Braunstein; Gonzalez; Muggerud | DJ Muggs | 3:09 |

== Personnel ==
- William Braunstein – main artist, rap vocals (tracks: 1–10, 12–16), executive producer
- Lawrence Muggerud – main artist, producer (tracks: 1–3, 5–10, 12–16), mixing, executive producer
- Gonzalo Alonzo Estrada – producer (track 4), drum programming (tracks: 12–13)
- Steve Ferlazzo – additional keyboards (tracks: 1, 4, 6–7, 9–10, 12–16)
- Jaymes Quirino – mastering
- Ernie "Ern Dog" Medina – recording
- Eric "Bobo" Correa – congas (track 10)
- Khalil Abdul-Rahman – producer (track 11)
- Joseph Abajian – executive producer
- Jeferson Fernandes – cover artwork
- Donna McLeer – graphics & layout
- Eden Braunstein – photography
- Jack Gonzales – featured artist (tracks: 2, 16)
- Louis Freese – featured artist (tracks: 5, 15)
- Anthony Quiles – featured artist (track 7), additional vocals (track 14)
- Omar Credle – featured artist (track 2)
- Sean Price – featured artist (track 2)
- Erik Schrody – featured artist (track 6)
- George Carroll – featured artist (track 6)
- Corey Woods – featured artist (track 10)
- Aaron Johnson – featured artist (track 13)
- Vincenzo Luvineri – featured artist (track 15)

== Charts ==
| Chart (2010) | Peak position |
|---|---|
| US Top R&B/Hip-Hop Albums (Billboard) | 86 |
| US Top Rap Albums (Billboard) | 21 |
| US Heatseekers Albums (Billboard) | 17 |
