= Kaliphz =

British hip-hop group (active 1992–1997)

- Origin: Rochdale, Greater Manchester, England
- Genres: Hip-hop
- Years active: 1992–1997
- Labels: Payday; FFRR
- Past members: Jabba Da Hype; 2-Phaan; Poet Saqi; Chok the funky Polak; Seftonik the Demonik; DJ XL; Sniffa Dawg N.A.D

Kaliphz were a British hip hop group, formed in Rochdale by 2-Phaan (real name Mush Khan) and Jabba da Hype (real name Jabbar Khan). They began as part of the breakdancing scene in the early 1980s before branching out into spoken word and rap as other members joined the group. The group had a constantly shifting membership and various name changes reflected this. Kaliphz are most well known for a subsequent pop career as Kaleef, during which they recorded a record with Prince Naseem Hamed and also a remix of the Stranglers' "Golden Brown".

== History ==
Kaliphz were formed in Rochdale (a working class town in Greater Manchester) by the British Asians 2-Phaan and Jabba da Hype. Inspired by a performance of the Rock Steady Crew they saw in 1982, the duo formed a breakdance and graffiti crew called Dizzy Footwork, Dizzy footwork were formed and inspired by the Original Members of Dizzy Footwork Crew Mush, Zulf, and Peps childhood friends from the Wardleworth area of Rochdale. Kaliphz were ultimately born out of Dizzy footwork. Mush and Jabba also began to do rap based politically charged spoken word performances under the name Nu Konshus Kaliphz. They were joined by Poet Saquib who managed the band for a short while, Chok the Phunky Polak, DJ XL, Sniffa Dog NAD and Sefton to form the first line up of what became the Kaliphz.

In 1993, the production team of Martin Price and Nel Johnson a.k.a. 'FunkRegulators' arranged for the group to be signed to London Records and Payday records in the US. Funk Regulators recorded and produced the Kaliphz debut album along with a track for the soundtrack to the film Shopping. The album, Seven Deadly Sins (Payday/FFRR, 1995) featured a strong political and anti-racist stance, and received moderate critical acclaim, but London Records were not satisfied with its sales. The group expanded with the addition of Leeds-based rapper Wiz (aka Oddball, real name Paul Edmeade) who had recently departed the group Breaking the Illusion.

Following this, London's A&R man Pete Tong suggested them to Jive Records, who paired the group with the record producer Pete Waterman. Under Waterman's influence, and record label pressure, the group changed their name again to Kaleef and moved their musical style in a more pop direction. This led to the recording of their second album, 53rd State of Mind (Jive, 1997). Unhappy with the directions they were moving in, the group split shortly after the release of their second album.

The group appeared on the UK Singles Chart with (as Kaliphz) "Walk Like a Champion" (Payday/FFRR, 1995) featuring boxer Prince Naseem Hamed, and (as Kaleef) "Golden Brown" (Jive, 1997) - a re-working of the Stranglers song about drug use.

== Discography ==
=== Albums ===
As Kaliphz:

- Seven Deadly Sins (Payday/FFRR, 1995)

As Kaleef:

- 53rd State of Mind (Jive, 1997)

=== Singles ===
Year	Title	UK Singles Chart	Credited to
1996	"Walk Like a Champion"	23	Kaliphz featuring Prince Naseem
1996	"Golden Brown"	22	Kaleef
1997	"Trials of Life"	75	Kaleef
1997	"I Like the Way (The Kissing Game)"	58	Kaleef
1998	"Sands of Time"	26	Kaleef
