= Psycho Realm =

Mexican-American hip hop group

The Psycho Realm
- Origin: Mazatlán, Sinaloa, Mexico; Los Angeles, California, U.S.
- Genres: West Coast hip hop; political hip hop; hardcore hip hop; gangsta rap; underground hip hop
- Years active: 1989–present
- Labels: Sick Symphonies; Soul Assassins Records; Ruffhouse Records; Columbia Records; Sony Music Entertainment
- Members: Sick Jacken; Cynic
- Past members: Big Duke; B-Real; Ferruco
- Website: http://www.thepsychoshop.com

The Psycho Realm is a Mexican-American hip hop group started in 1989 by the brothers Sick Jacken and Big Duke both born in Mazatlán, Sinaloa, Mexico, and raised in the Downtown neighborhood of Pico-Union area of Los Angeles, California, U.S.

== History ==
The group started as a duo of Sick Jacken (Joaquín Gonzalez) and Big Duke (Gustavo Gonzalez) in 1989; the two were later joined by Ferruco (Jose Martinez) in 1993. The group recorded various demo songs, but one track ("Scandalous") appeared on the soundtrack to the 1994 film Mi Vida Loca. Ferruco departed from the group in 1994. The following year, B-Real (Louis Freese) of the rap group Cypress Hill saw Psycho Realm performing at Olvera Street for an End Barrio Warfare concert. Their performance inspired B-Real to the point that he wanted to join the group.

In 1997 Sony released the first Psycho Realm album, labelled as an addition to the Cypress Hill Family by the sticker placed on the CD case. Due to conflicts with the record label, the Gonzalez brothers were dropped from Sony. As Jacken explains, "the machine was just trying to censor me / Didn't do it for Sony so they ended up releasing me / Independent, no longer locked down for an infinity / So my vicinity stays true to my identity." The brothers then went on to form Sick Symphonies, their own record label, which lacked the big budget for promotion and distribution in chain stores along with group member B-Real, who was stuck on his contract with Sony for Cypress Hill.

=== Shooting ===
At 12:35 a.m. on January 29, 1999, one month before the expected release of the second Psycho Realm album, Duke was shot in the neck in a confrontation while trying to split up a fight at Tommy's Burger Stand at Beverly and Rampart Boulevard in Los Angeles. This left him paralyzed from the neck down for life. The shooter, a 24-year-old named Robert Gorcsi, who was on parole at the time of the shooting, was given a bond set at $1.6 million. He was eventually jailed for attempted murder. Later in 2000, Jacken released A War Story Book I with B-Real only appearing on one song. In 2001, the Sick Symphonies label released The Steel Storm, the first album of a new group called Street Platoon. Jacken, with the help of Street Platoon, finished A War Story Book II, which was released in the latter half of 2003 and nearly complete before the shooting of Duke.

== Style and lyrics ==
The group aims to inject pride and knowledge into those who live in gang-infested, poverty-ridden neighborhoods, while at the same time aiming to open the minds of the ones on the outside who look down upon them. Jacken attempts to explain to outsiders with his statement: "my people’s exodus results in prejudice / you ask us why in poverty we become terrorists/ well let me tell you this we don’t choose to tote gats / and selling on the corner is to avoid tax." Duke views the group not as rappers, but neighborhood reporters. They choose to document "a time when it's in fashion to be gun-flashing, blasting... strapped ready for rivals harassing." The Psycho Realm spoke about the corruption of Rampart police officers from their experiences living in the Rampart district, before the Rampart Scandal hit the media. The group also promotes the unification of gangs with remarks such as, "think about who dies when we let the lead out, we’re killing family tragically." The Psycho Realm has grown a worldwide following of "soldiers," and have performed in Mexico, Latin America, Japan, and Europe. At the moment, Duke is in charge of all merchandising for Psycho Realm. Duke is known to personally reply to many of his fans' emails, and is actively involved in a large percentage of production in Psycho Realm's and other affiliates' works.

== Discography ==
=== Albums ===
- 1997: The Psycho Realm
- 2000: A War Story Book I
- 2003: A War Story Book II

=== Sick Jacken appearances ===
- 1999: Videodrone track "Pig In A Blanket" from the self-titled album.
- 2000: Delinquent Habits track "Midnite Spin" from the album Merry Go Round
- 2003: Los Razos de Sacramento La loquera from The album Hierbabuena.
- 2003: Cartel De Santa track "Jake Mate" from the album Cartel de Santa.
- 2003: blink-182 track "The Fallen Interlude" from the album blink-182.
- 2004: RBX track "West Side Story" from the album The Shining.
- 2006: P.O.D. tracks "On the Grind" and "Mark My Words" from the album Testify.
- 2006: Swollen Members track "Sinister" from the album Black Magic.
- 2006: Sinful el pecador from Tha Mexakinz la conección del año in Terrortapes vol 1
- 2007: Evidence track "Born in LA" from the album The Weatherman LP.
- 2007: Cormega track "Live From The Caves" from the album Who Am I?.
- 2007: Delinquent Habits track "Sick Habits" from the album New and Improved
- 2008: Immortal Technique track "Hollywood Driveby" from the album The 3rd World.
- 2008: Snowgoons track "Sick Life" from the album Black Snow.
- 2008: DJ Babu track "Black and Brown Army" from the album Duck Season Vol. 3.
- 2008: OuterSpace track "Anointing of The Sick" from the album God's Fury.
- 2008: DJ Muggs vs. Planet Asia track "Death Frees Every Soul" from the album Pain Language.
- 2009: Kemo The Blaxican from Delinquent Habits track El Negocio
- 2009: B-Real track "Psycho Realm Revolution" from the album Smoke N Mirrors.
- 2009: La Coka Nostra tracks "Brujeria", "Soldier's Story" and "Fuck Tony Montana" from the album A Brand You Can Trust.
- 2010: Vinnie Paz track "No Spiritual Surrender" from the album Season of the Assassin.
- 2010: Strong Arm Steady track "Pressure" from the album In Search of Stoney Jackson.
- 2010: DJ Muggs vs Ill Bill tracks "Trouble Shooters" and "Narco Corridos" from the album Kill Devil Hills.
- 2010: Q-Unique track "Between Heaven and Hell" from the album Between Heaven & Hell.
- 2010: Kemo The Blaxican track "The Gathering" from the album Upside of Struggle.
- 2010: HCP track "La Verdad" from the album De las calles para las calles and rapper Sinful's mixtape Mexican Idol.
- 2010: MURS & 9th Wonder track "The Problem Is..." From the album Fornever
- 2011: OuterSpace track "Lost Angels" from the album My Brother's Keeper
- 2012: Adil Omar track "One by One" from the album The Mushroom Cloud Effect.
- 2012: P.O.D. track "Murdered Love" from the album Murdered Love.
- 2012: Bambu track "Th Eshit" from the album ...one rifle per family .
- 2015: Ariana Puello and Canserbero Hablamos de Respeto from Respira
- 2016: La Coka Nostra tracks "I Need Help", and "High Times" from the album To Thine Own Self Be True.
- 2016: Estragos Trifulka La calle me hizo así with Elote
- 2019: C-Kan "Santa María" single
- 2019: "Cynic Everything" off single Of Drug soul
- 2021: Alemán (Mexican rapper) "La tundra" from the album Huracán
- 2022: Madchild single “Work For It”, featuring Obnoxious
- 2023: Cappadonna from Wu Tang Clan 3rd Chambear grail bars un The theme Everything Is measured

=== Psycho Realm presents Sick Symphonies ===
- 2005: Psycho Realm and Street Platoon Present... Sick Symphonies: Sickside Stories
- 2007: Sick Symphonies Presents DJ FM Street Mixes Vol.1

=== Sick Jacken albums ===
- 2006: Sick Jacken & Cynic - Terror Tapes Vol. 1
- 2007: DJ Muggs vs. Sick Jacken - Legend of the Mask and the Assassin
- 2009: Sick Jacken - Stray Bullets
- 2012: Sick Jacken & Cynic - Terror Tapes Vol. 2
- 2016: Sick Jacken - Psychodelic
