= DJ Muggs =

American record producer (born 1968)

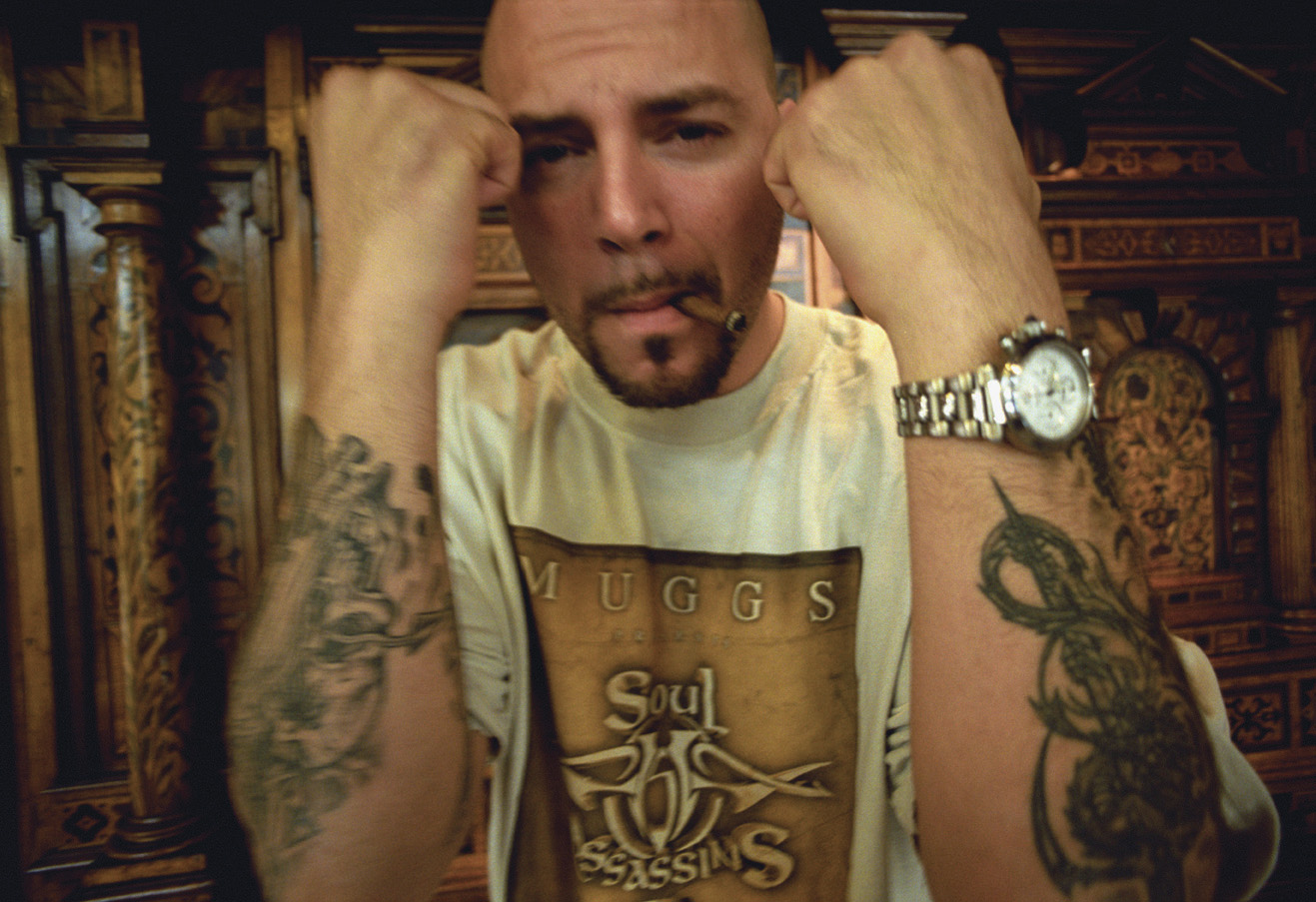
- DJ Muggs in 2000

Background information
- Born: Lawrence Muggerud; January 28, 1968 (age 58); Queens, New York City, U.S.
- Origin: Los Angeles, California, U.S.
- Genres: Hip-hop; trip hop
- Occupations: Record producer; disc jockey; mixing engineer
- Years active: 1987–present
- Labels: Mishka; ANTI-; Ultra; Sacred Bones
- Member of: Cypress Hill; Kill Em All; Soul Assassins
- Formerly of: Cross My Heart Hope to Die

Lawrence Muggerud (born January 28, 1968), known professionally as DJ Muggs, is an American record producer. He has been a member of Cypress Hill, a member of the trip hop band Cross My Heart Hope to Die and the leader of hip-hop and art collective Soul Assassins.

During his career, he has produced tracks for House of Pain, Funkdoobiest, Daddy Freddy, Pavlos Fyssas, Die Antwoord, Westside Gunn, remixed songs for Janet Jackson, U2, Kaliphz, Simply Red, Depeche Mode, and collaborated with Tricky, GZA, Sick Jacken, Planet Asia, Ill Bill, Meyhem Lauren and Roc Marciano. As part of Cypress Hill, he received three Grammy nominations for "Insane in the Brain", "I Ain't Goin' Out Like That" and "Throw Your Set in the Air".

He composed the film score of the 2023 feature film Divinity, along with musician and composer Dean Hurley.

== Life and career ==
Of Italian descent, Muggerud was born in Queens borough of New York City, and was later adopted by his stepfather, of Norwegian descent. He moved to Bell Gardens, California at age fourteen, and got his start DJing for hip-hop group The 7A3, who put out one album in 1988 before disbanding.

=== Cypress Hill (1988–2004) ===
After linking up with B-Real and Sen Dog to form the group Cypress Hill, he went on to produce seven studio albums with the group from 1991 to 2004. Of the seven, four reached platinum status, and three gold. Meanwhile, he scored hits on the side with Ice Cube's "Check Yo Self" and House of Pain's "Jump Around". During Cypress Hill's early years, Muggerud met The Alchemist and his Dilated Peoples brethren on tour, deciding to take the young producer under his wing, providing a jump-start for his career.

=== Soul Assassins ===
In 1997, Muggerud released an album under the name Soul Assassins. The album, Soul Assassins I, reached #86 on the Billboard 200 and earned critical praise. Produced by Muggerud, it featured Dr. Dre, B-Real, La the Darkman, Infamous Mobb, Mobb Deep, RZA, GZA, Goodie Mob, KRS-One and Wyclef Jean. In 2000 he returned to the Soul Assassins with Soul Assassins II, which reached only #178 on the charts but garnered similarly positive reviews. He also put out the record Dust, an atmosphere-heavy trip hop affair with Greg Dulli, Amy Trujillo and Everlast on vocals. After the 2004 album Till Death Do Us Part, which reached #23 on the Billboard 200, Cypress Hill went on a hiatus from recording, enabling its members to focus more on their side projects.

=== Further solo projects and return of Cypress Hill (2005–2010) ===
In 2005, Muggerud teamed up with Wu-Tang Clan's GZA for the album Grandmasters, the first project released on his label Angeles Records. Patterned after a chess game, it received positive reviews; Muggerud also announced a Soul Assassins III album, produced jointly by himself and Alchemist, reportedly to be preceded by a record called Cloak & Dagger, also featuring Alchemist. Instead, Muggerud produced an album for Psycho Realm member Sick Jacken, Legend of the Mask and the Assassin two years later, in 2007. In 2008, Muggerud announced that his album with California rapper Planet Asia would be the third Soul Assassins album, but the two released Pain Language later that year as a simple collaboration.

Before the release of his solo album Smoke n Mirrors in 2009, B-Real reported that Cypress Hill has been working on an album for roughly a year. Currently in the mixing phase, Muggerud has produced half of the album's material so far, going to DJ Premier, Pete Rock and Mike Shinoda for the rest. In 2009, Muggerud entered the Gumball 3000 cross-country race, and on June 23, 2009, Soul Assassins: Intermission was released, featuring RZA, Prodigy, Evidence, The Alchemist and Bun B. The first single for the album was "Gangsta Shit" by Bun B and M1. Despite its high-profile guest list, the release was met with lukewarm reception, and Muggerud later clarified its status as a preview before the release of Soul Assassins III, the next full-fledged installment of his Soul Assassins series. Muggerud plans next on recording his 5th V.S. album with group member B-Real. and in 2013 he confirmed a VS album with Meyhem Lauren as well.

On the Soul Assassins official website, it was also revealed that Muggerud contributed production to Apathy's song "Fear Itself" from rapper's Honkey Kong album, which was released August 23, 2011.

In 2011, Muggerud announced the release of a new album entitled Bass for Your Face, which he described as a 'West Coast dubstep album'. In October 2011, Muggerud confirmed via his Twitter account that Public Enemy frontman Chuck D would contribute to the album, and the lead single would feature UK artist Dizzee Rascal and Los Angeles upstart MC Bambu.

=== Cross My Heart Hope to Die ===
Muggerud returned to the trip hop genre by teaming up with vocalist Brevi, fellow producer Andrew Kline (from the hardcore punk band Strife) and Sean Bonner, who served as a curator, hacker and creative technologist of the project. CMHHTD released their debut four-track self-titled extended play on April 2, 2013, and it was promoted by three music videos "Wild Side", "Miracles" and "Roller Coasting". On July 29, 2014, the band released their second extended play, Vita E Morte, it was supported by two music videos "Two Shots" and "Tears Of God". Both EPs were released via Alpha Pup Records and also were released later as Cross My Heart Hope To Die eight-track album.

== Discography ==
=== with Soul Assassins ===
Studio albums

- 1997: Muggs Presents... The Soul Assassins Chapter I
- 2000: Muggs Presents Soul Assassins II
- 2009: DJ Muggs Presents Soul Assassins: Intermission
- 2018: Soul Assassins: Dia del Asesinato
- 2023: Soul Assassins 3: Death Valley

=== Solo ===
- 2003: Dust
- 2013: Bass for Your Face
- 2020: Winter
- 2021: Dies Occidendum
- 2021: Winter 2
- 2023: Notes & Tones
- 2024: Silver Cloud
- 2024: Soul Assassins Instrumental Library Vol. 1
- 2024: Soul Assassins Instrumental Library Vol. 2
- 2025: Notes & Tones (Second Vintage)
- 2025: Soul Assassins Instrumental Library Vol. 3

=== Extended plays ===
- 2012: Sound Boy Killa
- 2012: Sound Clash Business
- 2018: Frozen Angels (with Meyhem Lauren)
- 2019: Members Only (with Meyhem Lauren)
- 2023: Lofi Punk (with 8tari Lofipunk)

=== Mixtapes ===
- 2000: Cornerstone Mixtape 16: Kalifornication (with Insane Mixaken)
- 2002: Soul Assassins Mixtape Vol. One
- 2004: The Last Assassin (with Chace Infinite)
- 2005: Mash Up Radio (Hip Hop vs. Rock) Vol. 1 (with DJ Warrior)
- 2005: Mash Up Radio (Hip Hop vs. Rock) Vol. 2 (with DJ Warrior)
- 2005: Machine Shop Mixtape Volume 1
- 2006: Soul Assassins: Take Aim
- 2006: Mash-Up Radio: The Aftermash (with Ern Dog)
- 2011: The Los Angeles, Philippines Mixtape (with Bambu)
- 2012: Rock the Bells Official Mixtape

=== Film score ===
- 2023: Divinity (Original Motion Picture Score) (with Dean Hurley)
- 2024: Death Valley (Original Motion Picture Score)

=== Collaborations ===
- 1999: Juxtapose (with Tricky and Grease)
- 2005: Grandmasters (vs. GZA)
- 2007: Legend of the Mask and the Assassin (vs. Sick Jacken feat. Cynic)
- 2008: Pain Language (with Planet Asia)
- 2010: Kill Devil Hills (vs. Ill Bill)
- 2017: Gems from the Equinox (with Meyhem Lauren)
- 2018: Kaos (with Roc Marciano)
- 2019: Hell's Roof (with Lil' Eto)
- 2019: Tuez-Les Tous (with Mach-Hommy as "Kill Em All")
- 2019: Medallo (with Crimeapple)
- 2019: Kill Em All (Self-titled) (with Mach-Hommy)
- 2019: Dump Assassins (with Tha God Fahim)
- 2020: Kilogram (with Al Divino)
- 2021: Death & the Magician (with Rome Streetz)
- 2021: Rammellzee (with Flee Lord)
- 2021: Mile Zero (with Yelawolf)
- 2021: American Cheese (with Hologram)
- 2021: Cartagena (with Crimeapple)
- 2022: Gold (with Rigz)
- 2022: Sin Cortar (with Crimeapple)
- 2022: What They Hittin 4 (with Jay Worthy)
- 2023: Champagne For Breakfast (with Madlib and Meyhem Lauren)
- 2024: Roc Star (with Mooch)
- 2024: The Eternal Now (with Raz Fresco)
- 2024: Los Pollos Hermanos (with Crimeapple and RLX)
- 2026: Lay It Down (with Heartbreak JC)
- 2026: Dont Call Me Lucky (with T.F.)

=== Cross My Heart Hope To Die ===
- 2013: Cross My Heart Hope to Die EP
- 2014: Vita E Morte
- 2014: Cross My Heart Hope to Die

== Awards and nominations ==
Year	Nominee / work	Award	Result	Ref.
1993	"Insane in the Brain"	Grammy Award for Best Rap Performance by a Duo or Group	Nominated	
1994	"I Ain't Goin' Out Like That"	Grammy Award for Best Rap Performance by a Duo or Group	Nominated	
1995	"Throw Your Set in the Air"	Grammy Award for Best Rap Performance by a Duo or Group	Nominated	
