= A'Me Lorain =

American singer (born 1967)

- Born: Amy Trujillo; May 11, 1967 (age 59); Simi Valley, California, U.S.
- Genres: Funk; pop; rock
- Occupation: Singer
- Years active: 1989–2010s
- Label: RCA
- Formerly of: The Family Affair

A'me Lorain (born Amy Trujillo on May 11, 1967, in Simi Valley, California) is an American singer who fronted the funk band the Family Affair.

A'me Lorain & the Family Affair released one album on RCA Records in 1989, titled Starring In... Standing in a Monkey Sea. The funk band was a true "family affair", with her brother Freddy Trujillo on bass and her then-husband Victor Indrizzo playing guitar and drums.

A 1990 single, "Whole Wide World", was a dance hit in the United States, peaking at No. 9 on the Hot Dance Play chart and No. 37 on the Hot Dance Maxi Singles chart. The song crossed over to the Billboard Hot 100, peaking at No. 9, and appeared on the soundtrack to the film True Love (1989).
