= Bambu (rapper) =

- Also known as: Jonah Deocampo; Bambu DePistola
- Born: Jonah Deocampo
- Origin: Los Angeles, California, U.S.
- Genre: Hip hop
- Occupations: Rapper, community activist
- Instrument: Vocals
- Label: Beatrock Music
- Website: https://beatrockmusic.com/

Jonah Deocampo, better known by his stage name Bambu, is a Filipino-American community activist and rapper from Los Angeles, California. He has been called "one of the most well-respected indie musicians in the US".

The son of a Filipino emigrant mother, Bambu was raised in a working-class Los Angeles neighborhood which was characterized by a "wartime mentality." At the age of 15, he became involved with street gangs. At 16, he was arrested for armed robbery and spent time in Los Angeles' Central Juvenile Hall. Released at 18, Bambu was advised by a judge to join the United States Marine Corps, which he did. He served as a special operations training group instructor (SARC) and spent time in East Timor, the Middle East, and Okinawa, Japan.

Bambu's Exrcising a Demon is a 5-part series that weaves voices from Filipino-American gang members as a means of documenting early 1980s and 1990s Los Angeles. Article I: A Few Left was released in September 2018, and Article II: Brother Hoods was released in June 2019.

Bambu's music deals with themes of police brutality, racial prejudice and economic inequality. His music often alludes to leftist figures, including Karl Marx, Vladimir Lenin, and Mao Zedong. For example, his 2007 album ...i scream bars for the children... features a song entitled "Chairman Mao".

He is a resident of Oakland, California.

He also had a deal with FlipTop Battle League, showing in their live events, such as the FlipTop Festival.

During the height of the 2020 COVID-19 pandemic, Bambu released a 7-song album titled Sharpest Tool in the Shed. The album found Bambu continuing his staunch critique of the status quo, as well as giving words of support to his listeners as they worked through the pandemic.

== Discography ==
- self untitled... (2002), self-released
- .38 Revolver Mixtape (2005), self-released
- ...i scream bars for the children... (2007), self-released
- ...exact change... (2009), Beatrock Music
- ...A Peaceful Riot... - Fatgums X Bambu (2009), Beatrock Music
- ...paper cuts... (2010), Beatrock Music
- Los Angeles, Philippines - DJ Muggs & Bambu (2010), Soul Assassins Records
- ...spare change... (2011), Beatrock Music
- Prometheus Brown and Bambu Walk into a Bar - The Bar (2011), Beatrock Music x In4mation
- Diamond Supply Co. Presents: Bambu FreEP (2011), Diamond Supply Co.
- ...one rifle per family. (2012), Beatrock Music
- The Lean Sessions EP (2013), Beatrock Music
- Sun of a Gun Mixtape (2013), Beatrock Music
- Barkada EP - The Bar (2014), Beatrock Music
- 5AM in Manila EP (2014), Beatrock Music x Uprising Records
- Party Worker (2014), Beatrock Music x Bambu De Pistola
- Son of Barkada - The Bar (2015), Beatrock Music
- The Comrades Sessions EP (2015), Beatrock Music
- Prey for the Devil (2016), Beatrock Music
- Exrcising a Demon - Article I - A Few Left (2018), Beatrock Music
- Exrcising a Demon - Article II - Brother Hoods (2019), Beatrock Music
- Sharpest Tool In The Shed (2020), Beatrock Music
- Unreleased: October 2019 By OJ the Producer (2021), Beatrock Music
- Dittybop II (2022), Beatrock Music
- If You See Someone Stealing Food... No, You Didn't. (2024), Beatrock Music
- They're Burning The Boats (2025), Beatrock Music
- Nothing To Declare (2025), Beatrock Music x Uprising Records
