= Soul Assassins =

American hip-hop project

- Founded: 1992
- Founder: DJ Muggs
- Status: Active
- Genre: Hardcore hip-hop
- Country of origin: United States
- Official website: Official website

Soul Assassins is a hardcore hip-hop project of Cypress Hill member and producer DJ Muggs. Each album features a plethora of guest rappers and is primarily produced by Muggs; the second and third studio albums see contributions from other producers such as The Alchemist and DJ Khalil.

Soul Assassins is also a marketing brand, with visuals created by chicano artists and friends Estevan Oriol (analogue street photographer) and Mister Cartoon (street artist and tattooer).

== Discography ==
=== Albums ===
- 1997: The Soul Assassins, Chapter I
- 2000: Soul Assassins II
- 2009: Intermission
- 2018: Dia del Asesinato
- 2023: Soul Assassins III

=== Singles ===
- 1997: U2 - Last Night on Earth (Numb remix)
