= Bonnie McKee discography =

Singer discography

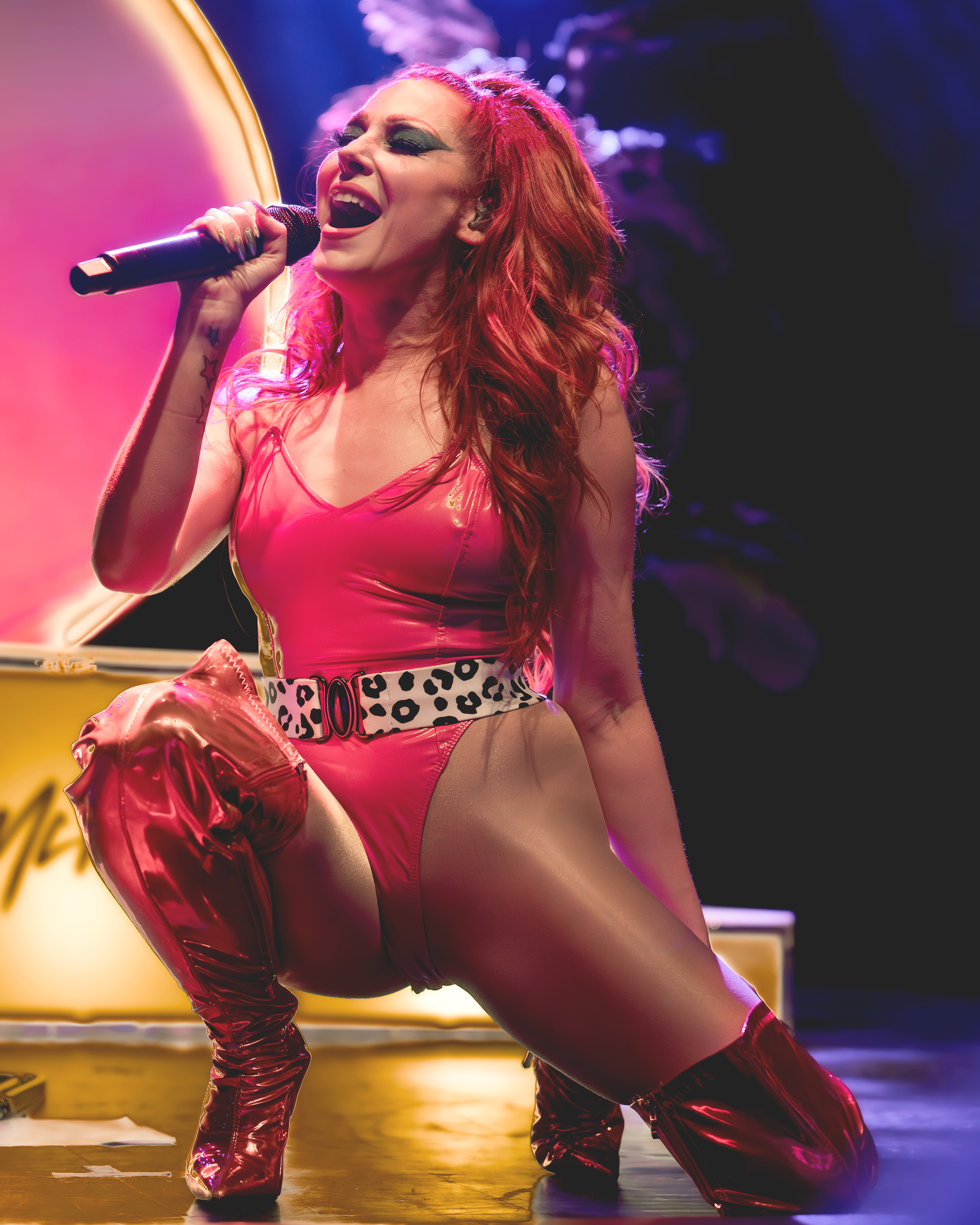
- McKee performing at the El Rey Theatre in 2025
- Studio albums: 2
- EPs: 3
- Singles: 25
- Music videos: 25
- Promotional singles: 3

American singer and songwriter Bonnie McKee has released two studio albums, two extended plays, 18 singles (and seven as a featured artist), three promotional singles, and 25 music videos.

== Studio albums ==
Title	Album details
Trouble	Released: September 28, 2004; Label: Reprise; Format: CD, digital download
Hot City	Released: May 31, 2024; Label: Self-published; Format: CD, LP, digital download

== Extended plays ==
Title	EP details	Peaks	
Title	EP details	US Heat	US Ind.
Bonnie McKee	Released: December 9, 2003; Label: Reprise; Format: CD, digital download	—	—
Bombastic	Released: June 30, 2015; Label: Self-published; Format: CD, LP, digital download	13	46
California Winter	Released: December 17, 2024; Label: Self-published (digital), A&M (physical); Format: CD, LP, digital download	—	—
"—" denotes a release that failed to chart or was not released in that territory.

== Singles ==
=== As lead artist ===
List of singles, with selected chart positions
Title	Year	Peak chart positions								Album
Title	Year	US	US Pop	US Adult Pop	AUS	CAN	GER	KOR	NZ	Album
"Trouble"	2004	—	—	—	—	—	—	—	—	Trouble
"Somebody"	2004	—	—	39	—	—	—	—	—	Trouble
"American Girl"	2013	87	25	37	51	44	82	41	39	Hot City
"California Winter"	2014	—	—	–	—	—	—	—	—	California Winter
"Bombastic"	2015	—	—	—	—	—	—	—	—	Bombastic
"I Want It All" (featuring Vicetone)	2016	—	—	—	—	—	—	—	—	Bombastic
"Stars in Your Heart"	2016	—	—	—	—	—	—	—	—	Hot City
"Thorns"	2017	—	—	—	—	—	—	—	—	Non-album single
"Sleepwalker"	2018	—	—	—	—	—	—	—	—	Hot City
"Mad Mad World"	2018	—	—	—	—	—	—	—	—	Non-album singles
"Lovely" (with August 08)	2019	—	—	—	—	—	—	—	—	Non-album singles
"Bad Girls Go to Heaven" (with Eden xo)	2019	—	—	—	—	—	—	—	—	Non-album singles
"Slay"	2023	—	—	—	—	—	—	—	—	Hot City
"Hot City"	2023	—	—	—	—	—	—	—	—	Hot City
"Don't Get Mad Get Famous"	2023	—	—	—	—	—	—	—	—	Hot City
"Jenny's Got a Boyfriend"	2024	—	—	—	—	—	—	—	—	Hot City
"Forever 21"	2025	—	—	—	—	—	—	—	—	Hot City
"Electric Heaven" (featuring Kiesza)	2025	—	—	—	—	—	—	—	—	Hot City
"Heaven Is a Gay Bar" (with Zee Machine)	2026	—	—	—	—	—	—	—	—	Non-album single
"—" denotes a recording that failed to chart or was not released in that territory.

=== As featured artist ===
Title	Year	Peaks		Album
Title	Year	US Dance Air.	BEL (FL)	Album
"Boy Hangover" (Lester Lewis featuring Bonnie McKee)	2009	—	—	Non-album single
"Thunder" (Rusko featuring Bonnie McKee)	2012	—	—	Songs
"Afroki" (Steve Aoki and Afrojack featuring Bonnie McKee)	2014	—	—	Neon Future I
"Lonely for You" (Armin van Buuren featuring Bonnie McKee)	2019	36	30	Balance
"Ferocious" ( LVCRFT featuring Bonnie McKee)	2020	—	—	The Sequel
"Dressed to Kill" ( LVCRFT featuring Bonnie McKee)	2020	—	—	The Sequel
"Lookin 4 Trouble" ( LVCRFT featuring Bonnie McKee)	2021	—	—	The Return
"Runaways" (The Midnight featuring Bonnie McKee)	2025	—	—	Syndicate
"Libra (Fairest of Them All)" (Retrograde The Musical featuring Bonnie McKee)	2025	—	—	Retrograde The Musical (Studio Cast Recording)
"Hella Good" (Trixie Mattel featuring Bonnie McKee)	2026	—	—	Non-album single

=== Promotional singles ===
Title	Year	Peaks	Album
Title	Year	US Dance	Album
"Riding Shotgun" (Kygo and Oliver Nelson featuring Bonnie McKee)	2017	27	Kids in Love
"Kick Your Shoes Off" (Royalties Cast featuring Bonnie McKee)	2020	—	Royalties: Season 1 (Music from the Original Quibi Series)
"Rendezvous" (with Montmartre and Ghenda)	2024	—	None

== Special releases ==
These songs were released onto McKee's Myspace account on November 26, 2008.

Title	Year	Notes
"Worst in Me"	2008	Re-recorded and included on the album Hot City (2024).
"Thunder"	2008	Original version of the dubstep single released by Rusko featuring McKee from his second album Songs.
"To Find You"*	2008	Recorded and used as a bonus track on the Japanese version of Lea Michele's first album Louder.

== Music videos ==
Title	Year	Director(s)
"Trouble"	2004	Wayne Isham
"Somebody" (first version)	2004	Wayne Isham
"Somebody"	2004	Meiert Avis
"Mine"	2009	Joel Tinker
"American Girl" (celebrity lip-sync version)	2013	Various
"American Girl"	2013	Justin Francis
"Sleepwalker"	2013	Patrick Hoelck
"Hallelujah"	2013	Dan O'Sullivan
"California Winter"	2014	Dan O'Sullivan and Kat Burns
"Bombastic"	2015	David Richardson
"Afroki" (Steve Aoki and Afrojack featuring Bonnie McKee)	2015	Tim Hendrix
"Wasted Youth"	2016	Darren Craig
"I Want It All"	2016	Darren Craig
"Easy"	2016	David Richardson
"Stud Muffin"	2016	Ben Spink
"Stars in Your Heart"	2016	David Richardson
"Thorns"	2017	Darren Craig
"Have Yourself a Merry Fucking Christmas"	2017	Darren Craig
"Lonely for You" (Armin van Buuren featuring Bonnie McKee)	2019	Soulvizion
"Lovely"	2019	Bonnie McKee and Bunny Lowe
"Slay"	2023	Bonnie McKee
"Hot City"	2023	Joe DeSantis and Bonnie McKee
"Don't Get Mad Get Famous"	2023	Bonnie McKee
"Jenny's Got a Boyfriend"	2024	David Richardson and Bonnie McKee
"Forever 21"	2024	David Richardson and Bonnie McKee

== See also ==
- List of songs written by Bonnie McKee
