= List of songs written by Bonnie McKee =

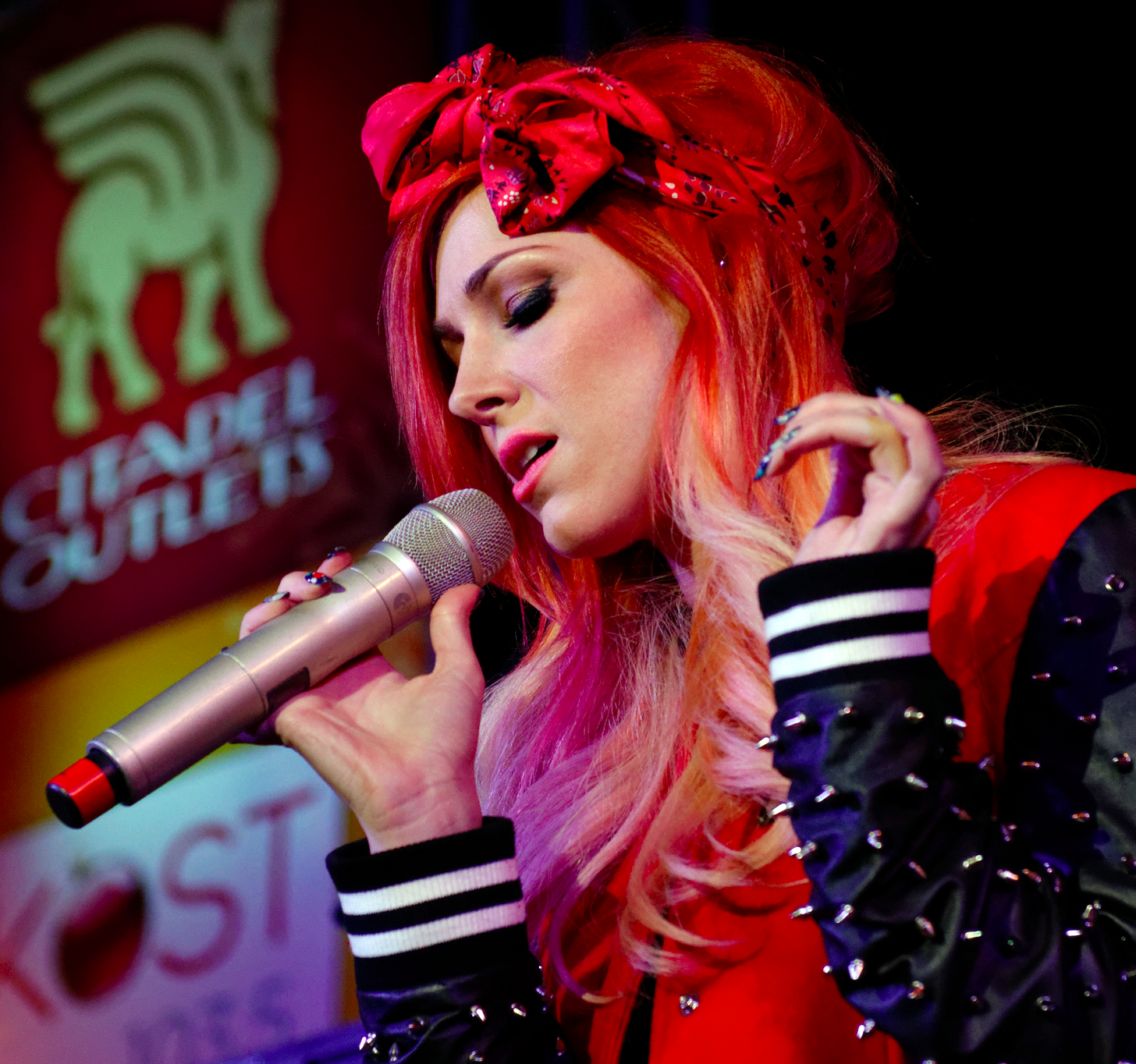
McKee performing live in Commerce, California in November 2013

American singer and songwriter Bonnie McKee has co-written eight number-one singles, which have sold more than 30 million copies worldwide combined. Her debut album Trouble was released in September 2004. She singlehandedly wrote all but one song on the album, some when she was 14 and 15 years old. A standalone single, "American Girl," was released in 2013. An album was due for release in spring of 2014 but, by the end of the year, had not yet materialized. Instead, an EP, Bombastic was released in June 2015.

McKee also has over 51 songwriting credits for songs that have been recorded by other artists. Eight of these have topped either the British or the American charts. McKee has collaborated with pop singer Katy Perry, and the pair have written five of Perry's number-one singles together: "California Gurls", "Teenage Dream", "Last Friday Night (T.G.I.F.)", "Part of Me" and "Roar". McKee has also written four other songs recorded by Perry. She co-wrote five songs on Britney Spears' seventh studio album Femme Fatale, including "Hold It Against Me", which topped the Billboard Hot 100. McKee has co-written two singles that reached the number-one position on the UK Singles Chart: "Dynamite" by Taio Cruz and "How We Do (Party)" by Rita Ora. In 2012, McKee co-wrote three songs on Adam Lambert's album Trespassing and two songs for Kesha's album Warrior, "C'Mon" and "Supernatural", the former of which served as the second single from the record. She also co-wrote two songs that appear on Leona Lewis' album Glassheart, including the album's second single "Lovebird". McKee has also co-written songs that have been recorded by Christina Aguilera, Kelly Clarkson, Cher, Carly Rae Jepsen and Ellie Goulding among others.

== Songs ==
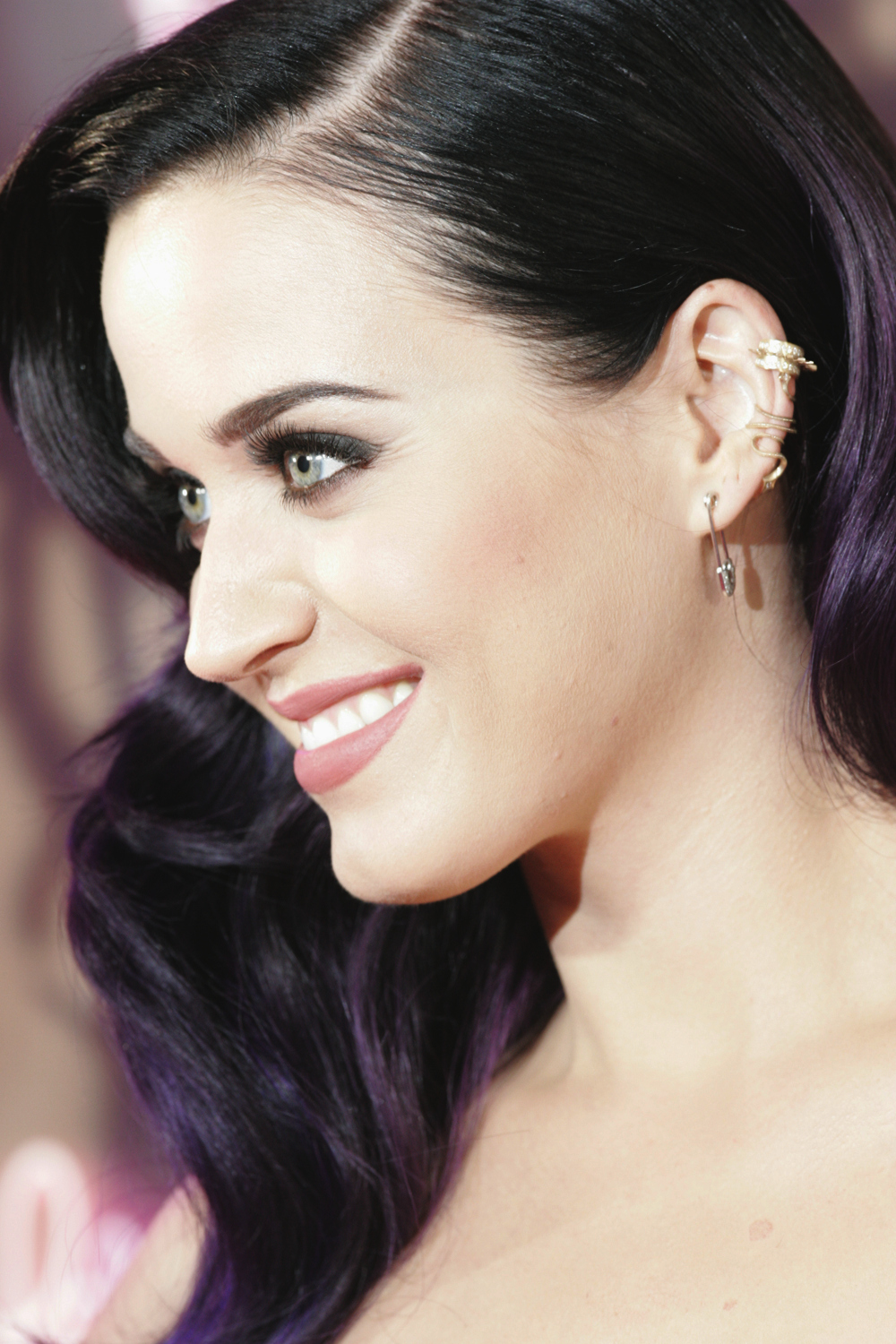
McKee has co-written nine songs with Katy Perry, five of which have gone number one.

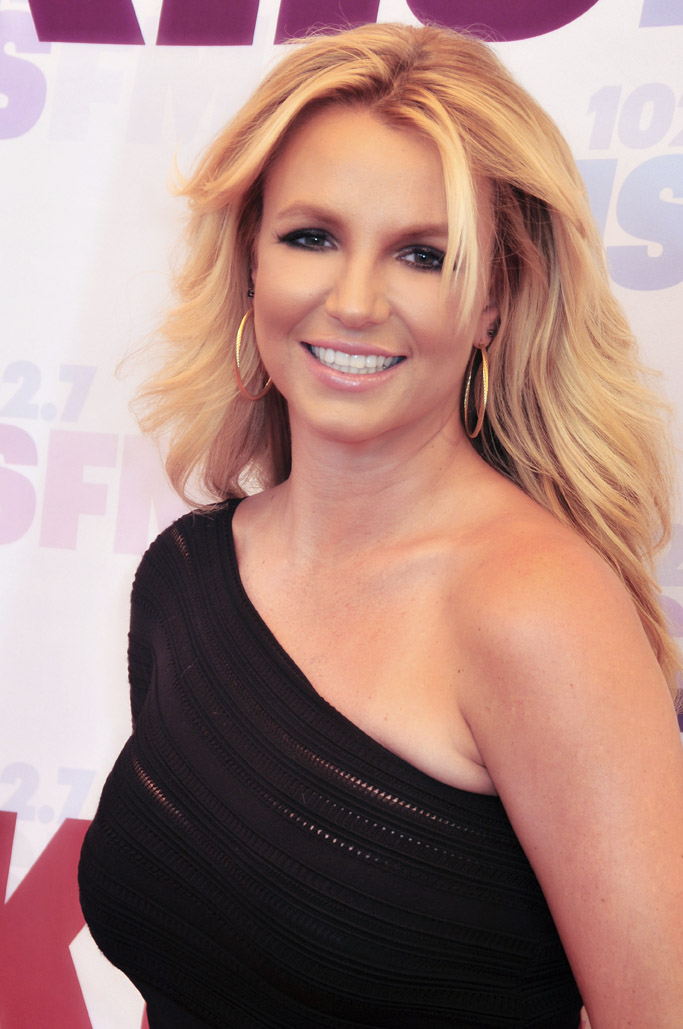
McKee wrote five songs for Britney Spears' 2011 album Femme Fatale, as well as the song "Ooh La La".

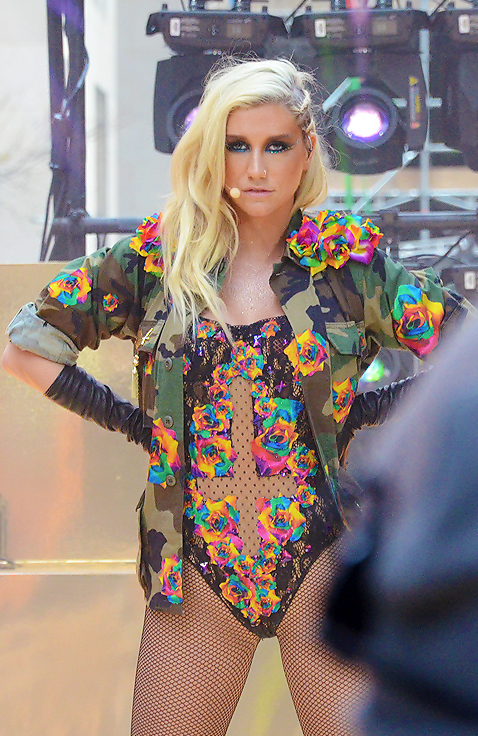
Two songs from Kesha's second studio album Warrior were co-written with McKee, including the single "C'Mon".

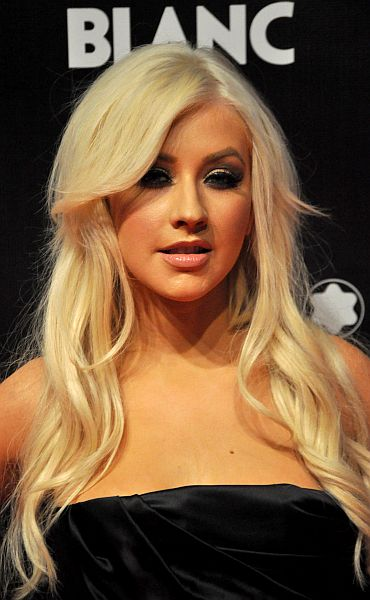
McKee is a co-writer of Christina Aguilera's 2013 promotional single "Let There Be Love".

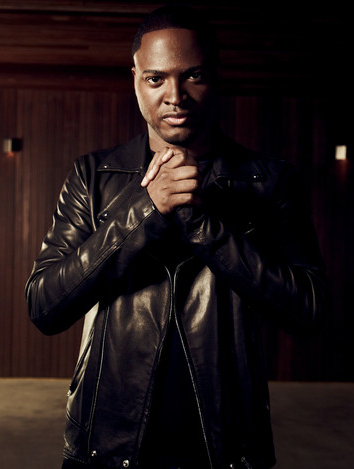
Taio Cruz's song "Dynamite" was co-written by McKee.

Key
†	Indicates single release
#	Indicates song that topped the US Billboard Hot 100
§	Indicates song that topped the UK Singles Chart

Song	Artist(s)	Writer(s)	Album	Year	Ref.
"Afroki" †	Steve Aoki & Afrojack featuring Bonnie McKee	Bonnie McKee; Nick Van De Wall	Neon Future I	2014	
"Alone"	Kelly Clarkson	Josh Abraham; Oliver Goldstein; Bonnie McKee; Ryan Williams	Stronger	2011	
"American Girl" †	Bonnie McKee	Oliver Goldstein; Jon Asher; Garrett Lee; Bonnie McKee; Alex Metric	—N/a	2013	
"American Youth French Kissing" †	Eden xo	Bonnie McKee; Eden xo Jordan Palmer	—N/a	2020	
"Bad Reputation"	Kelly Clarkson	Kelly Clarkson; Kelly Sheehan; Greg Kurstin; Bonnie McKee	Piece by Piece	2015	
"Birthday" †	Katy Perry	Lukasz Gottwald; Max Martin; Bonnie McKee; Katy Perry; Henry Walter	Prism	2013	
"Bombastic" †	Bonnie McKee	Bonnie McKee; Charlie Puth; Sean Walsh; Axident	Bombastic	2015	
"Breaking Point"	—N/a	Kate Alana Akhurst; Bonnie McKee; Vince Pizzinga	—N/a	Unknown	
"C'Mon" †	Kesha	Lukasz Gottwald; Benjamin Levin; Max Martin; Bonnie McKee; Kesha Sebert; Henry Walter	Warrior	2013	
"California Gurls" † # §	Katy Perry featuring Snoop Dogg	Snoop Dogg; Lukasz Gottwald; Katy Perry; Benjamin Levin; Mike Love; Max Martin; Bonnie McKee; Brian Wilson	Teenage Dream	2010	
"California Winter"	Bonnie McKee	Bonnie McKee; Charlie Puth; Sean Walsh	—N/a	2014	
"Choke Hold"	Adam Lambert	Josh Abraham; Oliver Goldstein; Adam Lambert; Bonnie McKee	Trespassing	2012	
"Cold Heart"	Elliott Yamin	Felix Bloxsom; Aaron Goldstein; Oliver Goldstein; Bonnie McKee; Elliott Yamin	Fight for Love	2009	
"Cold Summer"	—N/a	Heather Bright; Bonnie McKee; Lee McCutcheon	—N/a	Unknown	
"Confessions of a Teenage Girl"	Bonnie McKee	Bonnie McKee	Trouble	2004	
"Cuckoo"	Adam Lambert	Josh Abraham; Oliver Goldstein; Adam Lambert; Bonnie McKee; Anne Preven	Trespassing	2012	
"Daddy Like" †	Dorian Electra	Bonnie McKee; Dorian Electra; Dylan Brady; Michael Zarowny; Peter John Shepard-Vanoudenaren	Flamboyant	2019	
"Dance for Me"	—N/a	Gary Clark; Julian Hamilton; Bonnie McKee	—N/a	Unknown	
"Dumb Blonde"	Avril Lavigne	Avril Lavigne; Onika Maraj; Mitch Allan; Bonnie McKee	Head Above Water	2019	
"Dynamite" † §	Taio Cruz	Taio Cruz; Lukasz Gottwald; Benjamin Levin; Max Martin; Bonnie McKee	Rokstarr	2010	
"Easy"	Bonnie McKee	Bonnie McKee; Andreas Schuller; James Wong	Bombastic	2015	
"Electric Heaven"	—N/a	Joakim Åhlund; Bonnie McKee; Jonathon Newman	—N/a	Unknown	
"Erase"	The Chainsmokers featuring Priyanka Chopra	Bonnie McKee	—N/a	2012	
"Flashback"	—N/a	Andreas Levander; Bonnie McKee; Fredro Odesjo	—N/a	Unknown	
"Gasoline"	Britney Spears	Lukasz Gottwald; Claude Kelly; Benjamin Levin; Bonnie McKee; Emily Wright	Femme Fatale	2011	
"Ghost"	Katy Perry	Lukasz Gottwald; Max Martin; Bonnie McKee; Katy Perry; Henry Walter	Prism	2013	
"Girls Night Out"	—N/a	Bonnie McKee; Kristian Ottestad	—N/a	Unknown	
"Good Outweigh the Bad"	Elliott Yamin	Jamie Almos; Oliver Goldstein; Bonnie McKee; Ely Weisfeld; Elliott Yamin	Fight for Love	2009	
"Green Grass"	Bonnie McKee	Bonnie McKee	Trouble	2004	
"Guilty Pleasure"	—N/a	Josh Abraham; Oliver Goldstein; Bonnie McKee	—N/a	Unknown	
"Guyliner, Pt. 2"	Dorian Electra	Dorian Electra; Dylan Brady; Michael Zarowny; Bonnie McKee	Flamboyant	2020	
"Heart Wants What It Wants" †	Bebe Rexha	Liana Banks; Ray Goren; Jussifer; Bonnie McKee; Bebe Rexha; Sarah Solovay; Ryan Williamson; Ido Zmishlany	Bebe	2023	
"Heatwave"	Britney Spears	Bonnie McKee; Max Martin	—N/a	Unknown	
"Hit Me Up"	Jem and the Holograms featuring Stefanie Scott	Joakim Åhlund; Bonnie McKee; Johnnie Newman	Jem and the Holograms (Original Motion Picture Soundtrack)	2015	
"Hitman"	—N/a	Joakim Åhlund; Bonnie McKee	—N/a	Unknown	
"Hold It Against Me" † #	Britney Spears	Lukasz Gottwald; Mathieu Jomphe; Bonnie McKee; Martin Sandberg	Femme Fatale	2011	
"Honey"	Bonnie McKee	Bonnie McKee	Trouble	2004	
"Hot and Heavy"	—N/a	Bonnie McKee; Travis Mills; Fraser T Smith	—N/a	Unknown	
"How I Roll"	Britney Spears	Henrik Jonback; Christian Karlsson; Magnus Lidehäll; Bonnie McKee; Nicole Morier; Pontus Winnberg	Femme Fatale	2011	
"How We Do (Party)" † §	Rita Ora	Andre Davidson; Sean Davidson; Hal Davis; Alexander Delicata; Berry Gordy Jr. Andrew Harr; Osten Harvy Jr. Willie Hutch; Jermaine Jackson; Bonnie McKee; Kelly Sheehan; Christopher Wallace; Bob West	ORA	2012	
"I Am Woman"	—N/a	Blair Daly; Meghan Kabir; Bonnie McKee	—N/a	Unknown	
"I Dare You"	Bonnie McKee featuring Ina Wroldsen	Bonnie McKee; Fraser T Smith; Ina Wroldsen	—N/a	2011	
"I Don't Care" † §	Cheryl	Joakim Åhlund; Bonnie McKee; John Newman	Only Human	2014	
"I Don't Have to Sleep to Dream"	Cher	Christopher Godbey; Jerome Harmon; Bonnie McKee; Timothy Mosley; Kelly Sheehan	Closer to the Truth	2013	
"I Hold Her"	Bonnie McKee	Bonnie McKee	Trouble	2004	
"I Like It Hot"	—N/a	Bonnie McKee; Rune Westberg	—N/a	Unknown	
"If That's Love" (Note: Although not released, "If That's Love" was featured in an episode of CSI: Miami which starred Lucy Hale, in which her character lip-synced the song.)	Bonnie McKee	Jesse Astin; Bonnie McKee; Blake Robin	—N/a	2010	
"Inside Out"	Britney Spears	Lukasz Gottwald; Jacob Kasher; Mathieu Jomphe; Max Martin; Bonnie McKee	Femme Fatale	2011	
"I Want It All"	Bonnie McKee	Bonnie McKee; Oliver Goldstein; Greg Kurstin; Sean Walsh	Bombastic	2015	
"January"	Bonnie McKee	Bonnie McKee	Trouble	2004	
"Kick Us Out" †	Hyper Crush	Angelina Araya; Niles Hollowell-Dhar; Steven Love; Bonnie McKee; Nicole Morier; Patrick Ridge; David Vine	—N/a	2010	
"Laserbeam"	—N/a	Martin Peter Harrington; Bonnie McKee	—N/a	Unknown	
"Last Friday Night (T.G.I.F.)" † #	Katy Perry	Lukasz Gottwald; Katy Perry; Bonnie McKee; Martin Karl Sandberg	Teenage Dream	2010	
"Legendary Lovers"	Katy Perry	Lukasz Gottwald; Max Martin; Bonnie McKee; Katy Perry; Henry Walter	Prism	2013	
"Let's Go (Turn It Up)"	Fefe Dobson	Josh Abraham; Fefe Dobson; Oliver Goldstein; Bonnie McKee; Luke Walker	—N/a	2010	
"Let There Be Love"	Christina Aguilera	Jakob Erixson; Oliver Goldstein; Oscar Holter; Max Martin; Bonnie McKee; Karl Johan Schuster	Lotus	2012	
"Lipstick Revolution" (Note: Although not released, "Lipstick Revolution" was featured in an episode of Make It Or Break It.)	Bonnie McKee	Bonnie McKee; Simon Perry	—N/a	Unknown	
"Lonestar"	—N/a	Gary Clark; Bonnie McKee; Kelly Sheehan	—N/a	Unknown	
"Long Distance" †	Melanie Amaro	Dernst Emile; Michael Joseph Green; Bonnie McKee; Anne Preven; Christopher Stewart	Truly	2012	
"Lovebird" †	Leona Lewis	Joshua Coleman; Lukasz Gottwald; Bonnie McKee	Glassheart	2012	
"Make It Happen" †	Namie Amuro featuring Afterschool	Jorgen Elofsson; Erik Lidbom; Bonnie McKee	Checkmate!	2011	
"Map"	Adam Lambert	Josh Abraham; Oliver Goldstein; Adam Lambert; Bonnie McKee; Anne Preven	Trespassing	2012	
"Message in a Bottle"	—N/a	Heather Bright; Allan Grigg; Bonnie McKee	—N/a	Unknown	
"Naked" †	Ava Max	Ava Max; Bonnie McKee; Henry Walter; Eden xo Parrish Warrington; Diederik van Elsas	Heaven & Hell (Ava Max album)	2020	
"Ooh La La" †	Britney Spears	Lola Blanc; Joshua Coleman; Lukasz Gottwald; Fransisca Hall; Jacob Kasher; Bonnie McKee; Henry Walter	Music from and Inspired by The Smurfs 2	2013	
"Open Your Eyes"	Bonnie McKee	Bonnie McKee; Mark Batson	Trouble	2004	
"Paper Doll"	Sky Ferreira	Josh Abraham; Sky Ferreira; Oliver Goldstein; Bonnie McKee	—N/a	2010	
"Part of Me" † # §	Katy Perry	Lukasz Gottwald; Katy Perry; Bonnie McKee; Martin Sandberg	Teenage Dream: The Complete Confection	2012	
"Roar" † # §	Katy Perry	Lukasz Gottwald; Max Martin; Bonnie McKee; Katy Perry; Henry Walter	Prism	2013	
"Rules of Attraction"	Bonnie McKee	Bonnie McKee; Fraser T Smith; Ina Wroldsen	—N/a	2011	
"Runaways"	The Midnight featuring Bonnie McKee	Tyler Lyle; Tim McEwan; Bonnie McKee	Syndicate	2025	
"Sayonara"	Miranda Cosgrove	Greg Kurstin; Bonnie McKee; Nicole Morier	High Maintenance	2011	
"Seal It With a Kiss"	Britney Spears	Lukasz Gottwald; Max Martin; Bonnie McKee; Henry Walter	Femme Fatale	2011	
"Sensitive Subject Matter"	Bonnie McKee	Bonnie McKee	Trouble	2004	
"Shadow"	Nikki & Rich	Nikki Leonti; Bonnie McKee; Rich Velonskis	—N/a	2011	
"SLAY" †	Bonnie McKee	Bonnie Mckee; Gary Go; Jamie Rise; John Newman; Oliver Goldstein; Sam Hollander	—N/a	2023	
"Sleepwalker" (Note: Although not released as an official single, "Sleepwalker" served as a promotional single with a music video.)	Bonnie McKee	Moritz Friedrich; Bonnie McKee; Alexander Ridha	—N/a	2013	
"So Shallow"	—N/a	Jorgen Elofsson; Erik Lidbom; Bonnie McKee	—N/a	Unknown	
"Somebody" †	Bonnie McKee	Bonnie McKee	Trouble	2004	
"Stay Right Here"	Adam Lambert	Josh Abraham; Oliver Goldstein; Adam Lambert; Bonnie McKee; Ryan Williams	—N/a	Unknown	
"Supernatural"	Kesha	Lukasz Gottwald; Nik Kershaw; Max Martin; Bonnie McKee; Kesha Sebert; Henry Walter	Warrior	2012	
"Teenage Dream" † #	Katy Perry	Lukasz Gottwald; Katy Perry; Benjamin Levin; Bonnie McKee; Martin Sandberg	Teenage Dream	2010	
"Thanks for Nothing"	Fefe Dobson	Josh Abraham; Fefe Dobson; Bonnie McKee; Luke Walker	Joy	2010	
"There Will Be Tears"	Miranda Cosgrove	Joshua Coleman; Allan Grigg; Bonnie McKee	Sparks Fly	2010	
"Thunder" (Note: "Thunder" is a remix of McKee's song "Thunder Of My Heartbeat".)	Rusko featuring Bonnie McKee	Ted E Burner; Bonnie McKee; Christopher William Mercer	Songs	2012	
"Thunder of My Heartbeat"	Bonnie McKee	Ted E Burner; Bonnie McKee; Oliver Goldstein	—N/a	Unknown	
"Tomorrow Never Dies"	Nicole Scherzinger	Alexander Delicata; Andrew Harr; Jermaine Jackson; Bonnie McKee; Kelly Sheehan	Killer Love	2011	
"Touch and Go"	Sky Ferreira	Josh Abraham; Sky Ferreira; Oliver Goldstein; Bonnie McKee; Luke Walker	—N/a	2010	
"Touch Me"	Smash Cast	Brent Kutzle; Bonnie McKee; Ryan Tedder; Noel Zancanella	The Music of Smash	2012	
"Trouble" †	Bonnie McKee	Bonnie McKee	Trouble	2004	
"Turn Me Up"	Carly Rae Jepsen	Josh Abraham; Oliver Goldstein; Carly Rae Jepsen; Kevin Maher; Bonnie McKee	Kiss	2012	
"Un Love Me"	Leona Lewis	Leona Lewis; Bonnie McKee; Kelly Sheehan; Fraser T Smith	Glassheart	2012	
"Under Control"	Ellie Goulding	Ellie Goulding; Oliver Goldstein; Bonnie McKee; Corey Nitta	Halcyon Days	2013	
"Up All Night"	Charlie Puth	Charlie Puth; Bonnie McKee; Thomas Troelsen; Giorgio Tuinfort	Nine Track Mind	2016	
"Vacation" †	G.R.L.	Lukasz Gottwald; Max Martin; Bonnie McKee; Henry Walter	—N/a	2013	
"Voice That Carries"	Bonnie McKee	Bonnie McKee	Trouble	2004	
"Wasted Youth"	Bonnie McKee	Bonnie McKee; John Newman; Sean Walsh	Bombastic	2015	
"When I'm Alone"	f(x)	Bonnie McKee; Matt Radosevich; Steve Robson; Carly Rae Jepsen; Hwang Hyun (MonoTree)	4 Walls	2015	
"When It All Comes Down"	Bonnie McKee	Bonnie McKee	Trouble	2004	
"Wide Awake" †	Katy Perry	Lukasz Gottwald; Max Martin; Bonnie McKee; Katy Perry; Henry Walter	Teenage Dream: The Complete Confection	2012	
"Wish U Were Here" †	Cody Simpson featuring Becky G	Taio Cruz; Becky Gomez; Lukasz Gottwald; Bonnie McKee; Henry Walter	Paradise	2012	
"Worst in Me"	Leighton Meester	Oliver Goldstein; Bonnie McKee	—N/a	2009	
"You're the Only One for Me"	Kelly Clarkson	Josh Abraham; Kelly Clarkson; Oliver Goldstein; Bonnie McKee	—N/a	Unknown	
"Your Love's a Drug" †	Leighton Meester	Josh Abraham; Shahine Ezell; Oliver Goldstein; Bonnie McKee; Leighton Meester	—N/a	2010	
