= Restricted (DJ) =

Australian DJ and record producer (born 1999)

- Born: Rhys Sfyrios; December 11, 1999 (age 26); Adelaide. Australia
- Genres: Hard Techno; Hardstyle; Melbourne Bounce (early)
- Occupations: DJ; Record Producer
- Years active: 2019–present
- Label: Revive Records
- Website: itsrestricted.com

Rhys Sfyrios (born December 11, 1999), better known by his stage name Restricted, is an Australian electronic musician and disk jockey. He mainly performs hardstyle and hard techno.

Restricted has played at music festivals such as Ultra Music Festival Australia, Parookaville, Airbeat One, EDC Vegas, Teletech, Creamfields and Dreamstate.

== Early life ==
Restricted was born in Adelaide, South Australia, and is of Greek descent. He was introduced to electronic dance music at age 12 or 13, after his older brothers would host pre-drinks at their home with their friends. From these parties, he recalls hearing artists from the Melbourne Bounce scene, such as Will Sparks, as well as more globally popular EDM acts from the time, such as Martin Garrix and Showtek.

== Career ==
Restricted started DJing when he was around 14 or 15, usually at small parties and private venues. When he turned 18, he had various DJ residencies around his home city. His music blends techno, hard dance and hardstyle influences together into a unique mix, which critics have described as versatile. In an interview, he claims one of his key artistic missions is to break down the barrier between the underground scene and mainstages, making EDM sub-genres more accessible to broader audiences.

In 2021, following the release and popularity of Squid Game, a television series which attracted mainstream attention, Restricted released an EDM version of the song sung by the giant robot girl from the first episode "Red Light, Green Light". The chant "mugunghwa kochi pieot seumnida (the hibuscus flower has bloomed)" can be heard in a track which first gained traction on TikTok, and was described as minimal techno. The song was later released on Restricted's Soundcloud account, garnering almost 1 million streams.

Throughout the earlier stages of his career, in the early 2020s, Restricted debuted a number of new tracks on short-form social media platform TikTok. He pushed lots of material on the platform, using online reactions to guide where his musical production would lead him. This led to some of his most successful hits, such as "Big Jet Plane" (a remix of the Angus & Julia Stone song of the same name), "Love Tonight", "Captain" and "Bonanza".

In 2023, his track "Big Jet Plane" became popular in Central Europe, reaching high positions on the German and Polish popular charts.

In 2024, Restricted founded the record label Revive Records. "Tunnel Vision" (with Nik Sitz) was the first song released on the label, described by critics as a fierce fusion between hard techno and hardstyle. The track went on to see immense popularity, was played by several other hard techno artists in the scene, and eventually resulted in a Remix EP, featuring five artists take on the track.

At the commencement of the following year, in 2025, Restricted released two hardstyle collaborations: "WTF?" with compatriot producer Anderex, and "FACE 2 FACE" with Scottish duo Rebelion. The former track was inspired by Nico Moreno & Warface collaboration "2 Be High", which captivated both techno and hardstyle crowds. The track was released on Verknipt Records, instead of his own label, owing to its harder, heavier, and more industrial sound than his normal releases, due to the influence of his collaborator. Later in the year, another hardstyle-themed collaboration dropped, "Pump This Party", alongside Mexican producer Junkie Kid. The track takes influence from older hardstyle acts, but adds modern hard techno elements, such as industrial kicks and fake drops.

== Discography ==
=== Releases ===
- "For You" (2019)
- "Mosquito" (with Miljay, 2019)
- "Insidious" (with Adronity, 2020)
- "Rapture" (2021)
- "Stamp" (2021)
- "Sensation" (2022)
- "Don't Be Scared" (2022)
- "Astronaut" (2022)
- "Big Jet Plane" (2022)
- "Sleepless" (with Topic featuring GoldFord, 2023)
- "Lover" (with Amen! UK, 2023)
- "Party People" (with Nik Sitz and 89ers, 2024)
- "Insomnia" (with NIKSTER, 2024)
- "Tunnel Vision" (with Nik Sitz, 2024)
- "Smells Like Teen Spirit" (2024)
- "Hardcore (give me a mfkn breakbeat)" (2024)
- "FCKN LOUD" (with Vortek's, 2024)
- "Rockin to the Rhythm" (2025)
- "WTF?" (with Anderex, 2025)
- "DANCE NOW" (with Stretch, 2025)
- "Destination Unknown" (2025)
- "Pump This Party" (with Junkie Kid, 2025)
- "FOREVER X SAY MY NAME" (with Hardsok, 2025)
- "Crowd Operator" (2026)
- "DON'T WANNA MISS THIS" (with TOZA, 2026)
- "Kick Drum Talk" (with Anderex, 2026)

=== Featured singles ===
- "Get Me Out" (with Orkestrated, 2020)
- "The Den" (with Joel Fletcher featuring Masked Wolf, 2020)
- "Here We F*n Masterblade" (with OverDrive, 2020)
- "With You (Sunset Mix)" (with Krunk!, 2021)
- "Mandra" (with Krunk!, 2021)
- "Mercy" (with SaberZ, 2021)
- "The Chant" (with Dimatik featuring Savage, 2022)
- "Perfect (Exceeder)" (with Timmy Trumpet, 2024)
- "Dirty Rave" (with Ben Nicky, 2024)
- "Face 2 Face" (with Rebelion, 2025)

=== Remixes ===
- 2020: Robert DeLong - "Global Concepts" (Restricted Edit)
- 2020: Bonnie McKee - "Mad Mad World" (Restricted Edit)
- 2020: CJ - "WHOOPTY" (Restricted Edit)
- 2021: Tion Wayne and Russ Millions - "Body 2" (Restricted Edit)
- 2021: Michael Jackson - "Thriller" (Restricted Edit)
- 2021: "Squid Game" (Restricted Edit)
- 2021: Kanye West - "Praise God" (Restricted Edit)
- 2022: Nutcase22 - "Captain" (Restricted Remix)
- 2022: Belters Only featuring Jazzy - "Make Me Feel Good" (Restricted Remix)
- 2022: Central Cee - "Loading" (Joel Fletcher and Restricted Bootleg)
- 2022: Britney Spears - "Toxic" (Restricted Edit)
- 2022: Ellie Goulding - "Lights" (Restricted Edit)
- 2022: Rnbstylerz - "Like Wooh Wooh" (Restricted Edit)
- 2022: Fred again and Swedish House Mafia featuring Future - "Turn On The Lights again..." (Restricted Edit)
- 2022: OneRepublic - "I Ain't Worried" (Restricted Edit)
- 2022: Mo-Do - "Eins Zewi Polizei" (Restricted Edit)
- 2023: Faithless - "Insomnia" (Restricted and NIKSTER Edit)
- 2023: Oliver Tree and Robin Schulz - "Miss You" (Restricted Edit)
- 2023: Day1 - "MBAPPÉ" (Restricted and Sunset Bros Edit)
- 2023: Mr President - "Coco Jambo" (Restricted Edit)
- 2023: Black Eyed Peas - "Pump It" (Restricted Edit)
- 2024: Kanye West and Ty Dolla Sign - "Carnival" (Restricted Edit)
- 2024: Jaxomy x Agatino Romero x Raffaella Carrà - "Pedro" (Restricted and Nik Sitz Edit)
- 2024: Borai and Denham Audio - "Make Me" (Restricted Edit)
- 2025: David Guetta featuring Akon - "Sexy Bitch" (Restricted and Nik Sitz Edit)
