= California Winter (song) =

Song by Bonnie McKee
- Released: December 18, 2014
- Recorded: 2014
- Genre: Christmas pop
- Label: Bonnie McKee Music
- Songwriters: Bonnie McKee; Charlie Puth; Sean Walsh
- Producer: Sean Walsh

Bonnie McKee chronology
"American Girl" (2013)	"California Winter" (2014)	"Bombastic" (2015)

"California Winter" is a song by American singer-songwriter Bonnie McKee. The song was independently released to digital outlets on December 18, 2014.

It was McKee's first independent release since leaving Epic Records.

On December 18, 2024, ten years later its original release, and in the wave of new releases by McKee following the launch of her long-awaited sophomore album, Hot City, the American singer released a Christmas EP, titled after the track, featuring it as in both the original version and also as a re-recorded duet with American country singer Matt Rogers, plus other four tracks, including a cover of Canadian singer and songwriter Leonard Cohen's 1984 single and posterior signature hit, "Hallelujah," and two cover versions of the 1944 Christmas classic ballad first introduced by Judy Garland, "Have Yourself a Merry Little Christmas", being one close to Garland's original and the other with explicit lyrics, through streaming music platforms.

== Music video ==
The music video for "California Winter" was released on December 20, 2014. Directed by Dan O'Sullivan, the video was filmed in a single continuous shot. Preparation for the shoot began less than a week prior, with the choreography learned the day before and costumes finalized on the day of filming. The team transformed an empty room into a festive set, completing six takes, with the final cut being the last take. McKee described the effort as a "Christmas Miracle".

A year later in 2015, a remixed music video was released in a variety special titled "California Winter Extravaganza".

== Reception ==
Michelle McGahan of PopCrush praised "California Winter" as an upbeat, festive track, highlighting its potential to become a holiday season favorite in 2014. Critics have noted the song's bubbly nature, festive elements like references to "cinnamon candles," and prominent jingle bells. McGahan compared McKee's vocal performance to a mix of Ariana Grande, Katy Perry, and Cyndi Lauper.
