= Stars in Your Heart =

Single by Bonnie McKee
- Released: December 16, 2016
- Recorded: 2008, 2013–2014
- Genre: Lounge pop
- Length: 4:47
- Label: Bonnie McKee Music

Bonnie McKee singles chronology
"I Want It All" (2016)	"Stars in Your Heart" (2016)	"Thorns" (2017)

Music video
- "Stars in Your Heart" on YouTube

"Stars In Your Heart" is a song by American singer-songwriter Bonnie McKee. The song was independently released to digital outlets as a standalone release on December 16, 2016, and was later included on McKee's second studio album, Hot City (2024).

The original song was recorded by McKee in 2008 for her then-forthcoming second studio album under Reprise, though it was shelved. McKee later re-recorded the video during her time with Kemosabe and Sony, filming a space-inspired video in 2013 with plans to release it as a single. Following further label issues, plans for the release of the video were shelved. McKee eventually released the video as a gift to fans in December 2016.

== Background and conception ==
McKee had originally teased the song back in 2008 by posting a demo to her MySpace page alongside other songs including "Thunder", "Worst In Me", and "To Find You", all of which she intended to be on her second studio album under Reprise Records. Following her dismissal from the label, McKee worked on writing songs for other artists including Katy Perry, Britney Spears, and Kesha, obtaining eight number one hits on the Billboard Hot 100. She then signed a joint-deal with Kemosabe Records and Sony Music, releasing the single "American Girl" in the summer of 2013. Around this time, McKee had intended to release "Stars In Your Heart" as a single and filmed a video for the song, though plans never came to fruition.

Following several label complications with Sony and Kemosabe, McKee was released from her contract in 2014 and continued as an independent artist, releasing the EP Bombastic (2015). She then released several previously-teased songs including "Sleepwalker" and "Stars In Your Heart" as singles.

== Composition ==
The song is lyrically about staying with your lover and "keeping them warm" even amidst the end of the world ("when all of the magic is gone", "after the world is frozen").

== Music video ==
Inspired by "vintage" 1960s and 1970s space films such as Barbarella, the video features McKee playing the role of Bambi and David John Craig as Khron Valgard. The video begins with an homage to the famous stripping scene in the spaceship as featured in Barbarella. Various shots show McKee walking through a blue-skied icy plant where she stumbles upon a magical yellow stone, steering the spaceship in a psychedelic star-explosion filled sequence, and healing her dying lover, who then subsequently joins her in a similar Barbarella-esque stripping sequence.

The video was directed by David Richardson and edited by Christopher Bredeson. The production was filmed in 2013 and originally planned to be released that winter but saw delays due to troubles McKee was having with her label. Nylon premiered the video on their website in 2016 with McKee as a Christmas gift to her fans.

== Critical reception ==
Lucas Villa of Axis praised the song and its video, comparing the composition to that of a James Bond theme song.
