= Royalties (soundtrack) =

Soundtrack album
- Released: June 12, 2020

Royalties is a soundtrack to the 2020 television series of the same name. The full album was released on June 12, 2020.

== Track listing ==
1. “This Is a Theme Song (From Royalties)” – Darren Criss, Kether Donohue, Royalties Cast
2. “Just That Good (From Royalties)” – Rufus Wainwright, Royalties Cast
3. “Break It In (From Royalties)” – Lil Rel Howery, KingJet, Royalties Cast
4. “Let Your Hair Down (From Royalties)” – Bonnie McKee, Royalties Cast
5. “Kick Your Shoes Off (From Royalties)” – Bonnie McKee, Royalties Cast
6. “Mighty as Kong (From Royalties)” – Mark Hamill, Royalties Cast
7. “I Am So Much Better Than You at Everything (From Royalties)” – Darren Criss, Royalties Cast
8. “Make You Come True (From Royalties)” – Jordan Fisher, Royalties Cast
9. “Prizefighter (From Royalties)” – Julianne Hough, Royalties Cast
10. “Also You (From Royalties)” – Jackie Tohn, Darren Criss, Royalties Cast
11. “I Hate That I Need You (From Royalties)” – Jennifer Coolidge, NIve, Darren Criss, Royalties Cast
12. “Perfect Song (From Royalties)” – Sabrina Carpenter, Royalties Cast
