= Royalties (TV series) =

Musical comedy television series

- Genre: Musical comedy
- Created by: Darren Criss
- Written by: Matt Lang; Nick Lang
- Directed by: Amy Heckerling
- Starring: Darren Criss; Kether Donohue; Tony Revolori; Georgia King
- Original language: English
- No. of seasons: 1
- No. of episodes: 10

Production
- Executive producers: Darren Criss; Nick Lang; Matt Lang; Ricky Rollins
- Running time: 6-9 minutes

Original release
- Network: Quibi
- Release: June 1 – June 30, 2020

Royalties (stylized as ROYALTiES) is a musical comedy television series created by, executive produced by and starring Darren Criss on Quibi. Matt and Nick Lang co-write and executive produce the series. They previously collaborated with Criss in the musical theatre company StarKid Productions. The series premiered on June 1, 2020.

== Cast and characters ==
=== Main ===
- Darren Criss as Pierce
- Kether Donohue as Sara
- Tony Revolori as Theo
- Georgia King as Kendra

=== Recurring ===
- John Stamos as Elliot Peck
- Jackie Tohn as Polly Amorous
- Sabrina Carpenter as Bailey Rouge
- Jennifer Coolidge as Miriam Hale

=== Special guest appearances ===
- Rufus Wainwright as Jacob Jewel
- Lil Rel Howery as Dwayne D
- Bonnie McKee as Kimmy Kelly
- Mark Hamill as Philip Combs
- Jordan Fisher as Kissgo Muah
- Julianne Hough as Gabriella Lamboni

== Episodes ==
No.	Title	Directed by	Written by	Original release date
1	"Just That Good"	Amy Heckerling	Nick Lang & Matt Lang	June 1, 2020
2	"Break It In"	Amy Heckerling	Nick Lang & Matt Lang	June 1, 2020
3	"Kick Your Shoes Off"	Amy Heckerling	Nick Lang & Matt Lang	June 1, 2020
4	"Mighty As Kong"	Amy Heckerling	Nick Lang & Matt Lang	June 22, 2020
5	"I Am So Much Better Than You at Everything"	Amy Heckerling	Nick Lang & Matt Lang	June 23, 2020
6	"Make You Come (True)"	Amy Heckerling	Nick Lang & Matt Lang	June 24, 2020
7	"Prizefighter"	Amy Heckerling	Nick Lang & Matt Lang	June 25, 2020
8	"Also You"	Amy Heckerling	Nick Lang & Matt Lang	June 26, 2020
9	"I Hate That I Need You"	Amy Heckerling	Nick Lang & Matt Lang	June 29, 2020
10	"Perfect Song"	Amy Heckerling	Nick Lang & Matt Lang	June 30, 2020

== See also ==
- List of original programs distributed by Quibi
- Royalties (soundtrack)
