= Somebody (Bonnie McKee song) =

Single by Bonnie McKee

from the album Trouble
- Released: June 28, 2004
- Recorded: 2003
- Genre: Pop
- Length: 4:07
- Label: Reprise
- Songwriters: Bonnie McKee, Robert Ellis Orrall, Al Anderson
- Producers: Rob Cavallo, Antonina Armato

Bonnie McKee singles chronology
"Trouble" (2003)	"Somebody" (2004)	"American Girl" (2013)

Somebody is a song by American singer-songwriter Bonnie McKee from her debut album Trouble (2004). The song was written by McKee, Robert Orrall, and Al Anderson, while production was mainly handled by Rob Cavallo with help from Antonina Armato. The song was released as the second single from the album sometime during 2004. A music video was released sometime during 2004. "Somebody" was featured on the soundtrack of the 2004 film Win a Date with Tad Hamilton!, which McKee also appeared in.

== Background and release ==
=== Composition ===
The song was written by McKee, Robert Orrall, and Al Anderson, while production was mainly handled by Rob Cavallo with help from Antonina Armato. "Somebody" is a slow pop song, featuring bass guitars with a piano and drum background. McKee wrote it inspired by Magnolia, where one of her idols Aimee Mann had the song "Save Me" featured, and described it as "kind of a ballad, just looking for that ’somebody,’ if you will. I believe in it and I hope everyone else does too.”

=== Release history ===
"Somebody" was released with Bonnie McKee's debut four-song EP Bonnie McKee on December 9, 2003. The song was released as a single when it was sent to adult album alternative radio on June 28, 2004. It was released physically on July 20, 2004, and contained the original version along with an acoustic version. The song was promoted heavily in internet radio service LAUNCHcast, where by November 2004 it was the tenth most played track on the website.

It was later released with McKee's first full length Trouble on September 7, 2004. A radio mix of the song was included in the compilation album The Artist Lounge Sampler (released April 12, 2005) while the original version was included in Warner Bros' compilation extended play Ahead of the June '04.

A music video for the song was released in 2004.

== Track listing ==
- Digital download / CD
1. "Somebody" – 4:12
2. "Somebody (Acoustic Version)" – 3:45

== Reception ==
The song earned good reviews, with Billboard describing "Somebody" as "a powerful anthem". "Somebody" entered the Adult Top 40 chart on September 18, 2004 at No. 39 and fell off the chart the following week.

=== Weekly charts ===
Chart (2004)	Peak position
US Adult Pop Airplay (Billboard)	39

== Release history ==
Release dates and formats for "Somebody"
Region	Date	Format	Label(s)	Ref.
United States	March 29, 2005	Mainstream airplay	Reprise	
