= Hot City (Bonnie McKee album) =

Studio album by Bonnie McKee
- Released: May 31, 2024
- Genre: Pop
- Length: 57:05
- Producer: Josh Abraham; Joakim Åhlund; Dave the Doctor; Sean Fischer; Bonnie McKee; Oligee; Vaughn Oliver; Matt Rad; Alexander Ridha; Michel Zitron

Bonnie McKee chronology
Bombastic (2015)	Hot City (2024)

Singles from Hot City
- 1. "Slay" Released: June 28, 2023; 2. "Hot City" Released: August 11, 2023; 3. "Don't Get Mad Get Famous" Released: November 3, 2023; 4. "Jenny's Got a Boyfriend" Released: April 24, 2024; 5. "Forever 21" Released: February 21, 2025

Hot City is the second studio album and first self-published album by American singer-songwriter Bonnie McKee. Released on May 31, 2024, the album was originally recorded in 2013 when McKee was signed to Epic Records but was never released. Leading up to its release, she has described the album as an "eighties-Miami expensive prostitute vibe."

McKee said she was inspired to re-record and release the album after coming across an online forum dedicated to the unreleased project. The forum, which reached a length of over 500 pages over ten years, struck McKee with the desire to "give the people what they want, because [McKee] want[ed] to put it out, too."

== Background ==
Before recording Hot City for Epic Records, McKee had made a name for herself as a prominent songwriter in the pop music scene. Having written five number-one hits for Katy Perry, Taio Cruz, and Britney Spears at the time, McKee was looking to make a name for herself as an artist. Bonnie McKee had already released the album Trouble under Reprise Records, but was dropped from the label following its mediocre performance and personal incidents.

The first single, "American Girl", was released in 2013 by Epic Records to moderate success. The song peaked at 87 on the Billboard Hot 100 chart while also peaking at 44 on the Canada Hot AC and 24 on the Pop Airplay charts. While already touring to promote her next single, "Slay", Epic Records cited both the moderate success of "American Girl" and insiders' dislike of "Slay" as reasons to cancel Hot City's release. By the time she was informed, McKee had already begun a promotional tour for upcoming singles.

Even though the release had been canceled, Epic Records still owned the masters to McKee's songs. Because of this, she could not release the original versions that had been recorded. In 2020, McKee was inspired to release the album after finding an online forum dedicated to her unreleased album. She decided to "pull a Taylor Swift" and release versions based on rerecorded masters. McKee had emailed Sony Music and received permission to rerecord her album along with the ability to license and include "American Girl". Previously independently released singles "Stars in Your Heart" and "Sleepwalker" were also included on the album.

After confirming there was no conflict with Sony, McKee began rerecording her songs. McKee also recorded a new song for the album, "Snatched", featuring Canada's Drag Race winner, Priyanka. The album was released on May 31, 2024.

== Reception ==
Professional ratings
Review scores
Source	Rating
Retropop	4/5 stars

Connor Gotto of Retropop described the album as a "treasure trove for pop fans", and praised the personality featured in the songs. Gotto also wrote that the album "captures the essence" of music on the charts of the early 2010s and acts as a "perfect" companion to Katy Perry's Teenage Dream. Walden Green of The Fader specifically praised the single "Slay", noting its lyrical and musical composition while directly praising the song's bridge.

== Track listing ==
All tracks are written by Bonnie McKee, with additional writers noted.

Track listing for Hot City
No.	Title	Writer(s)	Producer(s)	Length
1.	"Don't Get Mad Get Famous" (featuring Sophie Powers)	Cameron Hunter; Johnnie Newman; Liam Benayon; Sean Walsh; Mike Gonek; Sophie Luborsrky	McKee; Dave the Doctor	2:39
2.	"Hot City"	Jerome Harmon; Kelly Sheehan; Oliver Goldstein	Oligee	3:39
3.	"Jenny's Got a Boyfriend"	James Harris; Jimmy Jam; Terry Lewis; David Mørup	McKee; Dave the Doctor	3:13
4.	"Show You Mine"	Goldstein	McKee; Dave the Doctor; Oligee	3:01
5.	"I Wanna Call You"	Joakim Åhlund; Newman; Goldstein; Michel Zitron	McKee; Dave the Doctor; Åhlund; Oligee; Zitron	3:06
6.	"American Girl"	Alex Drury; Jacknife Lee; Jon Asher; Goldstein	Oligee; Josh Abraham; Matt Rad	3:43
7.	"Forever 21"	Sheehan; Vaughn Oliver; Goldstein	Oliver; Oligee	3:43
8.	"Slay"	Goldstein; Newman; Gary Go; Sam Hollander; Jamie Rise; Jesse Owen Astin	McKee; Oligee; Dave the Doctor	3:39
9.	"Electric Heaven"	Åhlund; Newman	McKee; Dave the Doctor; Åhlund; Oligee	3:25
10.	"Worst in Me"	Goldstein	McKee; Oligee; Dave the Doctor	3:42
11.	"Snatched" (featuring Priyanka)	Whitney Phillips; Sean Fischer; Mark Suknanan	McKee; Fischer; Dave the Doctor	3:21
12.	"Sleepwalker"	Newman; Alexander Ridha	Ridha; Oligee; Oliver	4:04
13.	"Just a Kiss"	Walsh; Morgan Kibby	McKee; Walsh	3:45
14.	"Rewind Your Heart"	Goldstein	McKee; Oligee; Dave the Doctor	3:32
15.	"Everything But You"	Newman; Åhlund	McKee; Åhlund; Oligee; Dave the Doctor	3:39
16.	"Stars in Your Heart"	Goldstein	McKee; Oligee	4:47
Total length:				57:05

== Personnel ==
- Bonnie McKee – vocals (all tracks), engineering (1–)
- Clint Gibbs – mastering, mixing (tracks 1–5, 7–11, 13–16)
- Sean Walsh – mastering (track 12), engineering (8, 12, 13, 16)
- Gene Grimaldi – mastering (track 6)
- Serban Ghenea – mixing (track 6)
- Vaughn Oliver – mixing (track 12)
- John Schmidt – engineering (tracks 1–11, 13–15)
- Andi Inadomi – engineering (track 15)
- Ryland Blackinton – guitar (track 15)
- Valerie Franco – drums (track 15)
- Brian Ziff – art direction
- Ernesto Belmont – graphic design, album artwork
