= Bonnie McKee =

American singer-songwriter and actress (born 1984)

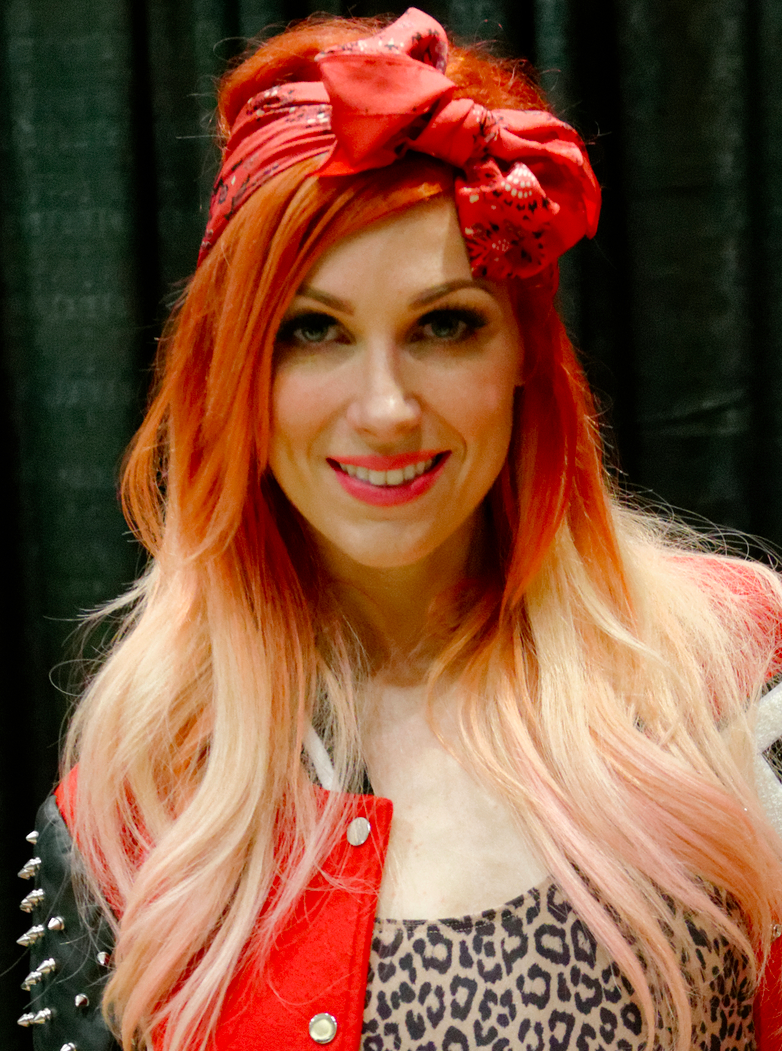
- McKee in 2013

Background information
- Born: Bonnie Leigh McKee; January 20, 1984 (age 42); Vacaville, California, U.S.
- Origin: Seattle, Washington, U.S.
- Genres: Pop; dance-pop; electropop; synth-pop; pop rock
- Occupations: Singer; songwriter; actress
- Works: Discography
- Years active: 2002–present
- Labels: Interscope; Reprise; Epic; Kemosabe
- Website: bonniemckee.com

Bonnie Leigh McKee (born January 20, 1984) is an American singer, songwriter, and actress. Her debut studio album, Trouble, was released in 2004 by Reprise Records. After the label dropped her, she took a musical hiatus and established herself as a professional songwriter. She has written 10 singles that have reached number one in either the United States or the United Kingdom, which have sold more than 30 million copies worldwide combined. In 2013, she made a return to music with the single "American Girl". In 2015, she independently released the EP Bombastic.

In 2024, after 11 years of anticipation by her fans expressed on social media and internet forums, she released a re-recorded version of what was meant to be her second LP, Hot City, originally supposed to be released through Epic Records in 2014, but ultimately cancelled by the label. Shortly after the cancellation of her album, a number of tracks meant for inclusion in its tracklist leaked on the internet. In the following years, they were cherished by her fans, prompting McKee to rerecord them in light of the Taylor Swift masters dispute. McKee released several tracks originally meant for her shelved 2014 album as singles from mid-2023 to early 2024, finally independently releasing the 16-track album on music streaming platforms.

McKee is particularly known for collaborating with singer Katy Perry. The duo wrote "California Gurls", "Teenage Dream", "Last Friday Night (T.G.I.F.)", "Part of Me", "Wide Awake", and "Roar". McKee also co-wrote "Dynamite" by Taio Cruz, which became the second-best-selling song by a British artist in the digital era. McKee co-wrote other songs including "Hold It Against Me" by Britney Spears and "C'Mon" by Kesha. She additionally has written for Cher, Christina Aguilera, Kelly Clarkson, and Adam Lambert. McKee has also collaborated with Canadian a cappella singer Mike Tompkins.

== Early life ==
McKee was born in Vacaville, California, and raised in Seattle. She studied classical piano and became a member of the Seattle Girls Choir Prime Voci at age 12; she toured with the choir throughout North America and Europe. She recorded two albums with the choir, titled Jackson Berkey Meets The Seattle Girls' Choir and Cantate 2000. She briefly attended The Bush School during her freshman year of high school, where she recorded a demo album with other student musicians as part of an experiential class project with The President's musician Dave Dederer, an alumnus and former English teacher at the school; unrelatedly, she was kicked out soon afterward. At age 12, McKee's mother gave a demonstration CD featuring her singing Bette Midler and Fiona Apple songs to a friend of hers who is the co-founder of the Sub Pop label, Jonathan Poneman. Poneman was intrigued by her songwriting talents. According to McKee, this was the moment when she realized she had to be "more than just a singer." She knew she had to be a songwriter as well.

== Career ==
=== 2004–2005: Career beginnings and Trouble ===
McKee wrote songs and performed in the Seattle area when she was 15. Her demo tape which was raw got to Colin Filkow, an ex-Priority Records label executive. Filkow recognized that she was a rare talent and signed her to his management company, Platinum Partners Artist Management in Beverly Hills. He flew her to Los Angeles and welcomed her into his family; she was only 17 at the time. He inspired her to sing and write songs and to trust her instincts. Filkow took Bonnie's demo to dozens of labels, publishers, agents, and entertainment lawyers. After more than a year, Filkow signed Bonnie to Warner Bros. Records in one of the most lucrative signings ever for a new artist.

Her debut album Trouble was recorded across a period of two years by producers Bob Power and Rob Cavallo, and commercially released on September 28, 2004. Reprise Records was unsure on how to sell McKee, so the label settled a partnership with internet radio website LAUNCHcast, which would promote the lead single "Somebody". "Somebody" soon became one of the most played tracks on the website, and its popularity with young female audiences led to a strategy positioning McKee as a subversive alternative to the teen pop demographic. "Somebody" was performed on Jimmy Kimmel Live!, included in the motion picture Win a Date with Tad Hamilton!, and had a music video featured on MTV's Buzzworthy and VH1's You Oughta Know. Trouble received positive reviews in Blender, Nylon, The Los Angeles Times, and Teen People, but was commercially unsuccessful. McKee spoke about the album being unsuccessful, saying, "It was devastating when the album didn't happen," she said. "I realized there are so many steps from getting a deal to having a hit... and I didn't get there. It was a huge letdown." McKee began work on a second studio album which never came to existence. According to McKee, she "downward-spiraled" and began to abuse crystal meth, an addiction with which she struggled for several years. She was dropped from the label after defacing the CEO's car with lipstick during the middle of the night.

=== 2006–2013: Songwriting and Epic records releases ===
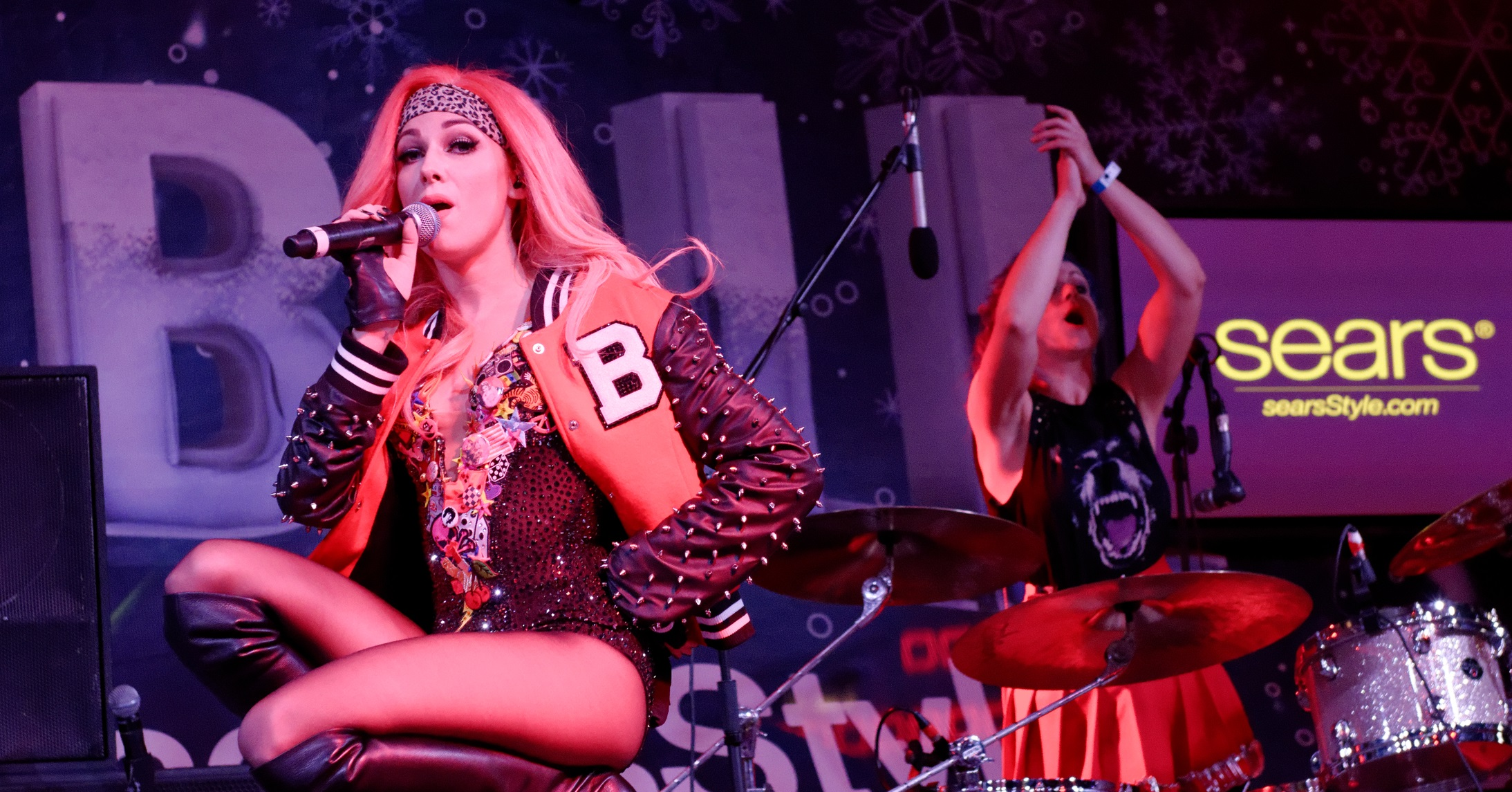
McKee performing on the KIIS Jingle Ball Village Stage at Staples Center in Los Angeles in 2013

Following her release from Reprise Records, McKee managed to get a job at Pulse Recordings' publishing arm, Check Your Pulse, through her boyfriend and longtime collaborator, Oliver "Oligee" Goldstein. She lived in poverty, without hot water, a cell phone, or a car while spending many hours in the recording studio, learning how to use Pro Tools and crafting new songs alongside Elliott Yamin and Leighton Meester. She also did some acting works related to music "to make sure I kept the allure of being an artist", playing Janis Joplin in American Dreams, a pianist in August Rush, and a busking guitarist in CSI: NY. Having already met music producer Dr. Luke through her longtime friend Katy Perry, who had done with Luke her second album One of the Boys. in 2009 McKee's manager Josh Abraham made a deal to sign McKee to Dr. Luke's production label Prescription Songs. About this time, Perry expressed interest in having "a co-writer I could volley with", adding that "Bonnie and I are on the same zeitgeist tip."

Perry and McKee (along with Max Martin and Benny Blanco) began writing songs, eventually producing the hits that would appear on Perry's third album, Teenage Dream. McKee co-wrote three singles from the album, "California Gurls", "Teenage Dream", and "Last Friday Night (T.G.I.F.)", the last of which was inspired by McKee and Perry's misadventures in their teenage years. Each of the singles topped the Billboard Hot 100 chart, and they earned McKee several BMI Pop Awards in 2011 and 2012 for her role as a songwriter. McKee also co-wrote two more chart-toppers for Perry, "Part of Me" and "Roar" as well as four other songs which hit number one on either the Hot 100 or the UK Singles Chart, Britney Spears' "Hold It Against Me", Taio Cruz's "Dynamite", Rita Ora's "How We Do (Party)", and Cheryl's "I Don't Care". On June 22, 2017, the Recording Industry Association of America (RIAA) announced that "Roar" had received an RIAA Diamond certification award for 10 million copies sold.

In 2012, McKee co-wrote two songs that appeared on Adam Lambert's album Trespassing, which debuted at number one on the Billboard 200 Album Chart. She appeared as a featured performer on "Thunder" from Rusko's album Songs, released on Mad Decent. During this time she signed a recording contract with Epic Records. She had garnered attention for her fashion sense, appearing on E!'s Fashion Police, and appearing on the pages of The New York Times, New York Post, and Schön! Magazine. In 2013, McKee was awarded three more BMI Pop awards for her songwriting work on Katy Perry's "Wide Awake" and "Part of Me", as well as Britney Spears's "Hold It Against Me".

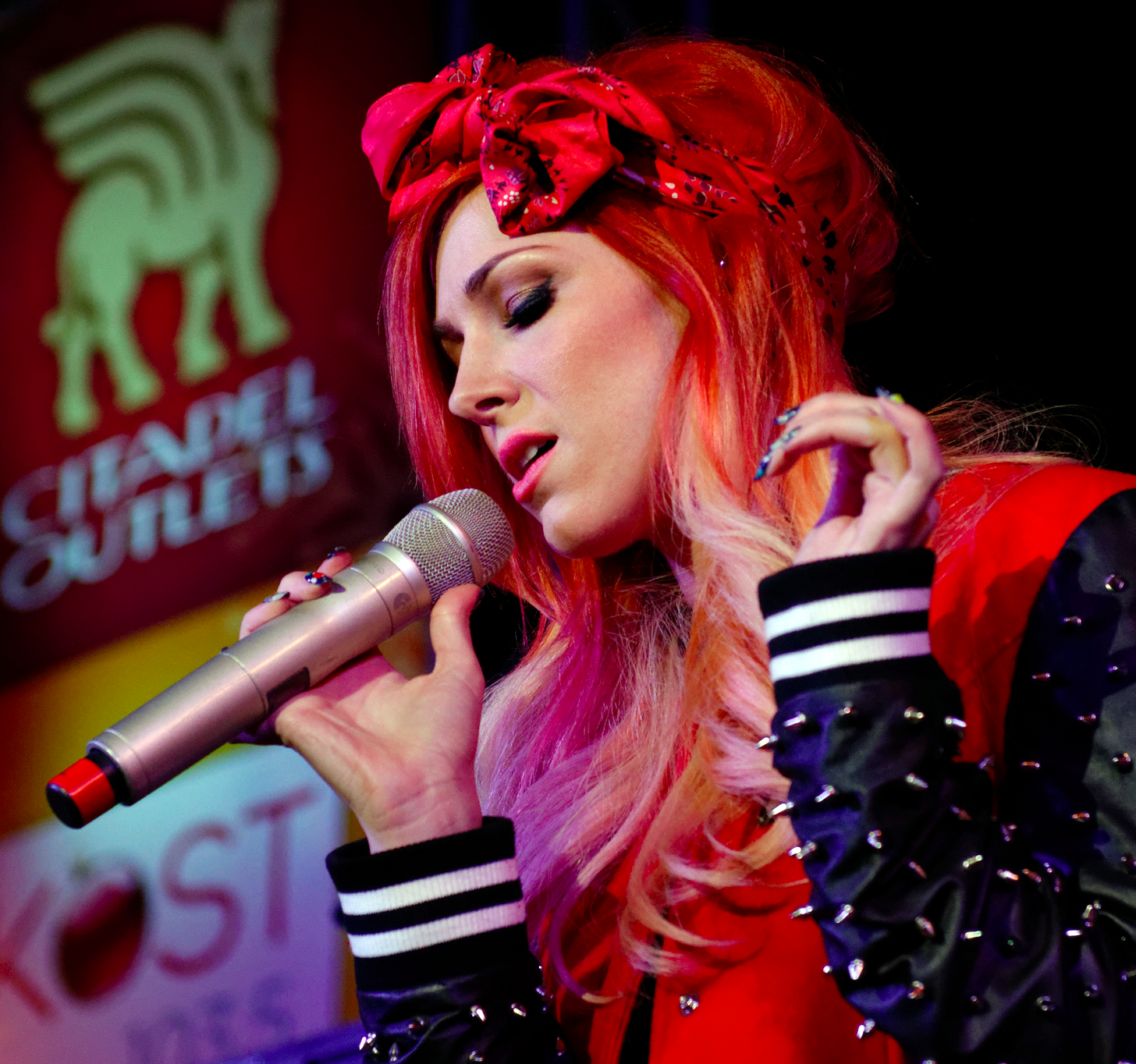
McKee performing in Commerce, California in November 2013

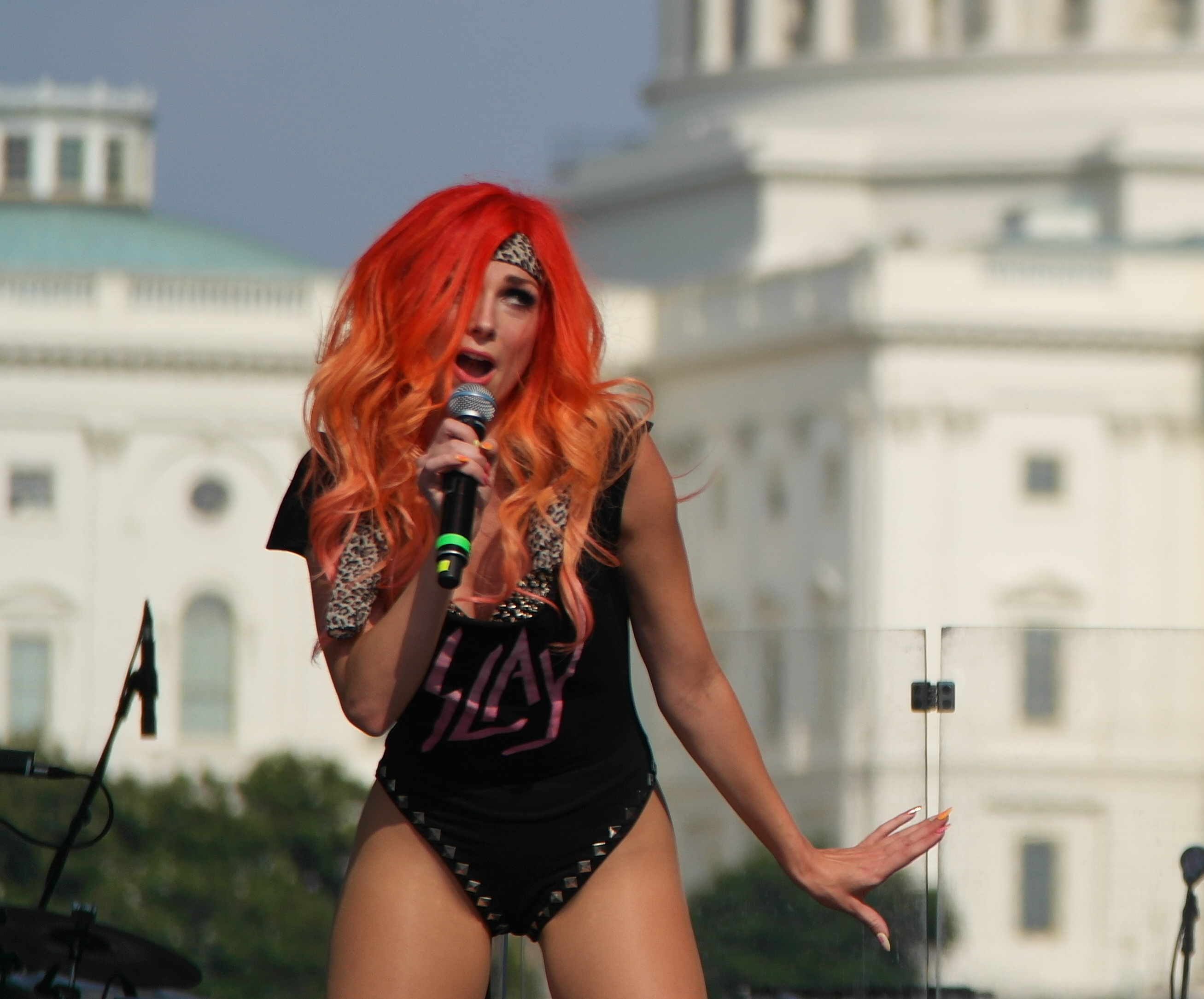
McKee performing as a headliner at the 2014 Capital Pride Festival

McKee's first single under Epic Records was "American Girl", which was released on July 23, 2013. She posted a promotional video for "American Girl" on YouTube in June 2013 which garnered 2.3 million views. The official music video for the song was released on July 22, 2013. In October, McKee released a new song titled "Sleepwalker". McKee confirmed that the song was not a single, but rather an "inbetweengle", a portmanteau meaning "in between single", meant to tide fans over until her next official release. The music video premiered on October 17, 2013, and starred McKee and Kelsey Chow. McKee had spent several years under a joint deal between Epic and Kemosabe Records and had planned to release her second studio album in the summer of 2014. A second single titled "S.L.A.Y." was performed at multiple venues and while she was on tour with Karmin on their Pulses Tour, but was delayed many times and eventually not released, until being re-recorded ten years later. McKee left Epic and Kemosabe Records after feeling she had a lack of control over her career and the creative direction that she wanted to take.

=== 2014–2020: Independent career, standalone singles and Bombastic ===
On December 18, 2014, McKee released a song called "California Winter" on to her SoundCloud and iTunes. On April 12, 2015, in an interview with Ultimate Music, she announced she had departed from Epic Records. McKee stated that this was because she felt controlled and like she had no creative freedom, so she preferred to be an independent artist. She said that she was releasing her second extended play in June that year and she intended for it to be a visual EP. She noted that one song, titled "Wasted Youth", had already had its music video filmed. At the Billboard Music Awards 2015, McKee revealed in an interview that Charlie Puth, with whom she had previously worked on her song "California Winter", had co-written her next single, which she also said would be released in the next week. This single was "Bombastic" as teased on her Instagram page. The video for "Bombastic" was released onto Bonnie's VEVO account on May 26, 2015. McKee also appeared in Eden xo's music video for her single "The Weekend" as Cinderella. The Bombastic EP was released on June 30, being her first album release since her 2004 debut Trouble.

On July 1, 2015, McKee announced on a live stream that she was trying to get back the rights to the songs she had previously recorded with her former label Epic Records, so she could finally get to release them; she also confirmed physical copies of the Bombastic EP were being released in the coming months. For Christmas, McKee released a special called "California Winter Extravaganza" on her YouTube account on December 16, which featured Ferras, Sarah Hudson, Lindsey Stirling, Todrick Hall, Karmin, Eden xo, Paper Pilots, and Bridget Marquardt.

On January 12, 2016, McKee released the music video for "Wasted Youth" on her VEVO channel. She uploaded a cover of Prince's song, "When Doves Cry" on her YouTube channel on April 28, 2016, as a tribute to Prince following his death on April 21, 2016. Of the cover, she said, "Prince has been and always will be one of my favorite artists and songwriters of all time. I'm not exaggerating when I say that I ask myself nearly every time I sit down to write a song, "What would Prince do?" "Doves Cry" is perfection and I know I could never even hope to touch his brilliance, but in his passing, I realized how much this song really means to me, and was inspired to pay homage to the late, great, genius who taught me to take musical risks, to act my age and not my shoe size, and how to get through this thing called life". On June 21, 2016, McKee released a remix for "I Want It All" featuring Vicetonr as the third single from the EP and published a music video for the original version on her VEVO account. In September 2016, in collaboration with Quest Nutrition brand, McKee released the video for the song "Stud Muffin" inspired by the movie Grease. On November 2, 2016, McKee released "Easy"'s music video on her VEVO account. On December 16, 2016, McKee released her single called "Stars in Your Heart", alongside the shelved music video from 2013, as a gift for her fans.

On August 18, 2017, McKee released the single "Thorns". She was featured on Norwegian DJ Kygo's track "Riding Shotgun" from his album Kids in Love, which was released on November 3, 2017.

On May 10, 2018, McKee released the single called "Mad Mad World", which premiered in Billboard Magazine. The song was released on streaming day later.

On February 15, 2019, McKee featured on Armin van Buuren single called "Lonely For You". She released a cover of Billie Eilish song called "Lovely", featuring AUGUST 08 on June 28, 2019. McKee released her collaboration with Eden xo called "Bad Girls Go To Heaven" on October 25, 2019.

In 2020, McKee directed and starred in her first short film, April Kills The Vibe.

=== 2022–present: Hot City and subsequent releases and reissues ===
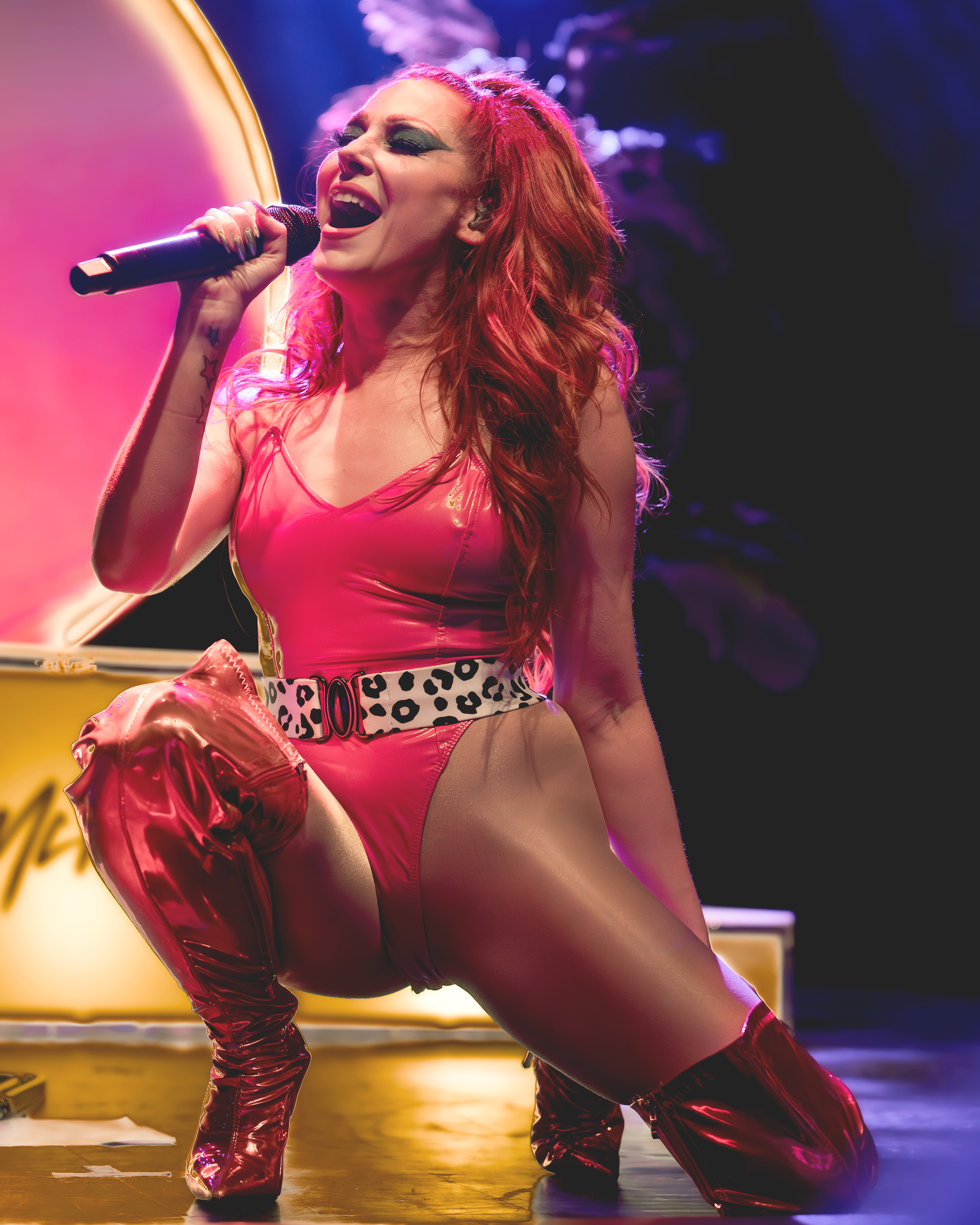
McKee performing at the El Rey Theater in 2025.

During 2022 and 2023, McKee re-recorded songs that were intended for her 2013 album with Epic Records. This came after joining TikTok, where she received many questions about the scrapped project from her followers, questions that had been recurrent on social networks and internet forums over the years. In some interviews, McKee talked about finding an internet forum which had a thread extending to about 500 pages discussing that era and songs, where it was found to have been titled Hot City. In June 2023, she released "SLAY," a song originally recorded ten years prior that had leaked online after being performed live on Karmin's Pulses Tour. The re-recorded Hot City album was officially announced on April 24, 2024, alongside another single release, "Jenny's Got a Boyfriend." In the time between "SLAY" and "Jenny's Got a Boyfriend," two other singles were released by McKee, "Hot City" and "Don't Get Mad Get Famous," attached to the 2013 era and present in the rerecorded album. The LP includes 15 songs from the Epic sessions, as well as a new song titled "Snatched," recorded in 2018, featuring drag queen artist Priyanka. The re-recorded project includes the original version of McKee's 2013 single "American Girl," which was supposed to be the lead single to the original album, as well as two other standalone singles that were later released, "Sleepwalker," and "Stars In Your Heart”. Hot City was released independently on May 31, 2024, as McKee’s second studio album. "Forever 21," another track sung in 2013 on Karmin's Pulses Tour and one that also leaked online, and had since been hyped by McKee's fans, was offered as a ready-to-download track during the preorder for Hot City, exclusively through Apple Music. It was also revealed that the album version of "Don't Get Mad Get Famous," released earlier as a solo single, would feature Canadian artist Sophie Powers. Since its release, Hot City has been met with positive reviews, being described as a "treasure trove for pop fans."

McKee stated that the main goal behind the re-recording and releasing Hot City, besides responding to requests from fans for an official release of the demos from her discarded era, which led her to "give the people what they want," was her own desire to see the scrapped tracks get such treatment. In her words, "I was so heartbroken when I had to shelve this album and I really didn't think there was any hope for it to see the light of the day, which is devastating because they were some of my favorite songs I had ever written for myself." She also stated that Epic Records had not made any objection to her independent release, but rather have were "very cooperative and cool" to her, adding that "now we're kinda partnering on [the album]." During the Hot City press interviews, she stated there was already a successor to her sophomore LP and she had "written probably 75% percent of it", adding that it is a "left turn from Hot City," "darker" and "really raw and emotional.”

During Hot City promotional campaign, McKee also released, on July 4, 2024, a re-edited EP for her 2013 single, American Girl, including a remix by duo of DJs Oliver, previously released through SoundCloud and also uploaded to McKee's official YouTube account. Four days after the release of American Girl EP, the singer released a music video for the longtime fan-favourite track "Forever 21," premiering it through Nylon, and then uploading it to her official YouTube account. To promote Hot City, McKee served as a supporting act for the Canadian artist Kiesza's Dancing and Crying Tour on the Pacific Coast of the United States and Canada in October 2024. One day before McKee joined this trek, she performed at No Creeps! Another F*cking Music Industry Event at the Bourbon Room in Hollywood, Los Angeles, in order to advocating for safety, mental health and inclusivity in the music industry. On October 9, 2024, McKee made available for pre-order both CD and vinyl formats off Hot City, the former through her official webstore, and the latter through Graffiti Records website. After the vinyl sold out, a second batch was made available through McKee's official webstore.

On Halloween's Eve of 2024, McKee released an EP to her 2013 single, "Sleepwalker," including a remix featuring American indie artist Mothica. The EP, named Sleepwalker (Resurrected), features five previously released McKee's collaborations under collective musician band project LVCRFT. Following that, on December 18, 2024, a Christmas EP titled after her 2014 single, "California Winter," featuring the track in its original form and also as a re-recorded duet with American singer, actor, and comedian Matt Rogers, plus other four Christmas tracks, including a cover of Canadian singer and songwriter Leonard Cohen's 1984 single and posterior signature hit, "Hallelujah," was released on streaming music services. Among the other tracks from California Winter EP, there are two cover versions of the 1944 Christmas classic ballad first introduced by Judy Garland, "Have Yourself a Merry Little Christmas," one close to Garland's original version, and another with expletive lyrics, that also appear on that version title.

On February 21, 2025, in the same vein of her previously released American Girl EP (see above), McKee released a correspondent extended play for longtime fan-favourite leaked demo turned rerecorded album track on Hot City, "Forever 21." Following the same pattern of the EP off her only one single released through Epic Records, Forever 21 EP features several different versions of this single, such as instrumental, a cappella, unplugged, sped up and slow down ones. On June 20, 2025, McKee released a remix for the closing track, the ballad "Easy," made by South African music artist Dreamkid. An extended edit of Bombastic, subtitled "Play Hard Edition, was released July 4, 2025. On September 17, 2025, the single "Runaways" by The Midnight was released, with McKee featured as a vocalist.

In October 2025, McKee featured on Retrograde The Musical's release of "Libra (Fairest of Them All)", collaborating alongside Jesse Saint John and Drew Louis.

== Personal life ==
McKee is bisexual, saying on an episode of In Bed with Joan, "I think it's one of those things where, you know, I think all little girls kind of play 'doctor' with their girlfriends, and then I kind of never grew out of it."

== Influences ==
McKee has cited Mariah Carey, Madonna, Tina Turner, Blondie, Michael Jackson, Whitney Houston, and Prince as major influences.

== Discography ==
Studio albums

- Trouble (2004)
- Hot City (2024)

== Tours ==
Opening act

- Ryan Cabrera (2005)
- Jonas Brothers Live (The Jonas Brothers) (2013)
- Pulses Tour (Karmin) (2014)
- Kids in Love Tour (Kygo) (2017–18)
- Dancing and Crying Tour (Kiesza) (2024)
- Time Machines Tour (The Midnight) (2026)

== Filmography ==
=== Film ===
Year	Title	Role	Notes
2004	Win a Date with Tad Hamilton!	Herself	Cameo appearance
2007	August Rush	Lizzy	
2012	Katy Perry: Part of Me	Herself	Cameo appearance
2015	California Winter Extravaganza	Herself/host	Short film
2020	April Kills the Vibe	April/Lola	Short film

=== Television ===
Year	Title	Role	Notes
2004	American Dreams	Janis Joplin	Episode: "Shoot the Moon"
2009	CSI: NY	Eleanor Ravelle	Episode: "Help"
2012	Fashion Police	Herself	
2020	Royalties	Kimmy Kelly	Episode: "Kick Your Shoes Off"

=== Web series ===
Year	Title	Role	Notes
2013	Breaking Bonnie	Herself	Main role; 6 episodes
2014	In Bed with Joan	Herself	Episode: "Bonnie McKee"

== See also ==
- List of songs written by Bonnie McKee
