= Bombastic (EP) =

EP by Bonnie McKee
- Released: June 30, 2015
- Recorded: 2015
- Studio: Pulse Recording (Los Angeles, California)
- Genre: Pop, pop rock
- Length: 15:23
- Label: Bonnie McKee Music
- Producer: Bonnie McKee (exec.); Oliver Goldstein

Bonnie McKee chronology
Trouble (2004)	Bombastic (2015)	Hot City (2024)

Singles from Bombastic
- 1. "Bombastic" Released: May 26, 2015; 2. "I Want It All" Released: June 17, 2016

Bombastic is the second extended play (EP) by American singer-songwriter Bonnie McKee released on June 30, 2015 as digital download by McKee's independent record label. She also stated her intentions for it to be a visual EP.

== Background ==
McKee released her debut studio album Trouble in 2004, which was a commercial failure. After a while, she began writing songs with famous artists such as Katy Perry, Britney Spears and Taio Cruz. Many songs that McKee wrote reached the top of international charts. In 2013, McKee signed a contract with Epic Records and released "American Girl", which had a low commercial performance but was well received by the public. McKee and her label so far were in a conflict due to McKee's need for creative freedom. Eventually, McKee left Epic Records.

During an interview with Idolator McKee revealed that she wrote over 100 songs, and that she plans to continue releasing recordings independently.

It’s like, “I’m tired of waiting. I want to get a batch of songs to my fans.” I have 100 songs and I want all of them to come out. Of course, I have to pick my babies and kill my darlings and stuff. I really am looking forward to doing a full length, but I’m just putting this EP to see what happens, see what opportunities come my way. I have a whole album’s worth of material that I wrote when I was on Epic ready to go.

On July 1, McKee announced on a live stream she was attempting to get back the rights to the songs she had previously recorded with her late label Epic Records so she could finally get to release them. She also confirmed physical copies of the Bombastic EP were being released in the coming months. After some years of effort, McKee eventually released Hot City, a 16-track LP, on May 31, 2024, through an independently release, featuring 15 tracks that were originally meant to be on the cancelled Epic Records album, most of them rerecorded, having for inspiration the Taylor Swift masters dispute and the ultimate desire by both Bonnie and her fans to have them officially released. Hot City has served since as her sophomore album, twenty years after Trouble.

In June 2025, McKee announced a deluxe edition, subtitled Play Hard Edition. It was released on July 4. In conjunction, a remix of "Easy" was released.

== Singles ==
The first single from the EP was "Bombastic", released on May 26, 2015. It was written by McKee, Charlie Puth, Sean Walsh and Axident, and is an 80s-influenced dance-pop and pop rock song. Mike Wass from Idolator says that the song "plays like an ’80s workout tape," while the music video is "jam-packed with amazing outfits from the decade taste forgot and several eye-popping poses." The official music video for the song was directed by David Richardson. According to an interview given to Artist Direct Bonnie revealed this was a song about reconnecting with her true self and feeling in charge of her own creativity.

This is what my art looks like when you remove the filter of a corporate overlord record label... It's about freedom to be yourself without caring what other people think, it's about the thrill of the fight, being fearless and empowered, and not apologizing for it! I wrote it when I was feeling kind of frustrated and down, and I needed to remind myself that I am a boss and I have the power to be who I want to be and do what I want to do. And I hope that that is what everyone else takes away from it too! Be bombastic!

A music video for the song "Wasted Youth" was directed by Darren Craig and released on January 12, 2016. The 80s-themed music video for the second single "I Want It All" was released on June 21, 2016 on McKee's Vevo account, the single remix features Vicetone and was released June 17, 2016. The psychedelic, pastel-colored music video for "Easy" was released on November 2, 2016.

== Track listing ==
All songs produced by Sean Walsh, except where noted.

Bombastic track listing
No.	Title	Writer(s)	Length
1.	"I Want It All"	Bonnie McKee; Oliver Goldstein; Greg Kurstin; Sean Walsh	4:02
2.	"Bombastic"	McKee; Charlie Puth; Walsh; Andreas Schuller	3:22
3.	"Wasted Youth"	McKee; John Newman; Walsh	4:09
4.	"Easy" (Walsh, Goldstein)	McKee; Schuller; James Wong	3:51
Total length:			15:23

Bombastic: Play Hard Edition track listing
No.	Title	Writer(s)	Length
5.	"I Want It All" (with Vicetone) (Vicetone remix)	McKee; Goldstein; Kurstin; Walsh	3:44
6.	"Bombastic" (with Dehiro) Dehiro Ragemix)	McKe; Puth; Walsh; Schuller	2:45
7.	"Wasted Youth" (with Supergood) (Supergood remix)	McKee; Newman; Walsh	3:14
8.	"Bombastic" (with Bodér) (Bodér X Bonnie McKee remix)	McKe; Puth; Walsh; Schuller	2:57
9.	"Easy" (with Dreamkid) (Dreamkid remix)	McKee; Schuller; Wong	3:42
10.	"Bombastic" ((with Surrender) (Surrender! No More Mister Nice Guy remix)	McKe; Puth; Walsh; Schuller	2:56
11.	"Bombastic" (clean)	McKe; Puth; Walsh; Schuller	3:22
12.	"Bombastic" (instrumental)	McKe; Puth; Walsh; Schuller	3:22
Total length:			41:25

== Personnel ==
- Bonnie McKee – executive producer, lead vocals, songwriter
- Oliver Goldstein – writer, producer
- Greg Kurstin – writer
- Sean Walsh – writer, producer
- Charlie Puth – writer
- Andreas Schuller – writer
- John Newman – writer
- James Wong – writer

== Chart positions ==
Chart (2015)	Peak position
US Heatseekers Albums (Billboard)	13
US Independent Albums (Billboard)	46

== Release history ==
Region	Date	Format(s)	Label	Ref
Worldwide	30 June 2015	Digital download	Bonnie McKee Music	
United States	August, 2015	CD (Autographed)	Bonnie McKee Music	
