= American Girl (Bonnie McKee song) =

Single by Bonnie McKee
- Released: June 25, 2013
- Genre: Dance-pop; electropop; bubblegum pop
- Length: 3:44
- Label: Epic
- Songwriters: Josh Abraham; Jon Asher; Alex Drury; Oliver Goldstein; Garrett Lee; Bonnie McKee
- Producers: Josh Abraham; Oligee

Bonnie McKee singles chronology
"Somebody" (2004)	"American Girl" (2013)	"Bombastic" (2015)

Music video
- "American Girl" on YouTube

"American Girl" is a song by American singer and songwriter Bonnie McKee intended to be the lead single of her then-shelved second studio album. Epic Records first released it to McKee's SoundCloud on June 25, 2013. The song was written by McKee, Josh Abraham, Jon Asher, Alex Drury, Oliver Goldstein and Jacknife Lee, while Abraham and Oligee handled the production. The single has been described as a dance-pop and electropop track. Its lyrics address McKee's childhood and teenagehood from an American perspective. The song is included on McKee's second studio album, Hot City, which was released in 2024.

"American Girl" was met with positive reviews from music critics, who complimented its sound and lyrics. The song was McKee's first entry (and the only entry to date) on the Billboard Hot 100, peaking at number 87. It also entered the charts of Australia, Germany, New Zealand and South Korea. Two music videos were directed for the track. The first one shows McKee alongside other celebrities including Katy Perry, Kesha, and George Takei lip synching to the song. The second one, directed by Justin Francis, depicts McKee spending her time with a couple of friends. Both videos were received positively by critics. McKee performed the song on various occasions including at KIIS FM and on Good Morning America in 2013.

== Background and release ==
Following the underperformance of her debut album Trouble (2004) and an incident regarding the defacement of a Warner Records' former chairman car with lipstick, McKee was dropped from the label. However, due to the connection she had through her boyfriend, McKee was able to submit a song to the music publishing company Pulse Recording, which would subsequently sign her. She began working with American singers Elliott Yamin and Leighton Meester until fellow singer Katy Perry, whom McKee had already met, invited her to work for Perry's Teenage Dream (2010). In a November 2010 interview with Billboard, McKee stated that she would begin working on her second album in 2011 with American record producer and songwriter Dr. Luke and she hoped to have "something" released by spring.

Epic Records noticed McKee's "staggering run of hits" and according to Josh Abraham, the label was "salivating to [sign McKee]". Her performance of "Lovebird" (2012), a song she co-wrote and gave to British singer Leona Lewis, impressed former Epic Records CEO and chairman L.A. Reid who signed her to the label soon after. Talking to Billboard in February 2013, McKee admitted that her solo releases were delayed because she "took offers" which she couldn't "turn down", and that the aforementioned label would release her second album in the summer.

McKee revealed that the song was initially meant for Canadian singer Justin Bieber, but no one showed interest in it. She later repurposed the song for herself and rewrote most of the verses except the first line. McKee wrote "American Girl" with Abraham, Jon Asher, Alex Drury, Oliver Goldstein and Jacknife Lee, while Abraham and Oligee produced it. The track was issued to McKee's SoundCloud for streaming by Epic Records on June 25, 2013. The label also sent the song to American contemporary hit radio stations on July 16 and released it for digital download in various countries one week later. "American Girl" was meant to be the lead single off her untitled second album. However, the album was shelved as she chose to leave Epic Records, claiming that she felt "really unhappy" with the label. In 2024, McKee independently released a reworked version of the album under the title Hot City, which includes "American Girl".

Almost ten years after its original release, the single got a remixed extended play, released by McKee independently through streaming music services, following the release of Hot City album. Among the remixes, there is one by duo of DJs Oliver, that was previously released through SoundCloud and also uploaded to McKee's official YouTube account.

== Composition and lyrics ==
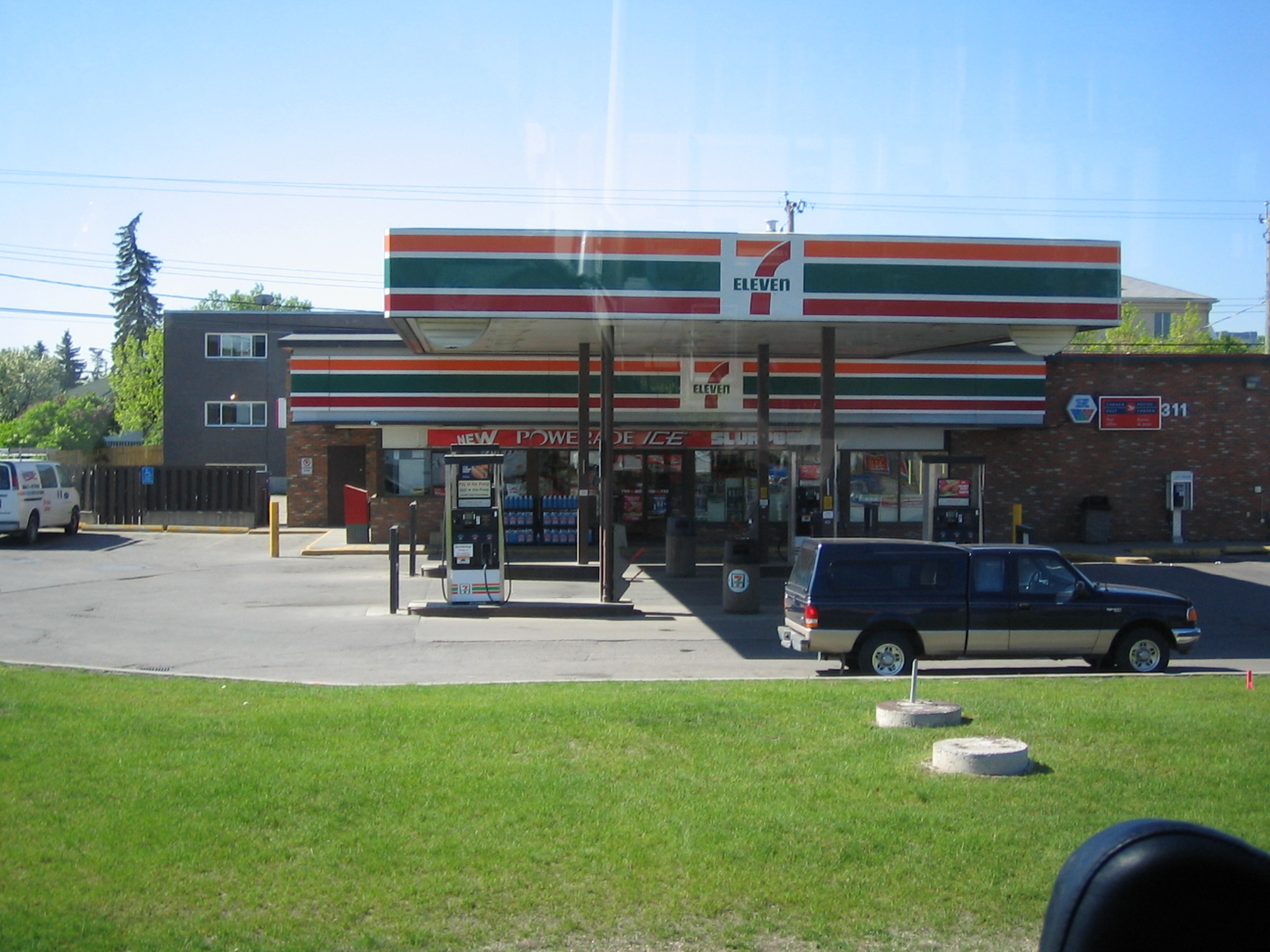
McKee used to spend time at a 7-Eleven store (pictured) when she was younger, which she references in the song.

"American Girl" is a dance-pop and electropop song. Mikael Wood of Los Angeles Times noted that the track contains "candied synth licks" and "sweet slap bass". Writing for HuffPost, Kia Makarechi pointed out that "American Girl" has "a breathy, dance-inflected beat". In an interview with USA Today, McKee affirmed that she wanted to write a song "about [her] experience as a teen in America". She added in another interview with Billboard that it "captures [her] entire American childhood in three-and-a-half minutes". McKee elaborated how she spent time in a 7-Eleven parking lot with a boy trying to get people to buy them beer and cigarettes, and that she "was raised by television" because she learned "so many life lessons from sitcoms and music videos". She further discusses in the song that she is warm-blooded, plans to "take over the world" and that "every day is a competition". McKee stated that the original version of the track contained a lyric about "falling in love in IKEA" and that the second verse was "racier". Billboard's Matt Diehl considered the lyrics "I fell in love in a 7–11 parking lot / Drinking Slurpees we mixed with alcohol" to be "nostalgic".

== Reception ==
"American Girl" was met with positive reviews from music critics. Wood stated that it shares "its bouncy electro-pop groove with any number of hits by Katy Perry". Diehl regarded the song as having "[a] relentless club groove, soaring melodic lines" and "a pop-art confection of a chorus". Sam Lansky, writing for Idolator, called it "a plucky pop confection" with "clever lyrical conceit" and declared that it is "perfectly tailored to dominate radio all summer long". Teen Vogue's Casey Lewis expressed a similar opinion, claiming that the track is a "top contender" to be "song of the summer" and considered that it "couldn't be catchier". Lauren Craddock of American Songwriter deemed it a "dance-pop party anthem", which USA Today's Korina Lopez resounded. Writing for MTV, Jenna Hally Rubenstein stated that "American Girl" is a "perfect pop song" featuring "sparkling pop production" and "a booming and surging chorus".

Commercially, "American Girl" was McKee's first song to chart on the Billboard Hot 100, peaking at number 87 and selling 25,000 copies in its first two weeks. The track reached its highest peak on the Mainstream Top 40, where it reached number 24. On the Adult Top 40, it became her second entry following "Somebody" (2004). Elsewhere, it peaked at number 31 in New Zealand, 41 on South Korea's Gaon International Chart and 51 in Australia.

== Promotion ==
=== Music videos and live performances ===
The first music video was released on YouTube on June 26, 2013. Aside from McKee, it features several celebrities who appear via videotelephony lip synching to the song including Perry, Kesha, Becky G, Jason Derulo, Joan Rivers and George Takei. The second music video for "American Girl" was directed by Justin Francis and premiered on McKee's Vevo channel on July 22, 2013. In the video, McKee is first seen spending her time with a couple of friends sitting on the curb drinking Slurpees while making eye contact with a "hunky bro". Afterwards, McKee and her friends buy food from a 7-Eleven store and then "settle in for a pool day". The video ends with them stealing a car from "a muscular, tatted-up man". According to Lansky, the second video "relies heavy on quintessentially American imagery".

McKee sang "American Girl" at American radio station KIIS FM on July 2, 2013. She gave an acoustic performance of the track at Idolator on July 31. In August of the same year, she performed the song during a studio session with Billboard and on American morning television program Good Morning America. On February 18, 2014, McKee sang the track at Yahoo! Music's studio.

=== Reception ===
Both music videos received mainly positive reviews from critics. Lewis called it "super cool" and "rad", while Rubenstein considered it to be "a pop star #emo moment". Writing for MTV, Jocelyn Vena praised the celebrities which appeared in it and several of their moments, and stated that the video is "what makes the song so buzz-worthy". Wood also praised the appearance of the various celebrities. Conversely, Lansky opined that the video distracts from the song. Vanity Fair's Julie Miller thought it to be "the universe's most random music video". Rubenstein deemed the second video to be "as worthy" as the first one, and Lansky compared it to "Tik Tok"'s (2009) visual, noting its "similar free-spirited vibe".

== Personnel ==
Credits are adapted from Tidal.

- Bonnie McKee – lead vocals, songwriter
- Josh Abraham – producer, songwriter, guitar
- Oliver "Oligee" Goldstein – producer, songwriter, guitar, keyboards
- Alex Drury – songwriter
- Jacknife Lee – songwriter, guitar
- Jon Asher – songwriter
- John Hanes – engineer
- Sean Walsh – engineer
- Matt Rad – keyboards, miscellaneous production
- Gene Grimaldi – mastering engineer
- Serban Ghenea – mixing engineer

== Charts ==
Chart performance for "American Girl"
Chart (2013)	Peak position
Australia (ARIA)	51
Canada CHR/Top 40 (Billboard)	44
Canada Hot AC (Billboard)	44
Germany (GfK)	82
New Zealand (Recorded Music NZ)	39
South Korea (Gaon International Chart)	41
US Billboard Hot 100	87
US Adult Pop Airplay (Billboard)	37
US Pop Airplay (Billboard)	24

== Release history ==
Release dates and formats for "American Girl"
Region	Date	Format	Version	Label	Ref.
Various	June 25, 2013	Streaming	Original	Epic	
Various	July 23, 2013	Digital download; streaming	Original	Epic	
United States	July 16, 2013	Contemporary hit radio	Original	Epic	
Various	July 4, 2024	Digital download; streaming	Extended play	Independent	
