= Eden xo =

American singer, songwriter, and dancer (born 1989)

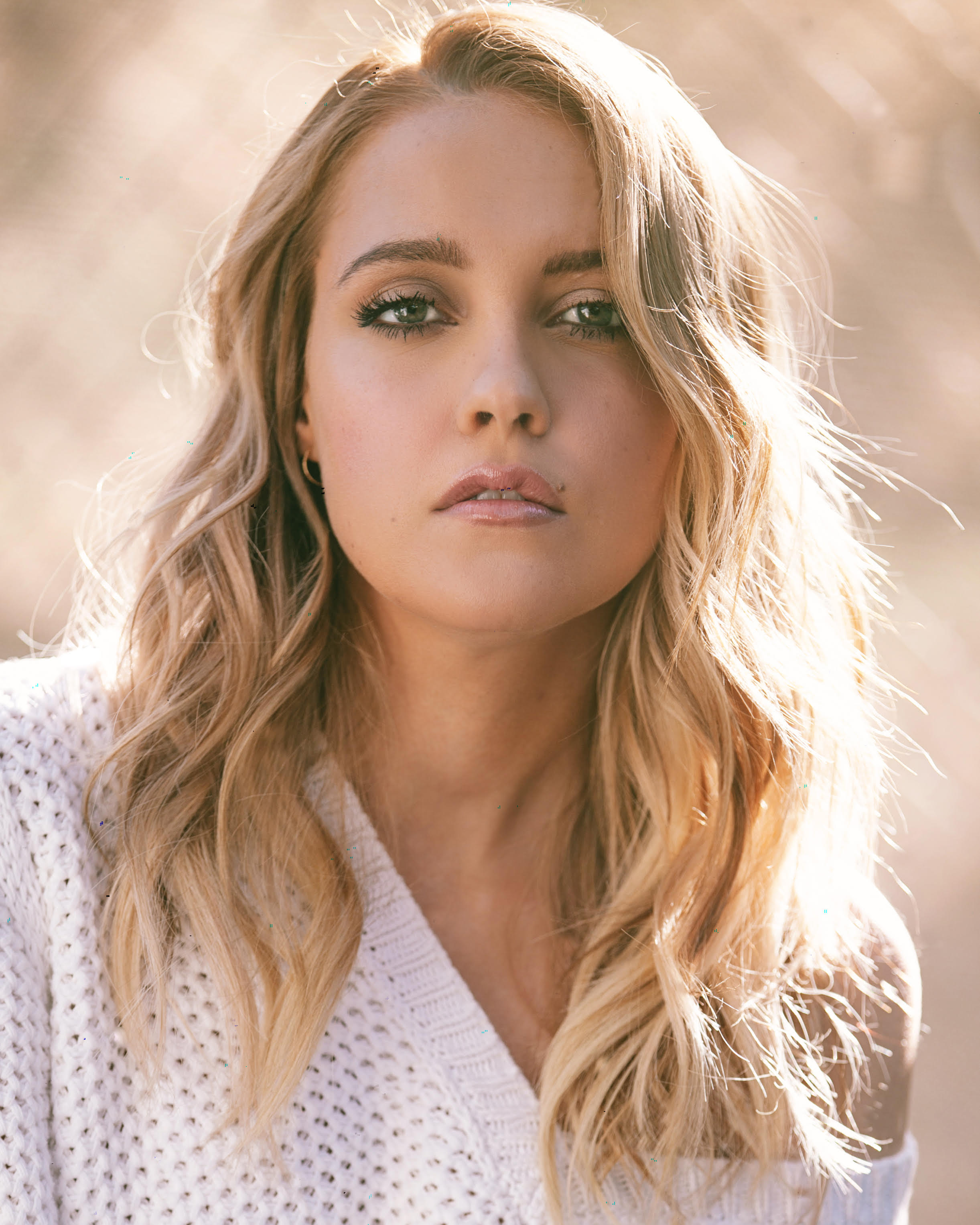
- Eden xo in 2020

Background information
- Birth name: Jessica Eden Malakouti
- Also known as: Jessie Malakouti; Jessie and the Toy Boys; Eden Wilson
- Born: March 30, 1989 (age 36); Anaheim, California, U.S.
- Genres: Pop; electropop; dance-pop; alternative
- Occupations: Singer; songwriter; actress; dancer
- Instruments: Vocals
- Years active: 2006–present
- Labels: Prospect Park; Epic; Ministry of Sound; Virgin
- Formerly of: Shut Up Stella
- Website: www.everythingeden.com

Eden Wilson (née Malakouti), best known as Eden xo, is an American singer, songwriter, actress and dancer. Described by the BBC as a "colourful, ambitious, out-and-out pop princess," she has been compared to Gwen Stefani and early Madonna.

== Early life ==
Wilson was born in Anaheim and raised in Moreno Valley, California. Her father immigrated from Iran to the United States during the Iranian Revolution. Her California-born mother ran away to Guadalajara and got married when she was 19, having two children with her first husband before returning to the US.

As a child, Wilson wrote poems and put them to music. At age 12, she danced with a hip-hop crew and wrote raps that she performed in English and Persian. She graduated from high school two years early—she said in a 2011 interview that she had a "volcanic childhood"—and emancipated herself from her parents at 16.

== Career ==
=== Shut Up Stella, EMI Publishing, London ===
Wilson moved to Los Angeles following her graduation. In 2006 she started an all-female punk band, Shut Up Stella, who were signed by Epic shortly after their formation. They recorded "Watch Me Rain", which was produced by Greg Kurstin and featured in movies including the Tina Fey and Amy Poehler film Baby Mama. The band was dropped in 2008 and Wilson quit, deciding to focus instead on her career as an actress, songwriter and solo artist. Among others, she later worked with Ali Shaheed Muhammad of A Tribe Called Quest. Her songs "Trash Me" and "Outsider", which she released independently, were used in the MTV series, The Hills.

At the end of 2008, Wilson signed with EMI Music Publishing. She spent the following two years in London, where she worked extensively with the French house music producer Fred Falke and Xenomania. She also worked with the Pet Shop Boys (with the London Symphony Orchestra), Kylie Minogue, and Johnny Marr. Her song "Standing Up for the Lonely" was released in 2009 on the dance label Ministry of Sound and appeared on the label's compilation albums The Annual 2010, Dance Nation 2 and Funky House Classics. She toured the UK with The Saturdays in 2009.

=== Jessie and the Toy Boys, Femme Fatale tour, Identity Festival, attention from fashion media ===
In 2010 Wilson created Jessie and the Toy Boys. It was a solo project; the Toy Boys were mannequins. She said in a 2011 interview that she wanted plastic bandmates that could not get in the way of her creative vision. Show Me Your Tan Lines, a five-song EP, was independently released in June 2011. Produced by Jimmy Harry and Tony Kanal, it included the single "Push It" (ft. Yelawolf)", which hit the Top 10 on the Billboard dance charts. Wilson performed the song on Conan, making her television debut. During the summer of 2011, Jessie and the Toy Boys opened for Britney Spears and Nicki Minaj on the North American leg of the Femme Fatale tour and in the fall played alongside artists including Steve Aoki, Pete Tong, Kaskade and Avicii as a main stage artist on the Identity Festival tour.

In 2012, Wilson began to generate coverage in fashion magazines such as Elle and Women’s Wear Daily. She did multiple shoots with Purple, including a Lolita- inspired editorial spread.

An advocate for LGBTQ rights, Jessie and the Toy Boys performed at events associated with the LGBTQ community such as the Palm Springs White Party and the Dinah Shore Weekend. She co-headlined Los Angeles Pride with Fifth Harmony, Kesha and Tinashe, and headlined Pride events in Chicago and Atlanta. Wilson's song "Runaway", written with DJ Skeet Skeet, was a statement against Prop 8.

=== Eden xo, "Too Cool to Dance", collaborations ===
Wilson signed to Virgin in 2013. In 2014—with the addition of an "xo"—she began using her midldle name, Eden, and released the single "Too Cool to Dance" as Eden xo. It hit the Top 40 on Billboard and the Top 20 on the club charts. In 2014, it was featured on So You Think You Can Dance to mark National Dance Day. So You Think You Can Dance producer and judge Nigel Lythgoe choreographed a dance routine for the song and Wilson helped him teach it to young dancers. The follow-up to "Too Cool to Dance" was "The Weekend". It was another hit, as was a remix of the track that featured Lil Jon. Wilson also recorded a version of the Thompson Twins song "Hold Me Now" in 2015; it was featured in the pilot episode of the series Scream Queens.

In 2016 the video for Wilson's song "El Barrio" was released; it featured Rafael Reyes, also known as Leafar Seyer, as her love interest.

Although Wilson was then writing songs for other artists, including Kygo and Ava Max, she remained focused on her own career after parting ways with Virgin in 2017. She released a series of singles that included "Cinematic Goodbye" as well as collaborations with Raja Kumari ("Drips Gold") and Travis Mills ("Say That Again"). Justin Moran of Paper wrote: "With its high drama and heart-wrenching emotion, "Cinematic Goodbye" represents a shift in the glossy dance music Eden's known for releasing. Last year, she dropped her sunny Travis Mills-assisted standout "Say That Again," and the impossibly catchy sex positive anthem "Drips Gold," featuring Raja Kumari. Her 2014 breakout single "Too Cool To Dance" solidified Eden as an alt-pop star to keep on your radar."

=== The Question, "Bad Apple", VON ===
Wilson independently released the EP The Question in 2019. Its five songs included "So Lucky," which was accompanied by a video starring Angelyne. Peter Robinson of Popjustice described the collection as 'an EP that fizzes with future-facing pop flair and classic songwriting...brilliantly expressive'. She later independently released the songs “Bad Girls Go to Heaven," written with her frequent songwriting partner Bonnie McKee, "Paradise Found" (written with McKee and David Sneddon), and "American Youth French Kissing".

In June 2023, Wilson released the single and video "All Day Every Day." She said she originally wrote and recorded the track in a castle in France in 2013. "Bad Apple" was released in September. It appeared on the Rolling Stone playlist, "Songs You Need to Know".

Ellen von Unwerth photographed Wilson for a cover story in VON after meeting her at a Madonna concert in April 2024. In an Instagram post, Von Unwerth said she was "fascinated" by Wilson's resemblance in attitude and appearance to Madonna. Von Unwerth, who shot Madonna frequently, titled Wilson's session "Bitch, I'm Not Madonna."

== Personal life ==
Wilson and her husband, Ryan Wilson—a visual artist known as ThankYouX—live in Los Angeles. They have one child.

A supporter of animal rights, Wilson appeared in the Humane Society's campaign to end animal testing for cosmetics. She also supports A Place Called Home, a high school program for students on probation, in the foster system, and/or without stable homes.
