= Trouble (Bonnie McKee album) =

Studio album by Bonnie McKee
- Released: September 28, 2004
- Recorded: 2002–2003
- Genre: Pop rock
- Length: 50:37
- Label: Reprise
- Producers: Rob Cavallo; Antonina Armato; Bob Power

Bonnie McKee chronology
Bonnie McKee (2003)	Trouble (2004)	Bombastic (2015)

Singles from Trouble
- 1. "Trouble" Released: December 9, 2003; 2. "Somebody" Released: June 28, 2004

Trouble is the debut studio album by American singer-songwriter Bonnie McKee, released in September 2004. The songs were written when she was 14–15, and reflect events in her life at the time. McKee had produced six of these in demo form in 2001, and they were broadcast on Seattle radio stations and the National Public Radio network.

McKee had essentially completed the album in New York City with Bob Power as producer when Reprise asked her to record "Somebody" with Rob Cavallo in California. Pleased with the more layered sound, she decided to re-record all but "January" and "I Hold Her". This delayed the album's release by a year.

== Production and release ==
McKee first recorded her album in New York City with producer Bob Power over eight months. Then she was introduced to producer Rob Cavallo, who served as Reprise's artist and repertoire man, and went to Los Angeles with him, first to record Trouble's lead single "Somebody". The result was enough for them to re-record the whole album, taking a year.

Reprise was unsure how to promote McKee, with the singer herself admitting that "I was a teenage rebel rock star, but writing these heartfelt singer/songwriter songs. I was given a dress code because everyone thought I was 'too sexy.' No one knew what to do with me." The label at first considered showcasing her in adult contemporary radio, based on her life history and style influenced by Fiona Apple. To determine how successful this would be, Reprise partnered with the internet radio website LAUNCHcast, which would include "Somebody" in the adult contemporary playlists and showcase the song to other listeners. The result had "Somebody" being popular more with a younger audience than the adult females that the label expected, with the song eventually becoming the tenth most played on LAUNCHcast and McKee entering the 50 most searched terms on the website's owner, Yahoo!. A new strategy was devised to make McKee appeal to the teen pop demographic while showcasing a subversive attitude. This was illustrated by the album cover with McKee blowing a bubble gum, which the singer describes as "a bit of a play on the bubblegum pop thing, except it looks kind of like a mug shot." The album title was an allusion to McKee's wild life: "'Trouble' was my middle name. It was such a hard time for me. Before I got the deal, I had a very difficult teen life as a drug addict and a runaway." Along with "Somebody", which was featured on the soundtrack album of Win a Date With Tad Hamilton! (2004).

== Reception ==
Professional ratings
Review scores
Source	Rating
AllMusic	2.5/5 stars

Johnny Loftus of AllMusic gave a lukewarm review, saying, "McKee's lyrics about adolescent empowerment and the ways of the heart aren't too different from what's already out there. But the songs still share the album's affected quality. It's as if the quirkier arrangements are intended as image builders, designed to add a spunky flair to the tousled, sassy McKee. Pop music doesn't require much substance -- it's meant to be inviting, familiar, and easily accessible. But while Bonnie McKee's debut features an ultra-modern sound that's been proven successful, its homogenization ends up working against it. Pretty but ultimately empty, Trouble doesn't establish McKee as anything more than another hopeful" Tom Lanham of Paste magazine praised Trouble, which he considered "a great little folk-pop-punk album". MTV News reviewer Sam Lansky would later describe Trouble as "an astonishingly precocious (and criminally underrated) set of soulful pop-rock gems".

== Sales ==
The album disappointed commercially, moving fewer than 17,000 copies. McKee was subsequently dropped from Reprise Records. McKee spoke about the album being unsuccessful, saying, "It was devastating when the album didn't happen," she said. "I realized there are so many steps from getting a deal to having a hit...and I didn't get there. It was a huge letdown." Reflecting on the album's underperformance, considering her eventual success as a songwriter, McKee stated in 2011 that "had Trouble done what I wanted it to, I may have been caught in Hot AC land forever, which is just not my style."

== Track listing ==
All tracks written solely by Bonnie McKee and produced by Rob Cavallo, with co-production by Antonina Armato, except where noted.

No.	Title	Length
1.	"Trouble"	4:05
2.	"When It All Comes Down"	4:08
3.	"Open Your Eyes" (writers; Bonnie McKee, Mark Batson)	5:04
4.	"Somebody"	4:12
5.	"A Voice That Carries"	4:48
6.	"Honey"	4:45
7.	"Green Grass"	4:22
8.	"January" (producers; Bob Power)	4:10
9.	"Marble Steps"	4:30
10.	"Sensitive Subject Matter"	4:05
11.	"I Hold Her" (producers; Bob Power)	3:40 (Hidden on CD)* 3:10 (Digital)*
12.	"Confessions of a Teenage Girl"	3:00
Total length:		50:23

== Credits ==
- Bonnie McKee - vocals, keyboards
- Paul Bushnell - bass on 2–7, 9, 10
- Rob Cavallo - acoustic guitar on 1, 10, 12; electric guitar on 2
- Greg Curtis - 3 (Hammond organ) on 4
- Dan Chase - Pro Tools on 1–7, 9, 10, 12; programming on 2, 4–7, 12
- Luis Conte - percussion on 1, 2
- Eric Ferguson - Pro Tools on 5, 6, 10
- Bashiri Johnson - percussion on 11
- Robbie Kondor - piano on 11
- Abe Laboriel Jr. - drums on 2–5, 7, 9, 10
- Doug McKean - Pro Tools on 1–7, 9, 10, 12
- David McKelvy - harmonica on 2
- Tommy Morgan - harmonica on 5
- Jamie Muhoberac - keyboards on 1–10
- Gary Novak - drums on 5, 6, 10
- Tim Pierce - guitars on 1–7, 9, 10, 12
- Doug Petty - piano on 8
- Bob Power - guitars, keyboards, bass, drums, percussion on 8, 11
- Buddy Schaub - horns on 6
- Pete Wallewski - horns on 6
- Patrick Warren - chamberlin on 4
- Emma Kummrow, Igor Szwec, Gloria Justen, Olga Konopelsky, Ghislaine Fleischmann, Gregory Tepperman - violin on 11
- Davis Barnett, Peter Nocella - viola on 11
- Jennie Lorenzo, James Cooper III - cello on 11

== Production ==
- "January" and "I Hold Her":
  - Producer - Bob Power
  - Recording - Lindsay Marcus, Bob Power, Blair Wells, David Winslow
  - Mixing - Dan Chase ("January"); Bob Power, Blair Wells ("I Hold Her")
- All other tracks:
  - Producer - Rob Cavallo
  - Co-producer - Antonina Armato
  - Recording - Dan Chase, Doug McKean, Allen Sides
  - Mixing - Chris Lord-Alge, Tom Lord-Alge
