= Noah (2014 film) =

2014 film

- Theatrical release poster
- Directed by: Darren Aronofsky
- Written by: Darren Aronofsky; Ari Handel
- Produced by: Scott Franklin; Darren Aronofsky; Mary Parent; Arnon Milchan
- Starring: Russell Crowe; Jennifer Connelly; Ray Winstone; Emma Watson; Logan Lerman; Anthony Hopkins
- Cinematography: Matthew Libatique
- Edited by: Andrew Weisblum
- Music by: Clint Mansell
- Production companies: Regency Enterprises; Protozoa Pictures
- Distributed by: Paramount Pictures
- Release dates: March 10, 2014 (Mexico City premiere); March 28, 2014 (United States)
- Running time: 138 minutes
- Country: United States
- Language: English
- Budget: $125–160 million
- Box office: $359 million

Noah is a 2014 American drama film directed by Darren Aronofsky, who co-wrote the screenplay with Ari Handel. Inspired by the biblical story of Noah's Ark from the Book of Genesis and the Book of Enoch, it stars Russell Crowe as Noah, along with Jennifer Connelly, Ray Winstone, Emma Watson, Logan Lerman, and Anthony Hopkins.

The film was released by Paramount Pictures in North American theaters on March 28, 2014, in 2D and IMAX, while a version converted to 3D and IMAX 3D was released in several other countries. It received generally positive reviews from critics and grossed over $359 million worldwide, making it Aronofsky's highest-grossing film to date.

Although it received praise for its direction and acting, the film also generated controversy, in part due to its perceived environmentalist political messages. It was denied release in China, according to an anonymous source for "religion-related reasons", and was banned in several Muslim countries for its depiction of prophets venerated in Islam.

== Plot ==
As a child, Noah sees his father, Lamech, killed by king Tubal-cain for his land. As an adult, Noah lives with his wife, Naameh, and their sons Shem, Ham, and Japheth. He dreams of a great flood, so he takes his family to consult his grandfather, Methuselah.

On the way, they come across a group of recently killed people and adopt the lone survivor, a girl named Ila. She is treated for an abdominal wound, and Naameh determines she will be unable to bear children. The group is chased by the murderers and escapes into the land of the Watchers, fallen angels that were stranded on Earth as stone creatures after they descended from Heaven to help Adam and Eve when they were banished from the Garden of Eden for eating the Forbidden Fruit.

Methuselah helps Noah understand his visions and gives him a seed from Eden, which he plants nearby. The Watchers arrive the next morning, and, while some presume he is a liar, water spouts from where Noah planted the seed and a mature forest pops up around them. The Watchers are convinced he is serving the Creator. They help him build an ark to preserve life for after the Flood.

Years later, Tubal-cain notices a huge flock of birds flying to the almost-completed ark, followed by snakes, insects, amphibians and reptiles, and leads his followers to confront Noah, who defies Tubal-cain and remarks that there is no escape for the line of Cain whose sins ravaged the land. When the Watchers form a defensive circle, Tubal-cain retreats and begins to build weapons to take the ark. Many animals come to the ark and are sedated with incense to sleep through the Flood.

With Ila in love with Shem, Noah goes to the refugee camp to find wives for his sons. When he witnesses the people's moral decay, he abandons his effort. Devastated by the idea of being alone his entire life, Ham runs into the forest. Naameh begs Noah to reconsider and, when he will not, goes to Methuselah for help. The old man cures Ila's infertility, while Ham befriends a refugee named Na'el.

When the rain begins, Tubal-cain incites his followers to storm the ark. Noah finds Ham in the forest, but leaves Na'el, who is stuck in a foothold trap and is trampled to death. His family enters the ark, except for Methuselah, who remains in the forest and is swept away by the rushing waters. The Watchers hold off Tubal-cain's army, sacrificing themselves and ascending back to Heaven. Tubal-cain slips onto the ark and solicits help from Ham, playing on the boy's anger towards Noah for Na'el's demise.

Ila discovers she is pregnant and tells Noah, who pleads with the Creator not to make him kill the child. The rains stop, seemingly indicating that the Creator wants the child to die, so Noah tells his family that, if the baby is a girl, he will kill her to ensure the future will be uncorrupted by humans.

Nine months later, Ila goes into labor as she and Shem are about to leave the ark on a raft. Naameh begs Noah to spare the child so they will stay, but he instead burns the raft. Ham interrupts to tell Noah the beasts are awake and eating each other where deer-like antelope was killed, which is a ruse so Tubal-cain can attack him. While they fight, Ila gives birth to female twins and the ark hits a mountaintop. Shem attacks his father and Tubal-cain is about to strike Noah with a rock, but Ham kills Tubal-cain with a dagger. Noah finds Ila, intending to kill the babies, but spares them because he finds nothing but love in his heart when he sees his newborn granddaughters.

Upon exiting the ark, Noah, thinking he has failed the Creator and deeming himself a monster, goes into isolation in a cave and makes wine to drown his sorrows. Ham, after witnessing his father's naked drunkenness, leaves to travel alone. Reconciling with his remaining family at Ila's behest, Noah charges his progeny with caring for the world and they witness intense waves of rainbows as symbols of the Creator's blessings.

== Cast ==
- Russell Crowe as Noah
  - Dakota Goyo as younger Noah
- Jennifer Connelly as Naameh, Noah's wife
- Ray Winstone as Tubal-cain, a descendant of Cain and Noah's nemesis
  - Finn Wittrock as younger Tubal-cain
- Emma Watson as Ila, an orphan raised by Noah and Naameh who later becomes Shem's wife
  - Skylar Burke as younger Ila
- Logan Lerman as Ham, Noah and Naameh's middle son
  - Nolan Gross as younger Ham
- Anthony Hopkins as Methuselah, Noah's grandfather
  - Thor Kjartansson as younger Methuselah
- Douglas Booth as Shem, Noah and Naameh's eldest son and Ila's husband
  - Gavin Casalegno as younger Shem
- Leo McHugh Carroll as Japheth, Noah and Naameh's youngest son
- Marton Csokas as Lamech, Noah's father
- Madison Davenport as Na'el, Ham's love interest

=== Voices ===
- Frank Langella as the voice of Og, a Watcher who helps Noah
- Nick Nolte as the voice of Samyaza, the leader of the Watchers
- Mark Margolis as the voice of Magog, a Watcher
- Kevin Durand as the voice of Rameel, a Watcher

== Production ==
=== Development ===
Aronofsky first became interested in the story of Noah and Nemeh in the seventh grade when, as part of a creative writing assignment, he submitted a poem about Noah entitled "The Dove". Years later, after finishing the film Pi, Aronofsky was searching for ideas for his next film and thought a film about Noah would be a good idea. Work on the script began in 2000, but Aronofsky put the project on hold when he learned Hallmark was already working on a similar film. Work on the draft resumed sometime later, and a first draft was completed in 2003.

Aronofsky struggled with how to adapt the story as a feature-length film, since, in the Bible, it is only four chapters long. The biblical text does not include the name of Noah's wife, nor of his sons' wives, but it does mention Noah getting drunk after the flood and getting into an altercation with one of his sons, which gave Aronofsky and his team ideas for events that might have taken place on the ark.

In April 2007, Aronofsky discussed Noah with The Guardian, explaining that he saw Noah as "a dark, complicated character" who experiences "real survivor's guilt" after the flood. Aronofsky was working on early drafts of the script for Noah around the time his first attempt to make The Fountain fell through when actor Brad Pitt left the project.

Ari Handel, who had previously collaborated with Aronofsky on The Fountain, The Wrestler, and Black Swan, helped Aronofsky develop the script. Before they found financial backing for Noah, they collaborated with Canadian artist Niko Henrichon to adapt the script as a graphic novel. The first volume of the graphic novel was released in the French language by Belgian publisher Le Lombard in October 2011 under the title Noé: Pour la cruauté des hommes (Noah: For the Cruelty of Men). After the creation of the graphic novel, Aronofsky struck a deal with Paramount and New Regency to produce a feature film of Noah with a budget of $130 million. Screenwriter John Logan was asked to re-draft the script alongside Aronofsky, but is not credited for his contributions in the completed film.

In October 2012, Emma Watson commented on the setting of the film: "I think what Darren's going for is a sense that it could be set in any time. It could be set sort of like a thousand years in the future or a thousand years in the past. ... You shouldn't be able to place it too much."

=== Themes ===
Ari Handel, the co-writer of Noah, stated:

The story of Noah starts with this concept of strong justice, that the wickedness of man will soon be met with justice, and it ends when the rainbow comes and it says, even though the heart of man is filled with wickedness, I will never again destroy the world ... So it ends with this idea of mercy. God somehow goes from this idea of judging the wickedness to mercy and grace. So we decided that was a powerful and emotional arc to go through, and we decided to give that arc to Noah.

Commenting on God's mercy, Wesley Hill noted in First Things that "near the end of the film, Emma Watson's character, Ila ... says to Noah that perhaps God preserved him because God knew that he had a merciful heart" and that "the film ends up locating the rationale for God's mercy in some native spark of goodness in Noah that will, viewers hope, make the new, post-flood world more livable than the antediluvian one."

The president of the National Religious Broadcasters stated that the Noah film includes "major biblical themes", including "sin, judgment, righteousness, and God as Creator." According to some, the film also promotes the concept of evolutionary creation.

=== Casting ===
Aronofsky offered the role of Noah to Christian Bale and Michael Fassbender, both of whom were unable to take the part due to previous commitments (Bale went on to star as Moses in Ridley Scott's religious epic film Exodus: Gods and Kings). Dakota Fanning was originally cast in the role of Ila, but departed due to a scheduling conflict, and Julianne Moore was considered for the role of Naameh. Liam Neeson, Liev Schreiber, and Val Kilmer were considered for the part of Tubal-cain, for which Aronofsky reportedly wanted an actor "with the grit and size to be convincing as he goes head-to-head against Crowe's Noah character".

=== Filming ===
Principal photography began on 20 July 2012 in Dyrhólaey, Fossvogur, Reynisfjara, and other locations in southern Iceland. Filming wrapped up on 17 November 2012.

Filming also took place in New York state. A set representing Noah's Ark was built at the Planting Fields Arboretum in Upper Brookville, New York. In September 2012, while on a break from filming at a location on Long Island, Russell Crowe and a friend, both of whom had been kayaking for several hours, were rescued by the Coast Guard near Cold Spring Harbor. When Hurricane Sandy subjected New York to heavy rain and flooding in late October 2012, production was put on hold for a time.

=== Post-production ===
Post-production lasted over 14 months, with Aronofsky attempting some of the most complicated and extensive effects ever used in film. Industrial Light and Magic (ILM) said their work on the film represented "the most complicated rendering in the company's history." Regarding the film's extensive use of visual effects, Aronofsky said he and his crew "had to create an entire animal kingdom" using no real animals in the production, but instead creating "slightly tweaked" versions of real creatures. Besides the fictional land-based animals in the film, ILM was also responsible for the Watchers, the forest that sprouted from the seed, the deluge sequence during the battle between the Watchers and Tubal-cain and his army, and the two-minute-long sequence of the history of Earth's creation. To make the Watchers' movements realistic, VFX supervisor Ben Snow and Aronofsky studied footage of real ballet dancers from the director's Oscar-winning drama Black Swan.

=== Music ===
The musical score for Noah was composed by Clint Mansell, who had scored all of Aronofsky's earlier feature films, and performed by Kronos Quartet. The film also features two original songs: "Father Song (Lullaby)" (written by Patti Smith, Lenny Kaye, and Russell Crowe), which is sung by both Russell Crowe's and Emma Watson's characters during the film, and "Mercy Is" (written by Smith and Kaye), which Smith, backed by the Kronos Quartet, sings over the end credits. The latter was nominated for a Golden Globe Award for Best Original Song. A soundtrack album was released by Nonesuch Records on March 26, 2014.

=== Test screenings ===
In mid-2013, Aronofsky and Paramount began sparring over final cut, with Paramount seeking to test unfinished, unscored, and alternate cuts of the film, despite Aronofsky's objections. Paramount proceeded to test-screen the film, prompting "worrisome" responses from largely religious audiences in October 2013. After much discussion and compromise, the studio announced on February 12, 2014, that Darren Aronofsky's version, not any of the studio's alternative versions, would be the final cut of Noah. Aronofsky said: "They tried what they wanted to try, and eventually they came back. My version of the film hasn't been tested ... It's what we wrote and what was green-lighted."

Under pressure from Christian religious groups, Paramount Pictures added a disclaimer to marketing materials in February 2014, which read:

The film is inspired by the story of Noah. While artistic license has been taken, we believe that this film is true to the essence, values and integrity of a story that is a cornerstone of faith for millions of people worldwide. The biblical story of Noah can be found in the book of Genesis.

== Release ==
=== Box office ===
Noah had its world premiere in Mexico City on March 10, 2014. In North America, the film grossed a little over $43.7 million during its opening weekend—more than any of Aronofsky's previous films—and debuted in first place at the box office—a first for Aronofsky. The opening weekend was also the biggest ever for a film featuring Russell Crowe as the lead actor.

Internationally, the film's releases in Russia and Brazil were the largest ever for a non-sequel, and were the fourth-biggest openings of all time, with $17.2 million and $9.8 million, respectively. The opening in Russia was the largest ever for a Paramount film. In South Korea, the film grossed $1.1 million on its opening day, the highest in 2014 for the country.

The film grossed $101 million in North America and $258 million in other countries, making a worldwide gross of $359 million. The film was declared "an unmitigated hit ... by almost every measure."

=== Tie-in events ===
In connection with the release of the film in North America, Aronofsky commissioned artists to create original works inspired by the Biblical story of Noah, stating, "The Noah story belongs to all of us—every religion, every culture, every citizen of planet Earth." The collection, titled Fountains of the Deep: Visions of Noah and Flood, was open to the public for the month of March 2014 in the Soho district of New York City. Contributing artists included Ugo Rondinone, Karen Kilimnik, Mike Nelson, Nan Goldin, Jim Lee, Robert Liefeld, Jim Woodring, Simon Bisley, graffiti duo FAILE, and James Jean.

On the eve of the film's release in Reykjavik, Iceland, Aronofsky teamed up with Björk to host an environmental benefit concert in response to proposed anti-conservationist policy changes by the Icelandic government, with guest performances by Björk, Patti Smith, Lykke Li, Russell Crowe, and Of Monsters and Men.

=== Home media ===
Noah was released on Blu-ray Disc and DVD on July 29, 2014. In August 2014, a 3D Blu-ray edition was also released in Italy and Germany.

== Reception ==
=== Critical response ===
The review aggregator website Rotten Tomatoes reported that 75% of 263 critics gave the film a positive review with an average rating of 6.7/10. The website's critics consensus reads: "With sweeping visuals grounded by strong performances in service of a timeless tale told on a human scale, Darren Aronofsky's Noah brings the Bible epic into the 21st century." On Metacritic, the film has a score of 68 out of 100, based on 46 critics, indicating "generally favorable reviews". Audiences polled by CinemaScore gave the film an average grade of "C" on a scale of A+ to F.

Peter Travers of Rolling Stone wrote of the film: "a film of grit, grace, and visual wonders that for all its tech-head modernity is built on a spiritual core ... In this flawed, fiercely relevant film, wonders never cease." Richard Corliss of Time said: "Darren Aronofsky brings out wild ambition and thrilling artistry to one of the Old Testament's best-known, most dramatic, least plausible stories—Noah and the Ark—with Russell Crowe infusing the role of God's first seaman and zookeeper with all his surly majesty." Kathleen Parker, writing in The Washington Post, called the film "Noah's Arc of Triumph" and said: "If you like Braveheart, Gladiator, Star Wars, The Lord of the Rings, Indiana Jones, or Titanic, you will like Noah. If you like two or more of the above, you will love Noah." Richard Roeper called the film "One of the most dazzling and unforgettable Biblical epics ever put on film."

The film also had its detractors. IndieWire claimed that "Aronofsky's worst movie is an epic misfire that, like the source material, offers plenty of lessons even if you don't buy the whole package." The Wrap called the film "Darren Aronofsky's Biblical Waterworld". The New Yorker's David Denby wrote: "Darren Aronofsky's Noah—an epic farrago of tumultuous water, digital battle, and environmentalist rage ... is the craziest big movie in years. Noah may not make much sense, but only an artist could have made it."

=== Racial issues ===
The film was challenged for its lack of non-white cast members. Reverend Wil Gafney, a womanist and associate professor of Hebrew and Old Testament at the Lutheran Theological Seminary at Philadelphia, saw the film as a throwback to the Hollywood era of all-white casts and considered it worrisome in today's more multi-ethnic America. She went on to state, "The Bible is the most multicultural piece of literature that most people will ever read. So a film about the Bible should reflect that diversity."

Efrem Smith, of Los Angeles-based World Impact, critiqued the film as a throwback to the 1956 classic The Ten Commandments, where an all-white cast played Moses and Pharaoh. Smith stated that Noah deals with the curse of Ham by "simply erasing people of color from the story."

Anthea Butler, an associate professor of religious studies at the University of Pennsylvania, said the casting choices send a troubling message: "It's a world where only white people get saved ... this doesn't look like the world that God created."

However, "fittingly for a Biblical story", two of the characters are played by Jewish actors (Jennifer Connelly and Logan Lerman). Co-writer Ari Handel addressed the concerns surrounding race in an interview, where he stated: "From the beginning, we were concerned about casting, the issue of race. What we realized is that this story is functioning at the level of myth, and as a mythical story, the race of the individuals doesn't matter."

=== Christian and Jewish response ===
After the British premiere of the film, Russell Crowe traveled to Lambeth Palace to discuss "faith and spirituality" with Justin Welby, Archbishop of Canterbury and leader of the worldwide Anglican Communion, and Welby subsequently called Noah "interesting and thought-provoking". In addition, several Christian organizations in the United States of America expressed support for the film, "including leaders from organizations like the American Bible Society, National Catholic Register, The King's College (New York), Q Ideas, Hollywood Prayer Network, and Focus on the Family." Focus on the Family president Jim Daly stated: "[Noah] is a creative interpretation of the scriptural account that allows us to imagine the deep struggles Noah may have wrestled with as he answered God's call on his life. This cinematic vision of Noah's story gives Christians a great opportunity to engage our culture with the biblical Noah, and to have conversations with friends and family about matters of eternal significance." Cultural commenter Bishop Robert Barron praised the film for its inclusion of "God, creation, providence, sin, obedience, salvation: not bad for a major Hollywood movie!" Darren Aronofsky later tweeted that Barron's "thoughts" were a "smart take".

Rabbi Shmuley Boteach, an Orthodox Jewish rabbi leader and author, hailed Noah as "a valuable film, especially for our times." In order to create "a story that tries to explicate Noah's relationship with God and God's relationship with the world as it has become", Aronofsky stated that he was working in "the tradition of Jewish Midrash".

The film generated controversy among some Christians. Some disliked the film because God is not mentioned by name, being referred to instead as "the Creator". Ken Ham and Ray Comfort, both young-Earth creationists, objected to the film, with the latter apologist creating his own documentary, Noah and the Last Days, as a response.

Producer Scott Franklin told Entertainment Weekly that "Noah is a very short section of the Bible with a lot of gaps, so we definitely had to take some creative expression in it. But I think we stayed very true to the story and didn't really deviate from the Bible, despite the six-armed angels." Kevin Hall, professor of biblical and theological studies and the Ida Elizabeth and J. W. Hollums chair of Bible at Oklahoma Baptist University, observed that "the story in Genesis is extremely concise, so some creativity with the tale—especially by Hollywood—is hardly a surprise."

=== Muslim response and censorship ===
Prior to its release, the film was banned in Bahrain, Kuwait, Qatar, Saudi Arabia, the United Arab Emirates, Malaysia, and Indonesia because it was seen by the governments of those countries as contradicting the teachings of Islam. A representative of Paramount Pictures stated: "Censors for Qatar, Bahrain and the UAE officially confirmed this week that the film will not release in their countries." The film was also disapproved of by the Al-Azhar University in Egypt, as it was seen as violating Islamic law and could "provoke the feelings of believers". Mohammad Zareef from Pakistan's Central Board of Film Censors said they tended to steer clear of films with a religious theme, adding: "We haven't seen it yet, but I don't think it can go to the cinemas in Pakistan." However, the DVD release was to be available in Pakistan.

== Literature ==
- Mark Morris. Noah: The Official Movie Novelization. Titan Books, 2014. ISBN 978-1783292561
- Jadranka Skorin-Kapov. Darren Aronofsky's films and the fragility of hope. New York: Bloomsbury Academic, 2015.

== See also ==
- List of films based on the Bible
- Whitewashing in film
