= Word Power =

Word Power may refer to:

- Word Power (album), a 1989 album by Divine Styler
  - Wordpower, Vol. 2: Directrix, a 1999 album by Divine Styler
- Word Power, a 1967 board game published by Avalon Hill
- Word Power Books, a Scottish bookshop and publisher
- Reader's Digest National Word Power Challenge, an American vocabulary competition
