= Wordpower, Vol. 2: Directrix =

Word Power, Vol. 2: Directrix

Studio album by Divine Styler
- Released: February 9, 1999
- Recorded: 1997–1998
- Studio: Rumbo Studios, Abbey; Islington, London
- Genre: Alternative hip hop
- Length: 1:08:31
- Label: Mo' Wax
- Producer: Divine Styler (also exec.); Bilal Bashir

Divine Styler chronology
Spiral Walls Containing Autumns of Light (1992)	Word Power, Vol. 2: Directrix (1999)	Def Mask (2014)

Professional ratings
Review scores
Source	Rating
AllMusic	4/5 stars
Phase 9	5/6 stars

Wordpower, Vol. 2: Directrix is the third album by Divine Styler, released in 1999 on Mo' Wax. This was his first album released in seven years, his last being 1992's Spiral Walls Containing Autumns of Light. However, this album could be considered more as a sequel to his debut album, Word Power, due to the "Vol. 2" in the album's name and because of the more straightforward hip hop the album contains when compared to the wildly experimental Spiral Walls. This album features Divine Styler's Original Scheme Team member(s) Cokni O'Dire (only on the re-released version) and Bilal Bashir.

The album was later re-released in 2000 on Toy's Factory with an alternative cover, and an altered track listing.

== Track listing ==
No.	Title	Writer(s)	Length
1.	"The Ahdan"	Imam Iman	2:20
2.	"Contact 1" (featuring Hitomi Okuno)	Mark Richardson	1:16
3.	"Al Faatihah"	Richardson	1:19
4.	"Satan Dynasty Killer 1"	Richardson	3:03
5.	"Unseen Letter"	Richardson	3:21
6.	"Triple Irons"	Richardson; Nazareth Nirza	4:20
7.	"Oneself Duel"	Richardson	4:01
8.	"The Grand Design" (featuring Cokni O'Dire)	Richardson; Otis Olivier Lyjasu Williams	4:12
9.	"Before Mecca"	Richardson	3:32
10.	"Contact 2" (featuring Hitomi Okuno)	Richardson	1:27
11.	"Hajji"	Richardson	4:00
12.	"Time Fold 79" (featuring Cokni O'Dire)	Richardson	2:02
13.	"Directrix"	Richardson; Bilal Bashir	3:28
14.	"Nova" (featuring Styles Of Beyond)	Richardson; Takbir Bashir; Ryan Maginn	4:12
15.	"Make It Plain" (featuring Gola Jaisv)	Richardson; Bashir	4:28
16.	"Microphenia" (featuring Styles Of Beyond)	Richardson; Bashir; Maginn	4:32
17.	"Satan Dynasty Killa 2" (featuring Exceed)	Richardson; E. Estrada	4:04
18.	"Sound Quest" (featuring Quin)	Richardson	5:11
19.	"Directrix (Optical Mix 2000)"	Richardson; Bashir	6:23
20.	"Directrix (Indopepsydnics Remix)"	Richardson; Bashir	6:32
Total length:			1:08:31

== Personnel ==
- Mark Richardson - main artist, executive producer, producer (tracks: 1–12, 14, 16–18), recording (tracks: 1–7, 9–17)
- Otis Olivier Lyjasu Williams - guest vocals (tracks: 8, 12)
- Takbir Bashir - guest vocals (tracks: 14, 16)
- Ryan Maginn - guest vocals (tracks: 14, 16)
- Hitomi Okuno - guest vocals (tracks: 2, 10)
- Gola Jaisv Richardson - guest vocals (track 15)
- Exceed - guest vocals (track 17)
- Quin - guest vocals (track 18)
- Bilal Bashir - producer (tracks: 13, 15, 19–20)
- Nazareth Nirza - scratches (tracks: 6, 11, 13, 19–20)
- John Tejada - scratches (track 4)
- Shawn Berman - mixing, recording (tracks: 8, 18)
- Ben Drury - artwork
- Sølve Sundsbø - photography
