= Tranquility Bass =

- Born: Michael Adam Kandel; 1967 or 1968; Chicago, Illinois, United States
- Origin: Los Angeles, California, United States
- Died: May 17, 2015 (aged 47)
- Genres: Trip hop, ambient house
- Years active: 1991–2015
- Labels: Astralwerks, Exist Dance

Tranquility Bass was the stage name of Michael Adam Kandel (1967/1968 – May 17, 2015), an American musician whose music has been variously categorized as ambient house, trip hop, and funk rock. He released various singles during the 1990s, followed by his first full-length album, Let The Freak Flag Fly, in 1997 on Astralwerks.

== Early life ==
Kandel was born and raised in Chicago. He learned to play the guitar and keyboards at age 12. By age 15 he had begun to record experimental electronic music in his bedroom.

== Musical career ==
Kandel attended the Chicago Academy for the Arts, after which he moved to Los Angeles in 1985 to attend CalArts. It was there that he met Tom Chasteen, with whom he started the Exist Dance label in 1991. The two released several singles, including some as Tranquility Bass, later that year. In 1993, Kandel released the single "They Came in Peace", which has been described as an ambient-house classic and appeared on the Mo' Wax compilation album Headz the following year. After the duo released this and a few other singles, including two songs that appeared on the FFRR compilation album California Dreaming in 1994, Chasteen left Tranquility Bass and relocated to Tucson. Tranquility Bass's touring bassist, Matt Lux, is also the bassist for Chicago-based band Isotope 217.

=== Let the Freak Flag Fly ===
In 1994, after Chasteen's departure, Kandel joined Tyler Vlaovich to record an album on Lopez Island in Washington. More than two years later, the album was released as Let the Freak Flag Fly on Astralwerks Records. Kandel sometimes ceased talking to people, or from using his voice, for two or three days on end during the recording process. According to Billboard, the album led to Kandel developing "a cult following that spans several genres beyond the dance realm." The Los Angeles Times gave the album a rating of three stars (out of four) and described it as "the electronic progeny of acid rock." It was also reviewed favorably by Greg Kot, who described it as "a grand journey through nearly a century of recorded music, a densely layered montage of electronic manipulations and live instruments made under conditions that were certainly unusual." The album contained the song "We All Want To Be Free", made more popular by its airplay on MTV's Amp.

=== Heartbreaks & Hallelujahs ===
After a long hiatus from studio recording and rumors of drug abuse, Kandel returned in 2012 with a sophomore effort entitled Heartbreaks & Hallelujahs. The album was completed on March 21, 2002. Kandel reportedly tried to have the album released on multiple labels, only to have each of them fold after he sent it to them. The album ended up being released on Exist Dance, although it is readily available in digital format on Amazon MP3 and iTunes. The album is mostly new material with the exception of yet another remix of an early-days single, "Mike's House". Kandel seemed to try to get away from the idea of being an electronic musician (although some of the album still has electronics), with a dose of various types of rock music such as funk rock and surf rock.

== Death ==
Kandel died on May 17, 2015, aged 47 in Chicago suburb Buffalo Grove, IL. A cause of death was not released to the public.
