= Exist Dance =

American record label

Exist Dance was an American, Los Angeles based record label started by Tom Chasteen and Michael Kandel in 1991. Releasing the music of Tranquility Bass, Eden Transmission, Merge, Freaky Chakra, and more, they were part of the early development of trance, techno, breaks, and chill out music on the West Coast of the United States.

== Origins ==
Tom Chasteen met Michael Kandel at Cal Arts and they became friends through a shared love of music and record collecting. Kandel says, "we were both avid record collectors. We were buying everything. Our musical tastes are still very eclectic.” The two started Exist Dance after hearing early Acid House music from the UK and being drawn in by the "extreme psychedelic nature" of the genre.

== Heaven Studio ==
Chasteen and Kandel started a studio called "Heaven" in an industrial loft in the Skid Row district of Downtown Los Angeles.

DJ Dan says of the studio:

"In ’91, I went... there was gear everywhere. It was a hot mess. Downtown was super bombed out... You had to go through these fences to get through, and then take a lift elevator to their apartment … I remember thinking to myself, these guys are real musicians. They’re hardcore."

"Heaven" played a role in the label's mythology, with "Recorded in Heaven" or "Mixed in Heaven" often appearing on release labels. The label's first compilation was called Transmitting from Heaven, another reference to the studio space.

== Style and influence ==
Exist Dance releases were inspired by the Acid House sound of the Second Summer of Love, in conversation with the all night electronic music events that were happening on the West Coast of California, like Dubtribe Sound System, Wicked Sound System, their counterparts in Los Angeles such as Insomniac and other clandestine collectives. This led the label to release a mix of house, techno, trance, breaks, and downtempo, soundtracking outdoor parties which often went through sunrise into the afternoon with a diverse range of music to suit the ever changing mood of attendees.

DJ Garth, founder of Wicked Sound System says of Exist Dance:

“In 1991, there was only one West Coast label releasing the kind of music that fueled those all-night renegade parties. Their deep, psychedelic techno breakbeats were a perfect compliment to what we were doing at the time … truly a visionary label.”

KCRW DJ Jason Bentley says of the labels releases:

"Tom Chasteen and Mike Kandel were way ahead of their time. As far as independent dance labels and a uniquely psychedelic dance sound, it was one of the earliest links from a '60s/'70s rock aesthetic to the burgeoning dance music scene in the early '90s. They had no rule book or template. The different things they were releasing ranged in style and tempo. I think the intent just had to be sacred and transformative.”

Many of the artists who released on the label were aliases for the founders' themselves. While their releases did not top the charts, they were popular among DJs playing the emerging sounds of trance, ambient house, breakbeat, and techno around the world.

== Shifting focus and legacy ==
Around 1994, Chasteen and Kandel took some time off from managing the label. The pair went their separate ways in what was "more like the parting of college roommates than a band breakup." As "a source close to the group" said to CMJ in 1997, "Mike got the band name and Tom got the label name." Kandel moved to a small island in the pacific northwest and worked for two years on the first Tranquility Bass solo LP "Let The Freak Flag Fly" which came out on Astralwerks along with three singles. Chasteen provided two remixes for the single "La La La" under the name Skull Valley. These releases were distributed widely, and received recognition and acclaim as part of a wave of downtempo, ambient house, breakbeat, big beat, and chill out music that had commercial success at the time.

At the same time in 1997, Chasteen returned to managing Exist Dance, which would continue releasing music until around 2004. Throughout that period 12" sales were in decline, the music industry was disrupted by digital distribution, and Chasteen began focusing on other ventures.

In 2000, Chasteen started the weekly Dub Reggae event "Dub Club" at The Echo in Echo Park Los Angeles, inviting dub reggae artists from around the world to perform. Chasteen regularly DJs at the event.

In 2011, Exist Dance surfaced on Bandcamp, where they issued high quality digital versions of their first compilation, as well as music from Tranquility Bass, Eden Transmission, and Voodoo Transmission previously unavailable in high quality digital formats.

In 2013, Chasteen partnered with Stones Throw Records to release new music from classic dub musicians, often acting as the mixing engineer. Besides releases under the name 'Dub Club' he also has a project called Natural Numbers which brings together Dub musicians from around the world to record, and then mixes the tracks from the mixing desk with echo and reverb in classic dubwise style.

Exist Dance remains a document of Los Angeles' role in early 1990s global electronic music culture.

Michael Kandel died in 2015 of natural causes.

== Releases ==
Their complete catalogue.

=== 12" ===
- ED 001 Merge - You Move Me
- ED 002 Tranquility Bass - They Came In Peace
- ED 003 High Lonesome Sound System - Love Night
- ED 004 High Lonesome Sound System - We're Go
- ED 005 Eden Transmission - I'm So High
- ED 006 Odyssey 2000 - The Odyssey / Hop On Pop
- ED 007 Voodoo Transmission - Voodoo Fire
- ED 008 High Lonesome Sound System - Waiting For The Lights
- ED 009 Up Above The World - Straight Up Caffeine
- ED 010 Freaky Chakra - Halucifuge
- ED 011 Up Above The World - Trying To Reach Sawaan
- ED 012 Tranquility Bass - Broadcast Standard Issue No. 1
- ED 013 Tranquility Bass - Broadcast Standard Issue No. 2
- ED 014 Cap'm Stargazer VS Commander Mindfuck - Untitled
- ED 015 Off And Gone - Off And Gone
- ED 016 Commander Mindfuck / The What of Sane - Whiskey And Blood / The House That Tyler Built
- ED 017 High Lonesome Sound System - Champion Sound Remixes
- ED 018 Le Pimp - Hijack Party
- ED 019 Ballistic Mystic - Miami
- ED 020 Ballistic Mystic - Rock The Place
- ED 021 Tom Chasteen - Salome
- ED 022 Skull Valley - Green Woman EP
- ED 023 Skull Valley - Granite Mountain Morning
- ED 024 Ballistic Mystic - Imperial Cruise EP
- ED 025 Tom Chasteen - Together
- ED 026 Tom Chasteen - Together
- ED 027 Dada Munchamonkey - The Operator
- ED 028 Heaven & Earth - The Business
- ED 029 Heaven & Earth - Very Happy
- ED 030 Tom Chasteen - Steam Dream
- ED 031 Ballistic Mystic - Imperial Cruise Remixes
- ED 032 Dada Munchamonkey - Outside Time (Remix)
- ED 033 The Hand - The Hand
- ED 034 Various Artists - Musical Rampage Volume One
- ED 035 Various Artists - Musical Rampage Volume Two
- ED 036 Various Artists - Musical Rampage Volume Three
- ED 037 Renee Ruffin - Now I Know
- ED 038 Heaven & Earth - The Flippet & The Bouncet
- ED 039 Tom Chasteen - Salome (Remixes)
- ED 040 Tom Chasteen - Caramel Blond
- ED 043 Tom Chasteen - Movin
- ED 044 Ballistic Mystic - Fire Burning
- ED 045 Tom Chasteen - Clean Heart

=== CD ===
- ED CD 001 Various Artists - Transmitting From Heaven
- ED CD 002 Dada Munchamonkey - Dada Munchamonkey
- ED CD 003 Bombshelter DJ's Emile And Radar - Future's Past
- ED CD 004 Dada Munchamonkey - Rebaked
- ED CD 005 Various Artists - Put Your Hands Together

=== Digital ===
- ED DD 001 Various Artists - Transmitting From Heaven
- ED DD 002 Tranquility Bass - A Hundred Billion Stars
- ED DD 003 Tranquility Bass - Broadcast Standard Series
- ED DD 004 Tranquility Bass - Heartbreaks & Hallelujahs
- ED DD 005 Tranquility Bass - Mike's House
- ED DD 006 Michael Kandel, Wesley Owen - the "God Particle"
- ED DD 009 For Tourist Only: The Complete Voodoo & Eden Transmissions
