= Headz =

Compilation album series

Headz is a series of compilation albums released by the Mo' Wax record label. The first installment, titled Headz, was released on 31 October 1994, and reissued on 20 May 1996. It was followed on 28 October 1996 by Headz 2A and Headz 2B.

Fact's 2015 list of the best trip hop albums of all time included the first Headz album at number 30, and Headz 2A and Headz 2B jointly at number seven.

== Headz ==
Headz

Compilation album by various artists
- Released: 31 October 1994
- Genre: Trip hop
- Length: 136:13
- Label: Mo' Wax

Headz chronology
Headz (1994)	Headz 2A (1996)

Professional ratings
Review scores
Source	Rating
AllMusic	4/5 stars
The Guardian	3/4 stars

=== Track listing ===
Disc one
No.	Title	Writer(s)	Producer(s)	Length
1.	"Freedom Now (Meditation)" (performed by Patterson)	David Patterson	Patterson	7:56
2.	"Contemplating Jazz" (performed by Attica Blues)	Charlie Williams; Tony Nwachukwu	D'Afro; T Plays It Cool!	5:45
3.	"Symmetrical Jazz" (Flapper Till 5AM mix) (performed by Awunsound)	Andrew McGroarty	DJ A. Won	10:28
4.	"Stars" (performed by Nightmares on Wax)	George Evelyn	E.A.S.E.	7:15
5.	"Ravers Suck Our Sound" (performed by La Funk Mob)	Hubert Blanc-Francard	Boombass; Zdar	5:19
6.	"Miles Out of Time (Astrocentric Mix 'n' Beats)" (performed by M.F. Outa 'National)	Joseph Malik; Calvin Nuttall	Malik; Nuttall	5:03
7.	"The Inside" (performed by RPM)	Stef Cartwright; Peter Adjaye; Joseph Hipkin	RPM	6:44
8.	"Lowride" (performed by Autechre)	Rob Brown; Sean Booth	Autechre	7:12
9.	"Wildstyle – The Krush Handshake" (performed by Olde Scottish)		Howie B	8:03
Total length:				63:45

Disc two
No.	Title	Writer(s)	Producer(s)	Length
1.	"Lost and Found (S.F.L.)" (performed by DJ Shadow)	Josh Davis	DJ Shadow	10:07
2.	"Destroy All Monsters" (performed by Skull)	Trevor Jackson	Underdog	6:24
3.	".....Don't Fake It" (performed by Deflon Sallahr)	Sallahr	Sallahr	6:19
4.	"2000" (performed by RPM)	Cartwright; Adjaye; Hipkin	RPM	6:18
5.	"Slipper Suite" (part one: "Jeremy's Velvet Slippers" / part two: "Moonraker" / part three: "Unspeakable Acts") (performed by Palm Skin Productions)	Simon Richmond	Richmond	8:24
6.	"The Time Has Come" (performed by Unkle and The Major Force Orchestra)	Toshio Nakanishi; Masayuki Kudo; James Lavelle; Tim Goldsworthy	Nakanishi; Kudo; Lavelle; Goldsworthy	7:55
7.	"Head West – Gun Fight at the O.K. Corrall" (performed by Howie B. Inc.)	Howard Bernstein	Howie B	6:08
8.	"They Came in Peace" (performed by Tranquility Bass)	Tom Chasteen; Michael Kandel	Chasteen; Kandel	8:41
9.	"In-Flux" (alternative interlude '93 version) (performed by DJ Shadow)	Davis	DJ Shadow	12:12
Total length:				72:28

=== Charts ===
Chart (1994)	Peak position
UK Compilation Albums (OCC)	36
UK Dance Albums (OCC)	2

== Headz 2A ==
Headz 2A

Compilation album by various artists
- Released: 28 October 1996
- Genre: Trip hop
- Length: 155:15
- Label: Mo' Wax

Headz chronology
Headz (1994)	Headz 2A (1996)	Headz 2B (1996)

Singles from Headz 2A
- 1. "Shadow's Legitimate Mix" / "Kemuri ('94 Part II)" Released: 23 September 1996; 2. "Covert Action" / "Cabin Fever" Released: 23 September 1996

Professional ratings
Review scores
Source	Rating
AllMusic	4.5/5 stars
The Guardian	4/5 stars
Spin	7/10

=== Track listing ===
Disc one
No.	Title	Writer(s)	Producer(s)	Length
1.	"A Nights Interlude" (performed by Nightmares on Wax)	George Evelyn; Kevin Harper; John Sebastian; Steve Boone; Mark Sebastian	Nightmares on Wax	3:26
2.	"Cantona Style" (performed by The Prunes)	Peder Pedersen; Simon Bonde; Christian Buksti	The Prunes	5:47
3.	"The Real Thing" (90 BPM version) (performed by Peshay)	Paul Pesce	Peshay	7:04
4.	"Modulor" (Modulor mix) (performed by Air)	Nicolas Godin	Solid	6:02
5.	"Searchin'" (performed by The Dust Brothers)	John King; Michael Simpson		4:29
6.	"Flow" (performed by RPM)	Stef Cartwright; Peter Adjaye; Joseph Hipkin	RPM	5:58
7.	"My Bloody Valentine" (performed by DJ Wally)		DJ Wally	7:09
8.	"Garage Piano" (performed by Unkle)	James Lavelle; Tim Goldsworthy; Masayuki Kudo; Mark Nishita	Unkle; Nishita	5:28
9.	"Kemuri ('94 Part II)" (performed by DJ Krush)		DJ Krush	4:44
10.	"Do You Understand?" (performed by Sam Sever and the R.O.T.L.A.)	Sam Sever	Sever	4:39
11.	"What Is Soul?" (instrumental) (performed by Stereo MC's)	Rob Birch; Nick Hallam	Stereo MC's	4:53
12.	"Covert Action" (performed by Urban Tribe)	Sherard Ingram	Ingram	5:47
13.	"Cabin Fever" (performed by Lo-Fi Sensibilities)	Steve Paton	Paton	6:20
14.	"Code" (performed by Midnight Funk Association)	Mark Broom; Dave Hill	Broom; Hill	5:56
Total length:				77:42

Disc two
No.	Title	Writer(s)	Producer(s)	Length
1.	"Concentric Circle" (performed by DJ Food)	Patrick Carpenter; Jonathan More; Matt Black	Coldcut; PC	6:23
2.	"27 Years of Solitude" (performed by Cool Breeze)	Charlie Lexton	Lexton	5:39
3.	"Discotron" (performed by Stasis)	Steve Pickton	Stasis	7:45
4.	"Mango Maracatu" (performed by Scott Free and Cybil Ant)	Free; Ant	Free; Ant	4:40
5.	"The Source of Uncertainty" (performed by Tortoise)	Dan Bitney; Bundy K. Brown; John Herndon; Doug McCombs; John McEntire	Tortoise	3:45
6.	"Karmacoma" (Unkle Situation mix; instrumental) (performed by Massive Attack)	Robert Del Naja; Grantley Marshall; Andrew Vowles; Adrian Thaws; Bob Locke; Tim Norfolk	Massive Attack; Nellee Hooper; Unkle	5:29
7.	"Bodhisattva Vow" (instrumental) (performed by Beastie Boys)	Mike Diamond; Adam Horovitz; Adam Yauch	Beastie Boys; Mario Caldato Jr.	3:17
8.	"Simean Groove" (performed by Folk Implosion)	Lou Barlow; John Davis	Wally Gagel; Tim O'Heir	3:14
9.	"Martian Economics" (performed by Olde Scottish)	Howard Bernstein; Kudo; Toshio Nakanishi	Bernstein; Kudo; Nakanishi	5:24
10.	"Eastward" (Forme remix) (performed by Urban Tribe)	Ingram	Ingram	6:21
11.	"Spacewalk" (performed by Lunar Funk)	Alex Reece; Paul Saunders	Reece; Saunders	6:20
12.	"New Element" (performed by Forme)	Richard File; Will Bankhead	File; Bankhead	5:59
13.	"Pressure II" (performed by Solo)	Mark Wilkins	DJ Solo	6:46
14.	"Organized Crime" (performed by Innervisions)	Jamie Spratling	J Majik	6:31
Total length:				77:33

=== Charts ===
Chart (1996)	Peak position
UK Compilation Albums (OCC)	30
UK Dance Albums (OCC)	4

== Headz 2B ==
Headz 2B

Compilation album by various artists
- Released: 28 October 1996
- Genre: Trip hop
- Length: 153:01
- Label: Mo' Wax

Headz chronology
Headz 2A (1996)	Headz 2B (1996)

Singles from Headz 2B
- 1. "Shadow's Legitimate Mix" / "Kemuri ('94 Part II)" Released: 23 September 1996; 2. "The Real Thing" / "In the Mood" Released: 30 September 1996

Professional ratings
Review scores
Source	Rating
AllMusic	4/5 stars
The Guardian	4/5 stars
Spin	8/10

=== Track listing ===
Disc one
No.	Title	Writer(s)	Producer(s)	Length
1.	"Spectral Arc" (performed by Luminis)	Stef Cartwright	Luminis	6:21
2.	"Sharp A2" (performed by Luke Vibert)	Vibert	Vibert	6:50
3.	"World Lesson Part II" (performed by Money Mark)	Mark Nishita	Nishita	2:33
4.	"Swiss Air" (performed by Twig Bud)	Peter Adshead	Adshead	4:20
5.	"Time Has Come" (Portishead Plays Unkle mix) (performed by Unkle)	Tim Goldsworthy; Masayuki Kudo; James Lavelle	Goldsworthy; Kudo; Lavelle; Portishead; Adrian Utley	4:20
6.	"It's Coming" (performed by Grantby)	Dan Grigson; Si John	Grigson; John	6:16
7.	"Wirecutter" (performed by Donut Productions)	Donut Productions	Donut Productions; The Front Bumper Project	5:03
8.	"The Groomsman" (performed by The Dust Brothers)	John King; Michael Simpson		3:23
9.	"Crash" (performed by Skull)	Trevor Jackson	Underdog	6:01
10.	"Flute Loop" (instrumental) (performed by Beastie Boys)	Mike Diamond; Adam Horovitz; Adam Yauch; Mario Caldato Jr.; Al Kooper	Beastie Boys; Caldato	2:04
11.	"Maze" (performed by DJ Krush)	Hideaki Ishi	DJ Krush	5:20
12.	"Sketch" (performed by Attica Blues)	Attica Blues	Attica Blues	3:22
13.	"Ultimatum Ultra Mix (Jungle Beats/Jungle Bass)" (performed by Jungle Brothers)		Phillip Hall; Michael Small; Ultimatum	4:30
14.	"Science Fu Beats" (performed by Danny Breaks)	Danny Whiddett	Danny Breaks	5:40
15.	"Future Tense" (performed by The Force)	Illian Walker	The Force	7:17
Total length:				73:20

Disc two
No.	Title	Writer(s)	Producer(s)	Length
1.	"The Beast" (System remix) (performed by Palm Skin Productions)	Simon Richmond	Richmond; Roni Size; Krust; Suv	5:47
2.	"The Real Thing" (performed by Peshay)	Paul Pesce	Peshay	9:11
3.	"In the Mood" (performed by Dillinja)	Karl Francis	Francis	6:08
4.	"Tribetoon" (performed by Roni Size and DJ Krust)	Ryan Williams; Kirk Thompson	Roni Size; DJ Krust	6:18
5.	"The Silent Witness" (performed by Source Direct)	James Baker; Phil Aslett	Source Direct	7:04
6.	"The Counterpoint" (performed by As One)	Kirk Degiorgio	Degiorgio	8:10
7.	"Bug in the Bassbin" (Street mix) (performed by Innerzone Orchestra)	Carl Craig	Craig	4:39
8.	"Object Orient" (performed by Black Dog Productions)	Ed Handley; Andy Turner; Ken Downie	Black Dog Productions	5:44
9.	"Trilogy" (performed by Special Forces)	Rupert Parkes	Parkes	13:41
10.	"Quiddity (Last Visit)" (performed by Max 404)	Erwin van Moll	Van Moll	6:32
11.	"Shadow's Legitimate Mix" (performed by Zimbabwe Legit)	Josh Davis	DJ Shadow	6:27
Total length:				79:41

=== Charts ===
Chart (1996)	Peak position
UK Compilation Albums (OCC)	34
UK Dance Albums (OCC)	5
