= Spiral Walls Containing Autumns of Light =

Studio album by Divine Styler
- Released: March 27, 1992
- Recorded: April–May 1991
- Studio: Eve Jim Studios, Los Angeles; Ameraycan Studios, North Hollywood
- Genre: Experimental hip hop; industrial hip hop; funk; alternative rock; spoken word; outsider music
- Length: 68:47
- Label: Giant/Reprise/Warner Bros. 24444
- Producer: Divine Styler

Divine Styler chronology
| Word Power (1989) | Spiral Walls Containing Autumns of Light (1992) | Wordpower, Vol. 2: Directrix (1999) |

Spiral Walls Containing Autumns of Light is the second album by hip hop artist Divine Styler, released in 1992 on Giant Records. This album marked a significant change in Divine Styler's musical direction, incorporating a much broader range of styles and influences than 1989's Word Power. The album was a major-label release but, perhaps owing to its experimental nature, failed to meet sales expectations. Although largely regarded as a commercial failure, it has since developed a large cult following. Styler was signed to Giant because of Ice-T’s relationship with Warner Bros. Records.

== Album overview ==
=== Music ===
Spiral Walls takes influence from a wide variety of music genres such as hip hop, rock, electronic, funk and even elements of spoken word and noise. AllMusic referred to the album as being like '"the Residents meets Funkadelic".

The majority of the album was produced and arranged by Divine Styler himself, which included him performing and processing all of the vocals, playing the guitar, drums (and drum programming), and keyboards, among other instruments. Due to the artist's dominance over the album's direction, it is generally regarded as a very introspective and personal album.

=== Lyrics ===
Since Divine Styler was at the time a recent convert to Sunni Islam, lyrical themes of the album mainly focus around the teachings of Islam and praise of Muhammad, with various spoken word pieces demonstrating this.

== Critical reception ==
Professional ratings
Review scores
| Source | Rating |
|---|---|
| AllMusic | 4.5/5 stars |

Retrospective reviews of the album were generally positive, perhaps surprisingly considering the uncompromising nature of the music that the album presented. In his review of the album for AllMusic, Ned Raggett wrote,

Arguably the most undeservedly ignored hip hop release of the early ’90s, Spiral Walls is a mind-blowing, astonishing album that glitters like a dark jewel, equally nightmarish and astonishingly beautiful...Spiral Walls in the end is the album Prince could only wish to make in the ’90s—all-encompassing, spiritual, disturbing, and never, ever boring, a true lost classic.

== Significance ==
=== In Search of Divine Styler ===
In the spring of 1996, Ryan Somers, a.k.a. Fritz tha Cat, a teenager from London, Canada, started a magazine titled In Search of Divine Styler in order to bring the emcee back from retirement. Eight issues were published over three years, with the magazine growing from 100 copies of the first issue to 10,000-copy print runs that were distributed all across North America.

=== Later Divine Styler work ===
After the release of Spiral Walls, strangely, Divine Styler disappeared from the music scene for almost four years. However, he later returned with original Scheme Team member Cokni O'Dire on House of Pain's last album Truth Crushed to Earth Shall Rise Again, exhibiting a more traditional hip-hop style of lyricism similar to his work on Word Power.

== Track listing ==
1. "Am I an Epigram for Life?" (1:44)
2. "Touch" (5:24)
3. "In a World of U" (5:09)
4. "Love, Lies, and Lifetime's Cries" (4:10)
5. "Livery" (5:02)
6. "Grey Matter" (5:42)
7. "Heaven Don't Want Me, and Hell's Afraid I'll Take Over" (9:25)
8. "Mystic Sheep Drink Electric Tea" (5:14)
9. "Width in My Depth" (4:24)
10. "The Next" (6:14)
11. "Euphoric Rangers" (5:09)
12. "Walk of Exodus" (7:48)
13. "Aura" (3:16)

== Personnel ==
Music

- Divine Styler - Vocals, mixing, keyboards, guitar, rhythm guitar, percussion, drum programming
- Tony Guarderas - Bass guitar
- Kendu Jenkins - Drums, keyboards
- Jeff Phillips - Guitar, rhythm guitar
- Brian Foxworthy - Engineering, mixing
- Michal Frenke - Engineering
- Wally Traugott - Mastering

Album art

- Robin Lynch - Art direction and design
- Merlyn Rosenberg - Photography
- Mario Markus - Computer-generated images
- Benno Hess - Computer-generated images
