= Ari Handel =

American neuroscientist

- Born: Zürich, Switzerland
- Education: Harvard University, New York University
- Occupations: Screenwriter, film producer

Ari Handel is a Swiss-born American neuroscientist, film producer and writer. He is known for co-writing the films Noah and The Fountain with his Harvard Dunster House suitemate Darren Aronofsky and for producing these films along with four other films: The Wrestler, Black Swan, Mother!, and The Whale. He started co-writing the film Noah around 2003.

== Early life and career ==
Handel grew up in a Jewish family in Newton, Massachusetts. He was born in Zürich, Switzerland, while his father was studying abroad, but he only lived there for about a year. Handel had an internship for Nova at WGBH, the Boston PBS station. He has a PhD in neurobiology from New York University. Torn between science writing and science education, he eventually became a film writer in an attempt to become a better communicator of science.
