= Ulrika Spacek =

English alternative rock band

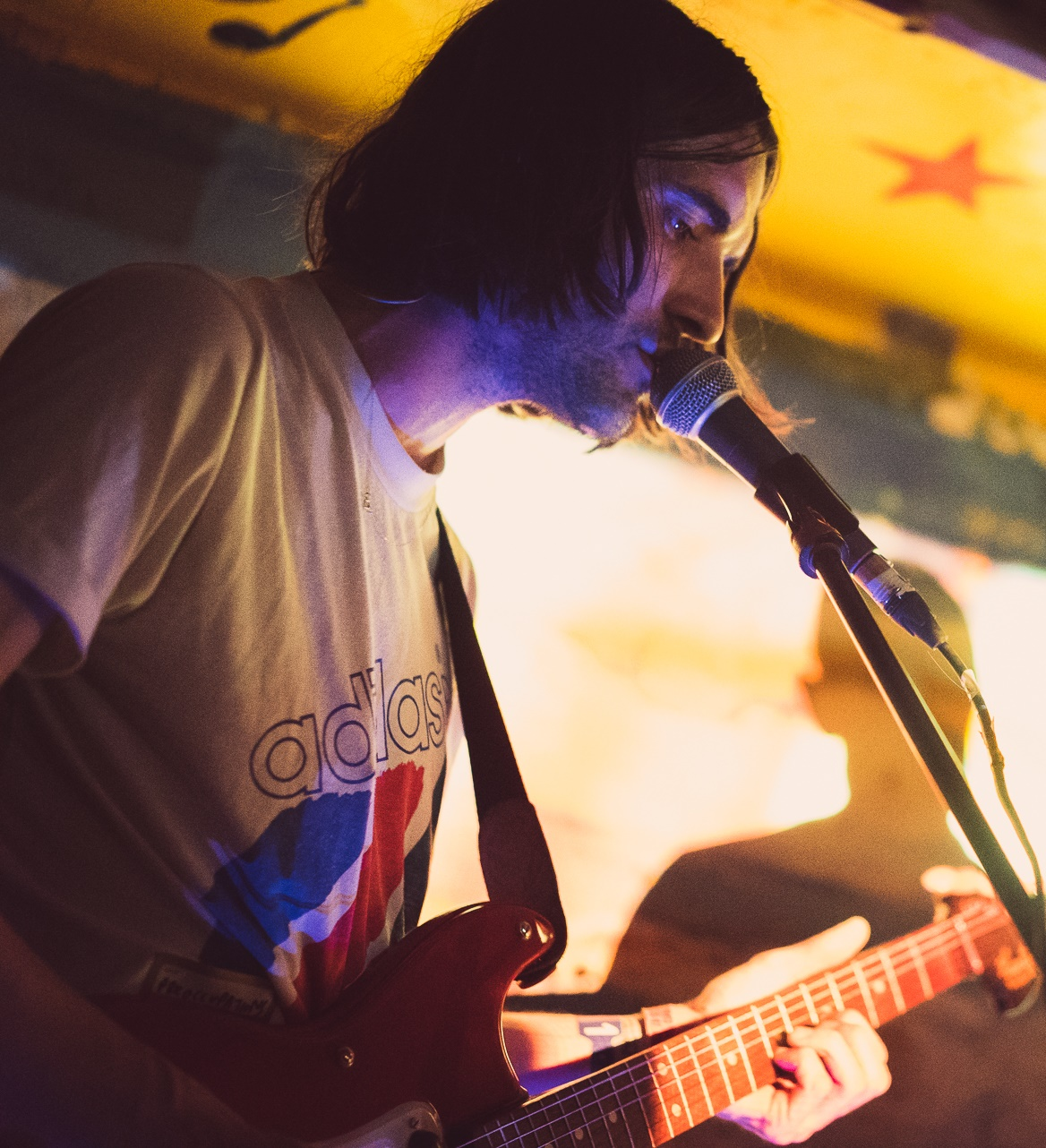
- Frontman Rhys Edwards on stage

Background information
- Origin: Reading, Berkshire, England
- Genres: Alternative rock, psychedelic rock, indie rock, shoegaze, post-rock, art rock
- Years active: 2014–present
- Label: Full Time Hobby
- Spinoff of: Tripwires
- Members: Rhys Edwards; Joseph Stone; Syd Kemp; Callum Brown; Rhys Jenkins
- Past members: Ben White; Rhys Williams; Adam Beach
- Website: www.ulrikaspacek.com

Ulrika Spacek are an English alternative rock band, formed in 2014 and currently composed of singer-guitarist Rhys Edwards, guitarist Rhys Jenkins, guitarist-keyboardist Joseph Stone, bassist Syd Kemp and drummer Callum Brown.

Edwards, Stone and White were previously members of Reading band Tripwires, with Williams having previously toured with the band as an additional guitarist and releasing material under the Viscous Liquid moniker.

== History ==
=== Previous projects, 2002–2014 ===
School friends Rhys Edwards, Joseph Stone, and Ben White have worked with each other in bands since 2002. The Enigma Project was formed in Reading, Berkshire in 2002 by Edwards, Sam Pillsbury, and George Simpson with White joining soon after. Simpson was replaced in 2005 by Joseph Stone. They signed to Automator Records and released their debut single "Astronaut/Microcosm" in July 2005, plus the follow-up EP "Scenes of the 21st Century".

In 2007, The Enigma Project changed its name to Tripwires and released the singles "Kings & Queens" and "Just So You Know" the following year. The songs were picked up by national radio and championed by the likes of Huw Stephens and Steve Lamacq. The same year the band performed on the BBC Introducing stage at Reading and Leeds Festivals. The band began work on their debut album 'Spacehopper' in August 2010, and was set for release in April 2011 via Club AC30. However, the album was scrapped and the band parted ways with the label. The band recorded a different version of the album in New York with producer Nicolas Vernhes, and it was eventually released in June 2013 via French Kiss Records. They self-released their second album Watermelancholia via Bandcamp in May 2015. The album was recorded in London and Berlin through 2013 and 2014.

=== Current lineup and signing to Tough Love Records, 2014–present ===
In Spring 2014, Edwards began working on new material in Berlin with Reading school friend and sometime Tripwires live guitarist Rhys Williams. On returning to England, they re-located to Homerton, East London where they completed the album at a shared house named KEN with drummer Callum Brown and fellow Tripwires members Joseph Stone and Ben White. The band made their live debut in London in May 2015. Soon after saw the formation of 'Oysterland', a self-curated night that combined the band's earliest live performances with a series of art exhibitions. They released The Album Paranoia in February 2016 and embarked on a UK tour the same month. In September 2016, the band released stand-alone single "Everything: All The Time".

The band released their second album Modern English Decoration in June 2017, which was preceded by the single "Mimi Pretend". Initial copies of the album on vinyl came with a bonus 7", which neglected to include a tracklisting. One of the tracks was later confirmed to be a cover version of a song by Parsley Sound entitled "Ease Yourself And Glide". Commenting on plans for forthcoming releases, frontman Rhys Edwards stated that "We will certainly be putting music out, it won't be a full length though. We see our first two albums as brother and sister records and think it will be nice to leave them both out there for a little while before we think about putting out another record".

In November 2022, the band returned to the live arena with a gig at Bermondsey Social Club, London. At the gig the band unveiled a new lineup of the band, with former Younghusband guitarist Adam Beach replacing the now departed Rhys Williams. They played 2 further gigs in January 2023 in Todmorden, West Yorkshire and London.

On 29 October 2025, Ulrika Spacek announced their new album EXPO, set for release on 6 February 2026 via independent London label Full Time Hobby.

== Band members ==
- Rhys Edwards – lead vocals, guitar
- Rhys Jenkins – guitar
- Joseph Stone – guitar, keyboard
- Syd Kemp - bass
- Callum Brown - drums

== Discography ==
=== Studio albums ===
- The Album Paranoia (February 2016), Tough Love Records
- Modern English Decoration (June 2017), Tough Love Records
- Compact Trauma (March 2023), Tough Love Records
- EXPO (February 2026), Full Time Hobby

=== EPs ===
- Suggestive Listening (April 2018), Tough Love Records

=== Singles ===
- "Everything: All The Time" (September 2016), Tough Love Records
