= Instrumentalyst (Octagon Beats) =

Remix album by Dr. Octagon
- Released: December 9, 1996
- Recorded: 1995–1996
- Genre: Instrumental hip hop
- Length: 54:58 (UK/EU release)/72:02
- Label: Mo'Wax/DreamWorks
- Producer: Dan the Automator, KutMasta Kurt ("Technical Difficulties", "Dr. Octagon")

Kool Keith chronology
Instrumentalyst (Octagon Beats) (1996)	The Lost Masters (2003)

Instrumentalyst (Octagon Beats) is a remix album by American emcee Keith Thornton, credited under the title Dr. Octagon. Released in 1996, it is the instrumental version of Dr. Octagonecologyst. It is Thornton's second album under the Dr. Octagon alias. Instrumentalyst (Octagon Beats) was produced by Dan "The Automator" Nakamura and featured the work of turntablist DJ Qbert. KutMasta Kurt provided additional production work. The artwork was drawn by Brian "Pushead" Schroeder.

== Music ==
Following the release of his group's third album The Four Horsemen (1993), Ultramagnetic MCs member Keith Thornton, better known by his stage name Kool Keith, produced two songs under the alias Dr. Octagon, "Dr. Octagon" and "Technical Difficulties." Thornton mailed the songs to radio stations as well as giving copies to several DJs and record producer Dan "The Automator" Nakamura. This led to Dan the Automator's role in producing the album.

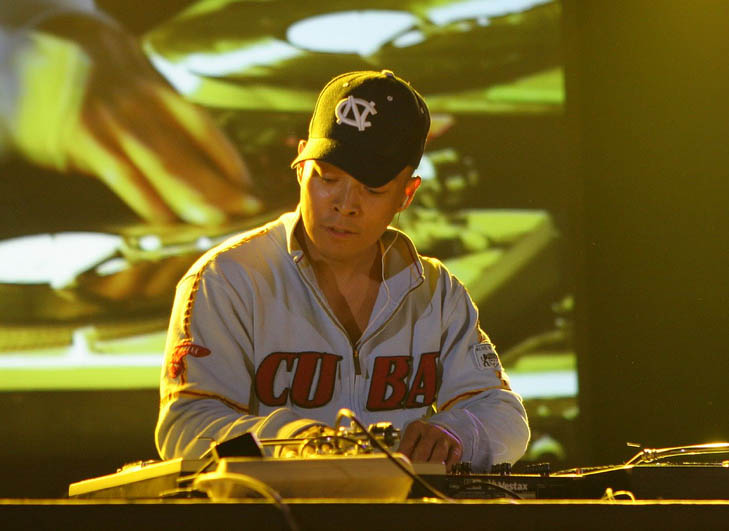
DJ Qbert contributed largely to the album's production with his innovative scratching.

Dr. Octagonecologyst has been praised for its original sound, which has often been attributed to Nakamura, although Thornton states that he was largely involved with the production of the album. Thornton is quoted as saying "Automator and Kurt are probably receiving more credit than I did, but I was a big musical person behind Octagon." Nakamura has said he wanted Dr. Octagonecologyst to stand out from other hip hop albums, citing the music of Eric B. & Rakim, Mantronix, and Run-D.M.C. as influences. "Hip-hop was always inventive. Then the '90s hit and everyone wants to be Dr. Dre; no one wants to be their own thing anymore. Everyone now wants to have the Lexus and deal pounds of drugs. We don't do that. That's not our lifestyle. You don't see us coming out with the fur coat. There's more to music than that," Nakamura said. The album incorporates use of organic instrumentation and features Moog synthesizer, flute, and string instruments.

Lily Moayeri of Rolling Stone called the album a "psychedelic hip-hop concept album." Allmusic reviewer Steve Huey wrote that the album "shed some light on the burgeoning turntablist revival via the scratching fireworks of DJ Q-Bert" and its "futuristic, horror-soundtrack production seemed to bridge the gap between hip-hop and the more electronic-oriented trip-hop". Steve "Flash" Juon of RapReviews also praised its sound, writing that "Cuts are provided with infinite skill and precision by DJ Q-Bert" and that Nakamura's remix of "Waiting List" is "so good that you could hardly miss the original, if indeed there was one."

== Reception ==
Professional ratings
Review scores
Source	Rating
Allmusic	3/5 stars
Muzik	3/5 stars

Allmusic reviewer Kembrew McLeod wrote that "If any other artist released an album such as this, it would be considered throwaway trash—something for the hardcore fans. But Dan the Automator's backing tracks are so fresh and original, it's actually nice to just hear the beats minus the rhymes." According to Zac Crain of the Miami New Times, Instrumentalyst proved that Dan "the Automator" Nakamura "had as much, if not more, to do with the success of Dr. Octagon as anyone else."

== Track listing ==
No.	Title	Writer(s)	Producer(s)	Length
1.	"3000"	Nakamura	Dan the Automator	3:31
2.	"Moosebumps"	Nakamura	Dan the Automator	1:47
3.	"Earth People"	Nakamura	Dan the Automator	4:49
4.	"Real Raw*"	Nakamura	Dan the Automator	5:34
5.	"No Awareness"	Nakamura	Dan the Automator	4:45
6.	"Blue Flowers"	Nakamura	Dan the Automator	3:16
7.	"Technical Difficulties (remix, original version featured on the UK/EU release)"	Matlin	KutMasta Kurt	2:57
8.	"A Visit to the Gynecologyst (listed as "Catapillar" on the UK/EU release)"	Nakamura	Dan the Automator	3:37
9.	"Bear Witness (Extended Version)*"	Nakamura	Dan the Automator	6:45
10.	"Dr. Octagon"	Matlin	KutMasta Kurt	4:35
11.	"Girl Let Me Touch You"	Nakamura	Dan the Automator	4:21
12.	"I'm Destructive"	Nakamura	Dan the Automator	3:17
13.	"Tricknology 101"	Nakamura	Dan the Automator	4:58
14.	"Wild and Crazy"	Nakamura	Dan the Automator	4:31
15.	"Blue Flowers Revisited*"	Nakamura	Dan the Automator	4:38
16.	"Waiting List"	Nakamura	Dan the Automator	5:31
17.	"On Production"	Nakamura	Dan the Automator	3:01
Total length:				72:00

- = not featured on UK/EU release

UK/EU tracklist: 6, 11, 1, 2, 13, 12, 5, 16, 17, 7, 8, 14, 3, 10

== Personnel ==
Information taken from Allmusic.

=== Musicians ===
- Andy Boy — guitar
- Phil Bright — bass, guitar
- C-Note — vox organ
- DJ Q-Bert — scratching, DJ
- Whoolio E. Glacias — vox organ
- Sweet-P — vox organ

=== Additional personnel ===
- Dan the Automator — producer, mixing, mastering
- Gordon Chumway — second engineer
- Pushead — illustrations
- Mark Senasac — mastering
