= Parsley Sound =

English psychedelic pop duo

- Also known as: Slum; The Shelton Street Orchestra
- Origin: Camden Town, London, England
- Genres: Psychedelic pop
- Years active: 1999–present
- Labels: Mo' Wax; Warp; Destructible; Beggars Group
- Members: Danny Sargassa; Preston Mead

Parsley Sound is an English psychedelic pop duo formed in London in 1999 and consisting of musicians Danny Sargassa and Preston Mead. Their debut studio album Parsley Sounds (2003) was released on Mo' Wax. Their lo-fi music combines influences from music of the 1960s, electronic, and contemporary folk.

== History ==
Danny Sargassa and Preston Mead met in 1991 at a squat party in Camden Town and began collaborating on music in 1995. Prior to the two meeting, Sargassa was the saxophonist in a reggae band called Crucial Recruit starting at age 12 and later worked as a session musician, including for 808 State, Goldie, and Clyde Stubblefield, while Mead played bass in various bands throughout the 1980s and later worked on records with Jah Warrior's Steve Mosco and Heidi Berry.

Sargassa and Mead formed the duo Slum and, after their friend Leila showed their song "Twilight Mushrooms" to Warp Records, the label released the song as the duo's debut single in 1999. They soon changed their name to Parsley Sound, based on a cat named Parsley who had lived in their old recording studio, and released their first single under the new name, "Ease Yourself and Glide", in September 2001. NME named the song their single of the week and complimented it as a "killer debut". They signed to James Lavelle's record label Mo' Wax in 2002 and released their third single "Platonic Rate" later that year, which preceded their debut studio album, Parsley Sounds, on 8 September 2003. The album was well-received by critics; Pitchfork gave it a score of 8.8 out of ten, with Hartley Goldstein praising it for the publication as "one of those rare records that manage to sound modest while frequently pushing the sonic envelope", while laut.de and AllMusic also reviewed it positively.

The duo released two singles through the newly-founded label Destructible: "7Hz Love" featuring Amala PL was released in October 2005 and received moderate critical praise and "Astral Telephone" followed in January 2007. By 2009, Nigel Pulsford, formerly the guitarist for Bush, had begun performing with Parsley Sound. Following a period of silence from the band, they independently released their second album, Picnic on Mars, on 11 April 2013. In 2022, they released the instrumental album The Lockdown Locomotive, recorded during the COVID-19 lockdowns, under the name the Shelton Street Orchestra.

== Musical style ==
Parsley Sound's music has been described as psychedelic pop. Their first album was recorded using a combination of multitrack recording with Logic. In a review of their debut album, Uncut described their songs as "somnambulistic folk shanties" featuring "spliffed-out beeps and blips" which "drift in a melodic haze of wistful innocence". Kenyon Hopkin of AllMusic called their music "soft, warm pop cushioned by downbeat electronic". For Les Inrockuptibles, Christophe Conte likened their music to that of both Kevin Ayers and the band Air. Goldstein wrote that their music drew from "disparate genres" including "lo-fi folk", beat music, and 1960s psychedelia, deeming them the "vibrant lovechild" of the bands Badly Drawn Boy, the Beta Band, and Super Furry Animals. Aaron Powell of The Line of Best Fit retrospectively described their music in 2017 as a blend of "'90s benchmark indie" and "'60s noodling". The duo have been described as enigmatic.

== Legacy ==
The band Ulrika Spacek released a cover of Parsley Sound's song "Ease Yourself and Glide" in August 2017 and the band Real Estate performed a cover of the Parsley Sound song "Ocean House" for Aquarium Drunkard's Lagniappe Sessions series in 2021. Finn Wolfhard stated in 2021 that Parsley Sound had been an influence on the lo-fi sound of his band the Aubreys, while Kevin Krauter described Parsley Sound in 2025 as an inspiration for his work with Wishy. Also in 2025, Darran Anderson wrote for The Quietus that Parsley Sound were part of "an entire underbelly" of artists that sounded like the Beta Band, which also included Jim Noir, Scott 4 and Magic Car, Bitmap, and Jape.

== Discography ==
=== Studio albums ===
List of studio albums with selected details
Title	Details
Parsley Sounds	Released: 8 September 2003; Label: Mo' Wax, Beggars Group; Format: LP, CD
Picnic on Mars	Released: 11 April 2013; Label: Self-released; Format: Digital download, streaming

=== Singles ===
List of singles, showing year released and album title
Title	Year	Album
"Twilight Mushrooms"	1999	Parsley Sounds
"Ease Yourself and Glide"	2001	Parsley Sounds
"Platonic Rate"	2002	Parsley Sounds
"7Hz Love" (featuring Amala PL)	2005	Non-album singles
"Astral Telephone"	2007	Non-album singles
