= Divine Styler =

American rapper

- Born: Marc Richardson; 1968 (age 57–58)
- Origin: Brooklyn, New York, U.S.
- Genres: Alternative hip hop; experimental hip hop; outsider music
- Years active: 1988–present
- Labels: Rhyme $yndicate; Epic; Giant; DTX Recordings; Gamma Proforma

Mikal Safeyullah (born Marc Richardson; 1968), better known by his stage name Divine Styler, is an alternative hip hop artist.

== History ==
He first emerged as part of Ice-T's Rhyme Syndicate. His first LP, Word Power, was hailed by critics and fans, but was not a commercial success. His second album, the wildly experimental Spiral Walls Containing Autumns of Light, also failed to sell well. In 1998, Divine Styler hooked up with the Quannum Records crew, teaming up with his dear friend and fellow Rhyme Syndicate alumni Everlast, Styles of Beyond, and the Beat Junkies. The latter also appeared on his third LP, Wordpower, Vol. 2: Directrix (Featuring Exceed), which trafficked in information-age paranoia. Although he did not bask in much commercial success he is a well respected factor from the early 1990s West Coast Underground scene. His poetical approach and unorthodox dance crew "The Scheme Team" influenced the likes of Abstract Rude Tribe Unique (ATU). Although there is not much footage of Divine Styler and the Scheme Team he did make a live appearance on Rapmania, an historic 1989 televised concert that included almost every active Hip Hop artist of that year. Divine performed "Tongue of Labyrinth" an abstract rhyme style accompanied with the wild dance style of the Scheme Team was a great audio visual performance that captured the essence of Divine Styler.

Divine Styler is a convert to Islam; he influenced the decision of Everlast to become a Muslim. Many of the songs on Spiral Walls Containing Autums of Light are songs of praise to Allah, and the 1999 song "Make it Plain" (recorded for the Funky Precedent compilation) details the joy he feels at having finally found a way of life he loves after decades of uncertainty and woes.

Aside from those major albums his tracks are scattered among other artists' albums and projects. He has done several tracks with John Tejada but they're scattered on several compilations and albums by Tejada. He appeared (along with Sadat X and Cockni O'Dire) on several tracks on the final House of Pain album Truth Crushed to Earth Shall Rise Again. His most recent work has been with Len, Swollen Members, and DJ Shadow, as well as with guitarist, bassist, and emcee Gabe Rosales.

== Discography ==
Albums

- Word Power (1989, Rhyme $yndicate)
- Spiral Walls Containing Autumns of Light (1992, Giant)
- Word Power, Vol. 2: Directrix (1999, DTX Recordings)
- Def Mask (2014, Gamma Proforma)

EPs

- Ain't Saying Nothing (1988)

Mixtapes

- Warporn (w/ Everlast & Sick Jacken) (2017, Datpiff)

Singles

- "Architectonic" (2014, Gamma Proforma)

Appears on

- Rap De Rap Show De La Soul Is Dead (1991)
- Truth Crushed to Earth Shall Rise Again (1996)
- Strength Magazine Presents Subtext (1999)
- The Funky Precedent (1999)
- Hell's Kitchen (2000)
- Razor Tag (2007)
- Reseda Beach (2012)
