= Mo' Wax =

Defunct English record label

- Parent company: Island Records (majority of catalogue)
- Founded: 1992
- Founder: James Lavelle
- Status: Inactive
- Distributor: PIAS Group
- Country of origin: United Kingdom

Mo' Wax was a British record label founded by James Lavelle in 1992. The label was not co-founded by Tim Goldsworthy, as is often reported. Steve Finan became co-owner shortly after.

Mo' Wax came to recognition for being at the forefront of trip hop, turntablism and alternative hip hop during the mid-1990s. The label also released notable records covering techno, drum and bass and electro. Mo' Wax also helped the graffiti artist Futura 2000 regain popularity, by using his artwork on many of their releases in the 1990s.

Lavelle signed partial ownership of Mo' Wax over to A&M Records (now part of the Universal Music Group) in 1996. When their deal expired he signed with Beggars Group, who still own some of the catalogue.

The name derives from "Mo'Wax Please", the title of a column James Lavelle wrote in the magazine Straight No Chaser and the Oxford club night he ran. This in turn was influenced by the Freddie Roach LP, Mo' Greens Please on Blue Note records.

The original Mo' Wax logo as used on the early releases was designed by UK graphic designer Ian Swift "Swifty" and the label grew their reputation by featuring artwork contributions from Futura, Robert Del Naja (from Massive Attack), She One, Req1 and Kostas Seremetis. Ben Drury and Will Bankhead were the main designers responsible for the art direction and design of the label.

The label also released toys and art prints under their Mo' Wax Arts (MWA) imprint, and collaborated with artists such as Mark Gonzales, Mike Mills, and Money Mark.

The label shut in 2002 and was celebrated in 2014 with an exhibition titled "Urban Archaeology: 21 years of Mo' Wax".

In 2015, Lavelle licensed back the Mo' Wax label to release Elliott Power's "Murmur" single as a limited edition hand stamped 12" vinyl. On 26 February 2016, Elliott Power's debut album, Once Smitten, was released on Mo' Wax in collaboration with Marathon Artists. This is the label's most recent release.

== Discography ==
- MW 001 Repercussions – Promise
- MW 002 Raw Stylus – Many Ways (12")
- MW 003 Palm Skin Productions – Getting Out Of Hell (12")
- MW 004 Marden Hill – Come On (12")
- MW 005 RPM – Food of My De-Rhythm (12")
- MW 006 The Federation – Life So Free (12")
- MW 007 Mistura – Coast to Coast (12")
- MW 008 Bubbatunes – This Is Just A Dance (12")
- MW 009 Palm Skin Productions – Time & Space EP (12")
- MW 010 V.A. – Jazz Hip Jap Project
- MW 011 El Malo – Mighty & Solution (12")
- MW 012 DJ Takemura – Hoping for the Sun (12")
- MW 013 Palm Skin Productions – In A Silent Way (12")
- MW 014 DJ Shadow – In Flux
- MW 015 The Federation – Remix E.P. (12")
- MW 016 Step – If (12")
- MW 017 La Funk Mob – Tribulations Extra Sensorielles
- MW 018 RPM – 2000 / Sortie Des Ombres
- MW 019 Dee C. Lee – New Reality Vibes (12")
- MW 020 Attica Blues – Vibes, Scribes 'n' Dusty 45's E.P.
- MW 021 Deep Joy – Make Some Sense Of This (12")
- MW 022 Visionistics – Mysterious Ways (12")
- MW 023 La Funk Mob – Casse Les Frontieres, Fou Les Tetes em L'Air (2 x 10")
- MW 024 DJ Shadow / DJ Krush – Lost And Found (S.F.L) / Kemuri (12")
- MW 025 DJ Krush – Strictly Turntablized
- MW 026 V.A. – Headz
- MW 027 DJ Shadow – What Does Your Soul Look Like
- MW 028 U.N.K.L.E – The Time Has Come E.P.
- MW 029 Palm Skin Productions – The Beast
- MW 030 (no official release)
- MW 031 Sam Sever & The Raiders of the Lost Art – What's That Sound?
- MW 032 Money Mark – Insects Are All Around Us
- MW 033 DJ Krush – A Whim
- MW 034 Money Mark – Mark's Keyboard Repair
- MW 035 Luke Vibert – A Polished Solid
- MW 036 Money Mark – Cry
- MW 037 Rob Dougan – Clubbed to Death
- MW 038 Attica Blues – Blueprint
- MW 039 DJ Krush – Meiso (LP)
- MW 040 Andrea Parker – Melodius Thunk
- MW 041 (no official release)
- MW 042 DJ Krush – Meiso (Single)
- MW 043 Money Mark – Third Version E.P.
- MW 044 Money Mark – Legitimate Pop Songs?
- MW 045 Andrea Parker – Rocking Chair
- MW 046 Dr Octagon – Dr. Octagonecologyst
- MW 047 Air – Modular
- MW 048 (no official release)
- MW 049 Innerzone Orchestra – Bug in the Bassbin
- MW 050 (Sam Sever – Zone Alone – Unreleased Test Pressing)
- MW 051 Innervisions – Mermaids
- MW 052 V.A. – Headz 2 Sampler
- MW 053 V.A. – Headz 2 Sampler
- MW 054 V.A. – Headz 2 Sampler
- MW 055 Dr Octagon – Blue Flowers
- MW 056 V.A. – Excursions
- MW 057 DJ Shadow – Midnight in a Perfect World
- MW 058 DJ Shadow – Stem
- MW 059 DJ Shadow – Endtroducing.....
- MW 060 DJ Krush – Only The Strong Survive
- MW 061 V.A. – Headz 2A
- MW 062 V.A. – Headz 2B
- MW 063 DJ Shadow – High Noon
- MW 064 Dr Octagon – Instrumentalyst (Octagon Beats)
- MW 065 Urban Tribe – Eastward
- MW 066 Money Mark – Hand in Your Head
- MW 067 Attica Blues – Tender
- MW 068 Dr Octagon – 3000
- MW 069 UNKLE – Berry Meditation
- MW 070 UNKLE – Rock On (12" – One Sided Promo)
- MW 071 Luke Vibert – Do Unto Others
- MW 072 Luke Vibert – Big Soup
- MW 073 Sukia – Contacto Espacial Con El Tercer Sexo
- MW 074 (no official release)
- MW 077 DJ Krush – MiLight
- MW 078 Liquid Liquid – Liquid Liquid
- MW 080 Attica Blues – Attica Blues
- MW 082 V.A. – The Original Artform
- MW 085 UNKLE – Psyence Fiction
- MW 088 DJ Krush – Holonic-The Self Megamix
- MW 090 Money Mark – Push The Button
- MW 099 Andrea Parker – Kiss My Arp
- MW 101 V.A. – Time Machine (mixed by Psychonauts)
- MW 102 Urban Tribe – The Collapse of Modern Culture
- MW 104 Tommy Guerrero – A Little Bit of Somethin'
- MW 105 Major Force West – 93–97
- MW 110 V.A. – Quannum Spectrum
- MW 112 Blackalicious – Nia
- MW 115 DJ Assault – Belle Isle Tech
- MW 121 DJ Magic Mike – The Journey (Era of Bass Part 1)
- MW 122 Divine Styler – Wordpower, Vol. 2: Directrix
- MW 129 Nigo – Ape Sounds
- MW 132 South – From Here on In
- MW 141 David Axelrod – David Axelrod
- MW 143 Malcom Catto – Popcorn Bubble Fish
- MW 145 V.A. – Now Thing
- MW 152 Malcom Catto – Bubblefish Breaks
- MW 155 Jordan Fields – Moments in Dub
- MW 158 Tommy Guerrero – Soul Food Taqueria
- MW 159 Parsley Sound – Parsley Sounds
- MWU 001 UNKLE – Never, Never, Land

MWLP Prefix – Only 3 catalogue numbers were released on the LP prefix before the label started to include LP's in the main MW prefix. Also available as CD with prefix MWCD..

- MWLP 001 V.A. – Jazz Hip Jazz
- MWLP 002 The Federation – Flower to the Sun
- MWLP 003 V.A. – Royalties Overdue
