= Kostas Seremetis =

American painter, sculptor and filmmaker (born 1972)

Kostas Seremetis (born December 7, 1972, in Boston, Massachusetts) is an American painter, sculptor and filmmaker. He is the son of Greek immigrants from the Laconia region in Greece (Krokeaí, Sparta).

Seremetis is highly influenced by comic book art, animation cartoons, graffiti art of the 1980s, Greek mythology and contemporary masters. He is known for using the comic book popular pulp characters as typography in order to express a visual language in media such as paintings, collage, sculptures and films. By the time he was 30, he had established a large international following, by exhibiting his art worldwide mainly in Tokyo, New York, Berlin and Paris.

== Art ==
Seremetis started exhibiting at the age of 19 in Boston. He moved to New York in 1996. In 1994, he was commissioned by the Warner Bros. Studio Store, where he had three sold-out exhibitions.

In 2005, he participated in "Street Urchins", curated by Ronnie Cutrone in Casola Gallery in Peekskill, New York.

In 2006, he was commissioned by the director Darren Aronofsky among ten other artists to review The Fountain, a commission that was published in the New York Times.

His work was shown in the Parco Museum in Tokyo for a solo exhibition Superhero and six, the Triennale Museum, Milan, and Museum of the City of Mexico, and is in private collections worldwide.

In 2008, he showed in the exhibition "Lo Hi", a group exhibition of artists like Gerhard Richter and Jean-Michel Basquiat at Takashi Murakami's Kaikai Kiki Gallery in Tokyo, Japan. In 2011, he participated in "Kindergarten", an exhibition curated by Giorgio de Mitri, in the 17th century Palazzina dei Giardini in Modena, Italy, with other international artists including Futura 2000, Mode2, Os Gêmeos, Tom Sachs and Boris Tellegen (aka Delta).

He had a solo exhibition in Mexico City in 2011, "Human Kind" at the Anonymous Gallery, and participated in a group show in 2009 with Ronnie Cutrone, Rammellzee and Rostarr.

Seremetis was selected by Spotify to create a large scale mural its new New York City Spotify office. He created a large Spider-Man painting. He has also had a few collaborations with the clothing company Stüssy.

Seremetis contributed to the comic book artist Paul Pope's Escapo, published summer 2014.

== Films ==
He has worked on films, using footage from popular movies by creating split screen films. In his Star Wars trilogy, which was shown in the Sydney underground film festival in 2011, Seremetis edited this 126-minute film, taking the left third of Star Wars, the middle third of Empire Strikes Back and the right third of Return of the Jedi, synchronizing them into one film.

He was invited to give a master class in Tangier, Morocco, showcasing the film. Seremetis contributed art projected in various scenes in Traitors, a film written and directed by Sean Gullette, screened at the Tribeca Film Festival in April 2014.

== Collaborations with musicians ==
Seremetis's film, The Resistance, opened for the band The Cult at Irving Plaza in New York in 2007. He also designed the stage backdrop for the world tour, "Born into This". Later, he designed the album cover for Born into This. In 2012 he directed the Cult's "Elemental Light" video.

For his recent tour, Seremetis created guitar picks for John Mayer

On March 3, 2014, the New York-based rapper A$AP Rocky released a music video on YouTube titled "Riot Rave", co-directed with Seremetis, from Rocky's instrumental only album. Seremetis created the artwork and the video's packaging
