= DJ Garth =

British DJ (born 1967)

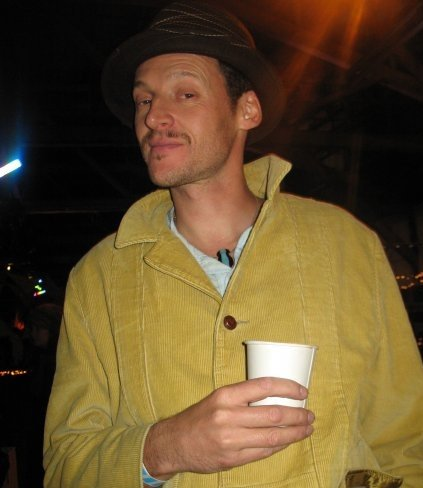

Background information
- Also known as: Garth Hound
- Born: Garth Wynne-Jones; 1967 (age 58–59); England
- Genres: House, disco, acid rock
- Occupations: DJ, musician, producer
- Years active: 1990–present
- Labels: Golden Goose edits, Grayhound, Wicked

DJ Garth is a British house music DJ and recording artist who has been credited with both defining and capturing the sound of San Francisco house music in the 1990s. He co-founded the Wicked Sound System and established a series of underground parties which were important in putting San Francisco on the club/rave map.

== Biography ==
Born and raised in England, Garth moved to San Francisco in 1990 and became a key player in the city's dance scene. In 1991 along with friends and fellow DJs Jenö, Thomas Bullock and Markie, he founded the Wicked Sound System, and organised the monthly Full Moon events that led to increased underground interest in rave culture. By 1994 the crew imported a custom Tony Andrews-designed Turbosound system, teaming up with a 1947 Greyhound bus which allowed the Wicked act to tour the States.

This annual tour along with early appearances at Burning Man and Reggae on the River Festivals gave Garth the inspiration to produce his own music. Wicked Records' first (and most successful) release was DJ Garth's 1996 collaboration with E.T.I., "20 Minutes of Disco Glory," which remains a popular House track. It was featured in the soundtrack for the movie Groove.

In 1998, Garth founded his own label Grayhound Recordings, named after the Wicked tour bus. Grayhound became the home label for his own projects including singles with Markie and as Rocket with Eric James. The label went on to release 54 singles from California recording artists including DJ Garth & E.T.I., Rocket, Defenders of the Faith, Wicked, Mirror Boys, DJ Harvey, Nectar, Stranger, Rasoul, EBE & Michoacan.

1998 proved to be a milestone year, with the release of Thrive's popular mix CD U.S. Underground, Vol. 1. 2000 saw the release of The Cisco System, a Garth mix CD showcasing the work of Grayhound artists. This was the first of three Grayhound mixes, the others being Revolutions in Sound & Unleash the Hound. In 2001, Om released San Francisco Sessions Vol. 3, showcasing his blend of House and Dub. In 2003, UK label NRK released Garth's Nitelife Vol 7.

Garth has remixed A Tribe Called Quest, Jane's Addiction frontman Perry Farrell, Faithless, Yabby You, The Units, The Glimmers, DadaMunchamonkey, Adam Freeland, Strafe and many others.

In 2007 he launched Golden Goose re-edits with James Glass to release their own King & Hound edits. The purpose of the label lies in reviving forgotten Disco and Synth Rock tracks.

Moving to Los Angeles in 2011 made his big screen debut as an actor (credited as Garth Wynne-Jones) in the feature film Speed Dragon which premiered at Cannes Film Festival and won Best Feature at NY Independent Film Festival. He has built up many on-camera and voice-over credits in film since and maintains a busy tour schedule DJing around the world. In 2010 he toured extensively in Japan & Australia with DJ Harvey.

== Full discography ==
Original singles
Dj Garth & ETI – 20 Minutes Of Disco Glory (Wicked 1996)
Crosstown Traffic – Now Dig This (Wicked 1997)
Crosstown Traffic – Understand (Wicked 1997)
Rocket – Between The Lines (Grayhound 1998)
Crosstown Traffic – Open Sesame (Grayhound 1998)
Dj Garth & ETI – Twenty Minutes Of Disco Glory Remixes (Grayhound 1998)
Rocket – Cisco System (Grayhound 1998)
Crosstown Traffic – Twilight Trilogy (Grayhound 1999)
Rocket – People Ep (Grayhound 1999)
Rocket – Serpent Fire (Grayhound 2000)
Rocket – Standby (Worship 1999)
Rocket – Voices Of Freedom (Grayhound 2000)
Rocket – People Remixes (Grayhound 2000)
Rocket – Revolution Ep (Grayhound 2001)
Rocket – EZ EP (Grayhound 2002)
Rocket – Out With The Tide Remixes (Grayhound 2002)
DJ Garth Markie Mark – Anthem #1 (Grayhound 2002)
Rocket – People W/rob Mello Remix (NRK 2002)
DJ Garth & ETI – 20 Minutes Of Disco Glory Wicked Remixes Pt1 & 2 (Grayhound 2003)
DJ Garth & Markie Mark – The Price (Grayhound 2003)
Rocket – People with Chicken Lips Remix (Nrk 2003)
Rocket Vs Peretz – 2 Souls Alone (Grayhound 2005)
Garth & MRK Featuring Sage – 7 Days without Kyan (Om, Reboot 2005)
Garth & Anthony Mansfield – Pancho's Revenge (Hector Works 2011)
DJ Garth – Set It Off Tribute Mix Featuring Strafe (Wicked 2017)
Garth & Anthony Mansfield – Hospital Corners/Room Service (Wicked 2019)

Remixes
Jacob London – Hydrogenated Funk, Garth Remix (Eat Knowledge 1998)
Rob Paine – Never Can Say Goodbye, Rocket Remix (Grayhound 1999)
A Tribe Called Quest – Get A Hold, Rocket Remix (Jive Electro 2000)
Dadamuncha Monkey – The Operator, Rocket Remix (Exist Dance 2000)
Kenneth Graham – Nothing To Prove, Rocket Remix (Terraform 2000)
Eric Spire & B. McCarthy – Untouchable, Rocket Remix (Silver Pearl 2000)
Jason Blakemore – Echo Echo, Rocket Remix (Life 2000)
Animated – Container #2, Rocket Remix (Deviant 2001)
Perry Farrell – Seeds, Rocket Remix (Virgin 2001)
Faithless – We Come One, Jenö/Garth/Eric James Remix (Cheeky 2001)
Nick Holder – Love Em, Leave Em, Rocket Remix (NRK 2001)
Yabby You – King Pharoah's Plague, DJ Garth & Markie Mark Remix (Twisted Roots 2003)
Rob Rives – Standing Alone, DJ Garth & Markie Mark Remix (Honchos 2003)
Mutubaruka – Time Unlimited, DJ Garth & Markie Mark Remix (Eq 2004)
The Glimmers – Ape or Not?, DJ Garth Remix (Diskimo 2007)
Halo Varga – Future, DJ Garth & Anthony Mansfield Remix (Siesta 2011)
Freeland – Silent Speaking, DJ Garth & Anthony Mansfield Remix (Marine Parade 2011)

Re-edits
King & Hound – Stranger in the City/Midnight Girl (Golden Goose 2007)
King & Hound – Wessen Das?/Kundalini (Golden Goose 2007)
King & Hound – Burnin' Up/High Pressure Days (Golden Goose 2007)
King & Hound – Life in Tokyo/Twice as Nice (Golden Goose 2008)
King & Hound – Golden Tears/The Horseman (Golden Goose 2009)
King & Hound – A Spectacle/Elements of Vogue (Golden Goose 2010)
King & Hound – Love Buzz/Can't Get Enough (Golden Goose 2010)
King & Hound – Tubular Bells/My Time Your Time (Golden Goose 2011

CDs
Garth – No Rest for the Wicked (Twitch 1993)
Garth – The Black Album (Deleted 1996)
Garth – Live on Haight (Housewares 1997)
Garth – US Underground Vol 1 (Thrive 1998)
Garth – The Cisco System (Grayhound 2000)
Garth – San Francisco Sessions 3 (Om 2000)
Garth – Nite Life 007 (Nrk 2001)
Garth – Revolutions in Sound (Grayhound 2003)
Garth – Sound of Life #12 (Japan Only 2004)
Garth – Unleash the Hound (Grayhound 2006)
