= Efrem Smith =

American pastor

Efrem Smith is an American pastor who is the co-pastor of Midtown Church and co-owner of Influential LLC. Smith has spoken on the subjects of leadership, multi-ethnic issues and development of the Christian community. Smith advocates for urban ministry and reaching out to the marginalized.

== Education ==
Smith graduated from Saint John's University, Luther Theological Seminary, and a DMin from Fuller Theological Seminary.

== Career ==
Smith has served as the founding pastor of The Sanctuary Covenant Church and is involved in community foundations as he was formerly the president of the Sanctuary Community Development Corporation in Minneapolis, Minnesota and the superintendent of the Pacific Southwest Conference of the Evangelical Covenant Church. In 1993 Smith was ordained by the National Baptist Convention. Currently, Smith serves as the president and CEO of World Impact as his full-time ministry and is an itinerant speaker for Forge: Kingdom Building Ministries.

== Speaking engagements ==
As a motivational speaker with Kingdom Building Ministries, Smith has been a keynote speaker for Together LA, the Urban Youth Worker's Institute Convention, Flavor Fest, Willow Creek Association Leadership Summit and Exponential Conferences.

== Books ==
- Raising Up Young Heroes ISBN 978-0-8308-3209-5
- The Hip-Hop Church ISBN 978-0-8308-3329-0
- Jump ISBN 978-1-4347-6457-7
- The Post-Black and Post-White Church ISBN 978-1-118-03658-7
- Hip-Hop as Culture

== Personal life ==
Smith lives in the Bay area with his wife Donecia and two daughters.
