= The Fountain =

2006 American film by Darren Aronofsky

- Theatrical release poster
- Directed by: Darren Aronofsky
- Screenplay by: Darren Aronofsky
- Story by: Darren Aronofsky; Ari Handel
- Produced by: Arnon Milchan; Iain Smith; Eric Watson
- Starring: Hugh Jackman; Rachel Weisz; Ellen Burstyn
- Cinematography: Matthew Libatique
- Edited by: Jay Rabinowitz
- Music by: Clint Mansell
- Production companies: Warner Bros. Pictures; Regency Enterprises; New Regency; Protozoa Pictures; Foy, Inc.
- Distributed by: Warner Bros. Pictures (United States and Canada); 20th Century Fox (International)^{[i]}
- Release date: November 22, 2006
- Running time: 93 minutes
- Country: United States
- Language: English
- Budget: $35 million
- Box office: $16.5 million

The Fountain is a 2006 American epic science fiction romantic drama film written and directed by Darren Aronofsky and starring Hugh Jackman and Rachel Weisz. Blending elements of fantasy, history, spirituality, and science fiction, the film consists of three storylines involving immortality and the resulting loves lost, and one man's pursuit of avoiding this fate in this life or beyond it. Jackman and Weisz play sets of characters bonded by love across time and space: a conquistador and his ill-fated queen, a modern-day scientist and his cancer-stricken wife, and a traveler immersed in a universal journey alongside aspects of his lost love. The storylines—interwoven with use of match cuts and recurring visual motifs—reflect the themes and interplay of love and mortality.

Aronofsky originally planned to direct The Fountain on a $70 million budget with Brad Pitt and Cate Blanchett in the lead roles, but Pitt's withdrawal and cost overruns led Warner Bros. Pictures to shut it down. Aronofsky rewrote the script to be sparser and was able to resurrect the film for $35 million with Jackman and Weisz in the lead roles. Principal photography ran from November 2004 to February 2005, and mainly took place on a sound stage in Montreal, Quebec. Aronofsky used macro photography to create key visual effects for The Fountain at a low cost.

The film was released theatrically in the United States and Canada on November 22, 2006 by Warner Bros. Pictures, with 20th Century Fox releasing in other territories. It was a box office bomb, only grossing $16.5 million worldwide against a production budget of $35 million, and received generally mixed reviews from critics, but it has gained a cult following since its release.

== Plot ==
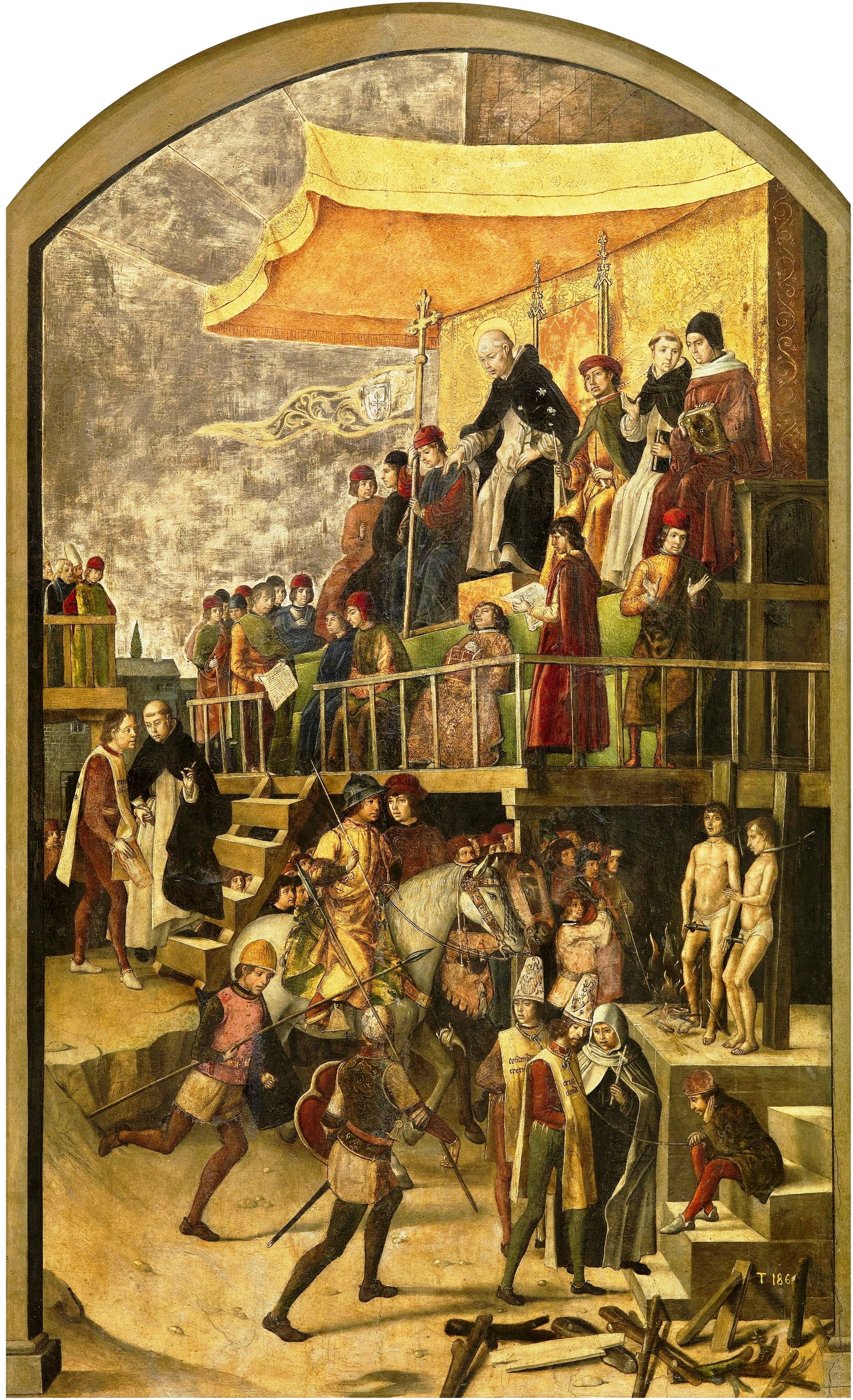
One of the film's narratives takes place during the Spanish Inquisition.

Conquistador Tomás Creo in New Spain fights a band of Maya to gain entry into a pyramid, where he is attacked by a Mayan priest. The story intercuts to Tom, a traveler in the twenty-sixth century who was tending a tall tree in a glass dome biosphere traveling through space, annoyed by a woman called Izzi. Finally, a third iteration, present-day surgeon Tommy Creo, is losing his wife Izzi to a brain tumor. Tommy is working on a cure using samples from a tree found through exploration in Guatemala, which are being tested for medicinal use for degenerative brain diseases in his lab. Izzi has come to terms with her mortality, but Tommy refuses to accept it, focused on his quest to find a cure for her.

She writes a story called "The Fountain" about Queen Isabella losing her kingdom to the Inquisition and a commission given by her to Tomás Creo to search for the Tree of Life in the Central American forest in Mayan territory. As she does not expect to finish her book, Izzi asks Tommy to finish it for her. As they look up at the golden nebula of Xibalba, she imagines, as the Maya did, that their souls will meet there after death when the star goes supernova. She dies shortly thereafter, and Tommy dedicates himself to curing not only her disease but death itself after seeing experimental success in reversing aging. His colleagues fear that this drive has made him reckless, but they support him in his scientific work and emotionally at Izzi's funeral. Tommy plants a sweetgum seed at Izzi's grave in the manner of a story she told him, relating how a Mayan guide's dead father lived on in a tree nourished by the organic nutrients of the buried body.

In the Mayan jungle, Tomás finds that most of his fellow knights are exhausted and refuse to continue searching for the Tree of Life. After a failed mutiny and the death of their priest guide, he takes the few who remain loyal with him to a pyramid, carrying a ceremonial dagger. Once he arrives at the pyramid, the first scene repeats, and Tomás engages in combat with the Mayan priest. Tom (whether he is a version of Dr. Tommy Creo, an element of Izzi's story, or an incarnation of Tommy himself in the future is unclear) spends much of his time performing physical or mental exercises, including a form of meditation allowing him to perceive and interact with the past.

In the past, Tomás was stabbed in the stomach, just as the priest was about to kill him, he appeared before the figurehead. The priest now believes Tomás is the "First Father" who birthed all life. Tomás kills the priest as a sacrifice and proceeds to a pool with a large tree, convinced this is the Tree of Life. Tomás applies some of his sap to his torso and is cured of his stab wound. He drinks the sap flowing from the bark. But in a reenactment of the Mayan creation myth recounted earlier, his body is turned into flowers and grass that burst forth from it, and he literally gives rise to new life, killing himself in the process. In space, the tree finally dies just before the spaceship arrives at its destination, much to Tom's horror. A final vision of Izzi appears, comforting him in the face of his acceptance of death. The star goes supernova, engulfing the ship and everything within. Tom's body, engulfed by the dying star inside the nebula, is absorbed by the tree, causing it to flourish back to life. Izzi's apparition picks a fruit from the new tree of life and hands it to Tommy, who plants it in Izzi's grave, accepting her death and moving on.

== Cast ==
- Hugh Jackman as Tomás Creo / Dr. Tommy Creo / Tom the Space Traveler:
  A 16th-century Spanish conquistador set out in the deep jungles of Central America to find the elixir of life that was purported to come from the Fountain of Youth springing forth from a tree atop a Mayan pyramid, where he fiercely fought a Mayan high priest. In the present, a scientist discovers a South American tree with promising life-extending properties in an attempt to cure his wife of brain cancer. Five centuries later, a man journeys through deep space in a futuristic spherical spacecraft with a tree assumed to be the one Dr. Creo planted on the grave of his wife Izzi half a millennium earlier, heading toward a dying star believing its explosion will restore her. Jackman played all three characters in three interweaving narratives spanning a period of one thousand years, beginning in 1550 A.D.
- Rachel Weisz as Isabella I of Castile / Izzi Creo:
  A terminally-ill woman writes an unfinished manuscript titled "The Fountain" about a 16th-century Spanish queen held captive by a powerful Catholic priest, who sends her most loyal henchman to find a legendary tree she believes would free her and her subjects from the Inquisition. Weisz, speaking to The Guardian, shared how working with director Aronofsky, who was then in a relationship with her at the time of filming and release, was "very different to who we are around the house."
- Ellen Burstyn as Dr. Lillian Guzetti: Dr. Creo's lead surgeon and colleague at the laboratory who was concerned with Tommy not spending enough time with his dying wife as he obsesses over finding an end to death
- Stephen McHattie as Grand Inquisitor Silecio: His growing power and ruthless crackdown on the queen's loyal subjects, branded as heretics during the Inquisition, threatens the peace of her kingdom as he stages a coup against the Spanish queen
- Mark Margolis as Father Avila: The Franciscan priest who discovered the secret path to the Mayan temple deep in the jungles of Guatemala where the Tree of Life was hidden
- Cliff Curtis as Captain Ariel: Creo's fellow conquistador who believed that the quest to find the Tree of Life was a curse and was killed by Tomás in a fit of rage.

== Narrative structure ==
The three stories are interwoven with match cuts and recurring visual motifs; Hugh Jackman and Rachel Weisz play the main characters in all three narratives. Whether the actions in these stories are actual events, or symbolic, is not clear: director Darren Aronofsky emphasized that the storylines in their time periods and their respective convergences were open to interpretation. The director has said of The Fountain's intricacy and underlying message, "[The film is] very much like a Rubik's Cube, where you can solve it in several different ways, but ultimately there's only one solution at the end."

== Themes ==
In a 2012 interview outlining the path of life depicted, Aronofsky stated that "ultimately the film is about coming to terms with your own death," oftentimes driven by love. The film asks such questions as "What if you could live forever?" and depicts one man's journey to overcome death. Related to this path, Darren Aronofsky described the core of the film as "a very simple love story" about a man and a woman in love, with the woman's life cut short. The director researched people who were dying young, and learned from doctors and caregivers that such patients find new ways of coping. Aronofsky observed that the patients often die more alone because their families cannot recognize what happens to them, calling it "an incredible tragedy":

Instead of facing this tragedy in terror, she is coming to terms with what is happening to her... Many patients actually start opening up to the possibility of what's happening to them, but there's very little vocabulary to help them deal... We decided to expand it with this woman [Izzi] offering a gift to her husband as a metaphor that tells him where she's come to in her awe-inspiring journey towards death. Hopefully, through time, he'll be able to understand it and basically get where she is.

The Fountain's theme of fear of death is "a movement from darkness into light, from black to white" that traces the journey of a man scared of death and moving toward it. The film begins with a paraphrase of Genesis 3:24, the Biblical passage that reflects The Fall of Man. Hugh Jackman emphasized the importance of the Fall in the film: "The moment Adam and Eve ate of the Tree of Knowledge of Good and Evil, humans started to experience life as we all experience it now, which is life and death, poor and wealthy, pain and pleasure, good and evil. We live in a world of duality. Husband, wife, we relate everything. And much of our lives are spent not wanting to die, be poor, or experience pain. It's what the movie's about." Aronofsky also interpreted the story of Genesis as the definition of mortality for humanity. He inquired of the Fall, "If they had drunk from the Tree of Life [along with the Tree of Knowledge], what would have separated them from their maker? So what makes us human is actually death. It's what makes us special."

== Production ==
=== Development ===
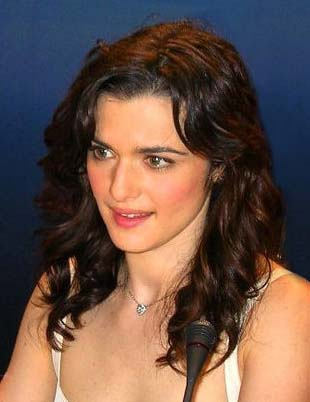
Production on The Fountain went through several stages of casting. Rachel Weisz joined the cast in August 2004 after Cate Blanchett moved on to other projects.

Director Darren Aronofsky sought to produce The Fountain after the release of Requiem for a Dream in 2000. In April 2001, he entered negotiations with Warner Bros. Pictures and Village Roadshow Pictures to direct the then-untitled film with actor Brad Pitt in the lead role. Requiem for a Dream was screened for Pitt, and the preliminary script for The Fountain persuaded the actor to join the project. Aronofsky prepared for production by traveling with a crew to Central America to consult with Mayan experts and to explore the Mexican ruins of Palenque. The group also visited Tikal, a jungle location featured in the 1977 film Star Wars.

In addition to the trip, the films Aguirre, the Wrath of God and The Holy Mountain were screened for the crew to inspire it in designing a rainforest set for The Fountain. In June 2001, actress Cate Blanchett entered talks to join Aronofsky's project. Aronofsky, who wanted the film's actual title to be a secret, gave the project the working title of The Last Man. Production was postponed to improve the script and to wait for Blanchett, pregnant when she joined, to give birth to her child in December 2001. The start date for production was tentatively set in summer 2002.

In June 2002, Warner Bros. met with Aronofsky and producer Eric Watson, expressing concerns over an escalating budget and threatening to cease the project unless a co-financier was found. Watson petitioned independent production companies for support and was able to enlist Regency Enterprises for assistance. Production was ultimately set for late October 2002 in Queensland and Sydney, Australia. The film, officially titled The Fountain, was 'greenlit' (approved for production) with a budget of $70 million, co-financed by Warner Bros. and New Regency, who filled the gap after Village Roadshow withdrew from the project. Preparation for production of The Fountain cost $18 million. Abruptly, Pitt, whose requested screenplay revisions were not met, left the project seven weeks before the first day of shooting. The actor went on to star as Achilles in director Wolfgang Petersen's Troy.

With the studio threatening to shut down the project, Aronofsky sent the script to actor Russell Crowe as a potential replacement for Pitt. However, Crowe, worn out from recently completing Master and Commander: The Far Side of the World, declined. In September 2002, Jeff Robinov, President of Production at Warner Bros. Pictures, announced that The Fountain would cease production, with Blanchett receiving compensation for her time and the Australian crew being fired from the halted project. Sets built for the production of the film, including a 10-story Mayan temple, were eventually auctioned off, in addition to props and other items. Pitt said that he was disappointed to leave and added, "I remain encouraged that The Fountain will yet have its day."

Aronofsky began to develop other films. When he looked over the books he used to research for The Fountain, he decided to return to The Fountain, feeling closer to it creatively than the other possible projects. Without a studio and an actor, he decided to write a "no-budget" version of the film, using his experiences filming Pi and Requiem for a Dream with small budgets. In February 2004, Warner Bros. resurrected Aronofsky's project and began to court actor Hugh Jackman to replace Pitt in the lead role. The film received a second greenlight with a budget of $35 million, in part because of the director's willingness to leave costly set pieces out of the screenplay. In August, actress Rachel Weisz joined Hugh Jackman for the film, filling the vacancy left by Blanchett. Filming lasted 60 days in early 2005 and took place mainly on a sound stage in Montreal.

=== Writing ===
Aronofsky and his friend Ari Handel created the story for The Fountain, and Aronofsky wrote the screenplay. When Aronofsky saw The Matrix in 1999, he considered it a film that redefined the science fiction genre. He sought to make a science fiction film that would explore new territory in the genre like The Matrix and its predecessors Star Wars and 2001: A Space Odyssey. Aronofsky had in mind a science fiction film that would go beyond the other films whose plots were driven by technology and science. The director said, "We've seen it all. It's not really interesting to audiences anymore. The interesting things are the ideas; the search for God, the search for meaning."

In 1999, when Aronofsky turned 30 years old, his parents were diagnosed with cancer. He began reflecting on human mortality, "That was a really heavy-duty emotional time. I know it's a very young age, but turning thirty marks when your twenties are over, and you could start considering, 'Wow, one of these days I'm actually going to die.'" While his parents overcame cancer, he began to focus on the concept of a young man saving a loved one from a life-threatening disease. He shared the concept with Handel, his undergraduate school roommate at Harvard University. Handel earned a Ph.D. in neuroscience from New York University but was uncertain about a future in neuroscience. He recalled the discussion, "Darren and I just started talking about the story. We kept wanting to talk more about it as the story kept getting bigger. I decided to make some life choices to continue working with Darren, because it was so much fun."

The director relied on a change of locale to inspire him to write Pi and Requiem for a Dream. For The Fountain, Aronofsky was inspired by a research trip he took to Guatemala with Handel to learn about Mayan history and philosophy. The script for The Fountain was influenced by the accounts of Uruguayan journalist Eduardo Galeano, who wrote examples of myth from an indigenous perspective, particularly Galeano's Genesis trilogy. The film Once Upon a Time in America also served as an influence on the script. Aronofsky, influenced by Bernal Díaz del Castillo's The Conquest of New Spain, applied the narrative in writing the film's conquistador scenes.

Aronofsky realized that since writing in 2000 the battle scene between the armies of Mayans and conquistadors, The Lord of the Rings film trilogy, Troy, King Arthur, and other films had featured massive battle scenes. He felt less inclined to mimic the scale and rewrote the battle to be mainly between Jackman's conquistador character and the Mayans. The director realized that, with one man against the army, the rewrite was a suitable metaphor for his film's theme of a man defying odds to do the impossible and conquer death.

The filmmakers researched space travel and Mayan culture, including its history, religion, and spirituality. They attended brain surgeries with the actors. With the research in place, Aronofsky said, "We decided which things we wanted to be purely factual and which things we wanted to bend." The director did not strive to be historically accurate with the various time periods, perceiving the entire film as a setting of a fairy tale. He said, "It was more about painting a relationship between a queen and her warrior, and just using that for more fantasy reasons."

=== Casting ===
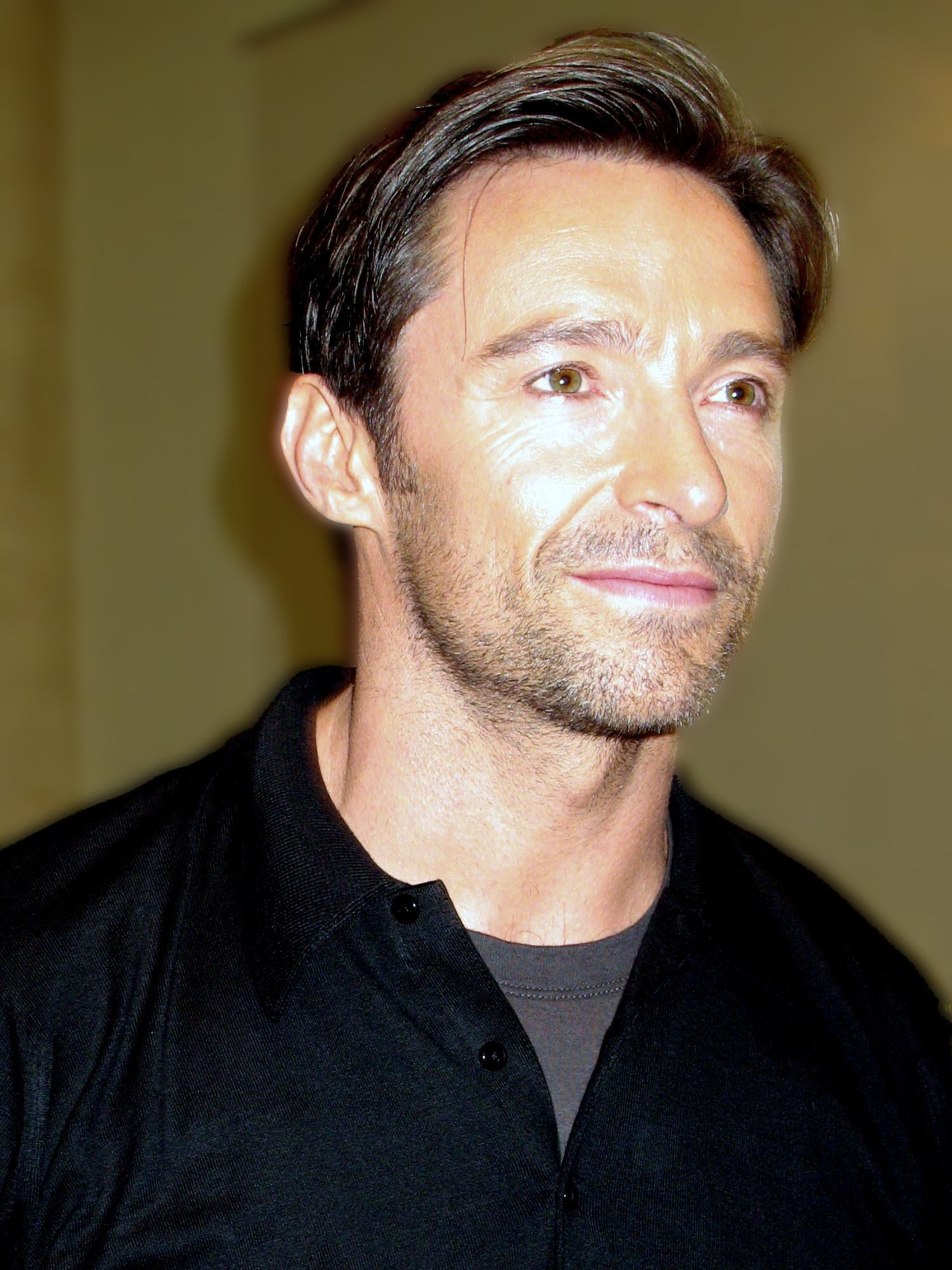
Hugh Jackman, who plays multiple characters in The Fountain, was chosen to star in the film after Brad Pitt dropped out and the project was halted.

Aronofsky saw Hugh Jackman perform as Peter Allen in the Broadway musical The Boy from Oz and was impressed with his performance. The director met with Jackman, who sought "a role that could show a lot of dimension," and cast him into the lead role in The Fountain. Jackman starred previously as the muscular character Wolverine in the X-Men films, so for The Fountain, he exercised to adopt a slimmer figure. Jackman practiced tai chi for seven months to demonstrate it in a 30-second scene. He also practiced yoga for over a year to achieve the lotus position for scenes set in space. For these scenes when he is seen in the position in mid-air, he was immersed in a swimming pool and harnessed to a rig that rotated him 360 degrees so his clothes floated freely about him.

Jackman also watched a woman undergo brain tumor surgery and was shaken to see the woman have similar blond hair to his wife: "All I could think of was my wife on that table. As much as I'd read the script and theorized and practiced philosophy, I knew in that moment that I was so not ready for death." For his various characters, the actor assumed a different posture for each persona. As the conquistador, Jackman was upright and forward-leaning to evoke an unstoppable nature. As the scientist, the actor hunched over with a dedicated focus on his character's work, being weighed down by the "world on his shoulders." As the space traveler, Jackman practiced the state of zen but also exhibited a continued persistence in his endeavor.

Jackman suggested that Aronofsky cast Rachel Weisz as his character's wife. The director, who was in a relationship with the actress, had originally hesitated to show the studio signs of favoritism in casting Weisz. With Jackman's earnest recommendation, the actress was cast as Izzi/Isabel. For her role, Weisz read books and first-person accounts about people who had terminal illnesses. The actress also visited hospitals to see young people who were dying and under hospice care. "There were a few days where I was in the headspace where I could say: 'I could go now'," said Weisz. Jackman and Weisz used American accents in the film's contemporary storyline, while in the 16th-century Spanish Inquisition sequences, Jackman adopted a British accent and Weisz used her native British accent as Isabella I of Castile, reflecting the convention of using British accents in historical settings.

The Fountain also stars Ellen Burstyn as Dr. Lillian Guzetti, Tom's superior, and Mark Margolis as Father Avila, who accompanies Tomás the conquistador. Burstyn and Margolis appeared in Aronofsky's Requiem for a Dream, and the director wrote into the script roles for both of them. Sean Patrick Thomas, Donna Murphy, and Ethan Suplee were cast as assistants to Tom's lab work. Cliff Curtis was cast as Captain Ariel, a fellow conquistador, and Stephen McHattie was cast as Grand Inquisitor Silecio, a religious fanatic who threatens the Spanish queen. Seventy extras were cast as Maya warriors, including twenty who had actual Guatemala Mayan backgrounds. One of the twenty, a real-life spiritual leader, was cast as the Maya spiritual leader in the film.

=== Design ===
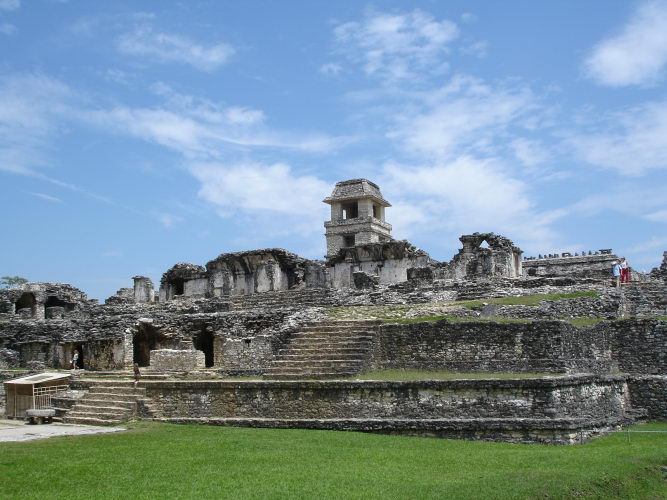
The climax of the past storyline takes place at a Mayan temple such as this one in Palenque, Mexico. To research the film, Darren Aronofsky took a trip to Mexico and Guatemala, where he visited Mayan ruins.

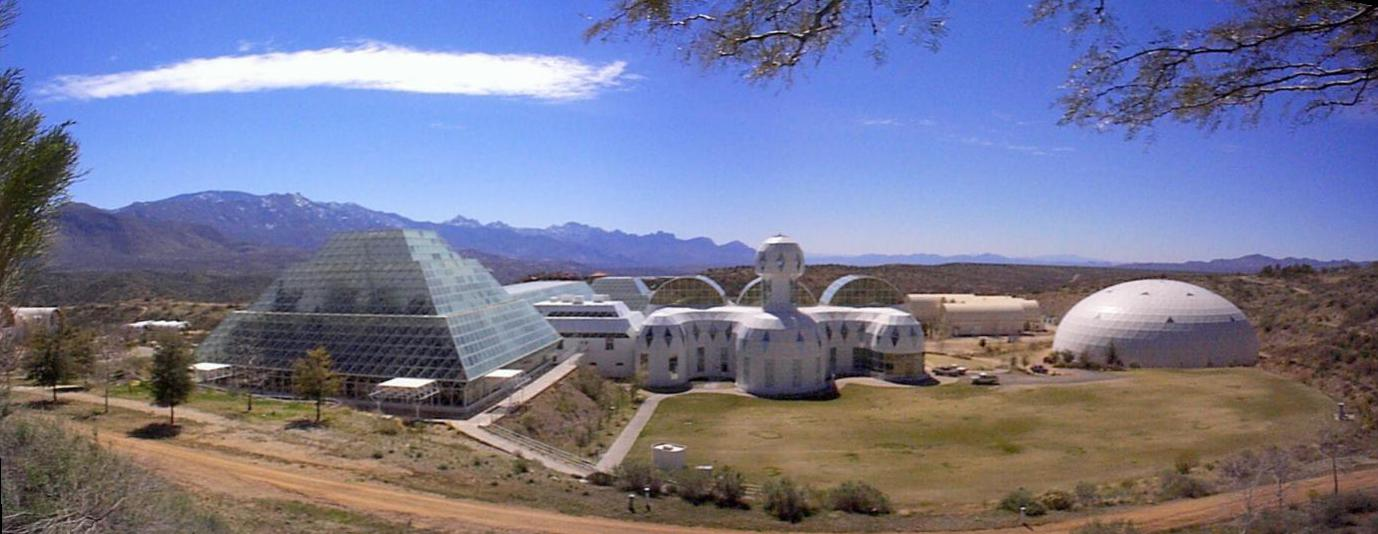
The design of the space traveler's ship was inspired in part by Biosphere 2 near Tucson, Arizona.

The film's locations, except scenes filmed at a museum and at a farmhouse, were built on the Montreal sound stage. Production designer James Chinlund and his crew built sets for The Fountain in a large warehouse in Montreal. The sets included the 16th-century jungle settings and the bubble-shaped spacecraft containing the tree of life and its garden. The spacecraft set was placed against greenscreen, and the crew hung colored reflective material, which included green, black, gold, and silver, on three circular tracks around the set. One material would be moved into place instead of the heavy equipment, and with the other materials partitioned off, a light source was used with the preferred material. Silver was used for scenes in which the spacecraft moved through the stars, and gold was used for scenes in which it entered the nebula.

In The Fountain, the Tree of Life was a central design and part of the film's three periods. The tree was based on Kabbalah's Sefirot, which depicts a "map" of creation to understand the nature of God and how he created the world ex nihilo (out of nothing). The Sefirot Tree, being two to three hundred feet tall in lore, had to be resized for The Fountain to fit in the camera's frame. Pieces of driftwood and pieces from real trees in Canada were collected for the tree's branches and roots, and sculpted molds of the pieces were applied to a steel frame to create the tree's body. According to production designer James Chinlund, the tree, part of an enormous set surrounded by green screens, and other sets presented difficult logistical problems because of the small budget given to the resurrected project. The tree set itself had been a collaboration between Chinlund, Aronofsky, and cinematographer Matthew Libatique to create the appropriate design, particularly the palette in comparison to the biospheric ship that carries the tree in the astronaut period. Aronofsky described the astronaut period as a homage to David Bowie's "Space Oddity"; the protagonist's name "Tom" originating from the Major Tom of the popular song. Co-writer Ari Handel researched biospherics, such as the Biosphere 2, to help design the ship that carried the protagonist and the tree through space. With respect to the glass-sphered ship's design, Aronofsky argued, "There is no reason a spaceship would be built like a giant truck in space."

Aronofsky and cinematographer Matthew Libatique also discussed using a limited palette of colors, an approach that started with Aronofsky's Pi and continued with Requiem for a Dream. In The Fountain, the primary colors are gold and white. Gold represents "the Mayans, a sort of fool's gold, a false truth"; Aronofsky explained the choice, "When you see gold, it represents materialism and wealth and all these things that distract us from the true journey that we're on." White was chosen to represent mortality and truth. Weisz's characters are white and wear white or are enveloped in white light to accentuate this presentation. Secondary colors are green, representing the color of life, and red, representing death. The director also used similar geometric constructs in the film to distinguish the three storylines. The 16th-century conquistador's tale reflected triangles through pyramids and constellations, the 21st century researcher's period reflected rectangles through doors, windows, and computer screens, and the 26th-century contemplative's journey reflected circles and spheres through the spacecraft and stellar bodies.

=== Filming and cinematography ===
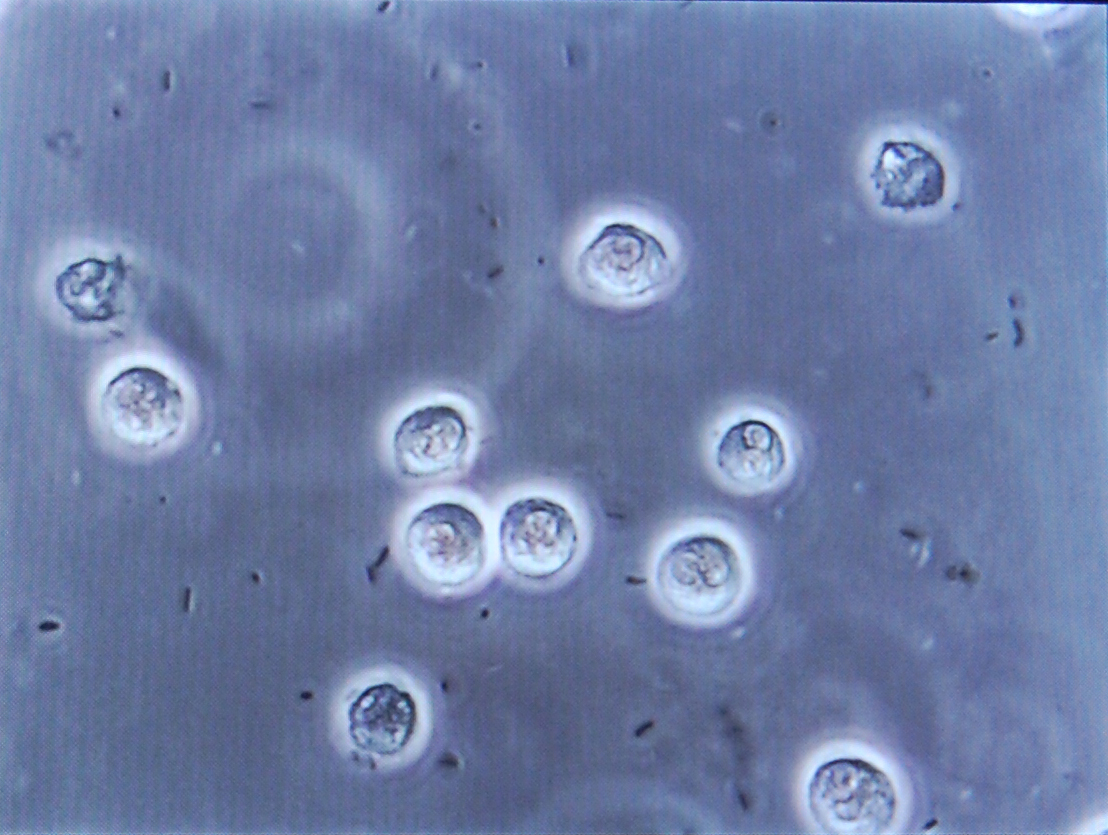
Rather than resort to CGI for special effects, Aronofsky preferred trick photography, such as enhancing photographs of microorganisms

Principal photography for The Fountain began on November 22, 2004, and wrapped up on February 23, 2005. Cinematographer Matthew Libatique, who worked with Aronofsky throughout the 1990s, shot The Fountain under Aronofsky's direction. Libatique prepared for over a year for The Fountain when Aronofsky tried to produce the film for the first time. When production restarted on a smaller budget, Libatique felt that the more budget-conscious approach resulted in a better film. "I think the streamlining of the film helped us tell the story more effectively. It's been stripped down to its core, to what it's really about: a search for immortality, when the truth of life is mortality."

Aronofsky planned to have a strong presentation of the thematic movement from darkness into light. He originally sought to show only a silhouette of the man until the second act of the film, but he chose not to be so extreme, wanting to be more communicative to the audience. The movement was presented less aggressively in the film; Jackman's characters are seen in silhouette at the beginning, kept out of key light. In each of the three periods, the lighting on Jackman's characters is initially dim and gradually grows brighter as the storylines unfold. Meanwhile, Weisz's characters are frequently awash with light in the storylines. Libatique described the metaphoric change of the lighting on Jackman's characters, "We follow the arc of the Thomas character as he gets closer and closer to the truth."

Aronofsky preferred to use one camera whenever possible, only using a second camera if the scene was more about the setting and could be shot from two distinctly different axes. Libatique said Aronofsky preferred the eyeline match, "Darren is big on eyelines, and if you sacrifice an eyeline on an angle, he feels it nullifies the shot and de-emphasizes the performances." Aronofsky originally intended to have Jackman's characters always moving in an "unusual" left-to-right direction across the frame, but the plan was complicated by the spacecraft needing to move upward toward a light source.

=== Visual effects ===
Special effects in The Fountain (0:37)
Modern-day Thomas is briefly washed in golden light before the scene shifts to the space traveler's bubble floating in space. The visual effects of the star Xibalba and its nebula were created using macro photography of fluids.

When production restarted in 2005, there was a more budget-conscious approach to filming The Fountain, whose original budget was mostly intended for visual effects. Libatique reflected, "Visual effects comprised of a lot of the budget in the original conception. The popcorn moments were in there to justify the budget and bring target audiences into the theater. Ultimately, I think the streamlining of the film helped us tell the story more effectively. It's been stripped down to the core, to what it's really about: a search for immortality, when the truth of life is mortality. I think at the end of the day, the theme of the film will be easier to feel."

To create a death scene, Aronofsky drew from Mayan mythology the description of flowers and butterflies emerging from the bodies of valiant warriors when they die. Aronofsky excluded butterflies from the death scene to minimize the film's computer-generated imagery but kept the effect of flowers bursting from the body.

Jeremy Dawson and Dan Schrecker, who had provided visual effects for Darren Aronofsky's π and Requiem for a Dream, returned to The Fountain to help the director with the film's effects. The pair was assigned the task of creating as little computer-generated imagery as possible, a difficult task with a third of the film taking place in deep space. Aronofsky chose to avoid effects that would make the film look dated in several decades but instead hold up as well as a film like 2001: A Space Odyssey. Dawson said, "Using CG is really the easy route because it's so prevalent and the tools are great. What it did was really force us to come up with creative solutions to solve a lot of our problems."

One creative solution was uncovering Peter Parks, a specialist in macro photography, who had retrieved deep-sea microorganisms and photographed them in 3-D under partial funding from the Bahamas government. Parks brewed chemicals and bacteria together to create reactions that Schrecker and Dawson shot, recording 20,000 feet worth of film over eight weeks. To create the effects, Peter Parks took advantage of fluid dynamics, which affected the behavior of the substances that he photographed. "When these images are projected on a big screen, you feel like you're looking at infinity. That's because the same forces at work in the water—gravitational effects, settlement, refractive indices—are happening in outer space," Parks said. The specialist's talent convinced the film's creative department to go beyond computer-generated imagery and follow Parks' lead. Instead of millions of dollars for a single special effects sequence, Parks generated all the footage for the film for just $140,000.

The visual-effects company Look Effects worked on 87 shots for The Fountain that included major set extensions, digital mattes, image enhancement, face replacement, and blemish removal, as well as animating key elements to the film's story. Henrik Fett, the visual effects supervisor of Look Effects, said, "Darren was quite clear on what he wanted and his intent to greatly minimize the use of computer graphics... [and] I think the results are outstanding."

=== Music ===
"Death Is the Road to Awe" from The Fountain soundtrack
The climax to the song "Death Is the Road to Awe" includes several of the elements that Mansell used in scoring The Fountain—strong percussion, the blending of classical music from Kronos Quartet's strings and a choir with the post-rock performance of Mogwai, and an epic scope that attempts to weave together the different storylines from the film.

Clint Mansell—the composer for Aronofsky's previous films Pi and Requiem for a Dream—reprised his role for The Fountain. The San Francisco-based string quartet Kronos Quartet—who previously performed for the Requiem for a Dream soundtrack—and Scottish post-rock band Mogwai also contributed to the film score. Mansell researched possible scores to compose one tying together the three storylines and sought to have an organic feeling to the score and explored implementing orchestral and electronic elements that would have "a real human element to them that breathes." While reading the script, Mansell was reminded of the post-rock music of Mogwai as well as Godspeed You! Black Emperor and Sigur Rós and initially planned a score based around percussion before adding the string quartet and choir. The soundtrack was released by Nonesuch Records in 2006 and received numerous award nominations.

== Marketing ==
When Warner Bros. shut down pre-production of The Fountain in 2002, Aronofsky reserved rights to publish a graphic novel based on the script that was not produced. He said, "I knew it was a hard film to make, and I said, at least if Hollywood fucks me over, at least I'll make a comic book out of it." He shopped the story to Vertigo Comics and met comic book artist Kent Williams, whose illustrations impressed him. Aronofsky hired Williams to create the graphic novel, and Ari Handel, co-writer for the film, provided Williams with research, photographs, and images on "Mayans, astronomy, pulsars, and all kinds of cool stuff" for the graphic novel's design. Aronofsky gave Williams the freedom to interpret the story as the artist saw fit.

The Fountain was originally scheduled to be released on October 13, 2006, but the film was delayed to create a "long-lead campaign" and generate anticipation via word of mouth. The release date was ultimately set for November 22, 2006. Aronofsky shared his screenplay with eleven artists: Phil Hale, Martin Wilner, Jason Shawn Alexander, Kostas Seremetis, Dave Gibbons, Barron Storey, James Jean, Jim Lee, Olivier Bramanti, Seth Fisher, and Bill Sienkiewicz. He invited them to interpret the screenplay in each one's chosen medium, and the interpretations were intended to be available on the film's website. Aronofsky also published a book about the film that contained production stills, the original script, original art, and observations by the film's creators. The content and research agency Ramp Industry launched The Fountain Remixed, an official website driven by user-generated content. Users could download freely provided audio parts from The Fountain's film score, remix the music, and upload the work onto the website to be evaluated by other users.

== Release ==
The film had its world premiere at the 63rd Venice Film Festival on September 2, 2006. Several critics booed The Fountain at the festival's press screening, while the film received a 10-minute standing ovation at the public screening the following evening. The Fountain was released in 1,472 theaters in the United States and Canada on November 22, 2006, a day before the American Thanksgiving holiday. The film earned $3,768,702 in the U.S. and Canadian box office during the opening weekend of November 24. The Fountain earned $10,144,010 in the United States and Canada, and $5,761,344 in other territories. The film, which had a production budget of $35 million, grossed $15,978,422 in theaters worldwide. The box-office performance was considered a flop with the film only earning back 54% of its budget. The film was originally rated R for "some violence" by the MPAA, though Aronofsky successfully won the appeal for a PG-13 rating, without any cuts.

== Critical reception ==
On the review aggregator website Rotten Tomatoes, 52% of 206 critics' reviews are positive, with an average rating of 6.4/10. The website's consensus reads: "The Fountain—a movie about metaphysics, universal patterns, Biblical symbolism, and boundless love spread across one thousand years—is visually rich but suffers from its own unfocused ambitions." Metacritic, which uses a weighted average, assigned the film a score of 51 out of 100, based on 36 critics, indicating "mixed or average" reviews. Audiences surveyed by CinemaScore gave the film a grade C− on scale of A to F.

Newsweek reported how people received the film: "Its supporters admire the film's beauty and daring; its detractors find it overblown and hokey."

Michael Atkinson, writing for Sight & Sound, reviewed Aronofsky's endeavor: "It's difficult to recall another American film that, in pursuing a passionate and personal vision, goes so maddeningly, uproariously wrong." Atkinson said of the narrative, "The erratic and pointless leapfrogging between its storylines is torporific ... all three stories are assembled piecemeal, many of which repeat over and over as flashbacks and flashforwards." He complained of the numerous motifs, "It's difficult to swallow the amalgamation of Mayan, Biblical, Buddhist, Taoist, and New Age iconography, all of it tossed as if into a stew."

In contrast, Glenn Kenny of Premiere wrote of the film, "The Fountain is probably the deftest stories-within-stories narrative film I've seen ... By The Fountain's end, the multilayered meta-narrative... resolves (or does it?) into a kind of diegetic Möbius strip, to stunning effect." Kenny called the film "as demanding as it is dazzling" and compared Aronofsky's direction to Stanley Kubrick's "in terms of conceptual audacity and meticulousness of execution." He concluded, "It's a movie that's as deeply felt as it is imagined."

Anthony Lane, reviewing for The New Yorker, called The Fountain "a gorgeous nimbus of confusion." Lane complained about the film's up-close and far-away shots, "What fails to concern or attract Aronofsky is the place where most of us hang out—the in-between, the midshot of everyday existence." He summarized, "The movie may have significant truths to impart, although I have my doubts, but it feels too inexperienced, too unworldly, to have earned the right to them." Roger Ebert, who admired Aronofsky's previous films, conceded in the Chicago Sun-Times that The Fountain was "not a great success." He identified the film's problematic aspects: "too many screens of blinding lights," "too many transitions for their own sake," and "abrupt changes of tone." He believed that the scaling down of the film from Aronofsky's original ambition lost some elements and anticipated a director's cut truer to Aronofsky's vision.

In 2009, Aronofsky reflected on the reception of The Fountain:

There are a lot of Fountain-haters out [at the Venice Film Festival]. The film's about the fact that it's OK that we die, and we should come to terms with it. But many, many people don't want to think about that, so why pay money for a meditation on losing someone you love? Everything about western culture denies that. It was pre-Obama, smack in the middle of Paris Hilton time. But there has been a serious turn now, people are starting to realise that the party's over, finally. So we can stop thinking about the culture of superficiality, and start to remember that other things are going on.

In the book Positive Psychology at the Movies: Using Films to Build Virtues and Character Strengths, Ryan M. Niemiec and Danny Wedding cite the film as one that depicts the development of perspective. "[Jackman's character's] denial and work addiction are obstacles to the development of the strength of perspective, but he can confront those obstacles as he develops acceptance and wisdom, represented by themes drawn from both Buddhism (meditation, rebirth, reincarnation) and Christianity (eternal life, faith, and love)."

In 2016, it was listed as number 484 on Empire's 500 Greatest films of all time.

== Home media ==
The Fountain was released on DVD, HD DVD and Blu-ray in the United States on May 15, 2007. The included extras were the theatrical trailer and a six-part featurette gallery about the film's periods and settings. Aronofsky was disappointed with the limited extras available on home video. He reported that Warner Bros. did not want to have the director record a commentary track because it felt the commentary would not help sales. He hoped to petition for the film to be re-released in the Criterion Collection with extras that were not made available on the initial media. Aronofsky recorded a commentary track on his own and made the track available on his personal website. In December 2008, he expressed interest in reassembling The Fountain, not as a director's cut, but as an alternate story that combined theatrical footage and unused footage.

== Notes ==
- ^{i} Warner Bros. Pictures distributed The Fountain theatrically in North America, with TFM Distribution distributing in France, Kinowelt Filmverleih distributing in Germany and Austria, Ascot Elite distributing in Switzerland and 20th Century Fox distributing in international territories.

== Bibliography ==
- Calhoun, John (November 2006). "Eternal Love". American Cinematographer. 87 (11): 50–60, 62–63. ISSN 0002-7928.
- Goldsmith, Jeff (September 2006). "The Fountain". Creative Screenwriting. 13 (5): 53–57. ISSN 1084-8665.
- Macaulay, Scott (October 2006). "Death Defying". Filmmaker. 15 (1): 40–45, 128, 130–131. ISSN 1063-8954.
- Skorin-Kapov, Jadranka (2015). Darren Aronofsky's Films and the Fragility of Hope. Bloomsbury Academic. ISBN 978-1-5013-0697-6.
- Aronofsky, Darren (2006). The Fountain. Universe. ISBN 0-7893-1495-9.
