= Steve Pickton =

- Also known as: Stasis; The Other World Collective; Paul W. Teebrooke; Phenomyna; Skye; Soul 223; Sugar-Plum
- Origin: UK
- Genres: Techno
- Occupations: musician, producer, DJ
- Years active: 1993 - present
- Labels: Peacefrog Records; B12 Records; Pure Plastic; Likemind

Steve Pickton a.k.a. Stasis is an English electronic-techno musician, record producer and sound engineer. He started with a release on B12 Records under his Stasis moniker. After that, he released quite a number of 12-inch records and albums on several labels as Stasis, Paul W. Teebrooke, Phenomyna and The Otherworld Collective. His latest alias is Soul 223.

Steve Pickton's music is characterized by a dreamy, melodic, melancholic, yet powerful and energetic sound, combining Detroit-influenced beat patterns and basslines with beautiful string sounds.

Besides his solo work, he also collaborates with Mark Broom and Dave Hill as Kapé I'llmusier or Ted Howler Rhythm Combo.

He also set up a label called Otherworld.

== Discography ==
=== Albums ===
- Inspiration - (Peacefrog Records, 1994)
- From The Old To The New - (Peacefrog Records, 1996)

=== Singles ===
- "Circuit Funk" (12") - (Peacefrog Records, 1993)
- "Disco 4000" (12") - (Time Is Right, 1993)
- "Likemind 01" (12") - (Likemind, 1993)
- "Point Of No Return!" (12") - (B12 Records, 1993)
- "History Of Future" E.P. (12", EP) - (Mo Wax Excursions, 1996)
- "Block" (12") - (Pure Plastic, 1997)
- "Sound Of Stas" (12") - (Multiplex, 1997)
- "Split" (7") - (Smallfish, 2001)
- "Past Movements" (3xLP) - (Peacefrog Records, 2003)
- "Old Skool Reunion" (12") - (Pure Plastic, 2005)
