= Cokni O'Dire =

British ragga MC, DJ and hip hop artist

Cokni O'Dire aka Jah CoknI, King CoknI, OTO and Uncle O Williams (born 1967) is a British ragga MC, DJ and hip hop artist best known for being a member of the original Scheme Team featured on the Rhyme Syndicate/Epic Records release of Divine Styler's Word Power.

== Biography ==
Cokni was born in Wembley, London, Middlesex, England but was raised in various parts of New York. The first crew he joined was El Producto in Cambria Heights, Queens, where he was the Human B-Box for LL Cool J, during the time when rhymed with the Albino Twins in the early 1980s. He battled many who wielded the art of oral percussion, one of which was Rahzel, in a competition judged by Biz Markie. Initially known for having a thick ragga inspired vocal style, he coined the phrase 'Shock Out' in the Los Angeles hip hop dance circle during the years of 1989 and 1990. Cokni later joined Divine Styler In the Original Scheme Team, when Divine got signed to Epic Records, and was featured on Divine's debut album, Wordpower. After the Scheme Team had broken up, Cokni went on to pursue a successful career as a turntablist and a music promoter promoting reggae dance hall and hip hop for Delicious Vinyl Records. After contributing to various drum and bass and various hip hop tracks, he later had a short reunite with former Scheme Team member, Divine Styler, to contribute vocals to House of Pain's last album, Truth Crushed To Earth Shall Rise Again and Divine Styler's Wordpower 2.

== Recent projects ==
He had a radio program called The OTO Hour on KXLU Los Angeles. In the club scene he has become a staple as a resident DJ/MC of Chocolate Bar, KPL, Umoja Hi Fi and Positive Rhythm events. Currently he is featured on the French release of an Italian production called Allegro - Someone Else featuring L.V. and Fresh Game. He currently resides in Dallas, Texas, broadcasting an online radio show Decent Something which was formerly on Beatminerz Radio and De La Soul's Dugout with DJ Maseo. Now he broadcasts independently from his home or wherever in the world there is WiFi. He been married since 1995 to the mother of his children, with whom they have two daughters and a son.
