= Word Power (album) =

Studio album by Divine Styler
- Released: October 23, 1989
- Genre: Hip hop
- Length: 53:59
- Labels: Rhyme $yndicate; Epic
- Producers: Bilal Bashir; Divine Styler

Divine Styler chronology
Word Power (1989)	Spiral Walls Containing Autumns of Light (1992)

Singles from Word Power
- 1. "Ain't Sayin Nothin/Tongue of Labyrinth" Released: 1989

Word Power is the debut album by American rapper and producer Divine Styler. It was released on October 23, 1989, on Ice-T's Rhyme $yndicate Records under Epic Records. The album peaked at No. 62 on the Billboard Top R&B/Hip-Hop Albums chart. The Scheme Team, a hip hop collective of Divine Styler, made their introduction on the record.

Divine rhymed about being proud of heritage (highlighted on "It's a Black Thing") and featured audio production handled by Bilal Bashir (who made later instrumentals for the likes of Everlast, Dr. Dre, and Ice Cube), who later re-released this album in instrumental form in 2005. The album produced the only lead single "Ain't Sayin' Nothin", featuring a scratch noise similar to the sound used in "Jump Around" and "Insane in the Brain". It peaked at No. 10 on the Billboard Hot Rap Songs chart.

== Critical reception ==
Professional ratings
Review scores
Source	Rating
AllMusic	4/5 stars
Chicago Tribune	3.5/4 stars

The Chicago Tribune called the album "exciting, and that isn't a word you can use to describe many recent rap releases."

== Track listing ==
No.	Title	Length
1.	"Introduction"	0:46
2.	"Free Styler"	5:17
3.	"Get Up on It"	4:40
4.	"The Last Black House on the Left"	6:45
5.	"It's a Black Thing"	5:09
6.	"Play It for Divine"	2:47
7.	"Koxistin U4ria"	3:40
8.	"Ain't Sayin' Nothin'"	4:16
9.	"Divinity Stylistics"	4:11
10.	"Tongue of Labyrinth"	5:23
11.	"In Divine Style"	1:46
12.	"Rain"	4:31
13.	"Word Power"	4:48
Total length:		53:59

Samples

- "Introduction" sampled "Long Hot Summer Night" by Jimi Hendrix (1968) and "Sign of the Times" by Bob James (1981)
- "Freestyler" sampled "Talkin' Loud and Sayin' Nothing" by James Brown (1972) and "I Know You Got Soul" by Bobby Byrd (1971)
- "Get Up on It" sampled "Get Up, Get into It, Get Involved" by James Brown (1970), "Push It" by Salt-N-Pepa (1986) and "Soul Power 74" by Maceo Parker (1974)
- "The Last Black House on the Left" sampled "Shut Up" by Moonfou (1987)
- "It's a Black Thing" sampled "Pot Belly" by Lou Donaldson (1970), "Say It Loud – I'm Black and I'm Proud" by James Brown (1968) and "Good Old Music" by Funkadelic (1970)
- "Play It for Divine" sampled "Star Wars Theme/Cantina Band" by Meco Monardo (1977), "Shorty Rides Again" by Eddie Harris & Les McCann (1971), "Scorpio" by Dennis Coffey & the Detroit Guitar Band (1971), "It's a New Day" by James Brown (1970) and "Get on the Good Foot" by James Brown (1972)
- "Koxistin U4ria" sampled "I Can't Stop" by John Davis and the Monster Orchestra (1976)
- "Ain't Sayin' Nothin" sampled "Shoot Your Shot" by Jr. Walker & the All Stars (1965), "Talkin' Loud and Sayin' Nothing" by James Brown (1972), "Shack Up" by Banbarra (1975), "If You Don't Get It the First Time, Back Up & Try It Again, Parrty" by Fred Wesley & the J.B.'s (1974) and "Nuthin'" by Doug E. Fresh & the Get Fresh Crew (1986)
- "Divinity Stylistics" sampled "Superfly" by Curtis Mayfield (1972)
- "Tongue of Labyrinth" sampled "Din Daa Daa (Trommeltanz)" by George Kranz (1983) and "UFO" by ESG (1981)
- "Rain" sampled "Skylarking (Studio One Version)" by Horace Andy (1969) and "Ring the Alarm" by Tenor Saw (1985)
- "Word Power" sampled "What's Going On" by Marvin Gaye (1971)

== Personnel ==
- Bilal Bashir – producer, scratches
- Lawrence A. Duhart – co-producer, recording, mixing
- Glen E. Friedman – photography
- Tracy Lauren Marrow – executive producer
- Robert Joseph Pfeifer – executive producer
- Mark Richardson – main artist, producer
- Tony Sellari – design, art direction
- Otis Olivier Lyjasu Williams – featured artist (tracks 11–12)
