= Unkle discography =

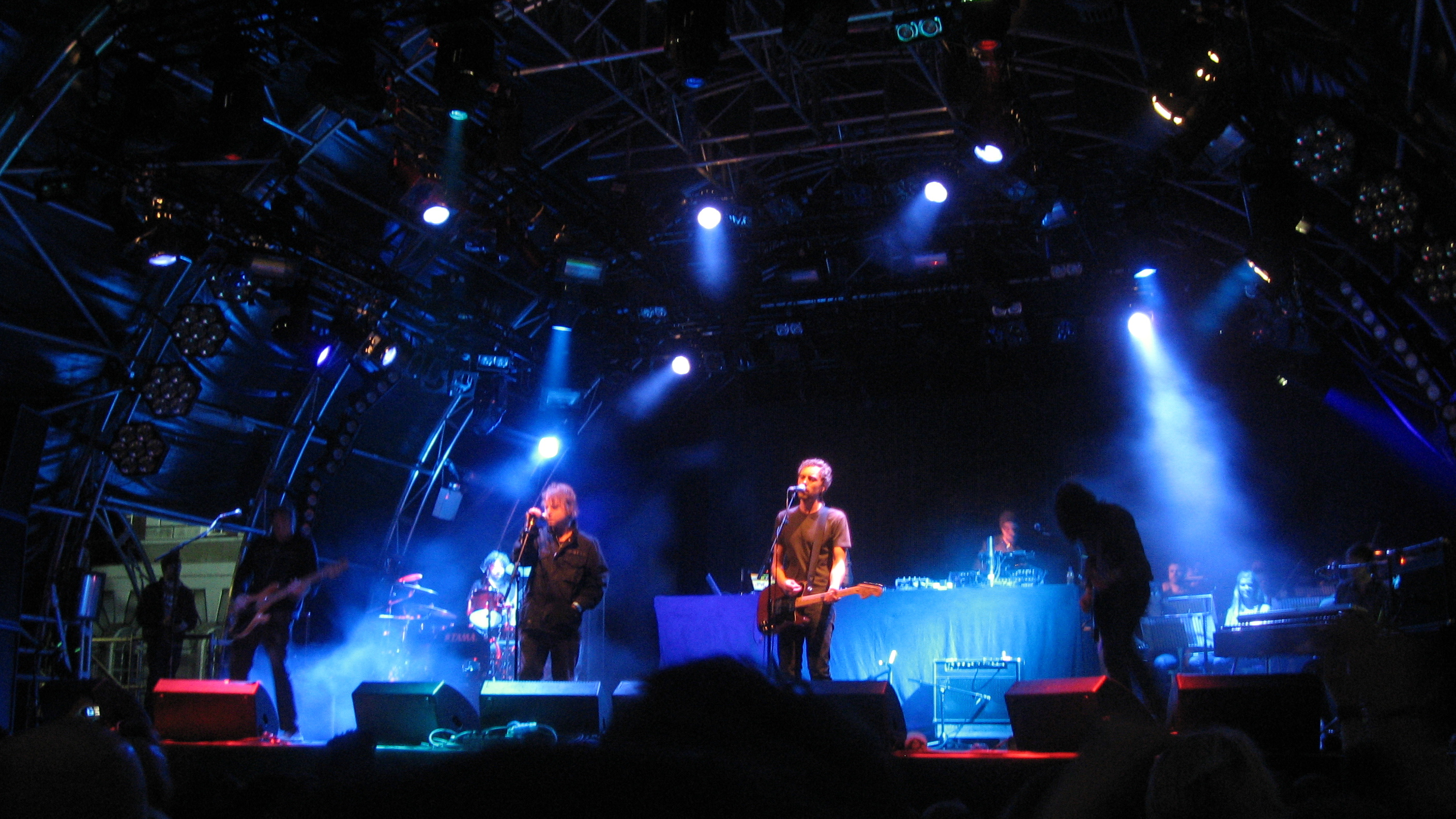
- Unkle performing at Somerset House in 2008.
- Studio albums: 5
- Extended plays: 8
- Live albums: 2
- Compilation albums: 2
- Singles: 16
- Music videos: 15
- Remix albums: 2
- Mix albums: 5
- Promotional singles: 12
- Mixtapes: 3

The discography of Unkle, a British electronic group, consists of five studio albums, two compilation albums, two live albums, two remix albums, five mix albums, two mixtapes, eight extended plays (EPs), sixteen singles, twelve promotional singles and fifteen music videos.

== Albums ==
=== Studio albums ===
List of albums, with selected chart positions
Title	Album details	Peak chart positions									
Title	Album details	UK	AUS	BEL	FRA	GER	NOR	NZ	SWI	US	US Dance
Psyence Fiction	Released: 24 August 1998; Label: Mo' Wax; Formats: CD, CS, LP	4	15	22	39	77	18	33	—	107	—
Never, Never, Land	Released: 22 September 2003; Label: Mo' Wax; Formats: CD, CS, LP	24	71	—	82	—	—	—	—	—	6
War Stories	Released: 2 July 2007; Label: Surrender All; Formats: CD, LP, digital download	58	58	50	84	—	—	—	58	—	39
Where Did the Night Fall^{[I]}	Released: 10 May 2010; Label: Surrender All; Formats: CD, LP, digital download	42	67	68	102	—	—	—	94	—	7
The Road: Part 1	Released: 18 August 2017; Label: Songs for the Def; Formats: CD, LP, USB, CS, digital download	16	—	106	—	92	—	—	55	—	—
"—" denotes releases that did not chart or were not released in that territory.

I Where Did the Night Fall was re-issued in 2011 under the title Where Did the Night Fall: Another Night Out. The re-issue peaked at number 141 on the UK Albums Chart.

=== Compilation albums ===
Title	Album details	Peak chart positions		
Title	Album details	UK	BEL	FRA
More Stories	Released: 16 January 2008; Label: Pod (Australia) Traffic Inc. (Japan); Formats: CD	—	—	—
End Titles... Stories for Film	Released: 7 July 2008; Label: Surrender All; Formats: CD, LP, digital download	70	82	174

=== Remix albums ===
List of albums, with selected chart positions
Title	Album details	Peak chart positions
Title	Album details	UK
Edit Music for a Film: Original Motion Picture Soundtrack Reconstruction	Released: 2005; Label: UNKLE Sounds; Formats: CD	96
Self Defence: Never, Never, Land Reconstructed and Bonus Beats	Released: 2006; Label: Global Underground; Formats: CD	—
End Titles...Redux	Released: 15 December 2008; Label: Surrender All; Formats: CD	—
"—" denotes releases that did not chart or were not released in that territory.

=== Mix albums ===
List of albums
Title	Album details
Do Androids Dream of Electric Beats?	Released: December 2002; Label: UNKLE Sounds; Formats: CD
Do Androids Dream of Essential Beats?^{[II]}	Released: 30 June 2003; Label: UNKLE Sounds; Formats: CD
Where the Wild Things Are^{[II]}	Released: 2004; Label: UNKLE Sounds; Formats: CD
WWIII – Unklesounds vs. U.N.K.L.E	Released: 2004; Label: UNKLE Sounds; Formats: CD
Original Artform	Released: September 2007; Label: Silly Thing; Formats: CD

II For the releases of Do Androids Dream of Essential Beats? and Where the Wild Things Are, Unkle were credited as "UNKLE Soundsystem".

=== Mixtapes ===
List of mixtapes, with selected chart positions
Title	Album details	Peak chart positions
Title	Album details	UK
The Road: Part II (Lost Highway)	Released: 29 March 2019; Label: Songs for the Def; Formats: CD, LP, digital download	33
Rōnin I	Released: 26 March 2021; Label: Studio:UNKLE; Formats: Digital download, streaming	—
Rōnin II	Released: 31 August 2022; Label: Studio:UNKLE; Formats: Digital download, streaming	—

== Extended plays ==
List of extended plays, with selected chart positions
Title	EP details	Peak chart positions
Title	EP details	UK
The Time Has Come	Released: 1994; Label: Mo' Wax; Formats: CD, 12"	73
Self Defence E.P. - Never, Never, Land Reconstructed and Bonus Beats	Released: 13 November 2006; Label: Global Underground; Formats: CD, 12"	—
Night's Temper EP (A Prelude to War Stories)	Released: 14 May 2007; Label: Surrender All; Formats: CD, 7", digital download	—
Remix Stories Vol. 1	Released: 8 September 2008; Label: Surrender All; Formats: Digital download, CD	—
Remix Stories Vol. 2	Released: 6 April 2009; Label: Surrender All; Formats: Digital download, CD, 12"	—
Where Did the Night Fall Mix EP	Released: 12 September 2010; Label: Surrender All/Essential; Formats: Digital download	—
The Answer EP	Released: 13 September 2010; Label: Surrender All; Formats: Digital download, CD, 12"	—
Only the Lonely	Released: 4 April 2011; Label: Surrender All (UK) Pod (Australia); Formats: Digital download, CD	—
"—" denotes releases that did not chart or were not released in that territory.

== Singles ==
List of singles, with selected chart positions
Title	Year	Peak chart positions		Album
Title	Year	UK	US Dance Sales	Album
"Berry Meditation"	1997	77	—	non-album singles
"Ape Shall Never Kill Ape" (featuring Nigo and Scratch Perverts)	1997	—	—	non-album singles
"Rock On"	1997	—	—	non-album singles
"Last Orgy 3" (featuring Takagi Kan)	1997	—	—	non-album singles
"Rabbit in Your Headlights" (featuring Thom Yorke)	1998	—	—	Psyence Fiction
"Be There" (featuring Ian Brown)	1999	8	—	Psyence Fiction
"Narco Tourists" (Slam vs. Unkle)	2001	66	—	Alien Radio Remixed
"Eye for an Eye"	2003	31	—	Never, Never, Land
"In a State" (featuring Graham Gouldman)	2003	44	—	Never, Never, Land
"Reign" (featuring Ian Brown and Mani)	2004	40	14	Never, Never, Land
"Burn My Shadow" (featuring Ian Astbury)	2007	112	—	War Stories
"Hold My Hand"	2007	—	—	War Stories
"Restless" (featuring Josh Homme)	2008	—	—	War Stories
"Heavy Drug" (Surrender Sounds Mix)	2010	—	—	Where Did the Night Fall
"Natural Selection" (featuring The Black Angels)	2010	—	—	Where Did the Night Fall
"Follow Me Down" (featuring Sleepy Sun)	2010	—	—	Where Did the Night Fall
"God of Light (Original Game Soundtrack)"	2014	—	—	non-album single
"—" denotes releases that did not chart or were not released in that territory.

=== Promotional singles ===
List of promotional singles
Title	Year	Album
"If You Find Earth Boring"	1998	The Time Has Come
"Guns Blazing (Drums of Death, Pt. 1)" (featuring Kool G Rap)	1998	Psyence Fiction
"Bloodstain"	1998	Psyence Fiction
"Celestial Annihilation"	1998	Psyence Fiction
"Cocaine and Camcorders" (vs. South)	2001	Sexy Beast soundtrack
"Safe in Mind (Please Take This Gun from Out My Face)" (Chris Goss Remix)	2004	Never, Never, Land
"Inside" (Future Beat Alliance Remix) (featuring Grant Nicholas)	2007	Never, Never, Land
"On a Wire" (featuring ELLE J)	2011	Where Did the Night Fall
"The Runaway" (featuring ELLE J)	2011	Where Did the Night Fall
"When the Night Falls/We Own the Night"	2011	Where Did the Night Fall
"Joy Factory" (featuring Autolux)	2011	Where Did the Night Fall
"Caged Bird" (featuring Katrina Ford)	2011	Where Did the Night Fall

== Other album appearances ==
=== Guest appearances ===
List of non-single guest appearances, with other performing artists, showing year released and album name
Title	Year	Album	Artist
"Hello/Goodbye (Uncool)"	2007	Lupe Fiasco's The Cool	Lupe Fiasco

=== Remixes for other artists ===
List of remixes by Unkle for other artists, showing year released and release name
Title	Year	Album	Artist
"Vibe P.M." (Stranger Things Have Happened – Brazil on a Jimmy Hill Mix)	1993	Marble	Mondo Grosso
"Bellbottoms" (Old Rascal Mix)	1995	Experimental Remixes	Jon Spencer Blues Explosion
"Planet Telex" (Karma Sunra Mix)	1995	"Just" single	Radiohead
"Karmacoma" (UNKLE Situation)	1995	"Karmacoma" single	Massive Attack
"Shounen" (Unkle's Remix)	1995	The Geisha "Remix" Girls Show	Geisha Girls
"DJed" (Bruise Blood Mix)	1996	"DJed" single	Tortoise
"Natural One" (Unkle Mix)	1996	"Natural One" single	The Folk Implosion
"Natural One" (Instrumental Mix)	1996	"Natural One" single	The Folk Implosion
"Natural One" (Unkle No Skratch Mix)	1996	"Natural One" single	The Folk Implosion
"Pepper" (Short Shot Mix)	1996	"Pepper" single	Butthole Surfers
"Where It's At" (Unkle Remix)	1996	"Where It's At" single	Beck
"Agent Dan" (Unkle Remix)	1997	"Agent Dan" single	Agent Provocateur
"New Walk" (Unkle Remix)	1997	"Cavern" single	Liquid Liquid
"Vitamin C" (Unkle Mix)	1997	Sacrilege	Can
"Li303ve" (Suzuki Dekard San)	1997	Socks, Drugs and Rock and Roll	Buffalo Daughter
"Free Fall" (Remix by Unkle)	1997	FM - Fantasma Remixes	Cornelius
"Nishiehigashie" (West Remix)	1998	"Nishiehigashie" single	Mr. Children
"People Are Strange" (Unkle Mix)	1998	"People Are Strange" single	Stina Nordenstam
"Bullitproof" (Unkle Remix)	1999	"Bullitproof" single	Breakbeat Era
"Dolphins Were Monkeys" (Unkle vs. South Remix)	1999	Golden Greats	Ian Brown
"Battle" (Unkle Remix)	1999	"No Distance Left to Run" single	Blur
"Battle" (Unkle Remix)	1999	Overused	South
"Leaders and Believers" (Unkle Remix)	1999	The New Testament of Funk	Emperor's New Clothes
"The World Is Not Enough" (Unkle Remix)	1999	"The World Is Not Enough" single	Garbage
"Over My Head" (Unkle Mix)	1999	"Over My Head" single	Furslide
"Over My Head" (Unkle Instrumental)	1999	"Over My Head" single	Furslide
"Without You I'm Nothing" (Unkle Remix)	1999	"Without You I'm Nothing" single	Placebo featuring David Bowie
"Paint the Silence" (Unkle Variation)	2000	"Paint the Silence" single	South
"Hey Jack" (Unkle Metamorphosis Mix)	2001	Folk.	Howie B.
"I'm Not Trading" (Unkle - In Utero)	2001	"I'm Not Trading" single	Sunna
"I'm Not Trading" (In Utero Instrumental)	2001	"I'm Not Trading" single	Sunna
"F.E.A.R." (Unkle Mix)	2002	Remixes of the Spheres	Ian Brown
"F.E.A.R." (Unkle Instrumental)	2002	Remixes of the Spheres	Ian Brown
"GDMFSOB" (Unkle Uncensored) (feat. Roots Manuva)	2002	The Private Press (tour edition) and The Private Repress	DJ Shadow
"Frantic" (Unkle Remix)	2003	"Frantic" single	Metallica
"No One Knows" (Unkle Reconstruction)	2003	"Go with the Flow" single	Queens of the Stone Age
"Colours in Waves" (Unkle Reconstruction)	2003	"Colours in Waves" single	South
"The Incredibles Theme" (Unkle Reconstruction)	2004	The Incredibles – The Remix EP	Michael Giacchino
"Time Is My Everything" (Unkle Reconstruction)	2005	"Time Is My Everything" single	Ian Brown
"Cast No Shadow" (Unkle Beachhead Mix)	2005	Goal! soundtrack	Oasis
"Burn the Witch" (Unkle Variation)	2005	Saw II soundtrack	Queens of the Stone Age
"The Enchanter" (Unkle Reconstruction)	2005	"The Enchanter" single	Robert Plant and the Strange Sensation
"The Enchanter" (Unkle Reconstruction Dub)	2005	"The Enchanter" single	Robert Plant and the Strange Sensation
"John the Revelator" (Unkle Reconstruction)	2006	"John the Revelator" / "Lilian" single	Depeche Mode
"Today" (Unkle vs. Mode Showdown Remix)	2006	"Today" single	Junkie XL
"Life2Live" (Unkle Surrender Sounds Session #1)	2006	"Lfe2Live" / "Feels Closer" (Remixes) single	Layo & Bushwacka
"False Flags" (Unkle Surrender Sounds Session #2)	2006	"False Flags" single	Massive Attack
"No Hits" (Unkle Surrender Sounds Session #3)	2006	Introducing... (Selected Works)	Black Mountain
"I Feel Speed" (Unkle Remix)	2007	"I Feel Speed" single	Dubfire
"I'm Designer" (Unkle Remix)	2008	Era Vulgaris (German tour edition)	Queens of the Stone Age
"The Step & the Walk" (Rich File Remix)	2008	"The Step & the Walk" single	The Duke Spirit
"Turnstile Blues" (Unkle Surrender Sounds Session #4)	2008	More Stories	Autolux
"Movin'" (Unkle Surrender Sounds Session #9)	2008	i-Panik: Remixed	Skylark
"The X-Files Theme (Variation on a Theme)" (Unkle Surrender Sounds Session #10)	2008	The X-Files: I Want to Believe soundtrack	Mark Snow
"Icicles" (Unkle Surrender Sounds Session #12)	2008	"Icicles" single	Evil Nine
"The Little Things" (Unkle Surrender Sounds Session #13)	2009	Wanted: Weapons of Fate soundtrack	Danny Elfman
"Too Young to Love" (Unkle Surrender Sounds Session #14)	2009	Global Underground 037: James Lavelle – Bangkok	The Big Pink
"Main Title Theme Song" (UNKLE Remix)	2013	The Walking Dead (AMC Original Soundtrack - Vol. 1)	Bear McCreary
"Romance Dawn" (UNKLE Reconstruction)	2013	"Romance Dawn" single	Radkey
"UNKLE Reconstruction"	2014	Dconstructed	Michael Giacchino

== Music videos ==
List of music videos, showing year released and director
Title	Year	Director(s)
"Rabbit in Your Headlights"	1998	Jonathan Glazer
"Be There"	1999	Jake Scott
"Eye for an Eye"	2003	Shynola
"Reign"	2004	Daniel Askill
"Burn My Shadow"	2007	Miguel Sapochnik
"Hold My Hand"	2007	Mark Locke
"Restless" (version 1)	2008	James Ward
"Restless" (version 2)	2008	Anastasia Kirillova
"Natural Selection"	2010	Isaac Klotz
"Follow Me Down"	2010	Warren du Preez and Nick Thornton Jones
"Where Did the Night Fall"	2010	Warren du Preez and Nick Thornton Jones
"The Runaway"	2010	Warren du Preez and Nick Thornton Jones
"The Answer" (version 1)	2010	John Hillcoat
"The Answer" (version 2)	2010	Ross Cairns
"Money and Run"	2010	Tom Haines
"Another Night Out"	2012	Toby Dye
