= Only the Lonely (EP) =

EP by Unkle
- Released: 4 April 2011
- Genre: Electronic
- Label: Surrender All
- Producer: UNKLE

Unkle chronology
The Answer EP (2010)	Only the Lonely (2011)

Only the Lonely is an EP released by Unkle on 4 April 2011. Its entire track list also appears on Unkle's Where Did the Night Fall – Another Night Out.

== Track listing ==
1. "Money and Run" (featuring Nick Cave)
2. "The Dog Is Black" (featuring Leila Moss)
3. "Only The Lonely" (dub)
4. "Wash The Love Away" (featuring Gavin Clark)
5. "Sunday Song" (featuring Rachel Fannan)
6. "Forever" (featuring Ian Astbury) *Australia only bonus track
