= End Titles... Stories for Film =

Compilation album by Unkle
- Released: 7 July 2008
- Genre: Trip hop; electronic
- Length: 74:46; 51:52 (End Titles... Redux)
- Label: Surrender All
- Producer: UNKLE; Chris Goss

Unkle chronology
More Stories (2008)	End Titles... Stories for Film (2008)	Where Did the Night Fall (2010)

Alternative cover
- Cover of End Titles... Redux

Professional ratings
Aggregate scores
Source	Rating
Metacritic	56/100
Review scores
Source	Rating
AllMusic	3.5/5 stars
Alternative Press	3.5/5 stars
Dotmusic	7/10
The Guardian	3/5 stars
Mojo	3/5 stars
musicOMH	3/5 stars
The Observer	2/5 stars
Pitchfork	4.3/10
Uncut	4/10
Under the Radar	7/10

End Titles... Stories for Film is a compilation album by British electronic music act Unkle, inspired by feature films created since Unkle's previous 2007 album War Stories, released on 7 July 2008. Unlike their previous album, the 2005 mix Edit Music for a Film: Original Motion Picture Soundtrack Reconstruction, "End Titles..." is composed of original material. It features collaborators: Josh Homme (of Queens of the Stone Age), Black Mountain, Gavin Clark, Joel Cadbury (of South), James Petralli (of White Denim), War Stories producer Chris Goss, Dave Bateman, and James Griffith of Lake Trout/Unkle's touring band.

== Background ==
In the credits to the album James Lavelle stated:

This is not the new Unkle album. It is a collection of pieces of music recorded in the two years since we completed War Stories. As we were finishing that album, Pablo Clements, my brother Aidan and I set up a studio, Surrender Sounds. [...] One of the most enjoyable areas we have been exploring over the years is the area of audio-visual collaborations, music for film, television, computer games and the like. However, there is a rather frustrating side to this type of creative endeavour. A lot of the music you're making ends up sitting on the shelf, neither properly released nor heard. A waste, really we thought. So this album is our attempt to alleviate our musical frustrations whilst hoping that it will find a wider audience.

== Release ==
The track "Trouble in Paradise (Variation on a Theme)" is a full-length version of a track from the BMW commercial that was aired on British television. "Chemical" originally appeared as an instrumental on Unkle's album War Stories under the title "Chemistry". Josh Homme, who also sang on "Restless" from the same album, now sings vocals over the track. Tracks "Blade in the Back", "Synthetic Water" and "Heaven" made their first appearance on Unkle's Japanese-Australian album More Stories.

The limited edition CD of End Titles... Stories for Film is packaged in a four panel wrap around digipak with an embossed gloss finish and includes a 12-page booklet.

=== X-Files end titles ===
The premiere of End Titles... Stories for Film has been promotionally linked to Unkle's "reinterpretation" of Mark Snow's "The X-Files Theme" as an end title for The X-Files sequel feature movie, The X-Files: I Want to Believe, although the newly recorded track is not featured on Unkle's album. Beside the song "Broken" from War Stories, it will be featured on the movie's score soundtrack "The X-Files: I Want to Believe: Original Score" (composed by Snow).

- On 10 July 2008 British radio network Xfm informed that the track "X-Files (Unkle Variation on a Theme) – Surrender Sounds Session #10" was available to free download.

== Redux Release ==
On 8 December 2008 seven re-interpreted tracks from End Titles… Stories For Film, with two unreleased tracks "When Once It Was" and "A Perfect Storm", were released digitally as End Titles... Redux. The official UNKLE store offered 3000 limited-edition CDs of the album. The exclusive package is a 6-panel soft-pack with a 12-page booklet, with images by Robert Del Naja.

Several tracks from the Redux edition were included in a collaboration with fashion house Alexander McQueen titled Unkle For McQ for the Autumn/Winter 2009 collection, which was given away at an Alexander McQueen press day.

== Track listing ==
All track written by James Lavelle, Pablo Clements, James Griffith except where noted

1. "End Titles" – 0:35
2. "Cut Me Loose" (featuring Gavin Clark) – 5:24
3. "Ghosts" [vocals by James Lavelle] (C. Goss, D. Bateman) – 4:57
4. "Ghosts (String Reprise)" – 0:39
5. "Kaned and Abel" – 1:04
6. "Blade in the Back" (featuring Gavin Clark) – 5:12
7. "Synthetic Water" – 1:06
8. "Chemical" (featuring Josh Homme) (C. Goss, J. Homme, R. File) – 2:48
9. "Nocturnal" (featuring Chris Goss, James Petralli and Robbie Furze) (C. Goss) – 5:01
10. "Cut Me Loose (String Reprise)" – 0:59
11. "Against the Grain" (featuring Gavin Clark) – 5:22
12. "Even Balance (Part Two)" (featuring Melinda Gareh) – 0:45
13. "Trouble in Paradise (Variation on a Theme)" – 5:01
14. "Can't Hurt" (featuring Gavin Clark & Joel Cadbury) (J. Cadbury) – 4:13
15. "24 Frames" – 4:45
16. "In a Broken Dream" – 1:24
17. "Clouds" (featuring Amber Webber & Stephen McBean) (D. Bateman, S. McBean) – 4:07
18. "Black Mass" – 3:08
19. "Open Up Your Eyes" (featuring Abel Ferrara) (A. Ferrara) – 2:43
20. "Romeo Void" – 2:11
21. "Heaven" (featuring Gavin Clark) – 6:58
22. "The Piano Echoes" Zeben Jameson – 5:24
23. "Dolphinarium" (Japanese and Australian bonus track) – 1:07
24. "On the Run" (Japanese and Australian bonus track) – 3:06

Tracks: 1, 5–7, 19–22 were taken from the film Odyssey in Rome.

=== End Titles... Redux ===
1. "When Once It Was" – 1:18
2. "Cut Me Loose (Redux)" (featuring Gavin Clark) – 4:57
3. "Can't Hurt (Redux)" (featuring Gavin Clark and Joel Cadbury) – 4:46
4. "Against The Grain (Redux)" (featuring Gavin Clark) – 5:40
5. "24 Frames (Redux)" – 5:05
6. "A Perfect Storm" – 3:15
7. "Heaven (Redux)" (featuring Gavin Clark) – 10:20
8. "Nocturnal (Redux)" – 5:18
9. "Clouds (Redux)" (featuring Black Mountain) – 5:29
10. "Trouble in Paradise (Variation on a Theme)" – 5:44

=== 4 McQ – Autumn / Winter 2009 ===
1. "Intro: Unkle 4 MCQ" – 0:55
2. "Heaven" (Live Union Chapel Mix) – 6:49
3. "Persons and Machinery" (featuring Autolux) – 5:26
4. "Proximity" (Unreleased Able Skit) – 1:13
5. "Unknown" (String Reprise) – 0:24
6. "Heaven" (Acapella) – 0:06
7. "Mayday" – 3:17
8. "Ghosts" (String Reprise) – 0:42
9. "Against the Grain" (Hip Hop Mix) – 5:11
10. "24 Frames" (Redux) – 4:58
11. "Ghost" – 5:00
12. Danny Elfman – "Wanted: The Little Things" (Unkle Surrender Sounds Session #13 Dub Mix) – 4:06
13. "Blade in the Black" – 5:14
14. Queens of the Stone Age – "Burn the Witch" (Unkle Remix) – 2:54
15. "Morning Rage" – 5:15
16. "Trouble in Paradise" (Variation on a Theme) – 5:43

=== 4 McQ – Spring / Summer 2010 ===
1. "Hold My Hand" (Innervisions Orchestra Dub Mix)
2. "Twilight" (Layo & Bushwacka! Remix)
3. "Hold My Hand" (Dubfire Instrumental)
4. "Heavy Drug" (King Unique Smoke Nest Mix)
5. "Heavy Drug" (Surrender Sounds Mix)
6. "Heavy Drug" (Future Beat Alliance Remix)
7. "Burn My Shadow" (Slam Remix)
8. "Trouble in Paradise" (Variation on a Theme) (Unkle Surrender Sound Sessions #11)
9. "Burn My Shadow" (Gavin Herlilhy Remix)
10. "Heaven" (King Unique Remix)

== Charts ==
Chart (2008)	Peak position
Belgian Albums (Ultratop Flanders)	82
Belgian Albums (Ultratop Wallonia)	88
French Albums (SNEP)	174
UK Albums (OCC)	70
