= One of a Twin =

"One Of A Twin"

Single by Sunna

from the album Two Minute Terror
- Released: 14 September 2009
- Recorded: 2008–2009
- Genre: Metal
- Length: 4:37
- Songwriter(s): Jon Harris, Ian MacLaren

Sunna singles chronology
""I'm Not Trading""	"One Of A Twin"

"One Of A Twin" is a song by the British industrial music/hard rock band Sunna, it was released on 14 September 2009, through the band's official website www.sunnamusic.co.uk. It's the first single from Sunna's second upcoming album Two Minute Terror, which is also set to be released on 2 October 2009.

The Music Video for "One Of A Twin" was released on 11 September 2009 and was met with much positive feedback from Sunna's core fanbase, it was also considered a good change into a darker direction compared to most of Sunna's debut material.

== Music video ==
The video shows a man recording himself, in an unknown location, singing the lyrics of the song to the camera. At some points in the song, the mans location seems to change, as late on in the video he's lying down on a pillow, appearing to lose control of himself.

== Track listing ==
1. "One Of A Twin" - 4:38
