= Remix Stories Vol. 2 =

EP by Unkle
- Released: 6 April 2009
- Genre: Electronic
- Label: Surrender All
- Producer: UNKLE

Unkle chronology
Remix Stories Vol. 1 (2008)	Remix Stories Vol. 2 (2009)	Heavy Drug (Surrender Sounds Mix) (2009)

Remix Stories Vol. 2 is an EP released by Unkle. It is the second in a series of unreleased remixes from their albums War Stories and End Titles... Stories for Film. The EP was released on Beatport and vinyl on 6 April 2009, though the vinyl version was limited to 150 copies. The digital version contains all the songs from the vinyl version, as well as 6 additional remixes.

== Track listing ==
=== Vinyl version ===
- "Trouble in Paradise (Variation on a Theme)" (Carl Craig C2 Mix) – 10:08
- "Hold My Hand" (Innervisions Orchestra Dub Mix) – 8:17

=== Digital version ===
1. "Trouble in Paradise (Variation on a Theme)" (Carl Craig C2 Mix) – 10:05
2. "Hold My Hand" (Innervisions Orchestra Dub Mix) – 8:17
3. "Hold My Hand" (Innervisions Orchestra Instrumental) – 8:19
4. "Heaven" (King Unique Remix) – 9:45
5. "Heaven" (King Unique Bass Bliss Dub) – 3:47
6. "Heaven" (King Unique Acapella) – 3:28
7. "Trouble in Paradise (Variation on a Theme)" (Fergie Excentric Mix) – 9:16
8. "Keys to the Kingdom" (Lee Coombs Remix) – 5:33
