= Sunhouse =

A sunhouse is a lean-to Conservatory (greenhouse)

Sunhouse may also refer to:

- Sunhouse, dwellings found in Arnstein, Germany
- The Sunhouse (1925) by Joris Ivens
- Sunhouse (band)
