= More Stories =

- Japanese edition

Studio album by Unkle
- Released: 16 January 2008
- Genre: Trip hop; electronic
- Producer: Unkle; Chris Goss

Unkle chronology
War Stories (2007)	More Stories (2008)	End Titles... Stories for Film (2008)

Alternative cover
- Australian edition

More Stories is an album by English electronic music group Unkle, released in Japan on 16 January 2008, and in Australia on 31 January 2008. The album is a selection of works and remixes created during the War Stories era. The Japan exclusive release comes in a cardboard sleeve and the CD is wrapped in a cloth sleeve. It also includes a booklet and obi-strip.

The cover art was designed by Kazuki, with additional design by Ben Drury and James Lavelle.

== Track listing ==
=== Japanese edition ===
1. "Serene"
2. "Heaven"
3. "Turnstile Blues (Surrender Sounds Sessions #4)"
4. "Opened Dreams"
5. "Blade in the Back"
6. "Can't Stop"
7. "Synthetic Water"
8. "A Wash of Black"
9. "Burn My Shadow (Radio Slave Remix)"
10. "Hold My Hand (Buckley remix)"
11. "Burn My Shadow (Surrender Sounds Sessions #5)"

Tracks 1, 2, 4 and 7 are from the score for the film Odyssey in Rome. "Blade in the Back" was played live at Unkle's first London gig, at the time it was called "Swampy".

=== Australian edition ===
CD 1

1. Unkle, "Kaned and Able" (from the film Odyssey in Rome)
2. Unkle, "Heaven" (from the film Odyssey in Rome)
3. Autolux, "Turnstile Blues" (Surrender Sounds Sessions #4)
4. Unkle, "Opened Dreams"
5. Unkle, "Blade in the Back" (from the film Odyssey in Rome)
6. Unkle, "Can't Stop"
7. Unkle, "Synthetic Water" (from the film Odyssey in Rome)
8. Unkle, "A Wash of Black"
9. Layo & Bushwacka! – "Life2Live" (Surrender Sounds Sessions #1)
10. Unkle, "Burn My Shadow" (Radio Slave Remix)
11. Unkle, "Hold My Hand" (Dubfire Remix)
12. Unkle, "Burn My Shadow" Surrender Sounds Sessions #5

CD 2 Instrumental versions from War Stories

== Credits ==
- Compiled By – James Lavelle, Pablo Clements
- Computer (Pro Tools/logic) – Aidan Lavelle, Chris Allen, Pablo Clements
- Engineer – Chris Allen, Pablo Clements
- Mastered By – Howie Weinberg, Rob Thomas
- Mixed By – Chris Allen
- Producer – Chris Goss, UNKLE
- Producer (Credited To) – Aidan Lavelle, Chris Allen, James Lavelle, Pablo Clements, Richard File
- Programmed By – Aidan Lavelle, Chris Allen, Pablo Clements
- Written By – Aidan Lavelle, Chris Allen, James Lavelle, Pablo Clements
