= Crazy on the Weekend =

Crazy on the Weekend is the sole album by English indie band Sunhouse.

Working with producer John Reynolds, the band continued their practice of recording outside a studio environment, working in the producer's house in Notting Hill. Their acoustic-based songs were augmented by washes of strings and organ, earning comparisons to Nick Drake, Tom Waits and Beth Orton.

Sinéad O'Connor provides backing vocals on the track "Hard Sun".

Released in March 1998, Crazy on the Weekend had some critical success including a five star review in Uncut. It featured in the year end best of lists for Uncut, Les Inrockuptibles (both unordered) and Mojo (#15). Despite the critical success, the album sold poorly and the band never recorded again. Singer-songwriter Gavin Clark went on to form the band Clayhill and made several guest appearances on recordings by Unkle. Clark died in 2015.

== Tracklisting ==
1. "Crazy on the Weekend"
2. "Hurricane"
3. "Chasing the Dream"
4. "Spinning Round the Sun" (accordion by Carol Isaacs)
5. "Good Day to Die"
6. "Lips"
7. "Loud Crowd"
8. "Monkey Dead"
9. "Hard Sun"
10. "Swing Low" (organ/wurlitzer by Carol Isaacs)
11. "Animal"
12. "Second Coming" (hidden track)

== Personnel ==
- GAVIN CLARK - lead vocals, Harmonica, Acoustic guitar
- PAUL BACON - Guitars
- ROBERT BROOKS - bass
- DOMINIC DILLON - drums
- CAROL ISAACS - piano, accordion & keyboards
- SCREAMING ORPHANS - backing vocals
- MARK TAYLOR - Hammond
- SINEAD O'CONNOR - vocals ("Hard Sun")
- CAROLINE DALE - string section
