= Burn My Shadow =

Single by Unkle featuring Ian Astbury

from the album War Stories
- Released: 25 June 2007
- Genre: Electronic; trip hop; electronic rock
- Length: 4:57 (album version); 3:56 (radio edit)
- Songwriters: Ian Astbury: Rich File; Christopher Allen Goss; James Lavelle
- Producer: Unkle

Unkle featuring Ian Astbury singles chronology
| "Burn My Shadow" (2007) | "Restless" (2008) |

"Burn My Shadow" is a song by English electronic group UNKLE, featuring the vocals of Ian Astbury of The Cult. Despite its popularity on the band's album, War Stories, and being used in several films, the intro for the game Fuel, TV shows, promos and adverts, the song did poorly on the UK Singles Chart; peaking in at No.112 The music video was directed by Miguel Sapochnik and features actor Goran Višnjić.

== Notable appearances ==
- Trailer for Fuel.
- Soundtrack for CSI: NY episode 414, "Playing with Matches".
- Trailer for Alone in the Dark: Inferno.
- Trailer for Assassin's Creed: Brotherhood.
- Soundtrack for Repo Men.
- Played in Season 1 Episode 19 of Person of Interest.
- TV advert for Mercedes-Benz.
- TV advert for Ford Focus
- Played at the credits of The Raven
- Several occasions on Top Gear
- Played in Season 1, Episode 7 of Dr. Death

== Personnel ==
=== Unkle ===
- James Lavelle – keyboards, production, piano
- Pablo Clements – engineering, mixing

=== Other musicians ===
- Ian Astbury (The Cult) – vocals, guitar
- Chris Goss – guitar
- Jeordie White (Twiggy Ramirez) – bass
- Dave Henderson – drums

== Charts ==
| Chart | Peak position |
|---|---|
| UK Singles Chart | 112 |
