= The Time Has Come =

The Time Has Come may refer to:

== Music ==
=== Albums ===
- The Time Has Come (Anne Briggs album) or the title song, 1971
- The Time Has Come (Cassie Ramone album) or the title song, 2014
- The Time Has Come (The Chambers Brothers album), 1967
- The Time Has Come (Christy Moore album) or the title song, 1983
- The Time Has Come (Martina McBride album) or the title song (see below), 1992
- The Time Has Come: The Best of Ziggy Marley & the Melody Makers, 1988
- The Time Has Come, by 7th Heaven, 1990
- The Time Has Comme, by Weeping Willows, 2014
- The Time Has Come (EP), an EP by Unkle

=== Songs ===
- "The Time Has Come" (Martina McBride song), 1992
- "The Time Has Come" (Mike Oldfield song), 1987
- "The Time Has Come", by P. P. Arnold, 1967

== Other uses ==
- The Time Has Come (TV series), a 1960 West German TV series
- The Time Has Come, a 1971 book by K. Ross Toole
