= Power struggle (disambiguation) =

A power struggle can refer to:

- Power struggle - a situation where two or more people or groups fight to gain dominance over each other.
- “Power Struggle”, a song by the British industrial music/hard rock band Sunna
- NJPW Power Struggle, an annual professional wrestling event promoted by New Japan Pro Wrestling (NJPW)
