= Rich File =

British composer and music producer

- Also known as: Forme
- Genres: Electronica, breakbeat, trip hop
- Occupation(s): Composer, music producer, recording engineer, DJ
- Instrument(s): Vocals, keyboards, guitars, programming
- Years active: 1995–present
- Labels: Mo' Wax, Marine Parade Records
- Website: www.richfilemusic.com

Richard File (born 19 November 1975) is a British composer, music producer, and vocalist best known for his work with James Lavelle as part of Unkle. He has also released singles under the alias Forme.

== Career ==
File joined Unkle in 1999, having remixed "Unreal" (from the debut album Psyence Fiction) with added vocals from Ian Brown. For the subsequent Unkle albums Never, Never, Land (2004) and War Stories (2007), File is credited with piano, organ, synthesizer, guitar, and vocals, as well as co-production.

Working under the Unkle name, File remixed tracks by DJ Shadow, Queens of the Stone Age, Depeche Mode, The Duke Spirit, Garbage, and Placebo. File and Lavelle also released a number of DJ mixes under the name Unklesounds, including Edit Music for a Film: Original Motion Picture Soundtrack Reconstruction (2005).

In January 2008, File announced he was leaving Unkle after a decade of collaboration to pursue work with his new band We Fell to Earth alongside Wendy Rae Fowler.

We Fell to Earth released their debut eponymously titled album in 2009 and saw tracks feature in US dramas: "The Double" in Gossip Girl, CSI: NY and The Prisoner; "Lights Out" In Numb3rs; and "Careful What You Wish For" in CSI: NY. In winter 2010 We Fell to Earth composed and performed the theme song to AMC's The Killing.

In 2011, File produced The Invisible's second album Rispah (Ninja Tune, 2012). He also performed additional production and played omnichord on The Duke Spirit's album Bruiser (2011).
