= Self Defense =

Self-defense is a countermeasure that involves defending oneself

Self Defense may also refer to:

- Self Defense (1932 film), a Monogram Pictures film
- Self Defense (1983 film), an action-thriller film
- "Self Defense" (Homicide: Life on the Street), a 1999 episode of Homicide: Life on the Street
- Self Defense Family, an American band
- Self-Defence of the Republic of Poland, a political party in Poland
- Self Defence: Never, Never, Land Reconstructed and Bonus Beats, a 2006 album by Unkle
