= One Minute Science =

Studio album by Sunna
- Released: (United States) 15 August 2000 (United Kingdom) 6 November 2000
- Recorded: Christchurch Studios, Bristol
- Genre: Industrial metal; alternative metal; nu metal
- Length: 46:58
- Label: (United Kingdom) Melankolic (United States) Astralwerks; Virgin Records
- Producer: Sunna, Neil Davidge

Sunna chronology
One Minute Science (2000)	Two Minute Terror (2009)

Singles from One Minute Science
- 1. "O.D" Released: 2000; 2. "Power Struggle" Released: 2000; 3. "I'm Not Trading" Released: 2001

Professional ratings
Review scores
Source	Rating
Allmusic	2.5/5 stars
Alternative Press	3/5
Exclaim	favorable
NME	(unfavorable)
Pitchfork	3.2/10
PopMatters	(unfavorable)
Spin	4/10
Melody Maker	3/5 stars
Select Magazine	3/5 medals

One Minute Science is the debut studio album from the British industrial rock band Sunna.

The Album was released on 15 August 2000 in the United States on the Astralwerks label and on 6 November 2000 in the United Kingdom on the Melankolic label. Three singles were released for the album "O.D." "Power Struggle" and "I'm Not Trading".

== Track listing ==
All songs written and composed by Jon Harris and Ian MacLaren.

No.	Title	Length
1.	"I'm Not Trading"	3:50
2.	"Preoccupation"	4:33
3.	"Power Struggle"	4:01
4.	"I Miss"	4:36
5.	"Insanity Pulse"	3:49
6.	"Too Much"	3:45
7.	"O.D"	5:32
8.	"Forlorn"	4:19
9.	"Grape"	6:40
10.	"One Conditioning"	4:01
11.	"7%"	3:49

== Release and reception ==
"One Minute Science" had mixed reviews. Allmusic gave it 2.5 out 5 evaluating the voice of Jon Harris. Exclaim! magazine described the album as the best and most powerful of the 21 century. Kerrang magazine selected in 2001 Sunna "Best New Band".

== Chart positions ==
Album

One Minute Science

Year	Chart	Position
2000	UK Charts	151
