= Two Minute Terror =

Studio album by Sunna
- Released: 6 October 2009
- Recorded: 2002–2009
- Genre: Metal, industrial rock
- Length: 47:35
- Label: Independent
- Producer: Sunna

Sunna chronology
One Minute Science (2000)	Two Minute Terror (2009)	After The Third Pin (2011)

Two Minute Terror is the second studio album from the British industrial music/hard rock band Sunna. The album was released on 6 October 2009 in the United States and the United Kingdom on an independent label. It was the first album by the band in almost ten years.

== Background ==
During September 2008, rumours began to spread that a new Sunna album was being written and recorded, through a post from a 'Jon H' on a Sunna 'iLike' profile. After a long period of waiting, another teaser similar to the one previously posted was released, leading to many fans to believe that a new Sunna record was actually in the works.

On 8 June 2009, a prominent Sunna fanpage posted that they had been in contact with Jon Harris and Ian MacLaren's PR (Public Relations) Jay Williams. According to this source, Jon and Ian had completed the album, and it was expected to be released in September 2009.

Eventually, news of a new Sunna CD and tour was released, there would be a new album released and a new group of musicians put together to tour for 'Two Minute Terror'. The band had been recently been rehearsing for a tour, and dates were announced late 2009, with warm-up dates taking place in the band's native Bristol.

Two Minute Terror consists of both old and new material, including the song "Spider", which Sunna originally put together for the release of Spider-Man 2.

The first single from the album, "One Of A Twin" was released through the band's official website, the song being made available for download from on 14 September 2009, with an accompanying video released on the 11 September.

"Ashes to Ashes" was released for free through the band's official website on 25 September 2009.

The album was released on the 6 October 2009, and met with positive feedback from Sunna's fanbase.

== Track listing ==
All songs written and composed by Jon Harris and Ian MacLaren, except where noted.

No.	Title	Length
1.	"Spider"	4:30
2.	"One Of A Twin"	4:38
3.	"Know Who They Are"	4:33
4.	"Ashes To Ashes" (D. Bowie)	4:33
5.	"Rebirth"	3:38
6.	"Sex Glue"	4:14
7.	"Eyes"	3:38
8.	"God Says"	4:33
9.	"Heaven Sends"	3:19
10.	"You Had To Steal"	5:28
11.	"Empty"	5:02
12.	"Alice"	1:27
