= You Are Here (South album) =

Studio album by South
- Released: 28 April 2008
- Recorded: 2007–08
- Genre: Rock; Alternative rock Post-Britpop
- Label: Young American
- Producer: Brett Shaw

South chronology
Adventures in the Underground Journey to the Stars (2006)	You Are Here (2008)

Professional ratings
Review scores
Source	Rating
AllMusic	4/5 stars
Pitchfork	(4.8/10)

You Are Here is the fourth album by English band South, released on 28 April 2008.

== Track listing ==
1. "Wasted"
2. "Opened Up"
3. "Better Things"
4. "The Pain"
5. "Tell Me"
6. "She's Half Crazy"
7. "There Goes Your Life"
8. "The Creeping"
9. "Lonely Highs"
10. "Soul Receivers"
11. "Every Light Has Blown"
12. "Balloons"
13. "Zither Song"
14. "Final Interlude"
