= A Guide to Second Date Sex =

- Australian theatrical release poster
- Directed by: Rachel Hirons
- Written by: Rachel Hirons
- Produced by: David Wade; Savannah James-Bayly; Maggie Monteith; James Norrie
- Starring: George MacKay; Alexandra Roach; Michael Socha
- Cinematography: Paul MacKay
- Edited by: Lewis Albrow
- Music by: Toydrum
- Production companies: Addington Films; Dignity Film Finance; Shooting Script Films
- Distributed by: Sparky Pictures
- Release date: 31 October 2019
- Running time: 81 minutes
- Country: United Kingdom
- Language: English

A Guide to Second Date Sex is a 2019 British romantic comedy film directed by Rachel Hirons, starring Alexandra Roach and George MacKay. The film is based on the play of the same name by Rachel Hirons.

== Cast ==
- George MacKay as Ryan
- Alexandra Roach as Laura
- Michael Socha as Dan
- Naomi Willow as Vlogger
- Gillian Elisa as Val
- Emma Rigby as Tufts
- Holli Dempsey as Bianca
- Kae Alexander as Tali
- Tom Bell as Adam
- Louise Breckon-Richards as Therapist

== Reception ==
The film received mostly poor reviews from film critics. It has a 50% positive review score on Rotten Tomatoes based on 10 reviews. Sandra Hall of The Sydney Morning Herald gave the film 3 out of 4 stars.
