= After the Third Pin =

After The Third Pin

Studio album by Sunna
- Released: 3 October 2011
- Recorded: 2010
- Genre: Metal, industrial rock
- Label: Independent
- Producer: Sunna

Sunna chronology
Two Minute Terror (2009)	After The Third Pin (2011)	For Global Mourning (2013)

After The Third Pin (stylized as After The Thi3d Pin) is the third studio album from the British industrial music/hard rock band Sunna. The album was released on 3 October 2011 in the United States and the United Kingdom on an independent label.

== Background ==
On 12 January 2011, Sunna announced their third album would be released in late March 2011. They also released the official artwork and track listing, which were posted on Sunna's official Facebook page.

It was announced on 26 June 2011 that the album would be released on 3 October 2011.

The album was released on 3 October 2011 and was met with much positive feedback from Sunna's hardcore fanbase.

== Track listing ==
All songs written and composed by Jon Harris and Ian MacLaren.

No.	Title	Length
1.	"Suffer The Pain"	4:25
2.	"Forced Attrition"	3:14
3.	"Too Good"	4:45
4.	"Razing The Damned"	4:11
5.	"Dirt & Soda"	4:23
6.	"Hold Me Tight"	6:10
7.	"Feel The Blade"	3:35
8.	"After The Third Pin"	5:14
9.	"Emoticon Expression"	3:49
10.	"No Money"	3:47
11.	"Stutter"	4:10
12.	"Feel The Blade (Acoustic)" (Hidden track)	3:33
