= Heavy Drug (Surrender Sounds Mix) =

EP by Unkle
- Released: 16 August 2009
- Genre: Electronic
- Label: Surrender All
- Producer: UNKLE

Unkle chronology
Remix Stories Vol. 2 (2009)	Heavy Drug (Surrender Sounds Mix) (2009)	Where Did the Night Fall (2010)

Professional ratings
Review scores
Source	Rating
Ibiza Voice	6/10 stars

Heavy Drug (Surrender Sounds Mix) is an EP released by British electronic music group Unkle. According to James Lavelle, the track came about during a late night session, when he and his brother, Adian Lavelle, were working on serveal remix projects, which resulted in what they called a "happy accident". The track was reworked during the sessions for Where Did the Night Fall set for release in May 2010. A remix was made during the recording, entitled the Surrender Sounds Mix, which was featured on James Lavelle's Global Underground 037: Bangkok, and was officially released on 16 August. It was delayed in USA, due to distribution errors, and was finally released on 28 August 2009.

It also featured in an episode of Skins during James Cook's realisation of his actions and his subsequent trail conclousion and the end of the episode.

A follow-up, Heavy Drug (Surrender Sounds Mix): The Remixes, was released on 27 December 2009, with remixes from King Unique, Steve Mac and Future Beat Alliance.

A video contest for the song was officially revealed on UNKLE's blog.

== Track listing ==
=== Original ===
1. "Heavy Drug" (Surrender Sounds mix) – 8:19

=== Remixes ===
1. "Heavy Drug" (King Unique Smoke Nest mix) – 9:29
2. "Heavy Drug" (Steve Mac's Smacked Up mix) – 8:15
3. "Heavy Drug" (Steve Mac's Smacked Up dub) – 7:07
4. "Heavy Drug" (Future Beat Alliance remix) – 8:25
