= The X-Files: I Want to Believe (soundtrack) =

Soundtrack album by Mark Snow
- Released: July 22, 2008
- Genre: Soundtrack
- Labels: Decca Records; Fox Music

The X-Files: I Want to Believe – Original Motion Picture Soundtrack is an original film score composed and performed by Mark Snow for the motion picture The X-Files: I Want to Believe. It contains a remixed version of the theme tune by Unkle and one hip hop version by Xzibit.

== Track listing ==
The X-Files: I Want to Believe – Original Motion Picture Soundtrack was released on July 22, 2008.

No.	Title	Artist	Length
1.	"Moonrise"	Mark Snow	3:40
2.	"No Cures / Looking For Fox"	Mark Snow	2:50
3.	"The Trip to DC"	Mark Snow	3:48
4.	"Father Joe"	Mark Snow	1:31
5.	"What If You're Wrong / Sister"	Mark Snow	3:58
6.	"Ybara the Strange / Waterboard"	Mark Snow	2:25
7.	"Can't Sleep / Ice Field"	Mark Snow	2:34
8.	"March and Dig / Girl in the Box"	Mark Snow	4:57
9.	"A Higher Conscious"	Mark Snow	5:28
10.	"The Surgery"	Mark Snow	2:14
11.	"Good Luck"	Mark Snow	1:35
12.	"Seizure / Attempted Escape"	Mark Snow	1:54
13.	"Foot Chase"	Mark Snow	3:34
14.	"Mountain Montage / The Plow"	Mark Snow	1:44
15.	"Photo Evidence"	Mark Snow	2:46
16.	"The Preparation"	Mark Snow	1:35
17.	"Tranquilized"	Mark Snow	1:46
18.	"The Axe Post"	Mark Snow	2:53
19.	"Box Them"	Mark Snow	1:41
20.	"Home Again"	Mark Snow	4:17
21.	"X-Files (UNKLE Variation)"	Mark Snow	5:51
22.	"Broken"	UNKLE feat. Gavin Clark	4:43
23.	"Dying 2 Live"	Xzibit	4:03
Total length:			71:47

== Trust No One Documentary ==
The documentary included in the "Ultimate X-Phile Edition" of The X-Files: I Want To Believe DVD shows that some of the unusual sounds were created by a variation of silly putty and dimes tucked between and over the strings of the piano.

Mark Snow also comments that the fast percussion featured in some tracks was inspired by the track "Prospectors Quartet" from the There Will Be Blood soundtrack.
