= From Here on In (South album) =

Studio album by South
- Released: 26 March 2001
- Recorded: January–May 2000
- Genre: Alternative rock, post-Britpop
- Length: 70:10
- Label: Mo'Wax
- Producer: James Lavelle, Damian Taylor

South chronology
Overused (2000)	From Here on In (2001)	With the Tides (2003)

Singles from From Here on In
- 1. "Paint the Silence" Released: 5 March 2001; 2. "Keep Close" Released: 7 May 2001; 3. "All in for Nothing (Reprise)" Released: 8 January 2002 (U.S. only)

Professional ratings
Aggregate scores
Source	Rating
Metacritic	61/100
Review scores
Source	Rating
AllMusic	3/5 stars
NME	6/10
Pitchfork	6.9/10
PopMatters	mixed

From Here on In is the debut album by the English band South, released in 2001. The band subsequently released a US version the following year, complete with alternate artwork, and a slightly altered track list ("Too Much Too Soon" and "Save Your Sorrow" are new additions while "Broken Head III" and "Southern Climbs" are left off. "Broken Head II" closes the album).

The album spawned two singles in "Paint the Silence" and "Keep Close", along with a vinyl-only promo release of "Broken Head". "Paint the Silence" was featured on The O.C., and appeared on the compilation album Music from the OC: Mix 1.

== Track listing ==
=== UK version ===
1. "Broken Head I"
2. "Paint the Silence"
3. "Keep Close"
4. "I Know What You're Like"
5. "All in for Nothing (Reprise)"
6. "Here on In"
7. "Run on Time"
8. "Broken Head II"
9. "Sight of Me"
10. "By the Time You Catch Your Heart"
11. "Live Between the Lines (Back Again)"
12. "Recovered Now"
13. "Southern Climbs"
14. "By the Time You Catch Your Heart (Reprise)"
15. "All in for Nothing"
16. "Broken Head III"

=== US version ===
1. "Broken Head I"
2. "Paint the Silence"
3. "Keep Close"
4. "I Know What You're Like"
5. "All in for Nothing (Reprise)"
6. "Here on In"
7. "Run on Time"
8. "Sight of Me"
9. "By the Time You Catch Your Heart"
10. "Live Between the Lines (Back Again)"
11. "Save Your Sorrow"
12. "Too Much Too Soon"
13. "Recovered Now"
14. "By the Time You Catch Your Heart (Reprise)"
15. "All in for Nothing"
16. "Broken Head II"

== Release history ==
- 26 March 2001 – United Kingdom
- 19 February 2002 – United States
