= Adventures in the Underground Journey to the Stars =

Studio album by South
- Released: 4 April 2006
- Recorded: 2005
- Genres: Rock; Alternative rock Britpop
- Label: Young American

South chronology
With the Tides (2003)	Adventures in the Underground Journey to the Stars (2006)	You Are Here (2008)

Professional ratings
Aggregate scores
Source	Rating
Metacritic	66/100
Review scores
Source	Rating
Allmusic	3.5/5 stars
Pitchfork	(7.1/10)

Adventures in the Underground Journey to the Stars is the third album by English band South, released in 2006. The two singles were A Place in Displacement and Up Close And Personal.

== Track listing ==
1. "Shallow"
2. "Habit of a Lifetime"
3. "You Are One"
4. "Pieces of a Dream"
5. "Know Yourself"
6. "A Place in Displacement"
7. "Safety in Numbers"
8. "What Holds Us"
9. "Up Close and Personal"
10. "Meant to Mean"
11. "Flesh and Bone"
