= Be There (Unkle song) =

1998 single by Unkle featuring Ian Brown

Single by Unkle featuring Ian Brown

from the album Psyence Fiction
- B-side: "The Knock (On Effect)"
- Released: 8 February 1999
- Recorded: 1998; London, England
- Genre: Trip hop; alternative rock
- Length: 5:15
- Label: Mo' Wax; A&M
- Songwriters: Josh Davis; Ian Brown
- Producer: DJ Shadow

Unkle singles chronology
"Rabbit in Your Headlights" (1998)	"Be There" (1999)	"Narco Tourists" (2001)

Ian Brown singles chronology
"Can't See Me" (1998)	"Be There" (1999)	"Love Like a Fountain" (1999)

"Be There" is a song by British electronic group Unkle. It was produced by member DJ Shadow and written by him along with British musician Ian Brown, who is also featured in the song's vocals. The song is featured on 1999 bonus tracks editions of Psyence Fiction and was released as the second single from the album. The track is, essentially, a vocal version of the instrumental track "Unreal" from Psyence Fiction.

The song became Unkle's first major hit on any singles chart, peaking at number 8 on the UK Singles Chart and becoming the group's most commercially successful song. The UK Enhanced CD release of the single is notable in that across its three tracks, it features contributions from DJ Shadow, James Lavelle, The Stone Roses' Ian Brown, Oasis's Noel Gallagher, Radiohead's Thom Yorke, and The Beastie Boys' Mike D.

== Music video ==
Jake Scott directed the song's music video, which features a woman (played by Emma Griffiths Malin) at Mornington Crescent tube station.

== Track listing ==
UK 12" single (MW108)

1. "Be There" (featuring Ian Brown) – 5:16
2. "Be There" (Underdog Remix) – 5:30
3. "The Knock on Effect" (remix by Noel Gallagher) – 6:12

UK CD1 single (MW108CD1)

1. "Be There" (featuring Ian Brown) – 5:16
2. "Be There" (Underdog Remix) – 5:30
3. "Be There" (Underdog Instrumental) – 5:29

UK CD2 single (MW108CD2)

1. "Be There" (featuring Ian Brown; radio edit) – 4:22
2. "The Knock on Effect" (remix by Noel Gallagher) – 6:12
3. "Rabbit in Your Headlights" (Instrumental) – 5:59
4. "Rabbit in Your Headlights" (featuring Thom Yorke; Enhanced CD video) – 5:00

Japanese CD EP (TFCK-87973)

1. "Be There" (featuring Ian Brown) – 5:16
2. "Be There" (Underdog Remix) – 5:30
3. "Unreal" (KZA & Kent Remix) – 5:51 (mislabeled as "Be There" (KZA & Kent Remix))
4. "The Knock on Effect" (remix by Noel Gallagher) – 6:13
5. "The Knock" (Indopepsychics Remix) – 5:21
6. "Celestial Annihilation" (Dub Version) – 4:43
7. "Celestial Annihilation" (DJ Assault Remix) – 3:59
8. "Celestial Annihilation" (The Committee Remix) – 3:54

== Charts ==
Chart (1999)	Peak position
UK Singles Chart	8
