= With the Tides =

Studio album by South
- Released: 23 September 2003
- Studio: RAK Studios, London
- Genre: Alternative rock, post-Britpop
- Length: 42:55
- Label: Kinetic
- Producer: Dave Eringa

South chronology
From Here on In (2002)	With the Tides (2003)	Adventures in the Underground Journey to the Stars (2006)

Singles from With the Tides
- 1. "Loosen Your Hold" Released: 11 August 2003; 2. "Colours in Waves" Released: 22 March 2004; 3. "Motiveless Crime" Released: 2 August 2004

Professional ratings
Aggregate scores
Source	Rating
Metacritic	77/100
Review scores
Source	Rating
AllMusic	4/5 stars
Pitchfork	7.3/10
Slant Magazine	4/5 stars

With the Tides is the second studio album by English rock band South, originally released on Kinetic Records in 2003. It peaked at number 21 on the UK Independent Albums Chart.

== Track listing ==
No.	Title	Length
1.	"Motiveless Crime"	3:19
2.	"Colours in Waves"	4:02
3.	"Loosen Your Hold"	3:01
4.	"Natural Disasters"	3:46
5.	"Fragile Day"	4:51
6.	"9 Lives"	3:50
7.	"Same Old Story"	3:24
8.	"Mend These Trends"	3:38
9.	"Silver Sun"	3:30
10.	"Straight Lines to Bad Lands"	3:38
11.	"What I Find"	2:43
12.	"Threadbare"	3:13
Total length:		42:55

Japanese edition bonus tracks
No.	Title	Length
13.	"Too Much Too Soon"	3:33
14.	"Estimation"	2:32
Total length:		49:00

== Personnel ==
Credits adapted from liner notes.

South

- Joel Cadbury
- Jamie McDonald
- Brett Shaw

Additional musicians

- Dave Eringa – synthesizer, mellotron, organ
- Shaun Genocky – guitar, whistle
- Will Harper – Rhodes piano, bass guitar
- Sally Herbert – string arrangement, violin
- Jules Singleton – violin
- Dinah Beamish – cello
- Claire Orsler – viola
- Skaila Kanga – harp

Technical personnel

- Dave Eringa – production, mixing
- Shaun Genocky – co-production, mixing, engineering
- Howie Weinberg – mastering
- Dbox – art direction
- Laure Hughes – photography

== Charts ==
Chart	Peak position
UK Independent Albums (OCC)	21
