= Toydrum =

English musical duo

- Origin: England
- Years active: 2012–present
- Spinoff of: Unkle
- Members: Pablo Clements; James Griffith
- Website: toydrum.co.uk

Toydrum are a British musical duo consisting of Pablo Clements and James Griffith. Their work includes music for film and television and has received nominations for Emmy, BAFTA, and Ivor Novello awards.

== History ==
=== Formation ===
Pablo Clements and James Griffith met in 2007 while both were members of the electronic music group UNKLE. They left the group in 2012 and subsequently began working together as Toydrum. The duo's work has since focused primarily on composition and music production for film and television, alongside their own recorded music. Their studio, the Toy Rooms, is in Brighton, England.

=== Career ===
Toydrum's most notable television work includes the Apple TV+ series Slow Horses, for which they co-compose the score with Daniel Pemberton. The music for the third and fifth seasons received Emmy Award nominations for Outstanding Music Composition for a Series. The series' music has also received nominations at the BAFTA Television Awards and Ivor Novello Awards.

Other television credits include the Netflix sports documentary Untold: Vinnie Jones, the Disney+ music documentary Camden, the Amazon series Three Pines, the AMC science fiction drama Soulmates, the Sky and HBO thriller-comedy Two Weeks to Live, the ITV thriller Deep Water, which featured a title song recorded in collaboration with singer-songwriter Beth Orton, and the ITV dramas Tell Me Everything and Platform 7.

In film, Toydrum have collaborated with the director and actress Alice Lowe on the scores for Prevenge and Timestalker. Both soundtracks were released by Invada Records.

Other film credits include London Fields, Future World, A Guide to Second Date Sex, Sweetheart, The Banishing, and Detour, which was shortlisted for Best Score at the British Independent Film Awards.

Toydrum have also released music as recording artists, including the EP Distant Focus Vol. 1, which featured collaborations with artists including Gavin Clark, followed by the full-length album Evangelist. Music from Evangelist was used in the soundtracks of Shane Meadows' television series This Is England '90 and The Virtues.

Their subsequent releases include My Eye on You (To Reinvision), an album of reworked Gavin Clark songs featuring Nick Cave, Warren Ellis, and Trentemøller; and Fields of Madness, a collection of instrumental compositions featuring collaborations with Alex Maas from the Black Angels and James Bagshaw from Temples.

== Selected filmography ==
=== Television ===
Year	Title
2015	This Is England '90
2016–2024	The Grand Tour
2019	The Virtues
2019	Deep Water
2020	Two Weeks to Live
2020	Soulmates
2022–2024	Tell Me Everything
2022	Three Pines
2022–2026	Slow Horses
2023	Platform 7
2024	Camden
2026	Nocturne
TBA	El Gato

=== Film ===
Year	Title
2014	Montana
2016	Detour
2016	Prevenge
2018	Future World
2018	London Fields
2019	A Guide to Second Date Sex
2020	The Banishing
2021	Sweetheart
2024	Timestalker
2025	The Son and the Sea

== Discography ==
Albums

- Distant Focus Vol 1 (EP, 2014)
- Evangelist (2015)
- My Eye on You (To Reinvision) (2017)
- Fields of Madness (EP, 2018)

Contributions and appearances

- Noel Gallagher – Where the City Meets the Sky – Chasing Yesterday: The Remixes (2015)
