= The Time Has Come (EP) =

EP by Unkle
- Released: 1994
- Genre: Instrumental hip-hop
- Length: 42:39
- Label: Mo' Wax
- Producer: James Lavelle; Tim Goldsworthy; Masayuki Kudo

Unkle chronology
The Time Has Come (1994)	Psyence Fiction (1998)

The Time Has Come is the debut EP by Unkle, a music project consisting of James Lavelle, Tim Goldsworthy, and Masayuki Kudo. It was released in 1994 through Mo' Wax. It peaked at number 73 on the UK Albums Chart.

== Background ==
James Lavelle and Tim Goldsworthy started their collaboration in 1992 under the group name Men from Unkle. They were then joined by Masayuki Kudo. The trio's debut EP as Unkle, titled The Time Has Come, was released in 1994 through Mo' Wax. It includes remixes by Portishead, Howie B, and Plaid. The EP's cover art is a painting by the graffiti artist Futura 2000.

== Critical reception ==
Professional ratings
Review scores
Source	Rating
AllMusic	4/5 stars

Sean Cooper of AllMusic described the EP as "a sprawling bouillabaisse of influences, all impeccably arranged." He added, "Hip-hop, funk, and jazz are of course the most obvious, but the soundtracky deviations of ambient, as well as hitting electro-boogie and spy movie theme music (particularly on Portishead's remix) also figure in." R.J. Wheaton stated, "The Time Has Come is ponderous, bassy, moody, zany, soundtracky 1990s UK instrumental hip-hop, built from the crates of rare groove DJs."

== Track listing ==
All tracks are written by James Lavelle, Tim Goldsworthy, and Masayuki Kudo.

The Time Has Come track listing
No.	Title	Length
1.	"The Time Has Come" ('If You Find the Earth Boring': Unkle mix)	14:00
2.	"The Time Has Come" (Portishead plays Unkle mix)	4:22
3.	"The Time Has Come" (Howie B vs. Unkle mix)	10:46
4.	"The Time Has Come" ('Coffeehouse Conversation': Plaid mix)	5:19
5.	"The Time Has Come" ('Sassafrass': Plaid mix)	8:11
Total length:		42:39

== Personnel ==
Credits adapted from liner notes.

- James Lavelle – production
- Tim Goldsworthy – production
- Masayuki Kudo – production
- Portishead – remix (2)
- Howie B – remix (3)
- Plaid – remix (4, 5)
- Futura 2000 – artwork
- Ben Drury – design
- Will Bankhead – design

== Charts ==
Chart performance for The Time Has Come
Chart (1995)	Peak position
UK Albums (OCC)	73
UK R&B Albums (OCC)	10
