= Sunhouse (band) =

- Origin: London, England
- Genres: Folk
- Years active: 1997–1998
- Label: Independiente

Sunhouse was a British band, based in Burton upon Trent, which released two EPs and one CD album. The band consisted of Gavin Clark (vocals), Paul Bacon (guitar), Robert Brooks (bass) and Dominic Dillon (drums) with Tony Robinson and Oliver Jones supporting them onstage when during live performances. A year after their debut LP Crazy on the Weekend was released, the band split up.

Songwriter Gavin Clark originally met film director Shane Meadows when both were working at the Alton Towers leisure park. Several years later, Meadows contacted Clark to provide songs for the soundtrack to his low-budget film, Small Time. Clark quickly formed a band for the work, recruiting guitarist Paul Bacon and two former members of indie band the Telescopes, bass player Robert Brooks and drummer Dominic Dillon. The band signed a contract with Independiente Records and completed further soundtrack work for Meadows' feature-length debut, Twenty Four Seven. The limited edition Small Time EP and single "Monkey Dead", led them to the band's debut alnum, Crazy on the Weekend, which was released in 1998. Working with producer John Reynolds (Sinéad O'Connor), the band continued their practice of recording outside a studio environment. Their acoustic-based songs were augmented by washes of strings and organ, earning comparisons to Nick Drake, Tom Waits and Beth Orton.

Sunhouse's only album, Crazy on the Weekend had some critical success including a five star review in Uncut.

== Discography ==
- Crazy on the Weekend
