= Never, Never, Land =

Studio album by Unkle
- Released: 22 September 2003
- Genre: Trip hop; house; electronic rock
- Length: 66:00
- Label: Mo'Wax (2003); Global Underground (2004)
- Producer: James Lavelle; Richard File

Unkle chronology
Psyence Fiction (1998)	Never, Never, Land (2003)	Edit Music for a Film: Original Motion Picture Soundtrack Reconstruction (2005)

Alternative cover
- Cover of 2004 double-CD edition Never, Never, Land Revisited

Professional ratings
Aggregate scores
Source	Rating
Metacritic	66/100
Review scores
Source	Rating
AllMusic	3/5 stars
Blender	3/5 stars
Drowned in Sound	8/10
The Guardian	2/5 stars
Mojo	3.5/5 stars
Pitchfork	5.0/10
Rolling Stone	3/5 stars
Spin	B
Stylus	8.4/10
Under the Radar	4/10

Never, Never, Land is the second album by the British electronic music act UNKLE, released on 22 September 2003. On 24 October 2004 an expanded edition entitled Never, Never, Land Revisited was released. The original album debuted at No. 71 in Australia. It was promoted by four singles: "Eye for an Eye", "In a State", "Reign" and "Safe in Mind", which was released only as a 12" promo.

The tracks on the album contain audio samples from the movies The Prophecy, Jacob's Ladder, THX 1138 and The Thin Red Line. "Panic Attack" samples the beat from "She's Lost Control" and "Inside" samples the beat from "New Dawn Fades", both original songs by English post-punk band Joy Division.

== Track listing ==
1. "Back and Forth" – 0:54
2. "Eye for an Eye" – 5:45
3. "In a State" – 6:59
4. "Safe in Mind (Please Get This Gun From Out My Face)" (featuring Josh Homme) – 6:21
5. "I Need Something Stronger" (featuring Brian Eno and Jarvis Cocker) – 4:16
6. "What Are You to Me?" – 6:45
7. "Panic Attack" – 5:13
8. "Invasion" (featuring 3D) – 5:15
9. "Reign" (featuring Ian Brown and Mani) – 5:32
10. "Glow" (featuring Joel Cadbury of South) – 4:19
11. "Inside" – 8:20
12. "Awake the Unkind" (Japanese version bonus track) – 4:35
13. "Eye for an Eye Backwards" (Josh Homme & Alain Johannes Remix) (Never, Never, Land Revisited bonus track) – 6:23
14. "Safe in Mind (Please Get This Gun From Out My Face)" (Chris Goss Remix) (Never, Never, Land Revisited bonus track) – 4:45

=== Disc two of Never, Never, Land Revisited: Inside Out ===
1. "Blackout" – 6:50
2. "Tracier" – 2:09
3. "Panic Attack" (Ape Sounds Remix) – 6:08
4. "Reign" (Anagram - Psychonauts Remix) – 9:44
5. "In a State" (DFA Remix) – 11:59
6. "Invasion" (Medway Vs Eva Coast to Coast Remix) – 8:41
7. "Have You Passed through This Night?" (Remix of the track "Eye for an Eye") – 9:35
8. "Glow" (Hybrid Remix) – 7:58
9. "In a State" (Sasha Remix) – 11:04

== Miscellaneous ==
Some CD versions of the album feature a hidden track in the pregap. The track can be heard by playing the beginning of track one and then using the rewind/search button to go back 0:18.

The track "Glow" was used as one of the insert songs of the 2009 film Push starring Dakota Fanning.

== Samples ==
- "Back and Forth"
  - The narrator/voice of the first track is Street poet Robert Alan Weiser.
  - Black Sabbath – "Changes" (only appears in early leaked versions of the album, but readily available on public websites, e.g. YouTube)
- "Eye for an Eye"
  - The film The Prophecy (vocal sample: "Even now in heaven there were angels carrying savage weapons")
  - James Asher – "Fairground Ghost"
  - The Undisputed Truth – "Ball of Confusion"
  - The film The Thin Red Line (vocal samples: "Does it help the grass to grow? The sun to shine?", "Is this darkness in you too? Have you passed through this night?", "This great evil. Where's it come from?")
- "Safe in Mind"
  - The film Fallen (vocal sample: "I like the night. The street. The smells. The sense of another world. Sometimes you come face to face with yourself.")
- "I Need Something Stronger"
  - William Blake's Introduction, from Songs of Innocence and of Experience (poem, 1795)
  - The film THX 1138 (vocal sample: "what's wrong?" Nothing, really. I just, you know, i need something stronger", "Can you feel this? What is that buzzin'")
  - The film Jacob's Ladder (vocal sample: "It's just a matter of how you look at it, that's all")
- "Panic Attack"
  - Joy Division – "She's Lost Control"
  - Richard Pinhas – "Variation III Sur Le Theme De Bene Gesserit"
- "Reign"
  - "Scott Walker" – "Farmer in the City (Remembering Pasolini)"
- "Inside"
  - The film Jacob's Ladder (vocal sample: "The only thing that burns in hell is the part of you that won't let go of your life…")
  - Joy Division – "New Dawn Fades"
- "Blackout"
  - Hawkwind – "Motorhead"

== Charts ==
Chart (2003)	Peak position
Australian Albums (ARIA)	71
French Albums (SNEP)	82
Irish Albums (IRMA)	57
UK Albums (OCC)	24
US Top Dance Albums (Billboard)	6

== Certifications ==
Region	Certification	Certified units/sales
United Kingdom (BPI)	Silver	60,000^{*}
^{*} Sales figures based on certification alone.
