= Self Defence: Never, Never, Land Reconstructed and Bonus Beats =

Remix album by Unkle
- Released: 2006
- Label: Global Underground

Unkle chronology
Edit Music for a Film: Original Motion Picture Soundtrack Reconstruction (2005)	Self Defence: Never, Never, Land Reconstructed and Bonus Beats (2006)	War Stories (2007)

Self Defence: Never, Never, Land Reconstructed and Bonus Beats is a remix album by Unkle, released in 2006 by Global Underground. Spanning four discs, it is a compilation of remixes of tracks from the album Never, Never, Land, and also contains remixes of a track featuring Ian Astbury (The Cult) from the then-upcoming UNKLE album War Stories.

== Track listing ==
=== Disc 1 ===
1. "Burn My Shadow" (feat. Ian Astbury) (Junkie XL Mix)
2. "Burn My Shadow" (Aidan Lavelle 'Bells' Mix)
3. "Burn My Shadow" (Dan F Mix)
4. "What You Are To Me?" / Petter - "These Days" (Sasha's Involver Mix)
5. "Eye for an Eye" (Mode Mix)
6. "Eye for an Eye" (Meat Katie 'Twisted in the Globe' Mix)
7. "Eye for an Eye" (Meat Katie 'E-Type' Dub)
8. "Eye for an Eye" (Tyrant Mix)
9. "In A State" (Total Science Dub Mix)

=== Disc 2 ===
1. "In A State" / Moby - "God Moving Over the Face of the Waters"
2. "Reign" (feat. Ian Brown) (Evil Nine Mix)
3. "Reign" (Way Out West Instrumental Mix)
4. "Reign" (Trafik's Stoned Rose Mix)
5. "Reign" (Morgan Geist Mix)
6. "Reign" (Way Out West Mix)
7. "Reign" (Unkle Reconstruction)
8. "Reign" (Three AM 'Black Swan' Vocal Mix)

=== Disc 3 ===
1. "Back & Forth" (Secret Intro)
2. "I Need Something Stronger" (Dan F Mix)
3. "Reign" (Instrumental Mix)
4. "Invasion" (Medway Mix)
5. "Inside" (Dan F Mix)
6. "In A State" (Sasha Instrumental Mix)
7. "In A State" (Meat Katie Vs Elite Force Mix)
8. "In A State" (Total Science Vocal Mix)
9. "Eye for an Eye" (2 Sinners Mix)
10. "Eye for an Eye" (Dylan Rhymes Vs Force Mass Motion Mix)
11. "Eye for an Eye" (Swain & Snell Mix)
12. "Tracier"

=== Disc 4 ===
1. "Reign" (RJD2 Instrumental Mix)
2. "Reign" (Aidan Lavelle Mix)
3. "Reign" (Anagram Mix)
4. "Reign" (False Prophet Mix)
5. "Reign" (RJD2 Vocal Mix)
6. "In A State" (Sasha Mix)
7. "In A State" (DFA Mix Edit)
8. "Blackout"
9. "Panic Attack" (Ape Sounds Mix)
10. "Glow" (Hybrid Mix)
11. "Have You Passed Through This Night"

=== Disc 2 (U.S. Edition) ===
Note: Disc 2 of the U.S. Edition is missing "In A State / God Moving Over the Face of the Waters" and instead contains two different versions of "Reign" not found on other releases:

1. "Reign" (Original Version)
2. "Reign" (feat. Ian Brown) (Evil Nine Mix)
3. "Reign" (Way Out West Instrumental Mix)
4. "Reign" (Trafik 'Stoned Rows' Mix)
5. "Reign" (Morgan Geist Mix)
6. "Reign" (Way Out West Mix)
7. "Reign" (Unkle Reconstruction)
8. "Reign" (Three AM 'Black Swan' Vocal Mix)
9. "Reign" (Beat Pharmacy's Better To Reign in Hell Than To Serve in Heaven Mix)

Self Defence EP

=== Self Defence EP ===
A limited to 1000 copies Self Defence EP was also released as 12" vinyl, which included the following tracks:

1. "What You Are To Me?/These Days (Sasha-Involva Remix)" (as Unkle/Petter)
2. "I Need Something Stronger (DanF Remix)"
3. "Reign (Way Out West Instrumental)"
4. "Reign (Trafik's Stone Rose Remix)"

== Chart performance ==
Chart (2006)	Peak position
UK Dance Albums (OCC)	9
UK Independent Albums (OCC)	16
