= Jules Blattner =

American rock and roll singer and guitarist (1941–2019)

- Birth name: Jules Merrill Blattner
- Also known as: Seluj Renttalb
- Born: February 8, 1941; St. Louis, Missouri, U.S.
- Died: June 7, 2019 (aged 78); St. Louis, Missouri
- Genres: Rock and roll, rockabilly
- Occupations: Singer, guitarist, songwriter
- Instruments: Guitar
- Years active: 1956–2003

Jules Merrill Blattner (February 8, 1941 – June 7, 2019) was an American rock and roll singer, guitarist, songwriter and bandleader.

== Life and career ==
Born in St. Louis, Missouri, Blattner studied at Affton High School. He organized his first group, Jules Blattner and the Teen Tones, in 1956. Reputedly the first white rock and roll band in St. Louis, they performed regularly at high school dances and in local shows over the next few years. In 1959, Blattner recorded his first single, "Rock & Roll Blues", for the local Bobbin record label. Regarded by Bruce Eder at Allmusic as "a classic of late-era rockabilly", it reached the local charts but failed to break nationally. Blattner and his band supported stars such as Brenda Lee, the Isley Brothers and Little Richard when they did shows in the area, and he released a second single, "Teen Town", but again failed to achieve nationwide success.

In the early 1960s he recorded for the K-Ark label in Nashville, and changed the band name, first to the Twist Tones and then to the Jules Blattner Group. As resident bandleader at the Butterscotch Lounge in St Louis, he recorded his own song, "Butterscotch Twist", which was included on the compilation LP, A Musical Tour of Gaslight Square. Blattner also recorded several singles for the local Norman label, and released a version of Chuck Berry's "No Money Down" as a single on Coral Records. In 1965, he and his band recorded tracks in Chicago with Chuck Berry, which appeared on Berry's LP Chuck Berry in London. The songs included a reworking of "Butterscotch Twist", credited to Berry as "Butterscotch".

Blattner and his band performed regularly in St Louis, and in Hawaii during the winter season. He also recorded for the Tee Pee label. He relocated to California, and was recruited by the USO to perform in Vietnam, where his tour in early 1968 coincided with the Tet Offensive. After returning to the US, Blattner formed a new band in Wisconsin, which eventually took the name Jules Blattner and the Warren Groovy All-Star Band, and released several further singles on local labels. In 1971, the Jules Blattner Group released an album on Buddah Records, Call Me Man!, followed by Back On The Road Again in 1972. He also recorded a concept album The Mishtabula Maine Marching Band and Soil Salvation Society, credited to Seluj Renttalb (Blattner's name spelled backwards) and issued by MGM Records. The album is described as "a 'Sergeant Pepper' style release, complete with folk music influences and a talking children choir, for the flower power generation". Other albums followed, including Back to the Basics (1979).

After the commercial failure of his recordings, Blattner retired from music for several years, re-emerging in the 1980s as a live performer in the St Louis area, Florida and elsewhere. In 1992, he was voted Best Local Rock & Roll Artist in a newspaper poll, and released the album Jump On This. He retired from performing in 2003.

His early recordings were reissued on several compilations of rockabilly music, and in 2004 a compilation CD of his recordings was released by the German label Hydra.

Blattner died in 2019, aged 78, from amyotrophic lateral sclerosis.
