= Rabbit in Your Headlights =

Single by Unkle featuring Thom Yorke

from the album Psyence Fiction
- Released: October 12 1998
- Recorded: July 1997
- Genre: Trip hop
- Length: 6:18
- Label: Mo' Wax
- Songwriters: Thom Yorke; Josh Davis
- Producer: Unkle

"Rabbit in Your Headlights" is a song by the British electronic duo Unkle, released on their debut album, Psyence Fiction (1998). It features vocals from the Radiohead singer, Thom Yorke, who wrote it with the Unkle member Josh Davis. The music video, directed by Jonathan Glazer and starring Denis Lavant, was listed among the greatest by Rolling Stone and Pitchfork. Yorke has performed "Rabbit in Your Headlights" in solo shows and with his side project Atoms for Peace.

== Recording ==
Stereogum described "Rabbit in Your Headlights" as a "haunting deconstructed piano ballad ... a smoky jazz horror show". It was written by the Radiohead singer, Thom Yorke, and the Unkle member Josh Davis (also known as DJ Shadow), whose 1996 album Endtroducing influenced Radiohead's 1997 album OK Computer. It also contains dialogue sampled from the 1990 film Jacob's Ladder.

The Unkle member James Lavelle said Unkle originally intended to collaborate with Radiohead, but Yorke wanted to "do something completely different". According to Lavelle, after the success of OK Computer, Yorke was "able to slightly dissociate himself from what he needed to attain with Radiohead". Yorke recorded his vocals in California in 1997 while on tour with Radiohead.

== Music video ==
Denis Lavant in the music video

The music video was directed by Jonathan Glazer, who had directed the videos for Radiohead's singles "Street Spirit" and "Karma Police". Glazer was unsatisfied with his "Karma Police" video, saying he had "missed emotionally and dramatically". He made the "Rabbit in Your Headlights" video as a companion, and felt he achieved what he had failed to with "Karma Police".

The video stars Denis Lavant as a man walking along a road in a tunnel, muttering. He is struck by several cars, but gets to his feet. Eventually he removes his coat and walks shirtless. A car collides with him at speed; the man remains standing, his arms outstretched, and is engulfed in smoke.

Pitchfork wrote that the tunnel evoked the fatal car crash of Princess Diana the previous year and "walking toward the light at the end of one's life". In 2010, Pitchfork named it the eighth-greatest video of the 1990s, writing: "Pre-millennial tension rarely got this dark; technical accomplishments rarely this re-watchable." In 2021, Rolling Stone named the video the 28th-greatest of all time, writing that it was a "prime example of sustaining a sense of mounting dread and delivering an odd yet thrilling payoff" and that Glazer had "found that Venn diagram centre of creepy and ecstatic he'd been chasing".

== Legacy ==
In 2016, Pitchfork credited "Rabbit in Your Headlights" as a "turning point" for Yorke, placing his vocals in the context of experimental electronic music for the first time and foreshadowing Radiohead's 2000 album Kid A. Covering Psyence Fiction in Stereogum for its 20th anniversary, Chris Devile wrote of "Rabbit in Your Headlights": "That's a great music video, but the song is even more of an achievement ... 'Rabbit in Your Headlights' alone makes Psyence Fiction worth remembering."

Yorke performed "Rabbit in Your Headlights" with his side project Atoms for Peace on their 2013 tour, with the bassist, Flea, reciting the Jacob's Ladder dialogue. Yorke also performed it on his 2024 solo tour Everything.
