= Where Did the Night Fall =

Studio album by Unkle
- Released: 10 May 2010; 11 April 2011 (Another Night Out edition)
- Recorded: 2009–2010
- Genre: Electronic
- Length: 57:15
- Label: Surrender All

Unkle chronology
End Titles... Stories for Film (2008)	Where Did the Night Fall (2010)	The Road: Part 1 (2017)

Singles from Where Did the Night Fall
- 1. "Heavy Drug (Surrender Sounds Mix)" Released: 16 August 2009; 2. "Natural Selection" Released: 28 March 2010; 3. "Follow Me Down" Released: 13 June 2010

Professional ratings
Aggregate scores
Source	Rating
Metacritic	68/100
Review scores
Source	Rating
AllMusic	4/5 stars
Alternative Press	4/5 stars
Clash	7/10
Drowned in Sound	7/10
Mojo	3/5 stars
NME	3.5/5 stars
Pitchfork	5.9/10
Q	4/5 stars
Rolling Stone	3/5 stars
URB	3.5/5 stars

Where Did the Night Fall is the fourth studio album from British electronic music act Unkle, released on 10 May 2010.

== Background ==
As a documentation of the work on the album, on 13 April 2009, James Lavelle, Unkle's mastermind, started an official "UNKLE Blog". According to the first post, Lavelle started to work in studio in January 2009 with Pablo Clements, James Griffith, Joel Cadbury, Gavin Clark, Matt Pierce and Mike Lowry.

== Promotion ==
On 16 August 2009 a single, "Heavy Drug (Surrender Sounds Mix)", was made available digitally via Beatport and iTunes. On 27 December 2009 the download was followed by a remix EP with remixes by King Unique, Steve Mac and Future Beat Alliance.

On 11 February 2010 a song, "Natural Selection", appeared as a streaming on Spin magazine's website, and was later made available to download as a 320 kbit/s MP3 file, via UNKLE's official website. Beginning on 31 March, a Warm Digits remix of "Natural Selection" was made available for download to customers who had pre-ordered "Where Did the Night Fall" on UNKLE's online store.

Available on the UNKLE website was a 2 disc limited edition of the album, which included a second disc containing instrumental versions of all the songs.

== Where Did the Night Fall – Another Night Out ==
On 9 February 2011, UNKLE revealed that Where Did the Night Fall would be re-released as Where Did the Night Fall – Another Night Out. The first disc will contain the same songs that are on the original album but the second disc contains material from two of UNKLE's previous EPs, plus a number of exclusive and rare tracks. It was released on 11 April 2011.

The standard edition comes packaged as a double jewel case with a 16-page booklet. The limited edition comes in a gold outer slipcase featuring a fully re-worked 16-page board book and 32-page booklet with new exclusive shots from the original photo shoot with Warren Du Preez and Nick Thornton Jones.

== Track listing ==
=== Standard ===
1. "Nowhere" – 0:40
2. "Follow Me Down" (featuring Sleepy Sun) – 4:23
3. "Natural Selection" (featuring The Black Angels) – 4:10
4. "Joy Factory" (featuring Autolux) – 3:59
5. "The Answer" (featuring Big in Japan) – 4:40
6. "On a Wire" (featuring ELLE J) – 4:52
7. "Falling Stars" (featuring Gavin Clark) – 5:48
8. "Heavy Drug" – 1:13
9. "Caged Bird" (featuring Katrina Ford of Celebration) – 5:08
10. "Ablivion" – 4:29
11. "The Runaway" (featuring ELLE J) – 3:45
12. "Ever Rest" (featuring Joel Cadbury of South) – 4:21
13. "The Healing" (featuring Gavin Clark) – 4:27
14. "Another Night Out" (featuring Mark Lanegan) – 5:12
15. "Close Your Eyes" (featuring ELLE J) – 5:25 (available on the Australian edition)

=== Limited edition ===
1. "Nowhere (Instrumental)" – 4:10
2. "Follow Me Down (Instrumental)" – 4:23
3. "Natural Selection (Instrumental)" – 4:10
4. "Joy Factory (Instrumental)" – 3:59
5. "The Answer (Instrumental)" – 4:40
6. "On a Wire (Instrumental)" – 4:52
7. "Falling Stars (Instrumental)" – 5:48
8. "Heavy Drug (Instrumental)" – 4:24
9. "Caged Bird (Instrumental)" – 5:08
10. "Ablivion (Instrumental)" – 4:29
11. "The Runaway (Instrumental)" – 3:45
12. "Ever Rest (Instrumental)" – 4:21
13. "The Healing (Instrumental)" – 4:27
14. "Another Night Out (Instrumental)" – 5:12

=== Another Night Out ===
1. "Somewhere" – 1:12
2. "In My Mind" (featuring Gavin Clark) – 4:44
3. "Money and Run" (featuring Nick Cave) – 5:16
4. "The Dog Is Black" (featuring Liela Moss) – 5:03
5. "Only the Lonely" (Over Dub) – 4:27
6. "Wash the Love Away" (featuring Gavin Clark) – 5:12
7. "Sunday Song" (featuring Rachel Fannan) – 6:46
8. "With You in My Head" (featuring The Black Angels) – 5:11
9. "Country Tune" (featuring Gavin Clark) – 5:16
10. "Not a Sound" – 5:15
11. "When the Lights Go Out/We Own the Night" – 5:36
12. "Every Single Prayer" (featuring Gavin Clark) – 5:13
13. "Forever" (featuring Ian Astbury) – 4:26 (Available on the Australian and Japanese Edition)

== Personnel ==
Adapted from AllMusic.

=== Unkle ===
- James Lavelle – art direction, editing, backing vocals
- Pablo Clements – drum engineering, editing, engineering, keyboards, programming, synthesizer, vocal engineering

=== Featured artists ===
- Aidan Lavelle – additional production, engineering, keyboards, mixing production, piano, programming, synthesizer
- Penny Ainscow – violin
- Sam Aylward – violin
- Chris Goss – associate producer, guitar, keyboards, synthesizer, backing vocals
- Dave Bateman – additional production, bass, engineering, keyboards, synthesizer
- Sam Bell – drum programming
- Joshua Blanchard – vocal engineering
- Christian Bland – organ
- Joshua Block – drums
- Freddie Bols – trumpet
- Jules Buckley – orchestral arrangements, string arrangements
- Joel Cadbury – bass, guitar, keyboards, piano, synthesizer, vocals, backing vocals
- Gavin Clark – vocals, backing vocals
- Nozomi Cohen – viola
- Nicki Davenport – Double bass
- Elle. J – vocals, backing vocals
- Katrina Ford – vocals
- Graham Fox – drums
- Mark Grainger – tuba
- James Griffith – additional production, bass, engineering, guitar, keyboards, piano, programming, synthesizer, backing vocals
- Alan Hardiman – trombone
- Steven Haynes – trombone
- Heritage Orchestra – brass, orchestral arrangements, orchestra production, string arrangements, strings
- Laura Holt – viola
- Sam Jacobs – French horn
- Simon James – keyboards, synthesizer
- Nat Jones – violin
- Mark Lanegan – vocals
- Jennymay Logan – violin
- Michael Lowry – drums, backing vocals
- Alex Maas – vocals
- Kit Massey – violin
- Andrew McCormack – string arrangements
- Mike Pelanconi – drum engineering
- Matthew Pierce – Fender Rhodes, keyboards, synthesizer, vocals
- Ruston Pomeroy – violin
- Rhian Porter – cello
- Tom Richards – orchestral arrangements
- Ben Trigg – cello
- Rachel Williams – vocals
- Mark Wood – French Horn
- Steven Young – bass
- Tim Young – keyboards, synthesizer, backing vocals

==== Autolux ====
- Carla Azar – drums, engineering, percussion, vocals
- Eugene Goreshter – bass
- Greg Edwards – bass, engineering, omnichord, vocals

==== Sleepy Sun ====
- Brian Tice – drums

=== Production ===
- Joseph Bennett – set design
- Zowie Broach – costume design
- Steve "Dub" Jones – mixing
- Danielle Epworth – make-Up assistant
- Warren Du Preez – art direction, photography
- Kiera Gormley – model
- Dan Goudie – Pro-Tools, vocal engineer
- Leonie Edwards Jones – producer
- Jerome Hunt – assistant photographer
- Kyle Hunt – vocal engineer
- Soichi Inagaki – assistant hair stylist
- Brian Kirkby – costume design
- Nick Thornton Jones – art direction, photography
- Mike Marsh – mastering
- Alex Box – make-up
- Sebastian Lewsley – engineer, vocal engineer
- Maike Ludenbach – model
- Rob Riley – engineer
- Raphael Salley – hair stylist
- Lindsey Thurlow – producer
- Ameena Kara Callender – assistant hair stylist
- Ben Drury – art direction, design, lettering
- Steve Wright – engineer
- Eric Weaver – vocal engineer
- Chris Wheeler – orchestra production
- Nicole Stillman – assistant photographer
- Laurence Aldridge – Pro-Tools
- Sean Antanaitis – engineer, vocal engineer

== Charts ==
Chart (2010)	Peak position
Australian Albums (ARIA)	67
Belgian Albums (Ultratop Flanders)	73
Belgian Albums (Ultratop Wallonia)	68
French Albums (SNEP)	102
Irish Albums (IRMA)	81
Scottish Albums (OCC)	43
Swiss Albums (Schweizer Hitparade)	94
UK Albums (OCC)	42
UK Album Downloads (OCC)	33
UK Dance Albums (OCC)	1
UK Independent Albums (OCC)	1
US Top Dance Albums (Billboard)	7
