= Power Struggle =

2000 Single by Sunna

Single by Sunna

from the album One Minute Science
- Released: 23 October 2000
- Length: 12:59
- Label: Astralwerks, Virgin Records
- Songwriter(s): Jon Harris and Ian MacLaren

Sunna singles chronology
""O.D""	"Power Struggle"	""I'm Not Trading""

"Power Struggle" is a song by the British band Sunna from the 2000 album, One Minute Science.

== Music video ==
The video begins in an old abandoned house and inside were a large swarm of honeybees surrounding the house and Sunna appears playing throughout. At the next moment, a red car appears and a woman got out along with her groceries being carried. When she looks at the house, bees are flying everywhere and heads back to the car, grabbing her keys from her pocket but fallen after she was supposed to start her car. The bees are surrounding the car and the woman was still inside only to realize the bees are about to attack her. The video ends with the same shot of the house but included a dead beekeeper and an open jar that contains honey.

== Track listing ==
1. "Power Struggle (Album Version)" - 4:02
2. "Guinea Pig People" - 3:00
3. "Weather Controller" - 5:57

== Chart positions ==
Year	Chart	Position	Weeks
2000	UK Charts	81	1

== In media ==
The song is in Hollow Man when Sebastian is driving to work.
