= Gavin Clark =

English musician (1969–2015)

- Born: 25 January 1969
- Died: 16 February 2015 (aged 46)
- Occupation: Musician
- Formerly of: Sunhouse; Clayhill; UNKLE

Gavin Clark (25 January 1969 – 16 February 2015) was an English musician. He was a member of groups including Sunhouse, Clayhill and UNKLE.

Clark was a long term friend of director Shane Meadows, they met in 1989 at a Manchester house party when working at Alton Towers amusement park. Meadows asked Clark to score his debut feature Small Time in 1996 with film producer and drummer Dominic Dillon. Clark's work subsequently appeared in each of Meadow's films. Actor Paddy Considine, another friend of Meadows, was briefly in a band with Clark.

Clark and Dillon went on to form the group Sunhouse with guitarist Paul Bacon and bassist Rob Brooks. Sunhouse released one album, the critically acclaimed Crazy on the Weekend in 1998 but split in 1999. Clark then went on to form the band Clayhill in 2003 with guitarist Ted Barnes and bassist Ali Friend. They released a number of EPs and three albums before splitting in 2007.

Clark had more or less given up music by then and was considering working as a pizza delivery man. With the support of long term friend Meadows, who showcased his work in the 2007 documentary The Living Room, Clark began working again. Notably several appearances on albums by UNKLE including End Titles... Stories for Film in 2008 and Where Did the Night Fall in 2010.

Clark, who had struggled with alcoholism, died in February 2015 due to breathing complications associated with the illness.

The album Evangelist, featuring his last recordings, was released in October 2015. Incomplete, the songs were finished with the help of James Griffiths (UNKLE/TOYDRUM) and Pablo Clements (UNKLE/TOYDRUM) at the Toy Room Studios, Brighton. The album is loosely based on the singer's life and includes guest appearances by Warren Ellis and Ludovico Einaudi.

== Selected discography ==
=== Sunhouse ===
- Crazy on the Weekend (CBS, 1998)

=== Clayhill ===
- Grasscutter EP (Eat Sleep Records, 2004)
- Cuban Green EP (Eat Sleep Records, 2004)
- Small Circle (Eat Sleep Records, 2004)
- Acoustic (Eat Sleep Records, 2005)
- Mine at Last (Eat Sleep Records, 2006)
- Halfway Across Single (Eat Sleep Records, 2007)

=== Gavin Clark ===
- Somers Town OST (Not on label, 2008)
- Beautiful Skeletons (Club AC30, 2014)

=== TOYDRUM ===
- Evangelist (Underscore Collective, 2015)
