= I'm Not Trading =

2001 song performed by Sunna

Single by Sunna

from the album One Minute Science
- Released: 12 March 2001
- Length: 3:50
- Label: Astralwerks, Virgin Records
- Songwriter(s): Neil Davidge, John Harris, Ian MacLaren

Sunna singles chronology
"Power Struggle"	"I'm Not Trading"

"I'm Not Trading" is a song by the British industrial music/hard rock band Sunna with an unorthodox '5' beat time signature.

== Track listing ==
1. "I'm Not Trading" - 3:50
2. "Grave (Live In Chicago)" - 4:06
3. "I'm Not Trading (UNKLE - In Utero)" - 4:11

=== Bonus tracks ===
1. "I'm Not Trading (Radio Edit)" - 3:38 (United States Bonus track)

== Chart positions ==
Chart (2001)	Peak position
UK Singles (OCC)	94
