= Edit Music for a Film: Original Motion Picture Soundtrack Reconstruction =

Remix album by Unkle
- Released: 4 July 2005
- Recorded: 2005
- Genres: Electronic; dub
- Length: CD1: 58:30; CD2: 66:55
- Label: UNKLE Sounds

Unkle chronology
Never, Never, Land (2003)	Edit Music for a Film: Original Motion Picture Soundtrack Reconstruction (2005)	Self Defence: Never, Never, Land Reconstructed and Bonus Beats (2006)

Edit Music for a Film: Original Motion Picture Soundtrack Reconstruction is a two-disc UNKLE remix album/sound collection mixing together various musical styles, movie soundbites and UNKLE production. This was done for the 'After Dark' event in the ICA, London. James Lavelle put together a mix of soundtracks from films that inspired him the most. As the album notes point out: 2001: A Space Odyssey, Dune, Dog Day Afternoon, Kill Bill, Sexy Beast, Training Day, and Blade Runner amongst others.

The first disc Widescreen Edit – A New Hope, which is taken from the first original Star Wars film Star Wars Episode IV: A New Hope, and mainly focuses on inventive usage of film dialogue and scores. The second disc Bonus Material Edit – Strikes Back, which is likely a contraction of the second made Star Wars film The Empire Strikes Back, focuses more on rhythm and long stretches of film-inspired "dance" music without the heavy inventiveness of the previous disc.

== Track listing ==
=== Disc 1: Widescreen Edit – A New Hope ===
1. 20th Century Fox Logo
2. Unkle Vs. The Lox Feat. DMX & Lil' Kim Vs. Joe Budden - Intro/Money, Power, Respect/Focus
3. THX Deep Note
4. 2001: A Space Odyssey Sample
5. Richard Strauss – Also Sprach Zarathustra (Main Theme) (UNKLESounds Edit)
6. 2001: A Space Odyssey Sample
7. Unkle - Blackout with Dune samples.
8. Unkle - Lonely Souls Vs. Massive Attack - End Titles (Welcome To Sarajevo soundtrack)
9. A Clockwork Orange Sample
10. Wendy Carlos - Title Music From A Clockwork Orange
11. Massive Attack Feat. Mos Def - I Against I
12. Genuine Childs - Scarface DVD Menu Score
13. Tonight's Presentation (Kill Bill Sample)
14. DJ Shadow Feat. Roots Manuva Vs. Tomoyasu Hotei - GDMFSOB (Unkle Uncensored Mix)/Battle Without Honor or Humanity
15. Nellee Hooper Feat. Justin Warfield - The Montague Boys/O Verona
16. Eyes Wide Shut Sample
17. Chris Isaak - Baby Did a Bad Bad Thing (UNKLEsounds Edit)
18. Sid Vicious - My Way
19. Vangelis - Blush Response (UNKLEsounds Edit)
20. Unkle Vs. Dillinja - Safe In Mind/Angels Fell
21. THX 1138 Sample
22. Unkle - I Need Something Stronger
23. The Jud Conlon Chorus and The Mellomen - The Second Star to the Right

=== Disc 2: Bonus Material Edit – Strikes Back ===
1. MGM Sample
2. Lost In Translation Sample
3. 2010 Sample
4. Unkle - Eye For An Eye (Strings Section)
5. Unkle & South - Cocaine and Camcorders (UNKLE variation)
6. Unkle & South - Paranoid (UNKLE variation)
7. Thomas Bangalter - Night Beats
8. The Thin Red Line Sample
9. Unkle - Have You Passed Through This Night?
10. Dylan Rhymes - Assault on Precinct 13 - The Way/Radio Spot
11. Solaris Sample
12. Meat Katie Vs. Cliff Martinez - Next Life/Is That What Everybody Wants?
13. Uma Thurman - A Few Words From the Bride
14. Nancy Sinatra - Bang Bang (My Baby Shot Me Down) (UNKLEsounds Edit)
15. Alive Sample
16. Unkle Vs. Moby - In a State/God Moving Over the Face of the Waters
17. Elton John - Tiny Dancer (UNKLEsounds edit)
18. Outro - Scarface Restaurant Scene
