= Psyence Fiction =

Studio album by Unkle
- Released: 24 August 1998
- Recorded: August 1996 – 1998
- Studios: The Site (San Rafael); Record Plant (Hollywood); Strongroom (London); Milo (London); CTS (London)
- Genres: Trip hop; alternative rock
- Length: 54:59
- Label: Mo' Wax
- Producer: Unkle

Unkle chronology
Psyence Fiction (1998)	Never, Never, Land (2003)

Singles from Psyence Fiction
- 1. "Rabbit in Your Headlights" Released: 12 October 1998; 2. "Be There" Released: 8 February 1999

Psyence Fiction is the debut studio album by English electronic music act Unkle, released on 24 August 1998 by Mo' Wax. The album was produced by Unkle, at the time consisting of James Lavelle and DJ Shadow. The music on Psyence Fiction was primarily composed by DJ Shadow, while Lavelle recruited numerous guest musicians to contribute to the album's recording.

== Background and recording ==
Unkle started planning their debut album in 1995. A month of recording in Los Angeles produced 15 finished tracks, but apart from "Berry Meditation", which would be issued as a non-album single, Unkle founder James Lavelle scrapped the tracks, finding them unrepresentative of his vision for the project. In August 1996, Unkle, by now composed of Lavelle and DJ Shadow, began production on the material that would ultimately appear on Psyence Fiction. Inspired by The Verve's 1995 album A Northern Soul, Lavelle wished to move Unkle in a more song-oriented musical direction: "My frustration was that I didn't want to make weird instrumental hip hop records. We could've easily achieved that but I wanted songs. Listening to Richard Ashcroft was a revelation because I thought, 'If I could bring that ilk of singer in with what I was hearing from Shadow I'll crack it'." Unkle recorded "Lonely Soul", a collaboration with Verve lead singer Ashcroft, in September 1996.

In July 1997, Unkle worked on "Rabbit in Your Headlights" with Thom Yorke, who performed vocals on the song. It was originally intended as a collaboration with Yorke's band Radiohead, but Yorke saw the track as an opportunity "to do something completely different" from his band's music, according to Lavelle. In August, Alice Temple recorded vocals for "Bloodstain", and French musician Atlantique, a friend and early collaborator of Lavelle's, recorded vocals and music for "Chaos". The following month, Mark Hollis of Talk Talk contributed piano to "Chaos", while Wil Malone arranged and conducted strings for "Lonely Soul" and "Celestial Annihilation". Unkle recorded "Guns Blazing (Drums of Death Part 1)" in October with Kool G Rap, who was the only guest performer on Psyence Fiction selected by DJ Shadow rather than Lavelle. Badly Drawn Boy, whom Lavelle at one point considered recruiting as Unkle's lead singer on the album, recorded vocals for "Nursery Rhyme / Breather" in February 1998. In February and March, Unkle recorded "The Knock (Drums of Death Part 2)", with Mike D of the Beastie Boys performing vocals and Jason Newsted of Metallica playing bass guitar and theremin on the track.

The individual tracks on Psyence Fiction were recorded at different studios in California and London. Vocals were recorded at The Site in San Rafael, the Record Plant in Hollywood, and the London studios Strongroom and Milo, while strings were recorded at CTS in London. The tracks were likewise mixed at different studios, including the Record Plant, Strongroom, and the London facilities Metropolis, RAK, and Matrix.

== Release ==
Psyence Fiction was widely anticipated by music journalists and audiences, particularly due to its high-profile cast of musical collaborators. Given DJ Shadow's prominent role in its production, it was viewed as a de facto follow-up to his debut album Endtroducing....., which had been released in 1996 to widespread acclaim. Psyence Fiction was released in the United Kingdom on 24 August 1998 by Lavelle's label Mo' Wax. It peaked at number four on the UK Albums Chart. In the United States, it was released by Mo' Wax and London Records on 29 September 1998, reaching number 107 on the Billboard 200 and topping the Heatseekers Albums chart. London Records executives were satisfied with the album's American sales, though DJ Shadow was disappointed by its Billboard 200 chart peak.

"Rabbit in Your Headlights" was issued as the first single from Psyence Fiction on 12 October 1998. "Be There", a remix of the instrumental track "Unreal" featuring newly recorded vocals by Ian Brown, was released as the album's second single on 8 February 1999, peaking at number eight on the UK Singles Chart. Too weary to commit to further touring, and with his partnership with Lavelle having grown strained, DJ Shadow left Unkle during the promotional cycle for the album.

== Critical reception ==
Professional ratings
Review scores
Source	Rating
AllMusic	4/5 stars
Entertainment Weekly	B+
The Guardian	3/5 stars
Mixmag	5/5 stars
NME	6/10
Pitchfork	9.8/10
Q	4/5 stars
Rolling Stone	4.5/5 stars
Select	4/5
Spin	8/10

At the time of the album's release, various critics opined that Psyence Fiction failed to live up to its hype. NME reviewer John Mulvey wrote that DJ Shadow's music "rarely gels with Lavelle's chosen singers or even comes to terms with the song (as opposed to groove) format of much of the material". Caroline Sullivan of The Guardian said that while the album successfully sustains its "foreboding" mood, "its strength is also its weakness: somewhere amid the sprawl of bad dreams it turns into nothing more than meandering tunes with spooky keyboards attached." The A.V. Club's Joshua Klein criticised Unkle's decision to eschew hip hop for a "more conventional alt-rock outline", concluding that "Psyence Fiction can be chalked up as an ambitious failure; its principals can put it on their résumés, but cultural historians needn't put in their books." Critic Robert Christgau awarded the album a "one-star honorable mention", deeming it "not beautiful (or weird) enough for its own beats".

Among more positive reviews, Dorian Lynskey raved in Mixmag that Psyence Fiction demonstrates that dance music "can use rock vocalists, guitars and orchestras without losing its sense of otherness" and "be dark and expansive without becoming self-important". Barry Walters of Spin found the music "chaotic but never overwhelming" and described the album as "the illest soundclash since the last time a b-boy crashed a George Romero film festival and refused to turn off his boom-box". In Rolling Stone, Lorraine Ali called it "neither a lofty concept album nor the sonic equivalent of cinema", but concluded that "it is Shadow and Lavelle's striving for such greatness that makes Unkle a compelling work in progress." Entertainment Weekly critic David Browne wrote that the album's best songs "are like a soundtrack for a surreal, melancholy art film that exists in Shadow's and Lavelle's heads", while Gareth Grundy of Select said that "Shadow's signature production provides Psyence Fiction with coherence", and that Unkle's vision is "thrillingly realised" throughout.

== Legacy ==
In 2003, Lavelle stated that the hype surrounding Psyence Fiction had overshadowed its musical content, and that he felt it was released at a time "when people wanted [him] to fail." DJ Shadow said in 2010 that he viewed the album fondly despite finding it "somehow flawed."

In the years since the release of Psyence Fiction, "its stature has grown", according to The Age. AllMusic editor Stephen Thomas Erlewine wrote that the album "gains momentum on repeated listens" due to "Shadow's imagination and unpredictable highlights", calling it "a superstar project that doesn't play it safe and actually has its share of rich, rewarding music." In a retrospective piece for The Vinyl Factory, Eliot Wilder expressed similar sentiments and noted that Psyence Fiction had "gained cult status for its chaotic collages and maverick collaborations", adding that "it feels today like the kind of crazy, alt-star-strewn mash fest that it is." Chris DeVille of Stereogum said that it foreshadowed music by "likeminded ecumenical collectives like Gorillaz and Handsome Boy Modeling School", and that "in terms of quality alone, it's worthy of remembering as one of the best albums of its era." Psyence Fiction was included in lists of the best trip hop albums by Fact (at number 45) and Slant Magazine (at number nine).

In June 2013, Mo' Wax launched a Kickstarter campaign titled "Urban Archaeology: 21 Years of Mo'Wax", part of which included a deluxe CD re-release of Psyence Fiction. As of late 2020, the Psyence Fiction album has not been released to the campaign's contributors.

== Track listing ==
No.	Title	Writer(s)	Length
1.	"Guns Blazing (Drums of Death Part 1)"	Josh Davis; Nathaniel Wilson	5:01
2.	"Unkle Main Title Theme"	Davis	3:24
3.	"Bloodstain"	Davis; Alice Temple	5:57
4.	"Unreal"	Davis; Jules Blattner	5:10
5.	"Lonely Soul"	Davis; Richard Ashcroft; Wil Malone	8:56
6.	"Getting Ahead in the Lucrative Field of Artist Management"		0:56
7.	"Nursery Rhyme / Breather"	Davis; Damon Gough	4:45
8.	"Celestial Annihilation"	Davis; Malone	4:44
9.	"The Knock (Drums of Death Part 2)"	Davis; Michael Diamond	3:58
10.	"Chaos"	Atlantique Khanh	4:42
11.	"Rabbit in Your Headlights"	Davis; Thom Yorke	6:20
12.	"Outro (Mandatory)"		1:06
Total length:			54:59

Japanese edition and Australian limited edition bonus tracks
No.	Title	Writer(s)	Note	Length
0.	"Intro (Optional)"		CD Pregap, Hidden track	2:19
13.	"Guns Blazing (Drums of Death Part 1)" (instrumental)	Davis		4:00
14.	"The Knock (Drums of Death Part 2)" (instrumental)	Davis		3:52
Total length:				65:10

2003 reissue bonus track
No.	Title	Writer(s)	Length
13.	"Be There" (featuring Ian Brown)	Davis; Blattner; Brown	5:15
Total length:			60:14

== Sample credits ==
Adapted from liner notes.

- "Bloodstain" contains samples of "Alone", performed by BeBe K'Roche.
- "Unreal" and "Be There" contain samples of "Birth", written by Jules Blattner and performed by The Jules Blattner Group; and "Pre-Dawn Retrospective Chant", performed by Steve Forman.
- "Celestial Annihilation" is based on "Concerto for Strings and Beats", written by Wil Malone.

== Personnel ==
Credits are adapted from the album's liner notes.

Unkle

- DJ Shadow – music, scratching, recording
- James Lavelle – recording, breathing on "Nursery Rhyme / Breather"

Additional musicians

- Richard Ashcroft – vocals on "Lonely Soul"
- Atlantique – vocals and music on "Chaos"
- Badly Drawn Boy – vocals on "Nursery Rhyme / Breather"
- Mark Hollis – piano on "Chaos" (uncredited)
- Kool G Rap – vocals on "Guns Blazing (Drums of Death Part 1)"
- Lateef the Truthspeaker – additional vocals on "Guns Blazing (Drums of Death Part 1)"
- The London Session Orchestra – strings on "Lonely Soul" and "Celestial Annihilation"
- Lyrics Born – additional vocals on "Guns Blazing (Drums of Death Part 1)"
- Wil Malone – string arrangements and conducting on "Lonely Soul" and "Celestial Annihilation"
- Mike D – vocals on "The Knock (Drums of Death Part 2)"
- Jason Newsted – bass guitar and theremin on "The Knock (Drums of Death Part 2)"
- Alice Temple – vocals on "Bloodstain"
- Thom Yorke – vocals on "Rabbit in Your Headlights"

Production

- Unkle – production, recording
- Jim Abbiss – mixing, recording
- Sie Medway-Smith – recording
- Kevin Scott – recording

Design

- Will Bankhead – photography
- Ben Drury – sleeve design
- Tim Drury – grid design
- Futura 2000 – cover artwork, painting, character design
- Andy Holmes – sleeve design (assistance)
- Ryan Murphy – photography
- David Murray – character wire-frame design (assistance)
- Ali Peck – photography (assistance)
- Derek Waters – character wire-frame design

== Charts ==
Chart (1998)	Peak position
Australian Albums (ARIA)	15
Belgian Albums (Ultratop Flanders)	22
Dutch Albums (Album Top 100)	60
European Top 100 Albums (Music & Media)	28
French Albums (SNEP)	39
German Albums (Offizielle Top 100)	77
New Zealand Albums (RMNZ)	33
Norwegian Albums (VG-lista)	18
Scottish Albums (Official Charts)	7
UK Albums (Official Charts)	4
UK Dance Albums (OCC)	1
UK Independent Albums (Official Charts)	1
US Billboard 200	107
US Heatseekers Albums (Billboard)	1

=== Year-end charts ===
1998 year-end chart performance for Psyence Fiction
Chart (1998)	Position
UK Albums (OCC)	130

== Certifications ==
Region	Certification	Certified units/sales
United Kingdom (BPI)	Gold	100,000^{^}
^{^} Shipments figures based on certification alone.
