= Sunna (band) =

- Origin: Bristol, England, United Kingdom
- Genres: Hard rock, industrial rock
- Years active: 1998–present
- Labels: Astralwerks, Virgin Records 2000–2002

Sunna are a hard rock and industrial rock band from Bristol, England. They released their third album, After the Third Pin on 3 October 2011.

== History ==
The band toured with VAST and A Perfect Circle in 2000, as well as The Smashing Pumpkins on their final European tour. They released their debut album One Minute Science on Massive Attack's Melankolic label that year, along with the singles "O.D" and "Power Struggle". The latter single appeared in the movie Hollow Man. The third single from One Minute Science, "I'm Not Trading", was released in early 2001.

Drummer Richie Mills left the band in spring of 2001; he would have been replaced by Mark Richardson of Skunk Anansie, but Richardson joined Feeder instead following the death of that band's drummer Jon Lee.

Jon Harris released their second album, Two Minute Terror, in October 2009.

On 10 January 2011, Sunna announced a new album, titled After the Third Pin was in the works, and was scheduled to be released October.The album was released on 6 October 2011.

The fourth album 4 Global Mourning was released on 27 November 2013; after a phase of crowd funding.

== Members ==
=== Current members ===
- Jon Harris: vocals, guitar
- Alex Clemetson: (bass guitar)
- Leon Hunt: (rhythm and lap steel guitars, banjo)
- Josh Clark (drums, electronic percussion)
- Sid Harris (guitars)
- Jason Leverette (keyboards, samples, guitar, programming)

=== Past members ===
- Flatline (Mark Cahill): DJ (2000–2002)
- Richie Mills: drums (2000–2001)
- Mark Richardson: drums (2001–2002)
- Shane-O (Shane Goodwin): bass (2000–2001)
- Jim Harris: bass (2001–2002)
- Tim Harris: drums (1996–2000)
- Ian MacLaren: lead guitar

== Discography ==
Album	Date	Chart position
One Minute Science	15 August 2000	151
Two Minute Terror	6 October 2009	
After the Third Pin	6 October 2011	
For Global Mourning	27 November 2013	
