= War Stories (album) =

Studio album by Unkle
- Released: 20 June 2007
- Recorded: Autumn 2005 – Winter 2006 in Joshua Tree, Los Angeles, and London
- Genres: Alternative rock; trip hop; art rock
- Length: 70:44
- Label: Surrender All
- Producers: Chris Goss; UNKLE

Unkle chronology
Self Defence: Never, Never, Land Reconstructed and Bonus Beats (2006)	War Stories (2007)	More Stories (2008)

Professional ratings
Aggregate scores
Source	Rating
Metacritic	61/100
Review scores
Source	Rating
AllMusic	3/5 stars
Alternative Press	3.5/5 stars
The A.V. Club	B+
Blender	2/5 stars
The Guardian	3/5 stars
Hot Press	3.5/5 stars
Los Angeles Times	3/4 stars
musicOMH	3/5 stars
Pitchfork	4.5/10
PopMatters	5/10

War Stories is the third studio album by English electronic music group UNKLE. The album was released in Japan on 20 June 2007, UK and Europe on 2 July 2007, and in North America on 24 July. War Stories debuted at number 58 in Australia. The cover art was designed by 3D of Massive Attack.

== Release ==
The album was promoted by three singles: "Burn My Shadow", "Hold My Hand" and "Restless". The video for "Burn My Shadow" featured the actor Goran Visnjic and was directed by Miguel Sapochnik. The track "Chemistry" is used as the instrumental track for "Hello/Goodbye (Uncool)" by Lupe Fiasco from his 2007 album Lupe Fiasco's The Cool. Lupe Fiasco chose War Stories as his number 1 album of the year as posted to a video on Myspace. The track "Mayday" was featured in the 2008 video game Grand Theft Auto IV on the radio station Radio Broker. The track "When Things Explode" was used during the climax of the episode "Number Crunch" (Season 1, episode 10) from the TV series Person of Interest.

The most popular song from the album, "Burn My Shadow", was used during the climax of the movie Repo Men. It was also featured in an Assassin's Creed: Brotherhood trailer, the trailer for the 2009 video game Fuel, and in the episode "Flesh and Blood" (Season 1, episode 19) of the TV series Person of Interest. The song "Chemistry" was featured in Assassin's Creed: Brotherhood DLC "The Da Vinci Disappearance", a trailer for series six of Spooks and the documentary film Countdown to Zero (2010). "Hold My Hand" was featured briefly in the 2008 film 21. "Restless" has featured in multiple video games, most notably Electronic Arts' "Need For Speed: ProStreet" in 2007, as well as Codemasters' "Colin McRae: DiRT 2" in 2009, which also featured a remix of the song by Livio and Roby. "Lawless" was also featured in a 2009 Jagermeister ad.

== Track listing ==
1. "Intro" – 0:22
2. "Chemistry" – 3:22
3. "Hold My Hand" – 4:59
4. "Restless" (featuring Josh Homme) – 5:04
5. "Keys to the Kingdom" (featuring Gavin Clark) – 4:45
6. "Price You Pay" – 6:22
7. "Burn My Shadow" (featuring Ian Astbury) – 4:57
8. "Mayday" (featuring The Duke Spirit) – 3:18
9. "Persons & Machinery" (featuring Autolux) – 6:04
10. "Twilight" (featuring 3D) – 5:21
11. "Morning Rage" – 5:15
12. "Lawless" – 2:36
13. "Broken" (featuring Gavin Clark) – 4:42
14. "When Things Explode" (featuring Ian Astbury) – 5:32
15. "Buying a Lie" (featuring Lee Gorton) (Australian and Japanese bonus track plus in the UK on Indie Limited Edition) – 4:25
16. "Mistress" (featuring Alice Temple) (Australian and Japanese bonus track plus in the UK on Indie Limited Edition) – 3:48
17. "Tired of Sleeping" (hidden track) – 6:26

=== Disc two of the limited edition (SURR005CDXX) ===
1. "Hold My Hand" (Instrumental) – 4:59
2. "Restless" (Instrumental) – 5:04
3. "Keys to the Kingdom" (Instrumental) – 4:45
4. "Price You Pay" (Instrumental) – 6:22
5. "Burn My Shadow" (Instrumental) – 4:57
6. "Mayday" (Instrumental) – 3:18
7. "Persons & Machinery" (Instrumental) – 6:04
8. "Twilight" (Instrumental) – 5:21
9. "Morning Rage" (Instrumental) – 5:15
10. "Lawless" (Instrumental) – 2:36
11. "Broken" (Instrumental) – 4:42
12. "When Things Explode" (Instrumental) – 5:32

=== Exclusive pre-order bonus CD ===
1. Autolux, "Turnstile Blues (UNKLE Surrender Sounds Session 4)"
2. UNKLE, "A Wash of Black" (Instrumental UNKLE Remix of Muse's "Supermassive Black Hole")
3. Black Mountain, "No Hits (UNKLE Surrender Sounds Session 3)"
4. UNKLE, "Burn My Shadow (Jesse Somfay Mix)"

== Charts ==
Chart (2007)	Peak position
Australian Albums (ARIA)	58
Belgian Albums (Ultratop Flanders)	50
Dutch Albums (Album Top 100)	99
French Albums (SNEP)	84
Irish Albums (IRMA)	66
Scottish Albums (Official Charts)	68
Swiss Albums (Schweizer Hitparade)	58
UK Albums (Official Charts)	58
UK Album Downloads (Official Charts)	25
UK Dance Albums (Official Charts)	2
UK Independent Albums (Official Charts)	3
