= Future Beat Alliance =

English electronica musician

- Birth name: Matthew Puffett
- Also known as: Mode-M, Soul Electrik
- Origin: Oxford, England
- Genres: Ambient house
- Occupation: Musician
- Years active: 1996–present
- Labels: Void, Ferox, Archive, Delsin, Versatile, Emoticon, Suicide, Tresor, R&S Records

Matthew Puffett, known by the stage name Future Beat Alliance, is an English electronica musician and producer. He started producing music in 1996 by releasing it through Void Records.

== Biography ==
Puffett's career began in 1996, when he started producing music and releasing it through his own label, Void Records. He chose the stage name Future Beat Alliance after seeing it in the corner of "Renegades of Funk" record sleeve. Later, he moved to Ferox Records and then Archive Records. He released his Disconnected LP through Amsterdam based Delsin Records in 2001. He also released several singles through Emoticon, Versatile, Suicide, Exalt, Recondite, Rush Hour, and he released an ambient album through Stefan Robber's EevoNext Recordings.

In 2011 Future Beat Alliance signed to Tresor and started performing live with various techno musicians, including Juan Atkins, Octave One, Mark Broom, Ivan Smagghe, Steve Rachmad, RedShape, and Vince Watson.

In 2012 Puffett founded another record label, named FBA Recordings. He composed the soundtrack for a short film named EREBUS alongside James Lavelle, classical composer Philip Sheppard, and Chris Allen. Puffet also composed music for H&M's 2012/13 winter campaign, which was directed by the Grammy Award-winning film and music video director Jonas Åkerlund.

== Discography ==
- Hidden Emotion (1997), re-released in 2008
- Disconnected (2001)
- Patience and Distance (2009)
- Machines Can Help (2010)
- Beginner's Mind (2020)
- Lower The Anchor (2023)
