= South (band) =

British rock band

- Origin: Chalk Farm, London, England
- Genres: Alternative rock, post-Britpop
- Years active: 1998–2008
- Labels: Young American, Kinetic, Mo' Wax
- Members: Joel Cadbury; Jamie McDonald; Brett Shaw

South was an English rock band. The band consisted of lead singer Joel Cadbury, Brett Shaw, and Jamie McDonald. Each member was a multi-instrumentalist and they shared duties on guitars, bass, percussion, keyboards.

== Career ==
Formed at Haverstock School in Chalk Farm, London in 1998, South were originally conceived as an electronic act. The band were mentored by ex-Stone Roses frontman Ian Brown. The band later worked under the tutelage of UNKLE's James Lavelle, who signed the band to his personal record label.

After a promo album, Overused, was released in the U.S., South released their first official studio album, entitled From Here on In. They also played "Paint the Silence", which was featured in The O.C. as well as the third season of Roswell. Next came their second album, With the Tides, in 2003, which included "Colours in Waves" and "Loosen Your Hold", before the band took a couple of years off.

"A Place in Displacement", the first single from their third album, was released early in 2006, followed by the album Adventures in the Underground Journey to the Stars, which came out on 3 April 2006. A UK release followed on 9 October that year.

Their fourth album, You Are Here, was released in April 2008.

On Jamie McDonald's Myspace page, it was announced that the band were taking a hiatus, and that there were no future plans to get back together and record or play live again. Macdonald formed a new band called The Hug with Joel Cadbury on bass. Brett Shaw is currently a producer with his own studio in London and has been working with Florence and the Machine (Island), Rufus Wainwright (Decca), Paul Banks (of Interpol), Daughter (4AD), Still Corners (Sub Pop), Eliza Doolittle (EMI), Hawk House (Virgin EMI), Swim Deep (Chess Club), and Clean Bandit featuring Jess Glynne (Atlantic).

Macdonald released two solo EPs, The Head on Collider EP and The Shelf Life EP, both in 2010.

From Here on Out, released on 26 March 2021, was a compilation of tracks from the From Here on In era.

== Discography ==
=== Albums ===
- From Here on In (2001)
- With the Tides (2003)
- Adventures in the Underground Journey to the Stars (2006)
- You Are Here (2008)

=== EPs ===
- All in For Nothing (2001)
- Constantly Burning (2001)
- Speed Up / Slow Down (2005)

=== Singles ===
1999

- "Time To Riot" / "Dub Remedies" (7" – 1000 only, part 1 of 3 x 7" set) (Mo' Wax MWR 117S)
- "Run on Time" / "Torriano" (7" – 1000 only, part 2 of 3 x 7" set) (Mo' Wax MWR 118S)

2000

- "Sight of Me" / "Better Things" (7" – 1000 only, part 3 of 3 x 7" set) (Mo' Wax MWR 119S)
- "4 Track Sessions" (12") (Mo' Wax MWR 120)
- "Interim" (10", 12" Promo) (Mo' Wax MWR 133)

2001

- "Paint The Silence" (12", 12" Promo, 2xCDS) (Mo' Wax MWR 134) – UK No. 69
- "Keep Close" (10", CDS) (Mo' Wax MWR 144)
- "Broken Head" (2x12" Promo) (Mo' Wax SOUTH DJ1/SOUTH DJ2)

2003

- "Loosen Your Hold" (7", CDS) (Double Dragon DD2010) – UK No. 73

2004

- "Colours in Waves" (12", CDS) (Sanctuary SAN 249) – UK No. 60
- "Motiveless Crime" (7", CDS) (Sanctuary SAN 286) – UK No. 72

2006

- "A Place in Displacement" (7", CDS) (Genepool GPOOL010)
- "Up Close And Personal" (7", CDS) (Cooking Vinyl FRY 278)

2008

- "Better Things" (7") (Bluhammock Music 80032)
- "Wasted" (7") (Genepool GPOOL017)

=== Compilation albums ===
- Overused (2000)
- Music from the OC: Mix 1 (2004, Warner Bros./WEA) – "Paint the Silence"
- Acoustic 07 (2007, V2 Records) – "Up Close and Personal"
- From Here on Out (2021)
