= Unkle =

British electronica band

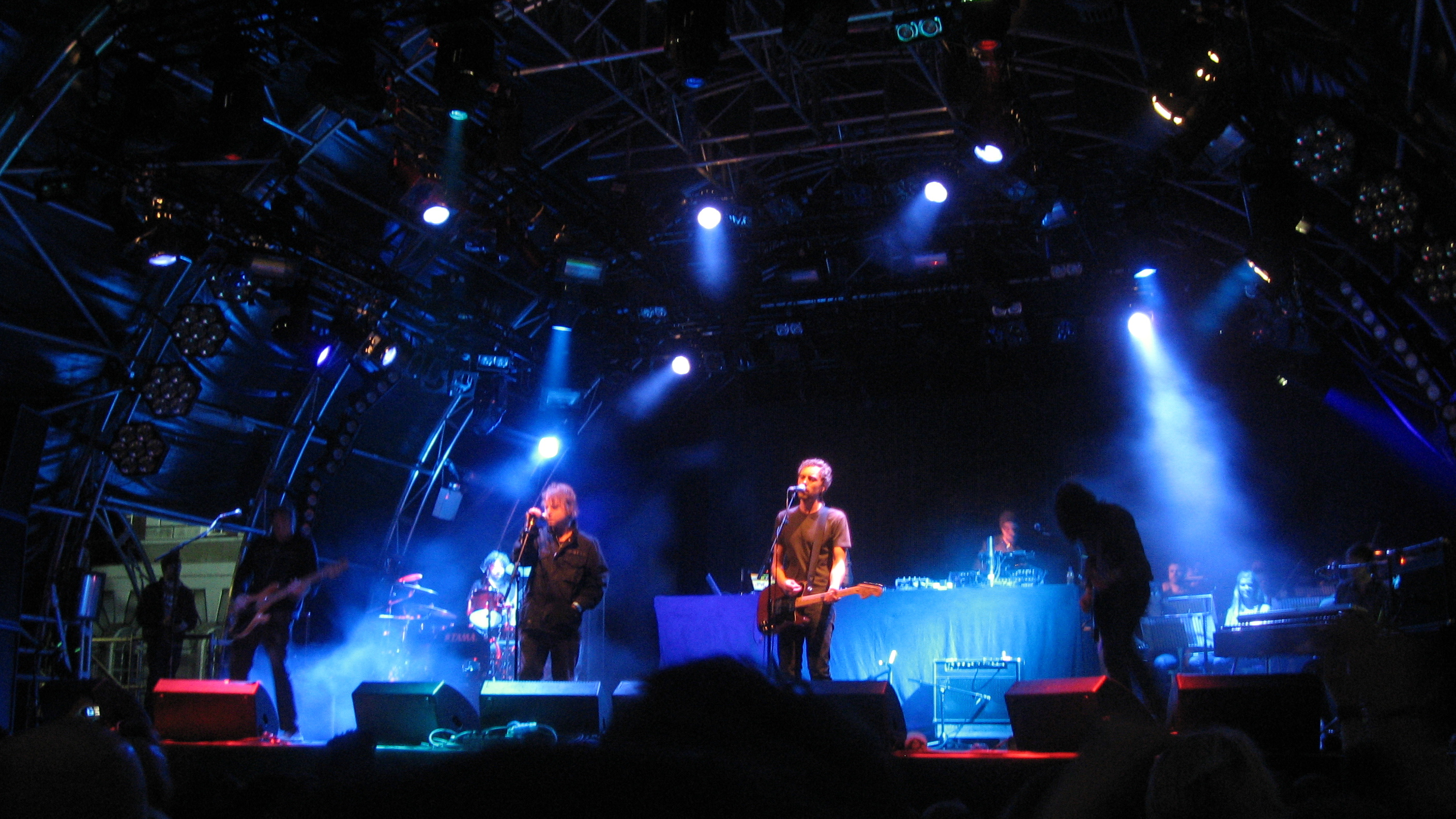
- Unkle performing at Somerset House in London in 2008

Background information
- Also known as: Men from U.N.K.L.E. (1992–1994); U.N.K.L.E. (1994–1998); UNKLE Sounds
- Origin: London, England
- Genres: Electronic; trip hop; alternative rock
- Years active: 1992–present
- Labels: Mo' Wax; Global Underground; Surrender-All; Songs for the Def
- Members: James Lavelle
- Past members: Tim Goldsworthy; Toshio Nakanishi; K.U.D.O; DJ Shadow; Rich File; Pablo Clements; Matthew Puffett; Jack Leonard; Joel Cadbury
- Website: unkle.com

Unkle (often stylised as U.N.K.L.E. or UNKLE, occasionally known as UNKLE Sounds) is a British musical act founded in 1992 by James Lavelle. Originally categorised as trip hop, the group once included producer DJ Shadow and have employed a variety of guest artists and producers.

== History ==
=== First incarnation (1992–1996) ===
The first release credited to the 'Men from U.N.K.L.E' was a remix for United Future Organization, included on their 1992 Loud Minority single. Lavelle and Goldsworthy were joined by Masayuki Kudo and Toshio Nakanishi of the Japanese hip hop crew Major Force (later Major Force West).

=== Second incarnation (1997–1999) ===
Lavelle drafted in DJ Shadow to work on the debut album, and essentially discarded all previously recorded material. Lavelle and Shadow released Psyence Fiction in 1998 to a mixed critical response. The album included collaborations with an all-star lineup including Thom Yorke (Radiohead), Mark Hollis (Talk Talk), Mike D (Beastie Boys), Kool G Rap, Jason Newsted (Metallica), Badly Drawn Boy and Richard Ashcroft (The Verve). The album was mixed by Shadow's long-time collaborator, producer Jim Abbiss.

Shadow left the group after touring Psyence Fiction and was replaced by turntablist group the Scratch Perverts, who deconstructed the album and performed it live on turntables in 1999. Also in 1999, former producer Rich File remixed the track "Unreal", adding vocals by Ian Brown, and the resulting track was released as the single Be There.

On 1 February 1999, Lavelle and the Scratch Perverts appeared on the Radio 1 program The Breezeblock, utilising "5 turntables". The set was largely based on tracks from Psyence Fiction, with some of them reworked live by Lavelle for the live performance. The Scratch Perverts' contribution consisted of scratching over the top of the Unkle tracks, a deconstructed version of "Be There", and some solo interludes.

=== Third incarnation (2000–2007) ===
In 2001, Lavelle and File resurfaced as Unklesounds, with a DJ mix created for Japanese radio entitled Do Androids Dream of Electric Beats? This highlighted a new, more electronic direction the group had taken, and featured a number of tracks from Psyence Fiction, remixed in a techy breakbeat style.

Rich File co-produced, played and sang on the second album, Never, Never, Land, released in 2003. The album again featured a number of high-profile contributors, including Ian Brown, Josh Homme (Queens of the Stone Age), Robert Del Naja (Massive Attack) and Mani (The Stone Roses, Primal Scream) among others.

Lavelle and File continued releasing mixes as Unklesounds. The mix album Edit Music for a Film: Original Motion Picture Soundtrack Reconstruction, featuring movie samples and tracks from film soundtracks, was created for the After Dark 2004 event at the ICA London. A single CD version was handed out at the event, and it was released officially as an extended two disc set in 2005. The group recorded music for a short film titled The Seed directed by Joe Hahn alongside John Debney and Mike Shinoda of Linkin Park.

In September 2006, Global Underground released Self Defence: Never, Never, Land Reconstructed and Bonus Beats, a 4-CD box set of remixes and bonus tracks from the Never, Never, Land sessions, including tracks previously only available on the original DVD release of the album. It also contained remixes of a track mooted for their next album, featuring Ian Astbury of The Cult, titled "Burn My Shadow".

War Stories, the third album from Unkle, was released in summer 2007. The album again featured a number of guests including Josh Homme, Gavin Clark, Robert Del Naja, Ian Astbury, The Duke Spirit, Autolux and Neil Davidge. Following the release of the single "Hold My Hand", Pablo Clements (of The Psychonauts) became an Unkle member.

=== Fourth incarnation (2008–present) ===
In January 2008 Unkle released More Stories, containing a mix of B-sides, remixes, unreleased War Stories session tracks, and music composed for the film Odyssey in Rome. The same month, Rich File announced he was leaving Unkle after 10 years' collaboration to pursue work with his new band, We Fell to Earth. In March the Lazarides Gallery in London showcased War Paint, an exhibition of artworks inspired by the recent Unkle album War Stories, with works from Robert Del Naja, Warren Du Preez and Nick Thornton Jones, Will Bankhead and Ben Drury. Unkle began touring the UK with Zoot Woman and Sebastian and Mr. Flash from the French electro record label Ed Banger Records. The concert, set across four acts, featured live performances from past Unkle contributors including Badly Drawn Boy, Liela Moss from The Duke Spirit, Gavin Clark and Joel Cadbury from South.

Unkle's fourth full album titled End Titles... Stories for Film was released in July 2008. It includes collaborations with Chris Goss, Black Mountain, Philip Sheppard, Dave Bateman, Joel Cadbury, and James Griffith (Lake Trout). The album is described in the sleeve notes by Lavelle as "not a new album in the usual sense, but new music that has been inspired by the moving image." As such, it can be considered a companion piece both to War Stories but also to the earlier Unklesounds mix, Edit Music for a Film.

14 December 2008 saw the digital release of End Titles... Redux, an album that was released the following day in a limited pressing of 3000 CDs available from official Unkle stores. This release features seven re-interpreted tracks from the album End Titles... Stories for Film plus 2 never-before-released tracks, "When Once It Was" and "A Perfect Storm". The exclusive package is a 6-panel soft-pack with a 12-page booklet with images by Robert Del Naja.

Upon the release of the single "Heavy Drug (Surrender Sounds Mix)" in August 2009, Unkle disclosed they had already begun recording their next studio album, Where Did the Night Fall, which was released in May 2010. This also included an all-star cast of performers including: Mark Lanegan, Nick Cave, The Black Angels, Sleepy Sun, and Katrina Ford, as well as ELLE J and Gavin Clark. The album is also available as a digital download from Unkle's site.

It was announced on 18 April 2011 that Unkle would headline the Dance Stage at the Reading and Leeds Festivals. They would be performing a world-exclusive audio-visual DJ set at the festivals, playing songs from their back catalogue alongside remixes of other artists' songs as well as Unkle's own material. They would be performing under the name Unkle Sounds.

On 27 February 2014, the "God of Light (Original Game Soundtrack)" single was published on iTunes, with two songs from the God of Light game by Playmous and EON. The in-game credits list "Music composed by: UNKLE / James Lavelle / Charlie May."

On 15 July 2016 Unkle released the single "Cowboys or Indians", which featured artists Ysée, Mink, and Elliott Power. Pitchfork reported Unkle would release an album that same year. In January 2017, Unkle announced the pending release of the album The Road: Part I, which will be preceded by the single "Sick Lullaby" to be released in mid February 2017. It coincides with an exhibition at the Lazarides gallery in London.

Unkle collaborated with Michael Kiwanuka for the track "On My Knees" for a companion album to the 2018 Netflix film Roma and a new mix of this track later appeared on the 2021 album Rōnin I.

== Members ==
=== Current members ===
- James Lavelle – production, instruments (1992–present)

=== Former members ===
- Tim Goldsworthy – production (1992–1996)
- Toshio Nakanishi – production (1994–1996; died 2017)
- K.U.D.O. (Masayuki Kudo) – production (1994–1996)
- DJ Shadow (Josh Davis) – production, turntables (1997–1999)
- Rich File – vocals, guitar, production (1999–2008)
- Pablo Clements – production, instruments (2003–2011)
- Jack Leonard – vocals, guitar, bass, production (2014–2018; session member 2018–2020)
- Matthew Puffett (Future Beat Alliance) – keyboards (2016–2018; session member 2018–2020)

=== Current touring members ===
- Alex Thomas – drums (2015–present)
- Liela Moss – vocals, keyboards (2016–present)
- Steve Weston – engineering, keyboards, guitar, bass, visuals (2016–present)

=== Former touring members ===
- The Scratch Perverts (First Rate, Tony Vegas and Prime Cuts) – turntables, visuals (1999)
- Bob Knight – drums (2003–2004)
- Antony Genn – bass (2003–2004)
- Rich Fownes – guitar (2007–2008)
- James Griffith – bass, guitar, vocals (2007–2014)
- Mike Lowry – drums (2007–2014)
- Matt Pierce – keyboards (2007–2014)
- Steven Young – bass, vocals (2010–2017)
- Jack Leonard – vocals, guitar, bass, production (2018–2020; band member 2014–2018)
- Matthew Puffett (Future Beat Alliance) – keyboards (2018–2020; band member 2016–2018)
- Joel Cadbury - vocals, guitar (2007-2011; unofficial band member 2003-2011)
- Gavin Clark - vocals (2007-2011)

== Discography ==
- Psyence Fiction (1998)
- Never, Never, Land (2003)
- War Stories (2007)
- End Titles... Stories For Film (2008)
- Where Did the Night Fall (2010)
- The Road: Part I (2017)
- The Road: Part II (Lost Highway) (2019)

== Appearances ==
Albums	Appearances in media
	Unkle's work has been played on BBC's Top Gear on a regular basis since Season 2.
	Unkle was featured in the music for the movie The Seed.
Songs	Appearances in media
Sunna - "I'm Not Trading (UNKLE - In Utero)"	Mix of Sunna track on "I'm Not Trading" Maxi-Single.
"Lonely Soul"	Advertisement for Xbox 360 and the PlayStation 3 game Assassin's Creed.; Soundtrack for film The Beach.; Soundtrack for Misfits (TV series) episode 1.; Played in Season 1 Episode 20 of Person of Interest.; Credits theme for Season 1 of Hijack (TV series).
"The Healing"	Played on BBC Panorama - British Schools, Islamic Rules
"Reign"	Theme for "90 Minutes, 90 Emotions" of the 2007–08 A-League season.; Soundtrack for MasterChef BBC TV show.
"Glow"	Soundtrack for film Push.
"Safe in Mind (Please Take This Gun from Out My Face)"	"Teddy Bears Picnic" advertisement for Lucozade; Trailer for Dead Kings DLC in video game Assassin's Creed Unity.
"Eye for an Eye"	Soundtrack for Made Man, a computer game for PC and Sony PS2; Trailer for Prison Break on Channel Five; Played at the end of the BBC's coverage of the Formula 1 Bahrain Grand Prix Qualifying 2010; Advertisement for Nike, Inc; Trailer for Television adaptation of Chris Ryan's Strike Back on Sky1HD; Soundtrack for the game Driver: San Francisco
Queens of the Stone Age – "No One Knows (UNKLE Remix)"	Soundtrack for video games Race Driver: Grid, Test Drive Unlimited and SSX 3; Used in a trailer for film The Bourne Ultimatum
"Leap of Faith"	Soundtrack for film Goal!
"Chemistry"	Trailer for Series 6 of TV show Spooks; Soundtrack for Psyche; Soundtrack for MasterChef TV show; Advertisement for a 2011 NFL Playoff Game; Trailer for The Da Vinci Disappearance DLC in Assassin's Creed: Brotherhood; Alan Wake accolades trailer
"Keys to the Kingdom"	Played during a lab scene in a season eight episode of CSI; Trailer for Heroes season 1; Trailer for CSI: NY on Channel Five; Played on Cold Case; Played during the tennis scene in film Deception
"Price You Pay"	Played during a scene in film Deception
"Restless"	Trailer for CSI: Crime Scene Investigation on Channel Five; Soundtrack for video game Need for Speed: ProStreet, the song became an "EA Track"; Soundtrack for video game Colin McRae: Dirt 2; Soundtrack for CSI: NY episode 401, "Can You Hear Me Now?"; Played on BBC's Top Gear Season 15, Episode 5 - "VW Touareg vs Snowmobiles"; Soundtrack for Misfits (TV series) series two, episode two "(Fake Blood Remix)"; Played during a scene in film Fright Night (2011)
"Burn My Shadow"	Trailer for FUEL video game by Codemasters; Soundtrack for CSI: NY episode 414, "Playing with Matches"; Trailer for video game Alone in the Dark: Inferno; Trailer for Single Player campaign Assassin's Creed: Brotherhood; Soundtrack for 2010 film Repo Men; Played in Season 1 Episode 19 of Person of Interest; Advertisement for Mercedes-Benz; Played at the credits of The Raven; Several occasions as shorter cuts of the song Top Gear
"Hold My Hand"	Soundtrack for film 21; Soundtrack for film Trance
"Mayday (featuring The Duke Spirit)"	Soundtrack for video game Grand Theft Auto IV; Soundtrack for MasterChef TV show; Soundtrack for surf documentary A Fly in the Champagne; Played on BBC's Top Gear Season, 15 Episode 3 - "Four Door Supercars"
"Broken (featuring Gavin Clark)"	Soundtrack for film The X-Files: I Want to Believe, played on the Surfing DVD A Fly in the Champagne; Plays during the end credits of the video game Alpha Protocol
"Awake the Unkind"	Soundtrack for American TV show Queer as Folk season 5, episode 5
"Heaven"	Soundtrack for Lakai Shoes' Fully Flared skateboarding video; Trailer for video game DiRT 3 teaser
"Trouble in Paradise (Variation on a Theme)"	Background for the 2007 BMW See How It Feels television commercial; Theme for Euro 2008, football tournament.; Played on BBC Panorama - British Schools, Islamic Rules; Played on BBC's Top Gear Season, 14 Episode 3 - "Lancia's Seven Great Cars Tribute"
"With You in My Head (featuring The Black Angels)"	Soundtrack for film The Twilight Saga: Eclipse
"Ian Brown - F.E.A.R. (UNKLE Remix)"	Soundtrack for video game F1 2010 by Codemasters (Main Intro Theme and Developers Diary Trailers 1–5)
"Heavy Drug (Surrender Sounds Mix)"	Soundtrack for Skins series 4, episode 3 "Cook"
"The Answer"	Soundtrack for film Drive Angry; Soundtrack for video game DiRT 3
"Synthetic Water"	Played on BBC's Top Gear Season 13, Episode 5 - "Jaguar XFR vs BMW M5 Review"; Played during an interview with Lewis Hamilton on the BBC's coverage of the Formula 1 2011 Turkish Grand Prix
"Unreal"	Soundtrack for the video game Driver: San Francisco
"When Things Explode"	Played in Season 1 Episode 10 of Person of Interest.; Trailer for video game Binary Domain
"Money and Run (featuring Nick Cave)"	Soundtrack for video game Need for Speed: The Run
"Lawless"	Advertisement for Jägermeister; Played in Season 5 Episode 22 of The Blacklist
"Farewell"	Played in Season 6 Episode 11 of The Blacklist; Played in Season 3 Episode 02 of The Good Doctor (American TV series)
"Into the Light"	God of Light (Original Game Soundtrack)
"Out of the Light"	God of Light (Original Game Soundtrack)
"The First Time Ever I Saw Your Face (feat. Keaton Henson)"	Soundtrack in Shelter (2014)
"Looking for the Rain (feat. Mark Lanegan, ESKA)"	Soundtrack in The Rain (2018)
Robert Plant - "The Enchanter (Unkle Reconstruction)"	Appears in Mighty ReArranger remastered version

== Tours ==
- 2008 Unkle Live – UK Tour Stories
- 2008 Creamfields Buenos Aires, Argentina.
