= McBean =

McBean is a surname. Notable people with the surname include:

== People ==
- Al McBean (1938–2024), retired professional baseball player
- Alexander McBean (1854–1937), English businessman, soldier, local Conservative politician, Freemason and Churchman in the Midlands
- Angus McBean (1904–1990), Welsh photographer, associated with surrealism
- Brett McBean, award-winning Australian horror and speculative fiction writer
- Don McBean, Canadian politician
- Gordon McBean, Canadian climatologist, chairman of the board of trustees of the Canadian Foundation for Climate and Atmospheric Sciences
- Jack McBean (born 1994), midfielder in Major League Soccer
- James McBean, Scottish footballer
- Marnie McBean (born 1968), Canadian rower and senator
- Robert McBean, Scottish footballer
- Ryan McBean (born 1984), American football defensive tackle
- Wayne McBean (born 1969), retired ice hockey defenceman
- William McBean VC (1818–1878), Scottish recipient of the Victoria Cross

== Fictional characters ==
- Sylvester McMonkey McBean, "fix-it-up chappie" in Sneetches stories by American author Dr. Seuss
- Tracey McBean, fictional character in children's books drawn and written by Mary Small and Arthur Filloy
- Willy McBean and his Magic Machine (1965), Rankin/Bass full-length stop-motion puppet animated film

== See also ==
- McBean (disambiguation)
- MacBrayne (disambiguation)
- MacBreak
- MacBrien
- McBain (disambiguation)
- McBee
- McBrien
