= Anywhere =

Anywhere may refer to:

== Albums ==
- Anywhere (Anywhere album), 2012
- Anywhere (Flower Travellin' Band album), 1970
- Anywhere (New Musik album), 1981

== Songs ==
- "Anywhere" (112 song), 1999
- "Anywhere" (Sara Evans song), 2011
- "Anywhere" (Mustard and Nick Jonas song), 2018
- "Anywhere" (Rita Ora song), 2017
- "Anywhere" (Beth Orton song), 2002
- "Anywhere" (Page 44 song), 2007
- "Anywhere" (Passenger song), 2016
- "Anywhere" (Sigma song), 2018
- "Anywhere" (Axle Whitehead song), 2008
- "Anywhere", a song by Au5 and Slander, 2021
- "Anywhere", a song by Peakboy
- "Anywhere", a song by Jule Styne and Sammy Cahn

== Other uses ==
- Anywhere (band), a psychedelic/progressive rock band
- TVB Anywhere, an online pay-TV and shopping platform
