= Wilderness Heart =

Studio album by Black Mountain
- Released: September 14, 2010
- Genre: Psychedelic rock, progressive rock, alternative rock
- Length: 42:49
- Label: Jagjaguwar
- Producer: Black Mountain

Black Mountain chronology
| In the Future (2008) | Wilderness Heart (2010) | IV (2016) |

Professional ratings
Review scores
| Source | Rating |
|---|---|
| AllMusic | 3.5/5 stars |
| One Thirty BPM | 75% |
| Pitchfork Media | 7.4/10 |
| Rolling Stone | 3/5 stars |

Wilderness Heart is the third studio album by Black Mountain, released on September 14, 2010.

The album received a nod from Exclaim! magazine as the No. 18 Pop & Rock Album of 2010. The album was also named as a longlisted nominee for the 2011 Polaris Music Prize.

== Usage in media ==
The single "Let Spirits Ride", was featured on the soundtrack of the game Saints Row: The Third

The song “The Hair Song” was played over the end credits in second season of LetterKenny for episode five, “Uncle Eddie’s Trust”.

== Track listing ==
All songs written by Stephen McBean.

1. "The Hair Song" - 3:54
2. "Old Fangs" - 4:01
3. "Radiant Hearts" - 3:52
4. "Rollercoaster" - 5:15
5. "Let Spirits Ride" - 4:20
6. "Buried by the Blues" - 4:02
7. "The Way to Gone" - 4:03
8. "Wilderness Heart" - 3:58
9. "The Space of Your Mind" - 4:14
10. "Sadie" - 5:10

== Personnel ==
- Amber Webber — vocals, percussion
- Stephen McBean — electric and acoustic guitars, vocals
- Jeremy Schmidt — organ, synthesizer, Mellotron
- Matthew Camirand — bass, baritone guitar
- Joshua Wells — drums, vocals, percussion, piano

== Charts ==
| Chart (2010) | Peak position |
|---|---|
| France (SNEP) | 110 |
| German Newcomer Chart | 11 |
