= Darryl Brown =

Darryl Brown may refer to:

- Darryl Brown (South African cricketer) (born 1983)
- Darryl Brown (West Indian cricketer) (born 1973)
- Darryl Brown, drummer for Weather Report from July through December 1974
