= Anywhen =

Anywhen may refer to:

- At any point in time
- Anywhen, a novella by James Blish
- Anywhen, a project by Philippe Parreno

== See also ==
- Anywhere (disambiguation)
