= Black Mountain (album) =

Studio album by Black Mountain
- Released: January 18, 2005
- Recorded: winter & spring 2004; the Argyle Hotel, and the Hive, North Hollywood
- Genres: Psychedelic rock, alternative rock, stoner rock
- Length: 46:24
- Label: Jagjaguwar
- Producer: Black Mountain

Black Mountain chronology
Black Mountain (2005)	In the Future (2008)

Singles from Black Mountain
- 1. "Druganaut" Released: 2004

Professional ratings
Review scores
Source	Rating
AllMusic	3.5/5 stars
Pitchfork	8.3/10
PopMatters	3/10
Rolling Stone	8/25/2005
Tiny Mix Tapes	1/5 marks

Black Mountain is the debut album by Black Mountain released by Jagjaguwar in 2005. In 2015 an expanded 16 track version was re-released.

== Critical reception ==
Pitchfork provided a mostly positive review, stating Black Mountain provided "perfect amount of tarnish to make the songs feel lived-in without burying them in fry grease."

In 2006, Andrew Gaerig of Stylus Magazine compared Black Mountain to singer Stephen McBean's previous album, Pink Mountaintops (2004): "Pink Mountaintops was imperfect in every way, but it cleared a path for last year’s Black Mountain debut, a tighter, focused group effort that nonetheless adopted McBean’s stoned, loose aesthetic. It was a 'better' record than the Pink Mountaintops disc, but it didn’t feel like a finished product so much as a particularly lucid jam session."

== Track listing ==
All songs written by Stephen McBean.

1. "Modern Music" – 2:44
2. "Don't Run Our Hearts Around" – 6:03
3. "Druganaut" – 3:47
4. "No Satisfaction" – 3:47
5. "Set Us Free" – 6:45
6. "No Hits" – 6:45
7. "Heart of Snow" – 7:59
8. "Faulty Times" – 8:34
9. "Bonus Track; Jonny Svenson Lives" – 10:21

=== 10th Anniversary Deluxe Edition ===
Disc one

2015 Remaster of original album

Disc two

1. "Druganaut (Extended Remix)" – 8:15
2. "Buffalo Swan" – 9:08
  - 1-2 from "Druganaut" 12-inch single (2005, Jagjaguwar)
3. "Bicycle Man" – 3:21
  - From 7-inch split single with Destroyer (2004, Spirit of Orr)
4. "Behind the Fall" – 3:01
  - From "Druganaut" CD EP (2005, Jagjaguwar)
5. "Set Us Free (Demo)" – 5:56
6. "Black Mountain (Demo)" – 3:27
7. "No Satisfaction (UK Radio)" – 4:25
8. "It Wasn't Arson" – 4:42
  - 5-8 previously unreleased; demos recorded 2002

== Personnel ==
Black Mountain

- Stephen McBean – guitar, vocals
- Amber Webber – vocals
- Jeremy Schmidt – keyboards
- Matthew Camirand – bass
- Joshua Wells – drums

Additional personnel

- Masa Anzai – saxophone ("Modern Music", "No Hits", "Bicycle Man", "Behind the Fall")
- Christoph Hofmeister – Fender Rhodes electric piano ("Set Us Free")
- Colin Stewart – engineer
- Doug Van Sloun – mastering (original release)
- Alan Douches – mastering (10th Anniversary Deluxe Edition)
- Toby Bannister – photography

== See also ==
Amazon.com's Top 100 Editor's Picks of 2005 (#90)
