= Destroyer (Black Mountain album) =

Studio album by Black Mountain
- Released: May 24, 2019
- Genres: Hard rock; neo-psychedelia; progressive rock; space rock; stoner rock
- Length: 42:58
- Label: Dine Alone
- Producer: John Congleton

Black Mountain chronology
| IV (2016) | Destroyer (2019) | Echoes (2021) |

Singles from Destroyer
- 1. "Future Shade" Released: March 7, 2019; 2. "Boogie Lover" Released: August 11, 2019; 3. "Licensed to Drive" Released: May 8, 2019

Destroyer is the fifth studio album by the Canadian psychedelic rock band, Black Mountain. It was released on May 24, 2019, by Dine Alone Records and was the band's first new material in three years after their fourth album, IV.

Destroyer is the first album with Rachel Fannan (from Sleepy Sun) and Adam Bulgasem (from Dommengang and Soft Kill).

== Background ==
The album was first announced on March 7, 2019, with the release of a single, "Future Shade", described by the lead singer, Stephen McBean, as a "warping" and "rending". McBean described the riff as one that has "traveled around the world then hit the bong with a chorus a year and a half later. A last attempt at double frosting produced a chorus on chorus death match. Anxiety is the new heavy metal."

The album takes its name from discontinued single-run 1985 Dodge Destroyer. The album also refers to the fact that McBean obtained his driver's license in 2017.

Destroyer has contributions from The Flaming Lips' Kliph Scurlock and Oneida's Kid Millions.

== Style and composition ==
Destroyer has been described as having a mixture of stoner rock, progressive rock, hard rock, neo-psychedelia and space rock.

== Promotion ==
=== Singles ===
Three singles were released before Destroyer. The first single, "Future Shade", was released on March 7, 2019. "Boogie Lover" came out on April 11, 2019, and "Licensed to Drive" on May 8, 2019.

David Nadelle of Tiny Mix Tapes described "Boogie Lover" as a "bevy of heavy friends both old and new", referring to the appearances by Jeremy Schmidt, Kliph Scurlock (The Flaming Lips), Kid Millions (Oneida), Rachel Fannan (Sleepy Sun) and Adam Bulgasem (Dommengang). Chris DeVille of Stereogum called the song "a spacey, doomy slow creep on which the band sounds as towering and geological as their band name suggests".

Also writing for Stereogum, Tom Breihan praised "Licensed to Drive", saying the track "starts out with eerie horror-movie theatrics, locks into ’70s-style dragon-trudge metal, and climaxes with a wild Edgar Winter-ish synth solo. It's flaming-sword music, music for blasting off into the cosmos on a tricked-out GTO."

== Critical reception ==
Professional ratings
Aggregate scores
| Source | Rating |
|---|---|
| Album of the Year | 72/100 |
| Metacritic | 74/100 |
Review scores
| Source | Rating |
| The 405 | 7.5/10 |
| AllMusic | 4/5 stars |
| Exclaim! | 8/10 |
| Glide Magazine | 7/10 |
| Loud and Quiet | 6/10 |
| Mojo | 3/5 stars |
| Paste | 7.9/10 |
| Pitchfork | 7.0/10 |
| Uncut | 4/5 stars |

Destroyer was well received by contemporary music critics. At the review aggregator website, Metacritic, the album has an average rating of 74 out of 100 based on ten critic reviews indicating generally favorable reviews.

== Track listing ==
| No. | Title | Length |
|---|---|---|
| 1. | "Future Shade" | 5:10 |
| 2. | "Horns Arising" | 6:50 |
| 3. | "Closer to the Edge" | 2:54 |
| 4. | "High Rise" | 6:12 |
| 5. | "Pretty Little Lazies" | 5:00 |
| 6. | "Boogie Lover" | 6:20 |
| 7. | "Licensed to Drive" | 4:46 |
| 8. | "FD'72" | 5:46 |
| Total length: | | 42:58 |

== Personnel ==
Black Mountain

- Stephen McBean — vocals, electric guitar; bass (tracks 1, 2, 6, 8), percussion (tracks 2, 4–8), E-Bow (tracks 3, 7), LinnDrum programming (tracks 3, 4, 8), acoustic guitar (track 5), organ (track 6)
- Jeremy Schmidt — synthesizer; Mellotron (tracks 1–3, 5–8), vocoder (tracks 2, 7)
- Rachel Fannan — vocals (tracks 1, 4–7)
- Arjan Miranda — bass (tracks 1, 7), acoustic guitar (track 2), E-Bow (tracks 3, 4)
- Adam Bulgasem — drums (tracks 1, 7)

Additional Personnel

- Brad Truax — bass (track 4)
- Steve Fishman — bass (track 5)
- Andy Anderson — bass (track 7)
- Kilph Scurlock — drums (tracks 2, 5, 6)
- Kid Millions — drums (track 4)

== Charts ==
| Chart (2019) | Peak position |
|---|---|
| German Albums (Offizielle Top 100) | 54 |
| Scottish Albums (Official Charts) | 53 |
| Swiss Albums (Schweizer Hitparade) | 61 |
| US Independent Albums (Billboard) | 19 |
| US Top Album Sales (Billboard) | 75 |
