= Pink Mountaintops =

Canadian rock and roll band

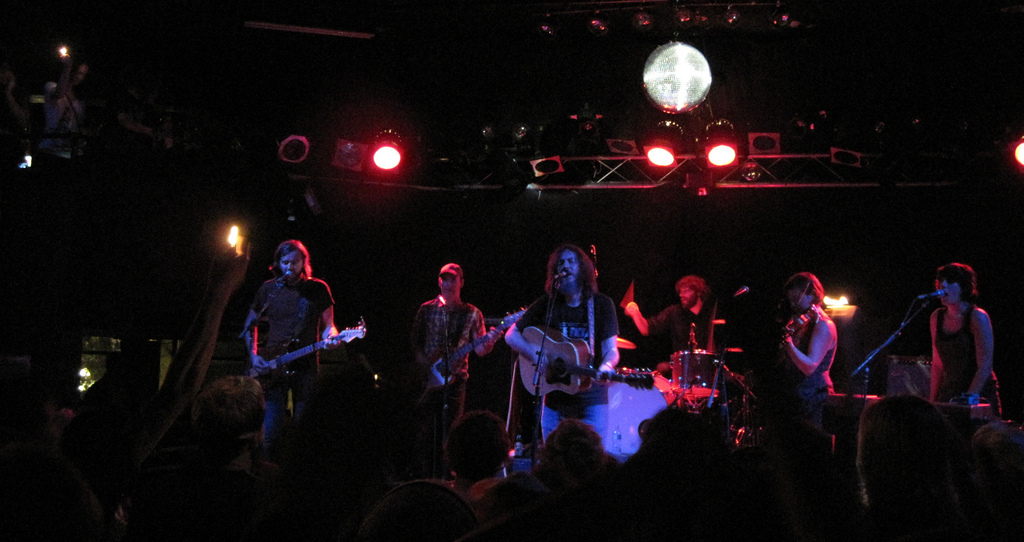

Background information
- Also known as: Stephen McBean
- Origin: Vancouver, British Columbia, Canada
- Genres: Psychedelic rock, folk rock, Experimental rock, Indie rock
- Years active: 2003–present
- Labels: Jagjaguwar, Low Transit Industries
- Members: Stephen McBean
- Past members: Jules Ferrari; Sophie Trudeau; Rachel Fannan; Ashley Webber; Tolan McNeil; Cory Gangnes; Fiona Ackerman; Sar Friedman; Mike Maximuik; Chad Ross; Megan Boddy; Lindy Gerrard; Nate Ryan; Colin Ryan; Stephanie Hunt; Bob Mustachio; Matthew Camirand; Keith Parry; Josh Stevenson; Ted Bois; Steve Balogh; Brad McKinnon; Lynday Sung; CC Rose; Jonah Fortune; Diego Del Castillo; Mia Del Castillo; Joshua Wells; Amber Webber; Jesse Sykes; Phil Wandscher; Jon Wang; Steve Kille; Matthew Aveiro; Jonathan Russell; Nathan Willett; Matt Maust.
- Website: pinkmountaintops.com

Pink Mountaintops is a Canadian rock and roll band from Vancouver led by Stephen McBean.

The band's first album, The Pink Mountaintops, featured Amber Webber and Joshua Wells. The tracks varied from alt-country to indie rock.

The band's recording Outside Love included contributions from members of several other bands. It was number one on the Canadian campus radio top 50 chart in May and again in June 2009.

Pink Mountaintop's fourth album, Get Back, was released in 2014. Musicians included Annie Hardy, Gregg Foreman, and Rob Barbato. The album was recorded in Los Angeles and produced by Joe Cardamone.

== Band members ==
- Stephen McBean

Live:

- Stephen McBean
- Emily Rose
- Kliph Scurlock
- Tygh Runyan

== Discography ==
=== Albums ===
- Pink Mountaintops (Jagjaguwar, 2004)
- Axis of Evol (Jagjaguwar, 2006)
- Outside Love (Jagjaguwar, 2009)
- Get Back (Jagjaguwar, 2014)
- Peacock Pools (ATO Records, 2022)

=== Singles ===
- "The Ones I Love" / "Erected" (Jagjaguwar, 2005)
- "Single Life" / "My Best Friend" (Jagjaguwar, 2007)
- "Asleep with an Angel" / "The Beat" (Jagjaguwar, 2014)
- "Lights of the City" (ATO Records, 2022)
- "Nervous Breakdown" (ATO Records, 2022)
- "Nikki Go Sudden" (ATO Records, 2022)
