= Pink Mountaintops (album) =

Studio album by Pink Mountaintops
- Released: July 20, 2004
- Recorded: 2004
- Genre: Indie rock
- Length: 33:08
- Label: Jagjaguwar
- Producer: Pink Mountaintops

Pink Mountaintops chronology
Pink Mountaintops (2004)	Axis of Evol (2006)

Professional ratings
Review scores
Source	Rating
AllMusic	3.5/5 stars
Pitchfork Media	7.0/10

Pink Mountaintops is the debut album by Pink Mountaintops, released by Jagjaguwar in 2004.

== Track listing ==
1. "Bad Boogie Ballin'" – 3:32
2. "Rock'n'roll Fantasy" – 3:36
3. "I (Fuck) Mountains" – 4:42
4. "Can You Do That Dance?" – 3:35
5. "Sweet '69" – 4:02
6. "Leslie" – 4:21
7. "Tourist in Your Town" – 4:27
8. "Atmosphere" – 4:53

== Additional information ==
This record was not noted by the indie rock scene until 2005, when Stephen McBean's other band, Black Mountain, released their debut record (also on Jagjaguwar). Stephen McBean supposedly wrote the material when Jerk With a Bomb (who turned into the previously mentioned band) were on tour, and hastily recorded it in three weeks once back in Vancouver. The tracks have a strong sexual imagery, bearing names like Sweet '69 and I (Fuck) Mountains. McBean claimed the Pink Mountaintops would drop the sexual sound for their next LP. The track 'Can You Do That Dance' was used in the UK TV advertisement for Beck's Vier lager (May 2007).

The song "Leslie" appears near the beginning of the Canadian indie movie Leslie, My Name Is Evil. The song also played a part in the film's title. The director, Reginald Harkema, was reading about the Charles Manson-instigated murders while repeatedly listening to this album. One of the people involved with the Manson family was Leslie Van Houten. He said he misheard the lyrics in the song as "Leslie, my name is evil" instead of the actual words, "Leslie, my name's not Eva." When he decided to make a movie about the Manson murders, he used this misheard lyric as its title.
