= McBrien =

McBrien is a surname of Irish origin that is an anglicization of Mac Briain ("son of Brian"). Notable people with the surname include:

- Fred McBrien (1888–1938), Canadian lawyer, businessman, and politician
- James McBrien (1869–1958), British police officer and detective
- Likely McBrien (1892–1956), leading Australian rules football administrator
- Richard McBrien (1936–2015), the Crowley-O'Brien Professor of Theology at the University of Notre Dame
- Scott McBrien (born 1980), former American football quarterback
- William C. McBrien (1889–1954), Canadian business owner and civic administrator

== See also ==
- Donnchad mac Briain (died 1064), son of Brian Bóruma and Gormflaith ingen Murchada, King of Munster
- William McBrien Building, the administrative headquarters of the Toronto Transit Commission
- MacBrien
