= In the Future (album) =

Studio album by Black Mountain
- Released: January 21, 2008
- Studio: The Factory Studios, Vancouver, BC; The Hive Creative Labs, Vancouver, BC; Sunset Sound, Los Angeles, CA; The Argyle Hotel
- Genre: Psychedelic rock, progressive rock, space rock
- Length: 57:03
- Label: Jagjaguwar
- Producer: Black Mountain; Dave Sardy ("Stay Free")

Black Mountain chronology
Black Mountain (2005)	In the Future (2008)	Wilderness Heart (2010)

Professional ratings
Review scores
Source	Rating
Allmusic	link
Crawdaddy!	(favorable) link
Drowned in Sound	link
musicOMH.com	link
Rolling Stone	3.5/5 stars
Stereogum	(not rated) 12/14/07
The Skinny	link
Q	Feb 08
Obscure Sound	(not rated) 11/28/07
Pitchfork Media	7.4/10 link
jambase.com	(not rated) link

In the Future is the second album by Black Mountain, which was released January 21, 2008. It follows their eponymous debut album which was released in 2005. A "limited edition" of the album was released on the same day with three bonus tracks on a second disc. It debuted on the UK Albums Chart at number 72.

The album art was designed by keyboardist Jeremy Schmidt, who was influenced by Storm Thorgerson's work.

The album was a nominee for the 2008 Polaris Music Prize.

Franz Nicolay, of The Hold Steady, listed the album as one of his favourite releases in 2008.

== Track listing ==
All music by Black Mountain; all lyrics by Stephen McBean, except "Night Walks" by Amber Webber.

1. "Stormy High" – 4:32
2. "Angels" – 3:07
3. "Tyrants" – 8:00
4. "Wucan" – 6:01
5. "Stay Free" – 4:29
6. "Queens Will Play" – 5:15
7. "Evil Ways" – 3:25
8. "Wild Wind" – 1:42
9. "Bright Lights" – 16:37
10. "Night Walks" – 3:55

== Disc 2 (Limited Edition version only) ==
1. "Bastards of Light" – 5:09
2. "Thirteen Walls" – 7:06
3. "Black Cat" – 2:51

== Personnel ==
Black Mountain

- Stephen McBean – vocals, acoustic guitar, electric guitar
- Amber Webber – vocals, percussion
- Jeremy Schmidt – organ, synthesizer, Mellotron, artwork
- Matthew Camirand – bass guitar
- Joshua Wells – drums, percussion, piano, Mellotron

Additional musicians

- Ryan Peters – backing vocals "Stormy High"
- Sean Hawryluk – backing vocals "Stormy High"
- The East Van Ladies' Chorus – backing vocals "Wild Wind"

Technical

- Dave Sardy – producer, engineer, mixing ("Stay Free")
- Sheldon Zaharko – engineer (disc one: tracks 1–3; disc two: track 1)
- Colin Stewart – engineer (disc one: tracks 4, 6–10; disc two: track 2)
- John Congleton – mixing (except "Stay Free")
- Greg Calbi – mastering

== Use in other media ==
"Stay Free" was used in both the second season of Showtime's Californication on the episode "Going Down and Out in Beverly Hills", and the film Spider-Man 3 (it was included on the soundtrack album, which was released on May 1, 2007, eight months before the release of "In The Future").
"Stormy High" was used in the 2012 videogame Spec Ops: The Line.
