= Anywhere (band) =

- Origin: Los Angeles, California, U.S.
- Genres: Psychedelic rock, psychedelic folk, progressive rock
- Years active: 2010–present
- Labels: ATP, Valley King, Org Music
- Spinoff of: Triclops!; The Mars Volta; At the Drive-In
- Website: valleykingrecords.wordpress.com

Anywhere is a psychedelic rock/folk music project from Los Angeles, California, founded by Christian Eric Beaulieu (formerly of Triclops!). Anywhere has featured a revolving door of musicians, including Cedric Bixler-Zavala, Mike Watt, Krist Novoselic, Dale Crover and Jonathan Hischke.

== Biography ==
=== First line-up ===
Anywhere began as a Los Angeles/San Francisco collaborative project started by Christian Eric Beaulieu and Cedric Bixler-Zavala (of The Mars Volta/At the Drive-in). Fresh off years of writing and touring as co-founder of Bay Area acid punk extremists Triclops!, Beaulieu decided to immerse himself in the resonant universe of acoustic guitar and began performing solo under the moniker Liquid Indian. In early 2010 while in Los Angeles to perform at an art opening of mutual friend artist Sonny Kay, he befriended Bixler-Zavala who was a DJ for the event. The two exchanged numbers and planned to record something acoustic rooted in the open tuning, eastern raga style Beaulieu was delving into. Months later the pair met in Los Angeles, enlisted the mobile engineering talent of Toshi Kasai (Big Business) and tracked the new material in two days at the Melvins practice space in downtown Los Angeles. During that same visit Beaulieu played live on The Watt from Pedro Show as the musical guest of Mike Watt (of The Stooges, Firehose, Minutemen).

After the show before leaving San Pedro, Beaulieu realized they needed bass for the recordings and asked Watt if he'd contribute. Watt agreed and a few months later delivered the entire project's bass tracks. Returning to San Francisco, Beaulieu decided to reach out to vocalist Rachel Fannan, who had recently parted ways with Bay Area psych rockers Sleepy Sun and had relocated to Los Angeles. Fannan contributed vocals to two of the songs, while Bixler-Zavala performed vocals on three tracks.

While searching for a label to release the album, Beaulieu solicited the talent of SF psychedelic poster artist Alan Forbes. During a meeting to discuss art concepts, Forbes revealed that he, along with his Secret Serpents business partner Justin Mcneal, had started a label called Valley King Records. They agreed to release a pair of singles as a series of limited edition silk-screened cover 7"s, all signed and hand numbered by Forbes. "Pyramid Mirrors" was released in November, 2011; the entire limited pressing of 500 sold out entirely on pre-order. The second 7", entitled "Infrared Moses", followed in March 2012.

On March 20, 2012, it was announced that the self-titled debut album by Anywhere will be released by All Tomorrow's Parties Recordings. It was first available exclusively as part of Record Store Day 2012 which took place on April 21 and was limited to 500 copies on 12" aqua coloured vinyl (with Download code). The regular CD, LP & digital releases followed on June 4 in the UK.

=== Second line-up ===
In 2013 a new, expanded line-up of Anywhere was formed, this time featuring Dale Crover (of the Melvins and Altamont), Krist Novoselic (of Nirvana and Sweet 75), Jonathan Hischke (of Dot Hacker, Hella and EV Kain), Bret Constantino and Matt Holliman (of Sleepy Sun), Ethan Miller (of Comets on Fire and Feral Ohms), Phil Manley (of Trans Am) and Cyrus Comiskey (of Drunk Horse and Howlin Rain) alongside Beaulieu and Kasai. The first release by the new line-up was Olompali EP, released by Valley King Records on a limited edition 12" picture disk with the art by Alan Forbes.

=== Third line-up ===
On August 26, 2014, Valley King Records announced a third line-up, including Cedric Bixler-Zavala, Mike Watt, Christian Beaulieu, Jonathan Hischke, Bret Constantino, Greg Rogove and others, with work on a new release being in pre-production stage.

In May 2018, an album entitled Anywhere II was released featuring Mike Watt, Dale Crover, and Krist Novoselic.

== Discography ==
=== Albums ===
- Anywhere (ATP Recordings, 2012)
- Anywhere II (Org Music/Atomicolor Records, April 2018) [Record Store Day First release]

=== Singles/EPs ===
- "Pyramid Mirrors" (b/w "Dead Golden West"; Valley King Records, November 2011 - 7" vinyl only pressing of 500)
- "Infrared Moses" (b/w "Anywhere"; Valley King Records, March 2012 - 7" vinyl only pressing of 500)
- "Olompali" (Valley King Records, October 2013 - 12" vinyl only pressing of 500)
- "Light the Portals" (Valley King Records, July 2016 - 7" vinyl only pressing of 300, box set edition of 75)
