= Outside Love =

Studio album by Pink Mountaintops
- Released: May 5, 2009
- Genre: Indie rock
- Length: 42:51
- Label: Jagjaguwar
- Producer: John Congleton

Pink Mountaintops chronology
Axis of Evol (2006)	Outside Love (2009)	Get Back (2014)

Outside Love is the third album by Pink Mountaintops, released by Jagjaguwar in 2009 and produced by John Congleton. Many critics listed it on The Georgia Straight's 'Top Ten Albums of 2009'.

== Reception ==
Professional ratings
Aggregate scores
Source	Rating
Metacritic	75/100
Review scores
Source	Rating
AllMusic	4/5 stars
The A.V. Club	A−
Drowned in Sound	6/10
NME	4/5 stars
Pitchfork Media	7.3/10

Outside Love received positive reviews from critics. On Metacritic, the album holds a score of 75 out of 100 based on 21 reviews, indicating "generally favorable reviews".

== Track listing ==
All tracks are written by Stephen McBean

No.	Title	Length
1.	"Axis: Thrones of Love"	4:50
2.	"Execution"	3:53
3.	"While We Were Dreaming"	3:55
4.	"Vampire"	3:52
5.	"Holiday"	3:22
6.	"Come Down"	2:09
7.	"Outside Love"	5:25
8.	"And I Thank You"	6:21
9.	"The Gayest of Sunbeams"	4:13
10.	"Closer To Heaven"	4:51

== Additional Information ==
- The song 'While We Were Dreaming' was used in the 2010 film Charlie St. Cloud.
