= William C. McBrien =

William Carson McBrien
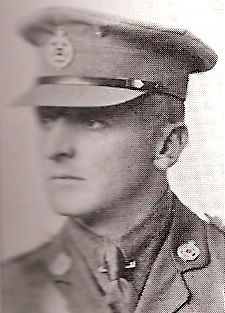
- McBrien c. 1917
- Born: 12 January 1889; Orangeville, Ontario, Canada
- Died: 18 June 1954 (aged 65); Toronto, Ontario, Canada
- Resting place: Prospect Cemetery
- Occupation: Businessman/Public Administrator
- Years active: 1904—1954
- Organization: Toronto Transportation Commission
- Known for: Modernizing the TTC and building Canada's first subway
- Title: Chairman
- Term: 1933—1954
- Political party: Conservative
- Spouse: Clara Doreen Case
- Relatives: Fred McBrien (brother)

William Carson McBrien (12 January 1889 – 18 June 1954) was a Canadian business owner and civic administrator. He was a long-serving chairman of the Toronto Transportation Commission and oversaw the construction of Canada's first underground rapid transit subway system in Toronto, Ontario.

== Biography ==
He was born in Orangeville, Ontario, and moved to Toronto as a young boy. He began a hardware business at age 15 with his older brother Fred, a future city council alderman and member of the Ontario Legislature. He served overseas with the Canadian Expeditionary Force in the Great War, rising to the rank of Major in the 12th Battalion, Canadian Railway Troops. On his return to Canada, he worked in the real estate business, and became active in civic affairs. He ran in Toronto Southwest B as a Conservative in the 1919 provincial election but lost to the Liberal John Ramsden. He served on the Toronto Board of Education as member and Chairman and later was appointed to the Toronto Harbour Commission. In 1930, he was appointed as one of three members of the Toronto Transportation Commission. He was Chairman of the TTC in 1931 to 1932 and then from mid-1933 to his death. During the Second World War, he served in Canada as a Lieutenant-Colonel, commanding a reserve unit of the Royal Canadian Engineers.

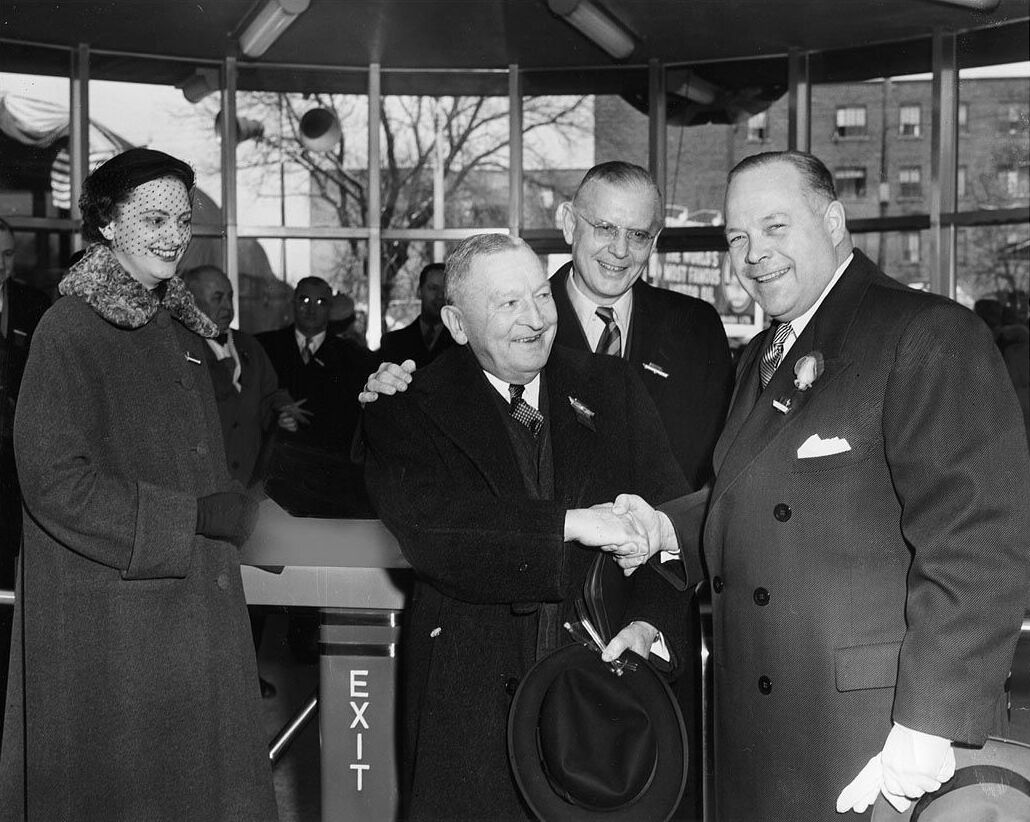
McBrien with Ontario Premier Leslie Frost and Toronto Mayor Allan Lamport at the opening of the Yonge Street Subway.

He guided the TTC through the difficult years of the Great Depression and the Second World War. He strongly supported the TTC's construction of Canada's first subway, which opened three months before his death. He was chairman during the transformation of the Toronto Transportation Commission from a local transit operator to a regional operator, the Toronto Transit Commission upon the formation of the Municipality of Metropolitan Toronto in 1954.

The TTC headquarters building at Davisville subway station, opened in 1958, is named the McBrien Building in his honour.

Preceded by S.J. McMaster	Chairman of the Toronto Transportation Commission/Toronto Transit Commission; 1933-1954	Succeeded by William G. Russll

Preceded by Frederick Langdon Hubbard	Chairman of the Toronto Transportation Commission/Toronto Transit Commission; 1931-1932	Succeeded by S.J. McMaster
