= Axis of Evol =

Studio album by Pink Mountaintops
- Released: March 7, 2006
- Recorded: 2005
- Genres: Indie rock, psychedelic folk
- Length: 34:38
- Label: Jagjaguwar

Pink Mountaintops chronology
Pink Mountaintops (2004)	Axis of Evol (2006)	Outside Love (2009)

Professional ratings
Aggregate scores
Source	Rating
Metacritic	75/100
Review scores
Source	Rating
AllMusic	3.5/5 stars
Pitchfork	8.1/10

Axis of Evol is the second album by Pink Mountaintops, released by Jagjaguwar in 2006. It was recorded in July 2005 at the Argyle Hotel and the Jackson Five House.

== Reception ==
Axis of Evol received positive reviews from critics. On Metacritic, the album holds a score of 75 out of 100 based on 14 reviews, indicating "generally favorable reviews".

== Track listing ==
All songs written by Stephen McBean.

1. "Comas" - 2:53
2. "Cold Criminals" – 4:39
3. "New Drug Queens" – 1:47
4. "Slaves" – 8:52
5. "Plastic Man, You're the Devil" – 3:52
6. "Lord, Let Us Shine" – 5:05
7. "How We Can Get Free" – 5:05
