= Charles B. Dolphin =

British-Canadian architect (1888–1969)

- Born: 3 March 1888; Ashton-under-Lyne, Lancashire
- Died: 28 June 1969 (aged 81); Toronto, Ontario
- Spouse: Doris Alexandrine Stovel (m. 1918)

Charles Brammall Dolphin (3 March 1888 – 28 June 1969) was a British-Canadian architect who designed various buildings in Toronto, most notably the Toronto Postal Delivery Building (now incorporated into the Scotiabank Arena).

Born in Ashton-under-Lyne, England, Dolphin immigrated to Canada.

Dolphin at the Toronto Ski Club in 1929

He was married to Doris Alexandrine Stovel and had several children: William (died as infant), Flight Lieutenant Douglas Dolphin, RCAF (d. 1944) and Nancy Jane Dolphin (1937–2002), Robert Dolphin and Shirley Dolphin.

He died in Toronto in 1969.

== Works ==
Name	Year	Address	Status
St. Andrew's Presbyterian Church	1926	24 Stavenbank Road, Port Credit	
The Clarendon	1926	2 Clarendon Avenue, Toronto	
Bay-Adelaide Garage Limited	1927	65 Adelaide Street W, Toronto	demolished ca. 1973
Solloway, Mills & Co. Building	1929	108-112 Yonge Street, Toronto	demolished ca. 1960
Consumers' Gas Showroom	1930	2532 Yonge Street, Toronto	
Toronto Ski Club clubhouse	1930	11901 Yonge Street, Richmond Hill	
Toronto Coach Terminal	1931	610 Bay Street, Toronto	
Fulpart Building (CHUM studios, later McClear Place Studio)	1946	225 Mutual Street, Toronto	demolished 2010
Toronto Postal Delivery Building	1947		east and south façades incorporated into Scotiabank Arena
Bay-Grosvenor Building	1948	880 Bay Street	demolished 2016
Austin Ontario Motors Limited dealership	1949	737 Church Street, Toronto	demolished
International Harvester Company of Canada sales and service building	1951	2336 St Clair Avenue W, Toronto	
Bloor–Yonge station	1954	20 Bloor Street E, Toronto	
Arthur Meighen Building (Postal Station Q)	1954	25 St Clair Avenue E, Toronto	façade removed in 2019
William McBrien Building	1956	1900 Yonge Street, Toronto	
The War Amps Building	1959	140 Merton Street, Toronto	

== Personal ==
Dolphin was married to Doris Alexandrine LeGendre Stovel had several children (Nancy Jane Dolphin (1937–2002), William Dolphin, Flight Lieutenant Douglas Dolphin (d. 1944), Robert Dolphin and Shirley Dolphin).

== Gallery ==
=== Executed works ===
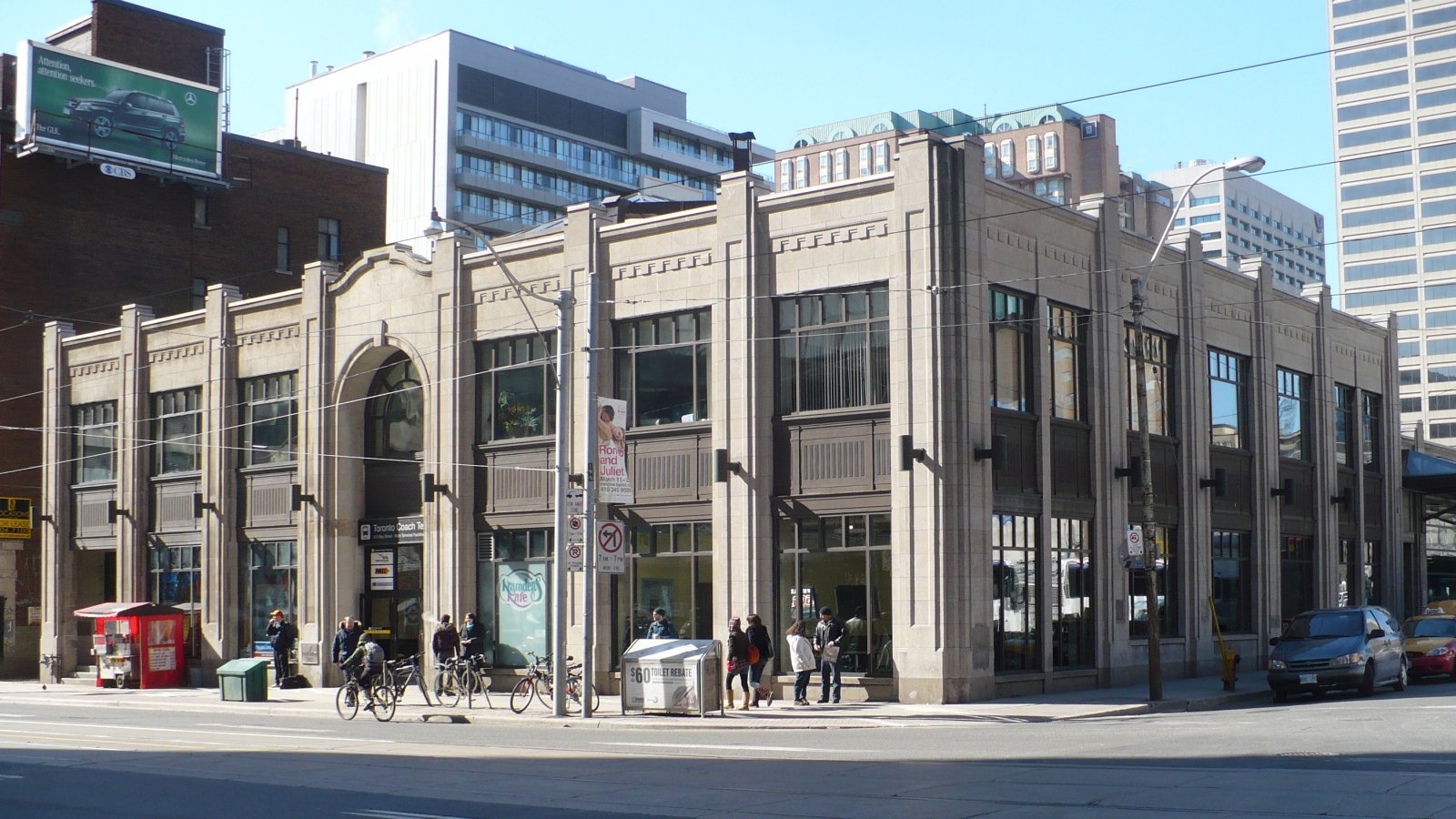
The Gray Coach Terminal, 1931

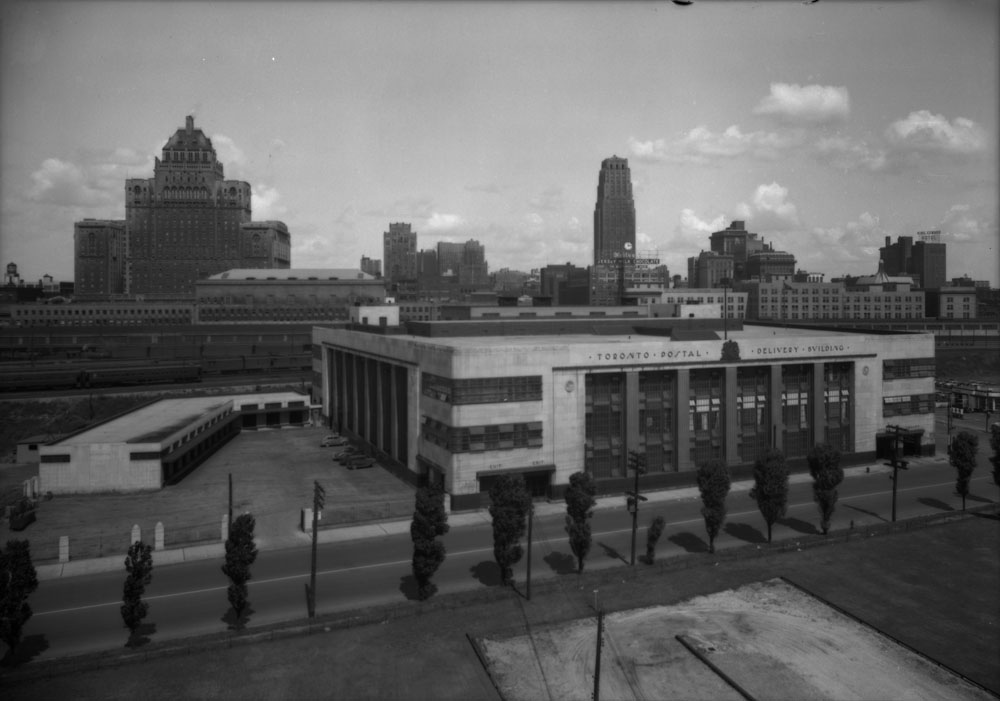
The Toronto Postal Delivery Building (1939), now part of Scotiabank Arena

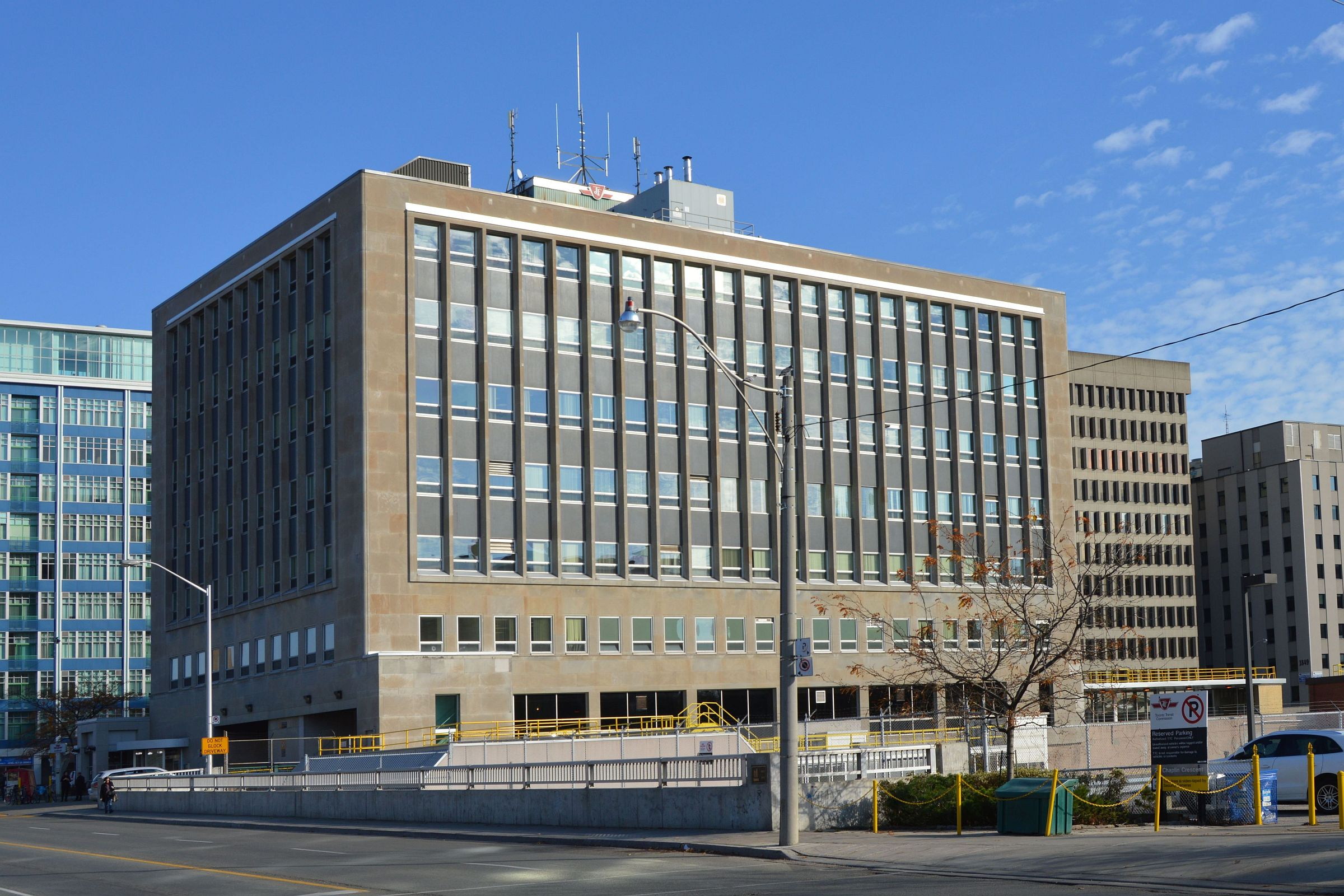
The William C. McBrien Building (1957)

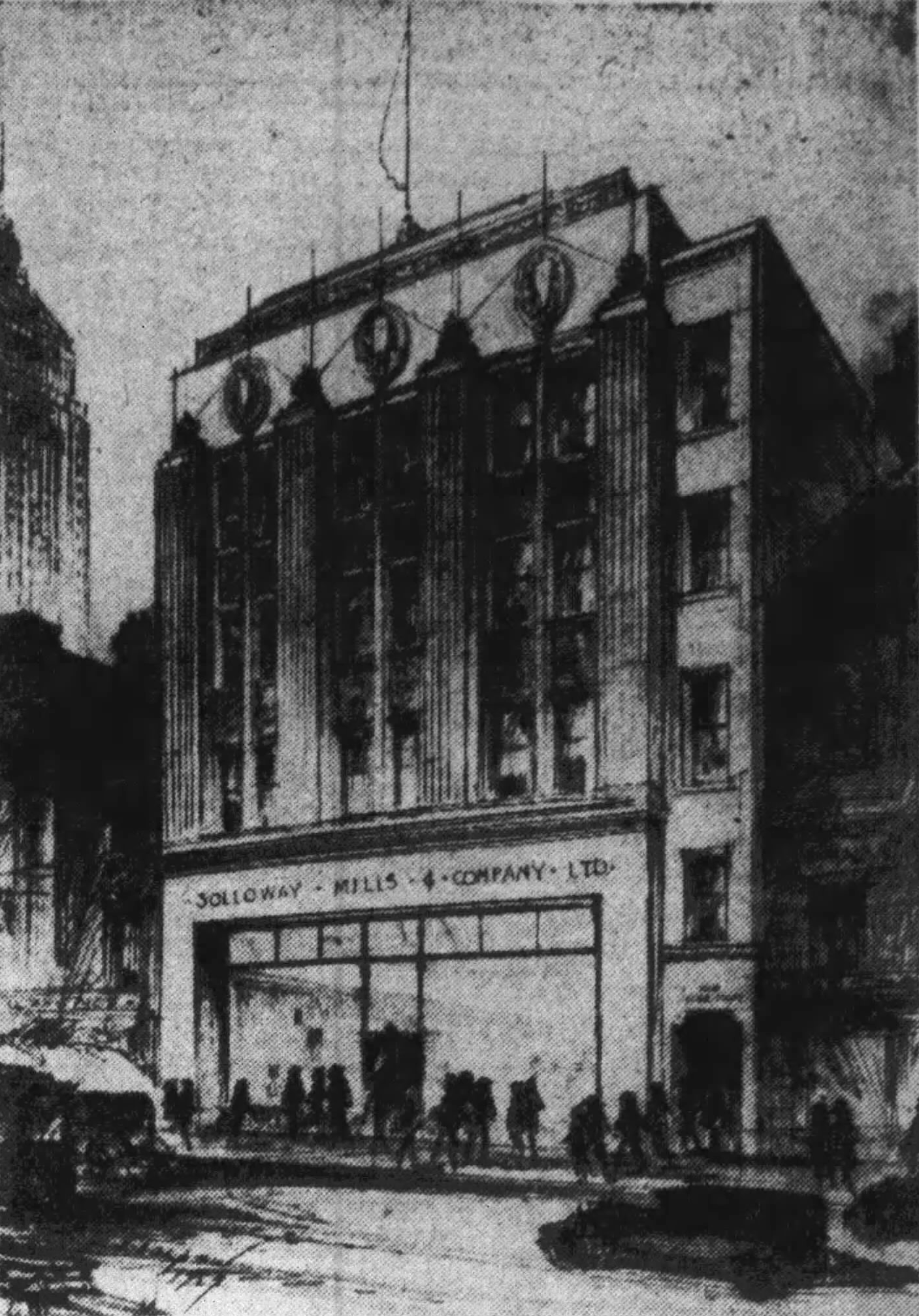
Solloway, Mills & Co. Building

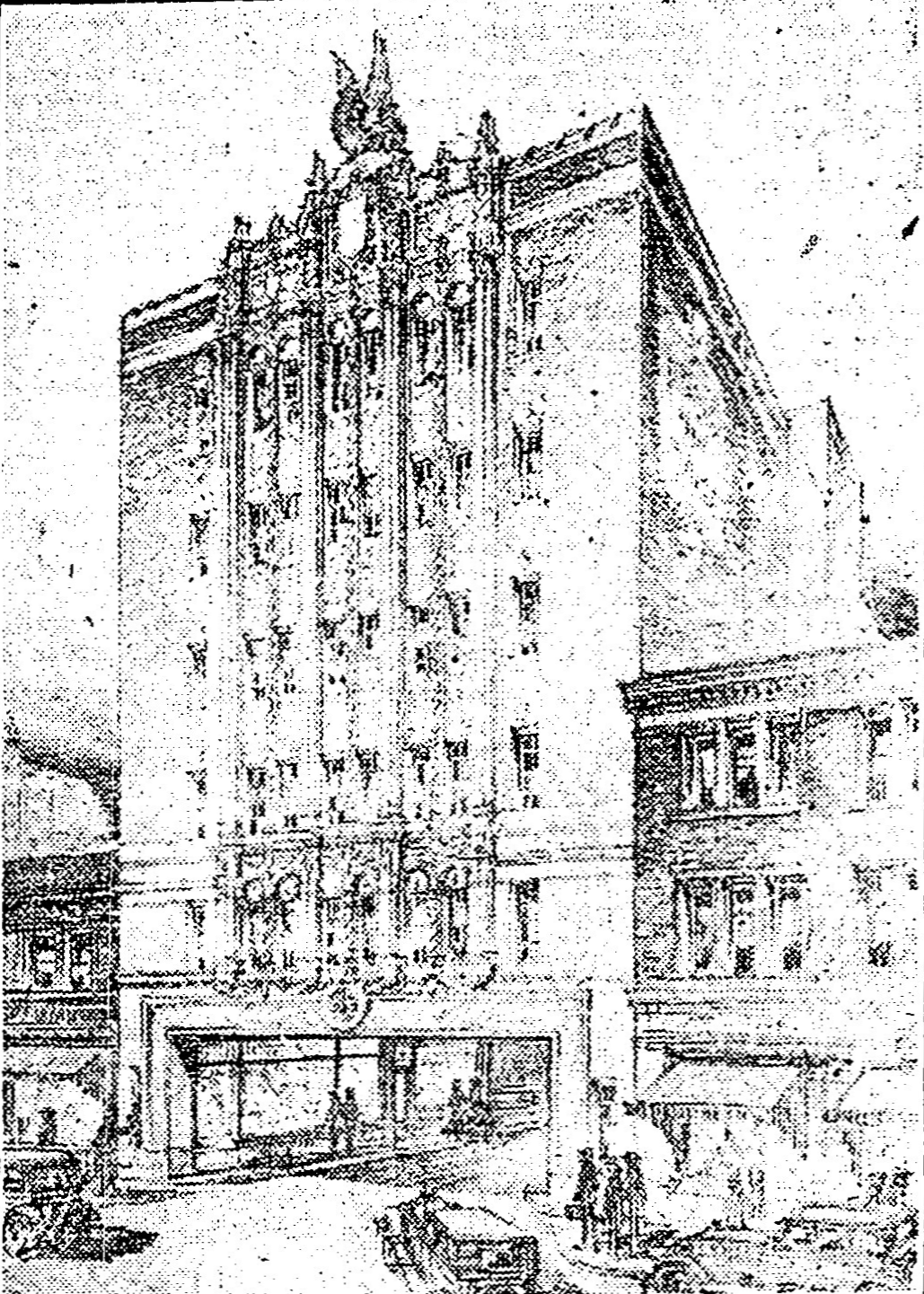
Bay-Adelaide Garage

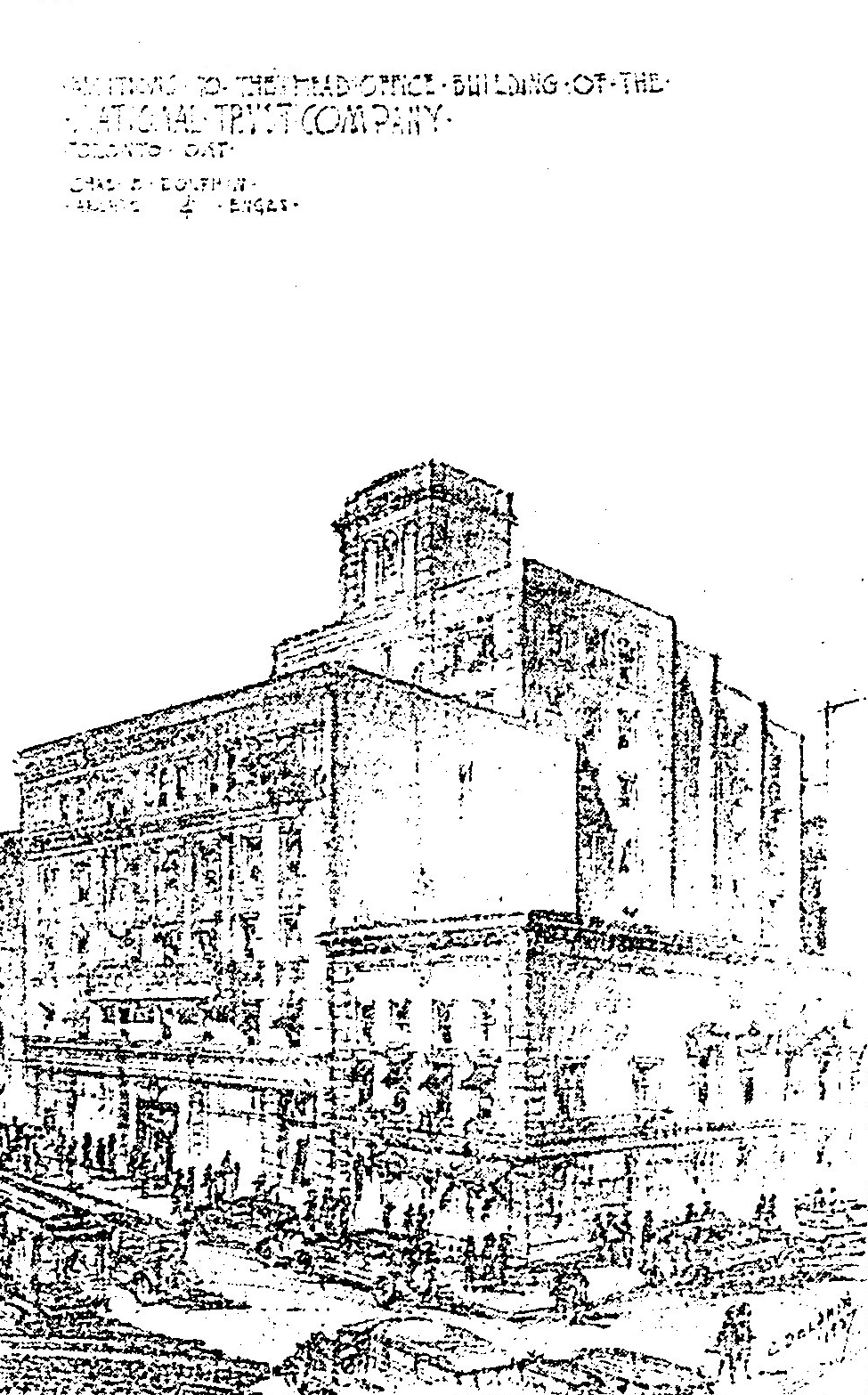
National Trust headquarters addition

=== Unexecuted works ===
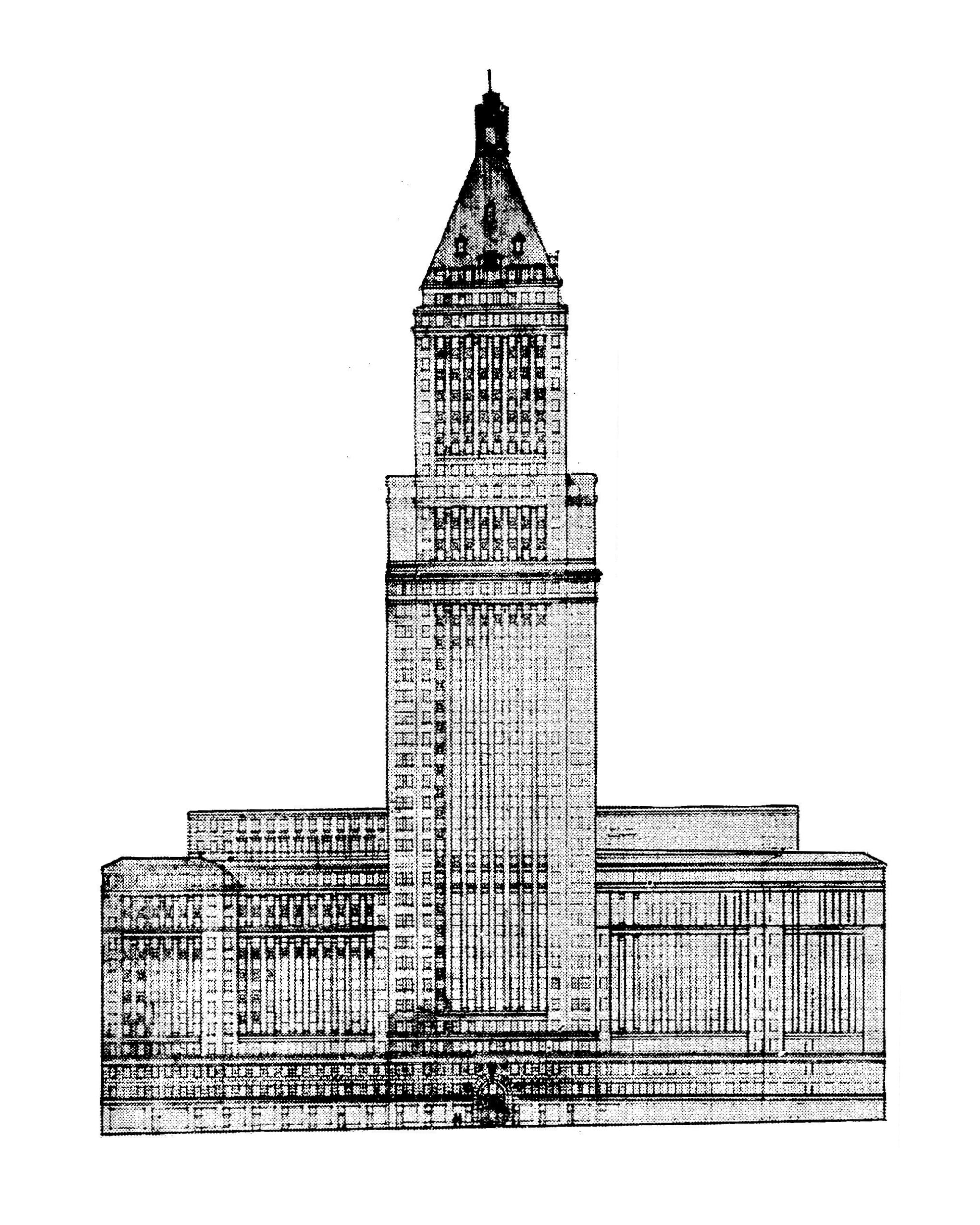
Toronto Towers

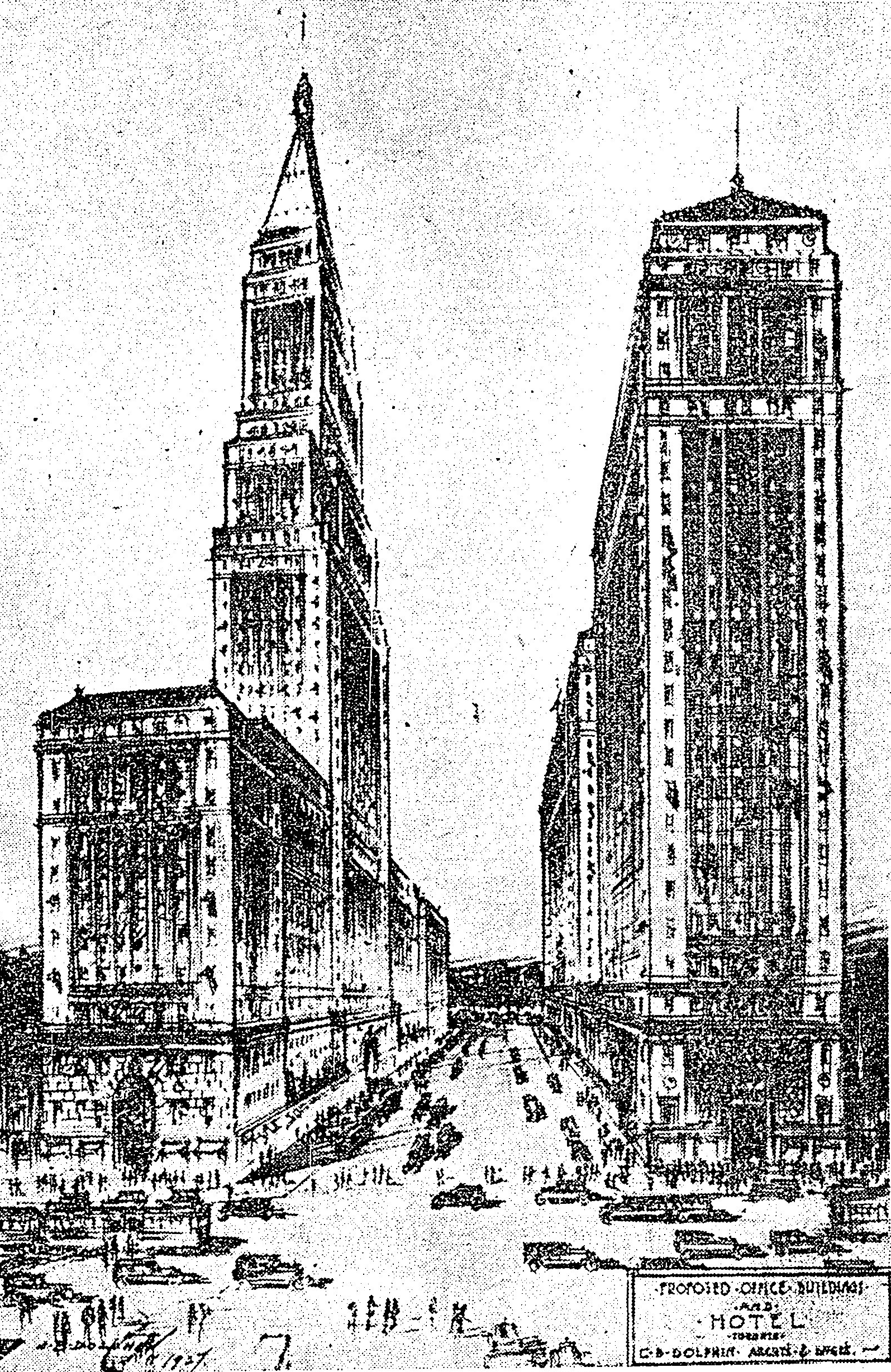
Toronto towers perspective

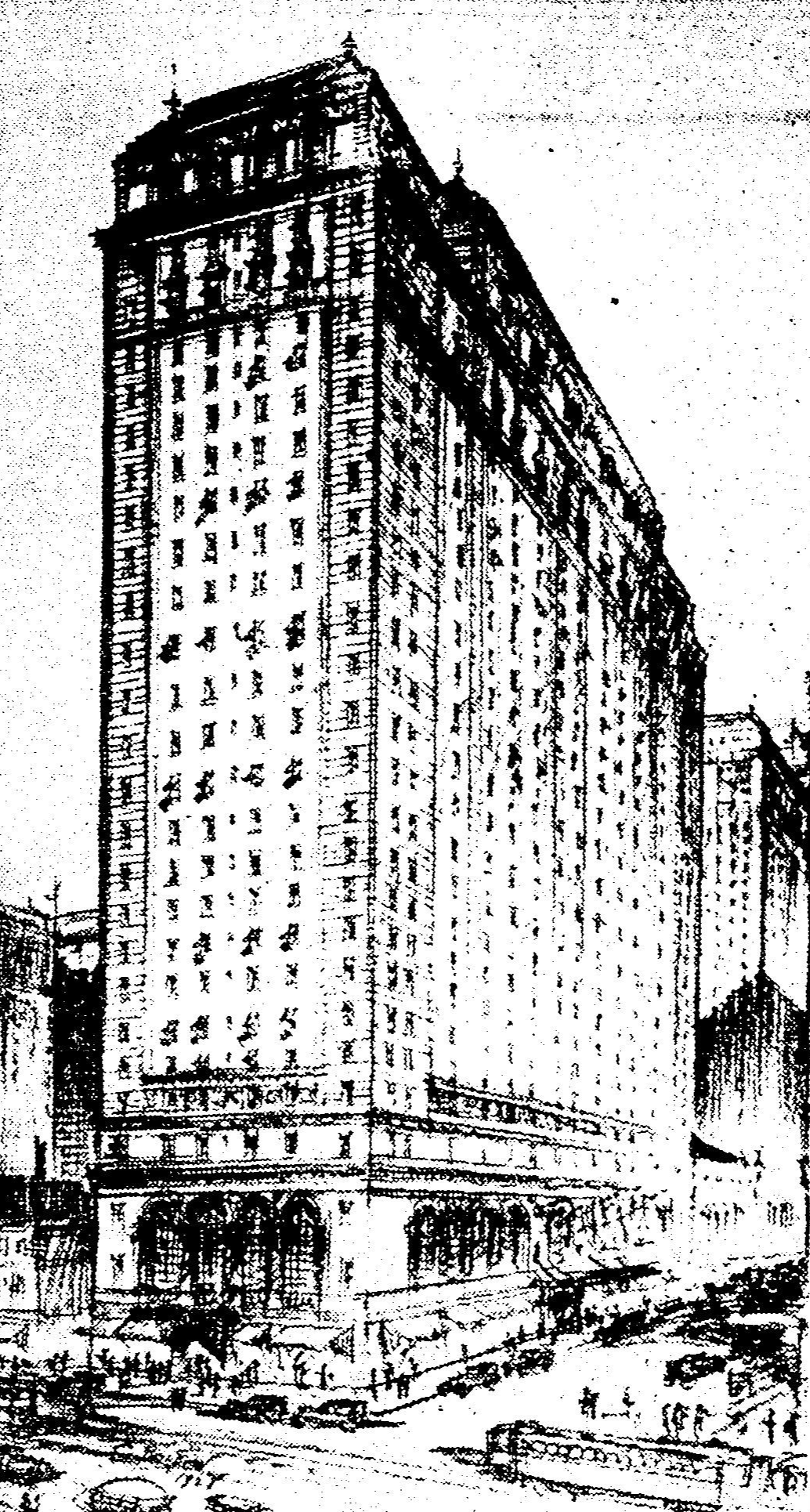
Toronto Towers hotel

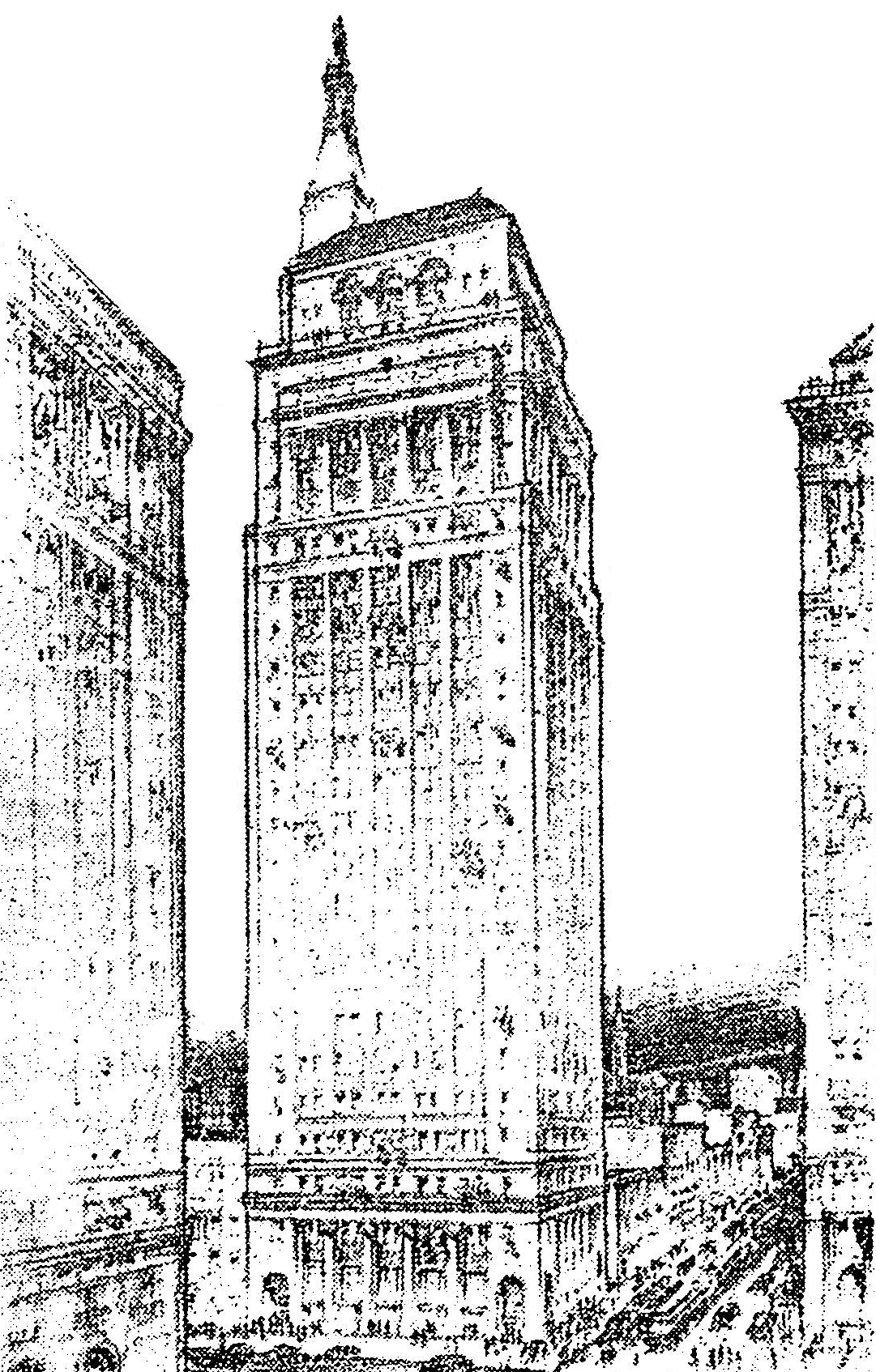
Tower at northwest corner of Yonge and King

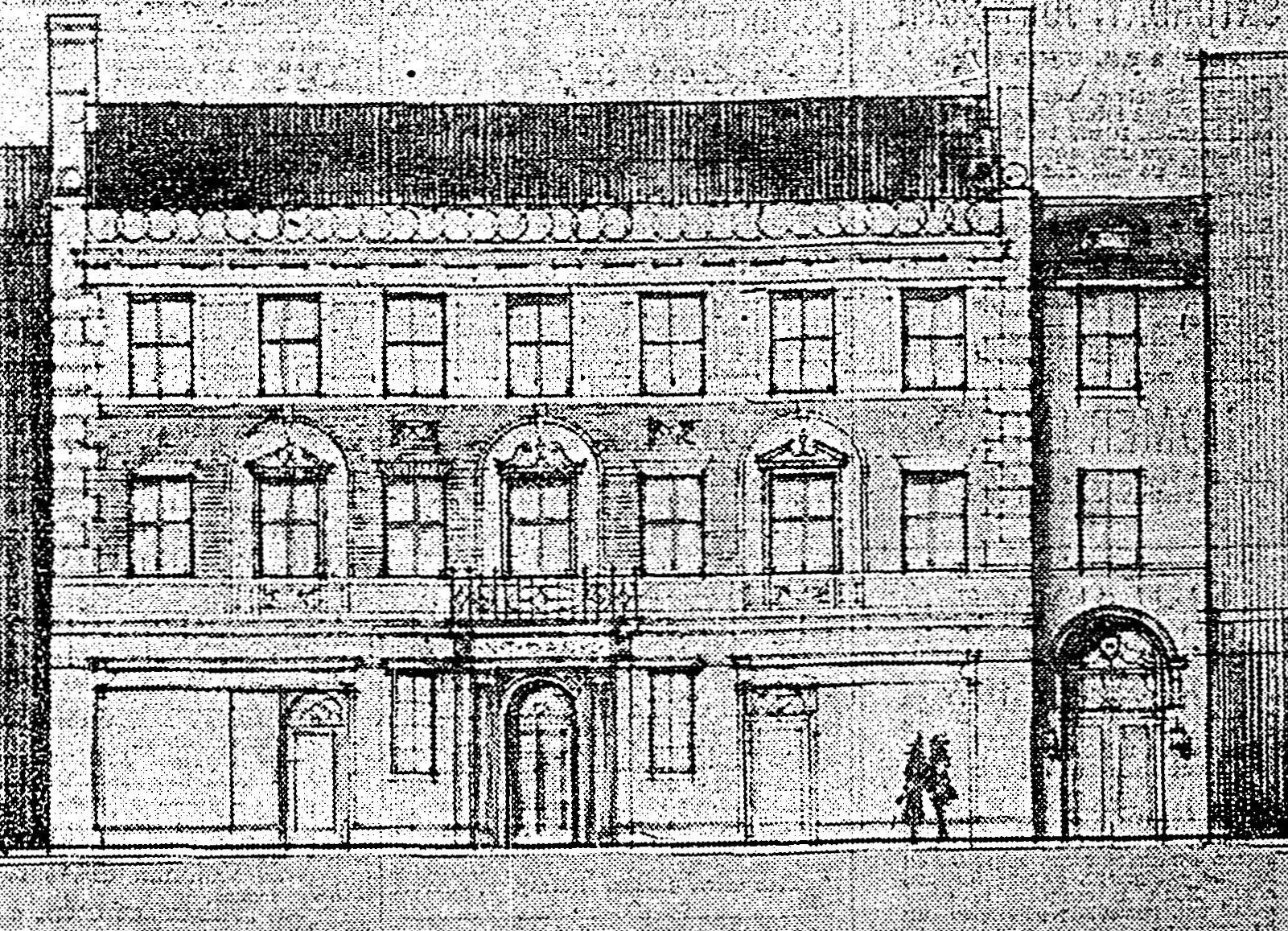
Robins Limited, Yonge Street at Granby
