= Darryl Brown (West Indian cricketer) =

West Indian cricketer (born 1973)

Personal information
- Born: 18 December 1973 (age 52); McBean, Trinidad
- Batting: Right-handed
- Bowling: Right-arm medium

Career statistics
Competition	ODI
Matches	3
Runs scored	10
Batting average	10.00
100s/50s	0/0
Top score	9
Balls bowled	25
Wickets	5
Bowling average	24.80
5 wickets in innings	0
10 wickets in match	0
Best bowling	3/21
Catches/stumpings	0/–
- Source: CricInfo, 6 March 2006

Darryl Brown (born 18 December 1973) is a former West Indian cricketer who played three One Day Internationals in 2001–02. He was born at McBean, Trinidad.
