= Get Back (Pink Mountaintops album) =

Studio album by Pink Mountaintops
- Released: April 29, 2014
- Recorded: Los Angeles, 2013
- Genres: Alternative rock, indie rock
- Length: 41:34
- Label: Jagjaguwar
- Producer: Joe Cardamone

Pink Mountaintops chronology
| Outside Love (2009) | Get Back (2014) |

Professional ratings
Aggregate scores
| Source | Rating |
|---|---|
| Metacritic | 74/100 |
Review scores
| Source | Rating |
| AllMusic | 4/5 stars |
| Drowned in Sound | 6/10 |
| Exclaim! | 7/10 |
| MusicOMH | 4/5 stars |
| Pitchfork | 4.9/10 |
| PopMatters | 8/10 stars |

Get Back is the fourth studio album released by the Canadian band Pink Mountaintops on April 28, 2014, through Jagjaguwar Records. It features a guest appearances by J. Mascis and Annie Hardy.

The album was a longlisted nominee for the 2014 Polaris Music Prize.

== Track listing ==
All tracks are written by Stephen McBean.

| No. | Title | Length |
|---|---|---|
| 1. | "Ambulance City" | 5:02 |
| 2. | "The Second Summer of Love" | 3:56 |
| 3. | "Through All the Worry" | 3:21 |
| 4. | "Wheels" | 3:25 |
| 5. | "Sell Your Soul" | 3:48 |
| 6. | "North Hollywood Microwaves" | 5:01 |
| 7. | "Sixteen" | 2:44 |
| 8. | "New Teenage Mutilation" | 3:18 |
| 9. | "Shakedown" | 3:18 |
| 10. | "The Last Dance" | 7:41 |
