= William McBrien Building =

Administrative Building

McBrien Building
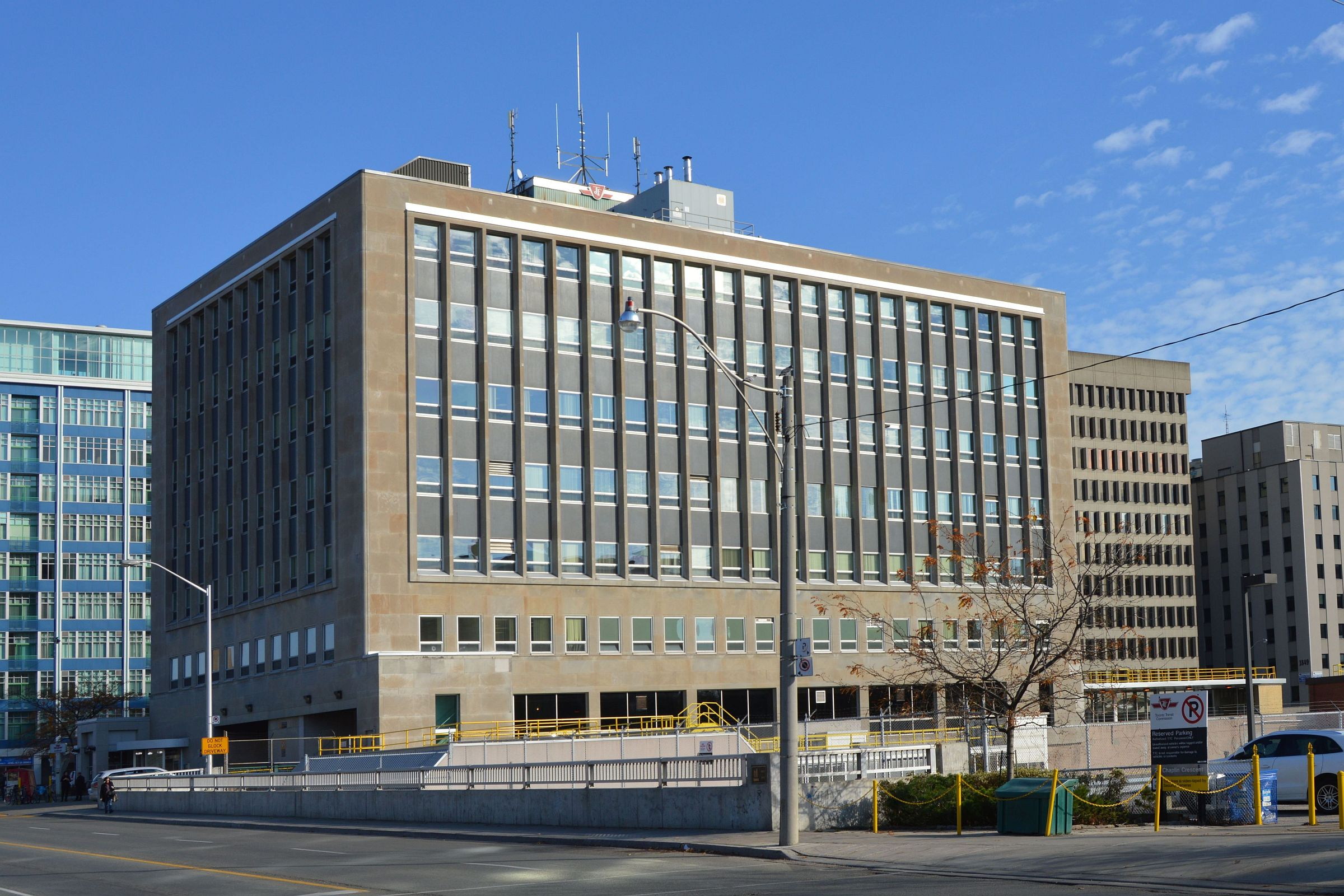

General information
- Architectural style: Modernist
- Location: 1900 Yonge Street, Toronto, Ontario, Canada
- Coordinates: 43°41′52″N 79°23′48″W
- Current tenants: Toronto Transit Commission
- Opened: 1958
- Owner: City of Toronto

Technical details
- Floor count: 7

Design and construction
- Architect: Charles B. Dolphin

William McBrien Building (formally known as the W. C. McBrien Building) is the administrative headquarters of the Toronto Transit Commission. Designed by Charles B. Dolphin (1888-1969) and opened on February 7, 1958, the seven-storey building is located at 1900 Yonge Street above the Davisville subway station. The building is named for former TTC Chairman William C. McBrien who died in June 1954, shortly after the opening of the Yonge Subway. The TTC's Customer Service Centre is located on the ground floor of the building.

The building is 28 metres (92 ft) wide, 50 metres (163 ft) long and contains 11,000 square metres (120,000 sq ft) of floor space. Its exterior is made of limestone quarried at Queenston, Ontario. The main-floor lobby is lined with light brown Italian marble. The building incorporates an entrance to Davisville subway station located below street level as well as bus bays at ground level. The building design allows for expansion from its current seven storeys to ten storeys.

Prior to the opening of the McBrien Building, the TTC head office was in the old Toronto Board of Trade Building (built 1890 and demolished 1958) located at the north-east corner of Yonge and Front streets. This was the TTC's first permanent home since April 1922. The TTC outgrew the old building with its limited floor space, and starting in 1928, the TTC had to acquire space elsewhere. Starting in 1953, functions such as purchasing, safety, research, engineering, among others were moved to the J.G. Inglis Building at the Hillcrest Complex. In 1958, the executive, legal and treasury functions moved to the McBrien Building.

== Relocation ==
In 2015, the TTC considered relocating from the building because of ongoing concerns about the state of the building and for head office staff to be in one location. Earlier plans to relocate to Yonge and York Mills had been rejected for costs. As of 2022, the TTC plans to move its headquarters out of the building in 2025, with a TTC master control centre remaining there until 2028. The move would consolidate office space and free up municipally owned property for redevelopment. The city of Toronto intends to preserve the heritage aspects of the building.

Besides 1900 Yonge, the TTC leases seven other locations to house head office staff.
