= MacBrien =

MacBrien is an Irish surname. Notable people with the surname include:

- Sir James Howden MacBrien, Canadian general
  - Mount Sir James MacBrien, a mountain peak named after Sir James MacBrien
- W. A. H. MacBrien, Canadian hockey executive
- William Ross MacBrien, Canadian air marshal

== See also ==
- McBrien
