= James McBean =

Scottish footballer

Personal information
- Full name: James Learmont McBean
- Place of birth: Scotland
- Position: Full back

Senior career*
| Years | Team | Apps | (Gls) |
| –1905 | Inverness | | |
| 1905–1909 | Ayr | 18 | (7) |
| 1909–1913 | Queen's Park | 70 | (0) |
| 1912 | → Kilmarnock (loan) | 0 | (0) |
| 1913–1914 | Stevenston United | | |
- * Club domestic league appearances and goals

James Learmont McBean was a Scottish amateur footballer who played as a full back in the Scottish League for Queen's Park.

== Personal life ==
McBean was a medical student. He served as a captain in the Royal Army Medical Corps in India during the First World War.
