= Anywhere (Anywhere album) =

Studio album by Anywhere
- Released: April 21, 2012 (RSD exclusive); June 4, 2012 (UK); July 24, 2012 (USA)
- Recorded: 2010–2011
- Genres: Psychedelic rock, psychedelic folk, progressive rock
- Length: 40:38
- Label: ATP Recordings
- Producers: Christian Eric Beaulieu, Toshi Kasai

Anywhere chronology
Anywhere (2012)	Anywhere II (2018)

Singles from Anywhere
- 1. "Pyramid Mirrors" Released: November 2011; 2. "Infrared Moses" Released: March 2012

Professional ratings
Review scores
Source	Rating
Alternative Press	4/5 stars
Drowned in Sound	6/10 stars
NY Daily News	4/5 stars
Paste	(7.7/10)
Sputnik Music	4/5 stars

Anywhere is the first full-length studio album by American psychedelic rock/folk project Anywhere. Limited edition vinyl (500 copies) was released by ATP Recordings on April 21, 2012 exclusively for Record Store Day, while widespread CD and LP releases followed on June 4 in the UK and July 24 in the United States.

According to the band's bio on ATP Recordings site, "the music captured on this material is an ethereal, resonant execution of what could be described as eastern acoustic punk. Likened to the voyeurism of Sandy Bull, Sir Richard Bishop, or Jack Rose style raga's reinterpreted at times with Drive Like Jehu, Minutemen punk velocity, other moments emotionally spiraling toward a haunting, ethereal beauty akin to Vashti Bunyan lost in the desert of a desolate western. Blending acoustic and minimal electric guitars with a multitude of percussion instrumentation, digital tabla machines, sci-fi electronics and feedback, this avant garde collective of envelope pushing splatter artists have created a new presence. Modern mantras of electric silence that fuse consciousness into a recording of vibrant, transitional material, blending geographic as well as cultural diversity. The sound of stillness amidst chaos, light below the depths, dancing full circle into the center of what could only be called Anywhere".

== Track listing ==
All music is composed by Christian Eric Beaulieu.

No.	Title	Lyrics	Length
1.	"Pyramid Mirrors"		5:37
2.	"Rosa Rugosa"	Rachel Fannan	6:08
3.	"Khamsin"	Cedric Bixler-Zavala	7:31
4.	"Dead Golden West"	Fannan	5:11
5.	"Anywhere"	Bixler-Zavala	5:53
6.	"Shaman Mantra"	Bixler-Zavala	6:19
7.	"Infrared Moses"		4:00

== Personnel ==
Anywhere

- Christian Eric Beaulieu – guitars, bass, percussion, electronics
- Cedric Bixler-Zavala – vocals (3,5,6), drums, percussion, electronics
- Mike Watt – bass
- Rachel Fannan – vocals (2, 4)
- Toshi Kasai – keys

Engineering

- Toshi Kasai – recording and mixing engineer
- Phil Becker, Mike Watt, Evan Weiss – additional recording
- Justin Weiss – mastering

Artwork

- Sonny Kay – album art, design
- Alan Forbes – logo
- Christina Bixler – photos
