= McBee =

McBee is a surname. Notable people with the surname include:

- Cecil McBee (born 1935), American jazz musician
- Deron McBee (born 1961), American actor
- Lee McBee (1951–2014), American blues musician and singer
- Pryor McBee (1901–1963), American baseball player
- Rives McBee (1938–2023), American golfer
- Thomas Page McBee (born 1981), American author
- Vardry McBee (1775–1864), American businessman, philanthropist and city founder

== See also ==
- McBee, South Carolina
- Royal McBee, early computer manufacturer
- McBee cards, pre-electronic technique for data storage and retrieval
