= Davisville station =

Toronto subway station

Davisville
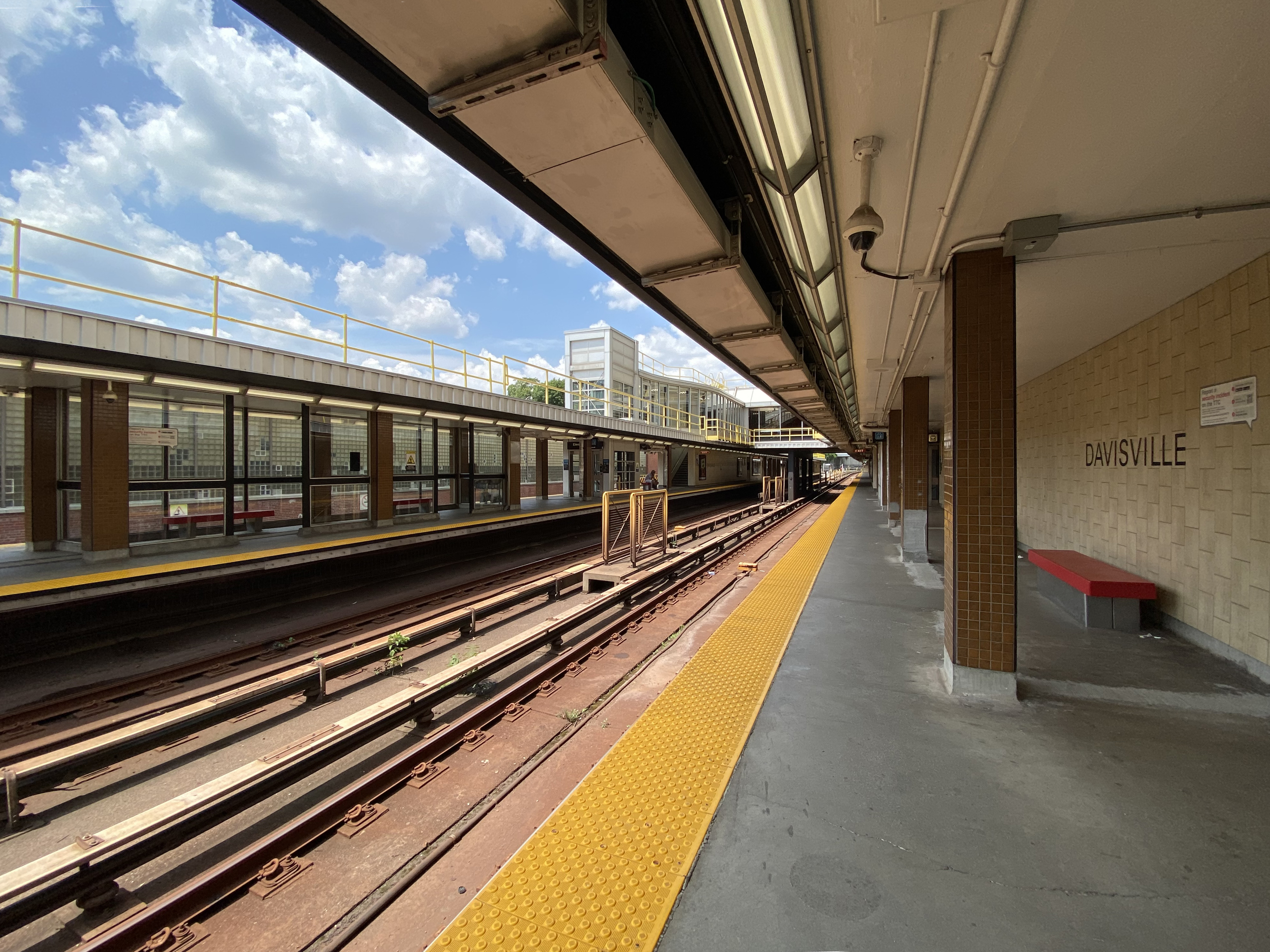

General information
- Location: 1900 Yonge Street; Toronto, Ontario; Canada
- Coordinates: 43°41′53″N 79°23′50″W
- Platforms: Centre platform Side platform
- Tracks: 3
- Connections: TTC buses: 11 Bayview; 14 Glencairn; 28 Bayview South; 97 Yonge; 320 Yonge

Construction
- Structure type: Above ground
- Accessible: Yes

Other information
- Website: Official station page

History
- Opened: 30 March 1954; 72 years ago

Passengers
- 2023–2024: 15,903
- Rank: 47 of 70

Services
Preceding station	Toronto Transit Commission	Following station
St. Clair towards Vaughan	Line 1 Yonge–University	Eglinton towards Finch
Location

Davisville is a subway station on Line 1 Yonge–University in Toronto, Ontario, Canada. It is located at 1900 Yonge Street, where it intersects with Chaplin Crescent and Davisville Avenue. The station opened in 1954 as part of the original Toronto subway. In 2002, this station became accessible with elevators.

== Description ==
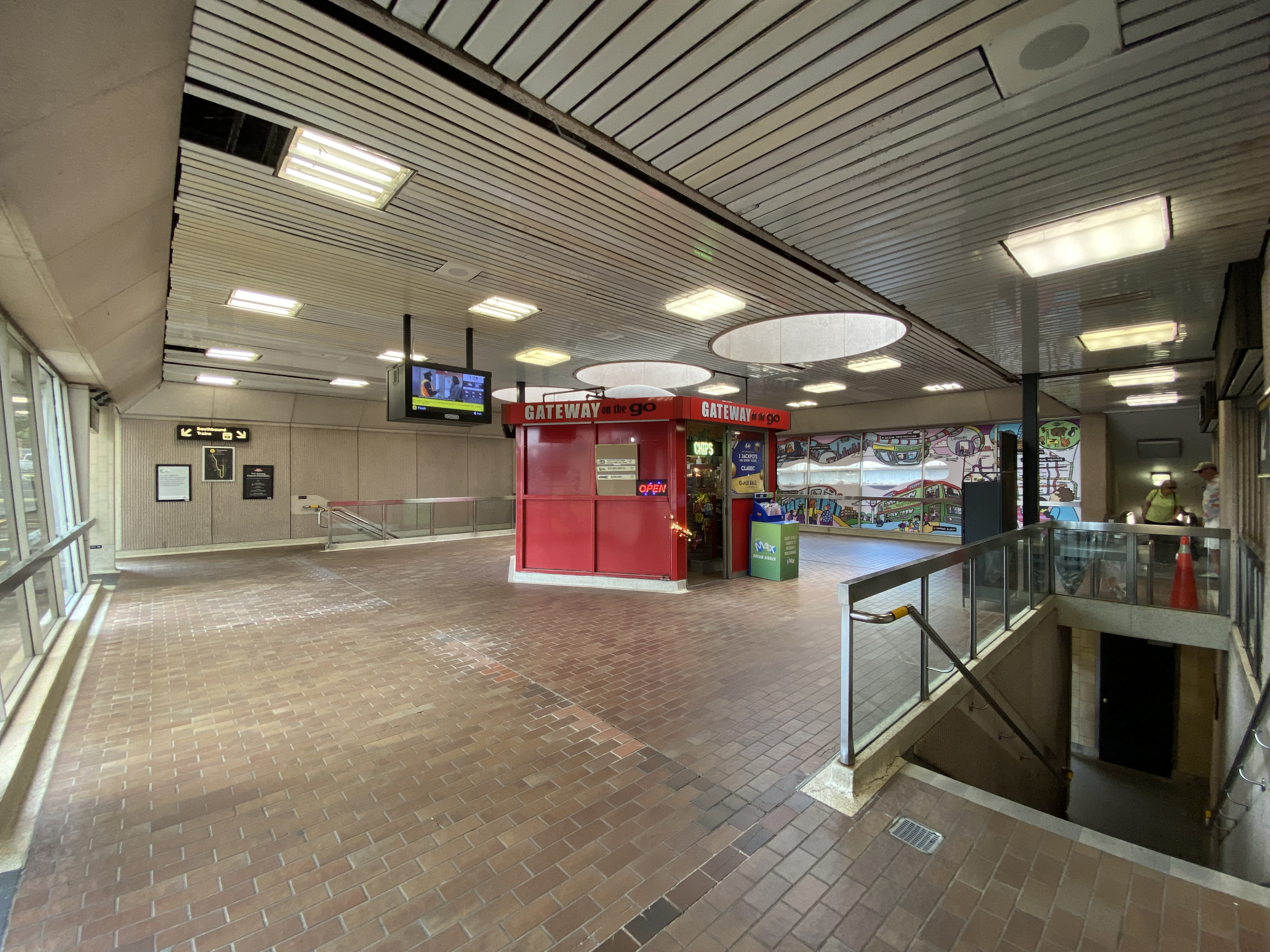
Concourse

The station is on three levels: the entrances are located on street level, the concourse and collector booths are on the mezzanine (second) level, and the subway platforms are on the lower level.

There are four entrances that connect the station to two buildings in the area:

- three accessible entrances from the TTC head office
- an unstaffed entrance at 1910 Yonge Street, near Chaplin Crescent, which leads directly to the northbound subway platform

In 2021, an artwork titled 100 Years with the TTC was installed in the mezzanine level of the station to celebrate the 100th anniversary of the TTC. Working with STEPS Public Art, an organization that develops public art installations, artist Rosena Fung designed the work using contributions by 12 school students, the winners of a contest to depict futuristic vehicles.

== Subway infrastructure in the vicinity ==
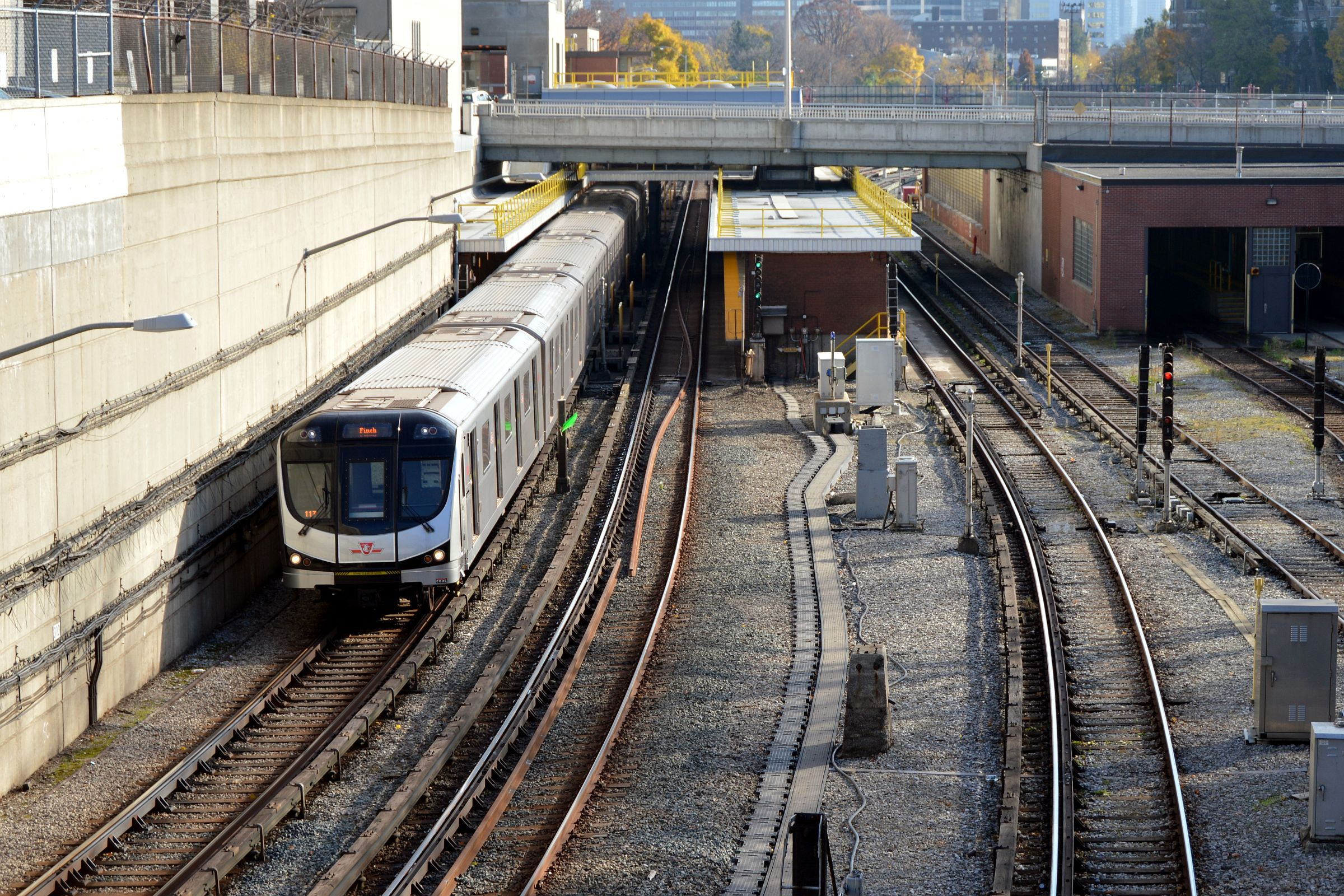
Northbound Toronto Rocket train, with Chaplin Crescent crossing above

The station is constructed above ground, but below street level, with separate canopies over each platform. It is adjacent to the Davisville Subway Yard, which is visible from the trains and platforms. The station has a unique semi-active third platform, on the yard side - actually referred to as the Davisville Buildup - which can be used by trains entering or leaving the yard on service or as an alternate route if one of the running lines is blocked.

The line continues in open cut in both directions: north as far as the Berwick Portal, immediately before Eglinton station; and south as far as the Muir Portal, roughly halfway to St. Clair station, from which it continues in tunnel.

== Nearby landmarks ==
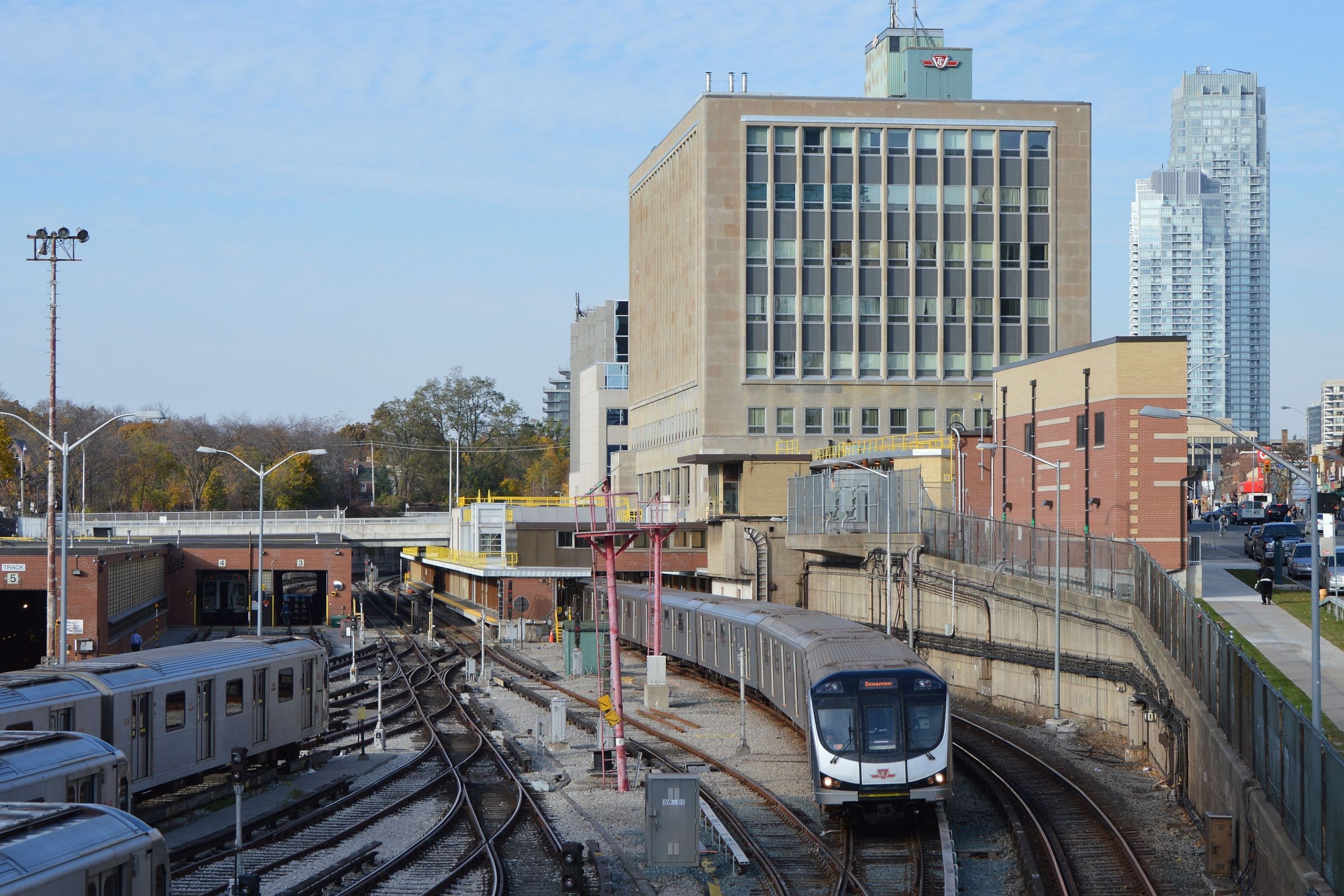
Looking north at Davisville Yard, Davisville subway station, McBrien Building and a Toronto Rocket train departing southbound

Nearby landmarks include the Mount Pleasant Cemetery, the Upper Canada College campus, and the TTC's main administrative office building, the William McBrien Building. The station's bus platforms are under the western half of the building at the street-level garage, and the open-air northbound subway platform abuts against the building's west wall.

The former Canadian National Railways Belt Line Railway railway corridor crosses over the subway tracks south of the station. It has been converted into a pedestrian and biking trail, called the Beltline Trail.

== Surface connections ==
TTC routes serving the station include:

Route	Name	Additional information
11A	Bayview	Northbound to Steeles Avenue East via Leaside station and Sunnybrook Hospital
11B	Bayview	Northbound to Lawrence station via Leaside station and Sunnybrook Hospital
14	Glencairn	Westbound to Caledonia Road via Chaplin station and Glencairn station
28	Bayview South	Southbound to Evergreen Brick Works
97A	Yonge	Northbound to Steeles Avenue and southbound to St. Clair station (On-street stop outside station)
97B	Yonge	Northbound to Steeles Avenue via Yonge Boulevard and southbound to St. Clair station via Yonge Boulevard (On-street stop outside station)
97C	Yonge	Northbound to Eglinton station and southbound to Union station (Rush hour service; on-street stop outside station)
