= Rachel Fannan =

American singer-songwriter

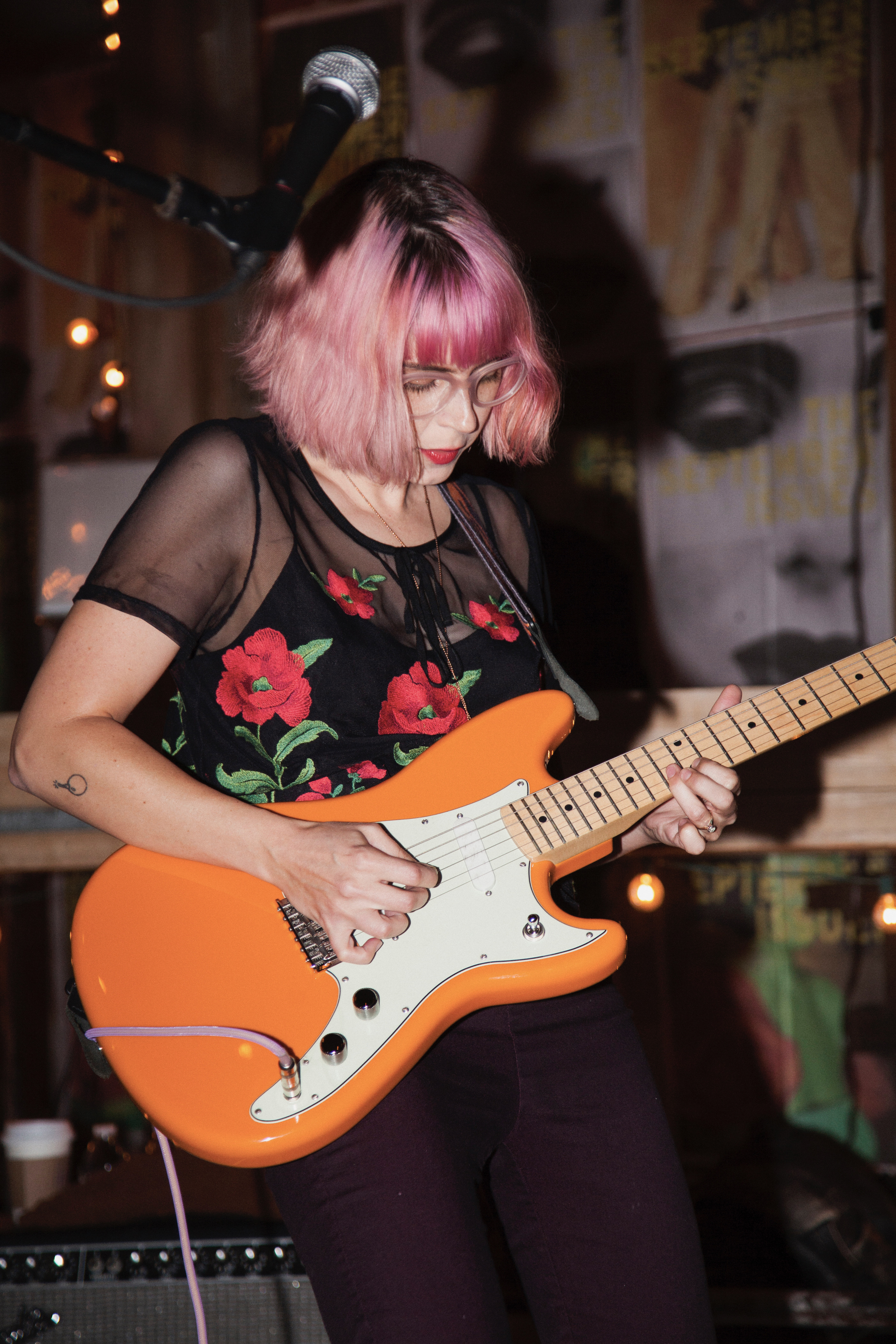
- Rachel Fannan in 2017
- Born: Rachel Marie Williams; March 20, 1986 (age 40); Thousand Oaks, California
- Occupations: Singer; songwriter; poet
- Years active: 2008–present
- Spouse: Samuel Child (m. 2017; div. 2018)
- Parents: Michael Glenn Williams (father); Marlene Longamore (mother)
- Relatives: Michael Gaelen Williams (brother), Caitlin Elizabeth Williams (sister)
- Musical career
- Genres: Pop; rock; jazz; folk
- Instruments: Vocals; keyboard; guitar; drums; bass
- Years active: 2008–present

Rachel Fannan (born March 20, 1986) is an American singer, songwriter, musician and poet from Los Angeles, California. She made her musical debut in 2008, with the release of a solo album entitled Deeper Lurking, under the moniker Birds Fled from Me. She is best known as the lead vocalist of the band Only You, and formerly as co-lead vocalist of San Francisco psych-rockers Sleepy Sun, as well as for collaborations with UNKLE and progressive rock band Anywhere. She has also recorded and toured with the Canadian rock band, Black Mountain, and spent 2019 drumming for the Russian group Pussy Riot.

As a solo artist, Fannan has shared the stage with other prominent musicians such as Hunter Burgan (AFI), Carla Azar (Autolux), Rich Good (Psychedelic Furs), and Dash Hutton (Haim and Mini Mansions).

== Early life ==
Fannan was born in Thousand Oaks, California. She is the eldest daughter of composer and pianist Michael Glenn Williams and Marlene Marie Longamore. She has a younger brother, Michael Gaelen Williams, and a younger sister, Caitlin Elizabeth Williams.

Fannan spent much of her childhood encouraged to sing and perform; she later recalled acquiring a key to her school's choir room, where she would often eat her lunch and play the piano. She attended Ascension Lutheran, a private preparatory school in Thousand Oaks, and she graduated from Newbury Park High school class of 2004. She abstained from musical performances throughout high school, devoting most of her time to extra curricular clubs and activities. She then briefly attended Santa Monica City College, before dropping out to move to Santa Cruz, California.

== Birds Fled from Me ==
Between 2005 and 2008, Fannan wrote and recorded solo material under the moniker Birds Fled from Me. With producer/engineer Maxwell Lewis Golding, she released a lo-fi album entitled Deeper Lurking in 2008.

== Sleepy Sun ==
In 2007, while performing in Santa Cruz, California, Fannan was invited to sit in with psych rockers Sleepy Sun, and was quickly recruited to be their co-lead vocalist. Her vocals are featured on the band's first two albums Embrace (ATP Recordings, 2009) and Fever (ATP Recordings, 2010); both albums, recorded with producer Colin Stewart at the Hive in Vancouver, British Columbia, do not physically credit Fannan. Fannan left the band due to mental health reasons in late October 2010.

== Collaborations ==
During and soon after leaving Sleepy Sun, Fannan recorded with British trip-hop duo UNKLE. Her first collaboration "Follow Me Down" is credited as a Sleepy Sun feature, but primarily features Fannan, her lyrics, and melody. "Sunday Song", also featuring Fannan, was released as part of their Only the Lonely EP, and Where Did the Night Fall – Another Night Out album.

Following a short stint supporting Dinosaur Jr. frontman J Mascis, Fannan was approached by Christian Eric Beaulieu (Triclops!) to collaborate on the musical project Anywhere, which also included Mike Watt (Minutemen, The Stooges) and Cedric Bixler-Zavala (The Mars Volta, At the Drive-In). Fannan sang lead vocals on their debut single "Dead Golden West" (Valley King Records, November 2011) and on the song "Rosa Rugosa" on their self-titled debut Anywhere (ATP Recordings, 2012).

In late 2012, she toured as keyboard player and backing vocalist for The Fresh & Onlys.

In 2018, Rachel Fannan was approached by guitarist and Entrance Band frontman Guy Blakeslee to join him on drums.

In 2019, she was invited to record and tour on Canadian rock band Black Mountain's 5th full-length album Destroyer and is heavily featured. Later that same year she was then also invited to drum for international art movement group Pussy Riot.

== Only You ==
Created in late 2010, Only You is Fannan's Los Angeles based rock band, whose lineup included a rotating cast of backing musicians.

In early 2012, the band began performing as an all-woman group, with Fannan being joined by bassist Micayla Grace (Bleached, Leopold and His Fiction), guitarist Cecilia Peruti (Gothic Tropic), and drummer Lia Braswell (Le Butcherettes). Only You released their first single "Applying Myself" through White Iris Records in October 2012. The b-side "Love Is Making Me Tired" was featured as a Daily Download on Rolling Stone's website. In 2015 Fannan later released another single through a different label Hit City U.S.A as Only You, "Let Me Burn", the B-side to this was "The Pressure".

Other musicians that have previously played with the group include Amy Aileen Wood (Fiona Apple), Jon Sortland (Cigar, Broken Bells), Rich Good (Kings & Queens, Psychedelic Furs), Evan Weiss (Slang Chickens, Wires on Fire), Dash Hutton (Slang Chickens, Wires on Fire, Papa), lead guitarist Brandon Intelligator (Slang Chickens), Jeff Lynn (Wires on Fire), Patrick Taylor (Ceremonies), Lucas Ventura, and Wade Ryff.

== Other work ==
In 2012, a version of Stephen Foster's classic parlor song "Beautiful Dreamer", featuring Fannan on vocals, was used in a commercial by Canon, which went on to win the award for Outstanding Commercial at the 2012–2013 Creative Arts Primetime Emmys.

In 2016, she released an EP, Everybody's Famous, as The Bomb.

In 2017, she published her first book of original poetry, No One Wants to Give Up.

In 2018, she was a featured vocalist on Devil May Cry 5's "Crimson Cloud", with composer Jeff Rona.
