= Black Mountain (band) =

Canadian psychedelic rock band

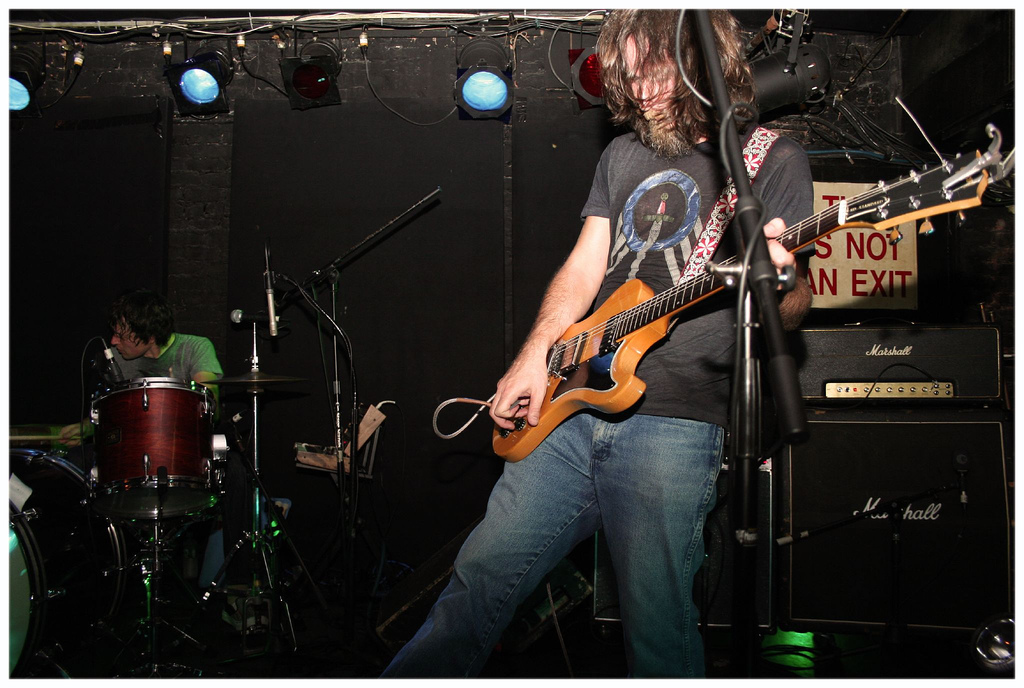
- Black Mountain performing in 2007

Background information
- Origin: Vancouver, British Columbia, Canada
- Genres: Psychedelic rock; stoner rock; space rock; progressive rock; alternative rock
- Years active: 2004–present
- Labels: Jagjaguwar; Outside Music; Low Transit Industries
- Members: Stephen McBean; Jeremy Schmidt; Adam Bulgasem; Arjan Miranda; Amber Webber
- Past members: Matt Camirand; Joshua Wells; Rachel Fannan
- Website: www.blackmountainarmy.com

Black Mountain is a Canadian psychedelic rock band from Vancouver, British Columbia. The band is composed of Stephen McBean, Jeremy Schmidt, Adam Bulgasem, Amber Webber, and Arjan Miranda. Since forming in 2004, Black Mountain has released five LPs, Black Mountain (2005), In the Future (2008), Wilderness Heart (2010), IV (2016) and Destroyer (2019); two EPs and a number of singles, mostly on the Jagjaguwar label.

== Overview ==
=== Early career ===
Stephen (Gord) Gordon McBean (b. 1969), was born in Vancouver and grew up in Kleinburg and Sidney, British Columbia. As a teenager he became interested in music and became part of the local punk-rock scene in Victoria. He formed his first band, Jerk Ward, in 1981. In 1984, the band recorded a demo that was re-released in 2009 as Too Young To Thrash. The band evolved into Mission of Christ (MOC) who recorded a split 7-inch in 1987. Two years later the band broke up and McBean moved to Vancouver where he started the band Gus. They released two singles, a split EP and an album The Progressive Science of Breeding Idiots for a Dumber Society (1995). The band gave McBean his first experience with extensive touring and he later described the experience as a "bit of noise, bit of Melvins, funk, the Amrep stuff that was going on then. Lots of screaming. Lasted four years".

In 1996, McBean asked drummer Joshua Wells (Radio Berlin) to join his band Ex Dead Teenager. By 1999, it had morphed into a duo of Wells and McBean as Jerk With a Bomb. They signed with Scratch Records and Jagjaguwar in the U.S., and released three albums: Death to False Metal (1999), The Old Noise (2001) and Pyrokinesis (2003). The latter featured Amber Webber of Dream on Dreary on vocals.

=== Black Mountain ===
While McBean and Wells were still performing as Jerk With a Bomb in 2003, McBean began to demo material that included the song "Black Mountain". At the start of 2004, the two began working on the demos under the same name with contributions from Webber, bassist Matt Camirand and keyboard player Jeremy Schmidt. They recorded the eight track, self-titled debut album during the first half of the year. McBean would later describe the change as "it was almost like a release. I mean, I loved Jerk With A Bomb, but it got to a point where I was done with it, I was through with that part of my life".

The first release under the new name was a split 7-inch with Destroyer that featured the song "Bicycle Man". The album was released through Scratch Records in Canada in December 2004, while Jagjaguwar put it out a month later. The band toured around North America and Europe, while in June the 12-inch single "Druganaut" b/w "Buffalo Swan" was released in the U.S. In August 2005, the band opened for Coldplay on their Twisted Logic Tour for three weeks, with their final opening in San Diego. In the same month the album was released in Germany through City Slang Records.

A vinyl single was released in April 2007, named "Surrender Sound Session: Unkle vs. Autolux/Black Mountain" with a remix of "No Hits" on the B side.

Their second album In the Future was a finalist for the 2008 Polaris Music Prize and was also nominated for "Best Alternative Album" in the 2009 Juno Awards. The song "Stay Free" from In the Future was featured on the Spider-Man 3 soundtrack.

In September 2010, Black Mountain performed in an amphitheater located in the woods of Oisterwijk at the Incubate (festival) in Tilburg, Netherlands.

Leader Stephen McBean also heads another similarly named band, Pink Mountaintops, while Webber performs with the band Kodiak Deathbeds and Lightning Dust.

Several members of the band have, for as long as a decade, worked for organizations that meet the basic living requirements of the chronically poor, drug addicted and mentally ill in Vancouver's Downtown Eastside neighborhood, such as Insite. In an interview, the band said: "After work we all try not to think too hard about the effect it has on our lives. It keeps us grounded."

In 2010, McBean moved to Los Angeles. The band released their third album Wilderness Heart in September 2011, which was produced by Randall Dunn and Dave Sardy. It was named as a longlisted nominee for the 2011 Polaris Music Prize, and appeared on the !earshot Top 50 chart.

On April 1, 2016, they released their fourth studio album, IV. A fifth studio album, Destroyer, was released on May 24, 2019. "Let Spirits Ride" was featured in an episode of the ABC network television show, The Rookie, in March 2019. "Future Shade" featured on Sportsnet's Hockey Night in Canada in May 2019. In August 2019, the band played Palp Festival on a mountain in Switzerland as well as Sziget Festival in Budapest, Hungary.

== Discography ==
=== Studio albums ===
- Black Mountain (2005)
- In the Future (2008)
- Wilderness Heart (2010)
- IV (2016)
- Destroyer (2019)

=== Soundtrack ===
- Year Zero: The Original Soundtrack (2012)

=== EPs ===
- Stormy High (2006, Suicide Squeeze)
- Bastards of Light (2008, Jagjaguwar)
- Lucy Brown (2008, Sub Pop)
- Rollercoaster b/w In the Drones (26/4/2011, Jagjaguwar)
- Echoes (2021, Jagjaguwar)

=== Singles ===
- Quiet Weather Singles Series (2004, Spirit of Orr - split release with Destroyer)
- "Druganaut" (2004, Jagjaguwar)
- "The Hair Song" (2010, Jagjaguwar)
- "Old Fangs" (2010, Jagjaguwar)
- "Rollercoaster" (2011, Jagjaguwar)
- "Future Shade" (2019, Jagjaguwar)
- "Boogie Lover" (2019, Jagjaguwar)
- "Licensed to Drive" (2019, Jagjaguwar)
