= IV (Black Mountain album) =

Studio album by Black Mountain
- Released: April 1, 2016
- Genre: Alternative rock, progressive rock, psychedelic rock, space rock
- Length: 56:14
- Label: Jagjaguwar
- Producer: Black Mountain

Black Mountain chronology
Year Zero: The Original Soundtrack (2012)	IV (2016)	Destroyer (2019)

Professional ratings
Aggregate scores
Source	Rating
Metacritic	75/100
Review scores
Source	Rating
Allmusic	4/5 stars
Classic Rock	3.5/5 stars
Consequence of Sound	B
Exclaim!	7/10
Pitchfork Media	7.5/10
PopMatters	8/10 stars
Uncut	4/5 stars
NPR	Positive
No Ripcord	7/10 stars
Under the Radar	7/10 stars

IV is the fourth studio album by Canadian rock band, Black Mountain, released on April 1, 2016. The five-and-a-half year gap between two studio albums is the longest to date. It is also the band's first album of new work since their 2012 soundtrack album for Year Zero.

== Track listing ==
No.	Title	Length
1.	"Mothers of the Sun"	8:34
2.	"Florian Saucer Attack"	3:24
3.	"Defector"	4:02
4.	"You Can Dream"	5:32
5.	"Constellations"	4:01
6.	"Line Them All Up"	3:54
7.	"Cemetery Breeding"	4:10
8.	"(Over and Over) The Chain"	8:48
9.	"Crucify Me"	4:45
10.	"Space to Bakersfield"	9:04
Total length:		56:14

== Charts ==
Chart (2016)	Peak position
Belgian Albums (Ultratop Flanders)	117
Belgian Albums (Ultratop Wallonia)	122
German Albums (Offizielle Top 100)	97
Scottish Albums (OCC)	86
Swiss Albums (Schweizer Hitparade)	44
UK Independent Albums (OCC)	18
US Independent Albums (Billboard)	31
US Indie Store Album Sales (Billboard)	7
US Top Rock Albums (Billboard)	46
US Vinyl Albums (Billboard)	12
