= Sleepy Sun =

American rock band

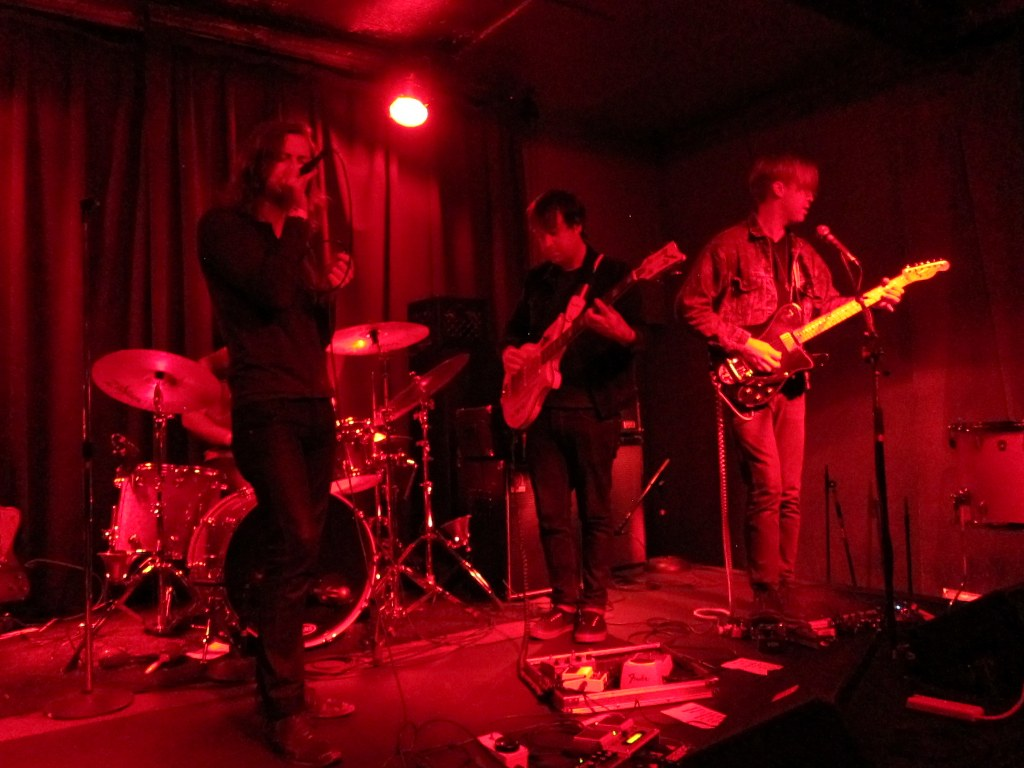
- Sleepy Sun in 2013

Background information
- Also known as: Mania (2005–2007)
- Origin: Santa Cruz, California, United States
- Genres: Psychedelic rock, stoner rock
- Years active: 2005–2019
- Labels: Dine Alone Records; ATP Recordings
- Spinoffs: Fine Points
- Past members: Bret Constantino; Matt Holliman; Evan Reiss; Brian Tice; Rachel Fannan; Jack Allen; Hubert Guy
- Website: sleepysun.co

Sleepy Sun was an American psychedelic rock band, formed in Santa Cruz, California and later based in San Francisco. They released five studio albums before quietly disbanding in 2019.

== Biography ==
Sleepy Sun formed as Mania in 2005 at UC Santa Cruz by students Bret Constantino, Matt Holliman, Evan Reiss, Brice Tice and original bass player Hubert Guy. Holliman, Reiss and Tice all lived on the same floor during their freshman year. The band progressed from their original garage rock stylings into psychedelia, and changed their name to Sleepy Sun in 2007, with the addition of former Birds Fled from Me singer Rachel Fannan. The band set to work on their debut Embrace in 2008 which they self released via their own record label/publishing company Sol Diamond, and received favorable reviews. Shortly after the release of the album, Guy left the band and was replaced by new bass player Jack Allen. The album was re-issued by ATP Recordings on June 16, 2009. The band toured heavily throughout 2009 in support of the album, with their live show becoming a subject of acclaim. In March 2010, they embarked on a tour of the United States, opening for the English rock band Arctic Monkeys. They were personally asked to support Arctic Monkeys, after the girlfriend of the band's bassist heard a song on a covermount CD and got the band to listen to it.

The band released their second album, Fever on June 1, 2010. The album was recorded in Vancouver, Canada in April 2009 with producer Colin Stewart who also worked on the band's debut album. Holliman commented that "Fever and Embrace were written back to back. After recording Embrace we moved to San Francisco and started writing the tracks that would eventually arrive on Fever. This writing took place before Embrace was officially released by ATP and before we started touring full time. So if there's a feeling of continuity between the two, it's simply because there was little to no time between their inception". Fannan departed the band mid tour citing mental health reasons. In late October, she released a press release in which she cited a lack of input into the band's creative process and conflicts with other band members as the reasons for her departure. She stated that "I had a fun time with them for the first year but after several attempts to contribute my ability to play keys, or write music were ignored I gave up hope and started drinking more. There's a whole year and a half of my life I barely remember."

The band declined to comment on her departure, but Constantino later stated that "She's a really beautiful person in a lot of ways. I learned a lot about myself." Fannan returned to Los Angeles where she formed the band Only You and began a career in voice acting. In 2011, Sleepy Sun went on tour with The Black Angels.

The band released their third album Spine Hits on April 10, 2012. Aside from Still Breathing, the album was recorded in seven days at Hicksville Trailer Park and Rancho De La Luna in Joshua Tree with producers Ethan Allen and Dave Catching. Catching had previously guested on the band's previous album, laying down a guitar solo on V.O.G.. The first album without Fannon, Constantino commented that after her departure "We kind of went through a transitional phase for about a year, and the record is a part of that transition to adapting to life without Rachel. We always wrote the songs without Rachel so that wasn't really a part of it, but from a live performance perspective she was a big part of the live show, and there were certain parts on the records where the female vocal was the only thing that could be there, so we kind of had to rediscover ourselves, and that record is a part of that experiment". A more straight ahead album than previous releases, Constantino revealed that the band "labored over the structure of this record and the songs that are on it" and that "lyrically, especially, I think we really tried to convey more succinct story lines and character studies while still preserving the ambiguity in the words and the message". He also added that "I think we've always covered a brand range of genres, our influences, but this record was a conscious effort with more cohesion" and that the songs were "little bit lighter and easier to digest".

In late 2013 during downtime from Sleepy Sun, Evan Reiss and Matt Holliman formed Fine Points and released their debut album Hover in July 2015. Constantino works as a cook to supplement his income, and Tice works as a math and physics tutor, teaches Micro Controllers and also consults on prototyping projects.

On January 28, 2014, the band released their fourth album Maui Tears. Prior to recording the album, the band signed to Dine Alone Records who were fans of the band and contacted them with the proposal of working together. The album was recorded with producer Tim Green at his studio in Grass Valley, California. Constantino described the album as being "spacey and very heavy at times, it's very dreamy, and I would hope that it's more transcendent" that the previous album. Towards the end of the sessions, Constantino moved to Texas and now has to commute between there and San Francisco for rehearsals.

In July 2015, the band announced that they had finished recording their fifth album, and the following month revealed they were mixing it. However, in December stated that the album was still a "work in progress" and were still finishing it off in late January 2016. On March 21, 2017, the band published a new publicity shot which confirmed the departure of bassist Jack Allen. They are set to release their fifth studio album Private Tales in June 2017. The album featured both former member Jack Allen and Owen Kelley on bass. Kelley was a member of Fine Points with Reiss and Holliman. The album also saw the band resume work with engineer and producer Colin Stewart, who worked with the band on their first two albums.

== Post Split ==
Frontman Bret Constantino currently works as a chef in California.

Guitarist Evan Reiss has released solo material as Evan Myall.

== Discography ==
=== Albums ===
- Embrace (ATP Recordings, June 16, 2009)
- Fever (ATP Recordings, June 1, 2010)
- Spine Hits (ATP Recordings, April 10, 2012)
- Maui Tears (Dine Alone Records, January 28, 2014)
- Private Tales (Dine Alone Records, June 9, 2017)

=== EPs ===
- Live Sessions (iTunes Exclusive) - EP (Sol Diamond, May 15, 2009)
- Open Eyes EP (ATP Recordings, April 13, 2010)
- Daytrotter Sessions (Daytrotter, August 6, 2012)
- Sleepy Sun (ATP Recordings, October 15, 2013)

=== Singles ===
- White Dove 7" (Sol Diamond, November 2008)
- New Age 10" (ATP Recordings, March 2009)
- Sleepy Son 10" (ATP Recordings, August 2009)
- Open Eyes Digital EP (ATP Recordings, April 2010)
- Marina 10" (ATP Recordings, September 2010)
- Wild Machines Digital Single (ATP Recordings, November 2010)
- V.O.G. Digital Single (Dine Alone Records, April 2012)
- The Lane/11:32 7" (Dine Alone Records, October 2013)
- Seaquest Digital Single (Dine Alone Records, March 2017)
- Crave Digital Single (Dine Alone Records, April 2017)

=== Other appearances ===
- "Where Did the Night Fall" by UNKLE, featured on track "Follow Me Down" (Surrender All, May 10, 2010)
- "What Child is This?" on Psych-Out Christmas (Cleopatra Records, 2013)
