= Poko =

Poko may refer to:

- Poko, Democratic Republic of the Congo, a town
- Poko people of Transvaal, South Africa
- Poko (TV series), a Canadian children's television series
- Poko Mountain, a mountain in Alaska
- Poko Rekords, a Finnish former record label from Tampere, Finland
- Poko noctuid moth, an extinct moth in the family Noctuidae
- André Biyogo Poko (born 1993), Gabonese footballer

== See also ==
- Pom Poko, a 1994 Japanese animated comedy-drama fantasy film directed
- Uo Poko, arcade puzzle game developed by Cave and distributed by Jaleco
- Woody Poco, a 1987 Japan-exclusive video game
- Pocko, an independent press and a creative agency headquartered in London
- Pokou (disambiguation)
