= Elliott Power =

English recording artist and director

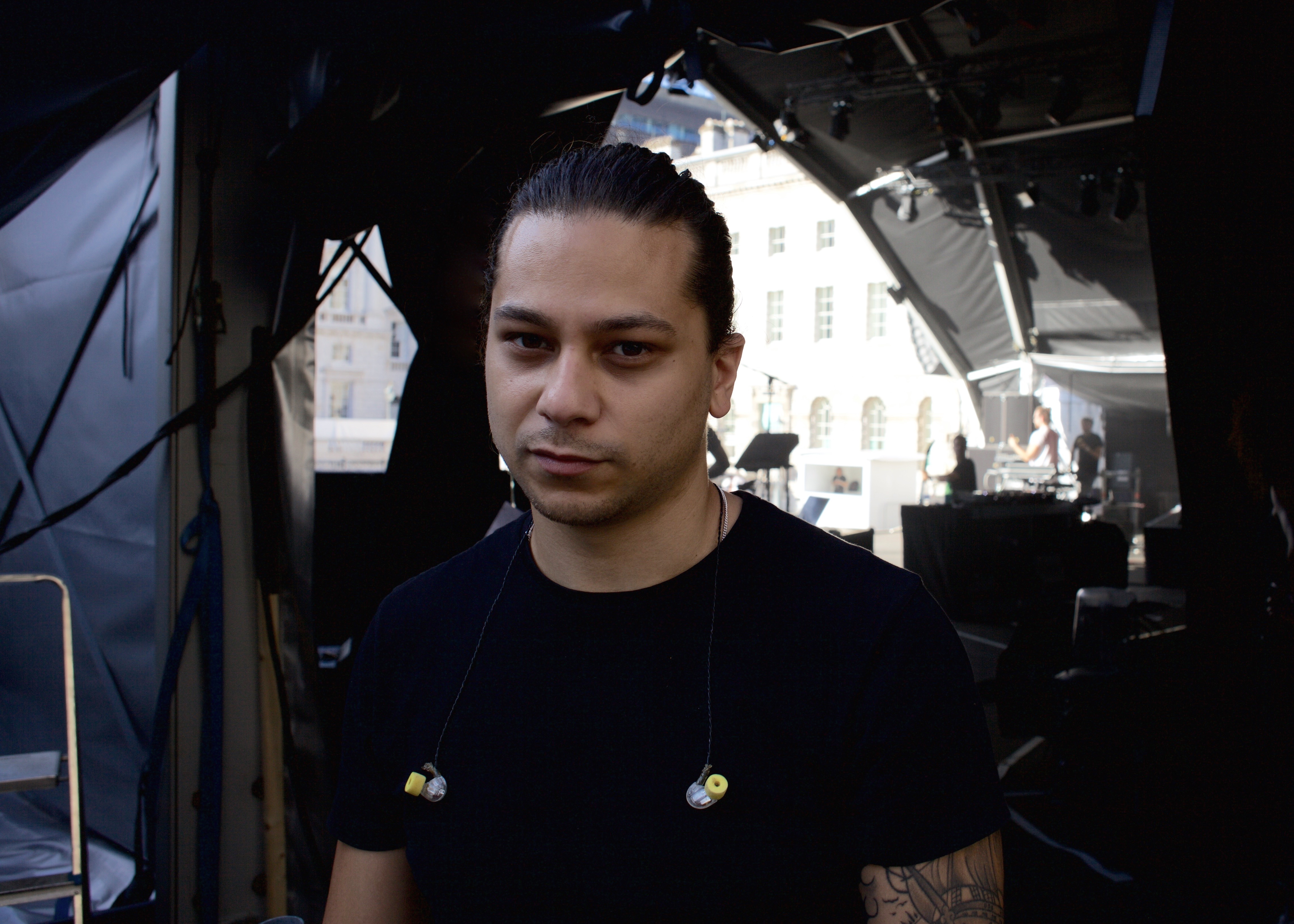
- Elliott Power at Somerset House, 2016

Background information
- Born: Elliott Omar Power-Taiwo; 21 November 1989 (age 36)
- Origin: London
- Genres: Experimental Hip Hop, Electronic, Industrial
- Occupations: Filmmaker, Commercial Director, Musician
- Years active: 2013-Present
- Labels: Marathon Artists (former); Mo'Wax (former)
- Spouse: Clio Peppiatt (m. 2024)
- Website: elliottpower.com

Elliott Omar Power-Taiwo, simply known as Elliott Power (often stylised as ELLIOTT POWER), is an English filmmaker and recording artist born and raised in West London. Power released his debut single, "Sink/Swim", in 2013 on Marathon Artists. His debut album, Once Smitten, was released in 2016 as a Marathon Artists and Mo' Wax collaboration. In 2015, Power's songs "Sword Souls" and "On The Windrush" were remixed by UNKLE and featured on Global Underground #GU41: James Lavelle Presents UNKLE Sounds - Naples compilation. In 2022, Power received a nomination for a Primetime Emmy Award for Outstanding Commercial for Skate Nation Ghana, a film he co-directed alongside Bafic and Justyna Obasi.

== Early life ==
Elliott Power was born in Ealing Hospital in Southall, London, and was raised in Brentford, West London. He attended Little Ealing Primary School, Isleworth & Syon Secondary School and the University of Roehampton. Power's mother is of English and Irish descent, his father of Nigerian and Trinidadian descent.

== Career ==
Power met his production partner Dorian Lutz through a mutual friend when he was 15 years old. Lutz's uncle had a small recording studio just off Askew Road in Shepherd's Bush, West London were the pair began to record music together.

When Power was 21 years old, he began trying to sell his demo to a record label, with little success. Power went onto release his debut single, "Sink/Swim", through Marathon Artists in May 2013. He went onto sign an album deal with Marathon Artists and released his debut album Once Smitten as a collaborative project with James Lavelle's Mo' Wax in February 2016.

In 2020, Power directed a branded content short documentary film for Hennessy following the rise of the chess player Maurice Ashley, the first Black person to attain the title of Grandmaster.

On 12 April 2021 vogue.com premiered Eartheater's music video for their song "Faith Consuming Hope", which Power directed. The video was filmed in Kyiv, Ukraine and depicts Eartheater as a runaway nun breaking free from religious dogmas of her childhood.

Power directed the lead single "Paper Doll" from Miink's second album, Notice Me. Released on 23 June 2022, the music video explores the cultures and ideals of the enslaved blended on the long trans-Atlantic trips, creating new cultural practices, religions, and philosophies. "Paper Doll" specifically looks at the themes of death and rebirth within this wider concept. The video was shot over a period of 12 hours in San Juan Texcalpan, Atlatlahucan, Mexico.

In 2023, Power was part of a cohort of directors and artists tasked with the rebrand of British free-to-air Channel 4 station identifications. Power directed two segments ("Funeral Flowers" and "Unrest") of the 25 identifications. Each is linked to a certain theme: Identity, The Land, System, Release and Love.

In October 2024, Elliott Power was ranked 2nd in the D&AD Directors rankings, an annual recognition of creative excellence in advertising and design. The rankings are based on the accumulation of points from Pencil wins and shortlists across various categories.

Elliott Power was ranked number ten on The List 2025: Top 10 Directors by Campaign magazine.

== Personal life ==
In 2024, Power married British fashion designer Clio Peppiatt in an intimate ceremony in Charente, France. The couple held a celebration at the Institute of Contemporary Arts in London a month later.

== Filmography ==
=== Short Films ===
Year	Title	Director	Writer	Producer	Ref.
2025	K-9INE!	Yes	Yes	Executive	

=== Music Videos ===
Year	Artist	Title	Ref.
2021	Eartheater	"Faith Consuming Hope"	
2022	Miink	"Paper Doll"	
2023	Bloc Party	"So Here We Are"	
2026	Eartheater	"Paradise Rains"	

=== Commercials ===
Year	Company / Brand	Title	Ref.
2020	Hennessy	"Maurice Ashley, The Grandmaster"	
2021	Meta	"Skate Nation Ghana"	
2022	StockX	"Own It"	
2022	Bureau of Travel & Tourism	"Let Travel Do What Travel Does"	
2023	WhatsApp	"Here When You Can't Be There"	
2023	EE	"Freedom"	
2023	Clio Peppiatt	"Bon Appétit"	
2023	Las Vegas	"Excessive Celebration"	
2023	EE	"Broadband Made For Working From Home"	
2024	B&Q	"The Voice"	
2024	New Balance	"Grey Days"	
2024	Lexus	"Rise To It"	
2024	Cadillac	"Go Louder"	
2024	M&S	"Christmas Starts Here"	
2024	JD Sports	"The Family Portrait"	
2024	Beats	"Ordinary Is For Everyone Else"	
2024	Clio Peppiatt	"Break a Leg"	
2025	Puma	"Go Wild"	
2025	Harry's	"Rugged Man of Mystery"	
2025	Nike	"The Dream Is Real"	
2025	Rimowa	"Never Still (Rosé)"	
2025	Nike	"Fly Vini"	
2025	McDonald's	"Side Missions"	
2025	Spotify	"Blasting Mass"	
2025	Sky Bet	"Not For Everyone. For The Fans"	
2025	Irn-Bru	"This is Not a Soft Drink"	
2025	Oakley Meta	"Athletic Intelligence is Here"	
2026	Apple	"Meet iPhone 17e: A Powerful iPhone at a Great Price"	
2026	Graza		
2026	Graza	"Spons"	
2026	Graza	"Testing Twins"	
2026	Graza	"The Harvest"	
2026	Burberry	"A Good Sport"	
2026	Audi	"After Dark"	
2026	Nike		
2026	Nike	"Eats"	
2026	Nike	"Packs"	
2026	Nike	"Complicated"	
2026	Nike	"Hobbies"	
2026	Nike	"Dismantles"	
2026	Apple	"Introducing the new iPad Mini with OLED Display"	
2026	Tesco	"Helping Christmas Feel Magic"	

=== Idents ===
Year	Broadcaster	Title	Notes	Ref.
2023	Channel 4	"Love"	Funeral Flowers ident	
2023	Channel 4	"Release"	Unrest ident	

== Discography ==
Elliott Power discography
- Studio albums: 1
- EPs: 4
- Singles: 22
- Music videos: 11
- Mixtapes: 1

=== Studio Albums ===
Title	Details
Once Smitten	Released: 26 February 2016; Label: Marathon Artists, Mo' Wax; Format: Digital download, LP, CD, Streaming audio

=== Mixtapes ===
Title	Details
The Grimace	Released: 11 November 2022; Label: 'til death do us part; Format: Digital download, Streaming audio

=== Extended Plays ===
Title	Details
Murmur	Released: 24 September 2015; Label: Marathon Artists; Format: Digital download, Streaming audio
Sword Souls (Remixes)	Released: 18 March 2016; Label: Marathon Artists; Format: Digital download, Streaming audio
Kill Fee	Released: 15 March 2019; Label: 'til death do us part; Format: Digital download, Streaming audio
The Grimace (Screwed & Brewed)	Released: 22 December 2022; Label: 'til death do us part; Format: Digital download, Streaming audio

=== Singles ===
Title	Year	Album
"Sink / Swim"	2013	Once Smitten
"On The Windrush"	2014	Once Smitten
"Murmur"	2015	Once Smitten
"Once Smitten"	2016	Once Smitten
"Kill Fee"	2019	Kill Fee
"Inferno"	2019	Kill Fee
"Deep Breaths"	2019	Non-album singles
"Vox Pop"	2019	Non-album singles
"How You Mean?" (featuring LYAM)	2020	Non-album singles
"Me, Myself and Many"	2020	Non-album singles
"Together"	2020	Non-album singles
"Pressure"	2022	The Grimace
"Not For You" (featuring Callum Finn)	2022	The Grimace
"Glaring" (featuring Bawo)	2022	The Grimace
"Guess Again..."	2022	The Grimace
"Behind the Eyes"	2022	The Grimace
"Prophecy"	2022	The Grimace
"Empty Threats"	2022	The Grimace
"The Grimace"	2022	The Grimace
"Precious Metal"	2022	The Grimace
"No Guts No Glory"	2022	The Grimace
"Half Light"	2022	The Grimace

=== As Featured Artist ===
Title	Year	Artist(s)	Album
"Cowboys or Indians" (featuring Elliott Power, Miink and Ysée)	2016	Unkle	The Road: Part I
"Ar.Mour" (featuring Miink, Elliott Power)	2018	Unkle	The Road: Part II (Lost Highway)
"Ar.Mour (Ronin Dub)" (featuring Miink, Elliott Power)	2020	Unkle	Rōnin I

=== Guest Appearances ===
Title	Year	Artist(s)	Album
"You Don't" (featuring Elliott Power)	2016	Formation	Non-album single
"Farewell" (featuring Ysée, Eska, Elliott Power, Keaton Henson, Liela Moss, Miink, Dhani Harrison & Steven Young)	2017	Unkle	The Road: Part I
"Arm's Length" (featuring Elliott Power, Miink and Callum Finn)	2017	Unkle	The Road: Part I
"Iter VI: Prologue" (featuring Elliott Power)	2019	Unkle	The Road: Part II (Lost Highway)
"Nothing To Give" (featuring Miink, Elliott Power)	2019	Unkle	The Road: Part II (Lost Highway)
"Iter IX: Epilogue / Tales of the City" (featuring Elliott Power)	2019	Unkle	The Road: Part II (Lost Highway)
"Farewell (Girls of the Internet Remix)" (featuring Ysée, Eska, Elliott Power, Keaton Henson, Liela Moss, Miink, Dhani Harrison & Steven Young)	2020	Unkle	Girls of the Internet Remix
"Farewell (Amtrac Remix)" (featuring Ysée, Eska, Elliott Power, Keaton Henson, Liela Moss, Miink, Dhani Harrison & Steven Young)	2020	Unkle	Amtrac Remixes
"Farewell (Amtrac Rapid Remix)" (featuring Ysée, Eska, Elliott Power, Keaton Henson, Liela Moss, Miink, Dhani Harrison & Steven Young)	2020	Unkle	Amtrac Remixes
"Farewell (Rōnin / Revisited)" (featuring Ysée, Eska, Elliott Power, Keaton Henson, Liela Moss, Miink, Dhani Harrison & Steven Young)	2022	Unkle	Rōnin II
"Ar.Mour (Rōnin Def Mix)" (featuring Miink, Elliott Power)	2022	Unkle	Rōnin II
"Arm's Length (Rōnin / Club)" (featuring Elliott Power, Miink and Callum Finn)	2022	Unkle	Rōnin II
"Fade to Black" (featuring Elliott Power)	2023	Kloxii Li	Gentle Impermanence

=== Uncredited Appearances ===
Title	Year	Artist(s)	Album
"Iter V - Friend or Foe"	2017	Unkle	The Road: Part I

=== Music Videos as Lead Artist ===
Title	Year	Director(s)	Ref.
"On The Windrush"	2014	Sam Pilling	
"Murmur"	2015	Toby Dye	
"Once Smitten"	2016	Alex Hulsey	
"Kill Fee"	2019	Elliott Power	
"Inferno"	2019	Elliott Power	
"Banshee"	2019	Elliott Power	
"Guillotine Dream"	2019	Elliott Power	
"Deep Breaths"	2019	Elliott Power	
"Vox Pop"	2019	Elliott Power	
"How You Mean?"	2020	Elliott Power	
"Together"	2020	Elliott Power	

=== Music Videos as Featured Artist ===
Title	Year	Director(s)	Ref.
"Cowboys or Indians" (UNKLE featuring Elliott Power, Miink and Ysée)	2017	Warren Du Preez and Nick Thornton Jones	
"Ar.Mour" (UNKLE featuring Elliott Power & Miink)	2019	Dorçia Studio	
"Dot Ashby" (Miink featuring Elliott Power)	2020	N/A	

== Awards and nominations ==
=== AICP Show ===
Year	Nominee / work	Award	Result
2022	Meta "Skate Nation Ghana"		
2022	Meta "Skate Nation Ghana"	Advertising Excellence	Won
2022	Meta "Skate Nation Ghana"	Editorial	Won
2022	Meta "Skate Nation Ghana"	Licensed Soundtrack or Arrangement	Won
2022	Meta "Skate Nation Ghana"	Production	Won
2023	StockX "Own It"	Audio Mix	Nominated

=== British Arrows ===
Year	Nominee / work	Award	Result
2022	Meta "Skate Nation Ghana"	Editing	Bronze
2024	Channel 4 "Idents"		
2024	Channel 4 "Idents"	Best Over 90 Second Commercial	Gold
2024	Channel 4 "Idents"	Achievement in Production	Gold
2024	Channel 4 "Idents"	Writing	Gold
2024	Channel 4 "Idents"	Entertainment & Sports Promotion	Gold
2024	Channel 4 "Idents"	Sound Design	Gold
2024	Channel 4 "Idents"	VFX	Gold
2024	Channel 4 "Idents"	Animation: CGI	Silver
2024	Channel 4 "Idents"	UK Campaign (The John Webster Award)	Silver
2024	EE "Freedom"		
2024	EE "Freedom"	UK Campaign (The John Webster Award)	Gold
2024	EE "Freedom"	Casting	Silver
2024	EE "Freedom"	Best Over 90 Second Commercial	Bronze
2024	EE "Freedom"	Director (The Frank Budgen Award)	Bronze
2025	B&Q "The Voice"	Retailer	Silver
2025	Beats "Ordinary is For Everyone Else"	Fashion & Apparel	Bronze
2025	JD Sports "The Family Portrait"	Fashion & Apparel	Bronze
2026	Puma "Go Wild"	Creative Use of Music	Gold
2026	Irn-Bru "This Is Not A Soft Drink"	Food & Drinks	Bronze

=== Cannes Lions ===
Year	Nominee / work	Award	Result
2022	Meta "Skate Nation Ghana"		
2022	Meta "Skate Nation Ghana"	Editing	Silver
2024	Channel 4 "Idents"		
2024	Channel 4 "Idents"	Achievement in Production	Gold
2024	Channel 4 "Idents"	Sound Design	Silver
2024	Channel 4 "Idents"	Visual Effects	Silver
2024	Channel 4 "Idents"	Direction	Bronze
2024	B&Q "The Voice"	Editing	Shortlisted

=== Ciclope Festival ===
Year	Nominee / work	Award	Result
2021	Meta "Skate Nation Ghana"		
2021	Meta "Skate Nation Ghana"	Color Grading	Grand Prix Winner
2021	Meta "Skate Nation Ghana"	Direction (91 to 180 Seconds)	Finalist
2021	Meta "Skate Nation Ghana"	Cinematography	Finalist
2021	Meta "Skate Nation Ghana"	Editing	Finalist
2023	Channel 4 "Idents"		
2023	Channel 4 "Idents"	Direction (Over 120 Seconds)	Grand Prix Winner
2023	Channel 4 "Idents"	Post Production VFX	Grand Prix Winner
2023	Channel 4 "Idents"	Production Achievement	Gold
2023	Channel 4 "Idents"	Color Grading	Gold
2023	Channel 4 "Idents"	Sound Design	Gold
2023	Channel 4 "Idents"	Film (Over 120 Seconds)	Gold
2023	Channel 4 "Idents"	Direction (Over 120 Seconds)	Silver
2024	New Balance "Grey Days"		
2024	New Balance "Grey Days"	Direction (Over 120 Seconds)	Bronze
2024	New Balance "Grey Days"	Cinematography	Bronze
2024	New Balance "Grey Days"	Fashion & Luxury	Bronze
2024	New Balance "Grey Days"	Sound Design	Finalist
2024	B&Q "The Voice"		
2024	B&Q "The Voice"	Editing	Bronze
2024	EE "Freedom"		
2024	EE "Freedom"	Sound Design	Finalist

=== Clio Awards ===
Year	Nominee / work	Award	Result
2022	Meta "Skate Nation Ghana"		
2022	Meta "Skate Nation Ghana"	Editing	Gold
2022	Meta "Skate Nation Ghana"	Direction	Bronze
2022	Meta "Skate Nation Ghana"	Cinematography	Bronze
2023	Channel 4 "Idents"		
2023	Channel 4 "Idents"	Channel Network Branding	Gold
2023	Channel 4 "Idents"	Channel Network Branding	Silver
2023	Channel 4 "Idents"	Direction	Silver
2023	Channel 4 "Idents"	Voiceover	Silver
2023	Channel 4 "Idents"	Idents Bumpers Interstitials	Bronze

=== Creative Circle ===
Year	Nominee / work	Award	Result
2022	Meta "Skate Nation Ghana"		
2022	Meta "Skate Nation Ghana"	Best Editing	Gold
2024	Channel 4 "Idents"		
2024	Channel 4 "Idents"	Best Broadcast/Terrestrial TV 61secs or over	Gold
2024	Channel 4 "Idents"	Best Channel Idents	Gold
2024	Channel 4 "Idents"	Best Writing for Film	Gold
2024	EE "Freedom"		
2024	EE "Freedom"	Best Broadcast/Terrestrial TV 61secs or over	Gold
2024	EE "Freedom"	Best Direction	Gold
2024	EE "Freedom"	Best Music Video Story/Idea	Gold
2024	EE "Freedom"	Best Cinematography	Silver
2025	JD Sports "The Family Portrait"		
2025	JD Sports "The Family Portrait"	Best Casting	Gold
2025	JD Sports "The Family Portrait"	Best Broadcast/Terrestrial TV 61 Seconds or Over	Silver
2025	JD Sports "The Family Portrait"	Best Cinema 1–2 Minutes	Bronze
2025	JD Sports "The Family Portrait"	Best Use of Existing Music	Bronze
2025	Beats "Ordinary Is For Everyone Else"		
2025	Beats "Ordinary Is For Everyone Else"	Best Broadcast/Terrestrial TV 31secs - 60secs	Silver
2025	Beats "Ordinary Is For Everyone Else"	Best Commercial Colour Grading	Bronze
2025	B&Q "The Voice"		
2025	B&Q "The Voice"	Best Sound Design	Silver
2025	B&Q "The Voice"	Best Writing	Bronze
2025	B&Q "The Voice"	Best Editing	Bronze
2025	B&Q "The Voice"	Best Broadcast/Terrestrial TV 61secs or over	Bronze

=== D&AD Awards ===
Year	Nominee / work	Award	Result
2022	Meta "Skate Nation Ghana"		
2022	Meta "Skate Nation Ghana"	Casting / Street Casting	Yellow Pencil
2022	Meta "Skate Nation Ghana"	Editing	Yellow Pencil
2022	Meta "Skate Nation Ghana"	Direction	Wood Pencil
2022	Meta "Skate Nation Ghana"	Sound Design & Use of Music	Wood Pencil
2022	Meta "Skate Nation Ghana"	Writing for Advertising	Wood Pencil
2024	Channel 4 "Idents"		
2024	Channel 4 "Idents"	Art Direction	Yellow Pencil
2024	Channel 4 "Idents"	Branding	Yellow Pencil
2024	Channel 4 "Idents"	Direction	Yellow Pencil
2024	Channel 4 "Idents"	Commercials Over 120 Seconds	Yellow Pencil
2024	Channel 4 "Idents"	Visual Effects	Yellow Pencil
2024	Channel 4 "Idents"	Sound Design & Use of Music	Yellow Pencil
2024	Channel 4 "Idents"	Animation	Wood Pencil
2024	Channel 4 "Idents"	Colour Grading	Wood Pencil
2024	Channel 4 "Idents"	Writing for Advertising	Wood Pencil
2024	EE "Home, Learn, Work, Game"		
2024	EE "Home, Learn, Work, Game"	Editing	Graphite
2024	Las Vegas "Excessive Celebration"		
2024	Las Vegas "Excessive Celebration"	Casting / Street Casting	Wood Pencil
2025	New Balance "Grey Days"		
2025	New Balance "Grey Days"	Film & Social Commercial Campaigns	Graphite
2026	Irn Bru "This Is Not A Soft Drink"		
2026	Irn Bru "This Is Not A Soft Drink"	Casting / Street Casting	Graphite

=== Primetime Emmy Awards ===
Year	Nominee / work	Award	Result
2022	Meta "Skate Nation Ghana"		
2022	Meta "Skate Nation Ghana"	Primetime Emmy Award for Outstanding Commercial	Nominated

=== Young Director Award ===
Year	Nominee / work	Award	Result
2024	B&Q "The Voice"		
2024	B&Q "The Voice"	Young Director Award (Commercial)	Gold
2024	EE "Freedom"		
2024	EE "Freedom"	Young Director Award (Commercial)	Silver
