= Vivid Live =

Annual contemporary music festival in Sydney, Australia

Vivid LIVE
- Genre: Indie rock, hip-hop, electronic, disco, folk, pop, classical
- Dates: Late May – Early June
- Location: Sydney Opera House
- Years active: 2009–2019, 2021–present
- Attendance: 37,000+
- Website: sydneyoperahouse.com/vivid-live

Vivid LIVE is an annual contemporary music festival held by Sydney Opera House as part of Vivid Sydney. Taking place across all six venues at the Opera House, it features a bill of local and international artists, specially commissioned works and the hallmark Lighting of the Sails. It stands as the centrepiece of the Sydney Opera House's contemporary music program.

At the forefront of each lineup are artists performing live. This has included The Cure’s Reflections (2011); Kraftwerk’s retrospective, The Catalogue 1 2 3 4 5 6 7 8 in 3D (2013); Brian Eno’s Pure Scenius (2009); Lou Reed & Laurie Anderson (2010) and the Pixies (2014).

Unique projects have ranged from the Yeah Yeah Yeahs' Karen O in Stop The Virgens (2012); Sufjan Stevens, Bryce Dessner & Nico Muhly in Planetarium (2012) to Bon Iver’s Justin Vernon, Megafaun and Fight the Big Bull in Sounds of the South (2013).

Vivid LIVE has also seen Australian premieres and exclusive performances from the likes of Ms. Lauryn Hill (2014); Amon Tobin’s ISAM (2012); Chris Cunningham (2011); Bat For Lashes (2011); The Gurrumul Project (2013) and the late Bobby Womack (2013). Most notably, it has showcased a series of emerging artists who have since established themselves at the forefront of contemporary music—including Nils Frahm (2014), St Vincent (2014), Danny Brown (2013), Flume (2009) and Jon Hopkins (2009).

Vivid LIVE was the winner of the Helpmann Award for Best Contemporary Music Festival in 2015.

In 2018 Vivid LIVE celebrated its 10th anniversary.

== History ==
In its inaugural incarnation 26 May - 14 June 2009, Luminous, the festival was curated by Brian Eno whose aim was to produce a truly eclectic lineup: "people who work in the new territories, the places in between, the places out at the edges." Acts included New York city's experimental rock group Battles, trumpet player and composer Jon Hassell, and comedian/musician Reggie Watts.

In 2010, the late Lou Reed and his wife Laurie Anderson realised their artistic vision by performing works of their own, with Reed's Metal Machine Trio and Anderson's Transitory Life.

2011 saw the Sydney-based music promoter and founder of Modular Recordings Steve Pavlovic program the likes of The Cure, video artist Chris Cunningham and psychedelic rock project Tame Impala. The Studio venue was also transformed into a club space for the first time with parties curated by The Avalanches, Mad Racket featuring Gavin Russom’s The Crystal Ark and 2manydjs.

In 2012, Sydney Opera House took the programming of the festival into its own hands, reflecting the rising status of contemporary music at the performing arts centre. Fergus Lineham, the Head of Contemporary Music at the time, said the change was necessary to facilitate the ambitious nature of the festival: "there was such a time commitment and a geographical challenge that it meant we ended up with a lot of people who would have loved to do something but wouldn't do the whole thing." The lineup included Sufjan Stevens, Florence + the Machine and the Ceremonial Orchestra, and the Australian premiere of Shut Up and Play the Hits—a documentary recounting the lead up to LCD Soundsystem's final performance. Karen O also appeared in the Australian debut of her "psycho-opera" Stop the Virgens.

In 2015, Ben Marshall, Head of Contemporary Music at Sydney Opera House, presented his first Vivid LIVE line up — one that he described as "a celebration of unique individuals' voices". In a first for contemporary music at the Opera House, Sydney label Future Classic presented concerts on the Northern Broadwalk.

2020 saw no festival due to the COVID-19 pandemic.

== Artist lineups by year ==
=== 2009 ===
Curated by Brian Eno

- Battles
- Ladytron
- Jon Hopkins
- Reggie Watts
- Jon Hassell
- Lee "Scratch" Perry
- Rachid Taha
- Damien Dempsey & the cosmic Laraaji
- The Necks & Back to Back Theatre

=== 2010 ===
Curated by Laurie Anderson and Lou Reed

- Lou Reed's Metal Machine Trio
- Laurie Anderson's Transitory Life
- Rickie Lee Jones
- Young Jean Lee
- Bardo Pond
- Boris
- King Khan & BBQ Show
- My Brightest Diamond
- Chirgilchin

=== 2011 ===
Curated by Steve Pavlovic

- The Cure
- Spiritualized
- Chris Cunningham
- Yo Gabba Gabba!
- Sonny Rollins
- Bat For Lashes
- Hypnotic Brass Ensemble
- Tame Impala
- Cut Copy
- The Avalanches (DJ Set)
- 2manydjs
- Tom Kuntz
- Architecture in Helsinki
- OFWGKTA
- Wu Lyf
- Azari & III
- The Crystal Ark
- Dom
- Sneaky Sundays
- Superbein
- Mad Racket
- Van She
- Flight Facilities
- Bag Raiders
- Canyons
- Andee Frost
- Horse Meat Disco
- Daniele Baldelli
- Club Kooky
- The Swiss
- Beni
- Softwar
- Bamboo Musik
- Changes

=== 2012 ===
- Sufjan Stevens
- Nico Muhly
- Bryce Dessner
- Karen O and KK Barrett’s Stop the Virgens
- Florence + the Machine
- Janelle Monáe
- The Temper Trap
- Amon Tobin’s ISAM
- Seekae
- My Brightest Diamond
- Danny Brown
- MED
- Tom Vek
- Kindness
- Zola Jesus
- Efterklang with the Sydney Symphony
- Imogen Heap
- Asylum
- Jonathan Boulet
- PVT
- Australian premiere of LCD Soundsystem’s documentary Shut Up and Play the Hits

=== 2013 ===
- Empire of the Sun
- Kraftwerk
- Sounds Of The South (featuring Bon Iver’s Justin Vernon)
- Bobby Womack
- Vangelis - music from Blade Runner
- Bish Bosch Ambisymphonic
- The Gurrumul Project
- Karl Hyde (Underworld)
- Sunnyboys
- Cloud Control
- Live Transmission – Joy Division Reworked
- C.W. Stoneking
- The Sunnyboy (Sunnyboys documentary)
- Matthew E. White

=== 2014 ===
- Pixies
- The Music of Moroder - Heritage Orchestra
- Timeline – Australian Chamber Orchestra featuring The Presets
- Lauryn Hill
- St. Vincent
- James Vincent McMorrow
- Anna Calvi
- Midlake
- Nils Frahm
- Kate Miller-Heidke
- Since I Left You – A Celebration of The Avalanches with Jonti and The Astral Kids
- Penny Penny

=== 2015 ===
- Morrissey
- Sufjan Stevens
- Daniel Johns
- TV On The Radio
- Bill Callahan
- Squarepusher
- The Drones
- The Preatures
- Repressed Records night featuring Royal Headache
- Melbourne Ska Orchestra
- Future Classic 10th anniversary party featuring Flume, Flight Facilities, Seekae, Hayden James, Wave Racer, Touch Sensitive, George Maple & Charles Murdoch
- Red Bull Studio Parties

=== 2016 ===
- Anohni
- Bon Iver
- Deafheaven
- Dress Up Attack
- Esperanza Spalding
- Hiatus Kaiyote
- Max Richter's Sleep
- New Order + ACO
- Oneohtrix Point Never
- Polica
- Ta-ku
- Tiny Ruins
- Wayne Shorter Quartet
- Goodgod Super Club – Ben Fester, Kyle Hall, Magda
- Goodgod Super Club feat. Bradley Zero
- Goodgod Super Club feat. Oneman, Mike Who
- Goodgod Super Club – Asmara, Chanel

=== 2017 ===
- Lighting the Sails: "Audio Creatures" by Ash Bolland, music by Amon Tobin
- Fleet Foxes
- Nick Murphy fka Chet Faker presents Missing Link
- Laura Marling
- AIR
- The Avalanches - Since I Left You Block Party with special guests DJ Shadow, Briggs, Sampa the Great, Jonti + DJ JNETT
- Richie Hawtin CLOSE
- Beth Orton
- Repressed Records 15th Anniversary Feat. Total Control, Severed Heads & More
- Lisa Hannigan
- Bill Callahan
- Sampha
- Nai Palm (Hiatus Kaiyote)
- The Necks
- Camp Cope
- The Preatures (Album Preview)
- The Nixon Tapes, scenes from Nixon in China by John Adams
- Mountain, an ACO collaboration
- Goodgod Super Club presents: DJ Harvey
- Goodgod Super Club presents: Karizma & Ben Fester
- Goodgod Super Club presents: Steffi & Magda Bytnerowicz
- Goodgod Super Club presents: Kenji Takimi with Noise in my Head & Nite Fleit
- Soft Future Piano Bar, presented by Goodgod
- Talk: Nick Murphy in conversation with Lauren Taylor
- Talk: Richie Hawtin in conversation with Ben Marshall, Vivid LIVE Festival Curator

=== 2018 ===
- Solange
- Mazzy Star
- Ice Cube
- Cat Power (Moon Pix 20th Anniversary)
- Dreams (Daniel Johns & Luke Steele)
- H.E.R.
- Iron & Wine
- Neil Finn (Out of Silence with Orchestra)
- Total Control & Friends (featuring Native Cats, Greta Now & DJ Yoni)
- Middle Kids
- No Mono
- Joep Beving
- Fugazi's Instrument (Screening + Q&A with Guy Picciotto)
- Xylouris White
- HTRK
- An Evening with Repressed Records (featuring Nasho, Mick Turner, Nun, Hurtsville & Knitted Abyss)
- Ambient 1: Music for Airports performed by Alaska Orchestra (written by Brian Eno)
- Club Kooky
- Kuren + Electric Fields
- Burial 12"s all night long (with DJ Eli)
- Astral People (featuring Danny Krivit)
- Mad Racket (featuring Lord of the Isles live)
- Lighting of the Sails (Metamathemagical by Jonathan Zawada)

=== 2019 ===
- The Cure (Disintegration 30th Anniversary)
- Maggie Rogers
- Underworld
- Briggs' Bad Apples House Party
- Herbie Hancock
- Sharon Van Etten
- Dirty Three (25th Anniversary of Dirty Three)
- Kelsey Lu
- Jónsi & Alex (Riceboy Sleeps with Orchestra and Choir)
- Club Kooky by the Harbour
- Mad Racket by the Harbour (featuring Larry Heard a.k.a. Mr. Fingers (Live) and Robert Owens)
- Johan Johansson (Last and First Men with the Sydney Symphony Orchestra)
- Grouper
- Spunk Records 20th Anniversary featuring The Middle East and special guests
- Stella Donnelly
- Keaton Henson: Six Lethargies with the Opera Australia Orchestra
- Lonnie Holley
- The Spirit of Churaki
- The Dirty Three Documentary Screening
- Studio Parties: Park Hye Jin, A Guy Called Gerald, and more
- The Hidden Pulse, with M+
- Lighting of the Sails: Andrew Thomas Huang

=== 2022 ===
- Paul Kelly and his band – Time and Tide: Four Decades of Song with Thelma Plum (Australian exclusive)
- Sampa the Great presents An Afro Future with Mwanjѐ & KYE, sounds by C.FRIM
- Nils Frahm: Music for Sydney
- Tkay Maidza with Maina Doe
- Astral People 10 + 1 Birthday with Yussef Dayes, Hiatus Kaiyote, Jay1, Youngn Lipz, Briggs, Mildlife, Barkaa, Arno Faraji, Jitwam Live, Dameeeela, Bumpy, Hoodzy and Munasib
- Masego
- Club Kooky by the Harbour
- Meg Mac
- Hermitude
- Teeks
- Boris 30th Anniversary Show performing Heavy Rocks (2002) with TOKIE
- BLESSED presents AUSSIE BLACKSTAR with appearances by Maina Doe, Baby Prince and more
- RVG
- HTRK
- Liars with The Double (Jim White & Emmett Kelly)
- Low Life
- Miiesha
- Skeleten – Utopian Sound
- Gordi
- In the Mood – A Love Letter to Wong Kar-wai & Hong Kong starring Rainbow Chan, Eugene Choi & Marcus Whale
- KUČKA
- Ed Kuepper with Jim White
- Tiny Ruins
- Tangents & GODTET
- Georgia Maq
- 1300
- Liz Martin & Eliza Hull – Into the Space Between the Notes
- A. Girl
- The Buoys
- Future Classic Studio Party: Touch Sensitive (DJ set), Tseba, Ayebatonye, Deepa
- Picnic Studio Party: Wax’o Paradiso, Kali, Adi Toohey, Evie + Hyfe, hosted by Millie Sykes
- Astral People Studio Party: John Talabot
- Mad Racket Studio Party: Ken Cloud, Simon Caldwell, Jimmi James and Zootie with Edseven & Tom Studdy (Steppers) and vocalist Natalie Slade

=== 2023 ===
- José González – Veneer 20th Anniversary (Australian exclusive)
- Yaeji (Australian exclusive)
- Cat Power Sings Dylan: The 1966 Royal Albert Hall Concert (Australian exclusive)
- Devonté Hynes: Selected Classical Works with the Sydney Symphony Orchestra (Australian exclusive)
- Max Richter: Ambient Orchestra with the Sydney Symphony Orchestra
- Ella Mai
- Thundercat
- Weyes Blood
- Hiatus Kaiyote and the Sydney Symphony Orchestra (Australian exclusive)
- Kimbra
- Budjerah
- Ethel Cain
- Sleaford Mods
- Squarepusher
- Jaguar Jonze: The Art of Broken Pieces (Australian exclusive)
- Alfa Mist with special guests Swooping and Ella Haber
- Posh Isolation Presents: Iceage (Denmark), Low Life, DX
- Posh Isolation Presents: HTRK, Lust for Youth], Croatian Amor (Denmark), YL Hooi
- Jen Cloher
- The Necks
- Martha Marlow: Queen Of The Night
- Becca Hatch
- Birdz & Fred Leone Present: Girra
- Ashli
- Maina Doe
- Pirra
- Pania
- Jacoténe
- Studio Party: Mad Racket – Plaid live A/V set plus Mad Racket DJs Ken Cloud, Simon Caldwell, Jimmi James and Zootie
- Studio Party: Picnic Party
- Studio Party: Future Classic featuring Nikki Nair, Martyn Bootyspoon and Shake Daddy
- Studio Party: House of Mince 12th Birthday

=== 2024 ===
- Arca
- Air perform Moon Safari (Australian exclusive)
- Underworld (Australian exclusive)
- Fever Ray
- Devonté Hynes: Selected Classical Works with the Sydney Symphony Orchestra (Australian exclusive)
- Snoh Aalegra
- Sky Ferreira
- Thelma Plum
- 3NDLES5 presents Yung Lean, jonatan leandoer96 x Frederik Valentin, Ecco2K, oqbqbo & Scandinavian Star
- Spunk Records 25 Finale featuring Explosions in the Sky, Aldous Harding & The Middle East
- Tinariwen
- BARKAA
- Jlin
- Kaiit
- South Summit
- Astral People present Spice Trail featuring Sid Sriram, Priya Ragu, Raf-Saperra with Munasib & Rakish
- Elefant Traks 25th Anniversary – The Finale featuring Hermitude, The Herd, OKENYO, Horrorshow, ANESU, The Last Kinection, Urthboy and more
- Jonti presents The Moonblades
- Tia Gostelow
- Vv Pete
- Bumpy
- xmunashe
- Maple Glider
- Tasman Keith, Flewnt & Inkabee
- Cult ShΦtta
- Zion Garcia

=== Studio Parties ===
- Mad Racket presents Fred P
- Astral People present Mala (DMZ / Digital Mystikz)
- Barney Kato presents Alien featuring Radioactive Man, Mark N, au4r33y & Magda Bytnerowicz
- House of Mince presents Club Mince featuring Hyperaktivist (Mala Junta / MESS) and more
- House of Mince presents Pavolvabar featuring The Illustrious Blacks and more
- dstreet featuring Mad Miran, Piezo, Kate Miller b2b Emelyne

=== 2025 ===
- Beth Gibbons (Australian exclusive)
- Anohni and the Johnsons (Australian exclusive)
- Sigur Rós with the Sydney Symphony Orchestra
- Japanese Breakfast
- Marlon Williams (Australian exclusive)
- Pat Metheny
- Ezra Collective (Australian exclusive)
- The Sabres of Paradise (Australian exclusive)
- WavyLand 7th Anniversary featuring BKTHERULA, Slauson Malone 1, Wiki, Posseshot (Australian exclusive)
- Thaiboy Digital
- Oli XL
- Pale Jay
- Ravyn Lenae
- Mount Kimbie
- Jessica Pratt
- Ichiko Aoba
- Miss Kaninna
- Surprise Chef
- Phoebe Go
- SAHXL
- 3%
- G2G
- Velvet Trip
- Emily Wurramara
- Station Model Violence
- Yasmina Sadiki

=== Studio Parties ===
- Trackwork 5th Birthday featuring Brodinski, Vv Pete, Utility
- Barney Kato presents Sex Tags featuring DJ Sotofett & DJ Fett Burger
- dstreet presents DJ MARIA., Sunju Hargun, Tangela
- House of Mince presents Boris
- DUNJ presents Shackleton (live), Azu Tiwaline (live)
- Mad Racket presents Red Rack’em, Cousin (live set)

=== 2026 ===
- Mitski (Australian exclusive)
- Jeff Mills – Liquid Room Mix 30th Anniversary (Australian exclusive)
- Mogwai – 30th Anniversary
- Matt Berninger (The National)
- King Stingray
- Earl Sweatshirt & MIKE (Presents Surf Gang) Pompeii // Utility
- 3NDLES5 presents SALEM with 3NDLES5 & Jawnino (Australian exclusive)
- Kwn
- Sparks
- Thee Sacred Souls
- 3NDLES5 presents Erika de Casier with the Sydney Symphony Orchestra and Yawning Portal
- Current Joys (Nick Rattigan)
- Cate Le Bon & Cass McCombs
- Alfa Mist
- Rochelle Jordan
- Dry Cleaning with Station Model Violence
- Mark Ernestus Ndagga Rhythm Force
- Khamari
- Party Dozen
- PA777IENCE & Miles Nautu
- ZIPPORAH & Mi-kaisha
- Beddy Rays – Unplugged
- Oren Ambarchi
- Jem Cassar-Daley
- Drifting Clouds
- Derrick Gee’s Radio Hour

=== 15 Years of Astral People Takeover ===
- Gil Scott-Heron by Brian Jackson & Yasiin Bey
- Flying Lotus
- Moonflower Suite: Maina Doe, NMMWL & KHYA with Hey, Love
- Astral People Studio Party (18+) featuring TOKiMONSTA & ONEMAN

=== Studio Parties ===
- DUNJ Studio Party featuring Carrier (live), Yushh (live), gi (live) & Autogenesis (live)
- Barney Kato Studio Party featuring Luca Lozano b2b Mr Ho, Ciara & Barney In The Tunnel
- Fanático x Moral Laxa Studio Party featuring DJ Sprinkles
- Mad Racket Studio Partyfeaturing Kai Alcé, Lovie, Simon Caldwell, Jimmi James & Ken Cloud
