= Ali B (DJ) =

English DJ, radio presenter and producer

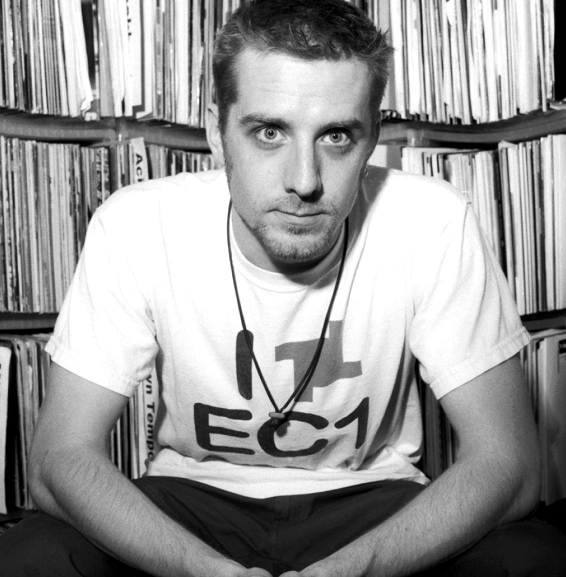
- Ali B in 2013

Background information
- Born: Alistair Bennett; 1975 (age 50–51)
- Origin: London, England
- Genres: Electronica, house
- Occupation: DJ
- Labels: Air Recordings
- Website: airrecordings.co.uk

Alistair Bennett (born 1975), professionally known as Ali B, is an English disc jockey, radio presenter and producer. He is a former resident DJ at Fabric in London and is the owner of Air Recordings. He has released numerous singles and extended plays. He has also worked in radio for over a decade, hosting regular shows for Capital FM, Kiss FM and BBC 6.

== Career ==
Ali B began his career at the age of 18 at the Blue Note Club in London. He then moved on to Fabric where he had a ten-year residency. He was one of the first DJs to play at Fabric and also performed at their pre-opening party. In 2002, Ali B recorded FabricLive.02 as part of the Fabric Live Series. Ali B also worked at Acid Jazz Records before moving on to handle PR for British DJ Norman Jay and Pete Tong of BBC Radio 1.

He has performed at numerous notable events such as the 50th birthday party of Mick Hucknall and the anniversary party for Gary Barlow and his wife. He also performed on the set of Friends during a filming of the show in London as well with Mark Ronson at Abbey Road Studios. He is also one of the early champions of AfrikaBurn as well as regularly appearing at Burning Man.

After collaborating on various art installations at both Burning Man and Afrika Burn, where he has been a regular fixture for the last decade, he was inspired to focus more on creating art. He spent years assisting the renowned pop artist Clive Barker, often tasked with locating source material for his pieces.

His style is very much influenced by Pop Art with bold use of colours, shapes and subject matter echoing the Pop Art giants of the 1960s whilst giving a nod to their contemporaries such as Douglas Coupland and Damien Hirst. His Art Can be seen at Zebra One Gallery in London's Hampstead.

== Discography ==
=== Extended plays ===
- 2006, Ali B Presents Air Breaks, Air Recordings
- 2005, Ali B Presents Y4K, Distinct'ive Records
- 2004, Global Gathering (CD 3), Virgin EMI Records
- 2002, Ali B Fabric Live 02, Fabric Records

=== Singles ===
- 2011, Ali B Vs. Nick Thayer
- 2010, Might As Well (Ali B Remix), Wicked Lester
- 2010, Funk 4 Peace (Ali B's Dusty 45 Remix), Fort Knox Five
- 2005, Ali B Vs. The Jungle Brothers – Beats on a String
- 2004, Breathe Don't Stop (Ali B's Plan B Mix), The Jungle Brothers
- 2003, Why Can't You Free Some Beats (Plan B3), AVH
- 2003, I See Girls (Ali B's Plan B Mix), Studio B
- 2003, My Vision (Ali B's Plan B Mix Vocal), Jakatta
- 2002, Reckless Girl, Beginerz
