= Instrument Serif =

Serif typeface

- Category: Serif
- Classification: Old-style
- Designers: Rodrigo Fuenzalida; Jordan Egstad
- Date released: 2022
- License: SIL Open Font License

Instrument Serif is a free and open source condensed display serif typeface in one weight. Released in 2022, it came to prominence in 2025 when Donald Trump’s Presidential Administration began using it, most notably, as the main typeface on the Whitehouse.gov website.

The press likened Instrument Serif to Apple Garamond, a condensed version of Garamond font used by Apple Computer in the 1980s. British magazine New Statesman described Instrument Serif as a font that looks “a bit like Times New Roman if you compressed it between two walls.”

== Background ==
Instrument Serif is a contemporary interpretation of an old-style serif font design. It was created by designers Rodrigo Fuenzalida and Jordan Egstad for the 2022 rebranding of the design firm Instrument, a branding agency from Portland, Oregon with an office in New York City. Instrument Serif is intended to be used in a large, display size and was designed to contrast Instrument Sans, its low-contrast, variable sans-serif companion font. The designers characterize Instrument Serif as retro-inspired typeface.

== Notable uses ==
President Donald J. Trump in the Oval Office before announcing the executive order directing officials to use the name "Lake America" for Lake Ontario, August 27, 2026. Instrument Serif was used for the "Lake America" label.

The second Trump Administration uses Instrument Serif extensively on its mobile app and website Whitehouse.gov, in event signage, social media posts, and the President's Executive orders, beginning the first week of the Administration in January 2025. The introduction of Instrument Serif to communications by a U.S. President signified a significant shift from humanist sans serif fonts like Calibri used by the presidential Administration of Joe Biden. One of the designers of the font, Jordan Egstad, commented to the press that he disagrees with Trump's policies and finds that use of an open source font to "promote exclusionary policies is deeply ironic".

In 2024, Instrument Serif was used for branding and packaging of David protein bars. Instrument Serif has also been used in packaging design for Vacation Sunscreen, Graza olive oil, Sonagi skincare, and by AI tech startups Perplexity and Hook. As of October 2026, according to Google Fonts, Instrument Serif appears on more than 19,200 websites.

== Specifications ==
Instrument Serif has two styles, Roman and Italic. The 374 latin glyphs that make up this font support 86 languages.

== Distribution ==
Instrument Serif is distributed with the Open Font License and is available for download through Google Fonts and GitHub.
