= Once Smitten =

Studio album by Elliott Power
- Released: 24 February 2016
- Recorded: 2011–15
- Genre: Synthpop, downtempo, trip hop
- Length: 45:00
- Label: Mo' Wax; Marathon Artists
- Producer: Dorian Lutz, Callum Finn

Elliott Power chronology
Murmur (2015)	Once Smitten (2016)	Sword Souls (Remixes) (2016)

Singles from Once Smitten
- 1. "Sink/Swim" Released: 5 July 2013; 2. "On The Windrush" Released: 13 October 2014; 3. "Murmur" Released: 14 September 2015; 4. "Once Smitten" Released: 1 February 2016

Professional ratings
Review scores
Source	Rating
Allmusic	4.5/5 stars

Once Smitten is the debut album by electronic musician Elliott Power. It was released on 24 February 2016 by Marathon Artists in collaboration with Mo' Wax.

== Track listing ==
No.	Title	Writer(s)	Producer(s)	Length
1.	"Murmur"	Elliott Power; Dorian Lutz	Dorian Lutz	4:46
2.	"Once Smitten"	Power	Lutz	5:00
3.	"Sink/Swim"	Power; Lutz	Lutz	3:45
4.	"Built On Greed"	Power	Lutz	4:32
5.	"Unfortunate"	Lutz	Lutz	3:54
6.	"Surveillance"	Power	Lutz	3:53
7.	"Who's Who?"	Power	Lutz	3:44
8.	"Move Dust"	Power	Lutz	3:30
9.	"Blank End"	Power	Callum Finn; Lutz	4:57
10.	"Sword Souls"	Power	Lutz	3:53
11.	"On The Windrush"	Power	Lutz	4:58
Total length:				45:00

== Personnel ==
Credits adapted from Once Smitten album liner notes.

- Anthony Specter – A&R
- James Lavelle – A&R, creative director
- James Macintosh – acoustic guitar
- Angus McLaughlin – acoustic guitar, bass guitar
- Ben Drury – art direction, design
- Warren Du Preez and Nick Thornton Jones – art direction, photography
- Neale Easterby and Richard Ramsey – artist management
- Grace Chatto – cello
- Paul-René Albertini – chief executive office
- Callum Finn – co-producer, vocals
- Elliott Power – creative director, vocals
- Stephanie Haughton – creative project manager
- Johnny Brister – drums, percussion
- Ben Williams – engineer
- Tom Carmichael – engineer
- Jimmy Mikaoui – managing director
- Pru Harris – marketing
- Mike Marsh – mastering
- Dorian Lutz – mixing, producer, programmer, vocals
- Stoppa – percussion
- Charlie Smith – product manager
- Philippe Ascoli – senior A&R
- Helen Fleming – digital content
- Victoria Wood – solicitor
- Joseph Fisher – viola
- Anna Kirkpatrick – violin
- Chalin Barton – vocals
