= Romantic Works =

Studio album by Keaton Henson
- Released: 16 June 2014
- Recorded: 2014
- Genre: Classical, ambient
- Label: Oak Ten

Keaton Henson chronology
Birthdays (2013)	Romantic Works (2014)

Romantic Works is the third studio album by English musician Keaton Henson, released on 16 June 2014. The album features cellist Ren Ford on the majority of songs.

== Music ==
The album is entirely instrumental, and it features cellist Ren Ford on every song except for "Preface", "Petrichor" and "Nearly Curtains". Keaton Henson described the album's music as "bedroom classical", as it was recorded in his bedroom. The album was inspired by Arvo Pärt, Philip Glass, Henryk Górecki, Edward Elgar, Ralph Vaughan Williams and Saint-Saëns.

He said about how the songs are instrumental that "the pieces on it are the in-between moments when I found it all too much to write a clever rhyme." He also said "as someone who writes songs about my own experience, as honestly as I can, I find myself looking for new emotional wells to draw from all the time. But over the years I have found there are certain subjects I have been unable to mine." The second song on the album is "Elevator Song", which he said "wrote while daydreaming and thinking about a breakdown I had in an elevator in Glasgow."

== Release ==
On 16 June 2014 the album was released without any prior announcement or promotion and streamed on The Guardian's website. It was released as a digital download and on CD. A deluxe vinyl edition was later issued via The Vinyl Factory, initially in a run of six limited editions, each of 100 copies. These quickly sold out and were followed by a further run of 1000. Those copies sold out quickly as well and were followed by another printing. A non-album song called "Sand" was also made as a free download not long afterwards through his online store. The first video, for "Earnestly Yours", was released on 4 July 2014, premiering on Clash. On 2 September 2014, he released a video for "Healah Dancing".

== Track listing ==
No.	Title	Length
1.	"Preface"	0:58
2.	"Elevator Song" (featuring Ren Ford)	3:51
3.	"Healah Dancing" (featuring Ren Ford)	4:39
4.	"Field" (featuring Ren Ford)	3:46
5.	"Josella" (featuring Ren Ford)	4:26
6.	"Petrichor"	3:20
7.	"Earnestly Yours" (featuring Ren Ford)	3:40
8.	"Nearly Curtains"	2:42
9.	"Emissary" (featuring Ren Ford)	4:10
Total length:		31:32
