= Birthdays (album) =

Studio album by Keaton Henson
- Released: 25 February 2013
- Recorded: 2012, California
- Genre: Indie folk; slowcore
- Length: 42:15
- Label: Anti–, Oak Ten Records
- Producer: Joe Chiccarelli

Keaton Henson chronology
Dear... (2010)	Birthdays (2013)	Romantic Works (2014)

Singles from Birthdays
- 1. "Sweetheart, What Have You Done to Us" Released: 16 November 2012; 2. "Lying to You" Released: 22 February 2013; 3. "You" Released: 20 April 2013

Professional ratings
Aggregate scores
Source	Rating
Metacritic	73/100
Review scores
Source	Rating
AllMusic	3/5 stars
NME	7/10
PopMatters	8/10

Birthdays is the second studio album from English musician Keaton Henson. It was released in April 2013 under Oak Ten Records.

== Track listing ==
All songs written by Keaton Henson

1. Teach Me - 4:25
2. 10am, Gare du Nord - 3:58
3. You - 4:42
4. Lying to You - 3:47
5. The Best Today - 4:29
6. Don't Swim - 4:56
7. Kronos - 4:10
8. Beekeeper - 4:13
9. Sweetheart, What Have You Done to Us - 3:30
10. In the Morning - 4:01

Deluxe edition tracks

1. Milk Teeth - 3:51
2. If I Don't Have To - 3:36
3. On the News - 3:22

== Charts ==
Chart (2013)	Peak position
UK Albums (OCC)	99

== Personnel ==
- Keaton Henson - Vocals, Guitar

Additional musicians (6, 7)

- Dave Levita - Guitar
- Justin Meldal-Johnsen - Bass
- Zac Rae - Keyboards
- Matt Chamberlain - Drums

Production

- Joe Chiccarelli - producer, mixing
- Chris Sheldon - mixing (7)
- Ben Phillips - mixing (4, 5, 9)
- Geoff Neal, Bill Mims - engineering
- Brian Lucey - mastering

Design personnel

- Keaton Henson - artwork, drawings
- Sophie Harris-Taylor - photography
