= The Road: Part II (Lost Highway) =

Mixtape by Unkle
- Released: 29 March 2019
- Recorded: 2014–2018
- Length: 80:47 (Disc 1: 39:52) (Disc 2: 40:55)
- Label: Songs for the Def
- Producer: James Lavelle

Unkle chronology
The Road: Part I (2017)	The Road: Part II (Lost Highway) (2019)

Singles from The Road: Part II (Lost Highway)
- 1. ""Ar.Mour"" Released: 30 November 2018; 2. ""The Other Side"" Released: 14 December 2018; 3. ""Only You"" Released: 22 February 2019; 4. ""Feel More / With Less"" Released: 3 October 2019

Professional ratings
Aggregate scores
Source	Rating
Metacritic	64/100
Review scores
Source	Rating
Clash	8/10
Exclaim!	9/10

The Road: Part II (Lost Highway) is a mixtape by British electronic music act Unkle, released on 29 March 2019. James Lavelle described it as a mixtape rather than a traditional album, as it consists of songs recorded before and during the sessions for The Road: Part I.

== Track listing ==
=== Disc 1 ===
1. "Iter VI: Prologue" – 0:04
2. "Requiem (When You Talk Love)" (featuring Mark Lanegan) – 4:15
3. "Ar.Mour" (Album Version) (featuring Elliott Power and Miink) – 4:38
4. "Iter VII: Lost" – 0:14
5. "The Other Side" (featuring Tom Smith and Philip Sheppard) – 4:09
6. "Feel More / With Less" – 6:02 (featuring Liela Moss, Miink & Philip Sheppard)
7. "Nothing to Give" – 3:51
8. "Iter VIII: However Vast the Darkness" – 0:22
9. "Long Gone" – 5:50
10. "Only You" (featuring Wil Malone) – 5:12
11. "The First Time Ever I Saw Your Face" (featuring Keaton Henson) – 5:15

=== Disc 2 ===
1. "Iter IX: Epilogue / Tales of the City" – 0:19
2. "Crucifixion / A Prophet" – 7:17
3. "Powder Man" (featuring Chris Goss & Twiggy) – 3:22
4. "Kubrick" (featuring Mick Jones) – 7:33
5. "Sun (The)" – 2:29
6. "Find an Outsider" – 4:54
7. "Iter X: Found" – 0:14
8. "Days And Nights" – 4:34
9. "Reprise" – 3:15
10. "Iter XI: In Your Arms" – 1:06
11. "Touch Me" (featuring Liela Moss) – 5:54 (originally by Rui da Silva)

== Charts ==
Chart performance for The Road: Part II (Lost Highway)
Chart (2019)	Peak position
Belgian Albums (Ultratop Wallonia)	159
UK Albums (Official Charts)	33
