= FabricLive.01 =

Mixtape by James Lavelle
- Released: December 2001
- Genre: House music
- Length: 1:09:32
- Label: Fabric
- Producer: James Lavelle

James Lavelle chronology
Unkle: Psyence Fiction (1998)	FabricLive.01 (2001)	Global Underground 023 (2003)

FabricLive chronology
FabricLive.01 (2001)	FabricLive.02 (2002)

Professional ratings
Review scores
Source	Rating
AllMusic	2.5/5 stars

FabricLive.01 is a DJ mix compilation album by James Lavelle, as part of the FabricLive Mix series.

== Track listing ==
No.	Title	Writer(s)	Length
1.	"Intro: A Message to Our Sponsors"	James Lavelle	0:27
2.	"Get Ready" (Rare Earth)	Smokey Robinson	1:17
3.	"Circles" (The Psychonauts)	The Psychonauts	3:49
4.	"Organ Donor" (DJ Shadow)	DJ Shadow	1:10
5.	"Divine Intervention" (DJ Shadow and Divine Styler)	J. Davis	4:40
6.	"Broken Head II" (South)	Joel Cadbury, Jamie McDonald, Brett Shaw	1:09
7.	"Piku" (The Chemical Brothers)	Tom Rowlands, Ed Simons	1:52
8.	"Hey Jack" (Howie B)	Howie B, Peter Herbert, Will O'Donovan	7:17
9.	"Funny Break (One Is Enough)" (Orbital)	Naomi Bedford, Andy Bramley, Paul Hartnoll	3:24
10.	"Feel It"	James Lavelle	5:06
11.	"Kick a Hole (Tigerstyle)" (Forme)	James Lavelle	3:20
12.	"Night Stalker" (Altitude)	Steve Gibbs	2:29
13.	"Physical 2000" (Peter Dildo)	James Lavelle	1:56
14.	"La La Land" (Green Velvet)	Green Velvet	2:39
15.	"Grab the Rope" (Animated)	Duncan Forbes	2:04
16.	"Mind Set to Cycle" (FC Kahuna)	John Collyer	3:38
17.	"True (The Faggot Is You)" (Morel)	Richard Morel	2:18
18.	"Thru 2 You" (Echomen)	Anton Fielding, Chris Scott	2:32
19.	"Fairytale" (Landmine Spring)	James Lavelle	3:38
20.	"Sacred Cycles" (Peter Lazonby)	Peter Lazonby	3:38
21.	"Release" (Medway)	Sam Mollison, Jesse Skeens	2:54
22.	"Healer" (Bushwacka!)	James Lavelle	3:37
23.	"Everything in Its Right Place" (Radiohead)	Colin Greenwood, Jonny Greenwood, Ed O'Brien, Phil Selway, Thom Yorke	4:38
