= FabricLive.02 =

Mixtape by Ali B
- Released: February 5, 2002
- Genre: Electronica
- Length: 1:13:41
- Label: Fabric
- Producer: Ali B

Ali B chronology
FabricLive.02 (2002)	Y4K (2005)

FabricLive chronology
FabricLive.01 (2001)	FabricLive.02 (2002)	FabricLive.03 (2002)

FabricLive.02 is a DJ mix compilation album by Ali B, as part of the FabricLive Mix Series.

== Track listing ==
No.	Title	Length
1.	"Intro"	0:21
2.	"Underground Funk" (featuring DJ Love)	3:29
3.	"Worldwide" (featuring Red Tape)	3:14
4.	"Get Down" (featuring Shakedown)	4:26
5.	"Number 2" (featuring Bassbin Twins)	3:14
6.	"Body Rock" (featuring Mike & Charlie)	2:49
7.	"My Definition" (featuring DJ Technique)	2:39
8.	"Let Me See If You Can Dance"	1:26
9.	"Groove Operator" (featuring DJ Spice)	2:24
10.	"Sky Juice" (featuring Lee Coombs)	3:47
11.	"Criminals"	2:06
12.	"Believing in It" (featuring Dreadzone)	3:48
13.	"Feel the Funk" (featuring Tony Faline)	4:54
14.	"God Can't Stop"	4:12
15.	"Surreal" (featuring DJ Icey)	4:10
16.	"Gyromancer" (featuring PMT)	3:38
17.	"Feel the Bass"	1:58
18.	"Big Groovy Fucker"	5:21
19.	"Esw" (featuring Bassbin Twins)	2:33
20.	"Hold On"	2:33
21.	"Next Level"	5:14
22.	"Night Time"	5:25
