= The Man from Mo'Wax =

The Man From Mo'Wax
- Theatrical release poster
- Directed by: Matthew Jones
- Produced by: M.J. McMahon; Matthew Jones; Brian A. Hoffman
- Starring: James Lavelle; DJ Shadow; Richard File; Pablo Clements; Joshua Homme; Robert Del Naja; Ian Brown; Futura; Thom Yorke; Grandmaster Flash
- Cinematography: Miguel Medina
- Edited by: Alec Rossiter
- Production company: Capture
- Distributed by: BFI; Trafalgar
- Release dates: 15 March 2016 (SXSW); 30 August 2018 (United Kingdom)
- Running time: 116 minutes
- Country: United Kingdom
- Language: English
- Box office: $25,502

The Man From Mo'Wax is a 2016 documentary film about DJ and record label boss James Lavelle.

Directed by Matthew Jones, and produced by M.J. McMahon, Matthew Jones and Brian A. Hoffman. The Man From Mo'Wax had its European premiere as part of the 2016 BFI London Film Festival on 14 October 2016 and was given a cinema release in the United Kingdom on 30 October 2018.

== Overview ==
The film follows Lavelle's life from childhood, documenting his rapid rise to fame following the founding of his record label Mo' Wax. The film focuses on various pivotal moments in Lavelle's career, starting with his days writing for Straight No Chaser, and putting on club nights in London. Lavelle's shift from A&R man to musical artist as part of UNKLE becomes the central theme, with his fractious relationship with DJ Shadow unfolding throughout.

=== Development ===
The film was initially produced under the working title The Man From UNKLE, and later Artist & Repertoire. The film makes extensive use of private archive footage provided by both Lavelle and Shadow. Over 700 hours of footage were unearthed by the filmmakers.

== Reception ==
As of 3 January 2019, The Man From Mo'Wax with a limited release, had grossed $25,502.

On review aggregator Rotten Tomatoes, the film holds an approval rating of 77% based on 13 reviews. Time Out film critic Philip De Semlyen described it as “A warts-and-all tales of hubris and heavyweight beats”.

== Charts ==
Chart (2018)	Peak position
UK Official Music Video Chart (OCC)	1
