= The Road: Part 1 =

The Road: Part I

Studio album by UNKLE
- Released: 18 August 2017
- Length: 59:34
- Label: Songs For The Def
- Producer: James Lavelle

UNKLE chronology
Where Did the Night Fall (2010)	The Road: Part I (2017)	The Road: Part II (Lost Highway) (2019)

Singles from The Road: Part I
- 1. "Cowboys or Indians" Released: 15 July 2016; 2. "Sick Lullaby" Released: 25 January 2017; 3. "Looking for the Rain" Released: March 2017; 4. "The Road" Released: April 2017; 5. "Sunrise (Always Comes Around)" Released: 7 July 2017

Professional ratings
Aggregate scores
Source	Rating
Metacritic	71/100
Review scores
Source	Rating
AllMusic	3.5/5 stars
The Guardian	3/5 stars
The Irish Times	4/5 stars
The Line of Best Fit	8/10
Magnet	9/10
Mixmag	7/10
PopMatters	8/10
Q	3/5 stars
Record Collector	3/5 stars
Slant Magazine	4/5 stars

The Road: Part I is the fifth studio album from British electronic music act Unkle, released on 18 August 2017.

== Background ==
The Road: Part 1 is the first UNKLE record in seven years. The album was inspired by James Lavelle's time spent curating the Meltdown Festival at London's Southbank Centre in 2014. Talking about the process of creating the new album, Lavelle said:

I hadn't made a record in a long time, and the incarnation of UNKLE had changed in that now, it was me on my own. For that reason, I wanted to make a record that I hadn't been able to before, going back to the roots of where I came from, with a foot in modern London.

== Artwork ==
The artwork for the album was created by German painter Jonas Burgert. The album is accompanied by a 36-page booklet that features artworks by Nathan Coley, John Isaacs, David Nicholson, Norbert Schoerner, Doug Foster, and previous collaborators Warren Du Preez and Nick Thornton Jones.

== Track listing ==
No.	Title	Length
1.	"Iter I: Have You Looked at Yourself"	0:49
2.	"Farewell" (featuring Ysée, Eska, Elliott Power, Keaton Henson, Liela Moss, Mink, Dhani Harrison and Steven Young)	6:16
3.	"Looking for the Rain" (featuring Mark Lanegan, Eska and Twiggy Ramirez)	6:01
4.	"Cowboys or Indians" (featuring Elliott Power, Mink and Ysée)	6:20
5.	"Iter II: How Do You Feel"	1:06
6.	"Nowhere to Run/Bandits" (featuring Twiggy Ramirez)	5:34
7.	"Iter III: Keep on Runnin'"	0:56
8.	"Stole Enough" (featuring Mink)	3:09
9.	"Arm's Length" (featuring Elliott Power, Mink and Callum Finn)	4:56
10.	"Iter IV: We Are Stardust"	0:59
11.	"Sonata" (featuring Keaton Henson)	5:18
12.	"The Road" (featuring Eska)	6:22
13.	"Iter V: Friend or Foe"	0:33
14.	"Sunrise (Always Come Around)" (featuring Liela Moss)	6:42
15.	"Sick Lullaby" (featuring Keaton Henson)	4:33
16.	"Looking for the Rain" ((Trentemøller Rework)" [Japanese bonus track])	4:57

== Charts ==
Chart (2017)	Peak position
Belgian Albums (Ultratop Flanders)	106
Belgian Albums (Ultratop Wallonia)	80
German Albums (Offizielle Top 100)	92
Irish Albums (IRMA)	58
New Zealand Heatseekers Albums (RMNZ)	8
Scottish Albums (OCC)	12
Swiss Albums (Schweizer Hitparade)	55
UK Albums (OCC)	16
