= Toby Dye =

English filmmaker

Toby Dye is an English filmmaker based in London.He started his career as a documentary filmmaker and was awarded the prestigious Grierson Award in 2010 for his documentary film “Bodysnatchers of New York”. Along with this, other notable work includes music videos for Massive Attack and UNKLE, ‘Phobos’ for Ridley Scott and starring Michael Fassbender and Katherine Waterson, his internationally exhibited film/art installation ‘The Corridor’ and commercials for brands such as Heineken, Ford and American Express

== Early life ==
Dye grew up in the rural Peak District of Derbyshire, England. From age 16 he worked as a projectionist at his local art house cinema, which fuelled a passion in film. His career began in documentaries, principally working for the UK's Channel 4, on the TV series ‘True Stories’ and ‘Cutting Edge’, before he branched out into music videos and commercials after signing with Ridley Scott's production company, RSA Films.

== Filmography ==
Film
Year	Title	Produced by
2010	Bodysnatchers of New York	'True Stories' Channel 4
2011	Epic	RSA
2017	Alien: Covenent 'Phobos'	20th Century Fox

Music Videos
Year	Title	Artist
2010	Paradise Circus	Massive Attack
2012	Another Night Out	Unkle Feat Mark Lanagan
2015	Murmur	Elliott Power

Commercials
Year	Title	Brand
2016	Free The Kids	Persil
2016	One Breath	Nicorette
2017	Worlds Apart	Heineken
2018	13 Reasons Why	Netflix
2018	100 Dark Days	Ford Ranger 'Black Edition'
2018	We Are The NHS	NHS
