= Pocko =

British creative agency

Pocko is an independent press and a creative agency headquartered in London, with offices in Los Angeles, and Milan. Pocko has three main fields of operation: publishing – under their publishing arm, Pocko Editions; a communication and creative consultancy, Pocko Lab; and a talent agency, Pocko People – representing illustrators, graphic designers, animators and photographers.

== History ==
Pocko was founded in 1999 by Royal College of Arts photography graduate, Nicola Schwartz. Pocko's first initiative was the Pocko Collection in collaboration with Diesel in 2002, a series of pocket size books composed by different artists. The mini books with ten titles showcased talented illustrators and photographers, with a few designed as pull out postcards. The books were retailed in Selfridges, and were the first selection of widely distributed art to combine publishing with brand communication.

== Communications and creative work ==
Pocko Labs' former clients have included a variety of international companies from Disney, MTV, Paramount Comedy 1, the New York Times, Chronicle Books, BMW Oracle Racing, to Eni and IBM. Major clients in the design, fashion, and retail industry include household names such as Iittala, Gas Jeans, Comme des Garcons, Marc Jacobs, Cacharel, Alexander McQueen, Diesel, Selfridges, L'Oréal, and Top Shop. Pocko has also created work for charities such as National Society for the Prevention of Cruelty to Children and the Bambino Gesù Hospital, a noted children's hospital in Rome.

Recent notable projects include an animation film made in collaboration with illustrator Klaus Haapaniemi for Finnish design company Iittala's new ceramic tableware collection "Tanssi" (meaning "dance" in Finnish). The Tanssi animation and ceramic range was created in conjunction with a new production at the Finnish National Opera of Czech composer Leoš Janáček's The Cunning Little Vixen, for which Klaus Haapaniemi also designed the set design and costumes. The main inspiration for the animation came from Haapaniemi's work for the opera production: "Klaus had done stage design before and so we started looking at shadow puppets. We liked this resolutely 2D look... because it would stand out from all the high tech 3D animation out there. From there we hit upon a combination of Eastern shadow puppets and Victorian magic lantern shows, along with the richness of Baroque patterns, textures and character exuberance that appears in the Tanssi range".

== Publishing ==
Pocko's publishing work is developed under the title Pocko Editions, and focuses on publishing illustrative and image-oriented books relating to contemporary popular culture and art. Pocko Editions' publishing credits include Keaton Henson's wordless graphic novel "Gloaming", Stacy Hardy's short story collection "Because the Night", and recording artist MIA's collection of innovative personal paintings titled "M.I.A.: No. 10".

=== Pocko Collection ===
Pocko Collection is a series of pocketable books that 'merge art and design within the fuzzy borders of contemporary culture'. The collection currently contains 18 books split across three series: 1 (2001), 2 (2002), 3 (2003). "The series feature a wide range of talent from Japan, Spain, Italy, Israel, USA and Scotland ... upcoming releases will draw work from Finland, Sri Lanka, South Africa and Ukraine", with contributing authors Adam Lowe, Klaus Haapaniemi, Maya MIA Arulpragasam, Paul McDevitt, Hiro Sugiyama, Ori Gersht, and Tracey Ferguson. According to an interview in Frieze Magazine (March 2003) Pocko Editions' goal was "to publish 96 books over the next ten years, regardless of the indications of their accountants' spreadsheets". Pocko Collection was partly funded by the clothing company Diesel.

=== Keaton Henson – Gloaming ===
In 2012 Pocko Published English graphic illustrator and blues musician Keaton Henson's visual journey Gloaming. The graphic novel's inspiration is born from old Scandinavian folklore and Japanese Kwaidan (ghost stories) from the Edo period. The author describes Gloaming as "a study of the things we cannot see. It is an ode to the suburbs and the creatures that come to life within its mundanity."

Coinciding with the release of his graphic novel, Pocko produced an exhibition/performance of the same name at London's Blackall Studios. The exhibition featured a range of original drawings from Keaton, and centred around a unique and intimate one-on-one live performance from Keaton, who struggles with playing live in a conventional sense. Guardian writer Robbie Wojciechowski described the "magical" exhibition as "The deep guilt you feel inside you wants Keaton to share his soul with you, and he does, happily, sitting upon a stool staring out at you. You sit, you wait, he plays, and your hearts broken – all in less than five minutes. You spend your time, post performance, realising that you’ll never get to see an experience that parallels this".

=== Stacy Hardy – Because the Night ===
In 2015 Pocko published South African journalist, writer, and multimedia artist Stacy Hardy's Because the Night "part book, part art object" it consists of a collection of short stories with photography by Mario Pischedda. In an interview with the South African Journalist Hardy describes the project as "dealing with themes around the body, sexuality, gender and politics and trying to navigate that in the confused, weird space that is South Africa. It sits in the space between confessional literature and experimental interface". She emphasises the importance of the collaboration with Mario Pischedda photographs as "colliding against mine and in that conclusion evoke new meanings. There is wonderful play between his masculinity and my femininity that makes for friction and cohesion, conflict and beauty… it's a bit like a love affair on the book's pages".

The book received critical acclaim and was widely featured in South African press, hailed as "Risky, brave and beautiful, this collection sets a new standard for the South African short story" that "challenges the fetishization and objectification of the female body". The Mail & Guardian argued that Because the Night "must be celebrated for stretching the boundaries of "acceptable" female experience in literature. It offers an empowering, escapist journey for women, especially relevant to a South African readership, where perceived danger lurking in dark public spaces severely curtails women's mobility and expression".

The book has also received strong reviews in the international press with noted American author Noy Holland praising the collection saying: “One can read a long way into the literature of any continent and find little which speaks so powerfully and with such candor about the life of body, the quickness of the mind to depart, as Because the Night.”

=== Other published works ===
- Klaus Haapaniemi – Giants (2004)
- Yuko Kono – Too Fat, Can't Fly and other stories (2004)
- Daisy de Villeneuve – He Said, She Said the Journal (2005)
- Daisy de Villeneuve – I Told You So (2005)
- Fukiko Yamamoto – Kika My First Word Book (2006)
- Tamed & Pocko – Blade (2007)
- Bartolomeo Pietromarchi – Nuclear Voyage (2007)
- Federico Brugia – FIFTY-ONE (2008)
- Pocko Times Magazine Vol. 1: Metropolis (2009)
- Pocko Times Magazine Vol. 2: Big is Small (2010)
- Pocko Times Magazine Vol. 3: Light Works (2011)

== Exhibitions ==
Pocko Gallery is "a curatorial entity which develops exhibition projects based around themes inspired by contemporary culture", displaying a variety of work from illustration, photography, and graphic artists. The Pocko Gallery started out in Milan, Italy in 2008, until its relocation to the Dalston area of London, UK in early 2015. In addition, Pocko has held several exhibitions at a variety of venues including the Rocket Gallery in Tokyo; the Magma bookshops in London; the Kemistry Gallery, London; Blackall Studios, London; as well as through collaborations at the Sanderson Hotel and at Selfridges store on Oxford Street.

=== Museum of Small Things ===
From 5 February to 7 March 2009, Pocko exhibited "M.O.S.T." a collaborated venture with Selfridges and designer Kit Grover, to celebrate the beauty of 'the small'. Exhibits ranged from objects, images, moving pictures, ideas, detritus and treasures. The "oversized cabinet of curiosities", featured work from over 20 Pocko artists alongside the work of noted British artists and designers, such as Grayson Perry; jewellery designer Shaun Leane; Bob and Roberta Smith, and Richard Wentworth. According to Selfridges the exhibition consisted of "modest masterpieces, under-valued in cultures where biggest is better and mega is best".

=== Pockoshko ===
In 2009, Pocko collaborated with Magma to create a project involving 20 international, award-winning artists, including illustration artists Nomoco (Kazuko Nomoto), Paul Bower, Hennie Haworth, Dr Alderete (Jorge Alderete), and Ben Newman. The artists customised a series of wooden Matryoshka dolls using a variety of techniques, from oil painting, ink and watercolour to collage and soldering.

=== Kyoko Hamada – I Used To Be You ===
The first exhibition held in Pocko's new Dalston gallery space in spring 2015, the "I Used To Be You" Kickstarter project and exhibition in spring 2015 showcased the work of New York-based photographer Kyoko Hamada. Since 2012, Kyoko Hamada has been photographing herself as the fictional character "Kikuchiyo-san", an elderly woman. This "amazing transformation" resulted in a collection of 99 photographs which often use humour, metaphors and storytelling to represent the process of living and ageing. “I Used To Be You” series received the Grand Prize in the Portfolio category from the LensCulture International Exposure Awards and was also included in The Photolucida Critical Mass Top 50.

=== Jules Julien & Labo.Art – Encounters ===
Encounters represented the latest work of Amsterdam-based French illustrator Jules Julien and Milanese fashion design initiative Labo.Art. The exhibition was first presented at Milan Design Week, before moving to the Pocko Gallery in London. Jules Julien's "poignant universe" is built through the use of digital painting tools and a dedication to accuracy and photographic realism: " Julien is a child of the technology generation, his work deeply rooted in its time". "Julien’s conceptual and vivid imagination" is balanced out by "wearable architecture" of Labo.Arts fashion designer Ludovica Diligu's "the sober and minimal elegance".

=== Previous exhibitions ===
- 2002 "Pocko", Magma, London,
- 2002 "Pocko", Rocket Gallery, Tokyo,
- 2004 "Pocko Exhibition", Magma, London
- 2008 "Let's Make Out", Pocko Gallery, Milan
- 2008 "Federico de Leonardis: Quasi niente”, Pocko Gallery, Milan
- 2009 “No understanding between the brain and the hands”, Kemistry Gallery, London
- 2009 “Petrolio I”, Pocko Gallery, Milan
- 2009 “Metropolis”, Pocko Gallery, Milan
- 2011 “Paul Bower: Come and get it”, Sanderson Hotel, London
- 2012 "Keaton Henson: Gloaming", Blackall Studios, London
