= Pokou =

Pokou is a surname and may refer to:

- Laurent Pokou (1947-2016), Ivorian footballer
- Queen Pokou (c. 1730–1750), Queen and founder of the Baoule tribe
