= Poko people =

People of Transvaal, South Africa

The Poko are a people of Transvaal, South Africa. They were conquered in 1865 by the Boer settlers and Mswati II.
