= Poko Mountain =

Mountain in Alaska, United States

Coordinates: 68°48′30″N 162°23′04″W

Poko Mountain (elevation: 3,146 feet (959 m)) is a summit in North Slope Borough, Alaska, in the United States.

Poko is likely derived from an Eskimo word meaning "seal parka".
