= AfrikaBurn =

Burning Man regional event in South Africa

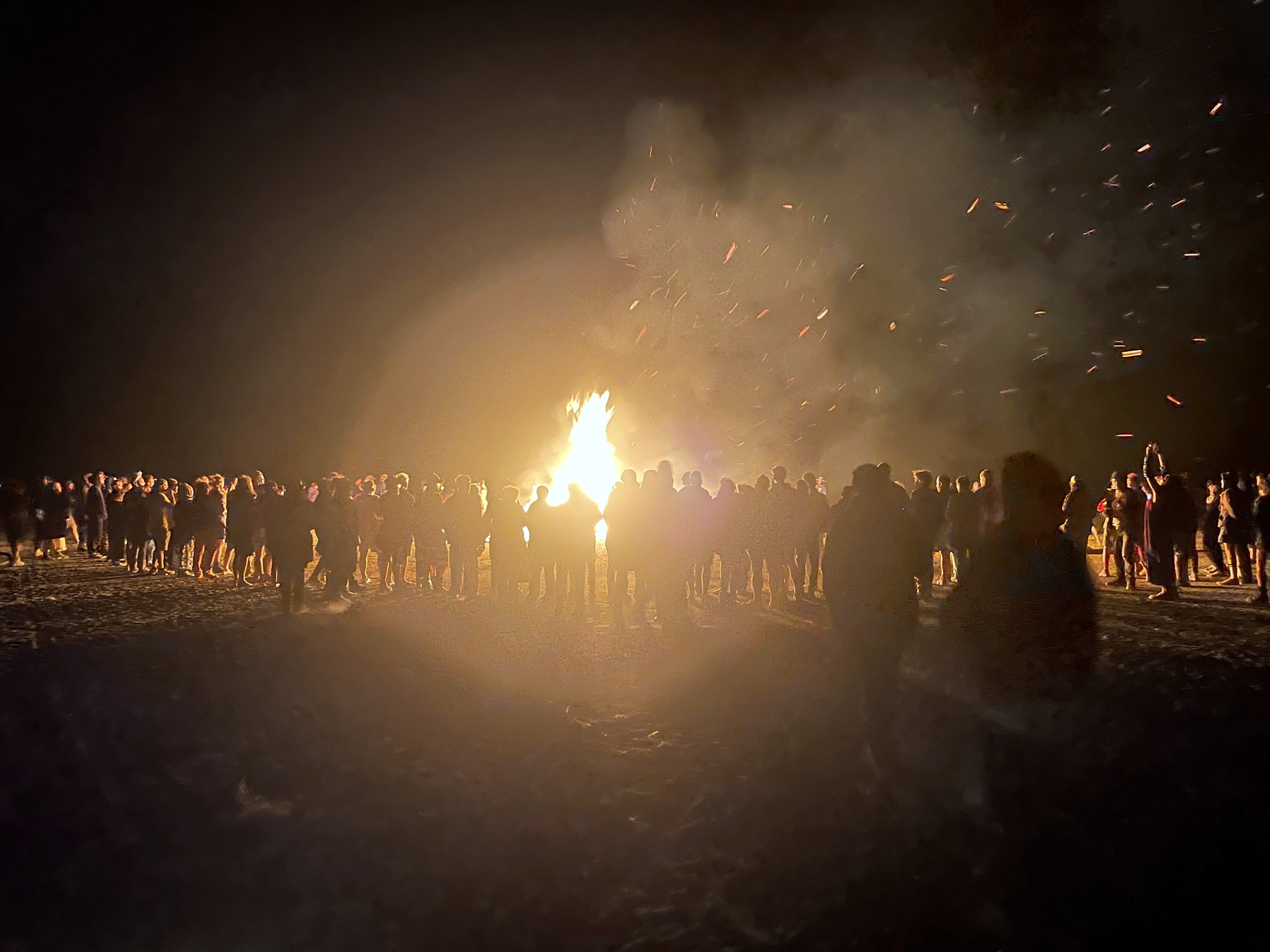
- A Burn at AfrikaBurn
- Dates: April / May
- Frequency: Annually
- Location: Tankwa Karoo
- Country: South Africa
- Inaugurated: 2007
- Founders: Paul Jorgensen, Robert Weinek, Liane Visser, Mike 't Sas-Rolfes, Richard Bowsher, Monique Schiess.
- Attendance: ~11,000
- Website: www.afrikaburn.org

AfrikaBurn is an official Burning Man regional event, held at Quaggafontein (lit. "fountain of Quagga") in the Tankwa Karoo, in the Western Cape Province of South Africa. It is centered on the building of a temporary creative community in a semi-desert environment, involving ephemeral artworks, some of which are burnt towards the end of the event. Many attendees wear elaborate costumes and some create decorated "mutant vehicles". These mobile art cars are officially called Desert Mutant Vehicles.

== History ==
Africa Burns Creative Projects (AfrikaBurn) was established in 2007 as a not-for-profit company, with the intention that it would serve as a vehicle for the creation and co-ordination of an independent South African Burning Man regional event. AfrikaBurn was originally conceived by Paul Jorgensen.

Paul Jorgensen had attended several Burning Man events and become good friends with Larry Harvey and the Burner family, he had come out to South Africa to see his parents and with the intention of creating an artistic platform to unite and bring together South Africans on a playground without politic. His friend from school Robert Weinek (Miss Nesbitt) was the choice for collaborator. With his art and gallery background and experience as a cultural agitator, he was the perfect foil to marry Paul's energy with the "mandate" from Larry to get things “burning here” in Africa. Robert Weinek reached out to Liane Visser, realising that her knowledge of the local art scene and experience as an outdoor promoter and party designer would be the perfect catalyst. Over a dinner at Malplaas, the initial plan was hatched between the three cultural alchemists. Many of the early concepts like the "Binnekring" and "Buitekring" and the inclusion of Afrikaans as the "official" lexicon were conceived of that night. It took nearly two years of behind the scenes knitting and weaving by these three, before the first event took place.

A special mention should also be made for the energy, input and inspiration of Charlie Blackcat Smith, Paul Grose, John Allesandri, Harry Logos, Simon Dunckley and Jutta Holzapfel who helped coddle the little spark into the flame that it has become.

The company's founding members were Paul Jorgensen, Robert Weinek and Liane Visser, Mike 't Sas-Rolfes (a special mention should be made of Michael's mom whose energy and support helped create the first mini-burn at Roberts house in Somerset West) along with Richard Bowsher and Monique Schiess.

The event has been running since 2007, with all events up to 2019 held on a private farm called Stonehenge, which is adjacent to the Tankwa Karoo National Park. Late in 2019, two adjacent properties - Quaggafontein and Vaalfontein were gifted to AfrikaBurn by the Mapula Trust. Quaggafontein (as both farms are now collectively known) is located 30 km southeast of Stonehenge Private Reserve as the crow flies, below Skoorsteenberg mountain.

Much like the old event site, Quaggafontein is very isolated, and the property is within the Western Cape provincial boundary and features one portion characterised by a high degree of biodiversity and vulnerable flora and fauna species (which will be off-limits in order to preserve these species) and another that is characterised by degradation (which would be appropriate for the event site).

The event was originally called Afrika Burns, however owing to concerns about the name having possible negative connotations the name was changed through community consultation to AfrikaBurn, from something that happens ('burns') to Africa, to something that happens (a 'burn') in Africa.

In 2010 the dates of the annual event were moved to earlier in the year, as autumn weather is better suited to the event, and it is currently possible for a public holiday (or in some years two public holidays) to be included within the week during which the event runs. It also means that it is not so close to Burning Man, to allow for more international participants.

Each event mobilises around a theme, which is intended as a point of possible connection, or inspiration. The theme is not imposed on artworks, projects or gifts.

Year	Dates	Location	Theme	Participants	San Clan
2007	22–25 November	Stonehenge farm	Tribe	~1,000	
2008	16–19 October	Stonehenge farm	Power	~1,200	
2009	9–13 September	Stonehenge farm	Time	~1,600	
2010	22–27 April	Stonehenge farm	Dream	~2,200	
2011	27 April - 2 May	Stonehenge farm	Stof: the Primal Mud	~4,000	
2012	25–30 April	Stonehenge farm	Mirage	~5,700	
2013	1–6 May	Stonehenge farm	Archetypes	~7,000	
2014	28 April - 4 May	Stonehenge farm	The Trickster	~9,000	
2015	27 April - 3 May	Stonehenge farm	The Gift	~9,800	
2016	25 April - 1 May	Stonehenge farm	X	~11,700	
2017	24–30 April	Stonehenge farm	Play	~13,000	
2018	23–29 April	Stonehenge farm	Working Title______________	~11,000	
2019	29 April – 5 May	Stonehenge farm	Ephemeropolis	~11,500	
2020 (Note: Cancelled due to the COVID-19 pandemic)	27 April – 3 May	Stonehenge farm	Afroboratory	Cancelled	Cancelled
2021		Quaggafontein		No event	No event due to lockdown
2022	25 April - 1 May	Quaggafontein	The Elastic Kraal-Art Burning Test	~6,500	AfrikaBurn Clan 2022 - Clancestors
2023	24–30 April	Quaggafontein	SPACE	~9500	
2024	30 April - 5 May	Quaggafontein	CREATION	~10500	AfrikaBurn Temple 2024 - LuminEssence
2025	28 April - 4 May	Quaggafontein	Out Of The Blue	10728	
2026	27 April - 3 May	Quaggafontein	Through The Prism		
2027	26 April - 2 May	Quaggafontein	The Big Question		

The current executive director of the organisation is Lorraine Tanner. The executive director of Operations is Dane Marrison. The non executive directors are: Samantha Bendzulla, Jan Bester, Sydney Mathebula, Coenraad Middel, Nic Raubenheimer, Michael 't Sas-Rolfes.

== San Clan ==
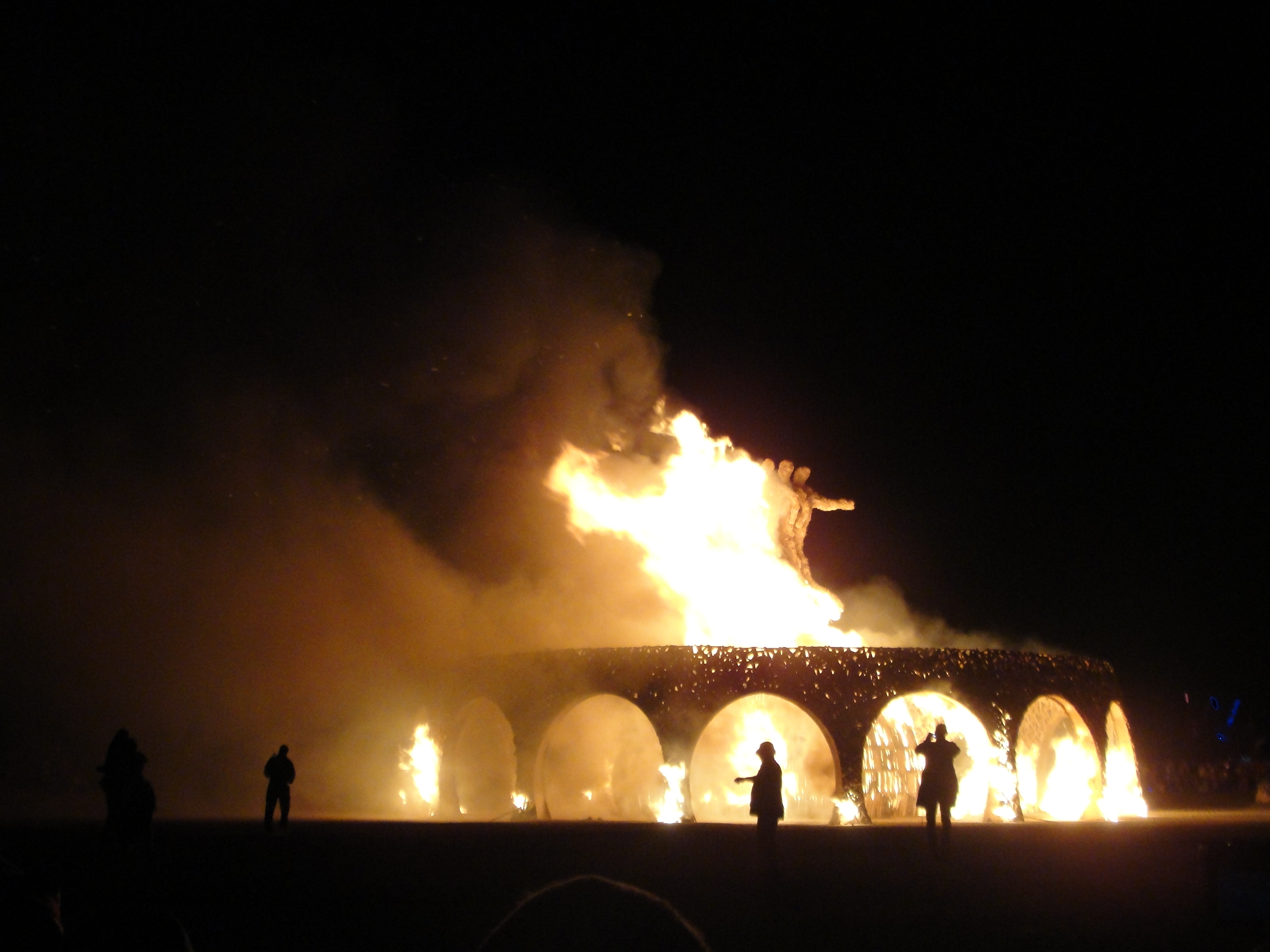
San Clan burn at AfrikaBurn 2015

By analogy to the Man at Burning Man, the main sculpture at the event is called the San Clan. It is designed to look like a San rock art glyph of a group of people. The intention is to convey the idea of unity and community at the event. Like some sculptures at the event, it is burnt. The burn used to take place on the Saturday night, but is now scheduled for Friday nights in order to accommodate weather delays and provide participants from far afield with more time to return home from the event. The original signifier, that of the many headed dancing clan spirit was first championed by Liane Visser.

== Temple ==
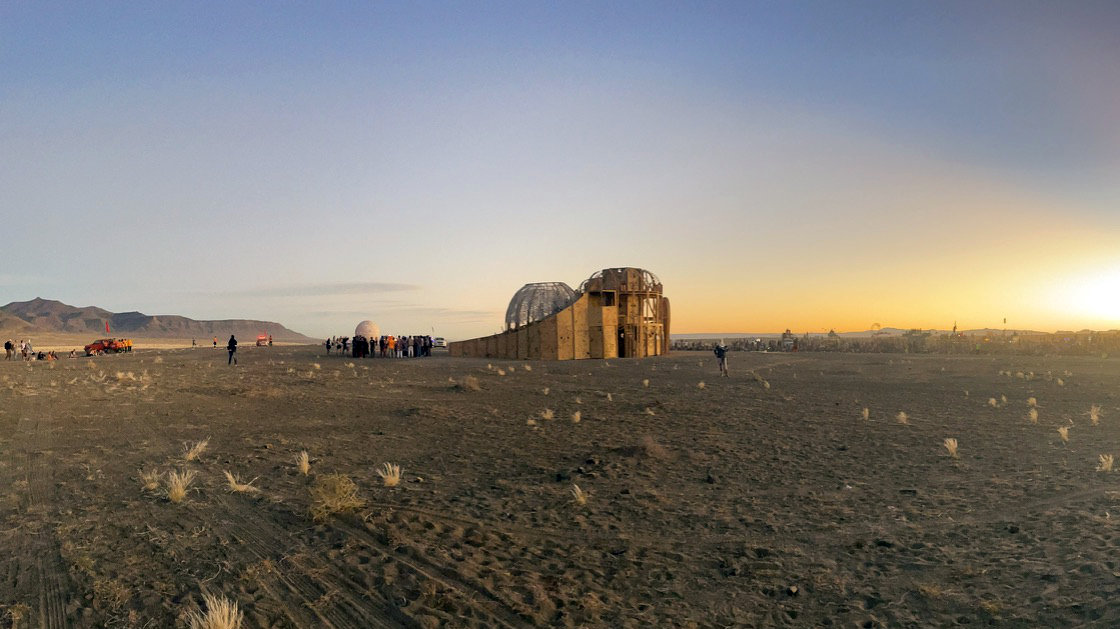
AfrikaBurn 2024 Landscape, with LuminEssence Temple Artwork by Carmel Ives & Crew

=== History of Temple Artworks at AfrikaBurn ===
- 2007 – [no title] (Brad Baard & Peter Hayes)
- 2008 – [No temple]
- 2009 – ‘The Temporal’ (Monique Schiess & Brad Baard)
- 2010 – [Same from 2009]
- 2011 – 'The Temple of Dust' (Adriaan Wessels)
- 2012 – ‘Solace’ (Simon Bannister and crew)
- 2013 – ‘Compression’ (Simon Bannister and crew)
- 2014 – ‘The Offering’ (Simon Bannister and crew)
- 2015 – ‘Metamorphosis’ (Verity Maud and crew)
- 2016 – ‘Awakening’ (Verity Maud and crew)
- – ‘Temple of |Xam’ (Kim Goodwin and The Dandylions)
- 2017 – ‘Temple of Gratitude’ (Walter Böhmer and crew)
- 2018 – ‘Oasis’ (Anushka Kempken and crew)
- 2019 – ‘Temple of Stars’ (Walter Böhmer & The Starlights)
- 2022 – ‘Gaia's Song’ (Carmel Ives)
- 2023 – ‘Transcendence’ (Carmel Ives)
- 2024 – ‘LuminEssence’ (Carmel Ives)

== Culture ==
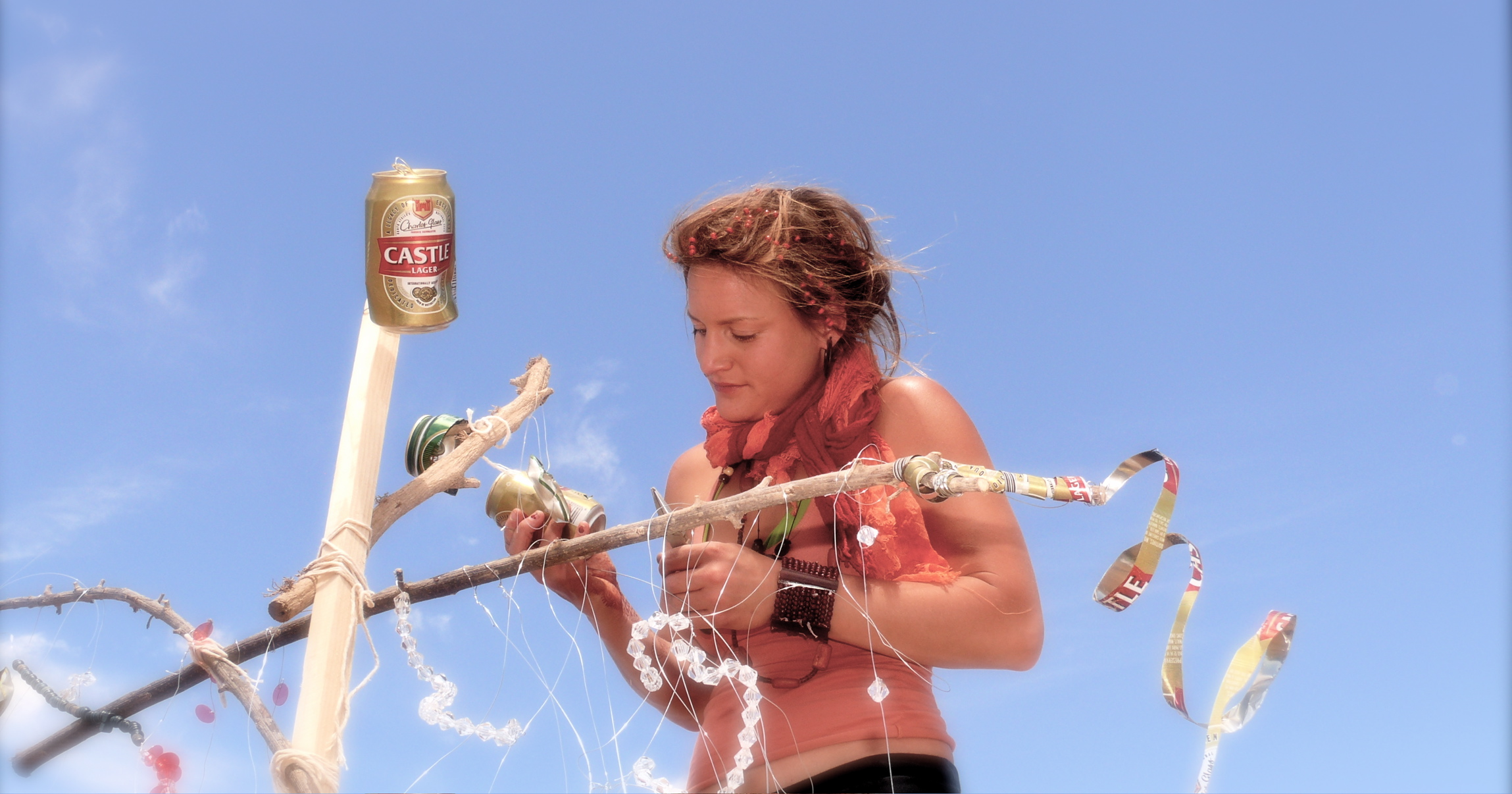
An artist at AfrikaBurn 2007

As a regional Burning Man event, AfrikaBurn adheres to the ten principles of Burning Man and added another in 2014. Among these guiding principles are the Leave No Trace philosophy, radical self-expression and self-reliance, and communal effort. The 11th principle, 'Each One Teach One', was added to encourage the sharing of knowledge throughout the community, in order to ensure the uptake of culture matches the growth in numbers. The event has a gift economy, which means nothing is for sale or exchange.

In April 2019, the content of the Radical Inclusion principle was modified to "address [...] systemic injustice". An "inclusivity guide" was added with information on "racism, micro-aggressions, white privilege and fragility".

Pets are not allowed at the event. This is due to concerns for the safety of both the animals (loud noises and an inhospitable environment), and the participants. In addition, fireworks, flares and fire lanterns are not permitted.

Theme camps are one of the key components of vibrant regional Burning Man events. Theme camps are established by participants to enhance the experience for all participants.

Major theme camps from the last few years include "Alienz Coffee Shop", "BeDazzled", "Birthday Suits", "Burning Mail", "Camp Anvil", "Camp High Tea", "Camp Skaduwee", "Desert Magic", "Flow Arts Commune", "Fractal Chill Ethiopian Coffee House", "Love All Tennis", "Magical Mystery Mob", "New Beginnings", "Camp Now!", "Rust 'n Dust", "Smokescreen", "Space Cowboys", "State of Bliss", "Sunset Oasis", "The Emperor's New Theme Camp", "The Friend Zone", "The Grease Monkeys", "The Pancake People", "The Purple Spanking Booth", "The Steampunk Saloon", "The Tankwa Town Library", "The Theatre of Playful Banter", "The Vuvustasie", "The Wild Ass Saloon", "Vagabonds" and "WeR1 Soulstice". Each year, the number of Theme Camps grows in line with the increase in numbers.

"MOOP", or Matter Out Of Place, is the term for litter. Reducing and removing MOOP is part of the Leave No Trace philosophy.

AfrikaBurn also has its own community radio station, Radio Free Tankwa that originated from a theme camp (Radio ARRR). That broadcasts throughout the year online.

== Desert Mutant Vehicles ==
These mobile art pieces consist of motorised vessels whether it be cars, bikes, couches, bars, creatures or boomboxes, amongst other things. In order for an application to be approved, the vessel has to be significantly modified and must receive a licence from the Department of Mutant Vehicles (the DMV). The same rules apply to e-Bike, scooters, trikes and tuk tuks with over 400 Watts of power. Safety is of the utmost importance and there are several regulations in place to ensure a safe experience for everyone.
