= Keaton Henson =

English musician (born 1988)

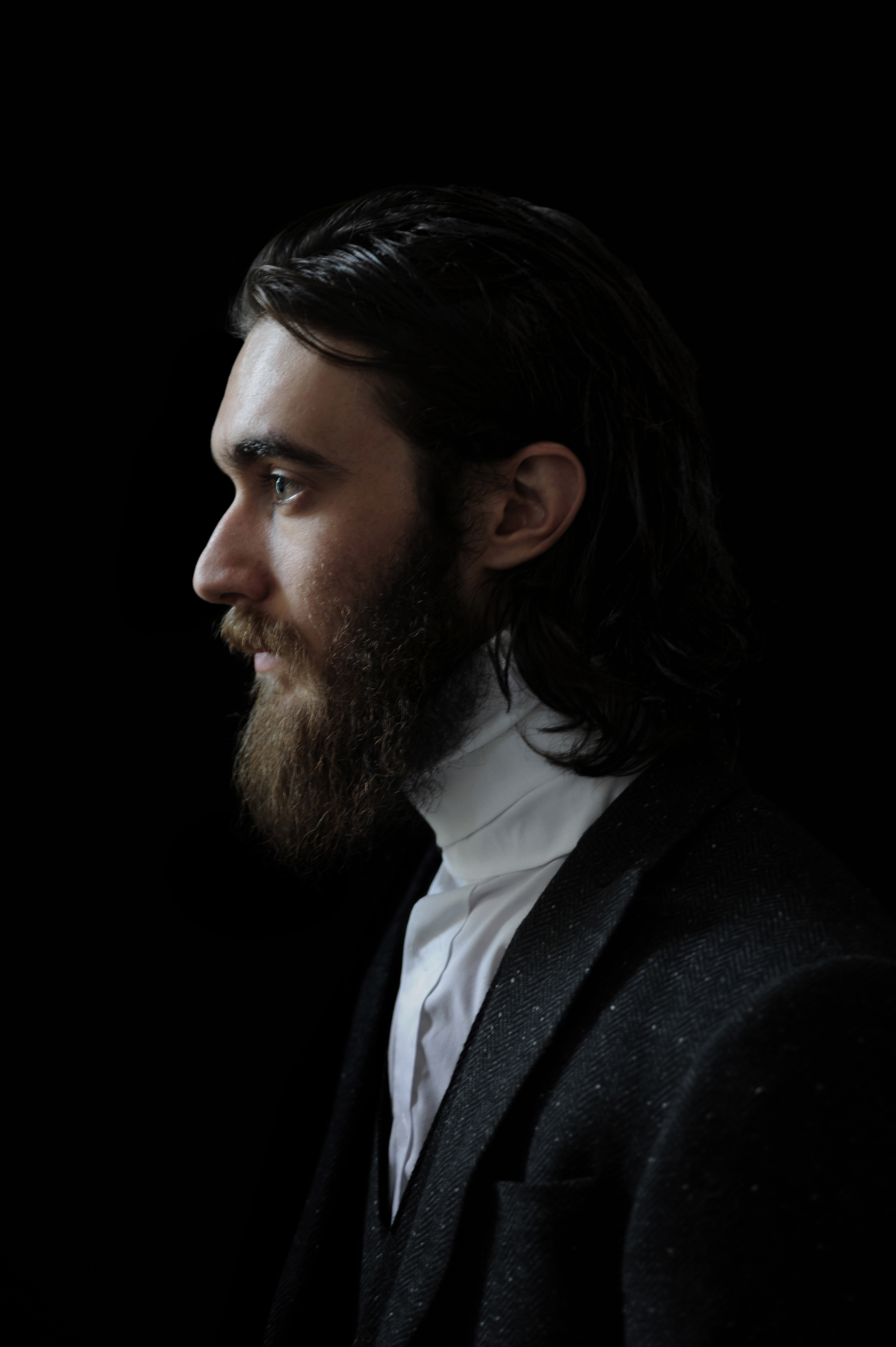
- Henson in 2012

Background information
- Born: 24 March 1988 (age 38); London, England
- Genres: Folk rock, classical, indie folk, rock
- Occupations: Singer-songwriter, visual artist, poet
- Instruments: Vocals, guitar, piano
- Years active: 2009–present
- Labels: Oak Ten Records, Mercury KX/Decca/Universal Classics
- Website: keatonhenson.com

Keaton Henson (born 24 March 1988) is an English musician, composer, visual artist, and poet. He has released six studio albums, a wordless graphic novel titled Gloaming, published by Pocko, and a book of poetry called Idiot Verse. Henson has anxiety, and as a result, he rarely plays concerts.

== History ==
=== Early life and career beginnings (1988–2012) ===
Keaton Henson was born in 1988 in London. He is the son of actor Nicky Henson and ballet dancer Marguerite Porter, and the half-brother of composer Christian Henson.

Henson began his career as an illustrator. He designed the artwork for various albums including Dananananaykroyd's Hey Everyone! and Enter Shikari's Take to the Skies. He recorded songs in his flat in London, initially purely for his own consumption. He gave a recording of one of the songs as a gift to his best friend, and was encouraged to put music online. In November 2010, his debut album Dear... was released on Motive Sounds Recordings, in a self-made limited edition. In 2011 he released the single "Metaphors" on Porchlight Records. He also recorded "Don't Be Afraid" for the Tormented soundtrack.

Henson's musical breakthrough came when Zane Lowe played "You Don't Know How Lucky You Are" on BBC Radio 1 for the first time on 7 September 2011, saying: "That piece of music right there...is one of the most special pieces of music I've heard in a very very long time". Lowe said that the reaction from listeners had been "brilliant".

Henson formed his own record company, Oak Ten Records, and officially re-released his debut album Dear... in 2012. The album was critically acclaimed: the BBC reported "Keaton Henson isn't a show-off, but with talent like this, he has every right to be". On Metacritic, the album received a score of 70 out of 100. Dear... didn't enter the charts, but three singles were released–"Charon", "Small Hands" and "You Don't Know How Lucky You Are"–all accompanied by music videos. The video for "Charon" was shortlisted for a UK MVA award in Best Budget Indie/Rock Category. "Small Hands" won Best Music Video at the Rushes Soho Shorts Film Festival in 2012.

In July 2012, Henson released The Lucky. In November 2012, Henson designed a t-shirt for the Yellow Bird Project to raise money for the Teenage Cancer Trust.

=== Birthdays and other projects (2013–2020) ===
Henson wrote and recorded his album Birthdays in less than a year. He travelled to California to record the album and worked with American producer Joe Chiccarelli. It was released in February 2013. The BBC stated: "Up there, warmed by the fire, he's cloistered away from Twitter and all the other evils of this parish. There's no better way to shut out the din than by putting this record on". A limited-edition version of the album was released featuring three bonus songs and a hand-painted piece of art taken from a large painting by Henson which had been cut into 196 pieces. Birthdays had three singles: "Lying to You", "Sweetheart, What Have You Done To Us", and "You" (released as a limited edition 7" single for Record Store Day with an etching by Henson on the b-side). The album was released as a limited book edition, featuring illustrations made by different artists accompanying the songs.

In 2012 and 2013, Henson performed sporadically, usually in small venues, galleries, or museums. His art show "Hithermost" took place at the Pertwee, Anderson & Gold gallery in London in January 2013 and "sold quickly". In August 2013, NPR Music published a live Tiny Desk Concert on its website and on YouTube. The songs performed included "You Don't Know How Lucky You Are", "Sweetheart What Have You Done to Us" and "You". In late 2013, he performed in three churches around England. On 16 June 2014, he performed at the Queen Elizabeth Hall in London as part of the James Lavelle-curated Meltdown festival. On the day of the concert, Henson released the album Romantic Works, featuring cellist Ren Ford. It was streamed exclusively on The Guardian website and later on Spotify.

In early 2015, Henson composed a score for Young Men, a dance project from BalletBoyz, which was performed at the Sadler's Wells Theatre in London as a co-production with 14–18 NOW. His first three albums were re-pressed on vinyl with bonus tracks in June 2015. In October 2015, he released an album as part a side project under the pseudonym Behaving. The album was more electronic sounding than his previous releases and was first streamed on SoundCloud and iTunes. The same month also saw the release of Idiot Verse, Henson's debut poetry collection.

In September 2016, Henson released Kindly Now. In July 2018, his Six Lethargies for string orchestra was premiered at the Barbican Centre by Britten Sinfonia. The 70-minute work was jointly commissioned by the Barbican, Vivid Sydney, and National Concert Hall, Dublin. It was performed at the Sydney Opera House and released as an LP in 2019.

=== Monument and Fragments (2020–2022) ===
In May 2020, Henson released his single "Career Day", his first release featuring vocals since "Epilogue". A follow-up single to 2016's Kindly Now, it was followed by the single "Ontario" in June. On 23 October 2020, Henson released Monument. The album features Philip Selway of Radiohead on drums and percussion. The album deals with his father Nicky Henson and his battle with a terminal illness. The album was completed two days before his father's death. A follow-up EP to 'Monument', 'Fragments' was released on 27 August 2021. Recorded at the same time as Monument, it features eight tracks, including "Marionette", a collaboration with Julien Baker, and the singles "Before Growing Old", "Limb", and "No Love Lost."

Henson also provided the music for the 2020 film Supernova directed by Harry Macqueen. The soundtrack was released by city Lakeshore Records on 29 January 2021.

=== Keaton's Party Playlist (2022-2023) ===
On 17 October 2022, Keaton released a video on his newly made TikTok account asking fans to request songs for him to perform covers of. Over the next two months, Keaton would release snippets of the requested covers to his TikTok account, eventually culminating in the release of the album, Keaton's Party Playlist, on 16 December 2022. The cover of Taylor Swift's Anti-Hero garnered over 100,000 views on TikTok.

=== House Party (2023–present) ===
On 9 June 2023, Keaton Henson released his seventh studio album House Party. "Envy" was released on 15 February 2023, accompanied by a music video. In interviews, Keaton mentioned that the concept of the album is from an alternative timeline in which an alternative Keaton Henson embraces the limelight and pursues fame, abandoning friends and family whilst simultaneously winding up all alone in the process.

"The Meeting Place" was released on 15 March 2023 accompanied by an animation video; described in reviews and interviews as something on the soundtrack of "10 Things I Hate About You". "I'm Not There" was released on 26 April accompanied by a music video. On 24 May 2023, "Late To You" was released accompanied by a music video.

== Collaborations ==
Henson has appeared on The Flight's EP Hangman, The Staves EP Mexico and with the London electronic group Unkle on several tracks including "Farewell", "Sonata" and "Sick Lullaby" from The Road: Part 1 and "The First Time I Ever Saw Your Face" from The Road: Part II (Lost Highway). He has co-writing and vocal credits on Daudi Matsiko's "King of Misery" (from the 2024 album The King of Misery).

== Discography ==
Year	Title
2010/2012	Dear...: Released: 2010; 2 April 2012; Format: CD, LP and digital download
2011	B-Sides and Rarities: Released: 13 May 2011; Format: CD, EP
2013	Birthdays: Released: 25 February 2013; Format: CD, LP and digital download
2014	Romantic Works featuring Ren Ford: Released: 16 June 2014; Format: CD, limited LP and digital download
2015	Behaving: Released: 7 October 2015; Format: Limited LP and Digital download
2015	5 Years: Released: 12 November 2015; Format: Limited CD
2016	Kindly Now: Released: 16 September 2016; Format: CD, LP and digital download
2019	Six Lethargies: Released: 25 October 2019; Format: CD, 3-sided LP
2020	Monument: Released: 23 October 2020; Format: CD, LP and digital download
2021	Fragments: Released: 27 August 2021; Format: Digital download
2022	Keaton's Party Playlist: Released: 16 December 2022; Format: Digital download
2023	House Party: Released: 9 June 2023; Format: CD, LP and digital download
2024	Somnambulant Cycles: Released: 31 May 2024; Format: CD, LP and digital download
2025	Parader: Released: 21 November 2025; Format: CD, LP and digital download

== Concerts and tours ==
Year	Location	Title
12 December 2011	Maida Vale Studios, London, England	Festive Festival
4 October 2012	The Cinema Museum, London, England	The Cinema Museum
7 February 2013	The Jeffrey Room at the Mitchell Library, Glasgow, Scotland	Museum Tour 2013
1 February 2013	Preston Park Museum, Stockton-on-Tees, England	Museum Tour 2013
14 February 2013	Manchester Museum, Manchester, England	Museum Tour 2013
18 February 2013	Freud Museum, London, England	Museum Tour 2013
28 February 2013	History of Science Museum, Oxford, England	Museum Tour 2013
1 March 2013	History of Science Museum, Oxford, England	Museum Tour 2013
8 March 2013	Booth Museum Of Natural History, Brighton, England	Museum Tour 2013
8 April 2013	Housing Works Bookstore Cafe, New York, U.S.	Housing Works Bookstore Cafe
9 October 2013	The Chapel, San Francisco, California, U.S.	The Chapel, San Francisco
11 April 2013	Masonic Lodge at Hollywood Forever, Los Angeles, California, U.S.	Masonic Lodge at Hollywood Forever
12 September 2013	Emmanuel Centre, London, England	Emmanuel Centre
11 October 2013	The Methodist Church of Echo Park, Los Angeles, California, U.S.	The Methodist Church
19 October 2013	St Bartholomew's Church, Brighton, England	St Bartholomew's Church
29 October 2013	St Andrew's in the Square, Glasgow, Scotland	St Andrew's in the Square
5 November 2013	Église Saint-Eustache, Paris, France	Les Inrocks Festival 2013
7 November 2013	Geertekerk, Utrecht, Netherlands	Geertekerk
11 November 2013	Town Hall, Manchester, England	Town Hall
16 May 2014	Queen Elizabeth Hall, London, England	Queen Elizabeth Hall
11 May 2015	Royal Concertgebouw, Amsterdam, Netherlands	Holland Festival 2015
15 August 2015	National Concert Hall, Dublin, Ireland	National Concert Hall
27 November 2015	Church of the Resurrection, Katowice, Poland	XXIV Festival Ars Cameralis
4 February 2016	Roundhouse, London, England	Roundhouse
10 June 2016	New Theatre, Cardiff, Wales	Festival Of Voice
23 October 2016	Café de la Danse, Paris, France	Café de la Danse
26 October 2016	Passionskirche, Berlin, Germany	Passionskirche
1 November 2016	Royal Theatre Carré (Koninklijk Theater Carré), Amsterdam, Netherlands	Royal Theatre Carré
18 November 2016	London Palladium, London, England	London Palladium
14 January 2017	Masonic Lodge at Hollywood Forever, Los Angeles, California, U.S.	Masonic Lodge at Hollywood Forever
17 January 2017	The Great Hall, Toronto, Canada	The Great Hall
30 January 2017	Konzerthaus, Vienna, Austria	Konzerthaus
11 February 2017	Olympia Theatre, Dublin, Ireland	Olympia Theatre
31 May 2019	Sydney Opera House, Australia	Vivid Festival
