= Six Lethargies =

Studio album by Keaton Henson
- Released: 25 October 2019
- Length: 1:04:52
- Label: Mercury KX

Keaton Henson chronology
Kindly Now (2016)	Six Lethargies (2019)	Monument (2020)

Professional ratings
Aggregate scores
Source	Rating
Metacritic	75/100
Review scores
Source	Rating
AllMusic	3.5/5 stars
Loud and Quiet	6/10
MusicOMH	4.5/5 stars

Six Lethargies is a studio album by English musician Keaton Henson. It was released on 25 October 2019 under Mercury KX.

The album was written by Henson, and performed by Royal Liverpool Philharmonic Orchestra.

== Background ==
In an interview, Keaton Henson stated that the album took three years to make, with Royal Liverpool Philharmonic Orchestra performing majority of the music.

== Critical reception ==
Six Lethargies was met with generally favourable reviews from critics. At Metacritic, which assigns a weighted average rating out of 100 to reviews from mainstream publications, this release received an average score of 75, based on 4 reviews.

== Track listing ==
Six Lethargies track listing
No.	Title	Writer(s)	Length
1.	"Initium"	Keaton Henson, Royal Liverpool Philharmonic Orchestra	9:33
2.	"The Falling"	Keaton Henson, Royal Liverpool Philharmonic Orchestra	11:32
3.	"Trauma / In Chao"	Keaton Henson, Royal Liverpool Philharmonic Orchestra	6:48
4.	"Unease Concerto - Cadenza"	Keaton Henson, Royal Liverpool Philharmonic Orchestra	3:35
5.	"Unease Concerto"	Keaton Henson, Royal Liverpool Philharmonic Orchestra	10:19
6.	"Lament"	Keaton Henson, Royal Liverpool Philharmonic Orchestra	10:34
7.	"Breathing Out"	Keaton Henson, Royal Liverpool Philharmonic Orchestra	12:21
