= Graza =

Olive oil company

- Type: Private
- Industry: Food
- Founded: 2021
- Website: graza.co

Graza is an olive oil company known for its Spanish extra virgin olive oil packaged in squeeze bottles. According to Food Network, it was the fifth largest brand of olive oil in the United States as of August 2025; Inc. reported that by November 2025, it was "already an industry leader, representing 24 percent of the total olive oil growth in 2025."

== History ==
In 2022, Graza released two olive oil products in squeezable bottles: Drizzle, "for dipping or finishing touches," and Sizzle, "for searing, baking, roasting, dressing, and frying." It focused on creator partnerships, social media, email marketing, and blog posts to drive company growth, with email marketing being "Graza's most reliable revenue driver."

In February 2025, Graza released its olive oils in a spray bottle format, as well as a Frizzle olive oil for frying. In August, Graza released olive oil refills in aluminum cans after receiving consumer feedback about packaging sustainability. Later, in November, released Drizzle and Sizzle in glass bottles with "their own pop-up pour spout." The new glass bottles were marketed with a collaborative ad campaign with Quality Meats.

== Other products ==
In November 2025, Graza announced that it would be releasing a Pinot Meunier wine in collaboration with Limited Addition Wines and MYSA Natural Wine.

In the same month, Graza collaborated with Yahoo on the "Sssshhhhizzle" Keyboard Oil, an office-themed holiday gift set which includes a redesigned bottle of Sizzle, a tray, and a baseball cap.

== Critical reception ==
In 2025, Wirecutter called Graza's Sizzle olive oil "the best all-purpose oil we tested." Food & Wine named Graza's duo set of Drizzle and Sizzle as the best value set.
