= James Lavelle =

English musician (born 1974)

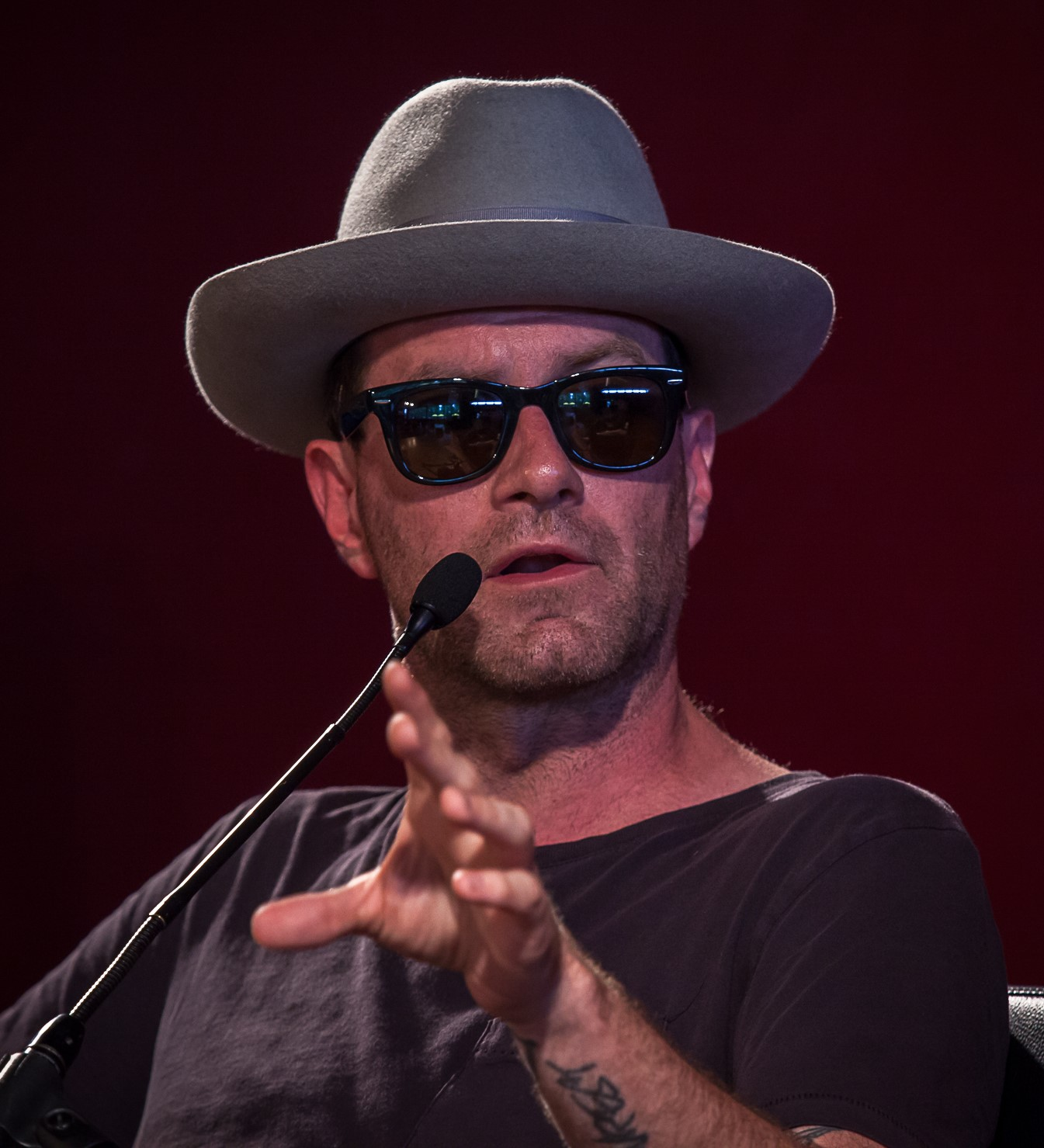
- Lavelle in June 2014

Background information
- Born: 22 February 1974 (age 52); Oxford, England
- Origin: London, England
- Genres: Electronic; trip hop; alternative rock
- Occupations: DJ; musician; record producer; songwriter
- Years active: 1990–present
- Member of: Unkle

James Lavelle (born 22 February 1974) is an English electronic musician, record label owner and curator. He founded the Mo'Wax record label in 1992, and has been the only constant member of Unkle.

== Career ==
Lavelle was born and grew up in Oxford. He ran a club night in Oxford called Mo Wax Please while working at Bluebird record store in London. He later moved to London and worked for Honest Jon's and contributed a column to Straight No Chaser.

He founded his own record label Mo' Wax in 1992. The label was not co-founded by Tim Goldsworthy, as is often reported. Mo' Wax released albums by DJ Shadow, Dr. Octagon, and Lavelle's own Unkle project.

Lavelle is a longtime resident at Fabric in London, mixing the inaugural Fabric Live mix album. He has also mixed four DJ mix albums for Global Underground, and soundtracks to the films Sexy Beast and Shelter, and TV series Trust. Lavelle also produced the title track for Queens of the Stone Age's 2013 album ...Like Clockwork.

In 2014 he was asked to direct the Meltdown festival, following in the footsteps of David Bowie, Yoko Ono, and Jarvis Cocker. His lineup included concerts by Josh Homme, Max Richter, Neneh Cherry, Goldie and Mark Lanegan. The event culminated with a live UNKLE:Redux featuring a guest appearance from former member DJ Shadow.

Lavelle later curated the 2016 exhibition "Daydreaming with Stanley Kubrick" at Somerset House. He was the subject of 2016 documentary film The Man from Mo'Wax.

== Selected discography ==
=== UNKLE ===
- Psyence Fiction (1998)
- Never, Never, Land (2003)
- War Stories (2007)
- Where Did the Night Fall (2010)
- The Road: Part I (2017)
- The Road: Part II (Lost Highway) (2019)

=== Mix albums ===
- Cream Live Two – Disc 3 (1996)
- Tribal Gathering 96 – Disc 3 (1998)
- FabricLive.01 (2001)
- GU023 Global Underground, Barcelona (2002)
- Do Androids Dream of Electric Beats? (2001)
- Do Androids Dream of Essential Beats? (2003)
- GU026 Global Underground, Romania (2004)
- GU037 Global Underground, Bangkok (2009)
- GU041 Global Underground, Naples (2015)

== Quotes ==
- "I became a DJ because I couldn't breakdance and I was no good at graffiti."
- "I'm into a whole concept, it's a whole scene. I'm totally involved in it. We cover hip-hop fused music. We want to do this rock hip-hop thing. We are gonna launch a mad hip-hop/thrash fused band, a young Beastie Boys kind of thing. I'm into the total energy of the Beasties and that whole kind of skate thing. I want that energy and total madness surrounding the whole idea."
- On Mo' Wax: "We put out 200 records in 4 or 5 years, I don’t think I’d ever be able to do that again. I don’t think I could ever work like that again, it was just insane."
