= List of crime films of the 2020s =

This is a list of crime films released in the 2020s.

== 2020 ==
Title	Director	Cast	Country	Subgenre/Notes
Archenemy	Adam Egypt Mortimer	Joe Manganiello, Skylan Brooks, Zolee Griggs, Paul Scheer, Amy Seimetz, Glenn Howerton	United States, United Kingdom	Superhero, mystery, thriller
Bad Boys for Life	Adil & Bilall	Will Smith, Martin Lawrence, Paola Núñez, Vanessa Hudgens, Alexander Ludwig, Charles Melton, Jacob Scipio, Kate del Castillo, Nicky Jam, Joe Pantoliano	United States	Action comedy
Birds of Prey	Cathy Yan	Margot Robbie, Mary Elizabeth Winstead, Jurnee Smollett-Bell, Rosie Perez	United States	Superhero, crime, comedy
Capone	Josh Trank	Tom Hardy, Linda Cardellini, Jack Lowden, Noel Fisher, Kyle MacLachlan, Matt Dillon, Al Sapienza	United States	Crime biopic
Coffee & Kareem	Michael Dowse	Ed Helms, Terrence Little Gardenhigh, Betty Gilpin, Taraji P. Henson	United States	Action comedy
Collectors	Park Jung-bae	Lee Je-hoon, Jo Woo-jin, Shin Hye-sun, Im Won-hee	South Korea	Heist caper
Cut Throat City	RZA	Shameik Moore, Kat Graham, Wesley Snipes, T.I.	United States	Heist
Enola Holmes	Harry Bradbeer	Millie Bobby Brown, Sam Claflin, Henry Cavill, Helena Bonham Carter	United States	Mystery
Fatale	Deon Taylor	Hilary Swank, Michael Ealy, Mike Colter	United States	Action thriller
Hand Rolled Cigarette	Chan Kin-long	Gordon Lam	Hong Kong	Crime drama
Hitman: Agent Jun	Choi Won-sub	Kwon Sang-woo, Jung Joon-ho, Hwang Woo-seul-hye, Lee Yi-kyung	South Korea	Action comedy
Honest Thief	Mark Williams	Liam Neeson, Kate Walsh, Jai Courtney, Jeffrey Donovan	United States	Action thriller
Kajillionaire	Miranda July	Evan Rachel Wood, Debra Winger, Gina Rodriguez, Richard Jenkins	United States	Crime comedy
Mafia: Chapter 1	Karthick Naren	Arun Vijay, Prasanna, Priya Bhavani Shankar, Thalaivasal Vijay	India	Action, crime
Night in Paradise	Park Hoon-jung	Uhm Tae-goo, Jeon Yeo-been, Cha Seung-won	South Korea	Crime drama
Spenser Confidential	Peter Berg	Mark Wahlberg, Winston Duke, Alan Arkin, Iliza Shlesinger, Bokeem Woodbine, Marc Maron, Post Malone	United States	Action, comedy
Target Number One	Daniel Roby	Antoine Olivier Pilon, Stephen McHattie, Don McKellar, J. C. MacKenzie, Amanda Crew, Jim Gaffigan, Josh Hartnett	Canada	True crime
The Gentlemen	Guy Ritchie	Matthew McConaughey, Charlie Hunnam, Henry Golding, Michelle Dockery	United Kingdom, United States	Crime, action, comedy
The Last Days of American Crime	Olivier Megaton	Édgar Ramírez, Anna Brewster, Michael Pitt, Sharlto Copley	United States	Action thriller
The Rhythm Section	Reed Morano	Blake Lively, Jude Law, Sterling K. Brown	United States	Action thriller
The Tax Collector	David Ayer	Bobby Soto, Cinthya Carmona, George Lopez, Shia LaBeouf	United States	Action-crime thriller
Yaara	Tigmanshu Dhulia	Vidyut Jammwal, Shruti Haasan, Amit Sadh, Vijay Varma, Kenny Basumatary, Ankur Vikal	India	Crime drama

== 2021 ==
Title	Director	Cast	Country	Subgenres/notes
Akshara	B. Chinni Krishna	Nandita Swetha, Sritej, Shakalaka Shankar, Ajay Ghosh, Satya, Madhunandan	India	Crime thriller
Body Brokers	John Swab	Jack Kilmer, Michael Kenneth Williams, Jessica Rothe, Alice Englert, Peter Greene, Frank Grillo, Melissa Leo	United States	Crime thriller
Cold Case	Tanu Balak	Prithviraj Sukumaran	India	Crime thriller
Crime Story	Adam Lipsius	Richard Dreyfuss, Mira Sorvino	United States	Crime drama thriller
Cruella	Craig Gillespie	Emma Stone, Emma Thompson, Joel Fry, Paul Walter Hauser, Emily Beecham, Kirby Howell-Baptiste, Mark Strong	United States	Crime comedy
Drishyam 2	Jeethu Joseph	Mohanlal, Meena, Ansiba Hassan, Esther Anil	India	Crime drama thriller
Ida Red	John Swab	Melissa Leo, Frank Grillo, Josh Hartnett	United States	Crime drama
Locked Down	Doug Liman	Anne Hathaway, Chiwetel Ejiofor, Ben Stiller, Stephen Merchant, Dulé Hill, Jazmyn Simon, Mark Gatiss, Mindy Kaling, Ben Kingsley, Lucy Boynton	United States	Heist, rom-com
No Sudden Move	Steven Soderbergh	Don Cheadle, Benicio del Toro, David Harbour, Amy Seimetz, Jon Hamm, Ray Liotta, Kieran Culkin, Noah Jupe, Brendan Fraser, Bill Duke, Frankie Shaw, Julia Fox	United States	Crime thriller
Nobody	Ilya Naishuller	Bob Odenkirk, Connie Nielsen, RZA, Aleksei Serebryakov, Christopher Lloyd	United States	Action thriller
Silk Road	Tiller Russell	Jason Clarke, Nick Robinson, Katie Aselton, Jimmi Simpson, Daniel David Stewart, Darrell Britt-Gibson, Lexi Rabe, Will Ropp, Paul Walter Hauser, Alexandra Shipp	United States	Crime thriller
The Birthday Cake	Jimmy Giannopoulos	Shiloh Fernandez, Val Kilmer, Ewan McGregor, Ashley Benson, Lorraine Bracco, David Mazouz	United States	Crime drama
The Gateway	Michele Civetta	Shea Whigham, Olivia Munn, Zach Avery, Taryn Manning, Mark Boone Junior, Keith David, Frank Grillo, Bruce Dern	United States	Crime thriller
The Guilty	Antoine Fuqua	Jake Gyllenhaal, Ethan Hawke, Peter Sarsgaard, Riley Keough, Paul Dano, Byron Bowers, Da'Vine Joy Randolph, David Castaneda	United States	Crime thriller
The Hitman's Wife's Bodyguard	Patrick Hughes	Ryan Reynolds, Samuel L. Jackson, Salma Hayek, Frank Grillo, Richard E. Grant	United States	Action comedy
The Little Things	John Lee Hancock	Denzel Washington, Rami Malek, Jared Leto	United States	Crime thriller
The Many Saints of Newark	Alan Taylor	Alessandro Nivola, Leslie Odom Jr., Jon Bernthal, Corey Stoll, Michael Gandolfini, Billy Magnussen, John Magaro, Michela De Rossi, Ray Liotta, Vera Farmiga	United States	Crime drama
The Virtuoso	Nick Stagliano	Anson Mount, Abbie Cornish, Anthony Hopkins	United States	Neo-noir crime thriller
Twist	Martin Owen	Rafferty Law, Michael Caine, Lena Headey, Rita Ora, Sophie Simnett	United Kingdom	Crime drama
Wrath of Man	Guy Ritchie	Jason Statham, Holt McCallany, Scott Eastwood, Jeffrey Donovan, Laz Alonso, Josh Hartnett, Post Malone	United States	Action-crime thriller

== 2022 ==
Title	Director	Cast	Country	Subgenre/notes
Amsterdam	David O. Russell	Christian Bale, Margot Robbie, John David Washington, Chris Rock, Anya Taylor-Joy, Zoe Saldaña, Mike Myers, Michael Shannon, Timothy Olyphant, Andrea Riseborough, Taylor Swift, Matthias Schoenaerts, Alessandro Nivola, Rami Malek, Robert De Niro	United States	Period mystery comedy
Bhamakalapam	Abhimanyu	Priyamani, John Vijay, Shanthi Rao, Sharanya Pradeep	India	Crime comedy thriller
Capturing the Killer Nurse	Tim Travers Hawkins	Charles Cullen, Amy Loughren	United Kingdom, United States	Crime
Catwoman: Hunted	Shinsuke Terasawa	Elizabeth Gillies, Stephanie Beatriz, Jonathan Banks, Steve Blum, Lauren Cohan, Keith David, Zehra Fazal, Jonathan Frakes, Kirby Howell-Baptiste, Kelly Hu, Andrew Kishino, Eric Lopez, Jacqueline Obradors, Ron Yuan	United States	Superhero, crime thriller
A Day to Die	Wes Miller	Bruce Willis, Frank Grillo, Leon Robinson, Kevin Dillon	United States	Action, heist
Death on the Nile	Kenneth Branagh	Kenneth Branagh, Tom Bateman, Annette Bening, Russell Brand, Ali Fazal, Dawn French, Gal Gadot, Armie Hammer, Rose Leslie, Emma Mackey, Sophie Okonedo, Jennifer Saunders, Letitia Wright	United States, United Kingdom	Mystery thriller
Enola Holmes 2	Harry Bradbeer	Millie Bobby Brown, Henry Cavill, Louis Partridge, Adeel Akhtar, Susie Wokoma, Sharon Duncan-Brewster, David Thewlis, Helena Bonham Carter	United States	Mystery
Glass Onion: A Knives Out Mystery	Rian Johnson	Daniel Craig, Dave Bautista, Janelle Monae, Edward Norton, Kathryn Hahn, Leslie Odom Jr.	United States	Mystery, crime comedy
Marlowe	Neil Jordan	Liam Neeson, Diane Kruger, Jessica Lange, Adewale Akinnuoye-Agbaje, Alan Cumming, Danny Huston, Ian Hart, Colm Meaney, Daniela Melchior, François Arnaud	United States	Neo-nior thriller
Oppanda	S.S.Sameer	Arjun Sarja, Radhika Kumaraswamy, J. D. Chakravarthy	India	Romance, crime, action
See How They Run	Tom George	Sam Rockwell, Saoirse Ronan, Adrien Brody, Ruth Wilson, Reece Shearsmith, Harris Dickinson, David Oyelowo	United States	Murder mystery, comedy
The American Dream	Dr. Vighnesh Koushik	Prince Cecil, Neha Krishna	India	Crime thriller
The Bad Guys	Pierre Perifel	Sam Rockwell, Awkwafina, Anthony Ramos, Marc Maron, Craig Robinson, Zazie Beetz, Lilly Singh, Alex Borstein, Richard Ayoade	United States	Animated heist comedy
The Batman	Matt Reeves	Robert Pattinson, Zoë Kravitz, Paul Dano, Jeffrey Wright, John Turturro, Peter Sarsgaard, Jayme Lawson, Andy Serkis, Colin Farrell	United States	Superhero, action, crime thriller
The Good Nurse	Tobias Lindholm	Jessica Chastain, Eddie Redmayne, Nnamdi Asomugha, Noah Emmerich, Kim Dickens	United States	Crime thriller
The Killer	David Fincher	Michael Fassbender, Tilda Swinton	United States	Crime thriller
The Outfit	Graham Moore	Mark Rylance, Zoey Deutch, Johnny Flynn, Dylan O'Brien, Nikki Amuka-Bird, Simon Russell Beale	United States	Crime drama
Vengeance	B.J. Novak	B. J. Novak, Boyd Holbrook, J. Smith-Cameron, Lio Tipton, Dove Cameron, Issa Rae, Ashton Kutcher	United States	Black comedy, mystery thriller

== 2023 ==
Title	Director	Cast	Country	Subgenre/notes
A Haunting in Venice	Kenneth Branagh	Kenneth Branagh, Kyle Allen, Camille Cottin, Jamie Dornan, Tina Fey, Jude Hill, Ali Rehman Khan, Emma Laird, Kelly Reilly, Riccardo Scamarcio, Michelle Yeoh	United States, United Kingdom	Mystery thriller
City of Love	Èric Boadella	Robert DeCesare, Kathryn Schott, Taylor Nichols, Mario Tardón	United States	Comedic crime thriller
Failure!	Alex Kahuam	Ted Raimi, Merrick McCartha, Noel Douglas Orput, Melissa Diaz, Christin Muuli, Daniel Kuhlman, LeVar Michael, Spencer Langston	United States	Crime comedy
Finestkind	Brian Helgeland	Ben Foster, Toby Wallace, Jenna Ortega, Tommy Lee Jones	United States	Crime thriller, drama
Hemet, or the Landlady Don't Drink Tea	Tony Olmos	Kimberly Weinberger, Brian Patrick Butler, Aimee La Joie, Randy Davison, Merrick McCartha, Matthew Rhodes, Nick Young, Pierce Wallace, Derrick Acosta, Mark Atkinson	United States	Crime comedy thriller
John Wick: Chapter 4	Chad Stahelski	Keanu Reeves, Donnie Yen, Bill Skarsgård, Laurence Fishburne, Lance Reddick, Clancy Brown, Scott Adkins, Hiroyuki Sanada, Ian McShane	United States	Action thriller
Kill Boksoon	Byun Sung-hyun	Jeon Do-yeon, Sul Kyung-gu, Kim Si-a, Esom, Koo Kyo-hwan	South Korea	Crime action
Killers of the Flower Moon	Martin Scorsese	Leonardo DiCaprio, Robert De Niro, Lily Gladstone, Jesse Plemons	United States	Crime drama, Western
Luther: The Fallen Sun	Jamie Payne	Idris Elba, Cynthia Erivo, Andy Serkis	United Kingdom, United States	Crime drama
Murder Mystery 2	Jeremy Garelick	Adam Sandler, Jennifer Aniston, Mark Strong, Mélanie Laurent, Jodie Turner-Smith, John Kani	United States	Mystery comedy
Reptile	Grant Singer	Benicio del Toro, Justin Timberlake, Alicia Silverstone	United States	Mystery crime thriller
Sound of Freedom	Alejandro Monteverde	Jim Caviezel, Mira Sorvino, Bill Camp	United States	Christian crime thriller
The Killer	David Fincher	Michael Fassbender, Arliss Howard, Charles Parnell, Kerry O'Malley, Sala Baker, Sophie Charlotte, Tilda Swinton	United States, France	Neo-noir crime thriller
They Cloned Tyrone	Juel Taylor	John Boyega, Teyonah Parris, Jamie Foxx	United States	Sci-fi comedy mystery

== 2024 ==
Title	Director	Cast	Country	Subgenre/notes
24 Hours with Gaspar	Yosep Anggi Noen	Reza Rahadian, Shenina Cinnamon, Laura Basuki, Kristo Immanuel, Sal Priadi, Iswadi Pratama	Indonesia	Crime drama
Armor	Justin Routt	Sylvester Stallone, Jason Patric, Josh Wiggins, Dash Mihok	United States	Action thriller
Bad Boys: Ride or Die	Arbi & Fallah	Will Smith, Martin Lawrence, Vanessa Hudgens, Alexander Ludwig, Paola Núñez, Eric Dane, Ioan Gruffudd, Rhea Seehorn, Jacob Scipio, Melanie Liburd, Tasha Smith, Tiffany Haddish, Joe Pantoliano	United States	Buddy cop action comedy
Beverly Hills Cop: Axel F	Mark Molloy	Eddie Murphy, Judge Reinhold, John Ashton, Paul Reiser, Bronson Pinchot, Taylour Paige, Joseph Gordon-Levitt	United States	Action crime comedy
Citizen of a Kind	Park Young-ju	Ra Mi-ran, Gong Myung, Yeom Hye-ran, Park Byung-eun, Jang Yoon-ju, Lee Moo-saeng, Ahn Eun-jin	South Korea	Crime drama
Cult Killer	Jon Keeyes	Alice Eve, Shelley Hennig, Paul Reid, Antonio Banderas	United States	Action crime thriller
Emilia Pérez	Jacques Audiard	Zoe Saldaña, Karla Sofía Gascón, Selena Gomez	France	Musical crime comedy
Greedy People	Potsy Ponciroli	Joseph Gordon-Levitt, Lily James, Himesh Patel, Tim Blake Nelson, Traci Lords, Simon Rex, Joey Lauren Adams, Uzo Aduba, Jim Gaffigan	United States	Crime-comedy mystery
Kenda	Sahadev Kelvadi	B V Brahath, Pranav Sridhar, Vinod Susheela, Satish Kumar, Gopalkrishna Deshpande	India	Crime Thriller
Lift	F. Gary Gray	Kevin Hart, Sam Worthington, Burn Gorman, Jean Reno, Jacob Batalon, Gugu Mbatha-Raw, Vincent D'Onofrio, Billy Magnussen, Úrsula Corberó, Yun Jee Kim, Viveik Kalra, Paul Anderson	United States	Heist thriller
Love Lies Bleeding	Rose Glass	Kristen Stewart, Katy O'Brian, Jena Malone, Anna Baryshnikov, Dave Franco, Ed Harris	United States	Romantic crime thriller
Megamind vs. the Doom Syndicate	Eric Fogel	Keith Ferguson, Laura Post, Josh Brener, Maya Aoki Tuttle, Emily Tunon, Talon Warburton, Scott Adsit, Chris Sullivan, Tony Hale, Jeanine Mason, Adam Lambert	United States	Animated superhero crime comedy
Operation Raavan	Venkata Satya	Rakshit Atluri, Sangeerthana Vipin, Raghu Kunche, Radhika Sarathkumar, Charan Raj, Vinod Sagar, S. S. Kanchi, Rocket Raghava, Murthy Devagupthapu	India	Crime thriller
Riff Raff	Dito Montiel	Jennifer Coolidge, Dustin Hoffman, Brian Cox, Gabrielle Union, Pete Davidson, Ed Harris, Bill Murray	United States	Crime comedy
Skincare	Austin Peters	Elizabeth Banks, Lewis Pullman, Michaela Jaé Rodriguez, Luis Gerardo Méndez, Nathan Fillion	United States	Crime thriller
The Clean Up Crew	Jon Keeyes	Jonathan Rhys Meyers, Swen Temmel, Ekaterina Baker, Melissa Leo, Antonio Banderas	United States	Action crime comedy
The Instigators	Doug Liman	Matt Damon, Casey Affleck, Hong Chau, Paul Walter Hauser, Michael Stuhlbarg, Jack Harlow, Toby Jones, Ving Rhames, Alfred Molina, Ron Perlman	United States	Heist thriller
The Killer	John Woo	Omar Sy, Nathalie Emmanuel, Sam Worthington, Diana Silvers, Eric Cantona, Tchéky Karyo, Grégory Montel	United States	Action crime thriller
Tillu Square	Mallik Ram	Siddhu Jonnalagadda, Anupama Parameswaran	India	Romantic crime comedy
Trap	M. Night Shyamalan	Josh Hartnett, Ariel Donoghue, Saleka Shyamalan, Hayley Mills, Alison Pill	United States	Psychological mystery thriller
Yevam	Prakash Dantuluri	Chandini Chowdary, Vasishta N. Simha, Jai Bharat Raj, Ashu Reddy, Goparaju Ramana, Devi Prasad, Kalpalatha, Baby Annie	India	Crime thriller

== 2025 ==
Title	Director	Cast	Country	Subgenre/notes
Alarum	Michael Polish	Sylvester Stallone, Scott Eastwood, Willa Fitzgerald, Mike Colter, Ísis Valverde, D. W. Moffett	United States	Action crime thriller
The Alto Knights	Barry Levinson	Robert De Niro, Kathrine Narducci, Cosmo Jarvis, Debra Messing	United States	Historical gangster drama
Another Simple Favor	Paul Feig	Anna Kendrick, Blake Lively, Henry Golding, Andrew Rannells, Bashir Salahuddin, Kelly McCormack, Elena Sofia Ricci, Michele Morrone, Elizabeth Perkins, Alex Newell, Taylor Ortega, Allison Janney, Aparna Nancherla	United States	Black comedy crime thriller
Caught Stealing	Darren Aronofsky	Austin Butler, Regina King, Zoë Kravitz, Matt Smith, Liev Schreiber, Vincent D'Onofrio, Griffin Dunne, Bad Bunny, Carol Kane	United States	Sports, biography, crime thriller
Chavín De Huántar: The Rescue of the Century	Diego de León	Rodrigo Sánchez Patiño	Peru	Historical action thriller
Fuze	David Mackenzie	Aaron Taylor-Johnson, Theo James, Sam Worthington, Gugu Mbatha-Raw, Saffron Hocking	United Kingdom	Heist thriller
Honey Don't!	Ethan Coen	Margaret Qualley, Aubrey Plaza, Chris Evans, Charlie Day, Billy Eichner	United States	Detective comedy
Novocaine	Dan Berk, Robert Olsen	Jack Quaid, Amber Midthunder, Ray Nicholson, Jacob Batalon, Betty Gabriel, Matt Walsh	United States	Action crime thriller
Roofman	Derek Cianfrance	Channing Tatum, Kirsten Dunst, Ben Mendelsohn, Peter Dinklage, Uzo Aduba, Juno Temple, Emory Cohen, LaKeith Stanfield	United States	Crime-drama
The Accountant 2	Gavin O'Connor	Ben Affleck, Jon Bernthal, J. K. Simmons, Cynthia Addai-Robinson, Daniella Pineda	United States	Action crime thriller
The Bad Guys 2	Pierre Perifel	Sam Rockwell, Marc Maron, Craig Robinson, Anthony Ramos, Awkwafina, Zazie Beetz, Richard Ayoade, Alex Borstein, Lilly Singh	United States	Animated heist comedy
The Naked Gun	Akiva Schaffer	Liam Neeson, Pamela Anderson, Paul Walter Hauser, Kevin Durand, Danny Huston, Liza Koshy, Cody Rhodes, CCH Pounder, Busta Rhymes	United States	Action crime comedy
The Pickup	Tim Story	Eddie Murphy, Pete Davidson, Keke Palmer, Andrew Dice Clay, Eva Longoria, Ismael Cruz Cordova, Jack Kesy, Marshawn Lynch	United States	Crime comedy
Wake Up Dead Man	Rian Johnson	Daniel Craig, Josh O'Connor, Glenn Close, Josh Brolin, Mila Kunis, Jeremy Renner, Kerry Washington, Andrew Scott, Cailee Spaeny, Daryl McCormack, Thomas Haden Church	United States	Mystery crime comedy

== 2026 ==
Title	Director	Cast	Country	Subgenre/notes
Animal	Ben Affleck	Ben Affleck, Kerry Washington, Gillian Anderson, Adriana Paz with Luis Gerardo Méndez, Steven Yeun	United States	Crime thriller
Crime 101	Bart Layton	Chris Hemsworth, Mark Ruffalo, Barry Keoghan, Halle Berry, Monica Barbaro, Corey Hawkins, Tate Donovan, Devon Bostick, Jennifer Jason Leigh, Nick Nolte	United States	Crime thriller
Dead Man's Wire	Gus Van Sant	Bill Skarsgård, Dacre Montgomery, Colman Domingo, Myha'la Herrold, Cary Elwes, John Robinson, Al Pacino	United States	Historical crime drama thriller
Enola Holmes 3	Philip Barantini	Millie Bobby Brown, Louis Partridge, Himesh Patel, Sharon Duncan-Brewster, Henry Cavill, Helena Bonham Carter	United States	Mystery adventure
Here Comes the Flood	Fernando Meirelles	Denzel Washington, Robert Pattinson, Daisy Edgar-Jones, Danai Gurira, Sean Harris, Moisés Arias, Justin Kirk	United States	Crime drama
How to Rob a Bank	David Leitch	Nicholas Hoult, Zoë Kravitz, Anna Sawai, Pete Davidson, Rhenzy Feliz, Michael Gandolfini, John C. Reilly, Sam Lerner, Cooper Hoffman	United States	Heist
Mike & Nick & Nick & Alice	BenDavid Grabinski	Vince Vaughn, James Marsden, Eiza González, Jimmy Tatro, Keith David, Emily Hampshire, Arturo Castro, Lewis Tan, Ben Schwartz	United States	Sci-Fi, action, crime, comedy
Ray Gunn	Brad Bird	Sam Rockwell, Scarlett Johansson, Tom Waits	United States	Animated science fiction crime
Peaky Blinders: The Immortal Man	Tom Harper	Cillian Murphy, Rebecca Ferguson, Tim Roth, Sophie Rundle, Barry Keoghan, Stephen Graham	United Kingdom	Crime drama
The Gallerist	Cathy Yan	Natalie Portman, Jenna Ortega, Sterling K. Brown, Zach Galifianakis, Da'Vine Joy Randolph, Catherine Zeta-Jones	United States	Dark comedy, crime thriller
The RIP	Joe Carnahan	Matt Damon, Ben Affleck, Steven Yeun, Teyana Taylor, Catalina Sandino Moreno, Sasha Calle, Néstor Carbonell, Lina Esco, Scott Adkins, Kyle Chandler	United States	Action crime thriller
The Rivals of Amziah King	Andrew Patterson	Matthew McConaughey, Angelina LookingGlass, Cole Sprouse, Scott Shepherd, Owen Teague, Rob Morgan, Tony Revolori, Kurt Russell	United States	Crime thriller
The Sheep Detectives	Kyle Balda	Hugh Jackman, Emma Thompson, Nicholas Braun, Nicholas Galitzine, Molly Gordon, Hong Chau, Tosin Cole, Kobna Holdbrook-Smith, Conleth Hill, Mandeep Dhillon	United States	Action mystery comedy
The Whisper Man	James Ashcroft	Robert De Niro, Michelle Monaghan, Adam Scott, Michael Keaton, John Carroll Lynch, Hamish Linklater, Owen Teague	United States	Crime thriller
Unabom	Janus Metzw	Jacob Tremblay, Russell Crowe, Shailene Woodley, Annabelle Wallis, Alexander Ludwig, Steven Ogg, Marc Menchaca	United States	Historical crime drama

== 2027 ==
Title	Director	Cast	Country	Subgenre/notes
4 Kids Walk Into a Bank	Frankie Shaw	Liam Neeson, Talia Ryder, Whitney Peak, Jack Dylan Grazer, Spike Fearn, Teresa Palmer, Jim Sturgess	United States	Heist comedy
Blood on Snow	Cary Joji Fukunaga	Aaron Taylor-Johnson, Benedict Cumberbatch, Eva Green, Emma Laird, Ben Mendelsohn	United States	Crime thriller
F.A.S.T.	Ben Richardson	Brandon Sklenar, Juliana Canfield, LaKeith Stanfield, Jason Clarke, Sam Claflin, Trevante Rhodes, Chloe Coleman	United States	Action crime thriller
Ocean's Prequel	Bradley Cooper	Bradley Cooper, Margot Robbie	United States	Heist comedy
Pendulum	Mark Heyman	Joseph Gordon-Levitt, Phoebe Dynevor, Jackie Weaver, Norman Reedus	United States	Horror mystery thriller
The Thomas Crown Affair	Michael B. Jordan	Michael B. Jordan, Adria Arjona, Lily Gladstone, Danai Gurira, Pilou Asbæk, Ruth Negga, Aubrey Plaza, Kenneth Branagh	United States	Heist romance

== 2028 ==
Title	Director	Cast	Country	Subgenre/notes
Miami Vice '85	Joseph Kosinski	Michael B. Jordan, Austin Butler	United States	Crime
Murder, She Wrote	Jason Moore	Jamie Lee Curtis	United States	Crime comedy, mystery
The Batman: Part II	Matt Reeves	Robert Pattinson, Andy Serkis, Sebastian Stan, Scarlett Johansson, Charles Dance	United States	Superhero, crime thriller

== TBA ==
Title	Director	Cast	Country	Subgenre/notes
Alice + Freda Forever	Jennifer Kent		United States	Psychological crime thriller
American Criminal	Gavin O'Connor		United States	Crime thriller
And Then There Were None	TBA		United States	Psychological thriller, murder mystery
Be My Eyes	Lars Klevberg		United States	Crime thriller
Beverly Hills Cop 5	TBA	Eddie Murphy	United States	Action crime comedy
Blood Runs Coal	TBA	Cillian Murphy	United States	Historical crime biopic
Breaking the Bank	Gareth Evans		United States	Biographical sports, heist
City on Fire	TBA	Austin Butler	United States	Crime drama
Club 33	TBA		United States	Mystery, fantasy
Crime After Crime	TBA	Awkwafina, Ike Barinholtz	United States	Crime comedy
Heat 2	Michael Mann	Christian Bale, Leonardo DiCaprio	United States	Crime drama
Midnight Run 2	TBA	Regina Hall	United States	Action crime comedy
Mind Fall	Mathieu Kassovitz	Daisy Ridley	United States	Sci-fi crime thriller
Mystery Girl	McG	Tiffany Haddish	United States	Action crime drama, mystery thriller
Ocean's 14	David Leitch	George Clooney	United States	Heist comedy
Outside Man	Brian Helgeland	Tommy Lee Jones, Ice Cube	United States	Contemporary Western, crime thriller
Sherlock Holmes 3	Dexter Fletcher	Robert Downey Jr, Jude Law	United States	Action mystery
Small Dark Look	Martin Zandvliet	Jason Statham	United States	Crime thriller
Solitary	TBA	Mahershala Ali	United States	Biographical crime drama
Stakehorse	Justin Lin		United States	Crime thriller
Supermax	David Gordon Green	Will Smith	United States	Action crime thriller
The Accidental Gangster	George Gallo		United States	Biographical crime thriller
The Accountant 3	Gavin O'Connor	Ben Affleck, Jon Bernthal, Anna Kendrick	United States	Action crime thriller
The Batman 3	Matt Reeves	Robert Pattinson	United States	Superhero, crime thriller
The Gangster, The Cop, The Devil	James Wan	Don Lee, Keanu Reeves	United States	Action crime thriller
The Godfather Part 4	TBA		United States	Crime drama
The Ice Beneath Her	Matt Bettinelli-Olpin, Tyler Gillett	Daisy Ridley	United States	Psychological crime thriller
The Pink Panther	Jeff Fowler	Eddie Murphy	United States	Hybrid animation, detective comedy
The Ploughmen	Ed Harris	Bill Murray, Owen Teague, Nick Nolte, Amy Madigan, Lily Harris	United States	Crime thriller
The Saint	Doug Liman	Regé-Jean Page	United States	Action, crime thriller
The Seven Five	Ben Stiller	TBA	United States	Biographical crime thriller
The Wives	TBA	Jennifer Lawrence	United States	Murder mystery
Torso	TBA		United States	Historical crime thriller
Two for the Money	Justin Lin	Daniel Craig, Charlize Theron	United States	Heist thriller
Unsound	Bharat Nalluri	Anna Kendrick	United States	Crime thriller
