= Jeremy M. Rosen =

American film producer and casting director

- Occupations: Film producer and casting director
- Years active: 2011-
- Notable work: King Ivory, Candy Land, Ida Red

Jeremy M. Rosen is an American film producer, entertainment manager, lawyer, and casting director.

== Early life and education ==
Rosen moved to Ludlow, Vermont, at age 13 with his parents and older brother. His father was a medical doctor, while his mother owned a clothing boutique. He loved movies and hip-hop when he was a kid. Upon graduating from college, he worked as a production assistant, making coffee and serving as a talent chaperone.

After a chance meeting with Russell Simmons, whom he idolized, Rosen got an opportunity to work with him while he was in law school. Following graduation, Simmons helped Rosen secure an attorney position at a Park Avenue law firm.

== Career ==
=== Law and entertainment management ===
While working as a lawyer, Rosen realized that he did not want to be a lawyer, which led him back to the entertainment world. According to Rosen, he found a position with a smaller firm that paid less but allowed him to sign his own clients. Many of his clients were based in Los Angeles, and he eventually moved there as well. He was functioning more as an artist manager than a music lawyer, which led him set up Roxwell Management, named after his childhood dog. As lawyer and entertainment manager, Rosen also worked representing clients including Boyz II Men, Aerosmith and Boy George.

=== Film production ===
Rosen got into filmmaking through the acquisition of literary rights. The first book he acquired was Dog Eat Dog by Edward Bunker, which was adapted into a film starring Willem Dafoe and Nicolas Cage. It was released in 2016.

Rosen met filmmaker John Swab during the American Film Market while attending with his first feature film, Paul Schrader's Dog Eat Dog. Following their meeting, Rosen and Swab began developing film projects together in Tulsa, Oklahoma. Their first collaboration was the crime drama Run With the Hunted, starring Ron Perlman. Other projects followed in quick succession, with Swab writing and directing while Rosen handled casting, financing, distribution, production and festivals. These included Body Brokers, starring the late Michael K. Williams in his final role, Ida Red with Josh Hartnett, Candy Land, Little Dixie, One Day as a Lion and King Ivory, bringing the total to seven projects in five years.

Rosen was a music supervisor on Body Brokers. One Day as a Lion was Rosen and Swab's fourth collaboration with actor Frank Grillo.

=== Casting work ===
Rosen has been profiled as a producer who also serves as his own casting director for his projects. According to Rosen, his involvement in casting began while producing Charlie Says. He participated in casting sessions and offered ideas while interacting with actors, agents and managers. Later, while making films with John Swab, casting became his favorite part of the process.

His casting decisions have been said to rely on a list of actors he admires, long-standing relationships and mutual trust.

== Filmography ==
Year	Title	Role	Notes
2011	Platinum Hit	Executive producer	TV series (10 episodes)
2016	Dog Eat Dog	Executive producer	
2018	Charlie Says	Producer	
2019	Run with the Hunted	Producer; Casting director; Music supervisor	
2020	I Am Fear	Producer; Music supervisor	
2021	Body Brokers	Producer; Casting director; Music supervisor	
2021	Ida Red	Producer; Casting director; Music supervisor	
2022	Unplugging	Executive producer	
2022	Candy Land	Producer; Casting director; Music supervisor	
2023	Little Dixie	Producer; Casting director; Music supervisor	
2023	One Day as a Lion	Producer; Casting director; Music supervisor	
2024	King Ivory	Producer; Casting director; Music supervisor	

== Business ventures ==
In 2026, Rosen was announced as one of the co-founder of a music and technology company Artist Included, alongside entrepreneur Paul "PK" Kemsley and Boy George as the company's creative director. The company launched with Boy George's AI-assisted rerecording of "Karma Chameleon".
