= Run with the Hunted =

Run with the Hunted may refer to:

- Run with the Hunted, a 2007 album by Skyhill
  - "Run with the Hunted", a song on the album
- Run with the Hunted (film), a 2019 American film starring Michael Pitt
