= A World with No Skies =

A World With No Skies

Studio album by Slaine
- Released: August 16, 2011
- Genre: Hip hop
- Label: Suburban Noize Records
- Producers: Eric Lowe (exec.); Slaine (exec.); Louis Bell; DJ Lethal; DMatic; Matty Trump; DC the Midi Alien

Singles from A World With No Skies
- 1. "99 Bottles" Released: September 28, 2010

Professional ratings
Review scores
Source	Rating
AllMusic	3.5/5 stars
HipHopDX	4/5
RapReviews	8/10

A World With No Skies is a debut album by American rapper Slaine. The album was originally scheduled for release on October 26, 2010, and copies were actually pressed and ready for distribution when Slaine and Surburban Noize chose to hold back and substantially rework the album due to sample clearance issues. To make up for the delay, Slaine released his mixtape The Devil Never Dies at the same time the album had been expected to hit shelves.

The original version of the album leaked after Nokia Digital accidentally released a digital version for sale on the planned October 26 release date. Therefore, the album was set to be released in February 2011 but was later pushed back again to an unknown date. Slaine later confirmed that the album will be released on August 16, 2011 and will be known as "A World with No Skies 2.0". Slaine has stated that roughly half of the tracks on the CD are the same as the original track list.

Three tracks from the original version were legitimately released in 2010: the first single, "99 Bottles" (which also appeared on the soundtrack for the movie The Town), "Mistaken Identity", which appeared on the La Coka Nostra mixtape The Audacity of Coke, and "Crillionaires", which circulated on the artists' Myspace pages.

== Track listing ==
=== Original version ===
#	Title	Producer	Featuring
1	"A World with No Skies"	Lü Balz	
2	"Voices of Apocalypse"	DJ Lethal	
3	"99 Bottles"	DMatic	
4	"When I Shoot You"	Lü Balz	
5	"Black Horses"	Lü Balz	
6	"Night After Night"	Lü Balz	
7	"Crillionaires"	Q-Unique	Ill Bill, Q-Unique
8	"The American Way"	Statik Selektah	
9	"Landscapes"	Hirolla	Reef the Lost Cauze, Vinnie Paz
10	"Mistaken Identity"	Statik Selektah	
11	"Broken"	Matty Trump	V-Nuxx, Cyrus DeShield
12	"Till the Day That We Die"	Chum	
13	"Crazy"	DC the Midi Alien	B-Real, Jaysaun
14	"I Ain't Done"	Lü Balz	
15	"Insomnia"	Lü Balz	
16	"Body of Christ"	Sicknature	
17	"Ghosts"	DJ Lethal	
18	"The Last Song"	Lü Balz	Everlast

=== "2.0" ===
#	Title	Producer	Featuring
1	"Black Horses"	Lü Balz	
2	"Voices of Apocalypse"	DJ Lethal	
3	"99 Bottles"	DMatic	
4	"When I Shoot You"	Lü Balz	
5	"Zombie"	Richie Kennon	Son of Skam
6	"Can't Go Home"	DJ Waxwork	
7	"YOU"	Silvamore	
8	"Jumpin' Out the Window"	Lü Balz	Cyrus DeShield, Edo G
9	"Crazy"	DC the Midi Alien	B-Real, Jaysaun
10	"I Ain't Done"	Lü Ballz	
11	"The Boulevard"	Silvamore, Lü Balz	Sean Price, Blacastan, Ill Bill
12	"Broken"	Matty Trump	V-Nuxx, Cyrus DeShield
13	"Ghosts"	DJ Lethal	
14	"Where My Heart Is"	Silvamore, Lü Balz	Cyrus DeShield
15	"Borrowed Time"	Lü Balz	CheckMark (of Skitzofreniks), Lu Balz
16	"The Last Song"	Lü Balz	Everlast

== Charts ==
Chart (2011)	Peak position
US Top R&B/Hip-Hop Albums (Billboard)	33
US Top Rap Albums (Billboard)	22
US Independent Albums (Billboard)	29
US Heatseekers Albums (Billboard)	4
