= Swab =

Swab may refer to:

- Nasopharyngeal swab
- Buccal swab
- Cotton swab
- A nautical term for a yarn mop
  - By extension, a low-ranking sailor
- John Swab (born 1988), American film director, writer, producer
