= Ida Red (disambiguation) =

Ida Red may refer to:

- Ida Red (film), American action crime thriller film
- "Ida Red" (song), American traditional song
