= Slaine (rapper) =

American rapper

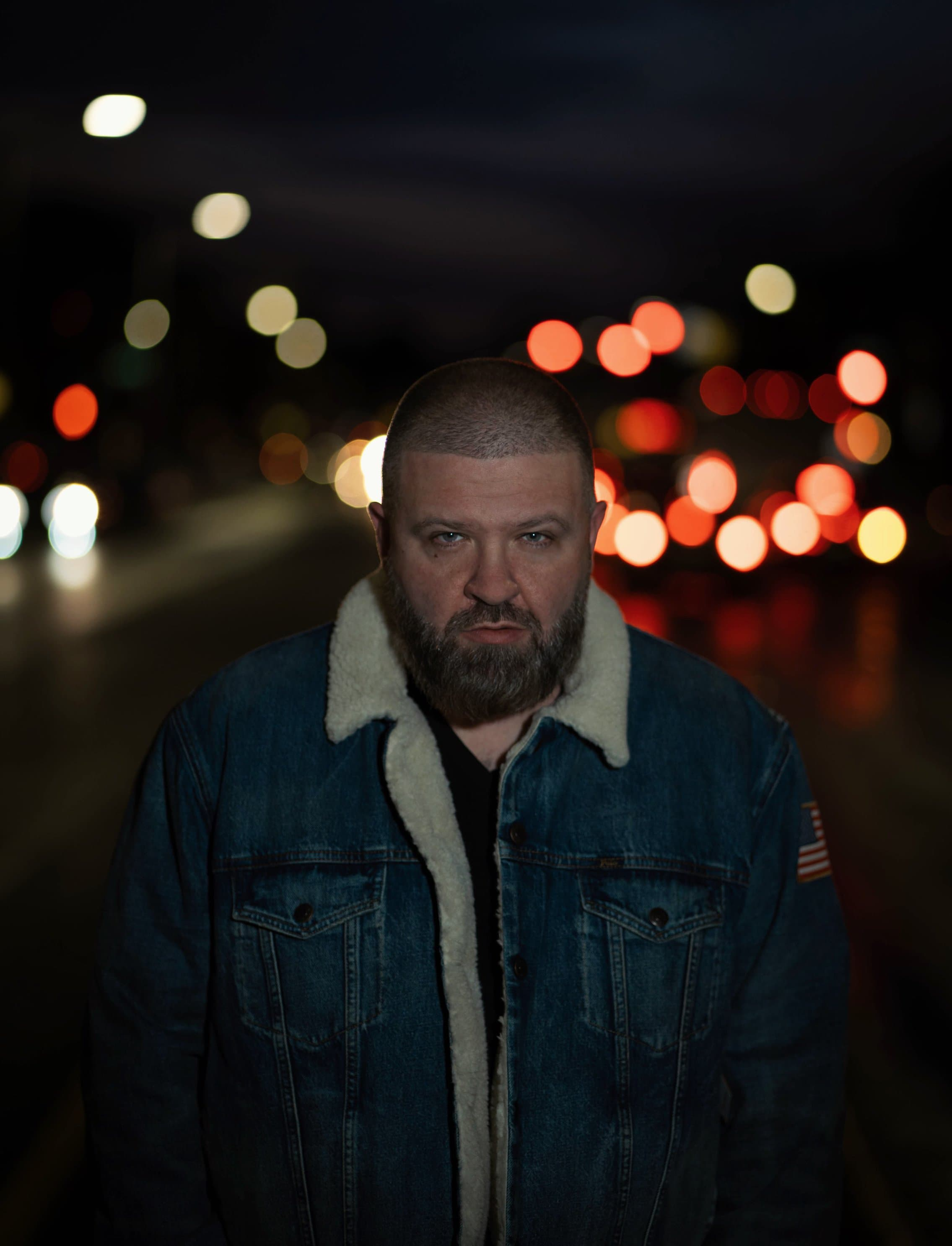
- Slaine in 2022

Background information
- Born: George Carroll; September 27, 1977 (age 48); Boston, Massachusetts, U.S.
- Genres: Hip hop
- Years active: 2001–present
- Labels: Suburban Noize Records, Leedz Edutainment, Commonwealth Records, Duck Down Records
- Member of: Special Teamz; La Coka Nostra
- Website: Official Facebook

George Carroll (born September 27, 1977), better known as Slaine, is an American rapper and actor. Born in Boston, Massachusetts, where he spent his childhood and teenage years, Carroll moved to New York City in the mid-1990s, where he adopted the moniker of Slaine and started to rap and record hip-hop. In the early 2000s, Carroll became a growing figure in the Boston hip-hop scene, releasing several mixtapes and the LP Stereotypez (2007) with his group Special Teamz. Later, A Brand You Can Trust (2009) was released, by the rap supergroup La Coka Nostra, where Carroll is joined by Ill Bill and House of Pain. Carroll’s first solo album A World With No Skies 2.0. (2011) peaked at 33 on the Top R&B/Hip-Hop Albums it, 22 on the Top Rap Albums, 29 on US Independent Albums, and 4 on Top Heatseekers.

Carroll’s subsequent albums with La Coka Nostra were Masters of the Dark Arts (2012) and To Thine Own Self Be True (2016). On his own he followed up with The Boston Project (2013), The King of Everything Else (2014), Anti-Hero (2017), One Day (2019), and The Things We Can't Forgive (2021).

While rising on the hip-hop scene, Carroll became an actor. For Ben Affleck's directorial film debut, Gone Baby Gone (2007), he thought Carroll had the right look for a part and auditioned him successfully. However before Carroll was completely onboard, Affleck had to do some additional convincing, since the producers were reluctant to hire a first time actor. A few years later, Affleck rehired Carroll for the movie The Town (2010). Together with the rest of the cast, they won Best ensemble cast at the 2010 National Board of Review and the Washington DC Area Film Critics Association Awards. Carroll continued acting in motion pictures with roles in Killing Them Softly (2012), Girl House (2014), Central Intelligence (2016), Wheelman (2017), etc.

== Early life ==
George Carroll was born in Boston, Massachusetts. His family often moved between the neighborhoods of South Boston, Dorchester, and Roslindale. He started writing rap lyrics in 1986, being influenced by the Beastie Boys, LL Cool J, and Kool Moe Dee. However, his first goal was to become a filmmaker. Carroll said that he moved to New York City in 1996. During this time he studied film at the School of Visual Arts in Manhattan, but was let go after getting into an altercation with a staff member. Carroll turned his direction toward hip-hop performing his raps at open-mike sessions and street corners. Eventually while recording a demo in the studio of the rap group Lordz of Brooklyn, Carroll said that member Kaves nicknamed him Slaine after an Irish comic book character. Afterward, Carroll lived between Boston and New York.

== Career ==
=== 2004 to 2011: rise to prominence and breakthrough ===
In late 2004, the creation of the rap supergroup La Coka Nostra started when hip-hop artist Danny Boy O'Connor was mentoring two up and coming artists which included Carroll. O'Connor brought them to meet his former DJ Leor Diamant (DJ Lethal) from his previous group House of Pain. They decided to make a group, however O'Connor felt that there was a void and asked experienced rapper William Braunstein (Ill Bill) to join. The group's name came about, when O'Connor teased other members after they had a night out. The group started releasing music on MySpace, and went viral. Eventually, another former House of Pain member Erik Schrody (Everlast) showed interest to join the group. By 2006, the group consisted of O'Connor, Carroll, Diamant, Braunstein, and Schrody (who left some time after the first album was released).

During this time, Carroll was getting noticed as a talented rapper in the Boston underground hip-hop scene. He was part of a group named Special Teamz alongside artists Jaysaun and Ed O.G. In a 2005 Boston Globe article, he is described as “one of the city’s most talented hip-hop artist, who exudes mass appeal”.

In 2005, he released the mixtape The White Man Is the Devil, Vol. 1.

In 2007, Carroll had his first acting role in Ben Affleck's Gone Baby Gone. Reading a newspaper article about his music triggered Affleck's initial interest in casting him. At 9 am the next day, Affleck started to phone Carroll, who had gone to bed two hours earlier and missed all his calls. Carroll said "My picture was in the Boston Herald talking about what I was doing with my music. I woke up one afternoon, and I had 66 missed phone calls. They called me in to do an audition -- turned out I had to do five auditions." Originally Carroll was sought after for the role of Cheese, but Affleck changed his mind and wanted him for the bigger part of the gangster Bubba Rogowski. Carroll explained "I thought I wasn't going to get (the role) because they took so long to get back to me, but it turns out Ben was just convincing the studio to take a chance on me despite my lack of acting experience. I was in L.A. recording with La Coka Nostra when I got the call and was obviously ecstatic." Affleck explained his reasoning by saying “it’s really great to hire people with whom an audience isn’t overly familiar, because audiences have developed expectations and kind of anticipate what an actor might do if they’ve seen them a bunch". Released on October 19, 2007, the film grossed $20.3 million in the U.S. and Canada and $14.3 million in other territories, for a worldwide total of $34.6 million against its $19 million budget.

Also that year, Carroll with Special Teamz released the album Stereotypez.

In 2009, La Coka Nostra released A Brand You Can Trust was released on July 14, 2009, on Suburban Noize Records. It sold over 500,000 units. AllMusic gave four out of five stars. Andrew Kameka of HipHopDX wrote that "the album is a mostly solid effort and exactly what someone would expect from a supergroup of like-minded members known for high-energy music". Adam Kennedy of the BBC while praising some the moments of the album said "it’s a tantalising parting taste of potential capabilities". Steve Juon of RapReviews gave it a seven out of ten saying "there's definitely brutal beauty in the worlds that have collided on La Coka Nostra's "A Brand You Can Trust"". Thomas Quinlan of Exclaim! said "La Coka Nostra are an interesting collection of collaborators that live up to the hype".

In 2010, Carroll reunited with director Affleck for the film The Town. The film is about a gang of bank robbers which includes Carroll, Affleck, Jeremy Renner, and Owen Burke. For their performances they won Best ensemble cast at the 2010 National Board of Review, and Washington DC Area Film Critics Association Awards. The film took #1 at the box office during its opening weekend, taking in $23.8 million. The Town grossed $92.1 million in the United States and Canada with an additional $61.8 million in other territories for a total of $154 million worldwide on a production budget of $37 million.

In 2011, Carroll released his first solo album A World With No Skies 2.0. The addition of the "2.0" is due to the fact that an earlier version of the album had been leaked online. On the Top R&B/Hip-Hop Albums it peaked at 33, on Top Rap Albums at 22, on US Independent Albums at 29, and on Top Heatseekers at 4. David Jeffries of AllMusic gave it three and a half stars out of five, saying ''this is a solid outing from the Irish-American MC''. Steve Juon of Rapreviews gave it eight out of ten and said "It's that self-effacing humor and penchant for punchlines that keep Slaine's album from going so dark". Luke Gibson of HipHopDX gave it four out of five stars, praised it to be Carroll best lyrical effort to date, and said ''a national album that portrays him as more than just Boston’s boy, but a voice that resonates with struggle, perseverance and the tender balance between good and evil everywhere''. For his music accomplishments, Carroll won "Hip Hop Artist Of The Year" at the Boston Music Awards.

That same year on television, on 11 February, Carroll acted in Razer the ninth instalment of the first season of The Cape. On 4 October, he played a part in Missing an episode of Body of Proof.

=== 2012 to present day: subsequent success ===
In 2012, La Coka Nostra released their second album, Masters of the Dark Arts. It reached 176 on Billboard Top Current Albums, 40 on Independent Albums, and 31 on Top R&B/Hip-Hop Albums. Adam Fleischer of XXL magazine noted that "La Coka Nostra remain decidedly true to their core with their new album" and "that they are indeed masters of the dark arts". HipHopDX gave the album a positive review and noted that the album was a "sinister, happily violent detour from the pop-centric". Peter Marrack of Exclaim! also gave the album a positive review and noted that the album was "more or less a one-way ticket to hell". Nathan G. O'Brien of Scene Point Blank gave it four out five star and said "with Master of the Dark Arts La Coka Nostra’s pluperfect union of bombastic boom-bap, record scratching, and realism-based hardcore rhyming". Also that year, Carroll acted in Andrew Dominik's Killing Them Softly.

In 2013, Carroll released his second solo album The Boston Project. Where all the songs have featured guest from the Boston hip hop local scenes, including the likes of Esoteric, Ed O.G., Millyz, etc. Of this record Carroll explained his intent: “I wanted to create a record that highlights what this city has to offer musically and show how diverse the talent is. This record embodies something much larger than just a Slaine record.” On the Top Rap Albums it peaked at the Top R&B/Hip-Hop Albums it peaked at 40, and on Top Heatseekers at 10. Matt Jost of Rapreview gave it a seven point five out of ten saying: "Slaine makes for a formidable tour guide, relying on his own experience but also knowing that, as he puts it at one point, “I speak for more of us.”" Andres Tardio of HipHopDx gave it three point five stars out of five and stated that. "The Boston Project is a solid album with versatility that does what Slaine set out to do: represent Boston Hip Hop in a positive light." Martìn Cabellero of The Boston Globe liked the album calling it ambitious and a strong showing of his talent.

In 2014, Carroll released his third album The King of Everything Else. On the Billboard 200 it peaked at 189, Top R&B/Hip-Hop Albums at 26, on Top Rap Albums at 15, on US Independent Albums at 30, and on Top Heatseekers at 4.

Acting credits for that year are the gangster film By the Gun, and Trevor Matthews's horror film Girl House, where he plays the main antagonist. The second is described as a good slasher film with good performances. Mike Wilson of Bloody Disgusting said "Slaine hits the right notes when it comes to expressions and emotions, while evoking a bit of sympathy for the sob". Scott Hallam of Dread Central praised Carroll "one of the true strengths of the film is Slaine’s portrayal of the killer, Loverboy".

In 2016, La Coka Nostra released To Thine Own Self Be True. The album reached 38 on the Billboard Top R&B/Hip-Hop Albums. Steve Juon of RapReviews gave eight point five out of ten and wrote "for a blissful 45 minutes it's an uncut dose of that nostalgia straight through the ear canals to the dopamine centers of my brain". Also that year, Carroll acted in Rawson Marshall Thurber's Central Intelligence, John Swab's Let Me Make You a Martyr, and Dead Draw.

In 2017, Carroll and rapper Termanology, as a duo called Slaine Vs Termanology, released the album Anti-Hero.

Also. that year, he was in the Netflix movie Wheelman.

In 2019, he acted in John Swab's Run with the Hunted. That year he also released the album One Day.

In 2021, Carroll acted in the suspense film Ida Red by John Swab. That year he also released the album The Things We Can't Forgive.

In 2022, Carroll acted in It Snows All the Time.

In 2023, Carroll acted in two John Swab's films Little Dixie, and One Day as Lion.

== Personal life ==
Carroll is a father with one son.

In 2022, in addition to his music and acting career, Carroll opened up Charles River Recovery with a group of professionals whose mission is to give treatment to people who suffer from addiction. Carroll found sobriety in March 2014 after a long battle with alcoholism and addiction and became increasingly involved in helping others after losing his best friend to an overdose. Charles River Recovery is a 110-bed in-patient medical detox and clinical stabilization facility in the Boston area.

== Filmography ==
- Gone Baby Gone (2007)
- The Town (2010)
- Killing Them Softly (2012)
- By the Gun (2014)
- Girl House (2014)
- Central Intelligence (2016)
- Let Me Make You a Martyr (2016)
- Dead Draw (2016)
- Wheelman (2017)
- Run with the Hunted (2019)
- Ida Red (2021)
- It Snows All the Time (2022)
- Little Dixie (2023)
- One Day as a Lion (2023)
- Rule of Thirds (2024)
- King Ivory (2024)
- Joker: Folie à Deux (2024)
- Long Gone Heroes (2024)
- The Running Man (2025)

== Accolades ==
- 2010 - Winner - Best Ensemble - shared with the rest of the cast of The Town - National Board of Review
- 2010 - Winner - Best Ensemble - shared with the rest of the cast of The Town - Washington DC Area Film Critics Association Awards
- 2011 - Winner - "Hip Hop Artist Of The Year" - Boston Music Awards
