= Candy Land (film) =

- Directed by: John Swab
- Produced by: John Swab; Jeremy M. Rosen
- Starring: Olivia Luccardi; Sam Quartin; Eden Brolin; Owen Campbell; Virginia Rand; William Baldwin
- Cinematography: Will Stone
- Edited by: John David Allen; Andrew Aaronson
- Music by: David Sardy
- Production company: Roxwell Films
- Distributed by: Quiver Distribution
- Release dates: August 9, 2022 (Locarno); January 6, 2023 (United States)
- Running time: 93 minutes
- Country: United States
- Language: English

Candy Land is a 2022 American horror thriller film written and directed by John Swab and starring Olivia Luccardi, Sam Quartin, Eden Brolin, Owen Campbell, Virginia Rand and William Baldwin.

== Plot ==
A seemingly naive and devout young woman navigates her way through the underground world of truck stop sex workers known as "lot lizards".

== Cast ==
- Eden Brolin as Riley
- William Baldwin as Sheriff Rex
- Olivia Luccardi as Remy
- Owen Campbell as Levi
- Guinevere Turner as Nora
- Sam Quartin as Sadie
- Virginia Rand as Liv

== Release ==
The film premiered at the Locarno Film Festival in August 2022. It was also screened at the New York City Horror Film Festival on December 1, 2022. In November 2022, it was announced that Quiver Distribution acquired North American distribution rights to the film, which was released in theaters and on demand on January 6, 2023.

== Reception ==
The film has a 77% rating on Rotten Tomatoes based on 22 reviews. Meagan Navarro of Bloody Disgusting awarded the film three and a half skulls out of five. Mary Beth McAndrews of Dread Central awarded the film four and a half stars out of five. Christian Zilko of IndieWire graded the film a B+. Michael Talbot-Haynes of Film Threat rated the film a 9.5 out of 10.

Noel Murray of the Los Angeles Times gave the film a positive review and wrote, "It’s possible Swab made this film just to tell a story about the more compassionate side of prostitution. If so, the movie’s guilty-pleasure thrills are just a bonus."

Jon Mendelsohn of Comic Book Resources also gave the film a positive review and wrote, "Candy Land succeeds at juggling multiple genres at once, resulting in a memorable, layered, and bloody slow-burn of a horror flick."

Beatrice Loayza of The New York Times also gave the film a positive review and wrote, "Candy Land is standard grindhouse fare(...)though not without its fair share of pleasurable nastiness."
