= Niko Nicotera =

German-born American actor

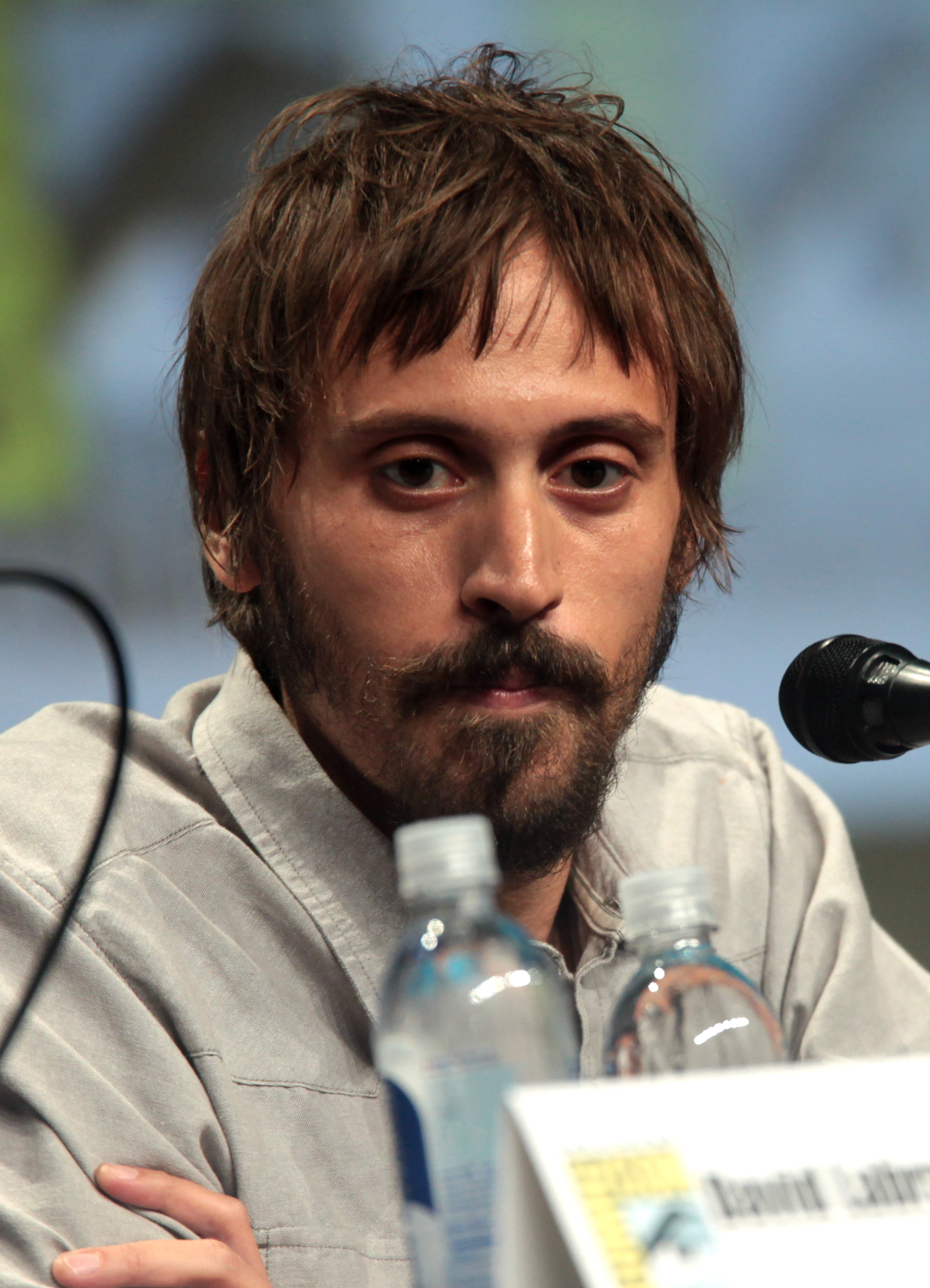
- Nicotera at the 2014 Comic-Con International
- Born: April 6, 1979 (age 47); Giessen, Hesse, West Germany
- Occupation: Actor
- Years active: 2001–present

Niko Nicotera is an American actor best known for playing George "Ratboy" Skogstrom in the television series Sons of Anarchy (2011–2014).

== Early life and education ==
Niko was born in Giessen, Germany, on an American military base, and traveled with his family to Italy and London after leaving Germany. While in London he studied classical theater at The Academy of Live and Recorded Arts.

== Career ==
He has done work on both British and American television.

== Personal life ==
He currently lives in Los Angeles, California.

== Filmography ==
=== Film ===
Year	Title	Role	Notes
2001	Love's Crazy	Niko	Short
2004	La Femme Musketeer	Étienne	
2006	Plastic	Matt	Short
2008	Agent Crush	Pilot	
2008	The Monument	Nelson	Short
2010	Sympathy for Delicious	Rasha	
2011	I Melt With You	Bartender	
2011	Some Guy Who Kills People	Lyle Bagwell	
2012	California Solo	Nick	
2013	Saving Lincoln	Captain Holmes	
2014	The Purge: Anarchy	Roddy	
2015	Secret in Their Eyes	Hammer / Chop Shop Thug	
2016	Let Me Make You a Martyr	Drew Glass	
2017	Sun Dogs	Lyle	
2019	Richard Jewell	Dave Dutchess	
2022	Father Stu	Barfly	
2026	The Odyssey	Peisander	

=== Television ===
Year	Title	Role	Notes
2001	As If	Serge	1 episode
2004	Mile High	Dieter	1 episode
2004	The Lady Musketeer	Etienne	TV movie
2005	Icon	Andrei Kasanov	TV movie
2006	The Curse of King Tut's Tomb	Andrew Walker	TV movie
2006	Blackbeard	Moses Hobbs	TV movie
2007	Rome	Messenger	1 episode
2011	True Blood	Dealer	1 Episode
2012	The Mentalist	Skiddy	1 Episode
2012	CSI: NY	Joseph Skiver	1 Episode
2013	Castle	Ziff Falgrad	1 episode
2014	CSI: Crime Scene Investigation	Doug Adamson	1 episode
2014	Turn: Washington's Spies	Eben	1 episode
2011–2014	Sons of Anarchy	George 'Ratboy' Skogstrom	36 episodes
2015	Gotham	Derek Delaware	1 episode
2017	You’re The Worst	Jeff	Recurring
2017	Criminal Minds	John Malone	Episode: "Hell's Kitchen"
2018	NCIS	Albert 'Vicious' Leary	Episode: "What Child Is This?"
2018–2019	The Rookie	Carson Miller	2 episodes
2019	The Orville	Rokal	Episode: "All the World Is Birthday Cake"
2020	Stumptown	Kale Murphy	Episode: "All Hands on Dex"
2021	Good Girls	Gene	Recurring
2024	Matlock	Joey [Alfie's father]	Recurring
