= Let Me Make You a Martyr =

- Film poster
- Directed by: Corey Asraf; John Swab
- Written by: John Swab
- Story by: Corey Asraf
- Produced by: Corey Asraf; Mark Boone Junior; Marilyn Manson; Sam Quartin; John Swab; Michael Jefferson
- Starring: Marilyn Manson; Mark Boone Junior; Sam Quartin; Niko Nicotera; Michael Potts; Slaine
- Cinematography: Jeff Melanson
- Edited by: Dylan Quirt; Corey Asraf
- Music by: Gingger Shankar
- Production companies: Iscariot Films; Actium Pictures; Coreyworks
- Distributed by: FilmRise
- Release dates: July 22, 2016 (Fantasia); May 25, 2017 (United States)
- Running time: 102 minutes
- Country: United States
- Language: English

Let Me Make You a Martyr is a 2016 American action crime drama film written, directed and co-produced by Corey Asraf and John Swab, and starring Marilyn Manson, Mark Boone Junior, Niko Nicotera, Michael Potts, Sam Quartin, Slaine and Danny Boy.

== Synopsis ==
Drew Glass has recently returned to his hometown after years away, crossing paths with his adoptive father, local crime boss Larry Glass, and reconnecting with his adopted sister and love interest, June Glass. Determined to run away together and escape their complicated past, June and Drew concoct a plan to kill Larry. Unfortunately, Larry finds out about the scheme and hires a hit man of his own to resolve the problem.

== Cast ==
- Marilyn Manson as Pope
- Niko Nicotera as Drew Glass
- Mark Boone Junior as Larry Glass
- Sam Quartin as June Glass
- Michael Potts as Charon
- William Lee Scott as Jamie
- George Carroll as Hondo
- Michael Shamus Wiles as Father Francis
- Rebekah Kennedy as Libby
- Jake Silbermann as Lamen
- Daniel Martin Berkey as Uncle Marvin
- Gore Abrams as Brown
- John Swab as Leroy
- Gracie Grenier as Rooney
- Magen Mattox as Seven
- Bruce Davis as Ronin
- Michael Jefferson as Lonnie
- Edrick Browne as Darnell
- Rat King as Chastity
- Lisa Catara as Trisha Shelton
- Debbi Tucker as Sister Mary Margaret
- Daniel O’Connor as Willie
- Brett Swab as Chett Larry
- Mc Scab as Gardener

== Production ==
Filming took place in the spring of 2015 in Oklahoma, including Tulsa, Sand Springs, and Claremore.
