= Beau Knapp =

American actor (born 1989)

- Born: Beau Christian Knapp; April 17, 1989 (age 37); Los Angeles, California, U.S.
- Occupation: Actor
- Years active: 2009–present

Beau Christian Knapp (born April 17, 1989) is an American actor. He is known for his roles in The Signal (2014), Southpaw (2015), Seven Seconds (2018) and Death Wish (2018). In 2021, he starred in the TV series adaptation of The Lost Symbol.

== Early life ==
Knapp was born in Los Angeles County, California.

== Career ==
In 2011, Knapp made his film debut as Breen in the science-fiction adventure film Super 8. He played Denny in the horror thriller film No One Lives (2012). On television, Knapp appeared in a 2013 episode of the television series Bones.

Other film roles include the character Jonah Breck in the science fiction thriller The Signal (2014), Jackson in the drama You're Not You (2014), Kenan Boyle in the crime thriller Run All Night (2015), and Jon Jon in the boxing drama Southpaw (2015).

In 2016, Knapp played the best friend of Chris Pine's character in the disaster drama film The Finest Hours. He then played the villain Blue Face in the mystery thriller The Nice Guys, as well as violent Crack in the war film Billy Lynn's Long Halftime Walk.

Knapp appeared in the Netflix war drama film Sand Castle (2017), and in a co-starring role in the Netflix series Seven Seconds (2018).

Knapp appeared as the main villain, opposite Bruce Willis, in Eli Roth's remake of Death Wish. He also played the main antagonist in Measure of a Man. In 2024, Knapp portrayed Drew Franklin in season 7 of SEAL Team. In 2025, Knapp had a major role in season three of Tulsa King on Paramount.

== Filmography ==
=== Film ===
Key
†	Denotes films that have not yet been released

Year	Title	Role
2011	Super 8	Breen
2012	No One Lives	Denny
2014	The Signal	Jonah
2014	You're Not You	Jackson
2015	Run All Night	Kenan Boyle
2015	What Lola Wants	Marlo
2015	Southpaw	"Jon-Jon"
2015	The Gift	Detective Walker
2016	The Finest Hours	Mel Gouthro
2016	Vincent N Roxxy	Daryl
2016	The Nice Guys	"Blueface"
2016	Billy Lynn's Long Halftime Walk	"Crack"
2017	Sand Castle	Sergeant Burton
2017	My Days of Mercy	Toby
2018	Death Wish	Knox
2018	Measure of a Man	Willie Rumson
2018	Destroyer	Jason "Jay" Bird
2019	Crypto	Martin Duran
2019	Semper Fi	"Milk" Milkowski
2019	American Skin	Officer Mike Randall
2019	Black and Blue	"Smitty"
2021	Ida Red	Jay
2021	Mosquito State	Richard Boca
2021	The Guilty	Dru Nashe (voice)
2023	Little Dixie	Raphael "Cuco" Prado
2023	The Bikeriders	Wahoo
2024	Road House	Vince
2024	Long Gone Heroes	West
2026	Ghost Soldier	Mirko

=== Television ===
Year	Title	Role	Notes
2013	Bones	Zane Reynolds	Episode: "The Secret in the Siege"
2015	Edge: The Loner	Little Bill	TV movie
2017	Shots Fired	Deputy Caleb Brooks	9 episodes
2018	Seven Seconds	Peter Jablonski	10 episodes
2020	The Good Lord Bird	Owen Brown	7 episodes
2020	L.A.'s Finest	Malcolm Ward	6 episodes
2021	The Lost Symbol	Mal'akh	10 episodes
2022	Law & Order: Organized Crime	Mark Sirenko	Episode: "Gimme Shelter Part 1"
2022	Law & Order: Special Victims Unit	Mark Sirenko	Episode: "Gimme Shelter Part 2"
2022	Law & Order	Mark Sirenko	Episode: "Gimme Shelter Part 3"
2024	SEAL Team	Drew Franklin	10 episodes
2024–2025	FBI: International	Greg Csonka	6 episodes
2025	Tulsa King	Cole Dunmire	10 episodes
2026	Marshals	Eric Savard	Episode: "Under the Influence"
