= Long Gone Heroes =

- Theatrical release poster
- Directed by: John Swab
- Screenplay by: John Swab
- Story by: Santiago Manes Moreno
- Produced by: Cristina Villar Rosa; Scott Putman; Charlie Toro; Carlos Velázquez
- Starring: Frank Grillo; Josh Hutcherson; Eden Brolin; Melissa Leo; Andy García
- Cinematography: Brandon Lee Cox
- Edited by: Andrew Aaronson; Kevin Hale
- Music by: David Sardy
- Production companies: Phoenix Media & Entertainment
- Distributed by: Lionsgate; Grindstone Entertainment Group
- Release date: September 20, 2024
- Running time: 92 minutes
- Country: United States
- Language: English

Long Gone Heroes is a 2024 American action thriller film written and directed by John Swab, based on a story by Santiago Manes Moreno. It stars Frank Grillo, Josh Hutcherson, Mekhi Phifer, Eden Brolin, Beau Knapp, George Carroll, Wendy Moniz, Melissa Leo, and Andy García. In the film, an ex-soldier assembles a team of mercenaries to rescue his niece after she is kidnapped by a drug lord in Venezuela.

== Cast ==
- Frank Grillo as Gunner
- Josh Hutcherson as David
- Mekhi Phifer as Moreau
- Eden Brolin as Julia Peterson
- Beau Knapp as West
- George Carroll as Matty
- Wendy Moniz as Mace Spencer
- Melissa Leo as Senator Olivia Peterson
- Andy García as Roman
- Juan Pablo Raba as Guapo

== Plot ==
Political journalist Julia Peterson travels to Venezuela to investigate the country's economic crisis and its connections to American political and corporate interests. During an interview with whistleblower Fede Torres, Julia learns of an illicit arrangement involving Keystone Oil, a private American oil company, and a military contracting operation overseen by General Roman and his associate Moreau. The evidence also implicates Julia's mother, U.S. Senator Olivia Peterson, who is a major shareholder in Keystone Oil.

After Julia obtains evidence of the operation, she is abducted and held at a remote black site in Venezuela. Olivia approaches her estranged brother-in-law, Gunner, a former Special Forces operative and Julia's uncle, and asks him to rescue her. Gunner initially lives an isolated life following his departure from military service, but agrees to undertake the mission. He recruits two of his former teammates, Matty and West. Because they require someone capable of handling communications and satellite technology, they also recruit David, the son of another former member of their unit.

After entering Venezuela, the group meets Gunner's former comrade Guapo, who serves as their local contact. Guapo informs them that Julia is being held at a Keystone-controlled black site and that Moreau has been eliminating individuals connected to the conspiracy. Gunner's team infiltrates the compound, with West providing sniper support while the others enter the facility. They locate Julia along with a group of detained Venezuelan migrants.

Although Gunner intends to extract Julia immediately, she refuses to leave the other prisoners behind. The team consequently frees the entire group and travels with them through the jungle. During their escape, Moreau discovers evidence indicating that Gunner is responsible for the attack on the compound. Gunner and Moreau share a violent history from their military service in Kandahar, where Gunner's opposition to Moreau's actions ultimately resulted in Gunner being shot and forced out of service.

Julia discovers that the incriminating video she obtained has been deleted from her phone. David manages to recover the footage from cloud storage, restoring evidence connecting Roman, Moreau, and Olivia to the operation. After helping the rescued migrants reach safety, the team is assisted by Luis, a former soldier who offers to transport them toward Caracas, where they can escape Venezuela by boat.

The group takes shelter at a brothel owned by Luis's family. Their location is attacked by Roman and Moreau's forces, resulting in Luis's death. During the assault, Matty is separated from the others and captured. Roman and Moreau interrogate him in an attempt to discover the team's extraction point, but Matty refuses to cooperate and is killed.

As the surviving group makes its way through Caracas, Gunner separates from them and instructs Guapo to lead Julia, David, and West toward the harbor. Gunner instead draws Moreau away from the others and confronts him inside a church. Their confrontation becomes a brutal hand-to-hand fight in which Gunner ultimately kills Moreau.

Meanwhile, Julia, David, West, and Guapo encounter Roman and his men while attempting to reach the harbor. A firefight follows. Guapo, already wounded, remains behind while the others continue toward their extraction point. David shoots and wounds Roman but is himself shot during the confrontation. Julia then confronts Roman and kills him.

Gunner rejoins the group and finds the mortally wounded Guapo, who chooses to remain in Venezuela. After saying goodbye to his former friend, Gunner reaches the harbor and escapes Venezuela with Julia, West, and David.

Following their return to the United States, Julia must decide what to do with the evidence implicating her mother. Rather than immediately releasing it herself, she gives Olivia an opportunity to publicly acknowledge her involvement. Olivia accepts responsibility for her actions, announces her resignation from the United States Senate, and agrees to face the resulting investigation and potential legal consequences.

== Reception ==
Robert Daniels of The New York Times called it "A tactical and efficient film", describing it as "a throwback to Commando" starring Arnold Schwarzenegger. On Radio Times (Australia), James Mottram rated it 2/5 stars saying that the films is "complete with murky, night-vision-tinged visuals, it's all action and precious little character development."

Tyler Nichols of JoBlo.com wrote that "this is a simple story about a group of 'good guys' entering a war-torn country and saving a hostage. And it’s surprisingly good."
