= King Ivory =

2024 film by John Swab

- Theatrical release poster
- Directed by: John Swab
- Written by: John Swab
- Produced by: Jeremy M. Rosen
- Starring: James Badge Dale; Ben Foster; Michael Mando; Rory Cochrane; Ritchie Coster; George Carroll; Graham Greene; Melissa Leo
- Cinematography: Will Stone
- Edited by: Andrew Aaronson
- Production company: Roxwell Films
- Distributed by: Saban Films; Roadside Attractions (United States and Canada); Universal Pictures (International)
- Release dates: September 2, 2024 (Venice); November 14, 2025 (United States)
- Running time: 129 minutes
- Country: United States
- Language: English
- Box office: $154,681

King Ivory is a 2024 American action thriller film written and directed by John Swab. The film stars James Badge Dale, Ben Foster, Michael Mando, Graham Greene, and Melissa Leo.

The film premiered at the 81st edition of the Venice Film Festival in September 2, 2024, and was released on November 14, 2025.

James Badge Dale, Ben Foster, Michael Mando with Graham Greene and Oscar® Winner Melissa Leo (Best Supporting Actress, The Fighter, 2010) star in a gritty action crime thriller about the dangerous underworld of fentanyl cartels in middle America. Work hits too close to home for a drug cop when his son becomes an addict. He makes it his mission to take down those responsible, including the Mexican cartel, Indian Brotherhood War Chief, and the local Irish Mob.

== Cast ==
- James Badge Dale as Layne West
- Ben Foster as George 'Smiley' Greene
- Michael Mando as Ramón Garza
- Rory Cochrane as Beatty
- Ritchie Coster as Mickey Greene
- George Carroll as Ty Grady
- Graham Greene as Holt Lightfeather
- Melissa Leo as Ginger Greene
- Jasper Jones as Jack West

== Production ==
The film was shot in the Tulsa area during the summer of 2023. The production was made on a budget of under $7.5 million. Swab described the film as 'by far the most personal movie' he made.

== Release ==
The film premiered at the 81st Venice International Film Festival, in the "Orizzonti Extra" sidebar. In March 2025, Saban Films and Roadside Attractions acquired North American distribution, while Universal Pictures handled other territories. It was theatrically released on 752 screens in the United States on November 14, 2025.

== Reception ==
On the review aggregator website Rotten Tomatoes, 72% of 25 critics' reviews are positive, with an average rating of 6.5/10. Metacritic, which uses a weighted average, assigned the film a score of 60 out of 100, based on 6 critics, indicating "mixed or average" reviews.

The Hollywood Reporter's film critic Jordan Mintzer praised the film, describing it as "effective", "hard-nosed" and "above your average drug thriller", and noted "its uncompromisingly bleak view of fentanyl's damaging hold on the U.S. is not necessarily a crowd-pleaser, but it well deserves a look". Rodrigo Perez from The Playlist paired it to Steven Soderbergh's Traffic, and described the film as 'intense and engaging' and 'a terrific surprise'.

Screen International's Tim Grierson criticized the film, noting that while 'Swab creates a sense of constant propulsion [... ] and certainly the testosterone-fueled shootouts are muscular in their execution', 'the high-octane King Ivory is intense without being insightful' and it 'rarely surprises'.
