= Wheelman (film) =

2017 film by Jeremy Rush

- Release poster
- Directed by: Jeremy Rush
- Written by: Jeremy Rush
- Produced by: Joe Carnahan; Craig Chapman; Frank Grillo; Myles Nestel
- Starring: Frank Grillo; Garret Dillahunt; Caitlin Carmichael; Wendy Moniz
- Cinematography: Juan Miguel Azpiroz
- Edited by: Padraic McKinley
- Music by: Brooke Blair; Will Blair
- Production companies: The Solution Entertainment Group; WarParty Films
- Distributed by: Netflix
- Release date: October 20, 2017
- Running time: 82 minutes
- Country: United States
- Language: English
- Budget: $5 million

Wheelman is a 2017 American neo-noir crime thriller film written and directed by Jeremy Rush. It stars Frank Grillo (who also produced) as a getaway driver who must figure out who set him up after a botched robbery; Garret Dillahunt, Shea Whigham, and Caitlin Carmichael also star. It contains 286 uses of the word "fuck", among the most ever in a narrative film.

The film was released on Netflix on October 20, 2017, and received generally positive reviews from critics.

== Plot ==
An unnamed getaway driver picks up a BMW 3 Series (E46) for a bank robbery. En route to pick up the crew, he receives a call from his 13-year-old daughter Katie, and is unable to reach Clay, an associate who arranged the robbery. Driving the crew to the bank, the driver refuses to reveal his name, referring to himself as the “Wheelman”. As the crew carry out the robbery, Wheelman receives a call from the "Handler" who apparently contracted the crew, instructing him to abandon the men once they place the money in the trunk, as they have been ordered to kill him at the drop-off. The Handler warns Wheelman not to answer any calls but his, and Wheelman drives off with the money, leaving the crew behind.

On the Handler’s instructions, Wheelman counts the stolen $230,000, unknowingly tailed by a motorcyclist. Wheelman ignores repeated calls and menacing texts from an unknown number. Clay calls, and Wheelman accuses him of arranging a set-up. The Handler gives Wheelman a location to bring the money, but Wheelman realizes the hand-off is a drug deal and flees. He calls Clay, demanding to be let out of the job, but Clay threatens to tell the Handler that Wheelman has stolen the money. Realizing he is being followed by the motorcyclist, Wheelman receives an angry voicemail from his ex-wife Jessica, Katie’s mother. The Handler calls, threatening Wheelman for disobeying him, and the motorcyclist shoots at Wheelman, who manages to outmaneuver him and escape.

After shaking off the motorcyclist, Wheelman tracks down Clay and forces him into the car at gunpoint. He answers a call from the unknown caller, who accuses both he and Clay of double-crossing him. Another driver shoots at them but they escape, and Clay admits that he arranged the robbery for the head of the West End gang, but was paid by a new leader of the Philadelphia crime family to steal the money for him instead. The Handler is actually the Philly leader, while the unknown caller is the West End leader. Wheelman decides to go to the West End gang, to whom he is indebted for protecting his family while he was in prison. He urges Clay to leave town, but Clay, fearing he will eventually be killed anyway, pulls out a gun and tries to kill Wheelman for the money, only to shoot himself in the head.

The Philly leader calls, threatening to harm Jessica and Katie. Wheelman calls Katie, telling her to meet him at a parking garage. He calls Jessica to warn her, but hears her being abducted. The West End leader calls and agrees to help, telling Wheelman to arrange a drop-off with the Philly leader so the West End leader can kill him. Wheelman does so, and is attacked by one of the robbers whom he ditched, but manages to kill him. After discovering a tracking device in one of the bags of money, Wheelman takes the money and sets the car on fire.

He meets Katie, who drove his 1985 Porsche 911 Carrera 3.2 to the garage, and tells her to go to her uncle's house and wait for her mother's call. Instead, Katie follows him to the top floor and watches as he confronts the Philly gang. Jessica is handed over, and Wheelman distracts the gang with a Molotov cocktail. Jessica escapes, and Katie picks up her father. Taking the wheel, he leads the Philly gang into an ambush by the West End gang, and the Philly leader is executed by the West End leader. Wheelman hands over the money, and departs with Katie. They arrive at a restaurant where Jessica is waiting, and Wheelman watches as she and Katie embrace.

== Cast ==
- Frank Grillo as Wheelman
- Garret Dillahunt as Clay
- Caitlin Carmichael as Katie
- Wendy Moniz as Jessica
- Slaine as Jazz Handler
- John Cenatiempo as Real Handler
- Shea Whigham as Mohawk Man
- Jeffrey Samai as Ben Okri (Bank Robber)

== Production ==
On May 10, 2016, it was reported that Frank Grillo would play the titular role in the action thriller film Wheelman, which would be directed by Jeremy Rush from his own script, while Grillo would also produce the film along with Joe Carnahan and Myles Nestel of The Solution Entertainment Group. On May 17, 2016, Netflix acquired the worldwide rights to the film, which was financed by The Solution.

Principal photography began on September 12, 2016, in Boston's Fort Point. Filming lasted 19 days, later also taking place in Lawrence, Massachusetts.

== Release ==
Wheelman was released on Netflix on October 20, 2017.

== Reception ==
On the review aggregator website Rotten Tomatoes, the film holds an approval rating of 87% based on 23 reviews, with an average rating of 6.9/10. The website's critics consensus reads, "Wheelman takes B-movie action lovers on an uncommonly smooth ride, with taut plotting and exciting action topped off with solid work from Frank Grillo in the title role." Metacritic assigned the film a weighted average score of 66 out of 100, based on four critics, indicating "generally favorable" reviews.
