= One Day as a Lion (film) =

- Release poster
- Directed by: John Swab
- Written by: Scott Caan
- Produced by: Jeremy M. Rosen
- Starring: Scott Caan; Frank Grillo; J. K. Simmons
- Cinematography: Will Stone
- Edited by: Andrew Aaronson
- Music by: David Sardy
- Production company: Roxwell Films
- Distributed by: Grindstone Entertainment Group
- Release date: April 4, 2023
- Running time: 87 minutes
- Country: United States
- Language: English

One Day as a Lion is a 2023 American action thriller comedy film directed by John Swab, written by Scott Caan, and starring Caan, Frank Grillo and J. K. Simmons.

== Cast ==
- Scott Caan as Jackie Powers
- J. K. Simmons as Walter Boggs
- Marianne Rendón as Lola Brisky
- Virginia Madsen as Valerie Brisky
- Frank Grillo as Pauly Russo
- Taryn Manning as Taylor Love
- Billy Blair as Ken Walsh
- Bruce Davis as Bob
- George Carroll as Dom Lorenzo
- Dash Melrose as Billy Powers

== Production ==
Filming occurred in Oklahoma in June 2022.

== Release ==
The film was released in select theaters on April 4, 2023. Then it was released on demand and digital on April 7, 2023.

== Reception ==
The film has a 64% rating on Rotten Tomatoes based on 22 reviews.

Noel Murray of the Los Angeles Times gave the film a positive review and wrote, "Nevertheless, the movie has the kind of personality and heart too often missing from grimy little crime pictures. It’s endearingly ramshackle."

Peter Martin of Screen Anarchy also gave the film a positive review and wrote, "One Day as a Lion is sufficiently likable to overcome its evident shortcomings and makes for a roughly criminal B-picture."
