= Little Dixie (film) =

2023 American crime thriller film by John Swab

- Festival release poster
- Directed by: John Swab
- Written by: John Swab
- Produced by: Robert Ogden Barnum; Jeremy M. Rosen; John Swab
- Starring: Frank Grillo; Eric Dane; Beau Knapp; Annabeth Gish; Peter Greene; Thomas Dekker; Mercedes Mason; Maurice Compte
- Cinematography: Will Stone
- Edited by: Andrew Aaronson
- Music by: David Sardy
- Production companies: Roxwell Films; TPC
- Distributed by: Paramount Pictures
- Release dates: January 28, 2023 (IFFR); February 3, 2023 (United States)
- Running time: 105 minutes
- Country: United States
- Language: English

Little Dixie is a 2023 American crime thriller film written and directed by John Swab. It stars Frank Grillo, Eric Dane, Beau Knapp, Annabeth Gish, Peter Greene, Thomas Dekker, Mercedes Mason, and Maurice Compte.

The film premiered at the 2023 International Film Festival Rotterdam, and was released in select theaters and video on demand in the United States on February 3, 2023, by Paramount Pictures.

== Premise ==
Ex-Special Forces operative Doc Alexander works as a fixer, upholding a secret truce between his old colleague, corrupt Governor of Oklahoma Richard Jeffs, and Mexican drug cartel head Lalo Prado, who helped get Jeffs elected. Jeffs breaks the truce with new tough-on-cartel crime policies, leading to the execution of Lalo's brother Juan during a police raid. Swearing revenge, Lalo sends his half-brother Cuco after Jeffs; Cuco kidnaps Doc's daughter Nell, demanding that Doc kill Jeffs and bring his head in exchange for her return.

== Cast ==
- Frank Grillo as Doc Alexander
- Eric Dane as Governor Richard Jeffs
- Beau Knapp as Raphael "Cuco" Prado
- Annabeth Gish as Billie Riggs
- Peter Greene as Karl Roach
- Thomas Dekker as Clarke Moore
- Mercedes Mason as Julie Reed
- Maurice Compte as Lalo Miguel Prado
- Sofia Bryant as Nell Alexander
- Mark Ward as Misty
- Luis Da Silva as Juan Miguel Prado
- Sufe Bradshaw as Carla
- George Carroll as Texas Ranger William Autry

== Production ==
Filming took place in Oklahoma, including Tulsa, Catoosa, Sand Springs, and Owasso, and wrapped in December 2021.

== Release ==
In January 2022, Paramount Pictures acquired worldwide distribution rights to Little Dixie, with plans to release it in the second half of that year.

The film's world premiere was held at the International Film Festival Rotterdam on January 28, 2023. It was released in select theaters, on digital, and video on demand in the United States on February 3, 2023.
