= IMurders =

iMurders
- Directed by: Robbie Bryan
- Written by: Robbie Bryan and Ken Del Vecchio
- Produced by: Jeff Quinlan; Robbie Bryan; Brooke Lewis
- Cinematography: Taroo Takaoka
- Edited by: Yasu Inoue
- Music by: Harry Manfredini
- Distributed by: Anchor Bay Entertainment
- Release date: August 9, 2008
- Country: United States
- Language: English

iMurders is a 2008 horror film starring Gabrielle Anwar, William Forsythe, Tony Todd and Billy Dee Williams.

== Plot ==
When the participants of an internet chat room are brutally murdered in succession, one person's past holds the key to the gruesome mystery.

== Cast ==
- Gabrielle Anwar as Lindsay Jefferies
- William Forsythe as Professor Uberoth
- Tony Todd as Agent Washington
- Frank Grillo as Joe Romano
- Terri Colombino as Sandra Wilson
- Wilson Jermaine Heredia as Mark Sanders
- Charles Durning as Dr. Seamus St. Martin
- Billy Dee Williams as Robert Delgado
- Miranda Kwok as Janet Ling
- Brooke Lewis as Agent Lori Romano

== Production ==
Filming took place in various New Jersey locations and some photography took place in Beverly Hills & Hollywood. It was released under the tagline "You don't know who you're talking to..."

== Reception ==
Horror Society was positive about the production. Horror.com wrote "iMurders might have been a decent timewaster for the Lifetime Channel of some-such, but I just can't recommend a purchase of the DVD…" while Dread Central found the film had "fairly typical, predictable, and often times scattered. It also contains some genuine WTF moments, and I don't really mean that in a good way."
