= My Heart Can't Beat Unless You Tell It To =

- Film poster
- Directed by: Jonathan Cuartas
- Written by: Jonathan Cuartas
- Produced by: Jesse R. Brown; Patrick Fugit; Anthony Pedone
- Starring: Patrick Fugit; Owen Campbell
- Cinematography: Michael Cuartas
- Edited by: T.J. Nelson
- Music by: Andrew Rease Shaw
- Distributed by: Dark Sky Films
- Release date: July 28, 2020 (Shanghai Film Festival)
- Running time: 90 mins
- Country: United States
- Languages: English; Spanish

My Heart Can't Beat Unless You Tell It To is a 2020 American psychological horror drama film written and directed by Jonathan Cuartas and starring Patrick Fugit, Ingrid Sophie Schram, and Owen Campbell.

== Plot ==
Siblings Jessie and Dwight care for their chronically ill younger brother Thomas, who is unable to venture outdoors during the day and must subsist on blood. Dwight and Jessie provide blood for Thomas by murdering strangers, mainly homeless people and drifters. To earn money, Jessie waits tables in a local diner, while Dwight pawns items he finds around town or takes from their victims. Dwight often visits Pam, a prostitute whom he pays extra for a few minutes' conversation after their liaisons.

After a particularly grisly murder, Dwight begs Jessie to get real medical help for Thomas. She refuses and instead orders Dwight to procure a new victim.

Dwight attempts to strangle a Spanish-speaking migrant named Eduardo, who escapes and wounds him with a screwdriver. Dwight chases down and subdues Eduardo, but his desperate pleas for mercy convince Dwight to spare him. He restrains Eduardo in a shed in the yard. Angered when Dwight returns home without a blood source, Jessie kills Pam, leaving him distraught.

That night at the dinner table, Thomas complains of loneliness and implores Jessie to let him socialize with the children he hears outside his window. When she refuses, he overturns his bowl of blood, infuriating her. Eduardo escapes the shed and attacks Dwight, who reluctantly kills him as Thomas looks on.

The next day, Thomas writes a note on a paper airplane and opens the front door to hurl it at a group of passing teenagers. Dwight quickly covers him with a blanket and pulls him back inside, but not before Thomas sustains severe burns on his arm.

Turner, one of the teenagers who found the note, comes to the house while Jessie is away looking for a victim. Thomas invites him in and tries to connect with him by playing a guessing game involving the release year of songs Thomas plays on the piano, and offering him blood to drink. When Dwight enters the kitchen and discovers Turner, Dwight threatens him with a knife, but is about to let him go when he hears Jessie returning home with a new victim and pushes Turner into a closet, ordering him to be quiet. When Jessie hears him and opens the closet door over Dwight's pleas not to, Turner stabs her with a kitchen knife and flees. Although bleeding heavily, Jessie orders Dwight to pursue and kill Turner. Thomas goes to her side as she pulls out the knife and bleeds to death in the bathtub, exhorting him to take her blood and apologizing for being mean to him.

Dwight finds Turner, but spares his life and drives him back home to his single father, warning him not to return. Dwight goes back home to find Jessie dead in the bathtub and Thomas consuming her blood. Enraged, Dwight hits Thomas and locks him in a room with Jessie's last victim. Dwight buries Jessie, then washes the store of blood down the sink and throws the bucket away.

In the morning, Dwight packs his things and tells Thomas he is leaving and never coming back. After seeing a happy family at a diner, he has a change of heart. Dwight returns home and finds Thomas under a blanket. Thomas apologizes for his role in Jessie's death, and the brothers embrace and cry together. Thomas then asks Dwight to remove the cardboard covering the window. Dwight does this, weeping as sunlight fills the room.

Alone, Dwight drives across the country and stops at a jetty. Immersed in thought, he stands looking over the water.

== Cast ==
- Patrick Fugit as Dwight
- Owen Campbell as Thomas
- Ingrid Sophie Schram as Jessie
- Katie Preston as Pam
- Moises Tovar as Eduardo
- Judah Bateman as Turner

== Production ==
Principal photography began in May 2019 in Salt Lake City. The film was scheduled to have its world premiere at the 19th Tribeca Film Festival in April 2020 before the festival was postponed because of the COVID-19 pandemic (COVID-19).

== Release ==
In September 2020, it was announced that Dark Sky Films acquired U.S. distribution rights to the film.

== Reception ==
Bobby LePire of Film Threat gave the film a 7 out of 10. On review aggregator website Rotten Tomatoes, the film holds an approval rating of 98% based on 48 reviews, with an average rating of 7.7/10 and the site's consensus states: "Unsettling and compelling in equal measure, My Heart Can't Beat Unless You Tell It To casts a visually striking and thought-provoking spell."
