= Special Teamz =

American hip hop group

- Genres: Hip hop
- Labels: Duck Down Records
- Members: Edo G Jaysaun; Slaine

Special Teamz is an American hip hop group made of Boston rappers Edo G (formerly of Da Bulldogs), Jaysaun (formerly of the Kreators) and Slaine (of La Coka Nostra).

All three members are of different racial backgrounds: Edo G is African-American, Jaysaun is mixed Puerto Rican, African-American, and Jewish, and Slaine is Irish-American.

In 2005, the group released a self-titled mixtape cd (mixed by DJ Jayceeoh, who also supports Special Teamz live on stage) and a 12" vinyl single, and then went on what was almost a two-year search for a record label. Eventually, Sean Price of Heltah Skeltah engaged a deal signing the group to Duck Down Records. They released their debut album "Stereotypez" on September 25, 2007, with production by Pete Rock, Ill Bill, DJ Premier, and several up and coming producers from Boston.

The same year Slaine appeared in a supporting role in Ben Affleck's film, Gone Baby Gone. The group's song, "Fallen Angelz" can be heard in one of the film's scenes.

== Discography ==
- The Mixtape (CD, 2005)
- Main Event (single) (12" vinyl, 2005)
- Stereotypez (CD/vinyl/digital, 2007)
