= Owen Campbell (actor) =

American actor

Owen Campbell (born June 9, 1994) is an American actor. He played lead roles in the films As You Are (2016), Super Dark Times (2017), and My Heart Can't Beat Unless You Tell It To (2020). On television, he played Jared Connors in The Americans.

== Early life ==
Campbell grew up in Brooklyn and attended Fiorello H. LaGuardia High School.

== Filmography ==
=== Film ===
Year	Title	Role	Notes
2009	White Lightnin'	Young Jesco White	
2010	Bitter Feast	Johnny	
2010	Conviction	Ben	
2012	The Perks of Being a Wallflower	Michael	Deleted scene
2013	Very Good Girls	Karl	
2016	As You Are	Jack	
2016	Collective: Unconscious	St. Helens High Student	
2016	The Hudson Tribes	Avi	
2017	Super Dark Times	Zach Taylor	
2017	The Strange Ones	Luke	
2017	Blame	T.J.	
2018	Nancy	Jordan	
2018	The Miseducation of Cameron Post	Mark	
2019	Depraved	Alex	
2019	Above the Shadows	Troy	
2019	Josie & Jack	Kevin	
2020	My Heart Can't Beat Unless You Tell It To	Thomas	
2021	Body Brokers	Sid	
2022	X	R.J. Nichols	
2022	Candy Land	Levi	
2026	Primetime	Matt the Waiter	

=== Television ===
Year	Title	Role	Notes
2008	Law & Order: SVU	Kyle Fredericks	Episode: "Retro"
2013	Boardwalk Empire	Clayton Davies	4 episodes
2013–2014	Alpha House	Dilly DeSantis	3 episodes
2014	The Following	Cole	Episode: "The Messenger"
2014	The Americans	Jared Connors	Recurring (season 2)
2014	Believe	Sean	3 episodes
2016	Bull	Peter Walsh	Episode: "Light My Fire"
2019–2021	Crank Yankers	Puppeteer	30 episodes
