= John Swab =

American screenwriter

- Born: September 16, 1988 (age 38); Tulsa, Oklahoma, U.S.
- Occupations: Film director, writer, producer
- Years active: 2015–present

John Swab (born September 16, 1988) is an American film director, screenwriter, and producer. He is known for King Ivory (2024), Candy Land (2022) and Body Brokers (2021).

== Personal life ==
Swab married musician Sam Quartin on November 5, 2017. The couple previously lived in upstate New York before relocating to Swab's hometown of Tulsa, Oklahoma in 2021.

== Filmography ==
=== Film ===
Year	Title	Director	Writer	Producer
2016	Let Me Make You a Martyr	Yes	Yes	Yes
2019	Run with the Hunted	Yes	Yes	Yes
2021	Body Brokers	Yes	Yes	Yes
2021	Ida Red	Yes	Yes	Yes
2022	Candy Land	Yes	Yes	Yes
2023	Little Dixie	Yes	Yes	Yes
2023	One Day as a Lion	Yes	No	No
2024	King Ivory	Yes	Yes	No
2024	Long Gone Heroes	Yes	Yes	No
TBA	Copperhead †	Yes	No	No

=== Short films ===
Year	Title	Director	Writer	Producer
2014	Judas' Chariot	Yes	Yes	Yes

=== Recurring collaborations ===
Film	Slaine	Mark Boone Junior	Sam Quartin	Melissa Leo	Owen Campbell
Let Me Make You a Martyr (2016)	Yes	Yes	Yes		
Run with the Hunted (2019)	Yes	Yes	Yes		
Body Brokers (2021)			Yes	Yes	Yes
Ida Red (2021)	Yes	Yes		Yes	
Candy Land (2022)			Yes		Yes
Little Dixie (2023)	Yes				
One Day as a Lion (2023)	Yes				
King Ivory (2024)	Yes		Yes	Yes	
Long Gone Heroes (2024)	Yes			Yes	
