= Body Brokers =

- Theatrical release poster
- Directed by: John Swab
- Written by: John Swab
- Produced by: Robert Ogden Barnum; Oliver Ridge; Jeremy M. Rosen; John Swab
- Starring: Jack Kilmer; Michael Kenneth Williams; Jessica Rothe; Alice Englert; Peter Greene; Frank Grillo; Melissa Leo
- Cinematography: Matt Clegg
- Edited by: John David Allen
- Music by: Chris Keating
- Production company: Roxwell Films
- Distributed by: Vertical Entertainment
- Release date: February 19, 2021 (United States)
- Running time: 111 minutes
- Country: United States
- Language: English

Body Brokers is a 2021 American crime drama film written and directed by John Swab and starring Jack Kilmer, Michael Kenneth Williams, Jessica Rothe, Alice Englert, Peter Greene, Frank Grillo, and Melissa Leo. The film concerns a young drug addict brought to Los Angeles for treatment and to start his life over. The man learns the rehab center is not meant to help drug abusers, but is really an organized health insurance fraud ring enlisting addicts to recruit other addicts.

It had a limited release in the United States on February 19, 2021, by Vertical Entertainment.

== Plot ==
The film opens with a commercial for New West Recovery (NWR), a Los Angeles-based rehab center founded by ex-addict Vin. In narration, Vin boasts that, thanks to the 2010 passage of Barack Obama's Affordable Care Act, drug addiction and recovery are now pre-existing conditions, creating a large industrial complex for treatment clinics across Southern California alone.

In Columbus, Ohio, homeless junkie couple Utah and Opal rob convenience stores to fund their habit. Opal also makes money as a sex worker for truckers. While panhandling, the duo encounter NWR sponsor Wood, who offers them a meal and an opportunity to get clean. Opal assumes Wood is a Christian proselytizer, but the man reiterates he's only offering drug rehabilitation. Utah accepts the offer and flies to Los Angeles with Wood. Opal, hardened by heroin and crack addiction, stays behind in Ohio.

After a few weeks, Utah shows improvement and attempts to persuade Opal to join him, but she's indifferent to his progress and refuses her own treatment. With Wood's assistance, Opal finally decides to "enroll" as a NWR patient, and Utah is provided a kickback for the referral. Soon, Utah, like Wood, becomes a multi-level marketer for NWR, earning tens of thousands of dollars in other referrals, over-billed tests, and frivolous medical procedures. Vin brags about his schemes (in narration), while Utah wrestles with his inner morals.

The scams appear to be victimless, non-violent crimes until one of NWR's accomplices, the corrupt Dr. Riner, wants a bigger take on a controversial surgical procedure, and insults Wood and Utah. Wood beats Riner to death and buries his body. Vin recommends Wood and Utah leave town for a few days and keep a low profile.

A short time later, Vin sets Utah up with a new referral in a parked car at LAX. Before stepping foot into MWR's facility, Utah allows the man one more fix. While the man is unconscious, Utah notices more heroin and decides to get a hit himself, but fatally overdoses. Because Utah was vulnerable to relapse without intervention, it is suggested this meeting was engineered by Vin to cover loose ends in Riner's murder.

An epilogue notes current statistics of addiction and overdoses, how many more criminal enterprises like NWR exist, and that twelve-step programs are the most effective method to treat addiction (and don't cost any money).

== Cast ==
- Jack Kilmer as Utah
- Michael Kenneth Williams as Wood
- Jessica Rothe as May
- Alice Englert as Opal
- Peter Greene as Dr. Riner
- Frank Grillo as Vin
- Melissa Leo as Dr. White
- Thomas Dekker as Jacko
- Sam Quartin as Tina
- Renée Willett as Penny
- Pam Dougherty as Miss Tee

== Production ==
In July 2019, Melissa Leo, Michael Kenneth Williams, Frank Grillo, Alice Englert, and Jack Kilmer joined the cast of the film, with John Swab directing from a screenplay he wrote. In August 2019, Jessica Rothe, Owen Campbell, Thomas Dekker, Peter Greene and Sam Quartin joined the cast of the film.

Principal photography took place in August 2019 in Oklahoma.

== Release ==
In December 2020, Vertical Entertainment acquired distribution rights to the film, and set it for a February 19, 2021, release.

== Reception ==
On review aggregator website Rotten Tomatoes, Body Brokers holds an approval rating of 64% based on 25 reviews, with an average rating of 5.7/10. The site's critical consensus reads, "Body Brokers attempts an ambitious juggling act between genre thrills and a serious social message -- and unfortunately fumbles a little too often to really pull it off." On Metacritic, the film holds an average weighted score of 65 out of 100, based on five critics, indicating "generally favorable" reviews.
