= Mark Boone Junior =

American actor (born 1955)

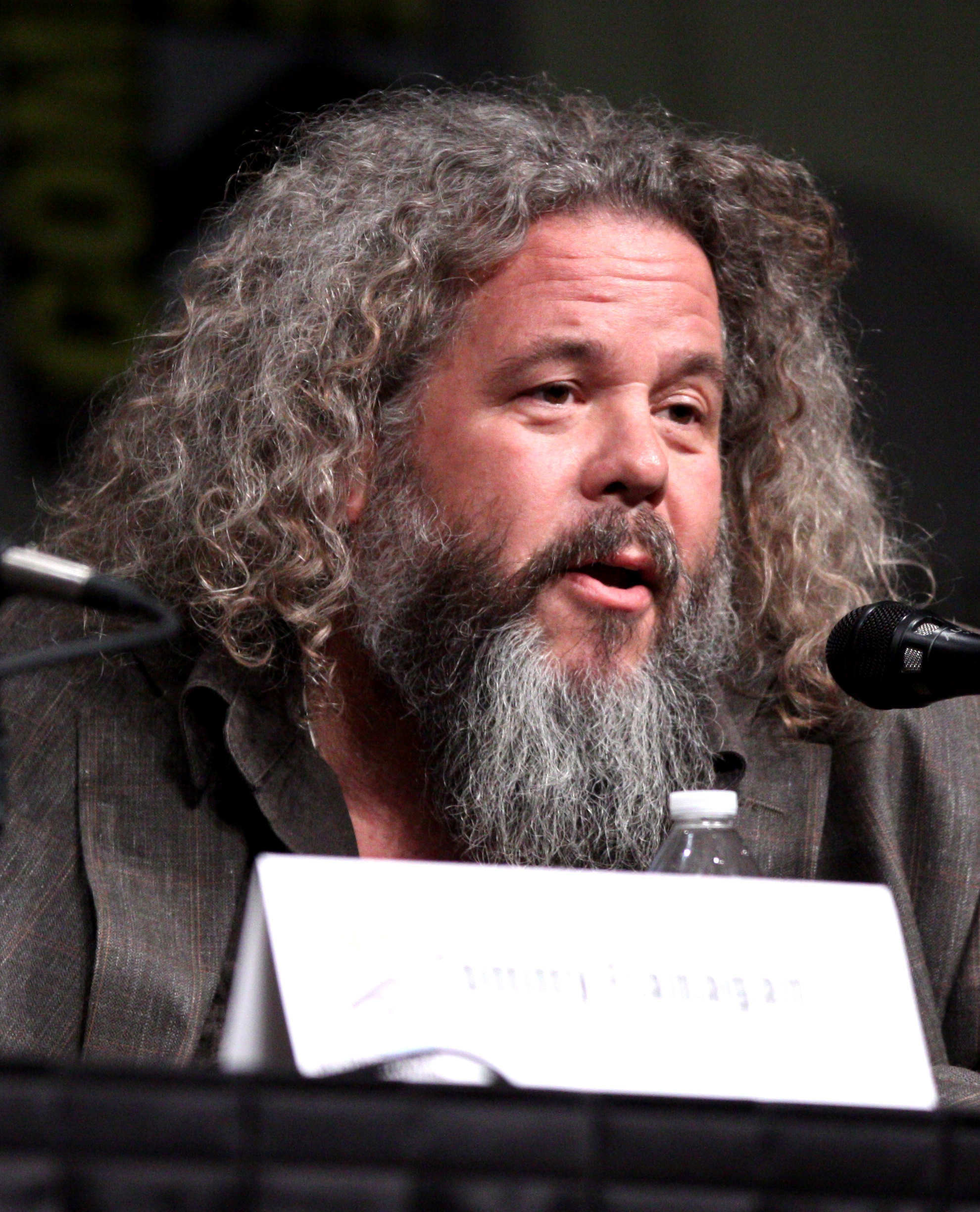
- Boone Junior in 2012
- Born: Mark Heidrich; March 17, 1955 (age 71); Cincinnati, Ohio, U.S.
- Occupation: Actor
- Years active: 1983–present

Mark Boone Junior (born Mark Heidrich; March 17, 1955) is an American character actor, best known for his television roles as Bobby Munson in Sons of Anarchy (2008–2014) and Patrick "Pat" Brown in The Last Man on Earth (2016–2017), as well as his film roles in Die Hard 2 (1990), Memento (2000), 2 Fast 2 Furious (2003) and Batman Begins (2005).

== Early life and education ==
Boone was born Mark Heidrich in Cincinnati, Ohio, to Ginny, a retired teacher, and Bob Heidrich, a former construction consultant. He grew up on Chicago's North Shore and attended the University of Vermont, where he played on the men's soccer team. He moved to New York after college, where he started his career performing stand-up comedy with long-time friend Steve Buscemi. His stage name surname, Boone, is also his nickname; he chose it from a New York City war memorial.

== Career ==
Boone frequently portrays a corrupt policeman or other authority figure, such as in Seven (as an FBI agent) and as corrupt Detective Flass in Batman Begins. He has performed in over 70 movies, including 2 Fast 2 Furious, Get Carter, The General's Daughter, The Thin Red Line, and Die Hard 2. He has made guest appearances on TV in Law & Order, Seinfeld, Curb Your Enthusiasm, and several other shows. He played a small role in Armageddon and in an episode of the HBO prison drama series Oz. In 1984, he acted in The Way It Is or Eurydice in the Avenues (1985) by Eric Mitchell, which included actors Steve Buscemi and Rockets Redglare. He has appeared in some of Buscemi's directorial work, including Trees Lounge and as "Evil" in Lonesome Jim. In 1987, Boone co-starred with Richard Edson in Not a Door: A Spectacle, Scott B and Joseph Nechvatal's collaborative art performance at Hallwalls based on the poetry of St. John of the Cross, Flaubert's Temptation of St. Anthony and works of Jean Genet and Georges Bataille. He played Dr. Eduard Gillespie in the 2023 film Atrabilious.

Boone was a regular cast member on the TV drama series Sons of Anarchy, playing Bobby "Elvis" Munson. In an episode of the TV series Quantum Leap, he played a biker named Maddog, similar to his character many years later in Sons of Anarchy. In 2011, he played the role of Vincent Dooly's father in The Mother of Invention.

He has appeared in two Christopher Nolan films: Memento, as Burt, the front desk manager at the Discount Inn, and Batman Begins, as Arnold Flass, James Gordon's crooked partner.

== Filmography ==
=== Film and television ===
Year	Title	Role	Notes
1983	Variety	Porn Customer / Business Manager	
1983	Born in Flames	Man on subway	Credited as Mark Heidrich
1986	The Equalizer	Time	Episode: "Nightscape"
1986	The Visit	The visited	
1986	The Way It Is		
1988	Above the Law	Man in Window	
1988	Landlord Blues	George	
1989	Prisoners of Inertia	Weed	
1989	New York Stories	Hanks	
1989	The Equalizer	Hall	Episode: "Silent Fury"
1989	Slaves of New York	Mitch	
1989	Borders	Bob	
1989	Cookie	Policeman	
1989	Last Exit to Brooklyn	Willie	
1990	In the Spirit	Policeman #3	
1990	Force of Circumstance		
1990	Die Hard 2	Shockley	
1990	Law & Order	Garage Manager	TV series
1990	Quantum Leap	Biker	TV series
1991	Fever	Leonard	Television film
1991	Delirious	Cable Man	
1991	In the Heat of the Night	Barney Meacham	TV series
1991	The Wonder Years	Repairman	
1992	The Paint Job	Tom	
1992	What Happened to Pete	Pete	
1992	Seinfeld	OTB Patron	TV series
1992	Sketch Artist	Sturges	
1992	Of Mice and Men	Bus Driver	
1993	Daybreak	Quarantine Guard	Television film
1993	Bakersfield P.D.	Ed	TV series
1993	Geronimo: An American Legend	Afraid Miner	
1994	Hoggs' Heaven	Carl	Television film
1995	The Quick and the Dead	Scars	
1995	Naomi & Wynonna: Love Can Build a Bridge	Redneck	Television film
1995	Last of the Dogmen	Tattoo	
1995	Seven	Greasy FBI Man	
1996	Trees Lounge	Mike	Also in Special Thanks; Wrote and performed the song "Run the Red Light Baby"
1996	The Beatnicks	Taxi Driver	
1997	Hack	Ed	
1997	Rosewood	Poly	
1997	The Game	Shady Private Investigator	
1997	Cold Around the Heart	Angry Man	
1997	Hugo Pool	Pool Supply Man	
1998	Montana	Stykes	
1998	Vampires	Catlin	
1998	Armageddon	New York Guy	Uncredited
1998	I Woke Up Early the Day I Died	Cop #3	
1998	The Treat	Bruce	
1998	October 22	Bob	
1998	I Still Know What You Did Last Summer	Pawn Shop Owner	
1998	The Thin Red Line	Private David Christopher Peale	
1999	Smut		
1999	Spanish Judges	Piece	
1999	The Wetonkawa Flash	Harley Henson	
1999	The General's Daughter	Dalbert Elkins	
1999	Buddy Boy	Vic	
1999	A.T.F.	Jake Neill	Television film
2000	The Beat Nicks	Nick Beat	
2000	Animal Factory	Paul Adams	
2000	Everything Put Together	Bill	
2000	Memento	Burt	
2000	Get Carter	Jim Davis	
2000	The Gold Cup	Max	
2001	Ordinary Madness	Leo	
2001	Proximity	Eric Hawthorne	
2001	Curb Your Enthusiasm	Homeless Man	TV series
2002	Long Time No See	Mr. Walters	
2002	The Real Deal	Cameron LaFoya	
2003	Shade	Leipzig	
2003	2 Fast 2 Furious	Detective Whitworth	
2003	Greasewood Flat	Fred	
2003	Wild Turkey		
2003	Beautiful	Hank	
2004	Full Clip	Sheriff Wallace	
2004	Sawtooth	'Clench'	
2004	The Grey	Jake Cantrell	Also producer and writer
2004	Jam	Ralph	
2004	Dead Birds	Joseph	
2004	Frankenfish	Joseph	
2005	Venice Underground	Wexler Reed	
2005	Lonesome Jim	Evil	
2005	Carnivàle	Alvin	TV series
2005	The Nickel Children	The Driver	
2005	Batman Begins	Arnold Flass	
2006	The Legend of Lucy Keyes	Jonas Dodd	
2006	Wristcutters: A Love Story	Mike	
2006	Unknown	Bearded Man	
2006	One Night With You	Jake Tarlow	
2007	If I Had Known I Was a Genius	Engine Man	
2007	30 Days of Night	Beau Brower	
2008	Vice	Bugsby	
2008	Frozen River	Jacques Bruno	
2008	In Plain Sight	Neil 'Spanky' Carson	TV series
2008	A Perfect Place	Tom	
2008	California Indian	Jonathan Jensen	
2008–2014	Sons of Anarchy	Robert 'Bobby Elvis' Munson	TV series
2009	The Donner Party	Franklin Graves	
2009	Spooner	George	
2009	Pinned		
2009	Halloween II	Floyd	
2010	The Mother of Invention	Bill Dooly	
2010	Happiness Runs	Victor's Father	
2011	Missing Pieces	David Lindale	
2011	Pete Smalls Is Dead	Jack	
2012	Tron: Uprising	Kobol	1 episode
2013	Look at Me	Randy	
2014	Law & Order: Special Victims Unit	Roger Pierson	
2014	Life of Crime	Richard	
2014	Helicopter Mom	Max	
2014	Hell's Kitchen	Himself	Reality series; VIP chef's table guest for Jason Zepaltas' kitchen in the Season 12 finale.
2016	The Birth of a Nation	Reverend Walthall	
2016	American Romance	Hank	
2016	Let Me Make You a Martyr	Larry Glass	
2016	Flaked	Jerry	TV series
2016–2017	The Last Man on Earth	Pat Brown	4 episodes
2017	American Satan	Elias	
2017	Elementary	Guitar Expert	Episode: The Ballad of Lady Frances
2017	Ghost House	Reno	
2017	The Jade Pendant	Captain Wynne	
2017-2018	Patriot	Rob Saperstein	5 episodes
2019	The Mandalorian	Ranzar Malk	Episode: "Chapter 6: The Prisoner"
2019	Run with the Hunted	Sway	
2021	The Gateway	Gary	
2021	Ida Red	Benson Drummond	
2021	Paradise City	Elias	TV spinoff of American Satan
2021–2024	Hightown	Petey	4 episodes
2022	A Little White Lie	Lenny	
2023	Dark Harvest	Butcher	
2025	O'Dessa	Father Walt	
2025	Atrabilious	Eduard Gillespie	
2026	Vampires of the Velvet Lounge	Chuck	

=== Video games ===
Year	Title	Voice role	Notes
2005	Batman Begins	Arnold Flass	
