= Ida Red (film) =

2021 film by John Swab

- Theatrical release poster
- Directed by: John Swab
- Written by: John Swab
- Produced by: Jeremy M. Rosen; John Swab; Robert Ogden Barnum
- Starring: Josh Hartnett; Sofia Hublitz; William Forsythe; Deborah Ann Woll; George Carroll; Mark Boone Junior; Beau Knapp; Frank Grillo; Melissa Leo
- Cinematography: Matt Clegg
- Edited by: John David Allen
- Music by: David Sardy
- Production company: Roxwell Films
- Distributed by: Saban Films
- Release dates: August 11, 2021 (Locarno); November 5, 2021 (United States)
- Running time: 111 minutes
- Country: United States
- Language: English

Ida Red is a 2021 American action crime thriller film written, directed, and co-produced by John Swab. It stars an ensemble cast that includes Josh Hartnett, Sofia Hublitz, William Forsythe, Deborah Ann Woll, George Carroll, Mark Boone Junior, Beau Knapp, Frank Grillo, and Melissa Leo. It follows an incarcerated crime boss who, living on borrowed time, turns to her son and brother to pull off one huge heist to buy her freedom.

The film had its world premiere at the 74th Locarno Film Festival on August 11, 2021. It was released in select theaters and on VOD on November 5, 2021, by Saban Films. It received mixed reviews from critics.

== Plot ==
Ida "Red" Walker (Melissa Leo), the biological mother of a criminal family, sits rotting in jail. She is a widow as a result of the bust that nabbed her. Now that she's got cancer, she wants to die in freedom. So she plots both a parole and, true to form, a heist.

Her son is a successful career criminal, ethical Wyatt (Josh Hartnett) and so is her brother, psycho Dallas (Frank Grillo). There is also her daughter Jeanie (Deborah Ann Woll), estranged from Ida because she married kind and dim cop Bodie Collier (George Carroll). Their rebellious teen kid Darla (Sofia Hublitz) is drawn to uncle Wyatt and is romantically involved with local dirtbag Petey (Nicholas Cirillo).

Wyatt's having a hard time after a truck heist goes wrong, and cranky FBI Special Agent Lawrence Twilley (William Forsythe), who is partnering with Collier, is on the trail. Dallas, who appoints himself cleaner, nastily shoots people responsible for the screw-up, or their kin.

== Cast ==
- Josh Hartnett as Wyatt Walker
- Frank Grillo as Dallas Walker
- Melissa Leo as Ida "Red" Walker
- Sofia Hublitz as Darla Walker / Darla Collier
- William Forsythe as FBI Special Agent Lawrence "Larry" Twilley
- Deborah Ann Woll as Jeanie Collier (nee. Walker)
- George Carroll as Detective Sergeant Bodie Collier
- Mark Boone Junior as Benson "Benny" Drummond
- Beau Knapp as Jason "Jay" Bird
- Nicholas Cirillo as Petey
- Ben Hall as Stewart Prince
- Bruce Davis as "Shug"
- Danny Boy O'Connor as Randall Bird
- Kadar Wesley Price as Dede
- Dash Melrose as Carter
- James Whitecloud as Chua
- Mark Ward as Lionel
- John Swab as Jerry

== Production ==
Ida Red was inspired by films such as Hardcore (1979), Cruising (1980), Thief (1981), and Heat (1995). In August 2020, it was announced that Frank Grillo, Melissa Leo, Josh Hartnett, and William Forsythe were set to star in the film, with John Swab directing from his screenplay. It was produced by Jeremy M. Rosen, Swab, and Robert Ogden Barnum for Roxwell Films, in association with Bondit Media Capital. This is the third feature collaboration between Swab and Rosen.

Principal photography took place from August to September 2020, during the COVID-19 pandemic. The film was shot in and around Tulsa, Oklahoma, with strict precautions taken on set, following Oklahoma and SAG-AFTRA COVID-19 protocols. The original music was composed by David Sardy.

== Release ==
Ida Red had its world premiere in the Piazza Grande section of the 74th Locarno Film Festival on August 11, 2021, and its North American premiere at the 25th Fantasia International Film Festival on August 20. Prior to that, Saban Films acquired U.S. and U.K. distribution rights to the film. It was given a limited theatrical release on November 5, 2021, and was simultaneously released on digital and on-demand.

== Critical reception ==
On the review aggregator website Rotten Tomatoes, 35% of 17 critics' reviews are positive, with an average rating of 5.2/10. Metacritic, which uses a weighted average, assigned the film a score of 46 out of 100, based on 6 critics, indicating "mixed or average" reviews.

Jay Weissberg of Variety called the film "a proficiently made crime family drama" and wrote, "Good performances and a plot that generally holds the attention could draw audiences." Weissberg also criticized, "Swab's script puts a lot of emphasis on family relations yet sloppily makes numerous leaps that remain unexplained."

Neil Young of Screen Daily described the film as "a brooding, occasionally bloody crime-thriller with noir and western undertones that is chiefly notable for a strong ensemble cast" and stated, "Swab's strong suit lies in the selection and handling of his performers."

Angie Han of The Hollywood Reporter remarked, "Everything in Ida Red is exactly what it seems to be, no less and certainly no more. […] Nothing kills excitement like endless repetition — and Ida Red turns out to be just the latest faint echo of stories we've heard too many times already."

Brandy McDonnell of The Oklahoman wrote, "Swab's vision is getting clearer. With strong performances, solid pacing and intriguing cinematic choices, the Oklahoma filmmaker's gritty new thriller Ida Red proves the evident progress Swab has been making in practicing his craft."

Glenn Kenny of RogerEbert.com gave the film 2 out of 4 stars and opined, "The big heist seems to have been staged in a ghost town. Swab wants to get to Heat but he can't get anything up to a proper temperature." Kenny also commented, "Swab has enough directorial energy to keep the proceedings watchable at the least."
