= Frank Grillo =

American actor (born 1965)

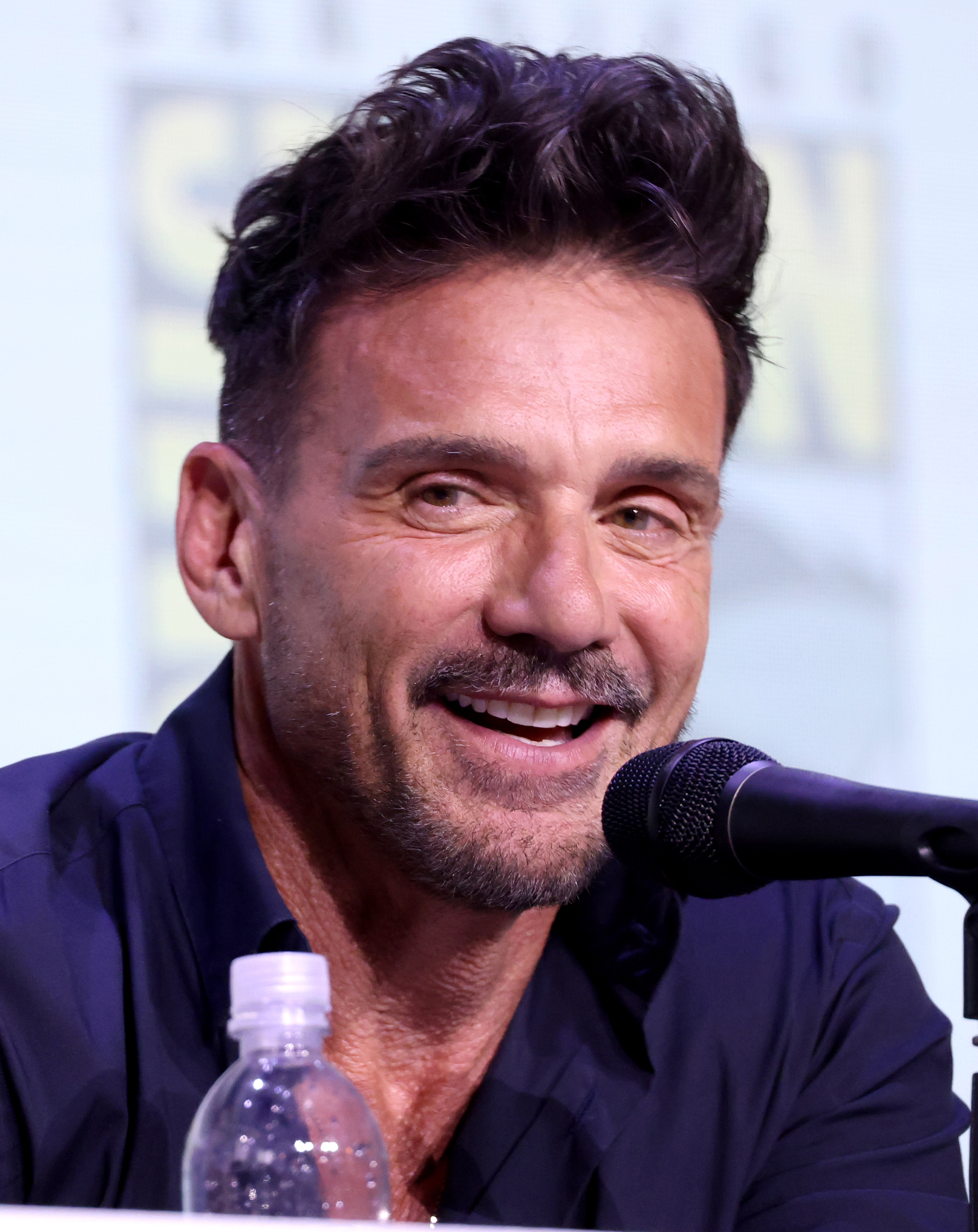
- Grillo in 2025
- Born: Frank Anthony Grillo; June 8, 1965 (age 61); New York City, New York, U.S.
- Citizenship: United States; Italy
- Education: New York University
- Occupation: Actor
- Years active: 1992–present
- Spouses: Kathy Grillo (m. 1991; div. 1998); Wendy Moniz (m. 2000; div. 2020)
- Children: 3

Frank Anthony Grillo (born June 8, 1965) is an American actor. He is known for playing Brock Rumlow / Crossbones in the superhero franchise Marvel Cinematic Universe (MCU), Sergeant Leo Barnes in The Purge franchise, and Rick Flag Sr. in the DC Universe (DCU). He has also appeared in Warrior (2011), The Grey (2011), End of Watch (2012), Zero Dark Thirty (2012), Wolf Warrior 2 and Wheelman (both 2017), and Boss Level (2020).

Grillo's television work includes the lead role in Kingdom (2014–2017) as well as recurring roles in Battery Park (2000), For the People (2002–2003), The Shield (2002–2003), Prison Break (2005–2006), Blind Justice (2005), The Kill Point (2007), Billions (2020), Tulsa King (2024), Peacemaker (2025), and Guiding Light (1996-1999).

== Early life ==
Grillo was born in New York City to a working-class Italian-American family of Calabrian origin. He was raised in the Bronx and in Rockland County, New York. Grillo began wrestling at eight years old, and took up boxing at eighteen. In 1991, he started practicing Brazilian jiu-jitsu, which he studied under Rickson Gracie; he currently holds a brown belt. Grillo graduated from New York University with a business degree and spent a year on Wall Street before being asked to do a Miller Genuine Draft beer commercial. On the podcast The Fighter and the Kid, he stated that he holds Italian citizenship.

== Career ==
=== Film ===
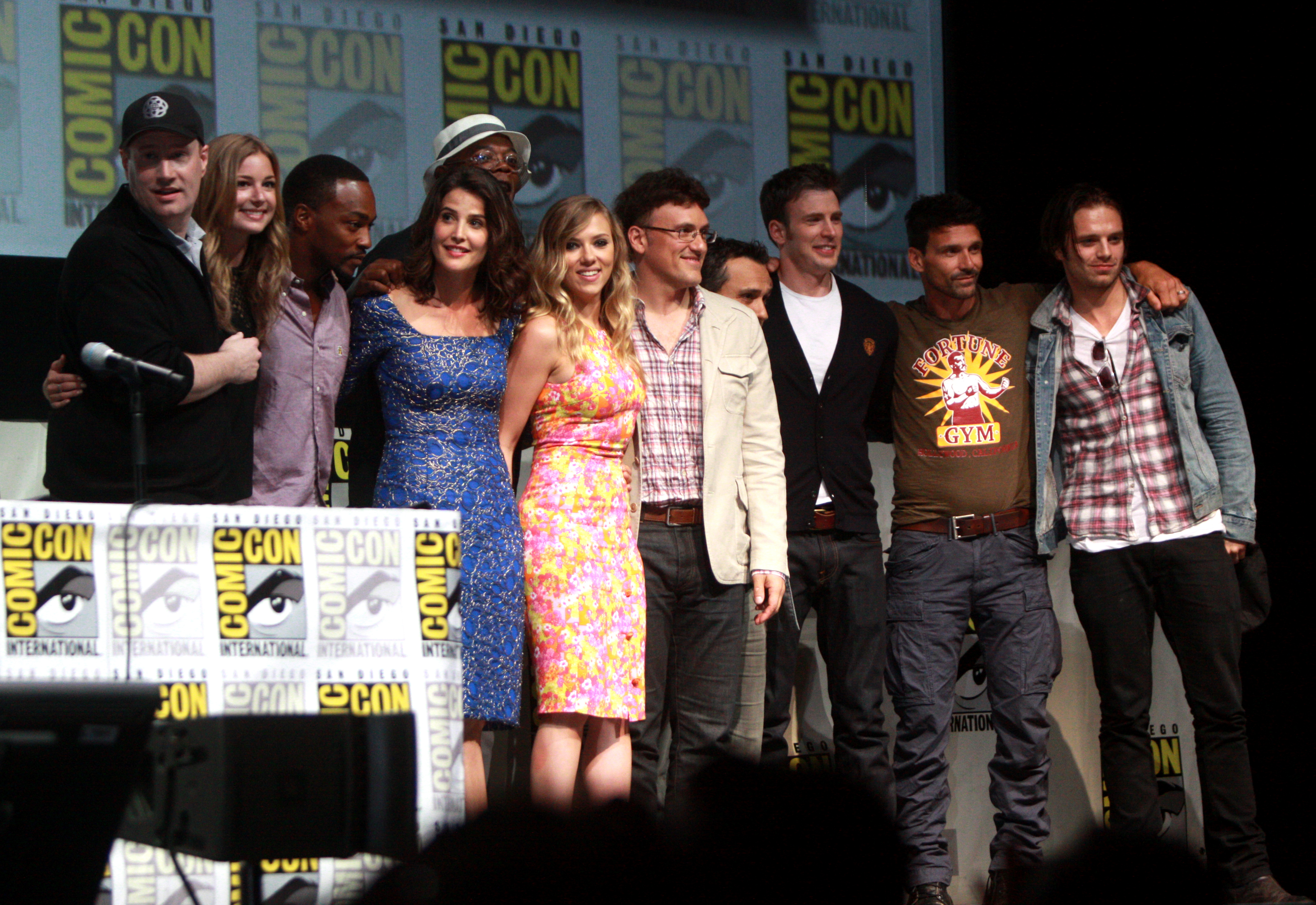
Grillo (second from right) with his co-stars from Captain America: The Winter Soldier

Grillo started his acting career by appearing in commercials, for companies such as American Express and Sure deodorant. His first film role was in 1992's The Mambo Kings, and he went on to appear in the films Minority Report (2002), April's Shower (2006), and both iMurders and New Line Cinema's Pride and Glory in 2008.

Grillo was in the 2010 horror film Mother's Day in the role of Daniel Sohapi and the following year, had a supporting role in the 2011 film Warrior as MMA trainer Frank Campana. In 2012, he played Diaz in the survival thriller The Grey with Liam Neeson and as Sarge in End of Watch with Jake Gyllenhaal. In 2013, he starred with Jaimie Alexander in the romantic thriller film Collision and had a bit role in the action film Homefront with Jason Statham.

In 2014, Grillo was cast as Hydra agent Brock Rumlow in the 2014 film Captain America: The Winter Soldier. The same year, he starred as Sergeant Leo Barnes in the sequel The Purge: Anarchy, and reprised his role in 2016's The Purge: Election Year. He also reprised the role of Brock Rumlow/Crossbones in the third installment of the Captain America film series, Civil War, which was released on May 6, 2016.

In October 2013, Grillo started filming for The Crash, starring alongside Academy Award nominee Minnie Driver, Ed Westwick, AnnaSophia Robb, Dianna Agron, John Leguizamo, Mary McCormack, Christopher McDonald and Maggie Q. The film is directed by Aram Rappaport and produced by Hilary Shor, Atit Shah, and Aaron Becker. The Crash was released on January 31, 2017.

In 2015, Grillo starred in the films Demonic and Big Sky. Another film in which he stars, Beyond Skyline, was originally set for release in 2015, and was ultimately released on Netflix in December 2017.

In 2018, Grillo starred opposite Bruce Willis and Johnathon Schaech in the action film Reprisal. Years after its release, the film made it on Netflix's U.S. top five in October 2021.

In 2019, Variety announced that Grillo has signed with Creative Artists Agency (CAA) for representation.

Grillo produced and starred in Boss Level, which was announced in November 2017 and was originally scheduled to be released by Entertainment Studios Motion Pictures on August 16, 2019, but was delayed. It was subsequently bought by Hulu, which released it on March 5, 2021. He also appeared in the sequel Hitman's Wife's Bodyguard with Ryan Reynolds and Samuel L. Jackson.

More recently, he has appeared in the films This Is the Night with Naomi Watts, Copshop with Gerard Butler, Ida Red with Melissa Leo, The Yacht with Ruby Rose and A Day to Die with Bruce Willis.

Grillo plays Ferruccio Lamborghini in the 2022 biographical drama Lamborghini: The Man Behind the Legend. The film is directed by Oscar-winning writer Bobby Moresco. The film also stars Oscar winner Mira Sorvino and Emmy nominee Gabriel Byrne.

In June 2024, set photos revealed that Grillo was set to appear in the DC Universe (DCU) film Superman as Rick Flag Sr., reprising the role in live-action after debuting as the character in the animated series Creature Commandos (2024–present).

=== Television ===
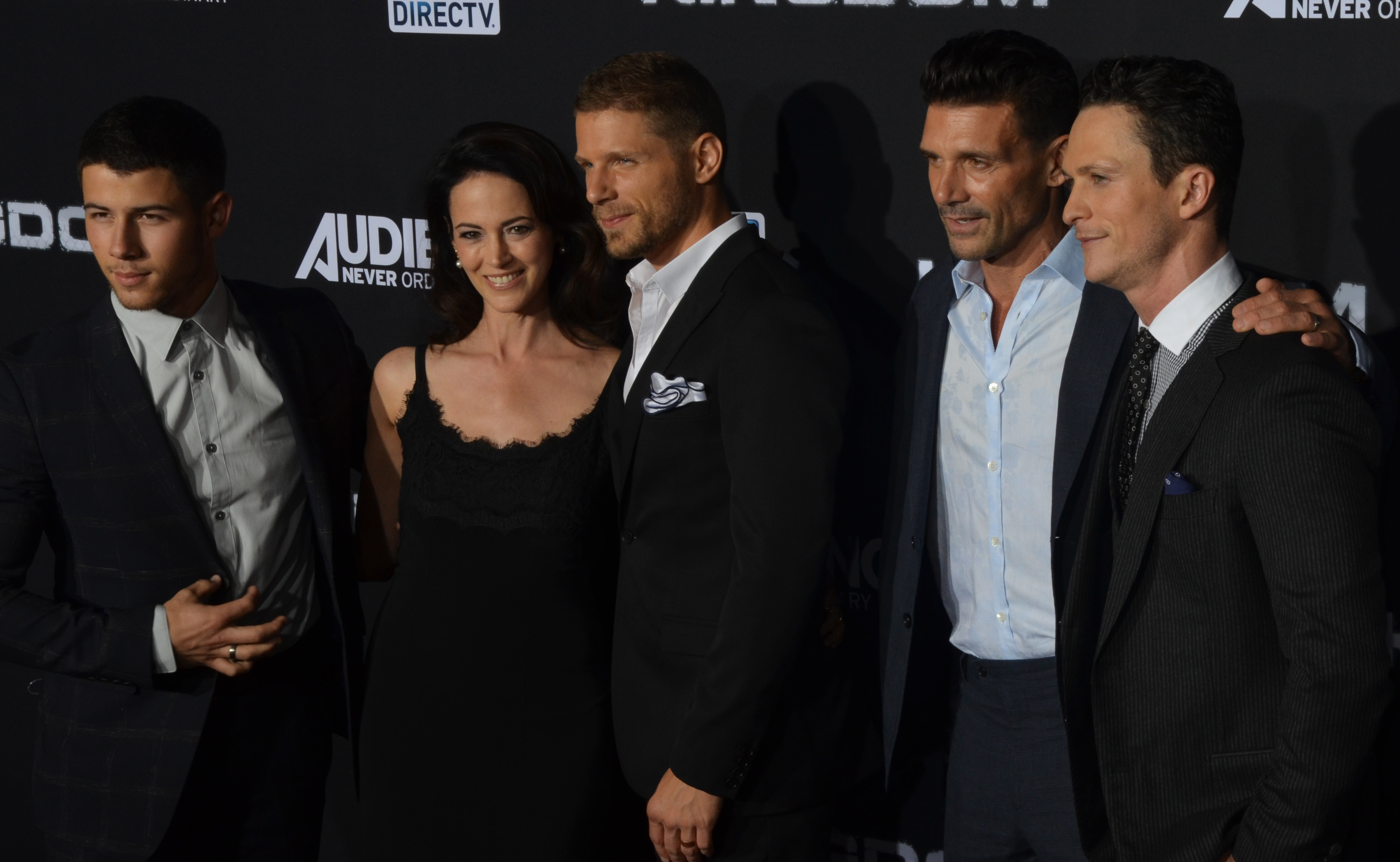
Nick Jonas, Joanna Going, Matt Lauria, Grillo and Jonathan Tucker at the premiere of the drama series Kingdom in October 2014

Grillo first appeared on television in episodes of Silk Stalkings (1993), and Poltergeist: The Legacy (1996) before being cast as businessman Hart Jessup on the daytime soap opera Guiding Light in 1996 up until 1999. In 2002, he was cast in the series For the People as Det. J.C. Hunter and played Hunter until 2003. One of his more notable television roles was on the crime drama Prison Break where he played Nick Savrinn from 2005 to 2006. During that time, he also appeared on the Blind Justice as Marty Russo.

He was in the first and only season of The Kill Point in 2007, and played the role of Jimmy in the CSI: NY episode "The Things About Heroes," which aired in November 2007. In 2010, he starred in the sci-fi series The Gates opposite Marisol Nichols and Rhona Mitra. The series only lasted one season.

Between 2014 and 2017, Grillo starred in the DirecTV drama series Kingdom as MMA coach Alvey Kulina alongside Nick Jonas and Jonathan Tucker.

Grillo was a season 5 regular on the drama series Billions, starring as artist Nico Tanner opposite Damian Lewis and Maggie Siff. He also reprised the role of Crossbones by voicing the character on the Marvel Cinematic Universe animated series What If...

In 2024, Grillo voiced Rick Flag Sr. in the Max animated series Creature Commandos, the first series and installment of the new DC Universe (DCU) franchise managed by James Gunn and Peter Safran, and a successor to the previous DC Extended Universe (DCEU). Grillo's character, who is the father of DCEU character Rick Flag Jr., is set to appear across all DCU media, and Grillo was announced in May 2024 to be reprising the role in live-action, appearing as a cast regular for the second season of Peacemaker opposite John Cena.

Grillo joined the cast of Tulsa King season 2, starring as Kansas City mob boss Bill Bevilaqua opposite Sylvester Stallone. He has also filmed season 3 and is gearing up to film season 4 in late 2025.

== Personal life ==
Grillo married his first wife, Kathy, in 1991. They had one son together, born in 1997, and divorced in 1998.

Grillo met actress Wendy Moniz in 1996 on the set of Guiding Light. They were married on October 28, 2000 and had two sons together, born in 2004 and 2008. They divorced in 2020.

== Filmography ==
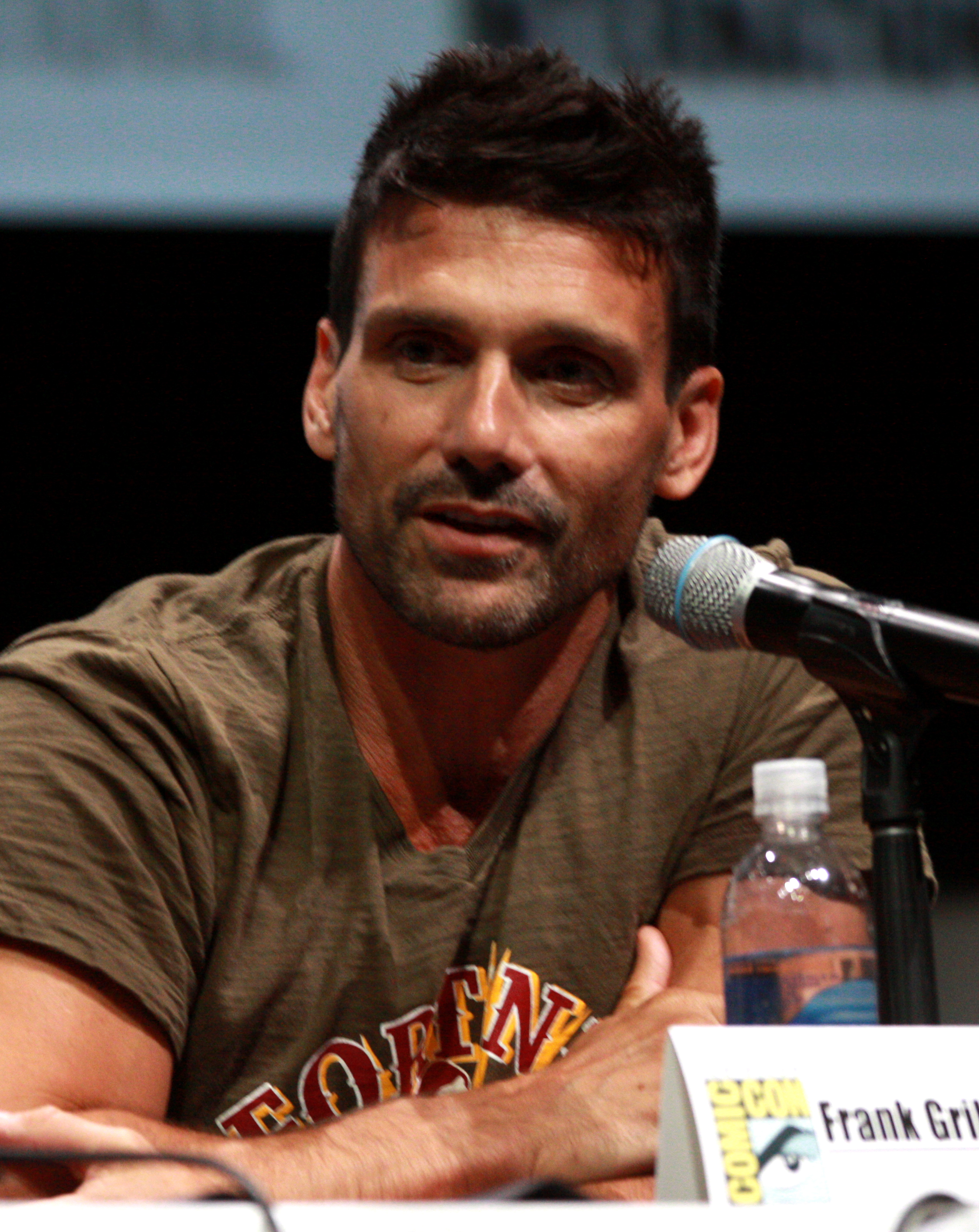
Grillo at San Diego Comic-Con in 2013

Key
†	Denotes films that have not yet been released

=== Film ===
Year	Title	Role	Notes
1992	The Mambo Kings	Machito	
1993	Deadly Rivals	Grogan	
1996	Deadly Charades	Vince Carlucci	
2002	Simplicity	General	Short film
2002	The Sweetest Thing	Andy	
2002	Minority Report	Pre-Crime Cop	
2003	April's Shower	Rocco	
2007	Raw Footage	Ben Chaffin	Short film
2008	iMurders	Joe Romano	
2008	Pride and Glory	Eddie Carbone	
2009	Blue Eyes	Bob Estevez	
2010	Edge of Darkness	Agent One	
2010	Mother's Day	Daniel Sohapi	
2010	My Soul to Take	Paterson	
2011	Warrior	Frank Campana	
2011	The Grey	John Diaz	
2012	Lay the Favorite	Frankie	
2012	End of Watch	Sergeant "Sarge" Daniels	
2012	Disconnect	Mike	
2012	Zero Dark Thirty	Red Squadron Commanding Officer	
2013	Gangster Squad	Russo	
2013	Collision	Scott Dolan	
2013	Homefront	Cyrus Hanks	
2014	Captain America: The Winter Soldier	Brock Rumlow	
2014	The Purge: Anarchy	Sgt. Leo Barnes	
2015	Demonic	Mark Lewis	
2015	Big Sky	Jesse	
2016	Captain America: Civil War	Brock Rumlow / Crossbones	
2016	The Purge: Election Year	Sgt. Leo Barnes	
2017	The Crash	Guy Clifton	
2017	Stephanie	Eric	
2017	Wolf Warrior 2	Big Daddy	
2017	Wheelman	Wheelman	
2017	Beyond Skyline	Mark Corley	
2018	Reprisal	Jacob	Direct-to-video
2018	Donnybrook	Chainsaw Angus	
2019	Avengers: Endgame	Brock Rumlow	
2019	Point Blank	Abraham "Abe" Guevara	
2019	Into the Ashes	Sloan	
2019	Black and Blue	Terry Malone	
2019	Hell on the Border	Bob Dozier	
2020	Boss Level	Roy Pulver	Also producer
2020	Jiu Jitsu	Harrigan	
2021	No Man's Land	Bill Greer	
2021	Cosmic Sin	Gen. Eron Ryle	Direct-to-video
2021	Body Brokers	Vin	
2021	Hitman's Wife's Bodyguard	Bobby O'Neill	
2021	Ida Red	Dallas Walker	
2021	The Gateway	Duke	
2021	Copshop	Teddy Murretto	Also producer
2021	This Is the Night	Vincent Dedea	
2022	Stowaway	Meeser	
2022	Shattered	Sebastian	
2022	A Day to Die	Capt. Brice Mason	Direct-to-video
2022	Paradise Highway	Dennis	
2022	Operation Seawolf	Cmdr. Race Ingram	
2022	Lamborghini: The Man Behind the Legend	Ferruccio Lamborghini	
2023	Little Dixie	Doc Alexander	
2023	The Resurrection of Charles Manson	Robert	
2023	One Day as a Lion	Pauly Russo	
2023	Black Lotus	Saban	
2023	Justice League: Warworld	Agent Faraday	Voice
2023	MR-9: Do or Die	Roman Ross	
2023	King of Killers	Jorg Drakos	
2024	Lights Out	Michael 'Duffy' Duffield	
2024	Die Alone	Kai	
2024	Long Gone Heroes	Gunner	
2024	Hounds of War	Ryder	
2024	Werewolves	Wesley Marshall	
2025	Superman	Rick Flag Sr.	
2026	Misdirection	David Blume	
2026	Kill Code	Benjamin	
2027	Man of Tomorrow †	Rick Flag Sr.	Post-production
TBA	Last Resort †		Post-production
TBA	Override †	Paxton	Post-production

=== Television ===
Year	Title	Role	Notes
1993	Silk Stalkings	Franco LaPuma	Episode: "Ladies Night Out"
1996	Poltergeist: The Legacy	Jerry Tate	Episode: "Ghost in the Road"
1996–1999	Guiding Light	Hart Jessup	Main role
1999	Wasteland	Cliff Dobbs	Recurring role
2000	Battery Park	Anthony Stigliano	Main role
2002	Hunter: Return to Justice	Detective Terence Gillette	Television film
2002–2003	For the People	Det. J.C. Hunter	Main role
2002–2003	The Shield	Officer Paul Jackson	Recurring role (Season 1–2)
2002, 2009	Law & Order: Special Victims Unit	Frank Barbarossa / Mark Van Kuren	Episode: "Deception", "Transitions"
2003	Karen Sisco	Garrison Kick	Episode: "Nostalgia"
2003	Hunter: Back in Force	Detective Terence Gillette	Television film
2004	The District	Vince Dymecki	Episode: "Breath of Life"
2005	Blind Justice	Detective Marty Russo	Main role
2005–2006	Prison Break	Nick Savrinn	Recurring role (Season 1)
2006	CSI: Crime Scene Investigation	Gary Sinclair	Episode: "Happenstance"
2006	Hollis & Rae	Henry Callaway	Television film
2007	Without a Trace	Neil Rawlings	Episode: "Tail Spin"
2007	Las Vegas	Jeremy Shapiro	Episode: "The Burning Bedouin"
2007	The Kill Point	Albert Roman / Mr. Pig	Main role
2007	CSI: NY	Jimmie Davis	Episode: "The Thing About Heroes..."
2008	The Madness of Jane	Oliver Cornbluth	Television film
2008	Blue Blood	Quarry	Television film
2010	The Gates	Nick Monohan	Main role
2011	Breakout Kings	Agent Stoltz	Episode: "Queen of Hearts"
2013	Mary and Martha	Peter	Television film
2014–2017	Kingdom	Alvey Kulina	Main role
2018	FightWorld	Himself / Host	Main host
2020	Billions	Nico Tanner	Recurring role (Season 5)
2021, 2023	What If...?	Brock Rumlow	Voice; 4 episodes
2023	Paul T. Goldman	Dan Hardwick	Recurring role
2024–present	Tulsa King	Bill Bevilaqua	Main role
2024–present	Creature Commandos	Rick Flag Sr.	Voice, main role
2025	Peacemaker	Rick Flag Sr.	Main role (Season 2)

=== Music videos ===
Year	Title	Artist	Role	Ref.
2026	"Do Me Right"	Mr. Fantasy	Himself	

== Awards and nominations ==
Year	Award	Category	Film	Result	Ref.
2013	Fangoria Chainsaw Awards	Best Supporting Actor	The Grey	Nominated	
2015	BloodGuts UK Horror Awards	Best Actor	The Purge: Anarchy	Nominated	
2022	Capri Hollywood International Film Festival	Capri Italian-American Award	Lamborghini: The Man Behind the Legend	Won	
