= Run with the Hunted (film) =

- Directed by: John Swab
- Written by: John Swab
- Produced by: Jeremy M. Rosen
- Starring: Michael Pitt; Sam Quartin; Ron Perlman; Mark Boone Junior; William Forsythe; Dree Hemingway
- Cinematography: Matt Clegg
- Edited by: Jon Greenhalgh
- Music by: Will Bates
- Production company: Roxwell Films
- Distributed by: Vertical Entertainment
- Release dates: October 3, 2019 (Woodstock Film Festival); June 26, 2020 (United States)
- Running time: 93 minutes
- Country: United States
- Language: English

Run with the Hunted is a 2019 American action crime drama film written and directed by John Swab, and starring Michael Pitt, Sam Quartin, Ron Perlman, Mark Boone Junior, William Forsythe and Dree Hemingway.

It was released in the United States on June 26, 2020 by Vertical Entertainment.

== Plot ==
A young lad Oscar, whilst defending his young friend Loux, kills her abusive father; so he flees his rural hometown. During his run, he encounters love, crime and corruption and eventually, 15 years on, finds himself the leader of a band of lost children. At the same time, Loux relocates to the same city seeking a better life. Loux finds a job with a sore-headed private investigator and stumbles on Oscar's old missing child report. She then takes it upon herself to find Oscar who had years before saved her life.

== Cast ==
- Michael Pitt as Oscar
- Sam Quartin as Loux
- Ron Perlman as Birdie
- Mark Boone Junior as Sway
- William Forsythe as Augustus
- Dree Hemingway as Peaches
- Kylie Rogers as Young Peaches
- Isiah Whitlock Jr. as Lester

== Production ==
It was screened at the Woodstock Film Festival on October 3, 2019. In April 2020, Vertical Entertainment acquired North American distribution rights to the film. It was released on June 26, 2020.

== Critical reception ==
On review aggregator website Rotten Tomatoes, the film has an approval rating of 0% based on 11 reviews, with an average rating of 3.8/10.
