= Don Lee =

Don or Donald Lee may refer to:

== Entertainment ==
- Don Lee (broadcaster) (1880–1934), American pioneer television executive in California
- Don Lee (author) (born 1959), American novelist and creative writing professor
- Haki R. Madhubuti (Don Luther Lee, born 1942), African-American author, educator, and poet
- Ma Dong-seok (Don Lee, born 1971, as Lee Dong-seok), South Korean-born American actor
- Don Lee (musician) (1941–1995), American country and rock musician and producer
- Don Lee (accordionist) (1930–2015), American accordionist who had a hit with "Echo, Echo, Echo" in 1957

== Sports ==
- Don Lee (baseball) (born 1934), pitcher in Major League Baseball
- Don Lee (American football) (born 1970s), head coach of the Belhaven College Blazers
- Donald Lee (American football) (born 1980), American football tight end
- Donald Lee (cricketer) (1933–2016), South African cricketer

== Other ==
- Don Lee (politician) (born 1960), state representative in Colorado, 1998–2006
- Donald Lee (politician), member of parliament from Eastern Cape, South Africa
- Donald J. Lee (1927–2011), U.S. federal judge
- Donald Woodward Lee (1910–1971), American philologist and professor of English

== See also ==
- Don Li (born 1982), Hong Kong singer/actor
- Don Li (composer/musician), Swiss composer
- 454326 Donlee, a minor planet and main-belt asteroid named after scientist Don Lee
- List of people with surname Li
