= Don Lee (American football) =

American football coach

Biographical details
- Born: c. 1971

Playing career
- 1990–1993: Olivet Nazarene
- Position: Defensive end

Coaching career (HC unless noted)
- 1994: Momence HS (IL) (OLB)
- 1995–1997: Middle Georgia (DE)
- 1998–2001: Southwest Baptist (DL)
- 2002: Cumberlands (KY) (LB)
- 2003–2005: Belhaven (AC)
- 2006–2008: Belhaven
- 2009–2010: Olivet Nazarene
- 2011: Concordia (AL) (AC)
- 2012: Concordia (AL) (DC)
- 2012–2013: Concordia (AL)
- 2014–2016: Virginia–Lynchburg
- 2021–2022: Cumberland (TN) (DL)
- 2023–2024: John Melvin

Head coaching record
- Overall: 23–74

Accomplishments and honors

Championships
- 1 MSC West Division (2006)

Don A. Lee (born c. 1970) is an American football coach. He served as the head football coach at Belhaven College from 2006 to 2008, Olivet Nazarene University from 2009 to 2010, Concordia College Alabama from 2012 to 2013, Virginia University of Lynchburg from 2014 to 2016, and John Melvin University from 2023 to 2024. Lee was the second African American head coach in history of the NAIA's Mid-South Conference and is a recipient of a National Football League minority coach fellowship.

== Playing career ==
Lee played defensive end at Olivet Nazarene University from 1990 until 1993, where he also earned a Bachelor of Science degree in Physical Education in 1995.

== Coaching career ==
=== Assistant coaching ===
Lee's coaching career began with Momence High School in Momence, Illinois, where he served as outside linebackers coach for the school. His next move was Middle Georgia College as the defensive ends coach from 1995 to 1997. At Middle Georgia, the defense was ranked seventh in the NJCAA in total defense during the 1995 season.

Lee entered the collegiate coaching ranks as defensive line coach at Southwest Baptist University from 1997 until 2001, and in 2002 moved to be the linebackers coach at the University of the Cumberlands in Kentucky. His next move was to become an assistant coach at Belhaven, where he would later become the head coach.

=== Belhaven ===
Lee was the head football coach at Belhaven College in Jackson, Mississippi from 2006 to 2008. He was the fourth head football coach at the school. His record at Belhaven was 13–20. The team won the Mid-South Conference West Division title in the process.

After several years as an assistant coach, Lee began his tenure at Belhaven by producing only the second winning season in the history of the school's football program in 2006.

Lee has modified the school's approach of bringing in junior college transfer students to play and is focusing on building through new recruits. He has accented that program by bolstering a junior varsity schedule which encourages incoming freshmen to choose Belhaven through the desire of more playing time. In 2007, his team Belhaven, produced a 5–6 overall record and averaged 33.7 points and allowed 37.3 per game. His challenges in the 2008 season include overcoming being outscored in the fourth quarter of play and overcoming a four win losing streak to begin the season.

=== Olivet Nazarene ===
In December 2008, Lee was hired to serve as head coach of his alma mater Olivet Nazarene in Bourbonnais, Illinois. He resigned after only two seasons in November 2010 and cited family and personal reasons for the resignation. During his two year stint as head coach, Lee led the Tigers to a record of 2–20. Prior to his resignation, Lee notoriously skipped football practice to rake leaves at his home.

=== Concordia College Alabama ===
From Olivet Nazarene, Lee took an assistant position with Concordia College Alabama. In his first season, the Hornets finished the 2011 season with a 6–5 record, and won their last game against the Division II Stillman. Concordia opened their 2012 season with a 20–19 upset victory over Mississippi Valley State of the Division I FCS. Lee was elevated to head coach of the Hornets after the third game of the 2012 season.

== Head coaching record ==
Year	Team	Overall	Conference	Standing	Bowl/playoffs
Belhaven Blazers (Mid-South Conference) (2006–2008)
2006	Belhaven	7–4	5–0	1st (West)	
2007	Belhaven	5–6	3–2	T–2nd (West)	
2008	Belhaven	2–9	1–4	5th (West)	
Belhaven:		14–19	9–6		
Olivet Nazarene Tigers (Mid-States Football Association) (2009–2010)
2009	Olivet Nazarene	2–9	1–6	7th (MEL)	
2010	Olivet Nazarene	0–11	0–7	8th (MEL)	
Olivet Nazarene:		2–20	1–13		
Concordia Hornets (NAIA independent) (2012–present)
2012	Concordia	3–3			
2013	Concordia	1–9			
Concordia:		4–12			
Virginia–Lynchburg Dragons (Independent) (2014–2016)
2014	Virginia–Lynchburg	0–8			
2015	Virginia–Lynchburg	1–6			
Virginia–Lynchburg:		1–14			
John Melvin Millers (Independent) (2023–2024)
2023	John Melvin	2–5			
2024	John Melvin	0–4			
John Melvin:		2–9			
Total:		23–74			
