= List of minor planets: 454001–455000 =

The following is a partial list of minor planets, running from minor-planet number 454001 through 455000, inclusive. The primary data for this and other partial lists is based on JPL's "Small-Body Orbital Elements" and data available from the Minor Planet Center. Critical list information is also provided by the MPC, unless otherwise specified from Lowell Observatory. A detailed description of the table's columns and additional sources are given on the main page including a complete list of every page in this series, and a statistical break-up on the dynamical classification of minor planets.

Also see the summary list of all named bodies in numerical and alphabetical order, and the corresponding naming citations for the number range of this particular list. New namings may only be added to this list after official publication, as the preannouncement of names is condemned by the Working Group for Small Bodies Nomenclature of the International Astronomical Union.

Near-Earth obj.	MBA (inner)	MBA (outer)	Centaur
Mars-crosser	MBA (middle)	Jupiter trojan	Trans-Neptunian obj.
Unclassified

== 454001–454100 ==
Designation			Discovery			Properties		Ref
Permanent	Provisional	Named after	Date	Site	Discoverer(s)	Category	Diam.	Ref
454001	2012 DT_{5}	—	October 12, 2010	Mount Lemmon	Mount Lemmon Survey	·	1.5 km	MPC · JPL
454002	2012 DU_{5}	—	September 26, 2009	Mount Lemmon	Mount Lemmon Survey	·	2.3 km	MPC · JPL
454003	2012 DH_{7}	—	March 16, 2008	Kitt Peak	Spacewatch	MAR	1.2 km	MPC · JPL
454004	2012 DD_{19}	—	April 11, 2008	Mount Lemmon	Mount Lemmon Survey	·	1.3 km	MPC · JPL
454005	2012 DC_{24}	—	September 25, 2005	Kitt Peak	Spacewatch	·	2.2 km	MPC · JPL
454006	2012 DD_{32}	—	October 21, 2009	Mount Lemmon	Mount Lemmon Survey	·	2.9 km	MPC · JPL
454007	2012 DQ_{33}	—	February 8, 2007	Kitt Peak	Spacewatch	·	1.8 km	MPC · JPL
454008	2012 DB_{34}	—	January 19, 2012	Haleakala	Pan-STARRS 1	·	1.7 km	MPC · JPL
454009	2012 DF_{35}	—	September 14, 2006	Kitt Peak	Spacewatch	·	1.1 km	MPC · JPL
454010	2012 DL_{36}	—	February 8, 2007	Mount Lemmon	Mount Lemmon Survey	·	1.7 km	MPC · JPL
454011	2012 DX_{39}	—	November 23, 2006	Kitt Peak	Spacewatch	·	1.0 km	MPC · JPL
454012	2012 DW_{40}	—	December 21, 2006	Mount Lemmon	Mount Lemmon Survey	AGN	1.0 km	MPC · JPL
454013	2012 DZ_{41}	—	November 13, 2010	Mount Lemmon	Mount Lemmon Survey	·	1.6 km	MPC · JPL
454014	2012 DO_{44}	—	September 20, 2009	Mount Lemmon	Mount Lemmon Survey	·	3.0 km	MPC · JPL
454015	2012 DA_{45}	—	September 28, 2009	Kitt Peak	Spacewatch	·	3.3 km	MPC · JPL
454016	2012 DG_{45}	—	February 25, 2012	Kitt Peak	Spacewatch	·	1.7 km	MPC · JPL
454017	2012 DW_{53}	—	September 18, 2010	Mount Lemmon	Mount Lemmon Survey	·	2.3 km	MPC · JPL
454018	2012 DO_{61}	—	January 29, 2012	Kitt Peak	Spacewatch	·	2.9 km	MPC · JPL
454019	2012 DC_{63}	—	August 15, 2009	Kitt Peak	Spacewatch	EOS	1.6 km	MPC · JPL
454020	2012 DM_{68}	—	September 16, 2010	Kitt Peak	Spacewatch	GEF	1.0 km	MPC · JPL
454021	2012 DX_{68}	—	March 30, 2008	Kitt Peak	Spacewatch	·	1.2 km	MPC · JPL
454022	2012 DK_{69}	—	June 20, 2010	Mount Lemmon	Mount Lemmon Survey	·	1.8 km	MPC · JPL
454023	2012 DD_{73}	—	December 21, 2006	Kitt Peak	Spacewatch	·	1.9 km	MPC · JPL
454024	2012 DX_{88}	—	March 13, 2008	Catalina	CSS	·	3.0 km	MPC · JPL
454025	2012 DP_{90}	—	January 29, 2012	Kitt Peak	Spacewatch	BRA	1.2 km	MPC · JPL
454026	2012 DB_{97}	—	November 30, 2005	Mount Lemmon	Mount Lemmon Survey	·	2.8 km	MPC · JPL
454027	2012 DY_{97}	—	November 9, 1999	Kitt Peak	Spacewatch	·	3.0 km	MPC · JPL
454028	2012 EE_{8}	—	October 12, 2006	Kitt Peak	Spacewatch	·	1.6 km	MPC · JPL
454029	2012 EU_{16}	—	January 23, 2006	Kitt Peak	Spacewatch	·	3.1 km	MPC · JPL
454030	2012 FE_{14}	—	February 6, 2002	Socorro	LINEAR	·	2.2 km	MPC · JPL
454031	2012 FS_{17}	—	March 17, 2012	Mount Lemmon	Mount Lemmon Survey	·	2.4 km	MPC · JPL
454032	2012 FG_{25}	—	March 16, 2012	Kitt Peak	Spacewatch	EOS	1.5 km	MPC · JPL
454033	2012 FH_{26}	—	August 18, 2009	Kitt Peak	Spacewatch	·	2.7 km	MPC · JPL
454034	2012 FD_{31}	—	March 31, 2001	Kitt Peak	Spacewatch	·	2.7 km	MPC · JPL
454035	2012 FB_{32}	—	March 2, 2012	Mount Lemmon	Mount Lemmon Survey	·	2.9 km	MPC · JPL
454036	2012 FT_{32}	—	January 9, 2006	Kitt Peak	Spacewatch	·	2.3 km	MPC · JPL
454037	2012 FQ_{36}	—	February 29, 2012	Kitt Peak	Spacewatch	·	2.0 km	MPC · JPL
454038	2012 FW_{36}	—	September 17, 2009	Kitt Peak	Spacewatch	VER	2.6 km	MPC · JPL
454039	2012 FX_{46}	—	February 4, 2006	Kitt Peak	Spacewatch	THM	2.0 km	MPC · JPL
454040	2012 FE_{48}	—	October 1, 2009	Mount Lemmon	Mount Lemmon Survey	·	2.4 km	MPC · JPL
454041	2012 FS_{49}	—	December 4, 2005	Kitt Peak	Spacewatch	·	1.8 km	MPC · JPL
454042	2012 FO_{53}	—	February 20, 2012	Catalina	CSS	·	3.1 km	MPC · JPL
454043	2012 FS_{72}	—	March 14, 2012	Catalina	CSS	·	1.7 km	MPC · JPL
454044	2012 GC_{3}	—	February 26, 2012	Mount Lemmon	Mount Lemmon Survey	·	1.4 km	MPC · JPL
454045	2012 GW_{4}	—	May 14, 2008	Mount Lemmon	Mount Lemmon Survey	·	1.5 km	MPC · JPL
454046	2012 GY_{6}	—	October 27, 2005	Kitt Peak	Spacewatch	·	2.3 km	MPC · JPL
454047	2012 GA_{20}	—	March 28, 2012	Kitt Peak	Spacewatch	·	2.9 km	MPC · JPL
454048	2012 GE_{24}	—	June 10, 2007	Kitt Peak	Spacewatch	·	2.5 km	MPC · JPL
454049	2012 GU_{27}	—	December 19, 2004	Mount Lemmon	Mount Lemmon Survey	·	3.2 km	MPC · JPL
454050	2012 GB_{28}	—	February 6, 2006	Kitt Peak	Spacewatch	·	2.6 km	MPC · JPL
454051	2012 GY_{38}	—	January 28, 2011	Mount Lemmon	Mount Lemmon Survey	·	2.8 km	MPC · JPL
454052	2012 HE_{13}	—	February 20, 2006	Socorro	LINEAR	·	2.5 km	MPC · JPL
454053	2012 HP_{26}	—	October 22, 2009	Mount Lemmon	Mount Lemmon Survey	·	3.1 km	MPC · JPL
454054	2012 HY_{27}	—	March 28, 2012	Kitt Peak	Spacewatch	·	2.3 km	MPC · JPL
454055	2012 HX_{53}	—	September 9, 2008	Mount Lemmon	Mount Lemmon Survey	·	3.2 km	MPC · JPL
454056	2012 HE_{70}	—	February 24, 2006	Catalina	CSS	·	3.6 km	MPC · JPL
454057	2012 HS_{82}	—	March 3, 2006	Catalina	CSS	·	6.5 km	MPC · JPL
454058	2012 JM_{15}	—	October 22, 2009	Mount Lemmon	Mount Lemmon Survey	·	2.6 km	MPC · JPL
454059	2012 JJ_{20}	—	February 24, 2006	Kitt Peak	Spacewatch	·	2.5 km	MPC · JPL
454060	2012 JX_{23}	—	April 29, 2006	Siding Spring	SSS	T_{j} (2.97)	3.5 km	MPC · JPL
454061	2012 JD_{25}	—	April 21, 2012	Mount Lemmon	Mount Lemmon Survey	·	2.5 km	MPC · JPL
454062	2012 JS_{39}	—	April 7, 2006	Kitt Peak	Spacewatch	·	2.8 km	MPC · JPL
454063	2012 JY_{60}	—	November 20, 2009	Kitt Peak	Spacewatch	·	2.8 km	MPC · JPL
454064	2012 KF_{19}	—	October 1, 2005	Mount Lemmon	Mount Lemmon Survey	·	1.6 km	MPC · JPL
454065	2012 KA_{27}	—	April 20, 2012	Mount Lemmon	Mount Lemmon Survey	·	2.8 km	MPC · JPL
454066	2012 KG_{35}	—	March 15, 2012	Kitt Peak	Spacewatch	·	3.8 km	MPC · JPL
454067	2012 KZ_{49}	—	November 20, 2009	Mount Lemmon	Mount Lemmon Survey	EMA	3.1 km	MPC · JPL
454068	2012 LZ_{20}	—	April 19, 2004	Socorro	LINEAR	H	510 m	MPC · JPL
454069	2012 OX_{2}	—	December 23, 2000	Kitt Peak	Spacewatch	H	480 m	MPC · JPL
454070	2012 SH_{65}	—	September 11, 2004	Kitt Peak	Spacewatch	3:2	5.5 km	MPC · JPL
454071	2012 TH_{20}	—	March 3, 2005	Kitt Peak	Spacewatch	·	830 m	MPC · JPL
454072	2012 TU_{30}	—	April 28, 1998	Kitt Peak	Spacewatch	H	580 m	MPC · JPL
454073	2012 TL_{52}	—	March 12, 2007	Kitt Peak	Spacewatch	L5	8.5 km	MPC · JPL
454074	2012 UB_{135}	—	October 16, 2004	Socorro	LINEAR	H	620 m	MPC · JPL
454075	2012 UJ_{153}	—	October 24, 2009	Kitt Peak	Spacewatch	·	950 m	MPC · JPL
454076	2012 UE_{174}	—	March 13, 2011	Siding Spring	SSS	H	710 m	MPC · JPL
454077	2012 VP_{7}	—	November 10, 2004	Catalina	CSS	H	730 m	MPC · JPL
454078	2012 VV_{93}	—	November 13, 2012	Mount Lemmon	Mount Lemmon Survey	AMO +1km	3.0 km	MPC · JPL
454079	2012 WF_{24}	—	March 13, 2007	Mount Lemmon	Mount Lemmon Survey	·	760 m	MPC · JPL
454080	2012 XZ_{112}	—	November 26, 2012	Mount Lemmon	Mount Lemmon Survey	·	880 m	MPC · JPL
454081	2013 AM_{36}	—	December 22, 2008	Mount Lemmon	Mount Lemmon Survey	CLA	2.2 km	MPC · JPL
454082	2013 AC_{58}	—	September 22, 2008	Mount Lemmon	Mount Lemmon Survey	·	770 m	MPC · JPL
454083	2013 AB_{59}	—	September 5, 2008	Kitt Peak	Spacewatch	·	600 m	MPC · JPL
454084	2013 AC_{68}	—	March 14, 2007	Mount Lemmon	Mount Lemmon Survey	·	710 m	MPC · JPL
454085	2013 AX_{101}	—	October 25, 2005	Catalina	CSS	·	1.0 km	MPC · JPL
454086	2013 AH_{111}	—	November 22, 2008	Kitt Peak	Spacewatch	·	1.5 km	MPC · JPL
454087	2013 AJ_{122}	—	January 12, 2010	Kitt Peak	Spacewatch	·	1.1 km	MPC · JPL
454088	2013 AN_{150}	—	December 9, 2012	Kitt Peak	Spacewatch	EUN	1.2 km	MPC · JPL
454089	2013 AB_{170}	—	September 10, 2004	Kitt Peak	Spacewatch	·	800 m	MPC · JPL
454090	2013 BJ_{8}	—	September 7, 2008	Mount Lemmon	Mount Lemmon Survey	·	610 m	MPC · JPL
454091	2013 BS_{25}	—	December 5, 2008	Kitt Peak	Spacewatch	·	900 m	MPC · JPL
454092	2013 BX_{34}	—	June 9, 2007	Kitt Peak	Spacewatch	·	660 m	MPC · JPL
454093	2013 BL_{44}	—	October 12, 2007	Mount Lemmon	Mount Lemmon Survey	·	2.8 km	MPC · JPL
454094	2013 BZ_{45}	—	January 19, 2013	Mount Lemmon	Mount Lemmon Survey	APO · PHA · fast?	170 m	MPC · JPL
454095	2013 BW_{50}	—	September 2, 2008	Kitt Peak	Spacewatch	(2076)	630 m	MPC · JPL
454096	2013 BR_{55}	—	October 10, 2008	Mount Lemmon	Mount Lemmon Survey	·	850 m	MPC · JPL
454097	2013 BX_{61}	—	November 22, 2005	Kitt Peak	Spacewatch	·	590 m	MPC · JPL
454098	2013 BG_{65}	—	January 10, 2013	Kitt Peak	Spacewatch	·	1.1 km	MPC · JPL
454099	2013 BV_{67}	—	February 1, 2006	Kitt Peak	Spacewatch	·	1.4 km	MPC · JPL
454100	2013 BO_{73}	—	January 22, 2013	Mount Lemmon	Mount Lemmon Survey	APO · PHA · fast?	550 m	MPC · JPL

== 454101–454200 ==
back to top

Designation			Discovery			Properties		Ref
Permanent	Provisional	Named after	Date	Site	Discoverer(s)	Category	Diam.	Ref
454101	2013 BP_{73}	—	January 22, 2013	Mount Lemmon	Mount Lemmon Survey	APO · PHA	290 m	MPC · JPL
454102	2013 BM_{80}	—	November 9, 2008	Mount Lemmon	Mount Lemmon Survey	·	790 m	MPC · JPL
454103	2013 CZ_{3}	—	March 23, 2003	Kitt Peak	Spacewatch	(2076)	680 m	MPC · JPL
454104	2013 CF_{6}	—	December 30, 2005	Kitt Peak	Spacewatch	·	820 m	MPC · JPL
454105	2013 CT_{8}	—	June 28, 2011	Mount Lemmon	Mount Lemmon Survey	·	1.2 km	MPC · JPL
454106	2013 CR_{10}	—	October 1, 2008	Catalina	CSS	·	880 m	MPC · JPL
454107	2013 CE_{12}	—	September 4, 2008	Kitt Peak	Spacewatch	·	680 m	MPC · JPL
454108	2013 CE_{14}	—	December 4, 2005	Mount Lemmon	Mount Lemmon Survey	·	630 m	MPC · JPL
454109	2013 CT_{30}	—	December 7, 2005	Kitt Peak	Spacewatch	·	740 m	MPC · JPL
454110	2013 CR_{68}	—	December 3, 2007	Kitt Peak	Spacewatch	·	2.2 km	MPC · JPL
454111	2013 CP_{71}	—	September 24, 2008	Kitt Peak	Spacewatch	(1338) (FLO)	490 m	MPC · JPL
454112	2013 CA_{76}	—	December 2, 2005	Mount Lemmon	Mount Lemmon Survey	·	790 m	MPC · JPL
454113	2013 CR_{77}	—	February 7, 2013	Kitt Peak	Spacewatch	·	1.1 km	MPC · JPL
454114	2013 CE_{79}	—	October 28, 2005	Mount Lemmon	Mount Lemmon Survey	·	590 m	MPC · JPL
454115	2013 CH_{84}	—	November 1, 2008	Mount Lemmon	Mount Lemmon Survey	·	620 m	MPC · JPL
454116	2013 CM_{84}	—	February 5, 2013	Kitt Peak	Spacewatch	NYS	860 m	MPC · JPL
454117	2013 CM_{86}	—	January 19, 2002	Kitt Peak	Spacewatch	NYS	880 m	MPC · JPL
454118	2013 CV_{89}	—	February 6, 2013	Kitt Peak	Spacewatch	V	730 m	MPC · JPL
454119	2013 CF_{97}	—	September 21, 2008	Kitt Peak	Spacewatch	·	650 m	MPC · JPL
454120	2013 CS_{117}	—	February 12, 2008	Mount Lemmon	Mount Lemmon Survey	·	2.4 km	MPC · JPL
454121	2013 CE_{119}	—	December 18, 2001	Socorro	LINEAR	·	740 m	MPC · JPL
454122	2013 CZ_{142}	—	October 26, 2008	Kitt Peak	Spacewatch	·	840 m	MPC · JPL
454123	2013 CW_{143}	—	February 5, 2013	Kitt Peak	Spacewatch	·	2.0 km	MPC · JPL
454124	2013 CM_{153}	—	December 21, 2008	Mount Lemmon	Mount Lemmon Survey	·	1.1 km	MPC · JPL
454125	2013 CC_{157}	—	January 28, 2006	Kitt Peak	Spacewatch	·	520 m	MPC · JPL
454126	2013 CH_{162}	—	September 24, 2000	Socorro	LINEAR	·	1.4 km	MPC · JPL
454127	2013 CD_{165}	—	April 24, 2006	Kitt Peak	Spacewatch	·	820 m	MPC · JPL
454128	2013 CP_{165}	—	February 2, 2009	Mount Lemmon	Mount Lemmon Survey	·	1.1 km	MPC · JPL
454129	2013 CZ_{165}	—	January 19, 2013	Mount Lemmon	Mount Lemmon Survey	·	990 m	MPC · JPL
454130	2013 CR_{175}	—	January 16, 2009	Mount Lemmon	Mount Lemmon Survey	·	920 m	MPC · JPL
454131	2013 CN_{181}	—	April 20, 2006	Mount Lemmon	Mount Lemmon Survey	NYS	1.1 km	MPC · JPL
454132	2013 CV_{185}	—	March 8, 2000	Kitt Peak	Spacewatch	·	500 m	MPC · JPL
454133	2013 CC_{188}	—	November 6, 2008	Mount Lemmon	Mount Lemmon Survey	·	580 m	MPC · JPL
454134	2013 CR_{188}	—	January 19, 2013	Kitt Peak	Spacewatch	·	760 m	MPC · JPL
454135	2013 CN_{192}	—	April 18, 2006	Kitt Peak	Spacewatch	MAS	670 m	MPC · JPL
454136	2013 CZ_{198}	—	February 2, 2006	Kitt Peak	Spacewatch	·	530 m	MPC · JPL
454137	2013 CO_{201}	—	February 19, 2010	Mount Lemmon	Mount Lemmon Survey	·	610 m	MPC · JPL
454138	2013 DC_{2}	—	March 13, 2002	Kitt Peak	Spacewatch	·	980 m	MPC · JPL
454139	2013 DA_{11}	—	September 12, 2007	Mount Lemmon	Mount Lemmon Survey	NYS	1.1 km	MPC · JPL
454140	2013 DV_{12}	—	April 22, 2010	WISE	WISE	(13314)	2.5 km	MPC · JPL
454141	2013 EF_{4}	—	September 21, 2011	Kitt Peak	Spacewatch	·	1.5 km	MPC · JPL
454142	2013 EL_{4}	—	February 6, 2006	Mount Lemmon	Mount Lemmon Survey	·	800 m	MPC · JPL
454143	2013 EW_{17}	—	January 17, 2013	Mount Lemmon	Mount Lemmon Survey	·	560 m	MPC · JPL
454144	2013 EH_{30}	—	August 14, 2010	Kitt Peak	Spacewatch	·	1.9 km	MPC · JPL
454145	2013 EB_{33}	—	October 22, 2006	Kitt Peak	Spacewatch	·	2.2 km	MPC · JPL
454146	2013 EX_{35}	—	January 17, 2013	Kitt Peak	Spacewatch	·	1.1 km	MPC · JPL
454147	2013 EU_{45}	—	August 21, 2006	Kitt Peak	Spacewatch	·	1.6 km	MPC · JPL
454148	2013 EE_{51}	—	December 19, 2004	Mount Lemmon	Mount Lemmon Survey	·	1.0 km	MPC · JPL
454149	2013 EY_{51}	—	January 23, 2006	Kitt Peak	Spacewatch	·	510 m	MPC · JPL
454150	2013 EK_{57}	—	August 19, 2006	Kitt Peak	Spacewatch	·	1.3 km	MPC · JPL
454151	2013 EV_{68}	—	March 7, 2013	Kitt Peak	Spacewatch	·	1.7 km	MPC · JPL
454152	2013 EG_{76}	—	January 21, 2006	Mount Lemmon	Mount Lemmon Survey	·	770 m	MPC · JPL
454153	2013 EM_{79}	—	November 11, 2006	Mount Lemmon	Mount Lemmon Survey	KOR	1.3 km	MPC · JPL
454154	2013 EK_{87}	—	June 25, 2010	WISE	WISE	·	1.6 km	MPC · JPL
454155	2013 EK_{92}	—	May 10, 2005	Kitt Peak	Spacewatch	·	1.3 km	MPC · JPL
454156	2013 EF_{94}	—	October 1, 2008	Kitt Peak	Spacewatch	·	620 m	MPC · JPL
454157	2013 EL_{101}	—	July 27, 2009	Catalina	CSS	·	4.2 km	MPC · JPL
454158	2013 ET_{102}	—	September 18, 2007	Kitt Peak	Spacewatch	·	1.4 km	MPC · JPL
454159	2013 EO_{111}	—	May 24, 2006	Mount Lemmon	Mount Lemmon Survey	·	1.0 km	MPC · JPL
454160	2013 EZ_{118}	—	April 17, 1999	Kitt Peak	Spacewatch	·	980 m	MPC · JPL
454161	2013 EL_{119}	—	March 2, 2008	Mount Lemmon	Mount Lemmon Survey	·	2.7 km	MPC · JPL
454162	2013 EN_{123}	—	October 17, 2009	Mount Lemmon	Mount Lemmon Survey	LIX	3.7 km	MPC · JPL
454163	2013 FF_{4}	—	September 26, 2011	Kitt Peak	Spacewatch	·	1.0 km	MPC · JPL
454164	2013 FU_{11}	—	April 10, 2002	Socorro	LINEAR	·	1.2 km	MPC · JPL
454165	2013 FX_{12}	—	April 4, 2005	Catalina	CSS	·	1.5 km	MPC · JPL
454166	2013 FM_{14}	—	April 21, 2006	Kitt Peak	Spacewatch	·	820 m	MPC · JPL
454167	2013 FX_{14}	—	November 6, 2010	Mount Lemmon	Mount Lemmon Survey	·	2.1 km	MPC · JPL
454168	2013 FU_{15}	—	March 12, 2013	Mount Lemmon	Mount Lemmon Survey	·	1.9 km	MPC · JPL
454169	2013 FS_{18}	—	May 15, 2008	Mount Lemmon	Mount Lemmon Survey	·	3.3 km	MPC · JPL
454170	2013 FT_{18}	—	November 10, 2010	Mount Lemmon	Mount Lemmon Survey	·	3.2 km	MPC · JPL
454171	2013 FJ_{19}	—	March 18, 2013	Kitt Peak	Spacewatch	·	1.6 km	MPC · JPL
454172	2013 GL_{1}	—	August 20, 2003	Campo Imperatore	CINEOS	HYG	2.9 km	MPC · JPL
454173	2013 GE_{11}	—	November 19, 2008	Mount Lemmon	Mount Lemmon Survey	·	850 m	MPC · JPL
454174	2013 GP_{21}	—	February 17, 2013	Kitt Peak	Spacewatch	V	530 m	MPC · JPL
454175	2013 GX_{21}	—	March 31, 2009	Kitt Peak	Spacewatch	·	1.7 km	MPC · JPL
454176	2013 GC_{24}	—	September 13, 2007	Kitt Peak	Spacewatch	V	540 m	MPC · JPL
454177	2013 GJ_{35}	—	August 23, 2011	Haleakala	Pan-STARRS 1	AMO +1km	2.3 km	MPC · JPL
454178	2013 GJ_{37}	—	January 19, 2009	Mount Lemmon	Mount Lemmon Survey	·	1.2 km	MPC · JPL
454179	2013 GD_{38}	—	November 23, 2008	Mount Lemmon	Mount Lemmon Survey	MAS	660 m	MPC · JPL
454180	2013 GU_{45}	—	June 1, 2009	Catalina	CSS	·	1.4 km	MPC · JPL
454181	2013 GD_{53}	—	September 30, 2010	Mount Lemmon	Mount Lemmon Survey	·	1.3 km	MPC · JPL
454182	2013 GP_{53}	—	September 19, 2006	Kitt Peak	Spacewatch	·	1.9 km	MPC · JPL
454183	2013 GZ_{53}	—	March 19, 2009	Mount Lemmon	Mount Lemmon Survey	·	1.1 km	MPC · JPL
454184	2013 GP_{56}	—	December 3, 2008	Mount Lemmon	Mount Lemmon Survey	·	980 m	MPC · JPL
454185	2013 GB_{76}	—	December 21, 2008	Mount Lemmon	Mount Lemmon Survey	MAS	560 m	MPC · JPL
454186	2013 GJ_{76}	—	January 16, 2008	Mount Lemmon	Mount Lemmon Survey	·	2.4 km	MPC · JPL
454187	2013 GW_{81}	—	March 3, 2008	Catalina	CSS	·	2.6 km	MPC · JPL
454188	2013 GN_{82}	—	May 8, 2006	Mount Lemmon	Mount Lemmon Survey	V	780 m	MPC · JPL
454189	2013 GR_{86}	—	November 17, 2007	Mount Lemmon	Mount Lemmon Survey	EUN	1.2 km	MPC · JPL
454190	2013 GY_{90}	—	March 14, 2013	Catalina	CSS	·	1.2 km	MPC · JPL
454191	2013 GC_{96}	—	September 11, 2007	Mount Lemmon	Mount Lemmon Survey	PHO	880 m	MPC · JPL
454192	2013 GX_{100}	—	May 1, 2009	Kitt Peak	Spacewatch	·	1.4 km	MPC · JPL
454193	2013 GZ_{101}	—	March 18, 2004	Kitt Peak	Spacewatch	LEO	1.9 km	MPC · JPL
454194	2013 GV_{102}	—	March 1, 2009	Kitt Peak	Spacewatch	NYS	1.0 km	MPC · JPL
454195	2013 GK_{104}	—	March 13, 2013	Catalina	CSS	·	1.2 km	MPC · JPL
454196	2013 GC_{106}	—	February 4, 2005	Kitt Peak	Spacewatch	MAS	640 m	MPC · JPL
454197	2013 GU_{109}	—	November 6, 2010	Mount Lemmon	Mount Lemmon Survey	EUN	1.3 km	MPC · JPL
454198	2013 GZ_{112}	—	February 29, 2004	Kitt Peak	Spacewatch	·	1.8 km	MPC · JPL
454199	2013 GC_{126}	—	June 3, 2008	Kitt Peak	Spacewatch	·	2.2 km	MPC · JPL
454200	2013 GN_{131}	—	March 11, 2013	Catalina	CSS	·	2.0 km	MPC · JPL

== 454201–454300 ==
back to top

Designation			Discovery			Properties		Ref
Permanent	Provisional	Named after	Date	Site	Discoverer(s)	Category	Diam.	Ref
454201	2013 HO_{12}	—	February 16, 2013	Mount Lemmon	Mount Lemmon Survey	·	1.5 km	MPC · JPL
454202	2013 HV_{13}	—	September 20, 2009	Mount Lemmon	Mount Lemmon Survey	·	4.1 km	MPC · JPL
454203	2013 HY_{16}	—	April 20, 2013	Siding Spring	SSS	·	1.5 km	MPC · JPL
454204	2013 HS_{18}	—	April 16, 2013	Kitt Peak	Spacewatch	·	2.0 km	MPC · JPL
454205	2013 HL_{27}	—	September 11, 2007	Mount Lemmon	Mount Lemmon Survey	NYS	1.0 km	MPC · JPL
454206	2013 HU_{27}	—	May 26, 2000	Kitt Peak	Spacewatch	·	1.5 km	MPC · JPL
454207	2013 HV_{27}	—	October 3, 2010	Kitt Peak	Spacewatch	·	1.6 km	MPC · JPL
454208	2013 HJ_{31}	—	September 10, 2010	Mount Lemmon	Mount Lemmon Survey	·	1.4 km	MPC · JPL
454209	2013 HS_{41}	—	September 26, 2006	Kitt Peak	Spacewatch	·	1.2 km	MPC · JPL
454210	2013 HB_{47}	—	October 3, 2010	Kitt Peak	Spacewatch	EOS	1.6 km	MPC · JPL
454211	2013 HD_{60}	—	January 1, 2009	Kitt Peak	Spacewatch	·	990 m	MPC · JPL
454212	2013 HN_{65}	—	September 22, 2011	Kitt Peak	Spacewatch	·	910 m	MPC · JPL
454213	2013 HQ_{72}	—	December 1, 2006	Mount Lemmon	Mount Lemmon Survey	HOF	2.5 km	MPC · JPL
454214	2013 HR_{72}	—	February 8, 2008	Mount Lemmon	Mount Lemmon Survey	·	1.4 km	MPC · JPL
454215	2013 HN_{90}	—	January 1, 2012	Mount Lemmon	Mount Lemmon Survey	·	3.3 km	MPC · JPL
454216	2013 HH_{107}	—	February 28, 2009	Kitt Peak	Spacewatch	NYS	1 km	MPC · JPL
454217	2013 HZ_{110}	—	October 9, 2010	Mount Lemmon	Mount Lemmon Survey	·	1.7 km	MPC · JPL
454218	2013 HB_{124}	—	July 5, 2005	Kitt Peak	Spacewatch	·	1.6 km	MPC · JPL
454219	2013 JK_{5}	—	May 27, 2008	Mount Lemmon	Mount Lemmon Survey	·	2.5 km	MPC · JPL
454220	2013 JU_{8}	—	January 13, 2008	Kitt Peak	Spacewatch	·	1.4 km	MPC · JPL
454221	2013 JK_{9}	—	April 13, 2013	Kitt Peak	Spacewatch	EOS	2.2 km	MPC · JPL
454222	2013 JP_{15}	—	January 18, 2012	Kitt Peak	Spacewatch	EOS	1.6 km	MPC · JPL
454223	2013 JG_{18}	—	May 26, 2010	WISE	WISE	PHO	2.8 km	MPC · JPL
454224	2013 JW_{18}	—	December 14, 2010	Mount Lemmon	Mount Lemmon Survey	·	2.2 km	MPC · JPL
454225	2013 JQ_{28}	—	June 9, 1999	Kitt Peak	Spacewatch	·	630 m	MPC · JPL
454226	2013 JQ_{36}	—	March 15, 2012	Mount Lemmon	Mount Lemmon Survey	·	3.1 km	MPC · JPL
454227	2013 JH_{37}	—	December 18, 2003	Kitt Peak	Spacewatch	·	1.4 km	MPC · JPL
454228	2013 JJ_{38}	—	April 17, 2009	Mount Lemmon	Mount Lemmon Survey	PHO	960 m	MPC · JPL
454229	2013 JR_{42}	—	October 2, 2006	Mount Lemmon	Mount Lemmon Survey	·	1.7 km	MPC · JPL
454230	2013 JA_{50}	—	September 28, 2006	Kitt Peak	Spacewatch	·	1.3 km	MPC · JPL
454231	2013 JE_{50}	—	March 25, 2006	Kitt Peak	Spacewatch	·	640 m	MPC · JPL
454232	2013 JG_{51}	—	November 2, 2010	Mount Lemmon	Mount Lemmon Survey	·	1.8 km	MPC · JPL
454233	2013 JO_{51}	—	March 7, 2013	Mount Lemmon	Mount Lemmon Survey	RAF	890 m	MPC · JPL
454234	2013 JP_{54}	—	January 17, 2009	Kitt Peak	Spacewatch	NYS	900 m	MPC · JPL
454235	2013 JA_{55}	—	February 29, 2008	Mount Lemmon	Mount Lemmon Survey	·	1.2 km	MPC · JPL
454236	2013 JQ_{61}	—	April 22, 2013	Mount Lemmon	Mount Lemmon Survey	·	1.6 km	MPC · JPL
454237	2013 JY_{62}	—	February 3, 2008	Catalina	CSS	·	2.3 km	MPC · JPL
454238	2013 KE_{11}	—	March 23, 2004	Kitt Peak	Spacewatch	·	1.3 km	MPC · JPL
454239	2013 KV_{14}	—	November 1, 2005	Kitt Peak	Spacewatch	·	1.8 km	MPC · JPL
454240	2013 LH_{1}	—	January 1, 2009	Kitt Peak	Spacewatch	·	860 m	MPC · JPL
454241	2013 LT_{1}	—	January 28, 2010	WISE	WISE	·	3.8 km	MPC · JPL
454242	2013 LP_{4}	—	November 1, 2010	Mount Lemmon	Mount Lemmon Survey	·	1.9 km	MPC · JPL
454243	2013 LB_{7}	—	July 28, 2010	WISE	WISE	·	3.0 km	MPC · JPL
454244	2013 LJ_{10}	—	November 4, 2004	Kitt Peak	Spacewatch	·	3.0 km	MPC · JPL
454245	2013 LK_{10}	—	June 4, 2013	Mount Lemmon	Mount Lemmon Survey	·	1.8 km	MPC · JPL
454246	2013 LS_{19}	—	April 22, 2007	Mount Lemmon	Mount Lemmon Survey	·	2.9 km	MPC · JPL
454247	2013 LT_{22}	—	May 29, 2013	Mount Lemmon	Mount Lemmon Survey	·	4.5 km	MPC · JPL
454248	2013 LB_{24}	—	May 16, 2009	Mount Lemmon	Mount Lemmon Survey	·	1.1 km	MPC · JPL
454249	2013 LJ_{28}	—	February 2, 2008	Kitt Peak	Spacewatch	EUN	1.1 km	MPC · JPL
454250	2013 NO_{9}	—	April 19, 2007	Mount Lemmon	Mount Lemmon Survey	·	2.2 km	MPC · JPL
454251	2013 OZ_{1}	—	December 1, 2006	Mount Lemmon	Mount Lemmon Survey	·	2.1 km	MPC · JPL
454252	2013 OX_{5}	—	December 27, 2011	Kitt Peak	Spacewatch	·	1.3 km	MPC · JPL
454253	2013 PL_{22}	—	September 26, 2008	Kitt Peak	Spacewatch	VER	2.3 km	MPC · JPL
454254	2013 PM_{47}	—	January 13, 2005	Catalina	CSS	·	6.0 km	MPC · JPL
454255	2013 QQ_{44}	—	December 28, 2005	Kitt Peak	Spacewatch	L5	7.9 km	MPC · JPL
454256	2013 RD_{85}	—	November 7, 2008	Mount Lemmon	Mount Lemmon Survey	VER	2.8 km	MPC · JPL
454257	2013 RH_{98}	—	January 11, 2008	Kitt Peak	Spacewatch	L5	10 km	MPC · JPL
454258	2013 SD_{10}	—	March 3, 2005	Kitt Peak	Spacewatch	·	4.6 km	MPC · JPL
454259	2013 SH_{23}	—	April 25, 2006	Kitt Peak	Spacewatch	·	3.7 km	MPC · JPL
454260	2013 TO	—	October 31, 2008	Catalina	CSS	·	3.9 km	MPC · JPL
454261	2013 TM_{33}	—	April 4, 2005	Mount Lemmon	Mount Lemmon Survey	·	3.4 km	MPC · JPL
454262	2014 BG_{9}	—	November 28, 2005	Mount Lemmon	Mount Lemmon Survey	H	530 m	MPC · JPL
454263	2014 DC_{124}	—	October 30, 2005	Kitt Peak	Spacewatch	·	740 m	MPC · JPL
454264	2014 EP_{24}	—	February 25, 2006	Mount Lemmon	Mount Lemmon Survey	H	620 m	MPC · JPL
454265	2014 EY_{32}	—	September 15, 2004	Kitt Peak	Spacewatch	H	490 m	MPC · JPL
454266	2014 FM_{7}	—	October 1, 2008	Siding Spring	SSS	AMO	580 m	MPC · JPL
454267	2014 FS_{20}	—	April 20, 2007	Kitt Peak	Spacewatch	·	1 km	MPC · JPL
454268	2014 FN_{55}	—	March 17, 2010	Kitt Peak	Spacewatch	·	1.3 km	MPC · JPL
454269	2014 FC_{68}	—	September 24, 2008	Mount Lemmon	Mount Lemmon Survey	·	820 m	MPC · JPL
454270	2014 GM_{30}	—	October 13, 1999	Kitt Peak	Spacewatch	·	600 m	MPC · JPL
454271	2014 HN	—	August 12, 2004	Reedy Creek	J. Broughton	·	710 m	MPC · JPL
454272	2014 HJ_{2}	—	December 16, 2007	Kitt Peak	Spacewatch	H	660 m	MPC · JPL
454273	2014 HU_{10}	—	August 30, 2005	Kitt Peak	Spacewatch	·	620 m	MPC · JPL
454274	2014 HQ_{20}	—	September 18, 2011	Mount Lemmon	Mount Lemmon Survey	NYS	960 m	MPC · JPL
454275	2014 HR_{28}	—	October 10, 2004	Kitt Peak	Spacewatch	·	1.1 km	MPC · JPL
454276	2014 HU_{30}	—	April 14, 2007	Kitt Peak	Spacewatch	·	590 m	MPC · JPL
454277	2014 HB_{31}	—	July 21, 2006	Mount Lemmon	Mount Lemmon Survey	·	1.6 km	MPC · JPL
454278	2014 HX_{36}	—	July 30, 2008	Kitt Peak	Spacewatch	·	660 m	MPC · JPL
454279	2014 HO_{47}	—	January 27, 2007	Mount Lemmon	Mount Lemmon Survey	·	590 m	MPC · JPL
454280	2014 HE_{101}	—	August 29, 2005	Kitt Peak	Spacewatch	·	610 m	MPC · JPL
454281	2014 HP_{125}	—	October 10, 2008	Kitt Peak	Spacewatch	·	630 m	MPC · JPL
454282	2014 HA_{133}	—	May 19, 2010	Mount Lemmon	Mount Lemmon Survey	PHO	980 m	MPC · JPL
454283	2014 HE_{133}	—	February 20, 2006	Mount Lemmon	Mount Lemmon Survey	·	1.2 km	MPC · JPL
454284	2014 HU_{145}	—	February 26, 2014	Mount Lemmon	Mount Lemmon Survey	·	740 m	MPC · JPL
454285	2014 HZ_{160}	—	June 13, 2005	Mount Lemmon	Mount Lemmon Survey	·	660 m	MPC · JPL
454286	2014 HV_{178}	—	March 12, 2010	Mount Lemmon	Mount Lemmon Survey	·	1.5 km	MPC · JPL
454287	2014 HV_{186}	—	March 16, 2007	Mount Lemmon	Mount Lemmon Survey	(2076)	750 m	MPC · JPL
454288	2014 JL_{2}	—	July 12, 2010	WISE	WISE	·	3.5 km	MPC · JPL
454289	2014 JA_{4}	—	October 9, 2005	Kitt Peak	Spacewatch	·	730 m	MPC · JPL
454290	2014 JE_{7}	—	October 22, 2011	Mount Lemmon	Mount Lemmon Survey	ERI	2.6 km	MPC · JPL
454291	2014 JG_{8}	—	September 10, 2007	Kitt Peak	Spacewatch	NYS	1.1 km	MPC · JPL
454292	2014 JS_{8}	—	May 12, 2007	Kitt Peak	Spacewatch	NYS	870 m	MPC · JPL
454293	2014 JX_{14}	—	September 20, 2011	Catalina	CSS	·	1.1 km	MPC · JPL
454294	2014 JB_{23}	—	December 26, 2005	Kitt Peak	Spacewatch	·	970 m	MPC · JPL
454295	2014 JT_{24}	—	April 2, 2009	Kitt Peak	Spacewatch	H	630 m	MPC · JPL
454296	2014 JF_{26}	—	January 31, 2009	Mount Lemmon	Mount Lemmon Survey	EUN	1.2 km	MPC · JPL
454297	2014 JJ_{28}	—	February 26, 2007	Mount Lemmon	Mount Lemmon Survey	·	740 m	MPC · JPL
454298	2014 JW_{30}	—	January 5, 2003	Socorro	LINEAR	H	610 m	MPC · JPL
454299	2014 JA_{37}	—	May 10, 2010	WISE	WISE	DOR	2.5 km	MPC · JPL
454300	2014 JC_{39}	—	June 4, 2011	Mount Lemmon	Mount Lemmon Survey	·	590 m	MPC · JPL

== 454301–454400 ==
back to top

Designation			Discovery			Properties		Ref
Permanent	Provisional	Named after	Date	Site	Discoverer(s)	Category	Diam.	Ref
454301	2014 JW_{41}	—	October 12, 2005	Kitt Peak	Spacewatch	·	590 m	MPC · JPL
454302	2014 JX_{41}	—	June 8, 2010	WISE	WISE	·	2.5 km	MPC · JPL
454303	2014 JR_{43}	—	May 5, 2014	Mount Lemmon	Mount Lemmon Survey	(2076)	790 m	MPC · JPL
454304	2014 JN_{55}	—	November 7, 2007	Mount Lemmon	Mount Lemmon Survey	H	610 m	MPC · JPL
454305	2014 JW_{64}	—	May 31, 2010	WISE	WISE	·	2.0 km	MPC · JPL
454306	2014 JU_{65}	—	November 7, 2008	Mount Lemmon	Mount Lemmon Survey	·	800 m	MPC · JPL
454307	2014 JJ_{66}	—	November 1, 2008	Kitt Peak	Spacewatch	·	730 m	MPC · JPL
454308	2014 JR_{66}	—	May 19, 2005	Mount Lemmon	Mount Lemmon Survey	·	1.5 km	MPC · JPL
454309	2014 JS_{69}	—	September 29, 2011	Kitt Peak	Spacewatch	NYS	1.0 km	MPC · JPL
454310	2014 JR_{70}	—	August 31, 2000	Socorro	LINEAR	·	1.3 km	MPC · JPL
454311	2014 JC_{71}	—	September 23, 2011	Kitt Peak	Spacewatch	·	1.1 km	MPC · JPL
454312	2014 JH_{73}	—	September 10, 2007	Kitt Peak	Spacewatch	·	980 m	MPC · JPL
454313	2014 JJ_{74}	—	August 29, 2005	Kitt Peak	Spacewatch	·	690 m	MPC · JPL
454314	2014 KK_{6}	—	May 13, 2010	WISE	WISE	·	1.7 km	MPC · JPL
454315	2014 KF_{12}	—	June 16, 2010	Mount Lemmon	Mount Lemmon Survey	·	1.0 km	MPC · JPL
454316	2014 KS_{18}	—	October 7, 2005	Kitt Peak	Spacewatch	·	2.9 km	MPC · JPL
454317	2014 KK_{19}	—	October 21, 2011	Mount Lemmon	Mount Lemmon Survey	EUN	990 m	MPC · JPL
454318	2014 KR_{20}	—	October 3, 2008	Mount Lemmon	Mount Lemmon Survey	·	640 m	MPC · JPL
454319	2014 KV_{20}	—	September 25, 2006	Catalina	CSS	·	1.8 km	MPC · JPL
454320	2014 KC_{32}	—	October 12, 2007	Mount Lemmon	Mount Lemmon Survey	·	1.1 km	MPC · JPL
454321	2014 KQ_{40}	—	August 28, 2011	Siding Spring	SSS	·	1.1 km	MPC · JPL
454322	2014 KF_{44}	—	September 17, 2009	Mount Lemmon	Mount Lemmon Survey	·	2.2 km	MPC · JPL
454323	2014 KK_{45}	—	November 3, 2010	Kitt Peak	Spacewatch	H	620 m	MPC · JPL
454324	2014 KP_{45}	—	May 24, 2001	Kitt Peak	Spacewatch	H	500 m	MPC · JPL
454325	2014 KR_{45}	—	January 1, 2008	Catalina	CSS	H	650 m	MPC · JPL
454326 Donlee	2014 KB_{52}	Donlee	May 17, 2010	WISE	WISE	·	2.5 km	MPC · JPL
454327	2014 KP_{54}	—	October 8, 2007	Mount Lemmon	Mount Lemmon Survey	·	970 m	MPC · JPL
454328	2014 KX_{56}	—	November 15, 2007	Catalina	CSS	·	1.8 km	MPC · JPL
454329 Ericpiquette	2014 KL_{59}	Ericpiquette	June 10, 2010	WISE	WISE	·	1.6 km	MPC · JPL
454330	2014 KZ_{75}	—	July 16, 2004	Campo Imperatore	CINEOS	·	840 m	MPC · JPL
454331	2014 KQ_{80}	—	September 22, 2008	Kitt Peak	Spacewatch	·	550 m	MPC · JPL
454332	2014 KA_{85}	—	January 10, 2003	Socorro	LINEAR	H	600 m	MPC · JPL
454333	2014 KP_{86}	—	October 27, 2005	Kitt Peak	Spacewatch	·	670 m	MPC · JPL
454334	2014 KU_{87}	—	September 18, 2004	Socorro	LINEAR	·	930 m	MPC · JPL
454335	2014 KW_{90}	—	August 9, 2010	XuYi	PMO NEO Survey Program	·	1.5 km	MPC · JPL
454336	2014 KM_{95}	—	December 30, 2008	Kitt Peak	Spacewatch	PHO	2.5 km	MPC · JPL
454337	2014 KM_{98}	—	April 22, 2007	Kitt Peak	Spacewatch	·	650 m	MPC · JPL
454338	2014 KW_{98}	—	October 25, 2012	Mount Lemmon	Mount Lemmon Survey	H	560 m	MPC · JPL
454339	2014 LM	—	January 18, 2012	Mount Lemmon	Mount Lemmon Survey	·	3.3 km	MPC · JPL
454340	2014 LY_{12}	—	October 26, 2008	Kitt Peak	Spacewatch	·	740 m	MPC · JPL
454341	2014 LS_{13}	—	December 29, 2008	Mount Lemmon	Mount Lemmon Survey	·	1.6 km	MPC · JPL
454342	2014 LC_{15}	—	June 3, 2005	Siding Spring	SSS	·	2.2 km	MPC · JPL
454343	2014 LL_{15}	—	September 13, 2007	Kitt Peak	Spacewatch	·	1.1 km	MPC · JPL
454344	2014 LQ_{15}	—	March 25, 2006	Kitt Peak	Spacewatch	·	990 m	MPC · JPL
454345	2014 LE_{18}	—	October 13, 2004	Kitt Peak	Spacewatch	·	1.0 km	MPC · JPL
454346	2014 LH_{19}	—	June 18, 2010	Mount Lemmon	Mount Lemmon Survey	·	1.3 km	MPC · JPL
454347	2014 LB_{21}	—	November 18, 2007	Catalina	CSS	H	490 m	MPC · JPL
454348	2014 LP_{22}	—	March 15, 2004	Kitt Peak	Spacewatch	·	570 m	MPC · JPL
454349	2014 LY_{22}	—	September 25, 2006	Catalina	CSS	·	2.1 km	MPC · JPL
454350 Paolaamico	2014 LH_{24}	Paolaamico	April 30, 2010	WISE	WISE	·	2.5 km	MPC · JPL
454351	2014 LH_{25}	—	December 4, 2007	Kitt Peak	Spacewatch	(5)	1.7 km	MPC · JPL
454352 Majidzandian	2014 LO_{26}	Majidzandian	July 6, 2010	WISE	WISE	·	4.2 km	MPC · JPL
454353	2014 LD_{28}	—	April 5, 2003	Kitt Peak	Spacewatch	·	980 m	MPC · JPL
454354	2014 ME	—	March 15, 2009	Kitt Peak	Spacewatch	·	1.8 km	MPC · JPL
454355	2014 MJ_{7}	—	November 19, 2007	Kitt Peak	Spacewatch	·	1.5 km	MPC · JPL
454356	2014 MK_{7}	—	May 2, 2006	Mount Lemmon	Mount Lemmon Survey	·	1.1 km	MPC · JPL
454357	2014 MZ_{11}	—	February 28, 2008	Mount Lemmon	Mount Lemmon Survey	·	2.1 km	MPC · JPL
454358	2014 MZ_{12}	—	June 21, 2014	Mount Lemmon	Mount Lemmon Survey	·	2.9 km	MPC · JPL
454359	2014 MF_{17}	—	January 30, 2012	Kitt Peak	Spacewatch	·	2.4 km	MPC · JPL
454360	2014 MD_{21}	—	September 23, 2004	Kitt Peak	Spacewatch	·	780 m	MPC · JPL
454361	2014 MY_{23}	—	February 6, 2013	Kitt Peak	Spacewatch	·	1.7 km	MPC · JPL
454362	2014 MZ_{23}	—	January 7, 2006	Mount Lemmon	Mount Lemmon Survey	·	3.0 km	MPC · JPL
454363	2014 MF_{24}	—	April 7, 2003	Kitt Peak	Spacewatch	·	730 m	MPC · JPL
454364	2014 MX_{36}	—	September 26, 2009	Mount Lemmon	Mount Lemmon Survey	·	2.0 km	MPC · JPL
454365	2014 MH_{38}	—	September 29, 2005	Kitt Peak	Spacewatch	AGN	1.3 km	MPC · JPL
454366	2014 MR_{39}	—	May 22, 2006	Kitt Peak	Spacewatch	·	1.6 km	MPC · JPL
454367	2014 MW_{42}	—	May 4, 2005	Kitt Peak	Spacewatch	·	1.3 km	MPC · JPL
454368	2014 MJ_{43}	—	September 14, 2009	Catalina	CSS	EOS	2.2 km	MPC · JPL
454369	2014 MT_{43}	—	April 5, 2010	Kitt Peak	Spacewatch	·	1.0 km	MPC · JPL
454370	2014 MC_{44}	—	February 3, 2009	Mount Lemmon	Mount Lemmon Survey	·	1.0 km	MPC · JPL
454371	2014 MX_{45}	—	February 25, 2006	Kitt Peak	Spacewatch	·	970 m	MPC · JPL
454372	2014 MQ_{46}	—	April 22, 2009	Mount Lemmon	Mount Lemmon Survey	·	1.7 km	MPC · JPL
454373	2014 ME_{47}	—	August 26, 2005	Siding Spring	SSS	·	1.9 km	MPC · JPL
454374	2014 ML_{47}	—	May 22, 2003	Kitt Peak	Spacewatch	·	910 m	MPC · JPL
454375	2014 MT_{48}	—	November 22, 2011	Mount Lemmon	Mount Lemmon Survey	·	2.4 km	MPC · JPL
454376	2014 MM_{49}	—	August 18, 2006	Kitt Peak	Spacewatch	·	1.2 km	MPC · JPL
454377	2014 MR_{52}	—	March 12, 2013	Siding Spring	SSS	·	1.7 km	MPC · JPL
454378	2014 MP_{55}	—	January 17, 2007	Kitt Peak	Spacewatch	·	1.4 km	MPC · JPL
454379	2014 MD_{56}	—	March 16, 2010	Mount Lemmon	Mount Lemmon Survey	·	640 m	MPC · JPL
454380	2014 ME_{56}	—	October 22, 2011	Mount Lemmon	Mount Lemmon Survey	·	820 m	MPC · JPL
454381	2014 MM_{57}	—	November 16, 2006	Kitt Peak	Spacewatch	·	2.0 km	MPC · JPL
454382	2014 MJ_{58}	—	October 5, 2004	Kitt Peak	Spacewatch	·	2.1 km	MPC · JPL
454383	2014 MF_{61}	—	January 12, 2008	Mount Lemmon	Mount Lemmon Survey	·	3.0 km	MPC · JPL
454384	2014 MR_{62}	—	January 24, 2007	Mount Lemmon	Mount Lemmon Survey	·	2.1 km	MPC · JPL
454385	2014 MH_{63}	—	May 8, 2008	Mount Lemmon	Mount Lemmon Survey	·	2.3 km	MPC · JPL
454386	2014 MZ_{63}	—	January 16, 2013	Mount Lemmon	Mount Lemmon Survey	·	830 m	MPC · JPL
454387	2014 MD_{64}	—	December 16, 2007	Mount Lemmon	Mount Lemmon Survey	H	650 m	MPC · JPL
454388	2014 ME_{69}	—	December 18, 2004	Mount Lemmon	Mount Lemmon Survey	H	660 m	MPC · JPL
454389	2014 MJ_{69}	—	June 26, 2006	Siding Spring	SSS	·	1.5 km	MPC · JPL
454390	2014 ND_{11}	—	April 24, 2006	Kitt Peak	Spacewatch	·	1.1 km	MPC · JPL
454391	2014 NG_{17}	—	April 9, 2003	Kitt Peak	Spacewatch	·	4.0 km	MPC · JPL
454392	2014 NB_{18}	—	January 10, 2006	Kitt Peak	Spacewatch	·	1.4 km	MPC · JPL
454393	2014 NS_{18}	—	December 17, 2007	Mount Lemmon	Mount Lemmon Survey	·	1.8 km	MPC · JPL
454394	2014 NF_{21}	—	September 30, 2009	Mount Lemmon	Mount Lemmon Survey	·	2.5 km	MPC · JPL
454395	2014 NO_{21}	—	October 27, 2005	Mount Lemmon	Mount Lemmon Survey	·	2.7 km	MPC · JPL
454396	2014 NL_{26}	—	December 22, 2008	Kitt Peak	Spacewatch	V	740 m	MPC · JPL
454397	2014 NU_{30}	—	January 13, 2008	Kitt Peak	Spacewatch	·	1.3 km	MPC · JPL
454398	2014 NY_{30}	—	October 22, 2011	Mount Lemmon	Mount Lemmon Survey	·	940 m	MPC · JPL
454399	2014 NJ_{31}	—	January 13, 2008	Kitt Peak	Spacewatch	·	1.6 km	MPC · JPL
454400	2014 NK_{31}	—	October 9, 2007	XuYi	PMO NEO Survey Program	·	1.4 km	MPC · JPL

== 454401–454500 ==
back to top

Designation			Discovery			Properties		Ref
Permanent	Provisional	Named after	Date	Site	Discoverer(s)	Category	Diam.	Ref
454401	2014 NF_{34}	—	April 26, 2007	Mount Lemmon	Mount Lemmon Survey	·	3.4 km	MPC · JPL
454402	2014 NM_{35}	—	November 23, 2006	Kitt Peak	Spacewatch	·	2.3 km	MPC · JPL
454403	2014 NW_{35}	—	May 16, 2010	Mount Lemmon	Mount Lemmon Survey	·	1.1 km	MPC · JPL
454404	2014 NF_{37}	—	January 21, 2006	Kitt Peak	Spacewatch	·	3.6 km	MPC · JPL
454405	2014 NZ_{38}	—	October 23, 2009	Catalina	CSS	T_{j} (2.96)	5.2 km	MPC · JPL
454406	2014 NT_{43}	—	September 5, 2010	Mount Lemmon	Mount Lemmon Survey	EUN	1.0 km	MPC · JPL
454407	2014 NA_{44}	—	September 21, 2009	Mount Lemmon	Mount Lemmon Survey	·	2.2 km	MPC · JPL
454408	2014 NJ_{44}	—	September 6, 2010	Mount Lemmon	Mount Lemmon Survey	·	1.6 km	MPC · JPL
454409 Markusloose	2014 NP_{44}	Markusloose	May 25, 2010	WISE	WISE	·	1.7 km	MPC · JPL
454410	2014 NS_{45}	—	November 19, 2003	Kitt Peak	Spacewatch	·	2.3 km	MPC · JPL
454411	2014 NC_{47}	—	September 16, 2003	Kitt Peak	Spacewatch	·	2.9 km	MPC · JPL
454412	2014 NY_{47}	—	September 23, 2011	Kitt Peak	Spacewatch	·	880 m	MPC · JPL
454413	2014 NL_{50}	—	October 1, 2005	Mount Lemmon	Mount Lemmon Survey	·	1.4 km	MPC · JPL
454414	2014 NJ_{54}	—	August 30, 2005	Kitt Peak	Spacewatch	AGN	1.4 km	MPC · JPL
454415	2014 NN_{54}	—	November 10, 2004	Kitt Peak	Spacewatch	·	2.6 km	MPC · JPL
454416	2014 NZ_{54}	—	December 3, 2010	Kitt Peak	Spacewatch	·	2.5 km	MPC · JPL
454417	2014 NV_{56}	—	December 18, 2004	Mount Lemmon	Mount Lemmon Survey	·	3.2 km	MPC · JPL
454418	2014 NJ_{57}	—	March 31, 2008	Mount Lemmon	Mount Lemmon Survey	·	2.7 km	MPC · JPL
454419 Hansklausreif	2014 NJ_{58}	Hansklausreif	May 21, 2010	WISE	WISE	·	2.2 km	MPC · JPL
454420	2014 NJ_{59}	—	December 28, 2005	Mount Lemmon	Mount Lemmon Survey	·	2.6 km	MPC · JPL
454421	2014 NA_{61}	—	November 18, 2007	Mount Lemmon	Mount Lemmon Survey	·	2.6 km	MPC · JPL
454422	2014 NZ_{61}	—	January 1, 2009	Mount Lemmon	Mount Lemmon Survey	·	1.4 km	MPC · JPL
454423	2014 NH_{62}	—	January 20, 2008	Mount Lemmon	Mount Lemmon Survey	·	1.4 km	MPC · JPL
454424	2014 NZ_{63}	—	November 18, 2007	Mount Lemmon	Mount Lemmon Survey	·	2.1 km	MPC · JPL
454425	2014 OF	—	September 18, 2006	Kitt Peak	Spacewatch	·	1.3 km	MPC · JPL
454426	2014 OK_{3}	—	December 28, 2005	Mount Lemmon	Mount Lemmon Survey	·	1.9 km	MPC · JPL
454427	2014 OW_{6}	—	October 9, 2004	Kitt Peak	Spacewatch	·	1.7 km	MPC · JPL
454428	2014 OD_{13}	—	April 10, 2013	Mount Lemmon	Mount Lemmon Survey	·	1.6 km	MPC · JPL
454429	2014 OP_{13}	—	September 19, 2003	Campo Imperatore	CINEOS	·	3.0 km	MPC · JPL
454430	2014 OL_{14}	—	January 10, 2006	Mount Lemmon	Mount Lemmon Survey	·	730 m	MPC · JPL
454431	2014 OR_{14}	—	April 18, 2007	Mount Lemmon	Mount Lemmon Survey	·	550 m	MPC · JPL
454432	2014 OD_{15}	—	December 30, 2005	Kitt Peak	Spacewatch	EOS	1.8 km	MPC · JPL
454433	2014 OS_{16}	—	February 24, 2008	Mount Lemmon	Mount Lemmon Survey	·	1.5 km	MPC · JPL
454434	2014 OA_{18}	—	August 30, 2005	Kitt Peak	Spacewatch	AGN	1.0 km	MPC · JPL
454435	2014 OH_{19}	—	October 28, 2006	Mount Lemmon	Mount Lemmon Survey	·	1.1 km	MPC · JPL
454436	2014 OK_{19}	—	December 10, 2006	Kitt Peak	Spacewatch	AGN	940 m	MPC · JPL
454437	2014 OQ_{19}	—	October 30, 2007	Mount Lemmon	Mount Lemmon Survey	·	1.1 km	MPC · JPL
454438	2014 OG_{22}	—	September 28, 2006	Kitt Peak	Spacewatch	·	1.5 km	MPC · JPL
454439	2014 OZ_{24}	—	September 18, 2003	Kitt Peak	Spacewatch	·	2.1 km	MPC · JPL
454440	2014 OB_{26}	—	February 28, 2008	Mount Lemmon	Mount Lemmon Survey	·	1.6 km	MPC · JPL
454441	2014 OK_{26}	—	September 21, 2009	Kitt Peak	Spacewatch	·	2.5 km	MPC · JPL
454442	2014 OT_{26}	—	September 27, 2006	Mount Lemmon	Mount Lemmon Survey	·	1.2 km	MPC · JPL
454443	2014 OQ_{29}	—	November 29, 2011	Mount Lemmon	Mount Lemmon Survey	·	1.9 km	MPC · JPL
454444	2014 OD_{30}	—	October 16, 2006	Kitt Peak	Spacewatch	(12739)	1.4 km	MPC · JPL
454445	2014 OF_{30}	—	December 15, 2007	Kitt Peak	Spacewatch	·	1.1 km	MPC · JPL
454446	2014 ON_{30}	—	September 4, 2010	Kitt Peak	Spacewatch	·	1.7 km	MPC · JPL
454447	2014 OD_{31}	—	December 17, 2007	Kitt Peak	Spacewatch	·	820 m	MPC · JPL
454448	2014 OF_{35}	—	January 11, 2008	Kitt Peak	Spacewatch	·	1.4 km	MPC · JPL
454449	2014 OC_{37}	—	October 1, 1995	Kitt Peak	Spacewatch	KOR	980 m	MPC · JPL
454450	2014 OY_{37}	—	March 16, 2005	Catalina	CSS	EUN	960 m	MPC · JPL
454451	2014 OM_{39}	—	October 26, 2009	Kitt Peak	Spacewatch	THM	2.0 km	MPC · JPL
454452	2014 OW_{39}	—	October 22, 2006	Mount Lemmon	Mount Lemmon Survey	·	1.4 km	MPC · JPL
454453	2014 OR_{40}	—	December 17, 2003	Kitt Peak	Spacewatch	·	1.1 km	MPC · JPL
454454	2014 OS_{41}	—	November 10, 2010	Mount Lemmon	Mount Lemmon Survey	KOR	940 m	MPC · JPL
454455	2014 OL_{42}	—	September 30, 2010	Mount Lemmon	Mount Lemmon Survey	NEM	1.9 km	MPC · JPL
454456	2014 OQ_{42}	—	March 29, 2009	Kitt Peak	Spacewatch	(5)	1.1 km	MPC · JPL
454457	2014 OW_{43}	—	October 16, 2001	Kitt Peak	Spacewatch	·	1.5 km	MPC · JPL
454458	2014 OC_{44}	—	September 10, 2007	Kitt Peak	Spacewatch	·	950 m	MPC · JPL
454459	2014 OV_{45}	—	November 20, 2007	Kitt Peak	Spacewatch	·	1.0 km	MPC · JPL
454460	2014 OY_{47}	—	October 31, 2005	Kitt Peak	Spacewatch	KOR	1.2 km	MPC · JPL
454461	2014 OC_{52}	—	October 8, 2005	Kitt Peak	Spacewatch	KOR	1.1 km	MPC · JPL
454462	2014 OX_{52}	—	September 26, 2006	Mount Lemmon	Mount Lemmon Survey	·	1.2 km	MPC · JPL
454463	2014 OY_{52}	—	January 26, 2012	Mount Lemmon	Mount Lemmon Survey	HOF	2.4 km	MPC · JPL
454464	2014 OS_{53}	—	December 10, 2010	Mount Lemmon	Mount Lemmon Survey	·	2.2 km	MPC · JPL
454465	2014 OQ_{54}	—	September 1, 2005	Kitt Peak	Spacewatch	·	1.7 km	MPC · JPL
454466	2014 OF_{58}	—	October 22, 2006	Catalina	CSS	·	1.6 km	MPC · JPL
454467	2014 OY_{58}	—	February 17, 2007	Mount Lemmon	Mount Lemmon Survey	·	2.1 km	MPC · JPL
454468	2014 OT_{66}	—	June 28, 2014	Kitt Peak	Spacewatch	EUN	1.0 km	MPC · JPL
454469	2014 OB_{71}	—	May 30, 2003	Socorro	LINEAR	·	1.1 km	MPC · JPL
454470	2014 OL_{71}	—	May 4, 2005	Kitt Peak	Spacewatch	·	2.4 km	MPC · JPL
454471	2014 OH_{73}	—	October 31, 2006	Catalina	CSS	JUN	1.3 km	MPC · JPL
454472	2014 OT_{88}	—	September 20, 1995	Kitt Peak	Spacewatch	·	1.2 km	MPC · JPL
454473	2014 OT_{91}	—	September 29, 1994	Kitt Peak	Spacewatch	·	710 m	MPC · JPL
454474	2014 OG_{94}	—	November 30, 2005	Mount Lemmon	Mount Lemmon Survey	·	1.5 km	MPC · JPL
454475	2014 OU_{98}	—	December 30, 2005	Kitt Peak	Spacewatch	·	2.1 km	MPC · JPL
454476	2014 OM_{100}	—	April 3, 2008	Kitt Peak	Spacewatch	·	1.9 km	MPC · JPL
454477	2014 ON_{103}	—	November 4, 2010	Mount Lemmon	Mount Lemmon Survey	GEF	1.4 km	MPC · JPL
454478	2014 OM_{107}	—	May 6, 2006	Mount Lemmon	Mount Lemmon Survey	·	1.1 km	MPC · JPL
454479	2014 OP_{108}	—	December 14, 2010	Mount Lemmon	Mount Lemmon Survey	·	3.2 km	MPC · JPL
454480	2014 OY_{108}	—	March 13, 2007	Mount Lemmon	Mount Lemmon Survey	·	560 m	MPC · JPL
454481	2014 OQ_{115}	—	July 4, 2005	Mount Lemmon	Mount Lemmon Survey	·	2.0 km	MPC · JPL
454482	2014 OY_{121}	—	December 30, 2005	Mount Lemmon	Mount Lemmon Survey	EOS	1.8 km	MPC · JPL
454483	2014 OO_{123}	—	September 19, 2006	Kitt Peak	Spacewatch	·	1.0 km	MPC · JPL
454484	2014 OK_{126}	—	December 21, 2006	Kitt Peak	Spacewatch	HOF	3.0 km	MPC · JPL
454485	2014 OG_{130}	—	February 21, 1995	Kitt Peak	Spacewatch	·	1.0 km	MPC · JPL
454486	2014 OC_{137}	—	November 26, 2011	Mount Lemmon	Mount Lemmon Survey	·	2.1 km	MPC · JPL
454487	2014 OL_{138}	—	October 21, 2006	Mount Lemmon	Mount Lemmon Survey	·	1.3 km	MPC · JPL
454488	2014 OV_{138}	—	September 28, 2006	Kitt Peak	Spacewatch	·	1.1 km	MPC · JPL
454489	2014 OZ_{138}	—	March 26, 2006	Kitt Peak	Spacewatch	·	1.3 km	MPC · JPL
454490	2014 OB_{139}	—	February 9, 2010	Mount Lemmon	Mount Lemmon Survey	·	560 m	MPC · JPL
454491	2014 ON_{141}	—	April 11, 2013	Mount Lemmon	Mount Lemmon Survey	VER	2.3 km	MPC · JPL
454492	2014 OW_{143}	—	November 16, 2006	Mount Lemmon	Mount Lemmon Survey	·	1.5 km	MPC · JPL
454493	2014 OS_{144}	—	November 25, 2000	Kitt Peak	Spacewatch	MAS	760 m	MPC · JPL
454494	2014 OR_{150}	—	November 10, 2006	Kitt Peak	Spacewatch	·	1.4 km	MPC · JPL
454495	2014 OW_{151}	—	December 11, 2002	Socorro	LINEAR	EUN	1.2 km	MPC · JPL
454496	2014 OP_{155}	—	January 15, 2008	Mount Lemmon	Mount Lemmon Survey	·	1.9 km	MPC · JPL
454497	2014 OP_{170}	—	October 10, 2010	Kitt Peak	Spacewatch	·	1.6 km	MPC · JPL
454498	2014 OM_{175}	—	December 24, 2006	Kitt Peak	Spacewatch	·	2.1 km	MPC · JPL
454499	2014 OU_{176}	—	September 28, 2006	Mount Lemmon	Mount Lemmon Survey	·	1.5 km	MPC · JPL
454500	2014 OD_{178}	—	September 17, 2010	Mount Lemmon	Mount Lemmon Survey	·	1.4 km	MPC · JPL

== 454501–454600 ==
back to top

Designation			Discovery			Properties		Ref
Permanent	Provisional	Named after	Date	Site	Discoverer(s)	Category	Diam.	Ref
454501	2014 OF_{178}	—	January 7, 2005	Catalina	CSS	·	990 m	MPC · JPL
454502	2014 OX_{178}	—	October 11, 2007	Catalina	CSS	·	1.3 km	MPC · JPL
454503	2014 OY_{178}	—	April 4, 2005	Mount Lemmon	Mount Lemmon Survey	·	1.7 km	MPC · JPL
454504	2014 OD_{180}	—	April 30, 2008	Kitt Peak	Spacewatch	·	2.1 km	MPC · JPL
454505 Suntharalingam	2014 OS_{180}	Suntharalingam	January 20, 2010	WISE	WISE	·	2.8 km	MPC · JPL
454506	2014 OB_{181}	—	October 13, 2007	Catalina	CSS	·	1.7 km	MPC · JPL
454507	2014 OK_{182}	—	April 14, 2008	Mount Lemmon	Mount Lemmon Survey	·	1.8 km	MPC · JPL
454508	2014 OQ_{184}	—	December 2, 2005	Mount Lemmon	Mount Lemmon Survey	·	2.2 km	MPC · JPL
454509	2014 OG_{185}	—	October 31, 2006	Mount Lemmon	Mount Lemmon Survey	·	2.2 km	MPC · JPL
454510	2014 OU_{185}	—	January 2, 2011	Mount Lemmon	Mount Lemmon Survey	·	2.4 km	MPC · JPL
454511	2014 OJ_{197}	—	January 8, 2010	WISE	WISE	·	2.1 km	MPC · JPL
454512	2014 OT_{201}	—	December 22, 2005	Kitt Peak	Spacewatch	·	600 m	MPC · JPL
454513	2014 OB_{205}	—	August 30, 2005	Kitt Peak	Spacewatch	AGN	1.1 km	MPC · JPL
454514	2014 OA_{210}	—	December 5, 2007	Mount Lemmon	Mount Lemmon Survey	·	1.9 km	MPC · JPL
454515	2014 OG_{212}	—	November 22, 2000	Kitt Peak	Spacewatch	·	2.2 km	MPC · JPL
454516	2014 ON_{214}	—	September 23, 2009	Catalina	CSS	·	3.0 km	MPC · JPL
454517	2014 OK_{215}	—	February 10, 2010	Kitt Peak	Spacewatch	·	620 m	MPC · JPL
454518	2014 OA_{218}	—	April 10, 2010	Kitt Peak	Spacewatch	V	580 m	MPC · JPL
454519	2014 OL_{220}	—	February 11, 2008	Mount Lemmon	Mount Lemmon Survey	·	2.0 km	MPC · JPL
454520	2014 OM_{224}	—	October 28, 2010	Mount Lemmon	Mount Lemmon Survey	·	1.5 km	MPC · JPL
454521	2014 OH_{226}	—	October 25, 2005	Kitt Peak	Spacewatch	·	1.9 km	MPC · JPL
454522	2014 OX_{226}	—	June 5, 2013	Mount Lemmon	Mount Lemmon Survey	·	2.7 km	MPC · JPL
454523	2014 OR_{240}	—	September 26, 2006	Mount Lemmon	Mount Lemmon Survey	·	1.2 km	MPC · JPL
454524	2014 OB_{241}	—	October 8, 2007	Mount Lemmon	Mount Lemmon Survey	T_{j} (2.97)	2.6 km	MPC · JPL
454525	2014 OD_{243}	—	March 14, 2004	Kitt Peak	Spacewatch	·	510 m	MPC · JPL
454526	2014 ON_{246}	—	January 19, 2012	Haleakala	Pan-STARRS 1	·	2.2 km	MPC · JPL
454527	2014 OM_{263}	—	December 14, 2010	Mount Lemmon	Mount Lemmon Survey	·	3.0 km	MPC · JPL
454528	2014 OZ_{273}	—	October 30, 2002	Kitt Peak	Spacewatch	·	1.2 km	MPC · JPL
454529	2014 OQ_{276}	—	October 17, 1998	Kitt Peak	Spacewatch	·	3.5 km	MPC · JPL
454530	2014 OW_{282}	—	August 17, 2009	Kitt Peak	Spacewatch	·	2.4 km	MPC · JPL
454531	2014 OT_{286}	—	March 23, 2006	Mount Lemmon	Mount Lemmon Survey	·	1.6 km	MPC · JPL
454532	2014 OP_{291}	—	January 10, 2011	Mount Lemmon	Mount Lemmon Survey	·	2.9 km	MPC · JPL
454533	2014 OG_{308}	—	January 22, 2006	Mount Lemmon	Mount Lemmon Survey	·	2.7 km	MPC · JPL
454534	2014 OH_{309}	—	July 27, 2009	Kitt Peak	Spacewatch	EOS	1.8 km	MPC · JPL
454535	2014 OB_{311}	—	September 10, 2010	Kitt Peak	Spacewatch	·	1.2 km	MPC · JPL
454536	2014 OX_{317}	—	March 19, 2007	Mount Lemmon	Mount Lemmon Survey	·	2.4 km	MPC · JPL
454537	2014 OD_{333}	—	May 13, 1996	Kitt Peak	Spacewatch	NYS	940 m	MPC · JPL
454538	2014 OW_{333}	—	April 10, 2013	Mount Lemmon	Mount Lemmon Survey	EOS	1.8 km	MPC · JPL
454539	2014 OE_{334}	—	April 23, 2009	Mount Lemmon	Mount Lemmon Survey	·	2.0 km	MPC · JPL
454540	2014 OF_{334}	—	March 31, 2010	WISE	WISE	PHO	1.2 km	MPC · JPL
454541	2014 OA_{336}	—	September 20, 2006	Catalina	CSS	KON	2.8 km	MPC · JPL
454542	2014 OS_{341}	—	January 15, 2004	Kitt Peak	Spacewatch	·	1.2 km	MPC · JPL
454543	2014 OK_{342}	—	April 1, 2008	Kitt Peak	Spacewatch	·	1.7 km	MPC · JPL
454544	2014 ON_{351}	—	June 2, 2014	Mount Lemmon	Mount Lemmon Survey	·	2.3 km	MPC · JPL
454545	2014 OE_{353}	—	September 10, 2010	Kitt Peak	Spacewatch	·	1.7 km	MPC · JPL
454546	2014 OP_{354}	—	September 29, 2011	Mount Lemmon	Mount Lemmon Survey	·	850 m	MPC · JPL
454547	2014 OA_{355}	—	January 5, 2006	Kitt Peak	Spacewatch	·	1.8 km	MPC · JPL
454548	2014 OT_{364}	—	September 12, 2005	Kitt Peak	Spacewatch	·	1.9 km	MPC · JPL
454549	2014 ON_{377}	—	November 2, 2005	Mount Lemmon	Mount Lemmon Survey	·	1.7 km	MPC · JPL
454550	2014 OG_{385}	—	August 10, 2010	Kitt Peak	Spacewatch	·	1.2 km	MPC · JPL
454551	2014 OJ_{385}	—	September 16, 2010	Kitt Peak	Spacewatch	·	1.5 km	MPC · JPL
454552	2014 OU_{385}	—	December 9, 2010	Kitt Peak	Spacewatch	·	3.6 km	MPC · JPL
454553	2014 OZ_{385}	—	October 23, 2006	Kitt Peak	Spacewatch	·	2.1 km	MPC · JPL
454554	2014 OA_{386}	—	October 17, 2010	Mount Lemmon	Mount Lemmon Survey	HOF	2.5 km	MPC · JPL
454555	2014 OB_{386}	—	July 6, 2005	Kitt Peak	Spacewatch	·	2.4 km	MPC · JPL
454556	2014 OS_{388}	—	February 21, 2009	Kitt Peak	Spacewatch	·	900 m	MPC · JPL
454557	2014 OY_{388}	—	November 5, 2010	Mount Lemmon	Mount Lemmon Survey	·	2.5 km	MPC · JPL
454558	2014 OZ_{388}	—	December 25, 2005	Mount Lemmon	Mount Lemmon Survey	EOS	1.6 km	MPC · JPL
454559	2014 PF	—	April 9, 2010	Catalina	CSS	·	1.6 km	MPC · JPL
454560	2014 PH_{1}	—	April 1, 2013	Mount Lemmon	Mount Lemmon Survey	·	990 m	MPC · JPL
454561	2014 PK_{2}	—	September 15, 2006	Kitt Peak	Spacewatch	·	1.0 km	MPC · JPL
454562	2014 PN_{2}	—	November 11, 2010	Mount Lemmon	Mount Lemmon Survey	KOR	1.1 km	MPC · JPL
454563	2014 PS_{3}	—	March 18, 2002	Kitt Peak	Spacewatch	MAS	820 m	MPC · JPL
454564	2014 PW_{5}	—	June 14, 2010	WISE	WISE	ADE	2.5 km	MPC · JPL
454565	2014 PC_{6}	—	October 9, 1999	Kitt Peak	Spacewatch	·	1.1 km	MPC · JPL
454566	2014 PM_{6}	—	November 7, 2010	Mount Lemmon	Mount Lemmon Survey	EOS	2.0 km	MPC · JPL
454567	2014 PS_{7}	—	October 31, 2006	Mount Lemmon	Mount Lemmon Survey	·	1.4 km	MPC · JPL
454568	2014 PV_{7}	—	September 8, 2010	Kitt Peak	Spacewatch	·	1.4 km	MPC · JPL
454569	2014 PR_{8}	—	November 12, 2010	Catalina	CSS	·	2.1 km	MPC · JPL
454570	2014 PE_{9}	—	September 22, 2003	Kitt Peak	Spacewatch	THM	1.6 km	MPC · JPL
454571	2014 PK_{9}	—	October 19, 2011	Mount Lemmon	Mount Lemmon Survey	·	750 m	MPC · JPL
454572	2014 PZ_{10}	—	April 2, 2005	Kitt Peak	Spacewatch	·	910 m	MPC · JPL
454573	2014 PO_{13}	—	February 27, 2006	Mount Lemmon	Mount Lemmon Survey	NYS	980 m	MPC · JPL
454574	2014 PS_{14}	—	February 1, 2012	Mount Lemmon	Mount Lemmon Survey	·	3.4 km	MPC · JPL
454575	2014 PD_{16}	—	September 4, 2010	Kitt Peak	Spacewatch	·	1.2 km	MPC · JPL
454576	2014 PZ_{16}	—	September 21, 2009	Kitt Peak	Spacewatch	·	3.6 km	MPC · JPL
454577	2014 PE_{18}	—	December 10, 2010	Kitt Peak	Spacewatch	·	1.9 km	MPC · JPL
454578	2014 PG_{18}	—	October 5, 2004	Kitt Peak	Spacewatch	·	2.0 km	MPC · JPL
454579	2014 PW_{19}	—	March 25, 2006	Mount Lemmon	Mount Lemmon Survey	MAS	660 m	MPC · JPL
454580	2014 PG_{22}	—	October 29, 2005	Mount Lemmon	Mount Lemmon Survey	KOR	1.2 km	MPC · JPL
454581	2014 PU_{24}	—	February 15, 1997	Kitt Peak	Spacewatch	PHO	1.1 km	MPC · JPL
454582	2014 PV_{24}	—	February 25, 2006	Kitt Peak	Spacewatch	·	3.7 km	MPC · JPL
454583	2014 PW_{25}	—	January 27, 2006	Mount Lemmon	Mount Lemmon Survey	·	2.7 km	MPC · JPL
454584	2014 PN_{26}	—	January 4, 2006	Kitt Peak	Spacewatch	EOS	1.7 km	MPC · JPL
454585	2014 PZ_{28}	—	January 21, 2006	Kitt Peak	Spacewatch	·	1.8 km	MPC · JPL
454586	2014 PM_{30}	—	October 22, 2009	Mount Lemmon	Mount Lemmon Survey	THM	2.1 km	MPC · JPL
454587	2014 PA_{33}	—	February 28, 2008	Mount Lemmon	Mount Lemmon Survey	MRX	910 m	MPC · JPL
454588	2014 PZ_{35}	—	November 1, 2010	Mount Lemmon	Mount Lemmon Survey	AST	1.6 km	MPC · JPL
454589	2014 PX_{37}	—	September 24, 2009	Mount Lemmon	Mount Lemmon Survey	·	2.1 km	MPC · JPL
454590	2014 PJ_{39}	—	February 25, 2007	Mount Lemmon	Mount Lemmon Survey	·	2.0 km	MPC · JPL
454591	2014 PW_{41}	—	October 16, 2009	Catalina	CSS	EOS	2.1 km	MPC · JPL
454592	2014 PT_{42}	—	May 15, 2009	Kitt Peak	Spacewatch	EUN	1.0 km	MPC · JPL
454593	2014 PC_{44}	—	March 27, 2010	WISE	WISE	ULA · CYB	4.9 km	MPC · JPL
454594	2014 PV_{44}	—	September 14, 2007	Mount Lemmon	Mount Lemmon Survey	·	1.1 km	MPC · JPL
454595	2014 PK_{47}	—	September 2, 2010	Mount Lemmon	Mount Lemmon Survey	EUN	1.2 km	MPC · JPL
454596	2014 PC_{48}	—	March 18, 1998	Kitt Peak	Spacewatch	MAS	780 m	MPC · JPL
454597	2014 PV_{49}	—	January 22, 1998	Kitt Peak	Spacewatch	·	1.8 km	MPC · JPL
454598	2014 PE_{57}	—	July 7, 2010	WISE	WISE	·	2.0 km	MPC · JPL
454599	2014 PF_{58}	—	November 9, 2007	Kitt Peak	Spacewatch	3:2 · SHU	4.9 km	MPC · JPL
454600	2014 PT_{62}	—	February 27, 2006	Kitt Peak	Spacewatch	MAS	640 m	MPC · JPL

== 454601–454700 ==
back to top

Designation			Discovery			Properties		Ref
Permanent	Provisional	Named after	Date	Site	Discoverer(s)	Category	Diam.	Ref
454601	2014 PM_{65}	—	May 19, 2004	Kitt Peak	Spacewatch	·	2.2 km	MPC · JPL
454602	2014 PB_{66}	—	October 22, 2009	Mount Lemmon	Mount Lemmon Survey	·	2.0 km	MPC · JPL
454603	2014 PF_{66}	—	October 14, 2001	Kitt Peak	Spacewatch	(12739)	1.7 km	MPC · JPL
454604	2014 QJ_{15}	—	December 10, 2004	Kitt Peak	Spacewatch	·	3.5 km	MPC · JPL
454605	2014 QN_{19}	—	September 19, 2003	Kitt Peak	Spacewatch	·	1.3 km	MPC · JPL
454606	2014 QD_{22}	—	November 8, 2009	Mount Lemmon	Mount Lemmon Survey	·	2.6 km	MPC · JPL
454607	2014 QX_{26}	—	April 5, 2000	Socorro	LINEAR	·	1.5 km	MPC · JPL
454608	2014 QL_{27}	—	September 22, 2009	Kitt Peak	Spacewatch	·	1.9 km	MPC · JPL
454609	2014 QN_{30}	—	February 3, 2010	WISE	WISE	·	4.3 km	MPC · JPL
454610	2014 QD_{35}	—	October 13, 2005	Kitt Peak	Spacewatch	(16286)	1.5 km	MPC · JPL
454611	2014 QP_{40}	—	September 26, 2009	Kitt Peak	Spacewatch	·	2.2 km	MPC · JPL
454612	2014 QW_{44}	—	September 23, 2011	Kitt Peak	Spacewatch	·	1.1 km	MPC · JPL
454613	2014 QO_{45}	—	February 13, 2004	Kitt Peak	Spacewatch	·	1.5 km	MPC · JPL
454614	2014 QU_{45}	—	August 19, 2006	Kitt Peak	Spacewatch	·	990 m	MPC · JPL
454615	2014 QX_{46}	—	October 15, 2004	Mount Lemmon	Mount Lemmon Survey	·	2.1 km	MPC · JPL
454616	2014 QN_{59}	—	January 20, 2012	Mount Lemmon	Mount Lemmon Survey	·	1.7 km	MPC · JPL
454617	2014 QR_{66}	—	September 11, 2010	Mount Lemmon	Mount Lemmon Survey	·	1.4 km	MPC · JPL
454618	2014 QY_{72}	—	August 1, 2003	Socorro	LINEAR	·	4.7 km	MPC · JPL
454619	2014 QT_{90}	—	September 17, 2009	Mount Lemmon	Mount Lemmon Survey	EOS	1.4 km	MPC · JPL
454620	2014 QF_{105}	—	July 6, 2005	Kitt Peak	Spacewatch	·	1.4 km	MPC · JPL
454621	2014 QE_{117}	—	September 4, 2008	Kitt Peak	Spacewatch	·	3.2 km	MPC · JPL
454622	2014 QM_{119}	—	January 26, 2011	Mount Lemmon	Mount Lemmon Survey	·	2.5 km	MPC · JPL
454623	2014 QV_{126}	—	September 18, 2009	Kitt Peak	Spacewatch	·	2.1 km	MPC · JPL
454624	2014 QG_{130}	—	October 7, 2004	Kitt Peak	Spacewatch	·	1.7 km	MPC · JPL
454625	2014 QD_{132}	—	October 28, 2005	Kitt Peak	Spacewatch	KOR	1.2 km	MPC · JPL
454626	2014 QT_{132}	—	September 15, 2009	Kitt Peak	Spacewatch	THM	2.1 km	MPC · JPL
454627	2014 QO_{133}	—	October 22, 2009	Mount Lemmon	Mount Lemmon Survey	·	3.6 km	MPC · JPL
454628	2014 QX_{135}	—	September 15, 2009	Kitt Peak	Spacewatch	·	2.2 km	MPC · JPL
454629	2014 QA_{143}	—	June 15, 2013	Mount Lemmon	Mount Lemmon Survey	·	2.6 km	MPC · JPL
454630	2014 QD_{168}	—	April 25, 2006	Kitt Peak	Spacewatch	·	6.8 km	MPC · JPL
454631	2014 QR_{173}	—	September 23, 2008	Kitt Peak	Spacewatch	CYB	2.8 km	MPC · JPL
454632	2014 QV_{175}	—	February 10, 2008	Kitt Peak	Spacewatch	·	2.0 km	MPC · JPL
454633	2014 QE_{179}	—	September 12, 2007	Catalina	CSS	·	1.1 km	MPC · JPL
454634	2014 QT_{181}	—	February 19, 2009	Mount Lemmon	Mount Lemmon Survey	·	1.1 km	MPC · JPL
454635	2014 QK_{188}	—	March 15, 2012	Kitt Peak	Spacewatch	·	2.6 km	MPC · JPL
454636	2014 QV_{194}	—	January 15, 2008	Mount Lemmon	Mount Lemmon Survey	·	1.1 km	MPC · JPL
454637	2014 QM_{201}	—	October 11, 2010	Mount Lemmon	Mount Lemmon Survey	HOF	2.1 km	MPC · JPL
454638	2014 QL_{207}	—	October 1, 2005	Mount Lemmon	Mount Lemmon Survey	·	1.5 km	MPC · JPL
454639	2014 QZ_{213}	—	October 20, 2003	Kitt Peak	Spacewatch	·	1.6 km	MPC · JPL
454640	2014 QU_{215}	—	April 25, 2004	Kitt Peak	Spacewatch	·	1.6 km	MPC · JPL
454641	2014 QB_{219}	—	September 15, 2009	Kitt Peak	Spacewatch	VER	2.5 km	MPC · JPL
454642	2014 QK_{220}	—	June 13, 2004	Kitt Peak	Spacewatch	·	810 m	MPC · JPL
454643	2014 QP_{237}	—	October 17, 2003	Kitt Peak	Spacewatch	·	3.4 km	MPC · JPL
454644	2014 QK_{244}	—	December 28, 2005	Kitt Peak	Spacewatch	EOS	2.3 km	MPC · JPL
454645	2014 QL_{247}	—	May 11, 2007	Mount Lemmon	Mount Lemmon Survey	·	3.8 km	MPC · JPL
454646	2014 QY_{253}	—	January 11, 2011	Kitt Peak	Spacewatch	·	3.5 km	MPC · JPL
454647	2014 QU_{257}	—	November 9, 2009	Mount Lemmon	Mount Lemmon Survey	·	2.9 km	MPC · JPL
454648	2014 QE_{266}	—	September 3, 2010	Mount Lemmon	Mount Lemmon Survey	·	1.3 km	MPC · JPL
454649	2014 QB_{267}	—	September 18, 2003	Kitt Peak	Spacewatch	EOS	1.7 km	MPC · JPL
454650	2014 QK_{273}	—	October 16, 2006	Kitt Peak	Spacewatch	·	1.5 km	MPC · JPL
454651	2014 QZ_{276}	—	November 4, 1996	Kitt Peak	Spacewatch	V	770 m	MPC · JPL
454652	2014 QX_{278}	—	November 19, 2006	Catalina	CSS	·	1.5 km	MPC · JPL
454653	2014 QE_{298}	—	August 4, 2003	Kitt Peak	Spacewatch	·	3.2 km	MPC · JPL
454654	2014 QB_{301}	—	November 7, 2010	Mount Lemmon	Mount Lemmon Survey	·	2.5 km	MPC · JPL
454655	2014 QW_{303}	—	January 9, 2006	Kitt Peak	Spacewatch	EOS	1.5 km	MPC · JPL
454656	2014 QV_{305}	—	September 16, 2003	Kitt Peak	Spacewatch	·	2.0 km	MPC · JPL
454657	2014 QG_{314}	—	October 11, 1999	Kitt Peak	Spacewatch	·	1.5 km	MPC · JPL
454658	2014 QH_{317}	—	February 28, 2008	Mount Lemmon	Mount Lemmon Survey	·	1.6 km	MPC · JPL
454659	2014 QW_{319}	—	December 2, 2005	Kitt Peak	Spacewatch	·	1.8 km	MPC · JPL
454660	2014 QX_{323}	—	August 18, 2009	Kitt Peak	Spacewatch	·	1.7 km	MPC · JPL
454661	2014 QN_{336}	—	September 4, 2008	Kitt Peak	Spacewatch	·	3.5 km	MPC · JPL
454662	2014 QM_{337}	—	September 17, 1998	Kitt Peak	Spacewatch	·	2.0 km	MPC · JPL
454663	2014 QT_{337}	—	January 2, 2012	Kitt Peak	Spacewatch	·	2.6 km	MPC · JPL
454664	2014 QB_{346}	—	November 19, 2007	Mount Lemmon	Mount Lemmon Survey	·	3.3 km	MPC · JPL
454665	2014 QP_{349}	—	October 14, 2010	Mount Lemmon	Mount Lemmon Survey	AST	1.6 km	MPC · JPL
454666	2014 QB_{370}	—	February 1, 2000	Kitt Peak	Spacewatch	·	3.4 km	MPC · JPL
454667	2014 QM_{370}	—	March 27, 1995	Kitt Peak	Spacewatch	·	1.6 km	MPC · JPL
454668	2014 QY_{370}	—	March 29, 2008	Mount Lemmon	Mount Lemmon Survey	·	1.6 km	MPC · JPL
454669	2014 QA_{371}	—	October 2, 2006	Mount Lemmon	Mount Lemmon Survey	·	1.1 km	MPC · JPL
454670	2014 QB_{376}	—	March 14, 2007	Mount Lemmon	Mount Lemmon Survey	·	3.1 km	MPC · JPL
454671	2014 QS_{377}	—	November 20, 2006	Kitt Peak	Spacewatch	·	1.6 km	MPC · JPL
454672	2014 QZ_{377}	—	January 17, 2007	Kitt Peak	Spacewatch	·	1.9 km	MPC · JPL
454673	2014 QD_{378}	—	April 15, 1997	Kitt Peak	Spacewatch	·	1.5 km	MPC · JPL
454674	2014 QF_{386}	—	December 14, 2004	Kitt Peak	Spacewatch	EOS	1.7 km	MPC · JPL
454675	2014 QZ_{387}	—	March 3, 2005	Kitt Peak	Spacewatch	·	1.4 km	MPC · JPL
454676	2014 QD_{402}	—	June 4, 2013	Mount Lemmon	Mount Lemmon Survey	·	2.4 km	MPC · JPL
454677	2014 QX_{402}	—	September 29, 2009	Mount Lemmon	Mount Lemmon Survey	·	2.1 km	MPC · JPL
454678	2014 QL_{410}	—	February 13, 2010	WISE	WISE	·	2.7 km	MPC · JPL
454679	2014 QQ_{414}	—	September 12, 2005	Kitt Peak	Spacewatch	AGN	1.0 km	MPC · JPL
454680	2014 QG_{418}	—	May 7, 2002	Kitt Peak	Spacewatch	·	2.6 km	MPC · JPL
454681	2014 QB_{425}	—	October 29, 2010	Mount Lemmon	Mount Lemmon Survey	·	1.6 km	MPC · JPL
454682	2014 QR_{426}	—	October 1, 2003	Kitt Peak	Spacewatch	V	890 m	MPC · JPL
454683	2014 QA_{437}	—	October 1, 2005	Anderson Mesa	LONEOS	·	2.3 km	MPC · JPL
454684	2014 QZ_{439}	—	November 11, 2004	Kitt Peak	Spacewatch	·	2.9 km	MPC · JPL
454685	2014 RL_{3}	—	August 28, 2005	Kitt Peak	Spacewatch	·	1.6 km	MPC · JPL
454686	2014 RX_{4}	—	June 1, 1997	Kitt Peak	Spacewatch	·	2.7 km	MPC · JPL
454687	2014 RR_{16}	—	October 2, 2009	Mount Lemmon	Mount Lemmon Survey	·	4.9 km	MPC · JPL
454688	2014 RF_{20}	—	January 23, 2006	Kitt Peak	Spacewatch	EOS	1.8 km	MPC · JPL
454689	2014 RJ_{21}	—	March 26, 2004	Kitt Peak	Spacewatch	·	1.8 km	MPC · JPL
454690	2014 RW_{21}	—	June 20, 2006	Mount Lemmon	Mount Lemmon Survey	T_{j} (2.98)	3.8 km	MPC · JPL
454691	2014 RE_{22}	—	March 2, 2008	Mount Lemmon	Mount Lemmon Survey	·	1.5 km	MPC · JPL
454692	2014 RN_{24}	—	October 6, 2005	Kitt Peak	Spacewatch	·	1.9 km	MPC · JPL
454693	2014 RP_{34}	—	January 23, 2011	Mount Lemmon	Mount Lemmon Survey	·	2.6 km	MPC · JPL
454694	2014 RC_{35}	—	May 13, 2007	Mount Lemmon	Mount Lemmon Survey	·	3.3 km	MPC · JPL
454695	2014 RQ_{35}	—	January 13, 2005	Kitt Peak	Spacewatch	·	3.1 km	MPC · JPL
454696	2014 SF_{12}	—	October 12, 1998	Kitt Peak	Spacewatch	·	2.7 km	MPC · JPL
454697	2014 SX_{48}	—	March 26, 2007	Kitt Peak	Spacewatch	·	3.2 km	MPC · JPL
454698	2014 SW_{52}	—	December 10, 2006	Kitt Peak	Spacewatch	(17392)	1.6 km	MPC · JPL
454699	2014 SZ_{90}	—	May 29, 2008	Mount Lemmon	Mount Lemmon Survey	·	2.8 km	MPC · JPL
454700	2014 SP_{91}	—	August 19, 2003	Campo Imperatore	CINEOS	·	2.1 km	MPC · JPL

== 454701–454800 ==
back to top

Designation			Discovery			Properties		Ref
Permanent	Provisional	Named after	Date	Site	Discoverer(s)	Category	Diam.	Ref
454701	2014 SV_{92}	—	October 2, 2005	Mount Lemmon	Mount Lemmon Survey	DOR	2.3 km	MPC · JPL
454702	2014 SZ_{100}	—	September 7, 2004	Kitt Peak	Spacewatch	KOR	1.2 km	MPC · JPL
454703	2014 SP_{102}	—	March 13, 2005	Kitt Peak	Spacewatch	·	1.4 km	MPC · JPL
454704	2014 SZ_{103}	—	November 19, 2009	Mount Lemmon	Mount Lemmon Survey	·	2.2 km	MPC · JPL
454705	2014 SJ_{107}	—	September 15, 2009	Kitt Peak	Spacewatch	·	2.1 km	MPC · JPL
454706	2014 SO_{111}	—	September 19, 2003	Kitt Peak	Spacewatch	THM	2.0 km	MPC · JPL
454707	2014 SU_{114}	—	November 15, 1995	Kitt Peak	Spacewatch	KOR	1.2 km	MPC · JPL
454708	2014 SS_{117}	—	December 30, 2005	Kitt Peak	Spacewatch	·	1.7 km	MPC · JPL
454709	2014 SS_{124}	—	December 19, 2004	Mount Lemmon	Mount Lemmon Survey	THM	2.5 km	MPC · JPL
454710	2014 SX_{125}	—	August 23, 2004	Kitt Peak	Spacewatch	KOR	1.3 km	MPC · JPL
454711	2014 SP_{130}	—	March 2, 2006	Kitt Peak	Spacewatch	·	2.7 km	MPC · JPL
454712	2014 SZ_{158}	—	September 28, 2003	Kitt Peak	Spacewatch	·	2.8 km	MPC · JPL
454713	2014 SK_{162}	—	April 15, 2007	Mount Lemmon	Mount Lemmon Survey	·	2.3 km	MPC · JPL
454714	2014 SR_{172}	—	October 25, 2005	Mount Lemmon	Mount Lemmon Survey	·	1.8 km	MPC · JPL
454715	2014 SW_{178}	—	September 30, 2003	Kitt Peak	Spacewatch	·	4.8 km	MPC · JPL
454716	2014 SN_{189}	—	September 16, 2009	Mount Lemmon	Mount Lemmon Survey	EOS	1.8 km	MPC · JPL
454717	2014 SM_{212}	—	September 23, 2008	Kitt Peak	Spacewatch	·	3.6 km	MPC · JPL
454718	2014 SY_{220}	—	October 19, 2006	Catalina	CSS	ADE	2.7 km	MPC · JPL
454719	2014 SS_{222}	—	March 16, 2010	WISE	WISE	·	4.4 km	MPC · JPL
454720	2014 SV_{222}	—	March 6, 2008	Mount Lemmon	Mount Lemmon Survey	·	1.8 km	MPC · JPL
454721	2014 SJ_{223}	—	October 14, 2009	Mount Lemmon	Mount Lemmon Survey	·	3.0 km	MPC · JPL
454722	2014 SN_{223}	—	November 16, 2006	Catalina	CSS	MAR	1.4 km	MPC · JPL
454723	2014 SF_{264}	—	September 7, 2004	Kitt Peak	Spacewatch	KOR	1.0 km	MPC · JPL
454724	2014 ST_{265}	—	July 1, 2008	Kitt Peak	Spacewatch	EOS	2.7 km	MPC · JPL
454725	2014 SB_{267}	—	January 14, 2011	Kitt Peak	Spacewatch	·	3.9 km	MPC · JPL
454726	2014 SB_{278}	—	November 9, 2009	Mount Lemmon	Mount Lemmon Survey	EOS	2.3 km	MPC · JPL
454727	2014 SQ_{289}	—	October 17, 2010	Mount Lemmon	Mount Lemmon Survey	·	1.8 km	MPC · JPL
454728	2014 TR_{12}	—	October 23, 2003	Kitt Peak	Spacewatch	·	3.4 km	MPC · JPL
454729	2014 TR_{37}	—	October 5, 2003	Kitt Peak	Spacewatch	URS	2.8 km	MPC · JPL
454730	2014 TY_{41}	—	April 19, 2007	Kitt Peak	Spacewatch	·	2.4 km	MPC · JPL
454731	2014 TZ_{63}	—	September 20, 2009	Mount Lemmon	Mount Lemmon Survey	·	2.2 km	MPC · JPL
454732	2014 TW_{81}	—	December 6, 2005	Kitt Peak	Spacewatch	·	3.7 km	MPC · JPL
454733	2014 TO_{85}	—	October 2, 2003	Haleakala	NEAT	·	5.8 km	MPC · JPL
454734	2014 UL_{8}	—	November 28, 2000	Kitt Peak	Spacewatch	·	2.9 km	MPC · JPL
454735	2014 UM_{13}	—	June 23, 2011	Kitt Peak	Spacewatch	L5	9.4 km	MPC · JPL
454736	2014 UW_{17}	—	October 28, 2005	Mount Lemmon	Mount Lemmon Survey	HOF	3.1 km	MPC · JPL
454737	2014 UL_{18}	—	April 14, 2010	WISE	WISE	·	2.9 km	MPC · JPL
454738	2014 US_{89}	—	March 26, 2011	Mount Lemmon	Mount Lemmon Survey	EOS	2.3 km	MPC · JPL
454739	2014 UC_{92}	—	November 16, 2009	Kitt Peak	Spacewatch	·	2.0 km	MPC · JPL
454740	2014 UX_{92}	—	March 24, 2006	Mount Lemmon	Mount Lemmon Survey	·	4.0 km	MPC · JPL
454741	2014 UB_{106}	—	November 27, 2009	Kitt Peak	Spacewatch	·	3.1 km	MPC · JPL
454742	2014 UW_{124}	—	August 30, 2002	Anderson Mesa	LONEOS	PHO	1.6 km	MPC · JPL
454743	2014 UH_{126}	—	April 16, 2007	Siding Spring	SSS	BRA	2.3 km	MPC · JPL
454744	2014 UL_{133}	—	April 4, 2008	Kitt Peak	Spacewatch	L5	9.1 km	MPC · JPL
454745	2014 UT_{140}	—	March 19, 2001	Kitt Peak	Spacewatch	·	3.2 km	MPC · JPL
454746	2014 UA_{187}	—	October 22, 2003	Kitt Peak	Spacewatch	·	3.4 km	MPC · JPL
454747	2014 UX_{194}	—	November 9, 2009	Mount Lemmon	Mount Lemmon Survey	EOS	2.7 km	MPC · JPL
454748	2014 UA_{204}	—	November 14, 2007	Kitt Peak	Spacewatch	PHO	2.5 km	MPC · JPL
454749	2014 UG_{204}	—	November 26, 2005	Kitt Peak	Spacewatch	·	2.9 km	MPC · JPL
454750	2014 UP_{216}	—	January 15, 2005	Kitt Peak	Spacewatch	·	4.4 km	MPC · JPL
454751	2014 VU_{5}	—	November 19, 2009	Kitt Peak	Spacewatch	·	3.4 km	MPC · JPL
454752	2014 VU_{9}	—	April 11, 2008	Mount Lemmon	Mount Lemmon Survey	L5	10 km	MPC · JPL
454753	2014 VQ_{12}	—	March 30, 2008	Kitt Peak	Spacewatch	L5	9.1 km	MPC · JPL
454754	2014 VP_{15}	—	March 6, 2010	WISE	WISE	·	4.8 km	MPC · JPL
454755	2014 VZ_{16}	—	July 30, 2008	Mount Lemmon	Mount Lemmon Survey	THM	2.3 km	MPC · JPL
454756	2014 WV_{6}	—	April 27, 2009	Mount Lemmon	Mount Lemmon Survey	L5	8.0 km	MPC · JPL
454757	2014 WD_{23}	—	October 2, 2003	Kitt Peak	Spacewatch	·	3.7 km	MPC · JPL
454758	2014 WV_{23}	—	December 21, 2006	Kitt Peak	Spacewatch	·	1.3 km	MPC · JPL
454759	2014 WG_{32}	—	June 16, 2007	Kitt Peak	Spacewatch	·	3.7 km	MPC · JPL
454760	2014 WF_{48}	—	April 18, 2006	Anderson Mesa	LONEOS	·	3.0 km	MPC · JPL
454761	2014 WX_{67}	—	October 31, 2005	Mount Lemmon	Mount Lemmon Survey	·	1.9 km	MPC · JPL
454762	2014 WU_{115}	—	March 25, 2006	Kitt Peak	Spacewatch	·	2.7 km	MPC · JPL
454763	2014 WJ_{116}	—	March 29, 2008	Kitt Peak	Spacewatch	·	1.7 km	MPC · JPL
454764	2014 WW_{172}	—	September 10, 2010	Kitt Peak	Spacewatch	·	2.9 km	MPC · JPL
454765	2014 WJ_{213}	—	November 19, 2003	Kitt Peak	Spacewatch	·	3.5 km	MPC · JPL
454766	2014 WF_{228}	—	March 18, 2004	Kitt Peak	Spacewatch	(5)	1.1 km	MPC · JPL
454767	2014 WV_{235}	—	January 31, 2006	Kitt Peak	Spacewatch	·	5.6 km	MPC · JPL
454768	2014 WN_{237}	—	July 30, 2008	Mount Lemmon	Mount Lemmon Survey	·	5.1 km	MPC · JPL
454769	2014 WC_{243}	—	August 31, 2005	Anderson Mesa	LONEOS	·	2.6 km	MPC · JPL
454770	2014 WE_{253}	—	August 13, 2009	Siding Spring	SSS	·	2.3 km	MPC · JPL
454771	2014 WR_{277}	—	December 1, 1994	Kitt Peak	Spacewatch	·	2.1 km	MPC · JPL
454772	2014 WK_{288}	—	June 16, 2006	Kitt Peak	Spacewatch	·	3.5 km	MPC · JPL
454773	2014 WO_{318}	—	November 26, 2009	Mount Lemmon	Mount Lemmon Survey	·	3.5 km	MPC · JPL
454774	2014 WR_{320}	—	March 5, 2006	Kitt Peak	Spacewatch	·	2.2 km	MPC · JPL
454775	2014 WH_{400}	—	August 21, 2008	Kitt Peak	Spacewatch	·	4.1 km	MPC · JPL
454776	2014 WL_{400}	—	January 13, 2005	Kitt Peak	Spacewatch	·	4.0 km	MPC · JPL
454777	2014 WA_{423}	—	May 25, 2006	Mount Lemmon	Mount Lemmon Survey	·	4.8 km	MPC · JPL
454778	2014 WE_{464}	—	October 9, 2008	Mount Lemmon	Mount Lemmon Survey	EOS	2.1 km	MPC · JPL
454779	2014 XZ_{3}	—	October 30, 2005	Catalina	CSS	·	3.6 km	MPC · JPL
454780	2014 XE_{6}	—	March 1, 2010	WISE	WISE	·	4.1 km	MPC · JPL
454781	2014 XK_{11}	—	April 10, 2010	WISE	WISE	L5	10 km	MPC · JPL
454782	2014 XY_{28}	—	November 25, 2009	Kitt Peak	Spacewatch	·	4.0 km	MPC · JPL
454783	2014 YR_{16}	—	December 19, 2009	Kitt Peak	Spacewatch	EOS	2.1 km	MPC · JPL
454784	2014 YD_{21}	—	December 17, 2009	Mount Lemmon	Mount Lemmon Survey	·	2.5 km	MPC · JPL
454785	2014 YW_{25}	—	October 26, 2008	Mount Lemmon	Mount Lemmon Survey	·	2.9 km	MPC · JPL
454786	2015 AJ_{1}	—	September 8, 1996	Kitt Peak	Spacewatch	·	1.8 km	MPC · JPL
454787	2015 NW_{6}	—	December 12, 2012	Mount Lemmon	Mount Lemmon Survey	·	1.1 km	MPC · JPL
454788	2015 OT_{24}	—	December 30, 2008	Kitt Peak	Spacewatch	NYS	1.5 km	MPC · JPL
454789	2015 OQ_{27}	—	September 14, 2005	Catalina	CSS	·	940 m	MPC · JPL
454790	2015 OF_{36}	—	July 30, 2008	Mount Lemmon	Mount Lemmon Survey	·	1.1 km	MPC · JPL
454791	2015 OU_{76}	—	December 5, 2008	Mount Lemmon	Mount Lemmon Survey	V	720 m	MPC · JPL
454792	2015 PT_{10}	—	June 8, 2010	WISE	WISE	·	1.6 km	MPC · JPL
454793	2015 PL_{12}	—	September 8, 2000	Kitt Peak	Spacewatch	·	1.6 km	MPC · JPL
454794	2015 PZ_{218}	—	October 11, 2006	Kitt Peak	Spacewatch	GEF	930 m	MPC · JPL
454795	2015 PO_{275}	—	March 10, 2011	Kitt Peak	Spacewatch	·	710 m	MPC · JPL
454796	2015 QO_{7}	—	April 4, 2003	Kitt Peak	Spacewatch	·	1.3 km	MPC · JPL
454797	2015 QM_{9}	—	October 31, 2006	Mount Lemmon	Mount Lemmon Survey	KOR	1.4 km	MPC · JPL
454798	2015 QU_{10}	—	April 23, 2010	WISE	WISE	DOR	2.4 km	MPC · JPL
454799	2015 QV_{10}	—	September 5, 2010	Mount Lemmon	Mount Lemmon Survey	·	2.3 km	MPC · JPL
454800	2015 RY_{1}	—	April 12, 2010	Mount Lemmon	Mount Lemmon Survey	PHO	1.0 km	MPC · JPL

== 454801–454900 ==
back to top

Designation			Discovery			Properties		Ref
Permanent	Provisional	Named after	Date	Site	Discoverer(s)	Category	Diam.	Ref
454801	2015 RK_{28}	—	October 29, 2006	Mount Lemmon	Mount Lemmon Survey	·	2.6 km	MPC · JPL
454802	2015 RA_{34}	—	January 5, 2003	Socorro	LINEAR	·	2.5 km	MPC · JPL
454803	2015 RE_{38}	—	November 18, 2006	Kitt Peak	Spacewatch	KOR	1.5 km	MPC · JPL
454804	2015 RH_{53}	—	October 15, 2004	Kitt Peak	Spacewatch	NYS	1.1 km	MPC · JPL
454805	2015 RY_{53}	—	October 2, 2003	Kitt Peak	Spacewatch	·	620 m	MPC · JPL
454806	2015 RH_{60}	—	September 15, 2004	Kitt Peak	Spacewatch	·	2.3 km	MPC · JPL
454807	2015 RS_{61}	—	January 30, 2006	Kitt Peak	Spacewatch	·	2.8 km	MPC · JPL
454808	2015 RJ_{73}	—	October 30, 2005	Mount Lemmon	Mount Lemmon Survey	·	720 m	MPC · JPL
454809	2015 RU_{73}	—	October 20, 2007	Kitt Peak	Spacewatch	·	830 m	MPC · JPL
454810	2015 RY_{89}	—	December 7, 2004	Socorro	LINEAR	THB	3.0 km	MPC · JPL
454811	2015 RP_{93}	—	November 20, 2003	Kitt Peak	Spacewatch	·	1.4 km	MPC · JPL
454812	2015 RV_{94}	—	September 26, 2005	Kitt Peak	Spacewatch	·	2.4 km	MPC · JPL
454813	2015 RB_{96}	—	October 9, 2004	Kitt Peak	Spacewatch	·	1.3 km	MPC · JPL
454814	2015 RH_{99}	—	November 11, 2010	Catalina	CSS	VER	3.6 km	MPC · JPL
454815	2015 RG_{102}	—	September 30, 2000	Kitt Peak	Spacewatch	·	1.3 km	MPC · JPL
454816	2015 RQ_{102}	—	November 1, 2000	Kitt Peak	Spacewatch	MAS	810 m	MPC · JPL
454817	2015 RC_{106}	—	December 30, 2008	Mount Lemmon	Mount Lemmon Survey	·	1.0 km	MPC · JPL
454818	2015 RO_{106}	—	November 1, 2007	Kitt Peak	Spacewatch	(5)	1.1 km	MPC · JPL
454819	2015 RM_{107}	—	December 22, 2008	Kitt Peak	Spacewatch	·	980 m	MPC · JPL
454820	2015 RH_{108}	—	September 11, 2004	Kitt Peak	Spacewatch	·	2.2 km	MPC · JPL
454821	2015 RH_{115}	—	October 24, 2005	Kitt Peak	Spacewatch	·	2.7 km	MPC · JPL
454822	2015 RT_{116}	—	April 29, 2008	Kitt Peak	Spacewatch	·	2.9 km	MPC · JPL
454823	2015 RA_{117}	—	January 29, 1995	Kitt Peak	Spacewatch	·	3.8 km	MPC · JPL
454824	2015 RB_{117}	—	November 6, 2010	Mount Lemmon	Mount Lemmon Survey	VER	3.6 km	MPC · JPL
454825	2015 RS_{118}	—	September 12, 2001	Socorro	LINEAR	·	1.1 km	MPC · JPL
454826	2015 RB_{134}	—	February 7, 2008	Kitt Peak	Spacewatch	·	1.8 km	MPC · JPL
454827	2015 RJ_{145}	—	June 11, 2005	Kitt Peak	Spacewatch	MRX	1.1 km	MPC · JPL
454828	2015 RH_{185}	—	February 20, 2006	Kitt Peak	Spacewatch	MAS	900 m	MPC · JPL
454829	2015 RF_{193}	—	June 26, 2011	Mount Lemmon	Mount Lemmon Survey	·	1.1 km	MPC · JPL
454830	2015 RS_{201}	—	April 13, 2004	Kitt Peak	Spacewatch	HOF	2.6 km	MPC · JPL
454831	2015 RU_{205}	—	December 18, 2007	Mount Lemmon	Mount Lemmon Survey	·	2.0 km	MPC · JPL
454832	2015 RZ_{207}	—	March 31, 2008	Kitt Peak	Spacewatch	·	2.9 km	MPC · JPL
454833	2015 RA_{209}	—	December 12, 2006	Kitt Peak	Spacewatch	KOR	1.4 km	MPC · JPL
454834	2015 RM_{209}	—	December 27, 2006	Mount Lemmon	Mount Lemmon Survey	KOR	1.3 km	MPC · JPL
454835	2015 RW_{213}	—	March 18, 2010	Mount Lemmon	Mount Lemmon Survey	·	1.2 km	MPC · JPL
454836	2015 RY_{213}	—	September 6, 2004	Siding Spring	SSS	·	3.5 km	MPC · JPL
454837	2015 RB_{217}	—	October 11, 1993	Kitt Peak	Spacewatch	·	2.7 km	MPC · JPL
454838	2015 RS_{222}	—	April 2, 2013	Mount Lemmon	Mount Lemmon Survey	·	2.8 km	MPC · JPL
454839	2015 RB_{226}	—	March 4, 2005	Kitt Peak	Spacewatch	·	1.1 km	MPC · JPL
454840	2015 RS_{226}	—	March 15, 2007	Mount Lemmon	Mount Lemmon Survey	·	2.5 km	MPC · JPL
454841	2015 RC_{227}	—	April 26, 2006	Kitt Peak	Spacewatch	·	1.2 km	MPC · JPL
454842	2015 RY_{227}	—	November 23, 2006	Kitt Peak	Spacewatch	AST	2.5 km	MPC · JPL
454843	2015 RH_{228}	—	September 24, 2000	Socorro	LINEAR	ERI	1.4 km	MPC · JPL
454844	2015 RJ_{233}	—	November 6, 2005	Kitt Peak	Spacewatch	·	1.9 km	MPC · JPL
454845	2015 RW_{234}	—	October 31, 2005	Catalina	CSS	·	730 m	MPC · JPL
454846	2015 RX_{237}	—	September 24, 2009	Kitt Peak	Spacewatch	·	3.4 km	MPC · JPL
454847	2015 RD_{238}	—	January 26, 2006	Mount Lemmon	Mount Lemmon Survey	·	2.6 km	MPC · JPL
454848	2015 RG_{239}	—	September 18, 2003	Kitt Peak	Spacewatch	·	3.2 km	MPC · JPL
454849	2015 RV_{239}	—	May 9, 2005	Kitt Peak	Spacewatch	·	2.2 km	MPC · JPL
454850	2015 RX_{239}	—	March 14, 2013	Kitt Peak	Spacewatch	·	1.6 km	MPC · JPL
454851	2015 RF_{240}	—	October 27, 2005	Catalina	CSS	·	2.9 km	MPC · JPL
454852	2015 RX_{243}	—	November 2, 2000	Socorro	LINEAR	·	1.3 km	MPC · JPL
454853	2015 RG_{244}	—	February 27, 2012	Kitt Peak	Spacewatch	·	3.5 km	MPC · JPL
454854	2015 SU_{5}	—	October 17, 2010	Catalina	CSS	·	2.2 km	MPC · JPL
454855	2015 SN_{6}	—	March 26, 2009	Kitt Peak	Spacewatch	EUN	1.3 km	MPC · JPL
454856	2015 SY_{9}	—	January 14, 2011	Kitt Peak	Spacewatch	H	570 m	MPC · JPL
454857	2015 SS_{10}	—	October 24, 2005	Kitt Peak	Spacewatch	·	1.9 km	MPC · JPL
454858	2015 SS_{12}	—	August 6, 2010	WISE	WISE	·	2.7 km	MPC · JPL
454859	2015 SB_{13}	—	March 19, 2009	Kitt Peak	Spacewatch	BRA	1.4 km	MPC · JPL
454860	2015 SH_{16}	—	November 20, 2008	Mount Lemmon	Mount Lemmon Survey	ERI	1.7 km	MPC · JPL
454861	2015 SE_{18}	—	October 23, 2004	Kitt Peak	Spacewatch	·	1.1 km	MPC · JPL
454862	2015 SP_{18}	—	October 3, 2006	Mount Lemmon	Mount Lemmon Survey	·	1.9 km	MPC · JPL
454863	2015 SN_{19}	—	October 8, 2008	Mount Lemmon	Mount Lemmon Survey	·	1.1 km	MPC · JPL
454864	2015 SU_{19}	—	December 13, 2004	Campo Imperatore	CINEOS	·	4.0 km	MPC · JPL
454865	2015 TE_{3}	—	October 8, 2004	Kitt Peak	Spacewatch	VER	2.7 km	MPC · JPL
454866	2015 TF_{13}	—	July 23, 2010	WISE	WISE	·	2.5 km	MPC · JPL
454867	2015 TK_{22}	—	September 28, 2000	Kitt Peak	Spacewatch	·	1.2 km	MPC · JPL
454868	2015 TB_{23}	—	December 2, 2005	Kitt Peak	Spacewatch	·	770 m	MPC · JPL
454869	2015 TY_{43}	—	March 14, 2010	Mount Lemmon	Mount Lemmon Survey	NYS	1.1 km	MPC · JPL
454870	2015 TB_{57}	—	May 10, 2002	Kitt Peak	Spacewatch	·	1.0 km	MPC · JPL
454871	2015 TD_{62}	—	October 3, 2010	Catalina	CSS	·	2.1 km	MPC · JPL
454872	2015 TZ_{62}	—	October 9, 2004	Kitt Peak	Spacewatch	·	3.5 km	MPC · JPL
454873	2015 TK_{63}	—	October 26, 2005	Kitt Peak	Spacewatch	·	2.0 km	MPC · JPL
454874	2015 TD_{64}	—	August 17, 2009	Catalina	CSS	·	3.3 km	MPC · JPL
454875	2015 TZ_{64}	—	November 5, 2005	Mount Lemmon	Mount Lemmon Survey	EOS	1.8 km	MPC · JPL
454876	2015 TD_{67}	—	March 12, 2007	Kitt Peak	Spacewatch	·	660 m	MPC · JPL
454877	2015 TR_{68}	—	November 18, 2001	Kitt Peak	Spacewatch	·	720 m	MPC · JPL
454878	2015 TU_{68}	—	September 16, 2010	Kitt Peak	Spacewatch	DOR	2.2 km	MPC · JPL
454879	2015 TH_{69}	—	October 13, 2006	Kitt Peak	Spacewatch	·	1.8 km	MPC · JPL
454880	2015 TX_{69}	—	September 22, 2009	Catalina	CSS	·	4.2 km	MPC · JPL
454881	2015 TJ_{72}	—	December 11, 2004	Kitt Peak	Spacewatch	MAS	670 m	MPC · JPL
454882	2015 TN_{72}	—	November 11, 1999	Kitt Peak	Spacewatch	·	2.5 km	MPC · JPL
454883	2015 TL_{75}	—	September 25, 2006	Kitt Peak	Spacewatch	·	1.5 km	MPC · JPL
454884	2015 TD_{76}	—	March 12, 2007	Kitt Peak	Spacewatch	·	1.7 km	MPC · JPL
454885	2015 TE_{76}	—	October 6, 2004	Kitt Peak	Spacewatch	·	820 m	MPC · JPL
454886	2015 TW_{77}	—	December 21, 2005	Catalina	CSS	·	2.2 km	MPC · JPL
454887	2015 TM_{78}	—	October 29, 2010	Kitt Peak	Spacewatch	EOS	1.6 km	MPC · JPL
454888	2015 TD_{79}	—	December 19, 2004	Mount Lemmon	Mount Lemmon Survey	CLA	1.7 km	MPC · JPL
454889	2015 TU_{79}	—	October 14, 1998	Caussols	ODAS	·	1.1 km	MPC · JPL
454890	2015 TL_{80}	—	February 25, 2010	WISE	WISE	CYB	3.5 km	MPC · JPL
454891	2015 TR_{86}	—	April 21, 2009	Kitt Peak	Spacewatch	KON	2.3 km	MPC · JPL
454892	2015 TH_{88}	—	April 21, 2009	Mount Lemmon	Mount Lemmon Survey	EUN	880 m	MPC · JPL
454893	2015 TN_{89}	—	October 10, 2004	Kitt Peak	Spacewatch	·	860 m	MPC · JPL
454894	2015 TB_{90}	—	October 13, 2006	Kitt Peak	Spacewatch	WIT	1.2 km	MPC · JPL
454895	2015 TJ_{90}	—	October 2, 1999	Kitt Peak	Spacewatch	EOS	2.1 km	MPC · JPL
454896	2015 TQ_{93}	—	December 31, 1999	Kitt Peak	Spacewatch	EOS	2.1 km	MPC · JPL
454897	2015 TR_{95}	—	September 26, 2006	Mount Lemmon	Mount Lemmon Survey	·	1.3 km	MPC · JPL
454898	2015 TP_{97}	—	November 9, 1999	Kitt Peak	Spacewatch	·	2.5 km	MPC · JPL
454899	2015 TR_{99}	—	October 7, 2004	Kitt Peak	Spacewatch	EOS	2.1 km	MPC · JPL
454900	2015 TK_{102}	—	October 16, 2006	Catalina	CSS	·	2.0 km	MPC · JPL

== 454901–455000 ==
back to top

Designation			Discovery			Properties		Ref
Permanent	Provisional	Named after	Date	Site	Discoverer(s)	Category	Diam.	Ref
454901	2015 TF_{103}	—	January 30, 2011	Mount Lemmon	Mount Lemmon Survey	CYB	3.9 km	MPC · JPL
454902	2015 TG_{103}	—	October 22, 2006	Catalina	CSS	·	1.6 km	MPC · JPL
454903	2015 TA_{110}	—	November 17, 2004	Siding Spring	SSS	H	650 m	MPC · JPL
454904	2015 TW_{113}	—	December 14, 2004	Campo Imperatore	CINEOS	·	3.3 km	MPC · JPL
454905	2015 TF_{114}	—	November 20, 2004	Kitt Peak	Spacewatch	·	3.7 km	MPC · JPL
454906	2015 TE_{122}	—	February 29, 2008	Mount Lemmon	Mount Lemmon Survey	·	1.7 km	MPC · JPL
454907	2015 TX_{129}	—	August 28, 2005	Kitt Peak	Spacewatch	·	2.2 km	MPC · JPL
454908	2015 TA_{130}	—	July 29, 1998	Caussols	ODAS	(5)	3.3 km	MPC · JPL
454909	2015 TK_{131}	—	November 30, 2011	Kitt Peak	Spacewatch	·	1.9 km	MPC · JPL
454910	2015 TB_{132}	—	November 6, 2005	Mount Lemmon	Mount Lemmon Survey	·	1.9 km	MPC · JPL
454911	2015 TE_{132}	—	March 31, 2008	Kitt Peak	Spacewatch	·	1.8 km	MPC · JPL
454912	2015 TM_{133}	—	February 27, 2006	Mount Lemmon	Mount Lemmon Survey	·	3.0 km	MPC · JPL
454913	2015 TT_{135}	—	January 9, 2006	Kitt Peak	Spacewatch	·	2.2 km	MPC · JPL
454914	2015 TC_{136}	—	March 12, 1996	Kitt Peak	Spacewatch	·	2.3 km	MPC · JPL
454915	2015 TJ_{136}	—	May 14, 2004	Kitt Peak	Spacewatch	615	1.9 km	MPC · JPL
454916	2015 TN_{136}	—	July 21, 2006	Mount Lemmon	Mount Lemmon Survey	EUN	1.0 km	MPC · JPL
454917	2015 TX_{137}	—	December 25, 2010	Mount Lemmon	Mount Lemmon Survey	·	4.0 km	MPC · JPL
454918	2015 TW_{139}	—	December 2, 2010	Kitt Peak	Spacewatch	·	2.9 km	MPC · JPL
454919	2015 TR_{146}	—	October 13, 2004	Kitt Peak	Spacewatch	·	3.5 km	MPC · JPL
454920	2015 TR_{147}	—	May 7, 2006	Kitt Peak	Spacewatch	·	1.2 km	MPC · JPL
454921	2015 TV_{147}	—	October 17, 2006	Mount Lemmon	Mount Lemmon Survey	·	2.5 km	MPC · JPL
454922	2015 TH_{150}	—	August 28, 2006	Kitt Peak	Spacewatch	·	1.3 km	MPC · JPL
454923	2015 TR_{151}	—	March 10, 2007	Mount Lemmon	Mount Lemmon Survey	·	3.5 km	MPC · JPL
454924	2015 TE_{153}	—	September 14, 2005	Kitt Peak	Spacewatch	·	910 m	MPC · JPL
454925	2015 TP_{154}	—	September 4, 2008	Kitt Peak	Spacewatch	V	570 m	MPC · JPL
454926	2015 TL_{155}	—	September 28, 2011	Mount Lemmon	Mount Lemmon Survey	·	1.2 km	MPC · JPL
454927	2015 TU_{157}	—	August 29, 2005	Kitt Peak	Spacewatch	·	1.6 km	MPC · JPL
454928	2015 TV_{157}	—	February 21, 2007	Mount Lemmon	Mount Lemmon Survey	·	2.5 km	MPC · JPL
454929	2015 TG_{158}	—	October 21, 2008	Mount Lemmon	Mount Lemmon Survey	·	1.5 km	MPC · JPL
454930	2015 TS_{158}	—	April 18, 2009	Kitt Peak	Spacewatch	·	1.5 km	MPC · JPL
454931	2015 TC_{159}	—	February 19, 2010	WISE	WISE	PHO	2.3 km	MPC · JPL
454932	2015 TG_{159}	—	April 2, 2005	Mount Lemmon	Mount Lemmon Survey	·	830 m	MPC · JPL
454933	2015 TB_{162}	—	June 15, 2010	Mount Lemmon	Mount Lemmon Survey	·	1.6 km	MPC · JPL
454934	2015 TC_{169}	—	April 15, 2007	Catalina	CSS	·	1.1 km	MPC · JPL
454935	2015 TG_{171}	—	December 15, 2001	Socorro	LINEAR	·	2.2 km	MPC · JPL
454936	2015 TL_{175}	—	April 9, 2010	Mount Lemmon	Mount Lemmon Survey	·	1.1 km	MPC · JPL
454937	2015 TL_{176}	—	November 17, 2011	Kitt Peak	Spacewatch	·	1.8 km	MPC · JPL
454938	2015 TN_{177}	—	August 21, 2008	Kitt Peak	Spacewatch	·	640 m	MPC · JPL
454939	2015 TZ_{177}	—	November 20, 2007	Mount Lemmon	Mount Lemmon Survey	MAR	990 m	MPC · JPL
454940	2015 TD_{180}	—	December 11, 2004	Kitt Peak	Spacewatch	·	2.1 km	MPC · JPL
454941	2015 TJ_{180}	—	October 23, 1997	Kitt Peak	Spacewatch	·	810 m	MPC · JPL
454942	2015 TL_{184}	—	December 31, 1999	Kitt Peak	Spacewatch	·	3.1 km	MPC · JPL
454943	2015 TY_{187}	—	October 8, 2010	Kitt Peak	Spacewatch	·	4.6 km	MPC · JPL
454944	2015 TS_{188}	—	October 31, 2010	Kitt Peak	Spacewatch	·	1.9 km	MPC · JPL
454945	2015 TH_{191}	—	November 1, 2008	Mount Lemmon	Mount Lemmon Survey	·	1.1 km	MPC · JPL
454946	2015 TY_{191}	—	September 23, 2008	Mount Lemmon	Mount Lemmon Survey	MAS	620 m	MPC · JPL
454947	2015 TE_{192}	—	September 17, 1998	Caussols	ODAS	·	1.4 km	MPC · JPL
454948	2015 TJ_{192}	—	August 29, 2011	Siding Spring	SSS	·	1.4 km	MPC · JPL
454949	2015 TK_{192}	—	March 29, 2008	Kitt Peak	Spacewatch	·	3.4 km	MPC · JPL
454950	2015 TZ_{192}	—	September 14, 2007	Mount Lemmon	Mount Lemmon Survey	KON	1.8 km	MPC · JPL
454951	2015 TJ_{193}	—	April 29, 2008	Kitt Peak	Spacewatch	·	3.0 km	MPC · JPL
454952	2015 TM_{193}	—	November 17, 2011	Mount Lemmon	Mount Lemmon Survey	·	1.5 km	MPC · JPL
454953	2015 TO_{193}	—	December 25, 2005	Kitt Peak	Spacewatch	·	1.9 km	MPC · JPL
454954	2015 TK_{196}	—	December 5, 2005	Kitt Peak	Spacewatch	·	1.0 km	MPC · JPL
454955	2015 TA_{197}	—	September 28, 2006	Mount Lemmon	Mount Lemmon Survey	·	1.8 km	MPC · JPL
454956	2015 TN_{197}	—	October 30, 2010	Mount Lemmon	Mount Lemmon Survey	·	2.2 km	MPC · JPL
454957	2015 TY_{197}	—	April 6, 2008	Mount Lemmon	Mount Lemmon Survey	·	2.0 km	MPC · JPL
454958	2015 TJ_{198}	—	October 7, 1996	Kitt Peak	Spacewatch	·	620 m	MPC · JPL
454959	2015 TK_{198}	—	October 8, 2004	Kitt Peak	Spacewatch	·	4.1 km	MPC · JPL
454960	2015 TB_{199}	—	November 20, 2008	Kitt Peak	Spacewatch	MAS	760 m	MPC · JPL
454961	2015 TH_{199}	—	July 10, 2007	Siding Spring	SSS	·	2.4 km	MPC · JPL
454962	2015 TM_{200}	—	October 10, 2004	Socorro	LINEAR	·	3.3 km	MPC · JPL
454963	2015 TP_{202}	—	September 17, 2004	Socorro	LINEAR	NYS	1.3 km	MPC · JPL
454964	2015 TZ_{202}	—	October 29, 2005	Catalina	CSS	·	650 m	MPC · JPL
454965	2015 TF_{203}	—	October 11, 1997	Kitt Peak	Spacewatch	NYS	750 m	MPC · JPL
454966	2015 TQ_{204}	—	October 2, 2000	Anderson Mesa	LONEOS	·	2.5 km	MPC · JPL
454967	2015 TS_{204}	—	October 9, 2004	Socorro	LINEAR	·	3.4 km	MPC · JPL
454968	2015 TU_{204}	—	November 3, 2004	Kitt Peak	Spacewatch	·	1.3 km	MPC · JPL
454969	2015 TV_{204}	—	June 1, 1997	Kitt Peak	Spacewatch	·	3.0 km	MPC · JPL
454970	2015 TD_{205}	—	March 16, 2007	Mount Lemmon	Mount Lemmon Survey	·	5.9 km	MPC · JPL
454971	2015 TE_{206}	—	October 8, 2004	Kitt Peak	Spacewatch	·	2.4 km	MPC · JPL
454972	2015 TL_{207}	—	September 3, 2008	Kitt Peak	Spacewatch	·	650 m	MPC · JPL
454973	2015 TU_{208}	—	September 14, 2009	Catalina	CSS	·	3.2 km	MPC · JPL
454974	2015 TV_{208}	—	July 3, 2005	Kitt Peak	Spacewatch	GEF	1.2 km	MPC · JPL
454975	2015 TF_{209}	—	December 30, 2005	Mount Lemmon	Mount Lemmon Survey	·	1.0 km	MPC · JPL
454976	2015 TG_{209}	—	September 15, 2004	Kitt Peak	Spacewatch	·	980 m	MPC · JPL
454977	2015 TX_{209}	—	December 30, 2008	Mount Lemmon	Mount Lemmon Survey	V	620 m	MPC · JPL
454978	2015 TU_{210}	—	September 18, 2003	Kitt Peak	Spacewatch	·	850 m	MPC · JPL
454979	2015 TC_{211}	—	March 16, 2007	Kitt Peak	Spacewatch	·	2.9 km	MPC · JPL
454980	2015 TA_{214}	—	September 26, 2006	Kitt Peak	Spacewatch	NEM	2.6 km	MPC · JPL
454981	2015 TS_{219}	—	March 7, 2008	Kitt Peak	Spacewatch	·	2.0 km	MPC · JPL
454982	2015 TU_{219}	—	December 22, 2008	Mount Lemmon	Mount Lemmon Survey	·	1.1 km	MPC · JPL
454983	2015 TG_{221}	—	November 4, 1999	Kitt Peak	Spacewatch	·	2.1 km	MPC · JPL
454984	2015 TT_{223}	—	October 16, 1977	Palomar	C. J. van Houten, I. van Houten-Groeneveld, T. Gehrels	·	1.8 km	MPC · JPL
454985	2015 TC_{224}	—	December 20, 2004	Mount Lemmon	Mount Lemmon Survey	MAS	850 m	MPC · JPL
454986	2015 TJ_{224}	—	September 16, 2003	Kitt Peak	Spacewatch	·	4.3 km	MPC · JPL
454987	2015 TS_{229}	—	December 5, 2002	Socorro	LINEAR	H	560 m	MPC · JPL
454988	2015 TG_{231}	—	October 29, 2006	Catalina	CSS	·	2.1 km	MPC · JPL
454989	2015 TV_{231}	—	October 13, 2004	Anderson Mesa	LONEOS	·	3.2 km	MPC · JPL
454990	2015 TZ_{232}	—	March 19, 2009	Kitt Peak	Spacewatch	H	390 m	MPC · JPL
454991	2015 TG_{233}	—	March 2, 2006	Kitt Peak	Spacewatch	·	2.3 km	MPC · JPL
454992	2015 TY_{233}	—	October 10, 2005	Catalina	CSS	·	780 m	MPC · JPL
454993	2015 TG_{241}	—	November 21, 2009	Mount Lemmon	Mount Lemmon Survey	·	770 m	MPC · JPL
454994	2015 TE_{242}	—	August 11, 2007	Anderson Mesa	LONEOS	·	1.4 km	MPC · JPL
454995	2015 TV_{242}	—	December 15, 2004	Kitt Peak	Spacewatch	·	890 m	MPC · JPL
454996	2015 TM_{243}	—	October 20, 1998	Caussols	ODAS	·	480 m	MPC · JPL
454997	2015 TP_{243}	—	October 5, 2004	Kitt Peak	Spacewatch	·	2.8 km	MPC · JPL
454998	2015 TQ_{243}	—	March 14, 2007	Kitt Peak	Spacewatch	EOS	2.1 km	MPC · JPL
454999	2015 TH_{246}	—	August 25, 2001	Kitt Peak	Spacewatch	·	1.8 km	MPC · JPL
455000	2015 TD_{248}	—	March 30, 2008	Kitt Peak	Spacewatch	EOS	1.9 km	MPC · JPL

back to top

== Meaning of names ==
As minor planet discoveries are confirmed, they are given a permanent number by the IAU's Minor Planet Center (MPC), and the discoverers can then submit names for them, following the IAU's naming conventions. The list below concerns those minor planets in the specified number-range that have received names, and explains the meanings of those names.

Official naming citations of newly named small Solar System bodies are approved and published in a bulletin by IAU's Working Group for Small Bodies Nomenclature (WGSBN). Before May 2021, citations were published in MPC's Minor Planet Circulars for many decades. Recent citations can also be found on the JPL Small-Body Database (SBDB). Until his death in 2016, German astronomer Lutz D. Schmadel compiled these citations into the Dictionary of Minor Planet Names (DMP) and regularly updated the collection.

Based on Paul Herget's The Names of the Minor Planets, Schmadel also researched the unclear origin of numerous asteroids, most of which had been named prior to World War II. This article incorporates text from this source, which is in the public domain: SBDB New namings may only be added to this list below after official publication as the preannouncement of names is condemned. The WGSBN publishes a comprehensive guideline for the naming rules of non-cometary small Solar System bodies.

Named minor planet	Provisional	This minor planet was named for...	Ref · Catalog
454326 Donlee	2014 KB_{52}	Don Lee (born 1949) is a material scientist at Teledyne Imaging Sensors who has played a critical role in the development of high performance HgCdTe infrared detectors that have enabled a generation of scientific facilities, including the Hubble Space Telescope, WISE, the Mars Reconnaissance Orbiter and New Horizons.	JPL · 454326
454329 Ericpiquette	2014 KL_{59}	Eric Piquette (born 1971) is a material scientist at Teledyne Imaging Sensors who has played a critical role in the development of high performance HgCdTe infrared detectors that have enabled a generation of scientific facilities, including the Hubble Space Telescope, WISE, the Mars Reconnaissance Orbiter and New Horizons.	JPL · 454329
454350 Paolaamico	2014 LH_{24}	Paola Amico (born 1964) is a systems engineer at the European Southern Observatory. She has been a key member of teams that have developed and installed detector systems and instrumentation at the world's largest ground-based telescopes, including ESO's Very Large Telescope and the W. M. Keck Observatory.	JPL · 454350
454352 Majidzandian	2014 LO_{26}	Majid Zandian (born 1962) is a material scientist at Teledyne Imaging Sensors who has played a critical role in the development of high performance HgCdTe infrared detectors that have enabled a generation of scientific facilities, including the Hubble Space Telescope, WISE, the Mars Reconnaissance Orbiter and New Horizons.	JPL · 454352
454409 Markusloose	2014 NP_{44}	Markus Loose (born 1970), an electrical engineer, has played a central role in the development of low noise infrared detector electronics that have enabled a new generation of astronomical instrumentation. His electronics have been used in numerous ground- and space-based telescopes, including the Hubble Space Telescope and WISE	JPL · 454409
454419 Hansklausreif	2014 NJ_{58}	Hans-Klaus Reif (born 1949) has built very large high-precision shutters that are used with CCD cameras at ground-based observatories around the world. His shutters enable large cameras in telescopes at La Palma, Kitt Peak, Haleakala, Paranal and Palomar Observatory.	JPL · 454419
454505 Suntharalingam	2014 OS_{180}	Vyshnavi Suntharalingam (born 1968) has led the development of advanced visible CCD and CMOS detectors at MIT Lincoln Laboratory. She has helped create larger format devices that can be assembled into mosaics.	JPL · 454505
