= Don Lee (politician) =

American politician (born 1960)

Don Lee (born February 28, 1960 in Blue Island, Illinois) was the state representative of District 28, consisting of the Columbine/Ken Caryl area of Jefferson County, Colorado, United States from 1998 to 2005. Columbine High School is located within the district he represented. He is best known for assisting victim parents from the Columbine High School massacre in approving the "Respect Life" license plate, raising funds for victims of the Columbine High School massacre as well as attempting to form an investigative committee to explore any "unanswered questions" about the attacks on Columbine and its aftermath. Lee was reelected to his fourth term to the Colorado State House of Representatives in 2004 whereupon he promptly resigned therefore paving the way for a Republican vacancy committee to name Jim Kerr as his replacement. He currently is vice president of government affairs for K12, Inc.

== Family ==
Lee is married to his wife Rachel and together they have three children.

== Religion ==
Don Lee is a Christian.

== Organizations ==
- Lee is past President of Council of Homeowners Organizations for Planned Environment
