= Trevor St. John =

American actor (born 1971)

- Born: Trevor Marshall St. John; September 3, 1971 (age 55); Spokane, Washington, U.S.
- Education: Whitworth University
- Occupation: Actor
- Years active: 1995–present
- Children: 1
- Website: www.trevorstjohn.com

Trevor Marshall St. John (born September 3, 1971) is an American actor. He portrayed Todd Manning/Victor Lord Jr. on the ABC daytime drama One Life to Live, and has starred in various primetime shows and films. He is known for his performances in Patrick Wang's critically acclaimed independent drama films, In the Family and The Grief of Others. St. John joined the cast of Roswell, New Mexico in 2019.

== Career ==
St. John was born in Spokane, Washington, and raised in nearby Orchard Prairie, Washington. He attended Whitworth University on a jazz performance scholarship, where he played the drums. As a jazz percussionist, he has played with Gene Harris, Marshal Royal, Slide Hampton, and Bill Berry. In May 2003, he joined the cast of One Life to Live. In August 2022, it was announced that he was joining the cast of The Young and the Restless.

== Filmography ==
=== Film ===
Year	Title	Role	Notes
1995	Higher Learning	James	
1995	Crimson Tide	Launcher	
1996	Bio-Dome	Parker	
1997	Back in Business	Preston	
1997	Dogtown	Phillip Van Horn	
1999	Payback	Johnny Bronson	
2000	The King's Guard	Capt. John Reynolds	
2007	The Bourne Ultimatum	Tactical Team Leader	
2007	The Kingdom	Earl Ripon	
2010	My Soul to Take	Lake	
2011	In the Family	Cody Hines	
2013	Dark Skies	Alex Holcombe	
2013	Tarzan	Clayton	
2015	The Grief of Others	John Ryrie	
2017	The Student	Stan Grandacre	
2018	Edge of the World	Coach Davis	
2018	A Bread Factory	Karl	
2018	A Bread Factory Part Two	Karl	
2024	A Good Enough Day	Tyler Hamilton	Lead role; also director and co-writer
2026	I Play Rocky	Grant Bader	

=== Television ===
Year	Title	Role	Notes
1995	Sketch Artist II: Hands That See	College Guy	Television film
1995	Serving in Silence: The Margarethe Cammermeyer Story	David	Television film
1995	Murder, She Wrote	Colin Forbes	Episode: "School for Murder"
1995	Seaquest 2032	Martin	Episode: "Spindrift"
1999	Diagnosis: Murder	Tommy Santini	Episode: "The Killer Within"
1999-2000	Nash Bridges	Jason Dalton	2 episodes
2000	The Beach Boys: An American Family	Jan Berry	Episode #1.1
2002	Just Shoot Me!	Cameron	Episode: "A Beautiful Mind"
2003	One Life to Live	Walker Laurence	
2003–2013	One Life to Live	Todd Manning / Victor Lord, Jr.	Regular role
2006	Hope & Faith	Kiley	Episode: "Now and Zen"
2007	Dirty Sexy Money	Devlin George	Episode: "Pilot"
2012–2013	The Client List	Nathan	3 episodes
2013	A Mother's Rage	Roan	Television film
2013	Finding Normal	Lucas Craig	Television film
2013	The Vampire Diaries	Dr Whitmore	Episode: "The Cell"
2014	The Mentalist	John Hennigan	Episode: "Violets"
2014–2015	Youthful Daze	Matt	17 episodes
2015	CSI: Cyber	Derrick Wilson	Episode: "Killer En Route"
2016	Containment	Leo	13 episodes
2017	The Fosters	Mariana's Therapist	2 episodes
2017	Wicked Mom's Club	Ellis	Television film
2018	The Neighborhood Nightmare	James Porter	Television film
2018	Her Worst Nightmare	Professor Campbell	Television film
2018	Watching Over You	Mike	Television film
2019–2020	Roswell, New Mexico	Jesse Manes	26 episodes
2022–2024	The Young and the Restless	Tucker McCall	Series regular

== Nominations ==
Year	Award	Award ceremony	Work	Notes	Result
2005	Irresistible Combination	Daytime Emmy Awards	One Life to Live	Shared with Kassie DePaiva	Nominated

== See also ==
- Todd Manning and Blair Cramer
- Todd Manning and Téa Delgado

Preceded by Stephen Nichols	Tucker McCall (role); 2022–24	None
