= Wendy Moniz =

American actress (born 1969)

- Born: January 19, 1969 (age 57); Kansas City, Missouri, U.S.
- Other name: Wendy Moniz-Grillo
- Education: B.M.C.Durfee High School, Fall River, Massachusetts Siena College, Loudonville, NY
- Occupation: Actress
- Years active: 1995–present
- Spouses: David Birsner (m. 1991; div. 1996) Frank Grillo (m. 2000; div. 2020)
- Children: 2

Wendy Moniz (born January 19, 1969) is an American television actress. She began her career playing the role of Dinah Marler in the CBS soap opera Guiding Light from 1995 to 1999 and after leaving the soap starred in the biographical drama film, Tuesdays with Morrie. In 2000, she was a regular cast member in the short-lived sitcom Battery Park.

Moniz starred as Rachel McCabe during the final season of the CBS police procedural Nash Bridges (2000–2001), and as Louisa Archer in the CBS legal drama The Guardian (2001–2004). From 2013 to 2014, Moniz starred as Elaine McAllister in ABC drama series Betrayal and from 2018 to 2024 as Governor Lynelle Perry in the Paramount Network neo-Western series, Yellowstone. Moniz also had a recurring roles as Jill Burnham in the FX legal thriller Damages (2009–2010), as Laura Moretti in the Netflix political drama House of Cards (2015–2016), and as ADA Anne Frasier in the NBC police drama Law & Order: Organized Crime (2021–2025).

== Career ==
Moniz made her television debut in the CBS daytime soap opera Guiding Light as Dinah Marler. She starred as a series regular from 1995 to 1999 and was nominated for two Soap Opera Digest Awards.

In 1999, Moniz landed a role in the primetime CBS drama pilot Partners. In the same year, she starred as the female lead in the critically acclaimed television film adaptation of Mitch Albom's book Tuesdays with Morrie. She later was a series regular in the short-lived NBC comedy series Battery Park opposite Elizabeth Perkins. In fall of 2000, Moniz was cast as a series regular in the role of Rachel McCabe in the sixth and final season of the CBS series Nash Bridges. She later starred as Louisa "Lulu" Archer on the CBS series The Guardian opposite Simon Baker. The series aired from 2001 to 2004.

Moniz guest-starred in an episode of the NBC legal drama Law & Order in 2005, and had a recurring role as Stacey Walker in the ABC short-lived comedy-drama Big Shots in 2007. She later appeared as Jill Burnham on the FX series Damages from 2009 to 2010. In 2010 she was cast as Tom Selleck's love interest in the CBS police drama Blue Bloods, but the role was recast with Andrea Roth. She later appeared in the recurring role of Llanview Mayor Finn - who succeeds the exiting Mayor Dorian Lord on the ABC daytime soap opera One Life to Live in 2011. She also appeared in the ABC series 666 Park Avenue in 2012.

In March 2013, Moniz was cast opposite Stuart Townsend, James Cromwell and Hannah Ware in the ABC drama series Betrayal directed by Patty Jenkins and based on the Dutch drama series Overspel. The series was canceled after one season. In 2014, Moniz was cast as lead in the independent drama film The Grief of Others directed by Patrick Wang. The film and her performance received positive reviews from critics. Matt Zoller Seitz wrote in his review: " “The Grief of Others” is unerring when it’s sticking to the main couple, and they’re incarnated with great skill by Wang’s lead actors. Moniz is wizardly at playing moments where her character seems to have no idea that she’s even made a mistake, much less how devastating it was."

In 2015, Moniz appeared in Netflix superhero series Daredevil and political drama House of Cards. In 2016, she was cast in a recurring role as a love interest for her real-life husband at the time, Frank Grillo, in the DirecTV drama Kingdom. From 2016 to 2017 she had a recurring role on CBS series, Pure Genius. In 2017 she appeared opposite Grillo in the Netflix film, Wheelman. In 2018, Moniz was cast as Montana Governor Lynelle Perry in the Paramount Network drama series, Yellowstone. She was promoted to series regular for fifth season. In 2021 she also began appear as ADA Anne Frasier in the NBC police drama Law & Order: Organized Crime, and in 2022 as Judge April Brooks in CBS's FBI: Most Wanted.

== Personal life ==
Moniz, of Portuguese and Irish descent, was born in Kansas City, Missouri. She attended Siena College in Loudonville, New York in 1991. She married David Birsner in 1991, but the couple divorced without issue in 1996. She married her former Guiding Light co-star, Frank Grillo in October 2000, and separated from him in February 2020 and finalized their divorce in September 2020. The couple has two sons.

== Filmography ==
Year	Title	Role	Notes
1995–1999	Guiding Light	Dinah Marler	Series regular Nominated – Soap Opera Digest Award for Outstanding Female Newcomer (1996); Nominated – Soap Opera Digest Award for Outstanding Younger Lead Actress (1997)
1999	Partners	Maggie Spivak	TV Pilot
1999	Tuesdays with Morrie	Janine	Television movie
2000	Battery Park	Maria DiCenzo	Series regular, 7 episodes
2000	The Others	Eva	Episode: "Life Is for the Living"
2000–2001	Nash Bridges	Insp. Rachel McCabe	Series regular, 22 episodes
2001–2004	The Guardian	Louisa "Lulu" Archer	Series regular, 58 episodes
2005	Law & Order	Arlene Tarrington	Episode: "House of Cards"
2007	Big Shots	Stacey Walker	Recurring role, 4 episodes
2009–2010	Damages	Jill Burnham	Recurring role, 7 episodes
2011	One Life to Live	Mayor Kathleen Finn	Recurring role, 4 episodes
2012	666 Park Avenue	Ingrid Weismann	Episode: "Hero Complex"
2013–2014	Betrayal	Elaine McAllister	Series regular, 13 episodes
2015	The Grief of Others	Ricky Ryrie	
2015	Daredevil	Jennifer Fisher	Episode: "Rabbit in a Snowstorm"
2016–2017	House of Cards	Laura Moretti	Recurring role, 7 episodes
2016	Kingdom	Roxanne Dunn	Recurring role, 7 episodes
2016–2017	Pure Genius	Julianna Wallace	Recurring role, 4 episodes
2017	Wheelman	Jessica	
2018–2024	Yellowstone	Governor Lynelle Perry	Recurring role (seasons 1-4), Series regular (season 5), 29 episodes
2021—2025	Law & Order: Organized Crime	ADA Anne Frasier	Recurring role, 8 episodes
2022—2025	FBI: Most Wanted	Judge April Brooks	5 episodes
2024	Long Gone Heroes	Mace Spencer	
