= Park Overall =

American actress and activist

- Born: Horse Creek, Tennessee, U.S.
- Education: Tusculum College
- Occupations: Actress, activist
- Years active: 1987–present
- Known for: Empty Nest; Biloxi Blues
- Political party: Democratic

Park Overall is an American actress, political activist, and former U.S. Senate candidate, known for her trademark heavy Southern accent. Her best-known role was as nurse Laverne Todd in the sitcom Empty Nest, though she has appeared in the TV show Reba and a number of feature films, including Biloxi Blues, Mississippi Burning, Talk Radio, and In the Family.

== Early life and acting career ==
Overall was born in Horse Creek, Tennessee. She has described her parents as Yellow Dog Democrats. As a teenager, she worked on the political campaigns of Tom Wiseman and Jim Sasser.

Overall graduated from Tusculum University with a degree in English, and briefly attended graduate school at the University of Tennessee. In her late 20s, she moved to New York to pursue an acting career. One of her first roles was in Skin, an off-off-Broadway play about Andy Warhol and Edie Sedgwick. She also appeared in both the stage and film versions of Neil Simon's Biloxi Blues, and had a role in a failed pilot called The Line (which aired once in the summer of 1987) with Dinah Manoff, with whom she eventually costarred on the NBC series Empty Nest.

Empty Nest, which aired from 1988 to 1995, provided Overall's breakthrough role. She played Laverne Higby Todd Kane, nurse to Harry Weston, played by Richard Mulligan. She played the same role in the early episodes of the Empty Nest spinoff, Nurses, in the early 1990s. She later starred in the short-lived TV series Katie Joplin and Ladies Man, both from 1999.

In 1995, she was the voice of Alice Tompkins in the animated series The Critic. She has appeared in several TV movies, including the Lifetime drama Fifteen and Pregnant (1998). She has made guest appearances on TV shows such as The Golden Girls, The Young Riders, and Reba, in which she had a recurring role during the series' first season.

Her first feature role was in Tainted (1987); she appeared in four additional films the same year: Biloxi Blues, Vibes, Mississippi Burning, and Talk Radio. Her role on Talk Radio was voice only. Her most recent appearances were in To Kill a Mockumentary (2006), the Toby Keith film Beer for My Horses (2008), and the Patrick Wang film In the Family (2011).

== Activism ==
Overall has actively supported a number of environmental causes, primarily those affecting her native East Tennessee. In 1995, she gave an interview on ABC's news show Primetime attacking the paper company Champion International, which had for years been accused by environmentalists of polluting the Pigeon River. Abnormally high levels of dioxins in the river had been traced to the company's plant in Canton, North Carolina, and were believed by environmentalists to be the cause of the relatively high rate of cancer deaths in the area around Hartford, Tennessee.

In recent years, Overall has been a vocal critic of Nuclear Fuel Services, which operates a uranium processing complex in Erwin, Tennessee. She has charged that the complex has poor safety standards, pointing to a study released in 2010 that found soil samples along the Nolichucky River contaminated with enriched uranium traced to the complex. Overall has filed numerous petitions with the Nuclear Regulatory Commission, which insists the complex's radiation output levels are safe.

In 2002, Overall helped thwart an attempt by Louisiana Energy Services to build a uranium enrichment facility in the Erwin vicinity. The complex, known as the National Enrichment Facility, has since been constructed in New Mexico. In subsequent years, she sought to prevent NFS's implementation of the Blended Low-Enriched Uranium (BLEU) project in Erwin, which will provide fuel for reactors at Tennessee Valley Authority nuclear power plants.

In 2014, Overall campaigned against a proposed 12-mile (19 km) pipeline that would allow the new U.S. Nitrogen plant in Mosheim to use water from the Nolichucky River. Environmental activists argue that removing water from and discharging the water back into the river will harm the ecosystem downstream from the pipeline, though U.S. Nitrogen insists the pipeline is safe. Overall accused the plant and regulatory agencies that approved the pipeline of lying about how much of the river's water the plant would use.

== 2012 U.S. Senate primary campaign ==
On April 4, 2012, Overall entered the Democratic primary to become the nominee to oppose Republican incumbent Bob Corker. She stated that she planned to focus on the environment, as well as women's issues, opposing the Senate transportation bill's Blunt Amendment, which would have provided a religious exemption for the Obama Administration's contraception mandate, asking, "Why is my womb attached to a transportation bill?" She criticized various measures introduced in the Tennessee General Assembly, including Stacey Campfield's "Don't Say Gay" bill and Richard Floyd's bill that would have forced transgender people to use restrooms for the gender listed on their birth certificates, stating that such legislation was meant to "denigrate" and "inspire fear." She also accused Republicans of "poisoning" the Nolichucky River through lax environmental regulations.

In the August 2, 2012, Democratic primary, Overall garnered less than 15% of the vote, placing a distant third behind conservative Mark Clayton.

== Political positions ==
Overall believes that the government's role is to be "stewards of this planet, and of our people, and of this great nation." She argues that tax dollars should be used for infrastructure, roads, libraries, schools, and "services that made this country great."

Stating that she grew up in a household with an AFL-CIO ashtray on the dinner table, Overall has spoken in favor of labor unions, and warns that Republicans have "stolen" the language of unions, successfully redefining terms like "good benefits" and "pensions" as "a string of cusswords."

Overall is pro-gay marriage, arguing that same-sex couples are guaranteed the right to marry by the 14th Amendment. In response to President Obama's May 2012 endorsement of the legalization of gay marriage, Overall released a statement saying, "Hallelujah and what took so long?"

Overall has frequently criticized state lawmakers for passing restrictions on abortion. In her Jackson Day keynote address in Nashville on April 5, 2012, she mocked the Tennessee state legislature for passing a bill requiring abortion providers to have hospital admitting privileges, stating, "if you have an abortion, you have to have a doctor who has in-house privileges, but keep in mind, the guy who does my botox and lips doesn't." She also accused Virginia Governor Bob McDonnell of not knowing the meaning of "transvaginal", referring to McDonnell's initial support (which he later withdrew) of a measure that would have required a transvaginal ultrasound for women seeking an abortion.

In January 2016, Overall endorsed Senator Bernie Sanders for president, but stated she would support whoever was the Democratic nominee.

In 2018, she ran for the Tennessee State House and lost overwhelmingly by 62 percentage points to incumbent Republican David B. Hawk.

== Filmography ==
Film and television
Year	Title	Role	Notes
1987	The Line	Lucky Kreshaw	TV movie
1987	Tainted	Marion	
1988	Biloxi Blues	Rowena	
1988	Vibes	Jane	
1988–1995	Empty Nest	Laverne Todd	170 episodes Viewers for Quality Television Award for Best Supporting Actress in a Quality Comedy Series (1989–1991); Nominated-Golden Globe Award for Best Supporting Actress - Series, Miniseries or Television Film (1991–1993)
1988	Mississippi Burning	Connie	
1988	Talk Radio	Debbie/Agnes/Teresa	
1989	Lost Angels	Richard Doolan's girlfriend	
1989	The Golden Girls	Laverne Todd	Episode: "Sick and Tired: Part 2"
1990	Kindergarten Cop	Samantha's mother	
1991	The Luck of the Draw	Melody O'Rourke	TV movie
1991–1992	Nurses	Laverne Todd	3 episodes
1992	Overkill: The Aileen Wuornos Story	Tyria Moore	
1993	The Vanishing	Lynn	
1993	House of Cards	Lillian Huber	
1993	Undercover Blues	Bonnie Newman	
1993	Precious Victims	Paula Sims	TV movie
1995	The Critic	Alice Tompkins	10 episodes
1997	Sparkler	Melba May	
1998	Fifteen and Pregnant	Evie Spangler	TV movie
1999	The Price of a Broken Heart	Dot Hutlemeyer	TV movie
1999	Katie Joplin	Katie Joplin	7 episodes
2000	Taming Andrew	Gail	
1999–2000	Ladies Man	Claire Stiles	9 episodes
2001	Slammed	Chastity	
2001–2002	Reba	Lori Ann	7 episodes
2004	Cut and Run	Pauline	short film
2006	To Kill a Mockumentary	Professor Shellington	
2008	Beer for My Horses	Barbara	
2011	In the Family	Sally Hines	
