= Jessica Pimentel =

American actress and singer

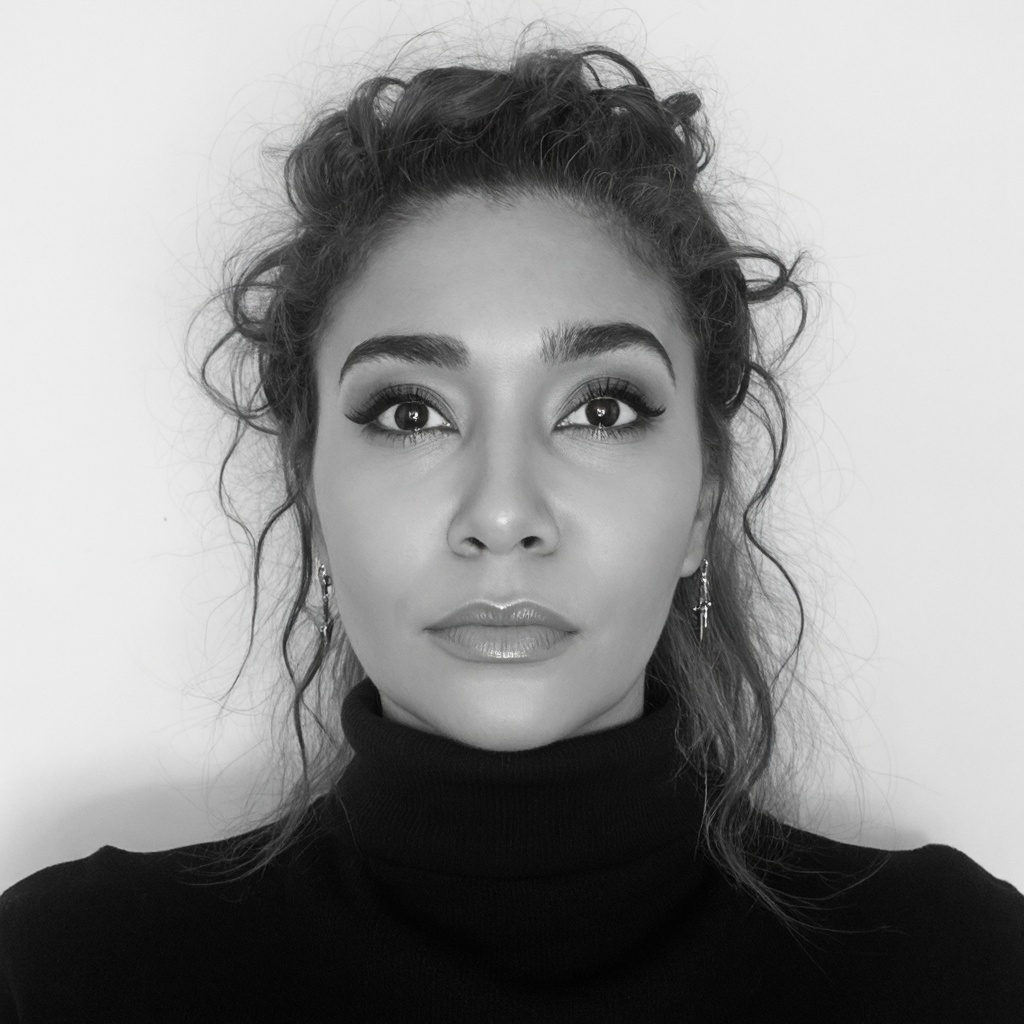
- Pimentel in 2025
- Born: Brooklyn, New York, U.S.
- Education: Roosa school of Music LaGuardia High School American Academy of Dramatic Arts
- Occupations: Actress; musician
- Notable work: Orange Is the New Black
- Spouse: Tomas Haake (m. 2015)
- Musical career
- Genres: Hardcore punk; heavy metal; grindcore
- Instruments: Vocals; guitar; bass; keyboards; violin
- Member of: Alekhine's Gun; Desolate; Brujeria
- Formerly of: Black Heart Sutra

Jessica Pimentel is an American actress and musician. She is best known for her role as Maria Ruiz on the Netflix original series Orange Is the New Black. She is also the lead singer of the metal band Alekhine's Gun and backing vocalist in the band Brujeria.

== Early life ==
Pimentel was born and raised in Cobble Hill, Brooklyn. Both of her parents, originally from La Romana, Dominican Republic, and immigrated to New York as teenagers. Pimentel was the couple's only child. Her parents divorced when she was six years old, after which she became estranged from her father.

Pimentel graduated from New York's Fiorello H. LaGuardia High School of Music & Art and Performing Arts, where she was a music major her first year then auditioned and was accepted into the drama program her second year. She focused on acting more after high school, playing Juliet in a touring production of Romeo and Juliet, and landing small roles in movies and TV shows.

She graduated from the American Academy of Dramatic Arts, class of 1999.

== Acting career ==
After a series of bit parts, Pimentel played the role of Angelique Domenguez in the 2008 film Pride and Glory. In 2014, she was cast as Floyd in four episodes of Person of Interest.

Pimentel's breakout role came in 2013, when she was cast as Maria Ruiz on the Netflix comedy-drama Orange Is the New Black. Pimentel was credited as a guest star for the first four seasons, before finally being made a part of the regular cast for Season 5.

== Music career ==
Pimentel began playing music at the age of two and trained as classical violinist and concert master who has played at Carnegie hall. In her teens she began learning the guitar, electric bass, percussion and keyboards and joined several New York Hardcore bands. She was the bassist for New York heavy metal and hardcore band Desolate from 2010 to 2014.

Since 2010, Pimentel has been the lead vocalist and a recording guitarist for the New York-based death metal band Alekhine's Gun. Pimentel has also recorded several songs with the band Black Heart Sutra, and sings in the Los Angeles and Tijuana-based metal band Brujeria, performing under the name La Bruja Encabronada.

Pimentel is a featured artist for Spector basses,, Gibson (guitar company), Korg and Darkglass and Krank Amps.

== Personal life ==
Pimentel has been married to Meshuggah drummer Tomas Haake since 2013 and lives with him in Sweden.

Pimentel was raised Christian, but became a practicing Tibetan Buddhist as an adult.

== Filmography ==
=== Films ===
Year	Title	Role	Notes
1998	The Last Days of Disco	Clubgoer	Uncredited
2005	Room	Young Mother	Uncredited
2007	Illegal Tender	Young Millie	
2008	Off Jackson Avenue	Olivia	
2008	Pride and Glory	Angelique Domenguez	
2012	How to Score Your Life	Ex-Girlfriend	
2013	Go for Sisters	La Mojada	
2014	Death Pact	Vivian	TV movie
2014	Fugly!	Caroline	
2015	The Grief of Others	Ms. Nuñez	
2018	A Bread Factory	Teresa	
2023	Bound	Marta	
2024	Hammer	Lucia	

=== Television ===
Year	Title	Role	Notes
1995	All My Children	Pine Valley Kid	2 episodes
1997	12 Angry Viewers	Juror	
2002	Third Watch	Josie	Episode: "Falling"
2003	Law & Order	Hooker	Episode: "Under God"
2005	Law & Order: Special Victims Unit	Selma Garcia	Episode: "911"
2008	Law & Order: Special Victims Unit	Joanne Suarez	Episode: "Retro"
2009	Law & Order	Tina	Episode: "Boy Gone Astray"
2010	Mercy	Female Clerk	Episode: "There Is No Superwoman
2010	Law & Order: Criminal Intent	Gabriella Belteno	Episode: "Disciple"
2013–2019	Orange Is the New Black	Maria Ruiz	Recurring role (Seasons 1–4), Series regular (Season 5–7) Screen Actors Guild Award for Outstanding Performance by an Ensemble in a Comedy Series (2015-2017)
2014	Casting Calls	Mary	
2014–2015	Person of Interest	Floyd	4 episodes
2015	Law & Order: Special Victims Unit	Manuela Ozuna	Episode: "Institutional Fail"
2023	Blue Bloods	Laura Acosta	Episode: "Lost Ones"
2023	The Horror of Dolores Roach	Flora Frias	3 Episodes

== Theater ==
Year	Title	Role	Theater
2026	Romeo & Juliet	Escalus	The Public Theater / Shakespeare in the Park
2025	Don't Eat The Mangos	Ismelda	The Huntington Theater Company
2022	Jasper	Andrea	Yonder Window / Signature Theater
2018	Surfer Girl	Girl	Animus Theater Company / The Dirty Blondes
2011	Enfrascada	Yessenia	Clubbed Thumb
2008	Aliens With Extraordinary Skills	Lupita	WP Theater
2008	Romeo & Juliet	Juliet	TheaterWorks USA
2007	The Cook	Elena / Rosa	Seattle Repertory Theater
2007	The Clean House	Mathilde	Wellfeet Harbor Actors Theater
2004	Anna in the Tropics	Marela	American Stage Theater Company
2004	A Very Old Man with Enormous Wings	Spider Woman	Shakespeare Theater of New Jersey
