= Brian Murray (actor) =

South African actor (1937–2018)

- Murray in 2007
- Born: Brian Bell; 10 September 1937; Johannesburg, South Africa
- Died: 20 August 2018 (aged 80); New York City, U.S.
- Occupations: Actor, theatre director
- Years active: 1958–2018

Brian Murray (né Bell; 10 September 1937 – 20 August 2018) was a South African actor and theatre director who was inducted into the American Theater Hall of Fame in 2004.

== Biography ==
Murray was born Brian Bell in Johannesburg, the son of Mary Dickson (née Murray) and Alfred Bell, a professional golfer.

== Career ==
Murray made his Broadway debut in the play All in Good Time in 1965. In 1967, he starred as Rosencrantz in the Broadway production of Rosencrantz and Guildenstern Are Dead, earning the first of three Tony Awards, Best Featured Actor In A Play nominations for his performance.

Murray directed the 1973 Broadway revival of The Waltz of the Toreadors. His stage directing credits include Broadway revivals of Hay Fever (1985), Arsenic and Old Lace (1986), Blithe Spirit (1987), and The Show Off (1992).

In 1998, he received the Lucille Lortel Award for outstanding body of work.

His film credits include Bob Roberts and City Hall, as well as the films of American independent filmmaker Patrick Wang. On television he has appeared in Kojak, Another World, Law & Order: Criminal Intent and 30 Rock. In the 1970s and 1980s, he performed in a number of radio plays for Yuri Rasovsky's award-winning National Radio Theater. In 2002, he provided the voice of John Silver in the Disney animated Treasure Planet, a role he reprised in the video game Treasure Planet: Battle at Procyon. He played a role in the 2009 film, My Dog Tulip.

== Death ==
Murray died of natural causes on 20 August 2018, at age 80.

== Filmography ==
=== Film ===
Year	Title	Role	Notes
1960	The Angry Silence	Gladys	
1960	The League of Gentlemen	Private "Chunky" Grogan	
1992	Bob Roberts	Terry Manchester	
1996	City Hall	Corporation Counsel	
2002	Treasure Planet	Long John Silver	Voice
2009	My Dog Tulip	Captain Pugh, Mr Blandish	Voice
2011	Dream House	Dr. Medlin	
2011	In the Family	Paul Hawks	
2018	A Bread Factory	Sir Walter	Posthumous release; final film role

=== Television ===
Year	Title	Role	Notes
1959–1966	ITV Play of the Week	John Clegg, PC Bernard Wall	Episodes: "Sugar in the Morning" & "Blue as His Eyes, the Tin Helmet He Wore"
1959	Saturday Playhouse	Stevens	Episode: "The Larford Lad"
1959	Emergency – Ward 10	Joe Masters	3 Episodes
1960	No Hiding Place	Chopper Green	Episode: "The Long Day"
1963	The Plane Makers	Tom Barnsley	Episode: "Point of Contact"
1964	Drama 61-67	Cpl. Parker, David Potter	Episodes: "Drama '64: Across the Border" & "Studio '64: The Happy Moorings"
1976	Kojak	Caesar Ogilvy	Episode: "A Summer Madness"
1978–1979	Another World	Dr. Dan Shearer #2	Unknown episodes
1990	Great Performances	Claudius	Episode: "Hamlet"
2004	Law & Order: Criminal Intent	Richard Sullivan	Episode: "The Saint"
2007	30 Rock	Jack's Dad	Episode: "The Fighting Irish"
2007	American Experience	Gouverneur Morris	Episode: "Alexander Hamilton"
2011	The Good Wife	Judge Mowbray	Episode: "The Death Zone"
2011	Person of Interest	Robert Keller	Episode: "The Fix"

=== Video games ===
Year	Title	Role	Notes
2002	Treasure Planet	Long John Silver	Voice
2002	Treasure Planet: Battle at Procyon	John Silver / Robot Silver	Voice

== Broadway ==
- Sleuth (1973)
- Da (1978)
- The Arcata Promise (1982)
- Noises Off (1983)
- A Small Family Business (1992)
- The Little Foxes (1997)
- Twelfth Night (1998)
- Uncle Vanya (2000)
- The Crucible (2002)
- The Rivals (2004)

== Radio drama ==
- A Tale of Two Cities (1977)
- The Man of Destiny (1978)
- The Killer (1979)
- Medea (1985)
- The Tempest (1985)
- The Imaginary Invalid (1985)
- The Lady of the Camellias (1985)
- An Enemy of the People (1985)
- Arms and the Man (1985)
- Uncle Vanya (1985)

== Awards and nominations ==
Awards

- 1984: Drama Desk Award for Outstanding Ensemble Work – Noises Off
- 1997: Drama Desk Award for Outstanding Featured Actor in a Play – The Little Foxes

Nominations

- 1968: Tony Award for Best Featured Actor in a Play – Rosencrantz and Guildenstern Are Dead
- 1978: Drama Desk Award for Outstanding Actor in a Play – Da
- 1992: Drama Desk Award for Outstanding Actor in a Play – A Small Family Business
- 1997: Tony Award for Best Featured Actor in a Play – The Little Foxes
- 2000: Drama Desk Award for Outstanding Featured Actor in a Play – Uncle Vanya
- 2002: Drama Desk Award for Outstanding Featured Actor in a Play – The Crucible
- 2002: Tony Award for Best Featured Actor in a Play – The Crucible
- 2002: Annie Award for Voice Acting in a Feature Production – Treasure Planet
