= In the Family (2011 film) =

2011 film by Patrick Wang

- Film Poster
- Directed by: Patrick Wang
- Written by: Patrick Wang
- Produced by: Patrick Wang; Andrew van den Houten; Robert Tonino
- Starring: Sebastian Banes; Patrick Wang; Trevor St. John
- Cinematography: Frank Barrera
- Edited by: Elwaldo Baptiste; Max Prum
- Music by: Chip Taylor; Andy Wagner; Johnny Marshall
- Production company: In The Family LLC
- Distributed by: E.D. Distribution (France) (Theatrical)
- Release date: November 4, 2011
- Running time: 169 minutes
- Country: United States
- Language: English
- Box office: $101,934

In the Family is a 2011 independent drama film that was the directorial debut of Patrick Wang. It tells the story of the surviving partner's attempt to maintain his relationship with his dead partner's young son.

== Cast ==
- Sebastian Banes as Chip Hines
- Patrick Wang as Joey Williams / Chin-Mei Lang (pre-foster name)
- Trevor St. John as Cody Hines
- Park Overall as Sally Hines
- Chip Taylor as Darryl Hines
- Kelly McAndrew as Eileen Robey
- Peter Hermann as Dave Robey
- Eisa Davis as Anne Carter
- Zoë Winters as Helene
- Christina Hogue as Cheryl
- Elaine Bromka as Gloria
- Brian Murray as Paul Hawkes
- Susan Kellerman as Marge Hawkes

== Reception ==
=== Critical response ===
The film was released to critical acclaim. Rotten Tomatoes gives a score of 97% based on 29 reviews. The website's consensus reads: "In the Family uses one couple's tragedy to examine the legal meaning of parenthood - and make a persuasive argument for a more inclusive approach to family law." On Metacritic, it scored 82 based on reviews from 9 critics, considered "universal acclaim".

Roger Ebert awarded the film 4 out of 4 stars, writing: "I was completely absorbed from beginning to end. What a courageous first feature this is, a film that sidesteps shopworn stereotypes and tells a quiet, firm, deeply humanist story about doing the right thing". Kevin Uhlich of Time Out New York awarded the film 5 out of 5 stars, and wrote "No doubt you've noticed the nearly three-hour runtime, but please don't let that dissuade you: Every moment counts in this gripping tale".

Frank Scheck of The Hollywood Reporter called the film "deeply humanistic, profoundly touching work representing independent cinema at its finest". Paul Brunick of The New York Times said, "Mr. Wang's slow-reveal psychological drama isn't just a showcase for his excellent ensemble cast. Beautifully modulated and stylistically sui generis, In the Family is also one of the most accomplished and undersold directorial debuts this year".

Rob Humanick of Slant magazine liked the film and awarded the film 4 out of 4 stars, and wrote in his review, "An acutely felt, altogether devastating family drama as intimate and affecting as it is sprawling and untamed." Robert Abele from the Los Angeles Times and said in this positive review, "Deliberate and marked by uncommon grace, In The Family manages to feel politically and culturally acute without ever resorting to melodrama, or having to wave banners for issues or causes, except perhaps in its quiet way for a renewed humanism in movies and a return to stories about everyday lives", and "These days, a movie so invested in the highs and lows of caring for others can only be a remarkable, cherished thing."

Andrew Schenker of Village Voice said of In the Family that "With an incisive understanding of character, believably naturalistic acting, and lengthy scenes that don't feel stretched out so much as given room to breathe, In the Family proves that smart direction and an innate feeling for one's material trumps potentially precious subject matter."

=== Accolades ===
The film was nominated for the Independent Spirit Award for Best First Feature in 2012.

Sebastian Banes won the Young Artist Award for Best Supporting Young Actor Age Ten and Under.

The film also received "Best Feature" awards at the San Diego Asian Film Festival, the San Francisco International Asian American Film Festival, and the Spokane International Film Festival, with Wang receiving "Best Emerging Filmmaker" awards at all three festivals, as well.
