= Undercover Blues =

- Theatrical release poster
- Directed by: Herbert Ross
- Written by: Ian Abrams
- Produced by: Mike Lobell
- Starring: Dennis Quaid; Kathleen Turner; Fiona Shaw; Stanley Tucci; Larry Miller; Park Overall; Tom Arnold
- Cinematography: Donald E. Thorin
- Edited by: Priscilla Nedd-Friendly
- Music by: David Newman
- Distributed by: Metro-Goldwyn-Mayer
- Release date: September 10, 1993
- Running time: 89 minutes
- Country: United States
- Language: English
- Budget: $20 million
- Box office: $12,324,660

Undercover Blues is a 1993 action comedy film about a family of secret agents written by Ian Abrams and directed by Herbert Ross and starring Kathleen Turner and Dennis Quaid.

== Plot ==
Jane and Jefferson Blue are a wise-cracking couple of spies for an unnamed U.S. covert organization on maternity leave in New Orleans with their baby daughter whom they dote on (though they are unable to agree on whether her name should be Louise Jane or Jane Louise). With the baby's arrival, they have decided to move on to "Chapter Two" of their marriage, retiring from field assignment in an attempt to give their daughter a normal life. While they enjoy the tourism of the city and their daughter, they are the repeated targets of a low-level mugger called 'Muerte' whom they foil with relative ease each time he tries to mug them.

Frank, their former handler from Jeff and Jane's espionage days, asks the duo for one more mission in exchange for longer maternity leave and an added bonus to their salary. The two accept and learn that a former Czech Secret Police officer, Novacek, whom the Blues had had run-ins with before, has acquired an experimental plastic explosive called C-22. Though they cannot extradite Novacek, the two are tasked with re-acquiring the explosive and capturing Novacek. As Jeff and Jane begin looking into the C-22 explosive and those rumored to be connected to Novacek, Lieutenant Sawyer of the New Orleans police continually follows the Blues; suspecting their motives for being in New Orleans. Though they continually slip through his grasp, the Blues confide in him and his partner Sergeant Halsey why they are there and whom they are looking for.

One night, a disguised Jane has Muerte contact Novacek after Jeff had planted a tracker on him during another attempted mugging at the zoo. Jeff follows the tracker with Sawyer following close behind. Though Jeff attempts to persuade Sawyer to leave as he's way over his head, Sawyer is adamant about joining him. Jane and their daughter are soon kidnapped by Novacek's minions and brought to her hideout. As Jeff demands Jane be freed, she counters by asking Jane to give up their daughter. Jane tosses a baby-disguised explosive and the group escapes to track down Novacek and the C-22 which is in a salt mine.

Jane grapples with Novacek until the latter has the upper hand. With the C-22 in a case nearby, Jeff taunts Novacek and uses a flamethrower near the case; demanding she let Jane go. Jane breaks free and kicks Novacek aside, only for a helicopter to arrive with one of Novacek's former subordinates; ready to take Novacek away. As she boards the helicopter, Novacek is promptly handcuffed and taken away to be extradited by Frank. The Blues celebrate the victory and leave New Orleans by boat but not before Muerte attempts one last mugging. Like before, they kick Muerte off the boat and toss him a life preserver before sailing towards Cuba.

== Cast ==
- Kathleen Turner as Jane Blue
- Dennis Quaid as Jefferson Blue
- Fiona Shaw as Paulina Novacek
- Stanley Tucci as Muerte
- Larry Miller as Sergeant Halsey
- Park Overall as Bonnie Newman
- Tom Arnold as Vern Newman
- Obba Babatunde as Lieutenant Sawyer
- Ralph Brown as Leamington
- Jan Triska as Axel
- Marshall Bell as Sikes
- Richard Jenkins as Frank
- Dennis Lipscomb as Foster
- Saul Rubinek as Mr. Ferderber
- Dave Chappelle as Ozzie
- Jenifer Lewis as Dorothy
- Dakin Matthews as Police Captain
- Aleksander Krupa as Zubic

== Reception ==
On the review aggregator website Rotten Tomatoes, 37% of 19 critics' reviews are positive, with an average rating of 5.1/10. On Metacritic — which assigns a weighted mean score — the film has a score of 46 out of 100 based on 19 critics, indicating "mixed or average reviews". Audiences polled by CinemaScore gave the film an average grade of "B+" on an A+ to F scale.

Jane Horwitz felt in her review for The Washington Post that "Dennis Quaid and Kathleen Turner act so darn cute in "Undercover Blues" that they risk fallen archness. It's kind of fun to watch them dance around on tiptoe instead of creating real characters, but one can't help wondering what the whole enterprise would have been like with a director who knew how to make them play against the material a little."
