= Dinah Marler =

American Daytime Soap Opera Character

- Guiding Light character
- Gina Tognoni as Dinah Marler
- Portrayed by: Jennifer Gatti (1986–1987); Paige Turco (1987–1989); Wendy Moniz (1995–1999); Gina Tognoni (2004–2009)
- Duration: 1986–1989; 1995–1999; 2004–2009
- First appearance: June 16, 1986
- Last appearance: September 18, 2009
- Created by: Mary Ryan Munisteri and Jeff Ryder
- Introduced by: Joe Willmore (1986); Jill Farren Phelps (1995); Ellen Wheeler (2004)
In-universe information
- Other names: Dinah Morgan; Dinah Carter; Dinah Adele Chamberlain Marler; Dinah Thorpe; Dinah Jessup; Princess Cassandra Winslow; Dee; Elaine Shultis
- Occupation: Former Owner of WSPR; Former Host of The Light on Springfield; Former Vice-President of Spaulding Enterprises; Former Temporary CEO of Spaulding Enterprise (sat in for Harley Cooper); Former PR Specialist at Spaulding Enterprises; Former PR Specialist (and Assistant) to D.A. Jeffrey O'Neill; Former Station Manager of WSPR; Briefly worked at Lewis Oil; Former Waitress at the nightclub, Kiyogi; Formerly mowed lawns for Sally Gleason
- Parents: Ross Marler; Vanessa Chamberlain
- Adoptive parents: John Carter; Melissa Carter
- Siblings: Bill Lewis III; Jason Marler; Kevin Marler; Maureen Reardon; Clarissa Marler
- Spouse: Roger Thorpe (1995–96); Hart Jessup (1998–99); A.C. Mallet (2007–08); Shayne Lewis (2009)
- Children: Laura Layne
- Grandparents: Emily Marler; Henry Chamberlain
- Aunts and uncles: Justin Marler; Lainie Marler; Ben Warren; Quinton Chamberlain
- First cousins: Phillip Spaulding; Samantha Marler; Drew Jacobs; Anthony James "J" Chamberlain

Dinah Marler is a fictional character from the CBS Daytime soap opera Guiding Light, last portrayed by Gina Tognoni from July 5, 2004 to September 18, 2009.

== Casting ==
The character was originated by Jennifer Gatti from June 1986 to June 1987. Paige Turco assumed the role on June 24, 1987 and played Dinah until February 1989. Wendy Moniz next portrayed the character from February 20, 1995 to March 1999. In May 2004, it was announced that former One Life to Live actress Gina Tognoni would step into the role of Dinah. She debuted in the role on July 5, 2004. Following the cancellation of Guiding Light, Tognoni last appeared on September 18, 2009.

Tognoni has won two Daytime Emmy Awards for Outstanding Supporting Actress in a Drama Series for the role in 2006 and 2008, and was also nominated in 2007.

== Storylines ==
Vanessa gave birth to Dinah at the age of seventeen in 1970 and felt she was incapable of being a good mother to her newborn at the time. With no one to turn to for help, she gave Dinah up for adoption and was reassured that her child would be adopted by a great family who would love and care for her. Dinah would have to endure a turbulent childhood and when she was reunited with her biological parents in her teenage years, the hurt and resentment she felt towards Ross and Vanessa for giving her up as a baby made it hard to forgive them. Vanessa especially received the brunt of Dinah's wrath when she learnt her mother had placed her for adoption without Ross even knowing about her existence.

After her initial adoptive parents (John and Melissa Carter) were killed in a car accident, her adoptive uncle, the late Gordon Matthews (Melissa's brother) placed her at the Little Angels Foundling Home in Springfield. In time, she would be placed with a foster family the Morgans who also took in another girl, Adele, whom Dinah became very close to. She ran away from the Morgans and found a new foster family, the Kowalskis, that worked at a carnival, but 1986, Dinah was tired of the carnival life and left for Springfield to find her long lost foster sister, Adele.

Eventually, Adele (now known as Dorie Smith) and Dinah would be reunited thanks to Phillip Spaulding's help. Dorie would go on to be adopted by India von Halkein and Dinah moved into the von Halkein residence as well. Though still resentful of him, she accepted Ross faster than Vanessa and moved in with her father eventually. Although she could hardly be civil to her mother. On the romantic front, Dinah became involved with Cameron Stewart who would break her heart when he had an affair with Lacey Bauer (Johnny's younger sister) on the side. Hurt, she turned to Alan-Michael Spaulding. Her relationship with her mother was further strained when Vanessa discovered her teenage daughter was socialising with alcoholics at wild parties thanks to her new boyfriend's influence.

Whilst on a motorcycle tour with Alan-Michael one night, her boyfriend accidentally collided with Frank Cooper's car. Frank was on his way to the hospital so his pregnant kid sister, Harley Cooper, could give birth. With no way to get to Cedars on time, Dinah delivered Harley's newborn whom the latter would name Daisy. Dinah and Harley became fast friends and the former would be there for emotional support when Harley gave Daisy up for adoption. Meanwhile, Ross and Vanessa had reunited and although Dinah was happy about that, her parents ended up separating again. Later, when Vanessa was about to leave for Venezuela, Dinah and Ross said their goodbyes and mother and daughter finally reunited. In 1988, Dinah suspected George and his criminal partner, Nicky Sutton of smuggling drugs in cars through Frank's garage. Although she tried to tell Cam, he refused to believe her and pushed her away. As for Cam, he made up with his father but, one day, he witnessed George with Nicky at Spaulding Enterprises and finally realized that George had not changed as he claimed. One day, when Dinah was alone in the Stewart house with George, she tried to get George to leave Cam alone. George getting angry with Dinah and nearly acting on his sexual obsession with the under aged Dinah came after her and nearly raped her. Fortunately Cam was visiting Ross, and Cam realized that Dinah was at his house with his father and not at Ross's as Dinah had led to believe. Cam and Ross raced over to the Stewart house and got George to stop before Dinah was raped. Springfield P.D. Lt. Larry Wyatt tried to get Cam and Dinah to see that it was not wise for them to set up George, but both of the teens refused to listen, but Lt. Wyatt got Cam and Dinah to agree to let him be nearby when George was arrested. On the day Rusty was arresting Nicky, George ran from Nicky and back home with the last drug buy that George was going to make from the man. Cam and Dinah on a tip from Rose McClaren came home with Lt. Wyatt waiting right outside and when George came home he first started abusing both Cam and Dinah until the bag of coke he bought from Nicky came falling out of his pocket onto the kitchen floor. Lt. Wyatt came in and arrested George right on the spot. Meanwhile, Alan-Michael had enough of Dinah being involved with Cam's personal problems and he and Dinah broke up. So Dinah and Cam were free and got involved again. Not long after, Dinah and Cam were surprised to learn of Alan-Michael and Harley's engagement. In February 1989 Dinah departed Springfield to go to college in Paris and Cameron followed her.

Dinah (now Wendy Moniz) returned to Springfield in 1995 a changed woman, sophisticated and spoiled from living in Europe. Although Ross and Vanessa thought she was on break from school, they were shocked to discover that she had dropped out. While Dinah tried to pass herself off as a wealthy debutant, Ross's new wife, Blake, and Henry suspected that Dinah was in fact broke. While staying at Vanessa's, Dinah alienated herself from Vanessa's fiancé, Matt Reardon, by flirting with him. Days later, Dinah was shocked when she came across an old acquaintance named Viktor Pasternak. As Dinah was telling Viktor about her money problems, she mentioned that her grandfather has a huge trust fund, but she will not receive a penny of it until she is married. However, Viktor had a plan. That same day, Vanessa learned of Dinah's money woes and since Dinah's flirtatious ways were grating on Matt, she suggested that Dinah live with Ross and Blake. Although Blake was not happy about the situation, she caved in and let Dinah move into the carriage house. However, like Matt, Blake did not totally trust Dinah either and decided to find out what her new stepdaughter was up to. For Blake her plan was not totally successful; not only could not she make out who Dinah was speaking with, while she listened in on her, but Dinah caught on and starting speaking in code with Viktor. As Dinah continued to annoy Blake with her smoking and general selfishness, she had her parents, especially Ross, were wrapped around her little finger. Meanwhile, Dinah had found a perfect way to get money—she had arranged for Viktor to kidnap her and they would split the ransom money. For Dinah, Viktor double crossed her and left her tied up while he decided to ask for more money (which he would keep for himself. The family received Viktor's ransom demand and Matt convinced everyone that he had taken the money to the location Viktor had mentioned. Knowing that Dinah's life was in danger. When Matt left the briefcase at the specified location near the railroad tracks for Viktor, instead of going back home, he instinctively went to the abandoned underground factory and found Dinah there tied up and gagged. He immediately released her gag, while Viktor found the money and headed back to the abandoned factory. Viktor arrived just as Matt was almost done untying the rope around Dinah's hands. Viktor got away but was later caught when trying to fly out of Springfield. Ross and Vanessa were extremely disappointed in their daughter for her behavior and her scheming ways.

Angry at her parents, Dinah lashed out by having sex with the town villain, Roger Thorpe, who was Blake's father. In an effort to get Roger away from their daughter, Ross and Vanessa used Roger's visitation rights for Peter (since he was Peter's grandfather) as a weapon. Livid at their using Peter, Roger vowed to find his son, Hart, and tell him about Peter (since he had no idea he fathered a child) and then use him to get custody of Peter. Roger eventually found Hart and when strain in Roger's marriage to Dinah emerged, Hart got Dinah to have sex with him and then gleefully revealed the fact to his enraged dad. Little did anyone realize that Roger had been busy embezzling all of Dinah's trust fund money. While trying to patch things up with Dinah, his lawyer and confidante, former DA Leo Flynn, was "doctoring" his financial books to make it look like Roger had lost the money in a bad investment, it was actually stashed away in the Cayman Islands. When he was about to have to go to court to reveal what he had done with the money, Roger took some pills and faked a heart attack to dodge court. His ploy nearly worked; Dinah almost fell back into Roger's grasp, but Hart learned that his father had stolen Dinah's money and showed Dinah the proof. Already angry with Roger for his thievery, Dinah got worse when she was told Roger had faked his heart attack. She bought a gun and went into Roger's hospital room with the intention of killing him. Luckily, Hart dragged her off before she pulled the trigger.

The two conducted a plan to make Roger believe he was losing his mind. Dinah decided not to divorce Roger and then she and Hart did all kinds of things to make Roger question his mental faculties. Roger did not realize what was happening because he thought Dinah and Hart hated each other and that she was an airhead. For him, Dinah and Hart began to fall in love. It was a slow process, but it drove Roger mad and violent. He attacked Hart several times, choked Dinah with a scarf, began drugging Dinah and tried to convince her to kill herself while on it. Hart eventually caught on to his father's malevolent plot and saved Dinah. Now, they both decided to kick their plan into high gear. Hart confronted Roger at Laurel Falls with a vial of the drugs and threatened to the police Roger had been trying to drive his wife insane in an effort to cover up the fact he robbed her blind ever since he had married her. A fearful Roger pulled a gun on Hart and the two struggled. The gun went off and Hart was shot. A despondent Roger, believing he had "murdered" his own son, buried Hart. However, this was merely part of the clever plot against him; Hart was not dead, the bullet had been a blank and he had been wearing a blood pack. Roger's mental state dramatically declined and got worse after he accidentally drank an entire vial of the drugs he had been poisoning Dinah with. The drug was pumped out of his system, but he was left strapped down to a hospital bed after he had tried to strangle Dinah. Finally, at a fair, Hart revealed himself to Roger in front of the entire town. A whacked-out Roger could not believe his eyes and admitted to everyone that he had shot Hart. Suddenly after Dinah refused to corroborate Roger's story, he realized he had been set up all along and attacked his son. It took two cops to subdue him and Roger was eventually sent to a mental institution. After learning Dinah had retrieved her money from the Cayman Islands, Roger set out to escape the mental hospital and prove he had been set up. After escaping, he then disguised himself and broke into Hart's apartment and found a picture of Hart and Dinah together in the Caymans, disproving their claim they hated each other and validating his argument they had been in collusion all along. Bridget Reardon (fearing that Hart, the father of her child, might go to jail) switched photos and when Roger showed it to the judge, it was really a picture of Peter. Roger was carted back off to the loony bin. After a failed escape attempt, Dinah authorized the psychiatrists to give Roger "shock treatment" to cure him of violent impulses. At a second competency hearing, Hart and Dinah were discovered together and a "kind, benevolent" Roger, he had never undergone the shock therapy and was pretending, was finally released from the mental hospital.

Dinah got a surprise visit from her old lover from France, Jean-Luc. Jean Luc and Dinah had lived together for two years and he told Hart that he regretted kicking her out and wanted her back. Dinah told him that she would handle him. She told Jean Luc that she was still mad at him for throwing her out and that they were together a long time ago. She was a different person now. Upon learning that Hart and Dinah were engaged, Jean Luc jokingly inquired how many fiancées this makes for Dinah and told Hart that love did not last with Dinah no matter whom she was with. Although Dinah and Hart thought Jean Luc's appearance in Springfield was innocent, he was actually paid by Roger to break up the couple. To succeed in his goal, Jean Luc visited Dinah again and pledged his love for her. When she rejected him by pointing out that he had been interested in her only for her money, and that he had dumped her previously, Jean Luc merely reminisced about the good days with her. Jean Luc pointed out that she would eventually tire of the farm and that a girl like her could never make a man like Hart happy for long. However, things between Dinah and Hart would get worse without Jean Luc's help. It soon became obvious that Dinah was insecure of her role in Hart's life and was not quite the type of woman to stay on the farm. Things got tenser after a trip to Switzerland, where Jean Luc arranged for Dinah to be reunited by her jet-setting friends.

Although Dinah was enjoying herself, it was apparent that Hart was not and he was further dismayed when her friends followed her to Springfield. Not understanding how Dinah could have such shallow friends, Hart confided his frustrations to Bridget, which only fueled Dinah's jealousy. Finally, fearing she was about to lose Hart, Dinah agreed to tell her friends that they had to leave. Believing Jean Luc's words that Hart was trying to turn her into a domestic type, Dinah made a turnaround and refused to tell her friends to leave. Although she and Hart tried to settle their differences, she kept finding herself drawn to the jet-setting life and finally the couple decided they were incompatible and broke up in 1997. Her mother had mysteriously died but was later found alive and well; she had been battling an illness and when told that passing on the illness was a possibility, Dinah began to have second thoughts about having children with Hart, whom she had eventually reunited with, something that did not please him. When Dinah continued to have doubts about having children, despite Hart's having learned from Vanessa's doctor that the possibility was slight, it became apparent that perhaps Dinah just did not want to have children. Although she later agreed to "let nature take its course", Dinah secretly began taking birth control pills.

In the meantime, Dinah was becoming increasingly jealous of Hart's new friend--Cassie Layne, an ex-stripper who was trying to raise money to get her daughter out of foster care. Dinah eventually lost Hart, due to her meddling in Cassie's quest to get her daughter back. Dinah started obsessing with finding a way to win him back, alienating herself from her family. Knowing that Hart could not resist the maternal-type, Dinah borrowed a baby and set it up so Hart would see her caring for a child. Her plan worked with Hart believing that Dinah had changed and they reconciled. Later, Dinah was devastated when Hart broke their engagement saying that he no longer loved her. Making matters worse was that Vanessa sympathized with Cassie and told Dinah that she needed to move on with her life. Afterwards, Dinah decided to focus her energies on getting Hart back. Having found Cassie's ex-husband, Rob, at a halfway house in Chicago, Dinah asked him to come to Springfield to help break-up Cassie and Hart. Dinah further enticed him with the concept that she had help him get custody of Tammy, Cassie's daughter. When her plans did not work, she accused Cassie of having an affair with Josh. At the same time, Dinah became convinced that Cassie was keeping a secret, along with Vanessa's doctor, Michael Burke, and decided to find out what exactly Cassie was up to. Dinah broke into Michael's apartment to see what she could find. While she could not find anything, it was apparent that Cassie was keeping a secret from Hart and that was damaging their relationship.

One day, a drunken Hart showed up at Dinah's doorstep and she took advantage of the situation by telling him later that they had had sex. Later, she then had sex with Rob so that she would become pregnant. The plan worked and Dinah told Hart that she was pregnant with his child. Marcus, a friend, who figured out what Dinah had done, tried to convince her to do the right thing; she was obsessed with getting Hart back and went along with the lie. After having a slight scare, Dinah lied to Hart that she was having a troubled pregnancy. Pleased when Hart vowed to stay by Dinah during her pregnancy, ultimately Cassie would not leave Hart. Wanting to put a cramp in their relationship, Dinah gave Hart an ultimatum, either her and the baby or Cassie. Cassie soon learned of Dinah and Rob's tryst. Dinah later was able to bribe the doctor to convince Hart that a test was too dangerous. Tragically, days after learning that Cassie herself was pregnant, Dinah miscarried: while sneaking around by the farm, she was accidentally hit by a door by Hart, who wanted to see who was trespassing. She then used his guilt as well as her mother's blood pressure pills to con him into staying with her. Later, when she became ill from over-medicating herself, she conned Hart into marrying her by claiming to be dying. Although the plan worked, Hart was still drawn to Cassie, who had decided to lie to Hart by claiming the child she was carrying was not his. Determined to keep Hart with her, Dinah set fire to the farm. The fire left Dinah with terrible scars on her face, which made Hart feel more responsible to her. However, Hart was shocked when he overheard Dinah and Vanessa talking and discovered that he was the father of Cassie's baby. Though Dinah tried to convince him that she kept the truth from him because she loved him and wanted him to stay, he did not buy it and left her. Although Vanessa again implored Dinah to get professional help, Dinah insisted that all she needed was Hart. Thinking her sister was picking her up, Cassie got into the car only to find Dinah behind the wheel. Dinah then locked the doors and drove into a snowstorm, ranting about how Cassie's ruined her life. Worked up Dinah, skidded into a snow bank and the car got stuck. Just then, Cassie started to go into labor but Dinah did not believe her. Frantic, Cassie called Hart on his cell phone and he headed into the storm to find her. Angry, Dinah moved off telling Cassie to let Hart save her. However, Dinah returned to the car, realized that Cassie was serious and the baby may not make it without her help. So, Dinah acted and delivered the baby. Just then Hart arrived, thrilled and relieved to find Cassie and see his son for the first time.

Totally unbalanced by now, Dinah got angry with Hart for rejecting her and retaliated by breaking into his room at the Springfield Inn. Desperate to hold on to Hart, Dinah finally revealed the lengths she had gone to keep him – taking Vanessa's pills, which almost killed her, and starting the fire that scarred her. Shocked, Hart called Vanessa, telling her to get her daughter. That day, Dinah became distressed when Vanessa mentioned having her committed, and she called her father to come help her. Dinah then moved in with her father, Ross. However, although she was able to fool him into thinking she was alright, it was clear that Hart was not out of her system. Then Cassie learned the truth about the child Dinah miscarried, and knowing that that was her only link to Hart, Dinah tried to appeal to Cassie. When that did not work, she grabbed the one antique gun Hart left behind. Dinah aimed the antique gun at Cassie, who plead with Dinah to realize that Hart would find out Laura was not his baby one way or another. At that moment, Hart walked in and jumped in front of Cassie as Dinah pulled the trigger. He was critically wounded, and as a devastated Dinah fled to her mother for help, Cassie had Hart rushed to the hospital. Vanessa was devastated by what her daughter did and wanted Dinah to explain the accidental shooting to the police but Dinah insisted that she would kill herself first, and Vanessa decided to hide her. Before leaving, a desperate Dinah went to Cedars to see Hart. As he was going into cardiac arrest, Dinah confronted him and shook him in her attempt to convince him that the shooting was accidental. As machines started to go off, Dinah debated whether to stay with Hart or save herself. She wound up fleeing as doctors arrived to revive Hart and ran smack into Matt in the hospital parking garage. Matt grabbed Dinah and planned to turn her in, but backed down when Dinah revealed that her mother would never forgive him. Days later, Vanessa arranged for Dinah to fly to Switzerland where the nuns who took care of her during her illness would help Dinah disappear. After mother and daughter shared a heartfelt good-bye, Dinah fled Springfield. There would be no word about Dinah until the summer of 2000 when she contacted her mother saying that she needed help: she was pregnant. Dinah was mentioned in June 2002 when Ross saw Vanessa at Josh and Reva Lewis's wedding. Curiously there was no mention of her having had a baby.

The truth about what Dinah had been doing would come to light in the summer of 2004 when Cassie discovered that a mysterious woman, in Europe, was using her credit cards. The mystery became even more intriguing when she realized the woman was posing as Princess Cassandra Winslow, herself. Not long after, Jeffrey O'Neill, the Springfield D.A., tracked Dinah (now Gina Tognoni) down and warned her that he would prosecute her if she continued impersonating Cassie. Far from being concerned, Dinah instead flirted with Jeffrey, bringing to mind when they met two years ago—when he rescued Dinah (who had miscarried her baby) who was languishing in a European prison. But Jeffrey's rescue had a price—in exchange she had to help him, by impersonating her old rival Cassie, who to Dinah's utter shock, was now married to an actual Prince, Richard Winslow, a dead-ringer for Jeffrey. Cassie was eventually widowed and living in Springfield, where Jeffrey now lived as well. Although Jeffrey thought that he had scared Dinah, but she continued masquerading as the Princess. After Cassie almost caught her, Dinah decided to go back to Springfield, in disguise since she was still wanted for Hart's murder. In Springfield, Dinah contacted Ross, who urged Dinah to turn herself in, which she did. Soon Dinah made her way to the Jessup farm where she came face to face with Hart's son, R.J. Introducing herself as his imaginary friend, she convinced the boy to keep her existence a secret. In the meantime, Dinah offered Edmund a deal to work together and ensure that Jeffrey never got too close to Cassie. Dinah admitted she had her sights set on Jeffrey and against his better judgment, Edmund created an alliance with her. Later, Dinah secretly called Jeffrey to convince him she was still safe and sound in Europe. However, when he learned that a mysterious person was stalking Cassie, even trying to kill her. Jeffrey continued to hunt for Dinah, finally finding her in Bill's apartment. He tried to threaten her into leaving town, again but she broke down his defenses and the pair almost wound up having sex. Soon after, Dinah began actively stalking Cassie. Yet, Jeffrey kept quiet, instead trying to handle Dinah himself and urging her to give up her obsessive vendetta against Cassie. Deciding to get rid of Dinah once and for all, Jeffrey put her on a plane to Europe under guard, however, Dinah bribed a lookalike to take her place while she stayed in Springfield. Things finally came to a head one stormy night at the Jessup farm. Upon arriving at the barn, Dinah spotted Edmund knocking Jeffrey out with a shovel. The blow caused Jeffrey, who was holding a candle to fall, and the barn went up in flames. Edmund was able to drag Jeffrey to safety, while unbeknownst to them, Cassie entered the burning barn and spotted RJ trapped at the top level. Cassie became trapped under falling debris, but Dinah saved the day by rescuing RJ and alerting Edmund and Jeffrey to Cassie. Dinah was finally caught and sent to jail for Hart's death. The key witness was Cassie. As the sole witness to the shooting, if Cassie stated that Dinah was not in sound mind during the shooting—then Dinah would go free. Hoping to facilitate her release, Dinah tried to convince both Cassie and Blake that she was truly remorseful about Hart's death. Although Blake remained convinced that Dinah should stay behind bars, Cassie decided it was not worth the emotional rigors and stated that Hart's shooting was an accident.

Dinah, despite being warned to forget about Cassie and move on with her life, decided to take from Cassie what was taken from her. So, deciding to steal Edmund away from Cassie, Dinah set it up so he would spot her drunkenly attempting to strip in a bar. Trying to avoid her making a scene, Edmund found her and dragged her out. Confronted by Edmund, Dinah turned on the tears and bemoaned to Edmund that she did not know how to change. As she had hoped, Edmund softened toward her and let her spend the night in his hotel suite. Meanwhile, Dinah continued to fuel Edmund's jealousy of Jeffrey by setting it up so he would see a picture of Jeffrey (as Richard) with Cassie in Jeffrey's apartment. Dinah gained the trust of Cassie's daughter, Tammy. She then gave Tammy her car keys and suggested that she go away to think. With Tammy gone, Dinah decided to play with Cassie's head and, disguising her voice, informed Cassie that Tammy was trying to get a job as a stripper in Chicago. She then informed Jeffrey that she told Tammy to go to Chicago, setting it up so the two could leave together. Although the pair failed to find Tammy, Dinah's machinations further drove a wedge between Cassie and Edmund because Cassie continually relied on Edmund. Dinah then seduced Jeffrey, but he discovered her true motive for the seduction when he found out that she had poked holes in his condom. Realizing this was all about getting pregnant so she could have a life like Cassie's, Jeffrey blasted Dinah and threw her out. Dinah initially taunted him by implying that she was pregnant, but was later devastated to learn that she was not. By the end of the year, Dinah was more jealous than ever of Cassie's impending marriage to Edmund and sought to destroy it by suggesting to R.J. that he saw Edmund hit Jeffrey over the head the night of the fire. That night, RJ told Jeffrey, who went to Dinah for confirmation. Dinah confirmed what she had seen and then encouraged Jeffrey to tell Cassie what he had learned.

In 2005, Dinah was pleasantly surprised to see Cassie's trouble-making nephew Jonathan Randall head up to Cassie's room at the Beacon. Figuring that Cassie was setting Jonathan up (so his mother would see him taking advantage of an "inebriated" Cassie), Dinah put a wrench in her plans by first hanging a Do Not Disturb sign outside Cassie's door and then kept Reva from going up to Cassie's room with a story about calling Edmund to the hotel. The next morning, the day of Cassie and Edmund's wedding, Dinah summoned Edmund to the hotel. By the time Edmund got to Cassie's room, Jonathan had slipped out. However, thanks to Jonathan's drugging of Cassie and implying that they had had sex, a shaken Cassie almost did not attend her own wedding. In the meantime, Dinah distressed Bill by admitting to him that she was in love with Edmund. After learning that Edmund and Cassie did marry, a devious Dinah revealed to Edmund that she knew the reason why Cassie nearly did not make it to the altar. Although she was just teasing him with the information, without giving him any, Edmund was intrigued. Meanwhile, Dinah was pleased when Blake informed her that she had dropped the restraining order against her, out of gratitude for not ruining Cassie's wedding day. However, Dinah was still intent on breaking up the happy couple and decided to help fuel Edmund's growing jealousy by anonymously sending Cassie flowers.

Bill was still concerned about Dinah's obsession over Edmund and his wife. Knowing that Cassie and Edmund were trying to get pregnant, it did not take long for Dinah to start pumping Corey, an OB-GYN who was a blind date, for information on modern fertility methods. Though Dinah tried to get her hands on some fertility drugs, she ended up being caught by Corey. Later, Dinah piqued Jonathan's interest when she told him about the fire in the barn. Eventually, Cassie figured out that Dinah knew what happened the night before her wedding and after a confrontation, the two got into a catfight that was broken up by Ross. Days later, after being accused of setting a small fire to the barn (Jonathan had done it), Dinah finally told Edmund what she knew about Jonathan and Cassie. Angry beyond belief, Edmund raced off to confront Jonathan while Dinah went and told Cassie what Edmund knew. Although Cassie came face to face with Edmund's violent side when she saw him beating up Jonathan, she still stayed loyal to him. At the same time, in celebration of what they thought would be the end of Cassie and Edmund's marriage, Dinah and Jonathan became lovers. They then hatched another plan to destroy the Winslow marriage by telling Cassie's sister, Reva, about Edmund causing the fire, hoping Reva would tell Cassie. Soon after, Ross, Blake, Bill, and a visiting Matt staged an intervention to convince Dinah to leave town. That only succeeded in alienating Dinah from everyone when she became convinced that their motivation was to protect Cassie. Days later, the Winslow family was dealt a devastating blow when Cassie finally learned that Edmund had been responsible for the barn fire.

With Edmund vulnerable, Dinah convinced him to let her carry his and Cassie's embryo (which had been frozen and was ready for implementation), convincing him that it would help him get Cassie back. Although he was skeptical of her motives, despite her insistence that she was trying to redeem herself, when Edmund learned that Cassie was leaving him, he desperately agreed to the plan. To cover himself legally, Edmund had Dinah sign a contract stating that she would voluntarily give up the child at birth. He then invited Dinah to stay at the farm so he could take care of her. Although Dinah tried to get closer to Edmund by offering him tips on how to win back Cassie, all her efforts only reminded her of the sacrifice she was making. Dinah finally informed Cassie that she was pregnant with her and Edmund's baby. Although sickened with the revelation that her hated rival was pregnant with her child, Cassie had no choice but to accept the situation. However, she refused to reunite with Edmund. During the surrogacy, Dinah was determined to make Edmund fall in love with her. When she miscarries the baby, she continues to pretend she is pregnant.

Meanwhile, Cassie showers Dinah with kindness out of gratitude for carrying her child. Extremely uncomfortable, Dinah wanted to tell Cassie the truth, but Edmund kept putting it off. Finally one night Edmund convinced Dinah that they should simply disappear without ever telling Cassie the truth. He convinced Dinah to record a goodbye message to Ross. After recording the message, Dinah suddenly heard the sound of a baby crying. Edmund immediately covered her mouth with a chloroform rag and she fell to the floor, unconscious. When she awoke, Dinah found herself being held captive in an exact replica of the Jessup farmhouse. She then came face to face with Edmund. After railing at him for setting her up and leaving her alone, Dinah was shocked when he cruelly told her that everything went according to plan and he and Cassie will soon be reunited. He leaves Dinah there, devastated and trapped. Having just read that Michelle Bauer lost her baby in a car accident, Dinah realized that Edmund had stolen Michelle's baby and given it to Cassie. Later, Dinah swiped Edmund's cell phone and later used it to call Cassie. was with Cassie when her phone starts to ring and he answered the call first and covered. Dinah finally tried to reason with Edmund and convince him that his plan would not work, to which Edmund refused to listen. Dinah repeatedly tried to escape Edmund but failed each time. At the same time, Jonathan was shocked to learn that Dinah's baby was born, since he knew she miscarried. Concerned about Dinah, he followed Edmund and found himself outside the recreated farmhouse where Edmund was keeping Dinah. Jonathan was later called away. Unnerved by his close call, Edmund threatened to stop giving Dinah food if she did not find a way to deter Jonathan. So Dinah sent him off with a note to Jonathan that would throw him off her trail. Worried that she would not get out alive, Dinah decided to trick Edmund by hiding in a crevice in the farmhouse. Her plan worked, for when Edmund returned he could not find her. Instead of just leaving the door unlocked as Dinah thought he would, a panicked Edmund locked it behind him and later set fire to it. At the same time, Dinah had stolen Edmund's cell phone again and was using it to call Cassie, unaware that the place was on fire. Although she got through, the signal was lost. Then suddenly realizing a fire was raging around her, she tried to get out but was overcome by the smoke and passed out. Luckily, Detective A.C. Mallet, who had been investigating Edmund happened by and rescued her. Noticing her attention on the cell phone, he pressed redial and got in touch with Cassie, telling her he had found the missing Dinah. That night, Dinah was taken to Cedars where she apologized to Cassie for all she had done. Then in an act of atonement, she took baby Hope and gave her to her rightful father—Danny Santos.

After the ordeal with Edmund ended, Dinah began a relationship with Mallet, who was pegged with keeping an eye on her. He stopped her from shooting Edmund. Although she was attracted to Mallet, Dinah had been burned too many times by men and resolved to swear off them. It took some time but eventually a bond formed between the two and they became lovers Soon after, in 2006, Dinah became increasingly insecure about Mallet's feelings for Harley, his ex-wife. It did not help that Mallet would frequently drop everything to help Harley who was distraught over the fact that Gus was missing. Despite being jealous, Dinah was determined to be a supportive friend to Harley. Later, Mallet shocked Dinah by asking her to move in with him. Still not secure, a wary Dinah asked if this was his way of telling Harley that he is tired of being her back-up guy. Mallet spoke from his heart, telling Dinah how much she meant to him. Dinah was moved and they had sex. The next day, Dinah and Mallet had a small dinner party where they announced the news. However, the occasion was marred when Mallet got a call from Harley and rushed out to help her.

Mallet gave Dinah some horrible news—Ross's private plane lost contact shortly after take-off and crashed. It was discovered that Ross was traveling with his female assistant, Nicole Landers. Immediately suspecting her father was having an affair, Dinah ranted about him abandoning his wife and children to go to Washington DC. She was only silenced when Blake slapped her face and yelled at Dinah to not speak about her father that way. Dinah returned to make peace, stating that her half-siblings are all she had left of her father. Dinah begged Blake not to shut her out. Blake told her that what she said about her father was true, but they were never to speak about it again.

Dinah and Mallet would eventually become engaged. Vanessa was certain that Dinah had finally grown up and met the man of her dreams, but Matt was extremely skeptical that this wedding was ever going to happen and made that abundantly clear to Vanessa, Dinah and Mallet. When Mallet pressed Matt about his negative attitude, Matt stated that Dinah was the most self-destructive person he had ever met. However, when an upset Dinah professed her love for Mallet and vowed that she would not mess this up, Matt apologized for letting the past color his feelings. Vanessa also apologized for pressuring her about the details but stated that she wanted the wedding to be perfect. Her choice of words got Dinah angry and she blurted out that her wedding would not be perfect, especially since her father could not walk her down the aisle. At that point, Matt surprised her by offering to do it, with Vanessa offering to hang on her other arm. But the wedding went on hold after Dinah, who had an argument with Mallet, supposedly set the Beacon ablaze and Mallet was seriously injured.

Mallet confronted Dinah and begged her to admit that she started the fire. Dinah confessed the truth about the fire. Realizing that Jeffrey O'Neill had the charges dropped to get Dinah under his thumb, Mallet tried to convince her that they could fight the charges since it was an accident. However, Dinah refused to take the risk of going back to prison and warned him if he told anyone what she did, she would deny it. She then told him to let their relationship go. Soon after, word got out about Dinah and Jeffrey's meetings because Blake approached Dinah to persuade Dinah that losing Mallet would be a mistake since he was so much like Ross. Dinah saw through her act and accused Blake of wanting Jeffrey all to herself. After Mallet and Dinah both flirted with other people, Mallet finally carried Dinah off so they could talk. As their song began to play, along with slides of their past, Mallet admitted to Dinah that he wanted to marry her; she agreed. They decided to get married right then and there, until Dinah came face to face with Jeffrey. Jeffrey informed Dinah that his cohorts at the government wanted to ruin him, but eventually Dinah would be exonerated and the two would marry. In the last episode, Mallet and Dinah got back together and possibly married.

Dinah volunteers at a hospital and finds an injured soldier who calls her out on helping others to make herself feel better about her life. Annoyed Dinah paces, irritated at the soldier's suggestion. Dinah resolves to help him one way or another, but he slaps her hand away as he struggles with his wheelchair. Later, Dinah finds her crippled soldier starting a fight at a bar and stares at him in disbelief. He does not seem to care when Dinah mentions that the other man in the fight could have killed him. Dinah tells him that she is from Springfield. He angrily wheels himself away as he tells her to remind him not to visit. After he leaves, Dinah finds a watch on the floor and realizes who it belongs to. The soldier talks to the military officer and it becomes clear that the soldier is Shayne Lewis. However, Dinah does not know this. Shayne arrives back in Springfield in December. He does not tell anyone that he is in town until the day of Marina and Mallet's Wedding. Shayne then picks a fight with Mallet. Since Dinah and Shayne's first meeting, they became closer. On August 3, 2009, Dinah married Joshua "Shayne" Lewis.
