= Tainted (film) =

- Film poster
- Directed by: Orestes Matacena
- Written by: Orestes Matacena
- Produced by: Orestes Matacena; Phyllis Redden
- Starring: Shari Shattuck; Park Overall; Gene Tootle
- Cinematography: Ramón F. Suárez
- Edited by: Stephen Sheppard
- Music by: Hayden Wayne
- Production company: Cardinal Pictures International
- Distributed by: Gloria Video; South Gate Entertainment
- Release date: March 21, 1987
- Country: United States
- Language: English

Tainted is a 1987 American film written and directed by Orestes Matacena and starring Shari Shattuck. The film is a low-budget suspense drama about Cathy (Shattuck) a young school teacher married to the owner of a crematorium. It is centered on Cathy's attempt to cover-up the murder of an intruder who attempted to rape her. The cover up of the rape is due to the man that raped her being her ex-husband in the film.

== Cast ==
- Shari Shattuck as Cathy
- Park Overall as Marion
- Gene Tootle as Frank
- Magilla Schaus as Tom
- Blaque Fowler as Rapist
- Robb Taylor as Principal
- Ruben Rabasa as Security Guard
- Ann Gillman Martin as Mrs. Kent
- Tom Murray as Lawyer
- Dean Biasucci as Scott
- Jerita Wright as Music Teacher
- Van Vandorin as Priest
- Chip Webster as Builder
- Kevin McKee as Doctor
- Pat Fuleman as Funeral Client
- Hall Austin as Funeral Client
- Bruce Roberts as Police Officer
- Charlie Fender as Police Officer
- Tom Conder as Police Officer
- Carl Grosshesn as Police Officer
- Donnie Park as Police Officer
- Larry Butts as Police Officer
- Tom Russell as Police Officer
- Dan Wood as Police Officer
- Sandy Jackson as Police Officer
- David Perez as Police Officer
- Jerry Staton as Police Officer
- Dean Keiserman as Street Fighter
- Sid Williams as Street Fighter
- Michael Tarring as Street Fighter
- Bobby Boles as Music Teacher's Husband
- Harold Austin as Punk
- Todd Overguard as Punk
- Brian T. Finney as Punk
- Brian Weig as Punk
- Benny Sutton as Punk
- Loren Laney as Dancer
- Wendy Postom as Nurse
- Keith as Student with Slingshot
- Ida Pearle as Violinist
- Lee Moldoom as Chef
- Lee Anne Barton as Student
- Ted Shoddy as Bulldozer Operator
- Mary Ellis as Secretary
- Kip Munnicutt as Ambulance Driver
- Rick Mott as Paramedic
