= The Year We Thought About Love =

- Directed by: Ellen Brodsky
- Produced by: Ellen Brodsky; Associate Producer, Pam Chamberlain
- Release date: January 31, 2015 (Santa Barbara Film Festival)
- Running time: 68 minutes
- Country: United States

The Year We Thought About Love is a 2015 feature-length documentary film about the LGBTQ theater group, True Colors: OUT Youth Theater, directed by Ellen Brodsky. As of December 2015, the film has been seen in 21 states and 6 countries with a DVD available to community groups, public libraries, community colleges, and colleges and universities.

== Synopsis ==
The film focuses on a Boston-based group of LGBTQ youth of color band together and dare to be 'out' on stage about their lives and their loves. The cast of True Colors: OUT Youth Theater transforms their struggles into performance for social change. The film's cast members include a transgender teenager, Alyssa, who is kicked out of her home; a devout Christian, Chi, who challenges his church's homophobia; and a genderqueer individual, Ayden, who likes to wear masculine clothing, even as they model dresses on the runway. After the Boston Marathon bombs explode yards from their rehearsal space, the troupe becomes even more determined to share their stories of love to help their city heal.

== Production notes ==
The Year We Thought About Love was filmed in Boston and premiered at the Santa Barbara International Film Festival on January 31, 2015.

== Awards ==
Awards
Award	Date of ceremony	Category	Recipients and nominees	Result
Southwest Gay and Lesbian Film Festival Best Documentary Award	October 22, 2015	Audience Selection	Ellen Brodsky	Won
16th Annual Social Justice Award for Documentary Film	January 30, 2015	Social Justice Award for Documentary Film	Ellen Brodsky	Nominated

=== 2016 National Arts and Humanities Youth Program Award ===
True Colors: Out Youth Theater was one of the 12 winners of the 2016 National Arts and Humanities Youth Program Award and the first LGBTQ organization ever to receive this award. The group was invited to the White House on November 15, 2016, to receive the award from Michelle Obama.
