= A. Rimbaud =

2026 film by Patrick Wang

- Directed by: Patrick Wang
- Written by: Patrick Wang
- Produced by: Fritzi Adelman; Daryl Freimark; Evan Johnson; Patrick Wang
- Starring: Blake Draper
- Cinematography: Frank Barrera
- Edited by: John Gurdebeke
- Music by: Dan Schlosberg
- Production companies: Hardball Entertainment; Thin Stuff Productions
- Release date: May 12, 2026 (Roxy Theatre)
- Running time: 175 minutes
- Countries: Canada; United States
- Language: English

A. Rimbaud is a 2026 experimental biographical film film written, produced and directed by Patrick Wang and starring Blake Draper, the sole actor in the film, as poet Arthur Rimbaud.

== Synopsis ==
Follows Arthur Rimbaud from his teen years in Paris to his later years in Abyssinia.

== Production ==
Blake Draper is the only actor to appear in the film, with the other characters in Rimbaud's life are represented by musical instruments. The majority of the film was filmed within a black box theatre.

== Release ==
The film premiered at the Roxy Theatre in New York City on May 12, 2026.

== Reception ==
Siddhant Adlakha of Variety praised A. Rimbaud's original approach to classical "Hollywood epics", describing it as a "black box Lawrence of Arabia". Writing for Reverse Shot, Jawni Han similarly raved about the film's originality, highlighting Wang's "fastidious mise-en-scène and prosodic undertaking."

In his review for Sight and Sound, Philip Concannon singles out Draper's performance as having "great confidence and linguistic dexterity" and complements the conceit of musical instruments representing the film's other characters. Peter Bradshaw of The Guardian also praises the "commitment" of Draper's performance, but criticises aspects of the narrative as being too opaque and "demanding".
