= Keaton Nigel Cooke =

American actor

- Occupations: Actor, singer
- Years active: 2012–present

Keaton Nigel Cooke is an American film actor, television actor, and singer. He made his television debut in Difficult People (2015) and his film debut in Wiener-Dog (2016).

== Career ==
Cooke started his acting career at five years old playing the lead role of Mowgli in the Jungle Book. After several more lead roles in stage productions, he was cast as Ryder Silverman in the TV series Difficult People (2015), followed by the role of Hudson in the TV series I Love You...But I Lied (2015). His first lead role in a movie came in Todd Solondz's dark satire Wiener: Dog, in which he played the young boy Remi (2016). Keaton was a lead actor again in Norman Lear: Just Another Version of You, where he played Norman Lear as a boy (2016). Both movies went to the Sundance Film Festival, where Keaton was the only lead actor with two movies. Alex and the Handyman was a black comedy in which Keaton played Alex (2017). The short won critical acclaim and Keaton was awarded best actor by New York University.

He played Abraham Lincoln's beloved son, Willie, a boy who died young and is visited by his bereaved father in the graveyard, in Lincoln in the Bardo (2017). Keaton played the lead character Simon in A Bread Factory Part One and its follow-up movie, A Bread Factory Part Two, which is the story of small town theater taking on big themes of social institutions and changing technologies in which Keaton plays the cameraman (2018). Adult Ed. is a TV comedy in which Keaton plays the wise-cracking son named Toby (2019). Keaton recently played the lead role Josh in a movie called La Bamba, which was in post-production in 2019.

== Filmography ==
=== Film ===
Year	Title	Role	Notes
2017	Alex and the Handyman	Alex	
2017	Lincoln in the Bardo	Willie Lincoln	Virtual Reality
2016	Norman Lear: Just Another Version Of You	Young Norman	Documentary
2016	Wiener-Dog	Remi	
2018	A Bread Factory Part One; A Bread Factory Part Two	Simon	Feature Film Series
2019	La Bamba	Josh	

=== Television ===
Year	Title	Role	Notes
2015	Difficult People	Ryder Silverman	Episode: "The Children's Menu"
2015	I Love You..But I Lied	Hudson	Episode: "Sick"
2019	Adult Ed	Toby	Netflix
