= The Grief of Others =

2015 film by Patrick Wang

- Directed by: Patrick Wang
- Screenplay by: Patrick Wang
- Based on: The Grief of Others by Leah Hager Cohen
- Produced by: Jim Cummings; Erich Lochner; Matt Miller; Patrick Wang; Benjamin Wiessner
- Starring: Wendy Moniz; Trevor St. John; Rachel Dratch; Chris Conroy; Sonya Harum; Mike Faist
- Cinematography: Frank Barrera
- Edited by: Elwaldo Baptiste
- Music by: Aaron Jordan
- Production companies: In the Family; Vanishing Angle
- Distributed by: Grasshopper Film
- Release date: March 15, 2015 (SXSW)
- Running time: 102 minutes
- Country: United States
- Language: English

The Grief of Others is a 2015 American tragedy film written and directed by Patrick Wang. It is based on the 2011 novel The Grief of Others by Leah Hager Cohen. The film stars Wendy Moniz, Trevor St. John, Rachel Dratch, Chris Conroy, Sonya Harum, and Mike Faist.

== Cast ==
- Wendy Moniz as Ricky Ryrie
- Trevor St. John as John Ryrie
- Rachel Dratch as Madeleine Berkowitz
- Chris Conroy as Lance Oprisu
- Jenna Cooperman as Fiona
- Mike Faist as Gordie Joiner
- Sonya Harum as Jessica Safransky
- Theo Iyer as Hugh Chaudhuri
- Oona Laurence as Biscuit Ryrie
- Henry Gagliardi as Young Paul Ryrie

== Release ==
The film premiered at South by Southwest on March 15, 2015.

== Awards & Nominations ==
Award	Year	Category	Recipient	Result	Ref.
SXSW Film Festival	2015	Narrative Feature	Patrick Wang	Nominated	

== Critical reception ==
On the review aggregator website Rotten Tomatoes, 92% of 12 critics' reviews are positive. Metacritic, which uses a weighted average, assigned the film a score of 78 out of 100, based on 8 critics, indicating "generally favorable" reviews.

On New York Times, Bilge Ebiri wrote that "It's an artful portrait of a world that refuses the order we try to impose on it when we close ourselves off to heartache, doubt and pain." On Variety, Justin Chang wrote the film is "a delicate, elliptically structured portrait of six wounded souls coping with the aftermath of tragedy."

On Los Angeles Times, Robert Abele said "Harder to miss, however, in every grainy 16mm shot and heartfelt performance is the movie's understated soul, as Wang guides us, sometimes awkwardly, usually touchingly, from isolation and secrets into understanding and connection."
