= Katie Joplin =

1999 American sitcom that aired on The WB

- Genre: Sitcom
- Created by: Tom Seeley; Norm Gunzenhauser
- Starring: Park Overall; Jesse Head; Jay Thomas; Ana Reeder; Jim Rash; Simon Rex
- Country of origin: United States
- Original language: English
- No. of seasons: 1
- No. of episodes: 7 (including 2 unaired)

Production
- Executive producers: Tom Seeley; Norm Gunzenhauser
- Production company: Warner Bros. Television

Original release
- Network: The WB
- Release: August 9 – September 6, 1999

Katie Joplin is an American sitcom created by Tom Seeley and Norm Gunzenhauser that aired for one season on The WB Television Network (The WB) from August to September 1999. Park Overall stars as the title character, a single mother who moves from Knoxville to Philadelphia and tries to balance her job as a radio program host with parenting her teenage son Greg (Jesse Head). Supporting characters include Katie's niece Liz Berlin (Ana Reeder) as well as her co-workers, played by Jay Thomas, Jim Rash, and Simon Rex. Majandra Delfino guest-starred in three episodes as the daughter of the radio station's general manager.

Warner Bros. Television produced the series, and its premise was developed from a pitch that Overall gave to The WB. The network initially optioned the show as a potential mid-season replacement for the 1998–1999 television season, but it was delayed for a year due to production issues. Production on Katie Joplin was halted in October 1998 because The WB and Warner Bros. Television were disappointed with its development.

Katie Joplin received the lowest ratings for any original program The WB aired in its time slot. Before the show's premiere, The WB already decided to cancel it, feeling it would not connect with a younger demographic. Only five episodes aired, although seven were filmed. Critics recommended Katie Joplin prior to its premiere, and the delay in its airing was a subject of discussion. Retrospective reviews of the series were negative and focused on its short run.

== Premise and characters ==
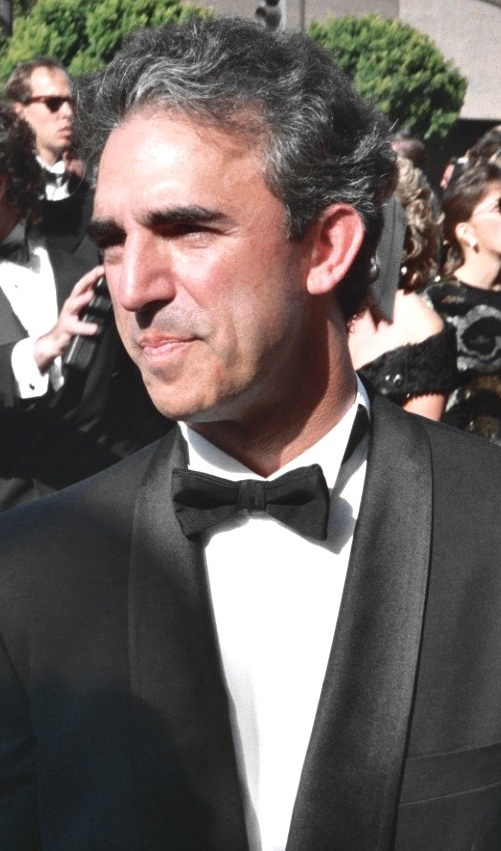
Jay Thomas (pictured in 1992) played general manager Glen Shotz.

The series follows Katie Joplin (Park Overall), a single mother to her 14-year-old son Greg (Jesse Head). While living in Knoxville, she is disappointed with her job in a bottling plant, where she works 16 hours a day. She moves to Philadelphia, to track down her estranged husband Jerry and find a new job. Katie's niece Liz Berlin (Ana Reeder) allows her and Greg to live in her loft on a temporary basis. Liz is an editor at a popular fashion magazine, and television historians Tim Brooks and Earle F. Marsh described her as a fashion plate. Katie first works for the Crescent Corset Company and later Car City, while her son attends Benjamin Franklin High School.

Katie makes a positive first impression with WLBP-FM's general manager Glen Shotz (Jay Thomas) while trying to sell him a car. Thomas approached his character from a sympathetic viewpoint; he explained: "I'm trying to make this guy more human than any general manager I've ever had." Brooks and Marsh wrote Katie impressed Glen with her "perception, Southern wit, and strong opinions". She received a job to host a phone-in radio program because of her "out-spoken nature". Episodes are often about Katie's attempt to balance her career and her relationship with her son. Head said that he shared several characteristics with Greg, explaining that they both come from small towns and enjoy "the music and baggy pants".

During her six-hour overnight show, entitled The Katie Joplin Show, Katie gives advice on love to her listeners. Program director Mitchell Tuit (Jim Rash) dislikes her as he opposes a talk show airing on his primarily rock and roll station. In an attempt to sabotage the program, he pairs her with the inexperienced producer Tiger French (Simon Rex). The Malay Mail's Marina Abdul Ghani wrote that Katie quickly becomes popular with listeners because she can get "right to the heart of the matter".

Glen has a teenage daughter, Sara Shotz (Majandra Delfino), out-of-wedlock and has not talked to her in years. During the show, he has a wife who recently gave birth to twins. Upon Katie's encouragement, Glen reconnects with Sara, and spoils her and hires her as a receptionist despite her incompetence. Sara treats Glen respectfully after he disciplines her, and she moves in with him. An episode focuses on Sara and Tiger secretly dating.

== Production and broadcast history ==
Tom Seeley and Norm Gunzenhauser created Katie Joplin and were its executive producers. Author Richard Irvin wrote that it was similar to the sitcom Murphy Brown, which was also produced by Seeley and Gunzenhauser. Katie Joplin's premise was developed in 1998 and based on a pitch that Overall made to The WB during a presentation. She said the series "brings the mountain spirit and mountain wisdom to the city of brotherly love", and described its tone as "very upbeat (and) very odd". Warner Bros. Television produced the series, which was filmed in front of a studio audience.

The WB Television Network (The WB) had originally optioned Katie Joplin as a mid-season replacement for the 1998–1999 television season. The network had considered it along with Zoe, Duncan, Jack and Jane, Baby Blues, and Movie Stars for its Sunday line-up. It was delayed to 1999 due to unspecified production issues. The WB and Warner Bros. Television were disappointed with the series, and stopped production in October 1998. Katie Joplin was developed under four working titles: You're With Kate, You're on With Kate, Untitled Park Overall Project, and Citizen Kate.

Katie Joplin premiered on August 9, 1999, and the final episode aired on September 6, 1999. Seven episodes were filmed, although only five aired. The series carried a TV-PG rating for suggestive dialogue and coarse or crude language. Broadcast on Monday nights at 9:30 pm EST, each episode lasts 30 minutes with commercials. Katie Joplin received the lowest ratings for any original WB program that aired in the time slot. When discussing these low ratings, The Washington Post columnist Lisa de Moraes wrote: "Maybe they should've let a couple of people know they were running it." In 2016, Irvin listed Katie Joplin in his book Forgotten Laughs: An Episode Guide to 150 TV Sitcoms You Probably Never Saw.

Overall learned The WB canceled Katie Joplin while promoting the sitcom Ladies Man; she said: "I think that's pretty rude. Honey, they didn't even call me to tell me they were canceling it!" According to Overall, The WB decided to cancel the series months before it aired as they did not believe it could attract a young demographic. Rob Owen, while writing for the Pittsburgh Post-Gazette, said Katie Joplin was scheduled for a "short run", and Times Leader's Norma Cavazos described it as a "summer series". de Moraes considered it an example of burning off, a practice in which a television network airs an already-canceled show as filler.

== Episodes ==
No.	Title	Directed by	Written by	Original release date	US viewers (millions)	Rating/share (households) (Note: "Rating" represents the percentage of American households with a television watching an episode during any given minute of its broadcast while "share" represents the percentage of American households with a television in use watching an episode during any given minute of its broadcast.)
1	"I'd Rather Be in Philadelphia"	Steve Zuckerman	Norm Gunzenhauser and Tom Seeley	August 9, 1999	2.1	1.6/3
After following her husband to Philadelphia, Katie Joplin receives a job as a radio show host after impressing the station's general manager Glen Shotz. The station's program director Mitchell Tuit attempts to sabotage Katie by having her work with the inexperienced producer Tiger French. Katie abandons her plan to reunite with her husband after realizing he will continue to be unfaithful to her.
2	"Charcoaled Gray"	Steve Zuckerman	Amy and Wendy Engelberg	August 16, 1999	1.87	1.5/2
Katie's son Greg gets detention after refusing a burnt sandwich from the cafeteria. When Katie shares his story on her radio show, Greg is bullied by two students. Meanwhile, Tiger helps Katie steal Mitchell's leather office chair.
3	"Promotion Commotion"	Steve Zuckerman	Bill Kunstler	August 23, 1999	1.49	1.1/2
Katie's radio show receives a city-wide promotional campaign. While Katie is distracted with work, Greg faces peer pressure from his new friend and gets caught breaking an abandoned building's windows. Because of this, Katie asks Glen to cut back on her busy campaign schedule. At the station, Tiger is uncomfortable with romantic advances from Glen's 16-year-old daughter Sara. (Note: Sara was supposed to be introduced in the show's fourth episode "Parent Trap". However, "Promotion Commotion" aired first, even though it was produced as the season's fifth episode.)
4	"Parent Trap"	Howard Murray	Marc Flanagan	August 30, 1999	2.15	1.7/3
Glen spoils Sara with presents and a job at the radio station, and Katie is angry when he refuses to discipline her. After getting Katie's advice, Glenn talks to Sara, and she decides to live with him. Meanwhile, Katie has trouble with her finances after her husband uses their joint credit cards for a shopping spree.
5	"Kill the Messenger"	Howard Murray	Michael Bornhorst	September 6, 1999	1.78	1.3/2
Katie discovers Tiger has been secretly dating Sara and encourages him to tell Glen. However, Tiger decides to break up with Sara instead, but Glen still finds out about their relationship. They later discover Sara has begun dating an intern from the station's mailroom. While preparing for a Bar Mitzvah, Greg turns to Katie's niece Liz Berlin for advice.
6	"We're Not in Tennessee Anymore, Toto"	James Hampton	Marc Flanagan	Unaired	—	—
Katie wants to spend more time with Greg, but worries about him after seeing his response to Liz's relationship with a male model. Liz becomes angry with Katie, who interrupts one of her business meetings, and Greg attempts to help the two reconcile. Meanwhile, Katie starts receiving her things from Tennessee and Greg is worried about seeing his father again. (Note: "We're Not in Tennessee Anymore, Toto" was the third episode produced for the series.)
7	"Tiger's Choice"	Joe Regalbuto	Ed Driscoll	Unaired	—	—
Tiger feels under-appreciated at his job, and asks for a better salary and more respect. Katie is uncomfortable with Glen's growing friendship with Greg.

== Critical reception ==
Prior to its debut, Katie Joplin was recommended by critics from TV Guide, The News Journal, The Arizona Republic, and the South Florida Sun-Sentinel. Rob Owen believed the series would appeal to fans of Overall who was well-known for her role on the sitcom Empty Nest.

Some reviewers commented on the delay with the show's airing. David Bianculli, while writing for Fort Worth Star-Telegram, said both Katie Joplin and the CBS sitcom Thanks were not "deemed worthy of consideration for their respective networks' fall schedules". A Dayton Daily News reviewer questioned The WB's decision, and wondered "perhaps they want us to decide for ourselves just why that might be". The writer highlighted Thomas's casting as the main reason for their "curiosity about what might have gone wrong here".

Retrospective reviews of the series were negative. In 2000, Mediaweek's Marc Berman discussed how since the early 1990s, television networks became increasingly interested in summer programming. Berman identified Northern Exposure and Melrose Place as successful instances of shows premiering in the summer, and criticized Katie Joplin as a failure because of its short run. The same year, journalist Josh Chetwynd cited it in USA Today while doing an overview of The WB and UPN on the fifth anniversary of their launches. He singled out Katie Joplin as one of The WB's "big bombs" based on its quick cancelation. In a 2011 Radio World article, Stephen Winzenburg discussed it as a part of his larger question about why television shows about radio have limited success and longevity. He criticized the show's premise, believing it was unrealistic for a middle-aged woman to be hired as a radio host without any prior experience. Winzenburg also considered the featured radio station (87.5 FM) to be an unlikely dial position.
