= The Theater Offensive =

LGBT+ theatrical organization in Boston

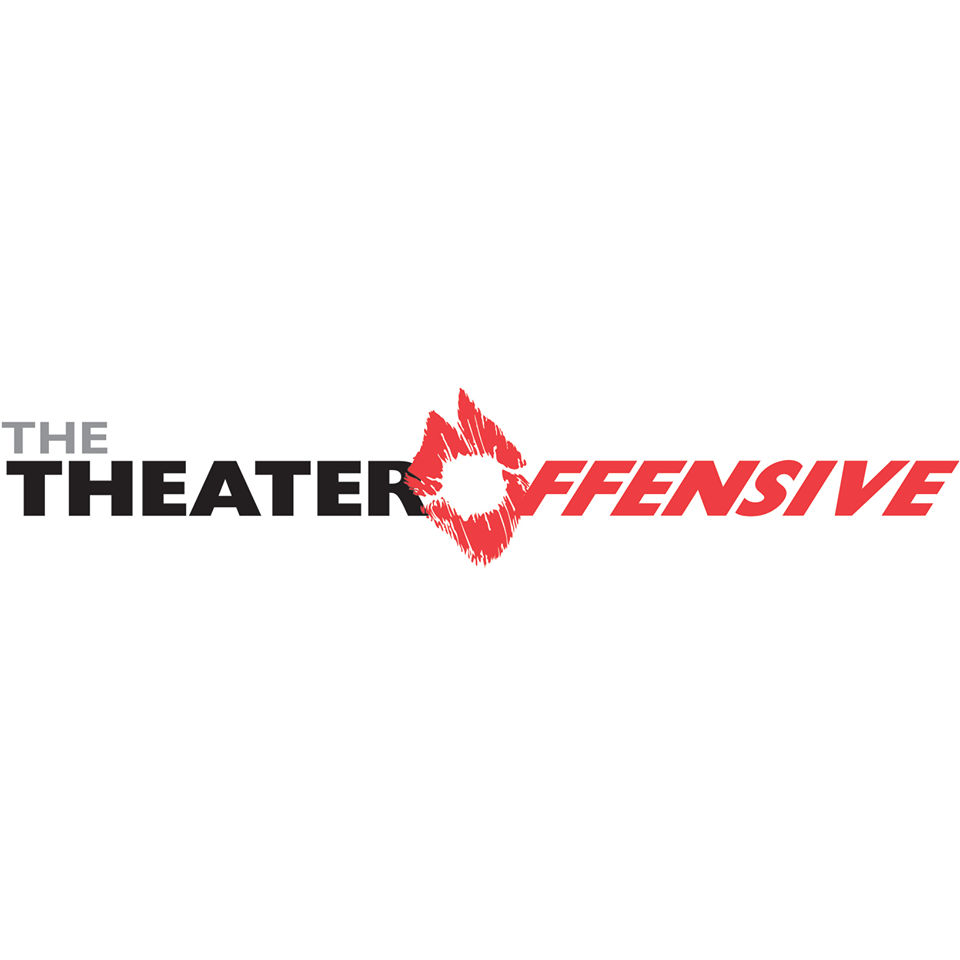
The Theater Offensive Logo

The Theater Offensive is a Boston-based theatrical organization dedicated to the production of queer works. The Theater Offensive was founded in 1989 by Abraham Rybeck "to present the diversity of lesbian, gay, bisexual, and transgender lives in art so bold it breaks through personal isolation, challenges the status quo, and builds thriving communities." The Theater Offensive mounts and produces festivals and individual productions by national and local queer performers, and also serves as a development environment for new theatrical work. In addition, The Theater Offensive works to build community through education, outreach, and political activism.

The Theater Offensive has expanded throughout its history. The True Colors OUT Youth Theater troupe concentrates on producing dramatical works produced by young, queer artists. Up until the summer of 2008, its "A Street Theater Named Desire", a guerrilla AIDS activist theater troupe, enters gay cruising grounds and presents performances that promote safe sex and AIDS education.

The Theater Offensive produces an annual Out on the Edge Festival of Queer Theater, which showcases new performing arts works by queer artists from around the world. It has been held each fall since its inception in 1992.

True Colors: Out Youth Theater, a program of The Theater Offensive and the country’s largest and longest-running lesbian, gay, bisexual, transgender and queer (LGBTQ) youth theater program, received the 2016 National Arts and Humanities Youth Program Award from First Lady Michelle Obama, for its effectiveness in promoting learning and life skills in young people through the arts by engaging them in creative youth development programming. The National Arts and Humanities Youth Program Award is the nation’s highest honor for youth arts programs, and True Colors, which was established in 1994, is the first LGBTQ organization in history to receive this award.

In early 2024, Giselle Byrd was announced as the new executive director of The Theater Offensive, making her the first Black trans woman to lead a regional theatre company in the United States.

== Awards and honors ==
- The National Arts and Humanities Youth Program Award, 2016
- Bisexual and Transgender Youth (BAGLY), 2010
- Outstanding Youth Group, Hyde Square Task Force, 2010
- Valued Ally Award: Somos Latinas LGBT Coalition of Mass., 2010
- 2008 Social Innovator Through the Arts from Social Innovation Forum
- 2007 Jonathan Larson Musical Theatre Award for Surviving the Nian
- IN Newsweekly "Artist of the Year" 2006
- Improper Bostonian "Best Fringe Theater"
- Massachusetts Cultural Council Gold Star
- Gay Fathers of Greater Boston Youth Service Award, 2001
- MIT Theater Arts Playwright in Residence and Visiting Lecturer 2001-2002
- Fett Community Service Award, 2000
- Nick Norton Boston Theater Award - Special Citation, 1999
- Boston Women's Fund Take a Stand Award, 1999
- AIDS Action Committee Unsung Heroes Award, 1999
- Greater Boston Business Council Award for Individual Excellence, 1999
- City of Cambridge Peace & Justice Award, 1997
- City of Cambridge Lavender Alliance Award, 1997
- Boston Center for the Arts, Artist in Residence 1993–present
- Bessie Smith Creative Leadership Award, Boston Lesbian & Gay Political Alliance, 1989

== See also ==
- The Year We Thought About Love, a 2015 documentary film about True Colors: Out Youth Theater
