= Surviving the Nian =

Surviving the Nian is an American musical written by Melissa Li (music, lyrics and book) and Abe Rybeck (book). The world premier on April 14, 2007 was directed by Patrick Wang, staged at the Boston Center for the Arts, and produced by The Theater Offensive.

The story of the play involves Kaylin, a Hong Kong native, returning home for a two-week vacation after having spent five years in the US. She is travelling with her lover, Asha, but her family knows neither that the two are lesbians nor that Asha is African American. The "nian" of the title refers to a mystical beast and also to the Chinese New Year festival in which they will be participating.

Li began writing the musical when she was just 19 and worked on it for four years before its premier. She had met Rybeck when she was 17 and participating in The Theatre Offensive's True Colors Out Youth Theater Troupe. The musical was developed through the Plays at Work play development program of The Theater Offensive.

== Awards ==
- 2007 Jonathan Larson Musical Theatre Award

== Bibliography ==
- Melloy, Kilian. "Melissa Li on Surviving the Nian", Edge, April 3, 2007
- "Queer Musical Surviving the Nian", Advocate, April 16, 2007
- "The Story Behind Surviving the Nian" The Theatre Offensive,
- Weisstuch, Liza. "Close Quarters", "Boston Phoenix" April 24, 2007
