= Battery Park (TV series) =

- Genre: Comedy
- Created by: Gary David Goldberg; Chris Henchy
- Starring: Elizabeth Perkins; Justin Louis; Jacqueline Obradors; Jay Paulson; Bokeem Woodbine; Frank Grillo
- Composer: Danny Pelfrey
- Country of origin: United States
- Original language: English
- No. of seasons: 1
- No. of episodes: 7 (3 unaired)

Production
- Executive producer: Gary David Goldberg
- Camera setup: Multi-camera
- Running time: 30 minutes
- Production companies: Ubu Productions; DreamWorks Television

Original release
- Network: NBC
- Release: March 23 – April 13, 2000

Battery Park is an American sitcom television series starring Elizabeth Perkins and Justin Louis. The series was produced by Ubu Productions and DreamWorks Television and aired from March 23 to April 13, 2000, at 9:30 p.m Eastern time on NBC. The show was cancelled after four episodes. The series was about a police department in Battery Park, Manhattan, New York City.

== Cast ==
- Elizabeth Perkins as Captain Madeleine Dunleavy
- Justin Louis as Lieutenant Ben Nolan
- Jacqueline Obradors as Detective Elena Vera
- Frank Grillo as Detective Antony "Stig" Stigliano
- Bokeem Woodbine as Detective Derek Finley
- Robert Mailhouse as Detective Kevin Strain
- Jay Paulson as Detective Carl Zernial
- Wendy Moniz as Maria DiCenzo
- Sam Lloyd as Ray Giddeon

== Production ==
The series was loosely based on Sugar Hill, an unaired ABC pilot produced in 1999.

== Episodes ==
Seven episodes are registered with the United States Copyright Office.

No.	Title	Directed by	Written by	Original release date	Prod. code	Viewers (millions)
1	"Pilot"	Andy Cadiff	Gary David Goldberg & Chris Henchy	March 23, 2000	100	14.70
2	"Rabbit Punch"	Arlene Sanford	Unknown	March 30, 2000	104	9.60
3	"How Do You Solve a Problem Like Maria?"	Lee Shallat-Chemel	Unknown	April 6, 2000	101	11.60
4	"You Give Law a Bad Name"	Arlene Sanford	Unknown	April 13, 2000	103	10.77
5	"Fast Times at Union High"	Lee Shallat-Chemel	N/A	Unaired	102	N/A
6	"Black Monday"	Arlene Sanford	N/A	Unaired	105	N/A
7	"Walter's Rib"	Arlene Sanford	N/A	Unaired	106	N/A

== Reception ==
Henry Winkler had received an Emmy nomination for 'Outstanding Guest Actor in a Comedy' for his appearance in the episode Walter's Rib, but after newspaper reporter Alan Sepinwall pointed out that the episode had been postponed to June from an earlier scheduled airdate and therefore missed the Emmy's May 31 deadline, the nomination was withdrawn.
