= A Bread Factory =

2018 two-part film by Patrick Wang

A Bread Factory, Part One: For the Sake of Gold
- Film poster
- Directed by: Patrick Wang
- Screenplay by: Patrick Wang
- Produced by: Daryl Freimark; Matt Miller; Patrick Wang
- Starring: Tyne Daly; Elisabeth Henry; James Marsters; Nana Visitor; Brian Murray; Glynnis O'Connor; Janeane Garofalo
- Cinematography: Frank Barrera
- Edited by: Elwaldo Baptiste
- Music by: Aaron Jordan; Melissa Li; Chip Taylor
- Production companies: Vanishing Angle; In The Family
- Distributed by: Grasshopper Film
- Release date: October 26, 2018 (United States)
- Running time: 122 minutes
- Country: United States
- Language: English
- Box office: US$17,325 (with part 2)

A Bread Factory, Part Two: Walk with Me a While
- Film poster
- Directed by: Patrick Wang
- Screenplay by: Patrick Wang
- Produced by: Daryl Freimark; Matt Miller; Patrick Wang
- Starring: Tyne Daly; Elisabeth Henry; James Marsters; Nana Visitor; Brian Murray; Zachary Sayle; Jessica Pimentel
- Cinematography: Frank Barrera
- Edited by: Elwaldo Baptiste
- Music by: Aaron Jordan; Melissa Li; Chip Taylor; Aaron Wagner; Patrick Wang
- Production companies: Vanishing Angle; In The Family
- Distributed by: Grasshopper Film
- Release date: October 26, 2018 (United States)
- Running time: 120 minutes
- Country: United States
- Language: English
- Box office: US$17,325 (with part 1)

A Bread Factory is a 2018 American two-part indie comedy drama film written and directed by Patrick Wang. It features an ensemble cast and depicts a fictional community arts center in a small upstate New York town that struggles under economic and social pressures. It received critical acclaim. The second part was Brian Murray‘s final role prior to his death.

== Plot ==
The film takes place in the fictional upstate New York town of Checkford. It centers on The Bread Factory, a community arts center run by a married couple, Dorothea and Greta, as well as daily life in the surrounding town.

In the first part, a conceptual art duo, May Ray, arrive in town and begin staging flashy, highly produced but utterly vapid performances. They threaten to siphon away an arts grant on which The Bread Factory depends. Dorothea and Greta work to convince the town council not to reassign the funds.

The second part centers around a performance of Euripides' tragedy Hecuba at The Bread Factory.

== Cast ==
- Tyne Daly as Dorothea
- Elisabeth Henry as Greta
- James Marsters as Jason
- Nana Visitor as Elsa
- Keaton Nigel Cooke as Simon
- Glynnis O'Connor as Jan
- Zachary Sayle as Max
- Janet Hsieh as May
- George Young as Ray
- Brian Murray as Sir Walter
- Nan-Lyn Nelson as Mavis
- Janeane Garofalo as Jordan
- Jessica Pimentel as Teresa
- Jane Gennaro as Ann

== Production ==
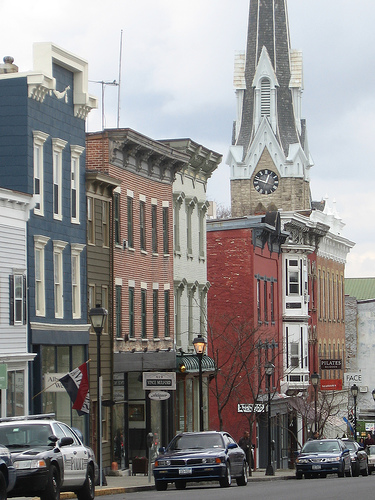
Downtown Hudson, New York, where the film was shot

The film was inspired by Time & Space Limited, a local arts center in Hudson, New York. It was filmed in Hudson over 24 days, following 10 days of rehearsals.

== Themes and interpretations ==
Critics identified the central themes of the film as the value and impact of the arts, and the difficulty of producing and promoting meaningful artistic work in a market economy.

== Release ==
The film was released in the United States on October 26, 2018.

== Reception ==
The film received universal critical acclaim. On review aggregator website Rotten Tomatoes, both parts have an approval rating of 100%, based on 30 and 22 reviews respectively. The critic consensus for the first part states "Epic yet intimate, A Bread Factory, Part One: For the Sake of Gold delivers the sprawling storytelling and nourishing drama audiences might expect from its imposing title." On review aggregator Metacritic, the film has a weighted average score of 91 based on 9 reviews, indicating "universal acclaim".

Justin Chang, writing for the Los Angeles Times, called the film a "warm and prickly humanist triumph" that "feels meticulously handcrafted in every respect".

Bilge Ebiri, writing for The New York Times, designated the film a critic pick, noting that it has "a deliberate pace and thematic ambition to spare — but it also has a ground-level, plain-spoken modesty that renders it hypnotic."

Matt Zoller Seitz of RogerEbert.com gave the film four out of four stars, calling it "a wildly ambitious yet self-effacing epic about a place and its people".

Richard Brody, writing for The New Yorker, described the film as a "comprehensive vision" drawn from Wang's "ferociously dedicated, deeply empathetic, finely conceived sense of purpose", offering "a detailed, expansive view of local politics and, for that matter, of the nature of community".
