= Matt Zoller Seitz =

American writer and critic (born 1968)

- Born: Matthew Emil Seitz; December 26, 1968 (age 57); Dallas, Texas, U.S.
- Education: Southern Methodist University
- Occupations: Critic; author; filmmaker
- Political party: Democratic
- Spouses: Jennifer Dawson (m. 1994; died 2006) Nancy Dawson (m. 2017; died 2020)
- Children: 2

Matt Zoller Seitz (born December 26, 1968) is an American film and television critic as well as an author and filmmaker.

== Career ==
Matt Zoller Seitz is editor-at-large at RogerEbert.com, a television critic for New York magazine and the website Vulture, in addition to being a member of the Peabody Awards board of jurors. He was previously a television critic at Salon.com and The Newark Star Ledger, and also a film critic for The New York Times. Prior to that he was a media columnist for the Dallas Observer. He founded The House Next Door, a film and media criticism blog. He is known as a leader in the creation of video essays, frequently featured on Moving Image Source and The L Magazine, and served as the publisher of PressPlay, a site for video-based film and television criticism. He was a finalist for the 1994 Pulitzer Prize for Criticism.

Zoller Seitz's second book, The Wes Anderson Collection, was published by Abrams Books in 2013. In February 2015, The Wes Anderson Collection: The Grand Budapest Hotel was published by Abrams Books. The Wes Anderson Collection was praised for its design and layout, which was intended to suggest the look and feel of an Anderson film and suggest that the reader was being taken on a tour of the filmmaker's imagination. "This book is the future," wrote Michael Sicinski in Cinéaste.

Mad Men Carousel: The Complete Critical Companion written by Zoller Seitz and with illustrations by Max Dalton was published by Abrams Books in November 2015. Zoller Seitz's latest book, The Press Gang, co-written with Godfrey Cheshire and Armond White and published by Seven Stories Press in 2020, is a compilation of Zoller Seitz's long-form film criticism written in the alternative weekly New York Press, an alternative weekly, during the late 1990s and early 2000s.

=== Filmmaking ===
He wrote, directed, and edited the feature film Home (2005).

== Personal life ==
Zoller Seitz grew up primarily in Dallas and is the son of jazz pianist David Zoller (1941–2020). Zoller Seitz and Jennifer Dawson were married from 1994 until her death on April 27, 2006. They had two children, Hannah and James Seitz. He married his second wife, Nancy Dawson, who was his first wife's sister and the ex-wife of his step-father's son Richard, in February 2017. They divided their time between Bay Ridge, Brooklyn and Cincinnati. Nancy died of cancer on April 27, 2020. Zoller Seitz's father died in November 2020 and his mother in April 2021. Zoller Seitz wrote extensively about his personal experiences with grief and loss in a series of articles published on RogerEbert.com.

== Preferences ==
He participated in 2022 Sight & Sound Poll, a decennial poll and selected his 10 favorite films of all time for it: All That Jazz (1979), Close-Up (1990), Days of Heaven (1978), Sunrise: A Song of Two Humans (1927), 2001: A Space Odyssey (1968), Goodfellas (1990), American Dream (1990), Do the Right Thing (1989), Salesman (1969), and A Bread Factory (2018).

== Bibliography ==
- Brad Pitt (1996); (ISBN 978-0-6766-0074-2)
- The Wes Anderson Collection (2013); (ISBN 978-0-8109-9741-7)
- The Wes Anderson Collection: The Grand Budapest Hotel (2015); (ISBN 978-1-6131-2877-0)
- Mad Men Carousel: The Complete Critical Companion (2015); (ISBN 978-1-6131-2936-4)
- TV (The Book): Two Experts Pick the Greatest American Shows of All Time (2016); Matt Zoller Seitz and Alan Sepinwall; (ISBN 978-1-4555-8820-6)
- The Oliver Stone Experience (2016); (ISBN 978-1-4555-8819-0)
- Guillermo del Toro's The Devil's Backbone (2017); Matt Zoller Seitz and Simon Abrams; (ISBN 978-1-6838-3108-2)
- The Sopranos Sessions (2019); Matt Zoller Seitz and Alan Sepinwall
- The Deadwood Bible: A Lie Agreed Upon (2022)
