= Leah Hager Cohen =

American author

Leah Hager Cohen is an American author who writes both fiction and nonfiction.

Cohen's father was superintendent of the Lexington School for the Deaf in Queens, New York, and she became fluent in sign language there. She entered NYU at age 16, intending to study drama, but later transferred to Hampshire College to study literature, graduating in 1988. After working as a sign language interpreter for two years, she entered Columbia Journalism School, graduating in 1991. Her first book grew out of her masters thesis, in which she reported on deaf culture.

Cohen lives in Belmont, Massachusetts. She has three children.

== Bibliography ==
=== Fiction ===
- Heat Lightning (Avon, 1997)
- Heart, You Bully, You Punk (Viking, 2003)
- House Lights (W. W. Norton & Company, 2007)
- The Grief of Others (Riverhead, 2011)
- No Book but the World (Riverhead, 2014)
- Strangers and Cousins (Riverhead, 2019)
- To & Fro (Bellevue Literary Press, 2024)

=== Non-fiction ===
- Train Go Sorry: Inside a Deaf World (Houghton Mifflin, 1994)
- Glass, Paper, Beans: Revelations on the Nature and Value of Ordinary Things (Doubleday, 1997)
- The Stuff of Dreams: Behind the Curtain of an American Community Theater (Viking, 2001)
- Without Apology: Girls, Women, and the Desire to Fight (Random House, 2005, ISBN 978-1-4000-6157-0)
- I Don't Know: In Praise of Admitting Ignorance (Except When You Shouldn't) (Riverhead, 2013)
