= Patrick Wang =

American film director and writer (born 1976)

- Born: 1976 (age 49–50)
- Citizenship: USA
- Education: Massachusetts Institute of Technology
- Years active: 2001–present

Patrick Wang is an American writer, director, and actor. His first feature was the indie film In the Family, which was released in 2011. He later directed the two-part indie film A Bread Factory, in 2018.

== Early life and education ==
Wang is a second-generation Taiwanese American. He was raised in Sugar Land, Texas, a suburb of Houston. He graduated from the Massachusetts Institute of Technology with a degree in economics and a concentration in music and theater arts.

== Career ==
As an economist, Wang studied energy policy, game theory, and income inequality at the Federal Reserve Bank, the Harvard School of Public Health, and other organizations.

=== Film ===
His feature film directorial debut In The Family, which he wrote, directed, produced, and starred in, was nominated for a "Best First Feature" Independent Spirit Award, and received positive reviews from Roger Ebert, The New York Times, the Los Angeles Times, the Chicago Reader, Time Out Chicago, NOW Magazine, and was featured on several "Best of 2011" film lists. The film also won Best Narrative Feature awards at the San Diego Asian Film Festival, the Spokane International Film Festival, and the San Francisco International Asian American Film Festival, with Wang personally receiving awards at the festivals as well. For the film, Wang also was named by Filmmaker Magazine as one of the "25 New Faces of Independent Film".

His second feature film that he wrote and directed is entitled The Grief of Others (2015), based on the 2011 novel of the same name by Leah Hager Cohen. The film premiered at the 2015 South by Southwest Film Festival, and was released theatrically throughout France in August 2015 by ED Distribution under the title, Les Secrets des Autres.

His third feature, which was released in two parts, was A Bread Factory (2018), about a community arts center in the fictional town of Checkford, New York. In connection with a retrospective of Wang's films in the United Kingdom and Ireland, Phil Hoad in the Guardian wrote that "Wang’s films, seen together, showcase a civically minded vision that demands attention."

Wang has previously acted in, written, and produced short films such as Little Mary and Surveillances, and also acted in short films including Rushing River, Inherent Darkness and Enlightenment, and the 2005 feature film Headspace.

=== Theater ===
As a theater director, Wang has also specialized in the direction of classical verse drama. He directed the world premiere of Dianne Arnson Svarlien's translation of Medea.

He has also directed musicals, including Surviving the Nian. Wang has taught and directed productions at the Stella Adler Studio and the Neighborhood Playhouse.

He has authored a book of 75 original short monologue plays entitled The Monologue Plays.

== Filmography ==
Year	Title	Director	Writer	Producer	Note
2011	In the Family	Yes	Yes	Yes	
2015	The Grief of Others	Yes	Yes	Yes	
2018	A Bread Factory, Part One: For the Sake of Gold	Yes	Yes	Yes	
2018	A Bread Factory, Part Two: Walk with Me a While	Yes	Yes	Yes	Also composer
2026	A. Rimbaud	Yes	Yes	Yes	

=== Acting credits ===
Year	Title	Role	Notes
2002	Inherent Darkness and Enlightenment	Businessman	Short film
2003	Surveillances	Mr. Li	Short film
2005	Headspace	Sammy	
2006	Little Mary	Little Mary	Short film
2006	Rushing River	Eric	Short film
2011	In the Family	Joey Williams	
2023	Evil Sublet	Oliver	
2024	A Different Man	Director	

=== Other credits ===
Year	Title	Role	Notes
2003	Surveillances	Executive producer	Short film
2006	Little Mary	Writer and executive producer	Short film
2014	The Thinking Molecules of Titan	Writer	Short film
