= Gotham Screen Film Festival & Screenplay Contest =

- Location: Manhattan, New York
- Awards: Circleframe Screenwriting Award
- Website: http://www.gothamscreen.com

GOTHAM SCREEN is an American cinematic event which became the newest addition to New York City's film festival scene.

After its debut in 2007 as a screenplay contest, Gotham Screen, or GSIFF International Film Festival, has been expanded to showcase shorts and feature films. 2012's festival took place in downtown Manhattan, at the Quad Cinema, from October 4–14.

This festival gives filmmakers the chance to have their work shown and critically judged in New York. Gotham Screen specializes in fresh voices and perspectives from local, national and international filmmakers. The mission of the festival is to create a positive industry and audience exposure for works that would otherwise not easily get seen. The concurrently held screenplay contest also holds regular readings throughout the year.

The festival's International Showcase will this year host a selection of European, Middle Eastern and Asian feature films, shorts and documentaries, while the New American Cinema section brings the latest in US shorts and independents.

== About the festival ==
The GOTHAM SCREEN film festival showcases new feature, documentary and short films from independent, first- or second-time directors as well as international releases making their East Coast or US debut. The festival focuses on new names and lesser known filmmaking regions. There is a $1,000 cash prize for Best Short Film.

The GOTHAM SCREEN Screenplay Contest is aimed at first and second time screenwriters and comes with a $2,500 cash prize for the winning screenplay. In addition, excerpts from selected contest entries will be performed live at a staged reading during the festival.

The 2012 Festival and Screenplay Contest was held in Manhattan from October 4–14, 2012, at the Quad Cinema, Tribeca Grand and other venues in downtown Manhattan.

== 2011 Festival ==
Friday, October 14, 7:00 pm, Quad Cinema	Opening Night Premiere: "Occupant (film)", US 2011, 86 min. WORLD PREMIERE Dir. Henry S. Miller, written by John Brett, with Van Hansis, Cody Horn, Thorsten Kaye, Steve Routman, Amy Wilson
Friday, October 14, 1:00 pm, Quad Cinema	Fat Cows, Lean Cows, Documentary, Israel, 2011, 85 min. NEW YORK PREMIERE Dir. Meni Elias
Saturday, October 15, 3:00 pm, Quad Cinema	"The Cost of Creativity", US 2011, 55min. WORLD PREMIERE Dir. Jon Biddle
Saturday, October 15, 7:00 pm, Quad Cinema	"Sandcastle", US 2011, 96min. EAST COAST PREMIERE Dir. Boo Junfeng, with Joshua Tan, Elena Chia
Sunday, October 16, 1:00 pm, Quad Cinema	"L'Éspirit Du Vin", US 2011, 92 min. NEW YORK CITY PREMIERE Dir. Olympe Minvielle
Monday, October 17, 7:15 pm, Quad Cinema	"Jo For Jonathan", US 2011, 85 min. EAST COAST PREMIERE Dir. Maxime Giroux, with Raphaël Lacaille, Jean-Sébastien Courchesne
Monday, October 17, 9:15 pm, Ten Days	"Ten Days", US 2011, 76 min. WORLD PREMIERE Dir. Daniel Gonzales

== 2010 Festival ==
The 2010 Festival and Screenplay Contest was held in Manhattan from October 7–17, 2010, at the Tribeca Cinemas, Tribeca Grand and other venues in downtown Manhattan.

== 2010 Awards Winners ==
2010 GOTHAM SCREEN Circleframe Awards announced

The winning films and screenplays were announced at the industry brunch on the closing day of the 2010 Gotham Screen Film Festival, Sunday, Oct 17, 2010:

Best Feature	Just Between Us; Rajko Grlić, director
Best Photography	Meat; Viktor Nieuwenhuijs, Cinematographer/DP
Best Actress	Maxine Peake, The Secret Diaries of Miss Anne Lister
Best Actor	Miki Manojlović, Just Between Us
Best Short Film	Tapeworm; Margaret Laney, director
Special Jury Mention - Acting in A Short Film	Tapeworm; Madeleine Lodge, actress
Special Jury Mention - Student Film	The Birds Upstairs; Christopher Jarvis, director
Special Jury Mention - Short Film Experiment	Somewhere Never Traveled; Ben Garchar, director

2010 GOTHAM SCREEN Circleframe Screenwriting Awards

Best Screenplay	Black Parables by Andrew Williams Flores - Winner of the $2,500 Circleframe Screenwriting Award, sponsored by Triboro Pictures.
Best Thriller	Freedom at Midnight by Jeffrey Ryback
Best Horror	The Life & Crimes of Dudley Segal by Barry Kneller
Best Young Adult/Family	Strike by Lucinda Ziesing
Best Adventure	The Revenge of the Black Claw by Dylan Paschke
Best Drama	Relay by Louise Bylicki
Best Comedy	The Liquidator by Ed Waugh & Trevor Wood

== Festival lineup 2010 ==
The 2010 festival lineup:

Thursday, October 7, 7:30 pm, Tribeca Cinemas	Opening Night Premiere: Radio Free Albemuth, US 2010, 100 min. WORLD PREMIERE (of final film version); Dir. John Alan Simon, written by Philip K. Dick, with Jonathan Scarfe (Raising the Bar), Shea Whigham (Fast & Furious), Katheryn Winnick (Killers), Alanis Morissette, Hanna Hall (The Virgin Suicides), Ashley Greene (Twilight)
Friday, October 8, 7:30 pm, Tribeca Cinemas	Meat, Netherlands, 2010, 85 min. US PREMIERE; Dir. Victor Nieuwenhuijs and Maartje Seygerth, with Nellie Benner, Hugo Metsers, Titus Muizelaar
9:30 pm, Tribeca Cinemas	LelleBelle, Netherlands, 2010, 85 min. US PREMIERE; Dir.: Mischa Kamp, with Anna Raadsveld, Benja Bruijing, Charlie Dagelet, Tom Van Landuyt
Saturday, October 9, 7:00 pm, Tribeca Cinemas	Shorts Selection I
9:00 pm, Tribeca Cinemas	The War is Over, Macedonia/Switzerland, 2009, 95 min. US PREMIERE; Dir. Mitko Panov, with Enver Petrovci, Blerta Syla, Ljupcho Todorovski, Armond Morina, Muzafer Etemi, Selman Lokaj, Dritero Ame, Sylejman Lokaj, Sheqerie Buqaj
Sunday, October 10, 6:30 pm, Tribeca Cinemas	A Shine of Rainbows, Ireland/Canada, 2009, 101 min. Dir. Vic Sarin, with Connie Nielsen (Gladiator, Rushmore), Aidan Quinn (Reckless, Desperately Seeking Susan), John Bell
8:30 pm, Tribeca Cinemas	The Secret Diaries of Miss Anne Lister, UK, 2010, 90 min. US PREMIERE; Dir. James Kent, with Maxine Peake, Anna Madeley, Susan Lynch, Christine Bottomley, Gemma Jones, Dean Lennox Kelly, Tina O'Brien
Monday, October 11, 6:30 pm	Staged Screenplay Reading of a winning entry of the Gotham Screen Screenplay Contest
Tuesday, October 12, 7:30 pm, Macao Trading Co.	Shorts Selection II
Wednesday, October 13, 7:30 pm, Tribeca Cinemas	She Wolf Rising, US, 2010, 89 min. WORLD PREMIERE; Dir. Marc Leland, with Tiffany Shepis (Dirty Little Trick), Debbie Rochon (Terror Talk, Psychosomatika), Timothy Mandala (As the World Turns, Guiding Light), Ruby Larocca (Contact, The Quiet Ones)
Wednesday, October 13, 9:30 pm, Tribeca Cinemas	Paprika (2006 film) - A tribute to Satoshi Kon, Japan, 2006, 90 min. Dir. Satoshi Kon (Anime)
Thursday, October 14, 8:30 pm	Film Socialisme, France/Switzerland, 2010, 101 min. Dir. Jean-Luc Godard, with Patti Smith, Élisabeth Vitali, Christian Sinniger, Nadège Beausson-Diagne, Alain Badiou, Lenny Kaye, Catherine Tanvier
Friday, October 15, 7:00 pm	Shorts Selection III
Friday, October 15, 9:00 pm	Southern District (Zona Sur), Bolivia, 2009, 108 min. Dir. Juan Carlos Valdivia, with Ninón del Castillo, Pascual Loayza, Nicolás Fernández, Juan Pablo Koria, Mariana Vargas, Viviana Condori
Saturday, October 16, 8:30 pm	Closing Night Premiere: Just Between Us, Croatia, 2010, 87 min. US PREMIERE; Dir. Rajko Grlić, with Miki Manojlović, Bojan, Ksenija Marinkovic, Daria Lorenci, Nataša Dorčić, Nina Ivanisin
Sunday, October 17, 11:30 am	Awards Brunch at The Loft

== Festival lineup 2009 ==
Gotham Screen at the Tribeca Cinemas in Manhattan

The 2009 Festival and Screenplay Contest was held in Manhattan from October 20–25, 2009.

The highlights of the 2008 lineup:

Opening Night Premiere: Loft (2008 film) Belgium 2008 - Thursday, October 21, 8:30pm A sexy Belgian thriller, starring Koen De Bouw, Filip Peeters, Matthias Schoenaerts, Veerle Baetens, Laura Verlinden and An Miller; Dir.: Erik Van Looy. U.S. Premiere.

Closing Night Premiere: The Understudy (2008 film) US 2008- Sunday, October 25, 7:30pm A cool New York comedy, starring Marin Ireland, Paul Sparks, Aasif Mandvi, Richard Kind, Tom Wopat, Gloria Reuben, Reiko Aylesworth; Dir: David Conolly & Hannah Davis. New York Premiere.

Special Screening: The Belgrade Phantom, Serbia 2008- Saturday, October 24, 9pm A “Fast and Furious’ for the Socialist era” at the end of the 70s, starring Milutin Milošević, Radoslav Milenković, Marko Živić, Nada Macankovic; Dir: Jovan Todorović. U.S. Premiere.

Live Staged Reading: Tuesday, October 20, 7:30pm A selection of excerpts from finalists for the Circleframe Award of the Gotham Screen screenplay contest are performed live on stage. Free Event.

== 2009 Awards Winners ==
2009 GOTHAM SCREEN Circleframe Awards announced

The winning films and screenplays were announced on the closing day of the 2009 Gotham Screen Film Festival, Sunday, Oct 25, 2009:

Best Feature	Salawati; Marc X Grigoroff, director
Best Documentary	The Belgrade Phantom; Jovan B. Todorovic, director
Best Photography	Loft (2008 film); Danny Elsen, Cinematographer/DP
Best Actress	Salina Safuan, Salawati
Best Actor	Eduard Fernández, El Vestido (The Dress)
Best Short Film	El Encargado (The One In Charge); Sergio Barrejón, director
Special Jury Mention	The Moon Inside You; Diana Fabianova, director

2009 GOTHAM SCREEN Circleframe Screenwriting Awards

Best Screenplay	Coal Hard Cash by Arthur Schurr - Winner of the $2,500 Circleframe Screenwriting Award, sponsored by Triboro Pictures.
Best Drama	The Congo Redemption by Ken Straw and Joey O'Connor
Best Comedy	Sink or Swim: The Saga of Shore Break Rentals by Keith Strausbaugh
Best Romantic Comedy	FRENCHING aka OOH LA-LA by Marie Rose
Best Family/Children's	Chances by Jeff Trently and Anthony Stitt
Best Action/Adventure	Graf by M. Roman Rosales & Peter Loffredo
Best Thriller	Cleo Parker by Michel Palmer

== Festival lineup 2008 ==
Opening Night Premiere
Left Bank Linkeroever Belgium 2008 - Thursday, October 30th, 7pm
starring Eline Kuppens, Matthias Schoenaerts, Marilou Mermans; Dir: Pieter Van Hees

Closing Night Premiere
Pretty Ugly People US 2008- Sunday, November 2nd, 7:30pm
starring Missi Pyle, Melissa McCarthy, Josh Hopkins, Octavia Spencer, Dir: Tate Taylor

Special Screening
How To Be UK 2008- Saturday, November 1st, 9pm
starring Robert Pattinson, Rebecca Pidgeon, Jeremy Hardy; Dir: Oliver Irving

== 2008 Awards Winners ==
2008 GOTHAM SCREEN Circleframe Awards announced

The winning films and screenplays were announced on the closing day of the 2008 Gotham Screen Film Festival, Sunday, Nov 2, 2008:

Audience Award	Pretty Ugly People; Tate Taylor, director
Best Feature	The Other Half (L'Autre Moitié); Rolando Colla, director
Best Documentary	Face Addict; Edo Bertoglio, director
Best Photography	Left Bank Linkeroever; Nicolas Karakatsanis, Cinematographer/DP
Best Actress	Eline Kuppens, Left Bank Linkeroever
Best Actor	Robert Pugh, Goodnight Irene
Best Short Film	Word On The Street; Nick Barbieri, director

2008 GOTHAM SCREEN Circleframe Screenwriting Awards

Best Screenplay	The Virgin Of Poughkeepsie; A romantic comedy, by Eva Konstatopoulos - Winner of the $2,500 Circleframe Screenwriting Award, sponsored by Triboro Pictures.
Best Comedy	The Method by Beth Overmyer
Best Drama	Lone Scout by Alan O'Connor
Best Adventure	The Legend of Jean Lafitte by C. Robert Holloway
Best Children's/Family	The Magical Kingdom of Naga as Envisioned by the Princess Lena by Tanya Klein
Best Horror	Buzz by Mark Cerulli
Best Thriller	American Gothic by Melissa Bruning
