= Occupant =

- Directed by: Henry S. Miller
- Written by: Jonathan Brett
- Produced by: Blair Rosenfeld; Susan Dickey; Michelle Kalsi
- Starring: Van Hansis; Cody Horn; Thorsten Kaye
- Release date: October 14, 2011
- Running time: 86 minutes
- Language: English

Occupant is a 2011 American thriller film featuring Van Hansis as Danny, a young New Yorker about to inherit an old apartment. It was written by Jonathan Brett and directed by Henry S. Miller and shot in New York City, USA. It also stars Cody Horn and Thorsten Kaye.

The film premiered on the opening night of the Gotham Screen Film Festival & Screenplay Contest on October 14, 2011, in New York City. On October 18, 2011, the film was released on-demand in many cable systems and on most digital platforms (i.e., iTunes, Amazon, Blockbuster, PlayStation) in the U.S. and Canada. A full list of providers, as well as trailers, interviews and other information can be viewed at the movie's website. The DVD was released in November 2011.

== Synopsis ==
Occupant is a psychological thriller about the value of patience and the importance of human contact.

The film opens as an old woman dies in her bed. The following day, her estranged grandson, Danny, comes to the rent-controlled apartment to ID the body, and the building's strange doorman encourages him to squat in the apartment until a lawyer can transfer the lease to Danny permanently.

Danny is instructed to not leave the apartment for 12 days by the lawyer and then by the doorman Joe. Joe becomes his only contact to the outside world and brings him groceries, since if Danny leaves the apartment himself, the landlord could lock him out. After about three or four days, he starts to change from the guy who had to be convinced to stay in the apartment to a guy who feels that the apartment was for him, and only him. As the days progress further, Danny begins to suffer from cabin fever, leading to delusions and hallucinations. At the same time, strange things begin to happen and other people who enter the apartment go missing.

By the ninth day, Danny's cabin fever has progressed to the extreme. Danny’s cat, Ziggy, goes missing, then Danny discovers a bloody claw and starts smashing through walls, thinking Ziggy is hidden in the crawl space. The doorbell buzzes and a neighbor tells him to keep down the racket. Then the power goes out.

On day 10, Danny requests razor wire and cutters from Joe. Danny explains to Joe that he thinks the landlord stole his cat and cut his power. He tries to turn on a light to prove that his power is out and the light comes on, which first confuses Danny and then it clicks for him that the landlord must be messing with his head. He then sets up the razor wire in his apartment as a series of booby traps. When he later calls for Joe, a new doorman shows up, claiming that Joe is sick and Danny must leave the apartment.

Danny, set off by the loss of his cat and the doorman he knows, begins making crude weapons from things around the house.

Day 11 opens with him on the couch surrounded with razor wire, holding a crude weapon made from a tennis racket. The power is off again. When the power comes back on, he starts smashing a chair, once again making too much noise. Another buzz of the doorbell brings the police, telling him to keep down the racket. The police officer also asks what the smell in the apartment is. Danny answers that it is dinner. Danny re-enters the apartment and opens a casserole in the oven to find his pet cat charred.

On day 12, he calls his lawyer and gets no answer. He then constructs another crude weapon of nails in a swinging door. He stands in front of the door and flashes back to some better times, then sees his dead grandmother’s face as she died and uses the swinging door weapon on himself. Later in the day, the doorbell buzzes and it’s his lawyer, telling him the court order came through and the apartment is finally his.

The movie ends with the son of the new tenants finding the video blog camera hidden in a piano. The child watches the SD card which reveals that Danny was a sleepwalker, who murdered every person and animal that entered the apartment.

== Cast ==
- Van Hansis as Danny Hill
- Cody Horn as Sharleen Hunt
- Thorsten Kaye as Joe
- Jamie Harrold as Harold

== Reception ==
HorrorNews described the film as "an interesting character study." In a positive review, New York Daily News said, "We like how director Henry Miller shoots the film. On screen, the building seems to hum. More than terrifying, the interiors and exterior, hallways and foyer, kitchens and closets, all seem to have depth, anger and emotion. It's like the building has tentacles sucking the tenant in."
