= Van Hansis =

American actor (born 1981)

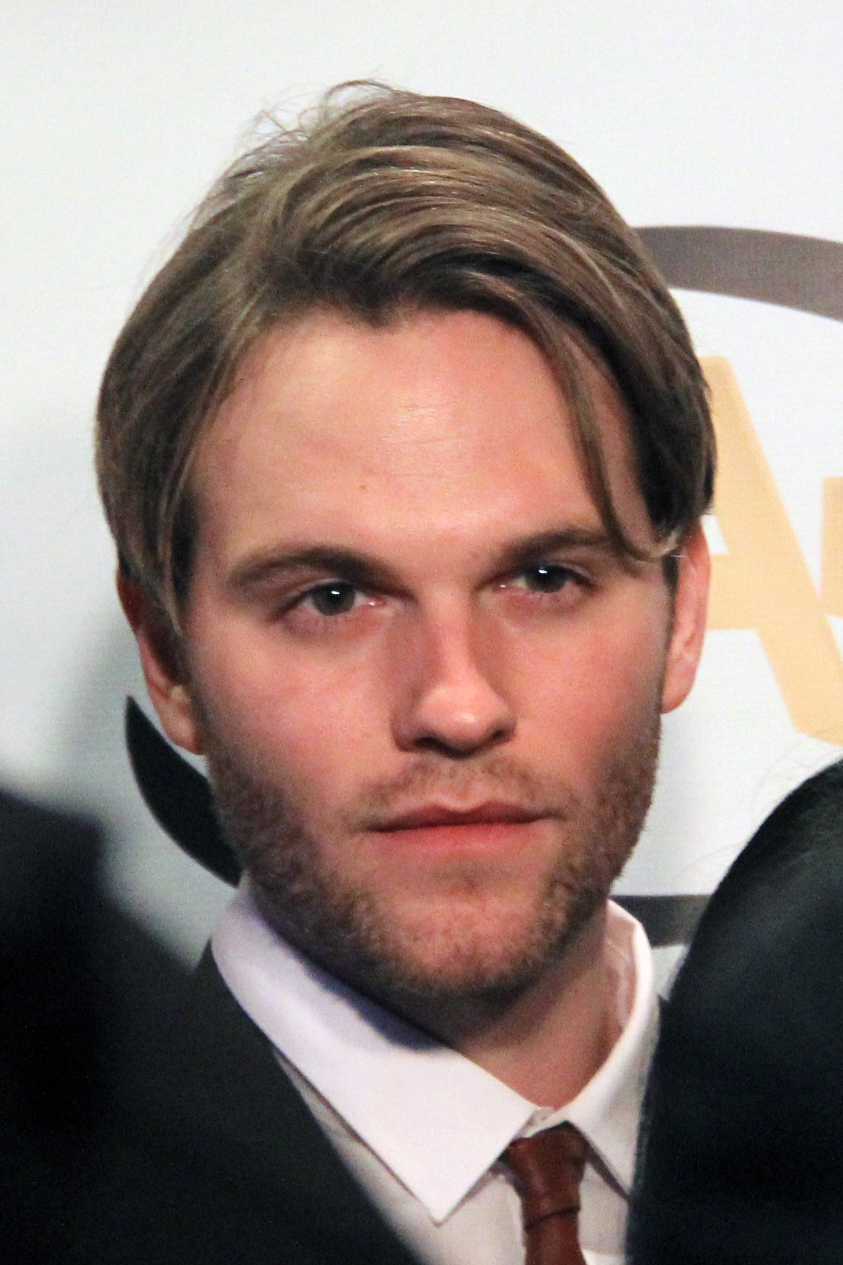
- Hansis on the Red Carpet of the 5th Indie Series Awards
- Born: Evan Vanfossen Hansis; September 25, 1981 (age 45); North Adams, Massachusetts, U.S.
- Education: Carnegie Mellon University (BFA)
- Occupation: Actor
- Years active: 2002–present
- Partner: Tyler Hanes (2007–present)

Evan Vanfossen Hansis (born September 25, 1981) is an American actor. Hansis portrayed the rich Luke Snyder on the CBS soap opera As the World Turns from December 14, 2005, until the show's final episode September 17, 2010. The son of long running characters on the series, Luke is known for a gay romantic storyline cited as one of the first in American daytime television.

Hansis has had guest roles on several television series and starred in the 2011 thriller film Occupant. In December 2012, he began playing the role of Thom in the dark comedy web series EastSiders. Hansis later played Jess Gibson in the 2013 horror film Devil May Call, and starred as Dusty in the 2015 film Kiss Me, Kill Me.

Hansis was nominated for a Daytime Emmy Award in 2007, 2008 and 2009 for his As the World Turns role, and was nominated again in 2016 for his role on EastSiders.

== Early life and education ==
Hansis was born in North Adams, Massachusetts, but moved to Greenfield in the third grade when his mother became a principal in the Gill-Montague Regional School District. He attended Four Corners School and later the Greenfield Center School. Hansis began acting in theater camp as a child. He attended high school at a boarding school called Walnut Hill School for the Arts in Natick, because, he says, he knew by then he wanted to be an actor "and it was a good school for that".

Hansis graduated from Carnegie Mellon University in 2004, receiving a Bachelor of Fine Arts in Acting from the School of Drama.

== Career ==
Hansis appeared in the play The Laramie Project in Pittsburgh in 2002, and later worked at the Williamstown Theatre Festival in Massachusetts in productions including On the Razzle and The Witching Hour in 2005.

=== As the World Turns ===
Hansis portrayed Luke Snyder on the CBS soap opera As the World Turns from December 14, 2005, until the show's final episode September 17, 2010. Luke, previously played by Jake Weary, is the son of one of the series' long running supercouples, Holden and Lily Snyder (played by Jon Hensley and Martha Byrne, later Noelle Beck). Shortly after Hansis took over the role, the character came out as gay on May 9, 2006. Luke subsequently became involved in a romance with another male character, a pairing eventually hailed as the first gay supercouple in American soap opera history. The August 17, 2007, kiss between Luke and Noah Mayer (played by Jake Silbermann) was the first ever gay male kiss on an American daytime drama. Hansis was nominated for a Daytime Emmy Award for portraying Luke in 2007, 2008 and 2009.

=== Other projects ===
From September 2007 to mid-January 2008, Hansis appeared off-Broadway as Lance Sussman in a production of Charles Busch's Die, Mommie, Die!.

In 2011, Hansis guest starred in the Psych episode "This Episode Sucks" as Adrian Viccellio, and the Nikita episode "Clawback" as Yuri Levrov. He next appeared in the 2012 The Mentalist episode "Red Is the New Black" as Derek.

In 2012, Hansis began starring as Thom in the dark comedy web series EastSiders, which explores the aftermath of infidelity on a gay couple in Silverlake, Los Angeles. He has been nominated for two Indie Series Awards for the role, in 2014 and 2016, as well as a 2016 Daytime Emmy nomination.

Hansis starred as Danny Hill in the thriller film Occupant, which premiered on the opening night of the Gotham Screen Film Festival & Screenplay Contest in New York City on October 14, 2011. He next appeared as Jess Gibson in the 2013 horror film Devil May Call. In 2015, Hansis starred as Dusty in Kiss Me, Kill Me.

In September 2024, it was announced Hansis had been cast as Lucas Jones on General Hospital. He made his first episodic appearance on October 4 of the same year.

== Personal life ==
Hansis came out as gay in The Fight Magazine in May 2014, in an interview with his EastSiders costar and creator, Kit Williamson. He has been with his partner Tyler Hanes since 2007.

== Filmography ==
Year	Title	Role	Notes
2005–2010	As the World Turns	Luke Snyder	Series regular 440 episodes
2006	The Time Machine	Jesse	Video
2011	Occupant	Danny Hill	
2011	Psych	Adrian Viccellio	Season 6 Episode 3: "This Episode Sucks"
2011	Nikita	Yuri Levrov	Season 2 Episode 7: "Clawback"
2012	The Mentalist	Derek	Season 4 Episode 13: "Red Is the New Black"
2012–2019	Eastsiders	Thom	Series regular 29 episodes
2013	Wedding Day	Chris	Short
2013	Devil May Call	Jess Gibson	
2014	Eastsiders: The Movie	Thom	
2015	Kiss Me, Kill Me	Dusty Young	
2016	Upstate	James	Short
2017	Crick in the Holler	Buck Guthrie	Short
2017	First Reformed	Roger	
2017	The Deuce	Derek	Season 1 Episode 5: "What Kind of Bad?"
2018	Vacation Rental	Elliot	Short
2019	Osiris	Seth Fielding	Short
2020	FBI	Todd Conroy	Season 2 Episode 17: "Broken Promises"
2020	Murder Manual	Elliot	
2020	Ms. Guidance	Walker Pate	Series regular 5 episodes
2024	Lillith & Bert Go Nowhere		Season 1 Episode 2: "What Leaks Beneath"
2024	Lillith & Bert Go to Launch	Van	Season 2 Episode 4: "Ginette & Co."
2024–present	General Hospital	Dr. Lucas Jones	Series regular

=== Theater ===
- The Laramie Project, 2002 (Stephen Mead Johnson, Doc O'Connor) – Pittsburgh (dir. Jesse Berger)
- Polaroid Stories (Narcissus), 2004 – Williamstown Theatre Festival
- On the Razzle (Ragamuffin), 2005- Williamstown Theatre Festival (dir. David Jones)
- The Witching Hour (Dr. Scott/ Washington Otis), 2005 (dir. Amanda Charlton) - Williamstown Theatre Festival
- An Evening Honoring The Laramie Project, 2006 – New York (dir. Moisés Kaufman)
- Die, Mommie, Die! (Lance Sussman), 2007- New York (dir. Carl Andress)
- Johnny Applef?%ker, 2007 - New York (dir. Stephen Brackett)
- Dance Dance Revolution (Wiggles), 2008 - New York (dir. Alex Timbers)

== Awards and nominations ==
Hansis was nominated for a Daytime Emmy Award in 2007, 2008 and 2009 for portraying Luke on As the World Turns, and was nominated again in 2016 for his role as Thom on EastSiders. He has also been nominated for two Indie Series Awards for EastSiders, in 2014 and 2016.

Year	Nominated work	Category	Award	Result	Notes	Ref.
2007	As the World Turns	Outstanding Younger Actor in a Drama Series	34th Daytime Emmy Awards	Nominated		
2008	As the World Turns	Outstanding Younger Actor in a Drama Series	35th Daytime Emmy Awards	Nominated		
2009	As the World Turns	Outstanding Supporting Actor in a Drama Series	36th Daytime Emmy Awards	Nominated		
2014	EastSiders	Best Lead Actor – Drama	5th Indie Series Awards	Nominated		
2016	EastSiders	Outstanding Actor in a Digital Daytime Drama Series	43rd Daytime Creative Arts Emmy Awards	Nominated		
2016	EastSiders	Best Lead Actor – Drama	7th Indie Series Awards	Nominated		
