= Demonic (2015 film) =

2015 film directed by Will Canon

- Official release poster
- Directed by: Will Canon
- Screenplay by: Max La Bella; Doug Simon; Will Canon
- Story by: Max La Bella
- Produced by: Lee Clay; James Wan
- Starring: Frank Grillo; Dustin Milligan; Cody Horn; Maria Bello
- Cinematography: Michael Fimognari
- Edited by: Josh Schaeffer
- Music by: Dan Marocco
- Production company: First Point Entertainment
- Distributed by: Dimension Films
- Release dates: February 12, 2015 (Brazil); July 27, 2017 (United States)
- Running time: 83 minutes
- Country: United States
- Language: English
- Budget: $3 million
- Box office: $4.7 million

Demonic is a 2015 American supernatural horror film directed by Will Canon and written by Max La Bella, Canon and Doug Simon from a story by La Bella. The film stars Frank Grillo, Dustin Milligan, Cody Horn and Maria Bello.

The film released internationally in Brazil on February 12, 2015, and was released in the United States on July 27, 2017, by Dimension Films.

== Plot ==
A violent slaughter occurs in an abandoned house in Louisiana where three college students are found dead. Detective Mark Lewis examines the crime scene and finds a shocked survivor, John, before calling reinforcements. Several police cars then arrive at the house alongside an ambulance with psychologist, Dr. Elizabeth Klein. She talks to John, who tells her that a séance performed in the house called the attention of many spirits, including one he identified as his mother, and that two of the group members – his pregnant girlfriend, Michelle, and her ex-boyfriend, Bryan – are still missing.

The following scenes consist of two interlaced plots: one shows the interrogation of John by Dr. Klein and the investigation of videotapes found in the house by police officers, and the other shows the actual events (often filmed by a camera) that John and the five other visitors of the house experienced, including several paranormal phenomena.

Bryan is later found alive but runs away from the police, ending up cornered in a store. John hears the news on the police radio and, in a fit of rage, grabs a radio, shouting at Bryan to tell him where Michelle is. Bryan begins to act strangely while John almost goes into cardiac arrest. Elizabeth screams for Mark to stop Bryan before he kills John, wherein Mark promptly shoots Bryan dead.

Mark returns to the house and discovers a secret area where he finds Michelle. As the paramedics are rolling her on the stretcher, Elizabeth discovers that John killed everybody at the same time that Detective Mark finds John's lifeless body hanging.

As it turns out, the "John" that Elizabeth was interrogating was a demon, who, as he begins to make Elizabeth choke, elaborates on the events that transpired – the seal the group found in the living room is what bound him to the house; John's mother was supposed to be the vessel of his escape, his possessing John, killing everybody and that he needs to cross the seal – in order to set himself free. The lights begin to turn on and off, and as Mark bursts open the door, the demon vanishes just as Michelle is wheeled out of the house.

The film concludes with Michelle in the ambulance showing a sinister figure moving in her belly.

== Cast ==
- Frank Grillo as Detective Mark Lewis
- Dustin Milligan as John Matthews
- Cody Horn as Michelle
- Scott Mechlowicz as Bryan
- Megan Park as Jules
- Aaron Yoo as Donnie
- Maria Bello as Dr. Elizabeth Klein
- Alex Goode as Sam
- Terence Rosemore as Jenkins
- Jesse Steccato as Peter
- Meyer DeLeeuw as Henry
- Griff Furst as Reeves
- Thomas Francis Murphy as Abbernacky
- Ashton Leigh as Sara Mathews, John's deceased mother

== Production ==
On May 13, 2011, the film was announced under the title House of Horror, with James Wan set to produce. On November 22, 2011, it was announced Xavier Gens would direct the film. On January 23, 2013, Maria Bello and Frank Grillo joined the cast. On October 8, 2013, the film was retitled Demonic. On July 31, 2014, it was announced that the film would be released on December 12, 2014. On September 19, 2014, the film was pushed back to an unknown date.

== Release ==
The film was released internationally first in Brazil on February 12, 2015, under the title A Casa dos Mortos, which translates as The House of the Dead. The film then premiered on Turkey on May 8, 2015, under the title Şeytani Ruhlar which translates as Satanic Spirits. The film was also released in Mexico on August 21, 2015, under the title Demoníaco, a direct translation of the original title. The film was released in the United States on July 27, 2017, on Spike TV.
