= A Change of Heart (film) =

2017 American comedy film

- Directed by: Kenny Ortega
- Written by: James Orr; Luis Santeiro
- Produced by: Emilio Estefan; Kenny Ortega
- Starring: Jim Belushi; Virginia Madsen; Kathy Najimy; Aimee Teegarden; Cody Horn; Dawn Olivieri; Eduardo Yáñez; Gloria Estefan; William Levy
- Cinematography: Steve Mason
- Edited by: Don Brochu
- Production company: Surprise Film
- Release date: March 10, 2017 (Miami)
- Country: United States
- Language: English

A Change of Heart is a 2017 American comedy film directed by Kenny Ortega and starring Jim Belushi, Virginia Madsen, Kathy Najimy, Eduardo Yáñez, Gloria Estefan and William Levy.

The film depicts Hank, a man who believes in traditional concepts of marriage and fears social changes. He receives a heart transplant in a surgery and learns that he owes his life to a drag queen. He has the option to embrace diversity or to continue living in fear.

== Plot ==
Hank is afraid of the way that society is changing. When he suffers a heart attack, he gets a transplant from a Puerto Rican drag queen.

== Cast ==
- Jim Belushi as Hank
- Virginia Madsen as Deena
- Kathy Najimy as Ruthie
- Aimee Teegarden as Josie
- Cody Horn as Teddy
- Dawn Olivieri as Laurie
- Eduardo Yáñez as Cousin David
- Gloria Estefan as Dr. Farjado
- William Levy as Carlos
- Mauricio Sanchez as "Corky"
- Roberto Escobar as Tio Ruben

== Production ==
The film was shot in Miami.

== Release ==
A Change of Heart premiered on March 10, 2017 at the Miami International Film Festival. It premiered in Europe at the 2017 Parool Film Fest in Amsterdam, the Netherlands. It has never been released theatrically or on home video/streaming.
