= Alan F. Horn =

American entertainment industry executive

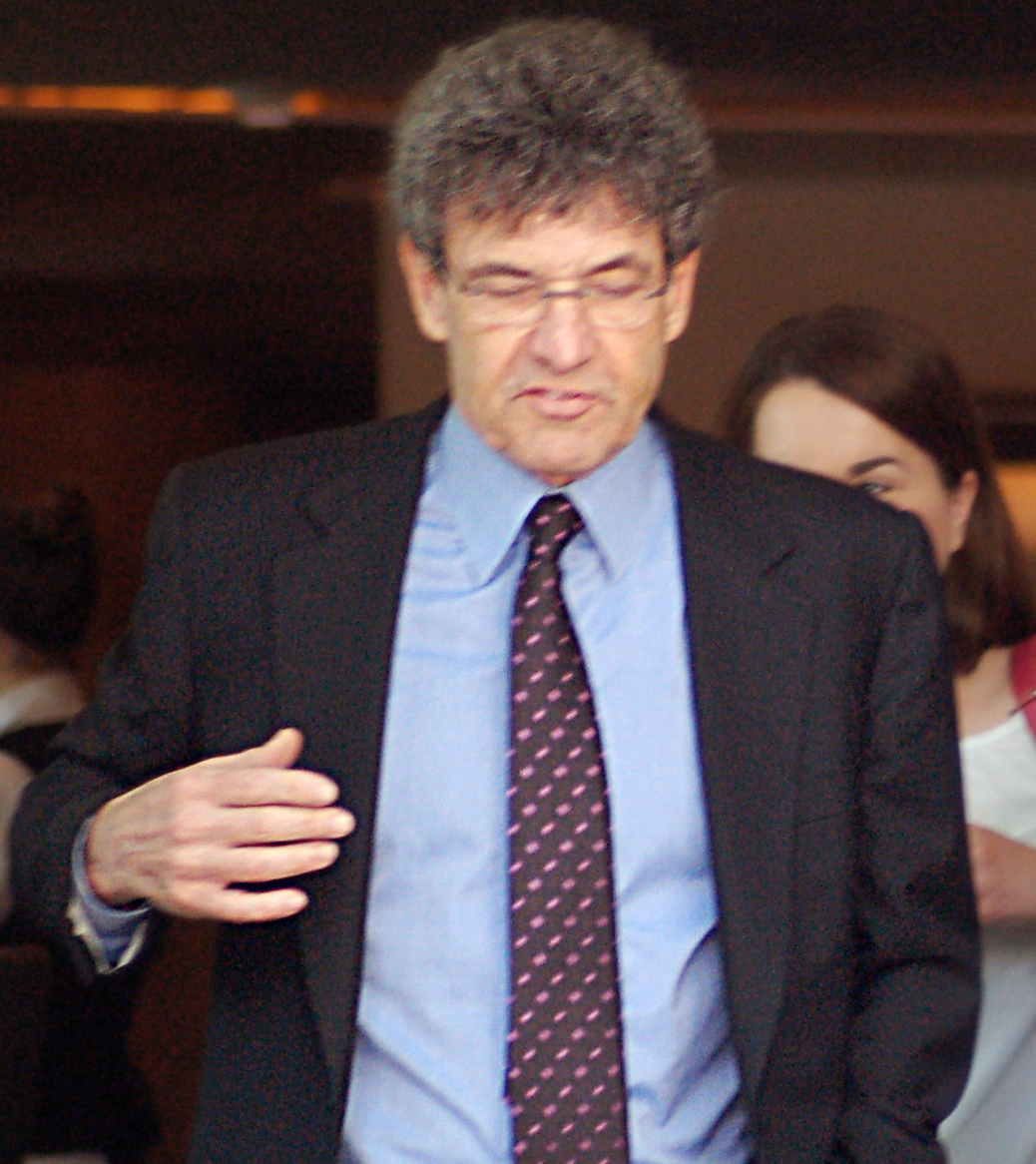
- Horn attending the ceremony for Julia Louis-Dreyfus receiving a star on the Hollywood Walk of Fame, May 2010
- Born: Alan Frederick Horn; February 28, 1943 (age 83); New York City, New York, U.S.
- Education: Union College; Harvard University
- Occupation: Film executive
- Years active: 1973–present
- Employer(s): Warner Bros. (1999–2012; 2022–present); Walt Disney Studios (2012–2021)
- Title: Chairman, Chief Creative Officer
- Spouse: Cindy Harrell
- Children: 2, including Cody

Alan Frederick Horn (born February 28, 1943) is an American entertainment industry executive. He was the president and COO of Warner Bros. from 1999 to 2012. He served as the chairman of Walt Disney Studios from 2012 to 2020. During his tenure at Disney, Horn also served as the chief creative officer from 2019 to 2021. He agreed to depart from Disney, effective December 31, 2021.

In July 2022, Horn rejoined Warner Bros., having assumed a position as a consultant with Warner Bros. Discovery.

== Personal life ==
Horn grew up Jewish in Riverhead on Long Island, New York. He graduated from Union College in Schenectady, New York, in 1964. In 1971, he received an MBA degree from Harvard Business School in Cambridge, Massachusetts.

Horn and his wife, Cindy Harrell, a former model. live in the East Gate Bel Air section of Los Angeles They have two daughters, actress Cody, and Cassidy.

== Career ==
Horn worked at Norman Lear's television production companies, Tandem Productions and Embassy Communications, the latter of which he was chairman before becoming president of 20th Century Fox in October 1986, soon after it was acquired by Rupert Murdoch. Horn was one of the founders of Castle Rock Entertainment in 1987. There, he supervised films including A Few Good Men (1992), The Green Mile (1999), When Harry Met Sally (1989), and the sitcom Seinfeld (1989–1998).

Horn became president and COO of Warner Bros. in 1999, where he ran the studio in partnership with chairman and CEO Barry Meyer for 12 years. Under Horn's leadership, Warner Bros. had many hits across film and television, including the Harry Potter series (2001–2011), Christopher Nolan's The Dark Knight Trilogy (2005–2012), Friends, ER, Smallville, The People's Court, Judge Mathis, Two and a Half Men and The Big Bang Theory. He was also the executive producer of the three films in The Hobbit Trilogy. At age 68, Horn was forced to retire as president and COO of Warner Bros., at the behest of Time Warner Chairman and CEO Jeffrey Bewkes who wanted to groom younger talent to take over at the studio, with Meyer relinquishing his role as studio CEO in March 2013 to be succeeded by Kevin Tsujihara.

In 2012, at the urging of The Walt Disney Company chairman and CEO Bob Iger, Horn was lured out of retirement to become the chairman of Walt Disney Studios, replacing Rich Ross who had been dismissed from the position after having conflicts with Pixar executives. Horn established a successful working relationship with Pixar, Marvel Studios, Lucasfilm, and 20th Century Studios which operated with great autonomy under Disney's ownership, while also overseeing strong box office releases from Walt Disney Pictures and Walt Disney Animation Studios.

In 2017, he said of his professional success:

I have this... theory that whoever is working in a job deserves to stay... unless they prove that they don't deserve to be in the job.

On May 1, 2019, Horn was given the added title of chief creative officer (CCO) of Walt Disney Studios. In December 2020, it was announced that effective January 1, 2021, Alan Bergman would become the new chairman of the Walt Disney Studios while Horn would remain as the studios' chief creative officer. In October 2021, it was announced that Horn would be retiring for a second time at the end of the year, and the position would likely not be filled. In July 2022, it was reported that he would hold a position with Warner Bros. Discovery. Starting August 1, 2022, Horn began serving as a business consultant during a transitionary period after the acquisition of WarnerMedia by Discovery, Inc.

Horn receives a "Special Thanks" in James Gunn's 2025 film Superman.
