= Jake Silbermann =

American actor, writer and producer (born 1983)

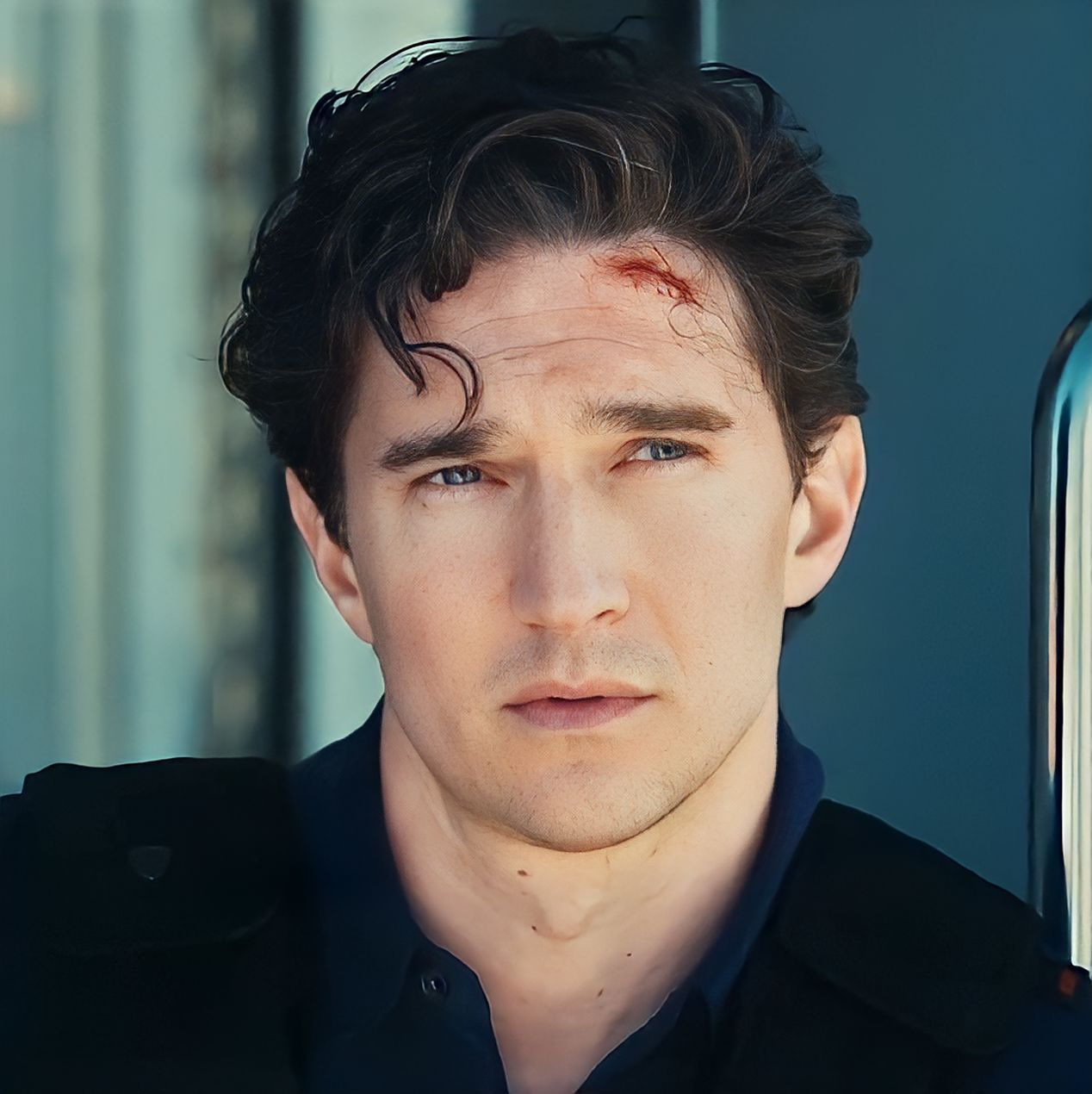
- Silbermann in 2023
- Born: Jake Andrew Silbermann; June 1, 1983 (age 43); New York City, U.S.
- Occupations: Actor, writer, producer
- Years active: 2006–present

Jake Silbermann (/ˈsɪlbərmən/; born on June 1, 1983) is an American actor, writer and producer.

== Biography ==
Silbermann was born June 1, 1983, and is a native of New York City. He graduated with a Bachelor of Arts in theater from Syracuse University, where he participated in many productions including Piñata, Three Sisters and True West. He played a leading role in the 2006 film, Brunch of the Living Dead.

The actor joined the cast of As the World Turns in March 2007 and attended the GLAAD Media Awards with co-stars Van Hansis and Jennifer Landon two months before he even aired. His on-air debut was on June 1, 2007, in the role of Noah Mayer. Noah's romance with Luke Snyder (Van Hansis) was featured on Entertainment Tonight.

Despite the fact that Silbermann identifies as straight, when asked if he was worried about playing a gay man in his first high-profile gig, Silbermann responded: "I didn't hesitate for a second."

Prior to joining the cast of As the World Turns, he appeared in a national television ad campaign for Gillette Fusion Power.

== Career ==
=== As the World Turns ===
Silbermann joined the CBS soap opera As the World Turns as Noah Mayer, on June 1, 2007, which was also his 24th birthday. With Luke Snyder (played by Van Hansis), Silbermann's character was part of a pairing hailed as the first gay male soap opera supercouple despite controversy about their storyline.

=== Primetime appearances ===
On April 28, 2008, Silbermann appeared on an episode of Gossip Girl, "Desperately Seeking Serena".

On April 29, 2012, he appeared in an episode of The Good Wife, "Affairs of State" as Jared Buck, a college wrestler whose ex-girlfriend has been raped.

On November 18, 2014, he appeared in an episode of Person of Interest, "Point of Origin" under the role of Phil Cain, a young officer of the NYPD.

On December 5, 2018, he appeared in episodes five and six of The Marvelous Mrs. Maisel, "Midnight at the Concord" and "Let's face the music and dance" as Marv Feinberg.

On February 11, 2019, he appeared in an episode of Bull, "Leave it All Behind" as Chris Fields.

In July 2023, he appeared in the last three episodes of the series finale of The Blacklist, "Arthur Hudson", "Raymond Reddington (No.00): Pt. 1" and "Raymond Reddington (No.00): Good Night"

=== Commercials and modeling ===
Jake Silbermann made his debut on a television commercial for Gillette in the 2006 "Gillette Fusion Power" commercial that was featured internationally.

Silbermann signed in 2008 with Robyn Ziegler Management, DNA Model Management in New York City.

Silbermann appeared in a 2009 AT&T commercial.

He also appeared in a 2011 Canon commercial, the Canon Cinema EOS "Coffee Shop".

In December 2016, Silbermann co-starred in a commercial for the BMW brand that was directed by Elle Ginter, called "Retrospect".

== Filmography ==
Year	Title	Role	Notes
2006	Brunch of the Living Dead	Jeff	Short
2007	Guiding Light	Porter (uncredited)	Episode 15151: "Episode #1.15151"
2007–2010	As the World Turns	Noah Mayer	Series regular 222 episodes
2008	Gossip Girl	Guy #1	Season 1 Episode 15: "Desperately Seeking Serena"
2009–2010	Studio the Show	Wayne	
2010	Goodnight Elizabeth	Brad	Short
2010	Stuffer	Haken	Short
2011	The Good Wife	Jared Buck	Season 3 Episode 6: "Affairs of State"
2014	Person of Interest	Phil Cain	Season 4 Episode 8: "Point of Origin"
2015	Echo Black: Burn Another Day	Businessman	Music Video
2016	Let Me Make You a Martyr	Lamen	
2017	Pain and Suffering: A Legal Comedy	Lenny Rosen	Short
2017	BMW: Retrospect		Video
2018	Red Dead Redemption II	Captain Lyndon Monroe (voice)	Video Game
2018	The Marvelous Mrs. Maisel	Marv	Season 2 Episode 6: "Let's Face the Music and Dance"
2018	Gray Ground	Ross	Miniseries; Season 1 Episode 4: "Out of Office"
2019	The Report	Yoked Up CIA Officer	
2019	Bull	Chris Fields	Season 3 Episode 14: "Leave It All Behind"
2019	Twelve	Coach Lynch	
2020	The Atlantic City Story	Michael	
2023	The Blacklist	Agent Ishwood	3 episodes
2026	Barbizon	Pink	

=== Theatre ===
- Dracula (2010) as Jonathan Harker, Off-Broadway production at the Little Shubert Theater directed by Paul Alexander.
- Phaedra Backwards (2011) as Hippolytus, Off-Broadway production at The McCarter Theatre by Marina Carr.
- Derby Day (2011) as Johnny Ballard, Off-Broadway production at CTC by Samuel Brett Williams.
- 3C (2012) as Brad, Off-Off-Broadway production at the Rattlestick by David Adjmi.
- Marie Antoinette (2012) as Axel Von Fersen, Off-Broadway production at the A.R.T./Yale Rep by David Adjmi.
- The Assembled Parties (2013) as Scotty/Tim Bascov, Broadway production at the Manhatthan theatre Club by Richard Greenberg.
- Derby Day (2014), a reprise of the show previously debuted in 2011 on NY but in the city of Los Angeles at the Elephant Theatre.
- Picasso at the Lapin Agile (2014) as The Visitor, Off-Broadway production at the Long Wharf Theatre by Steve Martin.
- Danny and the Deep Blue Sea (2023) as Danny (u/s), Off-Broadway production at the Lucille Lortel Theatre by John Patrick Shanley.
- Death of a Salesman (2026) as Stanley, Broadway production at the Winter Garden Theatre by Arthur Miller.
