= Flakiss =

American rapper and actress

- Born: Yahira Arazeli Garcia; Sacramento, CA
- Genres: Hip hop
- Occupations: Rapper, actress
- Instruments: Vocals, rapping
- Label: Univision Records

Yahira Arazeli Garcia, known professionally as Flakiss, is an American rapper and actress known for such films as End of Watch.

Born Yahira Arazeli Garcia, she got the nickname Flakiss, short for the Spanish flaquita, or "skinny girl," from her mother. Flakiss was raised in South Central.

Flakiss has recorded three hip hop albums for Univision Records. She was focused on Latin hip-hop music, or "urban regional." Some of her influences were Tupac and Missy Elliott. In 2006, she requested to be released from her contract and in 2008, she left music for a while to focus on her life.

Flakiss made her acting debut in the film End of Watch. The director, David Ayer, had been a fan of Flakiss's music and cast her in the film. Flakiss played the character of La La in the movie.
