= End of Watch =

2012 film by David Ayer

- Theatrical release poster
- Directed by: David Ayer
- Written by: David Ayer
- Produced by: John Lesher; David Ayer; Nigel Sinclair; Matt Jackson
- Starring: Jake Gyllenhaal; Michael Peña; Anna Kendrick; Natalie Martinez; America Ferrera; Frank Grillo; Cody Horn; David Harbour
- Cinematography: Roman Vasyanov
- Edited by: Dody Dorn
- Music by: David Sardy
- Production companies: Exclusive Media; EFF-Hedge Fund Films; Crave Films; Le Grisbi Productions
- Distributed by: Open Road Films
- Release dates: September 8, 2012 (TIFF); September 21, 2012 (United States)
- Running time: 109 minutes
- Country: United States
- Language: English
- Budget: $7–15 million
- Box office: $57.6 million

End of Watch is a 2012 American action thriller film written and directed by David Ayer. It stars Jake Gyllenhaal and Michael Peña as Brian Taylor and Mike Zavala, two Los Angeles Police Department officers who work in South Central Los Angeles. The film focuses on their day-to-day police work, their dealings with a certain group of gang members, their friendship with each other, and their personal relationships.

Ayer, who had written several police procedural films previously, wanted the film to focus more on the friendship between partners and daily police work and subordinate the contextual elements of the drug trafficking story taking place on the streets of south-central Los Angeles. Gyllenhaal, Peña, and other cast members underwent an intensive training program to prepare for their roles as police officers. Filming took place in Los Angeles in August 2011 with a budget of $7 million.

End of Watch premiered on September 8, 2012, at the Toronto International Film Festival and was released in American theaters on September 21 by Open Road Films, receiving generally positive reviews and grossing over $57 million at the box office. The film received a number of accolades, including two Independent Spirit Award nominations.

As of 2022, a series adaptation of End of Watch is being developed by Fox Entertainment.

== Plot ==
Los Angeles Police Department officers Brian Taylor and Mike Zavala are close friends and partners in the LAPD's Newton Division, assigned to patrol a high crime area of South Central Los Angeles. Taylor, a United States Marine Corps veteran, records their activities for a college class after they return to duty from a recent officer-involved shooting.

At a public disturbance call, Tre, a Bloods gang member, yells racial insults at Zavala, who responds by accepting a one-on-one fistfight. Zavala wins and earns Tre's respect for not charging him with assault. Later that night, Tre and his fellow Bloods are attacked in a drive-by shooting by the Mexican-American Curbside Locos Gang. The following night, the officers respond to a noise complaint at a house party, where Taylor and Zavala encounter Curbside Locos Gang members "Big Evil" and "La La". Taylor and Zavala rescue children from a house fire while on patrol and are awarded the Medal of Valor.

During a traffic stop, they arrest a man who is in possession of several ornate firearms and large amounts of cash. Taylor urges Zavala to join him in investigating further, leading them to another man guarding a home full of human trafficking victims. When ICE agents intervene, the officers learn that the house is tied to the Sinaloa Cartel and are strongly urged to stay clear due to possible reprisals. Taylor soon becomes engaged to his girlfriend Janet, and Zavala's wife Gabby gives birth to their first child.

One night, Taylor and Zavala respond to a call from their rookie fellow officer, Sook. Arriving on scene, they find her partner Van Hauser has been stabbed through the eye and rescue Sook from being savagely beaten nearby; both survive but promptly retire. Taylor marries Janet, and at their wedding Zavala tells Taylor that, should anything happen to him, he will take care of Janet. The next day, the officers are called to perform a wellness check on an elderly woman, but in her house they discover large amounts of heroin, dismembered corpses, and a message from the cartel. Unbeknownst to them, ICE has eavesdropped on a cartel phone call ordering the two officers "green-lit" for assassination; Big Evil, La La, and others are tasked with killing them.

While on patrol, the officers encounter Tre who, as a favor from their earlier encounter, warns them that some friends who were recently released from Folsom State Prison learned that both officers were green-lit, but Taylor and Zavala shrug it off. Taylor reveals to Zavala that Janet is pregnant. Taylor and Zavala are baited into chasing a reckless driver into an apartment complex where they are ambushed by the Curbside Locos Gang. They kill several gangsters and fight their way into an alley, but Taylor is shot in the chest. As Zavala tries to treat Taylor's injuries, the assassins arrive and fire on the officers, apparently killing them. Shortly after, LAPD backup arrives in force and guns down the assassins when they refuse to surrender.

Zavala is killed, but Taylor survives, having been shielded by Zavala's body. At Zavala's funeral, Taylor tries to deliver a eulogy but only manages to say a single sentence: "He was my brother". In a flashback to the day of the shooting, Zavala recounts to Taylor a humorous story from the first time he and his wife slept together, before the two receive a call from dispatch.

== Cast ==
=== Police ===
- Jake Gyllenhaal as Officer Brian Taylor
- Michael Peña as Officer Miguel 'Mike Z' Zavala
- David Harbour as Officer Van Hauser
- Frank Grillo as Sergeant Daniels
- Jaime FitzSimons as Captain Reese
- America Ferrera as Officer Orozco
- Cody Horn as Officer Davis
- Kristy Wu as Officer Sook

=== Family ===
- Natalie Martinez as Gabby Zavala
- Anna Kendrick as Janet Taylor

=== Criminals ===
- Cle Shaheed Sloan as 'Tre'
- Shondrella Avery as 'Bonita'
- Maurice Compte as 'Big Evil'
- Richard Cabral as 'Demon'
- Diamonique as 'Wicked'
- Flakiss as 'La La'

== Production ==
=== Development ===
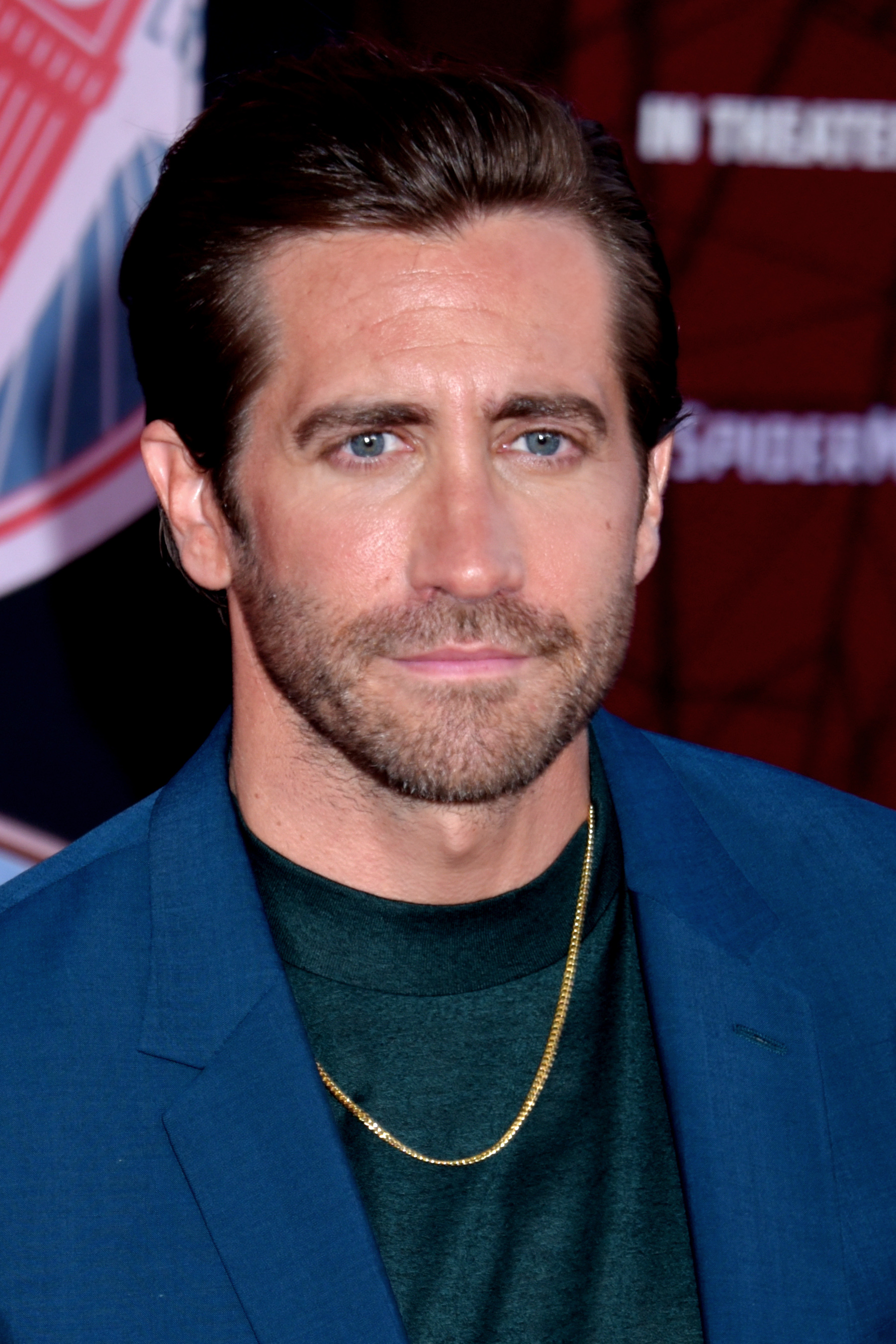
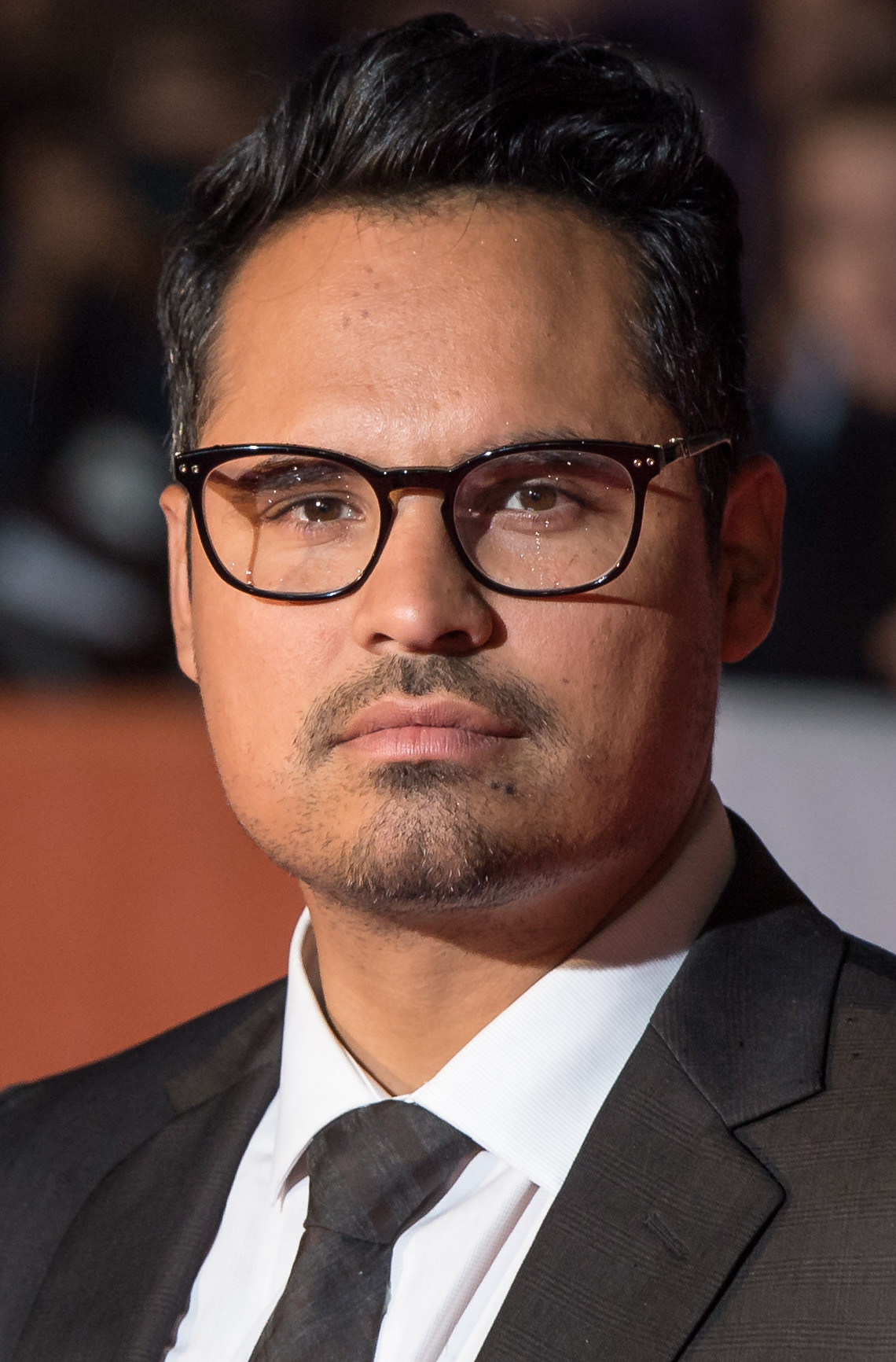
Jake Gyllenhaal (left) and Michael Peña (right) undertook five months of intensive training to prepare for their roles in the film.

David Ayer, who wrote and directed End of Watch, grew up in South Central Los Angeles and has had numerous friends in the LAPD. He had written several films previously about police officers in Los Angeles, but while these depicted rogue and corrupt officers, he wanted to feature honest, ethical police work in End of Watch. In contrast to his previous works, Ayer wanted to focus on the friendship between Taylor and Zavala and "have all the cop stuff drop away and become secondary to the chemistry of these guys". Ayer wrote the screenplay over six days in December 2010. Jaime FitzSimons, a longtime friend of Ayer and a former police officer with the LAPD, served as the film's technical advisor, and his experiences from working in Los Angeles inspired several plot points of the film.

Jake Gyllenhaal was the first to be cast in the film; after receiving the script, he read it in an hour and immediately contacted Ayer. Michael Peña was cast shortly after, following a string of auditions. He and Gyllenhaal did not bond immediately but gradually became close friends over the process of training and filming. Gyllenhaal and Peña undertook five months of intensive training under the guidance of FitzSimons to prepare for their roles—this included 12-hour ride-alongs with multiple Greater Los Angeles Area law enforcement agencies up to three times a week, as well as training in hand-to-hand combat, police tactics and weapons. On his first ride-along, Gyllenhaal witnessed a murder during a drug bust while incognito in the back of an LAPD patrol car. Tactical training was also given to the other actors playing police officers, including David Harbour, America Ferrera, Cody Horn, and Frank Grillo.

=== Filming ===
End of Watch was filmed on location in South Central Los Angeles, primarily in the area of the LAPD's Newton Division, one of the most violent and gang-affiliated areas of the city. Filming took place over 22 days in August 2011, with a budget of $7.5 million. The film was shot in a combination of found footage style and traditional photography. Most scenes were captured by four cameras simultaneously: these included a handheld camera operated by Gyllenhaal, cameras clipped to Gyllenhaal and Peña's vests, and dashboard footage from their patrol car. Some scenes were shot entirely by Gyllenhaal. An alternate ending of the film was shot where both of the main characters died, but Ayer ultimately chose to retain the original ending.

== Release ==
=== Theatrical ===
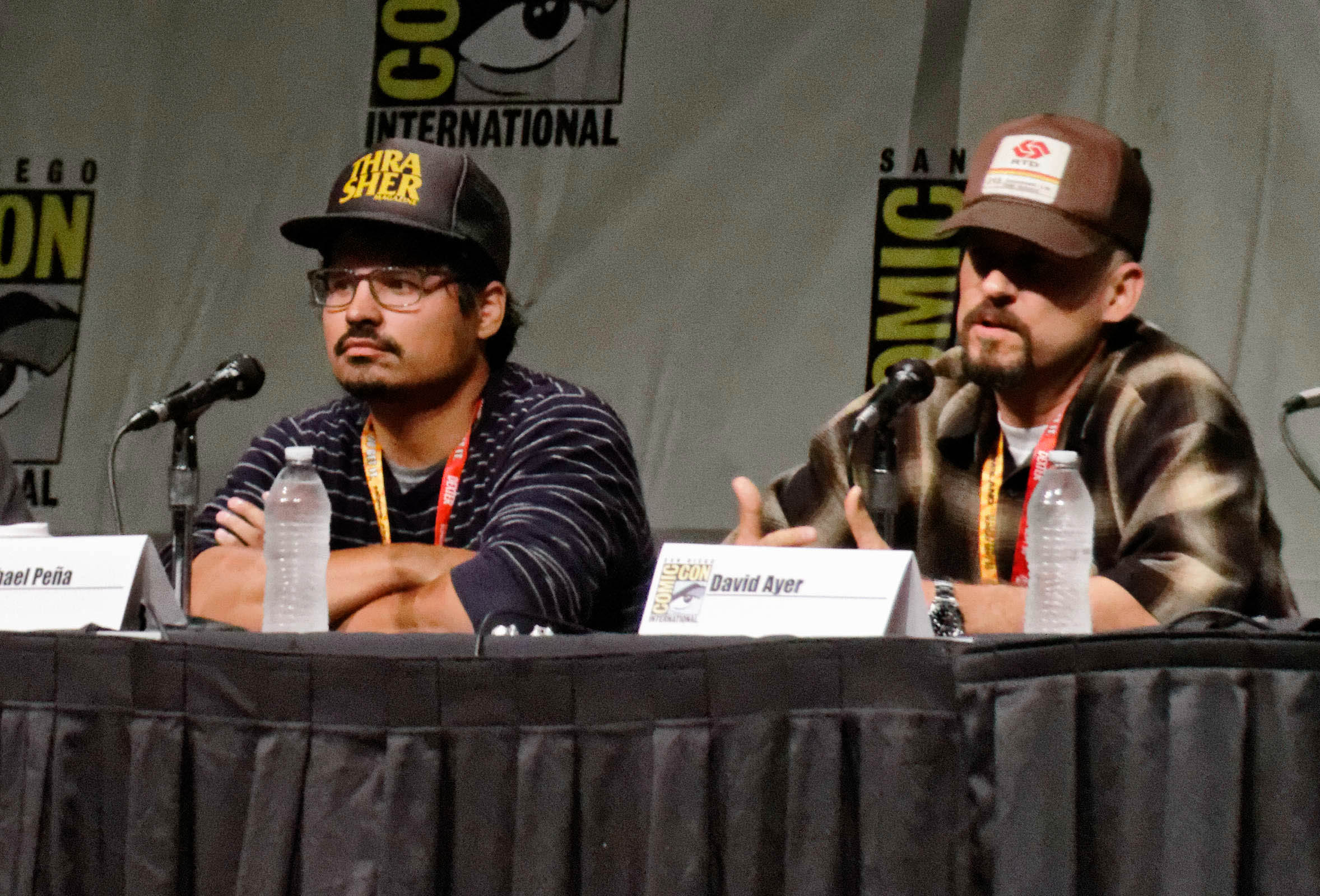
Michael Peña (left) and David Ayer promoting the film at the 2012 San Diego Comic-Con

The world premiere of End of Watch was held on September 8, 2012, at the Toronto International Film Festival. It was originally scheduled to be released theatrically on September 28, 2012, but the release was later moved to September 21.

=== Home media ===
End of Watch was released on DVD and Blu-ray on January 22, 2013, by Universal Studios Home Entertainment.

== Reception ==
=== Box office ===
End of Watch grossed $41 million in North America and $16.6 million in other territories for a total gross of $57.6 million, against its budget of $7 million.

In its opening weekend in the United States, the film grossed $13.1 million, finishing first at the box office. It was especially popular among Hispanics, who made up 32% of the audience on the opening weekend, and a writer for The Hollywood Reporter attributed the film's popularity to strong word of mouth. The film was initially released in 2,730 theaters and expanded to 2,780 locations in its second week of release. On December 7, the film was given a nationwide re-release in 1,259 theaters shortly after it received two Independent Spirit Award nominations. On the first weekend of its re-release, it grossed $752,000.

=== Critical response ===
On review aggregator Rotten Tomatoes the film has an 85% approval rating based on 183 reviews, with an average rating of 7.2/10. The website's consensus states: "End of Watch has the energy, devotion to characters, and charismatic performances to overcome the familiar pitfalls of its genre and handheld format." On Metacritic, the film has a score of 68 out of 100, based on reviews from 37 critics, indicating "generally favorable" reviews. Audiences polled by CinemaScore gave the film an average grade of "A−" on an A+ to F scale.

Roger Ebert of the Chicago Sun-Times gave the film four out of four stars, calling it "one of the best police movies in recent years, a virtuoso fusion of performances and often startling action", and went on to name the film the fourth best of 2012. Film critic James Berardinelli described End of Watch as "satisfying and emotionally potent ... a good, gritty drama of the sort that seems increasingly rare within the thriller genre", giving the film 3.5 out of 4 stars. Olly Richards, writing for Empire, gave the film four out of five stars and summarized it as "a collection of cop-movie clichés but presented with sufficient flair and strong performances that the ride is enough, even if it's on rails". While New York's Bilge Ebiri found the film largely unrealistic and Ayer's direction "serviceable at best", he wrote that "Ayer and his cast appear to have so convincingly nailed the way these characters talk and act that you might not even notice the film slipping from workaday grit into out-and-out myth."

Critics praised End of Watch for its avoidance of clichés often used in police films, particularly the buddy cop genre. Peter Debruge of Variety wrote that "Like a knife in the eye, End of Watch cuts past the cliches of standard police procedurals" and praised Ayer for depicting the LAPD as "an honorable and efficient organization of people working together". Entertainment Weekly's Lisa Schwarzbaum, who gave the film an A−, described it as "one of the best American cop movies I've seen in a long time [and] also one of the few I've seen that pay serious attention to what cop life feels like, both on and off duty". In a review for The Globe and Mail, however, Rick Groen opined that the focus on "saintly" police officers was less interesting than Ayer's "trademark grit and authenticity".

The performances of Peña and Gyllenhaal were also praised by critics. Peter Debruge commended the realism that the two actors brought to their roles, saying, "Gyllenhaal and Peña so completely reinvent themselves in-character. Instead of wearing the roles like costumes or uniforms, they let the job seep into their skin." The Los Angeles Times's Betsy Sharkey applauded the chemistry between the two lead actors, as well as their individual performances, writing, "As good as Gyllenhaal is in this, Peña nearly steals the show." In a review for USA Today, Claudia Puig commended Gyllenhaal for "giv[ing] his best performance since Brokeback Mountain" and Peña for "shin[ing] with charisma". Roger Ebert highlighted End of Watch as "one of the performances of [Peña's] career" and praised the performances given by the supporting cast, including Natalie Martinez and Anna Kendrick.

An aspect of the film criticized in numerous reviews was its handheld camerawork and cinematography. Richard Corliss wrote for Time that the found footage style of cinematography "borders on the ludicrous" and that "the tactic fatally substitutes photo realism for fauxto realism". Similarly, The Washington Post's Michael O'Sullivan found the aesthetic gimmicky, overused, and "an unnecessary distraction from the story". On the other hand, Amy Biancolli of the San Francisco Chronicle felt that although the cinematography was inconsistent, "it's used to deepen its main characters" and "lends the film a lively intimacy".

Other reviewers criticized the casting of minorities as gang members. Manohla Dargis of The New York Times pointed out that "almost all of [the crimes are] committed by the black and mainly brown people", while The Globe and Mail's Rick Groen criticized "the script's penchant for over demonizing the ghetto's black residents".

=== Accolades ===
Awards and nominations
Award	Date of ceremony	Category	Nominee(s)	Result
Critics' Choice Movie Awards	January 10, 2013	Best Actor in an Action Movie	Jake Gyllenhaal	Nominated
Golden Trailer Awards	May 3, 2013	Best Independent TV Spot	Open Road Films, Aspect Ratio	Won
Golden Trailer Awards	May 3, 2013	Best Action	Open Road Films, Ignition Creative	Nominated
Golden Trailer Awards	May 3, 2013	Best Foreign Action Trailer	Tobis Film	Nominated
Independent Spirit Awards	February 23, 2013	Best Supporting Male	Michael Peña	Nominated
Independent Spirit Awards	February 23, 2013	Best Cinematography	Roman Vasyanov	Nominated
Key Art Awards	October 24, 2013	Best Audio/Visual Technique	Open Road Films, Aspect Ratio	2nd place
Key Art Awards	October 24, 2013	Best Trailer – Audio/Visual	Open Road Films, Ignition Creative	3rd place
London Film Festival	October 20, 2012	Best Film		Nominated
MTV Movie Awards	April 14, 2013	Best Latino Actor	Michael Peña	Nominated
National Board of Review	January 8, 2013	Top Ten Independent Films		Won
Zurich Film Festival	September 29, 2012	Best International Feature Film		Nominated
