= Luke Snyder and Noah Mayer =

Fictional characters in the television series 'As the World Turns'

Luke and Noah (Van Hansis and Jake Silbermann)

Luke Snyder and Noah Mayer are fictional characters and a supercouple from the American CBS daytime drama As the World Turns. Luke was portrayed by Van Hansis, and Noah was portrayed by Jake Silbermann. On Internet message boards, the couple is referred to by the portmanteau "Nuke" (for Noah and Luke). They are notable for being one of American daytime television's first gay male couples.

The two made history on August 17, 2007, when the show "featured the first-ever" gay male kiss in American daytime. The YouTube video of the kiss was one of the top-watched the following day. The kiss was later labeled "legendary" and was, at the time, one of the most viewed selections in the history of YouTube with over 2 million hits.

In other press, the two were named one of television's top power couples by TV Guide and one of the great supercouples by Entertainment Weekly. They are American soap operas' first gay male supercouple.

== Background ==
When Noah Mayer arrived in Oakdale in June 2007 and entranced resident gay character Luke Snyder, CBS's As the World Turns "became the first soap to depict a fully realized romantic male couple as an integral part of the show". There had been other gay male characters on U.S. daytime television, before; for example, One Life to Live's Billy Douglas (portrayed by a young Ryan Phillippe), but Luke and Noah represented a change in the genre. Noah was at first presented as heterosexual and devoted to girlfriend Maddie Coleman. This soon began to change. The writers had always planned for Noah to be revealed as gay. The storyline and his interaction with Luke were promised to viewers as the start of a depiction of a healthy gay male romance.

Within the story, after spending time with Luke, Noah is seen struggling to come to terms with his sexuality, and is often angry and confused. Luke and Noah's portrayers, Hansis and Silbermann, spoke with magazine The Advocate about the attention the storyline has generated. "The fan response has been really great to both the individual characters and where we're taking the relationship," Silbermann stated. "Noah and Luke were voted top couple in a Soap Opera Digest poll. The funny thing is, a lot of people want them to be happy, but a lot want them to suffer heartache and tragedy — because that's what couples on daytime TV do. It's a good sign, actually." Hansis said that "it does throw you a bit, especially since this was [his] first big role on television" and "You go from waiting tables to doing interviews with national magazines and people saying that you changed their lives. It's definitely tricky".

Addressing the depth of his character's romance with Luke and its effects on people, Silbermann cited his disbelief. "I knew what the role was when I signed on," he said. "But I guess I'm jaded — I honestly didn't think it would get so much press. Of course, I'm grateful and honored to be telling this story and doing it in an interesting and respectful way."

=== Actors' approach ===
Actors have been known to bring some part of their real experience into the roles they portray. Hansis and Silbermann also spoke of this aspect regarding their own roles; they detailed what, if anything, they find useful in their lives when creating Luke and Noah. Hansis stated, "Luke is all about the need to be loved and accepted. I think that need is universal. Life is about acceptance from the people who you want to love you. If that means family, a wife, a husband, a girlfriend/boyfriend, a best friend, you just want people to love you for who you are. Anyone can relate to that." Silbermann said, "I don't bring any specific experiences to Noah. I think we can all relate to an unrequited love or a romance filled with obstacles. That's really all this story is."

As the World Turns executive producer Chris Goutman stated in a WGN radio interview that Hansis and Silbermann are "both very modest actors". He credited them with having the ability to show the proper emotions in subtle and effective ways (i.e. "Luke's knowing smile and longing look at Noah, Noah's inner pain and fear of his father"). When asked if they rehearse together to decide which facial expressions they will use to convey these emotions in any given scene, Hansis replied, "No. We rehearse together to make sure we have the lines right. But it's not usually about the acting, its just running lines." He said that the "acting comes" when the cameras are on. "We are comfortable with each other as actors, so if one of us does something new during taping, the other just rolls with it and it usually creates some nice moments," said Hansis.

Addressing the couple's possibility of marriage, children, and divorce, Hansis pondered "why can't people on soaps just date?" He said "maybe five years down the line they should have a kid, but not now" and that "[c]ollege has a whole slew of potential soap-worthy storylines. I think a lot of cool stories could come out of that". Silbermann voiced not knowing what the writers may have planned for the couple, but that "the audience can assume it won't be smooth sailing". Hansis clarified: "We have no idea what's happening until we get the scripts, which happens about a week in advance. We can talk to the producers if we want. I have done that once or twice, but they keep the writers and actors pretty separate."

Hansis and Silbermann cited their offscreen friendship as the reason for their ease when portraying intimate scenes between Luke and Noah. "It makes them easier. Jake is a good friend. I know he's got my back and is not going to make me look like an ass onscreen. I hope I return the favor," said Hansis. "I think we work well together and I couldn't have asked for a cooler person to play opposite. Jake is just very down to earth and funny and open to different ideas. It makes every scene very comfortable." Silbermann added, "I think we had become friends before the first kiss... If anything, I think it makes it more comfortable."

== Storyline ==
Luke and Noah meet at WOAK, a local television station in Oakdale, where they are working as interns, but their relationship is complex from the beginning. Luke's first crush for Kevin Davis ended badly when he "came out" to Kevin and was fiercely rejected, and Noah is involved with co-worker Maddie Coleman. In fact, Noah thinks jealously that Luke is pursuing his girlfriend until Luke reveals first his sexual orientation and then his attraction to Noah. After this, Noah struggles with his own feelings for Luke. One day, when Luke is helping Noah with his tie, Noah impulsively kisses him; he tries to shrug this off as a joke before finally admitting to himself and Luke that he meant it. He isn't, however, ready to deal with being gay. Although Luke urges him to be honest with Maddie and to acknowledge his own sexuality, Noah hesitates.

Not completely unaware of the undercurrents between them, Maddie is forced to confront the budding romance between Noah and Luke when her brother Henry tells her that Noah's homophobic father, Army Colonel Winston Mayer, suspects the pair are involved. She asks Luke, and when he urges her to speak to Noah, realizes the truth. She breaks off her relationship with him.

Colonel Mayer does what he can to prevent the young men from coming together, even threatening Luke's mother Lily, but just when he thinks Noah is safely reconciled with Maddie, he comes upon his son and Luke sharing their second kiss. Colonel Mayer disowns his son but later launches a more devious plot to kill Luke and get him out of Noah's life - a plot that is thwarted by Noah and Luke's parents. Noah and Luke come closer than ever as Luke uses physical therapy to recover the use of his legs, paralyzed in the Colonel's attempted murder.

The relationship is not completely smooth, as Noah is still struggling somewhat with his own homosexuality, not able to express his feelings as freely as Luke. Noah continues to work on it, and it is at his instigation that the pair become housemates. While Noah had wanted to get an apartment alone with Luke, he compromises on Luke's suggestion by moving into Luke's family home, although the couple are not permitted to share a bed.

Their new-found closeness is challenged when they meet a young Iraqi woman, Ameera Ali Aziz, who is in the United States on temporary visa and soon to be deported. Noah marries Ameera to help her remain in the United States, which requires that he hide his relationship with Luke and eventually move into a separate house with Ameera to make their relationship seem more legitimate. Ameera, it seems, would like for their relationship to be legitimate, but Noah continues to be devoted to Luke, whom he kisses again while shopping for a birthday present for Ameera.

When Noah visits his father in prison, he crushes the Colonel's hopes by revealing that his marriage to Ameera is in name only and that he and Luke are still a couple. Not long thereafter, Ameera disappears, leaving a note saying that she will be able to stay in the country without the marriage and will have it annulled. Luke and Noah have little time to celebrate before they are advised that the Colonel has escaped from prison, which leads Noah to fear for his boyfriend's safety and also to worry that Ameera has been kidnapped. When Noah tries to track him down, the Colonel assaults him, but he manages to get away and reunite with Luke and Ameera, who has also escaped the Colonel. The Colonel is determined to get Ameera back under his control and tricks the young men with some fake police officers, but Luke calls upon his grandmother Lucinda, who brings real police to protect them. Following a confrontation with his son, the Colonel dives into the water and does not resurface; he is believed dead. Noah blames Luke for this for a time, but the couple eventually reunite after Cyndi Lauper, in town on the True Colors Tour, dedicates a set to Luke. Noah tells Luke he wants to be with him, and the couple kiss again.

After Noah's decision to enlist in the army is derailed by the Don't Ask Don't Tell policy, which he defies, the couple resume living together at the Snyder farm, although they still do not share a bed. Soon thereafter, Luke starts the Luke Snyder Foundation for sick children with money inherited from his birth father's family, and the attorney they hire, Brian, begins throwing road blocks between them, cautioning Luke that being openly gay will hurt his foundation with conservative investors. Ultimately, however, it is Luke himself who causes the couple to break up, when he finds himself pitched in a dirty political campaign against his first love, Kevin. To counter the homophobic attacks of Kevin's supporters, Luke winds up permitting Casey Hughes to stuff the ballot box to ensure that he will win. Noah cannot take part in this dishonesty and refuses to lie for Luke when they are challenged. Feeling also that Luke has unresolved issues about Kevin, he moves out and distances himself.

Luke begins drinking again and while drunk is kissed by Brian, who has married Luke's grandmother Lucinda. Later, Brian tells Luke that, while attracted to Luke, he loves Lucinda. In spite of their agreement, this will not remain secret long. Luke and Noah are struggling to reconnect, but when Luke is jealous of Noah's continued relationship with Maddie (who has interrupted their planned tryst on New Year's Eve), he kisses Brian himself. Noah, who sees this, is angry with Luke for some time, but when the pair finally come together to discuss the matter their anger is overwhelmed by their feelings for each other, and they finally consummate their relationship.

It isn't long before they decide to finally live together in a place of their own. But when they are denied housing because they are gay, Luke turns his Luke Snyder Foundation to LGBT rights. This increases the amount of hate targeted at Luke, who becomes the victim in a hit and run.

After Noah is blinded in an accident at film school, he breaks off with Luke, feeling a need to be independent and blaming Luke, because the couple had been arguing at the time of the accident. Noah finds a specialist, neurosurgeon Reid Oliver, whom he believes he can cure his sight, and Luke tries to lure the arrogant doctor to Oakdale; when promises of money do not work, he successfully blackmails him. In spite of this rocky start, the pair gradually begin a hesitant relationship. When Noah eventually begins to consider reuniting with Luke, Luke is torn - both angry at Noah's prior treatment and confused by his feelings for Reid. Reid eventually resigns from the hospital when he realizes that he must either do so or break off his relationship with Luke, the hospital's biggest donor, but is soon reinstated. Eventually, Reid is mortally injured when his car is struck by a train.

During this time, Noah has been offered a grant to make a film in Los Angeles. When Reid dies, Noah comforts his love, Luke, but while he is willing to remain in Oakdale, Luke urges him to pursue his dream. They share a kiss, and agree that they will visit and one day may finally reunite.

Luke and Noah's last scenes together aired the day before the show's finale. After a 54-year run, As The World Turns was cancelled as of Sept 17, 2010. Luke and Noah's story ended onscreen at WOAK, but as the Executive Producer of the show has said, "Their relationship will endure."

== Reception and impact ==
Same-sex couples on American broadcast television were rare at the time. This adds to the inclusion of same-sex pairings being considered "a very big deal". When Luke and Noah, a gay male teen couple at the time, were added to the soap opera As the World Turns, the decision especially constituted "an actual milestone" in gay visibility, stated Michael Jensen, Editor of AfterElton.com, a website that focuses on the portrayal of gay and bisexual men in the media. CBS's As the World Turns "made that breakthrough in 2007 when Luke Snyder (Van Hansis) fell hard for newcomer Noah Mayer (Jake Silbermann). And viewers fell just as hard for the couple, quickly naming them Nuke as their growing popularity helped to push the show’s ratings up". The couple became "so popular" that a 2007 poll named them "the most popular couple on As the World Turns and one of the seven hottest couples on all of daytime television".

=== Groundbreaking kiss and romance ===
Luke and Noah kiss made famous in 2007.

On August 17, 2007, Luke helps close friend Noah adjust his tie. Their eyes meet. Without warning, and in close-up, the two young men kiss full on the lips. The five-second kiss between Luke and Noah made history as the first gay male kiss on American daytime television. The guy-on-guy kiss "sizzled screens across America and sent the Internet into a tizzy". Fans of the soap opera were divided on whether the kiss was a step forward or a sign of national moral decay. The kiss has been described as legendary, and, in 2008, it was one of the most viewed videos in the history of YouTube, with over 1 million views. It has currently been viewed more than 2 million times.

Not long after the kiss, TV Guide named the couple one of soap opera's best supercouples, and Entertainment Weekly listed their kiss as one of the Landmark moments in Gay Hollywood, later titling the pairing as one of the greatest supercouples in the genre's history.

More than six months after the kiss, Luke and Noah had "overcome Noah's sexual confusion and his stern, homophobic father, who shot Luke on a camping trip, temporarily confining him to a wheelchair. Noah nursed Luke back to health and helped him get back on his feet again. From there, their affection for each other blossomed."

When Luke and Noah's love story began, the ratings for As the World Turns rose considerably. The serial was near the bottom of the ratings competition in 2007, but began to regularly rank third behind The Young and the Restless and The Bold and the Beautiful in the daytime Nielsens. This vastly contrasts from 1989, when As the World Turns sent a gay character away after protests from religious groups. "I don't see it as that big a deal," Hansis stated. "I was just stoked to get a steady job as an actor." "There aren't many gay characters on daytime," Silbermann said. "It means a lot to know that this story is part of something."

==== YouTube and influence on other countries ====
In large part due to the internet, both actors have received mail from viewers in countries that do not air As the World Turns. "YouTube now hosts a version of the Luke and Noah storyline that is edited by fans. In countries where it may not be OK to be gay, people hungry to see themselves accurately portrayed onscreen can go to YouTube and follow the 'Nuke' storyline in sequence," stated David Alexander Nahmod of Bay Area Reporter.

"Some producers balk at having their material posted at free sites like YouTube," Nahmod added. "Producers of the former NBC soap Passions, [which later aired on DirecTV's The 101 as a subscription-only service], pulled its episodes off of YouTube. Likewise, episodes of British soap Coronation Street were also pulled from YouTube." CBS, however, is content in letting the Luke and Noah love story stay on the file sharing sites because it is good and free publicity for the show. "Many gay viewers, for example, who are introduced to the Luke and Noah storyline on the internet may become interested in the whole show and start tuning into the CBS broadcasts. CBS also offers its own online broadcast of the show and www.CBS.com/daytime/ATWT." Lisa Lugassy, press representative for As the World Turns, however, cited that [they] prefer people to watch the CBS airings. "It's the CBS audience, and not the online viewers, who give us our ratings," she said.

Hansis and Silbermann have acknowledged that they would like to do other acting projects when time permits, but that they are happy and content with the jobs they have now. "I hope to be playing Luke for a long, long time to come," said Hansis.

=== Controversy and praise ===
==== Kiss debate, campaign and the media attention ====
Months after Luke and Noah's first kiss made national press, as well as their additional second kiss, the couple's time together was drastically reduced by the series. This was changed again when they were allowed to spend more onscreen time in each other's company but with an alteration; this alteration had the pairing no longer seen kissing onscreen. Any intimate interaction that took place onscreen between the couple was now showcased in the form of hugs, longing stares, talks and cut-away kisses (kisses that viewers do not see but almost get a glimpse of as the camera pans away or cuts to another scene). Frustrated, fans of the pairing organized what they called the "Kiss Campaign", in hopes to coax CBS and Procter & Gamble Productions into giving Luke and Noah another onscreen kiss.

"Soaps, like all businesses, live and die by consumer response to a product," campaign founder Jerome wrote at AfterElton.com. "And while email complaint letters certainly get noticed, it's the more-grandiose gestures that usually succeed in eliciting a response." In a different campaign, Jerome was responsible for the decision to have fans of the television series Jericho send thousands of nuts to network executives in order to get the once-canceled show back on the air, and advised Luke-Noah supporters to flood CBS Daytime Programs Senior Vice President Barbara Bloom with Hershey's Kisses. "The symbolism," Jerome noted, "is obvious."

Acknowledgment of the kiss campaign soon reached prominent media outlets such as The Boston Globe and the Associated Press. Boston Globe reporter Joanna Weiss began her report of the campaign by stating, "Once upon a time, in the melodramatic environs of CBS's As the World Turns, there was a boy named Luke and another boy named Noah, and they fell in love. They shared in self-discovery, made it through a trying time when Luke was paralyzed from the waist down, celebrated his miraculous recovery, and kissed onscreen. Twice. Then they stopped kissing. And some fans were happy. And some fans got very, very angry." Addressed was that fans of the romance, referred to as Luke-and-Noah champions by Boston Globe, pointed to two major near-misses since the couple's two onscreen kisses. Once, during an episode of the soap opera near Christmas, Luke and Noah moved toward a kiss, and the camera quickly panned to a mistletoe, an event dubbed "Mistletoegate" by frustrated and disappointed fans. Then, on a "very special" Valentine's Day episode, every other couple on the show shared a kiss while Luke and Noah hugged.

Boston Globe relayed that AfterElton.com created a running ticker of the time that had elapsed since Luke and Noah last kissed on the lips onscreen. At press time, it was 157 days and running. Also noted was Luke-and-Noah supporters having launched a publicity drive. During the drive, they "blitzed" reporters with long, heartfelt statements about their feelings for the pairing. "We appreciate so much that the show is doing this," stated George Hinds, a youth employment counselor in Cambridge who helps run the fansite lukeandnoahfans.com. Hinds praised As the World Turns for airing a gay kiss within American daytime television. "The campaign is really here to let them know we think it's time to move forward. We think America can handle it."

Despite supporters of the Luke and Noah storyline, the producers of the series felt that showing a same-sex love story was a sensitive subject to show. "We're trying to make a show that appeals to our entire audience," said Jeannie Tharrington, a spokeswoman for Procter & Gamble Productions, which produces the series. Tharrington said that she had been receiving complaints and applause from all sides since Luke and Noah's romance first began. The recent changes, she voiced, were implemented "because of some of the feedback that [they'd] gotten, and because of what [they] thought was best for the show creatively."

Boston Globe detailed that gay characters on television are common by now, "both on cable and on network shows such as ABC's hit drama Brothers and Sisters". They noted that Luke and Noah "follow in a long tradition of daytime soap characters with coming-out stories and with daytime talk show hosts such as Rosie O'Donnell and Ellen DeGeneres, both openly gay, having attracted broad fan bases".

Within the series, Luke and Noah had talked about love, and had conversations about when they would first have sex. All this, combined with their very occasional kisses, made Luke and Noah representative of a new aspect within the soap opera world. "This was one more programming frontier," said Andy Towle, who runs the popular gay-theme blog towleroad.com and keeps readers up to date on Luke and Noah developments.

Luke's story of coming to terms with his sexuality began in late 2005, as the son of one of the show's longstanding couples, Holden Snyder and Lily Walsh. Bloom, CBS's senior vice president for daytime television, said the show's executive producer and head writer laid out a tentative long-term plotline in advance, unfolding it slowly so that the audience would conclude that Luke was gay before he officially announced it. From the start, she made clear, the writers hoped Luke would go on to become a central character, with everything that entails: "It's daytime television. It's the love story business."

Luke's coming-out story garnered praise in the gay community and an award from the gay-rights group Gay & Lesbian Alliance Against Defamation (GLAAD). Hansis and the actress who portrayed his mother (Martha Byrne) appeared in public service announcements on CBS. Tharrington said that due to Luke's storyline being successful, the writers eventually added Noah. "Everyone in the town came to accept Luke as he was, and the viewers did, too," she elaborated. "What we kept hearing from viewers is, 'We love Luke. We want him to have a love interest, too.'"

In 2008, Luke and Noah's story drew another GLAAD award nomination for the series. The storyline has often attracted gay men, who follow the show with "a mix of activist pride and love-struck glee". Luke and Noah clips on YouTube "have been edited from the episodes down to the relevant scenes". Hinds said he had started to watch the soap opera in its entirety, "because [he] just wanted the show to be successful — to support the storyline".

Though the Luke and Noah romance garnered positive reaction, Tharrington and CBS officials said they heard complaints from viewers opposed to the storyline. They would not say which side draws a bigger response. The American Family Association, a conservative group based in Tupelo, Mississippi, had received hundreds of complaints about the Luke and Noah romance — particularly their kisses, said Randy Sharp, the group's spokesman. "It was a big turnoff for them," Sharp said. "The word 'repulsive' was used once or twice. 'Offensive' was used more than once.... It was overtly gratuitous. It's not necessary to the storyline itself."

In 2004, Sharp's group supported a boycott of Procter & Gamble. They complained about some of its gay-friendly corporate policies. With the Luke and Noah story, Sharp detailed that group leaders had a phone conference with Procter & Gamble officials and asked members to contact the company. "Our request to them was to do away with the homosexual characters," he cited. "Your writers can come up with good storylines that the general public would watch and not be offended by."

In contrast to Sharp's views, Hinds felt that the show's approach of implied kisses without showing them was likely not pleasing anyone. "Conservative fans," he pointed out, "still see the intimacy."

Despite the protests against the Luke and Noah pairing, Bloom stated that support for it had been solid. "We have never in any way asked them to censor that story or pull it back," she said. There are signs that, overall, the story has been good for As the World Turns, Bloom further relayed. Over the course of Luke's saga, Bloom noted, the show had moved into a solid position as the third-rated soap across all networks.

Though Bloom and Tharrington insisted that the series would continue the Luke and Noah love story, they made no promises in regards to it. Drawn-out love stories, Bloom pointed out, are a daytime drama staple. "In the soap-opera business, you walk a very fine line between love stories, happily-ever-after, yearning, and obstacles," Bloom cited. "The drama comes from the quest."

On March 2, 2008, David Bauder of the Associated Press put out an article regarding the controversy over Luke and Noah's non-kisses. "The love affair between two young men on the venerable CBS soap opera As the World Turns has triggered a protest campaign by angry viewers," the report opened with. "It's just not the sort of protest you'd expect," stated Bauder. "Fans of the fictional romance between Luke Snyder and Noah Mayer are baffled about why the two characters haven't kissed on-screen since September, wondering whether it's a sign of squeamishness by CBS or show sponsors Procter & Gamble Co."

"We totally support this show and applaud the show for doing this storyline," said Roger Newcomb, a computer worker from New York's northern suburbs and the man behind the campaign. "We just don't understand why they have to be censored or treated differently." Newcomb found it unrealistic that Luke and Noah had not been shown kissing onscreen since their first kiss.

Tharrington assured that there was/is no kissing ban on Luke and Noah, although she would not say what would happen in future shows. She described the mistletoe shot as a "creative decision". "It's always hard to please a diverse audience," Tharrington added, "and we have a diverse audience." One fan had recalled reading a handful of letters in soap opera publications after Luke and Noah's first kiss along the lines of "I don't care if Luke is gay, but I don't want to see it." Bloom stated that there was a "minimal" negative reaction from viewers about the storyline. Despite this, she could not clarify what "minimal" meant in this case. There had been no organized campaign by conservative or parent advocacy groups that monitor television content. "It's entirely new to me," said Tim Winter, president of the Parents Television Council. "I hadn't heard anything about it."

The American Family Association website took a "take-action alert" against Procter & Gamble. They called the company the "top pro-homosexual sponsor on television". The group came to its conclusion based on the number of Procter & Gamble products advertised on primetime television shows with gay or lesbian characters. As the World Turns were not mentioned.

One viewer along with Newcomb were more bothered by other things they had seen on the soap opera. They cited that a 14-year-old boy shot a man who was attacking his mother in 2008, and that "one character was so desperate for a baby that she slept with her ex-brother-in-law and was nearly caught having sex in an elevator. Another woman, they said, led her children and ex-husband into believing she had a brain tumor just to get him back". They felt that these incidents within the series were more offensive than two men kissing, and that the show should not have gone through with the Luke and Noah storyline if they were not going to finish it.

A complicated factor to the Luke and Noah controversy is the couple's popularity. At the time, some 140 scenes featuring the two were posted online, a number that has since grown. The message board on Vanhansis.net gets posts from around the world. While competitors One Life to Live and Days of Our Lives saw double-digit drops in viewership over the past year, As the World Turns was down only 2 percent.

Speculated was that the show's producers wanted and still want it "both ways" — to get credit for having a gay couple but no backlash from long-term viewers for showing intimacy, relayed Carolyn Hinsey, editor of Soap Opera Weekly. Despite the speculation, Bloom stated that she would like to see Luke and Noah's romance continue. "If that means there is a natural progression to the physical relationship, I would be in support of it," she said.

Tharrington laughed when asked about any behind-the-scenes debates over showing intimacy between the two men. "You wouldn't even believe," she told Associated Press. Producers are committed to telling the story of the romance, she added, stating that she hoped the audience would recognize what As the World Turns is showing, instead of just what it is not: "We feel like we're doing so much right here. We're telling a story that no one else is doing. We're telling a story that has really engaged our audience."

Within hours, all other news outlets such as CNN and FOX NEWS reported the Associated Press article, as debate about the no-kiss controversy became evident across the internet.

On April 23, 2008, the two men kissed again for the third time onscreen, after months of campaigning from relentless fans of the couple. Washington Blade stated:

After 214 days and an e-mail campaign by angry fans that generated international coverage, the gay teen couple on CBS soap opera As The World Turns finally got to share their third on-screen kiss. During the episode that aired April 23, Luke (Van Hansis), and Noah (Jake Silbermann) went shopping for the birthday of a woman Noah married so she could get a green card. As they finished their shopping they pulled closely together and shared a series of quick, passionate kisses.

Following Luke and Noah's third kiss, the show slowly allowed more and more physical intimacy between the two. Throughout the month of August 2008, every episode featuring Luke and Noah also included at least one kiss.

=== Consummation Clock ===
A debate regarding whether or not Luke and Noah would be allowed a sex scene led AfterElton.com to change their "LipLock Clock" to a "Consummation Clock" which counted how many days the couple had gone without having sex. This was done to try and persuade the producers and writers to portray their relationship with the same freedoms as they would a heterosexual couple. On January 12, 2009, the clock stopped when the couple finally consummated their relationship; they had sex for the first time, which pleased a significant portion of the audience. However, the love scene was not shown onscreen. TV Guide columnist Michael Logan said that the lack of promotion for the sex scene may have been a deliberate strategy to avoid giving protesters a chance to pressure the network from cutting the storyline. "Are they being savvy or scared?" he said. "I don’t know." In addition, Logan commented on how long it took the series to have the two become physically intimate with each other. "It was getting goofy-ridiculous how long it took," said Logan. "But it happened. It’s historic, I guess."

== Criticism ==
=== Airtime ===
Gay and Lesbian Times reported receiving 20 letters from fans complaining about Luke and Noah's lack of airtime as a couple. In June and April, Luke and Noah were showcased in a total of seven episodes, which caused an uproar. Fans began campaigning in various ways in hopes of getting the couple featured more.

In contrast to the usual praise for the couple's campaigns, the Gay and Lesbian Times criticized fans of the couple on September 4, 2008, for their campaign efforts. They called it unbelievable that people counted the number of episodes Luke and Noah appeared in and shared together and that it would be "easy to laugh at the trivial nature of the fans concerns" if not for "the state of all nonfiction (read: real) gay, lesbian, bisexual and transgender people nationwide and internationally". Gay and Lesbian Times stated that there are more important things in life than the romance of two soap opera characters.

At the time, Luke and Noah had appeared in only 12 of 60 episodes and shared "a scant 36 minutes together" onscreen; the heterosexual couples had been sexually intimate 23 times onscreen, but not Luke and Noah.

== See also ==
- List of supercouples
- Reid Oliver
