= Cody Horn =

American actress

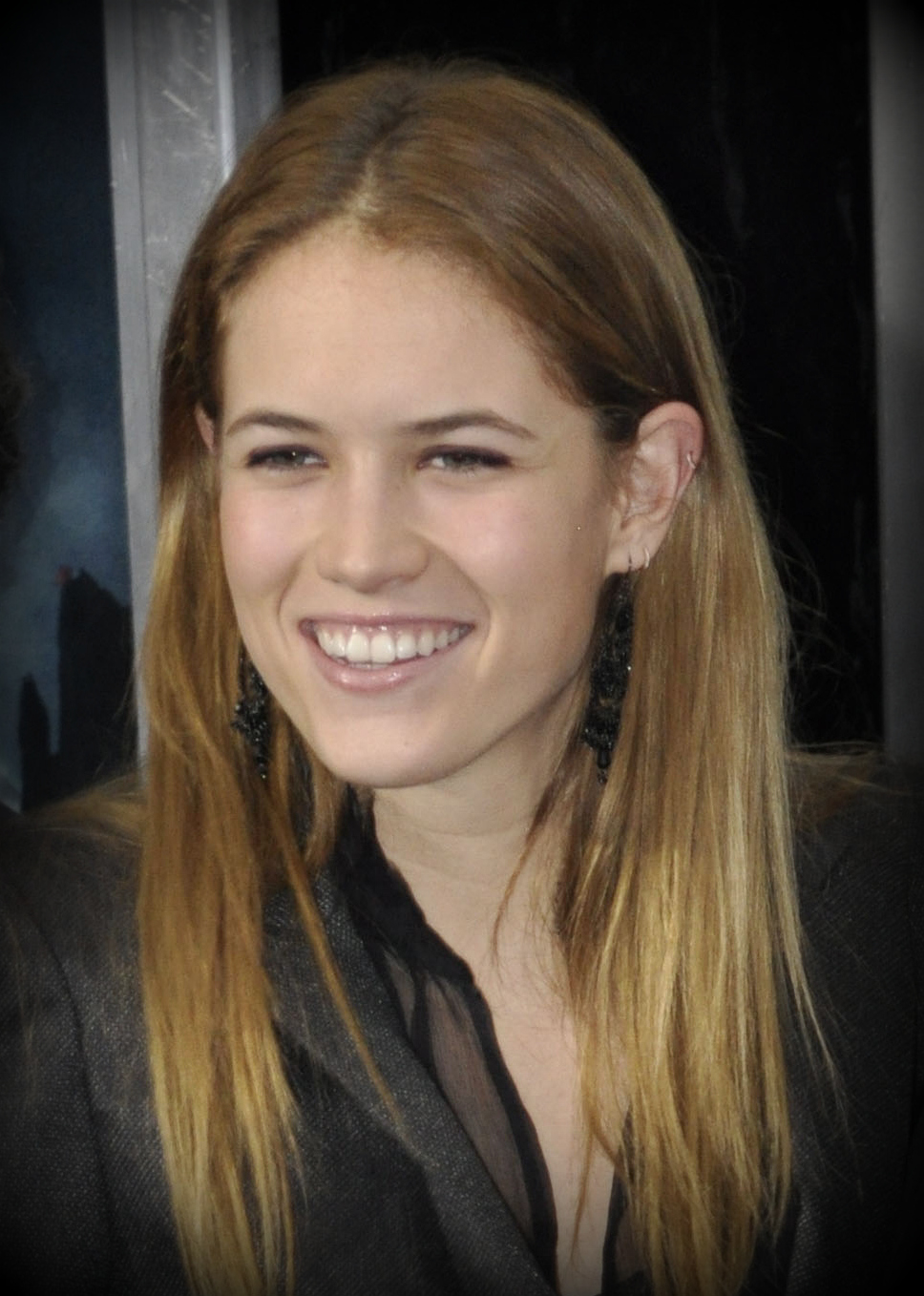
- Horn in November 2010
- Born: June 12, 1988 (age 38); Los Angeles, California, U.S.
- Occupation: Actress
- Years active: 2010–present
- Father: Alan F. Horn

Cody Horn is an American actress. She has appeared in films such as Violet & Daisy (2011), Magic Mike (2012), and End of Watch (2012), and guest starred on the NBC sitcom The Office as recurring character Jordan Garfield (2011). As of 2024, she has set up Cadence Kitchen, an educational cooking program.

== Life and career ==
Horn was born in Los Angeles and is the daughter of Cindy Horn (née Harrell), a former model and actress, and Alan F. Horn, an entertainment executive and former chairman of Walt Disney Studios. She went to Harvard-Westlake School and graduated in 2006. She has appeared on Rescue Me and guest starred on three episodes of The Office. She also played Lynetta Loski in the 2010 movie Flipped, and she starred as Michelle in the James Wan-produced horror thriller film Demonic.

Horn appeared in the film Magic Mike (2012).

== Filmography ==
=== Film ===
Year	Film	Role	Notes
2010	Flipped	Lynetta Loski	
2010	Twelve	Alyssa	
2010	Dead Hands	Sophie	Short film
2010	Occupant	Sharleen	
2011	Violet & Daisy	Barbie Sunday	
2012	Magic Mike	Brooke	
2012	End of Watch	Police Officer Davis	
2014	Worst Friends	Lily	
2015	Demonic	Michelle	
2015	Burning Bodhi	Ember	
2017	A Change of Heart	Teddy	
2018	Ask for Jane	Janice	

=== Television ===
Year	Film	Role	Notes
2010	Rescue Me	Emily	7 episodes
2011	White Collar	Brooke	Episode: "Power Play"
2011	The Office	Jordan Garfield	3 episodes
