= House of Pain discography =

Band discography

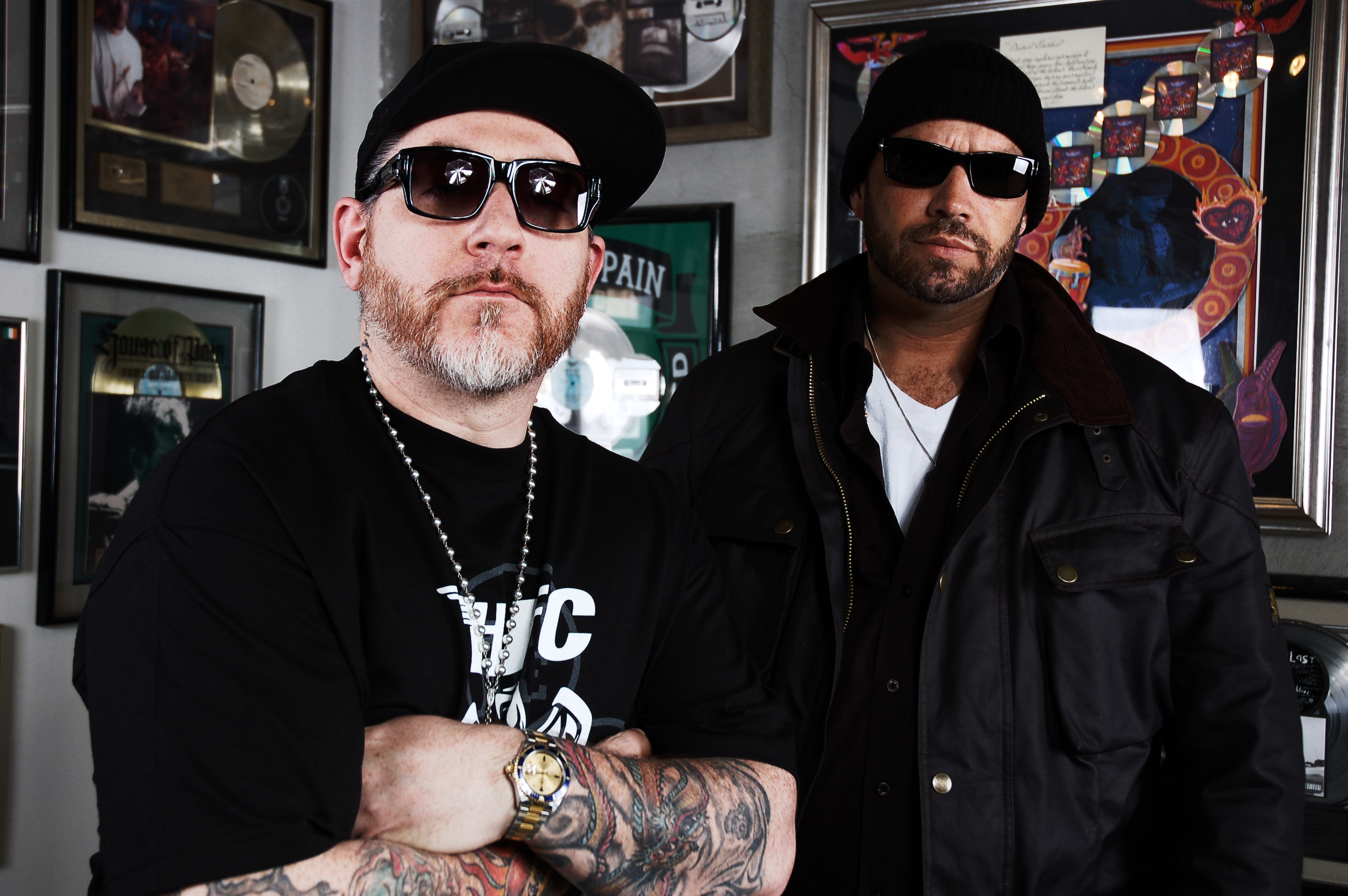
- Studio albums: 3
- Extended plays: 1
- Compilation albums: 1
- Singles: 8

The discography of American rap group House of Pain consists of three studio albums, one compilation album, one extended play and eight singles.

== Albums ==
=== Studio albums ===
List of studio albums, with selected chart positions and certifications
Title	Album details	Peak chart positions							Certifications
Title	Album details	US	US R&B	AUS	GER	NLD	NZ	UK	Certifications
House of Pain	Released: July 21, 1992 (US); Labels: Tommy Boy, Warner Bros.; Formats: CD, LP, digital download	14	16	91	61	47	35	73	RIAA: Platinum
Same as It Ever Was	Released: June 28, 1994 (US); Labels: Tommy Boy, Warner Bros.; Formats: CD, LP, digital download	12	12	97	24	34	14	8	RIAA: Gold
Truth Crushed to Earth Shall Rise Again	Released: October 22, 1996 (US); Label: Tommy Boy, Warner Bros.; Formats: CD, LP, digital download	47	31	—	—	69	—	147	
"—" denotes a recording that did not chart or was not released in that territory.

=== Extended plays ===
Year	Album
1994	Legend: Released: 1994; Label: Tommy Boy

=== Compilations ===
Year	Album
2004	Shamrocks & Shenanigans: Released: February 10, 2004; Label: Tommy Boy

== Singles ==
List of singles, with selected chart positions and certifications, showing year released and album name
Title	Year	Peak chart positions								Certifications	Album
Title	Year	US	US R&B	US Rap	AUS	CAN	NLD	NZ	UK	Certifications	Album
"Jump Around"	1992	3	14	5	15	45	10	3	8	RIAA: Platinum; ARIA: Gold; BPI: 2× Platinum; RMNZ: 4× Platinum	House of Pain
"Shamrocks and Shenanigans (Boom Shalock Lock Boom)"	1992	65	74	—	81	—	39	18	23		House of Pain
"Who's the Man?"	1993	96	77	—	—	—	—	—	23		Who's the Man? (soundtrack) / Same as It Ever Was
"On Point"	1994	85	103	40	—	—	—	20	19		Same as It Ever Was
"It Ain't a Crime"	1994	—	—	—	—	—	—	—	37		Same as It Ever Was
"Over There Shit"	1995	—	—	—	—	—	—	—	20		Same as It Ever Was
"Fed Up"	1996	—	107	—	—	—	—	45	68		Truth Crushed to Earth Shall Rise Again
"Jump Around" (2000 Mix)	1998	—	114	—	—	20	—	—	—		Non-album single
"—" denotes a recording that did not chart or was not released in that territory.

== Other appearances ==
Year	Song	Album	Notes
1993	Who's the Man?	Who's the Man: soundtrack / Same As It Never Was!	
1993	"Just Another Victim"	Judgment Night: soundtrack	with Helmet
1995	"Beef Jerky"	Jerky Boys: soundtrack	
1996	"Punch Drunk"	Eddie: soundtrack	
