= Shamrocks & Shenanigans =

Greatest hits album by House of Pain
- Released: February 10, 2004
- Recorded: 1989–2000
- Genre: Hip hop
- Length: 1:08:51
- Label: Rhino; Tommy Boy; Warner Bros.
- Producer: Bilal Bashir; Dante Ross; Diamond D; DJ Muggs; Helmet; House of Pain; John Gamble; Scheme Team Productions; QD3

Everlast chronology
Shamrocks & Shenanigans (2004)	The Life Acoustic (2013)

Professional ratings
Review scores
Source	Rating
AllMusic	4/5 stars
The Encyclopedia of Popular Music	4/5 stars
RapReviews	6/10

Shamrocks & Shenanigans – The Best of House of Pain and Everlast is a best-of compilation album by American hip hop trio House of Pain including solo material recorded by the group's frontman Everlast. It was released on February 10, 2004, through Tommy Boy Records, Rhino Entertainment and Warner Records. Production was handled by DJ Muggs, Dante Ross, John Gamble, Bilal Bashir, Diamond D, Helmet, Scheme Team Productions, Quincy Jones III and House of Pain. It features guest appearances from Cokni O'Dire, Diamond D, Divine Styler, Donald D, Helmet, Ice-T and N'Dea Davenport.

The album is compiled of three songs from Everlast's 1990 debut studio album Forever Everlasting, four songs from House of Pain's 1992 debut studio album Fine Malt Lyrics, a song from 1993 Who's the Man? Original Motion Picture Soundtrack, a song from 1993 Music From the Motion Picture Judgment Night, three songs from House of Pain's 1994 second studio album Same As It Ever Was, a song from 1996 Eddie: The Soundtrack, a song from House of Pain's 1996 third and final studio album Truth Crushed to Earth Shall Rise Again, two songs from Everlast's 1998 second studio album Whitey Ford Sings the Blues, and a song from Everlast's 2000 third studio album Eat at Whitey's.

== Track listing ==
Shamrocks & Shenanigans
No.	Title	Writer(s)	Producer(s)	Length
1.	"Jump Around" (House of Pain)	Erik Schrody; Lawrence Muggerud	DJ Muggs	3:35
2.	"Shamrocks and Shenanigans (Boom Shalock Lock Boom)" (House of Pain)	Schrody; Danny O'Connor; Leor DiMant	DJ Lethal	3:39
3.	"What It's Like" (Everlast)	Schrody	Everlast; Dante Ross; John Gamble	5:04
4.	"Who's the Man" (House of Pain)	Schrody; O'Connor; DiMant; Wilson Beckett; Kevin Bell; Ronald Bell; Peter Duarte; Kevin Lassiter; Dennis White; Ray Wright	DJ Lethal	4:04
5.	"Black Jesus" (Everlast)	Schrody	Everlast; Dante Ross; John Gamble	4:22
6.	"Same as It Ever Was" (House of Pain)	Schrody; O'Connor; Muggerud	DJ Muggs	3:28
7.	"Punch Drunk" (House of Pain)	Schrody; O'Connor; Jimmy Castor	Scheme Team Productions	3:11
8.	"Put on Your Shit Kickers" (House of Pain)	Schrody; Muggerud	DJ Muggs	4:25
9.	"Ends" (Everlast)	Schrody; Dante Ross	Everlast; Dante Ross; John Gamble	4:57
10.	"Just Another Victim" (House of Pain and Helmet)	Everlast; Henry Bogdan; DiMant	Helmet; House of Pain	4:22
11.	"Pass the Jinn" (House of Pain featuring Cokni O'Dire & Divine Styler)	Schrody; DiMant	DJ Lethal; Everlast	3:47
12.	"Jump Around (Pete Rock Remix)" (House of Pain)	Schrody; Muggerud	DJ Muggs	4:02
13.	"On Point" (House of Pain)	Schrody; DiMant	DJ Lethal	3:36
14.	"Word Is Bond" (House of Pain featuring Diamond D)	Schrody	Diamond D	4:11
15.	"I Got the Knack" (Everlast)	Schrody; Quincy Jones III; Bilal Bashir	QDIII	4:23
16.	"Never Missin' a Beat" (Everlast)	Schrody; Bashir; George Clinton; Roger Troutman; Larry Troutman	Bilal Bashir	4:16
17.	"The Rhythm" (Everlast featuring Ice-T, Donald D & Diva)	Schrody	Bilal Bashir	4:28
Total length:				1:08:51
