= Legend (House of Pain EP) =

Single by House of Pain
- B-side: "Word Is Bond"
- Released: 1994
- Genre: Hardcore hip hop
- Length: 20:45
- Label: Tommy Boy; XL
- Songwriter(s): Erik Schrody; Leor Dimant
- Producer(s): DJ Lethal

House of Pain singles chronology
"It Ain't a Crime" (1994)	"Legend" (1994)	"Over There (I Don't Care)" (1995)

Music video
- "Legend" on YouTube

"Legend" is a song by American hardcore hip hop trio House of Pain, written by members Everlast and DJ Lethal, and released in 1994. Production was handled by Lethal, with DJ Muggs serving as executive producer.

The song first appeared on the UK only 12" single "It Ain't a Crime", which was released through XL Recordings. It was released as a maxi-single via Tommy Boy Records following-up aforementioned "It Ain't a Crime".

Alternative Press magazine editor described the song as it "recreates the rap/metal feel of the "Shamrocks And Shenanigans" remix, but with a darker edge".

Despite the music video being directed for the song, "Legend" was missing from the final cut of the group's second studio full-length album Same as It Ever Was.

== Track listing ==
CD Maxi-Single (TBXCD 643)
No.	Title	Writer(s)	Producer(s)	Length
1.	"Legend (Lethal Dose Remix)"	Erik Schrody; Leor Dimant	DJ Lethal; DJ Muggs (exec.)	4:10
2.	"Legend (Extended Mix)"	Schrody; Dimant	DJ Lethal; DJ Muggs (exec.)	5:15
3.	"Word Is Bond (Remix)"	Schrody; Joseph Kirkland	Diamond D	3:35
4.	"It Ain't a Crime (UK Remix)"	Schrody; Dimant; Anthony Kiedis; Michael Peter Balzary; John Frusciante; Chad Smith	DJ Muggs; DJ Lethal (co.); DJ Tom LaRoc (add.); Bobby La Serra (add.)	4:09
5.	"Word Is Bond (Remix Instrumental)"	Schrody; Kirkland	Diamond D	3:36
Total length:				20:45

Sample credits

- Track 3 contains a sample of "River's Invitation" performed by Freddie Robinson and "Death Becomes You" performed by Pete Rock & CL Smooth.
- Track 4 contains a sample of "Under the Bridge" performed by Red Hot Chili Peppers.

== Personnel ==
- Erik "Everlast" Schrody – vocals
- Leor "DJ Lethal" Dimant – producer & mixing (tracks: 1, 2), co-producer (track 4)
- Michael Frenke – engineering (tracks: 1, 2, 4)
- Lawrence "DJ Muggs" Muggerud – producer & mixing (track 4), executive producer (tracks: 1, 2)
- Joseph "Diamond D" Kirkland – producer & mixing (track 3)
- Bobby La Serra – additional producer & additional re-mixing (track 4)
- DJ Tom LaRoc – additional producer & additional re-mixing (track 4)
- L.A. – engineering (track 4)
- Madhouse – re-mixing (track 4)
- Erwin Gorostiza – art direction
- Jason Rand – design
- Kenton Parker – logo design
- Brian Cross – photography
- Isa Brito – photography
