= Shamrocks and Shenanigans =

Shamrocks and Shenanigans may refer to:

- "Shamrocks and Shenanigans (Boom Shalock Lock Boom)", a 1992 single by House of Pain
- Shamrocks & Shenanigans, a 2004 compilation album by House of Pain and Everlast
