= On Point (House of Pain song) =

1994 single by House of Pain

Single by House of Pain

from the album Same as It Ever Was
- Released: 1994
- Studio: Image Recording Studios
- Genre: Hip hop
- Length: 3:48
- Label: Tommy Boy
- Songwriter(s): Erik Schrody; Leor Dimant
- Producer(s): DJ Lethal

House of Pain singles chronology
"Just Another Victim" (1993)	"On Point" (1994)	"It Ain't a Crime" (1994)

Music video
- "On Point" on YouTube

"On Point" is a song by American hardcore hip hop trio House of Pain. It was released in 1994 through Tommy Boy Records as the lead single from their second studio album, Same as It Ever Was (1994). Recording sessions took place at Image Recording Studios. Production was handled by DJ Lethal. It is the only song to ever feature a rap verse from all the three members of the group. The accompanying music video was directed by Frank Sacramento.

== Composition ==
The song contains horns reminiscent of House of Pain's "Jump Around" in the production and verses from Everlast, Danny Boy and DJ Lethal.

== Critical reception ==
Alternative Press gave a positive review of the song, writing "The old soul records, the swagger, the bravado, the wordplay—it's all here." Nathan Foster of Classic Rock History placed the song at number six in the list "Top 10 House Of Pain Songs". Andy Beevers from Music Week gave it four out of five and named it Pick of the Week in the category of Dance, writing, "'On Point' is a typically loud and brash rap over tough but funky beats from Cypress Hill's Muggs plus The Beatminerz, the latter providing an exclusive UK remix. It is not as infectious as 'Jump Around', but it should still sell well." Brad Beatnik from the Record Mirror Dance Update noted, "The l'm the man rap sounds a little awkward at first but the stripped-down beats and flute (on the Beatminerz Mix) give it a cool laconic vibe. Instrumentals and a more familiar album mix should ensure a healthy reception from clubs and the mainstream." Another RM editor, James Hamilton named it a "well written jaunty gruff rumbling rap jiggler" in his weekly dance column.

== Charts ==
Chart (1994)	Peak position
New Zealand (Recorded Music NZ)	20
UK Singles (OCC)	19
UK Dance (OCC)	17
US Billboard Hot 100	85
US Hot R&B/Hip-Hop Songs (Billboard)	103
US Hot Rap Songs (Billboard)	40
