= Kay Gees =

American musical group, active from 1974 to 1978

The Kay-Gees
- Genres: Jazz; Funk; Soul; Disco
- Years active: 1974–1979
- Labels: Gang Records, De-Lite
- Past members: Kevin "Amir Bayyan" Bell; Callie Cheek; Dennis White; Kevin Lassiter; Michael Cheek; Peter Duarte; Ray Wright; Wilson Becket

The Kay-Gees were an American funk and disco group during the 1970s, protégés of Kool & the Gang. The group featured Amir Bayyan (Kevin Bell), younger brother to Kool & the Gang's Robert "Kool" Bell and Ronald Bell (Khalis Bayyan), who subsequently joined his brothers in Kool & the Gang, as well as Kevin Lassiter, Michael Cheek, Callie Cheek, Dennis White, Glen Griffin, Fernando Arocho, Greg Radford, Huey Harris, Ibrahim (Peter) Duarte, Ray Wright and Wilson Becket.

== Legacy ==
In 1988, the Kay-Gees' 1974 song "Who's the Man (With the Master Plan)" was sampled by Big Daddy Kane for his album Long Live the Kane; Also in 1992, Dr. Dre sampled the song for his hip hop album, The Chronic. The same year, House of Pain sampled the song in the chorus of their own version of the song, released the next year under the same name (but without the sub-name) and featured on the soundtrack of the 1993 film of the same name. In 2005, their song "Heavenly Dream" was sampled by hip-hop artist Kanye West, for his second album, Late Registration.

== Discography ==
- Keep On Bumpin' & Masterplan (1974) U.S. #199
- Find a Friend (1976)
- Kilowatt (1977)
- Burn Me Up (1979)
