= On Point (disambiguation) =

On Point is an American public radio show.

On Point or OnPoint may also refer to:

- "On Point" (House of Pain song), 1994
- "On Point" (KSI song), 2018
- On Point Motorsports, an American professional stock car racing team
- OnPoint, a webcast produced by Environment & Energy Publishing
- OnPoint NYC, a New York City nonprofit that operates safe injection sites
- Take point, or to be on point, a military term

== See also ==
- En pointe, a ballet term
