= Old Town Bar and Restaurant =

Establishment in Manhattan, New York

Coordinates: 40°44′15.05″N 73°59′21.18″W

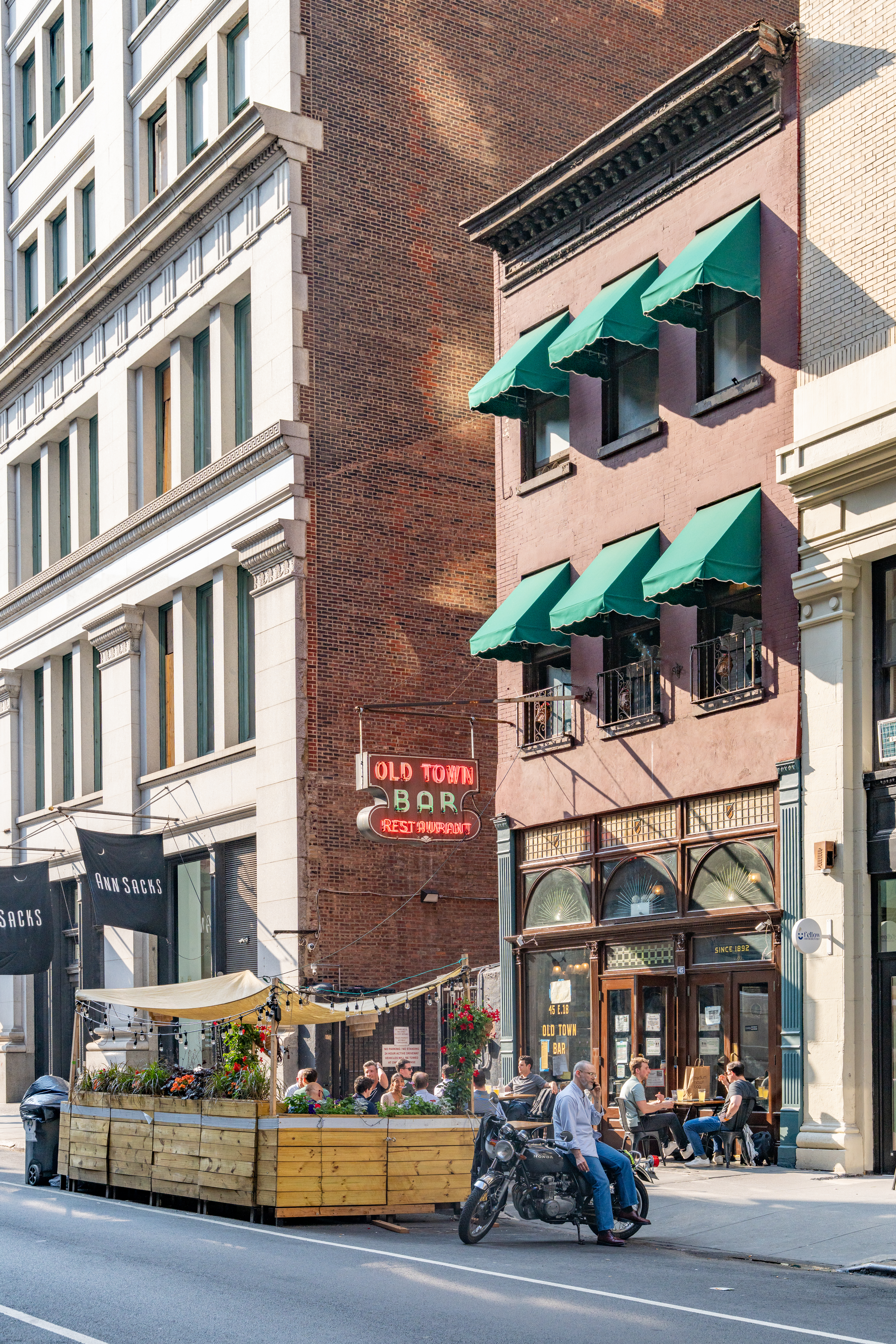
Street Front (2025)

The Old Town Bar and Restaurant is a bar and restaurant located between Park Avenue and Broadway at 45 East 18th Street in the Flatiron District, Manhattan in New York City, one block north of Union Square.

Originally 45 East 18th Street was constructed in 1901, but the business was started, at 43 E. 18th St., in 1892, by Jacob Burckel, whose name is on the 1896 license behind the bar. Harry W. Viemeister, a saloon and restaurant owner in New York from as early as 1894, moved to 45 E. 18th St. in 1912. As the bar has been in continuous operation since 1901, this makes it one of the oldest bars in the New York City area.

During Prohibition, the 45 E. 18th St. Bar changed its name to Craig's Restaurant and started serving food in order to operate as a speakeasy.

In 1933, 45 E. 18th St., the German-American Lohdens, bought the bar, changing the name to the Old Town Bar, and the neon sign was erected, in 1937.

After the end of Prohibition and the closing of the nearby 18th Street Subway station on 8 November 1948, the bar began to fall into disrepair. In the late 1960s, Irish-American Larry Meagher offered to manage and took over operations, opened the bar in the evenings and began to serve food, and the bar saw a resurgence of popularity. In the 1990s, Larry Meagher inherited the bar and the building from Henry Lohden. Meagher also died, leaving management of the Old Town to his children and now Gerard Meagher is manager and co-owner.

The Old Town Bar has managed to preserve a lot of its original fixtures which date back to the 19th century. The bar itself is 55 feet long and made of marble and mahogany. The ceiling, made of "tin" (actually pressed steel tiles), is 16 feet high. Other original furnishings include large beveled mirrors, antique cash registers, wooden booths, and New York's oldest dumbwaiter that ferries food orders from the upstairs kitchen down to the bar. Another notable feature is the row of old floor-length 1910 Hinsdale urinals in the first floor Men's room. A creaky wooden staircase (also original) leads to an upstairs dining area, which was closed for several years before being reopened in the 1970s to cater to an unexpected increase in patrons coming to the bar on their lunch break.

Several music artists and Hollywood directors have used the Old Town as a backdrop for their music video productions and movie scenes, including rap group House of Pain for a music video for their 1992 single "Jump Around", and director Whit Stillman for his 1998 feature film The Last Days of Disco. It also appeared in the films The Devil's Own (1997), State of Grace (1990), Q & A (1990), Bullets over Broadway (1994), and Madonna's 1993 "Bad Girl" video. The bar also appeared in the television shows, Sex and the City, Mad About You, The Marvelous Mrs. Maisel and in the opening montage of Late Night with David Letterman from 1987 to 1992. The exterior was used in the television sitcom "Mad About You" to represent the fictional establishment "Riffs" in the show.
