= Hittin' Switches =

Single by Erick Sermon

from the album Who's the Man?: Original Motion Picture Soundtrack and No Pressure
- Released: May 4, 1993
- Genre: East Coast hip hop; hardcore hip hop
- Length: 3:55
- Label: Uptown
- Lyricist(s): Erick Sermon
- Producer(s): Erick Sermon

Erick Sermon singles chronology
"Hittin' Switches" (1993)	"Stay Real" (1993)

Who's the Man?: Original Motion Picture Soundtrack singles chronology
"Let's Go Through the Motions" (1993)	"Hittin' Switches" (1993)	"Who's the Man?" (1993)

Music video
- "Hittin' Switches" on YouTube

"Hittin' Switches" is a hardcore hip hop song written and performed by American rapper Erick Sermon. It was released on May 4, 1993 through Uptown Records as the second single from the original motion picture soundtrack to Ted Demme's film Who's the Man?

The song is Sermon's debut solo single after his split from EPMD and ended up to be the lead single from his debut solo studio album No Pressure.

Production was handled by Sermon himself, with associate producers "Buttnaked" Tim Dawg and James Earl Jones Jr. and executive producers Andre Harrell, Sean "Puffy" Combs and Mark Siegel. An accompanying music video was directed by Hype Williams.

In the United States, the song peaked at number 14 on the Hot Rap Singles chart and number 20 on the Hot Dance Music/Maxi-Singles Sales chart.

== Track listing ==
7" vinyl 45 RPM, 12" vinyl 33 ⅓ RPM, CS
No.	Title	Length
1.	"Hittin' Switches" (radio)	3:55
2.	"Hittin' Switches" (album version)	3:55

== Charts ==
Weekly chart performance for "Hittin' Switches"
Chart (1993)	Peak position
US Hot Rap Singles (Billboard)	14
US Hot Dance Music/Maxi-Singles Sales (Billboard)	20
