= Danny Boy (rapper) =

American rapper and museum director (born 1968)

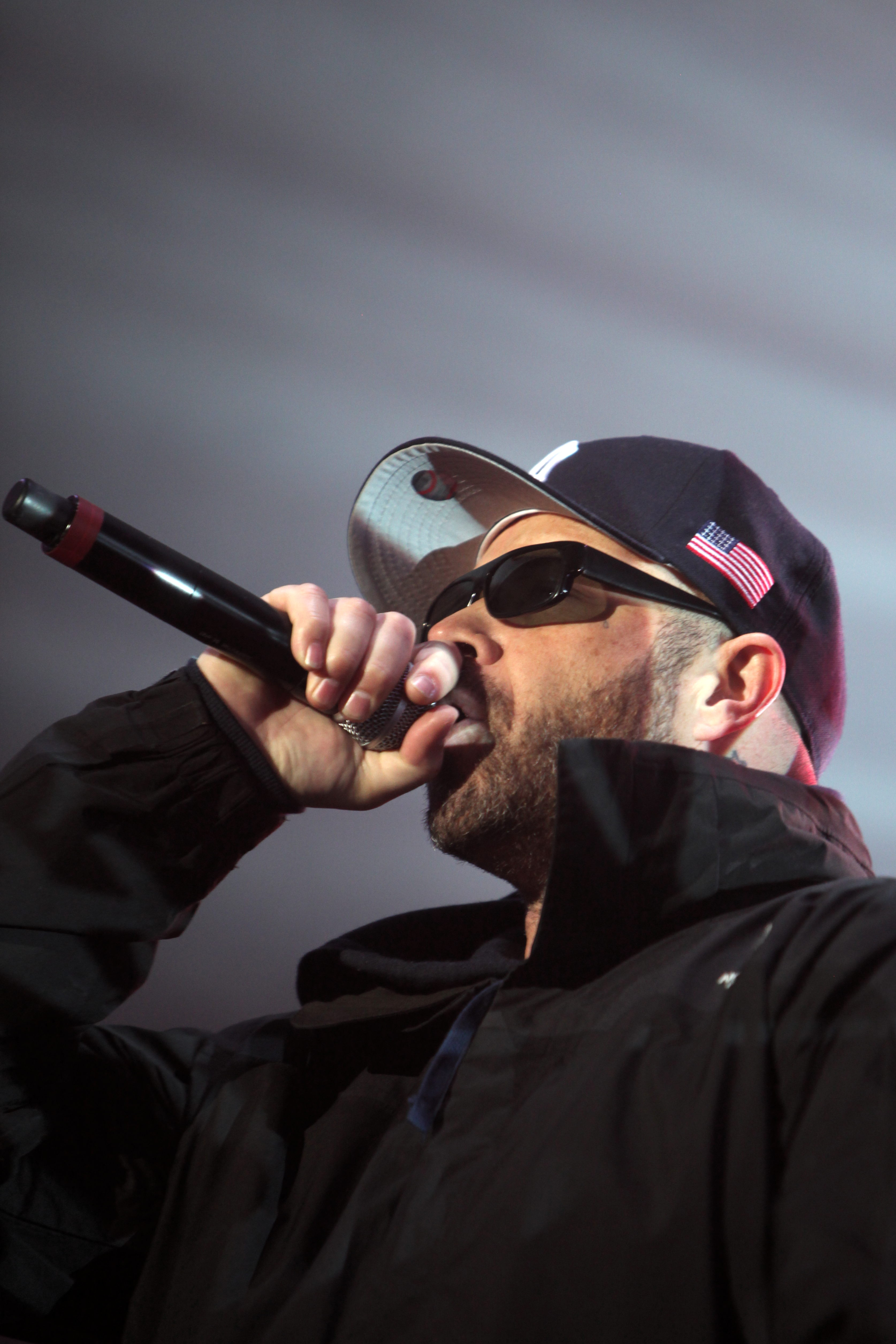
- Danny Boy performing in 2011

Background information
- Born: Daniel O'Connor; December 12, 1968 (age 57); Brooklyn, New York City, U.S.
- Origin: Los Angeles, California, U.S.
- Genres: Hip hop
- Occupations: Rapper; art director; hype man; museum director
- Years active: 1990–present
- Member of: House of Pain; La Coka Nostra

Daniel O'Connor (born December 12, 1968), better known as Danny Boy or Danny Boy O'Connor, is an American rapper, art director, and the executive director of The Outsiders House Museum. O'Connor spent his childhood in New York, before moving to Los Angeles in the 1980s. In the 1990s, O'Connor co-founded the rap group House of Pain, with fellow rapper Erik Schrody (Everlast) and DJ Leor Dimant (DJ Lethal). Based on their cultural heritage they fashioned themselves as rowdy Irish-American hooligans. O'Connor played the role of art director, designing logos, branding, hype man, and co-rapper. In 1992, with the singles "Jump Around" and "Shamrocks and Shenanigans", their self-titled debut album, also known as Fine Malt Lyrics, went platinum.

They followed it up with Same as It Ever Was (1994), which went gold, and Truth Crushed to Earth Shall Rise Again (1996), before they all went their separate ways. O'Connor took part in several music projects, and continued doing designs as freelance work. In 2006, O'Connor founded the rap group La Coka Nostra where he was joined by George Carroll (Slaine), William Braunstein (Ill Bill), Dimant, and Schrody (only for the first album). Together they have three releases: A Brand You Can Trust (2009), Masters of the Dark Arts (2012) and To Thine Own Self Be True (2016).

In 2016, O'Connor, who is a lifelong fan of S. E. Hinton's book The Outsiders and its film adaptation by Francis Ford Coppola, bought the house used in the film located in Tulsa, Oklahoma. He turned it into a museum named The Outsiders House Museum, that contains much of the book and film memorabilia. For his efforts preserving a cultural landmark, he received a key to the city.

== Early life ==
O'Connor was born in Brooklyn, New York City, on December 12, 1968. He explained, that his father was incarcerated when O'Connor was two months old. O'Connor and his mother moved to Los Angeles when he was six. When O'Connor was seventeen, his father, a homeless alcoholic, was murdered by someone who poured gasoline on him to set him on fire. During that time O'Connor was in a gang involved in petty crimes, and he was placed on probation.

== Career ==
=== 1990–1992: Founding House of Pain and breakthrough ===
In 1990, O'Connor got together with fellow rapper Erik Schrody (Everlast) who had just released a rap album called Forever Everlasting (1990), that did not have much success. O'Connor knew Schrody when he went to William Howard Taft High School in Woodland Hills, California (1984–1986), and various hip hop event they attended in their teens. Both of Irish descent, they decided to make a hip hop group with this identity. While hanging out at O'Connor's home, Schrody noticed a cassette with the title House of Pain, which was a demo of a Punk group O'Connor tried to put together. Schrody really liked the name and felt they should re-use as their name. Schrody brought in his former DJ Leor Diamant (DJ Lethal) (who was actually born in Latvia) and House of Pain was created. While in House of Pain, O'Connor acted as the hype man, second emcee, art director and the graphic artist of the group. After they recorded a demo, for which O'Connor designed the cover, that created a bidding war among labels. The label they chose was Tommy Boy Records, who credits O'Connor's art work to have initially caught their attention.

In 1992, they released their debut album House of Pain, subtitled Fine Malt Lyrics. Their first single "Jump Around" was a major hit. In the United States, it peaked at number 3 on the Billboard Hot 100, while reaching number 5 on the Hot Rap Songs, 13 on Rhythmic Top 40, 1 on Hot Dance Music/Maxi-Singles Sales, number 17 on the Billboard Dance Club Songs, and is certified platinum. O'Connor expressed regrets for not doing any writing on Jump Around, for the later royalties it could have provided him. At the 35th Grammy Awards, "Jump Around" got them nominated for Best Rap Performance by a Duo or Group. Their second single "Shamrocks and Shenanigans (Boom Shalock Lock Boom)", it peaked at 65 on the Billboard Hot 100, 75 on the Hot R&B/Hip-Hop Songs, 14 on the Dance Club Songs, and 74 on Radio Songs. The album peaked at 14 on the Billboard 200, 14 on the U.S. Billboard Top Current Albums, 16 on the U.S. Billboard Top R&B/Hip-Hop Albums, 14 on the U.S. Billboard Top Album Sales, and is certified platinum. The album was generally received as good to strong across major outlets. Critics highlighted its swaggering energy and dense, hard-hitting production, praising it as a solid and often exceptional entry in early 1990s hip-hop. Comparisons were drawn to both Licensed to Ill and traditional party-ready rap, but filtered through a working-class, Irish-American lens that gave the record its distinctive character. The consensus recognized its creative moments, accomplished sound, and above-average delivery that set it apart from many peers.

=== 1993–1996: Subsequent success and group's breakup ===
In 1993, O'Connor with his group mates were among the rap artists who had cameo roles in Ted Demme's film Who's the Man?. For this project they provided a theme song by the same name, which was also used as a single for the soundtrack and their subsequent album. It rose to number 97 on the Billboard Hot 100, 77 on the Hot R&B/Hip-Hop Singles & Tracks, and 10 on the US Billboard Hot Dance Music/Maxi-Singles Sales.

In 1994, they released Same as It Ever Was. The album peaked at 12 equally on the Billboard 200, the U.S. Billboard Top Current Albums, the U.S. Billboard Top R&B/Hip-Hop Albums, the U.S. Billboard Top Album Sales, and is certified gold. The second album drew a wider range of reactions than the debut, though the overall reception leaned positive. Some critics praised its progression and stronger sense of direction, with several awarding it four stars and noting its mix of laid-back grooves and driving force. Others found the record hard, compelling, and even among the toughest hip-hop of its year.

Also in 1994, O'Connor acted in Allan Arkush's television film Shake, Rattle and Rock!, part of the Rebel Highway series.

In 1996, they released Truth Crushed to Earth Shall Rise Again. The album peaked at 47 on the Billboard 200, 47 on the U.S. Billboard Top Current Albums, 31 on the U.S. Billboard Top R&B/Hip-Hop Albums, and 47 on the U.S. Billboard Top Album Sales. At the release party, Schrody decided to breakup the group. The third House of Pain album received mixed reviews, with some dismissed it harshly, while others praised it as the group’s most consistent effort. With O'Connor fading almost entirely into the background, and unlike House of Pain’s first two albums that were brash, aggressive, and built for impact, the focus was on more brooding, often critical themes. Critics were divided some welcomed the grittier tone and saw it as their most cohesive effort, while others thought it lacked direction and energy compared to the raw spark of their earlier work.

Also in 1996, O'Connor was announced to be part of the cast of Soleil Moon Frye directorial debut. The film was released in 1998 as Wild Horses.

=== 1997–2018: return from obscurity and back to prominence ===
After House of Pain disbanded, O'Connor said he struggled with drug abuse, a problem he developed when he became famous, and spent all the money he made from the group's success. He said he sobered up briefly in 2000 joining the twelve-step program but relapsed after a having a drink, and rejoined the program in 2005, and stayed sober ever since.

Nevertheless, O'Connor continued being involved in musical projects and did freelance work such as logo designing, streetwear, and sneakers.

In 2001, O'Connor's next group XSupermodels (XSM) only saw a promotional release for their album Artificial Intelligence. That year, he was the featured rapper in Powerman 5000's remake of the Frankie Goes to Hollywood hit song "Relax", on the Zoolander soundtrack.

In late 2004, the creation of the rap supergroup La Coka Nostra started when O'Connor was mentoring young artists. O'Connor explains that he took notice of two up and comers George Carroll (Slaine) and John Faster (Big Left) and brought them to meet his former DJ from House of Pain, Leor Diamant. They decided to make a group with an additional rapper, who did not stay too long, that Diamant took under his wing, as well as O'Connor becoming its hype man and art director. The group started releasing music on MySpace, and went viral. Eventually, O'Connor felt that there was a void and asked experienced rapper William Braunstein (Ill Bill) to join. The group's name came about, when O'Connor teased other members with that nickname, after they had a night out. Eventually, former House of Pain colleague Erik Schrody, showed interest to join. By 2008, the group consisted of O'Connor, Carroll, Diamant, Braunstein, and Schrody (who left some time after the first album was released).

In 2005, the documentary film Just for Kicks about the sneaker phenomena and history in hip-hop, had its world premiere. O'Connor was among the producers. It won "Best Documentary", and "Best Overall Film" at the USVI Film festival. It was part of the official selection at Tribeca Film Festival, Sheffield Documentary Festival, Amsterdam Documentary Festival, Bangkok International Film Festival, Res Fest, New York Latino Film Festival, San Francisco Black Film Festival, NYC Urban World Festival, Leipzig Documentary Festival, and US Virgin Islands Film Festivals.

In 2009, La Coka Nostra released A Brand You Can Trust was released on July 14, 2009, on Suburban Noize Records. It sold over 500,000 units. Their debut was met with generally positive reception, praised for delivering the raw intensity and high-energy sound expected from a group of seasoned underground veterans. Reviewers noted it as a mostly solid effort that lived up to the hype surrounding the supergroup, showcasing strong chemistry and hard-hitting production. The overall impression was that of a powerful and promising release that confirmed the group’s reputation.

Also in 2009, House of Pain reunited at a private event held by UFC president Dana White in Boston on St. Patrick's Day. It was officially announced on August 10, 2010, that House of Pain had reunited and performed their first "official" show in a decade, on September 25, 2010. From thereon, they continued performing shows. House of Pain reunited in 2017 for a 25th Anniversary Tour.

Finally that year, while touring, they had a three-day layover in Tulsa, Oklahoma. O'Connor took advantage of this free time to visit the town and found the location of the house used by the main characters in the filmThe Outsiders (1983). He took a picture, posted it on MySpace, and the photo went viral. This led O'Connor to found The Delta Bravo Urban Exploration Team. With team-members in Los Angeles, Chicago, and New York City, their visit documents notable pop culture landmarks from film, television, music, and true crime. One of their speciality is to show a photo of what the location looks like now to compared it to what it looked like when it was part of something that gained notoriety. Delta Bravo identified locations from movies and television shows including Fast Times at Ridgemont High (1982), Saturday Night Fever (1977), Valley Girl (1983), The Bad News Bears (1976), All in the Family (1971 to 1979), Gilligan's Island (1964 to 1967), etc.

In 2012, La Coka Nostra released their second album, Masters of the Dark Arts. It reached 176 on Billboard Top Current Albums, 40 on Independent Albums, and 31 on Top R&B/Hip-Hop Albums. The album was widely received as a fierce and uncompromising record that stayed true to La Coka Nostra’s gritty identity. Critics highlighted its unapologetically dark tone, describing it as a hard-edged alternative to mainstream, pop-oriented rap. The album was praised for its heavy boom-bap production, sharp scratching, and raw, street-driven lyricism, with many noting that it captured the group at their most menacing and effective.

In 2016, La Coka Nostra released To Thine Own Self Be True. The album reached 38 on the Billboard Top R&B/Hip-Hop Albums. Steve Juon of RapReviews gave eight point five out of ten and wrote "for a blissful 45 minutes it's an uncut dose of that nostalgia straight through the ear canals to the dopamine centers of my brain".

That same year, the film Let Me Make You a Martyr premiered, in which O'Connor plays a role.

=== 2019–present: The Outsiders House museum and current works ===
O'Connor, a lifelong fan of S. E. Hinton's book The Outsiders and its film adaptation by Francis Ford Coppola, opened The Outsiders House Museum in Tulsa, Oklahoma, on August 9, 2019. In 2009, O'Connor discovered the house where the lead characters of the film, the Curtis Brothers, lived in Tulsa, Oklahoma. O'Connor always had the thought of buying it, which he eventually did in 2016. O'Connor said he bought it sight unseen and when he first went inside that it was falling apart. With the help of friends, the Oklahoma Film and Music Office, the City Council, local business and individuals who volunteered the restoration started. After raising funds the house went through extensive renovations to restore it and maintain its authenticity from the film. A GoFundMe was set up for additional funds, notable donors include Jack White who donated $30,000 and Billy Idol. Also to raise funds, screenings of the film were organized that actor C. Thomas Howell (one of the film's lead) attended. Also in 2016, the street signs on the corner were changed to "The Outsiders way" and "The Curtis Brothers Lane". Since its opening, the museum now contains a collection of The Outsiders memorabilia. On the quiz show Jeopardy! a question about him and the museum was showcased ''Rapper Danny Boy O'Connor loved the Tulsa house used in the film version of this author's The Outsiders so he restored it''. Of the museum Hinton said “Danny has done a great job with the Outsiders House. People come from all over the United States, and even the world. He said teenage girls have walked in and burst into tears. It floors me.” The Museum is widely praised as a must-visit destination, especially for fans of the film or novel, and is consistently highlighted as one of Tulsa's top attractions. On the 2024 list of '25 things to eat, see and do this summer' People magazine listed The Outsiders House museum at number 3. For his efforts on preserving a cultural landmark O'Connor received a key to the city of Tulsa.

On November 1 of that year, the institution installed a plaque commemorating in a scene Rumble Fish (1983), another film directed by Coppola based on a Hinton novel shot in Tulsa, in the alley south of 5th Street between Main Street and Boston Avenue.

In 2021, separately from The Delta Bravo Urban Exploration Team and The Outsiders House museum, O'Connor acted in the suspense film Ida Red. That same year he was a prominent interviewee in Soleil Moon Frye's documentary Kid 90.

On June 3, 2022, O'Connor released a photography exhibit named ''We saw the same sunset'' at Mother Road Market. It shows the photos of a thousand sunset taken from the same window on the thirteenth floor of the Mayo Hotel. O'Connor said, “This exhibit is my love letter to Tulsa, when I moved from L.A. to Tulsa five years ago, I was awestruck by Tulsa’s sunsets. I love the idea that we all share the same sunset regardless of our differences, bringing us a step closer to each other.” On June 10, the short documentary Old House New Home, where O'Connor is credited as an executive producer, premiered at the DeadCENTER Film Festival, where it won the best Okie short award. The documentary is about O'Connor's effort to preserve the house from The Outsiders. At the same festival the thriller film Out for Exile premiered. In it O'Connor plays a role. In October, O'Connor with The Outsiders House Museum published the book The Outsiders ‘Rare and Unseen’, which contains 148 photos by David Burnett who was the set's photographer. O'Connor said: “We originally got the first lot of photos and then [Burnett] said there may be more. They found the rougher photos, and for me, that’s where the rubber meets the road because they’re unpolished, their guard’s down, they’re not posing".

In 2023, O'Connor acted in two John Swab's films Little Dixie, and One Day as Lion. On April 14 of that year, as part of a 40th anniversary celebration of the release of The Outsiders, O'Connor installed a plaque commemorating the film which was installed at the Admiral Twin drive-In where a scene was shot.

In February 2024, O'Connor served as judge alongside Olivia Jordan and Zac Hanson for the talent competition the "Big Show Off". The event was created to raise funds and awareness to the homelessness issues in Tulsa. Also that month the documentary film Mad Props started its theatrical run. The film is about movie prop collectors and O'Connor is among the interviewees. In May, O'Connor with The Outsiders House Museum published the book The Outsiders on set, which contains 254 pages of photos by Nancy Moran a photographer who visited The Outsiders's set while they were shooting. O'Connor explained that when he discovered that this additional slew of photos existed, he approached Moran, who he did not know, and to his surprise she let him have the negatives so that he could develop them. On December 14, the 98th annual Tulsa Christmas Parade celebrated The Outsiders House Museum with its theme, "Stay Gold, Merry, and Bright," and O'Connor served as Grand Marshal.

In January 2025, at the annual Tulsa Regional Chamber event, awards were distributed to partners whose efforts were valued in 2024. O'Connor won the "Partner of the year" award for "Regional Tourism". In April of that year, O'Connor announced he was stepping down as executive director to take the role of founder. He explained that "after years of serving as executive director, I’m stepping into a new role as founder of The Outsiders House Museum. Building this place from the ground up has been one of the greatest honors of my life. What started as a dream became a reality thanks to all of you - our supporters, our visitors, our community. But every great story has chapters, and it's time to turn the page.” While staying active with the museums activities he added that a new executive director was needed to “lead the Museum into it's [sic] next phase of growth and development.” The following month a new executive director was chosen.

On November 4, Viking Books released Staying Gold: The Oral History of The Outsiders, written by O'Connor and Jimmie Tramel, the book is about the conception of The Outsiders, turning it into a movie, to its current legacy. Dana Leydig, the executive editor of the publishing company, said “millions of copies sold, a film directed by the legendary Francis Ford Coppola, a Tony award-winning musical and an entire museum dedicated to enshrining its legacy. "Now with the publication of the oral history we’re further cementing The Outsiders as an enduring literary and pop culture phenomenon." On the book O'Connor said that “as a lifelong fan, I’m honored to help connect the dots and co-create the oral history of The Outsiders. Opening The Outsiders House Museum sparked a wave of momentum that renewed the world’s love for the book and film and gave us the perfect moment to tell this story in the words of those who lived it.”

Currently, O'Connor serves as a member of the Arts Commission of City of Tulsa. This came about when the Mayor searched for Tulsans willing to volunteer their time to City of Tulsa Authority, Board or Commission. The initiative is meant to have a citizen committees with a range of interests and their advice to develop future policies.

== Personal life ==
During the height of House of Pain, O'Connor had a friendship with Mickey Rourke and was romantically involved with Soleil Moon Frye (with whom he maintains a friendship). He is also friends with Robert Romanus.

== Accolades ==
1992 - Grammy Award for Best Rap Performance by a Duo or Group - "Jump Around" - Nomination - with House of Pain

2017 - Honorary High School Diploma - Will Rogers High School

2018 - Key to the city - Tulsa, Oklahoma

2025 - Tulsa Regional Chamber - Winner - Partner of the year: Regional tourism

== Discography ==
=== with House of Pain ===
- House of Pain (1992)
- Same as It Ever Was (1994)
- Truth Crushed to Earth Shall Rise Again (1996)

=== with XSupermodels ===
- Artificial Intelligence (2001) promo album

=== with La Coka Nostra ===
- A Brand You Can Trust (2009)
- Masters of the Dark Arts (2012)
- To Thine Own Self Be True (2016)

== Filmography ==
=== Actor ===
- Who's the Man? (1993) - Steve
- Shake, Rattle and Rock! (1994) Cochran's Drummer Boy
- Wild Horses (1998)
- Let Me Make You a Martyr (2016) - Willie
- Ida Red (2021) - Bird
- Out for Exile (2022)
- Little Dixie (2023) - Coka
- One Day as Lion (2023) - Prison Guard MacDougal
- King Ivory (2024) - Burl Cain

=== Interviewee ===
- Kid 90 (2021)
- Mad Props (2024)

=== Producer ===
- Just for Kicks (2005)
- Old House New Home (2022)

== Bibliography ==
- 2022 - The Outsiders ‘Rare and Unseen’ - with David Burnett
- 2024 - The Outsiders on set - with Nancy Moran
- 2025 - Staying Gold: The Oral History of The Outsiders - with Jimmie Tramel
