= Let's Go Through the Motions =

Single by Jodeci

from the album Who's the Man?: Original Motion Picture Soundtrack
- Released: April 6, 1993
- Genre: R&B; hip hop soul; new jack swing
- Length: 5:13
- Label: Uptown; MCA
- Lyricist: Donald Earle DeGrate Jr.
- Producer: DeVante Swing

Jodeci singles chronology
"I'm Still Waiting" (1992)	"Let's Go Through the Motions" (1993)	"Lately" (1993)

Who's the Man?: Original Motion Picture Soundtrack singles chronology
"Let's Go Through the Motions" (1993)	"Hittin' Switches" (1993)

"Let's Go Through the Motions" is a song written and produced by DeVante Swing and performed by American R&B group Jodeci. It was released on April 6, 1993, through Uptown/MCA Records as the lead single off the original motion picture soundtrack of Ted Demme's film Who's the Man? In the United States, the song peaked at numbers 65 and 72 on the Billboard Hot 100 and Cash Box Top 100 charts. Additionally, it reached number 53 on the Radio Songs, number 31 on the Hot R&B/Hip-Hop Songs, number 43 on the R&B/Hip-Hop Airplay, number 34 on the Rhythmic Airplay and number 23 on the Dance Singles Sales.

== Track listing ==
CD Maxi-Single
No.	Title	Lyrics	Music	Length
1.	"Let's Go Through the Motions" (Radio)	Donald Earle DeGrate Jr.	Donald Earle DeGrate Jr.; Chad Elliott	4:15
2.	"Let's Go Through the Motions" (Instrumental)	DeGrate Jr.	DeGrate Jr.; Elliott	4:15
3.	"Let's Go Through the Motions" (Intro Radio)	DeGrate Jr.	DeGrate Jr.; Elliott	4:52

== Personnel ==
- Joel "JoJo" Hailey – vocals
- Cedric "K-Ci" Hailey – vocals
- Donald "DeVante Swing" DeGrate Jr. – lyrics, music, vocals, producer
- Dalvin "Mr. Dalvin" DeGrate – vocals
- Chad "Dr. Ceuss" Elliott – music
- Darryl Pearson – additional producer
- Tim "Buttnaked Tim Dawg" Patterson – associate producer
- James Earl Jones Jr. – associate producer
- Andre Harrell – executive producer
- Sean "Puffy" Combs – executive producer
- Mark Siegel – executive producer
- Kathy Nelson – music supervisor
- Toby Emmerich – music supervisor

== Charts ==
Chart (1993)	Peak position
US Billboard Hot 100	65
US Radio Songs (Billboard)	53
US Hot R&B/Hip-Hop Songs (Billboard)	31
US R&B/Hip-Hop Airplay (Billboard)	43
US Rhythmic Airplay (Billboard)	34
US Dance Singles Sales (Billboard)	23
US Cash Box Top 100	72
