= Just Another Victim =

Single by Helmet and House of Pain

from the album Music from the Motion Picture Judgement Night
- Released: August 17, 1993
- Genre: Rap metal; thrash metal
- Length: 4:23
- Label: Immortal; Epic
- Songwriters: Page Hamilton; Erik Schrody; Henry Bogdan; John Stanier; Leor Dimant
- Producers: Helmet; House of Pain

Helmet singles chronology
"Give It" (1992)	"Just Another Victim" (1993)	"Born Annoying" (1993)

House of Pain singles chronology
"Who's the Man?" (1993)	"Just Another Victim" (1993)	"On Point" (1994)

Music from the Motion Picture Judgement Night singles chronology
"Judgment Night" (1993)	"Just Another Victim" (1993)	"Another Body Murdered" (1993)

"Just Another Victim" is a song written, produced and performed by American alternative metal band Helmet and American hip-hop group House of Pain. It was released on August 17, 1993, through Immortal Records/Epic Soundtrax as the second single from the soundtrack to Stephen Hopkins' film Judgment Night.

Aside from the original version of the song, the single also included several remixes by producer T-Ray that also appeared on the B-side of Faith No More and Boo-Yaa T.R.I.B.E.'s "Another Body Murdered".

== Accolades ==
Publication	List	Rank	Ref.
Kerrang!	666 Songs You Must Own: The Ultimate Playlist (Crossover)	4	

== Track listing ==
No.	Title	Length
1.	"Just Another Victim" (Album Version)
2.	"Just Another Victim" (T-Ray Devil Worship Mix)
3.	"Just Another Victim" (Instrumental)
4.	"Just Another Victim" (T-Ray Dead And Stinking Mix)
5.	"Just Another Victim" (T-Ray Heavy Metal Jazz Mix)
Total length:		20:31

== Charts ==
Chart (1993)	Peak position
New Zealand (Recorded Music NZ)	28
