= Who's the Man? (song) =

Single by House of Pain

from the album Who's the Man?: Original Motion Picture Soundtrack
- B-side: "Put on Your Shit Kickers"
- Released: 1993
- Recorded: 1992
- Studio: Image Recording Studios (Hollywood, CA)
- Genre: Hardcore hip hop
- Length: 4:03
- Label: Tommy Boy
- Songwriter(s): Erik Schrody; Daniel O'Conner; Leor Dimant; Ronald Bell; Ray Wright; Kevin Lassiter; Peter Duarte; Callie Cheek; Wilson Beckett; Dennis White; Kevin Bell
- Producer(s): DJ Lethal; Everlast

House of Pain singles chronology
"Shamrocks and Shenanigans (Boom Shalock Lock Boom)" (1992)	"Who's the Man?" (1993)	"Just Another Victim" (1993)

Who's the Man?: Original Motion Picture Soundtrack singles chronology
"Hittin' Switches" (1993)	"Who's the Man?" (1993)	"Party and Bullshit" (1993)

Music video
- "Who's the Man" on YouTube

"Who's the Man?" is a song performed by American hardcore hip hop group House of Pain. It was released in 1993 via Tommy Boy Records as the third single off the original motion picture soundtrack of Ted Demme's film Who's the Man?. Recording sessions took place at Image Recording Studios in Hollywood. Production was handled by members DJ Lethal and Everlast, who used a sample of the Kay Gees' 1974 song "Who's the Man? (With the Master Plan)".

In the United States, the song peaked at number 96 on the Billboard Hot 100, number 77 on the Hot R&B/Hip-Hop Songs and number 10 on the Dance Singles Sales charts. It also made it to number 23 on the UK Singles Chart as "Shamrocks and Shenanigans/Who's The Man" single.

The song appeared in the group's second studio album, Same as It Ever Was, which was released in 1994.

== Track listing ==
No.	Title	Writer(s)	Producer(s)	Length
1.	"Who's the Man?" (Instrumental)	Erik Schrody; Daniel O'Conner; Leor Dimant; Ronald Bell; Ray Wright; Kevin Lassiter; Peter Duarte; Callie Cheek; Wilson Beckett; Dennis White; Kevin Bell	DJ Lethal; Everlast	4:03
2.	"Who's the Man?"	Schrody; O'Conner; Dimant; R. Bell; Wright; Lassiter; Duarte; Cheek; Beckett; White; K. Bell	DJ Lethal; Everlast	4:03
3.	"Put on Your Shit Kickers" (T-Ray Remix)	Schrody; Lawrence Muggerud	DJ Muggs	4:03
4.	"Put on Your Shit Kickers" (Kick Some)	Schrody; Muggerud	DJ Muggs	4:03
Total length:				16:12

== Personnel ==
- Erik "Everlast" Schrody – songwriter, vocals, producer, mixing
- Daniel "Danny Boy" O'Conner – songwriter, logo design
- Leor "DJ Lethal" Dimant – songwriter, producer, mixing
- Jason Roberts – recording
- Erwin Gorostiza – art direction
- Mark Weinberg – design
- Mike "Rick Klotz" Dytri – logo design
- Charlie Pizzarello – photography

== Charts ==
Weekly chart performance for "Who's the Man?"
Chart (1993)	Peak position
UK Singles (OCC) as "Shamrocks and Shenanigans/Who's the Man"	23
US Billboard Hot 100	96
US Dance Singles Sales (Billboard)	10
US Hot R&B/Hip-Hop Singles Sales (Billboard)	54
US Bubbling Under R&B/Hip-Hop Songs (Billboard)	14
US Hot R&B/Hip-Hop Songs (Billboard)	77
