= The Outsiders House Museum =

Film set museum in Tulsa, Oklahoma

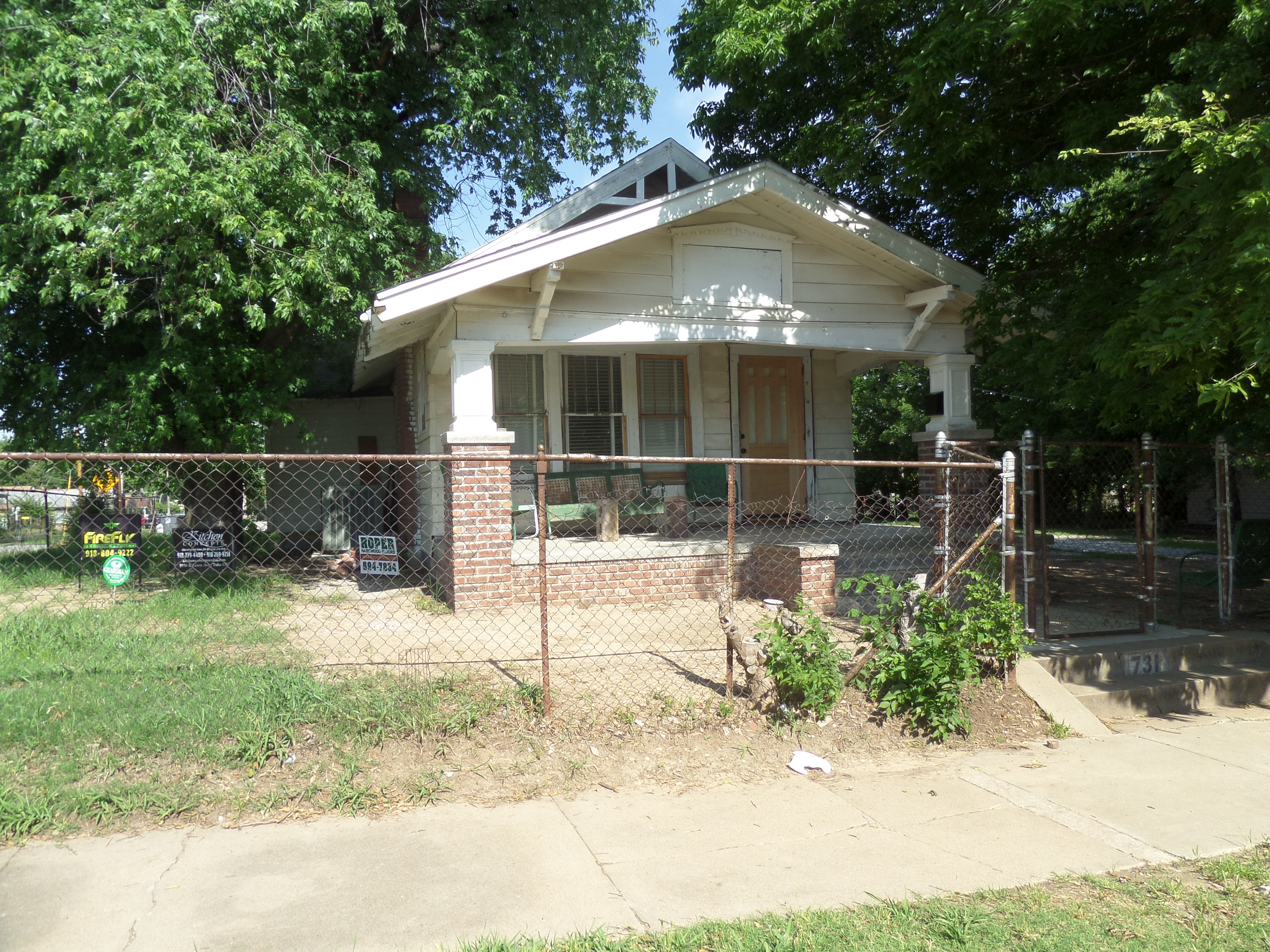
- The Outsiders House Museum; May 31, 2017
- Established: 2017 (House built circa 1920)
- Location: 731 Curtis Brothers Lane; Tulsa, Oklahoma 74106; USA
- Coordinates: 36.16547°N 95.97028°W
- Founder: Danny O'Connor
- Website: www.theoutsidershouse.com

The Outsiders House Museum is a museum in Tulsa, Oklahoma, about Francis Ford Coppola's coming-of-age movie, The Outsiders (1983), and the 1967 novel by the same name it adapts by S. E. Hinton. It aims to preserve the house which served as the primary film set for the Curtis Brothers (the story's lead characters). The museum was created by hip-hop artist Danny Boy O'Connor, who is a long-time fan of The Outsiders.

The house, which is estimated to have been built in 1920, served as a private residence prior to becoming a museum, except when Coppola used it for the screen adaptation of Hinton's novel, circa 1982. The film has maintained a following, and is also notable due to its young cast, who all had subsequently major acting careers.

In 2009, while on tour, O'Connor had a three-day layover in Tulsa and decided to explore the locations of the film, where he rediscovered the house. Afterwards, he would continue to visit the location on a regular basis, and bought the house in 2016. After extensive renovations to restore and maintain its authenticity from the film, it opened to the public on August 9, 2019.

Moving forward, the museum has expanded its cultural and community impact through various projects and recognitions. Two plaques commemorating the collaboration between Coppola and Hinton were installed, and restoration efforts extended to the now non-operational DX gas station featured in the film. With the museum, O'Connor published two photography books: The Outsiders ‘Rare and Unseen’ (2022) with David Burnett, and The Outsiders on Set (2024) with Nancy Moran. By 2022, the museum welcomed approximately 20,000 visitors. In 2023, it was featured as a landmark in the Tulsa edition of the Monopoly board game. The museum, celebrated for its fan-driven design and extensive collection of memorabilia, has received praise from publications, solidifying its status as a significant cultural site.

== History ==
=== 1920 to 2008: private residence and set for The Outsiders film ===
Located in North Tulsa's Crutchfield neighborhood at 731 North St. Louis Ave on the corner it shares with East Independence Street, surveying of the area date back to 1919, and is estimated to have been built in 1920 due to a newspaper clipping discovered in the walls during its 2016 renovations. The house served as a private residence except for the time it became a set for the Curtis Brothers' home during the filming of the movie The Outsiders (1983) circa 1982. The film was directed by Francis Ford Coppola and based on the 1967 novel of the same name by S. E. Hinton. The film is notable for casting young actors before their rise to fame, which includes C. Thomas Howell, Ralph Macchio, Matt Dillon, Patrick Swayze, Rob Lowe, Emilio Estevez, Tom Cruise, and Diane Lane. Furthermore, since its release it retains a fanbase.

After the filming the house returned to its original purpose.

=== 2009 to 2015: re-discovery ===
In 2009, hip hop artist Danny Boy O'Connor was touring and had a three days layover in Tulsa. O'Connor, a lifelong fan of The Outsiders, suddenly remembered that he was in the town where the film was shot and asked a cab driver to take him on a tour of the locations and rediscovered the house. He took a picture, posted it on MySpace, and the photo went viral. This led O'Connor to found The Delta Bravo Urban Exploration Team, a project that leads a team to visit documents notable pop culture landmarks from film, television, music, and true crime. The house is noted to be their first location.

Afterward O'Connor would continue to visit the location while stopping in Tulsa.

=== 2016 to 2018: purchase and restoration ===
On March 9, 2016, O'Connor bought the house, for $15,000. O'Connor said he bought it sight unseen and when he first went inside that it was in a dire condition. With the help of his friends Zachary Matthew and Donnie Rich, the renovations started shortly after with the goal of making it as authentic as it was in the film. Also, the Oklahoma Film and Music Office and the City Council lent their support. Local business and individuals volunteered to help including leveling the foundation, mowing the lawn, to getting rid of all the trash. Part of the restoration efforts, the renovation team worked to make sure that the house looked as it did in the film, such as remaking the front door, retaining fence damage, and missing wood panels in windows. A GoFundMe was set up for additional funds, notable donors include Jack White who donated $30,000 and Billy Idol. Also to raise funds, screenings of the film were organized that actor C. Thomas Howell attended. On August 5, the street signs on the corner were changed to "The Outsiders Way" and "The Curtis Brothers Lane".

In 2018, an event at the house was organized where Hinton and Howell imprinted their hands in wet cement. Furthermore, with O'Connor all three were presented with a key to the city of Tulsa.

=== 2019 to present day: opening and aftermath ===
On August 9, 2019, a ribbon-cutting ceremony marked the official opening of the museum.

Also that year, the institution installed a plaque commemorating a scene in Rumble Fish (1983), another film directed by Coppola based on a Hinton novel shot in Tulsa, in the alley south of 5th Street between Main Street and Boston Avenue.

Aside from Howell, between its restoration and opening, other stars of the films that have visited include Rob Lowe, Ralph Macchio, and Matt Dillon.

In September 2022, in Sperry, Oklahoma, the group Upward Sperry completed the restoration of the now un-operational DX gas station seen in the film. The group's president Gary Coulson said, “It’s really growing. I almost hate to say it, but it’s almost like a cult following. They stream through here - what that does is get people here.” With O'Connor they are planning to revitalize The Outsiders nostalgia in Sperry.

In October 2022, O'Connor with The Outsiders House Museum published the book The Outsiders ‘Rare and Unseen’, which contains 148 photos by David Burnett who was the set's photographer. O'Connor said: “We originally got the first lot of photos and then [Burnett] said there may be more,” said O’Connor. “They found the rougher photos, and for me, that’s where the rubber meets the road because they’re unpolished, their guard’s down, they’re not posing".

By the end of 2022, O'Connor estimated that he had received approximatively 20,000 visitors.

On April 14, 2023, as part of a 40th anniversary celebration of the release of the film, the institution installed a plaque commemorating the film, which was installed at the Admiral Twin Drive-In where a scene was shot.

Also in 2023, a Tulsa edition of the Monopoly board game was made, where toy manufacturer Hasbro choose the museum as a landmark feature.

In May 2024, O'Connor with The Outsiders House Museum published the book The Outsiders on Set, which contains 254 pages of photos by Nancy Moran a photographer who visited The Outsiders's set while they were shooting. O'Connor explained that when he discovered that this additional slew of photos existed, he approached Moran, who he didn't know, and to his surprise she let him have the negatives so that he could develop them.

On December 14, 2024, the 98th annual Tulsa Christmas Parade celebrated The Outsiders House Museum with its theme, "Stay Gold, Merry, and Bright," and O'Connor served as Grand Marshal.

== Design ==
The Outsiders House Museum is designed to be a museum that's created by the fans and for the fans. It spans the entire house and features the front porch, living room, dining room, bathroom, and kitchen as they appeared in the film. The collection includes over 500 editions of the book in various languages, Francis Ford Coppola's director chair, clothes worn by actors, a 1949 Plymouth Super Deluxe, etc.

== Reception ==
Of the museum, author S.E. Hinton said, “Danny has done a great job with the Outsiders House. People come from all over the United States, and even the world. He said teenage girls have walked in and burst into tears. It floors me.”

Kristi Eaton of Condé Nast Traveler magazine said that The Outsiders House Museum is a "worthy stop". Hannah Rystedt of OU Daily called it a gem and said, "it is a dream for a fan of the film or novel." Heide Brandes of Southern Living magazine said in was among the best 26 things to visit in Tulsa. On the 2024 list of "25 Things to Eat, See and Do This Summer", People magazine listed The Outsiders House Museum at number 3.
