= Truth Crushed to Earth Shall Rise Again =

Studio album by House of Pain
- Released: October 22, 1996
- Recorded: 1995–1996
- Studio: Ameraycan (North Hollywood, CA)
- Genre: Hip-hop
- Length: 50:37
- Label: Tommy Boy
- Producers: DJ Lethal; Everlast

House of Pain chronology
Same as It Ever Was (1994)	Truth Crushed to Earth Shall Rise Again (1996)

Singles from Truth Crushed to Earth Shall Rise Again
- 1. "Pass the Jinn" Released: May 28, 1996; 2. "Fed Up" Released: September 23, 1996

Truth Crushed to Earth Shall Rise Again is the third and final studio album by American hip-hop group House of Pain. It was released in October 22, 1996, via Tommy Boy Records. The recording sessions took place at Ameraycan Studios in North Hollywood. The album was produced by members DJ Lethal and Everlast. It features guest appearances from Guru and Sadat X and contributions from Cokni O'Dire and Divine Styler.

The album's title is a line from William Cullen Bryant's poem "The Battle-Field". The album is called Truth Crushed to Earth Shall Rise Again, but the cover of the CD reads Truth Crushed To Earth Will Rise Again.

The album peaked at number 47 on the Billboard 200 and number 31 on the Top R&B/Hip-Hop Albums in the United States, and number 69 in the Netherlands.

It was preceded with two singles: "Pass the Jinn" b/w "Heart Full of Sorrow" and "Fed Up". Its second single, "Fed Up", reached number 68 on the UK singles chart and number 45 in New Zealand.

== Critical reception ==
Professional ratings
Review scores
Source	Rating
AllMusic	2.5/5 stars
Christgau's Consumer Guide: Albums of the '90s	(dud)
The Encyclopedia of Popular Music	3/5 stars
MusicHound Rock: The Essential Album Guide	3/5 stars
Muzik	2/5 stars
RapReviews	7/10
(The New) Rolling Stone Album Guide	2.5/5 stars
The Source	3/5 stars
Sputnikmusic	4/5
The Sydney Morning Herald	3/5 stars

Sputnikmusic wrote that "the trio's most rounded, consistent and memorable LP is grossly under-appreciated". Vibe wrote that the majority of DJ Lethal's beats are "surface-level and boring".

== Track listing ==
No.	Title	Writer(s)	Length
1.	"The Have Nots"	Erik Schrody; Daniel O'Connor; Leor Dimant	4:24
2.	"Fed Up"	Schrody; Dimant; Charles Calello; Robert Stanley Crewe Jr.	5:01
3.	"What's That Smell"	Schrody; Dimant	3:04
4.	"Heart Full of Sorrow" (featuring Sadat X)	Schrody; Derek Murphy; Dimant	3:44
5.	"Earthquake"	Schrody; Dimant	4:49
6.	"Shut the Door"	Schrody; Dimant	4:35
7.	"Pass the Jinn"	Schrody; Dimant	4:56
8.	"No Doubt"	Schrody; Dimant	3:09
9.	"Choose Your Poison"	Schrody; O'Connor; Dimant	3:18
10.	"X-Files"	Schrody; Dimant	2:50
11.	"Fed Up (Remix)" (featuring Guru)	Schrody; Dimant; Calello; Crewe	4:14
12.	"Killa Rhyme Klik"	Schrody; Dimant; Henry Mancini	3:44
13.	"While I'm Here"	Schrody; Dimant	2:49

== Personnel ==
- Erik "Everlast" Schrody – vocals, producer, mixing, executive producer
- Daniel "Danny Boy" O'Connor – vocals, artwork concept
- Leor "DJ Lethal" DiMant – producer, executive producer
- Mark "Divine Styler" Richardson – additional vocals
- Olivier "Cokni O'Dire" Williams – additional vocals
- Derek "Sadat X" Murphy – vocals (track 4)
- Keith "Guru" Elam – vocals (track 11)
- Ross Donaldson – engineering
- Dave Collins – mastering

== Charts ==
Chart (1996)	Peak position
Canada Top Albums/CDs (RPM)	52
Dutch Albums (Album Top 100)	69
US Billboard 200	47
US Top R&B/Hip-Hop Albums (Billboard)	31
