= Forever Everlasting =

Studio album by Everlast
- Released: March 27, 1990
- Recorded: 1989–1990
- Studios: VCS Studios, Van Nuys, CA; Echo Sound, Los Angeles, CA
- Genre: Hip-hop
- Length: 48:09
- Label: Warner Bros.
- Producers: Bilal Bashir; Quincy Jones III

Everlast chronology
Forever Everlasting (1990)	Whitey Ford Sings the Blues (1998)

Singles from Forever Everlasting
- 1. "Never Missin' a Beat" Released: 1989; 2. "The Rhythm" Released: 1990; 3. "I Got the Knack" Released: 1990

Forever Everlasting is the debut solo studio album by American recording artist Everlast. It was released on March 27, 1990, via Warner Bros. Records. The eleven track full-length album features a remix song of his 1988 single "Syndication", and singles "Never Missin' a Beat" (released in 1989), "The Rhythm" and "I Got the Knack" (both dropped in 1990). Single "The Rhythm" featured guest appearances from his Rhyme Syndicate bandmates Donald D and Ice-T, as well as an early appearance from the Brand New Heavies singer N'Dea Davenport who is credited as "Diva", and "I Got the Knack" featured scratches provided by DJ Lethal, whom he would later join to form House of Pain.

== Critical reception ==
Professional ratings
Review scores
Source	Rating
AllMusic	3/5 stars
Robert Christgau	(neither)
The Encyclopedia of Popular Music	2/5 stars
Orlando Sentinel	3/5 stars

The Orlando Sentinel opined, "To Everlast's disadvantage, Ice-T takes a star turn on 'The Rhythm'... His brief time on the mike highlights the fact that he's a rap heavyweight while Everlast is at best an up-and-coming welterweight."

== Track listing ==
No.	Title	Length
1.	"Syndicate Soldier"	3:31
2.	"Speak No Evil" (featuring Kool Nick)	4:21
3.	"Syndication (Remix)"	4:26
4.	"What Is This?"	4:22
5.	"The Rhythm" (featuring Ice-T, Donald D & Diva)	4:19
6.	"I Got the Knack"	3:32
7.	"On the Edge"	5:39
8.	"Fuck Everyone"	4:02
9.	"Goodbye"	3:52
10.	"Pass It On"	5:55
11.	"Never Missin' a Beat"	4:10
Total length:		48:09

Samples

- "Syndicate Soldier" sampled "It's Just Begun" by the Jimmy Castor Bunch (1972) and "Give It Up or Turnit a Loose (Remix)" by James Brown (1986)
- "Speak No Evil" sampled "7-6-5-4-3-2-1 (Blow Your Whistle)" by Gary Toms Empire (1975), "Cold Gettin' Dumb" by Just-Ice (1986), "South Bronx" by Boogie Down Productions (1987), and "Let's Have Some Fun" by Bar-Kays (1977)
- "Syndication (Remix)" sampled "Apache" by Incredible Bongo Band (1973) and "the Champ" by the Mohawks (1968)
- "What Is This?" sampled "D'Ya Like Scratchin'?" by Malcolm McLaren and World's Famous Supreme Team (1983), "Disco Circus" by Martin Circus (1978) and "Jam on the Groove" by Ralph MacDonald (1976)
- "The Rhythm" sampled "The Champ" by the Mohawks (1968), "Comic Strip" by Mikey Dread (1979), "Operattack" by Grace Jones (1985), "Top Billin'" by Audio Two (1987), "God Make Me Funky" by the Headhunters & Pointer Sisters (1975), "Pee-Wee's Dance" by Joeski Love (1986), "Rebel Without a Pause" by Public Enemy (1987), "The Message from the Soul Sisters" by Myra Barnes (1970), "Jones the Rhythm" by Grace Jones (1985), "(Nothing Serious) Just Buggin'" by Whistle (1986), "Get Up Everybody (Get Up)" by Salt-N-Pepa (1988), "Saturday Night Style" by Mikey Dread (1979), "Buffalo Gals" by Malcolm McLaren (1982), "Girls I Got 'Em Locked" by Super Lover Cee and Casanova Rud (1988), "Unity" by Afrika Bambaataa & James Brown (1984), and "You Gots to Chill" by EPMD (1988)
- "I Got the Knack" sampled "My Sharona" by the Knack (1979), "I Know You Got Soul" by Bobby Byrd (1971), "The Big Beat" by Billy Squier (1980), "Hook and Sling - Part I" by Eddie Bo (1969), "Money Is" by Quincy Jones & Little Richard (1972), "Shout and Shimmy" by James Brown & the Famous Flames (1962), "Change the Beat (Female Version)" by Beside (1982), "Bang Zoom (Let's Go-Go)" by the Real Roxanne & Howie Tee (1986), and "Here We Go (Live at the Funhouse)" by Run-DMC (1985)
- "On the Edge" sampled "Danger! She's a Stranger" by Five Stairsteps (1967)
- "Fuck Everyone" sampled "Black Grass" by Bad Bascomb (1972), "Smiling Phases" by Blood, Sweat & Tears (1968), "Getting It On" by Dennis Coffey & the Detroit Guitar Band (1971), "Shack Up" by Banbarra (1975), and "Blow Your Head" by Fred Wesley & the J.B.'s (1974)
- "Goodbye" sampled "Na Na Hey Hey Kiss Him Goodbye" by Steam (1969) and "I'm Gonna Love You Just a Little More Baby" by Barry White (1973)
- "Pass It On" sampled "'T' Plays It Cool" by Marvin Gaye (1972), "Sister Sanctified" by Stanley Turrentine & Milt Jackson (1972), "I Can't Stand It" by James Brown (1974), "Impeach the President" by the Honey Drippers (1973), "The Assembly Line" by Commodores (1974), and "Syndication" by Everlast (1988)
- "Never Missin' a Beat" sampled "Doo Wa Ditty (Blow That Thing)" by Zapp (1982), "(Not Just) Knee Deep" by Funkadelic (1979), "Funky Drummer" by James Brown (1970), and "Midnight Theme" by Manzel (1979)

== Personnel ==
- Bilal Bashir – producer
- N'Dea Davenport – featured vocals (track 5)
- Leor Dimant – scratches (track 6)
- Lawrence A. Duhart – associate producer, engineer, auralist
- Jeff Higgenbothem – photography
- Karen Jones – A&R management
- Quincy Jones III – producer & keyboards (track 6)
- Donald Lamont – featured rap vocals (track 5)
- Tracy Lauren Marrow – executive producer, featured rap vocals (track 5)
- Benny Medina – executive producer
- Deborah Norcross – art direction
- Erik Francis Schrody – main artist, rap vocals
