= Same as It Ever Was =

Studio album by House of Pain
- Released: June 28, 1994
- Recorded: September 1992 – August 1993
- Studio: Image (Hollywood, California)
- Genre: Hardcore hip-hop
- Length: 49:22
- Labels: Tommy Boy; Warner Bros.
- Producers: DJ Muggs (also exec.); DJ Lethal; Diamond D; the Baker Boyz

House of Pain chronology
House of Pain (1992)	Same as It Ever Was (1994)	Truth Crushed to Earth Shall Rise Again (1996)

Singles from Same as It Ever Was
- 1. "Who's the Man?" Released: 1993; 2. "On Point" Released: 1994

Same as It Ever Was is the second album by American hardcore hip-hop group House of Pain. It was released in 1994 and peaked at number 12 on the Top R&B/Hip-Hop Albums and Billboard 200. To record the album, the group had to work around Everlast's house arrest for a gun charge.

== Reception ==
Professional ratings
Review scores
Source	Rating
AllMusic	4/5 stars
Christgau's Consumer Guide: Albums of the '90s	A−
Entertainment Weekly	A
Music Week	3/5 stars
NME	4/10
RapReviews	7/10
(The New) Rolling Stone Album Guide	4/5 stars
Select	4/5 medals
Sputnikmusic	2.5/5

Same as It Ever Was did not reach the same commercial heights as the group's previous album; however, Same as It Ever Was peaked at No. 12 on the Billboard 200 chart (their highest position to date) and also reached gold status by Recording Industry Association of America.

AllMusic gave it four out five stars. Matt Carlson of The Michigan Daily found the album quite good and noted "the music is laid back with some heavy driving forces underlying and strengthening it". Andrew Love of The Ocala Star-Banner gave it four stars saying "this is a band that has definitely progressed over the course of one album". J.D. Constantine of The Baltimore Sun did not like the album and found it monotonous and unimaginative. Roger Catlin of the Hartford Courant said that while finding the continuity monotonous it's "hard and compelling" as well as a "strong outing". Music critic Robert Christgau gave the album an A− and described it as "the hardest hip hop of the year."

== Track listing ==
No.	Title	Writer(s)	Producer(s)	Length
1.	"Back from the Dead"	Erik Schrody; Louis Freese; Lawrence Muggerud; Nick Vidal; Eric Vidal	Baka Boyz; DJ Muggs	3:32
2.	"I'm a Swing It"	Schrody; Leor Dimant; Juanita Carter; Chris Stokes	DJ Lethal	3:43
3.	"All That"	Schrody; DiMant	DJ Lethal	1:26
4.	"On Point"	Schrody; DiMant	DJ Lethal	3:48
5.	"Runnin' Up on Ya"	Schrody; Muggerud	DJ Muggs	3:17
6.	"Over There Shit"	Schrody; Muggerud	DJ Muggs	3:33
7.	"Word Is Bond" (featuring Diamond D)	Schrody; Joseph Kirkland	Diamond D	4:02
8.	"Keep It Comin'"	Schrody; Muggerud	DJ Muggs	3:43
9.	"Interlude"	DiMant	DJ Lethal	0:46
10.	"Same as It Ever Was"	Schrody; Muggerud; Daniel O'Connor	DJ Muggs	3:27
11.	"It Ain't a Crime"	Schrody; DiMant; Allen Toussaint	DJ Muggs; DJ Lethal (co.)	3:27
12.	"Where I'm From"	Schrody; DiMant	DJ Lethal	4:01
13.	"Still Got a Lotta Love" ("All My Love" Part 2)	Schrody; DiMant	DJ Lethal	2:53
14.	"Who's the Man?"	Schrody; O'Connor; DiMant; Ronald Bell; Ray Wright; Kevin Lassiter; Peter Duarte; Callie Cheek; Wilson Beckett; Dennis White; Kevin Bell	DJ Lethal	4:03
15.	"On Point" (Lethal Dose Remix)	Schrody; DiMant	DJ Lethal	3:33
Total length:				49:24

Sample credits

- "Back from the Dead" contains a sample of "Rumors", performed by the Timex Social Club.
- "I'm a Swing It" contains a sample of "You're Slippin'", performed by Boogie Down Productions.
- "All That" contains a sample of "Snakin' the Grass", performed by Cannonball Adderley.
- "On Point" contains a sample of "Inside Straight", performed by Cannonball Adderley.
- "Over There Shit" contains a sample of "Make It Funky (Milk Is Chillin') by Audio Two.
- "Word Is Bond" contains a sample of:
  - "Rivers Invitation", performed by Freddie Robinson.
  - "Death Becomes You", performed by Pete Rock & CL Smooth.
- "It Ain't a Crime" contains a sample of "Get Out of My Life, Woman", performed by Lee Dorsey.
- "Who's the Man" contains a sample of "The Master Plan", performed by the Kay Gees.
- "On Point" contains a sample of "Inside Straight", performed by Cannonball Adderley.

== Personnel ==
- Eric Francis Schrody – vocals (tracks 1–2, 4–8, 10–15), mixing (tracks 12, 14)
- Daniel O’Connor – vocals (tracks 2, 4, 10, 14–15), art direction
- Leor Dimant – vocals (tracks 4, 15), production (tracks 2–4, 9, 11–15), mixing (tracks 3, 9, 12, 14, 15)
- Lawrence Muggerud – executive production, production (tracks 1, 5–6, 8, 10–11), mixing (tracks 1–2, 4–6, 8, 10–11, 13, 15)
- Joseph Kirkland – vocals, production and mixing (track 7)
- Nick Vidal – production (track 1)
- Eric Vidal – production (track 1)
- Tom Coyne – mastering
- Jason Roberts – engineering
- Erwin Gorostiza – art direction
- Butch Belair – photography
- Ron Jaramillo – design
- Kenton Parker – logo design

== Charts ==
=== Weekly charts ===
Chart (1994)	Peak position
Australian Albums (ARIA Charts)	97
Austrian Albums (Ö3 Austria)	30
Canada Top Albums/CDs (RPM)	10
Dutch Albums (Album Top 100)	34
German Albums (Offizielle Top 100)	24
Hungarian Albums (MAHASZ)	32
New Zealand Albums (RMNZ)	14
Swedish Albums (Sverigetopplistan)	14
Swiss Albums (Schweizer Hitparade)	35
UK Albums (Official Charts)	8
US Billboard 200	12

=== Year-end charts ===
Chart (1994)	Position
Canada Top Albums/CDs (RPM)	59

== Certifications ==
Region	Certification	Certified units/sales
United States (RIAA)	Gold	500,000^{^}
^{^} Shipments figures based on certification alone.
