= House of Pain (album) =

1992 studio album by House of Pain

House of Pain (Fine Malt Lyrics)

Studio album by House of Pain
- Released: July 21, 1992
- Recorded: November 1991 – May 1992
- Genre: Hardcore hip-hop
- Length: 46:31
- Labels: Tommy Boy; CD 111
- Producers: DJ Lethal; DJ Muggs; Ralph Tha Funky Mexican; Pete Rock

House of Pain chronology
House of Pain (Fine Malt Lyrics) (1992)	Same as It Ever Was (1994)

Singles from House of Pain
- 1. "Jump Around" Released: May 5, 1992; 2. "Shamrocks and Shenanigans (Boom Shalock Lock Boom)" Released: 1992

Professional ratings
Review scores
Source	Rating
AllMusic	4/5 stars
Christgau's Consumer Guide: Albums of the '90s	(choice cut)
Rolling Stone	3.5/5 stars
(The New) Rolling Stone Album Guide	3/5 stars
Sputnikmusic	3.5/5

House of Pain (Fine Malt Lyrics), or simply House of Pain, is the debut studio album by American hardcore hip-hop group House of Pain, released on July 21, 1992, through Tommy Boy Records. The photograph on the album cover was taken at 820 South Fairfax Avenue in Los Angeles.

== Reception ==
- Rolling Stone (10/29/92, p. 70) – 3.5 Stars – Good Plus – "With a groovy swagger, this collection of hard-core hip-hop tracks offers many moments of technicolor snap and crackle, and also titled House of Pain."
- Q (12/92, p. 124) – 3 Stars – Good – "...their music is of the dense, hard-hitting school of hip hop...the group have absorbed black rap's musical lessons and create a satisfying platform for their above average deliveries..."
- The Source (9/92, p. 57) – 3.5 Stars – Good Plus – "...a very solid and at times exceptional album...imagine if Licensed to Ill wasn't an upper middle class Jewish thing but rather a working class Irish thang...the atmosphere is like that of a cross between a frat party and a bar room brawl..."
- NME (11/7/92, p. 34) – 6 – Good – "...contains some creative and accomplished rap music..."

== Track listing ==
House of Pain track listing
No.	Title	Writer(s)	Producer(s)	Length
1.	"Salutations"	Erik Schrody; Leor Dimant	DJ Lethal; DJ Muggs	1:08
2.	"Jump Around"	Schrody; Lawrence Muggerud	DJ Muggs	3:37
3.	"Put Your Head Out" (uncredited rap by B-Real of Cypress Hill)	Schrody; Muggerud; Louis Freese	DJ Muggs	3:02
4.	"Top o' the Morning to Ya"	Dimant; Schrody	DJ Lethal	3:37
5.	"Commercial 1"			0:08
6.	"House and the Rising Sun" (featuring Son Doobie of Funkdoobiest)	Dimant; Schrody; Jason Vasquez	DJ Lethal	3:39
7.	"Shamrocks and Shenanigans"	Dimant; Daniel O'Connor; Schrody	DJ Lethal	3:38
8.	"House of Pain Anthem"	Dimant; Schrody	DJ Lethal	2:35
9.	"Danny Boy, Danny Boy"	Schrody; Muggerud	DJ Lethal	1:54
10.	"Guess Who's Back"	Schrody; Muggerud	DJ Muggs	3:59
11.	"Commercial 2"			0:21
12.	"Put on Your Shit Kickers"	Schrody; Muggerud	DJ Muggs	3:10
13.	"Come and Get Some of This"	Schrod; Muggerud; Ralph Medrano	DJ Muggs; Ralph tha Funky Mexican	2:51
14.	"Life Goes On"	Schrody; Medrano	Ralph tha Funky Mexican	2:43
15.	"One for the Road"	Dimant; Muggerud; Schrody	DJ Muggs; DJ Lethal	2:49
16.	"Feel It"	Schrody; Medrano	Ralph tha Funky Mexican	4:00
17.	"All My Love"	Schrody; Dimant	DJ Lethal	3:20
Total length:				46:31

Reissue bonus tracks
No.	Title	Writer(s)	Producer(s)	Length
18.	"Jump Around" (Pete Rock Remix)	Schrody; Muggerud	DJ Muggs	3:56
19.	"Shamrocks and Shenanigans" (Boom Shalock Lock Boom / Butch Vig Mix)	Dimant; O'Connor; Schrody	DJ Lethal	3:57
Total length:				54:24

2022 30 Years reissue bonus tracks
No.	Title	Writer(s)	Producer(s)	Length
18.	"Jump Around" (25 Year Remix) (DJ Muggs featuring Damian Marley, Everlast, and Meyhem Lauren)	Schrody; Muggerud	DJ Muggs	3:13
19.	"Jump Around" (Pete Rock Remix)	Schrody; Muggerud	DJ Muggs	3:56
20.	"Shamrocks and Shenanigans" (Butch Vig Remix)	Dimant; O'Connor; Schrody	DJ Lethal	3:57
21.	"Shamrocks and Shenanigans (Boom Shalock Lock Boom)" (Salaam Main Pass)	Dimant; O'Connor; Schrody	DJ Lethal	4:05
22.	"Jump Around" (Instrumental)	Schrody; Muggerud	DJ Muggs	3:38
Total length:				65:20

Sample credits

- "Jump Around" contains a sample of "Harlem Shuffle", performed by Bob & Earl, and written by Bob Relf and Earl Nelson.
- "Top o' the Morning to Ya" contains a sample of:
  - "I Ain't Superstitious", written and performed by Willie Dixon.
  - "And the Lord Will Hear", performed by the Staple Singers.
- "Shamrocks and Shenanigans" contains a sample of "I Come to You Baby" by John Lee Hooker.
- "House of Pain Anthem" contains samples of "Open Wide" and "Aphrodite", performed by Bill Chase.
- "Guess Who's Back" contains a sample of "Cold Feet", written and performed by Albert King.
- "Come and Get Some of This" contains a sample of "I'm Funky" performed by Grootna.
- "Jump Around (Pete Rock Remix)" contains a sample of "Pot Belly", performed by Lou Donaldson.

== Personnel ==
House of Pain:

- Everlast – vocals, mixing (1)
- Danny Boy O'Connor – vocals (7–9, 12)
- DJ Lethal – scratches

Technical personnel:

- DJ Muggs – executive producer, mixing (1)
- Jason Roberts – engineer, mixing
- Tom Coyne – mastering

== Charts ==
=== Weekly charts ===
Chart (1992)	Peak position
Australian Albums (ARIA Charts)	91
Canada Top Albums/CDs (RPM)	6
Dutch Albums (Album Top 100)	47
German Albums (Offizielle Top 100)	61
New Zealand Albums (RMNZ)	35
UK Albums (Official Charts)	73
US Billboard 200	14
US Top R&B/Hip-Hop Albums (Billboard)	16

=== Year-end charts ===
Chart (1992)	Position
Canada Top Albums/CDs (RPM)	39
US Top R&B/Hip-Hop Albums (Billboard)	88
Chart (1993)	Position
Canada Top Albums/CDs (RPM)	38
US Billboard 200	79
US Top R&B/Hip-Hop Albums (Billboard)	62

== Certifications ==
Region	Certification	Certified units/sales
United States (RIAA)	Platinum	1,000,000^{^}
^{^} Shipments figures based on certification alone.
