= Who's the Man? (soundtrack) =

Soundtrack album by various artists
- Released: April 20, 1993
- Recorded: 1992
- Genre: Hip hop; R&B
- Length: 46:46
- Label: Uptown; MCA
- Producer: Sean "Puffy" Combs; Andre Harrell; Mark Siegell; DeVante Swing; D.X.T.; Easy Mo Bee; Everlast; Edward "DJ Eddie F" Ferrell; Randy Fuller; Crystal Johnson; James Earl Jones, Jr.; Dave Kelly; Kool Chris; Kenny "K-Smoove" Kornegay; Lord Finesse; Kevin "Big Kev" McDaniels; Darryl Pearson; Pete Rock & CL Smooth; Erick Sermon; Spark; Tim Dog; Jesse West; T. West; Darin Whittington

Singles from Who's the Man?
- 1. "Let's Go Through the Motions" Released: April 6, 1993; 2. "Hittin' Switches" Released: May 4, 1993; 3. "Who's the Man?" Released: May 4, 1993; 4. "Party and Bullshit" Released: June 29, 1993; 5. "You Don't Have to Worry" Released: November 30, 1993

The Who's the Man? Soundtrack is the soundtrack to the 1993 film Who's the Man?. The album was released in 1993 on Uptown/MCA Records. The soundtrack peaked at 32 on the Billboard 200 chart in 1993. The Notorious B.I.G.'s official debut single "Party and Bullshit" was released on the soundtrack.

== Release and reception ==
Professional ratings
Review scores
Source	Rating
AllMusic	2/5 stars
The Source	4/5 stars

The album reached number thirty-two on the U.S. Billboard 200 and reached the eighth spot on the R&B albums chart.

William Ruhlmann of AllMusic gave the soundtrack a lowly two-out-of-five rating, stating that the work is "mediocre, formula rap, in the typically boastful, lustful, mock-angry style, and none of it is memorable."

== Track listing ==
No.	Title	Music	Length
1.	"Party and Bullshit"	The Notorious B.I.G.	3:46
2.	"Let's Go Through the Motions"	Jodeci	5:13
3.	"What's Next on the Menu?"	Pete Rock & CL Smooth	5:32
4.	"You Don't Have to Worry"	Mary J. Blige	4:55
5.	"Hittin' Switches"	Erick Sermon	3:58
6.	"Hotness"	Heavy D and Buju Banton	3:56
7.	"Who's the Man?"	House of Pain	4:07
8.	"Lovin' You"	Crystal J. Johnson	4:04
9.	"Pimp or Die"	Father MC	3:56
10.	"Hello, It's Me"	Spark 950 and Timbo King	3:45
11.	"Ease Up"	3rd Eye and Group Home	3:28

== Personnel ==
Information taken from AllMusic.

- arranging – CL Smooth, Kenny "G-Love" Greene, Crystal J. Johnson, Dave Kelly
- art direction – Brett Wright
- assistant engineering – Mark Stumpy Brown, Todd Childress, Jimela Green, Robin Mays, Vaughn Merrick, Rob Summers, Sikru Shoe Uluoglu, Brian Vibberts
- assistant mixing – Scott Canto, Todd Childress, Rich July, John Kogan, Rob Summers
- associate production – James Earl Jones, Jr., Tim Dawg
- composing – DeVante Swing, Easy Mo Bee, Chad "Dr. Seuss" Elliott, Doug E. Fresh, Randy Fuller, Jimmy Hammond, Bob James, James Earl Jones, Jr., Dave Kelly, the Kay Gees, Kool and the Gang, Kool Chris, Kenny "K-Smoove" Kornegay, Kevin "Big Kev" McDaniels, Michael Moore, Peter Phillips, Erick Sermon, Tim Dog, Jesse West, T. West
- coordination – Crystal J. Johnson
- drum programming – Erick Sermon
- engineering – Charles "Prince Charles" Alexander, Mark Stumpy Brown, Scott Canto, Todd Childress, DJ Lethal, Everlast, Edward "DJ Eddie F" Ferrell, Jimela Green, Rich July, Dave Kelly, John Kogan, Tony Maserati, Robin Mays, Armen Mazlumian, Vaughn Merrick, Katherine Kat Miller, Johnny Most, Chrystin Nevarez, Pete Rock & CL Smooth, Darin Prindle, Jason Roberts, Rob Summers, Tim Dog, Sikru Shoe Uluoglu, Brian Vibberts
- executive production – Sean "Puffy" Combs, Andre Harrell, Mark Siegell
- lyricist(s) – 3rd Eye, Buju Banton, Big, CL Smooth, Cocheeks, DeVante Swing, Timothy Drayton, Father MC, Kenny "G-Love" Greene, Heavy D, Crystal J. Johnson, James Earl Jones, Jr., Dave Kelly, Erick Sermon
- mastering – Jose Rodriquez
- mixing – Charles "Prince Charles" Alexander, DJ Lethal, Tim Dawg, Everlast, Dave Kelly, Tony Maserati, Armen Mazlumian, Katherine Kat Miller, Johnny Most, Pete Rock & CL Smooth, Darin Prindle
- multi-instruments – 3rd Eye, Buju Banton, Big, Group Home, House of Pain, Jodeci, Crystal J. Johnson, Pete Rock & CL Smooth, Spark 950, Timbo King
- music supervision – Toby Emmerich, Kathy Nelson
- performer(s) – Buju Banton, Big, Mary J. Blige, Father MC, Heavy D & the Boyz, House of Pain, Jodeci, Crystal J. Johnson, Pete Rock & CL Smooth, Erick Sermon
- production – Sean "Puffy" Combs, DeVante Swing, DJ Lethal, D.X.T., Easy Mo Bee, Everlast, Edward "DJ Eddie F" Ferrell, Randy Fuller, Andre Harrell, Crystal J. Johnson, James Earl Jones, Jr., Dave Kelly, Kool Chris, Kenny "K-Smoove" Kornegay, Lord Finesse, Kevin "Big Kev" McDaniels, Darryl Pearson, Pete Rock & CL Smooth, Jason Roberts, Erick Sermon, Mark Siegell, Spark, Tim Dog, Jesse West, T. West, Darin Whittington
- rapping – Cocheeks, Father MC, Heavy D, J.Z., Tim Dawg
- vocal arranging – Crystal J. Johnson, Dave Kelly, CL Smooth
- vocals – 3rd Eye, Buju Banton, Big, Mary J. Blige, Father MC, Group Home, Heavy D, House of Pain, Jodeci, Crystal J. Johnson, Pete Rock & CL Smooth, Erick Sermon, Spark 950, Timbo King

== Charts ==
=== Weekly charts ===
Chart (1993)	Peak position
US Billboard 200	32
US Top R&B/Hip-Hop Albums (Billboard)	8

=== Year-end charts ===
Chart (1993)	Position
US Top R&B/Hip-Hop Albums (Billboard)	93

=== Singles ===
Year	Single	Peak chart positions				
Year	Single	U.S. Billboard Hot 100	U.S. Hot Dance Music/Maxi-Singles Sales	U.S. Hot R&B/Hip-Hop Singles & Tracks	U.S. Hot Rap Singles	U.S. Rhythmic Top 40
1993	"Let's Go Through the Motions"	65	23	31	—	34
1993	"Hittin' Switches"	—	20	—	14	—
1993	"Who's the Man?"	96	—	77	—	—
1994	"You Don't Have to Worry"	63	16	11	—	—

"—" denotes releases that did not chart.
