= Shamrocks and Shenanigans (Boom Shalock Lock Boom) =

1992 single by House of Pain

Single by House of Pain

from the album House of Pain (Fine Malt Lyrics)
- Released: 1992
- Recorded: 1992
- Studio: Image Recording Studios (Los Angeles, California)
- Genre: Hip hop
- Length: 3:38
- Label: Tommy Boy Records
- Songwriters: Erik Francis Schrody; Daniel O'Connor; Leor Dimant
- Producer: DJ Lethal (also exec.)

House of Pain singles chronology
"Jump Around" (1992)	"Shamrocks and Shenanigans (Boom Shalock Lock Boom)" (1992)	"Who's the Man?" (1993)

Music video
- "Shamrocks and Shenanigans (Boom Shalock Lock Boom)" on YouTube

Professional ratings
Review scores
Source	Rating
AllMusic	2.5/5 stars

"Shamrocks and Shenanigans (Boom Shalock Lock Boom)" is a song written and performed by American hip hop group House of Pain. Produced by DJ Lethal and released in 1992 through Tommy Boy Records, it was the second single from the group's debut studio album, House of Pain (Fine Malt Lyrics) (1992). It peaked at number 23 on the UK Singles Chart, and numbers 65 and 67 on the US Billboard Hot 100 and Cash Box Top 100 charts.

== Track listing ==
No.	Title	Length
1.	"Shamrocks and Shenanigans (Boom Shalock Lock Boom)" (LP Version)	3:38
2.	"Shamrocks and Shenanigans (Boom Shalock Lock Boom)" (Muggs Main Mix)	3:30
3.	"Shamrocks and Shenanigans (Boom Shalock Lock Boom)" (Muggs Instrumental)	3:30
4.	"Shamrocks and Shenanigans (Boom Shalock Lock Boom)" (Butch Vig Mix)	5:38
5.	"Shamrocks and Shenanigans (Boom Shalock Lock Boom)" (Salaam Main Pass)	3:58
6.	"Put Your Head Out" (LP Version)	3:02
Total length:		21:44

== Charts ==
Chart (1992–93)	Peak position
Australia (ARIA)	81
Europe (Eurochart Hot 100)	50
Netherlands (Dutch Top 40 Tipparade)	21
Netherlands (Single Top 100)	39
New Zealand (Recorded Music NZ)	18
UK Singles (Official Charts)	23
UK Airplay (ERA)	58
UK Dance (Music Week)	5
UK Club Chart (Music Week)	37
US Billboard Hot 100	65
US Dance Club Songs (Billboard)	14
US Hot R&B/Hip-Hop Songs (Billboard)	74
US Maxi-Singles Sales (Billboard)	1
US Radio Songs (Billboard)	74
US Cash Box Top 100	67
