= Jump Around =

1992 single by House of Pain

Single by House of Pain

from the album House of Pain (Fine Malt Lyrics)
- B-side: "House of Pain Anthem"
- Released: May 5, 1992
- Genre: Hip hop
- Length: 3:37
- Label: Tommy Boy; XL
- Songwriters: Lawrence Muggerud; Erik Schrody
- Producer: DJ Muggs

House of Pain singles chronology
"Jump Around" (1992)	"Shamrocks and Shenanigans (Boom Shalock Lock Boom)" (1992)

Music video
- "Jump Around" on YouTube

"Jump Around" is a song by American hip hop group House of Pain, produced by DJ Muggs of Cypress Hill, who has also covered the song, and was released in May 1992 by Tommy Boy and XL as the first single from their debut album, House of Pain (Fine Malt Lyrics) (1992). The song is popular among dancehall DJs and is widely regarded in the United Kingdom as a club classic. Its music video was filmed in New York City, featuring footage from the 1992 Saint Patrick's Day parade.

The song became a hit, reaching number three in the United States. A 1993 re-release of the song in the United Kingdom, where the initial release had been a minor hit, peaked at number eight. "Jump Around" was ranked at position 580 on Q Magazine's "1001 Best Songs Ever", number 24 on VH1's "100 Greatest Songs of the 90s", number 66 on VH1's "100 Greatest Songs of Hip Hop", number 325 on Blender's "500 Greatest Songs Since You Were Born" and number 47 on NME's "100 Best Songs of the 1990s".

== Background ==
DJ Muggs has stated that he originally produced the beat for Cypress Hill, but rapper B-Real could not come up with the lyrics. It was subsequently offered to Ice Cube, who refused it, before finally being taken and used by House of Pain. The lyric "if your girl steps up, I'm smackin the ho'" brought accusations of misogyny in 2014.

=== Samples ===
The song features a distinctive horn fanfare intro, sampled from Bob & Earl's 1963 track "Harlem Shuffle". The song also samples "Popeye the Hitchhiker" by Chubby Checker, but it is best known for a high-pitched squealing sound that appears at the beginning of almost every bar—66 times in the course of the recording.

==== Controversy ====
The origin of the squeal has been the subject of debate. In a 2006 interview with Seattle Weekly, Divine Styler's article mentions sampling the same squeal 'Jump Around' used for his single "Ain't Sayin' Nothin", Complex also noted this potential connection with "Ain't Sayin' Nothin" in 2012.

American blogger Anil Dash and musician Questlove of hip-hop band The Roots have insisted on Prince's "Gett Off" as the source, while WhoSampled had listed Junior Walker and the All Stars' "Shoot Your Shot" as the source. In 2016, a Newsweek reader performed a spectrogram analysis, which revealed that the sample more closely matched "Shoot Your Shot", and House of Pain member Everlast himself told Questlove that it was a horn making the squeal and not Prince. However, Anil Dash claimed the band denied that the sample was Prince to avoid paying royalties to the singer. Prince never commented on the matter. The Prince connection was also noted in a performance by Bruno Mars using 'Gett Off' and 'Jump Around' together for a dance routine with his single "Finesse" at the 2018 Grammy Awards.

For his part, DJ Muggs said the sample came from neither Prince nor Junior Walker; the Financial Times has speculated that this is in order to avoid licensing fees. In 2020, Everlast stated that the sample came from Divine Styler's "Ain't Sayin' Nothin", which samples "Shoot Your Shot".

== Music video ==
The accompanying music video for "Jump Around" was filmed during the 1992 New York City Saint Patrick's Day parade. Portions were shot on the parade route as well as in Central Park and Old Town Bar and Restaurant. New York Yankees super fan and Yankee Stadium regular Freddy Schuman can be seen in the parade crowd, ringing his signature shamrock pan near the end of the video. The video ends with a dedication to the memory of Matt Champy, a friend of the band who died in 1992.

== Reception ==
In the United States, "Jump Around" peaked at number three on both the Billboard Hot 100 and Cash Box Top 100, while reaching number five on the Billboard Hot Rap Songs chart and number 17 on the Billboard Dance Club Songs chart. In Canada, the single hit number seven on the RPM Dance/Urban chart and number 45 on the RPM Top Singles chart. In Europe, it entered the top 10 in Ireland, the Netherlands and the United Kingdom. In the latter, "Jump Around" peaked at number eight in its second run on the UK Singles Chart, on May 23, 1993. Additionally, it was a top-30 hit in Belgium and Sweden, as well as on the Eurochart Hot 100, where it peaked at number 30 in June 1993. In Oceania, the single peaked at numbers 15 and 31 in Australia and New Zealand, respectively. In West Asia, it became a top-30 hit in Israel, peaking at number 24 on 3 November 1992. "Jump Around" earned a gold record in Australia and double platinum in the UK, with a sale of 35,000 and 1,200,000 singles, respectively. In the US, it earned a platinum record, when 1 million units were sold there.

J. D. Considine for Schenectady, New York's The Daily Gazette described the song as "springy" and Scott Sterling from The Michigan Daily called it the "most happening track" on the House of Pain album. Bill Wyman from Entertainment Weekly said, "It's a charging dance number based on a sampled snatch of bagpipe." Another EW editor, Leah Greenblatt, wrote that "the first and only members of hip-hop's Irish-American Thug Life Hall of Fame earned their spot in that (imaginary) pantheon with this killer blast of rapid-fire rap bravado." Brian A. Samson from the Gavin Report commented that "this uptempo single provides listeners with what H.O.P. calls "fine malt lyrics." Laced with squeaky buzzes that sounds like of a clarinet played by a novice, the beats should provide for some head-noddin' action."

Across the Atlantic, Dublin-based Evening Herald declared it as a "compelling single", while the Irish Independent said the group had "made a fairly groovy record." Stephen Trousse from Melody Maker wrote that it "has already achieved a frightening ubiquity, becoming 1992's evil twin hip hop hit to Arrested Development's 'People Everyday'". Music Week's RM Dance Update complimented it as an "excellent debut", noting that "built on a chugging Caribbean rhythm, 'Jump Around' features a strong Heavy D-like rap and its popularity is ensured by a chanted chorus with the buzz word 'Jump'. With a sleeve festooned with shamrock leaves and an Irish flag, it seems Tommy Boy may have beaten Talkin' Loud in the race to give us Irish rap." An editor, Andy Beevers, called it "an infectious bouncy track", adding that lyrically, "their invitation to jump is as aggressive as Kris Kross's was cute." Johnny Dee from NME remarked its "fresh perkiness", praising the song as "the crispest rap biscuit of the season". Upon the 1993 re-release, he stated that it "still makes your body feel as if it was possessed by a jumping bean". Rupert Howe from Select magazine described it as a "Kris-Kross-with testosterone smash" and added that it is "an impossibly simple freestyle skank that stormed the US billboard big-time."

== Legacy ==
In 2019, About.com's Bill Lamb called "Jump Around" one of the "Top 10 Pop Songs of 1992", saying, "After one time of hearing this riveting blend of rap and rock, you will likely never forget the sampled saxophone squeal from Jr. Walker and the All Stars that leads off every bar." He also wrote, "For a brief period of time in the 1990s, it seemed that the marriage of edgy rock and hip-hop could actually become a thing. 'Jump Around' is proof that the union could either be incredibly infectious or annoying, depending on one's tolerance for the incessant siren that accompanies the pounding beats." AllMusic editor Rob Theakston named the song a "dynamite classic". He also stated that the "anthem" that got the Irish boys rolling in the first place "still sounds as timeless and energetic nearly a decade along".

NME ranked it number six in their list of "Singles of the Year" in December 1992. In 2003, Q Magazine included it in their list of "1001 Best Songs Ever". In 2012, NME featured it in their list of "100 Best Songs of the 1990s", describing the song as "irresistible, the ultimate easy floorfiller, and floor-destroyer." Time Out ranked it number 68 in their "The 100 Best Party Songs Ever Made" in July 2023. In October 2023, Billboard ranked "Jump Around" number 442 in their "Best Pop Songs of All Time", saying, "That head-nodder of a rap song with the catchy squeal that gets everyone to literally 'jump around' for the home team at sporting events, causing stadiums to shake to their foundations." In February 2024, the magazine ranked it number eight in their "The 100 Greatest Jock Jams of All Time".

== Track listings ==
1. "Jump Around" (Master mix) – 3:37
2. "Jump Around" (DJ Bizznizz remix) – 4:06
3. "Jump Around" (Pete Rock remix) – 3:56
4. "House of Pain Anthem" (Master mix) – 2:35

== Charts ==
=== Weekly charts ===
1992 weekly chart performance for "Jump Around"
Chart (1992)	Peak position
Australia (ARIA)	15
Belgium (Ultratop 50 Flanders)	28
Canada Top Singles (RPM)	45
Canada Dance/Urban (RPM)	7
Europe (Eurochart Hot 100)	30
Europe (European Dance Radio)	9
Ireland (IRMA)	9
Ireland (IRMA) with "Top o' the Morning to Ya"	6
Israel (Israeli Singles Chart)	24
Netherlands (Dutch Top 40)	12
Netherlands (Single Top 100)	10
New Zealand (Recorded Music NZ)	31
Sweden (Sverigetopplistan)	26
UK Singles (Official Charts)	32
UK Singles (Official Charts) with "Top o' the Morning to Ya"	8
UK Airplay (Music Week)	22
UK Dance (Music Week) with "Top o' the Morning to Ya"	1
UK Club Chart (Music Week)	79
US Billboard Hot 100	3
US Dance Club Play (Billboard)	17
US Hot R&B Singles (Billboard)	14
US Hot Rap Singles (Billboard)	5
US Maxi-Singles Sales (Billboard)	1
US Top 40/Rhythm-Crossover (Billboard)	13
US Cash Box Top 100	3

2004 weekly chart performance for "Jump Around"
Chart (2004)	Peak position
Ireland Dance (IRMA)	7

2012 weekly chart performance for "Jump Around"
Chart (2012)	Peak position
France (SNEP)	180

=== Year-end charts ===
1992 year-end chart performance for "Jump Around"
Chart (1992)	Position
Brazil (Crowley)	38
Netherlands (Single Top 100)	96
US Billboard Hot 100	24
US Hot R&B Singles (Billboard)	98
US Hot Rap Singles (Billboard)	25
US Maxi-Singles Sales (Billboard)	1
US Cash Box Top 100	45

1993 year-end chart performance for "Jump Around"
Chart (1993)	Position
Australia (ARIA)	97
UK Singles (OCC)	95

== Certifications ==
Certifications and sales for "Jump Around"
Region	Certification	Certified units/sales
Australia (ARIA)	Gold	35,000^{^}
Denmark (IFPI Danmark)	Gold	45,000^{‡}
Germany (BVMI)	Gold	250,000^{‡}
New Zealand (RMNZ)	4× Platinum	120,000^{‡}
United Kingdom (BPI)	2× Platinum	1,200,000^{‡}
United States (RIAA)	Platinum	1,000,000^{^}
^{^} Shipments figures based on certification alone.^{‡} Sales+streaming figures based on certification alone.

== Release history ==
Release dates and formats for "Jump Around"
Region	Date	Format(s)	Label(s)	Ref.
United States	May 5, 1992	7-inch vinyl; 12-inch vinyl; CD; cassette	Tommy Boy	
Australia	September 14, 1992	CD; cassette	Liberation; Tommy Boy	
United Kingdom	September 28, 1992	7-inch vinyl; 12-inch vinyl; CD; cassette	XL	
Australia	October 5, 1992	12-inch vinyl	Liberation; Tommy Boy	
United Kingdom (re-release)	May 10, 1993	12-inch vinyl; CD; cassette	XL	

== Influence and cover versions ==
On September 16, 2016, British YouTuber and rapper KSI released his own version of "Jump Around", featuring American rapper Waka Flocka Flame. In 2019, American nu metal band Coming for Blood released a cover version of "Jump Around", featuring DJ Lethal on turntables.

=== Use in sports ===
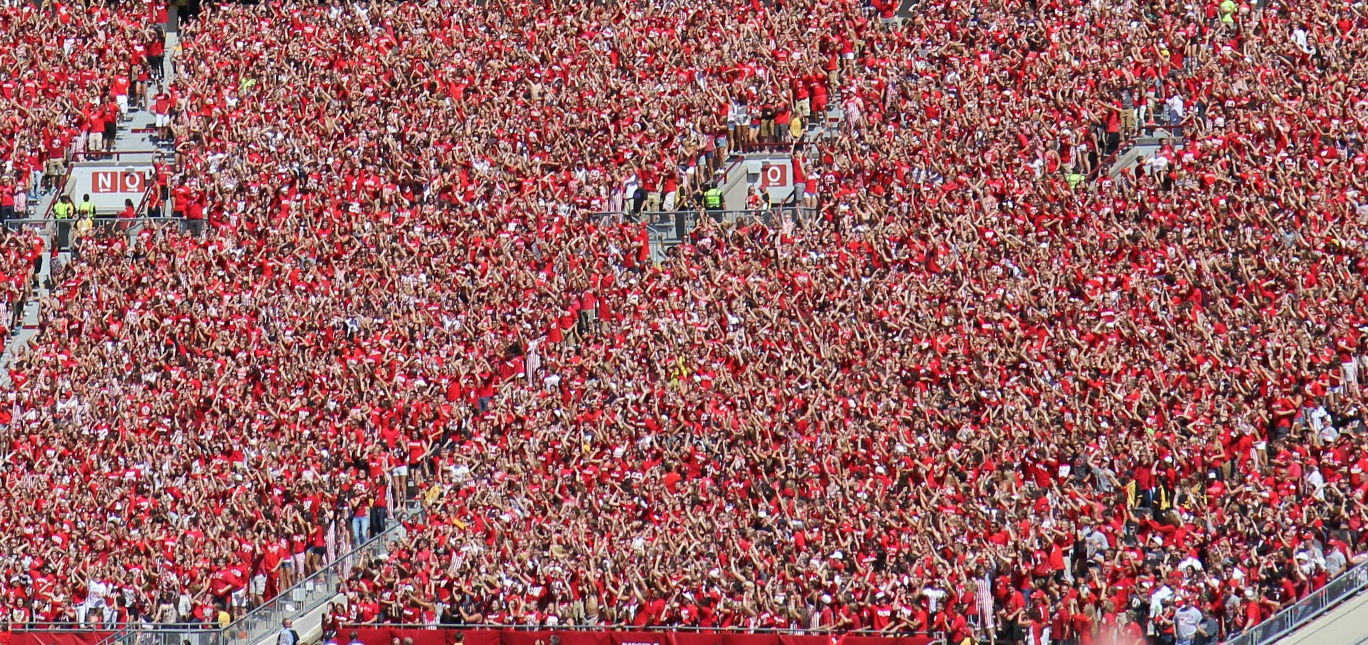
University of Wisconsin students in sections O & P at Camp Randall Stadium jumping around and dancing in 2014 to "Jump Around"

At home football games at the University of Wisconsin–Madison, students "Jump Around" to the song between the third and fourth quarters. It stirred up fans and players and eventually became a tradition. The song's title is displayed on unofficial Wisconsin Badgers clothing and apparel, along with the credit/debit cards of the university's employee/student/alumni credit union. The song is sometimes associated with Wisconsin more broadly: for example, it was played during the 2024 Democratic National Convention roll call when Wisconsin's delegates cast their votes to nominate Kamala Harris as the presidential candidate.

Professional wrestlers J. C. Ice and Wolfie D, collectively known as PG-13, used a censored version of the song as their entrance to the rings.

The song appears in the 1996 golf film Happy Gilmore during a highlights sequence, and in Happy Gilmore 2 during a Maxi Golf scene.

Two time Darts World Champion Gary Anderson from Scotland uses this song as his walk on music.
