= Who's the Man? =

- Theatrical release poster
- Directed by: Ted Demme
- Screenplay by: Seth Greenland
- Story by: Doctor Dré; Ed Lover; Seth Greenland
- Produced by: Grace Blake
- Starring: Doctor Dré; Ed Lover; Ice-T
- Cinematography: Adam Kimmel
- Edited by: Jeffrey Wolf; John Gilroy
- Music by: Michael Wolff; Nic. tenBroek
- Production companies: Tin Pan Apple de Passe Entertainment; Thomas Entertainment
- Distributed by: New Line Cinema
- Release date: April 23, 1993
- Running time: 90 minutes
- Country: United States
- Language: English
- Budget: $4 million
- Box office: $11.2 million

Who's the Man? is a 1993 American thriller buddy cop comedy film directed by Ted Demme in his feature film directing debut. The film stars Yo! MTV Raps hosts Doctor Dré (in his film debut) and Ed Lover alongside Ice-T and features cameo appearances from some of the top rap/hip-hop acts of the time.

== Plot ==
Doctor Dré and Ed Lover are two bumbling barbers at a Harlem barbershop. Knowing full well that cutting hair is not their calling, their boss, friend, and mentor Nick (Jim Moody) tells the two maybe they should try out for the police academy. They refuse at first, but Nick threatens them with unemployment. Crazily enough, it works out for the two, and they are accepted on the New York City police force. Things seem to be going well for them, when tragedy suddenly strikes, and they lose Nick and the barbershop. Now enforcers of the law, the team decides to investigate the incident, which they believe to be a murder.

Ed and Dre find out through the streets that a crooked land developer named Demetrius (Richard Bright) might have had something to do with their friend's death, and proceed to attempt to dig up as much dirt on him as possible. This proves to be difficult, however, when they've got an angry Sergeant (Denis Leary), a moody detective (Rozwill Young), and a bunch of unwilling street hoods (Guru, Ice-T) to go through to get the information they need. Though there aren't any certain clues to be found, strange happenings are certainly going on, as the cops found out that Demetrius' company seems to be looking for oil rather than looking for property.

With their superiors not believing Ed and Dre's story and getting themselves in trouble, they end up being suspended. However, they get a lead to a warehouse where they find a lot of guns. They have enough evidence to arrest Demetrius, but Demetrius didn't kill Nick. It was revealed that Nick's friend, Lionel, who was working for Demetrius had murdered him because Nick refused to sell his shop. Ed and Dre have Lionel arrested.

Ed and Dre are offered their jobs back, but decided to quit, stating it's too violent for them. When they return to their old barbershop they discover oil coming from the floor. Soon after, they're back in business re-opening the place giving customers bad haircuts.

== Cast ==
- Doctor Dré as Himself
- Ed Lover as Himself
- Badja Djola as Lionel Douglas
- Cheryl "Salt" James as Teesha Braxton
- Colin Quinn as Frankie Flynn
- Denis Leary as Sergeant Cooper
- Bernie Mac as George "G-George"
- Terrence Howard as Costumer
- Richard Gant as Albert
- Guru as Martin Lorenzo
- Ice-T as Chauncey "Nighttrain" Jackson
- Larry Cedar as Officer Barnes
- Jim Moody as Nick Crawford
- George T. Odom as Albert
- Joe Lisi as Captain Reilly
- Karen Duffy as Officer Day
- Roger Robinson as Charlie
- Richard Bright as Demetrius
- Leslie Segar as Sheneequa
- Rozwill Young as Bo Griles
- Vinny Pastore as Tony "Clams" Como
- Tony Lip as Vito Pasquale
- Caron Bernstein as Kelly
- Kim Chan as Fuji

=== Cameo appearances ===
- B-Fine as Club Guy #1
- B-Real as Jose
- Apache as Bubba Worker #1
- Ashanti as Kid #4
- Bill Bellamy as K.K.
- Big Bub as Roscoe
- Bow-Legged Lou as "Forty"
- Bushwick Bill as Bar Vagrant
- Busta Rhymes as Jawaan
- Angelo Montagnese as The Manno
- Michael Giordano as Not the Manno
- Chi-Ali as Drew
- CL Smooth as Robber #2
- Danny Boy as Steve
- Del the Funkee Homosapien as Kid #1
- D-Nice as Male Nurse
- DJ Lethal as Mike
- D.J. Wiz as Test Taker #1
- Dres as Malik
- Eric B. as Robber #5
- Everlast as Billy
- Fab 5 Freddy as Himself
- Flavor Flav as Himself
- Freddie Foxxx as The Bartender
- Gavin O'Connor as Police Drill Man
- Heavy D as Himself
- House of Pain as Card Players
- Humpty Hump as Club Doorman
- Kid Capri as Himself
- King Sun as Haircut Guy
- Kool G Rap as Guy in Barbershop Chair
- Kris Kross as Karim / Micah
- KRS-One as Rashid
- Kurt Loder as The Hitman
- Leaders of the New School as Passengers in Jeep
- Lin Que Ayoung as Female Nurse
- Mark Sexx as Guy at Bar
- Melle Mel as Delroy
- Monie Love as Vanessa
- Naughty By Nature as Themselves
- Nikki D as Protester
- Pete Rock as Robber #1
- Penny Hardaway as Darryl
- Phife Dawg as Gerald
- Queen Latifah as Herself
- Run-D.M.C. as Detectives
- Sandra "Pepa" Denton as Sherise
- Scottie Pippen as Raymond
- Showbiz & A.G. as Test Taker #2 / Test Taker #3
- Smooth B as Bubba Worker #2
- Stretch as Benny
- Taji and Qu'ran Goodman as Kid #2 / Kid #3
- Yo-Yo as Woman

== Production ==
Doctor Dré and Ed Lover personally requested Ted Demme direct the film as Love and Demme had been friends since school and had a good working relationship with him on the show Yo! MTV Raps. Demme secured other prominent hip-hop artist for roles in the film who agreed to work for scale as a favor to Demme. Demme credited his time on MTV with the production going as smoothly as it did as the network gave him plenty of opportunities to experiment as well as making industry connections.

== Reception ==
Rotten Tomatoes gives the film a score of 56% based on reviews from 9 critics.

Roger Ebert gives a favorable review, with a score of 3 stars out of 4.

== Soundtrack ==
A soundtrack containing hip hop music was released on April 20, 1993, through MCA Records. It peaked at #32 on the Billboard 200 and #8 on the Top R&B/Hip-Hop Albums.
