= House of Pain =

American hardcore hip-hop group

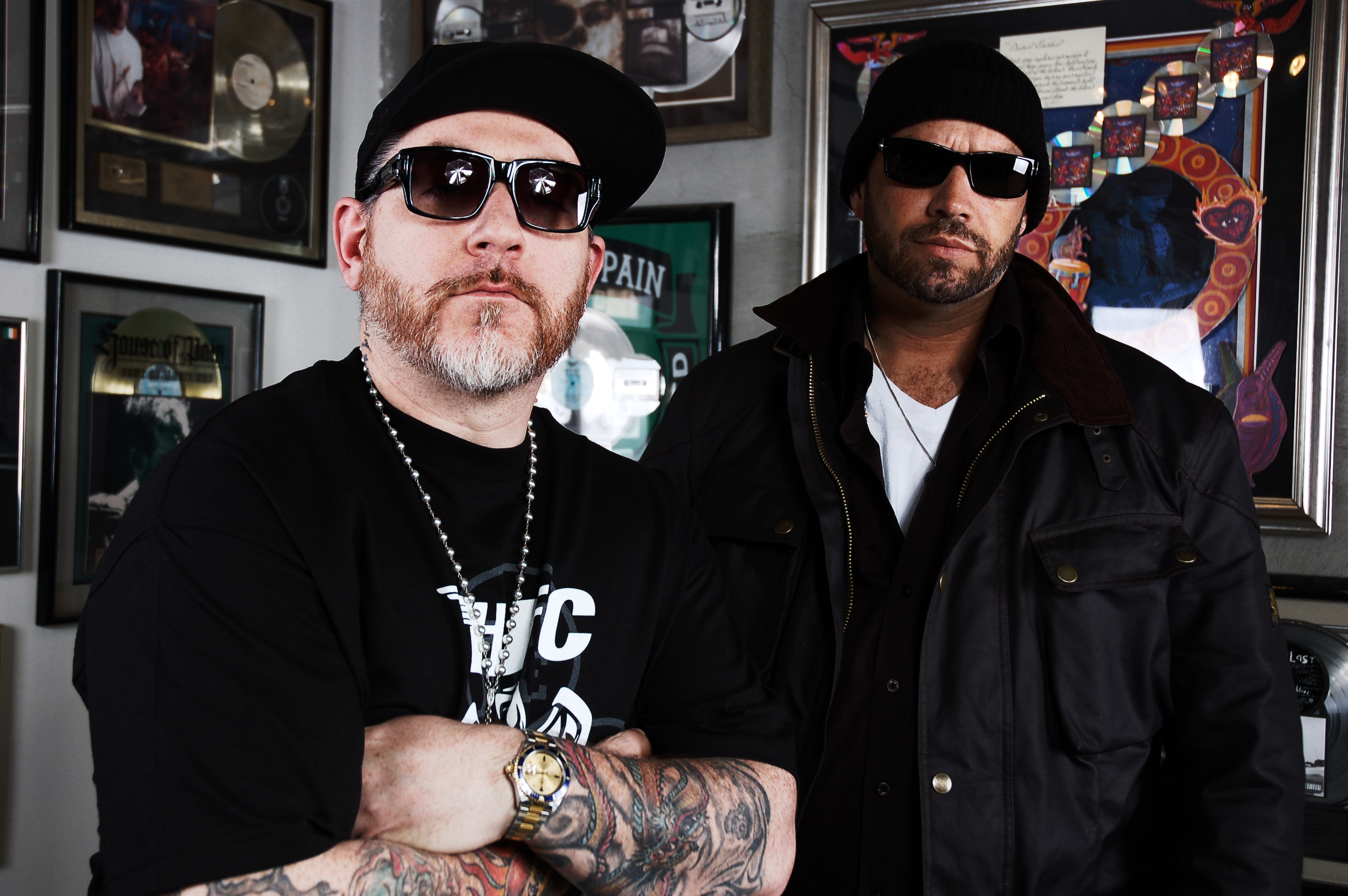
- Everlast and Danny Boy in 2011

Background information
- Origin: Los Angeles, California, U.S.
- Genres: Hardcore hip-hop; Irish rap
- Years active: 1990–1996; 2010–2011; 2017
- Label: Tommy Boy
- Past members: Everlast; Danny Boy; DJ Lethal

House of Pain was an American hardcore hip-hop trio. They are also regarded as pioneers of Irish rap due to their Celtic aesthetics. Consisting of DJ Lethal, Danny Boy and Everlast, they released three albums: House of Pain (1992), Same as It Ever Was (1994) and Truth Crushed to Earth Shall Rise Again (1996). They are best known for their 1992 hit single "Jump Around", which reached number 3 in the United States, number 6 in Ireland, and number 8 in the United Kingdom.

The group broke up in 1996 but reunited briefly in 2010 for a world tour and in 2017. Lead rapper Everlast went on to pursue a solo career and was a member of the supergroup La Coka Nostra, which also featured DJ Lethal. DJ Lethal would later join and find commercial success with the nu metal band Limp Bizkit.

== Band history ==
=== 1990–1992: Formation and breakthrough ===
In 1990, Daniel O'Connor (Danny Boy O'Connor) got together with fellow rapper Erik Schrody (Everlast), who had just released a rap album called Forever Everlasting (1990), which did not have much success. O'Connor knew Schrody when he went to William Howard Taft High School in Woodland Hills, California (1984–1986), and various hip-hop events they attended in their teens. Both of Irish American descent, they decided to make a hip-hop group with this identity. While hanging out at O'Connor's home, Schrody noticed a cassette with the title House of Pain, which was a demo of a Punk group O'Connor tried to put together. Schrody really liked the name and felt they should reuse it as their name. Schrody brought in his former DJ Leor Dimant (DJ Lethal), who is of Latvian descent, and House of Pain was created. Schrody would become the lead rapper, while O'Connor acted as the hype man, second emcee, art director and the graphic artist of the group. After they recorded a demo, for which O'Connor designed the cover, that created a bidding war among labels. The label they chose was Tommy Boy Records, who credited O'Connor's artwork with having initially caught their attention.

In 1992, House of Pain released their debut album House of Pain, subtitled Fine Malt Lyrics. Their first single "Jump Around" was a major hit. In the United States, it peaked at number 3 on the Billboard Hot 100, while reaching number 5 on the Hot Rap Songs, 13 on Rhythmic Top 40, 1 on Hot Dance Music/Maxi-Singles Sales, number 17 on the Billboard Dance Club Songs, and is certified platinum. The song was produced by Lawrence Muggerud (DJ Muggs) and performed by Schrody. Both Muggerud and Schrody knew each other since Rhyme Syndicate. Muggerud, who had a beat he had submitted to various artists, eventually invited Schrody to give it a try. Schrody wrote lyrics in his driveway; being influenced by dance hall singer Shabba Ranks, part of the lyrics were "Jump around, if you love freedom. Jump around, if you love culture", which Muggerud suggested they trim down to "Jump Around". While re-working his lyrics, Muggerud came up with the iconic horn that accompanies the song. Their second single "Shamrocks and Shenanigans (Boom Shalock Lock Boom)" peaked at 65 on the Billboard Hot 100, 75 on the Hot R&B/Hip-Hop Songs, 14 on the Dance Club Songs, and 74 on Radio Songs. The album peaked at 14 on the Billboard 200, 14 on the U.S. Billboard Top Current Albums, 16 on the U.S. Billboard Top R&B/Hip-Hop Albums, 14 on the U.S. Billboard Top Album Sales, and is certified platinum.

=== 1993–1996: Subsequent success and group's breakup ===
In 1993, they were among the rap artists who had cameo roles in Ted Demme's film Who's the Man?. For this project they provided a theme song by the same name, which was also used as a single for the soundtrack and their subsequent album. It rose to number 97 on the Billboard Hot 100, 77 on the Hot R&B/Hip-Hop Singles & Tracks, and 10 on the US Billboard Hot Dance Music/Maxi-Singles Sales. Also that year, they participated together with Helmet, along with several other rap acts, on the 1993 rap rock collaborative Judgment Night film soundtrack.

In 1994, they released Same as It Ever Was. The album peaked at 12 equally on the Billboard 200, the U.S. Billboard Top Current Albums, the U.S. Billboard Top R&B/Hip-Hop Albums, the U.S. Billboard Top Album Sales, and is certified gold. AllMusic gave it four out five stars. Matt Carlson of The Michigan Daily found the album quite good and noted "the music is laid back with some heavy driving forces underlying and strengthening it". J.D. Constantine of The Baltimore Sun did not like album and found it monotonous and unimaginative. Roger Catlin of the Hartford Courant said that while finding the continuity monotonous it's "hard and compelling" as well as a "strong outing". Andrew Love of The Ocala Star-Banner gave it four stars saying "this is a band that has definitely progressed over the course of one album". Music critic Robert Christgau, who did not like their previous and subsequent album, gave it an A− and described it as "the hardest hip-hop of the year".

In 1996, they released Truth Crushed to Earth Shall Rise Again. The album peaked at 47 on the Billboard 200, 47 on the U.S. Billboard Top Current Albums, 31 on the U.S. Billboard Top R&B/Hip-Hop Albums, and 47 on the U.S. Billboard Top Album Sales. At the release party, Schrody decided to disband the group. Sputnikmusic wrote that "the trio’s most rounded, consistent & memorable LP is grossly under-appreciated." Dave Ferman of the Fort Worth Star-Telegram gave it one star and a half, calling it a "woeful mess". Steve Juon of RapReviews gave it a seven out of ten. AllMusic music gave it two point five stars out of five.

=== 1997–present day: solo projects and reunions ===
From then on, the members continued their separate careers. Schrody achieved multi-platinum solo fame in 1998 with his album Whitey Ford Sings the Blues, where he developed a style that blended rap with acoustic guitar, as well as singing.

Dimant became the DJ of multi-platinum nu metal band Limp Bizkit.

O'Connor did some freelance work designing clothes, and was involved in several music projects.

In late 2004, the creation of the rap supergroup La Coka Nostra started when O'Connor was mentoring young artists. He took notice of two up and comers which included George Carroll (Slaine) and brought them to meet his former DJ from House of Pain, Leor Dimant, who at the time was working on a compilation album and championing a new artist as well. They decided to make a group and asked O'Connor to become a member as a hype man and art director. After accepting, O'Connor felt that there was a void and asked experienced rapper William Braunstein (Ill Bill) to join. The group's name came about, when O'Connor teased Carroll and Braunstein with that nickname, after they both had a night out. The group started releasing music on MySpace, and went viral. Eventually, O'Connor received a letter from former House of Pain colleague Erik Schrody, who asked if he could join. By 2006, the group consisted of O'Connor, Carroll, Dimant, Braunstein, and Schrody.

In 2009, La Coka Nostra released A Brand You Can Trust was released on July 14, 2009, on Suburban Noize Records. It sold over 500,000 units. AllMusic gave four out of five stars. Andrew Kameka of HipHopDX wrote that "the album is a mostly solid effort and exactly what someone would expect from a supergroup of like-minded members known for high-energy music". Adam Kennedy of the BBC while praising some the moments of the album said "it’s a tantalising parting taste of potential capabilities, yet until they improve a customer satisfaction hit rate that barely troubles one in three tunes here". Steve Juon of RapReviews gave it a seven out of ten. Sputnikmusic described it as "a disjointed effort, but still pretty decent in and of itself and gave it three point five out of five. Thomas Quinlan of Exclaim! said "La Coka Nostra are an interesting collection of collaborators that live up to the hype".

On March 2, 2012, it was announced that Schrody would be leaving La Coka Nostra due to his daughter's medical issues, while O'Connor and Dimant pursued two more project with the group Masters of the Dark Arts (2012) and To Thine Own Self Be True (2016).

House of Pain reunited at a private event held by UFC president Dana White in Boston on St. Patrick's Day 2009. It was officially announced on August 10, 2010, that House of Pain had reunited and performed their first "official" show in a decade at the second annual Epicenter music festival in Fontana, California, on September 25, 2010. Though Dimant is still a member of the group, he did not join them on their 2011 reunion tour due to prior obligations with Limp Bizkit. In April–May 2011 House of Pain attended the Groovin' the Moo touring festival in Australia, and also performed at Scotland's T in the Park festival on July 9, 2011, as well as Sonisphere UK Festival on July 12 of the same year.

House of Pain reunited in 2017 for a 25th Anniversary Tour. The tour included shows in DC, Ohio, Pennsylvania, New York, Massachusetts, and California.

Between reunions and projects together, Schrody continues with his solo career, while Dimant still works with Limp Bizkit, and in 2019 O'Connor opened The Outsiders House Museum dedicated to both the novel and the film The Outsiders.

== Discography ==
- House of Pain (1992)
- Same as It Ever Was (1994)
- Truth Crushed to Earth Shall Rise Again (1996)
