= DJ Lethal =

Latvian-American disc jockey (born 1972)

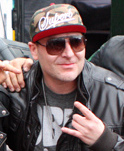
- DJ Lethal in 2012

Background information
- Born: Leors Dimants; December 18, 1972 (age 53); Riga, Latvian SSR, Soviet Union
- Genres: Hip-hop; electronic; nu metal
- Occupations: DJ; musician; record producer
- Instruments: Keyboards; turntables; sampler
- Years active: 1989–present
- Labels: Tommy Boy; Atlantic; Interscope; Geffen; Lethal Dose
- Member of: Limp Bizkit; La Coka Nostra
- Formerly of: House of Pain

Leor Dimant (Latvian: Leors Dimants, Russian: Леор Григорьевич Димант, [lʲɪˈor grʲɪˈɡorʲjɪvʲɪd͡ʑ‿dʲɪˈmant]; born December 18, 1972), better known as DJ Lethal, is a Latvian-American DJ, musician, and record producer, best known as a member of the groups House of Pain and Limp Bizkit.

== Early life ==
Leor Dimant was born to a Latvian-Jewish family in Riga, when it was part of the Soviet Union. His first contact with music was through his father Grigory "Grisha" Dimant (1951–2007), who performed in a rock band with his friends as a guitarist.

In 1976 when Dimant was four, he and his family emigrated to Italy, where they remained for a year until they obtained a visa. His parents chose to move to the New York area. There, his father performed in various Russian clubs and restaurants, mostly in Brighton Beach.

Dimant and his parents lived in Jersey City, New Jersey for some time. They moved to Los Angeles in 1987, where his father got a job at a new Russian restaurant. His first introduction to hip-hop was in Jersey City, when his school held a talent show with several students performing a rap song, and Dimant was amazed. Once he moved to Los Angeles, he quickly became interested in hip hop culture, including breakdancing and graffiti. Before learning to DJ, he started off as a beatboxer. He later practiced DJing using his friend's turntables and mixer.

== Career ==
=== Everlast and House of Pain ===
In the late 1980s, Dimant became friends with a rapper who, at that time, dated rapper Everlast. When Everlast was about to go on a European tour with Ice-T and Rhyme Syndicate, he mentioned that he would like to hear Dimant beatbox, and they met. Everlast was impressed by his beatboxing skills, and he invited Dimant to be his DJ on the upcoming tour. Dimant, who was only 16 at the time, decided to do so and dropped out of school.

After the tour, in 1990, Everlast's first solo album, including a track featuring scratching by Dimant, was released to both critical and commercial failure.

Following that, Everlast and Dimant, now known as DJ Lethal, decided to start a group, and with the addition of Everlast's high school friend Danny Boy, House of Pain was formed. The group's 1992 self-titled debut album went multi-platinum and is best known for the DJ Muggs-produced hit single "Jump Around" and the DJ Lethal-produced "Shamrocks and Shenanigans". A second album was released in 1994.

In 1996, on the eve of the release of the group's third album, produced by Everlast and DJ Lethal, things began to go sour. DJ Lethal claims it started to become a hassle, and simply was not fun anymore. The day the album was released, the group broke up.

=== Limp Bizkit ===
On House of Pain's final tour, Limp Bizkit, an up-and-coming band from Jacksonville, Florida was hired as a supporting act. DJ Lethal and the band became friends, and later, Limp Bizkit hired him to do some work on their recordings, eventually asking him if he wanted to join them. DJ Lethal accepted the offer, and the band became one of the most popular nu metal groups during the late 90s and early 2000s, selling more than 40 million records worldwide.

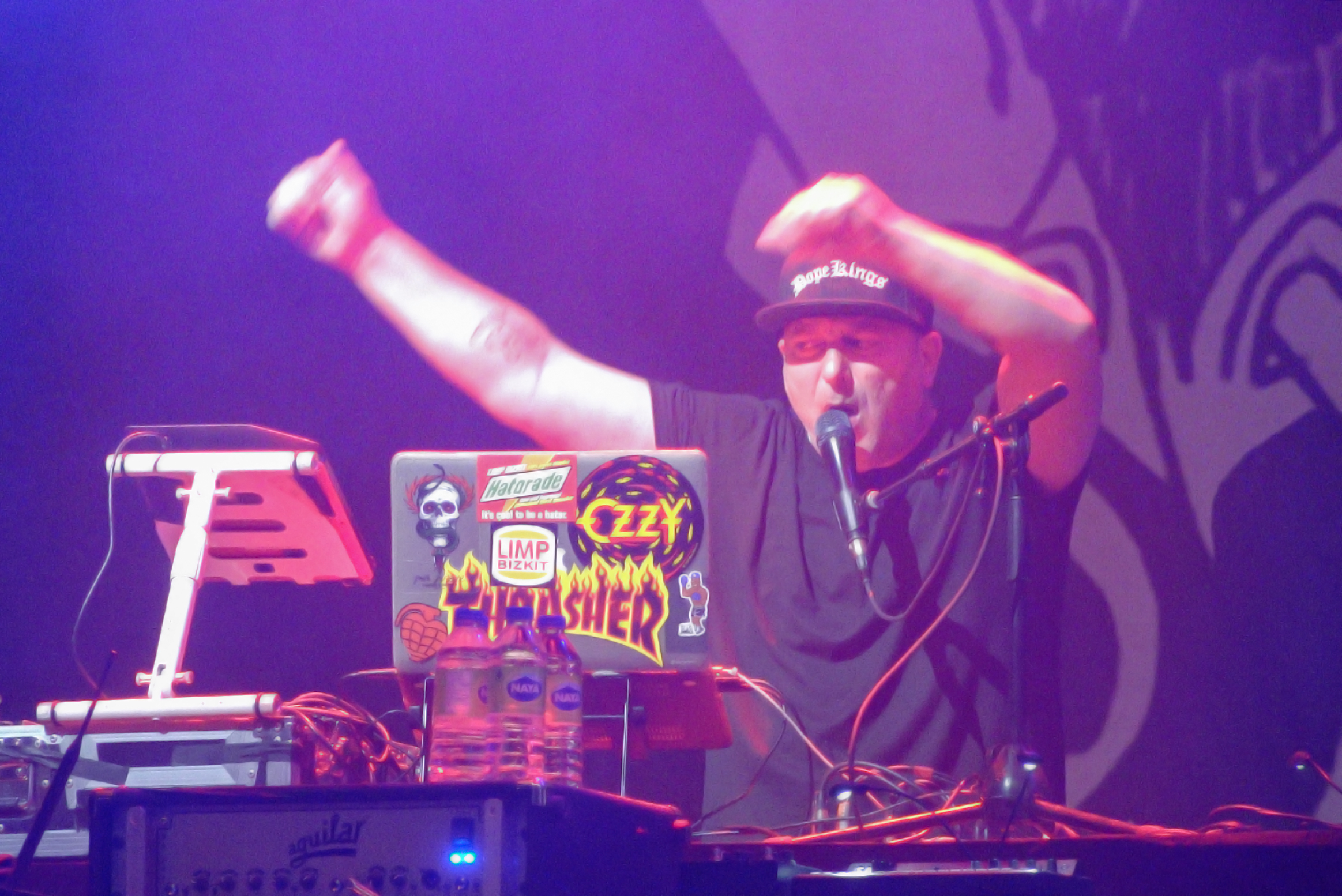
DJ Lethal performing with Limp Bizkit at Québec Agora Fest 2019

DJ Lethal wanted his contributions to the band recordings to be more original than typical DJs in bands at the time. "There are a couple of other rock bands that have DJs and they're just like, [mimics a chirp scratch] 'Hey, what's going on? Let me spin around a couple of times and show off that I can spin two records.' So I definitely knew I didn't want to be just another DJ in a rock band. I wanted to be another instrument—a part of the band, like another guitar player."

On March 17, 2018, five years after his departure from the band, DJ Lethal reunited with Limp Bizkit on stage during a concert in New Zealand. He later announced through Twitter that he had officially rejoined Limp Bizkit.

=== Features ===
Besides the work with his groups, DJ Lethal is producing records in his Hollywood based studio, working for artists such as Scott Harris, and is also preparing his long-delayed solo album, which is set to feature will.i.am, Ol' Dirty Bastard, Chester Bennington, Kurupt, Cypress Hill, Redman, Tha Alkaholiks, Adil Omar, Rock of Heltah Skeltah, Pharoahe Monch, Chino XL, Diamond D, Dilated Peoples, Yung Berg, Method Man, Streetlife, Talib Kweli, Bun B and more, along with his La Coka Nostra bandmates.

=== Career timeline ===
- House Of Pain (1991–1996)
- La Coka Nostra (2006–present)
- Limp Bizkit (1996–2012, 2012–2013, 2018–present)

== Personal life ==
In a 2009 interview with the Latvian newspaper Diena, Dimant professed to still feeling "Latvian" despite his many years in the USA. This connection stems from the fact that he was born there, and has a grandmother, other relatives, and many friends of the family there. He mentions Laima Vaikule as an important family friend who encouraged him to maintain contacts with the country of his birth.

During his early years growing up in Riga, Dimant spoke mainly Russian at home and at school. He says his parents could speak Latvian, but did not want their son to learn it, so that they could have private conversations without him being able to understand. Nevertheless, Dimant can still recall several phrases in Latvian, such as "Nevajag viņam!" ('He doesn't need [it] !').

== Partial discography ==
- Everlast – Forever Everlasting (1990)
- Funkdoobiest – Which Doobie U B? (1993)
- Sugar Ray – Lemonade and Brownies (1995)
- Funkdoobiest – Brothas Doobie (1995)
- Sepultura – Roots (1996)
- Biohazard – Mata Leão (1996)
- Tura Satana (aka Manhole) – All Is Not Well (1996)
- Soulfly – Soulfly (1998)
- Videodrone – Videodrone (1999)
- Powerman 5000 – Tonight the Stars Revolt! – Good Times Roll (1999)
- Coal Chamber – Chamber Music (1999)
- Dope – Felons and Revolutionaries (1999)
- Rob Zombie – American Made Music to Strip By (1999)
- Run-DMC – Crown Royal (2001)
- Kurupt – Space Boogie: Smoke Oddessey (2001)
- Rob Zombie – The Sinister Urge (2001)
- Dope – Life (2001)
- Professional Murder Music – Professional Murder Music (2001)
- Shihad – Pacifier (2002)
- Slaine – The White Man Is the Devil Vol 1 (2005)
- Street Drum Corps – Street Drum Corps (2006)
- DMC – Checks Thugs and Rock n Roll (2006)
- Dead Celebrity Status – Blood Music (2006)
- Jamie Kennedy & Stu Stone – Blowin' Up (Theme music) (2006)
- Main Flow – The Flowfessionals (2006)
- Evanescence – The Open Door (2006)
- Ill Bill – Ill Bill Is the Future Vol. II: I'm a Goon! (2006)
- Street Drum Corps – We Are Machines (2008)
- Ill Bill – The Hour of Reprisal (2008)
- Adil Omar – The Mushroom Cloud Effect (2012)
- Vinnie Paz – God of the Serengeti (2012)
- La Coka Nostra – To Thine Own Self Be True (2016)

== Accolades ==
Year	Nominee / work	Award	Result	Ref.
2000	"Take a Look Around (Theme from M:i-2)"	Grammy Award for Best Hard Rock Performance	Nominated	
1999	"Nookie"	Grammy Award for Best Hard Rock Performance	Nominated	
1999	Significant Other	Grammy Award for Best Rock Album	Nominated	
1992	"Jump Around"	Grammy Award for Best Rap Performance by a Duo or Group	Nominated	
