= List of awards and nominations received by Santana =

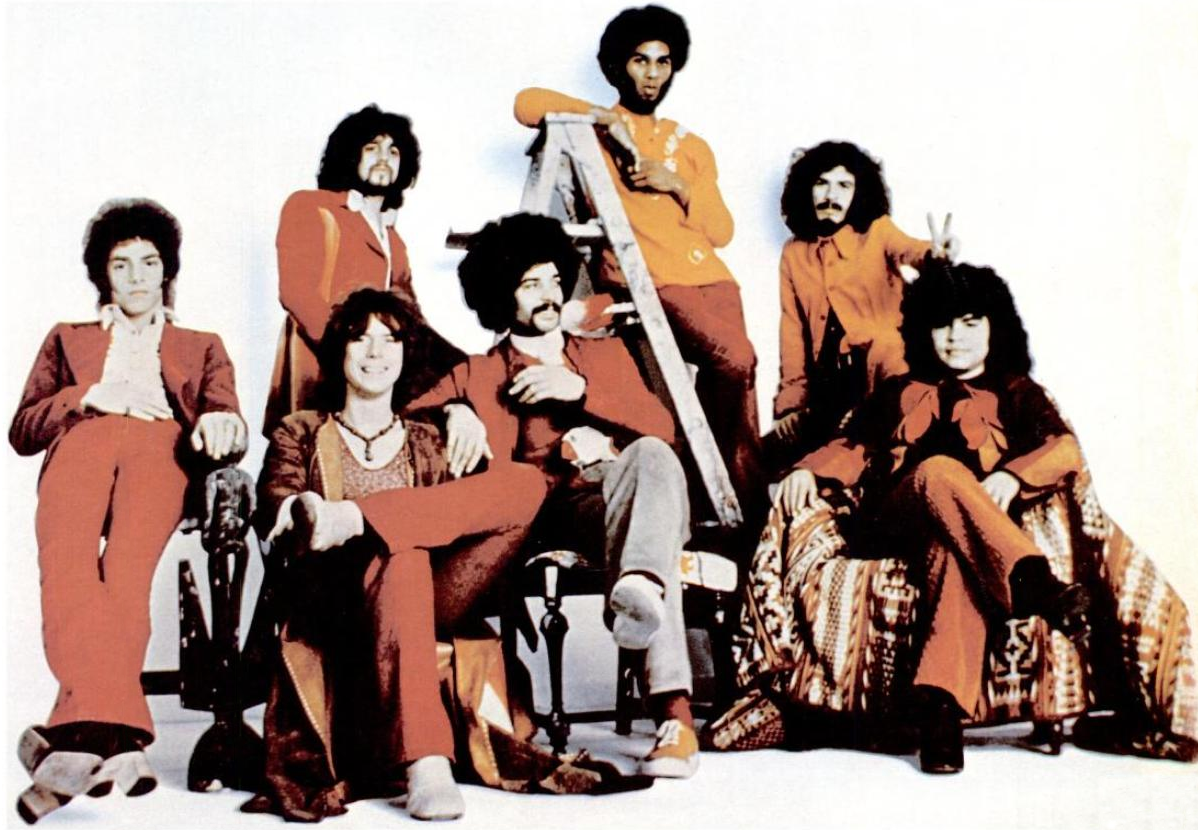
- Santana in 1971
Awards and nominations
Award	Wins	Nominations
American Music Awards	1	2
APRA Awards	1	1
Billboard Latin Music Awards	2	6
Billboard Music Awards	0	7
Blockbuster Entertainment Awards	1	0
Brit Awards	0	1
Grammy Awards	8	12
Latin American Music Awards	0	2
Latin Grammy Awards	3	4
Lo Nuestro Awards	1	0
My VH1 Music Awards	1	0

Totals (Note: Certain award groups do not simply award one winner. They acknowledge several different recipients, have runners-up, and have third place. Since this is a specific recognition and is different from losing an award, runner-up mentions are considered wins in this award tally. For simplification and to avoid errors, each award in this list has been presumed to have had a prior nomination.)
- Wins: 18
- Nominations: 40

Santana is an American rock band, formed in 1967 in San Francisco by singer and guitarist Carlos Santana, who has been the band's leader throughout its career. The band has won a number of awards, including eight Grammy Awards and three Latin Grammy Awards, largely recognizing 1999's album Supernatural and the single "Smooth". The band was inducted into the Rock and Roll Hall of Fame in 1998, and Santana's works have entered the Grammy Hall of Fame and Latin Grammy Hall of Fame.

The band released its self-titled debut album in 1969. During 1973, Santana received its first nomination for a major award when its fourth album Caravanserai (1972) was nominated for the Grammy Award for Best Pop Instrumental Performance with Vocal Coloring. The band was nominated for further Grammys in 1993 and 1996. In 2000, following the success of the previous year's album Supernatural, the band was nominated for nine Grammys and won eight, tying the record held by Michael Jackson for the most awards at a single Grammy ceremony. The album won the awards for Album of the Year and Best Rock Album and the single "Smooth" received two Grammys for Record of the Year and Best Pop Collaboration with Vocals. Four other songs from the album also won Grammys. In the same year, the band received three awards at the Latin Grammy Awards, including Record of the Year.

Santana has sold more than 100 million records to date. The band's best-selling album to date is Supernatural, which has sold over 30 million copies worldwide. According to the Guinness Book of World Records, Supernatural is the best-selling album of all time by a Latin artist.

== Awards and nominations ==
Award	Year (Note: Indicates the year of ceremony. Each year is linked to the article about the awards held that year, wherever possible.)	Category	Recipients	Result	Ref(s).
American Music Awards	2000	Favorite Pop/Rock Album	Supernatural	Won	
American Music Awards	2000	Favorite Pop/Rock Band/Duo/Group	Santana	Nominated	
APRA Awards	2007	Most Performed Foreign Work	"Just Feel Better" (with Steven Tyler)	Won	
Billboard Latin Music Awards	2015	Top Latin Album of the Year	Corazón	Nominated	
Billboard Latin Music Awards	2015	Top Latin Albums Artist of the Year, Duo or Group	Santana	Won	
Billboard Latin Music Awards	2015	Latin Pop Songs Artist of the Year, Duo or Group	Santana	Nominated	
Billboard Latin Music Awards	2015	Latin Pop Album of the Year	Corazón	Nominated	
Billboard Latin Music Awards	2015	Latin Pop Albums Artist of the Year, Duo or Group	Santana	Won	
Billboard Latin Music Awards	2020	Top Latin Albums Artist of the Year, Duo or Group	Santana	Nominated	
Billboard Latin Music Awards	2020	Latin Pop Artist of the Year, Duo or Group	Santana	Nominated	
Billboard Latin Music Awards	2020	Latin Pop Albums Label of the Year	Africa Speaks	Nominated	
Billboard Music Awards	2000	Artist of the Year	Santana	Nominated	
Billboard Music Awards	2000	Hot 100 Singles Artist of the Year	Santana	Nominated	
Billboard Music Awards	2000	Albums Artist of the Year	Santana	Nominated	
Billboard Music Awards	2000	Hot 100 Singles of the Year	"Smooth" (with Rob Thomas)	Nominated	
Billboard Music Awards	2000	Hot 100 Singles of the Year	"Maria Maria" (with the Product G&B)	Nominated	
Billboard Music Awards	2000	Album of the Year	Supernatural	Nominated	
Billboard Music Awards	2015	Top Latin Album	Corazón	Nominated	
Blockbuster Entertainment Awards	2000	Favorite Artist or Group, Rock	Santana	Won	
Brit Awards	2001	International Group	Santana	Nominated	
Grammy Awards	1973	Best Pop Instrumental Performance with Vocal Coloring	Caravanserai	Nominated	
Grammy Awards	1993	Best Rock Instrumental Performance	"Gypsy/Grajonca"	Nominated	
Grammy Awards	1996	Best Rock Instrumental Performance	"Every Now and Then" (with Vernon Reid)	Nominated	
Grammy Awards	2000	Record of the Year	"Smooth" (with Rob Thomas)	Won	
Grammy Awards	2000	Best Pop Collaboration with Vocals	"Smooth" (with Rob Thomas)	Won	
Grammy Awards	2000	Album of the Year	Supernatural	Won	
Grammy Awards	2000	Best Rock Album	Supernatural	Won	
Grammy Awards	2000	Best Pop Performance by a Duo or Group with Vocal	"Maria Maria" (with the Product G&B)	Won	
Grammy Awards	2000	Best Pop Instrumental Performance	"El Farol"	Won	
Grammy Awards	2000	Best Rock Instrumental Performance	"The Calling" (with Eric Clapton)	Won	
Grammy Awards	2000	Best Rock Vocal Performance by a Duo or Group	"Put Your Lights On" (with Everlast)	Won	
Grammy Awards	2000	Best Pop Collaboration with Vocals	"Love of My Life" (with Dave Matthews & Carter Beauford)	Nominated	
Grammy Awards	2003	Best Pop Collaboration with Vocals	"The Game of Love" (with Michelle Branch)	Won	
Latin American Music Awards	2019	Album of the Year	Africa Speaks	Nominated	
Latin American Music Awards	2019	Favorite Album - Pop	Africa Speaks	Nominated	
Latin Grammy Awards	2000	Record of the Year	"Corazón Espinado" (featuring Maná)	Won	
Latin Grammy Awards	2000	Best Rock Vocal Performance, Duo or Group	"Corazón Espinado" (featuring Maná)	Won	
Latin Grammy Awards	2000	Best Pop Instrumental Performance	"El Farol"	Won	
Latin Grammy Awards	2014	Best Contemporary Pop Vocal Album	Corazón (Deluxe Edition)	Nominated	
Lo Nuestro Awards	2000	Pop Album of the Year	Supernatural	Won	
My VH1 Music Awards	2000	Your Song Kicked Ass But Was Played Too Damn Much	"Smooth"	Won	
