= Ends (song) =

1999 single by Everlast

Single by Everlast

from the album Whitey Ford Sings the Blues
- Released: March 15, 1999
- Length: 3:44 (radio edit)
- Label: Tommy Boy
- Songwriter(s): Erik Francis Schrody; Dante Ross
- Producer(s): Dante Ross; John Gamble

Everlast singles chronology
"What It's Like" (1998)	"Ends" (1999)	"So Long" (1999)

Music video
- "Ends" on YouTube

"Ends" is a song by American musician Everlast, released in 1998 via Tommy Boy Records as the second single from his sophomore studio album, Whitey Ford Sings the Blues (1998). The song was written by Everlast and Dante Ross and was produced by Ross and John Gamble. "Ends" reached number seven on the US Billboard Modern Rock Tracks chart and number 13 on the Billboard Mainstream Rock chart.

== Track listings ==
UK version
No.	Title	Writer(s)	Producer(s)	Length
1.	"Ends" (radio edit)	E. Schrody; D. Ross; C. Smith; C. Woods; D. Coles; G. Grice; J. Hunter; L. Hawkins; R. Diggs Jr.; R. Jones; I. Hayes; D. Porter	Dante Ross; John Gamble	3:44
2.	"What It's Like" (live version)	E. Schrody	Dante Ross; John Gamble	5:39
3.	"Hot to Death"	E. Schrody; M. Richardson	Divine Styler	3:49

European version
No.	Title	Writer(s)	Producer(s)	Length
1.	"Ends" (radio edit)	E. Schrody; D. Ross; C. Smith; C. Woods; D. Coles; G. Grice; J. Hunter; L. Hawkins; R. Diggs Jr.; R. Jones; I. Hayes; D. Porter	Dante Ross; John Gamble	3:44
2.	"Ends" (album version)	E. Schrody; D. Ross; C. Smith; C. Woods; D. Coles; G. Grice; J. Hunter; L. Hawkins; R. Diggs Jr.; R. Jones; I. Hayes; D. Porter	Dante Ross; John Gamble	4:26
3.	"What It's Like" (live version)	E. Schrody	Dante Ross; John Gamble	5:39

== Charts ==
=== Weekly charts ===
Chart (1999)	Peak position
Germany (GfK)	67
Scotland (OCC)	46
UK Singles (OCC)	47
US Alternative Airplay (Billboard)	7
US Mainstream Rock (Billboard)	13

=== Year-end charts ===
Chart (1999)	Position
US Mainstream Rock Tracks (Billboard)	53
US Modern Rock Tracks (Billboard)	34

== Release history ==
Region	Date	Format(s)	Label(s)	Ref.
United States	March 15, 1999	Active rock radio	Tommy Boy	
United Kingdom	June 21, 1999	CD	Tommy Boy	
