= Put Your Lights On =

1999 single by Santana

Single by Santana featuring Everlast

from the album Supernatural
- B-side: "Maria Maria"; "El farol"
- Written: February 1998
- Released: August 24, 1999
- Length: 4:45 (album version); 4:05 (radio edit)
- Label: Arista
- Songwriter: Erik Schrody
- Producers: Dante Ross; John Gamble

Santana singles chronology
"Smooth" (1999)	"Put Your Lights On" (1999)	"Maria Maria" (1999)

Everlast singles chronology
"So Long" (1999)	"Put Your Lights On" (1999)	"Black Jesus" (2000)

"Put Your Lights On" is a song by American rock band Santana and American musician Everlast from Santana's 18th studio album, Supernatural (1999). Serviced to US rock radio in August 1999, the song peaked at number 18 on the Billboard Bubbling Under Hot 100 and number eight on the Billboard Mainstream Rock Tracks chart. "Put Your Lights On" won a Grammy Award for Best Rock Performance by a Duo or Group with Vocal at the 42nd Annual Grammy Awards.

== Background ==
Everlast wrote the song while recovering from a major heart attack that he had suffered in February 1998 (directly after he completed recording his second solo album, Whitey Ford Sings the Blues). He has referred to it as "one of the most personal songs I ever wrote", stating that the song was "kind of all about hope, but it's coming from a really dark place you know, so... and really questioning a lot of your beliefs, and affirming, you know, stuff in your soul." Everlast converted to Islam in 1996, and the end of the song contains the words "La ilaha illa Allah", ("There is no God but God" in Arabic), the first part of the Shahada, the Islamic profession of faith.

Santana called Everlast in 1998, asking him if he could contribute a song for Supernatural, and Everlast suggested "Put Your Lights On". According to Everlast, Santana loved the song, and "from then on everything went very fast." Everlast has stated that he was unsure whether to include the Arabic-language portion in the recorded song, because "I did not want to sell Allah's words", but that Santana insisted that they be included.

== Track listings ==
Australian CD single

1. "Put Your Lights On" (featuring Everlast) – 4:10
2. "Smooth" (remix featuring Rob Thomas) – 3:53
3. "Maria Maria" (radio mix featuring the Product G&B) – 4:25

UK CD single

1. "Put Your Lights On" (radio edit featuring Everlast) – 4:03
2. "Maria Maria" (Spanish-English version featuring the Product G&B) – 4:15
3. "El farol" (album version) – 4:59

European CD single

1. "Put Your Lights On" (radio edit featuring Everlast) – 4:03
2. "Maria Maria" (Spanish-English version featuring the Product G&B) – 4:15

German maxi-CD single

1. "Put Your Lights On" (radio edit featuring Everlast) – 4:03
2. "Put Your Lights On" (album version featuring Everlast) – 4:47
3. "Maria Maria" (Spanish-English version featuring the Product G&B) – 4:15
4. "El farol" (album version) – 4:59

== Credits and personnel ==
Credits are taken from the German maxi-CD single liner notes and the Supernatural album booklet.

Studios

- Engineered at Fantasy Studios (Berkeley, California) and South Beach Studios (Miami Beach, Florida)
- Mixed at South Beach Studios (Miami Beach, Florida)
- Mastered at Sterling Sound (New York City)

Personnel

- Everlast – writing (as Erik Schrody), lead vocals, rhythm guitar
- Carlos Santana – lead guitar, congas, percussion
- Benny Rietveld – bass
- Chester Thompson – keyboards
- Dante Ross – production, programming
- John Gamble – production, programming, engineering
- Tom Lord-Alge – mixing
- Femio Hernandez – mixing assistance
- Steve Fontano – engineering
- Steve Farrone – engineering
- Mike Anderson – engineering assistance

== Charts ==
=== Weekly charts ===
Chart (1999–2000)	Peak position
Australia (ARIA)	32
Belgium (Ultratip Bubbling Under Wallonia)	11
Canada Top Singles (RPM)	35
Canada Adult Contemporary (RPM)	59
Canada Rock/Alternative (RPM)	5
Germany (GfK)	92
Hungary (Mahasz)	5
Poland Airplay (Music & Media)	12
Poland Airplay (PiF PaF)	7
Switzerland (Schweizer Hitparade)	87
UK Singles (Official Charts)	88
US Bubbling Under Hot 100 (Billboard)	18
US Adult Alternative Airplay (Billboard)	4
US Alternative Airplay (Billboard)	17
US Mainstream Rock Airplay (Billboard)	8

=== Year-end charts ===
Chart (1999)	Position
US Mainstream Rock Tracks (Billboard)	75
US Modern Rock Tracks (Billboard)	97

Chart (2000)	Position
US Mainstream Rock Tracks (Billboard)	32
US Modern Rock Tracks (Billboard)	92
US Triple-A (Billboard)	16

== Release history ==
Region	Date	Format(s)	Label	Ref.
United States	August 24, 1999	Active rock; alternative radio	Arista	
United States	May 23, 2000	Contemporary hit radio	Arista	
Sweden	October 30, 2000	CD	Arista	
United Kingdom	November 6, 2000	CD	Arista	
Germany	November 27, 2000	CD	Arista	
