= Eat at Whitey's =

Studio album by Everlast
- Released: October 17, 2000
- Recorded: 2000
- Studios: SD Studios (New York City); Fantasy Studios (Berkeley, California); NRG Recording Studios (North Hollywood); Ocean Way Recording (Hollywood)
- Genres: Hip-hop; folk rock
- Length: 46:07
- Label: Tommy Boy/Warner Bros.
- Producers: Everlast (also exec.); Dante Ross (also exec.); John Gamble; Fredwreck; Alchemist

Everlast chronology
Whitey Ford Sings the Blues (1998)	Eat at Whitey's (2000)	White Trash Beautiful (2004)

Singles from Eat at Whitey's
- 1. "Black Jesus" Released: 2000; 2. "I Can't Move" Released: 2000; 3. "Deadly Assassins" Released: 2001

Eat at Whitey's is the third solo studio album by American recording artist Everlast. It was released on October 17, 2000, via Tommy Boy Records. The album's audio production was primarily handled by Dante Ross and John Gamble. According to AllMusic, the album continues from the folk rock style of Everlast's previous album, Whitey Ford Sings the Blues. It featured guest appearances from various musicians, such as Carlos Santana, B-Real, Rahzel, N'Dea Davenport, Cee-Lo Green, Warren Haynes, and Kurupt.

The album was both a commercial and critical success and has been certified gold by the Recording Industry Association of America a month after its release. It peaked at number 20 on the U.S. Billboard 200 chart with sales of 50,000 copies. The lead single of the record, "Black Jesus", peaked at number 15 on the Billboard Alternative Songs and number 30 on the Billboard Mainstream Rock.

== Reception ==
Professional ratings
Aggregate scores
Source	Rating
Metacritic	67/100
Review scores
Source	Rating
AllMusic	4/5 stars
Alternative Press	3/5 stars
Encyclopedia of Popular Music	4/5 stars
Entertainment Weekly	B
The Independent	4/5 stars
Mojo	2.5/5 stars
NME	7/10
Q	2/5 stars
Spin	7/10
Wall of Sound	82/100

Eat at Whitey's received generally favorable reviews from critics. At Metacritic, which assigns a normalized rating out of 100 to reviews from mainstream publications, the album received an average score of 67, based on 16 reviews.

Building on Whitey Ford's organic folk-pop rap, Eat at Whitey's develops the songwriter's street-style troubadour fixation even further. This time, there's more singing than rapping, and his gruff vocals actually sound stylish, especially on the provocative "Black Jesus" and the memorable "Black Coffee".

— Bob Gulla, Wall of Sound

Stephen Thomas Erlewine of AllMusic stated: "Whenever Everlast lays back and spins stories and tall tales on his own, his blend of folk, rock, blues, rap, and pop culture clicks". In New York's Vulture.com, it said: "The rapper's nicotine-scarred voice does sound bluesy, and his raps are serious without being arch like Beck's. The album's sound -- a marriage of classical string arrangements and sparse drum beats -- makes the guitar stomp of his rap-rock peers seem more one-dimensional than ever. But Everlast's blues are one-shaded -- nothing on Eat at Whitey's approaches the grim fatalism of the Geto Boys' 'Mind Playing Tricks on Me', Eminem's 'Rock Bottom', or even Snoop Doggy Dogg's 'Murder Was the Case'."

== Track listing ==
No.	Title	Writer(s)	Producer(s)	Length
1.	"Whitey"	E. Schrody; D. Ross; J. Gamble	Dante Ross; Everlast; John Gamble	1:35
2.	"Black Jesus"	E. Schrody	Dante Ross; Everlast; John Gamble	4:40
3.	"I Can't Move"	E. Schrody; K. Ciancia	Dante Ross; Everlast; John Gamble	3:25
4.	"Black Coffee"	E. Schrody; K. Ciancia	Dante Ross; Everlast; John Gamble	2:56
5.	"Babylon Feeling" (featuring Carlos Santana)	E. Schrody	Dante Ross; Everlast; John Gamble	5:11
6.	"Deadly Assassins" (featuring B-Real)	E. Schrody; L. Freese; A. Maman	Alchemist	2:43
7.	"Children's Story" (featuring Rahzel)	R. Walters	Dante Ross; Everlast; John Gamble	3:20
8.	"Love for Real" (featuring N'Dea Davenport)	E. Schrody	Dante Ross; Everlast; John Gamble	4:21
9.	"One and the Same"	E. Schrody; K. Ciancia; M. Oliver	Dante Ross; Everlast; John Gamble	5:02
10.	"We're All Gonna Die" (featuring Cee-Lo Green)	E. Schrody; K. Ciancia	Dante Ross; Everlast; John Gamble	2:20
11.	"Mercy on My Soul" (featuring Warren Haynes)	E. Schrody; K. Ciancia	Dante Ross; Everlast; John Gamble	3:24
12.	"One, Two" (featuring Kurupt)	E. Schrody; R. Brown; F. Nassar	Fredwreck	3:27
13.	"Graves to Dig"	E. Schrody	Dante Ross; Everlast; John Gamble	3:23
Total length:				46:07

Notes

- "Children's Story" is a cover song of "Children's Story" by Slick Rick

== Personnel ==
Vocalists

- Erik Francis Schrody - vocals
- N'Dea Davenport - vocals (track 8), additional vocals (track 9)
- Louis Freese - vocals (track 6)
- Thomas Callaway - vocals (track 10)
- Ricardo Brown - vocals (track 12)
- Merry Clayton - additional vocals (tracks 2, 4, 11)
- Bob Khalil - additional vocals (track 2)
- Brendan Lynch - additional vocals (track 2)
- Chris Thomas - additional vocals (track 2)
- Kevin Dorsey - doowops (track 2)
- James Gilstrap - doowops (track 2)
- Dorian Holley - doowops (track 2)
- Phillip Ingram - doowops (track 2)
- Rahzel M. Brown - beatbox (track 7)

Instrumentalists

- Erik Francis Schrody - guitar
- Keith Ciancia - keyboards (also live), bass (track 2)
- Carlos Santana - guitar (track 5)
- Jack Daley - bass (tracks 5, 9, 11)
- Victor Rice - bass (track 4)
- Miles Tackett - cello (track 1)
- Ben Boccardo - bass (track 8)
- Chris Thomas - bass (track 10, also live)
- Farid II Schater - bass (track 12)
- Abdel Wahab - sitar (track 12)
- John Bigham - guitar (live)
- Larry Ciancia - drums (live)
- Patrick Freitas - deejay (live)

Technicals

- Erik Francis Schrody - producer (tracks 1–5, 7–11, 13), programming (tracks 11, 13), executive producer
- Dante Ross - producer (tracks 1–5, 7–11, 13), programming, mixing, executive producer
- John Gamble - producer (tracks 1–5, 7–11, 13), programming, mixing, recording
- Daniel Alan Maman - producer (track 6)
- Farid Nassar - producer (track 12)
- Howie Weinberg - mastering
- Jamie Staub - mixing
- David Campbell - strings arrangement
- Jay Nicholas - assistant engineer
- Jason Tuminello - assistant engineer
- John O'Mahony - assistant engineer
- Noah Evans - assistant engineer

Additional

- Andy VanDette - editor
- Christian Lantry - photography
- Carl Stubner - management
- Corey Wagner - management

== Charts ==
Chart (2000)	Peak position
Australian Albums (ARIA Charts)	67
Austrian Albums (Ö3 Austria)	25
Canadian Albums (Billboard)	20
Dutch Albums (Album Top 100)	52
Finnish Albums (Suomen virallinen lista)	30
German Albums (Offizielle Top 100)	11
Swedish Albums (Sverigetopplistan)	60
Swiss Albums (Schweizer Hitparade)	25
UK Albums (Official Charts)	89
US Billboard 200	20
US Independent Albums (Billboard)	2

== Certifications ==
Region	Certification	Certified units/sales
United States (RIAA)	Gold	500,000^{^}
^{^} Shipments figures based on certification alone.
