= List of Billboard Hot 100 number ones of 2000 =

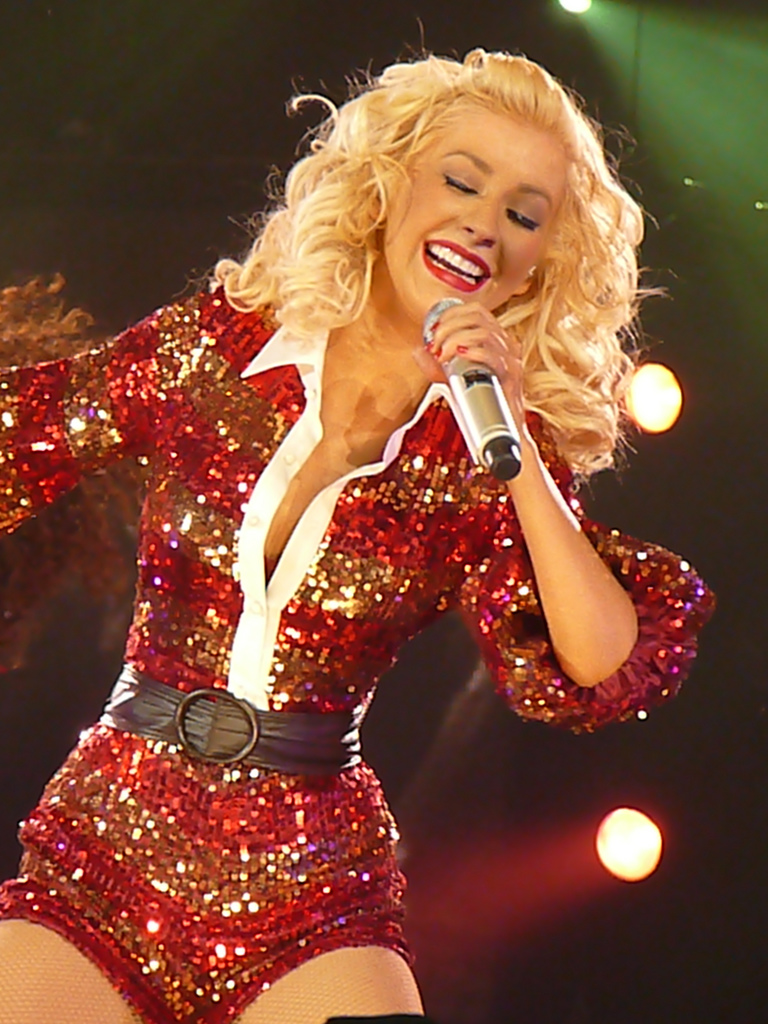
Pop singer Christina Aguilera gained her second and third number one singles "What a Girl Wants and "Come On Over Baby (All I Want Is You)" in the U.S. totalling six weeks.

The Billboard Hot 100 is a chart that ranks the best-performing singles of the United States. Published by Billboard magazine, the data are compiled by Nielsen SoundScan based collectively on each single's weekly physical sales, and airplay. There were 18 number-one singles in 2000. The first of these, Santana's "Smooth", spent two weeks at the top in January, concluding a 12-week run that had begun in October 1999.

During the year, 10 acts each achieved a first U.S. number-one single, either as a lead artist or featured guest: Joe, 98 Degrees, Lonestar, The Product G&B, Aaliyah, Vertical Horizon, Matchbox Twenty, NSYNC, Sisqó, and Creed. Destiny's Child and Christina Aguilera were the only acts to have earned two number-one singles in this year. There were two collaboration singles that reached number-one on the chart: "Maria Maria" by Santana featuring The Product G&B, and "Thank God I Found You" by Mariah Carey featuring Joe and 98 Degrees. With the latter single, Carey set the record for most consecutive years charting a number-one single on the Billboard Hot 100 with 11 years from 1990 (beginning with "Vision of Love") through 2000, and became her 15th number-one single on the chart.

Destiny's Child's "Independent Women" is the second-longest-running single of 2000, topping the chart for 7 consecutive weeks, with another four consecutive weeks in the 2001 chart year. Santana's "Maria Maria" is the longest-running single, staying at number one for 10 straight weeks. Other singles with extended chart run include pop singer Madonna's "Music" and Christina Aguilera's "Come On Over Baby (All I Want Is You)", each of which topped the chart for four weeks.

== Chart history ==
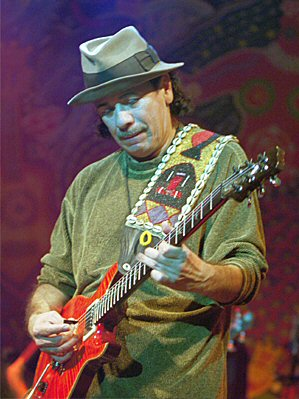
Santana and The Product G&B's "Maria Maria" was the longest-running single of 2000, topping the chart for 10 consecutive weeks.

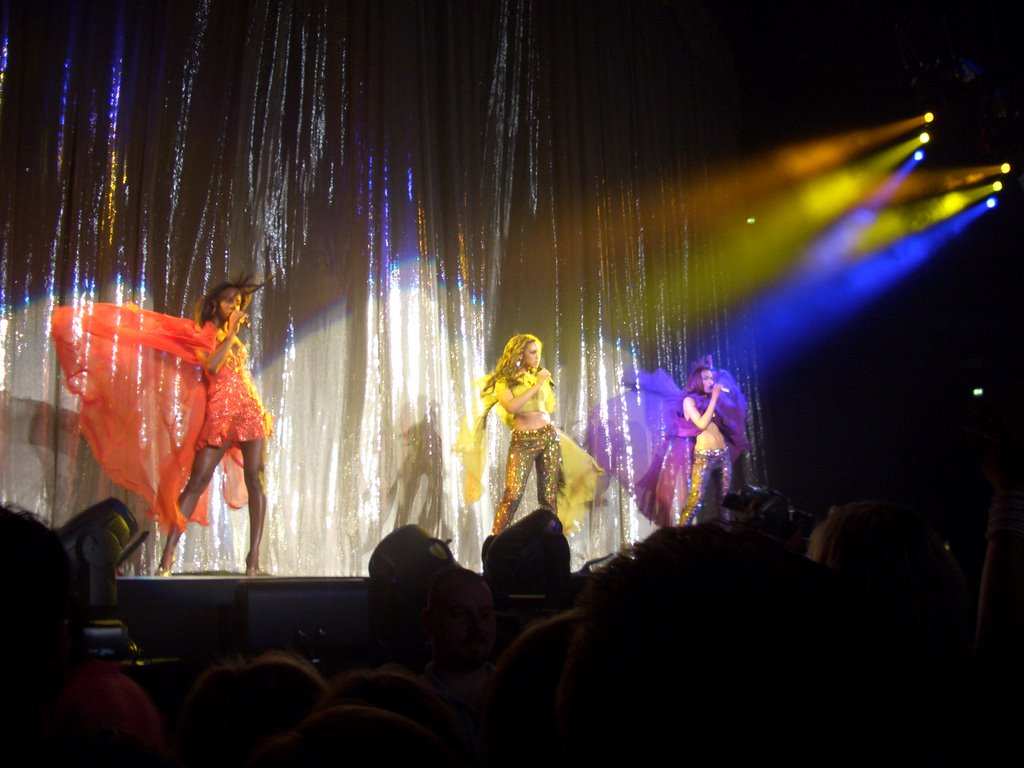
The girl group Destiny's Child gained their second and third number one singles "Say My Name" and their best charting single "Independent Women" which stayed at No.1 for eleven consecutive weeks.

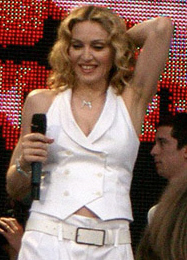
Singer Madonna gained her twelfth number one single "Music," which stayed at the top of the U.S. charts for four consecutive weeks.

Key
The #1 song of 2000, "Breathe" by Faith Hill, never reached #1 on the weekly charts.

No.	Issue date	Song	Artist(s)	Ref.
850	January 1	"Smooth"	Santana featuring Rob Thomas	
850	January 8	"Smooth"	Santana featuring Rob Thomas	
851	January 15	"What a Girl Wants"	Christina Aguilera	
851	January 22	"What a Girl Wants"	Christina Aguilera	
852	January 29	"I Knew I Loved You"	Savage Garden	
852	February 5	"I Knew I Loved You"	Savage Garden	
852	February 12	"I Knew I Loved You"	Savage Garden	
853	February 19	"Thank God I Found You"	Mariah Carey featuring Joe and 98 Degrees	
re	February 26	"I Knew I Loved You"	Savage Garden	
854	March 4	"Amazed"	Lonestar	
854	March 11	"Amazed"	Lonestar	
855	March 18	"Say My Name"	Destiny's Child	
855	March 25	"Say My Name"	Destiny's Child	
855	April 1	"Say My Name"	Destiny's Child	
856	April 8	"Maria Maria"	Santana featuring The Product G&B	
856	April 15	"Maria Maria"	Santana featuring The Product G&B	
856	April 22	"Maria Maria"	Santana featuring The Product G&B	
856	April 29	"Maria Maria"	Santana featuring The Product G&B	
856	May 6	"Maria Maria"	Santana featuring The Product G&B	
856	May 13	"Maria Maria"	Santana featuring The Product G&B	
856	May 20	"Maria Maria"	Santana featuring The Product G&B	
856	May 27	"Maria Maria"	Santana featuring The Product G&B	
856	June 3	"Maria Maria"	Santana featuring The Product G&B	
856	June 10	"Maria Maria"	Santana featuring The Product G&B	
857	June 17	"Try Again"	Aaliyah	
858	June 24	"Be with You"	Enrique Iglesias	
858	July 1	"Be with You"	Enrique Iglesias	
858	July 8	"Be with You"	Enrique Iglesias	
859	July 15	"Everything You Want"	Vertical Horizon	
860	July 22	"Bent"	Matchbox Twenty	
861	July 29	"It's Gonna Be Me"	NSYNC	
861	August 5	"It's Gonna Be Me"	NSYNC	
862	August 12	"Incomplete"	Sisqó	
862	August 19	"Incomplete"	Sisqó	
863	August 26	"Doesn't Really Matter"	Janet	
863	September 2	"Doesn't Really Matter"	Janet	
863	September 9	"Doesn't Really Matter"	Janet	
864	September 16	"Music"	Madonna	
864	September 23	"Music"	Madonna	
864	September 30	"Music"	Madonna	
864	October 7	"Music"	Madonna	
865	October 14	"Come On Over Baby (All I Want Is You)"	Christina Aguilera	
865	October 21	"Come On Over Baby (All I Want Is You)"	Christina Aguilera	
865	October 28	"Come On Over Baby (All I Want Is You)"	Christina Aguilera	
865	November 4	"Come On Over Baby (All I Want Is You)"	Christina Aguilera	
866	November 11	"With Arms Wide Open"	Creed	
867	November 18	"Independent Women"	Destiny's Child	
867	November 25	"Independent Women"	Destiny's Child	
867	December 2	"Independent Women"	Destiny's Child	
867	December 9	"Independent Women"	Destiny's Child	
867	December 16	"Independent Women"	Destiny's Child	
867	December 23	"Independent Women"	Destiny's Child	
867	December 30	"Independent Women"	Destiny's Child	

== Number-one artists ==
List of number-one artists by total weeks at number one
Position	Artist	Weeks at No. 1
1	Santana	12
2	Destiny's Child	10
2	The Product G&B	10
4	Christina Aguilera	6
5	Savage Garden	4
5	Madonna	4
7	Enrique Iglesias	3
7	Janet	3
9	Rob Thomas	2
9	Lonestar	2
9	NSYNC	2
9	Sisqó	2
13	Mariah Carey	1
13	Joe	1
13	98 Degrees	1
13	Aaliyah	1
13	Vertical Horizon	1
13	Matchbox Twenty	1
13	Creed	1

== See also ==
- 2000 in music
- List of Billboard number-one singles
- List of Billboard Hot 100 number-one singles of the 2000s

== Additional sources ==
- Fred Bronson's Billboard Book of Number 1 Hits, 5th Edition (ISBN 0-8230-7677-6)
- Joel Whitburn's Top Pop Singles 1955-2008, 12 Edition (ISBN 0-89820-180-2)
- Joel Whitburn Presents the Billboard Hot 100 Charts: The 2000s (ISBN 0-89820-182-9)
- Additional information obtained can be verified within Billboard's online archive services and print editions of the magazine.
