= Charles Goodan =

American singer-songwriter

Charles Goodan is an American, Los Angeles–based, Grammy Award winning musician, record producer, composer, singer, songwriter, engineer and multi-instrumentalist who has worked with many acclaimed artists such as Beck, The Rolling Stones, David Fincher, Morphine and Linkin Park. He is best known for his Grammy Award winning work on Santana's album Supernatural, as well composing the Brit-Award nominated score for the film Fight Club and engineering the #1 Billboard song "MMMBop" by Hanson.

== Education ==
Charles was classically trained in music from the age of four. He earned honors at the Royal Academy of Music in London before majoring in Music, Science & Technology at Stanford University. While there, Charles was also selected to be the school's unofficial mascot, the Stanford Tree.

== Career ==
He moved to Los Angeles in 1996 to become a staff producer for famed producers The Dust Brothers. He started his own production company Devil's Food and has gone on to produce and engineer for many other artists and continues to write and compose music for films, television and advertisements through his production company.
