= Love of My Life (Santana song) =

Promotional single by Santana featuring Dave Matthews and Carter Beauford

from the album Supernatural
- Released: August 7, 2000
- Length: 5:48
- Label: Arista
- Songwriters: Carlos Santana; Dave Matthews
- Producers: Carlos Santana; Stephen Harris

Santana chronology
"Maria Maria" (1999)	"Love of My Life" (2000)	"Corazon Espinado" (2000)

"Love of My Life" is a song by the American rock band Santana featuring Dave Matthews and Carter Beauford of the Dave Matthews Band, sent to adult contemporary radio as a promotional single from Santana's eighteenth studio album Supernatural (1999).

== Background and composition ==
According to Carlos Santana, "Love of My Life" was a reworking of the third movement of Brahms’ Symphony No.3 in F major, which he reportedly called a "glorious piece of music".

== Release and reception ==
"Love of My Life" was released to adult contemporary radio on August 7, 2000. and later to contemporary hit radio and pop on September 12. in a Billboard review, Chuck Taylor notes that "The midtempo track features a minimalist vocal line from Matthews and DMB's Beauford on drums. Matthews trades vocal lines with Santana's guitar, using a melody inspired by Brahms' Symphony No. 3 in F major", adding that "The tune's coda shifts gears into a Latin/jazz/rock groove for a fade -out more typical of classic Santana", concluding in his review by mentioning that "The single benefits from a strong, radio-friendly team-up and should work on a number of levels, from top 40 to AC. Seems that Santana can do no wrong these days. Expect swift action." In a 20 year retrospective article for Stereogum, Phil Freeman states: ""Love Of My Life," with Dave Matthews and Carter Beauford of the Dave Matthews Band, is a ballad inexplicably built on one of those excessively complex and yet still somehow energy-less “funk” rhythms that people like… well, like Carter Beauford made hippies twirl in circles to in the 1990s. In the track's second half, the congas and timbales show up and things get a little more active, but the jam band vibe keeps things baggily earthbound." In a review for Supernatural for Rolling Stone, David Wild called it a "lilting, romantic little gem that finds Matthews sounding extremely Peter Gabriel-like and Santana answering back, playing with seasoned taste and passion." Stephen Thomas Erlewine wrote in a Dave Matthews Band FAQ book that the song "features the dexterous drumming of Carter Beauford[, ]a move that underscores the jazz-fusion sensibility that flows through both Santana and DMB", adding that ""Love of My Life" swings harder than most Dave Matthews Band songs, and it also has latin-flavored breakdowns, so it winds up existing at the cross-section of the two bands: it has the rhythms of Santana and the pop sensibility of Dave Matthews Band."

== Release history ==
Region	Date	Format(s)	Label(s)	Ref(s).
United States	August 7, 2000	Adult contemporary radio	Arista	
United States	September 12, 2000	Contemporary hit radio	Arista	

== Charts ==
Chart (2000)	Peak position
US Adult Alternative Airplay (Billboard)	27
US Adult Pop Airplay (Billboard)	39
