= Itaal Shur =

American composer, producer and musician

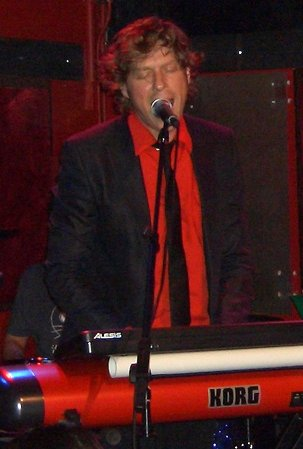
- Shur, December 2009

Background information
- Born: Los Angeles, California, U.S.
- Genres: Acid jazz, avant-garde jazz, funk, techno, hip hop
- Occupations: Composer, record producer, musician
- Instruments: Keyboards, vocals
- Years active: Early 1990s–present
- Website: itaalshur.com

Itaal Shur (born October 22, 1966) is an American composer, producer and musician. He has written songs for a number of musicians, including Maxwell, Jewel and Enrique Iglesias, and has produced records for various artists, including Kronos Quartet, The Scumfrog and Lucy Woodward. He was the founding member of the acid jazz group Groove Collective, and has released three solo albums.

One of Shur's most notable works is the song "Smooth", which he co-wrote with Matchbox 20's Rob Thomas for Santana's Grammy Award winning album Supernatural. "Smooth" reached number one on the Billboard Hot 100 in 1999, and won Shur and Thomas the 1999 Grammy Award for Song of the Year.

== Early life and education ==
Shur was born in Los Angeles, California on October 22, 1966 but was raised in Seattle, Washington and Cincinnati, Ohio. His parents are the late Bonia Shur, who was a composer of Israeli and Jewish music and director of Liturgic Arts at the Hebrew Union College in Cincinnati who had emigrated to the United States from Russia via Israel, and Fanchon Wechsler Shur, born in Chicago, Illinois, a former dancer and choreographer. Shur attended middle school at The School for Creative and Performing Arts (SCPA) in Cincinnati. He graduated from Walnut Hills High School in Cincinnati, and studied jazz and composition for a year at the College Conservatory of Music in Cincinnati. In the early 1990s he joined a local art rock band called Sleep Theatre with Rob Hamrick and Chris Sherman (later known as Freekbass).

== Career ==
Shur moved to New York City in 1992 where, in between doing odd jobs, he played in a Moroccan band and performed at the Knitting Factory, an avant-garde jazz venue. Then he switched to acid jazz and co-founded the acid jazz group Groove Collective, featuring on their first two albums. Shur also began composing songs, and his first hit was "Ascension (Don't Ever Wonder)", which he co-wrote with Maxwell for Maxwell's 1996 debut album, Maxwell's Urban Hang Suite.

In the late 1990s, Shur explored funk, techno and hip-hop, and released two solo albums under an alias Big Muff, which he took from the name of an old Electro-Harmonix guitar distortion pedal, Big Muff. "My Funny Valentine" from his first album, Music From the Aural Exciter was a minor hit in the United Kingdom in 1998. The song that launched Shur's career was "Smooth", which he co-wrote with Matchbox 20's Rob Thomas for Santana's album Supernatural. When he heard that Santana needed a song for their new album, Shur composed a song over a weekend. Thomas, who sang the lead vocals with Santana, rewrote Shur's melody and lyrics for the retitled song, "Smooth". Carlos Santana's "samba-like guitar riff" on "Smooth" was "note-for-note" as Shur had written it. "Smooth" reached number one on the Billboard Hot 100 in 1999, and won Shur and Thomas the 1999 Grammy Award for Song of the Year. Supernatural also won a Grammy Award in 1999 for Album of the Year.

Shur released another solo album, Milk & Honey – 10 Hits To Bliss in 2001, this time under his real name. He also produced a number of albums for various artists, including Kronos Quartet, Hinda Hicks, Mark Farina, Lighthouse Family, The Scumfrog and Lucy Woodward. Shur has since established his own artist development and production company.

== Solo discography ==
- Music From the Aural Exciter (1998, Snapt Records) – released under the alias Big Muff
- Aurally Exciting Remixes (2000, Razor & Tie) – released under the alias Big Muff
- Milk & Honey – 10 Hits to Bliss (2001, Wave Music)
