= Siba Giba =

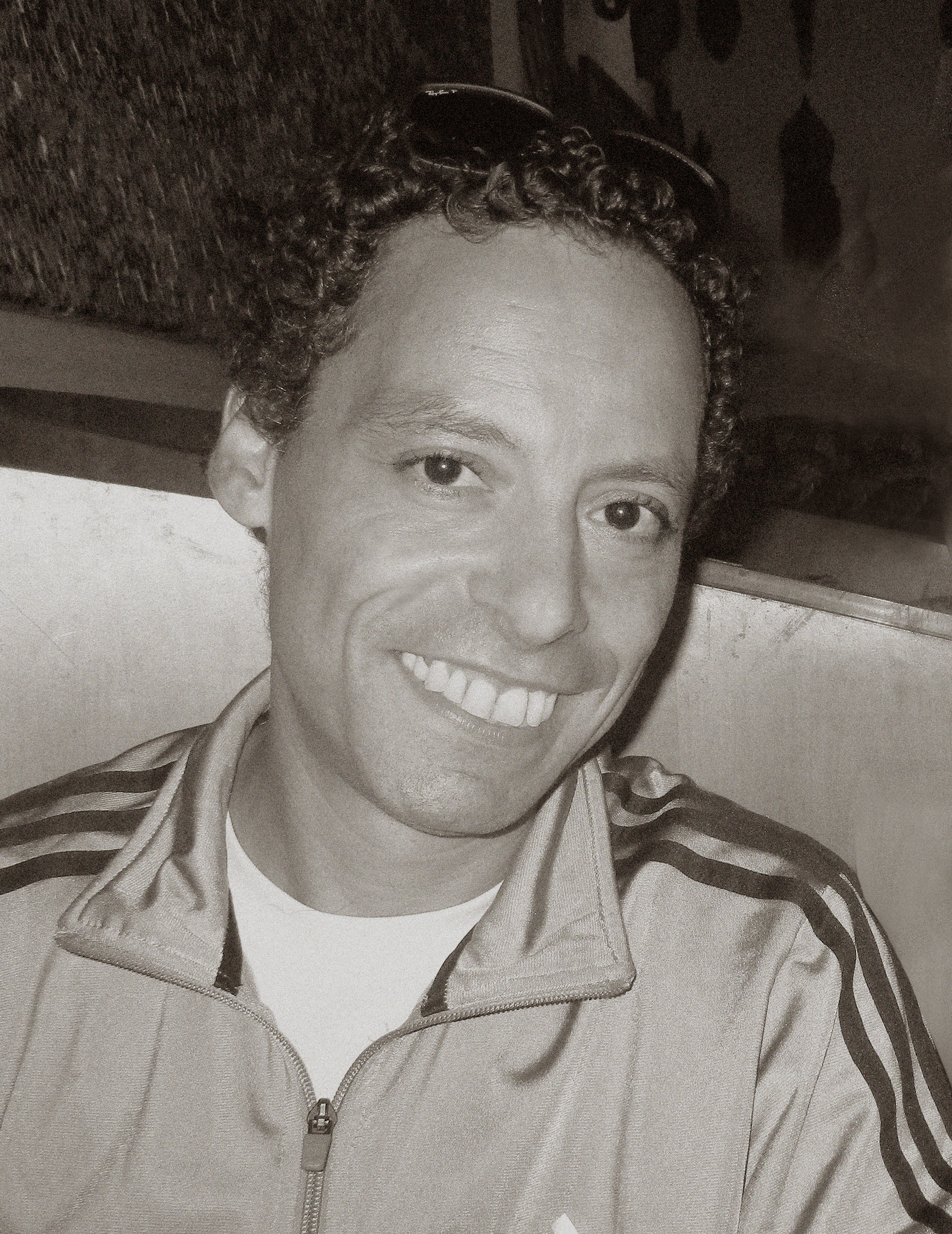
- Siba Giba in L.A. (2018)

Background information
- Also known as: Siba-Giba, SBG, Sebastian Bardin-Greenberg
- Born: Paris, France
- Occupations: Record producer, rapper, composer
- Instrument: Drums

Siba Giba (or SBG) is a French-American record producer, rapper, composer, curator, journalist and hip hop historian who lives in Brooklyn. He is a member of the hip hop group Get Open. He is the founder of Overtime Records and is also the co-founder and artistic director of the Hip Hop Loves Foundation.

As a producer, he has worked with Daddy-O (Stetsasonic), Sadat X (Brand Nubian), Vinia Mojica and Freestyle Fellowship. In 1999, he produced and co-wrote the song "Painkillers" by Everlast for the album Whitey Ford Sings the Blues. The record was certified triple platinum, selling more than 3,000,000 copies, and was nominated for two Grammy Awards.

In 2017/2018 Giba curated an exhibition entitled, "Hip-Hop : Un Age d'Or", a hip hop culture collective that featured photographs and artifacts from the period known as Golden age hip hop (mid/late 1980s until the mid-1990s). The show ran at the Musée d'Art Contemporain (Museum Of Contemporary Art) in Marseille, France, from May 13, 2017, until January 14, 2018.
