= Whitey Ford Sings the Blues =

Studio album by Everlast
- Released: September 8, 1998
- Recorded: 1997–1998
- Studios: Erik's Crib; SD West; Enterprise Recording Studios; SD50 Inc; Paramount Recording Studios
- Genres: Blues, rock, hip-hop, folk rock
- Length: 55:07
- Label: Tommy Boy
- Producers: Carl Stubner (exec.); Everlast (also exec.); Dante Ross (also exec.); John Gamble; Divine Styler; Siba-Giba; E-Swift

Everlast chronology
Forever Everlasting (1990)	Whitey Ford Sings the Blues (1998)	Eat at Whitey's (2000)

Singles from Everlast
- 1. "What It's Like" Released: July 1998; 2. "Ends" Released: March 15, 1999

Professional ratings
Review scores
Source	Rating
AllMusic	4.5/5 stars
Encyclopedia of Popular Music	4/5 stars
Robert Christgau	(2-star Honorable Mention)

Whitey Ford Sings the Blues is the second solo studio album by American recording artist Everlast, and the first one following his departure from House of Pain. It was released on September 8, 1998, via Tommy Boy Records, a full eight years after his solo debut album Forever Everlasting and after he had a major heart attack. "Whitey Ford" in the album title refers to the New York Yankees pitcher of the same name.

The album was both a commercial and critical success (selling more than three million copies) and went 2× platinum according to RIAA. It peaked at No. 9 on the Billboard 200. Its hit single "What It's Like" became Everlast's most popular and successful song, which garnered him a Grammy Award nomination for Best Male Rock Vocal Performance at the 42nd Annual Grammy Awards.

Whitey Ford Sings the Blues blended rap with acoustic and electric guitars, developed by Everlast together with producers Dante Ross and John Gamble. The album incorporates a mix of musical styles such as blues, rock, and hip-hop. The South Florida Sun-Sentinel wrote that the album "exudes the folk-rock vibe – if not quite the peerless songwriting – of a Bruce Springsteen or a Steve Earle, augmented by the beats that Everlast perfected in his former band."

== Singles ==
Whitey Ford Sings the Blues spawned five singles: "What It's Like", "Painkillers", "Money (Dollar Bill)", "Ends", and "Today (Watch Me Shine)". Its lead single "What It's Like" peaked at No. 1 on the Billboard Hot Mainstream Rock Tracks and Hot Modern Rock Tracks. "Ends" peaked at No. 7 on the Billboard Alternative Songs, "Today (Watch Me Shine)" peaked at No. 12 on the Ö3 Austria Top 40, and the other two did not appear in main music charts. "Painkillers" appeared in the 1996 Jet Li film Black Mask.

== Track listing ==
No.	Title	Writer(s)	Producer(s)	Length
1.	"The White Boy Is Back" (Skit) (featuring Kia Jeffries)	Kurtis Walker; Mark Morales; Damon Wimbley; Darren Robinson	Dante Ross; John Gamble	0:45
2.	"Money (Dollar Bill)" (featuring Sadat X)	Erik Schrody; Ross; Russell Simmons; Jimmy Spicer; David Reeves; Larry Smith; Pete Wingfield; Joe Jammer; DeLisle Harper; Glen Lefleur; Mike Vernon	Ross; Gamble	3:14
3.	"Ends"	Schrody; Ross; Clifford Smith; Corey Woods; Dennis Coles; Gary Grice; Jason Hunter; Lamont Hawkins; Robert Diggs Jr.; Russel Jones; Isaac Hayes; David Porter	Ross; Gamble	4:33
4.	"What It's Like"	Schrody	Ross; Gamble	5:03
5.	"Get Down"	Schrody	Ross; Gamble	3:59
6.	"Sen Dog" (Skit)	Senen Reyes	Ross; Gamble	0:15
7.	"Tired"	Schrody; Ross; John Gamble	Ross; Gamble	2:22
8.	"Hot to Death"	Schrody; Mark Richardson	Divine Styler	3:49
9.	"Painkillers"	Schrody	Siba Giba	3:23
10.	"Prince Paul" (Skit)	Paul Huston	Ross; Gamble	0:59
11.	"Praise the Lord"	Schrody; Eric Brooks; Keith Elam; Chris Martin; Greg Mays; Darryl Barnes	E-Swift	3:05
12.	"Today (Watch Me Shine)" (featuring Bronx Style Bob)	Schrody	Ross; Gamble	5:02
13.	"Guru" (Skit)	Elam	Ross; Gamble	0:17
14.	"Death Comes Callin'"	Bill Curtis; Richard Cornwell; Schrody; Ross	Ross; Gamble	4:16
15.	"Funky Beat" (featuring Casual & Sadat X)	Schrody; John Owens; Derrick Murphy; Ross; Sekou Bunch; Al Diaz; Malik Johnson; Stephan Piccarell	Ross; Gamble	4:03
16.	"The Letter"	Schrody; Ross	Ross; Gamble	2:06
17.	"7 Years"	Schrody; Ross	Ross; Gamble	4:04
18.	"Next Man"	Schrody; Ross	Ross; Gamble	3:52
Total length:				55:07

Notes

- "The White Boy Is Back" is a cover song of "The Fat Boys Are Back" by Fat Boys, performed by Kia Jeffries
- "Ends" features background vocals by Bronx Style Bob
- "Next Man" is unlisted on the cassette release

== Personnel ==
Vocalists

- Eric Francis Schrody – vocals (tracks 2–5, 7–9, 11–12, 14–18)
- Derek Murphy – vocals (track 2, 15)
- Bob Khaleel – vocals (track 12), backing vocals (track 3)
- Jon Owens – vocals (track 15)
- Kia Jeffries – vocals (track 1)
- Senen Reyes – voice (track 6)
- Paul Edward Huston – voice (track 10)
- Keith Edward Elam – voice (track 13)

Instrumentalists

- Eric Francis Schrody – guitar (track 3–4, 14, 17), scratches (track 5, 12), keyboards (track 14)
- Dante Ross – drum programming & scratches (track 15); piano, bass & strings (track 10, 16)
- Keith "Keefus" Ciancia – keyboards (track 1, 5, 17)
- Nightrain Merlot – bass (track 3, 8, 12)
- Giovanni Loria – string arrangement (track 4), bass (track 5, 17)
- Elizabeth Wright – cello (track 4)
- Stephan Cullo – keyboards (track 4)
- John Wang – viola (track 4)
- Alen C. Agadhzhanyan – first violin (track 4)
- Jacqueline Suzuki – second violin (track 4)
- John Norwood Fisher – bass (track 4, 14)
- Melvin Babu – scratches (track 14)
- John Gamble – bass (track 15)
- Geoff Gallegos – tenor saxophone (track 17)
- Dan Osterman – trombone (track 17)
- Todd M. Simon – trumpet (track 17)

Technicals

- John Gamble – producer (tracks 1–7, 10, 12–18), mixing (track 3–5, 7, 9, 12, 14–18), engineer (tracks 1–5, 7–8, 11–12, 14–18)
- Dante Ross – producer (tracks 1–7, 10, 12–18), mixing (track 3–5, 7, 12, 14–17), executive producer
- Jamie Staub – mixing (tracks 3–5, 8, 11–12, 14–15, 17)
- Mark Richardson – producer & mixing (track 8)
- Eric Brooks – producer & mixing (track 11)
- Siba Giba – producer (track 9)
- Eric Francis Schrody – executive producer
- Carl Stubner – executive producer

Additional

- Dante Ross – A&R direction
- Max Nichols – A&R direction
- Jason Rand – art direction, design
- Keith Carter – photography

== Charts ==
=== Weekly charts ===
Chart (1998–2000)	Peak position
Australian Albums (ARIA)	29
Austrian Albums (Ö3 Austria)	14
Canadian Albums (Billboard)	8
Dutch Albums (Album Top 100)	66
German Albums (Offizielle Top 100)	12
New Zealand Albums (RMNZ)	28
Swiss Albums (Schweizer Hitparade)	20
UK Albums (Official Charts)	19
US Billboard 200	9
US Independent Albums (Billboard)	14
US Heatseekers Albums (Billboard)	1

=== Year-end charts ===
Chart (1999)	Position
Austrian Albums (Ö3 Austria)	38
German Albums (Offizielle Top 100)	40
US Billboard 200	24

== Certifications ==
Region	Certification	Certified units/sales
United States (RIAA)	2× Platinum	2,000,000^{^}
^{^} Shipments figures based on certification alone.
