= Super 8 (band) =

- Origin: Los Angeles, California, U.S.
- Genres: Alternative rock, funk metal
- Years active: 1993–1997
- Label: Hollywood Records

Super 8 was an American rock band from Los Angeles, California. They were active from 1993 to 1997, releasing their sole full-length album through Hollywood Records.

== History ==
The band started in Los Angeles during 1993 with singer Bob Khaleel, a former hip hop artist from the Bronx. Khaleel had been working in the Los Angeles punk-funk scene since 1990, and Super 8's formation was encouraged by his friends in the Red Hot Chili Peppers. He hooked up with John O'Brien (guitars), and the two began writing, later rounding out the band with Heming Borthne (bass), Joel Shearer (guitars) and John Steward (drums) In 1995, they signed to Disney's Hollywood Records. A Super 8 cover of the song "Well, Well, Well" was included on the 1995 Hollywood Records compilation Working Class Hero: A Tribute to John Lennon. Khaleel listed the Beatles as being one of his biggest influences.

The band recorded their self-titled debut at Seattle's London Bridge Studios, with Rick Parashar of Pearl Jam fame. Just prior to recording, guitarist Joel Shearer were invited to play on the Alanis Morissette album Jagged Little Pill. Jagged Little Pill started gaining immense popularity by the time Super 8 had begun making their album in Seattle. Super 8 was released in May 1996, and spawned the radio single "King of the World". To support the album, Super 8 toured with AC/DC and Deftones, an act Khaleel had helped discover through his manager Guy Oseary.

From April 1997 to June 1997, the band opened for former Red Hot Chili Peppers guitarist John Frusciante on the Nuttstalk tour. They ceased being active not long afterwards.

Khaleel went on to record a solo album for Hollywood Records in 1998, while Joel Shearer became a well-known session musician, following his success with Jagged Little Pill.

== Musical style ==
According to AllMusic, the band's debut "falls somewhere between the soul-minded retro-rock of Lenny Kravitz and the Seattle grunge of Pearl Jam and Stone Temple Pilots." They also note "Though some of the songs are fairly psychedelia-influenced (especially "Railroad" and "Going Nowhere"), no one will mistake this CD for a late-'60s or early-'70s recording—Rick Parashar's production techniques are very '90s, and John O'Brien's guitar playing has '90s alternative rock written all over it."

== Members ==
- Bob Khaleel – vocals (1993–1997)
- Joel Shearer – guitar (1993–1997)
- John O'Brien – guitar (1993–1997)
- Heming Borthne – bass (1993–1997)
- John Steward – drums (1993–1997)

== Discography ==
=== Super 8 ===
Date	Region	Format	Label
May 7, 1996	North America	CD	Hollywood
March 1997	Europe	CD with bonus track	Hollywood
March 2020	Worldwide	Digital	Hollywood

=== Singles ===
- "King of the World" (1995)
- "Natural" (1996)

=== Music videos ===
- "King of the World" (1996)

=== Appearances ===
- "Well, Well, Well" (Working Class Hero: A Tribute to John Lennon, 1995)
- "Early Walk" (Schooloaf (Everything But The Crust), 1997)
- "Pain" (Nightwatch, 1997)
- "King of the World" (Daria Season 2 Episode 11, 1998)
