= Grammy Award for Best Pop Instrumental Performance by an Arranger, Composer, Orchestra and/or Choral Leader =

Music award category

The Grammy Award for Best Pop Instrumental Performance by an Arranger, Composer, Orchestra and/or Choral Leader was awarded at the 15th Annual Grammy Awards for music released in the previous year. 1973 was the only year in which the Grammy Award for Best Pop Instrumental Performance was split into Best Pop Instrumental Performance by an Arranger, Composer, Orchestra and/or Choral Leader and Best Pop Instrumental Performance - Instrumental Performer.

== Recipients ==
Year	Artist	Work	Nominess	Ref.
1973	Isaac Hayes	Black Moses	Santana - Caravanserai; Cy Coleman - "Theme from the Garden of the Finzi Continis"; Emerson, Lake & Palmer - Pictures at an Exhibition; Henry Mancini ve Doc Severinsen - Brass on Ivory; Quincy Jones - "Money Runner"	

== See also ==
- List of Grammy Award categories
- Grammy Award for Best Pop Instrumental Performance
