= Maria Maria =

1999 single by Santana

Single by Santana featuring the Product G&B

from the album Supernatural
- B-side: "Migra"
- Released: September 14, 1999
- Genre: Hip hop
- Length: 4:23
- Label: Arista
- Songwriters: Wyclef Jean; Jerry "Wonda" Duplessis; Carlos Santana; Karl Perazzo; Raul Rekow
- Producers: Wyclef Jean; Jerry "Wonda" Duplessis

Santana singles chronology
"Put Your Lights On" (1999)	"Maria Maria" (1999)	"Love of My Life" (2000)

The Product G&B singles chronology
"Here We Go" (1998)	"Maria Maria" (1999)	"Cluck, Cluck" (2001)

Music video
- "Maria Maria" on YouTube

"Maria Maria" is a song by American rock band Santana featuring the Product G&B, included on Santana's 18th studio album, Supernatural (1999). The song was written by Wyclef Jean, Jerry "Wonda" Duplessis, Carlos Santana, Karl Perazzo, and Raul Rekow, while Jean and Duplessis produced it. The track samples the drum beat from "God Make Me Funky" by American jazz fusion band the Headhunters, and the melody riff was inspired by the Wu-Tang Clan song "Wu-Tang Clan Ain't Nuthing ta Fuck Wit". Interspersed with guitars and other strings, "Maria Maria" is driven by a hip hop beat. At the 2000 Grammy Awards, the song won Best Pop Performance by a Duo or Group with Vocals before it experienced commercial success.

"Maria Maria" was released on September 14, 1999, to American urban radio and was issued physically worldwide throughout the following year. It reached number one in Canada, France, Germany, Hungary, Sweden, Switzerland, and the United States. In the US, it stayed at the top of the Billboard Hot 100 chart for 10 weeks and reached number one on two other Billboard listings. In 2018, in honor of the 60th anniversary of the Hot 100, Billboard compiled its list of the top songs since the ranking's inception, on which "Maria Maria" appeared at number 122. The song's success has inspired numerous sampling usages, plus a restaurant chain named after the track.

== Background ==
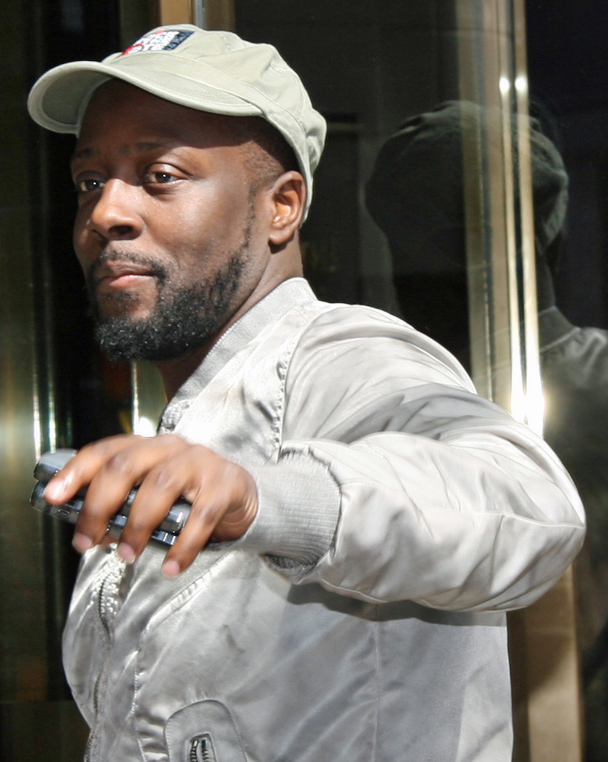
Wyclef Jean (pictured in 2008) co-wrote and co-produced "Maria Maria". He also performs several ad-libbed vocals, which he came up with while freestyling.

"Maria Maria" was written by Wyclef Jean, Jerry "Wonda" Duplessis, Carlos Santana, Karl Perazzo, and Raul Rekow. Jean and Duplessis conceived the song with Carlos Santana while Jean's previous musical group, Fugees, was on tour in San Francisco. During a Drink Champs podcast interview, Jean said that he came up with the song's composition by reworking a 1993 Wu-Tang Clan song titled "Wu-Tang Clan Ain't Nuthing ta Fuck Wit", borrowing the instrumental that plays during the title lyrics. The track also samples the drum beat from the Headhunters' song "God Make Me Funky" from their 1975 debut album, Survival of the Fittest. Jean asked the Product G&B, a musical duo composed of Marvin Moore and David McRae, to sing on the track after the two had telephoned a nearby music studio in New York to speak to a friend. Rapper and Fugees member Pras Michel answered the call, at which point Moore and McRae immediately decided to meet him at the studio. Jean soon added the duo to his record label, Yclef.

== Composition ==
"Maria Maria"
A 25-second sample of the chorus of "Maria Maria", illustrating its Latin-inspired hip hop beat and Carlos Santana's central guitar riff.

Jean and Duplessis produced "Maria Maria" while the Product G&B provided the lead vocals. Musically, "Maria Maria" is a hip hop song with Latin influences, punctuated by Spanish guitars and Carlos Santana's electric guitar. Tom Breihan of online publication Stereogum called the recording a "rap song [...] with no actual rapping".

The song describes a woman named Maria who observes the tumultuous circumstances of the world around her and wishes for a more pleasurable existence. Santana himself sings additional vocals, performing the "Ahora vengo mama chula" chants, as does Jean, who created his intermittent lyrics by freestyling. Duplessis plays the bass guitar while he and Jean collaborated on the drum programming. Additional instrumentalists who contributed to the recording include Jeremy Cohen on violin, Daniel Seidenberg and Hari Balakrishnan on viola, and Joseph Hébert on cello. The track was mixed, engineered, and mastered at three studios in New York City and at Fantasy Studios in Berkeley, California.

== Release and promotion ==
A screenshot of the music video for "Maria Maria", showing people partying to the track. The woman pictured arrives later and joins in on the festivities.

"Maria Maria" first appeared as the seventh track on Supernatural, which was released in the United States on June 15, 1999. Three months later, Arista Records serviced the song to US rhythmic contemporary and urban radio on September 14, 1999, three weeks after the previous single, "Put Your Lights On", was sent to rock-oriented radio. Contemporary hit radio officially added "Maria Maria" to its playlists on November 23, 1999. On January 25, 2000, the song was issued in the US as a CD single, a maxi-CD single, a cassette single, and a 7-inch vinyl single. The CD and cassette contain a remix of "Maria Maria" by Jean plus "Migra", the eighth track on Supernatural. The maxi-CD includes additional remixes while the 7-inch single has the album's lead single, "Smooth", as its B-side.

In Europe, a two-track CD single and a maxi-CD were distributed, with the latter format issued on February 7, 2000. Both formats contain various mixes and instrumentals of "Maria Maria". The maxi-CD was also issued in Australia. In the United Kingdom, the single was due to be released in late June 2000 to coincide with Santana's tour there, but it was delayed several times. It was eventually issued on July 24 as a CD and cassette containing the radio mix of the track plus Jean's remix and the Pumpin' Dolls remix. To promote the song, an accompanying music video was made, directed by Marcus Raboy and filmed from November 19–20, 1999, in Los Angeles. It features Santana, Jean, and the Product G&B performing the song in front of a large group of people, during which a woman arrives and begin dancing with them. In January 2000, MTV and BET added the video to their playlists.

== Critical reception ==
"Maria Maria" received generally positive reviews from music critics. On October 23, 1999, Billboard reviewed the song, preferring the original version over the Wyclef remix and writing that it "sounds cooler than an autumn breeze on the airwaves", noting that its simplistic nature does not detract from the quality and pointing out that its classic yet modern sound works well. British columnist James Masterton referred to the track as a "perfect summertime soundtrack" and called Jean's contributions to the track "unmistakable". In February 2000, before the song became a commercial success, it won a Grammy Award for Best Pop Performance by a Duo or Group with Vocals, one of the eight awards Santana accrued for that night. British trade paper Music Week listed the track as a "recommended" single in July 2000, calling Jean's contribution "a touch of magic". Retrospectively, in August 2022, Breihan reviewed the single for his "The Number Ones" column, giving the track a grade of 6 out of 10. He wrote that the song's beat and chants are the most engrossing parts of the composition, but the track does not live up to expectations, concluding, "It ultimately sounds like little more than a brand extension for all the parties involved, and that's really what it was."

== Commercial performance ==
On the Billboard Hot 100, "Maria Maria" debuted at number 15 on the chart dated February 12, 2000, becoming that week's highest debut with 55,000 sales. The following week, the song jumped to number eight, giving Santana two simultaneous top-10 hits, along with "Smooth", which was at number five. After rising above "Smooth" on February 26, the song took five more issues to reach number one, garnering 102,500 weekly sales on April 8. It topped the chart for 10 weeks, dropping to number eight on June 17, and stayed on the Hot 100 for 26 weeks in total. On other Billboard rankings, the song reached number one on the Maxi-Singles Sales chart for four weeks and on the Hot R&B/Hip-Hop Singles & Tracks chart for three weeks. It also peaked at number two on the Mainstream Top 40, number seven on the Rhythmic Top 40, and number 12 on the Adult Top 40. At the end of 2000, Billboard ranked the song at three on its year-end edition, and in 2009, the same publication placed the track at number 14 on its decade-end ranking. In 2018, the Hot 100 published an all-time chart for its 60th anniversary, on which "Maria Maria" appeared at number 122. The Recording Industry Association of America (RIAA) awarded the song a platinum disc in March 2000, denoting shipments of one million units.

In Canada, "Maria Maria" peaked atop the RPM 100 Hit Tracks chart on April 17, 2000, and also appeared on the Adult Contemporary Tracks and Top 30 Dance rankings. In Europe, "Maria Maria" was the second-best-selling single of 2000, topping the Eurochart Hot 100. The song stayed at number one in Switzerland for five weeks, earned a platinum certification from the International Federation of the Phonographic Industry (IFPI), and came in at number two on the country's year-end chart for 2000. In Sweden, the single reached number one for two weeks, while in both France and Germany, it remained atop the charts for four weeks. It also reached number one in Hungary in March 2000. Elsewhere in continental Europe, the song entered the top 10 in nine other nations, including Austria, Denmark, Iceland, the Netherlands, and Belgium's Wallonia region, where it entered the top three. In the Czech Republic and Spain, the single achieved top-20 placings. In July 2000, the song debuted and peaked at number six on the UK Singles Chart and at number 21 on the Irish Singles Chart. The song also charted in Australia and New Zealand, topping off at number 49 in both countries and spending two non-consecutive weeks within the top 50 on both national charts.

== Legacy ==
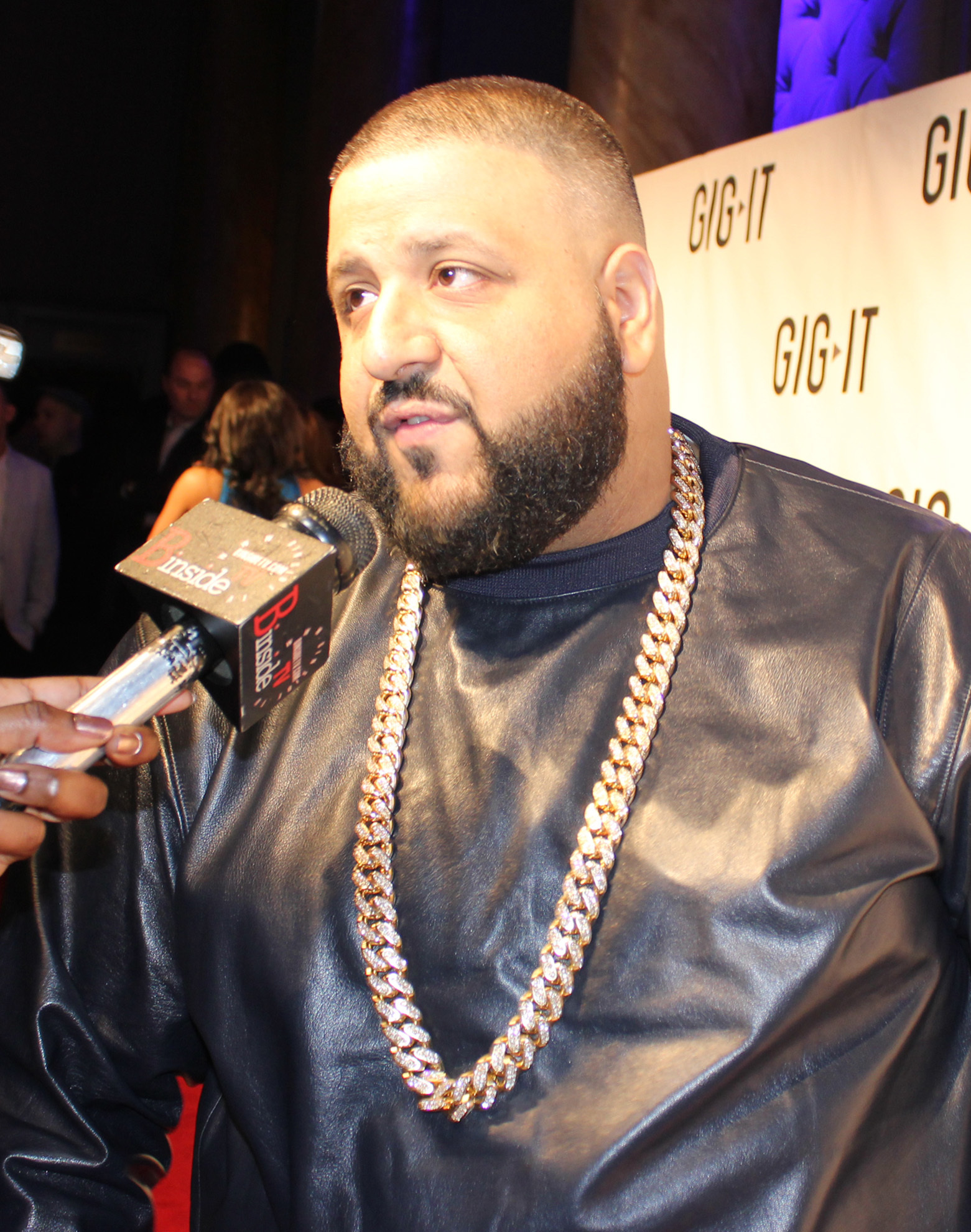
DJ Khaled (pictured in 2012) sampled "Maria Maria" on his worldwide hit "Wild Thoughts".

Carlos Santana worked with chef Roberto Santibañez and California business Dudum Sports and Entertainment (DSE) to open a restaurant chain named after the song in 2007. The menu, created by Santibañez with assistance from Santana, contains traditional Mexican food with modern alterations, including duck tacos, zucchini-filled poblanos, chipotle sauce, and salmon filet. Only four of these restaurants are still operational, with two in Northern California, one in Arizona, and one in Texas. Five painters and visual artists were recruited to design the restaurants' decor, which was inspired by Santana's music.

In 2017, "Maria Maria" was sampled by DJ Khaled on his song "Wild Thoughts", which features Rihanna and Bryson Tiller. The single reached the top 10 in many countries, peaking at number one on the UK Singles Chart and number two on the US Billboard Hot 100. Santana, who co-signed the track, said that it brings the original guitar riff "to a new dimension" without sacrificing his song's summery essence, which he called "timeless". In 2023, Dutch DJ and producer Essam Jansen recorded a dance music version of the track under the name "Tech It Deep". This version peaked at number 63 on the UK Singles Chart for the week of May 5, 2023, by which time the original version had re-entered the chart at number 51. In November 2023, the cover was certified silver by the British Phonographic Industry (BPI) for sales and streaming figures exceeding 200,000 units.

== Track listings ==
US CD and cassette single

1. "Maria Maria" – 4:21
2. "Maria Maria" (Wyclef remix) – 4:21
3. "Migra" – 5:54

US maxi-CD single

1. "Maria Maria" (album version) – 4:21
2. "Maria Maria" (Wyclef remix) – 4:21
3. "Maria Maria" (Pumpin' Dolls radio edit) – 3:56
4. "Maria Maria" (Pumpin' Dolls club mix) – 8:36
5. "Maria Maria" (Wyclef Remix instrumental) – 4:21
6. "Migra" (album version) – 5:54

US 7-inch single

1. "Maria Maria" – 4:21
2. "Smooth" (featuring Rob Thomas)

UK CD and cassette single

1. "Maria Maria" (radio mix) – 4:21
2. "Maria Maria" (Wyclef remix) – 4:21
3. "Maria Maria" (Pumpin' Dolls remix) – 3:56

European CD single

1. "Maria Maria" (radio mix) – 4:21
2. "Maria Maria" (Pumpin' Dolls club mix) – 8:36

European maxi-CD and Australian CD single

1. "Maria Maria" (radio mix) – 4:21
2. "Maria Maria" (Pumpin' Dolls radio edit) – 3:56
3. "Maria Maria" (Wyclef remix) – 4:21
4. "Maria Maria" (Pumpin' Dolls club mix) – 8:36
5. "Maria Maria" (Wyclef remix instrumental) – 4:21
6. "Maria Maria" (Pumpin' Dolls club mix instrumental) – 8:36

== Credits and personnel ==
Credits are taken from the Supernatural booklet and Stereogum.

Studios

- Mixed at The Hit Factory (New York City)
- Engineered at The Hit Factory (New York City) and Fantasy Studios (Berkeley, California, US)
- Mastered at Sterling Sound (New York City)

Personnel

- Wyclef Jean – writing, drum programming, production
- Jerry "Wonda" Duplessis – writing, bass, drum programming, production
- Carlos Santana – writing, additional vocals, guitar
- Karl Perazzo – writing
- Raul Rekow – writing
- The Product G&B – lead vocals
- Joseph Hébert – cello
- Daniel Seidenberg – viola
- Hari Balakrishnan – viola
- Jeremy Cohen – violin
- Andy Grassi – mixing, engineering
- Michael McCoy – mixing assistant
- Chris Theis – engineering
- Steve Fontano – engineering
- Chuck Bailey – engineering assistant
- Jason Groucott – engineering assistant
- Ted Jensen – mastering

== Charts ==
=== Weekly charts ===
2000 weekly chart performance for "Maria Maria"
Chart (2000)	Peak position
Australia (ARIA)	49
Austria (Ö3 Austria Top 40)	3
Belgium (Ultratop 50 Flanders)	6
Belgium (Ultratop 50 Wallonia)	2
Canada Top Singles (RPM)	1
Canada Adult Contemporary (RPM)	22
Canada Dance/Urban (RPM)	18
Czech Republic (IFPI)	17
Denmark (IFPI)	2
Europe (Eurochart Hot 100)	1
France (SNEP)	1
France Airplay (SNEP)	1
Germany (GfK)	1
Greece (IFPI Greece)	4
Hungary (Mahasz)	1
Iceland (Íslenski Listinn Topp 40)	3
Ireland (IRMA)	21
Netherlands (Dutch Top 40)	2
Netherlands (Single Top 100)	2
New Zealand (Recorded Music NZ)	49
Norway (VG-lista)	7
Portugal (AFP)	6
Romania (Romanian Top 100)	4
Scottish Singles Sales (Official Charts)	26
Spain (Promusicae)	13
Sweden (Sverigetopplistan)	1
Switzerland (Schweizer Hitparade)	1
UK Singles (Official Charts)	6
UK Hip Hop/R&B (Official Charts)	2
US Billboard Hot 100	1
US Adult Pop Airplay (Billboard)	12
US Dance Singles Sales (Billboard)	1
US Hot R&B/Hip-Hop Songs (Billboard)	1
US Pop Airplay (Billboard)	2
US Rhythmic Airplay (Billboard)	7

2025 weekly chart performance for "Maria Maria"
Chart (2025)	Peak position
Israel International Airplay (Media Forest)	12

=== Year-end charts ===
Year-end chart performance for "Maria Maria"
Chart (2000)	Position
Austria (Ö3 Austria Top 40)	39
Belgium (Ultratop 50 Flanders)	36
Belgium (Ultratop 50 Wallonia)	4
Brazil (Crowley)	11
Denmark (IFPI)	12
Europe (Eurochart Hot 100)	2
France (SNEP)	8
Germany (Media Control)	7
Iceland (Íslenski Listinn Topp 40)	44
Netherlands (Dutch Top 40)	11
Netherlands (Single Top 100)	10
Romania (Romanian Top 100)	80
Sweden (Hitlistan)	18
Switzerland (Schweizer Hitparade)	2
UK Singles (OCC)	133
UK Urban (Music Week)	33
US Billboard Hot 100	3
US Adult Top 40 (Billboard)	50
US Hot R&B/Hip-Hop Singles & Tracks (Billboard)	15
US Mainstream Top 40 (Billboard)	15
US Rhythmic Top 40 (Billboard)	21

=== Decade-end charts ===
Decade-end chart performance for "Maria Maria"
Chart (2000–2009)	Position
Germany (Media Control GfK)	83
Netherlands (Single Top 100)	59
US Billboard Hot 100	14

=== All-time charts ===
All-time chart performance for "Maria Maria"
Chart	Position
US Billboard Hot 100	122
US Hot 100 Latin Songs (Billboard)	2

== Certifications ==
Certifications and sales for "Maria Maria"
Region	Certification	Certified units/sales
Belgium (BRMA)	Platinum	50,000^{*}
Denmark (IFPI Danmark)	Platinum	90,000^{‡}
France (SNEP)	Platinum	500,000^{*}
Germany (BVMI)	Platinum	500,000^{^}
Italy (FIMI)	Gold	50,000^{‡}
Netherlands (NVPI)	Gold	50,000^{^}
New Zealand (RMNZ)	3× Platinum	90,000^{‡}
Sweden (GLF)	Gold	15,000^{^}
Switzerland (IFPI Switzerland)	Platinum	50,000^{^}
United Kingdom (BPI)	Platinum	600,000^{‡}
United Kingdom (BPI) Tech It Deep version	Silver	200,000^{‡}
United States (RIAA)	Platinum	1,337,000
^{*} Sales figures based on certification alone.^{^} Shipments figures based on certification alone.^{‡} Sales+streaming figures based on certification alone.

== Release history ==
Release dates and formats for "Maria Maria"
Region	Date	Format(s)	Label(s)	Ref(s).
United States	September 14, 1999	Rhythmic contemporary; urban radio	Arista	
United States	November 23, 1999	Contemporary hit radio	Arista	
United States	January 25, 2000	7-inch vinyl; CD; maxi-CD; cassette	Arista	
Sweden	January 31, 2000	CD	Arista	
Europe	February 7, 2000	CD	Arista	
United Kingdom	July 24, 2000	CD; cassette	Arista	
