= Dante Ross =

American music executive (born 1965)

- Born: Dante Andres Ross; October 11, 1965 (age 60); San Francisco, California, U.S.
- Origin: Manhattan, New York City, U.S.
- Genres: Hip hop
- Occupations: Record producer; A&R
- Instruments: Drum machine; sampler
- Years active: 1987–present
- Labels: Tommy Boy; Elektra; Warner Bros.; https://www.stimulatedmusic.com/

Dante Ross (born October 11, 1965) is an American music industry executive, A&R representative, and record producer. He was named one of the top-25 greatest A&R representatives in hip-hop by Complex magazine. Ross has been in his career a tour manager, an A&R person, a record producer, a notable songwriter, and an artist manager.

== Early life ==
Ross was born in San Francisco, California, to political activist parents John Ross and mother Norma. He moved to New York City in 1967. Ross was raised by his mother in New York's Lower East Side, then a predominantly Puerto Rican neighborhood, where his mother was a nursery school teacher. Ross spent his teen years skateboarding, writing graffiti, and going to see punk rock shows with teenage friends who would eventually become members of the Beastie Boys, the Cro-Mags and Luscious Jackson. As a young man in the early 1980s, he hung out at the Mudd Club, Danceteria, and The Roxy while still in high school. He frequently went to see live music at CBGB where he often saw the Bad Brains who befriended a young Ross. Ross became friends with many notable punk and hardcore groups as well as various future creatives. He credits this along with watching his friends the Beastie Boys' success with him wanting to work in the music business.

== Career ==
Ross entered the music business when he was hired as a messenger at the behest of the Beastie Boys and their road manager Sean Carasov at the newly formed Def Jam Recordings. Ross was mentored by Lyor Cohen and Russell Simmons for several years before going to work as an A&R person at Tommy Boy Records, where he signed and handled the careers of such artists as De La Soul, Queen Latifah, and Digital Underground. Ross was then hired by Elektra Records and was the first person hired by a major label to be specifically a hip-hop A&R person, where he was considered one of the architects of the golden age of hip hop. Ross helped assemble Elektra Records hip-hop roster where he signed acts Brand Nubian, Grand Puba, Del the Funky Homosapien, Pete Rock & CL Smooth, KMD (featuring a young MF Doom), Leaders of the New School, Busta Rhymes and Ol' Dirty Bastard.

As a producer Ross was a third of the Stimulated Dummies production team with partners John Gamble (1960-2020) and Geeby Dajani (1961-2019). The production team worked with artists such as Brand Nubian, Grand Puba, Leaders of the New School, 3rd Bass, and Del the Funky Homosapien. Gamble and Ross later went on to produce Carlos Santana, Everlast (working on both the multi-platinum album Whitey Ford Sings the Blues and the gold follow-up Eat at Whitey's), and many others. Ross earned a Grammy Award in 2000 for his work on Santana's Supernatural for his production on the song "Put Your Lights On" featuring Everlast. The song would also win a Grammy for Best Rock Performance by a Duo or Group with Vocal. Ross would also write and produce the Anthony Hamilton and Santana duet on Santana's gold album All That I Am. Ross' production work has also appeared on Eminem's 8 Mile soundtrack, on which he produced and co-wrote two songs that featured Macy Gray and Young Zee. Ross has also been enlisted for his remixing skills, which have been featured on songs by KoЯn as well as a plethora of other artists in genres as diverse as Nu metal, Dancehall, Neo-Soul, and Hip-Hop.

Ross is credited with championing Macklemore while at Warner Brothers records, which lead him to becoming the VP of A and R at ADA in 2012. He would go on to sign Lil Dicky, and MadeinTYO who both were awarded platinum records in 2016. Ugly God, his first signing to the relaunched Asylum Records, was awarded a platinum single in June 2017. He served as senior vice president of A&R at ADA Music, the independent distribution company owned by the Warner Music Group from 2013-2017. In 2017 Ross served as senior vice president of A&R for the newly re-activated Asylum Records where he signed Sada_Baby before leaving the label in early 2020. Ross' first book, a memoir Son of The City, was published by Rare Bird lit in May 2023.

In 2023, Ross partnered with Roc Nations distribution company to relaunch Stimulated Music. In addition, Ross served as a producer and music supervisor on A and E's Ol' Dirty Bastard documentary, A Tale of Two Dirtys.

Year	Nominee / work	Award	Result	Ref.
1999	Supernatural	Grammy Award for Album of the Year	Won	
