= Supernatural (Santana album) =

Studio album by Santana
- Released: June 15, 1999
- Recorded: 1997–1999
- Studio: Fantasy (Berkeley, California): The Hit Factory (New York City)
- Genre: Latin rock
- Length: 74:59
- Label: Arista
- Producers: Carlos Santana; Clive Davis; Jerry 'Wonder' Duplessis; The Dust Brothers; Alex González; Charles Goodan; Lauryn Hill; Art Hodge; Wyclef Jean; Fher Olvera; K.C. Porter; Dante Ross; Matt Serletic; Stephen Harris

Santana chronology
The Best of Santana (1998)	Supernatural (1999)	The Best of Santana Vol. 2 (2000)

Singles from Supernatural
- 1. "Smooth" Released: June 15, 1999; 2. "Put Your Lights On" Released: August 24, 1999; 3. "Maria Maria" Released: September 14, 1999; 4. "Corazón Espinado" Released: May 30, 2000; 5. "Love of My Life" Released: August 7, 2000; 6. "Primavera" Released: 2001

Supernatural is the eighteenth studio album by the American rock band Santana, released on June 15, 1999, on Arista Records. After Santana found itself without a label in the mid-1990s, founding member and guitarist Carlos Santana began talks with Arista president Clive Davis, who had originally signed the group to Columbia Records in 1969. Santana and Davis worked with A&R man Pete Ganbarg, as Santana wanted to focus on pop and radio-friendly material. The album features collaborations with several contemporary guest artists, including Rob Thomas, Eric Clapton, Everlast, Eagle-Eye Cherry, Lauryn Hill, Dave Matthews, Maná, and CeeLo Green.

Supernatural was a huge commercial success worldwide, generating renewed interest in Santana's music. It reached No. 1 in eleven countries, including the US for 12 non-consecutive weeks, where it is certified 15× platinum. The first of six singles from the album, "Smooth" featuring Matchbox Twenty singer Rob Thomas, and co-written by Thomas and Itaal Shur, was a number one success worldwide and topped the Billboard Hot 100 chart for 12 weeks. The next, "Maria Maria", featuring the Product G&B, was number one in the US for 10 weeks. Supernatural is Santana's best-selling album to date, the best-selling album by a Latino artist in music history, and one of the best-selling albums of all time, selling an estimated 30 million copies worldwide.

At the 2000 Grammy Awards, Supernatural won nine Grammy Awards, breaking the record held by Michael Jackson's Thriller for the most honored album. These included Album of the Year and Best Rock Album. "Smooth" won Song of the Year for Thomas and Shur. Santana also won three Latin Grammy Awards including Record of the Year. In 2025, it was inducted into the Grammy Hall of Fame.

== Background ==
After Santana's record deal with Columbia Records came to an end in 1991, the band's two subsequent albums for Polydor/Island, Milagro (1992) and Sacred Fire: Live in South America (1993), failed to attract strong sales and chart positions. Founding member and guitarist Carlos Santana felt the label was not giving the band any "traction and acceleration". In October 1996, he met Island founder Chris Blackwell in New York City, where he asked for his release. Santana told Blackwell that he had "a masterpiece" album in him, but felt Island was not the right label for such plans. Blackwell subsequently travelled to Santana's home in Sausalito, California, in an attempt to change the guitarist's mind, but Santana persisted and he was released from the label without paying compensation for the early termination.

Santana, along with band manager Greg DiGiovine and attorney John Branca, approached several labels, but they struggled to find one suitable and the guitarist recalled that some considered him too old. In 1995, he was invited to participate in a documentary about Arista founder Clive Davis, who first signed the band to Columbia in 1969. Santana, with encouragement from his wife, approached Davis about the possibility of signing with Arista. Eventually Santana, DiGiovine and Branca scored interest from three labels: Arista, EMI, and Tommy Boy; the three were most interested in EMI, however, as it was willing to pay as much as four times as much money than the others. In early 1997, Santana entered the studio to start on Supernatural while the contract was being finalized, but he soon had second thoughts as he recognised Davis' ability to generate hit records. After the contract was scrapped in May 1997, Santana reconnected with Davis and later said he "Didn't rub it in my face. He said the company was still interested." However, Davis needed to see if the band was still a commercially viable attraction, so Santana invited him to attend the band's upcoming concert at Radio City Music Hall in July, which featured a new line-up of the group. Davis was impressed and offered to sign the band.

Davis agreed to sign Santana on the condition that he have some creative input. This did not bother the guitarist, as he felt "safe" with Davis and knew he would not be told to play anything "crass." Santana complied and expressed his desire to produce more radio-friendly songs with strong melodies and lyrics that appealed to a broad audience. He convinced Davis that he "wasn't stuck in the ’60s; I was adaptable to these times", and cited Miles Davis and John Coltrane as artists who had successful changes in musical direction toward pop in their later careers. Davis wanted Supernatural to surpass the sales of the band's best selling album, Abraxas (1970), their second, which by that time had sold over 4 million copies in the US. Davis wanted half the album to be "vintage Santana" in the style of the band’s early hit song "Oye Como Va", and the other to be "the most natural" collaborations of "contemporary influences that Carlos was very much feeling." He found the task of contacting potential artists to collaborate with him particularly exciting. Santana maintained that Supernatural was never meant to be "star-studded" at first, "but the songs really dictated different singers and different musicians." The album was initially titled Mumbo Jumbo, but it was changed shortly before its release. Davis threw a release party for the album at the Boathouse restaurant in New York City on June 1, 1999.

== Songs ==
"The Calling" features guitarist Eric Clapton, who had attended the 1999 Grammy Awards ceremony which featured Santana performing with Lauryn Hill and asked Santana to call him if there was room for him on a future Santana track.

"Love of My Life" is a reworking of the third movement of Brahms’ Symphony No.3 in F major, which Carlos Santana called a "glorious piece of music".

== Critical reception ==
Professional ratings
Review scores
Source	Rating
AllMusic	4/5 stars
Entertainment Weekly	B+
Christgau's Consumer Guide	(choice cut)
Rolling Stone	3.5/5 stars

Stephen Thomas Erlewine of AllMusic noted that "there doesn't seem to be a track that doesn't have a guest star, which brings up the primary problem with the album [...] it never develops a consistent voice that holds the album together." He added that the album is "directionless" but concluded by saying "the peak moments of Supernatural are some of Santana's best music of the '90s, which does make it a successful comeback." Rolling Stone writer David Wild also noted the number of featured artists on the album. He goes on to say "Not everything is quite so appealing", mentioning the song "Do You Like the Way" featuring Lauryn Hill and CeeLo Green, saying that it "seems a bit more forced."

== Commercial performance ==
The album is one of the best-selling albums in the world, and has sold over 30 million copies worldwide, with 11.8 million copies sold in the United States alone. It is the best-selling album by a Latino artist, peaking at number one in many countries.

According to the Guinness World Records in 2005, it was the band's first album to peak at number one on the Billboard 200 since Santana III in 1971, making it the longest gap between two number-one albums, 28 years in total.

Arista had planned for an initial shipment of 125,000 copies, but the high level of interest in the album through word of mouth caused this to rise to 210,000. By the first week of June 1999, after the label issued a sample album to promoters, this number rose to 350,000. The album debuted at number 19 on the US Billboard 200 and eventually peaked at number one in October 1999, selling 169,000 copies that week, it would increase its sales even more in the following weeks, selling 183,000 and 199,000 on its first three weeks atop. Its highest sale came in year's final week when it sold 527,000 copies. Sales would still stay high into the new year, selling 583,000 copies and after winning nine Grammy Awards in a night, it sold another 441,000 copies. Its last of 12 non-consecutive weeks at number one would still see huge sales, 307,000 copies that week, it later was replaced by NSYNC's No Strings Attached after selling 2.4 million copies in a week. It also debuted and peaked at number one on the Billboard Top Latin Albums chart. However, it was removed from the chart the following week for not meeting the requirement of having at least 50% of its tracks recorded in Spanish. It was ranked on Billboard's top 200 albums of the decade as the ninth best-selling album of the 2000s.

In Australia, the album debuted at number 48 and would peak at number one on March 6, 2000. In the UK, the album peaked at number one for two weeks starting on April 1, 2000.

== Singles ==
Copies of the first single, "Smooth", had been leaked prior to the intended June 15 radio release date and were picked up by some radio stations which began to air the song in late May. "Smooth" featured Rob Thomas on vocals, and peaked at No. 1 on the US Billboard Hot 100 for 12 weeks while it went to No. 3 in the UK and No. 4 in Australia. The next two singles were "Put Your Lights On" and "Maria Maria"; the former song was serviced to rock radio on August 24, 1999, while the latter was added to urban radio on September 14, 1999. "Maria Maria" peaked at No. 1 on the US Billboard Hot 100 for 10 weeks, No. 6 in the UK and No. 49 in Australia while "Put Your Lights On" peaked at No. 18 on the US Bubbling Under Hot 100 Singles chart, No. 97 in the UK, and was a minor hit in Australia at No. 32. The fourth single, "Corazón Espinado" featuring Maná, was released on May 30, 2000, and was a top-10 hit in Spain. On August 7, 2000, "Love of My Life" was serviced to US hot and modern adult contemporary radio.

== Track listing ==
Supernatural track listing
No.	Title	Writer(s)	Producer(s)	Length
1.	"(Da Le) Yaleo"	Carlos Santana; Shakara Mutela; Christian Polloni	Santana	5:51
2.	"Love of My Life" (featuring Dave Matthews and Carter Beauford)	Santana; David Matthews	Stephen Harris; Santana	5:48
3.	"Put Your Lights On" (featuring Everlast)	Erik Schrody	Dante Ross; John Gamble	4:47
4.	"Africa Bamba"	Santana; Ismaïla Touré; Sixu Touré; Karl Perazzo	Santana	4:40
5.	"Smooth" (featuring Rob Thomas)	Robert Thomas; Itaal Shur	Matt Serletic	4:56
6.	"Do You Like the Way" (featuring Lauryn Hill and CeeLo Green)	Lauryn Hill	Hill	5:52
7.	"Maria Maria" (featuring the Product G&B)	Santana; David McRae; Marvin Moore-Hough; Nelust Jean; Jerry Duplessis; Raul Rekow; Perazzo	Wyclef Jean; Duplessis	4:21
8.	"Migra"	Santana; Rachid Taha; Anthony Lindsay	KC Porter; Santana	5:24
9.	"Corazón Espinado" (featuring Maná)	José Olvera	Olvera; KC Porter; Alex González	4:32
10.	"Wishing It Was" (featuring Eagle-Eye Cherry)	Eagle-Eye Cherry; Michael Simpson; John King; Mark Nishita; Karl Porter	The Dust Brothers; Charles Goodan; Art Hodge	4:59
11.	"El Farol"	Santana; Porter	KC Porter	4:49
12.	"Primavera"	Porter; J.B. Eckl; Cheín García	Porter	6:17
13.	"The Calling" (featuring Eric Clapton)	Santana; Chester Thompson; Frederick Stone; Larry Graham	Santana	12:27

Mastered by Ted Jensen

Notes

- The total length of track 13 is actually 12:27. "The Calling" ends at 7:48. Hidden track "Day of Celebration" starts at 8:00 and has a length 4:27. The track listing and timing are the same on the 2010 "Legacy Edition". However, separate musician and production credits are listed for "Day of Celebration" in the liner notes, unlike the standard edition.
- (*) Asterisk notes co-producer.

A "Legacy Edition" of Supernatural was released on February 16, 2010, with a new Santana-supervised remastering.

Supernatural Legacy Edition disc two track listing
No.	Title	Length
1.	"Bacalao con Pan"	5:08
2.	"Angel Love (Come for Me)" (featuring The Product G&B)	4:42
3.	"Rain Down on Me" (featuring Dave Matthews and Carter Beauford)	4:01
4.	"Corazon Espinado" (Spanish Dance Remix featuring Maná)	8:49
5.	"One Fine Morning" (Lighthouse cover)	5:19
6.	"Exodus/Get Up Stand Up" (Bob Marley cover)	6:09
7.	"Ya Yo Me Cure"	4:17
8.	"Maria Maria" (Pumpin' Dolls Club Mix)	8:39
9.	"Smooth" (instrumental)	4:56
10.	"The Calling Jam" (featuring Eric Clapton)	4:30
11.	"Olympic Festival"	6:10

== Personnel ==
"(Da Le) Yaleo"

- Carlos Santana – guitar, vocals
- Chester D. Thompson – keyboards
- Benny Rietveld – bass
- Billy Johnson – drums
- Karl Perazzo – percussion, vocals
- Raul Rekow – congas
- Tony Lindsay – vocals
- Jose Abel Figueroa – trombone
- Mic Gillette – trombone, trumpet
- Marvin McFadden – trumpet

"Love of My Life"

- This song's main melody is derived from Brahms' symphony No. 3 in F Major Op 90 Movement #3.
- Carlos Santana – guitar
- Dave Matthews – lead vocal
- George Whitty – keyboards
- Benny Rietveld – bass
- Carter Beauford – drums
- Karl Perazzo – congas and percussion

"Maria Maria"

- Carlos Santana – guitar, background vocals
- The Product G&B – lead vocals
- Joseph Herbert – cello
- Daniel Seidenberg – viola
- Hari Balakrisnan – viola
- Jeremy Cohen – violin

"Africa Bamba"

- Carlos Santana – guitar, lead vocals, background vocals
- Chester D. Thompson – keyboards
- Benny Rietveld – bass
- Horacio Hernandez – drums
- Raul Rekow – congas
- Karl Perazzo – vamp out vocals, background vocals, percussion
- Tony Lindsay – background vocals

"Smooth"

- Carlos Santana – lead guitar
- Rob Thomas – lead vocals
- Chester D. Thompson – keyboards
- Benny Rietveld – bass
- Rodney Holmes – drums
- Karl Perazzo – percussion
- Raul Rekow – congas
- Jeff Cressman – trombone
- Jose Abel Figueroa – trombone
- Julius Melendez – trumpet
- William Ortiz – trumpet

"Do You Like the Way"

- Carlos Santana – lead guitar
- Lauryn Hill – lead and background vocals
- Cee-Lo Green – lead vocals
- Francis Dunnery, Al Anderson – rhythm guitar
- Loris Holland – keyboards
- Kobie Brown, Che Pope – programming
- Tom Barney – bass
- Lenesha Randolph – background vocals
- Danny Wolinski – saxophone and flute
- Steve Touré – trombone
- Earl Gardner – trumpet and flugelhorn
- Joseph Daley – tuba

"Put Your Lights On"

- Carlos Santana – lead guitar, congas and percussion
- Everlast – rhythm guitar and lead vocal
- Chester D. Thompson – keyboards
- Dante Ross, John Gamble – programming
- Benny Rietveld – bass

"Migra"

- Carlos Santana – guitar and sleigh bells
- Chester D. Thompson – keyboards
- K.C. Porter – programming, accordion and vocals
- Benny Rietveld – bass
- Rodney Holmes – drums
- Karl Perazzo – percussion and vocals
- Raul Rekow – congas
- Tony Lindsay – vocals
- Ramon Flores – trombone
- Mic Gillette – trombone, trumpet
- Jose Abel Figueroa – trumpet
- Marvin McFadden – trumpet

"Corazón Espinado"

- Carlos Santana – lead guitar
- Fher Olvera – lead vocals
- Sergio Vallín – rhythm guitar
- Alberto Salas – keyboards
- Chester D. Thompson – keyboards
- Juan Calleros – bass
- Alex González – drums and background vocals
- Karl Perazzo – timbales and percussion
- Raul Rekow – congas
- Gonzalo Chomat – background vocals
- Jose Quintana – vocal direction

"Wishing It Was"

- Carlos Santana – lead and rhythm guitar
- Eagle-Eye Cherry – lead vocal
- Chad & Earl – background vocals
- Chester D. Thompson – keyboards
- Benny Rietveld – bass
- Rodney Holmes – drums
- Karl Perazzo – timbales and percussion
- Raul Rekow – congas and percussion
- Humberto Hernandez – additional percussion

"El Farol"

- Carlos Santana – lead guitar
- Raul Pacheco – rhythm guitar and percussion
- K.C. Porter – keyboards and programming
- Chester D. Thompson – keyboards and programming
- Benny Rietveld – bass
- Gregg Bissonette – drums
- Karl Perazzo – timbales
- Raul Rekow – congas

"Primavera"

- Carlos Santana – lead guitar, background vocals
- J. B. Eckl – rhythm guitar
- K.C. Porter – lead vocals, keyboards, programming, background vocals
- Chester D. Thompson – keyboards
- Mike Porcaro – bass
- Jimmy Keegan – drums
- Karl Perazzo – timbales and percussion, background vocals
- Luis Conte – congas and percussion
- Fher – background vocals
- Tony Lindsay – background vocals
- Chein Garcia Alonso – Spanish translation

"The Calling"

- Eric Clapton – lead and rhythm guitar
- Carlos Santana – lead and rhythm guitar, percussions
- Chester D. Thompson – keyboards
- Mike Mani – programming
- Tony Lindsay – vocals
- Jeanie Tracy – vocals
- Andre for Screaming Lizard – Pro Tools editing

== Charts ==
=== Weekly charts ===
Chart (1999–2001)	Peak position
Australian Albums (ARIA)	1
Austrian Albums (Ö3 Austria)	1
Belgian Albums (Ultratop Flanders)	2
Belgian Albums (Ultratop Wallonia)	2
Canadian Albums (RPM)	1
Danish Albums (Hitlisten)	4
Dutch Albums (Album Top 100)	1
European Albums (Billboard)	1
Finnish Albums (Suomen virallinen lista)	2
French Albums (SNEP)	1
German Albums (Offizielle Top 100)	1
Greek Albums (IFPI)	1
Hungarian Albums (MAHASZ)	1
Icelandic Albums (Tónlistinn)	1
Irish Albums (IRMA)	2
Italian Albums (FIMI)	1
Japanese Albums (Oricon)	11
New Zealand Albums (RMNZ)	1
Norwegian Albums (VG-lista)	1
Portuguese Albums (AFP)	1
Scottish Albums (Official Charts)	2
Spanish Albums (AFYVE)	1
Swedish Albums (Sverigetopplistan)	1
Swiss Albums (Schweizer Hitparade)	1
UK Albums (Official Charts)	1
US Billboard 200	1

=== Year-end charts ===
Chart (1999)	Position
Australian Albums (ARIA)	26
Canadian Albums (RPM)	16
European Albums (Music & Media)	94
German Albums (Offizielle Top 100)	56

Chart (2000)	Position
Australian Albums (ARIA)	19
Austrian Albums (Ö3 Austria)	2
Belgian Albums (Ultratop Flanders)	11
Belgian Albums (Ultratop Wallonia)	4
Canadian Albums (Nielsen SoundScan)	5
Danish Albums (Hitlisten)	7
Dutch Albums (Album Top 100)	4
European Albums (Music & Media)	1
French Albums (SNEP)	2
German Albums (Offizielle Top 100)	1
New Zealand Albums (RMNZ)	4
Singaporean English Albums (SPVA)	2
South Korean International Albums (MIAK)	17
Swedish Albums & Compilations (Sverigetopplistan)	10
Swiss Albums (Schweizer Hitparade)	1
UK Albums (OCC)	18
US Billboard 200	2

Chart (2001)	Position
French Albums (SNEP)	97

== Certifications and sales ==
Region	Certification	Certified units/sales
Argentina (CAPIF)	2× Platinum	120,000^{^}
Australia (ARIA) DVD	6× Platinum	90,000^{^}
Australia (ARIA)	4× Platinum	280,000^{^}
Austria (IFPI Austria)	2× Platinum	100,000^{*}
Belgium (BRMA)	2× Platinum	100,000^{*}
Brazil (Pro-Música Brasil)	Platinum	250,000^{*}
Canada (Music Canada)	Diamond	1,000,000^{^}
Denmark (IFPI Danmark)	Platinum	57,531
Finland (Musiikkituottajat)	Platinum	50,291
France (SNEP)	2× Platinum	600,000^{*}
Germany (BVMI)	2× Platinum	1,000,000^{^}
Greece (IFPI Greece)	Gold	15,000^{^}
Hungary (MAHASZ)	Gold	
Italy 1999 - 2006 sales	—	680,000
Italy (FIMI) sales since 2009	Gold	25,000^{‡}
Japan (RIAJ)	Platinum	200,000^{^}
Mexico (AMPROFON)	2× Platinum	300,000^{^}
Netherlands (NVPI)	2× Platinum	200,000^{^}
New Zealand (RMNZ)	4× Platinum	60,000^{^}
Poland (ZPAV) DVD	Platinum	10,000^{*}
Poland (ZPAV)	Platinum	100,000^{*}
Singapore (SPVA)	4× Platinum	55,000
South Korea	—	126,158
Spain (Promusicae)	3× Platinum	300,000^{^}
Sweden (GLF)	Platinum	80,000^{^}
Switzerland (IFPI Switzerland)	4× Platinum	200,000^{^}
United Kingdom (BPI)	3× Platinum	971,798
United States (RIAA) DVD	3× Platinum	300,000^{^}
United States (RIAA)	15× Platinum	13,060,000
Summaries
Europe (IFPI)	6× Platinum	6,000,000^{*}
Worldwide	—	30,000,000
^{*} Sales figures based on certification alone.^{^} Shipments figures based on certification alone.^{‡} Sales+streaming figures based on certification alone.

== Release history ==
Region	Date	Label	Edition	Ref.
United States	June 15, 1999	Arista	Standard	
Canada	June 15, 1999	Sony Canada	Standard	
France	June 21, 1999	Arista	Standard	
United Kingdom	August 16, 1999	Arista	Standard	
United States	February 16, 2010	Arista; Legacy	Deluxe	
United States	August 2, 2019	Arista; Legacy	LP	

== See also ==
- List of best-selling albums
- List of best-selling albums in the United States
- List of Billboard 200 number-one albums of 1999
- List of UK Albums Chart number ones of the 2000s
