= Black Jesus (song) =

2000 song by Everlast

Single by Everlast

from the album Eat at Whitey's
- B-side: "Children's Story"; "Graves to Dig"
- Released: 18 September 2000
- Recorded: 2000
- Studio: SD Studios (New York City)
- Genre: Blues rock, alternative rock, alternative hip hop
- Label: Tommy Boy
- Songwriter: E. Schrody

Everlast singles chronology
"Painkillers" (1999)	"Black Jesus" (2000)	"Deadly Assassins" (2001)

"Black Jesus" is a song by American singer Everlast. It was released in September 2000 as the lead single from his third album, Eat at Whitey's.

== Content ==
The lyrics of the song are not about religion, as Everlast sings about how his career has had its ups and downs.

== Music video ==
The video was directed by Jonas Åkerlund, and featured Everlast walking around the streets of London and the London Underground, passing very strange people, makes it to the top, and walks past clowns and little people. The video later ends when Everlast has made it to the top of a building. Two parts of the video were cut for TV, mainly the part where he is walking along the road and gets hit by car, and at the end of video where Everlast jumps off the top of the building.

== Track listing ==
1. "Black Jesus" (radio edit) – 4:20
2. "Children's Story" (featuring Rahzel) – 3:20
3. "Graves to Dig" – 3:23
4. "Black Jesus" (album version)

== Chart performance ==
Chart performance for "Black Jesus"
Chart (2000–2001)	Peak position
Australia (ARIA)	80
Netherlands (Single Top 100)	96
Scottish Singles Sales (Official Charts)	36
Sweden (Sverigetopplistan)	13
Switzerland (Schweizer Hitparade)	86
UK Singles (Official Charts)	34
UK Indie (Official Charts)	9
US Billboard Mainstream Rock Tracks	30
US Billboard Modern Rock Tracks	15
