= Carl Stubner =

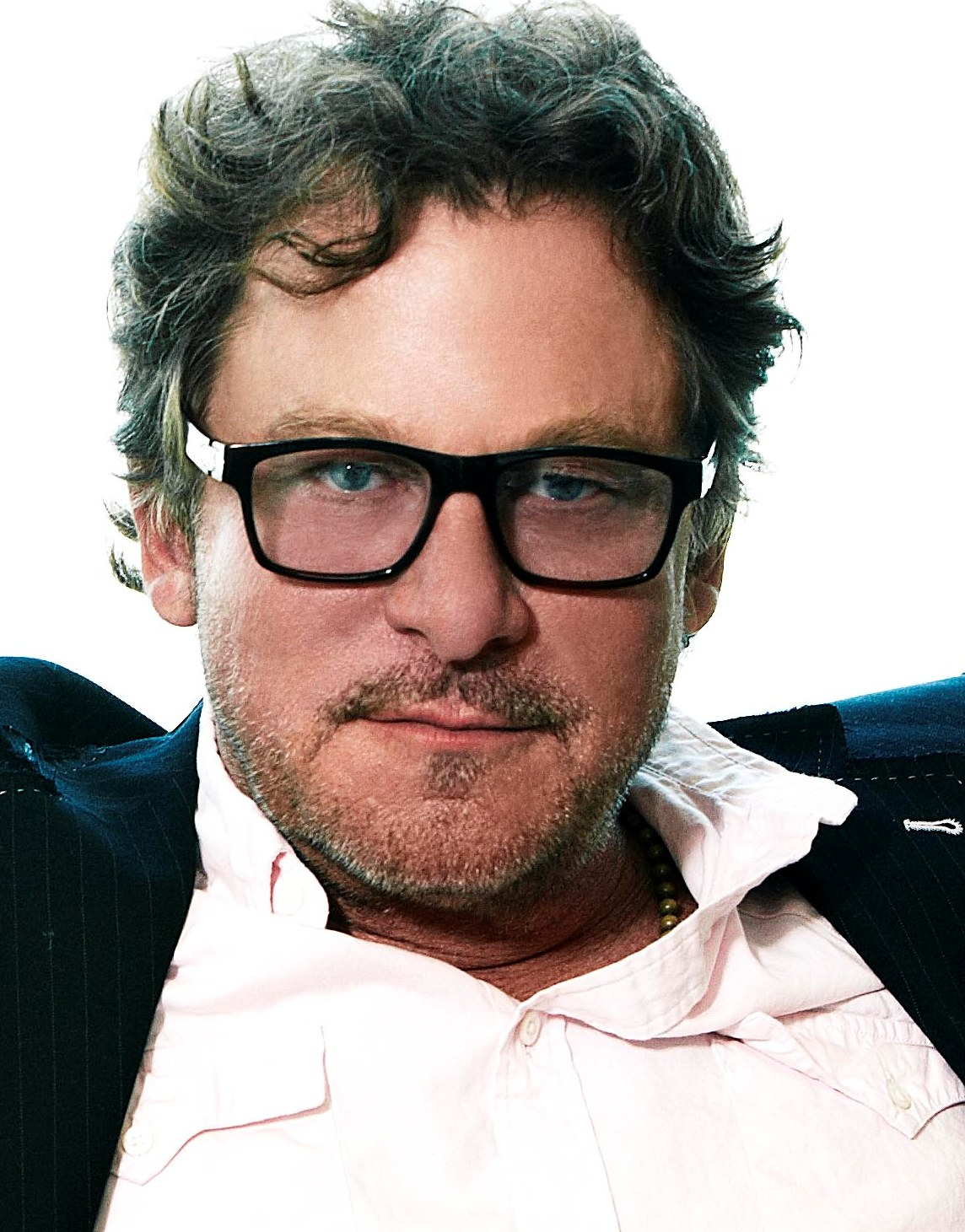

Background information
- Born: Philadelphia, Pennsylvania, United States
- Occupations: Chairman, Shelter Music Group
- Years active: 1988-present
- Website: https://www.sheltermusic.com

Carl Stubner is an American talent manager whose clients have included Fleetwood Mac, ZZ Top, and Andrew Dice Clay.

== Career ==
Stubner began his entertainment career in 1988 working in the mailroom of the management firm Gallin Morey Associates. There, he worked closely with comedian Andrew Dice Clay and later became his tour director.

In 1993, Stubner launched his own artist management company, Deluxe Entertainment, where he managed several acts including C+C Music Factory, House of Pain, and Mick Fleetwood. During this time, Stubner helped to reunite the members of Fleetwood Mac and worked with them for an MTV special and world tour.

In 1999, Deluxe merged into Eagle Cove Entertainment, where Stubner oversaw production on soundtracks including Dr. Dolittle II, Big Momma's House, Next Friday, and Detroit Rock City. Stubner signed Tommy Lee during this time; the duo collaborated on multimedia endeavors including records by Lee's Methods of Mayhem, solo albums, the autobiography Tommyland, and the TV shows Rock Star: Supernova, Tommy Lee Goes to College, and Battleground Earth.

In 2002, Stubner was made a partner at Immortal Entertainment and appointed president of the firm's music management division. He brought several acts to Immortal including The Cult, Everlast, Tommy Lee, and Mick Fleetwood.

In 2003, it was announced that Stubner would join Sanctuary Artist Management as co-president. By 2004, Stubner was named CEO of Sanctuary Artist Management and, shortly thereafter, he signed Texas rock band ZZ Top. As CEO of Sanctuary, he oversaw prominent acts, including Elton John, and was named CEO of Sanctuary Music Group under the new ownership. Stubner also opened a Nashville branch, expanding its country and rock artist rosters.
