= Smooth (song) =

1999 single by Santana

Single by Santana featuring Rob Thomas

from the album Supernatural
- B-side: "El farol"
- Released: June 15, 1999
- Studio: Fantasy (Berkeley, California)
- Genre: Latin rock; Latin soul; alternative rock
- Length: 4:55 (album version); 3:55 (radio edit)
- Label: Arista; BMG
- Composers: Itaal Shur; Rob Thomas
- Lyricist: Rob Thomas
- Producer: Matt Serletic

Santana singles chronology
| "Say It Again" (1985) | "Smooth" (1999) | "Put Your Lights On" (1999) |

Rob Thomas singles chronology
| "Smooth" (1999) | "A New York Christmas" (2003) |

Music video
- "Smooth" on YouTube

"Smooth" is a song performed by American rock band Santana and Rob Thomas of Matchbox Twenty, who sings the lead vocals. It was released to radio on June 15, 1999, as the lead single from Santana's 1999 studio album, Supernatural, and was physically released as a single in August. It was written by Itaal Shur and Thomas, who re-wrote Shur's original melody and lyrics, and produced by Matt Serletic.

The song was a top-40 hit in several countries. On the US Billboard Hot 100, it was the final number-one hit of the 1990s and the first number-one hit of the 2000s, and the only song to appear on two decade-end Billboard charts; the song spent 12 consecutive weeks at the top spot. "Smooth" was ranked as the second-most-successful song ever on Billboard's Hot 100 60th Anniversary listing. In 2000, the song won a Grammy Award for Record of the Year, Song of the Year, and Best Pop Collaboration with Vocals at the 42nd Annual Grammy Awards. "Smooth" also reached number one in Canada and number three in the UK and Ireland.

== Concept and background ==
"Smooth" was originally conceived by Itaal Shur as a song called "Room 17". The lyrics were stripped off as they were deemed too sexual by EMI Records, so the track was given to Rob Thomas, who re-wrote the lyrics and melody and re-titled it "Smooth". Within a few hours, Thomas had written the new chorus, after which he returned to Shur with the reworked song and recorded a demo to play for Santana. Thomas had originally not intended to perform the song's vocals and instead viewed "Smooth" as his "first foray into writing". George Michael was among the names considered to sing "Smooth", although Clive Davis and Matt Serletic suggested that Thomas sing it instead. Carlos Santana himself had approved Thomas's vocals in the demo and asked if he could do the full song, later telling the singer it reminded him of recording with Gregg Rolie on "Black Magic Woman".

Thomas cited his wife, "a beautiful Latin woman", as an inspiration for some of the lyrics, who he had recently met after moving to New York City. Upon hearing it, his wife insisted that it would be commercially successful. Knowing he was writing for Santana, Thomas also tried to add "Carlos-isms" reminiscent of his other tracks, such as the line "And it's just like the ocean under the moon".

Serletic (who produced Matchbox Twenty's debut album Yourself or Someone Like You in 1996) produced the song, and it was released from Santana's 1999 album Supernatural. The recording process took two days.

== Chart performance ==
By June 1, 1999, "Smooth" was leaked and played by some radio stations before its official release. The single became a chart-topping hit that summer, spending 12 consecutive weeks at number one on the Billboard Hot 100 beginning with the week of October 23, 1999. It was the first chart-topping hit in Carlos Santana's long-running career, peaking higher than his previously-biggest hit, "Black Magic Woman" (1971) which had peaked at number four. "Smooth" stayed in the top 10 of the Billboard Hot 100 for 30 weeks and the top 100 for 58 weeks. At the time, "Smooth" had the record for the most weeks in the top ten, eclipsing Savage Garden's "Truly Madly Deeply" record by four weeks. "Smooth" hit number one thirty years after Santana's first entry on the Billboard Hot 100 with "Jingo", making it the longest span of team between an artist's debut on the chart and their first time reaching number one.

During its original release, "Smooth" entered the top 40 in all countries in charted in. In the United Kingdom, "Smooth" first appeared at number 75 on the UK Singles Chart in October 1999. After a full release on March 20, 2000, it peaked at number three, spending eight weeks in the top 40. The song also peaked at number three in Ireland in March 2000, spending 10 weeks on the Irish Singles Chart. It remains Santana's highest-charting single in both the UK and Ireland. The song also peaked at number one on the RPM 100 Hit Tracks chart for a week in November 1999.

== Legacy ==
On Billboard magazine's rankings of the top songs of the first 50 years of the Billboard Hot 100 singles chart, "Smooth" was ranked as the number-two song overall and the number-one rock song in the history of the chart.

In the 21st century, particularly during the summer of 2016, the song became the subject of several internet memes. Writing for MTV, Sasha Geffen compared the situation to similar resurgences of "All Star" by Smash Mouth and "One Week" by the Barenaked Ladies, going on to attribute the song's popularity to "the merits of its vocal absurdity." They wrote, "There's something ridiculous about how eagerly Rob Thomas lays his earnest alt-rock croon over Santana's guitar, sweating out lines about how his 'Spanish Harlem Mona Lisa' is 'just like the ocean under the moon' without a hint of self-consciousness or irony".

== Track listings ==
US CD and cassette single

1. "Smooth" – 3:55
2. "El farol" – 4:59

UK 1999 CD single

1. "Smooth" – 3:55
2. "Smooth" (instrumental) – 4:55
3. "El farol" – 4:59

UK 2000 CD and cassette single

1. "Smooth" (radio edit) – 3:55
2. "Smooth" (dance radio mix) – 4:55
3. "Smooth" (instrumental) – 4:55

European CD single

1. "Smooth" (radio edit) – 3:55
2. "Smooth" (album version) – 4:55

Australian CD single

1. "Smooth" (radio edit) – 3:55
2. "Smooth" (album version) – 4:55
3. "Smooth" (instrumental) – 4:55

== Credits and personnel ==
Credits are taken from the Supernatural album booklet.

Studios

- Recorded at Fantasy Studios (Berkeley, California)
- Mixed at the Record Plant (New York City)
- Mastered at A&M Mastering Studios (Los Angeles, California)

Personnel

- Itaal Shur – music, lyrics
- Rob Thomas – lyrics, lead vocals
- Carlos Santana – lead guitar
- Benny Rietveld – bass
- Chester Thompson – keyboards
- Rodney Holmes – drums
- Raul Rekow – congas
- Karl Perazzo – percussion
- Jeff Cressman – trombone
- José Abel Figueroa – trombone
- Javier Melendez – trumpet
- William Ortiz – trumpet
- Matt Serletic – production
- David Thoener – recording, mixing
- Steve Fontano – recording assistance
- Andy Haller – mixing assistance
- Mark Dobson – programming and digital editing
- Stephen Marcussen – mastering

== Charts ==
=== Weekly charts ===
| Chart (1999–2000) | Peak position |
|---|---|
| Australia (ARIA) | 4 |
| Austria (Ö3 Austria Top 40) | 9 |
| Belgium (Ultratop 50 Flanders) | 30 |
| Canada Top Singles (RPM) | 1 |
| Canada Adult Contemporary (RPM) | 1 |
| Canada Rock/Alternative (RPM) | 1 |
| Canada CHR (Nielsen BDS) | 3 |
| Croatia (HRT) | 1 |
| Europe (Eurochart Hot 100) | 10 |
| Finland (Suomen virallinen lista) | 12 |
| France (SNEP) | 15 |
| Germany (GfK) | 21 |
| Greece (IFPI) | 2 |
| Iceland (Íslenski Listinn Topp 40) | 31 |
| Ireland (IRMA) | 3 |
| Italy (Musica e dischi) | 38 |
| Netherlands (Dutch Top 40) | 37 |
| Netherlands (Single Top 100) | 40 |
| New Zealand (Recorded Music NZ) | 18 |
| Portugal (AFP) | 5 |
| Scottish Singles Sales (Official Charts) | 2 |
| Switzerland (Schweizer Hitparade) | 18 |
| UK Singles (Official Charts) | 3 |
| US Billboard Hot 100 | 1 |
| US Adult Alternative Airplay (Billboard) | 1 |
| US Adult Contemporary (Billboard) | 11 |
| US Adult Pop Airplay (Billboard) | 1 |
| US Alternative Airplay (Billboard) | 24 |
| US Mainstream Rock Airplay (Billboard) | 10 |
| US Pop Airplay (Billboard) | 1 |
| US Rhythmic Airplay (Billboard) | 23 |

| Chart (2019) | Peak position |
|---|---|
| Poland Airplay (ZPAV) | 100 |

=== Year-end charts ===
| Chart (1999) | Position |
|---|---|
| Australia (ARIA) | 11 |
| Canada Top Singles (RPM) | 9 |
| Canada Adult Contemporary (RPM) | 50 |
| Canada Rock/Alternative (RPM) | 8 |
| New Zealand (RIANZ) | 36 |
| US Billboard Hot 100 | 19 |
| US Adult Top 40 (Billboard) | 16 |
| US Mainstream Rock Tracks (Billboard) | 35 |
| US Mainstream Top 40 (Billboard) | 24 |
| US Triple-A (Billboard) | 4 |

| Chart (2000) | Position |
|---|---|
| Brazil (Crowley) | 3 |
| Europe (Eurochart Hot 100) | 68 |
| France (SNEP) | 90 |
| Ireland (IRMA) | 34 |
| Switzerland (Schweizer Hitparade) | 95 |
| UK Singles (OCC) | 75 |
| US Billboard Hot 100 | 2 |
| US Adult Contemporary (Billboard) | 12 |
| US Adult Top 40 (Billboard) | 1 |
| US Mainstream Top 40 (Billboard) | 12 |
| US Rhythmic Top 40 (Billboard) | 98 |
| US Triple-A (Billboard) | 48 |

=== Decade-end charts ===
| Chart (1990–1999) | Position |
|---|---|
| US Billboard Hot 100 | 41 |
| Chart (2000–2009) | Position |
| US Billboard Hot 100 | 33 |

=== All-time charts ===
| Chart | Position |
|---|---|
| US Billboard Hot 100 | 3 |

== Certifications ==
| Region | Certification | Certified units/sales |
|---|---|---|
| Australia (ARIA) | 2× Platinum | 140,000^{^} |
| Denmark (IFPI Danmark) | Gold | 45,000^{‡} |
| New Zealand (RMNZ) | 2× Platinum | 60,000^{‡} |
| United Kingdom (BPI) | Platinum | 600,000^{‡} |
| United States (RIAA) (physical) | Platinum | 1,200,000 |
| United States (RIAA) (digital) | Gold | 500,000^{*} |
^{*} Sales figures based on certification alone.^{^} Shipments figures based on certification alone.^{‡} Sales+streaming figures based on certification alone.

== Release history ==
| Region | Date | Format(s) | Label(s) | Ref. |
|---|---|---|---|---|
| United States | June 15, 1999 | Contemporary hit radio | Arista | |
| United States | August 3, 1999 | CD; cassette | Arista | |
| United Kingdom | October 11, 1999 | CD | Arista; BMG | |
| United Kingdom (re-release) | March 20, 2000 | CD; cassette | Arista; BMG | |

== Cover versions ==
- A cover version of the song is included in the 2008 Wii version of Samba de Amigo.
- Post-hardcore group Escape the Fate also recorded a cover version of the song for the compilation album Punk Goes Pop 2, released on March 10, 2009.
- Junior Lima from Brazilian pop duo Sandy & Junior sung a cover version of the song for the duo's live album/DVD As Quatro Estações - O Show, released in 2000.
- The song was featured on two tracks, "Melt Everyone" and "Smooth Flow", from Neil Cicierega's 2014 mash-up album Mouth Sounds, and on two tracks, "Smooth" and "Shit", from the 2017 follow-up album Mouth Moods.
- An acoustic version of the song was released by indie-folk artist Kimberly June on album Covers from Another, recorded at Round Hill Studios in Nashville in 2021.
- The song "Albi Ekhatark (قلبي اختارك)" by Egyptian singer Amr Diab from the 2000 album Tamally Maak is loosely based on "Smooth".

== In popular culture ==
- In February 2013, The Onion published a satirical video joking that "Smooth" had swept the Grammy Awards for 13 years in a row.
- Singer Miley Cyrus, as her television alter ego Hannah Montana from the series of the same name, made reference to "Smooth" and Carlos Santana in her song with Iyaz, "Gonna Get This" from her 2010 album Hannah Montana Forever.
- Funny or Die released a police drama parody trailer with Rob Thomas that recited the song's lyrics.
- In 2019, comedian JP Leonard released a bit inspired by the song which puts Rob Thomas in various jobs. The track, "Man, It's a Hot One", appears on the comedy album NO Show Comedy: A Louisiana Album Recording.
- In 2025, this song was used in season 2 of Sausage Party: Foodtopia, most notably in the third episode of said season.
- In 2026, the song was repeatedly mentioned and quoted in a season 8 episode of the comedy game show Game Changer, in which contestant Zac Oyama receives a punishment forcing him to listen to "Smooth" on repeat (unheard by the audience and other players) while having to act out improv prompts.

== See also ==
- List of Billboard Hot 100 number-one singles of 1999
- List of Billboard Hot 100 number-one singles of 2000
- List of RPM number-one singles of 1999
- List of RPM Rock/Alternative number-one singles (Canada)
