= What It's Like =

1998 single by Everlast

Single by Everlast

from the album Whitey Ford Sings the Blues
- B-side: "7 Years"
- Released: July 1998
- Genre: Blues rock; folk blues; alternative rock; alternative hip hop
- Length: 5:03 (album version); 4:37 (video version); 3:50 (radio edit)
- Label: Tommy Boy
- Songwriter: Everlast
- Producer: Everlast

Everlast singles chronology
"The Rhythm" (1990)	"What It's Like" (1998)	"Painkillers" (1998)

Music video
- "What It's Like" on YouTube

Audio sample
- file; help

"What It's Like" is a song by American musician Everlast. It was released in July 1998 as the lead single from his second studio album, Whitey Ford Sings the Blues (1998). The song is typical of the style Everlast embraced after leaving hip hop trio House of Pain, which combines rock, hip-hop and blues while incorporating characterization and empathy towards impoverished protagonists.

The song peaked at number one on the US Billboard Mainstream Rock Tracks chart for one week and on the Modern Rock Tracks chart for nine weeks. It also reached number 13 on the Billboard Hot 100, becoming the singer's only solo top-40 hit on the US chart. Outside the United States, the song reached number four in Iceland, number six in Canada, and the top 40 in Australia, Austria, Germany, New Zealand, Switzerland, and the United Kingdom.

In September 2023, for the 35th anniversary of the Modern Rock Tracks chart (which by then had been renamed to Alternative Airplay), Billboard published a list of the top 100 most successful songs in the chart's history; "What It's Like" was ranked at number 52.

== Song structure ==
The verses describe three situations of people facing hardship:

- A homeless man outside a liquor store, who begs for change from passers-by but receives only scornful replies.
- A woman whose boyfriend abandons her after she becomes pregnant by him. Deciding to have an abortion, she draws condemnation from protesters outside the clinic.
- The grieving wife and children of a drug dealer who has been shot and killed.

Each verse ends with the narrator's urging that the listeners put themselves in the characters' situation in order to better understand their troubles. During the bridge, he comments on the difficulties he has witnessed in others' lives and experienced in his own, saying, "I've seen the good side of bad and the down side of up and everything in between."

== Music video ==
The music video was directed by Frank Sacramento in Los Angeles. Everlast is shown singing underwater while the three characters depicted in his song drown. Later they are crowded around a window (possibly dead) behind which an idyllic family is enjoying dinner, oblivious to the less fortunate outside.

== Track listings ==
UK CD and cassette single

1. "What It's Like" (radio edit) – 3:49
2. "What It's Like" (original album version) – 5:03

UK 7-inch single

A. "What It's Like" (original album version) – 5:03
B. "7 Years" – 4:04

European and Australian CD single

1. "What It's Like" (radio edit) – 3:49
2. "What It's Like" (original album version) – 5:03
3. "7 Years" – 4:04

== Charts ==
=== Weekly charts ===
Chart (1998–1999)	Peak position
Australia (ARIA)	26
Austria (Ö3 Austria Top 40)	17
Canada Top Singles (RPM)	6
Canada Adult Contemporary (RPM)	33
Canada Rock/Alternative (RPM)	14
Germany (GfK)	17
Iceland (Íslenski Listinn Topp 40)	4
Netherlands (Single Top 100)	58
New Zealand (Recorded Music NZ)	31
Scottish Singles Sales (Official Charts)	33
Switzerland (Schweizer Hitparade)	20
UK Singles (Official Charts)	34
UK Indie (Official Charts)	7
US Billboard Hot 100	13
US Adult Alternative Airplay (Billboard)	13
US Adult Pop Airplay (Billboard)	9
US Alternative Airplay (Billboard)	1
US Mainstream Rock (Billboard)	1
US Pop Airplay (Billboard)	4

=== Year-end charts ===
Chart (1998)	Position
Iceland (Íslenski Listinn Topp 40)	26
US Modern Rock Tracks (Billboard)	89

Chart (1999)	Position
Canada Top Singles (RPM)	29
Germany (Media Control)	81
US Billboard Hot 100	28
US Adult Top 40 (Billboard)	24
US Mainstream Rock Tracks (Billboard)	4
US Mainstream Top 40 (Billboard)	15
US Modern Rock Tracks (Billboard)	2

== Certifications ==
Region	Certification	Certified units/sales
New Zealand (RMNZ)	2× Platinum	60,000^{‡}
^{‡} Sales+streaming figures based on certification alone.

== Release history ==
Region	Date	Format(s)	Label(s)	Ref.
United States	July 1998	Modern rock radio	Tommy Boy	
United States	November 2, 1998	Active rock radio	Tommy Boy	
United States	January 12, 1999	Contemporary hit radio	Tommy Boy	
United Kingdom	February 15, 1999	7-inch vinyl; CD; cassette	Tommy Boy	

== Legacy ==
In April 2015, "What It's Like" was heard playing on the car radio in the dashcam recording during the killing of Walter Scott by Charleston, South Carolina police officer Michael Slager. Everlast said that he was shocked by hearing the song connected to the tragedy and called it "fucked up" and "ironic" considering its lyrical themes of empathy.

In June 2026, CBS News included the song in its list of the 250 essential American songs of the past 250 years.
