= John Gamble (music producer) =

Member of Stimulated Dummies

- Born: October 28, 1960; San Francisco, California, U.S.
- Died: October 16, 2020 (aged 59) New York, New York, U.S.
- Genres: Hip hop; rock
- Occupations: Record producer; audio engineer
- Instruments: Drums, Keyboards, Sampler
- Years active: 1990-2000s
- Labels: Elektra Records; Tommy Boy Records; Stimulated Records

John Gamble (October 28, 1960 – October 16, 2020) was an American music producer and audio engineer, and a member of record production and songwriting team Stimulated Dummies with Geeby Dajani and Dante Ross.

He worked on production, mixing and programming on songs for the likes of 3rd Bass, Brand Nubian, KMD, Leaders of the New School, Grand Puba, Del the Funky Homosapien, Kurious, AZ, Everlast, Santana, Run-DMC, The Getaway People, Korn and Macy Gray.

Mr. Gamble earned platinum discs for his production and engineering work on 8 Mile: Music from and Inspired by the Motion Picture, Everlast's Whitey Ford Sings the Blues and Santana's Supernatural. In addition he won a Grammy Award for Album of the Year at 42nd Annual Grammy Awards for Supernatural.

He died unexpectedly in his sleep on October 16, 2020, in his New York City apartment at Westbeth Artists Community. In 2019, Gamble's production partner Geeby Dajani died from amyotrophic lateral sclerosis in 2019 - leaving Dante Ross as the lone surviving member of the Stimulated Dummies.

== Awards and nominations ==
Year	Nominee / work	Award	Result	Ref.
1999	Supernatural	Grammy Award for Album of the Year	Won	
