= B-Real discography =

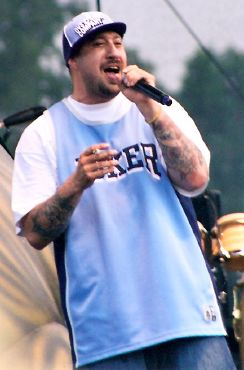
- Studio albums: 5
- EPs: 2
- Mixtapes: 5

The discography of American rapper Louis "B-Real" Freese consists of five studio albums (including one solo album, two collaborative albums with Berner, a collaborative album with Scott Storch and a collaborative album with Psycho Les), two collaborative extended plays with Berner, five mixtapes, a few singles and several guest appearances.

He rose to fame as the frontman of the Cypress Hill group, which as of 2024 has released ten studio albums, seven extended plays (including a joint one with Rusko), six compilations, a live album, singles and rare guest appearances. He joined the duo of Sick Jacken and Big Duke as the third member of Psycho Realm, but after the release of The Psycho Realm in 1997, he left the group to focus on working with Cypress Hill. Together with Xzibit and their common protégé Young De (who later changed his stage name to Demrick), B-Real becomes a member of the supergroup Serial Killers, and, as of 2024, the trio has 4 mixtapes in its discography. From 2016 until their disbandment in 2019, he was a member of the six-piece rap rock supergroup Prophets of Rage, which released one EP and one full-length studio album during its three-year existence.

== Albums ==
=== Studio albums ===
List of studio albums, with selected chart positions
Title	Album details	Peak chart positions							
Title	Album details	US	US R&B	US Rap	US Indie	US Heat.	US Sales	FRA	SWI
Smoke n Mirrors	Released: February 24, 2009; Label: Duck Down Music	148	82	—	20	5	—	142	97
Prohibition Part 3 (with Berner)	Released: November 10, 2016; Label: Bern One Entertainment	—	13	7	17	—	—	—	—
Los Meros (with Berner)	Released: April 17, 2020; Label: Bern One Entertainment	—	—	—	—	—	82	—	—
Tell You Somethin (with Scott Storch)	Released: August 27, 2021; Label: eOne	—	—	—	—	—	—	—	—
Real Psycho (with Psycho Les)	Released: December 6, 2024; Label: B-Real	—	—	—	—	—	—	—	—

== Extended plays ==
List of extended plays, with selected chart positions
Title	EP details	Peak chart positions			
Title	EP details	US R&B	US Rap	US Indie	US Heat.
Prohibition (with Berner)	Released: October 14, 2014; Label: Bern One Entertainment, Taylor Gang Entertainment	28	14	43	6
Prohibition Part 2 (with Berner)	Released: April 17, 2015; Label: Bern One Entertainment	20	16	20	—

== Mixtapes ==
List of mixtapes, with year released
Title	Album details
The Gunslinger	Released: January 11, 2005; Label: 4Real Entertainment, F.I.T.H.
The Gunslinger Part II: Fist Full of Dollars	Released: April 11, 2006; Label: F.I.T.H.
The Gunslinger III: For a Few Dollars More	Released: 2007; Label: Westcoast Madness Records
The Harvest, Vol. 1: The Mixtape	Released: September 28, 2010; Label: RBC Records
The Prescription	Released: 2015; Label: Audio Hustlaz

== Guest appearances ==
List of non-single guest appearances (as a solo artist only, excluding Cypress Hill), with other performing artists, showing year released and album name
Title	Year	Other artist(s)	Album
"Put Your Head Out"	1992	House of Pain	Fine Malt Lyrics
"Ain't Got No Class"	1992	Da Lench Mob	Guerillas in tha Mist
"Wopbabalubop"	1993	Funkdoobiest	Which Doobie U B?
"Hit 'Em High (The Monstars' Anthem)"	1996	Coolio, Method Man, LL Cool J, Busta Rhymes	Space Jam: Music from and Inspired by the Motion Picture
"East Coast/West Coast Killas"	1996	RBX, KRS-One, Nas	Dr. Dre Presents: The Aftermath
"Puppet Master"	1997	DJ Muggs, Dr. Dre	Muggs Presents... The Soul Assassins, Chapter I
"Battle of 2001"	1997	DJ Muggs	Muggs Presents... The Soul Assassins, Chapter I
"Men of Steel"	1997	Shaquille O'Neal, Ice Cube, Peter Gunz, KRS-One	Steel: Music from and Inspired by the Motion Picture
"Tha Way We Run It"	1997	MC Eiht	Last Man Standing
"Lunatics in the Grass"	1998	Sick Jacken	Bulworth: The Soundtrack
"This World Is Something New to Me"	1998	Dawn Robinson, Lisa Loeb, Patti Smith, Lou Rawls, Laurie Anderson, Gordon Gano, Fred Schneider, Kate Pierson, Cindy Wilson, Phife Dawg, Lenny Kravitz, Beck, Jakob Dylan, Iggy Pop	The Rugrats Movie: Music from the Motion Picture
"Splitt (Comin' Out Swingin')"	1999	Reveille	Laced
"Smokefest 1999"	1999	Tash, Phil da Agony, Outkast	Rap Life
"No Retreat"	2000	Dilated Peoples	The Platform
"Guillotine Tactics"	2000	Mellow Man Ace, Profound	From the Darkness into the Light
"Deadly Assassins"	2000	Everlast	Eat at Whitey's
"Xplosion"	2000	Outkast	Stankonia
"Wishful Thinking"	2001	Big Pun	Endangered Species
"Skirrrrrrrt"	2001	Coolio	Coolio.com and El Cool Magnifico
"Back the Fuck Up"	2001	Fear Factory	Digimortal
"Last Laugh"	2001	Chino XL	I Told You So
"Real Wunz"	2001	Jinusean	The Reign
"Peer Pressure"	2001	De La Soul	AOI: Bionix
"911"	2003	Boo-Yaa T.R.I.B.E., Eminem	West Koasta Nostra
"American Psycho II"	2004	D12	D12 World
"Get With It"	2004	The X-Ecutioners	Revolutions
"Bang Out"	2004	The Alchemist	1st Infantry
"Real Life"	2005	GuRu	Version 7.0: The Street Scriptures
"Killafornia"	2005	Transplants	Haunted Cities
"High Rollers"	2005	Proof, Method Man	Searching for Jerry Garcia
"Fandango"	2005	DJ Quik	Trauma
"Roll Up"	2005	Supernatural	S.P.I.T.
"Play That Song"	2005	Tony Touch, Nina Sky	The ReggaeTony Album and La Conexión
"Step Yo Game Up"	2005	Mack 10	Hustla's Handbook
"Black Moon"	2005	Deftones	B-Sides & Rarities
"Get U Down"	2005	Warren G	In the Mid-Nite Hour
"Back Again"	2006	Dilated Peoples	20/20
"Bulletproof Game"	2006	Reyes Bros., J-Killa	Ghetto Therapy
"Deepest Regards"	2006	Defari, J-Ro	Street Music
"Vato"	2006	Snoop Dogg	Tha Blue Carpet Treatment
"The Turnaround"	2007	Soopafly	Bangin Westcoast
"Ridin' High"	2007	Kottonmouth Kings	Cloud Nine
"A to the K"	2008	Akrobatik	Absolute Value
"9mm"	2008	Planet Asia, DJ Muggs	Pain Language
"Pain Gang"	2008	Ill Bill, Everlast	The Hour of Reprisal
"Apocalypse Now"	2008	Eric "Bobo" Correa, Sick Jacken, Ill Bill	Meeting of the Minds
"Cold World"	2008	Ca$his, Young De	Homeland Security
"Intermission"	2009	RZA, Reverend William Burke, Planet Asia	DJ Muggs Presents: Soul Assassins – Intermission
"How Hi Can U Get"	2009	Tash	Control Freek
"I'm an American"	2009	La Coka Nostra	A Brand You Can Trust
"Fuck Tony Montana"	2009	La Coka Nostra, Sick Jacken	A Brand You Can Trust
"Shoot First"	2009	Apathy, Celph Titled	Wanna Snuggle?
"Amputated Saint"	2010	Ill Bill, DJ Muggs	Kill Devil Hills
"Kill Devil Hills"	2010	Heavy Metal Kings, DJ Muggs	Kill Devil Hills
"Crazy"	2011	Slaine, Jaysaun	A World with No Skies
"Go Loco"	2011	Ron Artest	Ball'n
"One by One"	2012	Adil Omar, Sick Jacken, Young De	The Mushroom Cloud Effect
"Latino's Stand Up (RMX)"	2012	Chino XL, Sick Jacken, Thirstin Howl III, Kid Frost, Sinful	Ricanstruction: The Black Rosary
"Killer's Remorse"	2012	Serial Killers, Bishop Lamont	Napalm
"Crazy"	2012	Serial Killers, Jelly Roll	Napalm
"Hit This Freestyle"	2013	Tony Touch	The Piece Maker 3: Return of the 50 MC's
"Fuck Out My Face"	2013	A$AP Ferg, Onyx, Aston Matthews	Trap Lord
"Overdose"	2014	Statik Selektah, JFK	What Goes Around
"Dopamine"	2014	Chris Webby, Talib Kweli, Grafh, Trae tha Truth	Chemically Imbalanced
"Darkness Falls"	2015	Serial Killers, Cali Cleve	Losing Focus
"Caliente"	2015	Chanel West Coast	Waves
"Angels & Demons"	2016	Belly	Another Day in Paradise
"Handshakes With Snakes"	2016	Apathy, Sick Jacken, Mariagrazia	Handshakes with Snakes
"Get Hi"	2016	Danny Brown	Atrocity Exhibition
"My Smoking Song"	2016	JellyRoll, Lil Wyte	No Filter 2
"WarPorn Industry"	2017	Everlast, Sick Jacken, Divine Styler	Warporn
"Last Night"	2017	Berner, Cozmo	Sleepwalkin'
"Bong Song"	2017	Xzibit, Garrick Grout	Grow House (Original Motion Picture Soundtrack)
"Mount Kushmore"	2017	Snoop Dogg, Method Man, Redman	Neva Left
"Turkey Bag"	2017	Berner, Styles P	Vibes
"Rotate"	2017	Berner, Styles P, Cozmo	Vibes
"Pass Me By"	2017	MC Eiht	Which Way Iz West
"Black Cadillac"	2017	Hollywood Undead	V
"Tension"	2017	Meyhem Lauren, DJ Muggs	Gems from the Equinox
"Shakem Up"	2017	Statik Selektah, Everlast	8
"On Blaze"	2018	Paul Wall, Baby Bash	The Legalizers, Vol. 2: Indoor Grow
"What It Sound Like"	2018	Berner	Rico
"Nada"	2018	Berner	11/11
"Touchdown"	2019	Berner, Mozzy, Rexx Life Raj	Slimey Individualz
"Zero Fux"	2019	Kool Keith	Keith
"Russian Roulette"	2019	Berner	El Chivo
"Mind Blowin"	2019	Statik Selektah, Paul Wall	Give Thanks
"Get Money Man"	2020	MC Eiht	Lessons
"Get With This One"	2021	Eric "Bobo" Correa, Stu Bangas	Empires
"Hand Over Fist"	2021	Yelawolf, DJ Muggs	Mile Zero
"Blacks n Mexicans"	2021	Ty Dolla Sign, Schoolboy Q	Gully (Original Motion Picture Soundtrack)
"Dolce and Stiletto"	2021	Baby Bash	PlayaMade Mexicanz III
"Dump on Em"	2023	DJ Muggs, Ice Cube, MC Ren	Soul Assassins 3: Death Valley
"No Bush Weed"	2023	Collie Buddz	Take It Easy
"Dumb Down"	2024	Craig G	The World Is Cooked
"Lots of Green"	2024	Berner, Wiz Khalifa, Devin the Dude	Hoffa
"Let's Get Money Together"	2024	Ice Cube	Man Down
"Higher"	2025	Xzibit, Redman	Kingmaker
"Screws Loose"	2025	Bizarre	HGG5 Basement Jazz
"Tear It Down"	2026	D12, Xzibit	D12 Forever Vol. 1
