= Everlast discography =

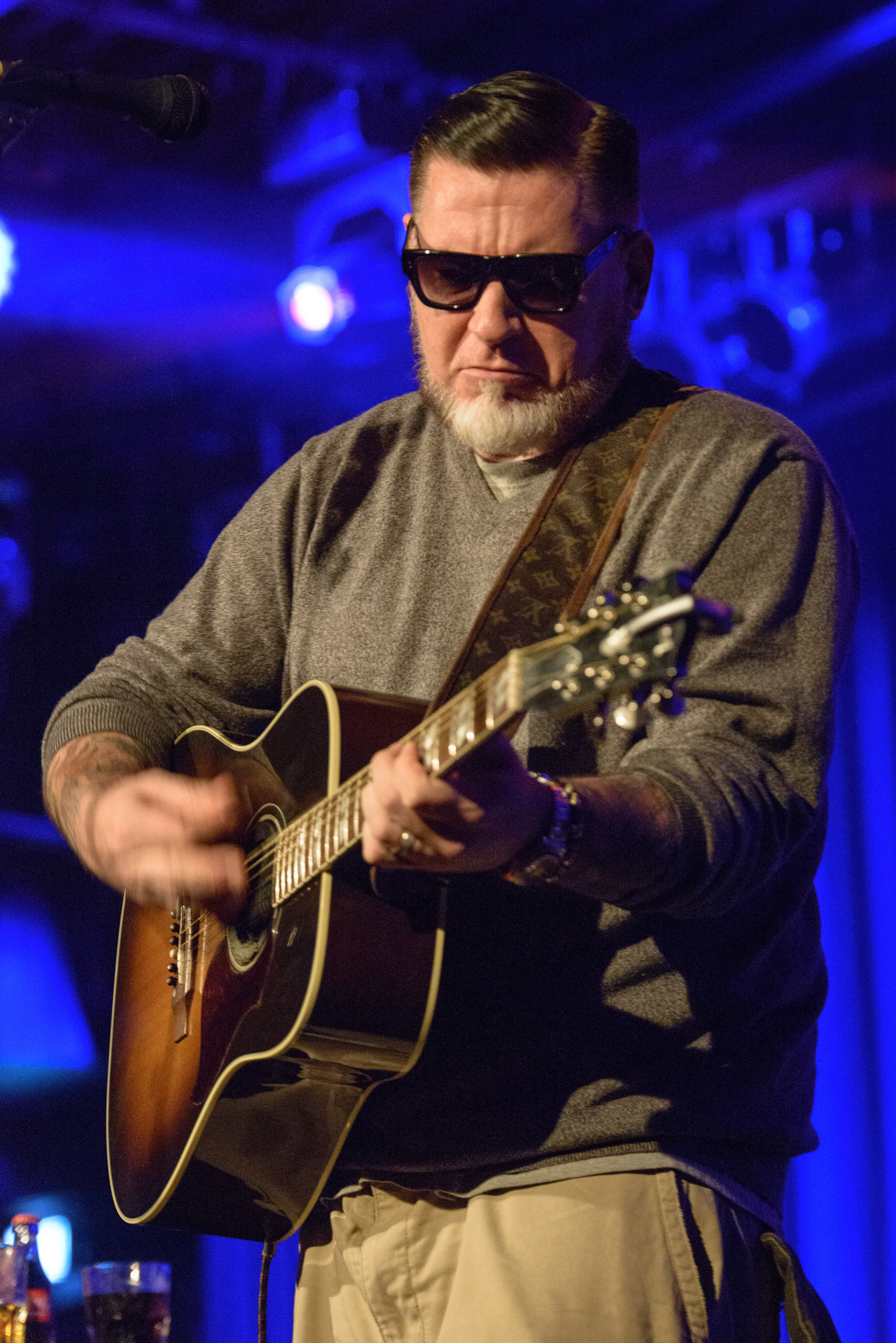
- Everlast in 2015
- Studio albums: 8
- EPs: 1
- Compilation albums: 2
- Mixtapes: 1

This is the discography of American recording artist Everlast.

== Studio albums ==
Year	Album details	Peak chart positions										Certifications
Year	Album details	US	AUT	CAN	FIN	FRA	GER	NLD	SWE	SWI	UK	Certifications
1990	Forever Everlasting: Released: March 27, 1990; Label: Warner Bros.; Formats: CD, CS, LP, DI	—	—	—	—	—	—	—	—	—	—	
1998	Whitey Ford Sings the Blues: Released: September 8, 1998; Label: Tommy Boy; Formats: CD, CS, LP, DI	9	14	8	—	—	12	66	—	20	65	US: 2× Platinum
2000	Eat at Whitey's: Released: October 17, 2000; Label: Tommy Boy; Formats: CD, CS, LP, DI	20	25	20	30	—	11	52	60	25	89	US: Gold
2004	White Trash Beautiful: Released: May 25, 2004; Label: Island Def Jam; Formats: CD, DI	56	32	—	—	124	12	—	—	21	—	
2008	Love, War and the Ghost of Whitey Ford: Released: September 23, 2008; Label: Martyr Inc., Three Ring Projects; Formats: CD, DI	78	—	—	—	132	61	—	—	15	—	
2011	Songs of the Ungrateful Living: Released: October 18, 2011; Label: Martyr Inc., EMI; Formats: CD, DI	48	55	34	—	—	58	—	—	30	—	
2013	The Life Acoustic: Released: August 27, 2013; Label: Martyr Inc., EMI; Formats: CD, DI	102	—	—	—	—	98	—	—	67	—	
2018	Whitey Ford's House of Pain: Released: September 7, 2018; Label: Martyr Inc.; Formats: CD, DI	—	—	—	—	—	77	—	—	18	—	
2026	Embers to Ashes: Released: August 28, 2026; Label: Thirty Tigers / Regime Music Group; Formats: CD, DI	—	—	—	—	—	76	—	—	23	—	
"—" denotes a release that did not chart.

== Singles ==
Year	Song	Peak chart positions										Album
Year	Song	US	US Alt.	US Main.	AUS	AUT	CAN	GER	NLD	SWI	UK	Album
1989	"Never Missin' a Beat"	—	—	—	—	—	—	—	—	—	—	Forever Everlasting
1990	"I Got the Knack"	—	—	—	—	—	—	—	—	—	—	Forever Everlasting
1990	"The Rhythm"	—	—	—	—	—	—	—	—	—	—	Forever Everlasting
1998	"What It's Like"	13	1	1	26	17	6	17	58	20	34	Whitey Ford Sings the Blues
1998	"Painkillers"	—	—	—	—	—	—	—	—	—	—	Whitey Ford Sings the Blues
1998	"Money (Dollar Bill)" (featuring Sadat X)	—	—	—	—	—	—	—	—	—	—	Whitey Ford Sings the Blues
1999	"Ends"^{[A]}	109	7	13	—	—	—	67	—	—	47	Whitey Ford Sings the Blues
1999	"Today (Watch Me Shine)" (featuring Bronx Style Bob)	—	—	—	—	12	—	—	—	—	—	Whitey Ford Sings the Blues
1999	"So Long"	—	—	—	—	—	—	—	—	—	—	End of Days (soundtrack)
2000	"Black Jesus"	—	15	30	80	—	—	—	96	86	37	Eat at Whitey's
2000	"I Can't Move"	—	24	—	—	—	—	99	—	—	107	Eat at Whitey's
2001	"Deadly Assassins" (featuring B-Real)	—	—	—	—	—	—	—	—	—	158	Eat at Whitey's
2003	"White Trash Beautiful"	—	—	—	—	64	—	59	—	42	—	White Trash Beautiful
2004	"Broken"	—	—	—	—	—	—	—	—	—	—	White Trash Beautiful
2008	"Letters Home from the Garden of Stone"	—	—	—	—	—	—	—	—	—	—	Love, War and The Ghost of Whitey Ford
2008	"Folsom Prison Blues"	—	—	—	—	—	—	—	—	—	—	Love, War and The Ghost of Whitey Ford
2008	"Stone in My Hand"	—	—	—	—	—	—	—	—	—	—	Love, War and The Ghost of Whitey Ford
2011	"I Get By"	—	23	—	—	—	—	—	—	—	—	Songs of the Ungrateful Living
2012	"Long Time"	—	—	—	—	—	—	—	—	—	—	Songs of the Ungrateful Living
2018	"The Culling"	—	—	—	—	—	—	—	—	—	—	Whitey Ford's House Of Pain
2018	"Don't Complain"	—	—	—	—	—	—	—	—	—	—	Whitey Ford's House Of Pain
2018	"It Ain't Easy"	—	—	—	—	—	—	—	—	—	—	Whitey Ford's House Of Pain
2026	"Stones"			39								Embers to Ashes
"—" denotes a release that did not chart.

=== As featured artist ===
Year	Song	Peak chart positions								Album
Year	Song	US	US Alt.	US Main.	AUS	BEL (WA)	GER	SWI	UK	Album
1999	"Put Your Lights On"^{[B]} (Santana featuring Everlast)	118	17	8	32	51	87	92	97	Supernatural
2006	"Put Me On" (Swollen Members featuring Everlast and Moka Only)	—	—	—	—	—	—	—	—	Black Magic
2008	"My Medicine" (Snoop Dogg featuring Willie Nelson and Everlast)	—	—	—	—	—	—	—	—	Ego Trippin'
2026	"Blood on the Wheel" _{(Everlast, WLPWR)}									Single
"—" denotes a release that did not chart.

== Other appearances ==
=== Studio appearances ===
- Gravesend (1997) - "Gravesend (Lake of Fire) [with Lordz of Brooklyn]; "Some Nights (Are Better Than Others)"
- Big Daddy (1999) - "Only Love Can Break Your Heart" {cover of Neil Young}
- Black Mask (1999) - "Painkillers" {from Whitey Ford Sings the Blues}
- Black & White (2000) - "Life's a Bitch"
- Soul Assassins II (2000) - "Razor to Your Throat"
- Loud Rocks (2000) - "Shook Ones Part II" {cover of Mobb Deep}
- Stimulated, Vol. 1 (2000) - "Shroomz Pt. II" with Xzibit; "Laugh Now" with B-Real
- Ali (2001) - "The Greatest"
- Saving Grace (2007) - "Saving Grace"

=== Remixes ===
- Rhyme Syndicate - Comin' Through (Various) (1988) - "Syndication"
- Soulbeat 7 (Various) (1990) - "I Got the Knack (Remix)"
- Madonna - "Waiting [Remix]" ["Rain" (maxi-single) {1993)
- KoЯn - "Freak on a Leash [Lethal Freak Mix]" ("Freak on a Leash", ~~1998)~~
- King of the Jungle (2000) - "Love for Real (Remix)" w. N'Dea Davenport
- Dilated Peoples - "Ear Drums Pop [Remix]" (The Platform, ~~2000~~)
- Limp Bizkit - "Faith/Fame Remix" (New Old Songs, ~~2001)~~
- Sick of It All - "Just Look Around [House of Pain Remix]" (Outtakes for the Outcast, ~~2004~~) {recorded in 1993}

=== Selected guest appearances ===
- Ice-T - "What Ya Wanna Do?" (The Iceberg, 1~~989~~)
- Tairrie B - "Vinnie tha' Moocha" (Power of a Woman, ~~1990~~)
- Bronx Style Bob - "Ode II Junior" (Grandma's Ghost, ~~1992~~)
- The Whooliganz - "Hit the Deck" ("Put Your Handz Up", ~~1993~~)
- Nice & Smooth - "Save the Children" (Jewel of the Nile, ~~1994~~)
- Swollen Members - "Bottle Rocket" (Balance, ~~1999)~~
- Prince Paul - "The Bust"; "Men on Blue" (A Prince Among Thieves, ~~1999)~~
- SX-10 - "Rhyme in the Chamber" (Mad Dog American, ~~2000~~)
- Lordz of Brooklyn - "Sucker M.C.s" (Take a Bite Outta Rhyme: A Rock Tribute to Rap, ~~2000)~~
- Run-DMC - "Take the Money and Run" (Crown Royal, ~~2001~~)
- Kurupt - "Kuruption!" (Space Boogie: Smoke Oddessey, ~~2001~~)
- Hesher - "Whose Generation" (Hesher, ~~2001~~)
- The X-Ecutioners - "B-Boy Punk Rock 2001" (Built from Scratch, ~~2002~~)
- DJ Muggs - "Gone for Good" (Dust, ~~2003~~)
- Danny Diablo - "Rise Above" (Street CD Vol. 2, ~~2005~~)
- The S.T.O.P. Movement - "Down Wit Us"; "Dear Mr. President" (Hard Truth Soldiers, Volume 1, ~~2006~~)
- B-Real - "Flash Kharma"; "Family Ties [Remix]" (The Gunslinger Part II: Fist Full of Dollars, ~~2006~~)
- The Lordz - "The Brooklyn Way" (The Brooklyn Way, ~~2006~~)
- Ill Bill - "Only Time Will Tell"; "Pain Gang" (The Hour of Reprisal, ~~2008~~)
- Swollen Members - "Dumb" (Armed to the Teeth, ~~2009~~)
- Danny Diablo - "Sex & Violence" (International Hardcore Superstar, ~~2009~~)
- Cypress Hill - "Take My Pain" (Rise Up, ~~2010~~)
- DJ Muggs - "Skull & Guns" (Kill Devil Hills, ~~2010~~)
- Slaine - "The Last Song" (A World with No Skies, ~~2010~~)
- Big B - "Before I Leave This Place" (Good Times & Bad Advice, ~~2010)~~
- Adil Omar - "Hand Over Your Guns" (The Mushroom Cloud Effect, ~~2013~~)
- Death! Death! Die! - "Smoked Out Clit" ("Big Fucking Mega Boat", ~~2013~~)
- Busta Rhymes - "Calm Down 3.0" (Calm Down: The Clash EP, ~~2014~~)
- Ryu - "Who's Next (Move)" (Tanks for the Memories, 2016)
- Slaine Vs Termanology - "Anti-Hero" (Anti-Hero, ~~2017~~)
- Statik Selektah - "Shake Em Up" (8, ~~2017~~)
- Ras Kass - "The Long Way" (Soul on Ice 2, ~~2019~~)
- Berner & B-Real - "Just Breathe"; "Island Vibes" (Los Meros, ~~2020~~)
- The Felons Club - "Forget You" (Welcome to the Club, ~~2020)~~
- John Forte - "Gas" (Vessels, Angels & Ancestors, ~~2021)~~
- Diamond D - "I'm Not Crazy" (The Diam Piece: Initium, ~~2025)~~

=== Unreleased ===
- Tom Clancy's Ghost Recon Advanced Warfighter (2006) - "All Along the Watchtower" (as Erik Schrody)
