= Serial Killers (musical group) =

American hip hop group

- Origin: U.S.
- Genres: Hip hop
- Years active: 2013–present
- Members: B-Real; Xzibit; Demrick

Serial Killers are an American hip hop supergroup formed in 2013 and composed of rappers B-Real, Xzibit and Demrick. The trio self-released their debut mixtape, Serial Killers Vol. 1, on October 31, 2013. Matt Alonzo directed a music video for their first single, "The First 48".

== Discography ==
=== Albums ===
Title	Album details
Summer of Sam	Released: October 16, 2020; Format: Digital download
This Thing of Ours	Released: April 10, 2026; Format: Digital download

=== Mixtapes ===
Title	Album details
Serial Killers Vol. 1	Released: October 31, 2013; Format: Digital download
The Murder Show	Released: October 30, 2015; Format: Digital download

=== EPs ===
Title	Album details
Day of the Dead	Released: October 31, 2018; Format: Digital download

=== Singles ===
- "First 48" (2013)
- "SK Anthem" (2025)
- "Call The Cops" (2025)
- "This Thing of Ours" (2026)

=== Appearances ===
List of non-single guest appearances, with other performing artists, showing year released and album name
Title	Year	Other artist(s)	Album
"Don't Ya Dare Laugh"	2009	B-Real	Smoke n Mirrors
"Killer's Remorse"	2012	Xzibit, Bishop Lamont	Napalm
"Darkness Falling"	2015	Young De, Cali Cleve, Brevi	Losing Focus
