= Take It Easy (disambiguation) =

"Take It Easy" is a song by the Eagles.

Take It Easy may also refer to:

== Film ==
- Take It Easy (1974 film), a Polish film
- Take It Easy (2015 film), an Indian Hindi-language film

== Music ==
=== Albums ===
- Take It Easy (Collie Buddz album), 2023
- Take It Easy with the Walker Brothers or Take It Easy, by the Walker Brothers, 1965
- Take It Easy, by Billy Hart, 1989
- Take It Easy, by Livin Out Loud, 2015

=== Songs ===
- "Take It Easy" (Crystal Gayle song), 1981
- "Take It Easy" (Mad Lion song), 1994
- "Take It Easy" (Stan Walker song), 2012
- "Take It Easy!", by Buono!, 2009
- "Take It Easy (Love Nothing)", by Bright Eyes, 2004
- "Take It Easy", by 3SL, 2002
- "Take It Easy," by Andy Taylor, 1986
- "Take It Easy", by the Animals, B-side of the single "I'm Crying", 1964
- "Take It Easy", by Devon Welsh from Dream Songs, 2018
- "Take It Easy", by the Fugees, 2005
- "Take It Easy", by Gotthard from Homerun, 2001
- "Take It Easy", by Imagine Dragons from Mercury – Act 2, 2022
- "Take It Easy", by Jetta from Start a Riot, 2014
- "Take It Easy", by Jolin Tsai from Lucky Number, 2001
- "Take It Easy", by Lights from A6, 2024
- "Take It Easy", by Savoy Brown from Looking In, 1970
- "Take It Easy", by Surfer Blood from Astro Coast, 2010
- "Take It Easy", by twlv, 2020
- "Take It Easy", by Vanessa Carlton from Liberman, 2015
- "Take It Easy", written by Xavier Cugat (as Albert De Bru), Irving Taylor, and Vic Mizzy, 1943
- '"Take It Easy", by Hopeton Lewis, one of the earliest Rocksteady hits, 1966
- "Take It Easy," by Jo Jo Gunne from Jo Jo Gunne (album), 1972

== Other uses ==
- Take It Easy (game), an abstract strategy board game
- Take It Easy (TV series), a 1959–1960 Australian variety series

== See also ==
- Take It Easy Baby (disambiguation)
