= Take It Easy Baby =

Take It Easy Baby may refer to:

- "Take It Easy Baby", a song written by Gary Paxton recorded in 1961 by Jeri Lynne Fraser
- "Take It Easy Baby", a song written by Sonny Boy Williamson II on the 1963 recording Sonny Boy Williamson and the Yardbirds
- Take It Easy Baby, a 1976 Taste album (see Rory Gallagher discography)
- Take It Easy, Baby, a 1980 album by Buckwheat Zydeco
- "Take It Easy Baby", a song written by Van Morrison from the 2017 album Versatile

== See also ==
- Take It Easy (disambiguation)
