= Darius Holbert =

American musician

Background information
- Also known as: dariustx
- Born: Darius Holbert; August 5, 1974 (age 52); Dallas, Texas
- Occupations: Musician; composer; record producer; singer-songwriter
- Instruments: Keyboards, vocals, guitar, bass guitar
- Years active: 1987–present
- Website: dariusholbert.com

Darius Holbert (born August 5, 1974, in Dallas, Texas) is a composer of film scores for movies, television and other media, as well as a songwriter, a touring and recording musician. He has composed music for numerous films including the feature documentary "Trophy Kids" (Peter Berg/HBO), Hobo with a Shotgun and Old 37 and contributed original music to Cedar Rapids, Shrink, and World's Greatest Dad, as well as such TV series as American Horror Story, Grey's Anatomy, American Idol and Crash, among others, and an array of commercials, games and short films. "It seems like Holbert can do just about anything in the music world," wrote Movie Maker correspondent Katie Garton.

== Early life ==
Holbert graduated from the Arts Magnet, Booker T. Washington High School for the Performing and Visual Arts in Dallas. Selected for the touring choir of the Texas Boy Choir in 1987, he joined their tour of Australia as a featured soloist and ultimately composed for and conducted an ensemble within the choir. He studied composition and arranging at London's Royal Academy of Music and the University of North Texas.

== Career ==
In 2006, he and John Zacharias Grace (Zach Grace) were the producers as well as the musicians for the album Modern Sounds for the New Era by the band Scientific Lifestyles. (Note: According to Adweek magazine, two years earlier (2004), Zach Grace's Mean Red Music (MRM) Placement had represented television soundtrack composer Dominic Messinger for music placement of his music compositions as television soundtracks and related venues.) In the following year, Holbert and Grace would work together for the second Scientific Lifestyles album, The Arrow (2007).

He has performed and released several albums as a singer-songwriter under the stage name dariustx, and has worked with Dave Brubeck, the Dallas Symphony Orchestra, Britney Spears, Diane Warren, Bobby Brown, Sophie B. Hawkins, Everlast (for whom he co-produced with Fredwreck and played pedal-steel and six-string guitars, banjo, organ, keyboards and other instruments on the album Songs of the Ungrateful Living (2011)) and Wu-Tang Clan, among many other artists, songwriters and musical organizations. He served as music director for hip-hop group House of Pain's 20th anniversary reunion tour (2011). He has been commissioned to write operas, chamber works, and modern dance pieces. His work "When at Last I Leapt into the Jaws" earned him finalist status in a collaboration between Composer's Voice and Movement Research. Darius has studios in Los Angeles and New York City and is a member of ASCAP, SCL, NARAS.

According to a 2022 interview in Voyage LA magazine, Holbert states he is a musician who later switched to film scoring for independent films.

== Awards ==
For the 2018 feature documentary "The Crest" (Mark Covino)

- United International Film Festival - Best Original Music
- Los Angeles Film Awards - Best Score
- The Mod Con - London Film Festival - Official Selection
- Los Angeles CineFest - Semi-Finalist
- London Independent Film Awards - Official Selection
- Barcelona Planet Film Festival - Best Soundtrack
- Film Score Festival - Official Selection

For the 2013 feature documentary "Trophy Kids" (Peter Berg/ HBO):

- International Independent Film Festival: Gold Award, Best Original Film Score

For the 2012 short film Oh, The Places You'll Go!:

- Moondance International Film Festival (New York, NY): Grand Prize, Best Original Film Score
- Park City Film Music Festival: Official Original Score Selection
- Neon Reverb Music In Film Festival: Music In Film, Official Selection
- Action On Film Festival: Official Selection, Film Scores

Other Honors

- Composer's Voice/Movement Research's 2012 "Open" Series (New York, NY): Finalist
