= Kingmaker (Xzibit album) =

Studio album by Xzibit
- Released: May 16, 2025
- Genre: West Coast hip-hop
- Length: 63:55
- Label: Open Bar; Greenback
- Producer: Beat Butcha; Big Duke; Dem Jointz; DJ Battlecat; DJ Khalil; Dr. Dre; Focus...; Koach; David Moss; Problem; Sndtrck; Swizz Beatz; Justin Rhodes; will.i.am

Xzibit chronology
Napalm (2012)	Kingmaker (2025)

Singles from Kingmaker
- 1. "Play This at My Funeral" Released: October 11, 2024; 2. "Been a Long Time Pt. 2" Released: October 25, 2024; 3. "Everywhere I Go" Released: November 27, 2024; 4. "Shut Yo Mouth" Released: February 7, 2025; 5. "For the Love" Released: May 2, 2025; 6. "Leave Me Alone" Released: May 16, 2025; 7. "The Moment" Released: May 16, 2025

Professional ratings
Review scores
Source	Rating
Stanisland Magazine	3/5 stars

Kingmaker is the eighth studio album by American rapper Xzibit, released by Xzibit's Open Bar Entertainment and Conor Mcgregor's Greenback Records on May 16, 2025, being his first solo album in 13 years since Napalm. It contains guest appearances including Dr. Dre, Ice Cube, Ty Dolla Sign, Busta Rhymes, Royce da 5'9", Redman, B-Real, King T, Cold 187um, K.A.A.N., Domo Genesis, Butch Cassidy, Dem Jointz, JasonMartin, Tre Capital, and Guapdad 4000.

== Background and promotion ==
Xzibit had not released an album since Napalm in 2012, until on October 11, 2024, he released the debut single "Play This at My Funeral" and announced his upcoming album. He called "Play This at My Funeral" his "state of the union", and said that the album isn't about his hierarchy, but rather ups and down throughout his career that "made him successful." He announced that Kingmaker would release in early 2025. The month before the single released, he signed with Greenback Records, a new record label launched by controversial Irish professional mixed martial artist and former UFC fighter Conor McGregor.

On October 25, 2024, Xzibit released the second single "Been a Long Time Pt. 2," a sequel to "Been a Long Time" from his third studio album Restless. He would drop a third single, "Everywhere I Go," produced by Dem Jointz, on November 27, 2024. He further continued in 2025 with the fourth single "Shut Yo Mouth" and fifth single "For the Love," the latter being Xzibit's first collaboration with Ice Cube.

== Track listing ==
Kingmaker track listing
No.	Title	Writer(s)	Producer	Length
1.	"Play This at My Funeral"	Xzibit	Koach	4:12
2.	"Everywhere I Go" (featuring Dem Jointz)	Xzibit; Dem Jointz	Dem Jointz	2:48
3.	"Been a Long Time Pt. 2" (featuring Jenn Em)	Xzibit; Dem Jointz	Dem Jointz	3:12
4.	"The Moment" (featuring Busta Rhymes and JasonMartin)	Xzibit; Busta Rhymes; JasonMartin	Focus...; Problem; Xzibit	3:07
5.	"Earth Is Over"	Xzibit	Big Duke	2:41
6.	"Leave Me Alone" (featuring Dr. Dre and Ty Dolla Sign)	Xzibit; Ty Dolla Sign	Dr. Dre; Swizz Beatz	3:30
7.	"Belly of the Beast" (featuring JasonMartin)	Xzibit; Martin	David Moss	4:05
8.	"History"	Xzibit	Justin Rhodes	2:56
9.	"Genesis"	Xzibit	Koach	2:52
10.	"Perfect Alibi" (featuring Stalone)	Xzibit	Dem Jointz	3:12
11.	"American Idols" (featuring Symba)	Xzibit; Symba	Sndtrck	3:07
12.	"Crash" (featuring Royce da 5'9" and K.A.A.N.)	Xzibit; Royce da 5'9"; K.A.A.N.	Big Duke	3:11
13.	"For the Love" (featuring Ice Cube and Lorine Cha)	Xzibit; Ice Cube	Big Duke	3:32
14.	"Shut Yo Mouth" (featuring Compton AV and Butch Cassidy)	Xzibit; Compton AV; Butch Cassidy	DJ Battlecat	2:55
15.	"Higher" (featuring Redman and B-Real)	Xzibit; Redman; B-Real	Focus...	2:43
16.	"Success"	Xzibit; will.i.am	will.i.am	3:00
17.	"Notified" (featuring King Tee and Cold 187um)	Xzibit; King Tee; Cold 187um	Beat Butcha	3:02
18.	"What U Like" (featuring Guapdad 4000 and Daygo Fatts)	Xzibit; Guapdad 4000; Daygo Fatts	DJ Khalil	3:14
19.	"End of the Day" (featuring Tre Capital, Domo Genesis, and Adé Békoé)	Xzibit; Tre Capital; Domo Genesis; Adé Békoé	Big Duke	2:51
20.	"Kingmaker"	Xzibit	Sndtrck	2:46
Total length:				63:55

== Charts ==
Chart (2025)	Peak position
UK Album Downloads (OCC)	47
