= White Trash Beautiful =

Studio album by Everlast
- Released: May 25, 2004
- Recorded: 2003
- Studio: Ameraycan Studios, North Hollywood, California; MGS Sound Lab, Burbank, California; Studio 57, New York City; Skyline Studios, New York City
- Genre: Hip-hop; blues
- Length: 58:17
- Label: Island
- Producer: Everlast (also exec.); Dante Ross (also exec.); Rob Hill; Emile

Everlast chronology
Eat at Whitey's (2000)	White Trash Beautiful (2004)	Love, War and the Ghost of Whitey Ford (2008)

Professional ratings
Review scores
Source	Rating
AllMusic	3/5 stars
Blender	1/5 stars
Encyclopedia of Popular Music	3/5 stars
Rolling Stone	2/5 stars

White Trash Beautiful is the fourth solo studio album by American recording artist Everlast. It was released internationally on May 25, 2004, and a day later in the United States via Island Records. It has sold about 124,000 copies in the U.S.

The record peaked at number 12 on German music charts, at number 21 on the Swiss music charts, at number 32 on Ö3 Austria Top 40, at number 56 on the US Billboard 200, and at number 124 on French music charts. The lead single of the album, "White Trash Beautiful", was released in March 2004 and also charted but only in three major European charts: number 42 in Switzerland, number 59 in Germany, and number 64 in Austria. The official music video features American actor Aaron Paul.

== Music and lyrics ==
White Trash Beautiful primarily mixes hip-hop tropes with arrangements built on bluesy strumming. Musically, Everlast and producer Dante Ross marry his gruff delivery with spare acoustic guitar layered in subdued hip-hop rhythms. The album features hip-hop references, including lyrical quotes, turntable scratches and explicit lines and bravado.

The album mainly blends country and blues into lyrical narratives of loneliness. Everlast uses a haggard voice for singing grim songs. He occasionally engages in rap clichés, with verses expressing street bravado and cynicism in addition to relationship issues and heartbreak.

== Track listing ==
No.	Title	Writer(s)	Producer(s)	Length
1.	"Blinded by the Sun" (featuring Sheree Brown)	E. Schrody; D. McDaniels; E. Barrier; J. Simmons; L. Smith; W. Griffin	Everlast; Dante Ross (co.); Rob Hill (co.)	4:08
2.	"Broken"	E. Schrody	Everlast; Dante Ross (co.); Rob Hill (co.)	4:23
3.	"White Trash Beautiful"	E. Schrody	Everlast; Dante Ross; Rob Hill	4:01
4.	"Sleepin' Alone"	E. Schrody	Dante Ross; Everlast (co.)	4:07
5.	"The Warning"	E. Schrody; D. Ross	Dante Ross; Everlast (co.)	3:07
6.	"Angel"	E. Schrody	Everlast; Rob Hill; Dante Ross (co.)	4:40
7.	"This Kind of Lonely"	E. Schrody; H. Williams	Everlast; Dante Ross (co.); Rob Hill (co.)	3:32
8.	"Soul Music"	E. Schrody; D. Robey; E. Haynie; G. Caple; J. Scott	Emile	3:12
9.	"God Wanna"	E. Schrody; C. Bobbit; J. Brown	Dante Ross; Everlast (co.)	4:26
10.	"Lonely Road"	E. Schrody	Everlast; Dante Ross (co.); Rob Hill (co.)	3:18
11.	"Sad Girl"	E. Schrody; P. Mayfield; R. Charles	Dante Ross; Everlast (co.)	4:10
12.	"Ticking Away"	E. Schrody; D. Ross; E. Randle; L. Seymour; W. Mitchell	Dante Ross	3:44
13.	"Pain"	E. Schrody	Dante Ross; Everlast (co.)	4:38
14.	"2 Pieces of Drama"	E. Schrody; B. Williams; B. Bouldin; E. Edwards; E. Dixon; L. Muggerud; L. Freeze	Everlast; Dante Ross (co.); Rob Hill (co.)	3:47
15.	"Maybe"	E. Schrody	Dante Ross; Everlast (co.)	3:14
Total length:				58:17

== Personnel ==
Vocalists

- Erik Francis Schrody - vocals
- Jeni Fujita - backing vocals (tracks: 4–5, 9, 11)
- Carlos Rigas - backing vocals (tracks: 3, 6, 10)
- Sheree Brown - backing vocals (track 1)
- Derek Murphy - backing vocals (track 5)
- Louis Freese - backing vocals (track 14)

Instrumentalists

- Justin Premino - bass (tracks: 4–5, 9, 13, 15)
- Dorian Heartsong - bass (tracks: 1–2, 6, 10)
- Chris Thomas - bass (tracks: 3, 7, 11)
- Tobias Ralph - drums (tracks: 4, 9)
- Johnathan Moouer - drums (tracks: 6, 13)
- Joshua Lopez - guitar (tracks: 3, 7)
- Rob Hill - guitar (track 6)
- John Vercessi - keyboards (tracks: 4–5, 9, 11, 13, 15)
- Keefus Ciancia - keyboards (tracks: 1, 3, 14)
- Zac Rae - keyboards (tracks: 1–3, 6–7)
- Dante Ross - keyboards (track 12)
- Al Pahanish - percussion (track: 6, 10)
- Miles Tackett - cello (track 2)
- Angelo Moore - theremin (track 2)
- Alma Cielo - violin (track 10)

Technicals

- Erik Francis Schrody - producer (tracks: 1–3, 6–7, 10, 14), co-producer (tracks: 4–5, 9, 11, 13, 15), executive producer
- Dante Ross - producer (tracks: 3–5, 9, 11–13, 15), co-producer (tracks: 1–2, 6–7, 10, 14), executive producer, recording (tracks: 4–5, 9, 11–13, 15)
- Rob Hill - producer (tracks: 3, 6), co-producer (tracks: 1–2, 7, 10, 14), recording (tracks: 1–3, 6–7, 14)
- Emile Haynie - producer (track 8)
- John Gamble - recording (tracks: 4–5, 9, 11–13, 15)
- Brian Gardner - mastering
- Robert Power - mixing
- Ari Raskin - assistant engineer
- David Campbell - string arrangement (tracks: 7, 15)

== Charts ==
Chart (2004)	Peak position
Austrian Albums (Ö3 Austria)	32
German Albums (Offizielle Top 100)	12
Swiss Albums (Schweizer Hitparade)	21
US Billboard 200	56
