= The Gunslinger Part II: Fist Full of Dollars =

Mixtape by B-Real
- Released: April 11, 2006
- Genre: Hip hop
- Length: 1:03:20
- Label: F.I.T.H; FITH 1002
- Producer: B-Real; Fredwreck

B-Real chronology
The Gunslinger (2005)	The Gunslinger Part II: Fist Full of Dollars (2006)	The Gunslinger Part III: For a Few Dollars More (2007)

The Gunslinger Part II: Fist Full Of Dollars is the second mixtape album by American rapper and record producer B-Real. It was released on April 11, 2006, serving as a sequel to his 2005's The Gunslinger. The mixtape features guest appearances from Willie Malo, Son Doobie, Everlast, O Brown, Trace Midas, Alchemist, Chace Infinite, Crow, Defari, Krondon, Outthere, Proof, Sen Dog, Sick Jacken, XL and Xzibit.

It also served as a prequel to B-Real's third and final mixtape in his 'The Gunslinger' series, The Gunslinger Part III: For a Few Dollars More, which was released in 2007. The subtitle to the album refers to Sergio Leone's 1964 film A Fistful of Dollars.

== Track listing ==
No.	Title	Length
1.	Untitled	0:59
2.	"Fist Full of Dollars"	2:59
3.	"Body Somethin" (featuring Alchemist)	2:37
4.	"The Take Over" (featuring O Brown and Willie Malo)	3:41
5.	"The Hustle" (featuring Trace Midas)	2:48
6.	"Drop That Shit" (featuring Willie Malo and Son Doobie)	2:22
7.	"Incredible"	1:39
8.	"Listen to Me" (featuring Willie Malo and Son Doobie)	3:10
9.	"Put on Your Vest" (featuring Defari)	4:26
10.	"Breathe" (featuring Crow)	3:24
11.	"L.A. Bangers"	2:37
12.	"Teflon Killas" (featuring Willie Malo and Son Doobie)	4:22
13.	"The Set Up" (featuring Willie Malo and O Brown)	4:29
14.	"Lay U Flat" (featuring Proof)	3:22
15.	"U Can't Win" (featuring Outthere)	3:30
16.	"Phoenix"	0:59
17.	"Flash Karma" (featuring Everlast and Chace Infinite)	4:41
18.	"Family Ties (Remix)" (featuring Son Doobie, XL, Sen Dog, Sick Jacken, Willie Malo and Everlast)	5:38
19.	"Saturday Night (Remix)" (featuring Xzibit, Krondon and Trace Midas)	5:37
Total length:		1:03:20

Notes

- Tracks 1 and 19 are unlisted and untitled.
