= Whitey Ford's House of Pain =

Studio album by Everlast
- Released: September 7, 2018
- Length: 44:36
- Label: Martyr Inc.
- Producer: Everlast (also exec.); Divine Styler; Bryan Velasco; Evidence

Everlast chronology
| The Life Acoustic (2013) | Whitey Ford's House of Pain (2018) |

Whitey Ford's House of Pain is the eighth solo studio album by American recording artist Everlast. It was released on September 7, 2018, via Martyr Inc. Records, and is Everlast's first album in four years and first of original material in seven years. Production was handled by Divine Styler, Bryan Velasco, Everlast, Evidence, RichGains, DJ Skizz, and the Alchemist. It features contributions from Maiya Sykes on backing vocals, Corey Cofield on bass, Philip Fisher of Fishbone on drums, and Artyom Manukyan on cello, with guest appearances by fellow rappers Aloe Blacc of Emanon, Slug of Atmosphere, and beatboxer Rahzel.

The album debuted at number 21 on the Billboard Americana/Folk Albums chart and at number 15 on the Independent Albums chart in the United States, at number 77 on the German albums chart and at number 18 on the Swiss albums chart.

== Background ==
In an August 2018 interview with Stereogum, Everlast stated, regarding referencing his former group House of Pain in the album title, "I don’t plan them out too much. Especially album titles, they just kind of happen. That one is again trying to figure out what the record was, it’s just kind of like to me it just represents everything I’ve ever done." Later in the interview, when asked about House of Pain last touring in 2017, he stated "We brought it back a couple times for fun and it's just... it's just done. I can't do it anymore [...] We’ve only gotten together twice in the last 15 years and that was for the 20th anniversary and then for the 25th anniversary. And I don’t think I’m doing it for the 30th anniversary. I’m done." He also explained: "Another reason I called the album [Whitey Ford's House Of Pain] is because it's kind of a way [to] say, 'this is all that's left'".

== Track listing ==
All tracks produced by Everlast, Divine Styler, and Bryan Velasco, unless otherwise noted.

| No. | Title | Producer(s) | Length |
|---|---|---|---|
| 1. | "One of Us" | Everlast; Divine Styler; Bryan Velasco; Blended Babies (add.) | 3:36 |
| 2. | "The Culling" | Evidence | 3:14 |
| 3. | "It Ain't Easy" | | 3:17 |
| 4. | "The Climb" (Interlude) | | 0:45 |
| 5. | "The Climb" | | 4:22 |
| 6. | "Slow Your Roll" (featuring Aloe Blacc) | Evidence | 3:24 |
| 7. | "Smokin & Drinkin" | | 3:40 |
| 8. | "Oooohh (I Don't Need You)" (featuring Slug) | | 3:30 |
| 9. | "Summer Rain" (Interlude) | | 1:01 |
| 10. | "Summer Rain" | | 3:16 |
| 11. | "Don't Complain" | Everlast; Divine Styler; Bryan Velasco; Evidence (co.) | 3:35 |
| 12. | "Break It Down" | | 3:31 |
| 13. | "Break It Down" (Interlude) | | 0:47 |
| 14. | "HeartBeat" | | 3:30 |
| 15. | "Dream State" | Everlast; Divine Styler; Bryan Velasco; Alchemist (co.) | 3:08 |

== Charts ==
| Chart (2018) | Peak position |
|---|---|
| German Albums (Offizielle Top 100) | 77 |
| Swiss Albums (Schweizer Hitparade) | 18 |
| US Americana/Folk Albums (Billboard) | 21 |
| US Digital Albums (Billboard) | 25 |
| US Independent Albums (Billboard) | 15 |
