= Napalm (album) =

Studio album by Xzibit
- Released: October 9, 2012
- Recorded: 2010–12
- Genres: West Coast hip-hop; gangsta rap
- Length: 69:05 (normal edition); 84:07 (deluxe edition)
- Labels: Open Bar; EMI
- Producers: 1500 or Nothin'; 21 The Producer; Akon; Beat Butcha; David Banner; DJ Chill; Dr. Dre; E. Dan; Focus...; Illmind; Insane Wayne; M-Phazes; Rick Rock; Risingson; Symbolyc One; Saukrates

Xzibit chronology
Full Circle (2006)	Napalm (2012)	Kingmaker (2025)

Singles from Napalm
- 1. "Phenom" Released: May 25, 2010; 2. "Up Out the Way" Released: September 4, 2012

Napalm is the seventh studio album by American rapper Xzibit. It was released on October 9, 2012 through Open Bar Entertainment and EMI, making it his first album since 2006's Full Circle. It features guest appearances from Demrick, Slim the Mobster, The Game, Wiz Khalifa, Bishop Lamont, B-Real, Brevi, Crooked I, David Banner, E-40, King T, Prodigy, RBX, Tha Alkaholiks and Trena Joiner.

The album debuted at number 150 on the Billboard 200 with first-week sales of 3,200 copies in the United States.

== Background ==
After the commercial failure of his last studio album Full Circle in 2006, Xzibit was released from his contract with Koch Records and mainly focused on his acting career. No new material for a new studio album surfaced until 2009, when he released the song "Hurt Locker", followed by "Phenom" in early 2010 for his new studio album, then titled MMX (2010 in Roman numerals). But since none of the singles made a commercial impact, the album was not released that year, prompting him to change the name to MMXI. The album was renamed Restless 2 in late 2011 and again renamed to its current title after the success of his collaboration "Napalm" with Travis Barker for his mixtape Let the Drummer Get Wicked.

== Singles ==
The album's single "Phenom" was released on May 25, 2010 on iTunes, produced by Risingson and features vocals from rapper Kurupt with whom Xzibit had already worked on previous albums, and G-Unit rapper 40 Glocc. The album's lead single "Up Out the Way" was released on September 4, 2012, featuring fellow West Coast rapper E-40 and was produced by Rick Rock.

== Critical reception ==
Professional ratings
Aggregate scores
Source	Rating
Metacritic	66/100
Review scores
Source	Rating
AllMusic	3.5/5 stars
Drowned in Sound	2/10
HipHopDX	3.5/5
Laut.de	4/5 stars
RapReviews	7.5/10
Slant	3.5/5 stars
XXL	L (3/5)

Napalm was met with generally favorable reviews from music critics. At Metacritic, which assigns a normalized rating out of 100 to reviews from mainstream publications, the album received an average score of 66 based on six reviews.

Matt Jost of RapReviews found the album "remarkably focused, not forsaking the established Xzibit sound but neither rehashing it". HipHopDX writer said: "Napalm finds X fluctuating between trying to recapture the sound he perfected when he was cavorting with the Aftermath staff, and exploring elder statesmanship a la "Thank You" from 2006's Full Circle. When he goes too far in pursuit of either extreme, Napalm falters". AllMusic's Fred Thomas wrote: "What's delivered is another robust collection of business as usual, with the surprising diversions adding just enough dimension to the album to even it out". Ted Scheinman of Slant Magazine said: "Napalm comes on in old-school fashion, with beats as mere vehicles for lyrics, and lyrics that work on a reassuring number of levels".

In a mixed review, Christopher Minaya of XXL called the work "a well-rounded LP full of illustrative and cohesive tracks, while surviving a few average hooks, such as on 'Gangsta Gangsta'". In a negative review, Richard Wink of Drowned in Sound stated: "Napalm is a long ass 18 track slog, and the pointless thug boasts scattered throughout the album".

== Track listing ==
No.	Title	Producer(s)	Length
1.	"State of Hip-Hop vs. Xzibit"	Beat Butcha	3:54
2.	"Everything"	Rick Rock	4:07
3.	"Dos Equis" (featuring The Game and RBX)	Rick Rock	4:05
4.	"Something More" (featuring Prodigy)	Saukrates	3:42
5.	"Gangsta Gangsta"	DJ Chill	4:16
6.	"Forever a G" (featuring Wiz Khalifa)	E. Dan	3:58
7.	"1983" (featuring Trena Joiner)	Insane Wayne	3:47
8.	"Stand Tall" (featuring Slim the Mobster)	Symbolyc One; M-Phazes	4:24
9.	"Spread It Out"	21 The Producer	3:38
10.	"Up Out the Way" (featuring E-40)	Rick Rock	4:23
11.	"Napalm"	1500 or Nothin'	4:15
12.	"Meaning of Life" (featuring Shilo Harris)	Symbolyc One	5:00
13.	"Louis XIII" (featuring King Tee and Tha Alkaholiks)	Dr. Dre	2:43
14.	"Enjoy the Night" (featuring David Banner, Wiz Khalifa and Brevi)	David Banner	3:46
15.	"Movies" (featuring The Game, Crooked I, Slim the Mobster and Demrick)	Akon	5:10
16.	"I Came to Kill" (featuring RBX)	Illmind	3:38
17.	"Killer's Remorse" (featuring B-Real, Demrick and Bishop Lamont)	Focus...	4:19
Total length:			69:05

Bonus track
No.	Title	Producer(s)	Length
18.	"1983 Remix" (featuring Trena Joiner)	Insane Wayne	3:47
Total length:			72:52

iTunes deluxe edition
No.	Title	Producer(s)	Length
19.	"Throw It Like It's Free" (featuring Black Milk, Phats and Tre Capital)	1500 or Nothin'	3:16
20.	"Crazy" (featuring B-Real, Demrick and Jelly Roll)	Jelly Roll	4:33
21.	"Phenom" (featuring 40 Glocc and Kurupt)	Risingson	3:26
Total length:			84:07

== Personnel ==
- 1500 or Nothin' – producers (tracks: 11, 19)
- Albert Johnson – featured artist (track 4)
- Aliaune Thiam – producer (track 15)
- Alvin Joiner – primary artist, executive producer
- Andre Young – producer (track 13)
- Anthony Johnson – featured artist (tracks: 8, 15)
- Bernard Edwards Jr. – producer (track 17)
- Cameron Thomaz – featured artist (tracks: 6, 14)
- Dan Gerbarg – mastering
- David L. Drew – featured artist & producer (track 20)
- Demerick Ferm – featured artist (tracks: 15, 17, 20)
- DJ Chill – producer (track 5)
- Dominick Wickliffe – featured artist (track 15)
- Eart Stevens – featured artist (track 10)
- Eliot Dubock – producer (track 1)
- Eric Allan Dan – producer (track 6)
- Eric Dwayne Collins – featured artist (track 3)
- Eric Weaver – assistant mixing
- Ferrell Wayne Miles – producer (tracks: 7, 18)
- Howie Weinberg – mastering
- Jay Turner – engineering
- Jayceon Taylor – featured artist (tracks: 3, 15)
- Karl Amani Wailoo – producer (track 4)
- Kory B. Garnett – featured artist (track 14)
- Larry Griffin Jr. – producer (tracks: 8, 12)
- Lavell Crump – featured artist & producer (track 14)
- Louis Freese – featured artist (tracks: 17, 20)
- Mark Thomas Landon III – producer (track 8)
- Matt Alonzo – photography
- Peter Mokran – mixing
- Philip Martin – featured artist (track 17)
- Ramon Ibanga Jr. – producer (track 16)
- Ricardo Thomas – producer (tracks: 2, 3, 10)
- Roger McBride – featured artist (track 13)
- Ronald Fair – strings arrangement (tracks: 7, 18)
- Ret. Staff Sgt. Shilo Harris – featured artist (track 12)
- Tha Alkaholiks – featured artists (track 13)
- Thomas Jamal McCray Jr. – producer (track 9)
- Trena Joiner – featured artist (tracks: 7, 18)

== Charts ==
Chart (2012)	Peak position
US Billboard 200	150
US Top R&B/Hip-Hop Albums (Billboard)	21
US Top Rap Albums (Billboard)	17

== Release history ==
Region	Date	Format(s)	Label
Germany	October 5, 2012	CD, digital download	Open Bar Entertainment, EMI
Italy	October 5, 2012	CD, digital download	Open Bar Entertainment, EMI
United States	October 9, 2012	CD, digital download	Open Bar Entertainment, EMI
