= The Life Acoustic (Everlast album) =

Studio album by Everlast
- Released: August 27, 2013
- Studio: Martyr Inc Studios
- Genre: Blues
- Length: 45:05
- Label: Martyr Inc Records; EMI
- Producer: Everlast (also exec.)

Everlast chronology
Songs of the Ungrateful Living (2011)	The Life Acoustic (2013)	Whitey Ford's House of Pain (2018)

Professional ratings
Review scores
Source	Rating
AllMusic	3/5 stars
PopMatters	5/10
Spectrum Culture	2.75/5

The Life Acoustic is an album by American musician Everlast, composed of re-recordings of his previous songs performed on acoustic guitar. It was released on August 27, 2013 via Martyr Inc Records/EMI. Recording sessions took place at Martyr Inc Studios. Production was handled by Evelast himself with co-producer Joe Reiver, additional producer Bryan Velasco and co-executive producers Ivory Daniel and Kevin Zinger. The album peaked at number 102 on the US Billboard 200, number 67 on the Swiss Hitparade and number 98 on the GfK Entertainment charts.

== Track listing ==
No.	Title	Length
1.	"Sad Girl"	4:34
2.	"Black Jesus"	3:48
3.	"Today"	4:56
4.	"Broken"	4:47
5.	"Stone in My Hand"	3:37
6.	"Weakness"	3:51
7.	"Children's Story"	3:08
8.	"Stay"	4:31
9.	"My Medicine"	2:44
10.	"Lonely Road"	3:44
11.	"Grandma's Hand"	1:59
12.	"Jump Around?"	3:26
Total length:		45:05

== Personnel ==
- Erik "Everlast" Schrody — vocals, guitar, producer, executive producer
- Derek Brassel — additional guitar
- Bryan Velasco — keyboards and additional producer (track 12)
- Joe Reiver — co-producer, recording, mixing
- Ivory Daniel — co-executive producer, management
- Kevin Zinger — co-executive producer, management
- Gavin Lurssen — mastering
- Reuben Cohen — mastering
- Tristan Eaton — artwork
- Alex Rauch — layout

== Charts ==
Chart (2013)	Peak position
German Albums (Offizielle Top 100)	98
Swiss Albums (Schweizer Hitparade)	67
US Billboard 200	102
US Top Rock Albums (Billboard)	29
US Independent Albums (Billboard)	19
