= Love, War and the Ghost of Whitey Ford =

Studio album by Everlast
- Released: September 23, 2008
- Recorded: 2007–2008
- Genre: Alternative rock; blues
- Length: 62:36
- Label: Martyr Inc.; Sony ATV
- Producer: Everlast; Keefus Ciancia; DJ Lethal; DJ Muggs

Everlast chronology
White Trash Beautiful (2004)	Love, War and the Ghost of Whitey Ford (2008)	Songs of the Ungrateful Living (2011)

Professional ratings
Aggregate scores
Source	Rating
Metacritic	64/100
Review scores
Source	Rating
AllMusic	3.5/5 stars
Beats Per Millennium	(2.5/10)
Okayplayer	(77/100)

Love, War and the Ghost of Whitey Ford is the fifth solo studio album by American recording artist Everlast. It was released on September 23, 2008 via his own record label Martyr Inc, with distribution by Hickory Records/Sony/ATV Music Publishing. This album sees Everlast moving away from hip-hop in favor of alternative rock and blues. The album peaked at number 15 on the Swiss music charts, number 61 in Germany, number 78 on the U.S. Billboard 200, and number 132 in France.

The record included singles and videos for "Letter Home from the Garden of Stone", which was available for free download via martyr-inc.com in December 2007, a DJ Muggs-produced cover track of Johnny Cash's "Folsom Prison Blues", which was released to download on August 19, and the final "Stone in My Hand", which debuted on the martyr-inc.com website on October 28, 2008 and later made its appearance in 2011 film Drive Angry. All the tracks from the album were written and produced by Keefus Ciancia and Everlast himself, except for "Naked" produced by DJ Lethal, and "Folsom Prison Blues".

== Track listing ==
All tracks are written by Erik Schrody, except where noted. All tracks are produced by Keefus Ciancia and Everlast, except where noted.

No.	Title	Writer(s)	Producer(s)	Length
1.	"Kill the Emperor"	Schrody; Ciancia		3:24
2.	"Folsom Prison Blues"	John R. Cash	Ciancia; Everlast; Muggs	3:27
3.	"Stone in My Hand"			3:32
4.	"Anyone"			4:12
5.	"Die in Yer' Arms"	Schrody; Ciancia		3:40
6.	"Friend"			3:23
7.	"Everyone"			5:38
8.	"Naked"	Schrody; Ciancia; Leor Dimant	Ciancia; Everlast; DJ Lethal	4:04
9.	"Stay"			4:58
10.	"Letters Home from the Garden of Stone"	Schrody; Ciancia		4:07
11.	"Tuesday Mornin'"	Schrody; Ciancia		3:59
12.	"Throw a Stone"			0:29
13.	"Weakness"			5:06
14.	"Dirty"			3:53
15.	"The Ocean"	Schrody; Ciancia		3:44
16.	"Let It Go"			4:30
17.	"Saving Grace" (bonus track)			3:06
18.	"My Medicine" (demo; bonus track)			3:11
19.	"Maybe" (bonus track)			3:13
Total length:				62:36

Notes

- Tracks 18 and 19 are from the European releases only.
- "Folsom Prison Blues" is a cover song of "Folsom Prison Blues" as written and performed by Johnny Cash from 1957 album With His Hot and Blue Guitar
- "My Medicine (Demo)" is a songwriter's cover song of "My Medicine" as co-written by Calvin Broadus and originally performed by Snoop Dogg from 2008 album Ego Trippin'
- "Maybe" is from the 2004 release White Trash Beautiful

Samples

- "Folsom Prison Blues" contains elements of "Insane in the Brain" by Cypress Hill (1993) and "Here We Go (Live at the Funhouse)" by Run-DMC (1985)
- "Die in Yer' Arms" contains elements of "Goin' Out West" by Tom Waits (1992)

== Personnel ==
- Erik Francis Schrody – vocals, guitar, piano, turntables, programming, producer
- Keith Ciancia – bass, drums, keyboards, piano, programming, engineer, producer
- Leor DiMant – producer (track 8)
- Lawrence Muggerud – producer (track 2)
- Brian Gardner – mastering
- Shawn Everett – mixing
- Daniel O'Connor – artwork
- Geoff Gallegos – conductor

== Charts ==
Chart (2008)	Peak position
German Albums (Offizielle Top 100)	61
Swiss Albums (Schweizer Hitparade)	15
US Billboard 200	78
US Top Alternative Albums (Billboard)	22
US Independent Albums (Billboard)	9
