= Songs of the Ungrateful Living =

Studio album by Everlast
- Released: October 18, 2011
- Recorded: 2010–2011
- Studios: Martyr Inc Studios (Los Angeles, California)
- Length: 51:06
- Label: Martyr Inc.
- Producers: Ivory Daniel (exec); Kevin Zinger (exec.); Everlast (also exec.); Darius Holbert; Fredwreck

Everlast chronology
Love, War and the Ghost of Whitey Ford (2008)	Songs of the Ungrateful Living (2011)	The Life Acoustic (2013)

Professional ratings
Review scores
Source	Rating
AllMusic	3.5/5 stars
RapReviews	6/10 stars
411mania	7/10 stars
Starpulse	(B+)

Songs of the Ungrateful Living is the sixth solo studio album by the American recording artist Everlast. It was released on October 18, 2011, a follow-up to Love, War and the Ghost of Whitey Ford, by Martyr Inc Records in partnership with EMI. This was Everlast's second record released on his own label.

The album peaked at No. 48 on the Billboard 200, and its lead single, "I Get By", peaked at No. 23 on the Billboard Alternative Songs.

== Track listing ==
No.	Title	Writer(s)	Length
1.	"Long at All"	E. Schrody	2:57
2.	"Gone for Good"	D. Holbert; E. Schrody; J. Whitley	3:13
3.	"I Get By"	E. Schrody; Z. Sciacca	3:39
4.	"Little Miss America"	E. Schrody	3:59
5.	"My House"	E. Schrody; L. Dimant	3:34
6.	"Long Time"	D. Holbert; E. Schrody	3:27
7.	"Friday the 13th"	D. Holbert; E. Schrody	2:31
8.	"The Crown"	D. Holbert; E. Schrody	3:48
9.	"Sixty-Five Roses"	D. Holbert; E. Schrody	3:11
10.	"Moneymaker"	E. Schrody	3:13
11.	"The Rain"	E. Schrody; F. Nassar	3:26
12.	"Some of Us Pray"	D. Holbert; E. Schrody	2:55
13.	"I'll Be There for You"	E. Schrody; B. Khalil	3:51
14.	"Even God Don't Know"	D. Holbert; E. Schrody; J. Whitler	4:13
15.	"A Change Is Gonna Come"	S. Cooke	3:17
Total length:			51:06

Bonus tracks
No.	Title	Writer(s)	Length
1.	"Everyone Respects the Gun"	E. Schrody
2.	"Final Trumpet"	E. Schrody
3.	"Black Coffee" (Live Acoustic)	E. Schrody; K. Ciancia
4.	"What It's Like" (Live Acoustic)	E. Schrody
5.	"White Trash Beautiful" (Live Acoustic)	E. Schrody

Notes

- "A Change Is Gonna Come" is a cover version of Sam Cooke's song "A Change Is Gonna Come" from Ain't That Good News (1964).

Samples

- "Gone for Good" samples "Blue Suede Shoes" by Carl Perkins (1956).
- "I Get By" samples "Dirt In The Ground" by Tom Waits (1992) and "Top Billin'" by Audio Two (1987).
- "My House" samples "Get Out of My Life, Woman" by Iron Butterfly (1968).
- "The Rain" samples "Till Death Do Us Part" by Cypress Hill (2004).

== Personnel ==
- Erik Francis Schrody – vocals, guitar, producer, executive producer
- Darius Holbert – backing vocals, pedal steel guitar, keyboards, banjo, co-producer
- Joe Blaq – backing vocals
- Sharon Youngblood – backing vocals
- Joel Whitley – guitar, bass guitar
- Keefus Ciancia – keyboards
- Leo Costa – drums, percussion
- Leor DiMant – drum programming, scratches
- David Rojas – drum programming
- Gabriel Noel – cello, viola, bass guitar
- Dan Boissy – tenor saxophone, baritone saxophone
- Kerry Loeschen – trombone
- Sebastian Leger – trumpet
- Tom Baker – mastering
- Jamey Staub – mixing
- Joe Reiver – recording, additional producer
- Ivory Daniel – management, executive producer
- Kevin Zinger – management, executive producer
- Farid Nassar – co-producer (track 11)
- Lucas Irwin – design
- Tristan Eaton – cover art

== Charts ==
Chart (2011)	Peak position
Austrian Albums (Ö3 Austria)	55
German Albums (Offizielle Top 100)	58
Swiss Albums (Schweizer Hitparade)	30
US Billboard 200	48
US Top Rock Albums (Billboard)	14
US Top Alternative Albums (Billboard)	10
US Independent Albums (Billboard)	10
