= Take It Easy (Collie Buddz album) =

Studio album by Collie Buddz
- Released: September 29, 2023
- Genre: Reggae
- Length: 35:59
- Label: Harper Digital
- Producers: Collie Buddz; Fatbabs; Jason 'J Vibe' Farmer; Johnny Cosmic; Massive B

Collie Buddz chronology
Hybrid (2019)	Take It Easy (2023)

Singles from Take It Easy
- 1. "Twisted Agenda" Released: January 28, 2022; 2. "Take It Easy" Released: February 3, 2023; 3. "You Around" Released: August 11, 2023

Professional ratings
Review scores
Source	Rating
Reggae Vibes	97/100%

Take It Easy is the fourth studio album by Bermudian dancehall artist Collie Buddz. It was released on September 29, 2023 via Harper Digital Entertainment. Production was handled by Jason 'J Vibe' Farmer, Massive B, Fatbabs, Johnny Cosmic, and Collie Buddz himself, who also served as executive producer together with Igor Katz and Abel Cooper. It features guest appearances from Bounty Killer, B-Real, Danny Towers, Demarco and Keznamdi. The album peaked at number 10 on the Billboard Reggae Albums chart in the US. It was supported with three singles: "Twisted Agenda", "Take It Easy" and "You Around".

The album was nominated for a Grammy Award for Best Reggae Album at the 67th Annual Grammy Awards.

== Track listing ==
No.	Title	Producer(s)	Length
1.	"Take It Easy"	Collie Buddz; Jason 'J Vibe' Farmer	3:01
2.	"High Grade (International Herb)"	Collie Buddz; Jason 'J Vibe' Farmer	2:46
3.	"Brighter Days"	Collie Buddz; Jason 'J Vibe' Farmer	3:36
4.	"You Around"	Collie Buddz; Jason 'J Vibe' Farmer	2:43
5.	"Close to You"	Collie Buddz; Jason 'J Vibe' Farmer	3:00
6.	"No Bush Weed" (featuring B-Real)	Collie Buddz; Jason 'J Vibe' Farmer	2:42
7.	"Twisted Agenda" (featuring Bounty Killer)	Massive B	2:40
8.	"Mr. Wicked"	Babz	2:29
9.	"Trap Set" (featuring Demarco)	Collie Buddz; Jason 'J Vibe' Farmer	3:06
10.	"Money Up" (featuring Keznamdi)	Collie Buddz	2:42
11.	"Collision" (featuring Danny Towers)		3:18
12.	"Hold Firm"	Collie Buddz; Johnny Cosmic (co.)	3:56
Total length:			35:59

== Personnel ==
- Colin "Collie Buddz" Harper – songwriter, vocals, producer, mixing, executive producer
- Louis "B-Real" Freese – songwriter
- Rodney "Bounty Killer" Price – songwriter
- Collin "Demarco" Edwards – songwriter
- Kesnamdi McDonald – songwriter
- Danny Towers – songwriter
- Ronny Guitierrez – guitar
- Shawn Mitchell – bass
- Noah Cronin – drums, mixing
- Brian Williamson – drums
- Makiri Whyte – drums
- Jason 'J Vibe' Farmer – producer
- Bobby "Massive B" Konders – producer
- Benjamin "Fatbabs" Jeanne – producer
- Johnny Cosmic – producer, mixing
- Niko Marzouca – mixing
- Robert Marks – mixing
- Bob Horn – mixing
- Nicholas Di Lorenzo – mastering
- Chris Gehringer – mastering
- Michael Denten – mastering
- Igor Katz – executive producer
- Abel Cooper – executive producer
- Blair Goodie – artwork

== Charts ==
Chart (2023)	Peak position
US Reggae Albums (Billboard)	10
