= Smoke n Mirrors =

Smoke N Mirrors

Studio album by B-Real
- Released: February 24, 2009
- Recorded: 2006–2009
- Genre: West Coast hip hop; Latin hip hop
- Length: 1:00:05
- Label: Duck Down (DDM CD 2090); Koch
- Producer: Jay Turner (also exec.); B-Real (also exec.); Scoop DeVille; Soopafly; Alchemist; Fifth; Salam Wreck; Sick Jacken

Professional ratings
Review scores
Source	Rating
AllMusic	3.5/5 stars
HipHopDX	3/5
RapReviews	8/10
XXL	L

Smoke N Mirrors is the debut solo studio album by American rapper B-Real of Cypress Hill. It was released on February 24, 2009, through Duck Down Records with distribution via Koch Entertainment. Production was handled by Jay Turner, Scoop DeVille, Soopafly, Alchemist, Fifth, Salam Wreck, Sick Jacken and B-Real himself. It features guest appearances from Young De, Babydoll Refresh, Bo-Roc, Tek Nizzle, Buckshot, Damian Marley, Kurupt, Mal Verde, Sen Dog, Sick Jacken, Snoop Dogg, Too $hort, Trace Midas and Xzibit.

The album peaked at number 97 in Switzerland, number 142 in France, and number 148 in the United States.

== Track listing ==
No.	Title	Producer(s)	Length
1.	"Smoke N Mirrors" (featuring Bo-Roc)	Scoop DeVille	4:55
2.	"Gangsta Music" (featuring Bo-Roc)	Soopafly	3:19
3.	"Don't Ya Dare Laugh" (featuring Young De and Xzibit)	Scoop DeVille	3:57
4.	"Everything U Want" (featuring Buckshot)	Soopafly	3:29
5.	"6 Minutes" (featuring Young De and Tekneek)	Alchemist	3:41
6.	"Psycho Realm Revolution" (featuring Sick Jacken)	Sick Jacken	4:46
7.	"Fire" (featuring Damian Marley)	B-Real	3:21
8.	"10 Steps Behind" (featuring Young De and Tekneek)	Jay Turner	4:42
9.	"Get That Dough" (featuring Babydoll Refresh)	Fifth	3:53
10.	"Dr. Hyphenstein" (featuring Snoop Dogg, Young De and Trace Midas)	B-Real	3:59
11.	"Stack'n Paper"	Jay Turner	4:22
12.	"1 Life" (featuring Sen Dog and Mal Verde)	B-Real	4:21
13.	"Dude Vs. Homie"	Jay Turner	3:32
14.	"When They Hate You" (featuring Babydoll Refresh)	Salam Wreck	3:29
15.	"When We're Fucking" (featuring Kurupt, Too $hort and Young De)	Jay Turner	4:23
16.	"Snake Eyes" (featuring Mellow Man Ace)		4:26
Total length:			1:00:05

Sample credits

- "Smoke N Mirrors" contains a sample of "Children of the Night" by The Stylistics
- "Don't Ya Dare Laugh" contains a sample of "Tom's Diner" by Suzanne Vega
- "6 Minutes" contains a sample of "Captain Scarlet & the Mysterons Theme" by Barry Gray
- "Fire" contains a sample of "Posse on Broadway" by Sir Mix-a-Lot

== Personnel ==
- Louis Freese – vocals, producer (tracks: 7, 10, 12), executive producer
- Bo Roc – vocals (tracks: 1, 2)
- Demrick Ferm – vocals (tracks: 3, 5, 8, 10, 15)
- Alvin Nathaniel Joiner – vocals (track 3)
- Kenyatta Blake – vocals (track 4), co-executive producer
- Daniel Wayne – vocals (tracks: 5, 8)
- Joaquin Gonzalez – vocals & producer (track 6)
- Damian "Jr. Gong" Marley – vocals (track 7)
- Babydoll Refresh – vocals (tracks: 9, 14)
- Calvin Cordozar Broadus Jr. – vocals (track 10)
- Trace Midas – vocals (track 10)
- Senen Reyes – vocals (track 12)
- Mal Verde – vocals (track 12)
- Ricardo Emmanuel Brown – vocals (track 15)
- Todd Anthony Shaw – vocals (track 15)
- Elijah Blue Molina – producer (tracks: 1, 3)
- Priest "Soopafly" Brooks – producer (tracks: 2, 4)
- Daniel Alan Maman – producer (track 5)
- Jay Turner – producer (tracks: 8, 11, 13, 15), executive producer
- Fifth – producer (track 9)
- Salam Nassar – producer (track 14)
- Richard "Segal" Huredia – engineering
- Drew "Dru-Ha" Friedman – co-executive producer
- Estevan Oriol – artwork, design, photography
- Lucky Alvarez – design, layout
- Sam Skrilla – additional artwork

== Charts ==
Chart (2009)	Peak position
French Albums (SNEP)	142
Swiss Albums (Schweizer Hitparade)	97
US Billboard 200	148
US Top R&B/Hip-Hop Albums (Billboard)	82
US Independent Albums (Billboard)	20
US Heatseekers Albums (Billboard)	5
