= Everlast =

American rapper, singer, and songwriter (born 1969)

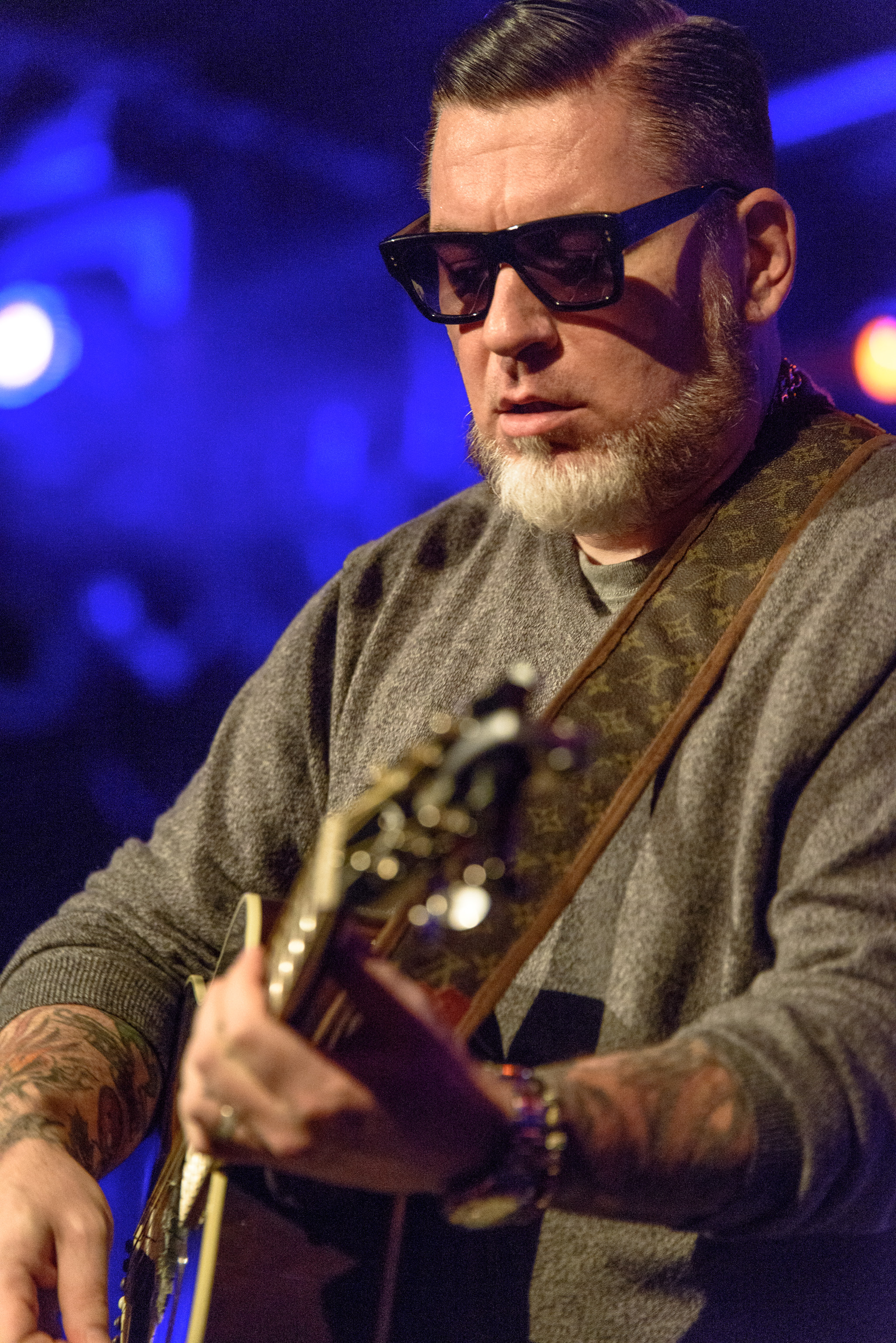
- Everlast performing in 2015

Background information
- Also known as: Whitey Ford
- Born: Erik Francis Schrody; August 18, 1969 (age 57); Long Island, New York, U.S.
- Origin: Los Angeles, California, U.S.
- Genres: Hip-hop; folk rock; blues
- Occupations: Rapper; singer; songwriter
- Instruments: Vocals; guitar; piano; turntables
- Years active: 1987–present
- Labels: Martyr Inc.; Warner Bros.; Tommy Boy; Island; Island Def Jam; Universal; Play It Again Sam
- Formerly of: House of Pain; La Coka Nostra; Rhyme Syndicate
- Website: martyr-inc.com

Erik Francis Schrody (born August 18, 1969), known by his stage names Everlast and Whitey Ford, is an American rapper, singer, and songwriter who was the frontman for hip-hop group House of Pain. His breakthrough as a solo artist came in 1998 with his album Whitey Ford Sings the Blues, which blended rock and hip-hop and garnered him his first Grammy Award nomination for the song "What It's Like". The album peaked at number 9 on the Billboard 200 album chart, while the single peaked at number 13 on the Billboard Hot 100 singles chart. As of 2023, they remain his highest mainstream chart positions for an album and single respectively.

In 2000, Everlast received a Grammy Award for Best Rock Performance by a Duo or Group with Vocal with Latin rock band Santana for "Put Your Lights On". From 2006 to 2012, he was also part of the hip-hop supergroup La Coka Nostra, which consisted of members of House of Pain and other rappers. In 2008, he was nominated for an Emmy Award for the main title theme of the TV series Saving Grace. He has released eight albums in his solo career, each featuring a blend of hip-hop, rock, blues, folk, and Americana. His most recent release is Embers to Ashes, which came out on August 28, 2026.

== Formative years ==
Everlast is of German and Irish heritage. His mother, Rita Rose Mulligan (1946-2015), worked as a restaurant franchise manager; and his father, Edward F. Schrody (1945-2006) was a construction worker. Everlast went to Taft High School in Los Angeles at the same time Ice Cube, Epic Mazur, and N.W.A and the Posse member Krazy Dee were attending.

== Career ==
=== Late 1980s–mid 1990s: Early career and group's breakthrough ===
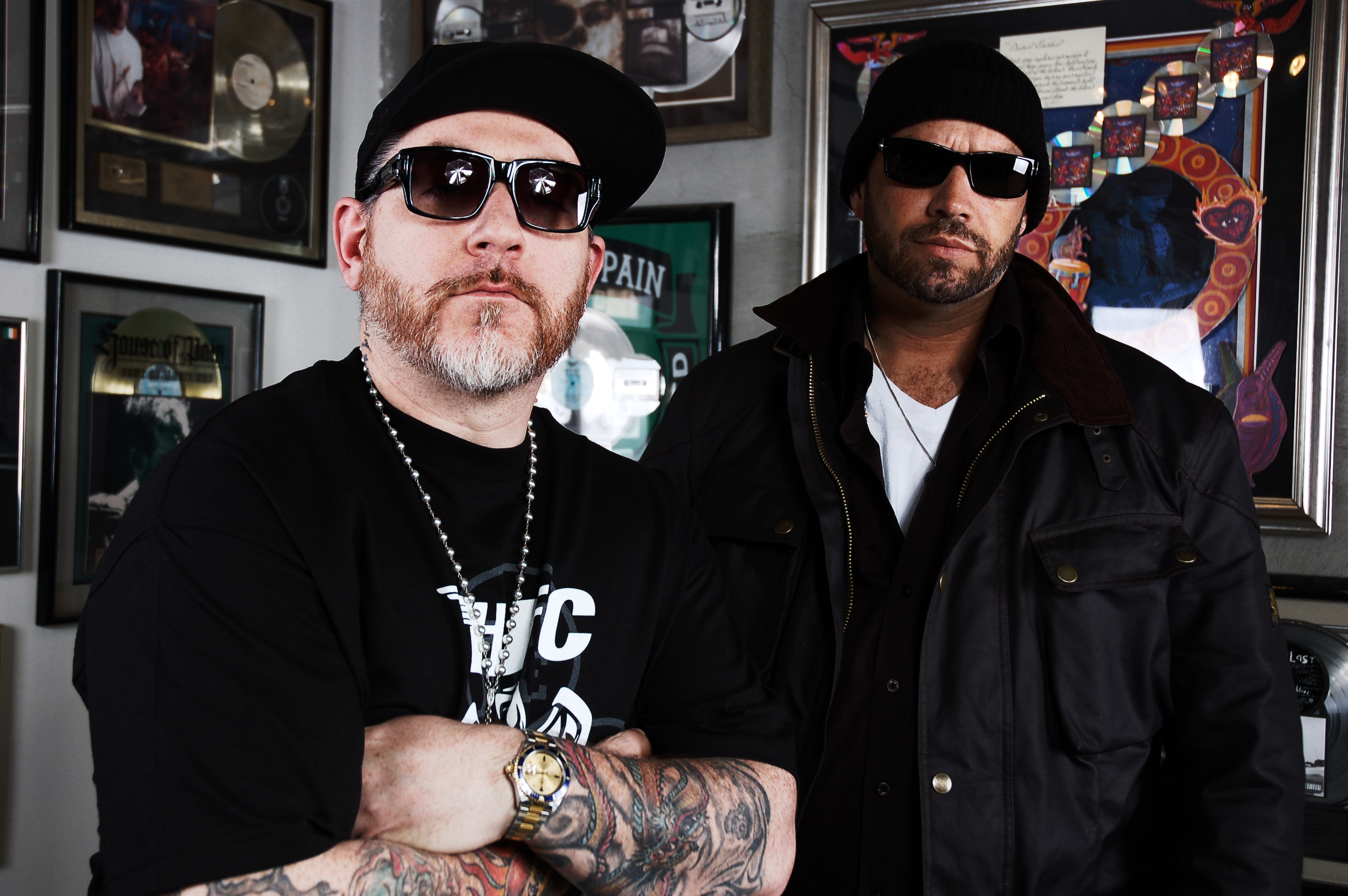
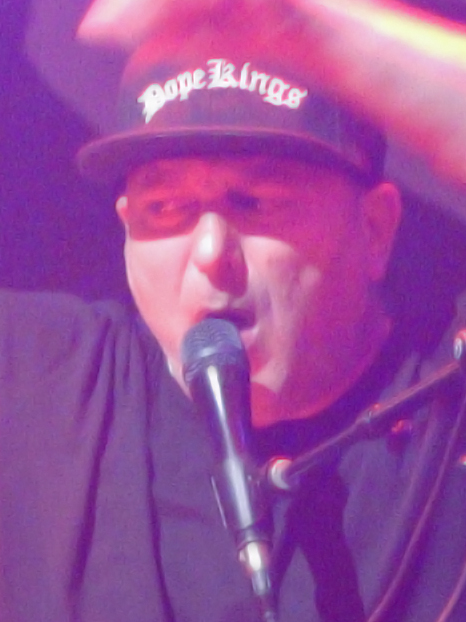
Members of House of Pain, left to right: Everlast, Danny Boy, and DJ Lethal

Emerging as a member of Ice-T's group Rhyme Syndicate, Everlast's 1990 debut album Forever Everlasting was a commercial disappointment. Following the album's failure, Everlast teamed up with fellow Taft High alumni DJ Lethal and Danny Boy to form the hip-hop trio House of Pain. The group was signed to Tommy Boy Records, and their 1992 self-titled debut album went multi-platinum, spawning the successful DJ Muggs-produced single "Jump Around".

Fashioning themselves as rowdy Irish-American hooligans (DJ Lethal is actually Latvian-born), they toured with various rap and alternative rock bands such as the Ramones, Beastie Boys and Rage Against the Machine after their breakthrough. They participated together with Helmet, along with several other rap acts, on the influential 1993 rock-rap collaborative Judgment Night movie soundtrack (Everlast also played a villain in the film). The group disbanded in 1996, and Everlast once again pursued a solo career.

=== 1998–2001: Solo breakthrough ===
Everlast's 1998 album Whitey Ford Sings the Blues was both a commercial and critical success (selling more than three million copies). Whitey Ford Sings the Blues was hailed for its blend of rap with acoustic and electric guitars, developed by Everlast together with producers Dante Ross and John Gamble. The album's lead single "What It's Like" proved to be his most popular and successful song, although the follow-up single, "Ends", also reached the U.S. rock top 10.

Everlast followed up this success by collaborating with Santana on the track "Put Your Lights On" on Santana's 1999 album Supernatural. It charted at No. 118 on the pop chart, but did considerably better with rock radio airplay, peaking at No. 8 on the Mainstream Rock Tracks chart. "Put Your Lights On" won Best Rock Performance by a Duo or Group with Vocal at the 2000 Grammy Awards.

Despite the success of Whitey Ford Sings the Blues and his success with Santana, Everlast's follow-up album, Eat at Whitey's (2000), stumbled commercially at first in the United States. However, it was certified gold on December 18, 2000. The album was also embraced critically, especially by Rolling Stone, whose review placed the album between "good" and "great", with it being focused as that month's most important release.

=== Feud with Eminem ===
That year, a feud erupted between Everlast and Eminem. Eminem and Everlast crossed paths before a concert in early 1999. Eminem says he did not greet Everlast because he did not recognize him right away, and said Everlast did not acknowledge him. Everlast's version is that he tried to congratulate Eminem on his success, and Eminem blew him off.

Everlast's verse from the Dilated Peoples all star track "Ear Drums Pop (Remix)" contained a thinly veiled reference to Eminem ("Cock my hammer, spit a comet like Haley/I buck a .380 on ones that act shady"), and went on to warn "You might catch a beatdown out where I come from" in his recounting of the incident. Eminem, in turn, blasted Everlast several times in public and with the song "I Remember (Dedication to Whitey Ford)" released as the B-side to his group D12's 12" vinyl single "Shit on You".

Everlast responded with the track "Whitey's Revenge", released only on his official website. While the song contained references to Eminem's strained relationships with his wife and mother, it was "Better run and check your kid for your DNA", again referring to Eminem's daughter, Hailie Jade Mathers, that set Eminem off. The track ends with the spoken words, "I ain't wasting no more time with you man. Fuck that shit, That's it".

Eminem and D12 responded with "Quitter", the second half of which is a take off on "Hit 'Em Up" by 2Pac and the Outlawz (a diss song mainly aimed at The Notorious B.I.G.). The track ends with the spoken words, "Fuck him, that's it, I'm done, I promise, I'm done, that's it." It was reported that long-time friends of Eminem, group Limp Bizkit, were meant to be featured on "Quitter", but Fred Durst canceled at the last moment. Everlast echoed similar sentiment on the status of this feud, stating in various interviews that he felt everything had been said and he would now refrain from further responses. However, following Eminem's disses towards them on "Quitter", Evidence of Dilated Peoples responded with the track "Search 4 Bobby Fisher".

During a Total Request Live interview, DJ Lethal, who had since joined Limp Bizkit, made a statement that if Mathers and Schrody were to fight in real life, Everlast would win. This irked Eminem, and an insulting track aimed at both Everlast and Limp Bizkit appeared on D12's mainstream debut, Devil's Night, as a hidden track called "Girls". B-Real of Cypress Hill claimed that Everlast recorded another diss towards Eminem following the release of "Quitter", but it went unreleased due to him deciding to instead quash the feud. According to Eminem, their fight has settled since then and there is a mutual respect between Mathers and Schrody. Further indicating an end to lyrical hostilities between the two, Eminem seemingly gave a shout out to Everlast on The Marshall Mathers LP 2 song entitled "Baby".

=== 2002–present: Subsequent success ===
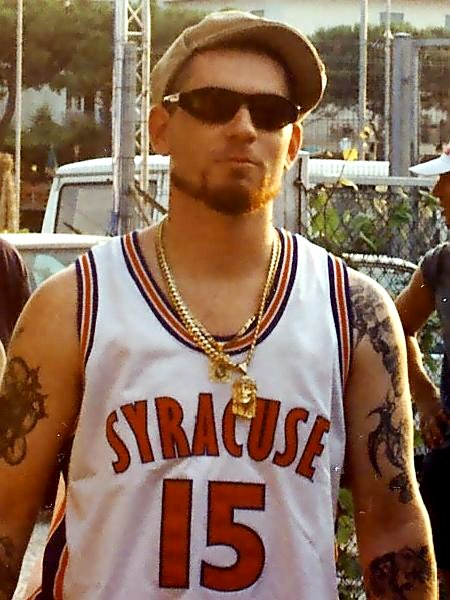
Everlast in 2006

After the sale of the Tommy Boy Records' catalog of master tapes to Warner Bros. Records and its metamorphosis to a dance music label in 2002, Everlast was without a label, but in 2003 he signed with Island/Def Jam. His fourth solo album, White Trash Beautiful (2004), was subsequently released after almost a four-year hiatus. Produced by Everlast and Dante Ross and featuring a lead single of the same name, White Trash Beautiful was described as an "effective mix of hip-hop trope and bluesy strum."

In early 2006, Everlast teamed up with his former House of Pain mates DJ Lethal and Danny Boy to join the hip-hop group La Coka Nostra. The group first came to be due to the former House of Pain hype man Danny Boy starting the group as a collective with rappers Slaine and Big Left (who has since left the group). Soon after the group started Ill Bill of a now disbanded Non Phixion and Everlast joined the group. Their first known song was "Fuck Tony Montana" which features B-Real of Cypress Hill and Sick Jacken. Due to the popularity of the song online, the group released several more online for free.

In 2007, Everlast was chosen to do the theme song for the TV show Saving Grace. The song plays during the show's main title sequence, and was originally released to digital outlets only; however, it was also included on Everlast's fifth solo album, Love, War and the Ghost of Whitey Ford. The album was released on September 23, 2008, on Everlast's own record label Martyr Inc, with distribution by Hickory Records/Sony/ATV Music Publishing. (It was revealed through diditleak.co.uk that the album leaked out early on Friday August 29.) A second single and video, "Letter Home From the Garden of Stone", was released for free download from martyr-inc.com in December 2007. The third single, a cover of Johnny Cash's "Folsom Prison Blues", was released to download on August 19. The music video for "Stone in My Hand" debuted on the Martyr Inc. website on October 28, 2008 making it the fourth video for the album.

La Coka Nostra’s debut album, A Brand You Can Trust, was released on July 14, 2009. The album features guests like Snoop Dogg, B-Real, Bun B, Immortal Technique, Sick Jacken, and Q-Unique. La Coka Nostra then joined the likes of Nas and Ill Bill's brother Necro on Rock the Bells.

In October 2011, his sixth solo album, Songs of the Ungrateful Living, was released through Martyr Inc. in partnership with EMI. Produced by Everlast in collaboration with DJ Lethal, Fredwreck and Darius Holbert, the album featured the lead single "I Get By". Like Love, War and the Ghost of Whitey Ford, a number of tracks on Songs of the Ungrateful Living contained overtly political and social themes.

Everlast left the group in 2012 in order to attend to his daughter's medical issues.

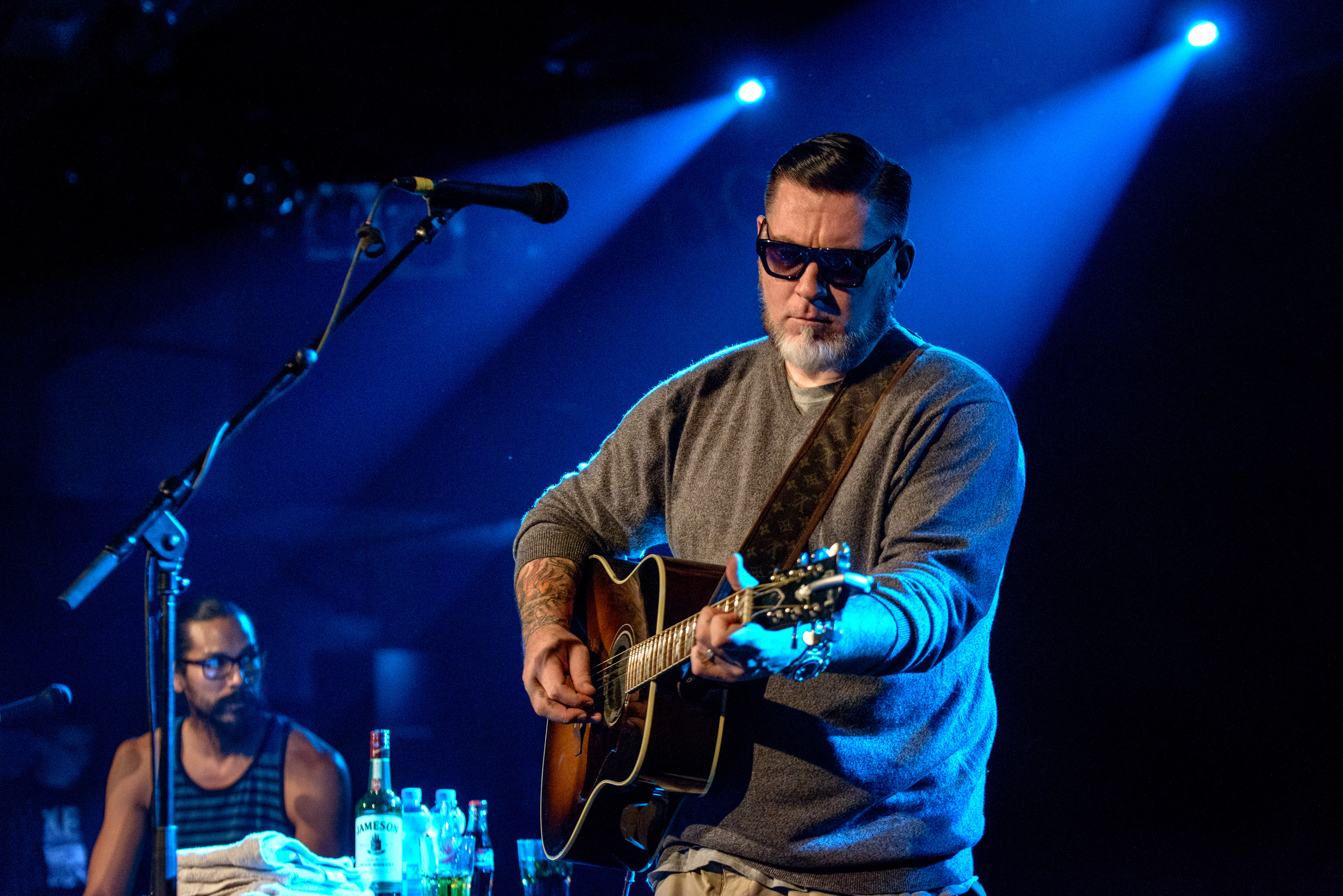
Everlast at Free & Easy Festival 2015

In 2013, Everlast and Eminem were featured on a Busta Rhymes track together. On August 27, 2013, Everlast's acoustic album The Life Acoustic was released via his own record label Martyr Inc. That year, Everlast sued the inflatables company "Jump Around Rentals" for using the phrase "if you want to get down jump around" in their advertising, arguing it belonged to House of Pain.

Starting in 2017, joining with Divine Styler and Sick Jacken, Everlast released a Warporn mixtape.

On September 7, 2018, Everlast's seventh studio album Whitey Ford's House of Pain was released.

== Personal life ==
On the day Schrody finished recording Whitey Ford Sings the Blues, he experienced a tightening in his chest. It persisted for five hours, prompting his co-producer and friend John Gamble to insist Schrody go to the hospital. Schrody had a torn aortic valve, and his heart was essentially "drowning in blood".

By 1996, Everlast had converted from Catholicism to Islam. In a 2011 interview he stated, "even though I would consider myself still to be Muslim, I don't really. I really kinda reject all organized religion... when a bunch of people get together and are spiritual and they feel good about each other, great things can happen. But when you start enforcing your philosophy and ideals on other people who don’t necessarily share them all, it turns into Palestine and Israel, and all these kinds of things. Ya know? Indians and Pakistanis, ya know?"

In 2015, he stated, "To me, Islam is mine. Allah is God of all the worlds, and all mankind and all the Alameen (worlds/universe). Islam is my personal relationship with God. So nobody can put any more pressure on me than I can put on myself. But as far as the mosque where I pray, I have never felt more at home or more welcome."

== Musical style and influences ==
Everlast's music ranges from blues to hip-hop and rock. After having previously established himself as a rapper earlier in his career, Everlast subsequently reinvented himself with a new sound that fused acoustic rock, folk, blues and hip-hop under the alias Whitey Ford. According to Stephen Thomas Erlewine, "Nobody ever would have guessed that the leader of House of Pain would come back after a bout of obscurity and a serious heart attack to reinvent himself as a hip-hop troubadour, rasping out bluesy folk-rock to a steady-rolling beat."

Everlast's influences include N.W.A, Beastie Boys, Cypress Hill, Ice-T, Gang Starr, Johnny Cash, Bob Dylan, Tom Petty, The Rolling Stones, Bruce Springsteen, Neil Young, and Run-DMC.

== Accolades ==
Year	Nominee / work	Award	Result	Ref.
2008	"Saving Grace"	Primetime Emmy Award for Outstanding Original Main Title Theme Music	Nominated	
2000	"Put Your Lights On"	Grammy Award for Best Rock Performance by a Duo or Group with Vocal	Won	
2000	"What It's Like"	Grammy Award for Best Male Rock Vocal Performance	Nominated	
1992	"Jump Around"	Grammy Award for Best Rap Performance by a Duo or Group	Nominated	

== Discography ==
Studio albums

- Forever Everlasting (1990)
- Whitey Ford Sings the Blues (1998)
- Eat at Whitey's (2000)
- White Trash Beautiful (2004)
- Love, War and the Ghost of Whitey Ford (2008)
- Songs of the Ungrateful Living (2011)
- The Life Acoustic (2013)
- Whitey Ford's House of Pain (2018)
- Embers to Ashes (2026)

== Notes ==
- A "Ends" did not enter the Billboard Hot 100, but peaked at number 9 on the Bubbling Under Hot 100 Singles chart, which acts as a 25-song extension to the Hot 100.
- B "Put Your Lights On" did not enter the Billboard Hot 100, but peaked at number 18 on the Bubbling Under Hot 100 Singles chart, which acts as a 25-song extension to the Hot 100.
