= 42nd Annual Grammy Awards =

2000 US music awards ceremony

- Date: February 23, 2000
- Location: Staples Center, Los Angeles, California
- Hosted by: Rosie O'Donnell
- Most awards: Santana (8)
- Most nominations: Santana (10)
- Website: https://www.grammy.com/awards/42nd-annual-grammy-awards

Television/radio coverage
- Network: CBS

The 42nd Annual Grammy Awards were held on February 23, 2000, at the Staples Center in Los Angeles, California. They recognized accomplishments by musicians from the year 1999. Nominations were announced on January 4, 2000. Santana was the main recipient with eight Grammys, tying Michael Jackson's record for most awards won in a single night. Santana's album Supernatural was awarded a total of nine awards. Former Mouseketeers and American teen singers (at the time), Britney Spears and Christina Aguilera, were both nominated for Best New Artist, ultimately won by Aguilera.

== Performers ==
Artist(s)	Song(s)
Will Smith; Sisqo	"Freakin' It" "Wild Wild West"
Backstreet Boys	"How Deep Is Your Love" "Papa Was a Rollin' Stone" "I'll Make Love to You" "Show Me the Meaning of Being Lonely"
TLC	"Unpretty" "No Scrubs"
Sting; Cheb Mami	"Desert Rose"
Carlos Santana; Rob Thomas	"Smooth"
Britney Spears	"From the Bottom of My Broken Heart" "...Baby One More Time"
Elton John; Backstreet Boys	"Philadelphia Freedom"
Faith Hill	"Let Me Let Go"
Ricky Martin; Marc Anthony; Ibrahim Ferrer; Chucho Valdes; Poncho Sanchez	Tribute to Latin Music "María"; I Need to Know; Candela
Kid Rock	"Only God Knows Why" "Bawitdaba" "We're an American Band"
Dixie Chicks	"Goodbye Earl"
Whitney Houston	"It's Not Right but It's Okay" "I Learned from the Best"
Diana Krall; Erykah Badu; George Benson	"I Can't Give You Anything But Love"

== Presenters ==
- Jennifer Lopez & David Duchovny - Best R&B Album
- Ray Benson, Clint Black & Lisa Hartman Black - Best Female Country Vocal Performance
- Martina McBride, Ray Romano & Kevin James - Best Country Album
- Christina Aguilera & Jimmy Smits - Announced the 1st Annual Latin Grammy Awards and introduced Marc Anthony
- Ruben Blades - Introduced Ibrahim Ferrer, Chucho Valdes, Poncho Sanchez
- Andy Garcia - Introduced Ricky Martin
- Melissa Etheridge, Sarah McLachlan & Sheryl Crow - Best New Artist
- Busta Rhymes, Jamie Foxx & Jane Krakowski - Best Female R&B Vocal Performance
- Mary J. Blige & 'NSync - Best Male Pop Vocal Performance
- Shirley Manson, Moby & Michael Clarke Duncan - Best Rap Performance by a Duo or Group
- Macy Gray, Phil Collins & Andy Williams - Song of the Year
- Vince Gill, Neil Diamond & Gloria Estefan - Record of the Year
- Bob Dylan & Lauryn Hill - Album of the Year

== Award winners ==
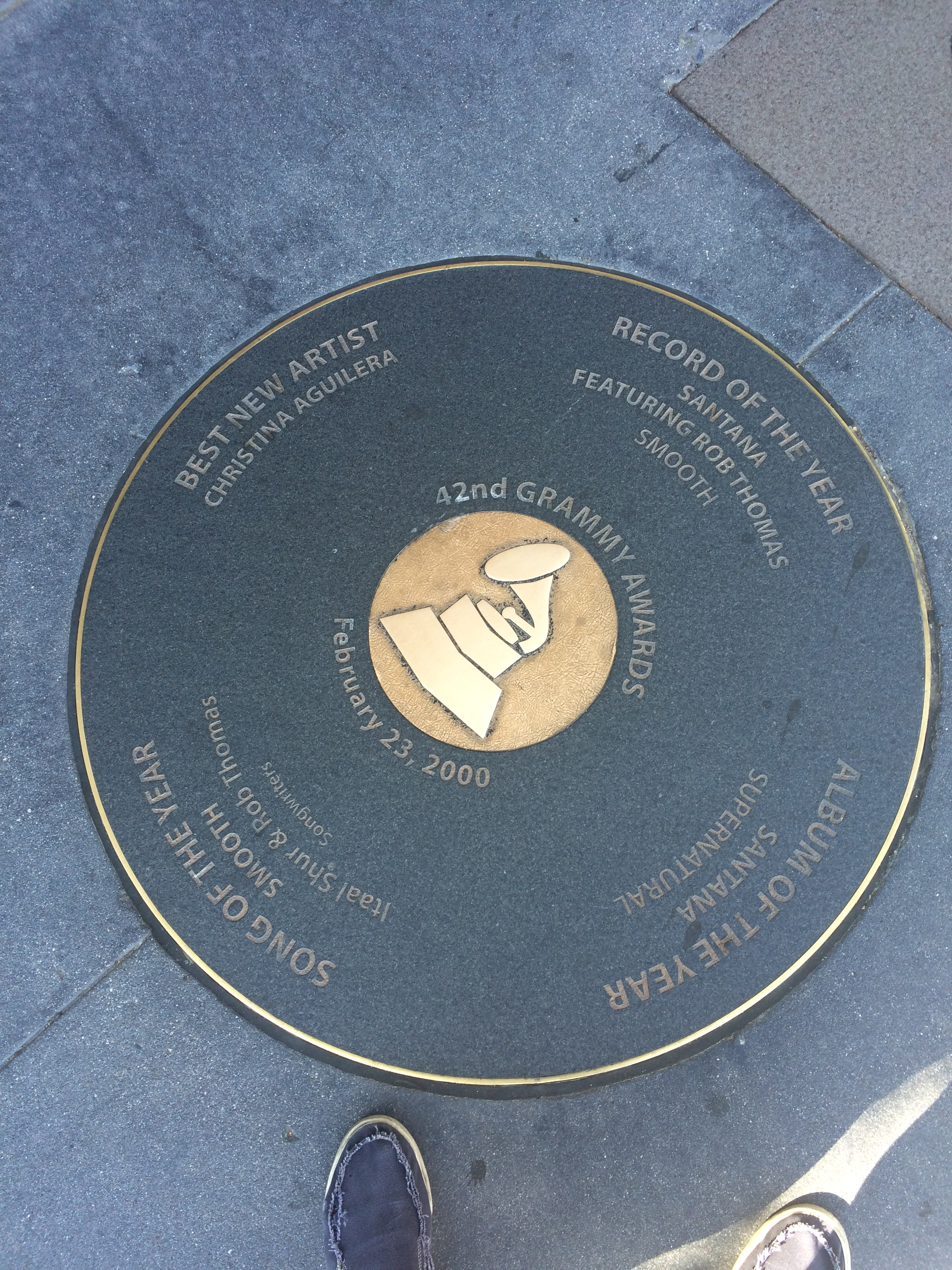
A circle plateau with the winners of the most notable categories located in downtown Los Angeles

=== General ===
Record of the Year

- "Smooth" – Santana featuring Rob Thomas
  - Matt Serletic, producer; David Thoener engineer/mixer
- "I Want It That Way" – Backstreet Boys
  - Kristian Lundin & Max Martin, producers; Kristian Lundin, Max Martin & Daniel Boom, engineers/mixers
- "Believe" – Cher
  - Brian Rawling & Mark Taylor, producers; Mark Taylor, engineer/mixer
- "Livin' la Vida Loca" – Ricky Martin
  - Desmond Child & Robi Rosa, producers; Craig Lozowick, German Ortiz, Nathan Malki & Charles Dye, engineers/mixers
- "No Scrubs" – TLC
  - Kevin "She'kspere" Briggs, producer; Carlton Lynn & Leslie Brathwaite, engineers/mixers

Album of the Year

- Supernatural – Santana
  - Carlos Santana, Clive Davis, Stephen M. Harris, Dante Ross, Matt Serletic, Lauryn Hill, Jerry Duplessis, Wyclef Jean, K. C. Porter, Fher Olvera, Alex González, Dust Brothers, Todd Ray, Art Hodge, Charles Goodan & J. B. Eckl, producers; Glen Kolotkin, Mike Couzzi, Jim Gaines, Ben Conrad, Steve Fontano, John Seymour, Andy Salas, Dave Dar, John Gamble, Steve Farrone, Michael Anderson, Tom Lord-Alge, Femio Hernandez, David Thoener, Andy Haller, Gordon "Commissioner Gordon" Williams, Tony Prendatt, Jamie Siegel, Warren Riker, Andy Grassi, Chris Theis, Chuck Bailey, Jason Groucott, Michael McCoy, Jeff Poe, John Karpowich, Adam Olmstead, Claudio Leiva, Tony Flores, Benny Faccone, Anton Pukshansky, David Frazer, Bill Kinsley, Billy Konkel, Tracey Brown, Todd Ray, Glen Kolotkin, Alvaro Villagra, Jim Scott, Matthew Spindel, Alejandro Cassini & Frank Rinella, engineers/mixers; Ted Jensen & Stephen Marcussen, mastering engineers
- Millennium – Backstreet Boys
  - Kristian Lundin, Max Martin, Rami Yacoub, Robert John "Mutt" Lange, Stephen Lipson, Timmy Allen, Mattias Gustafsson, Edwin "Tony" Nicholas & Eric Foster White, producers; Kristian Lundin, Max Martin, Bo Reimer, Daniel Boom, Rami Yacoub, Chris Trevett, George Spatta, Adam Barber, Heff Moraes, Dawn Reinholtz, Devon Kirkpatrick, Mick Guzauski, Stephen George, Adam Blackburn, John Bates & Carl Robinson, engineers/mixers; Tom Coyne, mastering engineer
- Fly – Dixie Chicks
  - Blake Chancey & Paul Worley, producers; Billy Sherrill, Christopher Rowe, Clarke Schleicher, Mark Martin, Tony Castle, John Guess & Patrick Murphy, engineers/mixers; Denny Purcell & Jonathan Russell, mastering engineers
- When I Look in Your Eyes – Diana Krall
  - Tommy LiPuma, Johnny Mandel & David Foster, producers; Al Schmitt, Bill Smith, Koji Egawa, Anthony Ruotolo & Rory Romano, engineers/mixers; Doug Sax, mastering engineer
- FanMail – TLC
  - Dallas Austin, Babyface, L.A. Reid, TLC, Kevin "She'kspere" Briggs, Jimmy Jam and Terry Lewis, Ricciano Lumpkins, Daryl Simmons, Jermaine Dupri, Carl So-Lowe & Debra Killings, producers; Alvin Speights, Vernon Mungo, Carlton Lynn, Leslie Brathwaite, "Jazzy Jeff" Griffin, Sejoon Kahng, Ty Hudson, Dylan Dresdow, Gordon Fordyce, Xavier Smith, Dave Rideau, Steve Hodge, John Horesco IV, Paul Boutin, Kevin Lively, Ralph Cacciurri, Thom Kidd, Jermaine Dupri, Phil Tan, Brian Frye, Aman Junaid, Ricciano Lumpkins, Jon Gass, E'lyk & Claudine Pontier, engineers/mixers; Herb Powers, mastering engineer

Song of the Year

- "Smooth"
  - Itaal Shur & Rob Thomas, songwriters (Santana featuring Rob Thomas)
- "I Want It That Way"
  - Andreas Carlsson & Max Martin, songwriters (Backstreet Boys)
- "Livin' la Vida Loca"
  - Desmond Child & Draco Rosa, songwriters (Ricky Martin)
- "Unpretty"
  - Dallas Austin & Tionne Watkins, songwriters (TLC)
- "You've Got a Way"
  - Robert John "Mutt" Lange & Shania Twain, songwriters (Shania Twain)

Best New Artist

- Christina Aguilera
- Macy Gray
- Kid Rock
- Britney Spears
- Susan Tedeschi

=== Pop ===
Best Female Pop Vocal Performance

- "I Will Remember You" – Sarah McLachlan
- "Genie in a Bottle" – Christina Aguilera
- "Beautiful Stranger" – Madonna
- "Thank U" – Alanis Morissette
- "...Baby One More Time" – Britney Spears

Best Male Pop Vocal Performance

- "Brand New Day" – Sting
- "I Need to Know" – Marc Anthony
- "Mambo No. 5" – Lou Bega
- "Sogno" – Andrea Bocelli
- "Livin' la Vida Loca" – Ricky Martin

Best Pop Performance by a Duo or Group with Vocals

- "Maria Maria" – Santana
- "I Want It That Way" – Backstreet Boys
- "Kiss Me" – Sixpence None the Richer
- "All Star" – Smash Mouth
- "Unpretty" – TLC

Best Pop Collaboration with Vocals

- "Smooth" – Santana featuring Rob Thomas
- "The Prayer" – Celine Dion & Andrea Bocelli
- "When You Believe" – Whitney Houston & Mariah Carey
- "Music of My Heart" – *NSYNC & Gloria Estefan
- "Love of My Life" – Santana featuring Dave Matthews

Best Pop Instrumental Performance

- "El Farol" – Santana
- "The Look of Love" – Herb Alpert
- "A Day in the Life" – Jeff Beck
- "Song C" – Bruce Hornsby
- "Night and Day" – Willie Nelson

Best Dance Recording

- "Believe" – Cher
- "Don't Let This Moment End" – Gloria Estefan
- "Praise You" – Fatboy Slim
- "Waiting for Tonight" – Jennifer Lopez
- "I Will Go with You (Con te partirò)" – Donna Summer

Best Pop Album

- Brand New Day – Sting
- Millennium – Backstreet Boys
- Believe – Cher
- Ricky Martin – Ricky Martin
- Mirrorball – Sarah McLachlan

Best Traditional Pop Vocal Performance

- Bennett Sings Ellington: Hot & Cool – Tony Bennett
- Come by Me – Harry Connick Jr.
- The Movie Album: As Time Goes By – Neil Diamond
- Manilow Sings Sinatra – Barry Manilow
- You're the Top: Love Songs of Cole Porter – Bobby Short

=== Rock ===
Best Female Rock Vocal Performance

- "Sweet Child o' Mine" – Sheryl Crow
- "Bliss" – Tori Amos
- "Jukebox" – Ani DiFranco
- "Angels Would Fall" – Melissa Etheridge
- "Possession" (Live) – Sarah McLachlan

Best Male Rock Vocal Performance

- "American Woman" – Lenny Kravitz
- "Can't Change Me" – Chris Cornell
- "What It's Like" – Everlast
- "The Promise" – Bruce Springsteen
- "Hold On" – Tom Waits

Best Rock Performance by a Duo or Group with Vocal

- "Put Your Lights On" – Santana featuring Everlast
- "Special" – Garbage
- "Black Balloon" – Goo Goo Dolls
- "Malibu" – Hole
- "Scar Tissue" – Red Hot Chili Peppers

Best Hard Rock Performance

- "Whiskey in the Jar" – Metallica
- "Get Born Again" – Alice in Chains
- "Lit Up" – Buckcherry
- "Bawitdaba" – Kid Rock
- "Freak on a Leash" – Korn
- "Nookie" – Limp Bizkit

Best Metal Performance

- "Iron Man" (Live) – Black Sabbath
- "Bad Blood" – Ministry
- "Enter Sandman" – Motörhead
- "Starfuckers, Inc." – Nine Inch Nails
- "Superbeast" – Rob Zombie

Best Rock Instrumental Performance

- "The Calling" – Santana featuring Eric Clapton
- "What Mama Said" – Jeff Beck
- "Espionage" – Green Day
- "Bodyrock" – Moby
- "Windows to the Soul" – Steve Vai

Best Rock Song

- "Scar Tissue"
  - Flea, John Frusciante, Anthony Kiedis & Chad Smith, songwriters (Red Hot Chili Peppers)
- "Angels Would Fall"
  - John Shanks & Melissa Etheridge, songwriters (Melissa Etheridge)
- "The Promise"
  - Bruce Springsteen, songwriter (Bruce Springsteen)
- "Room at the Top"
  - Tom Petty, songwriter (Tom Petty and the Heartbreakers)
- "Special"
  - Garbage, songwriters (Garbage)

Best Rock Album

- Supernatural – Santana
- Breakdown – Melissa Etheridge
- Significant Other – Limp Bizkit
- Echo – Tom Petty and the Heartbreakers
- Californication – Red Hot Chili Peppers

Best Alternative Music Performance

- Mutations – Beck
- To Venus and Back – Tori Amos
- You've Come a Long Way, Baby – Fatboy Slim
- Play – Moby
- The Fragile – Nine Inch Nails

=== R&B ===
Best Female R&B Vocal Performance

- "It's Not Right but It's Okay" – Whitney Houston
- "All That I Can Say" – Mary J. Blige
- "Almost Doesn't Count" – Brandy
- "Love Like This" – Faith Evans
- "Do Something" – Macy Gray

Best Male R&B Vocal Performance

- "Staying Power" – Barry White
- "Did You Ever Know" – Peabo Bryson
- "When a Woman's Fed Up" – R. Kelly
- "Fortunate" – Maxwell
- "Sweet Lady" – Tyrese

Best R&B Performance by a Duo or Group with Vocal

- "No Scrubs" – TLC
- "Spend My Life with You" – Eric Benét featuring Tamia
- "Don't Waste Your Time" – Mary J. Blige & Aretha Franklin
- "Bills, Bills, Bills" – Destiny's Child
- "Heartbreak Hotel" – Whitney Houston featuring Faith Evans & Kelly Price

Best R&B Song

- "No Scrubs"
  - Kandi Burruss, Kevin "She'kspere" Briggs & Tameka Cottle, songwriters (TLC)
- "All That I Can Say"
  - Lauryn Hill, songwriter (Mary J. Blige)
- "Bills, Bills, Bills"
  - Kandi Burruss, Kevin "She'kspere" Briggs, Beyoncé Knowles, LeToya Luckett, LaTavia Roberson & Kelendria Rowland (Destiny's Child)
- "Heartbreak Hotel"
  - Carsten Schack, Kenneth Karlin & Tamara Savage (Whitney Houston)
- "It's Not Right but It's Okay"
  - LaShawn Daniels, Toni Estes, Fred Jerkins III, Rodney Jerkins & Isaac Phillips (Whitney Houston)

Best R&B Album

- FanMail – TLC
- Mary – Mary J. Blige
- My Love Is Your Love – Whitney Houston
- R. – R. Kelly
- Back at One – Brian McKnight

Best Traditional R&B Vocal Performance

- Staying Power – Barry White
- Unconditional Love – Peabo Bryson
- Valence Street – The Neville Brothers
- It's Harder Now – Wilson Pickett
- Intimate – Smokey Robinson

=== Rap ===
Best Rap Solo Performance

- "My Name Is" – Eminem
- "Gimme Some More" – Busta Rhymes
- "Vivrant Thing" – Q-Tip
- "Wild Wild West" – Will Smith
- "Changes" – 2Pac

Best Rap Performance by a Duo or Group

- "You Got Me" – The Roots featuring Erykah Badu and Eve
- "What's It Gonna Be?!" – Busta Rhymes featuring Janet Jackson
- "Satisfy You" – Puff Daddy featuring R. Kelly
- "Still D.R.E." – Dr. Dre featuring Snoop Dogg
- "Guilty Conscience" – Eminem & Dr. Dre

Best Rap Album

- The Slim Shady LP – Eminem; Jeff Bass, Marky Bass & Eminem, producers; Mr. B, engineer/mixer
- E.L.E. (Extinction Level Event): The Final World Front – Busta Rhymes; Robert Burnette, Busta Rhymes & Vinny Nicoletti, engineers/mixers
- Da Real World – Missy "Misdemeanor" Elliott; Timbaland, producer; Jimmy Douglass & Timbaland, engineers/mixers
- I Am – Nas; Rich Travali, engineer/mixer
- Things Fall Apart – The Roots; The Grand Wizzards, producers; Keith Cramer, David Ivory & Axel Niehaus, engineers/mixers

=== Country ===
Best Female Country Vocal Performance

- "Man! I Feel Like a Woman!" – Shania Twain
- "Ordinary Heart" – Emmylou Harris
- "Let Me Let Go" – Faith Hill
- "Forget About It" – Alison Krauss
- "I Love You" – Martina McBride

Best Male Country Vocal Performance

- "Choices" – George Jones
- "Don't Come Cryin' to Me" – Vince Gill
- "That's Right (You're Not from Texas)" – Lyle Lovett
- "Please Remember Me" – Tim McGraw
- "Crazy Little Thing Called Love" – Dwight Yoakam

Best Country Performance by a Duo or Group with Vocal

- "Ready to Run" – Dixie Chicks
- "Honky Tonk Song" – BR549
- "Unbelievable" – Diamond Rio
- "Amazed" – Lonestar
- "Little Good-Byes" – SHeDAISY

Best Country Collaboration with Vocals

- "After the Gold Rush" – Emmylou Harris, Dolly Parton & Linda Ronstadt
- "(God Must Have Spent) A Little More Time on You" – Alabama featuring *NSYNC
- "Going Away Party" – Asleep at the Wheel featuring The Manhattan Transfer & Willie Nelson
- "Roly Poly" – Asleep at the Wheel featuring Dixie Chicks
- "When I Said I Do" – Clint Black with Lisa Hartman Black

Best Country Instrumental Performance

- "Bob's Breakdowns" – Asleep at the Wheel featuring Tommy Allsup, Floyd Domino, Larry Franklin, Vince Gill & Steve Wariner
- "Black Mountain Rag" – Del McCoury, Doc Watson & Mac Wiseman
- "Mr. John Henry, Steel Driving Man" – Marty Stuart & Earl Scruggs
- "The Greatest Love of All Time (Reprise)" – Marty Stuart
- "The Harry Shuffle" – Steve Wariner

Best Country Song

- "Come On Over"
  - Robert John "Mutt" Lange & Shania Twain, songwriters (Shania Twain)
- "Amazed"
  - Marv Green, Chris Lindsey & Aimee Mayo, songwriters (Lonestar)
- "Choices"
  - Mike Curtis & Billy Yates, songwriters (George Jones)
- "Ready to Run"
  - Marcus Hummon & Martie Seidel, songwriters (Dixie Chicks)
- "Two Teardrops"
  - Bill Anderson & Steve Wariner, songwriters (Steve Wariner)

Best Country Album

- Fly – Dixie Chicks
- Ride with Bob – Asleep at the Wheel
- Trio II – Emmylou Harris, Linda Ronstadt & Dolly Parton
- The Cold Hard Truth – George Jones
- Forget About It – Alison Krauss

Best Bluegrass Album

- Ancient Tones – Ricky Skaggs & Kentucky Thunder
- Bluegrass Mandolin Extravaganza – various artists
- The Mountain – Steve Earle & Del McCoury Band
- The Bluegrass Sessions: Tales from the Acoustic Planet, Vol. 2 – Béla Fleck
- I Feel Like Singing Today – Jim Lauderdale, Ralph Stanley & the Clinch Mountain Boys

=== New Age ===
Best New Age Album

- Celtic Solstice – Paul Winter
- Citizen of the World – David Arkenstone
- Turning – Suzanne Ciani
- Inside Monument Valley – Paul Horn & R. Carlos Nakai
- Inner Voices – R. Carlos Nakai
- Plains – George Winston

=== Jazz ===
Best Contemporary Jazz Performance

- Inside – David Sanborn
- Ethnomusicology, Vol. 1 – Russell Gunn
- Animation/Imagination – Tim Hagans
- Joy Ride – Bob James
- Yin-Yang – Victor Wooten

Best Jazz Vocal Performance

- When I Look in Your Eyes – Diana Krall
- It's All About Love – Carla Cook
- Heart of a Woman – Etta James
- Bridges – Dianne Reeves
- Traveling Miles – Cassandra Wilson

Best Jazz Instrumental Solo

- "In Walked Wayne" – Wayne Shorter
- "Straight Up and Down" – Gary Burton
- "Wigwam" – Chick Corea
- "There Is No Greater Love" – Stefon Harris
- "In Vogue" – Chris Potter

Best Jazz Instrumental Performance, Individual or Group

- Like Minds – Gary Burton, Chick Corea, Pat Metheny, Roy Haynes & Dave Holland
- Change – Chick Corea & Origin
- Requiem – Branford Marsalis Quartet
- Art of the Trio 4: Back at the Vanguard – Brad Mehldau
- Inner Voyage – Gonzalo Rubalcaba

Best Large Jazz Ensemble Performance

- Serendipity 18 – Bob Florence
- Far East Suite – Anthony Brown's Asian American Orchestra
- Time's Mirror – Tom Harrell
- Epiphany – Vince Mendoza
- Inspiration – Sam Rivers' Rivbea All-Star Orchestra

Best Latin Jazz Performance

- Latin Soul – Poncho Sanchez
- Tumbao Para Los Congueros Di Mi Vada – Al McKibbon
- Latin Jazz Explosion – Bobby Rodriguez
- Antiguo – Gonzalo Rubalcaba & Cuban Quartet
- Briyumba Palo Congo-Religion of the Congo – Chucho Valdés

=== Gospel ===
Best Rock Gospel Album

- Pray – Rebecca St. James
- Underdog – Audio Adrenaline
- Choose Life – Big Tent Revival
- I Can See Clearly Now – Gospel Gangstaz
- Time – Third Day

Best Pop/Contemporary Gospel Album

- Speechless – Steven Curtis Chapman
- Anointed – Anointed
- The Gift of Christmas – Andraé Crouch
- Gloryland – Dukes of Dixieland
- The Prince of Egypt (Nashville) – Various artists

Best Southern, Country or Bluegrass Gospel Album

- Kennedy Center Homecoming – Bill Gaither & Gloria Gaither
- A Glen Campbell Christmas – Glen Campbell
- Roy Clark Sings & Plays Gospel Greats – Roy Clark
- Winding Through Life – Doyle Lawson & Quicksilver
- The Final Sessions – J. D. Sumner & The Stamps

Best Traditional Soul Gospel Album

- Christmas with Shirley Caesar – Shirley Caesar

Best Contemporary Soul Gospel Album

- Mountain High...Valley Low – Yolanda Adams

Best Gospel Choir or Chorus Album

- High and Lifted Up – Carol Cymbala (choir director), performed by the Brooklyn Tabernacle Choir

=== Blues ===
Best Traditional Blues Album

- Blues on the Bayou – B.B. King

Best Contemporary Blues Album

- Take Your Shoes Off – The Robert Cray Band

=== Children's ===
- Best Musical Album for Children
  - Andy Hill (producer) for The Adventures of Elmo in Grouchland performed by various artists
- Best Spoken Word Album for Children (music producer)
  - Steven Epstein, David Frost (producers), Graham Greene, Kate Winslet & Wynton Marsalis for Listen to the Storyteller

=== Comedy ===
- From 1994 through 2003, see "Best Spoken Comedy Album" under the "Spoken" field, below.

=== Classical ===
- Best Orchestral Performance
  - Michael Tilson Thomas (conductor), the Ragazzi Boys Chorus, the San Francisco Girls Chorus & the San Francisco Symphony Orchestra & Chorus for Stravinsky: Firebird; The Rite of Spring; Perséphone
- Best Classical Vocal Performance
  - Claudio Abbado (conductor), Anne Sofie von Otter, Thomas Quasthoff & the Berliner Philharmonic for Mahler: Des Knaben Wunderhorn
- Best Opera Recording
  - Nicholas Parker (producer), John Eliot Gardiner (conductor), Ian Bostridge, Anne Sofie von Otter, Bryn Terfel, Deborah York, the Monteverdi Choir & the London Symphony Orchestra for Stravinsky: The Rake's Progress
- Best Choral Performance
  - Robert Shafer (conductor), Betty Scott, Joan McFarland (choir directors), the Maryland Boy Choir, the Shenandoah Conservatory Chorus & the Washington Chorus for Britten: War Requiem
- Best Instrumental Soloist(s) Performance (with orchestra)
  - Charles Dutoit (conductor), Martha Argerich & the Montreal Symphony Orchestra for Prokofiev: Piano Concertos Nos. 1 & 3/Bartók: Piano Concerto No. 3
- Best Instrumental Soloist Performance (without orchestra)
  - Vladimir Ashkenazy for Shostakovich: 24 Preludes & Fugues, Op. 87
- Best Small Ensemble Performance (with or without conductor)
  - Joseph Jennings (conductor) & Chanticleer for Colors of Love - Works of Thomas, Stucky, Tavener & Rands
- Best Chamber Music Performance
  - Anne-Sophie Mutter & Lambert Orkis for Beethoven: The Violin Sonatas (Nos. 1–3, Op. 12; Nos. 1–3, Op. 30; "Spring" Sonata)
- Best Classical Contemporary Composition
  - Pierre Boulez (composer) & the Ensemble Inter-Contemporain for Boulez: Répons
- Best Classical Album
  - Andreas Neubronner (producer), Michael Tilson Thomas (conductor), the Peninsula Boys Choir, the San Francisco Girl's Chorus & the San Francisco Symphony Orchestra & Chorus for Stravinsky: Firebird; The Rite of Spring; Perséphone
- Best Classical Crossover Album
  - The Chestnut Brass Company & Peter Schickele for Schickele: Hornsmoke (Piano Concerto No. 2 in F Major "Ole"); Brass Calendar; Hornsmoke - A Horse Opera

=== Composing and arranging ===
- Best Instrumental Composition
  - Don Sebesky (composer) for "Joyful Noise Suite"
- Best Song Written for a Motion Picture, Television or Other Visual Media
  - Madonna & William Orbit (songwriters) for "Beautiful Stranger" performed by Madonna
- Best Instrumental Composition Written for a Motion Picture, Television or Other Visual Media
  - Randy Newman (composer) for A Bug's Life
- Best Instrumental Arrangement
  - Don Sebesky (arranger) for "Chelsea Bridge"
- Best Instrumental Arrangement Accompanying Vocalist(s)
  - Alan Broadbent (arranger) for "Lonely Town" performed by the Charlie Haden Quartet West featuring Shirley Horn

=== Film/TV/media ===
- Best Soundtrack Album
  - Tarzan – Mark Mancina & Phil Collins
  - American Beauty –
  - Austin Powers: The Spy Who Shagged Me –
  - The Matrix –
  - The Prince of Egypt –
- Best Song Written for a Motion Picture, Television or Other Visual Media
  - "Beautiful Stranger" (from Austin Powers: The Spy Who Shagged Me) – Madonna & William Orbit, songwriters (Madonna)
  - "Music of My Heart" (from Music of the Heart) – Diane Warren, songwriter (NSYNC & Diane Warren)
  - "The Prince of Egypt (When You Believe)" (from The Prince of Egypt) – Steven Schwartz & Babyface, songwriters (Mariah Carey & Whitney Houston)
  - "The Time of Your Life" (from A Bug's Life) – Randy Newman, songwriter (Randy Newman)
  - "You'll Be in My Heart" (from Tarzan) – Phil Collins, songwriter (Phil Collins)
- Best Instrumental Composition Written for Motion Picture or Television
  - A Bug's Life - Randy Newman
  - Shakespeare in Love - Stephen Warbeck
  - Star Wars Episode I: The Phantom Menace - John Williams
  - Le Violon Rouge - John Corigliano
  - La Vita è Bella - Nicola Piovani

=== Folk ===
Best Traditional Folk Album

- Press On - June Carter Cash

Best Contemporary Folk Album

- Mule Variations - Tom Waits

=== Historical ===
- Best Historical Album
  - Orrin Keepnews (producer), Steven Lasker (producer & engineer), Paul Brizzi & Dennis Ferrante (engineers) for The Duke Ellington Centennial Edition - The Complete RCA Victor Recordings (1927 - 1973)

=== Latin ===
- Best Latin Pop Performance
  - Rubén Blades for Tiempos
- Best Traditional Tropical Latin Performance
  - Tito Puente for Mambo Birdland
- Best Mexican-American Performance
  - Plácido Domingo for 100 Años de Mariachi
- Best Latin Rock/Alternative Performance
  - Chris Perez Band for Resurrection
- Best Tejano Performance
  - Los Palominos for Por Eso Te Amo
- Best Salsa Performance
  - Los Van Van for Llego...Van Van - Van Van Is Here
- Best Merengue Performance
  - Elvis Crespo for Pintame

=== Musical show ===
- Best Musical Show Album
  - John McDaniel, Stephen Ferrera (producers) & the New Broadway cast with Bernadette Peters & Tom Wopat for Annie Get Your Gun

=== Music video ===
Best Short Form Music Video

- "Freak on a Leash" – Korn
  - Terry Fitzgerald, Bart Lipton (video producers); Graham Morris, Todd McFarlane, Jonathan Dayton and Valerie Faris (video directors)
- "All Is Full of Love" – Björk
  - Cindy Burnay (video producer); Chris Cunningham (video director)
- "Everything Is Everything" – Lauryn Hill
  - John Oloen (video producer); Sanji (director)
- "Back at One" – Brian McKnight
  - Heather Jansson (video producer); Francis Lawrence (director)
- "Unpretty" – TLC
  - Kati Haberstock (video producer); Paul Hunter (director)

Best Long Form Music Video

- Band of Gypsies - Live at Fillmore East – Jimi Hendrix
  - Chips Chipperfield & Neil Aspinall (video producers), Bob Smeaton (video director)

=== Packaging and notes ===
- Best Recording Package
  - Buddy Jackson, Ray Benson & Sally Carns (art directors) for Ride With Bob performed by Asleep at the Wheel
- Best Boxed Recording Package
  - Arnold Levine & Ron Jaramillo (art directors) for Miles Davis - The Complete Bitches Brew Sessions performed by Miles Davis
- Best Album Notes
  - Bob Blumenthal (notes writer) for John Coltrane - The Classic Quartet: Complete Impulse! Studio Recordings performed by John Coltrane

=== Polka ===
- Best Polka Album
  - Polkasonic - Brave Combo

=== Production and engineering ===
- Best Engineered Album, Non-Classical
  - Al Schmitt (engineer) for When I Look in Your Eyes performed by Diana Krall
- Best Engineered Album, Classical
  - Markus Heiland (engineer), Michael Tilson Thomas (conductor), the Peninsula Boys Choir, the San Francisco Girl's Chorus & the San Francisco Symphony Orchestra & Chorus for Stravinsky: Firebird; The Rite of Spring; Perséphone
- Producer of the Year, Non-Classical
  - Walter Afanasieff
- Producer of the Year, Classical
  - Adam Abeshouse
- Remixer of the Year, Non-Classical
  - Club 69 (Peter Rauhofer)

=== Reggae ===
Best Reggae Album

- Calling Rastafari - Burning Spear
- Roots Revival - Aswad
- The Doctor - Beenie Man
- Living Legacy - Steel Pulse
- Generation Coming - Third World

=== Spoken ===
- Best Spoken Word Album
  - LeVar Burton for The Autobiography of Martin Luther King, Jr.
- Best Spoken Comedy Album
  - Chris Rock for Bigger & Blacker

=== World ===
Best World Music Album

- Livro - Caetano Veloso

== Special merit awards ==
=== Grammy Hall of Fame Award ===
- "Amazing Grace" The Dixie Hummingbirds Apollo 1946 Gospel Single
- The Beatles (aka "The White Album") The Beatles Apple 1968 Pop rock Album
- Bells Are Ringing Original Broadway cast (Judy Holliday, Sydney Chaplin) Columbia 1956 Musical Show Album
- "Boogie Woogie Bugle Boy" The Andrews Sisters Decca 1941 Jump Blues Single
- "A Change Is Gonna Come" Sam Cooke RCA Victor 1964 R&B Single
- "Cheek to Cheek" Fred Astaire with Leo Reisman and His Orchestra Brunswick 1935 Soundtrack Single
- "Chega de Saudade" João Gilberto Odeon 1958 Bossa Nova Single
- Conversations with Myself Bill Evans Verve 1963 Jazz Album
- Copland: Appalachian Spring Boston Symphony Orchestra conducted by Aaron Copland RCA Victor 1959 Classical Album
- "Desafinado" Stan Getz and Charlie Byrd Verve 1962 Bossa Nova Single
- Desperado Eagles Asylum 1973 Rock Album
- "Don't Make Me Over" Dionne Warwick Scepter 1962 Pop Single
- "Early Autumn" Woody Herman & his Orchestra Capitol 1949 Jazz Single
- Ella Fitzgerald Sings the Cole Porter Song Book Ella Fitzgerald Verve 1956 Jazz Album
- "For What It's Worth" Buffalo Springfield Atco 1967 Rock Single
- "Frenesi" Artie Shaw & his Orchestra Victor 1940 Jazz Single
- "The Girl from Ipanema" Stan Getz and Astrud Gilberto Verve 1964 Bossa nova Single
- "Groovin' High" Dizzy Gillespie & His Sextet, Guild, 1946 Jazz Single
- A Hard Day's Night The Beatles United Artists 1964 Soundtrack Album
- "Hello Walls" Faron Young Capitol 1961 Country Single
- "I Loves You, Porgy" Nina Simone Bethlehem 1958 Jazz Single
- "I'm Moving On" Hank Snow RCA Victor 1950 Country Single
- The King and I Original Broadway Cast Recording Cast: Yul Brynner, Gertrude Lawrence, Dorothy Sarnoff, Doretta Morrow, Larry Douglas, Sandy Kennedy, etc. Decca 1951 Musical show Album
- "La Bamba (song)" Ritchie Valens Del-Fi 1958 Rock & roll Single
- Lady in Satin Billie Holiday Columbia 1958 Jazz Album
- Layla and Other Assorted Love Songs Derek and the Dominos Atco 1970 Blues rock Album
- "Lush Life" John Coltrane & Johnny Hartman Impulse 1963 Jazz Single
- "Mustang Sally" Wilson Pickett Atlantic 1967 R&B Single
- "My Way" Frank Sinatra Reprise 1969 Traditional pop Single
- A Night at Birdland Vol. 1, A Night at Birdland Vol. 2, A Night at Birdland Vol. 3 Art Blakey & his Quintet Blue Note 1954 Jazz Album
- "Nuages" Django Reinhardt and Stéphane Grappelli with the Quintet of the Hot Club of France Decca 1946 Jazz Single
- "Pistol Packin' Mama" Al Dexter Okeh 1943 Country Single
- Porgy and Bess Miles Davis Columbia 1959 Third stream jazz Album
- "Puccini": La bohème Cast: Victoria de los Angeles, Lucine Amara, Jussi Bjorling, Robert Merrill, Giorgio Tozzi, John Reardon, etc. (with Orchestra & Chorus conducted by Thomas Beecham) RCA Victor 1956 Opera Album
- "Purple Haze" The Jimi Hendrix Experience Track 1967 Rock Single
- "Rollin' Stone" Muddy Waters Chess 1950 Electric Blues Single
- Rubber Soul The Beatles Capitol 1965 Folk Rock Album
- The Sidewinder Lee Morgan Blue Note 1964 Jazz Album
- Songs for Swingin' Lovers! Frank Sinatra Capitol 1956 Traditional pop Album
- "Stormy Weather" Lena Horne RCA Victor 1941 Traditional pop Single
- "Stravinsky": Petrouchka: Le Sacre du Printemps Igor Stravinsky cond. Columbia Symphony Orchestra (plus spoken reminiscing apropos of Le Sacre) Columbia 1960 Classical Album
- Sweetheart of the Rodeo The Byrds Columbia 1968 Country Rock Album
- "Theme from A Summer Place" Percy Faith and his Orchestra Columbia 1959 Easy listening Single
- "(They Long to Be) Close to You" The Carpenters A&M 1970 Pop Single
- "The Twist" Chubby Checker Parkway 1960 Rock & roll Single
- "Unchained Melody" The Righteous Brothers Verve 1965 Blue-eyed Soul Single
- "Unforgettable" Nat "King" Cole Capitol 1951 Traditional pop Single
- "What'd I Say (Part I)" Ray Charles Atlantic 1959 R&B Single
- "Wichita Lineman" Glen Campbell Capitol 1968 Country Single

=== Grammy Lifetime Achievement Award ===
- Harry Belafonte
- Woody Guthrie
- John Lee Hooker
- Mitch Miller
- Willie Nelson

=== Grammy Trustees Award ===
- Clive Davis
- Phil Spector

=== MusiCares Person of the Year ===
- Elton John

=== Technical Grammy Award ===
- Bill Putnam
- AMS Neve

== The 42nd GRAMMY LOGO ==
The design of the 42nd GRAMMY AWARDS logo, was commissioned to Mark Deitch and Associates. The actual design was conceived and executed by Raoul Pascual of WYNK Marketing. Michael Green of the Recording Academy stipulated that the logo should encompass all forms of musical genre and (whatever the design) the GRAMMY logo had to be prominently featured. Raoul's concept was to represent music with some of its major instruments: the clarinet for woodwinds, the piano for percussion, the guitar for strings plus a microphone:

"I imagined all the instruments emanating from behind the logo. My problem was how to translate that into a visual. I designed black and white icons of the instruments using a vector program. I was working overtime and I was getting desperate. I was moving the different icons around the GRAMMY logo but none of the combinations seemed to work. As I picked up the guitar icon, I decided to pray and make a deal with God. I said 'if you bless me with a winning design, I will give you the glory every time I share how I designed the GRAMMY logo.' Suddenly, I inadvertently released my hold of the icon and it fell on top of the GRAMMY logo. I stared at the image on my screen and I saw my solution. I added the other icons and curved them to suggest movement from behind. Eureka! That was it!"

With suggestions from the staff and the people at the Recording Academy in the course of several weeks, the design underwent an evolution from a 2 dimensional rendering into 3D.

== Fashion ==
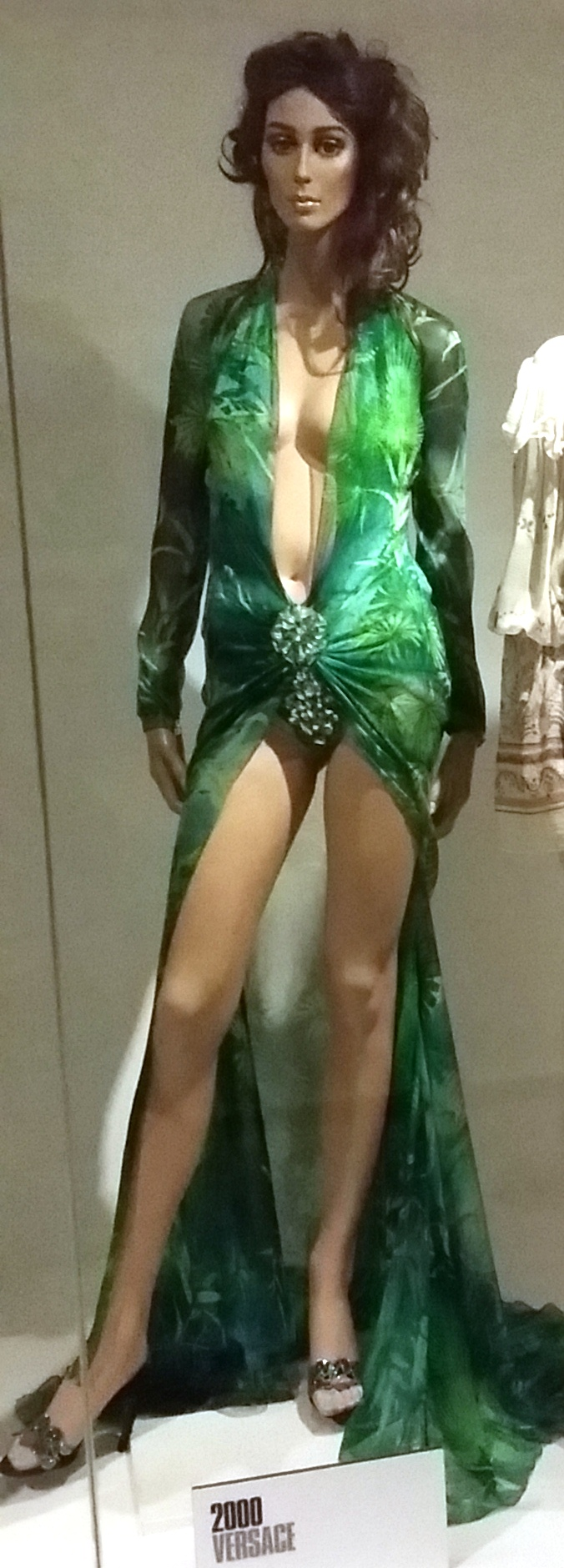
A silk chiffon dress identical to that worn by Jennifer Lopez to the 42nd Annual Grammys, this version exhibited at the Fashion Museum, Bath, as part of their Dress of the Year Collection.

In January 2015, Google's president Eric Schmidt cited the massive attention to the dress Jennifer Lopez wore to the 42nd Annual Grammy Awards as the motivation for the creation of Google Images search in 2001. In 2000, Google Search results were limited to simple pages of text with links, but the developers worked on developing this further, realizing that an image search was required to answer "the most popular search query" they had seen to date: Jennifer Lopez's green dress.

Designed by Donatella Versace, the dress has been described as "jungle green", "sea green" or "tropical" green, a green dress with touches of blue to give an exotic appearance. It is a see-through silk chiffon dress with a tropical leaf and bamboo pattern, with a citrine-studded crotch. The dress "had a low-cut neck that extended several inches below [the] navel, where it was loosely fastened with a sparkly brooch and then opened out again," exposing Lopez’s midriff and then cut along the front of the legs like a bath robe. The dress then drooped behind her on the floor, open at the back.
