= Meditations on Rilke =

Song cycle by Michael Tilson Thomas

Meditations on Rilke is a song cycle for mezzo-soprano, bass-baritone, and orchestra written in 2019 by the American composer and conductor Michael Tilson Thomas and set to the poetry of Rainer Maria Rilke. Its world premiere was given by the mezzo-soprano Sasha Cooke, the bass-baritone Ryan McKinny, and San Francisco Symphony conducted by Thomas at the Louise M. Davies Symphony Hall in San Francisco on January 9, 2020.

== Composition ==
=== Background ===
While composing Meditations on Rilke, Thomas was inspired by a story about his father, who took a job playing piano for hire in a bar just outside of Oatman, Arizona, in the 1920s. He would perform not only popular tunes of the era, but often the music of such composers as Franz Schubert, Gustav Mahler, and Alban Berg. In the score program note, Thomas wrote, "My dad, who could play any Gershwin, Berlin, swing, rhumba, whatever number, asked for the job. 'Just so long as you can play our music,' said the guy behind the counter." The music thus contains stylistic references to Schubert, Mahler, and Berg in additional other popular music styles that have informed the taste of Thomas and his forefathers. The composer continued, "For my father, my grandfather, and even my great-grandfather music was a kind of lifelong journal, or confessional companion, into which new entries were always being added. It is much the same for me. In composing these Meditations on Rilke, whose poems are so varied in mood and character, my own lifelong 'musical journal' was a lens through which to view and express this poetry."

=== Structure ===
Meditations on Rilke has a duration of roughly 40 minutes and is cast in six movements set to a different poem by Rilke:

1. "Herbsttag" ("Autumn Day")
2. "Ich lebe mein Leben in wachsenden Ringen" ("I live my life in growing orbits")
3. "Das Lied des Trinkers" ("The Song the Drunkard Sings")
4. "Immer wieder" ("Again, Again")
5. "Imaginärer Lebenslauf" ("Imaginary Biography")
6. "Herbst" ("Autumn")

=== Instrumentation ===
The work is scored for mezzo-soprano, bass-baritone, and an orchestra consisting of two flutes (2nd doubling piccolo), two oboes (2nd doubling Cor anglais), clarinet, E-flat clarinet, bass clarinet, two bassoons (2nd doubling contrabassoon), two horns, two trumpets, two trombones, timpani, percussion, piano, celesta, harp, and strings.

== Reception ==
Reviewing the world premiere, Joshua Kosman of the San Francisco Chronicle particularly praised the fourth and sixth movement, despite noting that the Berg influence of the first and last songs "struggled to make an effect." He wrote, "The populist frankness that results in some of the songs can at times sit uneasily with Rilke's fragrant, distinctively German prosody. [...] But when Thomas puts his own distinctive spin on the material, the results are invigorating." He added that "there are other treasures scattered throughout the cycle — the crystalline text-setting of the second song, or the inventive orchestral textures that adorn most of the songs as preludes and postludes."

Mark Swed of the Los Angeles Times described the songs as "wistful reflections on life and death" and wrote, "What Rilke [...] accomplishes in his poems, and what Tilson Thomas further improves upon theatrically and with no small debt to show business, is the transformation of alienation into amazement. These are somber songs. They look back — in one an imaginary life journey is from unselfconscious joy to a gasping for the breath of that early clear air (and this written just months before the pandemic!)." Likewise, Zachary Lewis of The Plain Dealer said that "the approach suited the text. Wielding multiple styles and textures ranging from spare to sumptuous, Tilson Thomas distilled the aura of each poem, precisely capturing not only its imagery and dramatic shape but also the emotional sense of melancholy, awe, faith, or dread at its core." He concluded, "Meditations has a good shot at a long life."
