= Ragazzi Boys Chorus =

The Ragazzi Boys Chorus
- Choir
- Origin: San Mateo, California, United States
- Founded: 1987
- Founder: Joyce Keil
- Genre: Choral, classical, opera
- Notable members: Julia Simon; Colston Rienhoff; Peter O'Shea; John Sullivan; Diane Doron; Craig Morey; Ross Acker; Minh Tai
- Leadership: Artistic and Executive Director; Kent Jue; Chorus Directors; Travis Rogers; Kaori Nakano; John Collaros; Nancy Whitecar; Nathan Wilen; Brendan Lodge; Theory Director; Joey Krohlow; Collaborative Pianists; Peter Bassford; Yuxin Dai; Yongyu Gao; Akane Ota; Dace Samta; Marilyn Wells
- Associated groups: San Francisco Opera; San Francisco Symphony
- Website: ragazzi.org

The Ragazzi Boys Chorus is a boys' and young men's chorus in the San Francisco Bay Area. The chorus was formed in 1987 with six boys, and it now includes more than 250 singers from 100 schools, including the counties of San Mateo, Santa Clara and Santa Cruz. The chorus participated in the San Francisco Symphony's recording of Perséphone, which was included in the Symphony's album that won a Grammy Award for Best Classical Album in 2000.

Since its founding, Ragazzi Boys Chorus has performed regularly with the San Francisco Opera, San Francisco Symphony, Opera San Jose, West Bay Opera, Lawrence Pech Dance Company, Peninsula Symphony, Masterworks Chorale and the Stanford University Symphonic Chorus, among others. In June 2022, Ragazzi completed a workshop with the Vienna Boys' Choir.

== Tours ==
Ragazzi Boys Chorus regularly tours in the United States and abroad. Ragazzi has toured internationally in Canada (1990), Russia (1992), Eastern Europe (1995), Italy (1998), Japan (1999), the British Isles (2001), Spain and Portugal (2004), and Australia and New Zealand (2007). In the summer of 2008, Ragazzi Boys Chorus was chosen to participate in the Kathaumixw Festival in British Columbia. In the summer of 2010, the choir travelled to Canada, where they participated in the yearly jazz festival. They also went to Cuba in 2011 and Los Angeles, California, in the summer of 2012. They went to Seoul, South Korea, and participated in the World Vision 2013 International Children's Choir Festival.

Domestically, Ragazzi Boys Chorus has toured Minnesota, where they attended AMERICAFEST (2003); Oregon, where they attended PICCFEST (2005) as a featured choir; Montana, where they attended the International Choral Festival (2006) and Arizona (2009).

In July 2009 Ragazzi Boys Chorus' Young Men's Ensemble (YME) toured the San Francisco East Bay, attending the Golden Gate International Children's Choral Festival.

== Discography ==
- Good News! (1996) [Live Performance]
- A Holiday Collection (1998)
- San Francisco Symphony / Michael Tilson Thomas - Igor Stravinsky: Perséphone (2000)
- Canciones de Alabanza (2001)
- Magnificat My Spirit Rejoices (2006)
- Splendors of the Italian Baroque (2009)
- I Dream a World (2016)

== Levels ==
Boys first join Ragazzi Boys Chorus in one of the Primary groups. From there, they are promoted to Ragazzi Premiere. After spending one or more years in Premiere, the boys advance to Avanti, a training group for Concert Group. After the boys learn 5 Standard Repertoire pieces and have finished the Monarch Theory Program, they can be promoted to Concert Group, which is the highest level for unchanged voices. After the boys' voices have changed, they can move on to the Young Men's Ensemble. A select group of the Young Men's Ensemble are chosen every year to be part of the Choral Scholars, where they sing SATB music with Concert Group.
