= Michael Tilson Thomas =

American conductor, composer and pianist (1944–2026)

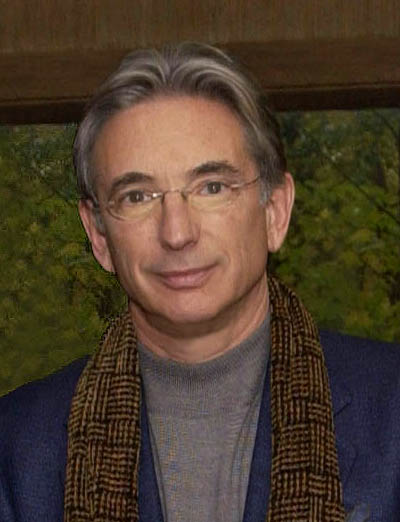
- Thomas in 2008
- Born: December 21, 1944; Los Angeles, California, U.S.
- Died: April 22, 2026 (aged 81); San Francisco, California, U.S.
- Occupations: Conductor; Composer; Pianist; Music pedagogue
- Organizations: Buffalo Philharmonic Orchestra; New World Symphony; London Symphony Orchestra; San Francisco Symphony
- Spouse: Joshua Robison (m. 2014; died 2026)
- Awards: Grammy Awards; Peabody Award; National Medal of Arts; Kennedy Center Honor
- Website: michaeltilsonthomas.com

Michael Tilson Thomas (December 21, 1944 – April 22, 2026) was an American conductor, composer, pianist and music pedagogue. He was music director of the Buffalo Philharmonic Orchestra from 1971 to 1979. He founded the New World Symphony, an American orchestral academy in Miami Beach, Florida, in 1987, serving as artistic director until 2022 and then as artistic director laureate. Thomas was principal conductor of the London Symphony Orchestra from 1988 to 1995, and then music director of the San Francisco Symphony until 2020. He conducted a wide repertoire of music, with a focus on the works by Gustav Mahler and of contemporary American music; he was the first to record some works by Aaron Copland, Charles Ives, and Steve Reich. Thomas appeared on television in the Young People's Concerts with the New York Philharmonic and hosted the Keeping Score series. He collaborated with popular artists including Elvis Costello and Metallica.

His compositions include From the Diary of Anne Frank (1990), Shówa/Shoáh (1995) for the 50th anniversary of the bombing of Hiroshima, Poems of Emily Dickinson (2002), and Meditations on Rilke (2019). He was the subject of the American Masters documentary Michael Tilson Thomas: Where Now Is.

== Life and career ==
Thomas was born on December 21, 1944, in Los Angeles, California, to Ted and Roberta (Meritzer) Thomas, a Broadway stage manager and a middle school history teacher, respectively. He was the grandson of Yiddish theater stars Boris and Bessie Thomashefsky, who performed in the Yiddish Theater District in Manhattan. The family talent goes back to Thomas's great-grandfather, Pincus, an actor and playwright, and before that to a long line of cantors; his father, Theodor Herzl Tomashefsky (Ted Thomas), was also a poet and painter.

He was an only child and musical prodigy. Thomas studied piano with John Crown and composition and conducting with Ingolf Dahl at the University of Southern California, where he graduated from the USC Thornton School of Music '67 and MM '76. As a student of Friedelind Wagner, Thomas was a musical assistant and assistant conductor at the Bayreuth Festival. As a young man, he was driving and heard music "so powerful [he] pulled over to the side of the road." It was James Brown singing "Cold Sweat". He credited Brown with influencing his sense of rhythm.

=== Boston, Buffalo, New York, and Los Angeles ===
From 1968 to 1994, Thomas was the music director of the Ojai Music Festival seven times. After winning the Koussevitzky Prize at Tanglewood in 1969, he was named assistant conductor of the Boston Symphony Orchestra. That same year, he made his conducting debut with the orchestra, replacing an unwell William Steinberg mid-concert and thereby coming to international recognition at the age of 24. He stayed with the Boston Symphony as principal guest conductor until 1974 and made several recordings with the orchestra for Deutsche Grammophon. He was music director of the Buffalo Philharmonic Orchestra from 1971 to 1979, and recorded for Columbia Records with the orchestra.

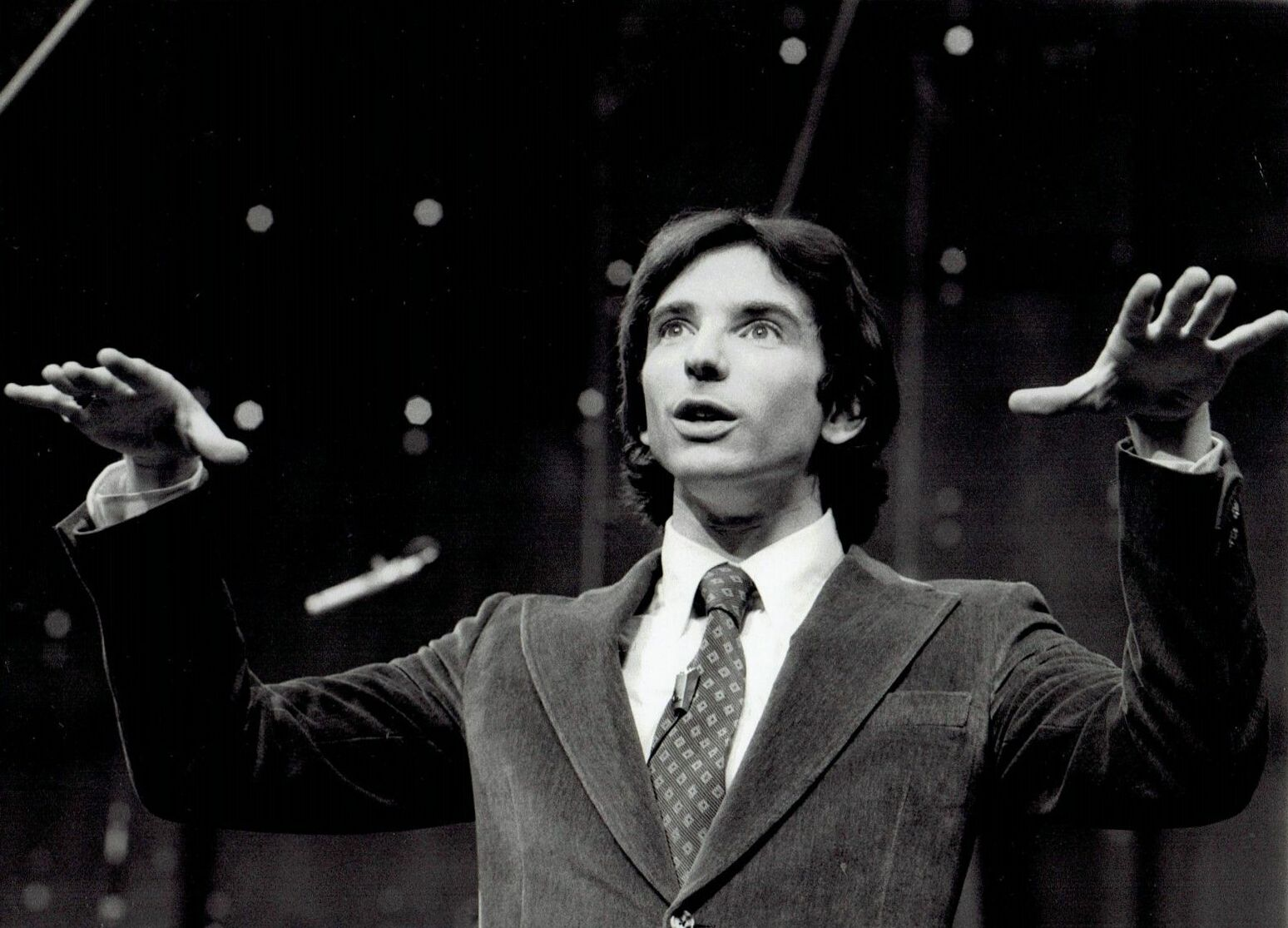
Thomas conducting the New York Philharmonic Young People's Concert, 1977.

Between 1971 and 1977, Thomas also conducted the series of Young People's Concerts with the New York Philharmonic as well as the Young Musicians Foundation Debut Orchestra based in Los Angeles. From 1981 to 1985, he was principal guest conductor of the Los Angeles Philharmonic Orchestra. During a 1985 performance of Mahler's Eighth Symphony at the Hollywood Bowl, a police helicopter flew over the venue, disrupting the concert. Thomas temporarily left the stage. In 2007, he returned to the Hollywood Bowl, leading the Los Angeles Philharmonic again in the Mahler Eighth, asking jokingly, "Now where were we?"

=== New World Symphony ===
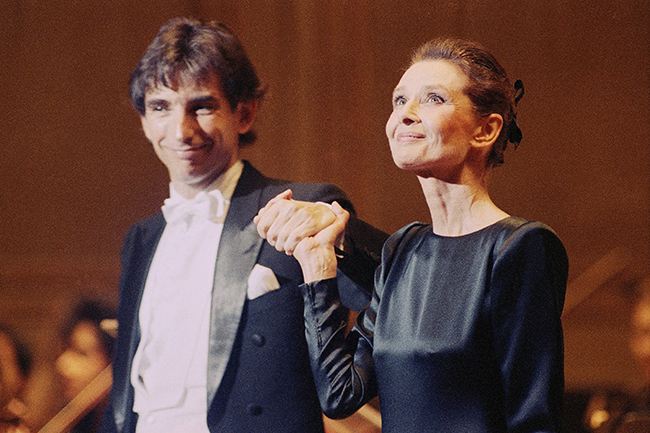
Tilson Thomas with Audrey Hepburn in 1990

In 1987, Thomas founded the New World Symphony in Miami Beach, Florida, an orchestral academy for young musicians whose stated mission is "to prepare highly-gifted graduates of distinguished music programs for leadership roles in orchestras and ensembles around the world". He played an instrumental role in the development of the Frank Gehry-designed New World Center in Miami Beach, which opened in 2011, and maintained a relationship with the organization as Artistic Director Laureate. (The two had personal history: Gehry sometimes babysat for Thomas when both were growing up in Los Angeles.) In March 2022, Thomas announced that he would stand down as artistic director of the New World Symphony as of June 1, 2022.

=== London ===
From 1988 to 1995, Thomas was principal conductor of the London Symphony Orchestra (LSO) and recorded with them for such labels as Columbia (now Sony Classical), including Mahler's Symphony No. 3. From 1995, he held the title of principal guest conductor of the LSO, and became conductor laureate in 2016.

=== San Francisco ===
Thomas became the San Francisco Symphony's 11th music director in 1995. He made his debut with the orchestra in January 1974 conducting Mahler's Symphony No. 9. During his first season with the San Francisco Symphony, Thomas included a work by an American composer on nearly every one of his programs, including the first performances ever by the orchestra of music by Lou Harrison, and culminated with "An American Festival", a two-week focus on American music. During his tenure, the orchestra began to issue recordings on its own SFS Media label. He conducted Elvis Costello's Il Sogno.

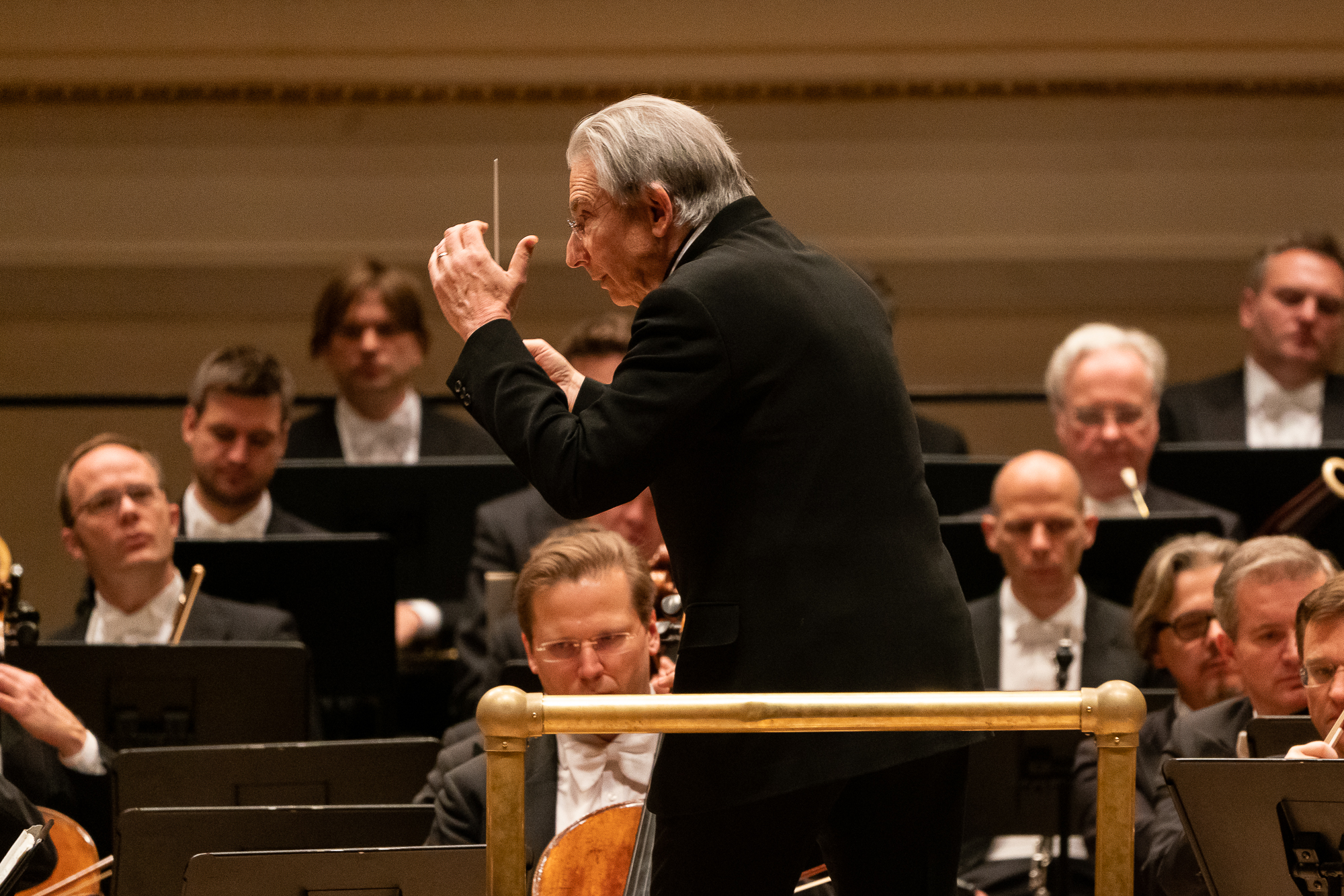
Thomas conducting Mahler's Ninth at Carnegie Hall, 2019

In April 2005, he conducted the Carnegie Hall premiere of The Thomashefskys: Music and Memories of a Life in the Yiddish Theater, partly as a tribute to his own grandparents. Other American orchestras have since performed this production, including the Chicago Symphony Orchestra, Los Angeles Philharmonic, Boston Symphony Orchestra, Philadelphia Orchestra, New York Philharmonic, New World Symphony, and San Francisco Symphony. It has also been recorded for future broadcast on PBS.

Thomas collaborated with YouTube in 2009 to help create the YouTube Symphony Orchestra, an orchestra whose members were selected from 30 countries based on more than 3,000 video auditions on YouTube. The orchestra, with soloists such as Mason Bates, Measha Brueggergosman, Joshua Roman, Gil Shaham, Yuja Wang, and Jess Larsen, participated in a classical music summit in New York City at the Juilliard School over three days. The event culminated in a live concert at Carnegie Hall on April 15. The concert was later made available on YouTube. On March 20, 2011, Thomas also conducted the "YTSO2" (YouTube Symphony Orchestra 2) in Sydney.

In October 2017, the orchestra announced that Thomas would conclude his tenure as its music director at the close of the 2019–2020 season, and subsequently take the title of music director laureate.

Thomas was featured on the 2020 album S&M2 with thrash metal band Metallica and the San Francisco Symphony. Thomas only conducted during the performance of "Scythian Suite, Opus 20 II: The Enemy God and the Dance of the Dark Spirits", "The Iron Foundry, Opus 19", and "The Unforgiven III", and then conducted "Enter Sandman" before moving to keyboards and leaving Edwin Outwater conducting the symphony orchestra.

Commemorative street sign "MTT Way"

In December 2023, a commemorative "MTT Way" street sign was unveiled at the corner of Grove Street and Van Ness Avenue, outside Davies Symphony Hall.

=== As educator ===
Thomas was also devoted to music education. He led a series of education programs titled Keeping Score which offers insight into the lives and works of great composers.. Beginning in November 2006, it featured a television series, three one-hour documentary-style episodes and two live-concert programs. He founded the New World Symphony in Miami in 1987. Thomas led the YouTube Symphony Orchestra, which brought young musicians from around the world together for a week of music making and learning for a first concert at Carnegie Hall in 2009.

Thomas served as president of the Tomashefsky Project, a $2 million undertaking formed in 2017 that is intended to record and preserve his grandparents' theatrical achievements, and was on the faculty of the University of Southern California Thornton School of Music.

Due to health concerns, Thomas announced on March 2, 2022, that he would be stepping down as the artistic director of the New World Symphony and instead serve as the artistic director laureate.

=== Personal life ===
Thomas lived in San Francisco. He married Joshua Robison on November 2, 2014. The two were together for 50 years, having first met as 11 and 12-year-olds in a junior high orchestra. Robison died on February 22, 2026, at the age of 79.

On August 6, 2021, Thomas disclosed publicly for the first time that he had been diagnosed with an aggressive form of brain cancer, called glioblastoma multiforme.

Thomas returned to his hometown on January 9, 2022, to conduct—for the first time since his cancer disclosure—the Los Angeles Philharmonic. Despite the small audience at Walt Disney Concert Hall due to more than 43,000 newly diagnosed cases of COVID-19 in Los Angeles County, Thomas was greeted warmly. He proceeded to lead a concert of works by Gabriel Fauré, Thomas's own Meditations on Rilke—wistful reflections on life and death as the composer turned 75 in 2019—and to conclude, a performance of Prokofiev's Fifth Symphony. In 2023, Thomas was featured in the American Masters documentary Michael Tilson Thomas: Where Now Is.

In February 2025, Thomas announced that his brain tumor had returned. His final public appearance was on April 26, 2025, when he conducted the San Francisco Symphony in a belated 80th birthday celebration concert.

Thomas died of the disease at his home in San Francisco on April 22, 2026, at the age of 81.

== Film and television ==
Thomas first appeared on television in the Young People's Concerts with the New York Philharmonic, airing from 1971 to 1977. He regularly appeared on PBS. Several episodes of WNET's Great Performances series featured him. He ran a series for the BBC with the London Symphony Orchestra.

In 1976, Thomas appeared alongside Bugs Bunny and Daffy Duck in a prime-time special, Bugs and Daffy's Carnival of the Animals, a combined live action/animated broadcast of The Carnival of the Animals by Saint-Saëns.

In 2011, he hosted a concert stage show celebrating his grandparents and the music of American Yiddish theatre The Thomashefskys: Music and Memories of a Life in the Yiddish Theater, which aired in 2012 on the PBS series Great Performances.

Thomas hosted the Keeping Score television series, nine one-hour documentary-style episodes and eight live-concert programs, which began airing nationally on PBS stations in early November 2006. He and the San Francisco Symphony have examined the lives and music of Gustav Mahler, Dmitri Shostakovich, Charles Ives, Hector Berlioz, Aaron Copland, Igor Stravinsky, Peter Ilyich Tchaikovsky, and Ludwig van Beethoven.

Keeping Score discography

- Tchaikovsky's Fourth Symphony – 2004
- Beethoven's Eroica – 2006
- Copland and the American Sound – 2006
- Stravinsky's The Rite of Spring – 2006
- Berlioz's Symphonie fantastique – 2009
- Shostakovich's Symphony No. 5 – 2009
- Ives's Holiday Symphony – 2009
- Mahler: Origins and Legacy – 2011

== Recordings ==
Thomas recorded extensively for labels including Columbia, Sony, Deutsche Grammophon (DG), Argo and RCA. His discography includes works by Bach, Beethoven, Prokofiev and Stravinsky as well as his pioneering work with the music of Charles Ives, Carl Ruggles, Steve Reich, John Cage, Ingolf Dahl, Morton Feldman, George Gershwin, John McLaughlin, and Elvis Costello. He was renowned for his interpretation of Mahler's music, recording all nine symphonies and other major orchestral works with the San Francisco Symphony. These recordings have been released on the high-fidelity audio format Super Audio CD on the San Francisco Symphony's own recording label.

His recordings include:

Year	Orchestra	Composer	Work (and soloists, if any)	Label
1991	London Symphony Orchestra	Adam	Music from Giselle OCLC 1335674955	Sony
1990	London Symphony Orchestra, Ambrosian Singers	Beethoven	Late Choral Music OCLC 913823393	CBS Masterworks
1986	Orchestra of St. Luke's	Beethoven	Symphony No. 3 Contredanses, WoO 14 OCLC 1548593458	CBS Masterworks
2010	San Francisco Symphony	Beethoven	Symphony No. 5 Piano Concerto No. 4 (Emanuel Ax) OCLC 873571690	SFS Media
1999	English Chamber Orchestra	Beethoven	Symphony No. 6 "Pastorale" OCLC 643939737	Sony Classical
1996	London Symphony Orchestra	Bernstein	Arias and Barcarolles (Von Stade, Hampson), Suite from A Quiet Place and Symphonic Dances from West Side Story. OCLC 979418653	DG
1993	London Symphony Orchestra, London Voices	Bernstein	On the Town (Daly, von Stade, Lear, Laine, McLaughlin, Hampson, Garrison, Ollmann, Ramey)OCLC 249153348	DG
1991	London Symphony Orchestra	Brahms	Serenade No. 1 Tragic Overture; Academic Festival Overture OCLC 906155931	Sony Classical
1992	London Symphony Orchestra	Brahms	Serenade No. 2 / Haydn Variations / Hungarian Dances OCLC 1554311498	Sony Classical
2002		Cage; Stravinsky; Reich	Three Dances; The Rite of Spring; Four Organs OCLC 731618798	Angel Records
1996	San Francisco Symphony	Copland	Piano Concerto; Orchestra Variations; Short Symphony; Symphonic Ode (with Garrick Ohlsson) OCLC 1523072164	RCA Victor Red Seal
1972	Boston Symphony Orchestra	Debussy	Images; Prélude à l'après-midi d'un faune OCLC 1501619271	DG
1993	London Symphony Orchestra and Chorus	Debussy	Le Martyre de saint Sébastien (with McNair, Murray, Stutzman, Caron) OCLC 1548673108	Sony Classical
2007	Boston Symphony Orchestra Chamber Players	Debussy	Cello Sonata (Eskin, Thomas); Sonata for Flute, Viola and Harp (Dwyer, Fine, Hobson); Violin Sonata (Silverstein, Thomas)OCLC 1501620269	DG
1999	New World Symphony	Feldman	Coptic Light (Cohen, Feinberg)	Argo
1976	Columbia Jazz Band, New York Philharmonic	Gershwin	Rhapsody in Blue (composer, piano roll); An American in Paris	Columbia
1990	Los Angeles Philharmonic Orchestra	Gershwin	Gershwin Live! (Sarah Vaughan, Thomas)	Sony Classical
1984	Los Angeles Philharmonic Orchestra	Gershwin	Rhapsody in Blue (Thomas); Second Rhapsody; Preludes for Piano Promenade; Unpublished Piano Works	Columbia
1970	Boston Symphony Orchestra	Ives; Ruggles; Piston	Three Places in New England; Sun-treader; Symphony No. 2	DG
1991	Chicago Symphony Orchestra	Ives	Symphonies Nos. 1 & 4	Sony Classical
2002	San Francisco Symphony	Ives	An American Journey	RCA Victor Red Seal
1990	Chicago Symphony Orchestra and Chorus	Ives	Holiday Symphony; The Unanswered Question (Herseth); Central Park in the Dark	Sony Classical
1992	London Symphony Orchestra and Chorus	Janáček	Glagolitic Mass (Benackova, Palmer, Lakes, Kotscherga); Sinfonietta	Sony Classical
1974	London Symphony Orchestra	Mahavishnu	Apocalypse (Mahavishnu Orchestra)	Sony Classical
2004	San Francisco Symphony	Mahler	Symphony No. 1	SFS Media
2004	San Francisco Symphony and Chorus	Mahler	Symphony No. 2	SFS Media
2004	San Francisco Symphony and Chorus, Pacific Boychoir, San Francisco Symphony Girls Chorus	Mahler	Symphony No. 3 Kindertotenlieder (DeYoung)	SFS Media
2004	San Francisco Symphony	Mahler	Symphony No. 4 (Claycomb)	SFS Media
2004	San Francisco Symphony	Mahler	Symphony No. 5	SFS Media
2004	San Francisco Symphony	Mahler	Symphony No. 6	SFS Media
2005	San Francisco Symphony	Mahler	Symphony No. 7	SFS Media
2009	San Francisco Symphony and Chorus, Pacific Boychoir; San Francisco Girls Chorus	Mahler	Symphony No. 8	SFS Media
2005	San Francisco Symphony	Mahler	Symphony No. 9	SFS Media
2008	San Francisco Symphony	Mahler	Das klagende Lied (Shaguch, DeYoung, Moser, Lieferkus); Das Lied von der Erde (Skelton, Hampson)	RCA Red Seal
1990	London Symphony Orchestra and Chorus, South End Boys	Mahler	Symphony No. 3 Rückert Lieder (Baker)	Sony Classical
1999	London Symphony Orchestra	Mahler	Symphony No. 7	RCA Victor Red Seal
2010	San Francisco Symphony	Mahler	Songs with Orchestra (Graham, Hampson)	SFS Media
1998	New World Symphony	New World Jazz	New World Jazz	RCA Victor Red Seal
1997	London Symphony Orchestra	Prokofiev	Symphonies Nos. 1 & 5	Sony Classical
2004	San Francisco Symphony	Prokofiev	Romeo and Juliet	RCA Red Seal
1991	Hungarian State Orchestra	Puccini	Tosca (Éva Marton, José Carreras, Pons, Tajo)	Sony Classical
1989	London Symphony Orchestra	Ravel	Ma mère l'Oye; Boléro; Pavane pour une infante défunte Pièce en forme de Habañera; L'Éventail de Jeanne; Fanfare	Sony Classical
1990	Colorado Quartet, Brooklyn Philharmonic Orchestra	Reich	The Desert Music	Nonesuch
1994	London Symphony Orchestra	Reich	The Three movements	Nonesuch
1980	Buffalo Philharmonic	Ruggles	Complete Music of Carl Ruggles	Columbia
1971	Boston Symphony Orchestra	Schumann; Piston	Violin Concerto (Paul Zukofsky); Symphony No. 2	DG
1986	London Symphony Orchestra	Strauss, R.	Ein Heldenleben; Till Eulenspiegels Lustige Streiche	Columbia
1972	Boston Symphony Orchestra	Stravinsky	Le sacre du printemps Le roi des etoiles	DG
1997	London Symphony Orchestra	Stravinsky	Stravinsky in America	Sony Classical
1999	San Francisco Symphony, San Francisco Symphony Chorus, San Francisco Girls Chorus, Ragazzi, the Peninsula Boys Chorus	Stravinsky	Le sacre du printemps L'oiseau de feu Perséphone	RCA Victor Red Seal
1993	New World Symphony	Tangazo	Tangazo	Argo
1970	Boston Symphony Orchestra	Tchaikovsky	Symphony No. 1	DG
1990	Philharmonia Orchestra	Tchaikovsky	Suite No. 2 Suite No. 4	Sony Classical
2005	Berliner Philharmoniker	Tchaikovsky	Violin Concerto (Joshua Bell); Méditation No. 1: Souvenir d'un lieucher Swan Lake: Danse russe	RCA Red Seal
1997	New World Symphony, BBC Singers	Villa Lobos	Bachianas Brasileiras Nos. 4 & 5 (Fleming); Bachianas Brasileiras No. 9 Chôros No. 5 & 10	RCA Victor Red Seal
1990	London Symphony Orchestra	Weill	The Seven Deadly Sins (Julia Migenes); The Threepenny Opera	Sony Classical
2013	London Symphony Orchestra	Saint-Saëns	Cello Concertos No. 1 & 2 (Steven Isserlis)	RCA Red Seal
1974	Studio cast	Stanley Silverman, Richard Foreman	Elephant Steps—A Fearful Radio Show (pop-opera)	Columbia

== Composition ==
Thomas's compositions include From the Diary of Anne Frank (1990), Shówa/Shoáh (1995, memorializing the fiftieth anniversary of the bombing of Hiroshima), Poems of Emily Dickinson (2002), and Urban Legend (2002).

=== Orchestra ===
- From the Diary of Anne Frank (1990) for narrator and orchestra
- Shówa/Shoáh (1995)
- Agnegram (1998)
- Whitman Songs (1999) for vocal baritone and orchestra
- Poems of Emily Dickinson (2002) for vocal soprano and orchestra
- Urban Legend (2002) for contrabassoon or baritone saxophone and orchestra
- Four Preludes on Playthings of the Wind (2016) for mezzo-soprano, 2 female back-up singers, chamber orchestra, and bar band
- Meditations on Rilke (2019) for mezzo-soprano, baritone, and orchestra

=== Chamber ensemble ===
- Street Song for Symphonic Brass (1988) for 3 C trumpets, B-flat flugelhorn, 4 horns in F, 2 trombones, bass trombone, and tuba
- Street Song for Brass Quintet (1988) for brass quintet
- Five Songs (1988) for vocal baritone and piano
- Grace (1993) for vocal soprano
- Fame, from Poems of Emily Dickinson (2001)
- Island Music (2003) for 2 solo marimba, 2 tutti marimba, and 2 percussion
- Notturno (2005) for flute and string quintet + harp (also available for flute and piano)
- Stay Together (2006) for electronics

== Awards ==
Grammy Award for Best Classical Compendium

- 2021 Conducting San Francisco Symphony, performing From the Diary of Anne Frank & Meditations on Rilke

Grammy Award for Best Orchestral Performance

- 2013 Conducting San Francisco Symphony, performing Adams: Harmonielehre & Short Ride in a Fast Machine
- 2006 Conducting San Francisco Symphony, performing Mahler: Symphony No. 7.
- 2003 Conducting the San Francisco Symphony, performing Mahler: Symphony No. 6.
- 2000 Conducting the Ragazzi, the Peninsula Boys Chorus, the San Francisco Girls Chorus, the San Francisco Symphony and Chorus, performing Stravinsky: The Firebird; The Rite of Spring; Perséphone.
- 1997 Conducting the San Francisco Symphony, performing Prokofiev: Romeo and Juliet (scenes).

Grammy Award for Best Classical Album

- 2010 Conducting San Francisco Symphony, performing Mahler: Symphony No. 8.
- 2006 Conducting San Francisco Symphony, performing Mahler: Symphony No. 7.
- 2004 Conducting San Francisco Symphony, performing Mahler: Symphony No. 3, Kindertotenlieder.
- 2000 Conducting the Ragazzi, the Peninsula Boy Chorus, the San Francisco Girls Chorus, the San Francisco Symphony and Chorus, performing Stravinsky: The Firebird; The Rite of Spring; Perséphone.

Grammy Award for Best Choral Performance

- 2010 Conducting San Francisco Symphony, performing Mahler: Symphony No. 8.
- 1976 Conducting the Cleveland Boys Choir, the Cleveland Orchestra and Cleveland Orchestra Chorus, performing Orff: Carmina Burana.

Peabody Award

- 2007 The MTT Files produced by Tom Voegeli and American Public Media.

National Medal of Arts

- 2009 National Medal of Arts.

Kennedy Center Honor

- 2019 Kennedy Center Honor was presented December 8, 2019.
