= Keeping Score (classical music) =

Program by San Francisco Symphony

Keeping Score was the San Francisco Symphony’s multi-year program designed to make classical music more accessible to people of all ages and musical backgrounds through television, the web, radio, DVDs, and in the classroom.

Keeping Score was anchored by a national PBS television series that debuted November 2, 2006; an interactive website, to explore and learn about music; a national radio series hosted by Michael Tilson Thomas that premiered on public radio stations in April 2007; documentary and live performance DVDs; and an education program for K-12 schools to integrate classical music into core subjects. Its goals are to use media in its most public and accessible forms to show that classical music can speak to everyone and to instill a lifelong love of music.

== Television Episodes ==
The Keeping Score television series, three one-hour documentary-style episodes and two live-concert programs, began airing on PBS stations in early November 2006. They have been compared to Leonard Bernstein’s Young People's Concerts which aired in the 1960s. Other programs aired in 2009 and 2011. The first three episodes explore the music of Ludwig van Beethoven, Igor Stravinsky, and Aaron Copland. The series pilot, featuring a comprehensive look at mounting the San Francisco Symphony's performance of Pyotr Ilyich Tchaikovsky’s Symphony No. 4, aired in June 2004.

Two concert performance episodes of the works explored in the series were produced using high-definition technology and 5.1 Dolby surround sound, and aired on High-definition PBS stations throughout the country. The documentary episodes and concert performances are also available on DVD.

InCA Productions, the award-winning documentary production company led by David Kennard and Joan Saffa, produced the documentaries, and Director Gary Halvorson and Producer Michael Bronson captured the performance programs.

== Website ==
The companion website provides an interactive online experience designed to give people of all musical backgrounds a way to explore the music and stories behind the works in much greater depth, and at their own pace. It offers a separate site for each of the three composers, each featuring a historical section devoted to the life and the influences that led to the composition of his revolutionary work. A section in the site allows users to explore the composer's musical scores by integrating audio and video content to follow the score while also offering sections that explore a variety of musical concepts, such as Beethoven's use of themes and key or Stravinsky's intricate use of meter.

== Education ==
Designed to help students learn through the arts, an education program trains teachers in K-12 classrooms to integrate classical music into core subjects such as science, math, English, history and social studies. Participating teachers from partner school districts will be trained by San Francisco Symphony musicians, educational staff, and a variety of arts educators. School districts in San Jose, California; Sonoma County, California; Oklahoma City; and Flagstaff, Arizona join Fresno, California as communities participating in the program.
