= A Bug's Life (soundtrack) =

A Bug's Life: An Original Walt Disney Records Soundtrack

Soundtrack album by Randy Newman
- Released: October 27, 1998
- Recorded: 1997–1998
- Studios: Sony Scoring Stage, Culver City, California; Signet Sound, Los Angeles, California; Conway, Hollywood, California
- Genre: Film score
- Length: 47:32
- Label: Walt Disney
- Producer: Randy Newman

Randy Newman chronology
Michael (1996)	A Bug's Life (1998)	Pleasantville (1998)

A Bug's Life: An Original Walt Disney Records Soundtrack is the soundtrack to the 1998 Disney/Pixar film A Bug's Life featuring original music composed and arranged by Randy Newman and released on October 27, 1998 by Walt Disney Records. Aside the instrumental cues accompanying the album, it also features an original song "The Time of Your Life" written and performed by Newman.

The score transitions from orchestral music to 1940s jazz which was used when Flik travels to the city. It was recorded at the Sony Scoring Stage in Culver City, California, Signet Sound Studios in Los Angeles and Conway Recording Studios in Hollywood, California. The score received a Grammy Award for Best Instrumental Composition Written for a Motion Picture or Television and was also nominated for the Academy Award for Best Original Musical or Comedy Score, and Golden Globe Award for Best Original Score.

In Japan, the film's image song is "STAND" by the Japanese band Hoff Dylan. It is also the first song on the Japanese version of the film's soundtrack.

== Reception ==
Alex Henderson of AllMusic rated three out of five stars to the album, summarising: "A Bug's Life isn't an essential purchase by any means, although some of Newman's more hardcore and devoted fans might find it mildly interesting to hear this other side of him." Ian Freer of Empire also rated three stars and called it as "very likeable but ultimately does not grab the attention as well as it might". Filmtracks.com wrote "A Bug's Life could leave non-Randy Newman fans cold. His jazz is predictable and his generic orchestral animation music begs for more personality. The highlights of both Newman's own Pleasantville from the same year and the competing Antz are superior to anything heard here." Rating four-and-a-half stars out of five, James Southall of Movie Wave called the film's score as "the best of Newman's scores for Pixar" as it "lends itself better than the others to album treatment due to its more flowing, less bitty nature".

Far Out ranked third in the best of Newman's scores (top 10). Writing for that article, Calum Russell summarised: "Randy Newman's Bug's Life score is a joy to listen to, taking the listener immediately back to Pixar's animated world as it so well recreates the essence of the chaos of the city or the intensity of a bird sighting." Also ranking in their top 10 of the composer's best scores, Dalton Norman of Screen Rant wrote "Newman understood what was expected of him and his score is just as fun and jaunty as his previous Pixar outing. He proved he could work cleverly with scope and scale with his music by shrinking the orchestrations down in scenes that needed simplicity. The film is about a tiny world and the music reflects both the smallness of the world and the overwhelming size of Flik's adventure."

== Track listing ==
No.	Title	Length
1.	"The Time of Your Life"	3:16
2.	"The Flik Machine"	2:54
3.	"Seed to Tree"	1:01
4.	"Red Alert"	1:49
5.	"Hopper and His Gang"	3:21
6.	"Flik Leaves"	2:37
7.	"Circus Bugs"	1:27
8.	"The City"	2:35
9.	"Robin Hood"	0:59
10.	"Return to Colony"	1:33
11.	"Flik's Return"	1:24
12.	"Loser"	2:43
13.	"Dot's Rescue"	4:00
14.	"Atta"	1:08
15.	"Don't Come Back"	1:07
16.	"Grasshoppers' Return"	3:01
17.	"The Bird Flies"	2:38
18.	"Ants Fight Back"	2:14
19.	"Victory"	2:33
20.	"A Bug's Life Suite"	5:12
Total length:		47:32

== Accolades ==
Awards
Year	Association	Award Category	Recipient (if any)	Result
1999	Academy Awards	Best Original Musical or Comedy Score	Randy Newman	Nominated
1999	Chicago Film Critics Association	Best Original Score	Randy Newman	Nominated
1999	Golden Globe Awards	Best Original Score	Randy Newman	Nominated
1999	Motion Picture Sound Editors	Best Sound Editing, Music – Animated Feature	Lori L. Escher and Bruno Coon	Nominated
2000	Grammy Awards	Best Instrumental Composition	Randy Newman	Won
2000	Grammy Awards	Best Song (for the song "The Time of Your Life")	Randy Newman	Nominated

== Personnel ==
Credits adapted from CD liner notes.

- Music – Randy Newman
- Producer – Frank Wolf, Randy Newman
- Engineer – Greg Dennen, Mark Eshelman, Pat Weber, Rich Weingart, Sean O'Dwyer, Sue McLean, Tulio Torrinello
- Recording and mixing – Frank Wolf
- Mastering – Doug Sax
- Assistant music editor – Brenda Heins
- Associate music editor – Bruno Coon
- Supervising music editor – Lori Eschler Frystak
- Music supervisor – Andrew Page
- Production manager – Tom MacDougall
- Executive producer – Chris Montan
- Orchestration – Don Davis, Ira Hearshen, Jonathan Sacks
- Orchestra contractor – Sandy De Crescent
- Vocal contractor – Luana Jackman
- Copyist – Jo Ann Kane Music Service
- Art direction – Luis M. Fernández
- Design – Marcella Wong
