= Mambo Birdland =

Live album by Tito Puente
- Released: 1999
- Label: RMM

Tito Puente chronology
Dancemania '99: Live at Birdland (1998)	Mambo Birdland (1999)	Masterpiece (2000)

Mambo Birdland is a live album by the American musician Tito Puente. It was released in 1999.

The album won a Grammy Award for "Best Traditional Tropical Latin Performance"; it was Puente's fifth Grammy. Interviewed after the nominations were announced, Puente expressed particular appreciation as the album coincided with the Latin music resurgence of the late 1990s. Mambo Birdland peaked at No. 14 on Billboard's Tropical Albums chart.

== Production ==
Mambo Birdland was recorded at Birdland. Ray Vega played trumpet on the album. Puente, whose previous album was also a live recording, enjoyed live albums as they allowed him to expand and improvise on songs he had played for decades.

== Critical reception ==
Professional ratings
Review scores
Source	Rating
AllMusic	4/5 stars
The Encyclopedia of Popular Music	4/5 stars
(The New) Rolling Stone Album Guide	3.5/5 stars

The Los Angeles Times called the album "simply exhilarating"; The Dallas Morning News labeled it "sizzling." Hispanic wrote that it "radiates the kind of frenzied, nostalgic, mambospiced energy that has been a Puente trademark since the debut of his popular Dancemania series."

The Toronto Sun noted that "Puente remains a vital performer." The Boston Herald concluded that Mambo Birdland is "studded with excellent playing from such Latin-jazz veterans as Bobby Porcelli, Sonny Bravo and Mario Rivera, but it never forgets the dancers' feet, either."

AllMusic wrote that "Puente has put out more than 100 recordings over his long career, but in little over an hour, this skillfully edited live session manages to capture the essence of that huge repertoire and get to the pure root of Latin jazz."

== Track listing ==
No.	Title	Length
1.	"Mambo Birdland"
2.	"Juventud del Presente"
3.	"Ban Ban Quere"
4.	"Como Está Miguel"
5.	"Cha Cha Cha Mambo"
6.	"Guaguancó Margarito"
7.	"Mi Mamita"
8.	"Mambo Gozón"
9.	"Oye Mi Guaguancó"
10.	"Ran Kan Kan"
11.	"Oye Como Va"
