= Shakespeare in Love (soundtrack) =

Soundtrack album by Stephen Warbeck
- Released: 1998
- Genre: Soundtrack
- Label: Sony Classical

Stephen Warbeck chronology
Electric Frank (1998)	Shakespeare in Love (1998)	Toy Boys (1999)

Shakespeare in Love is the original soundtrack album, on the Sony Classical label, of the 1998 Academy Award-winning and Golden Globe-winning film Shakespeare in Love, starring Joseph Fiennes, Gwyneth Paltrow (who won the Academy Award for Best Actress for her role as "Viola De Lesseps" in this film), Geoffrey Rush, Tom Wilkinson, Imelda Staunton, Ben Affleck and Judi Dench (who won the Academy Award for Best Supporting Actress for her role as "Queen Elizabeth I" in this film). The original score and songs were composed by Stephen Warbeck.

The album won the Academy Award for Best Original Musical or Comedy Score and was nominated for the BAFTA Award for Best Film Music (lost to the score of Elizabeth) and a Grammy Award: Best Instrumental Composition Written for a Motion Picture, Television or Other Visual Media (lost to the score of A Bug's Life).

== Track listing ==
1. The Beginning of the Partnership 2:00
2. Viola's Audition 3:21
3. A Plague on Both Your Houses 1:40
4. The De Lesseps' Dance 2:59
5. A Daughter's Duty :47
6. In Viola's Room 2:54
7. A New World 1:39
8. Love & the Rehearsal 4:19
9. The Arrival of Wessex 1:17
10. Greenwich :52
11. The Brawl 3:13
12. News of Marlowe's Death 2:52
13. Love & the End of the Tragedy 2:11
14. The Missing Scene 1:42
15. The Fight 2:20
16. The Play & the Marriage 2:09
17. Wessex Loses a Bride 1:51
18. The Prologue 1:30
19. The Play (Part 1) 2:25
20. The Play (Part 2) 3:56
21. Curtain Call 2:31
22. Farewell 1:30
23. The End 5:06
- Total Time: 55:04
