= Xzibit discography =

Hip hop recording artist discography

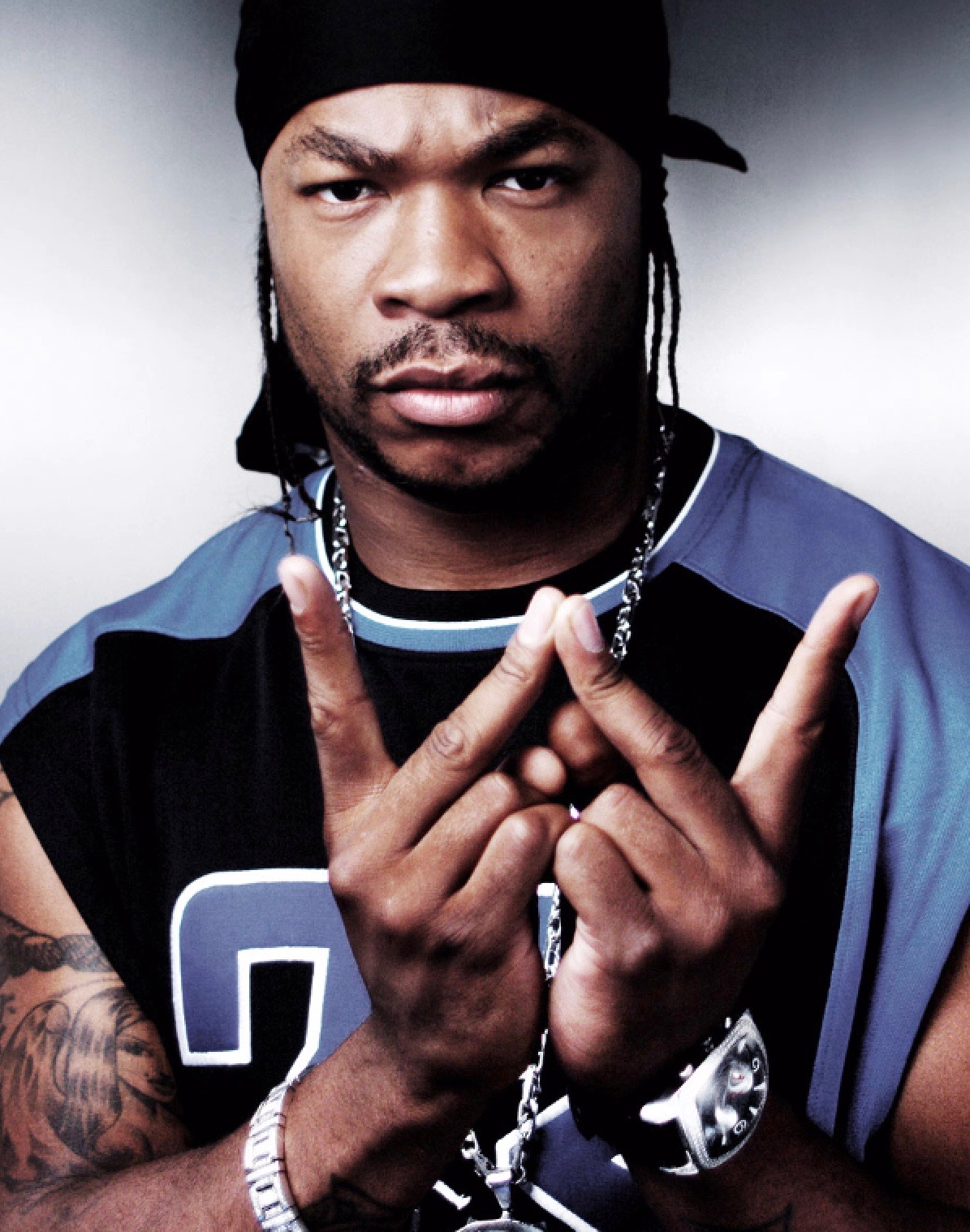
- Studio albums: 8
- Singles: 21
- Music videos: 36

This is the discography of Xzibit, an American rapper.

== Albums ==
=== Studio albums ===
List of studio albums, with selected chart positions, sales figures and certifications
Title	Album details	Peak chart positions										Sales	Certifications
Title	Album details	US	US R&B	US Rap	AUS	CAN	GER	NLD	NZ	SWI	UK	Sales	Certifications
At the Speed of Life	Released: October 1, 1996; Label: Loud, RCA; Format: CD, LP, cassette, digital download	74	22	—	—	38	74	19	—	35	—		
40 Dayz & 40 Nightz	Released: August 25, 1998; Label: Loud, RCA; Format: CD, LP, cassette, digital download	58	14	—	—	50	—	—	—	—	—		
Restless	Released: December 12, 2000; Label: Epic, Loud, Open Bar; Format: CD, LP, cassette, digital download	12	1	—	53	—	21	28	30	40	27		RIAA: Platinum; MC: Platinum; BPI: Gold
Man vs. Machine	Released: October 1, 2002; Label: Columbia, Open Bar, Loud; Format: CD, LP, cassette, digital download	3	1	—	8	8	20	37	36	33	43	US: 593,000	RIAA: Gold; MC: Gold; ARIA: Gold
Weapons of Mass Destruction	Released: December 14, 2004; Label: Columbia, Sony Urban Music, Open Bar; Format: CD, LP, digital download	43	19	11	42	73	27	62	—	27	85	US: 283,000	RIAA: Gold
Full Circle	Released: October 17, 2006; Label: Open Bar, Koch; Format: CD, LP, digital download	50	13	7	—	64	—	—	—	74	—		
Napalm	Released: October 8, 2012; Label: Open Bar, EMI; Format: CD, digital download	150	21	17	—	—	—	—	—	—	—		
Kingmaker	Released: May 16, 2025; Label: Greenback; Format: CD, LP, digital download	—	—	—	—	—	—	—	—	—	—		
"—" denotes a recording that did not chart or was not released in that territory.

=== Collaborative albums ===
Title	Album details
Summer of Sam (with Serial Killers)	Released: October 16, 2020; Label: Open Bar, Empire; Format: CD, digital download

=== Video albums ===
Title	Album details	Certifications
Restless Xposed	Released: 2001; Label: Loud; Format: DVD	ARIA: Gold

== Mixtapes ==
Title	Mixtape details
Appetite for Destruction	Released: 2004; Label: Self-released; Format: CD, digital download
Digital Dynasty 12	Released: 2010; Label: Self-released; Format: CD, digital download
Serial Killers Vol. 1 (with Serial Killers)	Released: 2013; Label: Self-released; Format: CD, digital download
The Murder Show (with Serial Killers)	Released: 2015; Label: Self-released; Format: CD, digital download

== Singles ==
=== As lead artist ===
List of singles, with selected chart positions and certifications, showing year released and album name
Title	Year	Peak chart positions										Certifications	Album
Title	Year	US	US R&B	US Rap	AUS	GER	NL	NZ	SWE	SWI	UK	Certifications	Album
"Paparazzi"	1996	83	61	9	—	11	5	—	7	6	—	BVMI: Gold	At the Speed of Life
"The Foundation"	1996	101	58	16	—	—	—	—	—	—	—		At the Speed of Life
"Eyes May Shine"	1996	—	—	—	—	—	—	—	—	—	—		At the Speed of Life
"Los Angeles Times"	1997	—	—	—	—	—	—	—	—	—	—		Soul in the Hole (soundtrack) / 40 Days & 40 Nights
"What U See Is What U Get"	1998	50	34	3	—	—	—	—	—	—	—		40 Dayz & 40 Nightz
"3 Card Molly"	1998	—	—	—	—	—	—	—	—	—	—		40 Dayz & 40 Nightz
"Pussy Pop" (featuring Jayo Felony and Method Man)	1999	—	113	—	—	—	—	—	—	—	—		40 Dayz & 40 Nightz
"Year 2000"	2000	—	76	24	—	—	—	—	—	—	—		Black and White (soundtrack)
"X"	2000	76	32	36	—	4	12	—	42	5	14	RMNZ: Platinum	Restless
"Front 2 Back"	2000	—	65	42	—	95	—	—	—	66	—	BPI: Silver; BVMI: Gold	Restless
"Get Your Walk On"	2001	—	102	—	—	—	—	—	—	—	—	RMNZ: Gold	Restless
"Multiply" (featuring Nate Dogg)	2002	114	40	23	31	33	76	—	31	33	39		Man vs. Machine
"Choke Me, Spank Me (Pull My Hair)"	2002	—	73	—	—	—	—	—	—	—	—		Man vs. Machine
"Symphony in X Major" (featuring Dr. Dre)	2002	—	63	—	43	—	—	—	—	—	—		Man vs. Machine
"Hey Now (Mean Muggin)" (featuring Keri Hilson)	2004	93	52	—	44	33	79	21	—	42	9	BPI: Silver	Weapons of Mass Destruction
"Muthafucka"	2004	—	85	—	—	—	—	—	—	—	—		Weapons of Mass Destruction
"Concentrate"	2006	—	—	—	—	68	—	—	—	—	—		Full Circle
"Family Values"	2006	—	—	—	—	—	—	—	—	—	—		Full Circle
"Thank You"	2006	—	—	—	—	—	—	—	—	—	—		Full Circle
"Hurt Locker"	2009	—	—	—	—	—	—	—	—	—	—		Non-album single
"Phenom" (featuring Kurupt and 40 Glocc)	2010	—	—	—	—	—	—	—	—	—	—		Napalm
"Napalm"	2012	—	—	—	—	—	—	—	—	—	—		Napalm
"Up Out the Way" (featuring E-40)	2012	—	—	—	—	—	—	—	—	—	—		Napalm
"—" denotes a recording that did not chart or was not released in that territory.

=== As featured artist ===
List of singles, with selected chart positions, showing year released and album name
Title	Year	Peak chart positions			Album
Title	Year	US	US R&B	US Rap	Album
"The Wake Up Show" (Tha Mexakinz featuring Xzibit & Chino XL)	1996	—	—	—	Tha Mexakinz
"Bitch Please" (Snoop Dogg featuring Xzibit and Nate Dogg)	1999	77	26	8	No Limit Top Dogg
"Likwit Connection" (Defari featuring Tash & Xzibit)	1999	—	—	—	Focused Daily
"Game Don't Wait" (Remix) (Warren G featuring Nate Dogg, Snoop Dogg and Xzibit)	1999	—	58	—	I Want It All
"The Anthem" (Sway & King Tech with RZA, Tech N9ne, Eminem, Pharoahe Monch, Kool G Rap, Jayo Felony, Chino XL, KRS-One)	1999	—	—	—	This or That
"Focus" (Erick Sermon featuring DJ Quik and Xzibit)	2000	—	63	—	Erick Onasis
"Connect" (DJ Hurricane featuring Xzibit, Big Gipp and Pharoahe Monch)	2000	—	66	5	Don't Sleep
"Giraffe Pussy" (Apollo Brown featuring Ras Kass, Royce Da 5'9", Xzibit & Bishop Lamont)	2014	—	—	—	Blasphemy
"I Hate You So Much" (Sweet Love featuring Xzibit)	2025	—	—	—	TBA
"Tear It Down" (D12 featuring Xzibit and B-Real)	2026	—	—	—	D12 Forever Vol. 1
"—" denotes a recording that did not chart.

=== Promotional singles ===
List of singles, with selected chart positions, showing year released and album name
Title	Year	Peak chart positions	Certifications	Album
Title	Year	US R&B	Certifications	Album
"Bitch Please II" (Eminem featuring Dr. Dre, Nate Dogg, Snoop Dogg and Xzibit)	2000	61	RIAA: Gold; ARIA: Platinum; RMNZ: Platinum	The Marshall Mathers LP

== Other charted songs ==
List of songs, with selected chart positions and certifications, showing year released and album name
Title	Year	Peak chart positions		Certifications	Album
Title	Year	US R&B	ROM	Certifications	Album
"What's the Difference" (Dr. Dre featuring Xzibit and Eminem)	1999	76	―	BPI: Gold	2001
"Alkaholik"	2000	―	―	RMNZ: Gold	Restless
"My Name" (featuring Eminem and Nate Dogg)	2002	66	58	RMNZ: Gold	Man vs. Machine
"—" denotes a recording that did not chart or was not released in that territory.

== Guest appearances ==
List of non-single guest appearances, with other performing artists, showing year released and album name
Title	Year	Other performer(s)	Album
"Free Style Ghetto"	1995	King Tee, MC Breeze, Tha Alkaholiks	IV Life
"Hit and Run"	1995	Tha Alkaholiks	Coast II Coast
"No Hand Outs"	1995	Tha Alkaholiks	One Million Strong
"The Wake Up Show"	1996	Tha Mexakinz, Chino XL	Tha Mexakinz
"Killin' It"	1997	Tha Alkaholiks	Likwidation
"Three M.C.s"	1997	Kool DJ EQ, Xzibit, Casual	—N/a
"E Lucevan Le Stelle"	1997	—N/a	The Rapsody Overture
"So Good"	1997	Davina	"So Good" (CDS)
"Arch Angels"	1997	Ras Kass	The Lawhouse Experience, Vol. 1
"Prime Time"	1998	Funkmaster Flex, Tha Alkoholiks	The Mix Tape, Vol. III
"Wild Pitch"	1998	Ras Kass, Jah Skillz	Rasassination
"Thunder & Lightning"	1998	Defari, Tash	Focused Daily
"Handle Your Time"	1999	Prince Paul, Sadat X, The King Creole	A Prince Among Thieves
"Keep It Movin'"	1999	Saukrates	The Underground Tapes
"Rework the Angles"	1999	Dilated Peoples, A.G., Defari	—N/a
"Godfathers"	1999	The Whoridas	High Times
"25 ta Life"	1999	Juvenile, Nature, Ja Rule, Reptile	Life (soundtrack)
"Big Business"	1999	Frost, Jayo Felony	That Was Then, This Is Now, Vol. 1
"Loose Cannons"	1999	Kurupt, Daz Dillinger	Tha Streetz Iz a Mutha
"Step Up"	1999	Kurupt, Crooked I	Tha Streetz Iz a Mutha
"Calling Out Names"	1999	Kurupt	Tha Streetz Iz a Mutha
"True Homies"	1999	Tash	Rap Life
"Gz Iz Gz" (Remix)	1999	Tash, Kurupt, Snoop Dogg	Rap Life
"2 Killaz"	1999	Big Hutch	Executive Decisions
"Up From da Undaground"	1999	KRS-One, Ras Kass, Mad Lion	Temple of Hiphop Kulture (Criminal Justice: From Darkness to Light)
"What's the Difference"	1999	Dr. Dre, Eminem	2001
"Some L.A. Niggaz"	1999	Dr. Dre, Defari, Knoc-turn'al, Time Bomb, King T, MC Ren, Kokane	2001
"Now U Wanna"	2000	Somethin' for the People	Issues
"Last Call"	2000	Somethin' for the People	Issues
"New Era"	2000	Barbershop MCs	—N/a
"U Know What's Up" (Millennium Rapdown Remix)	2000	Donell Jones, Pharoahe Monch, Fat Joe, Cuban Link, 50 Cent, Treach	—N/a
"My Writes"	2000	De La Soul, Tash, J-Ro	Art Official Intelligence: Mosaic Thump
"Getcha Groove On"	2000	Limp Bizkit	Chocolate Starfish and the Hot Dog Flavored Water
"Bitch Please II"	2000	Eminem, Snoop Dogg, Dr. Dre, Nate Dogg	The Marshall Mathers LP
"Down for the Count"	2000	Reflection Eternal, Rah Digga	Train of Thought
"Big Bang Theory"	2000	Tha Eastsidaz, Kurupt, CPO	Tha Eastsidaz
"Pop X"	2000	Mack 10, Techniec, Caviar, Skoop Delania, Pinky	The Paper Route
"Better Believe It"	2000	DJ Muggs, King Tee	Soul Assassins II
"Likwit Rhyming"	2000	Tony Touch, Tash, Defari	The Piece Maker
"Los Angeles Times"	2000	Endo	Loud Rocks
"What You See Is What You Get"	2000	Sevendust	Loud Rocks
"U Can't Fuck with Me"	2000	LL Cool J, Snoop Dogg, Jayo Felony	G.O.A.T.
"Where da Paper At"	2000	King Tee	3 Strikes (soundtrack)
"In My Face"	2000	Suga Free, Hi-C	The Konnectid Project, Vol. 1
"Perfect Gentleman" (Remix)	2000	Wyclef Jean, King Yellowman	Perfect Gentleman (CDS)
"The Hardest..."	2001	Kurupt, Nate Dogg, MC Ren	Space Boogie: Smoke Oddessey
"151"	2001	Tha Alkaholiks	X.O. Experience
"Getcha Groove On (Dirtroad Remix)"	2001	Limp Bizkit	New Old Songs
"The Wild Life"	2001	Fat Joe, Prospect	Jealous Ones Still Envy (J.O.S.E.)
"Bounce, Rock, Roller Skate"	2001	Golden State	Training Day (soundtrack)
"Get Fucked Up with Me"	2001	—N/a	The Wash (soundtrack)
"Fuck with Us"	2001	Kurupt, Tray Deee	Bones (soundtrack)
"Keep It G.A.N.G.S.T.A."	2001	Nate Dogg, Lil' Mo	Music and Me
"Bacc 2 L.A."	2001	Soopafly, Daz Dillinger	Dat Whoopty Woop
"Let It Be Known"	2001	Mack 10, Scarface	Bang or Ball
"Some of Em"	2002	Devin the Dude, Nas	Just Tryin' ta Live
"Str8 Westcoast" (Remix)	2002	Knoc-turn'al, Warren G, Shade Sheist, Nate Dogg	L.A. Confidential presents: Knoc-turn'al
"Spit Shine"	2002	—N/a	8 Mile: Music from and Inspired by the Motion Picture
"The X (Y'all Know the Name)"	2002	The X-Ecutioners, Pharoahe Monch, Inspectah Deck, Skillz	Built from Scratch
"Unleash"	2003	Da 5 Footaz, Sticky Fingaz	Lifetime
"Boom Bap (Remix)"	2003	Diamonique	Boom Bap (CDS)
"What We Do"	2004	Knoc-turn'al, Warren G, Nate Dogg	The Way I Am
"I Can't Believe"	2004	Phil da Agony, Krondon	The Aromatic Album
"Stand"	2004	Alice Cooper	Unity: The Official Athens 2004 Olympic Games Album / Dirty Diamonds
"Fight the Power"	2005	Korn	XXX: State of the Union (soundtrack)
"Salam Alajkum (Boogie Down Berlin)"	2005	DJ Tomekk, Sido, Harris	Numma Eyns
"California Vacation"	2006	Game, Snoop Dogg	Doctor's Advocate
"Dying 2 Live"	2008	—N/a	The X-Files: I Want to Believe (soundtrack)
"Don't Ya Dare Laugh"	2009	B-Real, Young De	Smoke N Mirrors
"Limb by Limb"	2009	Timati	The Boss
"People Up on It"	2010	Bliss n Eso	Running on Air
"Life's a Bitch"	2010	Ras Kass	A.D.I.D.A.S. (All Day I Dream About Spittin)
"In Gotti We Trust"	2010	Kurupt	Streetlights
"Goin' Back"	2010	Statik Selektah, Termanology, Cassidy	1982
"The Recipe"	2011	Apathy	Honkey Kong
"Off the Handle"	2012	Adil Omar	The Mushroom Cloud Effect
"Cypher"	2013	HS87, Casey Veggies, Schoolboy Q, Rick Ross, Method Man, Redman, Raekwon	All I've Ever Dreamed Of
"V.I.P."	2013	Tony Touch, Too Short, Kurupt	The Piece Maker 3: Return of the 50 MC's
"And We Run"	2014	Within Temptation	Hydra
"By My Side"	2014	Brotha Lynch Hung, Snoop Dogg, Warren G	Suicide Tour: Ten Years Later
"Loose Cannons"	2015	Dr. Dre, Cold 187um	Compton: A Soundtrack by Dr. Dre
"The Music"	2015	Rick Rock, Crooked I, Angela Hunt	—N/a
"I'm Gucci"	2015	Young Sam	—N/a
"Tusa House"	2015	Kopew	—N/a
"Dem People"	2016	Crooked I, SAS	Good vs. Evil
"Life or Death"	2016	Bishop Lamont, RBX	The Reformation: G.D.N.I.A.F.T.
"Nowhere"	2016	Kam	Mutual Respect
"Any Body Killa"	2016	Kokane, Cold 187um, Big Tray Dee	King of Gfunk
"Turn Me Back"	2016	Koache	Game Point
"The Roof Is in Fire"	2016	Trick Trick, WC	Outlaw
"Highly Aggressive"	2016	Big Tray Deee	The 3rd Coming
"Renegade"	2016	Cold 187um, Sly Piper	The BlackGodFather
"Turn Me Back (Remix)"	2016	Koache, Demrick, Nottz, Quan	Game Point 2.0
"Back Up Off Me"	2016	Bishop Lamont, Kaleb Simmonds	—N/a
"Miranda"	2017	J. Period, Rhymefest, Jesse Williams	Rise Up!
"Bong Song"	2017	B-Real, Garrick Grout	Grow House (OST)
"Medicate"	2017	MC Eiht	Which Way Iz West
"Zion"	2019	Erick Sermon, David Banner, Shaquille O'Neal	Vernia
"Children of the Ghetto"	2019	Diamond D, Styles P, Ashtin Martin	The Diam Piece 2
"Space"	2019	Obie Trice, Lyriq	The Fifth
"Black Sheep"	2023	J. Stone, Butch Cass	The Definition of Success
"Forever (éter - NOS)"	2024	Lenwa Dura, Johnny Mendoza, Dj See All	El Hombre Tras La Rima
"One of Those"	2024	Glasses Malone, Kurupt	Fucc GM
"Break the Mirror"	2024	Ice Cube	Man Down
"Nightmare Walking"	2026	D12, Ice-T	D12 Forever Vol. 1

== Videography ==
- 1996: "Paparazzi" (directed by Michael Lucero)
- ^^^^: "The Foundation" (directed by Michael Lucero)
- 1998: "What U See Is What U Get" (directed by Gregory Dark)
- 1999: "Up From da Underground" (featuring KRS-One & Xzibit) (directed by Atom Rothlein)
- ^^^^: "Bitch Please" (Snoop Dogg featuring Xzibit & Nate Dogg) (directed by Dr. Dre & Phillip Atwell)
- ^^^^: "Game Don't Wait (Remix)" (Warren G featuring Snoop Dogg, Nate Dogg and Xzibit) (directed by Mark Gerard)
- ^^^^: "The Anthem" (Sway & Tech featuring lots of MC's)
- ^^^^: "Gz Iz Gz" (Remix) (Tash featuring Xzibit, Kurupt, Snoop)
- 2000: "Year 2000" (directed by Philip G. Atwell & Xzibit )
- ^^^^: "The Connect" (DJ Hurricane featuring Xzibit, Big Gipp, Pharoahe Monch) (directed by Zodiac Fishgrease, Vanessa Ventura)
- ^^^^: "Front 2 Back" (directed by Diane Martel)
- ^^^^: "X" (directed by David Meyers)
- ^^^^: "Don't Approach Me" (tour video)
- 2001: "Get Your Walk On"(directed by Smith 'N' Borin')
- 2002: "Multiply" (directed by Chris Robinson)
- ^^^^: "Symphony In X Major" (directed by Joe Hahn)
- 2004: "Ride & Smoke"
- ^^^^: "Hey Now (Mean Muggin)" (directed by Benny Boom)
- 2005: "Criminal Set" (directed by Estevan Oriol)
- 2006: "Concentrate" (directed by Little X)
- ^^^^: "Roll on 'Em" (DJ Crazy Toones featuring WC, Young Maylay, MC Ren & Xzibit) (directed by D. Baker)
- 2008: "Thank You"
- 2009: "Figure It Out" (Young De featuring Xzibit and Mykestro
- 2010: "Phenom"
- ^^^^: "Goin' Back" (Statik Selektah & Termanology featuring Cassidy and Xzibit)
- ^^^^: "Hurt Locker"
- 2011: "What It Is"
- ^^^^: "Man on the Moon"
- 2011: "Off the Handle" (Adil Omar featuring Xzibit)
- 2012: "I Don't Dance" (DMX featuring Machine Gun Kelly)
- 2014: "And We Run" (Within Temptation featuring Xzibit)
- 2015: "Juice" by AD
