= Diamond D production discography =

The following is a discography of production credited to Diamond D.

== 1988 ==
=== Raheem ===
- "I'm the King"

== 1990 ==
=== Ultimate Force - I'm Not Playin' ===
- 01. "Another Hit" (Co-produced by Jazzy Jay)
- 02. "C'Mon" (feat. Fat Joe)
- 03. "Girls"
- 04. "I Gotta Go"
- 05. "I'm in Effect"
- 06. "Oh, Shit" (feat. Gizmo, Saladeem, Fat Joe, Kid Sevill)
- 08. "One of the All-Time Greats" (Co-produced by Jazzy Jay)
- 09. "Revolution of the Mind"
- 10. "Smooth as Suede"
- 11. "Supreme Diamond D" (Co-produced by Jazzy Jay)
- 12. "Tuff (So Damn)"

=== Lord Finesse & DJ Mike Smooth – Funky Technician ===
- 03. "Funky Technician"
- 05. "Here I Come"
- 07. "I Keep the Crowd Listening"
- 08. "Bad Mutha"
- 09. "Keep It Flowing"

== 1992 ==
=== Showbiz & AG ===
- "I'm Convinced" (previously unreleased)

=== Lord Finesse – Return of the Funky Man ===
- 06. "Praise the Lord"
- 09. "Isn't He Something?"
- 13. "That's How Smooth I Am"
- 15. "Fuck 'Em"
- 00. "Praise the Lord (Remix)"

=== Ghetto Girlz - Ain't Takin No S@#t ===
- 04. "That's What She Wrote"
- 05. "Marked for Death"
- 06. "Alphabetical Order"
- 08. "Bitch Ass Nigga"

=== Busy Bee - Thank God for Busy Bee ===
- 02. "Get With Me"
- 10. "Home Boyz"
- 12. "I Got Things Sewed"
- 14. "My Personality"

=== Showbiz & AG - Runaway Slave ===
- 08. "Hard to Kill" (Co-produced by Showbiz)
- 14. "Soul Clap (Short Version)" (Co-produced by Showbiz)

=== Diamond D - Stunts, Blunts and Hip Hop ===
- 01. "Intro"
- 02. "Best-Kept Secret"
- 03. "Sally Got a One-Track Mind"
- 04. "Step to Me" (Co-produced by Showbiz)
- 05. "Shut the Fuck Up" (Co-produced by Showbiz)
- 06. "Fuck What U Heard" (Co-produced by Sadat X)
- 07. "I'm Outta Here" (Co-produced by Showbiz)
- 08. "A Day in the Life"
- 09. "Last Car on the 2 Train"
- 10. "Red Light, Green Light"
- 11. "I Went for Mine" (Co-produced by Jazzy Jay)
- 12. "Comments from Big L and Showbiz"
- 13. "Check One, Two" (Co-produced by The 45 King)
- 14. "What You Seek"
- 15. "Lunchroom Chatter"
- 16. "Confused"
- 17. "Pass Dat Shit"
- 18. "Freestyle (Yo, That's That Shit)" (Co-produced by Large Professor)
- 19. "K.I.S.S. (Keep It Simple Stupid)" (Co-produced by Q-Tip)
- 20. "Stunts, Blunts & Hip Hop"
- 21. "Wuffman Stressed Out"
- 22. "Feel the Vibe" (Co-produced by Showbiz)
- 23. "A View From the Underground"
- "Best Kept Secret (Remix) by The45 King & Diamond D)"

=== The A.T.E.E.M. ===
- "Yeah (Diamond Mix)"

=== Mi Jette & Money Mark – U Want Me Back 12" ===
- A1. "U Want Me Back"

=== R.O.C. ===
- "Dedicated to My Girl (Diamond Mix)"

=== Brand Nubian - Punks Jump Up to Get Beat Down 12" ===
- B1. "Punks Jump Up to Get Beat Down (Remix)" [feat. Diamond D]

== 1993 ==
=== Brand Nubian - In God We Trust ===
- 14. "Punks Jump Up to Get Beat Down"

=== Diamond D - I'm Outta Here (Remix) 12" ===
- A1. "I'm Outta Here (Remix)"
- B1. "You Can't Front" (feat. Lord Finesse & Sadat X) (Co-produced by Buckwild)

=== Apache - Apache Ain't Shit ===
- 10. "Who Freaked Who" (featuring Nikki D)
- 11. "Get Ya Weight Up"

=== Fat Joe - Represent ===
- 04. "Bad Bad Man"
- 05. "Watch the Sound" (featuring Grand Puba & Diamond D)
- 06. "Flow Joe"
- 07. "Da Fat Gangsta"
- 08. "Shorty Gotta Fat Ass"
- 10. "You Must Be out of Your Fuckin' Mind" (featuring Apache & Kool G Rap)
- 13. "Get on Up"

=== Cypress Hill - When the Ship Goes Down 12" ===
- "When the Ship Goes Down (Diamond Mix)"

=== Illegal - The Untold Truth ===
- 02. "Illegal Will Rock"
- 04. "CrumbSnatcher" (feat. Diamond D)
- 00. "We Getz Buzy (Remix)"

=== Ed O.G. and Da Bulldogs - Roxbury 02119 ===
- 01. "Streets of the Ghetto"
- 02. "Busted"
- 03. "Love Comes and Goes"
- 05. "I Thought Ya Knew"
- 10. "Dat Ain't Right"

=== Red Hot Lover Tone - Give It Up 12" ===
- "Give It Up (Remix)"

=== Yaggfu Front - "Slappin' Suckas Silly 12" ===
- "Slappin' Suckas Silly (Remix)" [feat. Diamond D]

=== Raazda Rukkuz - Da Chronic Asthmatics / Loco Impact 12" ===
- A1. "Da Chronic Asthmatics"
- B1. "Loco Impact"

=== Private Investigators ===
- "Who Am I? (God) [Remix]"

=== Leaders of the New School - Classic Material / Spontaneous (13 MC's Deep!) 12" ===
- A2. "Classic Material (Remix)"

=== Class A Felony – Class A Felony ===
- 17. "I Can't Take No More" (feat. Diamond D and Lakim Shabazz)

== 1994 ==
=== Fu-Schnickens - Nervous Breakdown ===
- 05. "Aaahh Ooohhh!"
- 06. "Sneakin' Up on Ya"

=== A.D.O.R. - The Concrete ===
- 05. "Day 2 Day"
- 09. "Keep It Real" (Feat. Diamond D)
- 11. "The Kid Is Crazy"
- 13. "Heart And Soul"

=== Shadz of Lingo - A View to a Kill ===
- 01. "Different Stylez"
- 03. "Ill & Get Clowned"
- 07. "Think I Give a F-K"
- 08. "Don't Test da Skillz"

=== Nefertiti - L.I.F.E. ===
- 05. "Family Tree"
- 10. "Come Down Baby"

=== House of Pain - Same as It Ever Was ===
- 07. "Word Is Bond" (feat. Diamond D)
- 00. "Word Is Bond (Remix)" [feat. Diamond D]

=== Justice System - 12" ===
- "Dedication to Bambaata (Diamond D Reminisce Remix)"

=== Various Artists - B-Ball's Best Kept Secrets ===
- "Ya Don't Stop" (Dana Barros & Cedric Ceballos feat. A.G, Diamond D and Brand Nubian)

=== Outkast - 12" ===
- "SouthernPlayalistiCadillacMuzik (Remix)"

=== Scientifik - Criminal ===
- 02. "I Got Planz" (feat. Diamond D)
- 05. "Yeah Daddy"

=== The Veldt - Afrodisiac ===
- 19. "Soul in a Jar (Guitar Mix)"

=== Joi - The Pendulum Vibe ===
- 02. "Freedom" (feat. Shadez of Lingo)
- 12. "Freedom (Celebration Mix)"

=== Total Devastation - 12" ===
- 19. "Wonderful World of Skins (Remix)"

=== Lucas - Lucas with the Lid Off 12" ===
- B3. "Cityzen (Diamond D Remix)"

=== Terror Tongue ===
- "Lyrical Threat" (unreleased)

== 1995 ==
=== Red Hot Lover Tone - #1 Player ===
- 02. "#1 Player"
- 11. "Bust tha Maneuva"

=== The Pharcyde - Labcabincalifornia ===
- 03. "Groupie Therapy"

=== KRS-One - KRS-One ===
- 11. "Build Ya Skillz" (feat. Busta Rhymes)
- 13. "Squash All Beef"

=== KRS-One - Ah Yeah 12" ===
- "Ah Yeah (Diamond Flava)"
- "Ah Yeah (Diamond Rhode Mix)"

=== Fat Joe - Jealous One's Envy ===
- 01. "Bronx Tale" (featuring KRS-One)
- 11. "Watch Out" (featuring Armageddon, Big Pun & Keith Nut)

=== Tha Alkaholiks - Coast II Coast ===
- 03. "Let It Out"
- 11. "The Next Level" (feat. Diamond D) {Co-produced by E-Swift}

=== Scha Dara Parr - 12" ===
- A2. "サマージャム'95 [Diamond-D Remix]"

=== Urban Thermo Dynamics - 12" ===
- "Manifest Destiny"

=== Various Artists - D&D Project ===
- "Look Alive" - Big C

=== Big Red - Created a Monster 12" ===
- A1. "Created a Monster"
- B1. "How They Want It" (feat. Diamond D)

=== Various artists - Freedom (Theme From Panther) 12" ===
- A1. "Freedom (Theme From Panther) [Diamond D's Crystal Mix]"

== 1996 ==
=== Fugees - The Score ===
- 09. "The Score" (featuring Diamond D) {co-produced by the Fugees}

=== Raekwon - 12" ===
- "Rainy Dayz (Mr. Dalvin Remix)" [feat. Ghostface Killah & Jodeci] {co-production, programming & mixing}

=== Ras Kass - Soul on Ice 12" ===
- A2. "Soul on Ice (Diamond's Icey Remix)"

=== Xzibit - At the Speed of Life ===
- 10. "Bird's Eye View"

=== Party Arty - 12" ===
- "Enjoy Yourself"

=== Busta Rhymes - Far Away 12" ===
- A3. "Far Away" (feat. Hurricane G)

=== Sadat X - Wild Cowboys ===
- 02. "Wild Cowboys"
- 09. "Petty People"
- 12. "Move On"

=== Various artists - America Is Dying Slowly ===
- 14. "Stay Away from the Nasty Hoes" - Sadat X, Fat Joe, & Diamond D

=== Mondo Grosso - Diggin' Into the Real ===
- "Do You See What I See? (Remix)"

=== Various artists - The New Groove: The Blue Note Remix Project ===
- 07. "Summer Song (Diamond D Remix)" - Ronnie Foster

== 1997 ==
=== Organized Konfusion - The Equinox ===
- 05. "Questions"

=== D.I.T.C. - 12" ===
- "Day One"

=== Diamond D - Hatred, Passions and Infidelity ===
- 01. "Intro" (performed by Kid Capri and Busta Rhymes)
- 02. "Flowin'" (feat. John Dough)
- 03. "MC Iz My Ambition" (feat. Don Barron)
- 04. "No Wonduh (The Projects)"
- 05. "The Hiatus"
- 07. "Painz & Strife" (feat. Pete Rock and Phife Dawg)
- 08. "Can't Keep My Grands to Myself" (feat. Mark-Lo and Paradise)
- 10. "This One" (feat. Busta Rhymes)
- 11. "Never" (feat. Sadat X and K. Terroribul)
- 12. "Cream N Sunshine" (feat. Veronica)
- 13. "Gather Round"
- 14. "K.T." (performed by K. Terroribul)
- 16. "Epilogue"
- 00. "Hiatus (Remix)" [feat. Cru]

=== Afro Jazz - Afrocalypse ===
- 07. "Sucker MC" (Feat. Andre Doc)
- 08. "Mystic"
- 11. "Parias v/s Estat" (feat. Papalu)

== 1998 ==
=== Busta Rhymes - Extinction Level Event (Final World Front) ===
- 17. "What the Fuck You Want!!"

=== Queen Latifah - Order in the Court ===
- 13. "I Don't Know" (featuring Sisqó)

=== Brand Nubian - Foundation ===
- 19. "Foundation"

=== D.I.T.C. - 12" ===
- "I Flip Styles" (feat. Brand Nubian)

=== Scaramanga - 7 Eyes, 7 Horns ===
- 03. S.I.R.

=== A.D.O.R. - The Rush / Ruthless Confrontation 12" ===
- A1. "The Rush"

== 1999 ==
=== Mos Def - Black on Both Sides ===
- 02. "Hip Hop"

=== Too Short - Can't Stay Away ===
- 04. "Here We Go" (featuring Jay-Z and Jermaine Dupri)

=== Pharoahe Monch - Internal Affairs ===
- 11. "The Ass" (featuring Apani B. Fly)
- 12. "The Light"
- 14. "The Truth" (featuring Common and Talib Kweli)

=== Various artists - Violator: The Album ===
- 18. "Bus-A-Bus (Remix)" - Busta Rhymes

=== A.G. - The Dirty Version ===
- 06. "No Where to Go" (feat. A.G., Kool Chuck and Diamond D)

=== Various artists - Soundbombing 2 ===
- 21. "When It Pours It Rains" - Diamond D

=== Diamond D - 12" ===
- "Feel It" (feat. Sadat X)

== 2000 ==
=== Freddie Foxxx - Industry Shakedown ===
- 11. "Bumpy, Bring it Home"

=== D.I.T.C. - D.I.T.C. ===
- 07. "Foundation"

=== Sadat X - State of NY vs. Derek Murphy ===
- 01. "X-Man" (feat. Diamond D)
- 06. "You Can't Deny"

=== A.D.O.R. - Animal 2000 ===
- 05. "Cock'd Back"

=== Unbound Allstars ===
- "Mumia 911"

== 2001 ==
=== Busta Rhymes - Genesis ===
- 13. "Wife-In-Law" (featuring Jaheim)

=== Muro ===
- "Lyrical Tyrants (Diamond Mix)" [feat. Diamond D & O.C.]

== 2002 ==
=== The 45 King ===
- "Double Dare"

== 2003 ==
=== Diamond D - Grown Man Talk ===
- 01. "Intro"
- 02. "Time Will Heal U"
- 03. "Da Magnificent"
- 04. "Like Us"
- 05. "In Da BX"
- 06. "Why Yawl Hatin"
- 07. "Watch Me"
- 08. "Put it Down"
- 09. "Live My Life"
- 11. "I Know You Really Want It"
- 12. "Don't Mean Shit 2 Me"
- 13. "If I Were Ya Woman"
- 14. "So Lovely"
- 15. "2 Late"
- 16. "Love"
- 17. "50 Wayz"

=== Akrobatik - Balance ===
- 07. "Feedback" (feat. Diamond D)

=== ASD ===
- "Sag Mir Wo Die Party Ist"

== 2004 ==
=== Ed O.G. Featuring Pete Rock - My Own Worst Enemy ===
- 05. "Streets Is Callin'" (feat. Jaysaun and Diamond D)

=== The Omen - DJ Rhetmatic Mixtape ===
- "It's Our World"

== 2005 ==
=== Sadat X - Experience & Education ===
- 06. "The Great Diamond D" (feat. Heltah Skeltah)

=== Earatik Statik - Feelin' Earatik ===
- 12. "People like US" (feat. Pacewon)

=== A.D.O.R. - Signature of Ill ===
- 06. "The Realness"
- 08. "Signature of the Ill"

=== Medina Green ===
- "Green Boogie"

== 2006 ==
=== Sadat X - Black October ===
- 03. "The Post"

=== Cannonball Adderley ===
- "Bohemia in the Dark (Remix)"

== 2007 ==
=== Sean Price - Master P ===
- 09. "Get It Together" (feat. Diamond D)

== 2008 ==
=== Diamond D - The Huge Hefner Chronicles ===
- 06. "Good Tymez"
- 10. "When Ur Hot Ur Hot"
- 11. "I Wanna Leave"

== 2009 ==
=== Collective Efforts - Freezing World ===
- 04. "I Get Down"

=== Freestyle Professors - Gryme Tyme ===
- 17. "Think About It"

== 2011 ==
=== Pharoahe Monch - W.A.R. (We Are Renegades) ===
- 08. "Shine" (featuring Mela Machinko)

=== J-Live - S.P.T.A. (Said Person of That Ability) ===
- 07. "No Time to Waste"

=== Torae - For the Record ===
- 08. "Changes"

== 2013 ==
=== Fat Joe - The Darkside III ===
- 07. "Cypher" (feat. Nick Shades)

== 2014 ==
=== D.I.T.C. - The Remix Project ===
- 02. "Internationally Known (Diamond D Remix)"

=== Bigrec - DoomsDay ===
- 01. "The Dawning"
- 02. "Bullseye"
- 03. "If U Believe" (feat. Blake Moses)
- 04. "Unstoppable"
- 05. "NO 2 NC" (feat. Shred TVT)
- 06. "Abomination"
- 07. "Calisthenics"
- 08. "DoomsDay"
- 09. "I Cried" (feat. Jawz Of Life)
- 10. "New Order" (feat. TH5PENTAGON)
- 11. "Be Strong"
- 12. "Nowhere To Run"
- 13. "The Dumb Out" (feat. RA The Rugged Man)

=== Various artists - Coalmine Records Presents: Unearthed ===
- 20. "Boyz II Men (Diamond D Remix)" - Blu and Nottz)Nottz

=== Dilated Peoples - Directors of Photography ===
- 09. "Let Your Thoughts Fly Away"

=== Diamond D - The Diam Piece ===
- 01. "Rap Life" (featuring Pharoahe Monch)
- 02. "Where's the Love" (featuring Talib Kweli, Elzhi and Skyzoo)
- 03. "It's Nothin'" (featuring Fat Joe, Chi Ali and Freddie Foxxx)
- 04. "Only Way 2 Go" (featuring Pete Rock)
- 05. "Hard Days" (featuring The Pharcyde)
- 06. "I Ain't the One to Fuc Wit" (featuring Scram Jones)
- 07. "Pump Ya Brakes" (featuring Rapsody, Boog Brown and Stacy Epps)
- 08. "Take Em off da Map" (featuring Black Rob)
- 09. "We Are the People of the World" (featuring Kurupt and Tha Alkaholiks)
- 10. "Jose Feliciano"
- 11. "Handz Up" (featuring Hi-Tek)
- 12. "Pain" (featuring A.G. and Chino XL)
- 13. "Vanity" (featuring Nottz)
- 14. "It's Magic" (featuring Step Brothers)
- 15. "The Game" (featuring Grand Daddy I.U.)
- 16. "Let the Music Talk" (featuring Kev Brown)
- 17. "Ace of Diamonds" (featuring Masta Ace)
- 18. "187" (featuring Guilty Simpson and Ras Kass)

=== Diamond District - March on Washington (Redux) ===
- 08. "Everything (Diamond D Remix)"

== 2015 ==
=== eMC - The Tonite Show ===
- 04. "The Monologue"

=== The Regiment - The aRchives ===
- 02. "Four Finger Ring Music" (featuring Diamond D)

== 2016 ==
=== D.I.T.C. - D.I.T.C. Studios ===
- 09. "Brolic" (featuring A.G., O.C. and Diamond D)

=== Sadat X - Agua ===
- 05. "Head Shot"

== 2017 ==
=== Showbiz and A.G. - Take It Back ===
- 11. "Breathe Easy"

=== Sadat X - The Sum of a Man ===
- 01. "The Devil Is Near" (featuring Jawz of Life)
- 02. "Neva" (featuring Timmy Hunter)
- 03. "Good Inside"
- 04. "Out of Bounds" (featuring Diamond D)
- 05. "Always Be My Lady" (featuring Raheem DeVaughn)
- 06. "Yawl Can't Drink with Us" (featuring Kurupt & Tha Alkaholiks)
- 07. "Celebrate"
- 08. "Who's Judging" (featuring Tony Sunshine)
- 09. "Bang Bang"
- 10. "Get Away"
- 11. "The Five Boroughs"
- 12. "Reflections"
