= Michael Lucero =

American music video director (1963–1998)

- Born: Michael John Lucero; September 26, 1963; San Jose, California
- Died: May 8, 1998 (aged 34); Elko County Nevada
- Occupation: Music video director

Michael John Lucero (September 26, 1963 – May 8, 1998) was an American music video director. He died in a car accident in Nevada on May 8, 1998.

Xzibit dedicated his 1998 video for “What U See Is What U Get” to Lucero.

== Videography ==
=== 1991 ===
- Del tha Funkee Homosapien — "Sleepin' on My Couch"
- Del tha Funkee Homosapien — "Dr. Bombay"

=== 1993 ===
- Da King and I - "Tears"
- Private Investigators - "Who am I? (God)"
- Leaders of the New School — "What's Next"
- Too Short — "I'm a Player"
- KRS-One — "Sound of da Police"
- Souls of Mischief — "93 'til Infinity"
- Common – "Breaker 1/9"

=== 1994 ===
- Leaders of the New School — "Classic Material"
- Boogiemonsters — "Strange"
- Boogiemonsters — "Recognized Thresholds of Negative Stress"
- Black Sheep — "Without a Doubt"
- Organized Konfusion — "Stress"
- Luna — "This Time Around"
- Kurious — "I'm Kurious"
- Da Bush Babees — "Swing It"
- Rampage — "Beware Of The Rampsack"

=== 1995 ===
- Tha Alkaholiks — "The Next Level"
- Deadeye Dick — "Paralyze Me"
- Dream Warriors — "California Dreamin'"

=== 1996 ===
- Busta Rhymes featuring Ol' Dirty Bastard — "Woo Hah!! Got You All in Check" [The Worldwide Remix]
- Dru Down - ''Can You Feel Me''
- Xzibit — "Paparazzi"
- Art n' Soul — "Ever Since You Went Away"
- Dog Eat Dog — "Isms"
- Nine — "Lyin' King"
- Ginuwine — "Pony"
- Xzibit — "The Foundation"
- Richie Rich — "Let's Ride"
- MC Lyte — "Everyday"

=== 1997 ===
- Luniz — "Jus Mee & U"
- Shelter — "Whole Wide World"
- Bounty Killer featuring Fugees — "Hip-Hopera"
- Jonny Lang — "Lie to Me"
- Dr. Dre — "Kush"
- Ginuwine — "Tell Me Do U Wanna"
- The O'Jays — "What's Stopping You"
- Next — "Butta Love"
- Ginuwine — "When Doves Cry"
- Jonny Lang — "Missing Your Love"
- The Honeyrods — "Love Bee"
