= Tha Mexakinz (album) =

Studio album by Tha Mexakinz
- Released: August 13, 1996
- Studios: Kitchen Sync Studios (Hollywood, CA); Fluid Recording Studio
- Genres: Latin hip hop; hardcore hip hop
- Length: 1:00:58
- Label: Wild West Records
- Producers: Bird; Sinful; Thayod

Tha Mexakinz chronology
Zig Zag (1994)	Tha Mexakinz (1996)	Crossing All Borders (1998)

Professional ratings
Review scores
Source	Rating
AllMusic	2.5/5 stars
Muzik	3/5 stars

Tha Mexakinz is the second full-length studio album by American Latin hip hop duo Tha Mexakinz. It was released on August 13, 1996, through Wild West Records. Recording sessions took place at Kitchen Sync Studios in Hollywood and at Fluid Recording Studio. Production was handled by member Sinful, as well as Thayod Ausar and Bird, with Morris Taft serving as executive producer. It features guest appearances from Chino XL, Supherb, Xzibit, K.Y.M., Danjah, Detriment, Rom, Moziz and Frost.

== Track listing ==
No.	Title	Writer(s)	Producer(s)	Length
1.	"Introlude"	Rudy Archuleta; Eric Banks	Thayod Ausar	1:17
2.	"U Don't Even Know Me"	Archuleta; Banks	Thayod Ausar	4:05
3.	"Never in This World"	Archuleta; Rodrigo Navarro	Sinful	4:37
4.	"Plead Insanity"	Archuleta; Navarro; Banks	Thayod Ausar	4:00
5.	"Problems" (featuring K.Y.M.)	Navarro	Sinful	5:05
6.	"La Plaga"	Navarro	Sinful	3:38
7.	"2 Many MC's"	Archuleta; Navarro	Sinful	3:22
8.	"Confessions" (featuring K.Y.M.)	Archuleta; Navarro	Sinful	5:10
9.	"Frost Interlude"	Navarro; Arturo Mollina Jr.	Sinful	1:17
10.	"Instinct"	Archuleta; Banks	Thayod Ausar; I-Man (co.)	4:36
11.	"Provoke the Extreme" (featuring Supherb and Chino XL)	Archuleta; Jay Anderson; Derek Barbosa; Banks	Thayod Ausar	4:11
12.	"Burnin' Hot"	Archuleta; Navarro; Lamont Holbdy	Bird	4:25
13.	"Realism"	Archuleta; Navarro	Sinful	3:47
14.	"Headz or Taylz" (featuring Danjah, Detriment, Rom and Moziz)	Navarro; F. Richardson; R. Henderson; L. Brown; C.E. McDonald	Sinful; Abstruse (co.)	4:49
15.	"The Wake Up Show" (featuring Xzibit and Chino XL)	Archuleta; Navarro; Alvin Joiner; Barbosa	Sinful	3:38
16.	"2 Many MC's" (Remix)	Archuleta; Navarro; Morris Taft	Morris Taft
17.	"Burnin Hot Remix"	Archuleta; Navarro; Holbdy	Click Tha Supah Latin
Total length:				1:00:58

== Personnel ==
- Rudy "I-Man" Archuleta – vocals, co-producer (track 10), mixing (tracks: 1–4, 8–10), arranger (tracks: 3, 8, 10, 11), programming (track 11)
- Rodrigo "Sinful" Navarro – vocals, scratches, producer (tracks: 3, 5–9, 13–15), mixing (tracks: 3, 5, 6, 8, 13), arranger & programming (tracks: 3, 5–8, 13), keyboards (track 6)
- K.Y.M. – chorus vocals (tracks: 5, 8)
- Derek "Chino XL" Barbosa – rap vocals (tracks: 11, 15)
- Jay "Supherb" Anderson – rap vocals (track 11)
- Danjah – vocals (track 14)
- Detriment – vocals (track 14)
- Moziz – vocals (track 14)
- Rom – vocals (track 14)
- Alvin "Xzibit" Joiner – rap vocals (track 15)
- Del Atkins – keyboards & bass (tracks: 5, 8)
- Mark "DJ Nu-Mark" Potsic – scratches (track 12)
- Malcolm French – guitar (track 16)
- Nick Steinberg – bass (track 16)
- Eric "Thayad" Banks – producer (tracks: 1, 2, 4, 10, 11), arranger & programming (tracks: 1, 2, 4, 10, 11), mixing (tracks: 2, 4, 10)
- Lamont "Bird" Holbdy – producer (track 12)
- Abstruse – co-producer (track 14)
- Morris Taft – producer (track 16), executive producer, A&R
- Anthony "Click Tha Supah Latin" Rivera – producer & mixing (track 17)
- Sean Freehill – mixing (tracks: 1, 4, 9)
- Dennis Grubbs – art direction
- Chris Dubrowsky – photography
