= Touch of Soul =

Studio album by Art n' Soul
- Released: March 26, 1996
- Recorded: Paradise Studios; Sacramento, California
- Genre: R&B
- Length: 55:26
- Label: Big Beat
- Producer: Timothy Christian Riley; Craig Kallman (exec.); Dave Moss (exec.)

Singles from Touch of Soul
- 1. "Ever Since You Went Away" Released: January 30, 1996; 2. "All My Luv" Released: July 23, 1996

Touch of Soul is the only studio album by American contemporary R&B group Art n' Soul, released March 26, 1996 via Big Beat Records. The album was co-produced by Craig Kallman and Tony! Toni! Toné! drummer Timothy Christian Riley. It did not chart on the Billboard 200; however, it peaked at #36 on the R&B Albums chart and #27 on the Heatseekers chart.

Two singles were released from the album: "Ever Since You Went Away" and "All My Luv". "Ever Since You Went Away" was the group's only song to chart on the Billboard Hot 100, peaking at #72 in 1996.

== Track listing ==
All music is composed by Timothy Christian Riley.

No.	Title	Writer(s)	Length
1.	"Ever Since You Went Away"	Rodney Lattrel Evans; Timothy Christian Riley; Sam Bostic	6:05
2.	"Stay with Me" (^{A})	John T. Smith; Timothy Christian Riley; Sam Bostic; Bruce Woolley; Simon Darlow; Steve Lipson; Trevor Horn	5:18
3.	"Special"	Fred Busby; Timothy Christian Riley	5:39
4.	"U Changed" (^{B})	Dion Riley; Fred Busby; Timothy Christian Riley; Sam Bostic; Abrim Tilmon, Jr.	5:13
5.	"Ridin'"	Fred Busby; Timothy Christian Riley	4:29
6.	"Light the Candles" (Interlude)	John T. Smith; Rodney Lattrel Evans; Sam Bostic	1:05
7.	"Nature Rise"	Timothy Christian Riley; Sam Bostic	5:49
8.	"Touch of Soul" (^{C})	Fred Busby; Timothy Christian Riley; John T. Smith; Danny Webster; Mark Hicks; Raye Turner; Steve Arrington; Leroy Gomes	4:26
9.	"A Sexy Solo" (Interlude)	Timothy Christian Riley	1:38
10.	"All My Luv"	Rodney Lattrel Evans; Sam Bostic	5:04
11.	"Goin' On"	John T. Smith; Sam Bostic	4:32
12.	"That's How Love Goes"	Timothy Christian Riley; Sam Bostic	5:22
13.	"Dog N' Me" (^{D})	Fred Busby; W. Mitchell; Timothy Christian Riley; Al Green; Willie Mitchell; Al Jackson, Jr.; James Brown; Fred Wesley; John Starks; Sly Stone	4:00
14.	"Light the Candles" (Reprise)	John T. Smith; Rodney Lattrel Evans; Sam Bostic	0:56

== Samples ==
A. Contains a sample of "Don't Cry - It's Only the Rhythm" by Grace Jones.
B. Contains a sample of "You're Gettin' a Little Too Smart" by The Detroit Emeralds.
C. Contains a sample of "Just a Touch of Love" by Slave and "Hihache" by Lafayette Afro Rock Band.
D. Contains a sample of "Let's Stay Together" by Al Green, "The Payback" by James Brown, and "Sing a Simple Song" by Sly and the Family Stone.

== Chart positions ==
Chart (1996)	Peak position
US Heatseekers (Billboard)	27
US R&B Albums (Billboard)	36
