= Ever Since You Went Away =

1996 single by Art n' Soul

Single by Art n' Soul

from the album Touch of Soul
- Released: January 30, 1996
- Genre: R&B
- Length: 6:05 (album version); 4:00 (single edit)
- Label: Big Beat
- Songwriter(s): Rodney Lattrel Evans; Timothy Christian Riley; Sam Bostic
- Producer(s): Timothy Christian Riley

Art n' Soul singles chronology
"Ever Since You Went Away" (1996)	"All My Luv" (1996)

Music video
- "Ever Since You Went Away" on VH1.com

"Ever Since You Went Away" is a song by Art n' Soul. The song is the opening track from the band's debut album Touch of Soul and was issued as the album's first single. It was written by band members Sam Bostic and Rodney Lattrel Evans, along with Tony! Toni! Toné! drummer Timothy Christian Riley, who also produced the song. The song was the band's only song to chart on the Billboard Hot 100, peaking at #72 in 1996.

== Music video ==
The official music video for the song was directed by Michael Lucero.

== Chart positions ==
Chart (1996)	Peak position
US Billboard Hot 100	72
US Hot R&B/Hip-Hop Singles & Tracks (Billboard)	19
