= Click Tha Supah Latin =

American rapper

Click Tha Supah Latin Anthony Rivera
- Born: Chula Vista, California, U.S.
- Origin: Los Angeles, California, U.S.
- Genres: Underground hip hop
- Occupations: Rapper; Beatboxer
- Years active: 1990s-present
- Labels: Wild West; Underload; Fluid
- Formerly of: Tha Mexakinz; Delinquent Habits; Jurassic 5 Styles of Beyond

Click Tha Supah Latin (real name Anthony Rivera) is a Los Angeles, California-based rapper, beatboxer, and record producer.

== Biography ==
Click's family is originally from Peru, but he was born on August 12, 1969 in Chula Vista, California and raised in both Lennox and Hawthorne. He began his career as a Beatboxer before becoming a record producer. He produced remixes for artists like tha Mexakinz and Delinquent Habits before beginning a career as a solo artist in 1996. His self-produced debut album, This Iz How I Know, was released in 1997; it was followed by Square Won in 2001. Over the course of his career, he has beatboxed with Jurassic 5 and Styles of Beyond, and has appeared as a beatboxer in the film "She's All That", and also appears on the deleted scenes of the film "Malibu's Most Wanted". His most notable credit is recording beatbox overdubs for the now Hip Hop classic film "8 Mile". Jurassic 5 rapper Akil appears on "Jaw Jabbin'" and "This Iz How I Know" along with Click's high school friend D Strong, who was a member of the first crew Click was ever a part of (The Devastatin' Dose). The entire Jurassic 5 is featured on the track "Lunch Time".

Throughout Click's career he would often feature his kids on stage as part of his show. His oldest, Anthony Jr, has been on stage since the early age of 3, and as time went on he included his youngest son Joseph, and then his daughter Alissa. The legacy now continues as his oldest son, Anthony Rivera Jr, now going by "Tek tha Supah Latin", has picked up the mic and has become a well respected emcee in the LA Hip Hop scene. Click has produced most of Tek's releases including his latest release "Wess Wess" (3/2019).

== Discography ==
- This Iz How I Know (Wild West, 1997)
- Square Won (Wild West/Underload/Fluid, 2001)
- Contact (G Boy Entertainment, 2007) under the artist name Click88
