= Crossing All Borders =

Studio album by Tha Mexakinz
- Released: April 14, 1998
- Recorded: 1997–1998
- Genre: Latin hip hop, hardcore hip hop, Rapcore
- Label: Fluid Recordings

Tha Mexakinz chronology
Tha Mexakinz (1996)	Crossing All Borders (1998)

Professional ratings
Review scores
Source	Rating
Allmusic	4/5 stars

Crossing All Borders is an LP by Latin hip hop duo Tha Mexakinz. It was released on April 14, 1998, by Fluid Recordings.

== Track listing ==
1. "Rain on Your Parade"
2. "La Plaga"
3. "Lose My Cool"
4. "Burnin"
5. "Cok Bak da Hamma!"
6. "2 Many MC's"
7. "Phonkie Melodia III"
8. "Plead Insanity"
