= Zig Zag (Tha Mexakinz album) =

Studio album by Tha Mexakinz
- Released: May 17, 1994
- Recorded: 1993–1994
- Studio: Trax Recording Studio (Hollywood, CA); Track Recording Studio; Kitchen Sync Studios (Hollywood, CA); Skip Saylor Recording (California)
- Genre: Latin hip hop
- Length: 59:07
- Label: Wild West; Mad Sounds
- Producer: Bird; Morris Taft; QD3; Sinful

Tha Mexakinz chronology
Zig Zag (1994)	Tha Mexakinz (1996)

Singles from Zig Zag
- 1. "Phonkie Melodia" Released: December 1993; 2. "Extaseason" Released: 1994

Professional ratings
Review scores
Source	Rating
AllMusic	2.5/5 stars

Zig Zag is the debut studio album by Latin hip hop duo Tha Mexakinz. It was released on May 17, 1994 via Wild West Records and Mad Sounds Recordings. Recording sessions took place at Trax Recording Studio and Kitchen Sync Studios in Hollywood, at Track Recording Studio and at Skip Saylor Recording. Production was handled by member Sinful, as well as Morris Taft, Bird and Quincy Jones III. It features cameo appearances from Mr. Nice Guy, Scrap Dog, Chili & Bean.

== Track listing ==
No.	Title	Writer(s)	Producer(s)	Length
1.	"A Little Sumthin'"	Rudy Archuleta; Rodrigo Navarro	Sinful	3:47
2.	"Welkum 2 da Hood"	Navarro; Archuleta	Sinful; Morris Taft (co.)	4:40
3.	"Cok Bak da Hamma!"	Navarro; Archuleta; Morris Taft	Sinful; Morris Taft	4:31
4.	"Da Joint"	Navarro; Archuleta	Sinful; Morris Taft; Intellek (co.)	5:44
5.	"Interlude, Pt. 1" (featuring Mr. Nice Guy and Scrap Dog)	Navarro; Archuleta; Darryl Coyle Peek; Scrap Dog		3:43
6.	"Buckwhyle Style"	Navarro; Archuleta	Sinful	3:29
7.	"Phonkie Melodia (Remix)"	Archuleta; Navarro; Quincy Jones III	QDIII	3:59
8.	"Da Method"	Navarro; Archuleta	Sinful	4:28
9.	"Extaseason"	Navarro; Archuleta; Taft	Sinful; Morris Taft (co.)	4:11
10.	"Interlude, Pt. 2" (featuring Mr. Nice Guy and Scrap Dog)	Navarro; Archuleta; Peek; Scrap Dog		3:07
11.	"Murdah"	Archuleta; Navarro; Lamont Holbdy	Bird; Morris Taft	4:35
12.	"Push Up n da Wrong 1"	Navarro; Archuleta	Sinful	3:53
13.	"It'z On"	Archuleta; Navarro; Holbdy; Taft	Bird; Morris Taft (co.)	3:40
14.	"Phonkie Melodia"	Archuleta; Navarro; Holbdy	Bird; Morris Taft (co.)	4:00
15.	"Epilogue" (featuring Mr. Nice Guy, Scrap Dog, Chili & Bean)	Navarro; Archuleta; Peek; Scrap Dog; Chili & Bean		1:38
Total length:				59:07

Sample credits

- Track 2 contains a sample from "Covert Action" (written by Wilton Felder) as recorded by The Crusaders.
- Track 4 contains portions of "DWYCK" (written by Keith Elam, Christopher Martin, Greg Mays and Daryl Barnes).
- Track 8 contains a sample from "Funktion at the Junktion" (written by Frederick Long, Edward Holland, Jr. and Lamont Dozier) as recorded by Ramsey Lewis.
- Track 11 contains a sample from "Get Retarded" (written by Craig Mack and Teddy Lee) as recorded by M.C. EZ & Troop.
- Track 12 contains samples from "Faith" (written by S. Lawrence and Teddy Riley) as recorded by Wee Papa Girl Rappers, "Slow Down" (written by Maxwell Dixon, Lorenzo Dechalus and Derek Murphy) as recorded by Brand Nubian, and "6 Minutes of Pleasure" (written by James Todd Smith and Marlon Williams) as recorded by LL Cool J.
- Track 13 contains a sample from "How I Could Just Kill a Man" (written by Louis Freese, Senen Reyes and Lawrence Muggerud) as recorded by Cypress Hill.
- Track 14 contains a sample from "Night Moves" (written by Michael Franks and Michael Small) as recorded by Michael Franks.

== Personnel ==
- Rodrigo "Sinful" Navarro – vocals, programming, producer, arranger, mixing
- Rudy "I-Man" Archuleta – vocals
- Darryl Coyle "Mr. Nice Guy" Peek – vocals (tracks: 5, 10, 15)
- Scrap Dog – vocals (tracks: 5, 10, 15)
- Chili & Bean – vocals (track 15)
- Rodney Lee – keyboards
- Morris Taft – producer, arranger, mixing, executive producer
- Lamont "Bird" Holbdy – producer, programming, mixing
- Quincy Jones III – producer
- Intellek – co-producer
- Stevo Theard – programming, arranger, mixing
- Sean Freehill – engineering, mixing
- Pete Magdaleno – engineering
- Aaron Connor – engineering
- Vini Cirilli – engineering
- Louie Teran – engineering
- Mitch Tobias – photography
