= At the Speed of Life =

Studio album by Xzibit
- Released: October 15, 1996
- Recorded: 1995–1996
- Studio: Tha Concentration Camp (Los Angeles, CA); Ameraycan (North Hollywood, CA); The Compound (Los Angeles, CA)
- Genre: Hardcore hip hop
- Length: 49:14
- Label: Loud; RCA
- Producer: Xzibit (exec.); E-Swift (also exec.); Craig Sherrad; Diamond D; DJ Muggs; DJ Pen One; Saafir; Thayod Ausar

Xzibit chronology
At the Speed of Life (1996)	40 Dayz & 40 Nightz (1998)

Singles from At the Speed of Life
- 1. "Paparazzi" Released: May 27, 1996; 2. "The Foundation" Released: October 19, 1996

Professional ratings
Review scores
Source	Rating
AllMusic	3/5 stars
Muzik	3.5/5 stars
Q	4/5 stars
RapReviews	8.5/10
The Source	3/5 stars

At the Speed of Life is the debut studio album by American rapper Xzibit. It was released on October 15, 1996, through Loud/RCA Records. The recording sessions took place at Tha Concentration Camp and The Compound in Los Angeles and Ameraycan Studios in North Hollywood. The album was produced by Craig Sherrad, E-Swift, Thayod Ausar, Diamond D, DJ Muggs, DJ Pen One, and Saafir. It features guest appearances from Hurricane G, J-Ro, King T, Ras Kass, Saafir, Tash and Ron Hightower.

In the United States, the album made it to number 74 on the Billboard 200 and number 22 on the Top R&B/Hip-Hop Albums charts. It also peaked at number 19 in the Netherlands, number 35 in Switzerland, number 36 in Finland, number 57 in Sweden and number 74 in Germany.

Its lead single, "Paparazzi", peaked at No. 83 on the Billboard Hot 100, No. 39 on the Hot Dance Music/Maxi-Singles Sales, No. 61 on the Hot R&B/Hip-Hop Songs and No. 9 on the Hot Rap Songs in the United States. It found more success in Europe, reaching Top 20 in the Netherlands, Switzerland, Sweden, Germany, Finland and Austria, and received Gold certification by the Bundesverband Musikindustrie. The instrumental version of "Paparazzi" can be heard in the end of "Pax Soprana", the sixth episode of the first season of the crime drama television series The Sopranos. The song was used for the soundtrack to the 2001 video game Tony Hawk's Pro Skater 3.

The song "Eyes May Shine" was released as a promotional single on October 15, 1996, with its remix version featuring Mobb Deep.

The album's second single, "The Foundation", was less successful, only peaking at No. 1 on the Bubbling Under Hot 100, No. 29 on the Hot Dance Music/Maxi-Singles Sales, No. 58 on the Hot R&B/Hip-Hop Songs and No. 16 on the Hot Rap Songs in the United States.

The song "Just Maintain" off of the album appeared in Richard Donner's 1997 film Conspiracy Theory.

== Track listing ==
Credits adapted from the album's liner notes.

No.	Title	Writer(s)	Producer(s)	Length
1.	"Grand Opening" (Interlude)		Craig Sherrad	1:32
2.	"At the Speed of Life"	Alvin Joiner; Eric Banks	Thayod Ausar	3:45
3.	"Just Maintain" (featuring Hurricane Gee)	Joiner; Gloria Rodriguez; Eric Brooks	E-Swift	3:20
4.	"Eyes May Shine"	Joiner; Brooks	E-Swift	3:57
5.	"Positively Negative" (featuring King Tee)	Joiner; Roger McBride; Craig Sherrad	Craig Sherrad	3:36
6.	"Don't Hate Me" (Interlude)		Thayod Ausar	1:31
7.	"Paparazzi"	Joiner; Banks	Thayod Ausar	3:56
8.	"The Foundation"	Joiner; Lawrence Muggerud; William Martin Joel	DJ Muggs	3:55
9.	"Mrs. Crabtree" (Interlude)		E-Swift; Saafir	1:16
10.	"Bird's Eye View" (featuring Catashtraphe and J-Ro)	Joiner; Rico Smith; James Robinson; Joseph Kirkland	Diamond D	4:41
11.	"Hit & Run (Part II)" (featuring Ron Hightower)	Joiner; Sherrad	Craig Sherrad	3:49
12.	"Carry the Weight"	Joiner; Banks; Trevor Jones	Thayod Ausar	4:13
13.	"Plastic Surgery" (featuring Ras Kass and Saafir)	Joiner; John Austin; Reggie Gibson; Brooks	E-Swift	4:40
14.	"Enemies & Friends"	Joiner; James Haynes	DJ Pen One	4:00
15.	"Last Words" (Interlude)		Craig Sherrad	1:00
Total length:				49:14

== Personnel ==
- Alvin "Xzibit" Joiner – vocals, executive producer
- Gloria "Hurricane G" Rodriguez – vocals (track 3)
- Roger "King Tee" McBride – vocals (track 5)
- Rico "Tash" Smith – vocals (track 10)
- James "J-Ro" Robinson – vocals (track 10)
- Ron Hightower – additional vocals (track 11)
- John "Ras Kass" Austin – vocals (track 13)
- Reggie "Saafir" Gibson – vocals (track 13), producer (track 9)
- Craig Sherrad – producer (tracks: 1, 5, 11, 15)
- Eric "Thayod" Banks – producer (tracks: 2, 6, 7, 12), engineering (tracks: 1–6, 9–15)
- Eric "E-Swift" Brooks – producer (tracks: 3, 4, 9, 13), engineering (tracks: 1–6, 9–15), executive producer
- Lawrence "DJ Muggs" Muggerud – producer & engineering (track 8)
- Joseph "Diamond D" Kirkland – producer (track 10)
- James "DJ Pen One" Haynes – producer (track 14)
- Ross Donaldson – engineering (track 7), mixing (track 8)
- Jean-Marie Horvat – mixing (tracks: 1–7, 9–15)
- Brian "Big Bass" Gardner – mastering
- Ola Kudu – art direction, layout
- Brian "B+" Cross – photography
- Noa Ochi – album coordinator
- Bill "Bigga B" Operin – A&R
- Che Harris – A&R
- Lisa Duvernay – A&R

== Charts ==
=== Weekly charts ===
Chart (1996–97)	Peak position
Dutch Albums (Album Top 100)	19
Finnish Albums (Suomen virallinen lista)	36
German Albums (Offizielle Top 100)	74
Swedish Albums (Sverigetopplistan)	57
Swiss Albums (Schweizer Hitparade)	35
US Billboard 200	74
US Top R&B/Hip-Hop Albums (Billboard)	22

=== Year-end charts ===
Chart (1997)	Position
Dutch Albums (Album Top 100)	99
