= Pax Soprana =

- The Sopranos episode
- Episode no.: Season 1 Episode 6
- Directed by: Alan Taylor
- Written by: Frank Renzulli
- Cinematography by: Alik Sakharov
- Production code: 106
- Original air date: February 14, 1999
- Running time: 50 minutes

Episode chronology
← Previous "College"	Next → "Down Neck"
- The Sopranos season 1

"Pax Soprana" is the sixth episode of the HBO original series The Sopranos. It was written by Frank Renzulli, directed by Alan Taylor and originally aired on February 14, 1999.

== Starring ==
- James Gandolfini as Tony Soprano
- Lorraine Bracco as Dr. Jennifer Melfi
- Edie Falco as Carmela Soprano
- Michael Imperioli as Christopher Moltisanti
- Dominic Chianese as Corrado Soprano, Jr.
- Vincent Pastore as Pussy Bonpensiero
- Steven Van Zandt as Silvio Dante *
- Tony Sirico as Paulie Gualtieri *
- Robert Iler as Anthony Soprano, Jr. *
- Jamie-Lynn Sigler as Meadow Soprano *
- Nancy Marchand as Livia Soprano

* = credit only

=== Guest starring ===
- John Heard as Vin Makazian
- Jerry Adler as Hesh Rabkin

==== Also guest starring ====
- Al Sapienza as Mikey Palmice
- Paul Schulze as Father Phil
- Oksana Lada as Irina Peltsin
- Tony Darrow as Larry Boy Barese
- George Loros as Raymond Curto
- Joseph Badalucco Jr. as Jimmy Altieri
- Vince Curatola as Johnny Sack
- Freddy Bastone as Batman
- William Conn as Old Man
- Maurizio Corbino as "John" the Waiter
- Sylvia Kauders as Old Woman
- Salem Ludwig as Mr. Capri
- Prianga Pieris as Mechanic
- Salvatore Piro as Sammy Grigio
- Christopher Quinn as Rusty Irish
- Dave Salerno as Card Player
- Frank Santorelli as Georgie
- Donn Swaby as Guy on Bridge
- Sonny Zito as Eggie

== Synopsis ==
Mikey beats up the leader of a card game that had been protected by Jimmy Altieri, a DiMeo family capo. While Uncle Junior is being fitted for a new suit, his tailor tells him that his 14-year-old grandson died by suicide after taking drugs sold to him by Rusty Irish, who works for DiMeo capo "Larry Boy" Barese. Junior has him killed, even though he is Larry Boy's top earner.

Prompted by Livia, Junior tells Hesh that he must now, for the first time, make payments to him. Hesh goes to Tony, who goes to Johnny Sack, the underboss in New York's Lupertazzi crime family. They negotiate with Junior, who reduces his demands, and Hesh agrees to pay. The other DiMeo capos are resentful because Junior is keeping too much money for himself. Tony speaks to Junior, who agrees to pass Hesh's tribute money down to his capos. Tony gives his share of this money back to Hesh.

Tony loses his libido as a side effect of his medication. Carmela, and Tony's mistress Irina, become very discontented. Tony also starts having erotic dreams about Dr. Melfi and believes he is in love with her. He tries to kiss her during a session, then has her aging car stolen and returned with a new starter. Carmela admits to Tony that she is jealous that his therapist can help him but she cannot. Tony tells Carmela that she is his life, and they reconcile.

Junior celebrates his promotion to boss with a banquet. A waiter has a button camera and takes photos for the FBI, which are affixed to a bulletin board mapping out the hierarchy of the DiMeo family.

== First appearance ==
- John "Johnny Sack" Sacrimoni: The underboss of the Lupertazzi crime family, one of the Five Families of New York City.

== Deceased ==
- Rusty Irish: Thrown off the Great Falls Bridge by Mikey Palmice with help of Joseph Marino on orders from Uncle Junior.

== Title reference ==
The title is a reference to Pax Romana (Roman peace) and related terms (Pax Britannica, Pax Americana, etc.), which refer to a lack of conflict over a long period of time due to the unchallenged rule of a single dominant power, which Tony hopes to achieve within the Soprano family. Pax Romana was an era initiated by the Roman emperor Augustus, mentioned by Tony in his conversation with Uncle Junior.

== Cultural references ==
- Tony speaks to Junior about Octavian, later the Roman Emperor Augustus.
- Livia alludes to Rudyard Kipling's poem "Gunga Din". He was a servant who carried water to soldiers in need.
- In the episode's final scene, sitting to Tony Soprano's left in the banquet hall is real-life Gambino crime family associate Anthony Corozzo, brother of Gambino capo Nicholas Corozzo and former Gambino consigliere, Joseph Corozzo.

== Music ==
- The song played when Mikey and his boys shake down a poker game that is under Jimmy Altieri's protection is "Willy Nilly" by Rufus Thomas.
- The song played when Mr. Capri fits Junior for a new suit is "When the Boy in Your Arms" by Connie Francis.
- While Junior visits Livia at Green Grove, some of the other seniors are singing to "I Whistle a Happy Tune".
- The song played as Christopher walks into the card game at Satriale's is "Coconut Boogaloo," by Medeski Martin & Wood.
- The song played during Tony's first dream featuring Dr. Melfi is "What Time Is It?" by The Jive Five.
- The song played when Tony meets with Johnny Sack during his anniversary dinner with Carmela is "Pampa" by Gustavo Santaolalla.
- The song played during the final montage and end credits is an instrumental version of "Paparazzi" by Xzibit, a song derived from Gabriel Fauré's "Pavane".

== Filming locations ==
Listed in order of first appearance:

- Harrison, New Jersey
- West Orange, New Jersey
- Satriale's Pork Store in Kearny, New Jersey
- West Caldwell, New Jersey
- Paterson, New Jersey
- The Great Falls in Paterson, New Jersey
- Long Island City, Queens
- Glen Head, New York

== Reception ==
In 2015, Alan Sepinwall argued that "Pax Soprana" is "so fraught with discomfort and complications with both family and Family (and whatever separate sphere Melfi occupies) that it's nearly as compelling in its own right as last week's Very Special Episode." Emily St. James of The A.V. Club wrote that the episode "isn't a tremendous hour of television like 'College' was, but it may be more significant."
