= Ron Hightower =

American pornographic actor (born 1966)

- Born: Ronald Hightower; January 25, 1966 (age 60); Los Angeles, California, U.S.
- Height: 6 ft 5 in (1.96 m)

Ronald Hightower (born January 25, 1966, in Los Angeles, California) is an American adult-mainstream director who began his career as a pornographic actor. He has also directed music videos for various hip-hop recording artists, particularly rappers.

== Early life and career ==
Born in Los Angeles, Hightower entered the adult entertainment world in New York City after working as an exotic dancer in the early 1990s. His good looks and muscular physique soon caught the eye of West Coast studio executives who recognized his potential as a top sex star, and they wasted no time in tempting him with better and more prominent roles.

== Career in adult films ==
Arriving at the San Fernando Valley-based porn scene at a time when there were very few black men in the business who were actual celebrities (and when most interracial movies consisted of showing Caucasian men having sex with African American women), Hightower rapidly gained popularity as a natural born performer who always pleased his female co-stars, and his early appearances in productions like White Men Can't Hump and the Dark Alleys series (both 1992) were well received by many fans of black themed and interracial erotica. He also displayed much talent as a hard-working director early on in his career and began directing his first of many movies almost immediately after he had begun performing, starting with Dark Alleys 8 (also 1992).

Hightower had often made public his frustration with what he felt were stereotypical depictions of black men in pornography, and at the risk of jeopardizing his career he would take the opportunity during interviews to expose the restrictions that were placed by studio heads at the time on black actors whose female partners were white. Like his contemporary and friendly rival, Sean Michaels, he worked hard to eliminate negative stereotypes of African Americans in the business and also to break new ground for them.

== Directorial career ==
In 1996 Hightower retired from performing sex in front of the cameras to become a full-time adult film director, later to pursue work for mainstream productions. By 1997, he was dubbed by one book as the "king of the black porno market".

=== Music videos ===
As a mainstream director, Hightower has produced and directed music videos for such recording artists such as Above The Law, Gang Starr, New Child, and Tupac Shakur, for whom he directed the music video 'How Do U Want It'.
