= I'm Not Playin' =

Studio album by Ultimate Force
- Released: March 26, 2007
- Recorded: 1988–1989
- Genre: Hip-hop
- Length: 52:48
- Label: Strong City/Traffic Records; TEG-76528
- Producer: Diamond D Jazzy Jay

Diamond D chronology
The Diamond Mine (2005)	I'm Not Playin' (2007)	The Huge Hefner Chronicles (2008)

Singles from I'm Not Playin'
- 1. "I'm Not Playing" Released: 1989; 2. "Girls" Released: 2007

Professional ratings
Review scores
Source	Rating
Allmusic	4.5/5 stars
RapReviews.com	4/5 stars

I'm Not Playin' is the only album recorded by the hip-hop duo Ultimate Force, which consisted of emcee Master Rob and DJ-producer Diamond D. The group was discovered and sponsored by Jazzy Jay in the late 1980s, and the album was recorded in his studio in the Bronx, New York, between 1988 and 1990. Ultimate Force was signed to Strong City at the time, but due to label politics and the shuttering of distributor Uni Records, the album was shelved and for the longest time the only available material from the duo was the 12" single "I'm Not Playin'", considered somewhat of an underground classic.

The rights of the Strong City catalogue were eventually acquired by Traffic Entertainment Group, and the album was finally released in the middle of 2007. I'm Not Playin' was produced by Diamond D and all vocals were handled by Master Rob, Diamond D had not yet started rhyming. Guest appearances come from a young Fat Joe who appeared on two songs, which are actually the earliest recordings of his. The CD release is a double-disc that includes the accapellas and instrumentals of all of the album's tracks.

== Track listing ==
#	Title	Producer(s)	Performer (s)
1	"Another Hit"	Diamond D, Jazzy Jay	Master Rob
2	"C'Mon"	Diamond D	Fat Joe, Master Rob
3	"Girls"	Diamond D	Master Rob
4	"I Gotta Go"	Diamond D	Master Rob
5	"I'm in Effect"	Diamond D	Master Rob
6	"Oh, Shit"	Diamond D	Gismo, Saladeem, Fat Joe, Kid Seville, Master Rob
7	"I'm Not Playin'"	Jazzy Jay	Master Rob
8	"One of the All-Time Greats"	Diamond D, Jazzy Jay	Master Rob
9	"Revolution of the Mind"	Diamond D	Master Rob
10	"Smooth as Suede"	Diamond D	Master Rob
11	"Supreme Diamond D"	Diamond D, Jazzy Jay	Master Rob
12	"Tuff (So Damn)"	Diamond D	Master Rob
