= The Huge Hefner Chronicles =

Studio album by Diamond D
- Released: October 14, 2008
- Recorded: 2007–2008
- Genre: Hip-hop
- Length: 35:38
- Label: Babygrande Records; 534 900
- Producer: Diamond D DJ Scratch; Nottz; Illmind; Jesse West

Diamond D chronology
I'm Not Playin' (2007)	The Huge Hefner Chronicles (2008)	The Diam Piece (2014)

Singles from The Huge Hefner Chronicles
- 1. "D-I-A-M-O-N-D"

Professional ratings
Review scores
Source	Rating
HipHopDX	3.5/5 stars
RapReviews.com	3.5/5 stars

The Huge Hefner Chronicles is the third studio album by American producer/MC Diamond D. Released on October 14, 2008, this album is different from his previous works in the way that it features a wide range of different producers rather than Diamond crafting the beats himself like on previous releases. Diamond says the inspiration to do make an album with other producers came from the late producer/MC J Dilla who made a similar album, Pay Jay, for MCA Records that got scrapped.

== Track listing ==
#	Title	Producer(s)	Performer (s)
1	"Intro"		Fat Joe
2	"U Can't Be Me"	DJ Scratch	Diamond D
3	"D-I-A-M-O-N-D"	Nottz	Diamond D
4	"Don't Beg"	Illmind	Diamond D
5	"Baby"	Anthony Accurate	Diamond D, Jawz of Life
6	"Good Tymez"	Diamond D	Diamond D, K-Terror, Blake Carrington
7	"I Getz It In"	Cook	Diamond D
8	"Get Up"	Jesse West	Diamond D
9	"It'll Be Alright"	Def Jef	Diamond D
10	"When Ur Hot Ur Hot"	Diamond D	Diamond D, Sadat X, Stacy Epps
11	"I Wanna Leave"	Diamond D	Diamond D, Crawfish
12	"Bad/Good"	Anthony Accurate	Diamond D
