= Art n' Soul =

American contemporary R&B group

- Also known as: Art 'N Soul
- Origin: Oakland, California, U.S.
- Genres: R&B
- Years active: 1995–1999
- Label: Big Beat
- Past members: Sam Bostic; Rodney Lattrel Evans; Dion Riley

Art n' Soul is an American contemporary R&B group that was active in the mid-1990s. The band consisted of Sam Bostic (lead vocals, bass, and keyboards), Rodney Lattrel Evans (keyboards) and Dion Riley (drums).

Prior to forming Art n' Soul, Bostic attempted a solo career under Atlantic Records with his 1985 debut album Circuitry. After the album stalled, he turned to production for other artists such as E-40, The Conscious Daughters, 2Pac and Master P.

Tony! Toni! Toné! drummer Timothy Christian Riley helped the trio secure a recording contract with Atlantic Records subsidiary Big Beat Records to release their 1996 debut Touch of Soul. Their debut album yielded two singles: "Ever Since You Went Away" and "All My Luv".

== Discography ==
=== Albums ===
Year	Album	Peak chart positions	
Year	Album	U.S. R&B	U.S. Heatseekers
1996	Touch of Soul	36	27

=== Singles ===
Year	Song	Peak chart positions		Album
Year	Song	U.S. Hot 100	U.S. R&B	Album
1996	"Ever Since You Went Away"	72	19	Touch of Soul
1996	"All My Luv"	—	72	Touch of Soul
