= What U See Is What U Get =

Single by Xzibit

from the album 40 Dayz & 40 Nightz
- B-side: "3 Card Molly"
- Released: 1998
- Recorded: 1997
- Genre: Gangsta rap
- Length: 4:26
- Label: Loud
- Songwriter: Alvin Joiner
- Producers: Jesse West; Xzibit (Co-produced)

Xzibit singles chronology
"Eyes May Shine" (1996)	"What U See Is What U Get" (1998)	"Los Angeles Times" (1998)

"What U See Is What U Get" is the first single from Xzibit's second album, 40 Dayz & 40 Nightz. In its first week the song peaked at #50 on the Billboard Hot 100, being Xzibit's highest charting single. It peaked at #3 on Hot Rap Singles, his highest on that chart.

== Music video ==
A music video directed by Gregory Dark was filmed in Los Angeles. The deceptively simplistic premise of the video is Xzibit's trek to a nearby shop after being asked to buy some milk. On his way, Xzibit greets several friends, briefly performs in a local concert and even finds a dropped one-hundred-dollar bill. However, he also experiences various chaotic incidents including a carjacking, a bombing, a shooting, and a store looting, walking past all of the events unshaken. In the end, Xzibit successfully purchases the milk and returns home, only to be told to go back out to purchase hot sauce as well. The video closes with a dedication to then-recently-deceased music video director Michael Lucero. Lucero's production company What You See Is What You Get(?UC-IS-?U-GET) produced the music videos for Xzibit's songs "Paparazzi" and "The Foundation", both directed by Lucero. Flavor Flav, King Tee, Tha Liks, and Xzibit's son Tre Capital make cameo appearances in the video. The music video peaked at #1 for 6 weeks on BET's Rap City Top 10 countdown.

== Tracks ==
12"

1. "What U See Is What U Get" - 5:09
2. "What U See Is What U Get" (instrumental) - 5:09
3. "3 Card Molly" - 3:58
4. "3 Card Molly" (instrumental) - 3:58

Promo

1. "What U See Is What U Get" w/o intro (clean) - 4:21
2. "What U See Is What U Get" w/ intro (clean) - 4:31
3. "What U See Is What U Get" (LP version) - 5:12
4. "What U See Is What U Get" (instrumental) - 5:09

== Chart history ==
Chart
US Billboard Hot 100	50
US Hot R&B/Hip-Hop Songs (Billboard)	34
US Hot Rap Songs (Billboard)	3

=== Year-end charts ===
End of year chart (1998)	Position
Billboard Hot Rap Singles	33
