= Paparazzi (Xzibit song) =

Single by Xzibit

from the album At the Speed of Life
- Released: May 27, 1996
- Recorded: 1995
- Studio: Ameraycan (North Hollywood, Los Angeles)
- Genre: Hip hop; mafioso rap
- Length: 3:56
- Label: Loud, RCA
- Songwriters: Alvin Joiner, Thayod Ausar
- Producer: Thayod Ausar

Xzibit singles chronology
"Paparazzi" (1996)	"The Foundation" (1996)

"Paparazzi" is a song by Xzibit, issued as the lead single from his debut album At the Speed of Life. The song's official music video was directed by Michael Lucero.

The songs samples Barbra Streisand's "Pavane (Vocalise)", itself a version of Gabriel Fauré's Pavane.

The song is used for the soundtrack of Tony Hawk's Pro Skater 3. The instrumental version of "Paparazzi" was used to close "Pax Soprana", the sixth episode of the first season of The Sopranos.

== Charts ==
=== Weekly charts ===
Chart (1996)	Peak position
Austria (Ö3 Austria Top 40)	20
Belgium (Ultratip Bubbling Under Flanders)	9
Belgium (Ultratop 50 Wallonia)	40
Europe (European Hot 100 Singles)	26
Europe (Eurochart Hot 100)	14
Finland (Suomen virallinen lista)	13
Germany (GfK)	11
Netherlands (Dutch Top 40)	4
Netherlands (Single Top 100)	5
Sweden (Sverigetopplistan)	7
Switzerland (Schweizer Hitparade)	6
US Billboard Hot 100	83
US Hot Dance Music/Maxi-Singles Sales (Billboard)	39
US Hot R&B/Hip-Hop Songs (Billboard)	61
US Hot Rap Songs (Billboard)	9

=== Year-end charts ===
Chart (1996)	Position
Sweden (Sverigetopplistan)	41
Chart (1997)	Position
Netherlands (Dutch Top 40)	62
Netherlands (Single Top 100)	83
Romania (Romanian Top 100)	96
Switzerland (Schweizer Hitparade)	46

== Certifications ==
Region	Certification	Certified units/sales
Germany (BVMI)	Gold	250,000^{^}
^{^} Shipments figures based on certification alone.
