= 40 Dayz & 40 Nightz =

Studio album by Xzibit
- Released: August 25, 1998
- Recorded: 1997–1998
- Studio: Sound Castle (Los Angeles, CA); N-House Studioz (Studio City, CA); Record One (Studio City, CA); Track Record, Inc. (North Hollywood, CA); The Enterprise (Burbank, CA); Area51 (Los Angeles, CA)
- Genre: West Coast hip hop; gangsta rap; hardcore hip hop
- Length: 57:40
- Label: Loud; RCA
- Producer: Sir Jinx (also exec.); Xzibit (also exec.); A Kid Called Roots; Bud'da; DJ Pen One; E-Swift; Jesse West; Mel-Man; Montage One; Soopafly; The Glove; Pokets; Thayod Ausar

Xzibit chronology
At the Speed of Life (1996)	40 Dayz & 40 Nightz (1998)	Restless (2000)

Singles from 40 Dayz & 40 Nightz
- 1. "What U See Is What U Get" Released: July 6, 1998; 2. "Los Angeles Times" Released: September 22, 1998; 3. "Pussy Pop" Released: November 2, 1998; 4. "3 Card Molly" Released: November 17, 1998

Professional ratings
Review scores
Source	Rating
AllMusic	4/5 stars
laut.de	5/5 stars
RapReviews	9.5/10
The Source	3.5/5 stars

40 Dayz & 40 Nightz is the second studio album by American rapper Xzibit. It was released on August 25, 1998, through Loud Records and RCA Records. Recording sessions took place at Sound Castle and at Area51 in Los Angeles, at N-House Studioz and at Record One in Studio City, at Track Record, Inc. in North Hollywood, and at The Enterprise in Burbank. Production was handled by Sir Jinx, Bud'da, A Kid Called Roots, DJ Pen One, E-Swift, Jesse West, Mel-Man, Montage One, Soopafly, The Glove and Xzibit himself. It features guest appearances from fellow Likwit Crew teammates Montage One, Defari, King Tee and Tha Alkaholiks, and the Golden State Project members Ras Kass and Saafir, as well as West Coast rapper Jayo Felony and Staten Island rapper Method Man of the Wu-Tang Clan. The album debuted at number 58 on the Billboard 200 and number 14 on the Top R&B/Hip-Hop Albums chart in the United States, and at number 32 on the UK Hip Hop and R&B Albums Chart.

The album featured four singles "What U See Is What U Get", "Los Angeles Times", "Pussy Pop" and "3 Card Molly". Its lead single, "What U See Is What U Get", which peaked at No. 50 on the Billboard Hot 100, earned Xzibit some of the highest charting placements in his career. The album's second single, "Los Angeles Times", was previously featured on the soundtrack to 1997 film Soul in the Hole.

== Track listing ==
No.	Title	Writer(s)	Producer(s)	Length
1.	"Intro" (The Last Night)		Sir Jinx; Xzibit (co.)	1:03
2.	"Chamber Music"	Alvin Joiner; Anthony Wheaton; Johnny Rogers	Sir Jinx; Xzibit (co.)	4:23
3.	"3 Card Molly" (featuring Ras Kass and Saafir)	Joiner; John Austin; Reggie Gibson; Stephen Anderson	Bud'da	3:55
4.	"What U See Is What U Get"	Joiner; Jesse West	Jesse West; Xzibit (co.)	5:08
5.	"Handle Your Business" (featuring Defari)	Joiner; Duane Johnson; James Haynes; Eric Banks	DJ Pen One; Thayod Ausar (co.)	4:15
6.	"Nobody Sound Like Me" (featuring Montage One)	Joiner; Terrance Taylor; Patrick Lawrence; Pam Sawyer; Leon Ware	A Kid Called Roots	3:38
7.	"Pussy Pop" (featuring Jayo Felony and Method Man)	Joiner; James Savage; Clifford Smith; Priest Brooks	Soopafly	3:18
8.	"Chronic Keeping 101" (Interlude)		Sir Jinx; Xzibit	2:00
9.	"Shroomz"	Joiner; Wheaton	Sir Jinx; Xzibit (co.)	3:01
10.	"Focus"	Joiner; Chris Taylor	D.J. Glove	3:30
11.	"Jason" (48 Months Interlude)		Sir Jinx; Xzibit	1:26
12.	"Deeper"	Joiner; Anderson	Bud'da	2:58
13.	"Los Angeles Times"	Joiner; Melvin Bradford	Mel-Man	4:24
14.	"Inside Job"	Joiner; Wheaton	Sir Jinx; Pokets (co.); Xzibit (co.)	3:10
15.	"Let It Rain" (featuring Tha Alkaholiks and King Tee)	Joiner; Rico Smith; James Robinson; Roger McBride; Eric Brooks	E-Swift	5:36
16.	"Recycled Assassins" (featuring Montage One)	Joiner; Taylor; Bob James	Montageone	4:14
17.	"Outro"		Sir Jinx; Nathaniel D. Joiner (co.)	1:14
Total length:				57:40

Bonus Track
No.	Title	Writer(s)	Producer(s)	Length
18.	"Don't Let the Money Make You" (featuring King Tee and Soopafly)	Joiner; McBride; Brooks	Sir Jinx	5:19

Sample credits

- Track 6 contains a sample from "If I Ever Lose This Heaven" by Quincy Jones.
- Track 9 contains excerpt from "Funky Worm" by Ohio Players.
- Track 16 contains excerpt from "Nautilus".

== Personnel ==
- Alvin "Xzibit" Joiner – vocals, co-producer (tracks: 1, 2, 4, 9, 14), producer (tracks: 8, 11), executive producer
- Anthony "Sir Jinx" Wheaton – producer (tracks: 1, 2, 8, 9, 11, 14, 17), engineering (tracks: 2, 9, 14), co-executive producer
- Richard "Segal" Huredia – engineering (tracks: 1–6, 9, 10, 12, 14–17)
- "Uncle" Johnny Rogers – additional music (track 2)
- John "Ras Kass" Austin – vocals (track 3)
- Reggie "Saafir" Gibson – vocals (track 3)
- Stephen "Bud'da" Anderson – producer (tracks: 3, 12), voice over (track 14)
- Greg Burns – assistant engineering (track 3), engineering (track 5)
- Jesse West – producer (track 4)
- Duane "Defari Herut" Johnson – vocals (track 5)
- James "DJ Pen One" Haynes – producer (track 5)
- Eric "Thayod" Banks – co-producer (track 5), beat (track 8)
- Terrance "Montageone" Taylor – vocals (tracks: 6, 16), producer (track 16)
- Patrick "A Kid Called Roots" Lawrence – producer (track 6)
- James "Jayo Felony" Savage – vocals (track 7)
- Clifford "Method Man" Smith – vocals (track 7)
- Priest "Soopafly" Brooks – producer (track 7)
- Dave Aaron – engineering (track 7)
- Chris "The Glove" Taylor – producer (track 10)
- Eric "E-Swift" Brooks – beat (track 11), producer (track 15)
- Melvin "Mel-Man" Bradford – producer (track 13)
- Jean-Marie Horvat – engineering (track 13)
- Trini Alvarez – engineering (track 13)
- Pokets – co-producer (track 14)
- Rico "Tash" Smith – vocals (track 15)
- James "J-Ro" Robinson – vocals (track 15)
- Roger "King Tee" McBride – vocals (track 15)
- Nathaniel D. Joiner – co-producer (track 17)
- Eddy Schreyer – mastering
- Gene Grimaldi – mastering
- Farid "Fredwreck" Nassar – digital editing
- Bill "Bigga B" Operin – A&R direction
- Ché Harris – A&R coordination
- Laurie Marks – A&R coordination
- Noa Ochi – project coordinator
- Ola Kudu – creative direction, design, layout
- Dean Karr – photography
- Franck Chevalier – styling
- Suave Management – management

== Charts ==
Chart (1998)	Peak position
UK R&B Albums (OCC)	32
US Billboard 200	58
US Top R&B Albums (Billboard)	14
