= The Foundation (song) =

Single by Xzibit

from the album At the Speed of Life
- Released: October 19, 1996
- Recorded: 1996
- Genre: West Coast hip hop
- Length: 3:53
- Label: Loud
- Songwriter(s): Joiner; Lawrence Muggerud; Billy Joel
- Producer(s): DJ Muggs

Xzibit singles chronology
"Paparazzi" (1996)	"The Foundation" (1996)	"Eyes May Shine" (1996)

"The Foundation" is the second single from Xzibit's debut album At the Speed of Life and also appeared on the soundtrack to the film Hurricane Streets. Xzibit dedicated this song to his one-year-old son.

The song's official music video (directed by Michael Lucero) shows footage of Xzibit and his son.

DJ Muggs of Cypress Hill produced the track. The single charted at number 58 on the Hot R&B Singles chart and number 16 on the Hot Rap Singles chart.

== Charts ==
Chart (1996)	Peak position
US Bubbling Under Hot 100 Singles (Billboard)	1
US Dance Singles Sales (Billboard)	29
US Hot R&B/Hip-Hop Songs (Billboard)	58
US Hot Rap Songs (Billboard)	16
