= Tha Mexakinz =

Latin rap duo

- Origin: Long Beach, California, United States
- Genres: Hip Hop
- Years active: Early 1990s–present
- Labels: Mad Sounds/Motown, Wild West
- Members: Rudy "Capitol I-Man" Archuleta; Rodrigo "Sinful" Navarro
- Past members: Manuel "Cashmiro" Navarro

Tha Mexakinz are a Latin rap duo from Long Beach, California, who released three albums in the 1990s on Wild West Records. The first LP, "Zig Zag", was distributed by Wild West/Mad Sounds/Motown. Wild West was also affiliated with American Recordings.

== History ==
Tha Mexakinz comprises Long Beach, California MCs Rudy "Capitol I-Man" Archuleta and Rodrigo "Sinful". They were initially signed to Motown Records sublabel Mad Sounds in 1993, becoming the first Latin artists to be signed to Motown. The group's debut single "Phonkie Melodia" reached #32 on the Billboard Maxi-Singles sales chart in 1994. They gained a strong underground following among both hip hop and alternative rock fans for their bilingual rhymes. With their third album, the duo incorporated elements of alternative rock and ska punk into their sound.

The duo are still working together, and in 2006, they appeared at the Los Angeles Hip Hop & Reggaeton Fest. In 2009, Tha Mexakinz added third member Manuel "Cashmiro" Navarro. Together the trio began recording new tracks and appeared at several underground shows. By 2010 they had recorded enough material that they started to work on a new album that was set to feature production by respected and well known West Coast Producers such as DJ Khalil, Focus, Dayone, and Thayod Ausar. In 2011 a video for the track titled "On My Way (Cumbia De Los Vagos)" was released through BadFame Media. By 2012 work on the new album had been halted and Cashmiro left the group due to creative differences as well as other life events. In 2013 the original duo of Tha Mexakinz began working on another new album; however, again, the project was put on hold.

In 2009, Archuleta was charged with felony sexual assault including two counts of forced digital penetration, two counts of false imprisonment and one count of making threats. The trial began on 1 July 2009, and on 8 July he was cleared of the sexual assault charges but found guilty of making criminal threats to kill his former girlfriend and her entire family. On 23 July he was sentenced to five years' probation after pleading guilty to the criminal threats charge.

== Discography ==
=== Albums ===
- Zig Zag (1994)
- Tha Mexakinz (1996)
- Crossing All Borders (1998)

=== Singles ===
- "Phonkie Melodia" (1993) Mad Sounds/Motown
- "Extaseason" (1994) Mad Sounds/Motown
- "Confessions: Hell Don't Pay" (1995) Wild West
- "Burnin' Hot" (1996) Wild West
- "Problems" (1997) Wild West
- "The Wake Up Show" (1997) Wild West
- "On My Way (Cumbia De Los Vagos)" (2011)
