= Xzibit =

American rapper and actor (born 1974)

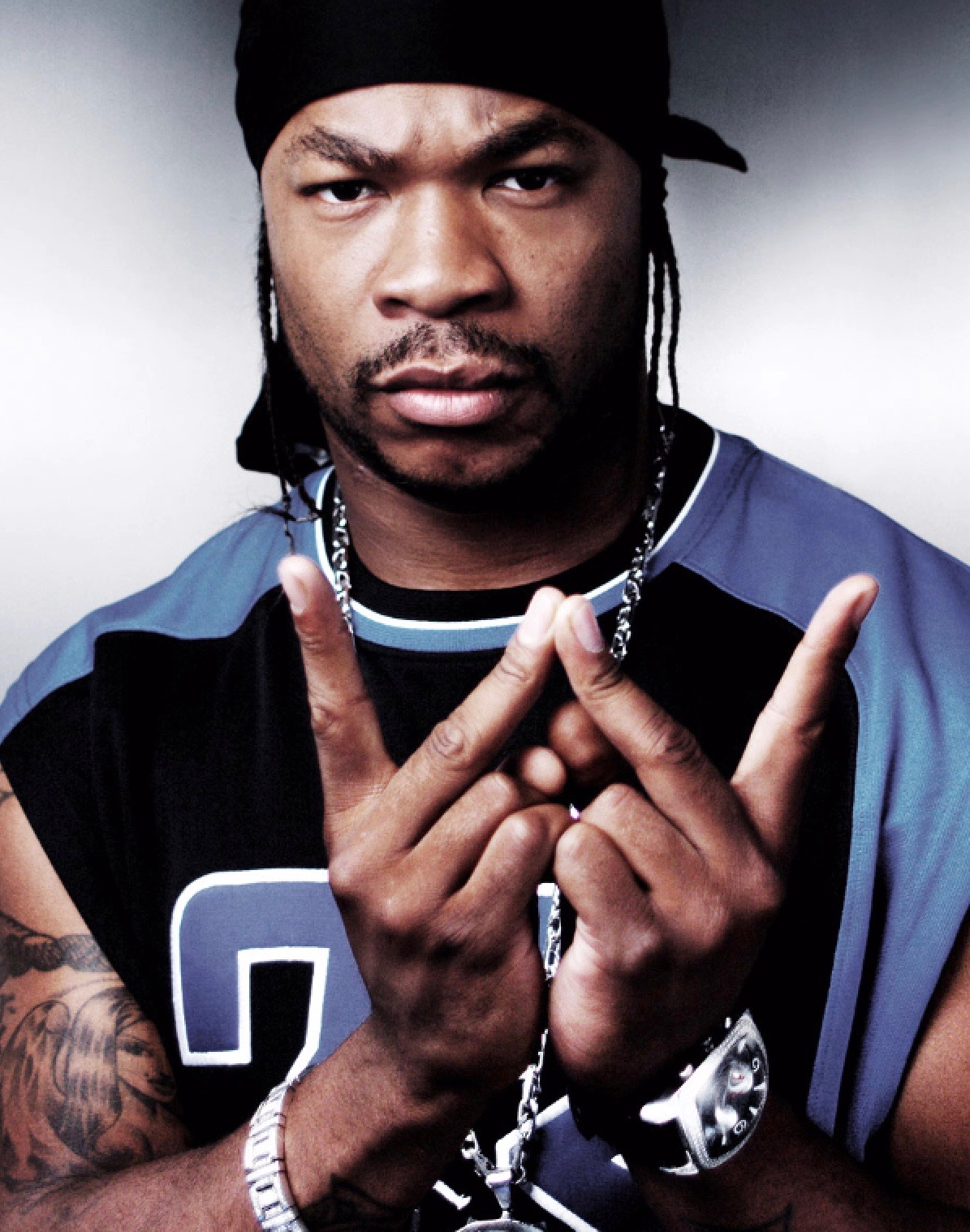
- Xzibit in 2005

Background information
- Also known as: Exhibit A; X to the Z; Wow Alvin
- Born: Alvin Nathaniel Joiner; September 18, 1974 (age 52); Detroit, Michigan, U.S.
- Origin: Los Angeles, California, U.S.
- Education: Cibola High School
- Genre: West Coast hip-hop
- Occupations: Rapper; actor; songwriter; television presenter; radio personality; record executive
- Works: Xzibit discography
- Years active: 1992–present
- Labels: Open Bar; EMI; Extreme; E1; Hoo-Bangin'; Green Back; Sony BMG; Goliath; Columbia; SRC; Epic; RCA; Loud; Sony
- Member of: Serial Killers; The Golden State Project; D.P.G.C.
- Formerly of: Likwit Crew; Strong Arm Steady
- Spouse: Krista Joiner (m. 2014; sep. 2021)
- Children: 3, including Tre Capital

Alvin Nathaniel Joiner (born September 18, 1974), better known by his stage name Xzibit (pronounced "exhibit"), is an American rapper, actor, television presenter, radio personality, and record executive. He began his musical career in 1992, and signed with Loud Records, an imprint of RCA Records to release his debut studio album, At the Speed of Life (1996). Its lead single, "Paparazzi", peaked at number 83 on the Billboard Hot 100. His second album, 40 Dayz & 40 Nightz (1998), was met with similar reception and spawned the single "What U See Is What U Get."

His success caught the attention of rapper Dr. Dre, who served as the executive producer for Xzibit's next two albums; his third, Restless (2000), was further commercially-oriented and peaked at number 12 on the Billboard 200. He then left Loud Records in favor of Columbia Records for the release of his fourth album Man vs. Machine (2002), which peaked at number three on the chart. His next albums, Weapons of Mass Destruction (2004) and Full Circle (2006), preceded a brief public hiatus; he returned for the release of his seventh studio album, Napalm (2012). Since 2013, he performs as a member of the hip-hop supergroup Serial Killers.

Xzibit has also gained fame as an actor and television presenter, having hosted the reality television program Pimp My Ride during the 2000s. In his acting career, he played Shyne Johnson in the television series Empire. He has also starred in the films Hoodwinked (2005), Gridiron Gang (2006), The X-Files: I Want to Believe (2008), Bad Lieutenant: Port of Call New Orleans (2009), and Sun Dogs (2017).

== Career ==
=== 1992–1999: Early career and At the Speed of Life ===
Xzibit started to rap at 14, then under the pseudonym "Exhibit A". He lived in Detroit, Michigan, until elementary school age. Following the death of his mother, his father remarried and the family moved to Albuquerque, New Mexico. He attended Elementary and Middle School on Albuquerque's West Side, but by high school found himself getting into so much trouble that he was self-reportedly kicked out of nearly every school in the Albuquerque Public School System. His father, frustrated by his behavior, drove him to the office of the Marine Corps recruiter, where Xzibit swore that he would get his GED. While he successfully completed the program at TVI (now CNM), he continued to get into trouble. In an effort to break the cycle of violence and crime he found himself in, he moved to Los Angeles in his late teens. His first appearance on a professional record was in February 1995 on The Alkaholiks' Coast II Coast, song "Hit and Run". He also appeared on King Tee's IV Life "Free Style Ghetto" shortly after. After touring with Likwit Crew, Xzibit signed to Loud Records and released his debut album At the Speed of Life in October 1996, which peaked at number 74 on the Billboard 200 and reached 38 on the Canadian Albums Chart. The album produced his debut single "Paparazzi", which peaked at number 86 on the Billboard Hot 100. It was more successful in mainland Europe, particularly in Germany, where it peaked at number 11 on the German Singles Chart.

After spending the next two years building his reputation as a West Coast underground artist and touring with the Likwit Crew, he released his second album, 40 Dayz & 40 Nightz on August 25, 1998, which charted in the U.S. at number 58 and at number 50 in Canada. It spawned four singles, the most successful being "What U See Is What U Get" charting at number 50 in the United States. With his growing following in the West, he caught the eye of rapper and producer Dr. Dre, who secured him high-profile guest spots, such as joining Snoop Dogg on the Dre-produced hit "Bitch Please" of his album No Limit Top Dogg, and appearing on Dr. Dre's 6× platinum album 2001, on the songs "Lolo", "Some L.A. Niggaz", and "What's the Difference" with Eminem. He closed the year 1999 with his acting debut, starring in The Breaks.

=== 1999–2003: Rise to prominence and Restless ===
Xzibit started the new millennium with the release of a compilation album Likwit Rhymes, which featured mostly previously unreleased material from his earlier recordings and a guest spot on "Bitch Please II", along with Eminem, Snoop Dogg, Dr. Dre and Nate Dogg. Xzibit also received a guest spot on Limp Bizkit's 8× platinum album Chocolate Starfish and the Hot Dog Flavored Water on the song "Getcha Groove On". His breakthrough came with his third studio album Restless, with Dr. Dre as executive producer and guest appearances by Snoop Dogg, Nate Dogg, Eminem, Dr. Dre, DJ Quik, and the Alkaholiks, among others, which sold almost 2 million copies and was certified platinum. It spawned three singles, the most successful being "X", which peaked at number 76 in the U.S., 14 in the UK and 4 in Germany. The album reached number 12 in the US. Dr. Dre invited Xzibit to perform on his American Up in Smoke Tour in mid-2000, which featured Snoop Dogg, Eminem, and Ice Cube, among many others. The same year, he also starred in the direct-to-video crime film Tha Eastsidaz by the group of the same name and was a playable character in the video game Madden NFL 2001. He continued to star in films involving fellow rap artists such as The Wash, co-starring Dr. Dre and Snoop Dogg, in 2001 and The Slim Shady Show and 8 Mile, co-starring Eminem, in 2001 and 2002, respectively. He released two concert films in 2001, Xzibit: Restless Xposed, centered around the recording of his third studio album and various live-performances and was also seen in Tha Alkaholiks: X.O. The Movie Experience by the rap group of the same name. He also released a compilation album of songs that featured him, entitled You Better Believe It. Xzibit contributed vocals to Fat Joe's 2001 album, Jealous Ones Still Envy, appearing on the song "The Wild Life".

In 2002, he guest-starred in the comedy series Cedric the Entertainer Presents as Mack Daddy in the eponymous episode and released his fourth studio album Man vs. Machine with mostly similar guest appearances like its predecessor, which spawned three singles, which all failed to chart in the Hot 100, although "Multiply" reached number 39 in the UK and 33 in Germany. The album itself was certified Gold by the RIAA, although Xzibit was unhappy with the crafting and promotion of his newest product, ending the cooperation with Dr. Dre. The album is his highest-charting album to date, reaching number 3 in the U.S. and 8 in Canada. Following the rekase of the album, in 2003, Xzibit's contract with Loud was absorbed by Columbia and he was signed directly to them. He also starred in The Country Bears. He continued to collaborate with his West Coast colleagues, Ras Kass and Saafir, forming The Golden State Project (originally Golden State Warriors) rap collective, and Tha Alkaholiks, along with Snoop Dogg and Eminem, whom he accompanied on his All Access Europe tour in 2003.

=== 2003–2006: Pimp My Ride and transition into acting ===
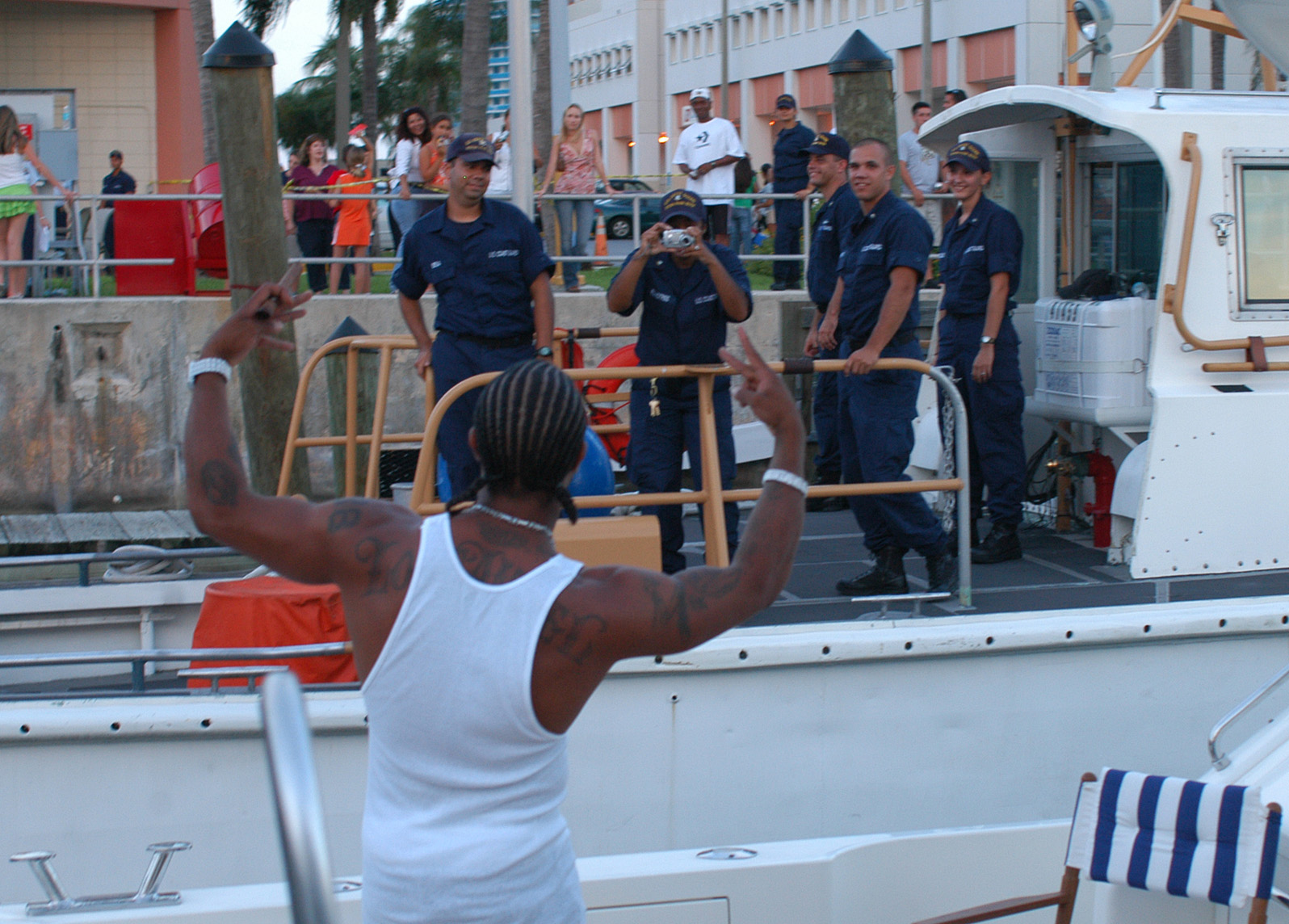
Xzibit at the 2004 MTV Video Music Awards in Miami

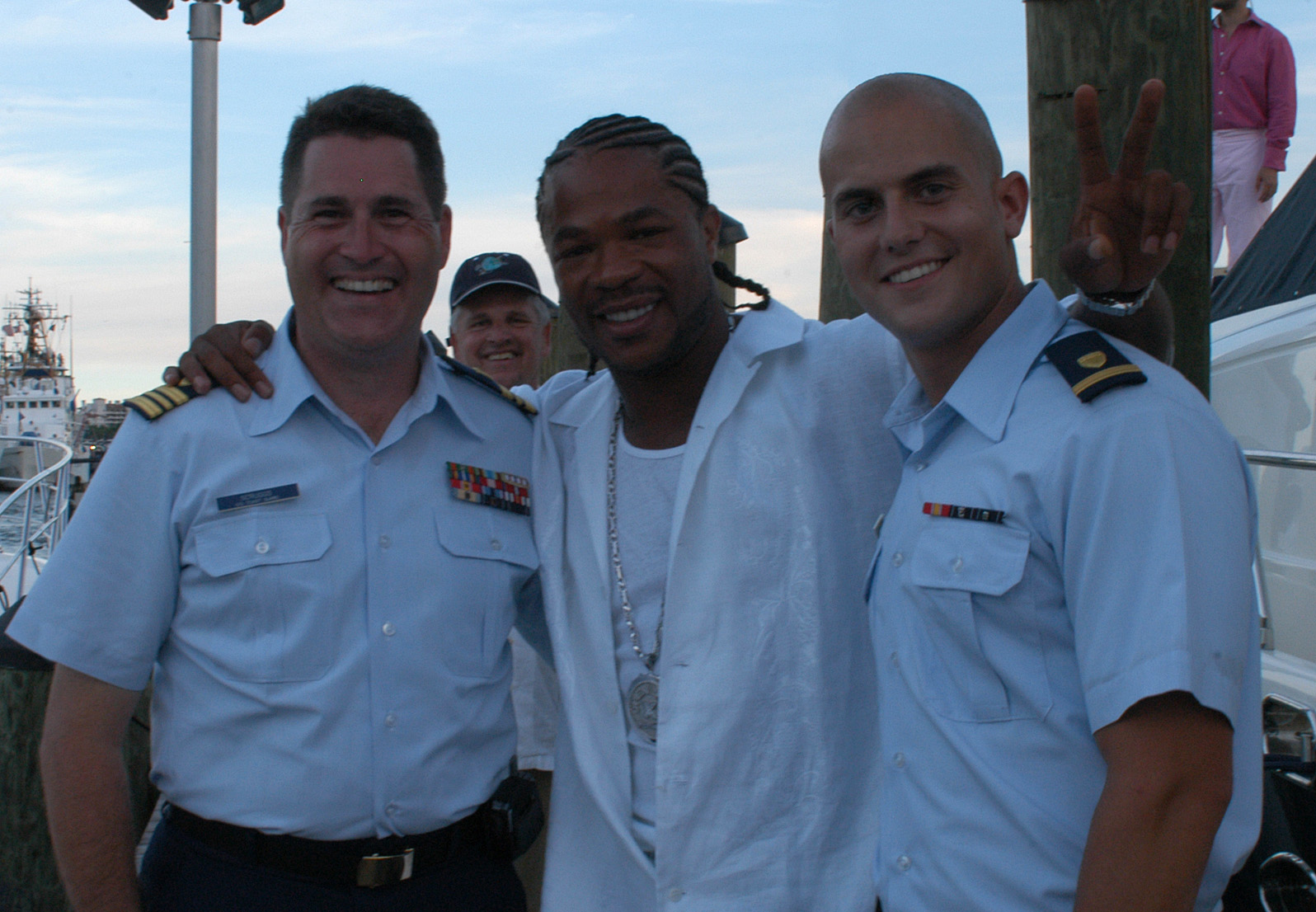
Xzibit with members of the United States Coast Guard, 2004

Xzibit received a boost in popularity between 2004 and 2007 when he was introduced to a major audience as the host of the MTV show Pimp My Ride, in which he brings an individual's wrecked car to West Coast Customs, where it undergoes a rejuvenation.

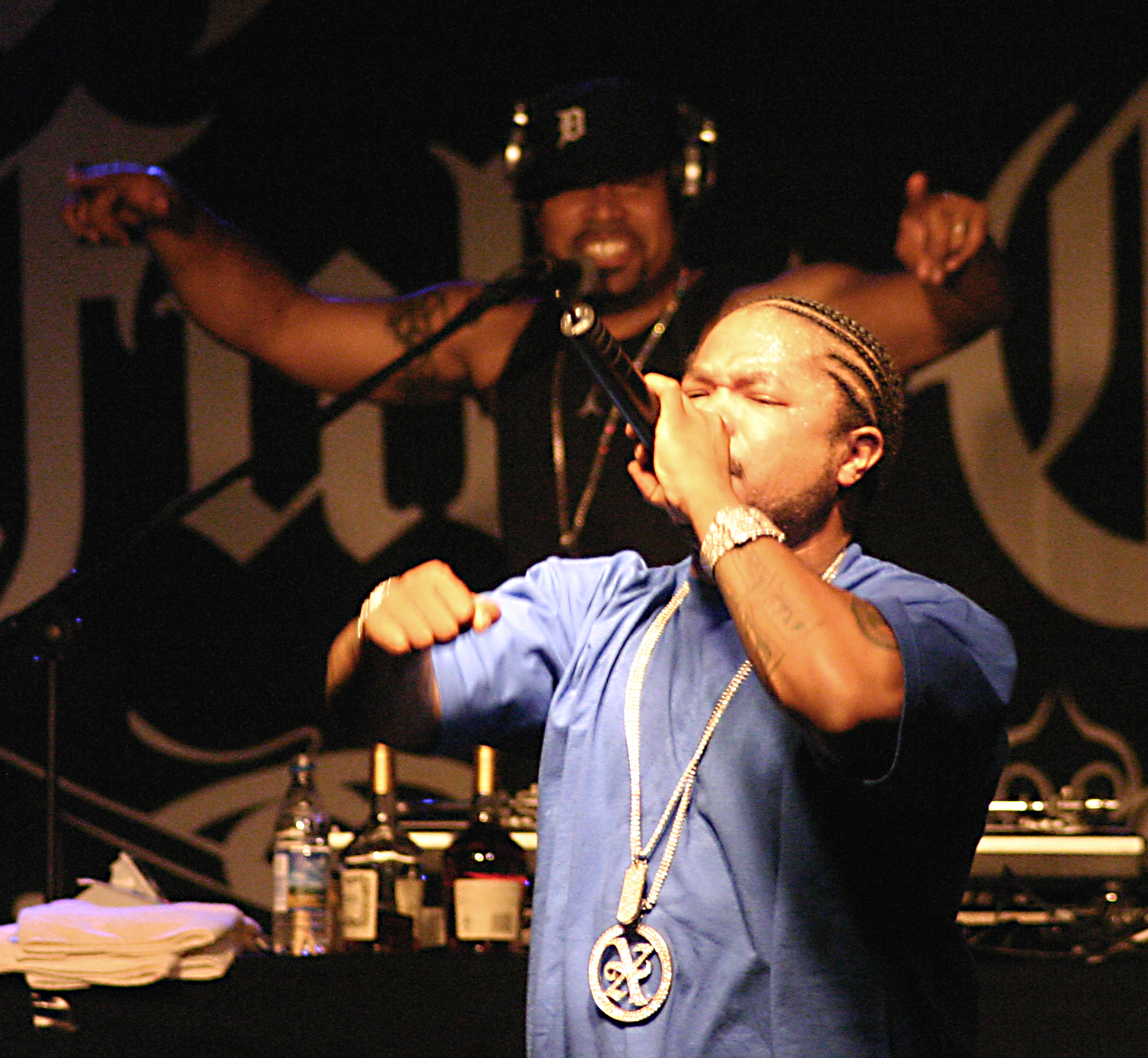
Xzibit live in Berlin, 2007

Musically, he started the year off with the release of his second compilation album Appetite for Destruction featuring 50 Cent on one track, consisting mostly of tracks from his Dre period and songs that didn't make the cut for his fifth studio album Weapons of Mass Destruction, which was released in December 2004, entering the charts at 43 in the U.S. For this album, he reunited with Columbia Records, after having parted ways with producer and mentor Dr. Dre. The album notably did not feature any contributions from Dr. Dre or Snoop Dogg. Additionally, before the album's release, he switched management from Paul Roseberg and Goliath to John Boyle. The album managed to go gold, but yet again Xzibit was unhappy with the promotion and backing of his label, claiming that they were trying to promote him like Jessica Simpson, leaving the label in anger and going independent. His single "Hey Now (Mean Muggin)" featuring Keri Hilson marked his last chart success on the Billboard Hot 100, peaking at number 93, while the second single "Muthafucka" failed to chart. Aside from his music and Pimp My Ride, he starred in the movie Full Clip, alongside Busta Rhymes, guest-starred in CSI: Miami in the episode The Rap Sheet, released a concert documentary with his new group, eponymously titled Strong Arm Steady and hosted the 2004 MTV Europe Music Awards in Rome. In 2005, he collaborated with shock rock legend Alice Cooper on a track entitled "Stand" from the album Dirty Diamonds. This represented Cooper's first-ever foray into rap music. This year marks his most busy one, also being featured in three video games, The Chronicles of Riddick: Escape from Butcher Bay, where he lent his voice and likeness to the warden Abbott and Def Jam: Fight for NY and NFL Street 2, where he was a playable character.

The following year, he mainly focused on acting, getting roles in the Hollywood blockbusters Derailed opposite Clive Owen and Jennifer Aniston in which he played as Dexter, XXX: State of the Union as Zeke that also starred fellow L.A. rapper Ice Cube and Hoodwinked, where he voiced Chief Ted Grizzly opposite Anne Hathaway, Glenn Close, and Patrick Warburton. In 2006, he starred in the drama Gridiron Gang as Malcolm Moore and made two guest-appearances in the animated sitcom The Boondocks. The year also saw the release of his sixth studio album Full Circle released independently on Koch Records. The album charted at position 50 but was a commercial flop, selling merely 120,000 copies in the U.S.. None of the three singles were able to chart, although "Concentrate" climbed at number 68 in Germany. The album featured Kurupt, T-Pain and The Game, whom he assisted on his album Doctor's Advocate, where he rapped on the track "California Vacation". He also worked on two video games that year, Def Jam Fight for NY: The Takeover and Pimp My Ride. The year 2007 saw him hosting the final season of Pimp My Ride only, although he competed in the Gumball 3000 2007 rally.

=== 2006–2012: Full Circle and hiatus ===
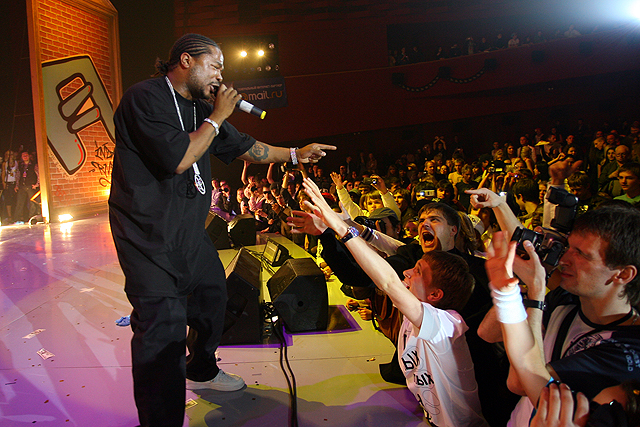
Xzibit in 2007

After the cancelation of Pimp My Ride in 2007, 2008 was the first year where Xzibit did not release an album in his former two-year cycle. Though starring in two movies The X-Files: I Want to Believe as Mosley Drummy and American Violet as Darrell Hughes, this year marked a significant financial downstep for him, earning merely $70,000, opposed by almost $500,000 one year prior. He was also featured on The Alkaholiks Tha Alkaholiks: Live from Rehab concert film that year. In 2009, he played the mob leader Big Fate in the acclaimed The Bad Lieutenant: Port of Call New Orleans and reprised his role as Abbott in the enhanced remake of 2004's The Chronicles of Riddick: Escape from Butcher Bay, The Chronicles of Riddick: Assault on Dark Athena, while Sony released his first greatest hits album, entitled The Greatest Hits. Even though his financial troubles were increased even further, as he had to file for bankruptcy in July 2009 and January 2010, although both attempts were dismissed and his houses and belongings liened.

In 2010, he had a guest-spot in the crime series Detroit 1-8-7, in the episode Royal Bubbles / Needle Drop. He also had the role of the Jabberwock in Malice n Wonderland, a short film based on the novel Alice in Wonderland, included on the re-release of the eponymous Snoop Dogg album, entitled More Malice. After having guest-starred three times in the previous season, he was added to the permanent cast of Extreme Makeover: Home Edition, where he is a part of the design team. After a four-year hiatus, he planned to release his seventh studio album MMX in 2010, but due to label issues the album was not released by the end of year. In March 2011, he teamed up with Extreme Music, to release a new compilation of material titled Urban Ammo 2. Xzibit produced, composed and performed all 40 tracks on the compilation album, created primarily for professional music users and music supervisors in need of material for their movie/television productions. Xzibit enlisted veteran director Matt Alonzo to shoot the videos for the two singles, which are titled "Man on the Moon" and "What It Is", both featuring Young De. In April 2011 he teamed up with Fredwreck and Adil Omar for a song on The Mushroom Cloud Effect. He also appeared in the TV movie Weekends at Bellevue as a nurse in late 2011, an unsuccessful pilot that was not picked up in the end.

=== 2012–present: Napalm, Empire, and Kingmaker ===
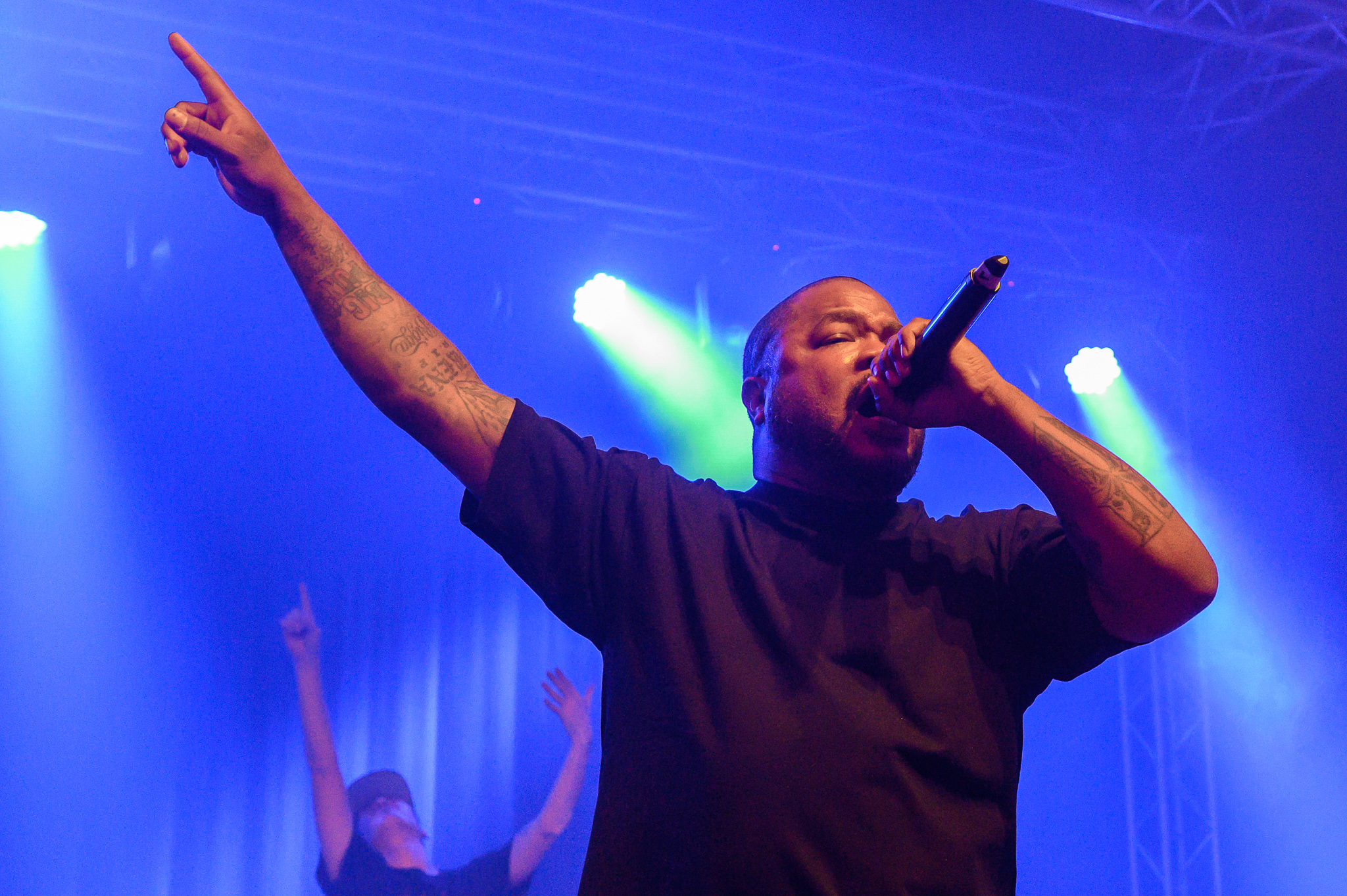
Xzibit live in 2019

On October 19, 2011, it was announced that the title of the album had been changed to Napalm. On October 9, 2012, Napalm was released and Xzibit made an appearance on the BET Cypher in the 2012 BET Hip Hop Awards. On October 29, 2012, Xzibit announced the Collateral Damage tour with the first 16 shows in Canada starting in early November. The tour eventually grew to 18 shows and Xzibit announced this was the first leg on a global tour that would continue into 2013. He starred in the TV movie Seal Team Six: The Raid on Osama Bin Laden as a Navy SEAL, depicting the death of Osama bin Laden. He also appeared in three episodes of Hawaii Five-0 as Jason "JC" Dekker starting in 2013. On November 8, 2013, Dutch symphonic metal band Within Temptation revealed the title, artwork and track listing of their upcoming sixth studio album, Hydra. Xzibit features as a guest vocalist on the third track entitled "And We Run". In October 2013 Xzibit released an album with the hip-hop group Serial Killers alongside Demrick and B-Real. Xzibit recently appeared on Dr. Dre's studio album Compton, on the song "Loose Cannons" alongside Cold 187um and Sly Pyper.

During his UK tour, Xzibit spoke with Hip-Hop Kings regarding his upcoming work. He confirmed a brand new album to be released in 2016 with Dr. Dre as a featured producer. Furthermore, Xzibit told the crowd in Manchester that he would be returning next year for the Compton Tour. Xzibit confirmed that Dr. Dre and Kendrick Lamar were confirmed artists who would be on the Compton Tour.

On February 25, 2016, it was announced that he would be joining the cast of Empire, playing the character of Shyne.

In September 2024, Conor McGregor announced in an Instagram post that Xzibit had joined his new record company Greenback Records. Xzibit performed his first live show under the new record label on Saturday, October 12 in Marbella, Spain at Bare Knuckle Fighting Championship.

== Personal life ==
Xzibit and his ex-wife Krista had two children together, Xavier (who was born prematurely on May 15, 2008, and died eleven days later) and Gatlyn, before she filed for divorce in February 2021. The song "The Foundation" from At the Speed of Life is dedicated to his son from a previous relationship, Tremayne (born June 8, 1995), who is also a rapper under the name Tre Capital.

According to public records, as of late 2010 Xzibit owed more than $900,000 in delinquent federal taxes. He tried to file for bankruptcy twice, in July 2009 and January 2010, but his bankruptcy filings were dismissed. The problems started after Pimp My Ride was canceled: in 2007 he earned $497,175; after the cancelation his 2008 income was reported as $67,510.

His cat, Thunder Cat, has its own Instagram account.

=== Gumball 3000 ===
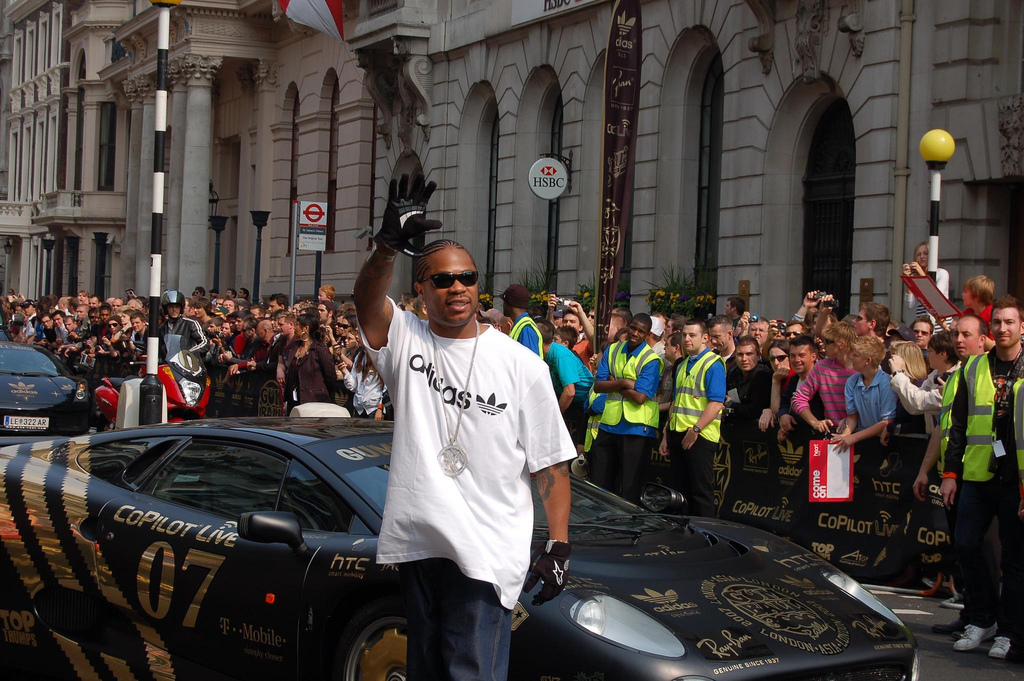
Xzibit at the Gumball 3000 rally in London, 2007

At the Gumball 3000 rally in 2007, Xzibit drove a black Jaguar XJ220. During the first day of the rally, Dutch police seized his driver's license for doing 160 km/h in a 100 km/h zone. After the penalty, his co-driver, producer Fredwreck Nassar took over the wheel and they were allowed to continue. In an interview with Dutch radio personality Reinout "Q-Bah" van Gendt, Xzibit said that he mistook the kilometers for miles (100 mph = 160 km/h). Ultimately, he never got his license back from the Dutch police and had to apply for a new one in the United States. Xzibit competed again in both the 2013 and 2014 Gumball 3000.

== Discography ==
Studio albums

- At the Speed of Life (1996)
- 40 Dayz & 40 Nightz (1998)
- Restless (2000)
- Man vs. Machine (2002)
- Weapons of Mass Destruction (2004)
- Full Circle (2006)
- Napalm (2012)
- Kingmaker (2025)

Collaborative albums

- Summer of Sam (2020) (with B-Real and Demrick as Serial Killers)

== Filmography ==
=== Film ===
Year	Title	Role	Notes
1999	The Breaks	Jamal	
2000	Tha Eastsidaz	"Blue"	Video
2001	The Slim Shady Show	Knuckles (voice)	Video
2001	The Wash	Wayne	
2002	8 Mile	Mike, Male Lunch Truck Rapper	
2002	The Country Bears	Himself	
2004	Full Clip	Duncan	
2005	XXX: State of the Union	Zeke	
2005	Derailed	Dexter	
2005	Hoodwinked!	Chief Grizzly (voice)	
2006	Gridiron Gang	Malcolm Moore	
2008	The X-Files: I Want to Believe	FBI Special Agent Mosley Drummy	
2008	American Violet	Darrell Hughes	
2009	The Bad Lieutenant: Port of Call New Orleans	Donald "Big Fate" Godshaw	
2010	Malice n Wonderland	Jabberwock	Video
2012	Seal Team Six: The Raid on Osama Bin Laden	"Mule"	TV movie
2017	Sun Dogs	Master Sergeant Jenkins	

=== Television ===
Year	Title	Role	Notes
2001	The Test	Himself / Panelist	Episode: "The Morality Test (I)"
2001	MTV Cribs	Himself	Episode: "Xzibit, Boy George, Penny Hardaway, Al Harris"
2002	Weakest Link	Himself	Episode: "Rap Stars"
2002	Mad TV	Himself	Episode: "Episode 8.4"
2003	Cedric the Entertainer Presents	"Mack Daddy"	Episode: "Episode 1.14"
2004	TV Land's Top Ten	Himself	Episode: "Top 10 TV Cars"
2004	All of Us	Himself	Episode: "Basket Cases"
2004	CSI: Miami	Dwayne "10-Large" Jackman	Episode: "Rap Sheet"
2004	MTV Europe Music Awards	Himself / Host	Main Host
2004–2007	Pimp My Ride	Himself / Host	Main Host
2006	Mad TV	Himself	Episode: "Episode 12.1"
2006–2007	The Boondocks	Himself (voice)	Guest Cast: Season 1–2
2009–2012	Extreme Makeover: Home Edition	Himself	Recurring Designer: Season 7-9
2010	Detroit 1-8-7	Russel Pits	Episode: "Royal Bubbles/Needle Drop"
2012	Loiter Squad	Himself	Episode: "Date"
2013–2015	Hawaii Five-0	Jason "J.C." Dekker	Guest Cast: Season 4–5
2015	Unsung	Himself	Episode: "Nate Dogg"
2016–2019	Empire	Leslie "Shyne" Johnson	Guest: Season 2 & 5, Main Cast: Season 3–4
2017	Hollywood Game Night	Himself / Celebrity Player	Episode: "Hollywood Game Night"
2018	Gettin' Wild with Snoop Dogg	Himself	Episode: "Episode 2.2" & "2.4"
2018	American Dad!	Juicy Lou (voice)	Episode: The Never-Ending Stories"
2019	Hip-Hop Evolution	Himself	Recurring Guest: Season 3
2019	Broken Ground	Himself	Main Cast
2020	Ridiculousness	Himself	Episode: "Xzibit"
2021	Hip Hop Uncovered	Himself	Recurring Guest
2022	30 for 30	Himself	Episode: "The Greatest Mixtape Ever"
2024	Saturday Night Live	Himself (cameo)	Episode: "Jacob Elordi/Reneé Rapp"; prerecorded cameo, cut for time

=== Music videos ===
Year	Artist	Song	Role
1999	Dr. Dre featuring Snoop Dogg	"Still D.R.E."	Himself
2000	Dr. Dre featuring Snoop Dogg	"The Next Episode"	Himself
2000	Big Pun featuring Donell Jones	"It's So Hard"	Himself
2001	P. Diddy featuring Black Rob & Mark Curry	"Bad Boy for Life"	Himself
2003	50 Cent	"In da Club"	Himself
2004	Cypress Hill featuring Tim Armstrong	"What's Your Number?"	Himself
2005	Korn	"Twisted Transistor"	Fieldy
2008	The Game featuring Lil Wayne	"My Life"	Himself
2009	Busta Rhymes featuring Jadakiss & Lil Wayne	"Respect My Conglomerate"	Himself

=== Documentary ===
Year	Title	Role
1997	Rhyme & Reason	Himself
2012	Something from Nothing: The Art of Rap	Himself

=== Video games ===
Year	Title	Role	Notes
2000	Madden NFL 2001	Himself	Playable character
2002	Street Hoops	Himself	Voice role
2004	The Chronicles of Riddick: Escape from Butcher Bay	Abbott	Voice and likeness
2004	Def Jam: Fight for NY	Himself	Playable character; voice and likeness
2004	NFL Street 2	Himself	Playable Character; voice and likeness Released as NFL Street 2 Unleashed for PSP
2006	Pimp My Ride	Himself	Guide / The Narrator
2006	Def Jam Fight for NY: The Takeover	Himself	Playable character; voice and likeness
2009	The Chronicles of Riddick: Assault on Dark Athena	Abbott	Voice and likeness
2024	Chrome Valley Customs	Himself	Voice and likeness
