= Likwit Crew =

American hip hop collective

- Origin: Los Angeles, California, US
- Genres: Hip hop
- Years active: 1992–present
- Spinoffs: Likwit Junkies (Defari & DJ Babu); Liknuts (Tha Alkaholiks & The Beatnuts)
- Members: King T Tha Alkaholiks (E-Swift, J-Ro & Tash); Lootpack (DJ Romes, Madlib & Wildchild); Xzibit; Declaime; Phil Da Agony; Defari; Styliztik Jones; J. Wells
- Website: likwit.net

The Likwit Crew is an American hip hop collective from California, founded by Compton-based rapper King Tee. Considered to have been originated in 1992 when King Tee introduced Tha Alkaholiks trio, composed of members E-Swift, J-Ro and Tash, on the lead single "Got It Bad Y'all" from his third studio album Tha Triflin' Album.

In 1993, the Lootpack trio, consisting of Wildchild, Madlib and DJ Romes, debuted on Tha Alkaholiks' first studio album, 21 & Over, which also featured a guest appearance from King Tee on two songs. 1995 saw the releases of Tha Alkaholiks' sophomore studio album Coast II Coast and King Tee's fourth album IV Life, both featured Xzibit, marking the latter's inclusion to the collective.

From the mid to late 90s, the collective began to expand, replenished with rappers Phil Da Agony of the Barbershop MC's and Defari Herut, as well as close affiliates by the likes of Declaime and Montage One in conjunction with the release of projects of its established members—Xzibit's first two albums At the Speed of Life (1996) and 40 Dayz & 40 Nightz (1998), Tha Alkaholiks' third studio album Likwidation (1997), the Lootpack's debut Soundpieces: Da Antidote (1999) and Tash's solo album Rap Life (1999).

King Tee, who was expected to release his fifth studio album The Kingdom Come while signed to Aftermath Entertainment at that time, along with fellow Likwit Crew members Xzibit and Defari, was featured on Dr. Dre's critically acclaimed second studio album 2001. By the end of the following year, Xzibit's third studio album Restless, which featured contributions from Likwit Crew members Defari, J-Ro, King Tee, Tash, affiliate record producer Thayod Ausar, as well as high profile artists such as Snoop Dogg and Eminem, was highly praised by music critics and received a Platinum certification by the Recording Industry Association of America. A follow-up to Restless, Xzibit's 2002 Man vs. Machine, made it to No. 3 on the Billboard 200 albums chart in the US and received a Gold certification by the RIAA. The album didn't feature any of the Likwit Crew members, however it presented short-lived supergroup and Open Bar Entertainment signee the Golden State Project, composed of Xzibit, Ras Kass and Saafir.

During the early to mid 2000s, several collective members released mediocre projects—Tha Alkaholiks' fourth studio album X.O. Experience (2001), which was released under Tha Liks moniker, and Wildchild's 2003 debut Secondary Protocol—while making connections with such acts as Planet Asia and Dilated Peoples, participating in the latter's first four studio albums. Phil Da Agony, Mitchy Slick and Krondon formed Strong Arm Steady, who appeared on Xzibit's fifth studio album Weapons of Mass Destruction (2004). Defari and Beat Junkies/Dilated Peoples' member DJ Babu formed a duo the Likwit Junkies and released their debut studio album The L.J.'s in 2005 via ABB Records. In 2001 to 2002, Styliztik Jones and J. Wells officially joined the collective.

2006 marked the release of Tha Alkaholiks' fifth and final studio album Firewater, Defari's third solo effort Street Music and Xzibit's sixth studio album Full Circle. In 2009, Xzibit was featured on B-Real's debut solo studio album Smoke n Mirrors alongside newcomer Young De, eventually forming Serial Killers. In 2011, Tha Alkaholiks and New York–based hip hop duo The Beatnuts announced the formation of Liknuts. In 2012, Xzibit has released Napalm, his seventh studio album after six years gap between the albums, which included a Likwit Crew posse cut "Louis XIII" featuring core members King Tee and Tha Alkaholiks.

== Members ==
- Roger "King T" McBride – rapper, producer
- James "J-Ro" Robinson – rapper, member of Tha Alkaholiks & Liknuts
- Eric "E-Swift" Brooks – producer, rapper, member of Tha Alkaholiks & Liknuts
- Rico "Tash" Smith – rapper, member of Tha Alkaholiks & Liknuts
- Jack "Wildchild" Brown – rapper, member of Lootpack
- Otis "Madlib" Jackson Jr. – producer, rapper, member of Lootpack
- Romeo "DJ Romes" Jimenez – scratches, member of Lootpack
- Alvin "Xzibit" Joiner – rapper, member of Golden State Project & Serial Killers
- Dudley "Declaime" Perkins – rapper
- Duane "Defari" Johnson – rapper, member of Likwit Junkies
- Jason "Phil Da Agony" Smith – rapper
- Douglas "Styliztik Jones" Jones – rapper
- Jon "J. Wells" Henderson – producer, rapper

== See also ==
- List of Los Angeles rappers
