= Front 2 Back =

Single by Xzibit

from the album Restless
- Released: May 22, 2001
- Recorded: 2000
- Studio: Record One; Encore Studios
- Genre: West Coast hip hop; gangsta rap
- Length: 3:02
- Label: Loud
- Songwriters: Alvin Joiner; Dana Stinson
- Producer: Rockwilder

Xzibit singles chronology
"X" (2000)	"Front 2 Back" (2001)	"Get Your Walk On" (2001)

Music video
- "Front 2 Back" on YouTube

"Front 2 Back" is a West Coast hip hop song written and performed by American rapper Xzibit. It was released on May 22, 2001 through Loud Records as the second single from his third studio album Restless. Recording sessions took place at Record One and Encore Studios. Production was handled by Rockwilder.

An accompanying music video for the song directed by Diane Martel, features cameo appearances from Kurupt, Karrine Steffans, Tha Alkaholiks, Ras Kass, Alex Thomas, Mr. Marcus and Rockwilder.

== Track listing ==
No.	Title	Writer(s)	Producer(s)	Length
1.	"Front 2 Back" (Explicit)	Alvin Joiner; Dana Stinson	Rockwilder
2.	"Alkaholik (Explicit)" (featuring Erick Sermon, J-Ro and Tash)	Joiner; Erick Sermon; James Robinson; Rico Smith	Erick Sermon
3.	"X" (Howie Beno Mix-Main)	Joiner; Andre Young; Melvin Bradford	Thayod Ausar; Sir Jinx
4.	"Front 2 Back" (Instrumental)	Joiner; Stinson	Rockwilder

== Charts ==
Chart (2001)	Peak position
Germany (GfK)	95
Switzerland (Schweizer Hitparade)	66
US Hot R&B/Hip-Hop Songs (Billboard)	65
US Hot Rap Songs (Billboard)	42

== Release history ==
Region	Date	Format(s)	Label(s)	Ref.
United States	April 10, 2001	Rhythmic contemporary radio	Loud, Columbia	
