= Love, Life & Loyalty =

Studio album by GLC
- Released: October 12, 2010
- Recorded: 2009–2010; CRC Studios (Chicago, IL); Get It Man Studios (Atlanta, GA); GMG Studios (Chicago, IL); Hinge Studios (Chicago, IL); Manfred Studios (London, UK); Nasa Studios (New York, NY); SoundScape Studios (Chicago, IL); The Record Plant (Los Angeles, CA)
- Genre: Hip hop
- Length: 60:38 (normal version); 68:12 (bonus track version)
- Label: Ylimit; Ice H_{2}O; EMI
- Producer: Leray "Arlo" Jackson (Trailblazer MPC); Sean Breeze; Dae Dae; Ferrari Mike (also exec.); Leonard Harris (also exec.); GLC; Keezo Kane; Legendary Traxster; Victor Alexander; T-Pain; Christian Rich; John Legend; Arron Starr; Albert Sye; Kanye West; Xcel

Singles from Love, Life & Loyalty
- 1. "Flight School" Released: 2010; 2. "My First Model" Released: 2010; 3. "Clockin' Lotsa Dollarz" Released: 2010

Love, Life & Loyalty is the first and only album by American hip hop musician GLC, released on October 12, 2010, on Ylimit Records. The album was mostly produced by Kanye West, but he received other production collaborations, like the producer and singer T-Pain, among The Legendary Traxster and the rest of Kanye's GOOD Music producers.

== Background ==
The album features production by Arlo Jackson, Sean Breeze, Dae Dae, Ferrari Mike, Leonard Harris, GLC himself, Keezo Kane, The Legendary Traxster, T-Pain, Christian Rich, Arron Starr, Albert Sye, Kanye West, Xcel, this influenced in the album style and lyricism, who assumed alternative hip hop characteristics, added at the midwest rap style, who created a new fusion in GLC's career. In the lyricism predominated the old southern lyrical styles, over the GLC compositions and Kanye's production, and the lyricism was compared to Kanye's debut and second albums. The album was announced by GLC at the beginning of the year, and was promoted with the single "Flight School". GLC also promoted his work in Kid Cudi's second album, in the track "The End", along Nicole Wray, Cudi and Chip tha Ripper. GLC helped Kanye's fifth album in the background vocals. GOOD Music officially announced the album in September.

== Charts and critical response ==
The album reached No. 90 on the Billboard Top R&B/Hip-Hop Albums chart. Critic response was mostly positive in the alternative hip hop and UK scene. The best received tracks were "Flight School" and "Clockin' Lotsa Dollarz".

== Singles ==
The album's single "Flight School", featured production and vocals from his mentor, Kanye West, as well as T-Pain. The song does not have an official music video, but was well received by most Magazines and Critics alike. The first official single of the album is "Clockin' Lotsa Dollarz", featuring the south star, member of UGK, Bun B, along with the rapper Sir Mix-A-Lot, featuring production from Kanye West and The Legendary Traxster. The single had an official music video, and was performed live at the A3C festival, in Perfect Attendance Stage, in a surprise performance; also at the B. B. King, in NYC. The single, on iTunes, comes with a clean and an explicit version.

== Track listing ==
Love, Life & Loyalty track listing
No.	Title	Writer(s)	Producer(s)	Length
1.	"The Big Knot" (featuring Bump J)	Bearden; Boykin; Harris	Kanye West; GLC; Albert Sye	4:46
2.	"Clockin' Lotsa Dollarz" (featuring Bun B and Sir Mix-A-Lot)	Bryant Bell; Freeman; Harris; Ray	Kanye West; The Legendary Traxster	3:58
3.	"Pour Another Drink" (featuring John Legend)	Harris; A. Jackson	Leray "Arlo" Jackson; Leonard Harris; GLC; West; John Legend	4:28
4.	"Cold As Ice" (featuring Twista)	Bell; Harris; Mitchell	West; Albert Sye	4:17
5.	"MHCC" (featuring Byrd Dre)	Bolden; Frazier; Harris	GLC; The Legendary Traxster	4:30
6.	"Flight School" (featuring Kanye West and T-Pain)	Butts; Harris; Najm; West	West; T-Pain; GLC	4:43
7.	"So Real" (featuring BJ the Chicago Kid)	Harris; Sledge	Keezo Kane; West	4:30
8.	"My 1st Model" (featuring Christian Rich)	Harris; Hassan; Hassan	West; Ferrari Mike; Christian Rich	4:35
9.	"The Light" (featuring Manfred Mann)	Damien Davis; Harris; Springsteen	Dae Dae; Xcel	4:24
10.	"I Ain't Even On Yet"	Bell; Harris	West; Sean Breeze	3:05
11.	"Pull Me Back" (featuring The Legendary Traxster)	Harris; Lindley	The Legendary Traxster	4:01
12.	"Rosanne"	Harris; Kerr	West; GLC	3:22
13.	"This What It Is"	Davis; Harris	GLC; The Legendary Traxster	3:53
14.	"I Did It"	Harris	Keezo Kane; West; GLC	4:41
15.	"Tator Chip Pays"	Harris	Arron Starr	1:31

iTunes Bonus Tracks
No.	Title	Writer(s)	Producer(s)	Length
16.	"Super Lame" (featuring Willie Stylez)	Harris; Stylenzski	GLC	4:05
17.	"The Light" (Remix) (featuring Manfred Mann)	Davis; Harris; Springsteen	GLC; The Legendary Traxster	3:29

== Personnel ==
Confirmed by AllMusic.

- Victor Alexander – Composer
- Kori Anders – Engineer
- Craig Bauer – Engineer, Mixing
- Eric Bearden – Composer
- Jeremy Bolden – Composer
- Terrence Boykin - Composer
- Sean Breeze – Producer
- Bryant Bell – Composer
- Arron Butts – Composer
- Mel Carter – Executive Producer
- Tator Chip – Vocals
- Eugene Cohill – A&R, Engineer
- Dae Dae – Producer
- Damien Davis – Composer
- Janelle Dudley – Vocals
- Ferrari Mike – Executive Producer
- Andre Frazier – Composer
- Bernard Freeman – Composer
- GLC – Arranger, Design, Photography, Producer
- Leonard Harris – Design, Engineer, Executive Producer, Photography
- Leonard Lavelle Harris – Composer
- Kende Hassan – Composer
- Taiwo Hassan – Composer, Engineer
- Matt Hennessy – Engineer, Mixing
- Leray "Arlo" Jackson – Composer
- Keezo Kane – Producer
- Shaun Kerr – Composer
- Anthony Kilhoffer – Engineer
- Michael Kolar – Engineer, Mastering, Mixing
- Jeff Lane – Engineer
- Laurie Latham – Engineer
- The Legendary Traxster – Mixing, Producer
- Samuel Lindley – Composer
- Man Man – Keyboards
- Carl Mitchell – Composer
- Faheem Rasheed Najm – Composer, Producer
- Anthony Ray – Composer, Engineer
- Christian Rich – Producer
- Brian Sledge – Composer
- Bruce Springsteen – Composer
- Jon Spurgeon – Engineer
- Arron Starr – Producer
- Albert Sye – Executive Producer
- Kanye West – Composer, Producer
- Xcel – Producer
- Zzaje – Horn
