= Control Freek =

Studio album by Tash
- Released: June 30, 2009
- Genre: Hip hop
- Label: Amalgam Digital
- Producer: Affion; Da Truth; Emmaculate; E Sharp; E-Swift; J Beam; Josh G; J. Wells; Maestro; Montage One; Oh No; Thayod Ausar; Tony Touch

Tash chronology
Firewater (2006)	Control Freek (2009)	Blood, Sweat & Beers (2013)

Professional ratings
Review scores
Source	Rating
DubCNN.com	3.5/5
HipHopDX	3/5
RapReviews	7/10

Control Freek is the second solo studio album by American rapper Tash. It was released on June 30, 2009 via Amalgam Digital. Production was handled by E-Swift, J Beam, Affion Crockett, Da Truth, Emmaculate, E Sharp, Josh G, J. Wells, Maestro, Montage One, Oh No, Thayod Ausar and Tony Touch. It features guest appearances from Tha Alkaholiks, Knoc-turn'al, Fameus, King T, Ali Jammali, B-Real, Del the Funky Homosapien, Khujo, Kokane, Mathmadix, Montageone, O Sin, Samuel Christian and Styliztik Jones.

== Track listing ==
No.	Title	Writer(s)	Producer(s)	Length
1.	"The Book Ch. 1"	Ricardo D. Smith; Eddie Myricks	E Sharp	1:42
2.	"Go West" (featuring E-Swift)	R. Smith; Eric Brooks; J. Guiry	Josh G	3:34
3.	"Get It" (featuring Del the Funky Homosapien)	R. Smith; Teren Delvon Jones; Jared John Beam	J Beam	3:20
4.	"How Hi Can U Get" (featuring B-Real)	R. Smith; Louis Freese; Brooks	E-Swift	3:40
5.	"Wet Paint" (featuring Kokane)	R. Smith; Jerry Buddy Long, Jr.; Brooks	E-Swift	3:50
6.	"Pull It Outcha Pocket"	R. Smith; Beam	J Beam	2:58
7.	"Started with a Bang" (featuring Fameus)	R. Smith; A. Gatling; R. Densin Jr.	Da Truth	4:12
8.	"Obama Skit" (featuring Affion Crockett)	R. Smith; Affion Scott Crockett	Affion	1:22
9.	"Push the Button" (featuring Khujo Goodie)	R. Smith; Willie Knighton Jr.; Vaushaun Brooks	Maestro	2:56
10.	"A Penny for My Thoughts" (featuring Samuel Christian)	R. Smith; Samuel Clothier Christian; Jon Wells	J. Wells	3:24
11.	"We Do This" (featuring King T, Knoc-turn'al and J Beam)	R. Smith; Roger McBride; Royal Harbor; Beam	J Beam	4:29
12.	"Right/Wrong" (featuring J-Ro and Ali Jammali)	R. Smith; James Robinson; Ali Jammali; Michael Jackson	Oh No	3:23
13.	"Bubble Up" (featuring Knoc-turn'al)	R. Smith; Harbor; Beam	J Beam	3:43
14.	"Closer" (featuring Fameus)	R. Smith; Gatling; E. Wilson	Emmaculate	3:15
15.	"Tony Touch Intro" (featuring Tony Touch)	Joseph Anthony Hernandez	Tony Touch	0:20
16.	"City's Out" (featuring Knoc-turn'al and Knawledg)	R. Smith; Harbor; Knawledg; Beam	J Beam	3:14
17.	"New Bikini"	R. Smith; Brooks	E-Swift	3:35
18.	"Don't Wanna Kill U" (featuring King T, Styliztik Jones and Osin)	R. Smith; McBride; Douglas Jones; O Sin; Eric James Banks	Thayod	3:41
19.	"Liquor Store Run" (featuring J-Ro and Montageone)	R. Smith; Robinson; Terrance Taylor	Montage One	4:31
