= Restless (Xzibit album) =

Studio album by Xzibit
- Released: December 12, 2000
- Recorded: 2000
- Studios: Larabee West Sound Studios; Record One; Encore Studios; Soundcastle Recordings; Skip Saylor Recording; Chung King Studios; Rocky Mountain Studios
- Genres: West Coast hip hop; gangsta rap; hardcore hip hop
- Length: 59:38
- Labels: Open Bar; SRC; Loud; Epic
- Producers: Dr. Dre (also exec.); Battlecat; DJ Quik; Eminem; Rick Rock; Erick Sermon; Rockwilder; Mel-Man; Nottz; Scott Storch; Sir Jinx; Soopafly; Thayoud Ausar

Xzibit chronology
40 Dayz & 40 Nightz (1998)	Restless (2000)	Man vs. Machine (2002)

Singles from Restless
- 1. "X" Released: November 28, 2000; 2. "Front 2 Back" Released: December 12, 2000; 3. "Get Your Walk On" Released: January 8, 2001

Restless is the third studio album by rapper Xzibit. It was released December 12, 2000 though Epic Records, Loud Records, SRC Records, and Xzibit's Open Bar Entertainment. It debuted at No. 14 on the Billboard 200 with approximately 205,000 copies sold in its first week released. The album then fell 17 spots to No. 31 in the second week, but then rose back up to peak at No. 12 the following week. Since being released, the album has been certified Platinum by the RIAA with an excess of a million copies sold in the United States, making it Xzibit's most successful album.

== Background ==
In an interview with N.O.R.E. on his podcast, Drink Champs, Xzibit told a story of how Dr. Dre became involved with the project as an executive producer and Loud exec Steve Rifkind's lack of involvement. He discussed the conversation between Dre and Rifkind: "So I was at odds with the label...and so then when we finished the tour, he was like 'Let's go do a record.' I was like, 'I'm only gonna do it if you take care of Dr. Dre.' And Dr. Dre was like, 'You gonna pay me this, and we're gonna fuckin' do this. And then we gon' get it done. But I don't want this money to come from Xzibit, I want it to come from you. And that's why the record is out.'" Xzibit credits this conversation as one that gave his project the green light.

== Reception ==
Professional ratings
Aggregate scores
Source	Rating
Metacritic	75/100
Review scores
Source	Rating
AllMusic	4/5 stars
Christgau's Consumer Guide	(2-star Honorable Mention)
Entertainment Weekly	B+
HipHopDX	3.5/5 stars
NME	7/10
RapReviews	9/10
Rolling Stone	4/5 stars
The Source	3.5/5 stars
Spin	6/10
Vibe	4/5 stars

Restless received generally positive reviews from music critics. AllMusic, Rolling Stone and Vibe all gave the album 4 out of 5 stars. At Metacritic, which assigns a normalized rating out of 100 to reviews from mainstream critics, the album received an average score of 75, based on 11 reviews.

== Track listing ==
Restless track listing
No.	Title	Writer(s)	Producer(s)	Length
1.	"Restless (Intro)"		Sir Jinx; Thayod Ausar	1:15
2.	"Front 2 Back"	Alvin Joiner; Dana Stinson	Rockwilder	3:02
3.	"Been a Long Time" (featuring Nate Dogg)	Joiner; Kevin Gilliam	Battlecat	3:57
4.	"U Know" (featuring Dr. Dre)	Joiner; Andre Young; Dominick Lamb	Dr. Dre; Nottz	3:26
5.	"X"	Joiner; Young; Melvin Bradford	Dr. Dre; Mel-Man; Scott Storch	4:15
6.	"Alkaholik" (featuring Erick Sermon, J-Ro and Tash)	Joiner; Erick Sermon; James Robinson; Rico Smith	Erick Sermon	3:39
7.	"Kenny Parker Show 2001" (featuring KRS-One)	Joiner; Thayod Ausar; Kris Parker	Xzibit; Thayod Ausar	4:45
8.	"D.N.A. (Drugs-n-Alkahol)" (featuring Snoop Dogg)	Joiner; Ricardo Thomas; Calvin Broadus	Rick Rock	4:37
9.	"Double Time"	Joiner; Sermon	Erick Sermon	2:50
10.	"Don't Approach Me" (featuring Eminem)	Joiner; Marshall Mathers; Camara Kambon; Mike Elizondo	Eminem	4:36
11.	"Rimz & Tirez" (featuring Defari, Goldie Loc and Kokane)	Joiner; Priest Brooks; Duane Johnson; Keiwan Spillman; Jerry Long	Soopafly	4:52
12.	"Fuckin' You Right"	Joiner; Brooks	Soopafly	3:42
13.	"Best of Things"	Joiner; Young	Dr. Dre	3:20
14.	"Get Your Walk On"	Joiner; Bradford; Gilliam	Mel-Man; Battlecat	3:39
15.	"Sorry I'm Away So Much" (featuring DJ Quik and Suga Free)	Joiner; David Blake; Dejuan Walker	DJ Quik	3:59
16.	"Loud & Clear" (featuring Butch Cassidy, Defari and King Tee)	Joiner; Gilliam; Johnson; Roger McBride; Danny Means	Battlecat	3:33

Notes

- "X" contains additional vocals from Snoop Dogg.
- "Fuckin’ You Right" contains uncredited vocals from Tray Deee.

== Charts ==
=== Weekly charts ===
Weekly chart performance for Restless
Chart (2000–2001)	Peak position
Australian Albums (ARIA)	53
Australian Dance Albums (ARIA)	9
Australian Urban Albums (ARIA)	9
Austrian Albums (Ö3 Austria)	52
Belgian Albums (Ultratop Flanders)	19
Belgian Albums (Ultratop Wallonia)	42
Dutch Albums (Album Top 100)	28
French Albums (SNEP)	26
German Albums (Offizielle Top 100)	21
Irish Albums (IRMA)	50
New Zealand Albums (RMNZ)	30
Scottish Albums (Official Charts)	26
Swiss Albums (Schweizer Hitparade)	40
UK Albums (Official Charts)	27
UK R&B Albums (Official Charts)	5
US Billboard 200	12
US Top R&B/Hip-Hop Albums (Billboard)	1

=== Year-end charts ===
2001 year-end chart performance for Restless
Chart (2001)	Position
Canadian Albums (Nielsen SoundScan)	150
Canadian R&B Albums (Nielsen SoundScan)	34
Canadian Rap Albums (Nielsen SoundScan)	17
UK Albums (OCC)	189
US Billboard 200	77
US Top R&B/Hip-Hop Albums (Billboard)	36

2002 year-end chart performance for Restless
Chart (2002)	Position
Canadian R&B Albums (Nielsen SoundScan)	157
Canadian Rap Albums (Nielsen SoundScan)	80

== Certifications ==
Certifications for Restless
Region	Certification	Certified units/sales
Canada (Music Canada)	Platinum	100,000^{^}
United Kingdom (BPI)	Gold	100,000^{^}
United States (RIAA)	Platinum	1,000,000^{^}
^{^} Shipments figures based on certification alone.
