= Hip Hop Drunkies =

Single by Tha Alkaholiks and Ol' Dirty Bastard

Single by Tha Alkaholiks featuring Ol' Dirty Bastard

from the album Likwidation
- Released: 1997
- Studio: Soundcastle (Los Angeles, CA); Marley's House Of Hits (New York, NY)
- Genre: Hip-hop
- Length: 14:27
- Label: Loud
- Songwriters: James Robinson; Rico Smith; Eric Brooks; Russell Jones; Marlon Williams
- Producers: E-Swift; Marley Marl (co.)

Tha Alkaholiks singles chronology
| "The Next Level" (1995) | "Hip Hop Drunkies" (1997) | "Likwidation" (1997) |

Ol' Dirty Bastard singles chronology
| "Woo-Hah!! Got You All in Check (The World Wide Remix)" (1996) | "Hip Hop Drunkies" (1997) | "Fix (Remix)" (1997) |

Music video
- "Hip Hop Drunkies" on YouTube

"Hip Hop Drunkies" is a song written and performed by American hip-hop group Tha Alkaholiks featuring Wu-Tang Clan member Ol' Dirty Bastard. It was released in 1997 through Loud Records as the lead single from Tha Liks' third studio album Likwidation. Recording sessions took place at Soundcastle in Los Angeles and at Marley's House Of Hits in New York. Production was handled by E-Swift with co-production from Marley Marl. The single peaked at number 66 on the Billboard Hot 100, at number 37 on the Hot R&B/Hip-Hop Songs, and at number 6 on the Hot Rap Songs, making it the group's most successful single.

In 1999, the song appeared on Wu-Tang compilation album Wu-Chronicles.

== Track listing ==
| No. | Title | Length |
|---|---|---|
| 1. | "Hip Hop Drunkies (Album Version)" | 4:54 |
| 2. | "Hip Hop Drunkies (Radio Edit)" | 4:53 |
| 3. | "Hip Hop Drunkies (Instrumental Version)" | 4:40 |
| Total length: | | 14:27 |

== Personnel ==
- James Robinson – main artist, songwriter
- Rico Smith – main artist, songwriter
- Eric Brooks – main artist, songwriter, producer, mixing
- Russell Jones – featured artist, songwriter
- Marlon Williams – co-producer, songwriter
- Jean-Marie Horvat – engineering, mixing
- Mark Chalecki – mastering
- Ola Kudu – art direction
- Ron Croudy – design

== Charts ==
| Chart (1997) | Peak position |
|---|---|
| US Billboard Hot 100 | 66 |
| US Hot R&B/Hip-Hop Songs (Billboard) | 37 |
| US Hot Rap Songs (Billboard) | 6 |
