= GLC =

GLC may refer to:

== Music ==
- GLC (rapper) (born 1975), American rapper signed to Kanye West's G.O.O.D. Music record label
- Goldie Lookin Chain, Welsh rappers

== Technology ==
- Gas-liquid chromatography
- Geographic Locator Codes
- Global Linear Collider, now merged into the International Linear Collider proposal
- Great Lakes Central Railroad
- Mazda GLC, a compact car
- Mercedes-Benz GLC, an SUV

== Television ==
- "GLC: The Carnage Continues...", an episode of the television series The Comic Strip Presents...
- God's Learning Channel, an American television station
- Guyana Learning Channel, a Guyanese television channel
- Good Luck Charlie, Disney Channel sitcom

== Other uses ==
- Gazankulu Liberation Congress, a minor South African political party
- Glasgow Central railway station, in Scotland
- Glucose
- Government-linked company
- Government Law Center, a research institute at Albany Law School, Albany, New York, United States
- Government Law College (disambiguation)
- Greater London Council, top-tier local government administrative body for Greater London from 1965 to 1986
- Great Lakes Commission
- Green Lake Crew, a rowing club based in Seattle, Washington, United States
- Gutnius Lutheran Church, in Papua New Guinea
- Government-linked companies, a term used for state-owned enterprises of Malaysia
