= Shae Fiol =

Cuban-American singer-songwriter

Shae Fiol (born Shae Geever on December 2, 1978, in Portland, Oregon) is a Cuban-American singer-songwriter who currently lives in New York City. The name Shae was given to her after the Cuban revolutionary Che Guevara. Her mother is American born and her father is of Cuban descent. Shae's sound is described as acoustic soul, with Latin and jazz influence. She has been compared to artists Nelly Furtado, Esthero, and Sade.

== Biography ==
Shae attended the University of New Mexico and graduated with a degree in Sociology while playing three years of division I soccer at UNM. Shae moved to Los Angeles, California to pursue the label interest of the former Loud Records. Her vocal collaboration with Tha Alkaholiks on "Run Wild", introduced her to notable hip-hop artist J-Ro of Tha Liks and Grammy Award-winning hip-hop producer Rockwilder. Her "2001" self-produced demo tape, recorded by Tom Robinson, her former music theory teacher from UNM, earned her the respect and interest of J-Ro (Steve Rifkin) of Loud Records and A&R Shane Mooney, and Rockwilder. Shae Fiol moved in 2003 to New York and began writing and recording her first album (demo project) with Rockwilder.

In 2006 Shae Fiol, teamed up with Karibi Fubara of the management company, Datoalamichael, DJ K. Life Walks, and sound Engineer Gianni Fontana, of Explode Studios. She resumed the production and recording of her debut album Catch a Ride (released June 3, 2009), of which she was the sole vocalist, primary producer, arranger and writer.

The original music from her song "All of the Above" was featured in a Neutrogena commercial for the product "Upgrade" endorsed by Jennifer Garner and it aired for one quarter in 2007.

Shae made an appearance on stage with Esthero at the Hiro Ballroom in 2007, where Shae sang "A Woman's Presence" (by S.Foster and S.Fiol). Following her performance she spoke with producer Stuart Matthewman of Sade, who had been at the Esthero concert when she sang. He produced the song "Lonely, Lovely" (M. Eaton/S.Foster/S.Fiol), which appears on her debut album "Catch a Ride." Other notable producers and musicians that appear on the album, are Rockwilder, Adam Deitch, and Mireya Ramos.

Shae Fiol is a founding member of Flor de Toloache, an all-women mariachi group based in New York City. Flor de Toloache was the 2017 Latin Grammy Winner for Best Ranchero Album, 'Las Caras Lindas.’ The group was featured in the album ‘Holidays Rule Vol. 2’ along with Paul McCartney, Norah Jones, The Roots, and others.

== Discography ==
=== Studio albums ===
2009

Catch a Ride (Shae Butter Music/Purpose Records/ Datoalamichael)

=== Soundtracks ===
2004

The Best Thief in the World (Vocal performance by Shae Fiol, written and produced by Prince Paul and Don Newkirk) Independent Film score, starring Mary-Louise Parker. The song appeared in the credits of the movie score.

=== Collaborations ===
2001

"Run Wild" (Featuring Shae Fiol) by The Alkaholiks (from the album X.O. Experience)

2004

Never Scared, 2004 by Chris Rock (Personnel: Background vocalist) released on Geffen Records
