= X (Xzibit song) =

Single by Xzibit

from the album Restless
- Released: November 28, 2000
- Genre: Hip hop
- Length: 4:15
- Label: Sony; Epic; SRC; Loud; Open Bar
- Songwriters: Alvin Joiner; Andre Young; Melvin Bradford
- Producers: Dr. Dre; Mel-Man; Scott Storch

Xzibit singles chronology
"Year 2000" (2000)	"X" (2000)	"Front 2 Back" (2000)

"X" is the first single from Xzibit's third studio album, Restless, released through Sony Music Entertainment, Epic Records, SRC Records, Loud Records, and Xzibit's Open Bar Entertainment. Fellow West Coast musician Snoop Dogg can be heard talking in the outro. It was produced by Dr. Dre with co-production from Scott Storch and Melvin "Mel-Man" Bradford. The song samples the line "Not these n**gas again" from Eminem's "Bitch Please II" which is featured on Eminem's album The Marshall Mathers LP.

== Music video ==
The music video directed by Dave Meyers has cameo appearances from Snoop Doggy Dogg, Dr. Dre, RZA and Method Man. In the first verse, Xzibit performs his verse in a limo with women around him. In the second verse, Xzibit is at a party, then in a bathroom when three men come in and try to attack Xzibit, only for Xzibit to teleport to the backstage area of his concert via a device. Most of the video includes Xzibit in a studio with Snoop and Dr. Dre and in the third verse he is in a concert performing while the cameo actors are sitting with the fans.

== Track listing ==
1. "X" (Radio Edit) - 4:22
2. "X" (Explicit) - 4:16
3. "X" (Instrumental) - 4:22

== Chart performance ==
The song charted at number 76 on the Billboard Hot 100 and number 32 on the Hot R&B/Hip-Hop Songs chart. In the UK, it reached No. 14 on the UK Singles Chart, Xzibit's second highest charting hit there after "Hey Now (Mean Muggin)" in 2004.

== Charts ==
=== Weekly charts ===
Chart (2001)	Peak position
Austria (Ö3 Austria Top 40)	19
Belgium (Ultratop 50 Flanders)	39
Belgium (Ultratop 50 Wallonia)	32
France (SNEP)	73
Germany (GfK)	4
Ireland (IRMA)	24
Netherlands (Dutch Top 40)	18
Netherlands (Single Top 100)	12
Scottish Singles Sales (Official Charts)	15
Sweden (Sverigetopplistan)	42
Switzerland (Schweizer Hitparade)	5
UK Singles (Official Charts)	14
UK Dance (Official Charts)	3
UK Hip Hop/R&B (Official Charts)	5
US Billboard Hot 100	76
US Hot R&B/Hip-Hop Songs (Billboard)	32
US Rap Songs (Billboard)	36

=== Year-end charts ===
Chart (2001)	Position
Europe (Eurochart Hot 100)	97
Germany (Official German Charts)	59
Switzerland (Schweizer Hitparade)	60
UK Singles (OCC)	185

== Certifications ==
Certification for "X"
Region	Certification	Certified units/sales
New Zealand (RMNZ)	Platinum	30,000^{‡}
^{‡} Sales+streaming figures based on certification alone.
