= 21 & Over =

21 & Over may refer to:

- 21 & Over (film), a 2013 American comedy film
- 21 & Over (album), the debut album by West Coast hip hop group, Tha Alkaholiks
