= Rap Life =

Studio album by Tash
- Released: November 2, 1999
- Recorded: 1998–99
- Studio: Skip Saylor Recording; Enterprise Studios; Troposphere Studios; Mirror Image Studios; Soundcastle
- Genre: West Coast hip hop
- Length: 56:24
- Label: Loud; Columbia
- Producer: DJ Battlecat; E-Swift; Fredwreck; Knobody; Minnesota; Rockwilder; Sir Jinx; Younglord

Tash chronology
Likwidation (1997)	Rap Life (1999)	X.O. Experience (2001)

Singles from Rap Life
- 1. "Rap Life" Released: 1999; 2. "Bermuda Triangle" Released: March 23, 1999

Professional ratings
Review scores
Source	Rating
AllMusic	4/5 stars
Los Angeles Times	3/4 stars
Q	2/5 stars
The Source	3.5/5 stars

Rap Life is the debut solo studio album by American rapper Tash. It was released on November 2, 1999, via Loud Records. The recording sessions took place at Skip Saylor Recording, Enterprise Studios, Troposphere Studios, Mirror Image Studios, and Soundcastle. The production was handled by E-Swift, Fredwreck, Minnesota, Rockwilder, DJ Battlecat, Knobody, Younglord and Sir Jinx. It features guest appearances from Tha Alkaholiks, Phil Da Agony, B-Real, Carl Thomas, Kurupt, L.V., Outkast, Philip Johnson, Raekwon, Xzibit and Ice-T. The album reached number 148 on the Billboard 200, number 28 on the Top R&B/Hip-Hop Albums and topped the Heatseekers Albums chart in the United States. Its singles—"Rap Life" and "Bermuda Triangle"—were minor success landing on the Hot Rap Songs at No. 45 and 39, respectively.

== Track listing ==
No.	Title	Writer(s)	Producer(s)	Length
1.	"Ricochet"	Rico Smith; Eric Brooks; Sean Combs; Christopher Wallace; Nashiem Myrick; Herb Magidson; Allie Wrubel	E-Swift	3:15
2.	"Cops Skit"		Sir Jinx	0:14
3.	"G'z Iz G'z" (featuring Kurupt)	R. Smith; Ricardo Brown; Kevin Gilliam; George Clinton; William Collins; Leon Haywood; Reginald Noble; Bernie Worrell	DJ Battlecat	4:31
4.	"Pimpin' Ain't Easy"	R. Smith; Mark Richardson; Harry Wayne Casey; Richard Finch	Minnesota	3:15
5.	"Rap Life" (featuring Raekwon)	R. Smith; Corey Woods; Richard Frierson	Younglord	4:51
6.	"The Game" (featuring Carl Thomas)	R. Smith; Carl Thomas; Jerome Foster; Maurice White	Knobody	4:13
7.	"Game Show Skit"		Sir Jinx	0:18
8.	"Only When I'm Drunker" (performed by Tha Alkaholiks and Phillip Johnson)	R. Smith; Brooks; James Robinson; Richardson; August Moon; William Tyrone Thomas	Minnesota	4:28
9.	"Goggles Skit" (featuring Danielle O'Donnell and E-Swift)	R. Smith; Brooks	Sir Jinx	1:03
10.	"Nightfall"	R. Smith; Farid Nassar	Fredwreck	3:46
11.	"Bill Clinton Skit" (featuring Troy D. Duran)		E-Swift	1:04
12.	"Smokefest 1999" (featuring Phil da Agony, Outkast and B-Real)	R. Smith; Jason Smith; Antwan Patton; André Benjamin; Brooks	E-Swift	4:59
13.	"Fallin' On"	R. Smith; Dana Stinson; David Axelrod	Rockwilder	3:25
14.	"Tash Rules" (featuring LV)	R. Smith; Larry Sanders; Stinson	Rockwilder	3:49
15.	"Ice-T Skit" (featuring Ice-T)		E-Swift	0:55
16.	"True Homies" (featuring Phil da Agony and Xzibit)	R. Smith; J. Smith; Alvin Joiner; Brooks	E-Swift	4:50
17.	"Blackula" (performed by Tha Alkaholiks)	R. Smith; Brooks; Robinson	E-Swift	3:42
18.	"Bermuda Triangle"	R. Smith; Brooks	E-Swift	4:11
Total length:				56:24

== Charts ==
Chart (1999)	Peak position
US Billboard 200	148
US Top R&B/Hip-Hop Albums (Billboard)	28
US Heatseekers Albums (Billboard)	1

=== Singles ===
Year	Song	Chart positions	
Year	Song	US R&B	US Rap
1999	"Rap Life"	86	45
1999	"Bermuda Triangle"	—	39
