= Symphony in X Major =

Single by Xzibit featuring Dr. Dre

from the album Man vs. Machine
- B-side: "Harder"
- Released: December 9, 2002
- Genre: Hip-hop
- Length: 3:55
- Label: Loud
- Songwriters: Alvin Joiner; Andre Young
- Producer: Rick Rock

Xzibit singles chronology
"Choke Me, Spank Me (Pull My Hair)" (2002)	"Symphony in X Major" (2002)	"Hey Now (Mean Muggin)" (2004)

Dr. Dre singles chronology
"The Wash" (2002)	"Symphony in X Major" (2002)	"Encore" (2004)

"Symphony in X Major" was the second and final single released from Xzibit's fourth album named Man vs. Machine. It features Dr. Dre, is produced by Rick Rock and samples a portion of Johann Sebastian Bach's "Brandenburg Concerto No. 3". Dr. Dre mixed the song.

A music video was shot for the song directed by Joe Hahn of Linkin Park. Dr. Dre does not appear in the video. It reached number 43 in the Australian singles chart.

== Composition ==
"Symphony in X Major" samples two extracts of Johann Sebastian Bach's "Brandenburg Concerto No. 3" as interpreted by Wendy Carlos on her 1968 Switched-On Bach album. These two samples are taken from the composition's middle section where it transitions into the relative minor key, "useful in reinforcing the menacing tone of the hip-hop track."

The first corresponds to bars 70-71 of the concerto and appears in the introduction and choruses of the song, while the second is taken from bars 68-69, and is used in the verses and the outro, giving the song a contrasting verse-chorus structure.

== Charts ==
Chart performance of "Symphony in X Major"
Chart (2002–2003)	Peak position
Australia (ARIA)	43
Australian Urban (ARIA)	16
US Hot R&B/Hip-Hop Songs (Billboard)	63

== Release history ==
Release history and formats for "Symphony in X Major"
Region	Date	Format(s)	Label(s)	Ref.
United States	November 25, 2002	Rhythmic contemporary; urban contemporary radio	Loud; Columbia	
