= Get Your Walk On =

2001 song performed by Xzibit

Single by Xzibit

from the album Restless
- Released: April 2001
- Length: 3:39
- Label: Epic; Loud; SRC; Open Bar
- Songwriter: A. Joiner
- Producers: Mel-Man & Battlecat

Xzibit singles chronology
"Front 2 Back" (2000)	"Get Your Walk On" (2001)	"Multiply" (2002)

"Get Your Walk On" was the third and final single by American rapper Xzibit, from his 2000 album, Restless. The song is produced by Mel-Man and Battlecat.

The music video, directed by Smith n' Borin, features various footage of Xzibit (both on stage and backstage) during live concerts and while he's with his friends and fans. Staying true with the name of the song, it also features various kids performing the Crip Walk (as well as Xzibit himself). There is a scene where two sets of kids are standing alongside two sides of a pyramid with one side red and the other side blue- referring to the intense rivalry between the Bloods and the Crips. However this could also symbolize the peace treaty between the two conflicting gangs as well. DJ Quik and WC make cameo appearances. In their cameos, they are seen doing dances that are affiliated with their respective gangs: DJ Quik is seen doing the Blood Bounce and WC is seen doing the Crip Walk.

== Certifications ==
Certification for "Get Your Walk On"
Region	Certification	Certified units/sales
New Zealand (RMNZ)	Gold	15,000^{‡}
^{‡} Sales+streaming figures based on certification alone.
