= Todd Smith (album) =

Studio album by LL Cool J
- Released: April 11, 2006
- Genre: Hip-hop
- Length: 51:47
- Label: Def Jam
- Producers: Bink!; Jermaine Dupri; Lyfe Jennings; Keezo Kane; LL Cool J; The Narcotics; The Neptunes; Poke and Tone; Stargate; Scott Storch; Shea Taylor

LL Cool J chronology
The DEFinition (2004)	Todd Smith (2006)	Exit 13 (2008)

Singles from Todd Smith
- 1. "It's LL and Santana"/"What You Want" Released: November 10, 2005; 2. "Control Myself" Released: February 1, 2006; 3. "Freeze" Released: April 5, 2006

Todd Smith is the eleventh studio album by American rapper LL Cool J. It was released on April 11, 2006, by Def Jam Recordings. The album features collaborations with Jennifer Lopez, Pharrell Williams, Juelz Santana, Teairra Mari, Jamie Foxx, Ginuwine, Mary J. Blige, 112, Mary Mary, Ryan Toby, and Freeway. Titled after LL Cool J's middle and last name, it includes production from The Neptunes, Scott Storch, Bink!, Shea Taylor, Keezo Kane, and Trackmasters, among others.

Critics characterized the album as polished, commercially oriented pop-rap, while criticizing its cautious approach, reliance on guest appearances, and lack of the artistic impact found in his earlier work. Todd Smith debuted and peaked at number six on the US Billboard 200 with first-week sales of 116,000 copies and was certified gold by the Recording Industry Association of America (RIAA) on May 18, 2006. Lead single "Control Myself," another collaboration with singer Jennifer Lopez, became a top five hit in Canada, Ireland, the United Kingdom, and the United States.

== Background ==
For his next project, LL Cool J worked with an unprecedented number of guest artists, including Jennifer Lopez, Jamie Foxx, Ginuwine, Teairra Mari, 112, Mary Mary, Ryan Toby, and others. Reflecting on the process, he described it as “crazy” in its scale, explaining that guest appearances often evolved organically: "We would hear a song and be like, 'This would be great for such and such to be on. Mary would sound good on this. Lyfe would sound good on this.' It just kind of evolved."

He likened the album to Dr. Dre's debut album The Chronic (1992), noting that, like Dre's landmark record, everyone was deeply involved in both the writing and the music, with ideas bouncing back and forth freely, a level of collaboration he had never attempted on an entire album before. He further elaborated: "I tried to put together something that would be a little more inclusive and open and interesting to people. I approached the writing a little differently. It was more collaborative as far as the writing, in terms of the song selection and ideas."

Todd Smith is composed of radio-friendly hip hop, with LL Cool J foregoing street material in favor of straightforward, commercial pop-rap. Much of the album is built on minimalist, distilled synthesized rap, featuring thick drum swirls and bright record production. The lyrics demonstrate LL Cool J comfortably rapping slow songs exclusively aimed at the opposite sex. Titled after LL Cool J's middle and last name, he decide to name the album Todd Smith because he "was so open, opening up so much more on every level. Why not open up and let people know it's a peek inside of me and my process and my life? I think the [album] accomplishes that."

== Promotion ==
Jermaine Dupri-produced dance track "Control Myself" served as the album's lead single. Another song with singer Jennifer Lopez after their collaboration on "All I Have" on Lopez's 2002 album This Is Me... Then, it was originally to feature Fergie from the Black Eyed Peas; however difference in terms of payment resulted in her being replaced by Lopez. LL Cool J and Lopez shot a music video for "Control Myself," directed by Hype Williams, on January 2, 2006 at Sony Studios, New York. "Freeze," a song about of a man unable to settle down, acutely aware that the woman he might one day marry is slipping away from him, featuring Lyfe Jennings, was released as the album's second single.

== Critical reception ==
Professional ratings
Aggregate scores
Source	Rating
Metacritic	51/100
Review scores
Source	Rating
About.com	3/5 stars
AllMusic	2.5/5 stars
Entertainment Weekly	C+
PopMatters	5/10 stars
RapReviews	7.5/10
Rolling Stone	1/5 stars
Slant Magazine	3/5 stars
Stylus Magazine	C−
Vibe	3.5/5 stars
XXL	(M)

Todd Smith was met with "mixed or average" reviews from critics. At Metacritic, which assigns a weighted average rating out of 100 to reviews from mainstream publications, this release received an average score of 51 based on 17 reviews. AllMusic found that "the album proves that Cool James always has and always will have wit and style to spare" and while he "makes few pretenses to being street, Todd Smith is straight commercial pop-rap," resulting into "solid radio-friendly hip-hop from a veteran of the genre." Michael Frauenhofer from PopMatters described the album as "adequate [...] glossy, safe, front-loaded, and slick. My mom likes it, enough said. And the young-girl LL Cool J fans will love it too, regardless of what we say here. As for the rest of us? We can go home, we can play "Mama Said Knock You Out" and "Rock the Bells" on our stereos, and we can wait for his next inevitable metamorphosis."

Entertainment Weekly's Tom Sinclair criticized the album for its "big-name-guest-star-choked affairs" and wrote: "Too bad LL Cool J feels he needs the extra wattage, because Todd Smith's best moments come when he raps alone, letting his inimitably confident flow shine. Some of these jams will no doubt click with the club crowd, but we wish our man would jettison the human baggage, team up with his old producer Rick Rubin, and knock us out again." Similarly, Rolling Stone critic Peter Relic remarked: "Eight of thirteen tracks on Todd Smith qualify as slow-jam duets, and none of them has a sweat droplet of the appeal of 1987's LL-as-Lothario classic "I Need Love" [...] leaving one wondering whatever happened to the immortal MC who could carry an album by himself without needing a breath."

== Chart performance ==
Todd Smith debuted and peaked at six on the US Billboard 200, selling 116,000 units in first week of release. This marked LL Cool J's 11th and his eighth top ten title on the Billboard 200. The set also opened at number two on both the Top R&B/Hip-Hop Albums and the Top Rap Albums charts. Todd Smith was certified gold by the Recording Industry Association of America (RIAA) on May 18, 2006 . By May 2008, it had sold 535,000 copies in the United States, according to Nielsen SoundScan.

== Track listing ==
Todd Smith track listing
No.	Title	Writer(s)	Producer(s)	Length
1.	"It's LL and Santana" (featuring Juelz Santana)	James Todd Smith; Shea Taylor; Eugene Record; Tony Churchill; Melvin Wilson; Leslie Wilson; V. Bullock	Taylor	3:00
2.	"Control Myself" (featuring Jennifer Lopez)	J. Smith; Jermaine Dupri; James Phillips; Ryan Toby; John Miller; Afrika Bambaataa; Arthur Baker; John Robie	Dupri; LRoc^{[a]}	3:53
3.	"Favorite Flavor" (featuring Mary J. Blige)	J. Smith; Jean-Claude Olivier; Samuel Barnes; Toby	Poke and Tone	3:26
4.	"Freeze" (featuring Lyfe Jennings)	J. Smith; Jennings	LL Cool J; Jennings	4:52
5.	"Best Dress" (featuring Jamie Foxx)	J. Smith; Shawn Carter; Christopher J. Gholson; Pharrell Williams; Rodney Hill	The Neptunes; Drumma Boy^{[a]}	3:57
6.	"Preserve the Sexy" (featuring Teairra Mari)	J. Smith; Keith Moore; S. Smith; James Brown; Bobby Byrd; Ron Lenhoff; Charles Bobbit	Keezo Kane	3:39
7.	"What You Want" (featuring Freeway)	J. Smith; Leslie Pridgeon; Angelo Badalamenti; Albert Elias; K. Elcock; I. Heyward; M. Oliver	The Narcotics	4:24
8.	"I've Changed" (featuring Ryan Toby)	J. Smith; Olivier; Barnes; Toby	Poke and Tone	3:50
9.	"Ooh Wee" (featuring Ginuwine)	J. Smith; Toby; Scott Storch	Storch	4:02
10.	"#1 Fan"	J. Smith; Olivier; Barnes; Toby	Poke and Tone	3:17
11.	"Down the Aisle" (featuring 112)	J. Smith; Olivier; Barnes; Toby; Monte Moir; Marvin Scandrick; Quinnes Parker; Daron Jones; Alexander O'Neal; Michael Keith	Poke and Tone	4:01
12.	"We're Gonna Make It" (featuring Mary Mary)	J. Smith; Erica Campbell; Trecina Atkins-Campbell; Toby; Carole King	Bink	4:55

Bonus track
No.	Title	Writer(s)	Producer(s)	Length
13.	"So Sick" (Remix featuring Ne-Yo)	J. Smith; Tor Erik Hermansen; Mikkel S. Eriksen; Shaffer Smith	Stargate; Poke and Tone^{[b]}	4:23

UK bonus track
No.	Title	Writer(s)	Producer(s)	Length
14.	"Control Myself" (Nevins Funktek remix featuring Jennifer Lopez)	J. Smith; Dupri; Phillips; Toby; Miller; Bambaataa; Baker; Robie	Dupri; LRoc^{[a]}; Jason Nevins^{[b]}	3:46

Japanese bonus track
No.	Title	Writer(s)	Producer(s)	Length
15.	"Control Myself" (Joe Bermudez radio edit featuring Jennifer Lopez)	J. Smith; Dupri; Phillips; Toby; Miller; Bambaataa; Baker; Robie	Dupri; LRoc^{[a]}; Joe Bermudez^{[b]}	3:49

Notes

- ^{^[a]} signifies a co-producer
- ^{^[b]} signifies an additional producer

Sample credits

- "It's LL and Santana" contains a sample from "Blind Man" as performed by New Birth.
- "Control Myself" contains a sample from "Looking for the Perfect Beat" by Afrika Bambaataa & Soul Sonic Force.
- "Preserve the Sexy":
  - Contains a sample of the recording "From the Love Side" as performed by Hank Ballard & the Midnight Lighters.
  - Contains a sample of "Get Up, Get Into It, Get Involved (Parts I & II)", "Make It Funky (Part I)" and "My Thang" as performed by James Brown.
- "What You Want":
  - Contains a sample of "Hot Wheels (The Case)" as performed by Badder Than Evil.
  - Contains an interpolation of "Heaven and Hell on Earth" as written by M. Oliver.
  - Contains a sample of "Nobody Beats the Biz" as performed by Biz Markie.
- "Down the Aisle" contains a sample of "If You Were Here Tonight" as performed by Alexander O'Neal.
- "We're Gonna Make It" contains samples form the recording "You've Got a Friend" as performed by Donny Hathaway.
- "So Sick (Remix)" contains replayed elements from "Human Nature" as performed by Michael Jackson.

== Charts ==
=== Weekly charts ===
Weekly chart performance for Todd Smith
Chart (2006)	Peak position
Belgian Albums (Ultratop Flanders)	88
Canadian Albums (Nielsen SoundScan)	40
Dutch Albums (Album Top 100)	99
Swiss Albums (Schweizer Hitparade)	64
UK Albums (Official Charts)	79
UK R&B Albums (Official Charts)	8
US Billboard 200	6
US Top R&B/Hip-Hop Albums (Billboard)	2

=== Year-end charts ===
Year-end chart performance for Todd Smith
Chart (2006)	Position
US Top R&B/Hip-Hop Albums (Billboard)	65

== Certifications ==
Certifications for Todd Smith
Region	Certification	Certified units/sales
United States (RIAA)	Gold	500,000^{^}
^{^} Shipments figures based on certification alone.
