= Open Bar Entertainment =

- Parent company: Sony Music
- Founded: 2000
- Founder: Xzibit
- Distributors: Epic Records; Columbia Records
- Genre: West Coast hip hop; Hip Hop
- Country of origin: United States

Open Bar Entertainment (also known as Almighty Open Bar Entertainment) is an American record label founded in 2000 by American rapper Xzibit. It operated as a subsidiary label under Epic Records, and then Columbia Records.

== History ==
Xzibit stated "I started a label called Open Bar, being that I gotta take advantage of everything that's happening around me right now, I just feel like Likwit Crew never got our fair share in the market place. Whether it was us, whether it was the promotion, whether it was the label...that's not for me to argue about. But what I can do is, since I got my hands around the opportunity, I'll of course, embrace my family members and bring them to the table with me. The first person I signed was King Tee. I also signed Defari and I'm bringing the Golden State Warriors over there. So I'm gonna go ahead and we're going to develop them, and bring them into the circle, putting my family together, coming out correctly."

Following the moderately successful releases of Xzibit's first two albums, At the Speed of Life and 40 Dayz & 40 Nightz, Xzibit was granted his own label under Loud Records, which at the time received distribution from Epic Records. He subsequently signed rapper Defari to Open Bar, and he remains, besides Xzibit, the only other artist signed to the label. Open Bar's first release was Xzibit's third studio album, Restless, which featured guest appearances from Defari. The album was the best selling album for both Open Bar and Xzibit, peaking in the top 15 on the Billboard 200 and was certified platinum by the RIAA for selling a million copies in America. Restless was supported by the commercially successful single, X. Around this time, Xzibit and Open Bar began prepping for releases by both Defari and The Golden State Project, a trio consisting of Xzibit, Saafir, and Ras Kass. An album by Defari was slated for a summer 2001 release, but was shelved after Defari left the label that year. A Golden State Project album was slated for a Fall 2001 release, but was later delayed

In 2002, Xzibit released his fourth studio album Man vs. Machine. The album spawned three singles, which all failed to chart in the Hot 100, although "Multiply" reached number 39 in the UK and 33 in Germany. The album itself was certified Gold by the RIAA. The album is his highest-charting album to date, reaching number 3 in the U.S. and 8 in Canada. It was the final album to be released in a joint venture between Loud and Open Bar, as Loud dissolved in 2003. Following the release of the album, in 2003, Xzibit signed directly to Columbia Records. The Golden State Project's much delayed album, The Coast Is Clear, by this time was scheduled to be released in 2003, but was permanently shelved.

In December 2004, Xzibit released his fifth studio album, Weapons of Mass Destruction, through Columbia and Open Bar. The album peaked at number 43 on the Billboard 200, but managed to be certified Gold by the RIAA due to shipping 500,000 copies in America. Feeling that the album was not promoted properly, Xzibit left Columbia Records in 2006.

== Artists ==
- Xzibit
- Defari (former)

== Discography ==
- Restless
- Man Vs. Machine
- Weapons of Mass Destruction
- Full Circle
- Napalm

== See also ==
- List of record labels
