= Keezo Kane =

American hip-hop producer (born 1979)

Keezo Kane (born Keith Moore, 7 June 1979) is an American hip-hop producer. In 2004, he signed to Kanye West's G.O.O.D. Music label.

== Production credits ==
- Right About Now (Talib Kweli album, 2005) : "The Beast" (featuring Papoose)
- Firewater (Tha Alkaholiks album, 2006) : "Popular Demand"
- Todd Smith (LL Cool J album, 2006) : "Preserve The Sexy" (featuring Teairra Mari)
- MTV Presents: My Block Chicago Soundtrack (MTV album, 2006) : "Let's Get It Poppin'" (performed by GLC)
- Finally Famous Vol.1 (Big Sean mixtape, 2007) : "Dreams"
- Don't Quit Your Day Job! (Consequence album, 2007) : "Who Knew My Luck Would Change"
- Shine (Estelle album, 2008) : "More Than Friends"
- True to the Game (Stadium Entertainment Corp album, 2009) : "The Big Screen" (performed by GLC featuring Kanye West)
- Love, Life, & Loyalty (GLC album, 2010) : "So Real" (featuring BJ the Chicago Kid)
- Love, Life, & Loyalty (GLC album, 2010) : "I Did It"
- To Mars (Trey Diggz album, 2011) : "I'm on Fire"
