= Firewater (Tha Alkaholiks album) =

Studio album by Tha Alkaholiks
- Released: January 24, 2006
- Recorded: 2005
- Studios: Street Soul Studios (Los Angeles, California)
- Genre: Hip-hop
- Length: 55:46
- Labels: Waxploitation; Koch
- Producers: Breakmecanix; Danger Mouse; E-Swift; Evidence; J-Ro; Keezo Kane; The Rural

Tha Alkaholiks chronology
X.O. Experience (2001)	Firewater (2006)

Singles from Firewater
- 1. "The Flute Song (LaLaLa)" Released: 2006

Firewater is the fifth and final studio album by American hip-hop group Tha Alkaholiks. It was released on January 24, 2006, via Waxploitation/Koch Records. Recording sessions took place at Street Soul Studios in Los Angeles. Production was handled by members E-Swift and J-Ro, The Rural, Breakmecanix, Danger Mouse, Evidence and Keezo Kane. It features guest appearances from Bishop Lamont, King T and Styliztik Jones.

== Critical reception ==
Professional ratings
Aggregate scores
Source	Rating
Metacritic	67/100
Review scores
Source	Rating
AllMusic	3/5 stars
The A.V. Club	B
HipHopDX	4/5
Los Angeles Times	3/4 stars
Now	2/5 Ns
PopMatters	5/10
Prefix	3/5 stars
RapReviews	7/10
Slant Magazine	3/5 stars
Spin	B−

Firewater was met with generally favorable reviews from music critics. At Metacritic, which assigns a normalized rating out of 100 to reviews from mainstream publications, the album received an average score of 67, based on nine reviews.

Soren Baker of Los Angeles Times called it "a rare modern-day rap album that is as fun as it is good". Nathan Rabin of The A.V. Club resumed: "far from classic, but pretty damn fun nonetheless". Spin reviewer described the album as "like your favorite dive bar, it feels uncomfortably familiar".

In mixed reviews, AllMusic's Andy Kellman noticed: "what prevents the album from being on par with the likes of 21 & Over and Coast II Coast is that the MCs have slowed a little with age". Adrian Covert of Prefix magazine wrote: "the members of Tha Alkaholiks may not have wrapped up their stellar career with the bang many had hoped for, but I'll still drink to this". Eric Neigher of Slant magazine stated "much of Firewater has a blast-from-the-past feel". Michael Frauenhofer of PopMatters wrote: "it may not be their best album, but where it doesn’t really add to their legacy, neither does it really tarnish". NOW magazine reviewer found out that "their beats and rhymes reflect none of the punchliney fun they used to have".

== Track listing ==
No.	Title	Writer(s)	Producer(s)	Length
1.	"Intro"		E-Swift	0:29
2.	"Turn It Up"	James Robinson; Rico Smith; Eric Brooks; Mårten Sakwanda	Breakmecanix; J-Ro	3:04
3.	"The Flute Song (LaLaLa)"	Smith; Robinson; Brooks	E-Swift	4:10
4.	"Popular Demand"	Robinson; Smith; Brooks; Keith Moore	Keezo Kane	3:40
5.	"The Get Down"	Robinson; Smith; Brooks	E-Swift	3:32
6.	"Get into It"	Smith; Robinson; Brooks; James Dring	The Rural	4:14
7.	"Faded"	Brooks; Danica Rozelle	E-Swift	1:32
8.	"Chaos"	Robinson; Smith; Brooks; Brian Burton	Danger Mouse	3:03
9.	"Hangover" (featuring Styliztik Jones and Bishop Lamont)	Douglas Jones; Robinson; Philip Martin; Brooks	E-Swift	4:22
10.	"Party Ya Ass Off"	Smith; Robinson; Brooks	E-Swift	3:47
11.	"Handle It"	Smith; Robinson; Michael Perretta; Brooks	Evidence; E-Swift	3:18
12.	"On the Floor"	Smith; Robinson; Brooks	E-Swift	4:19
13.	"Poverty's Paradise"	Robinson; Smith; Brooks; Alex Rowe	E-Swift	3:26
14.	"Drink Wit Us"	Robinson; Brooks; Smith	E-Swift	5:24
15.	"Do It"	Robinson; Smith; Brooks; Dring; Jody Street	The Rural; E-Swift (add.); The Street Soul Symphony (add.)	3:38
16.	"Over Here" (featuring King Tee)	Smith; Roger McBride; Robinson; Brooks	E-Swift	3:48
Total length:				55:46

== Charts ==
Chart (2006)	Peak position
US Independent Albums (Billboard)	38
