= Control Myself =

2006 single by LL Cool J

Single by LL Cool J featuring Jennifer Lopez

from the album Todd Smith
- Released: February 7, 2006
- Studio: South Side Studios (Atlanta, GA); Sony Music Studios (New York, NY)
- Genre: Hip-hop; R&B
- Length: 3:53
- Label: Def Jam
- Songwriters: James Smith; Ryan Toby; Jermaine Mauldin
- Producer: Jermaine Dupri

LL Cool J singles chronology
"It's LL and Santana" (2005)	"Control Myself" (2006)	"Freeze" (2006)

Jennifer Lopez singles chronology
"Hold You Down" (2005)	"Control Myself" (2006)	"Qué Hiciste" (2007)

"Control Myself" is a song by American rapper LL Cool J from his eleventh studio album, Todd Smith (2006). The song was written by Jermaine Dupri and Ryan Toby. The song was produced by Dupri, with co-production by LRoc, and features guest vocals from American singer Jennifer Lopez. "Control Myself" contains a sample of Afrika Bambaataa and Soulsonic Force's 1983 song "Looking for the Perfect Beat", while the vocals interpolate Bambaataa and Soulsonic Force's 1982 song "Planet Rock".

== Background ==
"Control Myself" was written by LL Cool along with Jermaine Dupri and Ryan Toby for the former's eleventh studio album, Todd Smith (2006). Production was overseen by Dupri, with co-production from LRoc. The song contains a sample of Afrika Bambaataa and Soulsonic Force's 1983 song "Looking for the Perfect Beat", while the vocals interpolate Bambaataa and Soulsonic Force's 1982 song "Planet Rock". On Dupri's idea to use the former, LL Cool J commented: "[He] is a genius. Very intelligent, brilliant. When I heard that Afrika Bambaataa "Looking for the Perfect Beat" [sample on the track], I felt like that was the move." Dupri also recommended that LL should use his flow from "Going Back to Cali" for "Control Myself." Fergie was initially considered as a guest vocalist for the song, though the collaboration did not materialize. She was ultimately replaced by Jennifer Lopez, with whom LL Cool J had previously recorded the number-one hit "All I Have" (2002).

== Commercial performance ==
Released as the lead single from Todd Smith in February 2006, the song spent eleven weeks on the US Billboard Hot 100, peaking at number four. When it became available as a digital download in April, it shot to number two on the Billboard Hot Digital Songs chart and re-entered the Hot 100 at number four — surpassing the previous re-entry record held by Jay-Z's 1998 hit "Hard Knock Life (Ghetto Anthem)", which had returned to the chart at number 20 in 1999. Elsewhere, "Control Myself" became a top ten hit in Canada, Ireland, New Zealand, and Scotland, at times marking LL Cool J's highest-charting single in several years. It also climbed to number two in the United Kingdom, matching the success of LL Cool J and Lopez's earlier collaboration, "All I Have," from 2002. The single has since been certified Silver by the British Phonographic Industry (BPI), with sales totaling 188,000 units in the UK.

== Music video ==
A music video for "Control Myself" was directed by Hype Williams and filmed at Sony Studios in New York City on January 2, 2006. As with some of Williams' other videos, footage appears in the black bars that would normally show on a 4:3 fullscreen TV ratio for a widescreen production, a style he first introduced in Ashanti's video for "Only U" (2003). LL Cool J, who dubbed Williams "Hype Spielberg," praised this technique: "I love it. I think it's great. It gives you more information, it gives you a chance to watch three, four videos at one time and have a great time. Every time you watch it, you can focus on one of the letterboxes and have a different experience. You get to experience the record that much more." He also commented on the final product: "It's wild. I feel real good about that, it's real different for both of us." “Control Myself” was released in the United States on February 13, 2006, and in Europe on February 19, 2006. The video peaked at number two on MTV's Total Request Live, number three on BET's 106 & Park, and number eighteen on VH1's VSpot Top 20 Countdown.

== Track listings ==
US 12-inch single

A1. "Control Myself" (Radio) – 3:54
A2. "Control Myself" (Instrumental) – 3:54
B1. "Control Myself" (Radio) – 3:54
B2. "Control Myself" (Instrumental) – 3:54

UK 12-inch single

A1. "Control Myself" (Album Version) – 3:54
A2. "Control Myself" (Instrumental) – 3:54
B1. "Control Myself" (Jason Nevins Electrotex Club Mix) – 8:53

German 12-inch single

A. "Control Myself" (Explicit Version) – 3:58
B. "Control Myself" (Instrumental) – 3:54

European CD maxi single

1. "Control Myself" – 3:56
2. "Control Myself" (Jason Nevins Funktek Edit) – 4:02
3. "Control Myself" (Instrumental) – 3:54
4. "Control Myself" (Video)

European CD single

1. "Control Myself" – 3:56
2. "Control Myself" (Jason Nevins Funktek Edit) – 4:02

== Credits and personnel ==
Credits lifted from the liner notes of Todd Smith.

- Jermaine Dupri – producer, writer
- John Horesco IV – recording engineer
- LL Cool J – vocalist, writer
- Jennifer Lopez – vocalist
- LRoc – co-producer
- Phil Tan – mixing engineer
- Ryan Toby – writer
- Peter Wade – recording engineer

== Charts ==
=== Weekly charts ===
Weekly chart performance for "Control Myself"
Chart (2006)	Peak position
Australia (ARIA)	17
Australian Urban (ARIA)	6
Austria (Ö3 Austria Top 40)	70
Belgium (Ultratop 50 Flanders)	14
Belgium (Ultratip Bubbling Under Wallonia)	1
Canada (Nielsen SoundScan)	4
CIS Airplay (TopHit)	57
Denmark (Tracklisten)	25
Europe (Eurochart Hot 100)	7
Finland (Suomen virallinen lista)	11
Germany (GfK)	25
Greece (IFPI)	12
Ireland (IRMA)	5
Netherlands (Dutch Top 40)	13
Netherlands (Single Top 100)	19
New Zealand (Recorded Music NZ)	7
Scottish Singles Sales (Official Charts)	3
UK Singles (Official Charts)	2
UK Hip Hop/R&B (Official Charts)	2
US Billboard Hot 100	4
US Dance Club Songs (Billboard)	14
US Hot R&B/Hip-Hop Songs (Billboard)	28
US Hot Rap Songs (Billboard)	9

=== Year-end charts ===
Year-end chart performance for "Control Myself"
Chart (2006)	Position
Australian Urban (ARIA)	31
Belgium (Ultratop 50 Flanders)	66
CIS (TopHit)	179
UK Singles (OCC)	48
UK Urban (Music Week)	8

== Sales and certifications ==
Certifications for "Control Myself"
Region	Certification	Certified units/sales
United Kingdom (BPI)	Silver	188,000
United States (RIAA)	Gold	500,000^{‡}
^{‡} Sales+streaming figures based on certification alone.

== Release history ==
Release dates and formats for "Control Myself"
Region	Date	Format	Label	Ref.
United States	February 7, 2006	Rhythmic/crossover radio	Island Def Jam	
United States	February 14, 2006	12-inch single	Island Def Jam	
Russia	February 28, 2006	Contemporary hit radio	Island Def Jam	
United States	April 11, 2006	Digital download (extended dance remixes)	Island Def Jam	
Germany	April 28, 2006	CD single	Island Def Jam	
United Kingdom	May 8, 2006	CD single	Island Def Jam	
