= Weapons of Mass Destruction (album) =

Studio album by Xzibit
- Released: December 14, 2004
- Recorded: 2003–2004
- Studios: Encore Studios (Burbank, CA); Soundcastle (Los Angeles, CA); N House Studios (Studio City, CA); Hit Factory (Miami, FL); Teklab Studios (Cincinnati, OH); Khalil's Home Studio (Los Angeles, CA)
- Genres: West Coast hip hop; hardcore hip hop
- Length: 1:01:14
- Labels: Columbia; Sony Urban; Open Bar
- Producers: Xzibit (exec.); DJ Battlecat; DJ Khalil; Hi-Tek; Jelly Roll; Mr. Porter; Mystro; Rick Rock; Sir Jinx; Thayod Ausar; Timbaland

Xzibit chronology
Man vs. Machine (2002)	Weapons of Mass Destruction (2004)	Full Circle (2006)

Singles from Weapons of Mass Destruction
- 1. "Muthafucka" Released: September 21, 2004; 2. "Hey Now (Mean Muggin)" Released: November 15, 2004; 3. "Criminal Set" Released: December 14, 2004

Weapons of Mass Destruction is the fifth studio album by American rapper Xzibit. It was released on December 14, 2004, through Columbia Records, Sony Urban Music, and Xzibit's Open Bar Entertainment. Recording sessions took place at Encore Studios in Burbank, Soundcastle Studios and Khalil's Home Studio in Los Angeles, N House Studios in Studio City, Hit Factory in Miami and Teklab Studios in Cincinnati. Production was handled by DJ Khalil, Jelly Roll, Hi-Tek, DJ Battlecat, Denaun Porter, Mystro, Rick Rock, Sir Jinx, Thayod Ausar and Timbaland, with additional producer J. R. Rotem. It features guest appearances from Strong Arm Steady, Jelly Roll, Busta Rhymes and Keri Hilson, and contributions from Butch Cassidy, Dion Jenkins, Dontae Winslow, Mashica Winslow, Suga Free, Tone Trezure, Truth Hurts and Dee Ray.

The album was supported with three singles: "Muthafucka", "Hey Now (Mean Muggin)" and "Criminal Set", as well as accompanying music videos for the latter two.

== Critical reception ==
Professional ratings
Aggregate scores
Source	Rating
Metacritic	57/100
Review scores
Source	Rating
AllMusic	3.5/5 stars
Blender	3/5 stars
Entertainment Weekly	C−
Dotmusic	6/10
HipHopDX	4/5 stars
NME	2/10
Now	2/5 stars
RapReviews	8/10
Rolling Stone	3/5 stars
Vibe	4/5 stars

Weapons of Mass Destruction was met with mixed or average reviews from music critics. At Metacritic, which assigns a normalized rating out of 100 to reviews from mainstream publications, the album received an average score of 57, based on eight reviews.

Steve Juon of RapReviews found "the only thing really disappointing about Weapons of Mass Destruction is that Xzibit seems to have once again forsaken his Alkaholiks homies". Vibe critic called the album "brimming with energy and depth", while Blender reviewer stated: "Xzibit reinvents himself as a rapper invigorated by current events". An E! Online editor found that "sometimes it sounds like he's trying too hard".

In mixed reviews, Dotmusic critic wrote: "ethical incontinence notwithstanding, Xzibit is an undeniably charismatic vocalist, with a gift for pure, jolting, testosterone-packed aggression that leads to some rather magnificent moments". Christian Hoard of Rolling Stone found it "dragged down by too much unremarkably brawny fare" and marked "Cold World" as a key song. Chuck Mindenhall of Entertainment Weekly resumed: "ultimately as unrewarding as it is conflicted".

In NME negative review, it says: "the beats are from the worst Ice Cube album ever made and the rhymes are sub-Coolio".

== Commercial performance ==
In the United States, the album debuted at number 43 on the Billboard 200, number 19 on the Top R&B/Hip-Hop Albums and number 11 on the Top Rap Albums with approximately 81,000 copies sold in its first week of released. On February 2, 2005, it was certified Gold by the Recording Industry Association of America for shipments of over 500,000 units. According to Nielsen Soundscan data as of October 2006, the album has sold approximately 283,000 copies in the US.

The album made it to number 27 in both Germany and Switzerland, number 42 in Australia, number 62 in the Netherlands, number 69 in Austria, number 71 in Flemish Region of Belgium and number 77 in France. In the United Kingdom, the album peaked at number 85 on the UK Albums Chart, number 84 on the Scottish Albums Chart and number 14 on the UK Hip Hop and R&B Albums Chart.

== Track listing ==
No.	Title	Writer(s)	Producer(s)	Length
1.	"State of the Union"		Thayod Ausar	1:30
2.	"LAX"	Alvin Joiner; Anthony Wheaton	Sir Jinx; Mystro	3:44
3.	"Cold World" (featuring Jelly Roll)	Joiner; David Drew	Jelly Roll	3:51
4.	"Saturday Night Live" (featuring Jelly Roll, Krondon and Truth Hurts)	Joiner; Drew; Marvin Jones; Terry Franklin	Jelly Roll	4:19
5.	"Muthafucka" (featuring Jelly Roll)	Joiner; Jones; Ricardo Thomas	Rick Rock	2:55
6.	"Beware of Us" (featuring Strong Arm Steady)	Joiner; Jones; Jason Smith; Khalil Abdul-Rahman	DJ Khalil	4:10
7.	"Judgement Day" (featuring Dontae Winslow and Mashica Winslow)	Joiner; Abdul-Rahman; Lane Tietgen	DJ Khalil	3:22
8.	"Criminal Set" (featuring Krondon)	Joiner; Jones; Kevin Gilliam; O'Shea Jackson; Eric Sadler; Keith Boxley	DJ Battlecat	3:16
9.	"Hey Now (Mean Muggin)" (featuring Keri Hilson)	Joiner; Keri Lynn Hilson; Tim Mosley	Timbaland	4:21
10.	"Ride or Die" (featuring Tone Trezure and Mitchy Slick)	Joiner; Latonya Givens; Charles Mitchell; Denaun Porter; Jonathan Reuven Rotem	Mr. Porter; J. R. Rotem (add.)	4:00
11.	"Crazy Ho" (featuring Strong Arm Steady, Suga Free and Butch Cassidy)	Joiner; Jones; J. Smith; Mitchell; Dajuan Walker; Danny Means; Abdul-Rahman	DJ Khalil	4:24
12.	"Big Barking (Skit)" (featuring Dee Ray)			0:53
13.	"Tough Guy" (featuring Busta Rhymes)	Joiner; Trevor Smith; Tony Cottrell; Rotem	Hi-Tek	4:25
14.	"Scent of a Woman" (featuring Dion)	Joiner; Dion Jenkins; Cottrell	Hi-Tek	4:20
15.	"Klack" (featuring Krondon and Mitchy Slick)	Joiner; Jones; Mitchell; Abdul-Rahman; Richard Tufo	DJ Khalil	5:14
16.	"Back 2 the Way It Was"	Joiner; Eric Banks; Lynn Mack; James McClelland; Jerry Peters; Joe Walsh; Terry Trabandt	Thayod Ausar	6:30
Total length:				1:01:14

Notes

- all tracks stylised in lowercase.
- "State of the Union" is omitted from several versions of the album.
- "LAX" (also stylised as "Lax" or "L.A.X." in different versions) was used in the soundtrack for the 2004 video game Need for Speed: Underground 2.
- "Muthafucka", re-titled as "Mutha*****" in clean versions, was used in Tony Scott's 2005 film Domino and an edited version called "Mother Mother" was used in the 2004 video game Def Jam: Fight for NY.
- "Hey Now (Mean Muggin)" was used in the soundtrack for the 2004 video game NFL Street 2.
- "Klack" was used in the soundtrack for the 2005 video game Juiced.

Sample credits

- Track 7 contains samples from "It Can't Make Any Difference to Me" written by Lane Tietgen and performed by Dave Mason.
- Track 8 contains samples from "Amerikkka's Most Wanted", written by O'Shea Jackson, Eric Sadler and Keith Shocklee and performed by Ice Cube.
- Track 15 contains interpolations from "Keeps Me Satisfied" written by Richard Tufo and performed by Diamond.
- Track 16 contains excerpts from "Changin'" written by Lynn Mack, James McClellan and Jerry Peters and performed by Sharon Ridley, and interpolations from "Turn to Stone" written by Joe Walsh and Terry Trabandt.

== Personnel ==
- Alvin "Xzibit" Joiner – vocals, executive producer
- David "JellyRoll" Drew – vocals (tracks: 3–5), producer (tracks: 3, 4)
- Marvin "Krondon" Jones – vocals (tracks: 4, 6, 8, 11, 15)
- Shari "Truth Hurts" Watson – vocals (track 4)
- Jason "Phil da Agony" Smith – vocals (tracks: 6, 11)
- Dontae Winslow – vocals (track 7), horns (track 15)
- Mashica Winslow – vocals (track 7)
- Keri Hilson – vocals (track 9)
- Latonya "Tone Trezure" Givens – vocals (track 10)
- Charles "Mitchy Slick" Mitchell – vocals (tracks: 10, 11, 15)
- Dejuan "Suga Free" Walker – vocals (track 11)
- Danny "Butch Cassidy" Means – vocals (track 11)
- Dee Ray – vocals (track 12)
- Trevor "Busta Rhymes" Smith – vocals (track 13)
- Dion Jenkins – vocals (track 14)
- John "Ras Kass" Austin – voice (track 16)
- Joshua Craig Podolsky – guitar (track 2)
- "Uncle" Johnny Rogers – keyboards and arrangement (track 2)
- Daniel Seeff – guitar & bass (tracks: 7, 15)
- "DJ Khalil" Abdul-Rahman – keyboards (track 11), producer (tracks: 6, 7, 11, 15)
- Jonathan "J.R." Rotem – additional keyboards (track 11), additional producer (track 10)
- The Divine Order Horns – horns (track 15)
- Dan Silver – guitar (track 16), additional sound effects (track 1)
- Eric "Thayod" Banks – producer (tracks: 1, 16)
- Anthony "Sir Jinx" Wheaton – producer & recording (track 2), sequencing
- Mystro – producer (track 2)
- Ricardo "Rick Rock" Thomas – producer (track 5)
- Kevin "DJ Battlecat" Gilliam – producer (track 8)
- Timothy "Timbaland" Mosley – producer (track 9)
- Denaun "Kon Artis" Porter – producer (track 10)
- Tony "Hi-Tek" Cottrell – producer (tracks: 13, 14)
- Sean Tallman – recording (tracks: 2–5, 7, 8, 10, 11, 13–16)
- Richard "Segal" Huredia – recording (tracks: 2, 5, 6, 8, 10, 11, 14)
- Demacio Castellon – recording (track 9)
- Serban Ghenea – mixing
- Francis Forde – engineering assistant (tracks: 2, 4, 5, 8, 10, 13, 14)
- Thomas Rounds – engineering assistant (tracks: 2, 3, 7, 11, 15, 16)
- Jeremy MacKenzie – engineering assistant (tracks: 5, 6, 8, 10)
- Chris Gehringer – mastering
- Geneva Randolph – production coordinator (track 9)
- Bill Pettaway – production coordinator (track 9)
- Mike Evans – production coordinator (track 9)
- Chris Feldmann – art direction, design
- Patrick Fong – design
- Jonathan Mannion – photography
- Mark Machado – logo
- Dino Delvaille – A&R
- Jermaine "Janky" Salmond – film director

== Charts ==
Chart (2004–2005)	Peak position
Australian Albums (ARIA)	42
Austrian Albums (Ö3 Austria)	69
Belgian Albums (Ultratop Flanders)	71
Dutch Albums (Album Top 100)	62
French Albums (SNEP)	77
German Albums (Offizielle Top 100)	27
Scottish Albums (Official Charts)	84
Swiss Albums (Schweizer Hitparade)	27
UK Albums (Official Charts)	85
UK R&B Albums (Official Charts)	14
US Billboard 200	43
US Top R&B/Hip-Hop Albums (Billboard)	19

== Certifications ==
Region	Certification	Certified units/sales
United States (RIAA)	Gold	500,000^{^}
^{^} Shipments figures based on certification alone.
