= Hey Now (Mean Muggin) =

Single by Xzibit featuring Keri Hilson

from the album Weapons of Mass Destruction
- Released: November 16, 2004
- Recorded: 2004
- Genre: Hardcore hip hop
- Length: 4:20
- Label: Loud
- Songwriters: Keri Hilson; Alvin Joiner; Tim Mosley
- Producers: Timbaland; Danja

Xzibit singles chronology
"Ride & Smoke" (2002)	"Hey Now (Mean Muggin)" (2004)	"Criminal Set" (2004)

Keri Hilson singles chronology
"Hey Now (Mean Muggin)" (2004)	"Help" (2006)

Music video
- "Xzibit - Hey Now (Mean Muggin)" on YouTube

"Hey Now (Mean Muggin)" is the first single from American rapper Xzibit's album, Weapons of Mass Destruction. The song was produced by Timbaland and his protégé, Nate "Danja" Hills, featuring vocals by American singer and songwriter Keri Hilson. Released on November 16, 2004 in North America, the song peaked at number 93 on the U.S. Billboard Hot 100.

== Formats and track listings ==
=== CD single ===
1. "Hey Now (Mean Muggin)" (Explicit)
2. "Get Your Walk On" (Explicit)
3. "What You Can't See" (Explicit)

== Charts ==
Chart performance for "Hey Now (Mean Muggin)"
Chart (2004–2005)	Peak position
Australia (ARIA)	44
Australian Urban (ARIA)	11
Germany (GfK)	33
Ireland (IRMA)	14
Netherlands (Single Top 100)	79
New Zealand (Recorded Music NZ)	21
Scotland Singles (OCC)	16
Switzerland (Schweizer Hitparade)	42
UK Singles (OCC)	9
UK Hip Hop/R&B (OCC)	3
US Billboard Hot 100	93
US Hot R&B/Hip-Hop Songs (Billboard)	52
US Rhythmic Airplay (Billboard)	28

== Release history ==
Release history and formats for "Hey Now (Mean Muggin)"
Region	Date	Format(s)	Label(s)	Ref.
United States	October 25, 2004	Rhythmic contemporary · urban contemporary radio	Columbia	
United States	November 15, 2004	Contemporary hit radio	Columbia	
