= Man vs. Machine =

Studio album by Xzibit
- Released: October 1, 2002
- Recorded: 2001–02
- Genres: West Coast hip hop; gangsta rap
- Length: 67:14
- Labels: Columbia; Open Bar; Loud; Goliath
- Producers: Dr. Dre; Bink!; DJ Premier; Eminem; Erick Sermon; J-Beats; Jelly Roll; Mr. Porter; Rick Rock; Rockwilder; Ty Fyffe

Xzibit chronology
Restless (2000)	Man vs. Machine (2002)	Weapons of Mass Destruction (2004)

Singles from Man vs. Machine
- 1. "Multiply" Released: March 5, 2002; 2. "Symphony in X Major" Released: December 9, 2002

Professional ratings
Aggregate scores
Source	Rating
Metacritic	59/100
Review scores
Source	Rating
AllMusic	2.5/5 stars
Blender	3/5 stars
Christgau's Consumer Guide	(2-star Honorable Mention)
Entertainment Weekly	B−
HipHopDX	4/5 stars
Los Angeles Times	2.5/4 stars
NME	7/10
RapReviews	8.5/10
Rolling Stone	3/5 stars
Uncut	2/5 stars

Man vs. Machine is the fourth studio album by American rapper Xzibit. It was released on October 1, 2002 through Columbia Records, Loud Records, and Xzibit's Open Bar imprint. Special guests include Dr. Dre, Snoop Dogg, Eminem, M.O.P., Nate Dogg, Anthony Hamilton, and Eddie Griffin. Producers on the album include Rick Rock, Bink, Rockwilder, Erick Sermon, DJ Premier, and Dr. Dre (who was also the executive producer). The album debuted at number three on the Billboard 200 with over 156,000 copies sold in its first week. Since then album was certified gold by the Recording Industry Association of America (RIAA). To date, it is the last album released by Loud Records.

== Music ==
The track "My Name" which features Eminem and Nate Dogg, is a diss track aimed at Canibus, Jermaine Dupri, and Moby.

Two of the songs from Man Vs. Machine were featured in the 2005 film Domino. The specific songs were "Choke Me, Spank Me (Pull My Hair)" as well as "The Gambler", which played during the film's opening credits.

Eminem's manager, Paul Rosenberg, makes a guest appearance on the album by performing a "Paul" skit (which is a skit that is commonly used for Eminem's studio albums).

== Commercial performance ==
"Man vs. Machine" debuted at number three on the US Billboard 200 and number one on the US Top R&B/Hip-Hop Albums chart, selling 156,000 copies in its first week of release. The album spent a total of 19 weeks on the "Billboard" 200 chart. On November 12, 2002, the album was certified gold by the Recording Industry Association of America (RIAA) for sales of over 500,000 copies. It was certified shortly after a month of being released. As of November 2004, the album has sold 593,000 copies in the United States.

== Reception ==
In a retrospective review, Mitch Findlay from HotNewHipHop said: "Once again executive produced by Dr. Dre, who provided production on two tracks and mixing engineer credits on seven, Man Vs. Machine emerged at the peak of Xzibit's musical popularity. His work on Restless had ushered him from an acclaimed underground presence to a household name, an equal affiliate to Snoop Dogg, Dre, Eminem, and his Golden State Project groupmates Ras Kass and Saafir. With Man Vs. Machine, Xzibit continued to build on the foundation of its predecessor, albeit with a slight gaze toward a more futuristic aesthetic; such qualities were largely realized by Rick Rock, who contributed production on tracks like "Symphony In X Major" and "Break Yourself.". He singled out songs like "Multiply", the Dre-produced songs "Losin Your Mind" and "Choke Me, Spank Me (Pull My Hair)", "BK To LA", "My Name" and "Harder" as highlists. He also said: "If there's anything keeping Man Vs. Machine from unmitigated greatness, it might very well be the inconsistent hooks. Slight blemishes aside, X's fourth studio album is an insanely listenable, crisply mixed, and nostalgic reminder of a classic musical era."

== Track listing ==
Credits adapted from the album's liner notes.

No.	Title	Writer(s)	Producer(s)	Length
1.	"Release Date"	Dana Stinson; Alvin Joiner	Rockwilder	4:06
2.	"Symphony in X Major" (featuring Dr. Dre)	Ricardo Thomas; Joiner	Rick Rock	3:55
3.	"Multiply" (featuring Nate Dogg)	Joiner; Denaun Porter	Mr. Porter	4:08
4.	"Break Yourself"	Thomas; Joiner; John Austin	Rick Rock	3:11
5.	"Heart of Man"	David Drew; Joiner; Saundralin Green; David Paich; Jeff Porcaro	Jelly Roll	4:08
6.	"Harder" (featuring the Golden State Project)	Drew; Joiner; Reggie Gibson; Austin; Green	Jelly Roll	4:10
7.	"Paul" (Interlude) (performed by Paul Rosenberg)			0:27
8.	"Choke Me, Spank Me (Pull My Hair)"	Joiner; Andre Young; Mike Elizondo	Dr. Dre	3:28
9.	"Losin' Your Mind" (featuring Snoop Dogg)	Young; Joiner; Ron Feemster; Elizondo	Dr. Dre	4:16
10.	"BK to LA" (featuring M.O.P.)	Eric Murray; Jamal Grinnage; Joiner; Tyrone Fyffe; Abrahim Mustafa	Ty Fyffe; Tydro^{[a]}	4:57
11.	"My Name" (featuring Eminem and Nate Dogg)	Marshall Mathers; Luis Resto; Joiner; Nathaniel Hale	Eminem; Luis Resto^{[b]}	4:32
12.	"The Gambler" (featuring Anthony Hamilton)	Roosevelt Harrell; Joiner; Anthony Hamilton	Bink!	4:55
13.	"Missin' U" (featuring Andre "Dre Boogie" Wilson)	Thomas; Joiner; Andre Wilson	Rick Rock	5:22
14.	"Right On"	Erick Sermon; Joiner	Erick Sermon	3:29
15.	"Bitch Ass Niggas" (Interlude) (featuring Eddie Griffin)			1:43
16.	"Enemies"	Jeremy Jackson; Joiner	J-Beats	5:00

Disc 2 (Bonus edition only)
No.	Title	Writer(s)	Producer(s)	Length
17.	"My Life, My World"	Harrell; Joiner; Traci Nelson	Bink!	3:49
18.	"What a Mess"	Chris Martin; Joiner	DJ Premier	3:32
19.	"(Hit U) Where It Hurts"	Stinson; Joiner	Rockwilder	2:59
20.	"Multiply (Remix)" (featuring Busta Rhymes)	Joiner; Trevor Smith; Justin Smith	Just Blaze	4:03

Notes

- ^{^[a]} signifies a co-producer
- ^{^[b]} signifies an additional producer

Sample credits

- "Heart of Man" contains an interpolation of "Africa", written by David Paich and Jeff Porcaro.

== Singles ==
"My Name"

Chart	Position
Hot R&B/Hip-Hop Singles & Tracks	# 66

"Multiply"

Chart	Position
Bubbling Under Hot 100 Singles	# 14
Hot R&B/Hip-Hop Singles & Tracks	# 40
Hot Rap Tracks	# 23
Rhythmic Top 40	# 27

"Symphony In X Major"

Chart	Position
Hot R&B/Hip-Hop Singles & Tracks	# 63

"Choke Me Spank Me (Pull My Hair)"

Chart	Position
Hot R&B/Hip-Hop Singles & Tracks	# 73

== Charts ==
=== Weekly charts ===
Weekly chart performance for Man vs. Machine
Chart (2002)	Peak position
Australian Albums (ARIA)	8
Australian Urban Albums (ARIA)	3
Belgian Albums (Ultratop Flanders)	15
Belgian Albums (Ultratop Wallonia)	15
Canadian Albums (Billboard)	8
Canadian R&B Albums (Nielsen SoundScan)	2
Danish Albums (Hitlisten)	33
Dutch Albums (Album Top 100)	37
Finnish Albums (Suomen virallinen lista)	36
French Albums (SNEP)	12
German Albums (Offizielle Top 100)	20
Irish Albums (IRMA)	56
New Zealand Albums (RMNZ)	36
Norwegian Albums (VG-lista)	35
Scottish Albums (Official Charts)	57
Swedish Albums (Sverigetopplistan)	28
Swiss Albums (Schweizer Hitparade)	33
UK Albums (Official Charts)	43
UK R&B Albums (Official Charts)	7
US Billboard 200	3
US Top R&B/Hip-Hop Albums (Billboard)	1

=== Year-end charts ===
Year-end chart performance for Man vs. Machine
Chart (2002)	Position
Canadian Albums (Nielsen SoundScan)	194
Canadian R&B Albums (Nielsen SoundScan)	34
Canadian Rap Albums (Nielsen SoundScan)	18
US Billboard 200	193
US Top R&B/Hip-Hop Albums (Billboard)	70

== Certifications ==
Certifications for Man vs. Machine
Region	Certification	Certified units/sales
Australia (ARIA)	Gold	35,000^{^}
Canada (Music Canada)	Gold	50,000^{^}
United Kingdom (BPI)	Silver	60,000^{‡}
United States (RIAA)	Gold	500,000^{^}
^{^} Shipments figures based on certification alone.^{‡} Sales+streaming figures based on certification alone.
