= Geographic Locator Codes =

Codes that federal agencies use designating geographic locations in computer programs

Worldwide Geographic Location Codes (GLCs) list the number and letter codes federal agencies should use in designating geographic locations anywhere in the United States or abroad in computer programs. Use of standard codes facilitates the interchange of machine-readable data from agency to agency within the federal community and between federal offices and state and local groups. These codes are also used by some companies as a coding standard as well, especially those that must deal with federal, state and local governments for such things as taxes. The GLCs are administered by the U.S. General Services Administration (GSA).
