= Government Law College =

Government Law College may refer to several institutions in India:

== Karnataka ==
- Government Law College, Bangalore

== Kerala ==
- Government Law College, Calicut
- Government Law College, Ernakulam
- Government Law College, Thiruvananthapuram
- Government Law College, Thrissur

== Maharashtra ==
- Government Law College, Mumbai

== Tamil Nadu ==
- Dr. Ambedkar Government Law College, Chennai
- Government Law College, Chengalpattu
- Government Law College, Madurai
- Government Law College, Vellore
