= Likwidation =

Studio album by Tha Alkaholiks
- Released: August 26, 1997
- Recorded: 1996–97
- Studios: Enterprise (Burbank, California); Yo Mama's House (Los Angeles); Sound Castle (Los Angeles)
- Genre: Hip-hop
- Length: 1:12:50
- Label: Loud Records
- Producers: J-Ro (exec.); Tash (exec.); E-Swift (also exec.); Madlib; Easy Mo Bee; T-Smoov; Marley Marl (co.)

Tha Alkaholiks chronology
Coast II Coast (1995)	Likwidation (1997)	X.O. Experience (2001)

Singles from Likwidation
- 1. "Hip Hop Drunkies" Released: April 10, 1997; 2. "Likwidation" Released: August 26, 1997

Professional ratings
Review scores
Source	Rating
AllMusic	4/5 stars
The New Rolling Stone Album Guide	3.5/5 stars
The Source	3.5/5 stars

Likwidation is the third studio album by American hip-hop group Tha Alkaholiks. It was released on August 26, 1997, via Loud Records. Recording sessions took place at Enterprise Studio in Burbank, California, at Yo Mama's House and at Sound Castle Recording Studios in Los Angeles. Production was primarily handled by member E-Swift, as well as Madlib, Easy Mo Bee, T-Smoov, and Marley Marl. It features guest appearances from Xzibit, Keith Murray, King Tee, Lootpack, Ol' Dirty Bastard, Phil da Agony, The WhoRidas, with cameos from DeBarge, LL Cool J and Nas. The album peaked at number 57 on the Billboard 200 and number 15 on Top R&B Albums chart. Its lead single, "Hip Hop Drunkies", became the group's biggest hit in 1997, peaking at No. 66 on the Billboard Hot 100 chart.

Following the release of Likwidation, group member Tash temporarily went solo, and released the album Rap Life in 1999. The group didn't return with another album until 2001, with the release of X.O. Experience under 'Tha Liks'.

== Track listing ==
No.	Title	Writer(s)	Producer(s)	Length
1.	"AA Meeting" (Intro)			1:36
2.	"Likwidation"	James Robinson; Rico Smith; Eric Brooks; Osten Harvey	Easy Mo Bee	5:08
3.	"Captain Hook"	Robinson; R. Smith; Brooks	E-Swift	4:44
4.	"Nas Skit"	Nasir Jones		0:31
5.	"Tore Down" (featuring Lootpack)	Robinson; R. Smith; Jack Brown; Otis Jackson Jr.	Madlib	4:38
6.	"Off the Wall" (featuring Keith Murray)	Robinson; R. Smith; Keith Murray; T. Smith; Brooks	T-Smoov; E-Swift^{[a]}	4:40
7.	"Killin' It" (featuring Xzibit)	Robinson; R. Smith; Alvin Joiner; Jackson Jr.	Madlib	4:04
8.	"LL Cool J Skit"	James Todd Smith		0:51
9.	"Feel the Real"	Robinson; R. Smith; Brooks	E-Swift	4:36
10.	"Hip Hop Drunkies" (featuring Ol' Dirty Bastard)	Robinson; R. Smith; Russell Jones; Brooks; Marlon Williams	E-Swift; Marley Marl^{[a]}	4:54
11.	"Aww Shit!" (featuring Xzibit)	Robinson; R. Smith; Brooks	E-Swift; Easy Mo Bee^{[a]}	3:53
12.	"J-Ro Late Skit"			0:25
13.	"Keep It Pourin'"	Robinson; Brooks	E-Swift	3:51
14.	"Likwit Ridas" (featuring The WhoRidas)	Robinson; R. Smith; Hasaan Mahmoud; Meikeo Taylor; Brooks	E-Swift	4:44
15.	"Funny Style" (featuring King Tee)	Robinson; Roger McBride; Brooks	E-Swift	2:49
16.	"Commercial Skit"			0:47
17.	"All Night"	Robinson; R. Smith; Brooks; Stevie Wonder	E-Swift	5:44
18.	"DeBarge Skit"	DeBarge		0:37
19.	"Pass Out"	Robinson; R. Smith; Brooks	E-Swift	4:33
20.	"20th Caller Skit"			0:32
21.	"Rockin' With the Best" (featuring Phil da Agony)	Robinson; R. Smith; Jason Smith; Brooks	E-Swift	4:03
22.	"Contents Unda Pressure"	Robinson; R. Smith; Brooks	E-Swift	4:58
Total length:				1:12:50

Notes

- ^{^[a]} signifies a co-producer

Sample credits

- Track 6 contains elements from "The Breaks" written by Kurtis Walker, JB Moore, Robert Ford, Russell Simmons & Lawrence Smith, performed by Kurtis Blow
- Track 11 contains elements from "Love Spell" written by Bill Curtis, performed by the Fatback Band
- Track 15 contains elements from "Don't Tell It" written by Deidra Brown, Deanna Brown and Yamma Brown, performed by James Brown
- Track 17 contains elements from "Too High" written and performed by Stevie Wonder

== Personnel ==
- DJ Romes – scratches (tracks: 5, 15)
- Morris Rentie Jr. – bass (track 6)
- Eric "Bobo" Correa – percussion (track 6)
- James Macon – guitar (track 13)
- Derrick Davis – flute (track 17)
- Eric Brooks – engineering
- Eric Lynch – engineering
- Steve "Fred 40 To The Head" Fredrickson – engineering
- Gabe Chiesa – engineering
- Jean-Marie Horvat – engineering
- Marlon Williams – engineering
- Mark Chalecki – mastering
- Natas Kaupas – art direction, layout
- Philippe McClelland – photography
- Dave McEowen – lacquer cut
- Noa Ochi – A&R direction
- Che Harris – A&R
- Laurie Marks – A&R

== Charts ==
Chart (1997)	Peak position
US Billboard 200	57
US Top R&B Albums (Billboard)	15

=== Singles chart positions ===
Year	Song	Chart positions	
Year	Song	Billboard Hot 100	Hot R&B/Hip-Hop Singles & Tracks
1997	"Hip Hop Drunkies"	66	37
1997	"Likwidation"	122	89
