= Multiply (Xzibit song) =

Single by Xzibit featuring Nate Dogg

Single by Xzibit featuring Nate Dogg

from the album Man vs. Machine
- Released: 2002
- Recorded: 2002
- Genre: Hip hop, West coast hip hop
- Length: 4:08
- Label: Loud
- Songwriters: Alvin Joiner, Nathaniel Hale, Denaun Porter
- Producer: Mr. Porter

Xzibit singles chronology
"Get Your Walk On" (2001)	"Multiply" (2002)	"Choke Me, Spank Me (Pull My Hair)" (2002)

Nate Dogg singles chronology
"I Got Love" (2001)	"Multiply" (2002)	"The Streets" (2002)

Multiply is the first single from Xzibit's album, Man vs. Machine. The chorus is rapped by Nate Dogg. The music video shows Xzibit sitting in different cars driving across Death Valley. An official remix featuring Busta Rhymes was released as a bonus track in the same album. The video contains cameo appearances by Busta Rhymes, Dr. Dre and WC.

== Track listings ==
=== CD single (UK/NZ/FLX879 673 155-2) ===
1. Multiply (explicit) (04:11)
2. Multiply (Clean Radio version) (03:50)
3. Get Your Walk On (feat. WC + Dat Nigga Daz) 05:02
4. Multiply (Video)
5. SukItToMaTeTe (Bonus Track) 03:47

== Charts ==
Chart (2002–2003)	Peak position
Australia (ARIA)	31
Australian Urban (ARIA)	12
Austria (Ö3 Austria Top 40)	66
Belgium (Ultratop 50 Flanders)	47
Belgium (Ultratip Bubbling Under Wallonia)	6
Canada (Nielsen SoundScan)	68
Germany (GfK)	33
Hungary (Single Top 40)	18
Netherlands (Single Top 100)	76
Norway (VG-lista)	15
Scotland Singles (OCC)	52
Sweden (Sverigetopplistan)	31
Switzerland (Schweizer Hitparade)	33
UK Singles (OCC)	39
UK Hip Hop/R&B (OCC)	10
US Bubbling Under Hot 100 (Billboard)	14
US Hot R&B/Hip-Hop Songs (Billboard)	40
US Hot Rap Songs (Billboard)	23
