= X.O. Experience =

Studio album by Tha Liks
- Released: July 10, 2001
- Recorded: 2000–2001
- Studios: Soundcastle (California); The Hit Factory (New York); Skip Saylor Recording (California); Mastersound Studio (Virginia Beach, Virginia); Mirror Image Studios (Dix Hills, New York)
- Genre: Hip-hop
- Length: 57:35
- Labels: Loud; Columbia
- Producers: DJ Scratch; DJ Twinz; E-Swift; Rockwilder; Thayod Ausar; The Neptunes

Tha Liks chronology
Likwidation (1997)	X.O. Experience (2001)	Firewater (2006)

Singles from X.O. Experience
- 1. "Best U Can" Released: May 8, 2001

Professional ratings
Aggregate scores
Source	Rating
Metacritic	65/100
Review scores
Source	Rating
AllMusic	4/5 stars
HipHopDX	4/5
NME	4/5 stars
RapReviews	8/10
(The New) Rolling Stone Album Guide	2.5/5 stars
The Source	4/5 stars

X.O. Experience is the fourth studio album by American hip-hop group Tha Alkaholiks. It was released on July 10, 2001, via Loud Records. Recording sessions took place at Soundcastle and Skip Saylor Recording in California, at The Hit Factory in New York, at Mastersound Studio in Virginia Beach, and at Mirror Image Studios in Dix Hills. Production was handled by member E-Swift, as well as Rockwilder, DJ Scratch, DJ Twinz, Thayod Ausar and The Neptunes. It features guest appearances from Xzibit, Busta Rhymes, Butch Cassidy, Defari, King Tee, Kurupt and Shae Fiol. The album reached number 47 on the Billboard 200 and number 14 on the Top R&B/Hip-Hop Albums chart in the United States. Its lead single "Best U Can" became a minor hit in 2001, peaking at No. 64 on the Billboard Hot R&B/Hip-Hop Songs chart and No. 14 on the Hot Rap Songs chart. The album's cover art is an homage to The Jimi Hendrix Experience's 1967 album Are You Experienced.

== Track listing ==
No.	Title	Writer(s)	Producer(s)	Length
1.	"Intro"			0:41
2.	"Bar Code" (featuring Xzibit)	Rico Smith; James Robinson; Alvin Joiner; Eric Brooks	E-Swift	3:32
3.	"Run Wild" (featuring Shae Fiol)	R. Smith; J. Robinson; Dana Stinson	Rockwilder	3:51
4.	"L-I-K-S"	R. Smith; Brooks; J. Robinson	E-Swift	3:20
5.	"Bully Foot (Skit)"			0:41
6.	"Bully Foot" (featuring Busta Rhymes)	Trevor Smith; J. Robinson; R. Smith; George Spivey	DJ Scratch	4:08
7.	"My Dear" (featuring Defari)	R. Smith; Duane A. Johnson; J. Robinson; Brooks; Romye Robinson; Trevant Hardson; Emandu Wilcox; Derrick Stewart; Juan Martinez; John Sebastian; Mark Sebastian; Steve Boone	E-Swift	3:53
8.	"Interlude"			0:17
9.	"Da Da Da Da"	R. Smith; J. Robinson; Brooks; Eric James Banks	Thayod Ausar	4:54
10.	"40 Oz. Quartet, Pt. 1"	J. Robinson; Brooks	E-Swift	1:48
11.	"Sickness" (featuring Butch Cassidy)	R. Smith; J. Robinson; Danny Means; Stinson	Rockwilder	3:58
12.	"Goin' Crazy"	J. Robinson; R. Smith; Brooks	E-Swift	4:30
13.	"Best U Can"	R. Smith; J. Robinson; Pharrell Williams; Chad Hugo; Brooks	The Neptunes	3:37
14.	"40 Oz. Quartet, Pt. 2"	J. Robinson; Brooks	E-Swift	1:31
15.	"Anotha Round"	J. Robinson; R. Smith; Brooks	E-Swift	4:11
16.	"Yo Mouth (Skit)"			0:33
17.	"The Bubble" (featuring King Tee)	Brooks; R. Smith; Roger McBride	E-Swift	4:12
18.	"151" (featuring Xzibit)	R. Smith; J. Robinson; Joiner; Raymond Grant; Richard Grant	DJ Twinz	3:43
19.	"Promote Violins" (featuring Kurupt)	Ricardo Brown; J. Robinson; R. Smith; Brooks	E-Swift	4:15
Total length:				57:35

== Personnel ==
- Rico "Tash" Smith – vocals, executive producer, A&R
- James "J-Ro" Robinson – vocals, executive producer, A&R
- Eric "E-Swift" Brooks – vocals, producer (tracks: 2, 4, 7, 10, 12, 14, 15, 17, 19), executive producer, A&R
- Alvin "Xzibit" Joiner – vocals (tracks: 2, 18)
- Shae Geever – vocals (track 3)
- Olan "Mr. Tan" Thompson – backing vocals (track 4)
- Trevor "Busta Rhymes" Smith – vocals (track 6)
- Duane "Defari" Johnson – vocals (track 7)
- Danny "Butch Cassidy" Means – vocals (track 11)
- Stanley "Stan The Guitar Man" Jones – guitar (track 15)
- Roger "King Tee" McBride – vocals (track 17)
- Kurt "DJ Revolution" Hoffman – scratches (track 17)
- Ricardo "Kurupt" Brown – vocals (track 19)
- Dana "Rockwilder" Stinson – producer (tracks: 3, 11)
- George "DJ Scratch" Spivey – producer (track 6)
- Eric "Thayod Ausar" Banks – producer (track 9)
- Pharrell Williams – producer (track 13)
- Chad Hugo – producer (track 13)
- Raymond Grant – producer (track 18)
- Richard Grant – producer (track 18)
- Danny Romero – recording (tracks: 2, 4, 7, 10–12, 19), mixing (track 2)
- Eric "Skip" Saylor – recording (tracks: 2, 4, 19)
- Lance Pierre – recording (tracks: 3, 7, 9, 17)
- Brian Stanley – recording (track 6)
- Dave Hummel – recording (track 13)
- Troy Hightower – recording (track 18), mixing (tracks: 3, 11)
- Doug Wilson – mixing (tracks: 4, 6, 7, 9, 10, 12, 15, 17–19)
- Ken "Duro" Ifill – mixing (track 13)
- Jason Clark – art direction, design, layout
- David Bett – art direction
- Daniel Hastings – photography
- Shane Mooney – A&R
- Trakelle Frazier – A&R
- Racquel Boothe – A&R
- Michael Cirelli – A&R
- Lynn Nantana – management
- Mike "Boogie" Robertson – management
- Liz Hausle – product management
- William Berrol – legal
- Anthony Andrews – tour/road management

== Charts ==
Chart (2001)	Peak position
US Billboard 200	47
US Top R&B/Hip-Hop Albums (Billboard)	14
