= 21 & Over (album) =

Studio album by Tha Alkaholiks
- Released: August 24, 1993
- Recorded: 1992–93
- Studios: Yo Mama's House (Los Angeles, CA)
- Genre: Hip-hop
- Length: 35:15
- Labels: Loud; RCA
- Producers: Derrick Williams; King Tee; Lootpack; Tha Alkaholiks

Tha Alkaholiks chronology
| 21 & Over (1993) | Coast II Coast (1995) |

Singles from 21 & Over
- 1. "Make Room" Released: June 21, 1993; 2. "Likwit" Released: 1994; 3. "Mary Jane" Released: June 6, 1994

21 & Over is the debut studio album by American hip-hop trio tha Alkaholiks. It was released on August 24, 1993, via Loud/RCA Records. The recording sessions took place at Yo Mama's House, in Los Angeles. The album was produced by Lootpack, King Tee, Derrick "D. Pimp" Williams, and tha Alkaholiks, who also served as executive producers with Fabian Duvernay. It features guest appearances from King Tee, Field Trip, Lootpack, and Threat. The album peaked at number 124 on the Billboard 200 and number 23 on the Top R&B/Hip-Hop Albums in the United States.

The album has ten tracks, timed at only about 35 minutes, but it contains three singles, "Make Room", "Likwit" and "Mary Jane". None of these singles reached the Billboard Hot 100, but they all did well on the Hot Dance Music/Maxi-Singles Sales chart. The only single that contains vocals from anybody other than Tash and J-Ro is "Likwit", which features King Tee. King Tee is responsible for founding tha Alkaholiks, and the track's title is a reference to the Likwit Crew that he created. Lootpack and Threat are the only other guest vocalists. Nu metal versions of 2 of their songs are on Loud Rocks, one with Crazy Town covered "Only When I'm Drunk" also on Crazy Town's 1999 album The Gift of Game, and "Make Room" featuring Sugar Ray.

== Critical reception ==
Professional ratings
Review scores
| Source | Rating |
|---|---|
| AllMusic | 4/5 stars |
| The New Rolling Stone Album Guide | 4/5 stars |
| The Source | 4/5 stars |

The album is highly praised, and has been described as "the quintessential West Coast party album". Trouser Press wrote: "Part of the '90s West Coast revival of old-school rap sensibilities, San Fernando Valley's Alkaholiks take the 'party-and-bullshit' theme to its inevitable falling-down-drunk-and-hurling end."

== Track listing ==
All tracks are written by Rico Smith, James Robinson and Eric Brooks, except where noted.

21 & Over
| No. | Title | Writer(s) | Producer(s) | Length |
|---|---|---|---|---|
| 1. | "Likwit" (featuring King Tee) | Smith; Robinson; Brooks; Roger McBride | E-Swift; Tha Alkaholiks^{[a]} | 3:27 |
| 2. | "Only When I'm Drunk" | | E-Swift; Tha Alkaholiks^{[a]} | 3:37 |
| 3. | "Last Call" | | E-Swift; King Tee^{[a]} | 4:36 |
| 4. | "Can't Tell Me Shit" | | Derick "D. Pimp" Williams; E-Swift^{[a]} | 4:03 |
| 5. | "Turn Tha Party Out" (featuring Lootpack) | | Lootpack; Tha Alkaholiks^{[a]} | 3:22 |
| 6. | "Bullshit" (featuring King Tee) | Smith; Robinson; Brooks; McBride | King Tee; E-Swift; Tha Alkaholiks^{[a]} | 3:29 |
| 7. | "Soda Pop" (featuring Field Trip) | | E-Swift; King Tee^{[b]} | 2:48 |
| 8. | "Make Room" | | E-Swift; Tha Alkaholiks^{[a]} | 3:28 |
| 9. | "Mary Jane" | | Lootpack; Tha Alkaholiks^{[a]} | 3:30 |
| 10. | "Who Dem Niggas" (featuring Threat) | Smith; Robinson; Brooks; Corey Lloyd Brown | E-Swift; Tha Alkaholiks^{[a]} | 3:45 |
| Total length: | | | | 35:15 |

Notes

- ^{^[a]} signifies a co-producer
- ^{^[b]} signifies an additional producer

== Personnel ==
- Rico "Tash" Smith – vocals, co-producer (track 1, 2, 5, 8–10), mixing, executive producer
- James "J-Ro" Robinson – vocals, co-producer (track 1, 2, 5, 8–10), mixing, executive producer
- Eric "E-Swift" Brooks – vocals, producer (tracks: 1–3, 6–8, 10), co-producer (tracks: 4, 5, 9), mixing, executive producer
- Roger "King Tee" McBride – vocals (tracks: 1, 6), producer (track 6), co-producer (tracks: 3), additional producer (track 7), concept
- The Loot Pack – vocals (track 5), producers (tracks: 5, 9)
- Field Trip – vocals (track 7)
- Corey "Threat" Brown – vocals (track 10)
- Derrick "D. Pimp" Williams – producer (track 4)
- Steve "Fred 40 to the Head" Fredrickson – engineering
- Bob Morse – mixing
- Fabian Duvernay – executive producer
- Mark Heimback-Nielsen – art direction, design
- Michael Miller – photography
- Trevor Williams – A&R

== Charts ==
| Chart (1993) | Peak position |
|---|---|
| US Billboard 200 | 124 |
| US Top R&B/Hip-Hop Albums (Billboard) | 23 |

=== Singles ===
| Year | Song | Chart positions | | | |
| Year | Song | US Hot 100 | US R&B | US Rap | US Dance Maxi-Singles |
|---|---|---|---|---|---|
| 1993 | "Make Room" | – | 85 | 8 | 43 |
| 1994 | "Likwit" | – | 97 | 31 | 38 |
| 1994 | "Mary Jane" | – | – | – | 22 |
