= Coast II Coast =

Studio album by Tha Alkaholiks
- Released: February 28, 1995
- Recorded: 1994
- Studios: Yo Mama's House (Los Angeles, CA)
- Genre: Hip-hop
- Length: 51:44
- Labels: Loud; RCA
- Producers: Tha Alkaholiks (also exec.); Diamond D; Madlib

Tha Alkaholiks chronology
21 & Over (1993)	Coast II Coast (1995)	Likwidation (1997)

Singles from Coast II Coast
- 1. "Daaam!" Released: 1994; 2. "Next Level" Released: 1995

Professional ratings
Review scores
Source	Rating
AllMusic	4/5 stars
The New Rolling Stone Album Guide	3.5/5 stars
Rap Pages	7/10
RapReviews	10/10
The Source	3.5/5 stars

Coast II Coast is the second studio album by American hip-hop trio Tha Alkaholiks. It was released on February 28, 1995, via Loud Records. Recording sessions took place at Yo Mama's House in Los Angeles. Production was handled by Diamond D, Madlib, and Tha Liks themselves. It features guest appearances from King Tee, Declaime, Diamond D, Lootpack, Q-Tip, The Baby Bubbas and Xzibit. The album reached number 50 on the Billboard 200 and number 12 on the Top R&B/Hip-Hop Albums in the United States. Its lead single "Daaam!" peaked at No. 85 on the Hot R&B/Hip-Hop Singles & Tracks and No. 20 on the Hot Rap Singles, while the second single off of the album, "Next Level", landed at No. 43 on the Hot Rap Singles.

== Critical reception ==
Jeff Chang, in Trouser Press, praised E-Swift's production, calling it "as incisive as ever".

== Track listing ==
All tracks are written by Rico Smith, James Robinson and Eric Brooks, and produced by E-Swift, except where noted.

No.	Title	Writer(s)	Producer(s)	Length
1.	"WLIX" (featuring Lootpack and Declaime)	Smith; Robinson; Brooks; Otis Jackson; Jack Brown; Dudley Perkins	Madlib; Tha Alkaholiks^{[a]}	5:53
2.	"Read My Lips"			3:20
3.	"Let It Out"	Smith; Robinson; Brooks; Joseph Kirkland	Diamond D	4:43
4.	"21 and Under"			4:48
5.	"All the Way Live" (featuring King Tee and Q-Tip)	Smith; Robinson; Roger McBride; Jonathan Davis		4:22
6.	"Hit and Run" (featuring Xzibit)			5:46
7.	"DAAAM!"			4:46
8.	"2014"			3:13
9.	"Bottoms up" (featuring King Tee)	Smith; Robinson; Brooks; McBride		4:06
10.	"Flashback" (featuring The Baby Bubbas)			6:02
11.	"The Next Level" (featuring Diamond D)	Smith; Robinson; Brooks; Kirkland	Diamond D; E-Swift^{[b]}	4:44
Total length:				51:44

Notes

- ^{^[a]} signifies a co-producer
- ^{^[b]} signifies an additional producer

== Personnel ==
- Rico "Tash" Smith – vocals, co-producer (track 1), executive producer
- James "J-Ro" Robinson – vocals, co-producer (track 1), executive producer
- Eric "E-Swift" Brooks – scratches, vocals, producer (tracks: 2, 4–10), co-producer (tracks: 1, 11), mixing, executive producer
- Dudley "Declaime" Perkins – vocals (track 1)
- Jack "Wildchild" Brown – vocals (track 1)
- Romeo "DJ Romes" Jimenez – scratches (track 1)
- Otis "Madlib" Jackson – producer (track 1)
- Joseph "Diamond D" Kirkland – vocals (track 11), producer (tracks: 2, 11)
- James E. "DJ Pen One" Haynes – scratches (track 2)
- Roger "King Tee" McBride – vocals (tracks: 5, 9)
- Jonathan "Q-Tip" Davis – vocals (track 5)
- Alvin "Xzibit" Joiner – vocals (track 6)
- Les July – bass (track 7)
- The Baby Bubbas – vocals (track 10)
- Roman "Lil Ro" Hernandez – additional vocals (track 11)
- Steve "Fred 40 To The Head" Fredrickson – engineering
- Axel Nehaus – engineering (track 5)
- Bob Morse – mixing
- Noa Ochi – coordinator
- Natas Kaupas – art direction, design
- Michael Miller – photography
- Troy McNair – management

== Charts ==
Chart (1995)	Peak position
US Billboard 200	50
US Top R&B/Hip-Hop Albums (Billboard)	12
