= Tash (rapper) =

American rapper

- Also known as: Catashtraphe
- Born: Rico Smith; Columbus, Ohio, U.S.
- Origin: Los Angeles, California, U.S.
- Genre: Hip hop
- Occupation: Rapper
- Years active: 1993–present
- Label: Amalgam Digital
- Member of: Tha Alkaholiks; Likwit Crew

Rico Smith (born August 9, 1971), better known by his stage name Tash, is an American rapper. He is most known for his work as a member of the West Coast hip hop group, Tha Alkaholiks alongside J-Ro and E-Swift. Tash has released two solo albums, Rap Life (1999) and Control Freek (2009), and worked on five albums with Tha Alkaholiks.

== History ==
=== Early life and career ===
Tash was born in Columbus, Ohio, but moved to Los Angeles, California at age 16 with his four brothers and mother. His parents divorced the following year, but Tash decided to stay in California and pursue a career as a rapper. In California, he co-founded Tha Alkaholiks—originally known as Everyday Street Poets (ESP), later known as Tha Liks—with fellow Ohio native, DJ E-Swift and a Californian emcee named J-Ro. Tash had previously worked in a group named Disturbers of the Peace with E-Swift and even lived with him, while they each performed music locally. J-Ro had worked with Californian hip-hop artists such as Suavee D and King Tee, but never with Tash or E-Swift. Tash's connection with J-Ro allowed Tha Alkaholiks to appear on King Tee's 1993 album, Tha Triflin' Album. Soon after their appearance, Tha Alkaholiks started touring with famed hip hop artists such as Ice Cube, and even inked a record deal with Loud/RCA. After appearing on more songs with Tha Alkaholiks in collaboration with other artists, his party-themed rhymes created much anticipation for his group's debut album, 21 & Over.

=== Tha Alkaholiks work ===
The first album by Tha Alkaholiks, 1993's 21 & Over, lead critics to applaud Tash's "punch lines and comic timing," "killer delivery of topnotch MCs" and "more than enough talent and energy to back up [...] endlessly clever boasting." The album as a whole was a great critical success but was not too commercially successful. It did have three charting singles though and likely gained Tash and his group a "sizeable cult following." 1995 saw the release of Coast II Coast which was also a critical success, but had slightly more commercial success than its predecessor. It spawned two minor hit singles in "DAAAM!" and "The Next Level." Tha Alkaholiks changed their name to Tha Liks for their 1997 album, Likwidation. It was met with decent critical reception and about the same commercial reception as Coast II Coast. It did boast a Billboard Hot 100 hit with "Hip Hop Drunkies" featuring Ol' Dirty Bastard, which is their most successful recording of all time. Tash and his group went on to release X.O. Experience in 2001 and Firewater in 2006, before disbanding as a group. The large amount of time in between releases allowed each member of Tha Liks to work on solo projects.

=== Solo work ===
Tash released one album, Rap Life, on Loud Records in 1999. It received some critical acclaim and little commercial. It only reached #148 on The Billboard 200, even with guest appearances by famed artists such as Outkast and Kurupt. It did reach #1 on the Top Heatseekers chart which tracks underground acclaim, and it had two singles that reached the Hot Rap Singles chart. Those two songs, "Rap Life" featuring Raekwon and "Bermuda Triangle," remain as Tash's best-known solo tracks.

According to a 2009 interview, Tha Alkalholiks are done releasing albums, and Tash was 100% finished with his next solo album, Control Freek on the Amalgam Digital label. The album was released in June 2009. It featured appearances from B-real, J-ro and King Tee and production by will.i.am, Maestro, and J. Wells.

In a 2015 interview with Dubcnn, Tash revealed that he will be releasing a new album titled "Publicity Stunt". "Publicity Stunt", according to Tash is "a collaboration album where in the last 15 years, I just did so many songs with people." The album was released on July 14 2015.

Tha Alkaholics Guest Appearances
Song	Artists	Year
"Got It Bad Y'All"	King Tee	1993
"Bust Dat Ass"	King Tee	1993
"Excuse Me As I Rip It"	Sweet n Lo	1993
"Baddie Bye"	Mad Cap	1993
"All Barf No Bite"	Kokane	1994
"Coast II Coast"	Alks	1995
"No Hand Outs"	Snagglepuss, Xzibit, Phil da Agony	1995
"Free Style Ghetto"	King Tee, Xzibit	1995
"International Anthem"	DJ Honda	1996
"Prime Time"	Funkmaster Flex, Xzibit	1998
"Let It Rain"	King Tee, Xzibit	1998
"Likwit Connection"	Defari, Xzibit	1998
"Likwit Fusion"	Lootpack, Defari	1999
"Make Room"	Sugar Ray	2000
"Only When I'm Drunk"	Crazy Town	2000
"My Writes"	De La Soul, Xzibit	2000
"Alkaholics"	Xzibit, Erick Sermon	2000
"Right On"	Dilated Peoples	2000
"Heavy Rotation"	Dilated Peoples	2001
"Have Fun"	Kurupt	2001
"The Come Off"	Wildchild	2003

Album information
Rap Life
- Released: November 2, 1999
- Billboard 200 chart position: #148
- R&B/Hip-Hop chart position: #28
- Singles: "Rap Life", "Bermuda Triangle". "G's Iz G's"
Control Freek
- Released: June 30, 2009
- Billboard 200 chart position: -
- R&B/Hip-Hop chart position: -
- Singles: -
Publicity Stunt
- Released: July 14, 2015
