= Tha Alkaholiks =

American hip-hop trio

- Also known as: Tha Liks
- Origin: Los Angeles, California, U.S.
- Genre: Hip-hop
- Years active: 1991–2006, 2011–present
- Labels: Loud, Waxploitation
- Spinoffs: Likwit Crew
- Members: Tash; J-Ro; E-Swift

Tha Alkaholiks, also known as Tha Liks, is an American hip-hop trio from Los Angeles. Since the early 1990s they have produced party music with a hardcore hip-hop edge, powered by the beats and rhymes of DJ, producer and rapper E-Swift (he was born Eric Brooks in Columbus, Georgia and grew up in Toledo, Ohio) and the rhymes of J-Ro (born James Robinson in Los Angeles) and Tash (born Rico Smith in Columbus, Ohio).

Though commercial crossover success largely eluded the group, they maintained a dedicated following on the West Coast, throughout the United States, and worldwide. Three songs of Tha Alkaholiks were featured on Loud Rocks, a compilation album.

== Discography ==
=== Studio albums ===
- 21 & Over (1993)
- Coast II Coast (1995)
- Likwidation (1997)
- X.O. Experience (2001)
- Firewater (2006)
- Daaam! (2025)

=== Singles ===
List of singles, with selected chart positions, showing year released and album name
Title	Year	Peak chart positions				Album
Title	Year	US	US Dance Sales	US R&B	US Rap	Album
"Make Room"	1993	—	43	85	8	21 & Over
"Likwit"	1994	—	38	97	31	21 & Over
"Daam"	1995	—	41	85	20	Coast II Coast
"The Next Level"	1995	—	23	—	43	Coast II Coast
"Hip Hop Drunkies" (featuring Ol' Dirty Bastard)	1997	66	3	37	6	Likwidation
"Likwidation"	1997	—	—	89	—	Likwidation
"Best U Can"	2001	—	—	64	14	X.O. Experience
"—" denotes a recording that did not chart or was not released in that territory.

E-Swift production
Year	Artist	Song
1993	King Tee, Alkaholics	"Got It Bad Y'all"
1993	Sweet n Low	"I Got Skills"; "Excuse Me As I Rip It"
1995	Alkaholics	"Coast II Coast"
1995	Alkaholics	"No Hand Outs" {One Million Strong compilation}
1995	King Just	"Shaolin Soldiers"; "Pain"
1996	Xzibit	"Eyes May Shine"; "Plastic Surgery"; "Just Maintain"
1996	DJ Honda, Alkaholics	"International Anthem" {co-produced with Honda}
1996	Heltah Skeltah	"Operation Lockdown"
1996	O.G.C.	"Flapping" {co-produced with Madlib}
1998	Everlast	"Praise the Lord"
1998	Xzibit, Alkaholics, King Tee	"Let It Rain"
1999	Defari	"Lowlands Anthem Pt. 1"; "Likwit Connection"; "Yes Indeed"; "For the DJs (Please Juggle Me)"
1999	Scritti & Likwits	"Another Sound Mission (Mystic Handyman Part 2) [E-Swift Mystical Mix)"
1999	Tash	1, 11, 12, 15-18 {from Rap Life}
2000	Kottonmouth Kings	"The Lottery (E-Swift Remix)"
2000	Barbershop MCs, Xzibit	"New Era"
2000	Everlast	"Life's a Bitch"
2000	Dilated Peoples, Alkaholics	"Right On"
2001	Kurupt, Alkaholics	"Have Fun"
2002	Snoop Dogg	"Da Boss Would Like 2 See U"
2003	Casual	"Feel da Agony"

Tash guest appearances
Song	Year	Artist
"Check It Out"	1993	Mad Kap, King T
"Bird's Eye View"	1996	Xzibit
"Body Rock"	1998	Mos Def, Q-Tip
"Soundbombing"	1999	Dilated Peoples
"Thunder & Lightening"	1999	Defari, Xzibit
"The 7th"	1999	Ice-T, Ras Kass
"Last Call"	2000	Somethin' for the People
"Likwit Rhyming"	2000	Tony Touch, Xzibit, Defari
"Srv1"	2000	Spontaneous
"Movin' On (Remix)"	2002	Moonpont
"Xtra Thump"	2003	Defari
"I' Ready (But You Ain't)"	2003	Will.i.am

== Videography ==
- Beer Goggles (2006)
