= Blue Sky Black Death discography =

- Studio albums: 4
- EPs: 1
- Singles: 2

Blue Sky Black Death (abbreviated BSBD) is a production duo based in Seattle, Washington. It consists of Kingston Maguire, better known mononymously as Kingston, and Ian Taggart, better known by his stage name Young God. They are known principally for their hip hop and instrumental music, made with a mixture of live instrumentation and sampling.

== Discography ==
=== Studio albums ===
Year	Title	Notes
2006	A Heap of Broken Images: Released: May 23, 2006; Format: CD, LP; Label: Mush Records (MH-243)	Debut release
2008	Late Night Cinema: Released: April 29, 2008; Format: CD, LP, download; Label: Babygrande Records (BBG-CD-353) [CD] (BBG-LP-1062) [LP]	
2011	Noir: Released: April 26, 2011; Format: CD, download; Label: Fake Four Inc. (FFINC025)	
2013	Glaciers: Released: October 1, 2013; Format: CD, download; Label: Fake Four Inc. (FFINC048)	

Collaboration albums

- The Holocaust (2006) (with Warcloud)
- Razah's Ladder (2007) (with Hell Razah)
- The Evil Jeanius (2008) (with Jean Grae)
- Slow Burning Lights (2008) (with Yes Alexander)
- Third Party (2010) (with Alexander Chen)
- For the Glory (2011) (with Nacho Picasso)
- Lord of the Fly (2012) (with Nacho Picasso)
- Exalted (2012) (with Nacho Picasso)
- Skull & Bones (2012) (with Bolo Nef & Caz Greez)
- Blue Sky Black Death & Key Nyata (2013) (with Key Nyata)
- Razah's Ladder 2 (TBA) (with Hell Razah)

EPs

- Cliff of Death EP (2012) (with Deniro Farrar)

Compilations

- The Indie Rock Essentials (2009)

Singles

- "The Ocean / No Image" (2006)
- "Rebel to the Grain / Slapbox with Jesus" (2008)

Mixes/Podcasts/Other

- Dirtnap Mixtape (2007)
- 07/10/15 URB.com (2007) exclusive Podcast
- Gifts in Jail, Vol. 1 (2008)
- Gifts in Jail, Vol. 2 (2008)
- Lean Night Cinema (2008) Late Night Cinema screwed
- Recession Proof (2009)
- J(A)Y(Z) (2009)
- Lost and Unreleased (2009)
- Noir + Violet (2011) Noir screwed
- 13 (2012)
- Aquatic Reverie (2012)
- Euphoric Tape (2013)
- Euphoric Tape II (2013)
- Glaciers (2014) screwed
- Euphoric Tape III (2014)

=== Production credits ===
Kingston (aka Orphan, 88 Ultra)

- Noah23 - numerous unspecified tracks on Plague Language (aka Cytoplasm Pixel) (1999)
- Noah23 - "Mercury Retrograde", "Insect Network", "Spiral Knuckle", "Tapeworm", "Nemesis", "Psychic Biters", "Qualude", "Avoid", "Harvest", "Kali Yantra", "Frequency" & "Hemoglobin" on Neophyte Phenotype (2001)
- The Twin Sisters - "Mugshot" on Amulet (2002)
- Mindbender - "Class of Immortals" on Fantasyland Before Time (2002)
- Noah23 - "Volapuk", "Crypto Sporidian", "Learning Curve", "Hourglass", "Banded Hairstreak", "Nocturnal", "Imhotep" & "Julia Set" on Quicksand (2002)
- Baracuda - "Tetragammoth", "Deadly Rays", "Ice Age", "Royal City Chainsaw Massacre", "Unpardonable Sins", "Dental Plan", "Mulberry Skies", "Rain Buckets", "Duplicate Version" & "Regime" on Tetragammoth (2002)
- Noah23 - "Deep Space Machinery" on Tau Ceti (2003)
- Orko the Sykotik Alien - all tracks except "Wack as Fuck" on Atoms of Eden (2003)
- Offwhyte - "People Music" on Submerged State 2G4 Tour CD (2004)
- Noah23 - "Silicate Magma Chamber", "Orange Dolphin", "Twist of Fate", "Data Hooks" & "Trilateral Damage" on Mitochondrial Blues (2004)
- Noah23 - "Digitaria Desert Search", "Bitesized Rat Race", "Fuzzy Logic", "Lemon Fever Helmet", "Blast Off", "Sunset Crater", "Viper Centipede Blizzard" & "Orphaned Ad" on Sigma Octantis (2004)
- John Tsunam - "Feet Not Feat" on Not Too Intelligent But Extremely Resourceful (2004)
- The Train Rawbers - "Infinite Infinite", "Ninjah Pizza", "Blueberry Soup" & "Big Baby Taurus" on The Train Rawbers (2004)
- Ceschi - "Bad Love Poem", "Heaven" & "Roaches" on Fake Flowers (2004)
- Plague Language - "Leave", "Skin Deeper", "Angel by Aging", "Bad Both Ways", "The Cessation of Samsara", "Precious" & "Again" on Farewell Archetypes (2004)
- Plague Language - "Bad Both Ways", "Find Yourself", "Again" & "I Alone (Remix)" on Farewell Archetypes Vol. 2 (2004)
- Noah23 - "Lizard Lion Eagle", "As Below So Above", "Chicken Pox", "Godhead Omelet", "Freelance Zenarchist", "Scream", "Quicksilver", "Nova Toast" & "Marshes" on Jupiter Sajitarius (2004)
- Noah23 - "Chicken Soup" on "Chicken Pox" (2004)
- Jus Allah - "Vengeance" & "Drill Sergeant" (2004)
- Livestock - "Wolf & Serpent", "Big Bad City", "Prey 2 Machines", "Almond Wine" & "Spiral Like the Nine" on Spiral Like the Nine (2005)
- Ceschi - "In a Coma" on Fake Flowers R.I.P. #1 (2005)
- Orphan - "Jailbreak" on Superiorbelly Compilation (2005)
- Jus Allah - "Supreme (Black God's Remix)" on All Fates Have Changed (2005)
- Demune – "Precious", "A Ceilings Observations", "Triangle" & "Find Yourself" on Crossbreeding and Grafting (2006)
- Famous Playaz - "Viper Centipede Blizzard" on Funny Money (2007)
- Noah23 - "Chicken Soup" on Cameo Therapy (2007)
- StapleMouth - "Angel by Aging", "Trilateral Damage", "Outbreak" & "10 Kings (Mega Tuff)" on Un-Everything Except Three (2009)
- Kingston - "Good Good Feeling" on Phase Five - NZ Music - Disc 11 (2009)

Young God (aka Rev. Left)

- Noah23 - "Revertebrae" on Tau Ceti (2003)
- Noah23 - "Birdfish" on Sigma Octantis (2004) (with Aloeight)
- John Tsunam - "When Blondes Go Bald" on Not Too Intelligent But Extremely Resourceful (2004)
- The Train Rawbers - "Vacuum Oyster Surprise!" on The Train Rawbers (2004)
- Ceschi - "Once" on Fake Flowers (2004)

Blue Sky Black Death

- Midaz - "Call the Police" on Beast Wars (2007)
- Sabac Red - "Engage My Words (Remix)", "The Ritual Pt. 1", "Darkness Deepens", "Anywhere" & "Shift of the Earth" on The Collection Vol. 2 (2007)
- Ill Bill - "Darkness Deepens" on Black Metal (2007)
- Juice - "Halos (Remix)" on The Death Certificate (2007)
- Gutta - all tracks except "Thrashin'" on Heads Will Roll (2008)
- T.H.U.G. Angelz - "Audiobiography (Remix)" on Welcome to Red Hook Houses (2008)
- Ras Kass - "Elevate" on Institutionalized Vol. 2 (2008)
- Sabac Red - "The Ritual", "Shift of the Earth" "Breaking Through" "Darkness Deepens" on The Ritual (2008)
- CunninLynguists - "The Park (Remix)" on Strange Journey Volume Two (2009)
- Virtuoso - "IntroFlection", "The Final Conflict", "Piercing", "Heartbeat Stopper", "No Fear", "Propaganda", "The Bay of Pigs" & "OutroSpection" on The Final Conflict (2010)
- Donnis - "Gimme" on "Break Hundreds & Hearts EP" (2012)
- Pepperboy - "Felon" on "Post Traumatic Stress (PTS)" & "Love My Life" on "Nitetime" (2012)
- Sadistik - "Russian Roulette", "City in Amber", "The Beast", "A Long Winter", on "Flowers for My Father" (2013)
- Run the Jewels - "36" Chain (BSBD Remix)", on "Run the Jewels (album)" (2013)
