= Ben Cooper (musician) =

American singer-songwriter

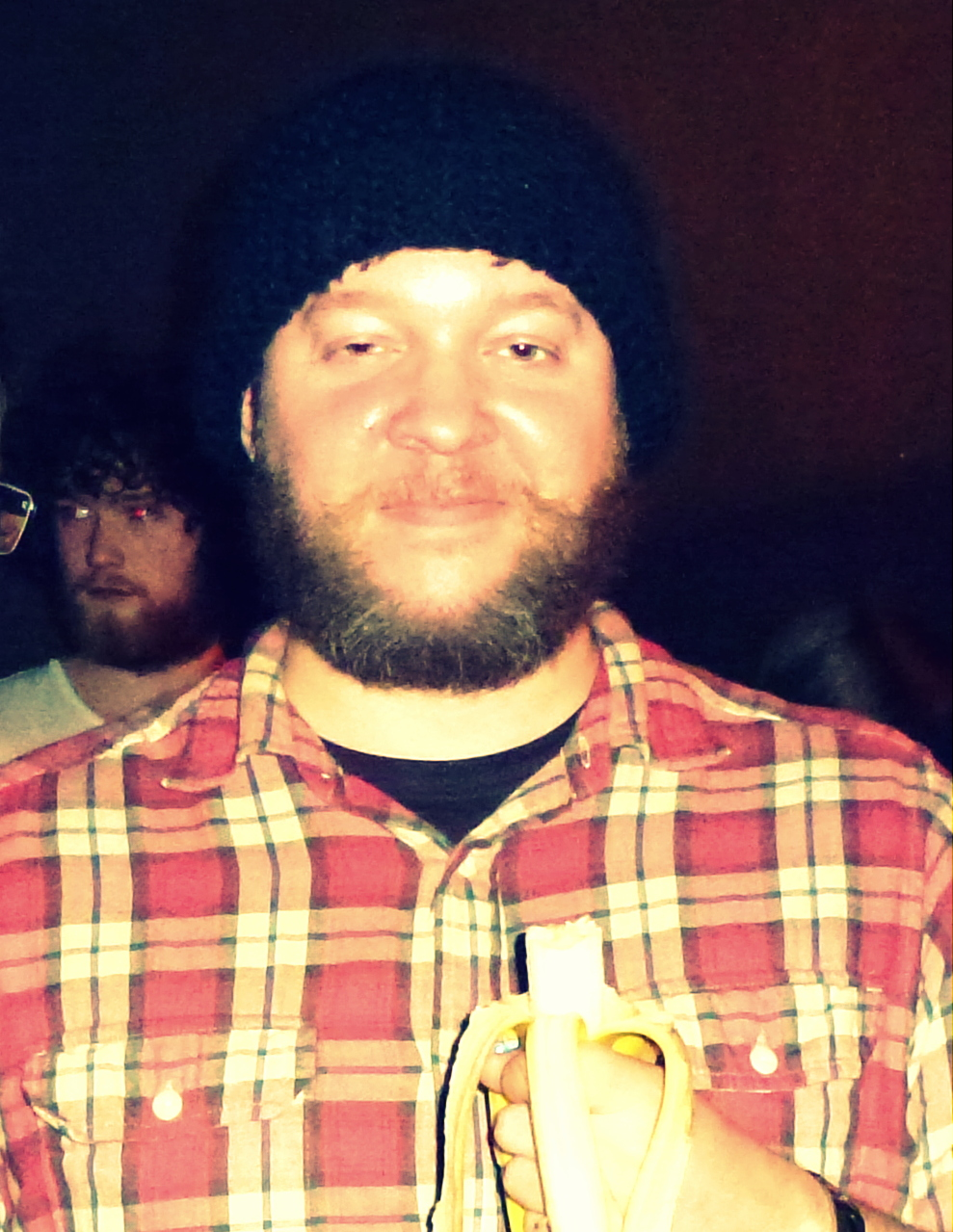
- Cooper in 2011

Background information
- Born: February 24, 1982 (age 44); Jacksonville, Florida, United States
- Genres: Acoustic rock; Indie folk; Instrumental
- Occupation: Singer-songwriter
- Instruments: guitar, accordion, banjo, drums, piano
- Website: www.radicalface.com

Benjamin P. Cooper (born February 24, 1982) is an American singer, songwriter, instrumentalist, and painter from Jacksonville, Florida. He currently releases music under the name Radical Face. Cooper is best known for the 2007 track "Welcome Home" from his debut album as Radical Face. He has also been a part of Electric President (with Alex Kane), Iron Orchestra (alongside his brother), The Clone Project (with Rick Colado), and Unkle Stiltskin.

== Early life ==
Ben Cooper was born in Jacksonville, Florida, and grew up in a family of nine siblings. He states his family as his biggest influence. His creative streak originated from a passion for drawing and painting early on, and by middle school he had begun making short movies with friends and playing music.

When Cooper was 14, he came out as gay to his parents. His stepfather then kicked him out of his home. Speaking of the experience, he said he "actually learned a lot about taking care of myself [...] I wouldn't recommend it, but it definitely had its benefits. There were a lot of things that I think I was pretty well-equipped to deal with, especially being a freelance musician."

At the age of 19, Cooper decided he wanted to become a writer and wrote two books. However, he did not backup his files and the computer crashed, so he took it outside and smashed it with a hammer. He decided to write music instead and worked it into a career, performing locally. Most of Cooper's tracks from his early recording period were recorded in a tool shed outside his house.

== Career ==
=== Early career and Unkle Stiltskin (2000–2003) ===
In 2002, Cooper, along with Corey Loop and later bass player/guitarist Alex Kane, formed a band that they called Unkle Stiltskin. They recorded songs together, but they never performed for an audience, released any recordings, or published any written or recorded music.

=== Electric President (2003–2010) ===
Cooper met Alex Kane in 2000 and the two later formed the band Radical Face vs Phalex Sledgehammer, later renamed Electric President. Cooper notes Electric President as what brought him his earliest professional success but with it experienced difficulty working with record companies to release music. After releasing a third album, The Violent Blue in 2010, Kane and Cooper began to focus on other projects, with Cooper pursuing work on his "Family Tree" albums under the name Radical Face.

=== Radical Face (2003–present) ===
Ghost (2007)

In March 2007, Radical Face released their first studio album, Ghost. The song "Welcome Home" became Cooper's biggest hit after being featured on an advertisement for Nikon cameras, and has been used in several commercials, films, and TV shows.

The Family Tree Albums (2011–2016)

Cooper launched a project called The Family Tree in 2011, a trilogy of concept albums that tell the story of a fictional family through several generations. Several songs from The Family Tree Albums have been featured in films and television.

Although Cooper intended for his "Family Tree" trilogy to be fictional when he began the project, the final album of the trilogy references actual events in his life. The songs "Everything Costs" and "Bad Blood" are written from Cooper's own point of view.

Missing Film (2018)

After creating music for a project that fell through, Cooper released Missing Film as an album of instrumental tracks that may be used by indie filmmakers for free.

A Light in the Woods

A Radical Face album called A Light in the Woods was released October 20, 2023. It involves "very elaborate world-building, both visual and written."

== Musical projects and contributions ==
=== Unreleased music ===
Cooper's first project as Radical Face, The Junkyard Chandelier, was never formally released. This album and many unreleased songs from his music career, including the album "Patients," are only available for download online.

=== The Blacklist ===
The American crime thriller television series The Blacklist has featured several songs by Radical Face: "Welcome Home", "Baptisms", "Always Gold", "The Road to Nowhere", "Summer Skeletons", and "Letters Home." In 2021, Jon Bokenkamp and John Bissell contacted Cooper to compose a song for the season 8 finale of The Blacklist. Cooper and musician Josh Lee released the song as the Radical Face single "One Last Dream" on June 23, 2021, the day the episode aired.

== Discography ==
=== As Radical Face ===
Albums

- The Junkyard Chandelier (2003) (unreleased)
- Ghost (2007)
- The Family Tree: The Roots (2011)
- The Family Tree: The Branches (2013)
- The Family Tree: The Leaves (2016)
- Missing Film (2018)
- Ghost (Anniversary Edition) (2019)
- A Light in the Woods (2023) (six-volume collection)
- B-Sides and Rarities 2002-2011 (2024)
- Mixtape (2024)
- Mixtape 2 (2025)

Compilations

- The Bastards (2016)

EPs

- Touch the Sky (2010)
- Always Gold (2012)
- SunnMoonnEclippse (2017)
- Covers, Vol 1: Lady Covers (2018)
- Therapy (2019)
- Therapy (Alternate Reality Version) (2019)
- Hidden Hollow, Vol. One (2021)

Singles

- Welcome Home (2011)
- Reveries (2020)
- Family (2021)
- Dreamless Sleep (2021)
- One Last Dream (2021)

=== With Electric President ===
Albums

- S/T (2006)
- Sleep Well (2006)
- The Violent Blue (2010)

EPs

- You Have the Right to Remain Awesome (2004)

=== With The Clone Project ===
- Clone (2014)
