= Wildlif3 =

Studio album by Def3 and Factor
- Released: June 24, 2014
- Genre: Hip-hop
- Length: 36:05
- Labels: Ship Records; Urbnet
- Producer: Factor

Def3 chronology
Drumbo (with Factor) (2009)	Wildlif3 (2014)	Small World (with Late Night Radio) (2017)

Factor chronology
Woke Up Alone (2013)	Wildlif3 (2014)	Scott Free... Red Handed (2014)

Professional ratings
Review scores
Source	Rating
Exclaim!	8/10
Jon Liedtke	3/5 stars
RapReviews	8/10

Wildlif3 is a studio album by Canadian rapper Def3 and Canadian producer Factor. It was released by Ship Records and Urbnet on June 24, 2014. The album features guest appearances from Clear Mortifee, Kay the Aquanaut, Ceschi, Shad, Skratch Bastid, Moka Only, Panther Matumona, Evil Ebenezer, Merkules and Krystle Dos Santos.

Four music videos were released, for the songs "So Far", "Babyface", "Catalina Wine Mixer", and the title track. In February of 2015, he toured the album through Bosnia, Germany, Amsterdam and France. Later in 2015, the album won Rap/Hip-Hop Recording of the Year at the Western Canadian Music Awards. In 2016, five tracks from Wildlif3 were remixed by producer Late Night Radio.

== Track listing ==
No.	Title	Length
1.	"Recipe Destiny" (featuring Clear Mortifee)	4:21
2.	"Babyface"	2:31
3.	"Wildlif3"	2:23
4.	"So Far"	3:26
5.	"Catalina Wine Mixer" (featuring Kay the Aquanaut)	3:42
6.	"Satellite" (featuring Ceschi)	4:00
7.	"The Truth" (featuring Shad and Skratch Bastid)	3:26
8.	"Live It Up" (featuring Moka Only and Panther Matumona)	3:14
9.	"Where Did We Go Wrong" (featuring Evil Ebenezer and Merkules)	2:41
10.	"Under the Influence"	3:03
11.	"As I Go" (featuring Krystle Dos Santos)	3:18
Total length:		36:05
