= Saffron (album) =

Studio album by Ron Contour & Factor Chandelier
- Released: March 23, 2010
- Recorded: 2008–2009
- Genre: Hip-hop
- Length: 29:32
- Label: Fake Four Inc.
- Producer: Factor Chandelier

Ron Contour chronology
The Summer of Ron (2009)	Saffron (2010)	Rontario (2010)

Factor Chandelier chronology
13 Stories (A Prelude) (2010)	Saffron (2010)	Lawson Graham (2010)

Saffron is a collaborative studio album by Canadian rapper Ron Contour (an alias of Moka Only) and Canadian producer Factor Chandelier. It was released by Fake Four Inc. on March 23, 2010. The album features one guest appearance from Def3.

Three music videos were released, for the songs "Glad", "Wondrous Things", and "Confused Nougat". The album reached number 14 on !earshot's hip-hop chart in April 2010. In July, they performed the album at the Fake Four Summer Tour. The tour, which went through Western United States, also included Open Mike Eagle and co-founder of Fake Four, Ceschi.

== Critical reception ==
Professional ratings
Review scores
Source	Rating
Okayplayer	80/100
RapReviews	6/10
StGA	5.7/10

Reviewers praised Factor's production, but criticized Contour's lyrical content.

Kevin Jones of Exclaim! stated "Factor proves an indispensable force here, contributing a wide range of tight, exacting backing tracks that draw their many interesting, sampled influences from all over the map." He said "Contour's malleable linguistics survive, owing more to his flow than to the content of his largely disjointed lyrics, though his well-placed delivery does play a large role in sustaining the album's quick pace."

Pedro Hernandez of RapReviews said "Overall, the production maintains a steady vibe, with a few choice cuts rising above the norm." He expressed Contour's "rhymes are enjoyable on some levels, they don’t carry the universal appeal of more conventional Moka Only verses. If you can dig abstract lyricism and enjoy the art that can be found within esoteric verses, you’ll likely enjoy Saffron quite a bit."

Adam Grabowski of Surviving the Golden Age argued that Contour "does seem to mix lyrics that border on the non-sequitur with that element that dominates mainstream rap bravado" which "take away from his strengths, the more quirky ways he puts rhymes together."

== Track listing ==
No.	Title	Length
1.	"Check It Out"	1:31
2.	"Diner"	2:02
3.	"Confused Nougat"	2:25
4.	"Glad"	2:41
5.	"Whipple Tree"	2:42
6.	"Prairie Wind"	2:19
7.	"Wondrous"	2:28
8.	"I Only Know"	2:42
9.	"Cheese Toast Feast"	1:59
10.	"Goes to JP"	2:22
11.	"Hop Scotch"	2:34
12.	"Shoe Box" (featuring Def3)	3:47
Total length:		29:32
