= Sovereign Soul =

Studio album by Myka 9 & Factor Chandelier
- Released: November 18, 2012
- Genre: Hip-hop
- Length: 44:30
- Label: Fake Four Inc.
- Producer: Factor Chandelier

Myka 9 & Factor Chandelier chronology
| Sovereign Soul (2012) | Famous Future Time Travel (2015) |

Sovereign Soul is a collaborative studio album by American rapper Myka 9 and Canadian producer Factor Chandelier. It was released on Fake Four Inc. in 2012. Music videos were created for "You Are Free" and "Mind Heights".

== Critical reception ==
Professional ratings
Review scores
| Source | Rating |
|---|---|
| Exclaim! | 9/10 |
| L.A. Record | favorable |
| Okayplayer | favorable |
| PopMatters | 6/10 stars |
| RapReviews.com | 7/10 |

Thomas Quinlan of Exclaim! gave the album a 9 out of 10, saying: "While Myka and Factor demonstrated their chemistry three years ago on previous collaboration 1969, Sovereign Soul distills that connection into an even better release." Meanwhile, Adam Maylone of PopMatters gave the album 6 stars out of 10, calling it "one of the most experimental hip hop records I've had the pleasure of hearing in 2012".

== Track listing ==
| No. | Title | Length |
|---|---|---|
| 1. | "Sovereign Soul" | 3:42 |
| 2. | "You Are Free" | 2:40 |
| 3. | "Bask in These Rays" (featuring Astronautalis and Ceschi) | 4:04 |
| 4. | "Hard Hit" | 3:40 |
| 5. | "Ode to Cosmosis" (featuring Abstract Rude, Freewill, and Moka Only) | 3:17 |
| 6. | "Mind Heights" | 3:14 |
| 7. | "Sexy to the Beat" | 3:04 |
| 8. | "Heaven Up" (featuring Johanna Phraze and Jnatural) | 3:46 |
| 9. | "Bless Me Out" (featuring Jah Orah) | 3:50 |
| 10. | "Zo Oh Owe Ning" (featuring Charli Rose) | 3:57 |
| 11. | "5 Mikes" (featuring Open Mike Eagle, Mykill Miers, Mic King, and Myk Mansun) | 4:01 |
| 12. | "Indigenous Areas" (featuring Erule) | 2:31 |
| 13. | "In So Far as We Know" | 2:44 |

== Personnel ==
Credits adapted from liner notes.

- Myka 9 – vocals
- Factor Chandelier – turntables, production, mixing
- Enver Hampton – bass guitar, additional synthesizer (3)
- Levitron – violin (1, 6), guitar (3, 5, 7, 8, 12, 13)
- Kwasi Adisi – trumpet (2, 10)
- Astronautalis – vocals (3)
- Ceschi – vocals (3)
- Abstract Rude – vocals (5)
- Freewill – vocals (5)
- Moka Only – vocals (5)
- Johanna Phraze – vocals (8)
- Jnatural – vocals (8)
- Josef Leimberg – horns (8)
- Jah Orah – vocals (9)
- Charli Rose – vocals (10)
- Open Mike Eagle – vocals (11)
- Mykill Miers – vocals (11)
- Mic King – vocals (11)
- Myk Mansun – vocals (11)
- Erule – vocals (12)
- Jeff Smothers – mastering
- Rachel VonCookie – photography
- 319 – design, illustration
