= The Landmark (album) =

2011 rap album

Studio album by Awol One & Factor Chandelier
- Released: January 13, 2011
- Genre: Hip-hop
- Length: 38:52
- Label: Fake Four Inc.
- Producer: Factor Chandelier

Awol One & Factor Chandelier chronology
Owl Hours (2009)	The Landmark (2011)

Professional ratings
Review scores
Source	Rating
East Bay Express	unfavorable
PopMatters	5/10 stars
RapReviews.com	7/10
Robert Christgau	(2-star Honorable Mention)

The Landmark is the third collaborative studio album by American rapper Awol One and Canadian producer Factor Chandelier. It was released on Fake Four Inc. in 2011.

== Critical reception ==
Matthew Fiander of PopMatters gave the album 5 stars out of 10, saying, "More so than any of his other records, The Landmark makes Awol One's laid-back gruffness feel like a crafted persona, one whose elements don't quite work together." Bailey Pennick of East Bay Express said, "The twelve-track journey into Awol One's lyrical stream of consciousness results in a relatively boring listening experience."

== Track listing ==
No.	Title	Length
1.	"Coming to Town"	2:42
2.	"Perfect Opposites"	3:02
3.	"Never Gonna Take Us Out" (featuring Ceschi)	3:02
4.	"Frenemies"	2:16
5.	"The Wasp" (featuring Moka Only)	3:08
6.	"Don't Be Afraid"	3:33
7.	"People on Drugs"	3:11
8.	"Daze Go Bye" (featuring Buck 65)	3:37
9.	"Rewind Yourself"	3:13
10.	"One Live Tape" (featuring Ahmad and Abstract Rude)	4:38
11.	"Real Late"	3:32
12.	"Lonely Again"	2:56
