= Owl Hours =

Studio album by Awol One & Factor Chandelier
- Released: July 21, 2009
- Genre: Hip-hop
- Length: 38:29
- Label: Fake Four Inc.
- Producer: Factor Chandelier

Awol One & Factor Chandelier chronology
Only Death Can Kill You (2007)	Owl Hours (2009)	The Landmark (2011)

Professional ratings
Review scores
Source	Rating
AllMusic	3/5 stars
The A.V. Club	C−
Exclaim!	favorable
HipHopDX	2.5/5
L.A. Record	favorable
Okayplayer	favorable
RapReviews.com	5/10

Owl Hours is the second collaborative studio album by American rapper Awol One and Canadian producer Factor Chandelier. It was released on Fake Four Inc. in 2009.

== Critical reception ==
Michaelangelo Matos of The A.V. Club gave the album a grade of C−, calling it "an annoying one." Thomas Quinlan of Exclaim! said, "While the mainstream might not be ready for Awol One, Owl Hours is evidence that he's more than ready for them, and getting impatient."

== Track listing ==
No.	Title	Length
1.	"Glamorous Drunk"	2:49
2.	"Celebrate"	2:43
3.	"Official"	2:53
4.	"Stand Up" (featuring Myka 9 and Aesop Rock)	3:28
5.	"Up Downtown"	2:47
6.	"Destination"	2:48
7.	"Waste the Wine" (featuring Tash and E-Swift)	3:18
8.	"Back Then" (featuring Gregory Pepper and Ceschi)	3:31
9.	"Darkness" (featuring Sunspot Jonz, Gel Roc, and Jizzm)	3:20
10.	"Brains Out" (featuring Xzibit)	3:59
11.	"Sunset Sandwich"	2:51
