= 1969 (Myka 9 album) =

Studio album by Myka 9
- Released: January 15, 2009
- Genre: Hip-hop
- Length: 46:01
- Label: Fake Four Inc.
- Producer: Factor Chandelier

Myka 9 chronology
Citrus Sessions Vol. 1 (2006)	1969 (2009)	Mykology (2011)

1969 is a studio album by American rapper Myka 9. It was released on Fake Four Inc. in 2009. Entirely produced by Canadian producer Factor Chandelier, it features guest appearances from Aceyalone, Busdriver, Awol One, and Gel Roc. The title of the album comes from the year Myka 9 was born and the zeal of that era. In promotion of the album, Myka 9 toured across Western United States with Factor, Sole, Ceschi, Def3, and LoveMoney.

== Critical reception ==
Professional ratings
Review scores
Source	Rating
East Bay Express	favorable
Exclaim!	favorable
Hip Hop Core	4/5 stars
IGN	9.7/10
RapReviews.com	7/10
URB	4/5 stars
XLR8R	7/10

Spence D. of IGN gave the album a 9.7 out of 10, saying: "At the risk of sounding hyperbolic, Myka 9 has dropped one of the best, most expansive, and deeply rooted rap albums to hit the scene in quite some time." Thomas Quinlan of Exclaim! said, "Myka 9 is one of the best, most slept on MCs making music today, and 1969 is the best work he's done in a long time."

== Track listing ==
No.	Title	Length
1.	"Real Song"	2:43
2.	"Inner Knowing"	3:32
3.	"Soul Beat"	4:12
4.	"Snake Bite"	3:20
5.	"To the Sky"	2:40
6.	"Options" (featuring Aceyalone)	2:52
7.	"Cadillac Nights"	4:00
8.	"Chopper" (featuring Busdriver)	2:19
9.	"Elevated"	3:24
10.	"Liberty"	2:43
11.	"Hand Bone"	2:03
12.	"Monte Carlo"	2:21
13.	"Good Old Smokey (My Kanine)"	3:03
14.	"91 Octane" (featuring Awol One and Gel Roc)	3:23
15.	"1969"	3:32

== Personnel ==
Credits adapted from liner notes.

- Myka 9 – vocals
- Factor Chandelier – production, mixing
- Josh Palmer – bass guitar (1), mixing
- Josef Leimberg – trumpet (2)
- Shannon Ivey – backing vocals (2, 5, 6, 13, 15)
- Aceyalone – vocals (6)
- Busdriver – vocals (8)
- Awol One – vocals (14)
- Gel Roc – vocals (14)
- Jeremy Goody – mastering
- Lazerus Pit – cover art
- 319 – design, layout
