= Kirby Dominant =

American rapper

- Also known as: Kirby D, Kirb
- Born: Kirby Dominick; November 2, 1975 (age 50); Oakland, California
- Origin: Oakland, California
- Genre: Alternative hip-hop
- Occupations: Rapper; songwriter; record producer
- Years active: 1998-present
- Labels: Fake Four Inc., Rapitalism Records, Dominant Records, Side Road Records
- Member of: Paranoid Castle
- Formerly of: Dominant Mammals

Kirby Dominick, better known by his stage name Kirby Dominant, is an American rapper from Oakland, California. AllMusic described him as "an upcoming force in the San Francisco Bay Area's brightening hip-hop scene". He is one half of the duo Paranoid Castle alongside the producer Factor Chandelier.

== Career ==
Kirby Dominant released his first solo album, Rapitalism: The Philosophies of Dominant Pimpin', in 1998. In 2002, he released Super Future Stars, a collaborative album with Moka Only, under the name Dominant Mammals. In 2004, he released One Way Ticket, a collaborative album with Factor Chandelier under the name Paranoid Castle. He released his second solo album, Starr: The Contemplations of a Dominator, in 2006. To celebrate his 10th anniversary of releasing records, Kirby Dominant released the Prostitute EP in 2008. The second Paranoid Castle album, Champagne Nightmares, was released on Fake Four Inc. in 2011, and the third, Welcome to Success, was released in 2014.

== Discography ==
Albums

- Rapitalism: The Philosophies of Dominant Pimpin' (1998)
- Savage Intelligence (1998) (with King Koncepts, as Konceptual Dominance)
- Dominant Mammals (2000) (with Moka Only, as The Dominant Mammals)
  - Super Future Stars (reissue) (2002) (with Moka Only, as The Dominant Mammals)
- One Way Ticket (2004) (with Factor Chandelier, as Paranoid Castle)
- Niggaz and White Girlz (2005) (with Chris Sinister, as Kirb and Chris)
- Starr: The Contemplations of a Dominator (2006)
- Champagne Nightmares (2011) (Paranoid Castle)
- Welcome to Success (2014) (Paranoid Castle)

EPs

- Radio Shock (2004)
- Prostitute (2008)

Singles

- "Microphone" (1998)
- "Self Titled" (1999) (Konceptual Dominance)
- "Fresh & Dope" (2003) (The Dominant Mammals)
- "All That I Can Git" (2006)
- "So Brand New" (2007) (Kirb and Chris)

Guest appearances

- The Grouch - "Car Troubles Pt. 2" from Nothing Changes (1996)
- Murs - "Interview with the Dominant" and "Dominant Freestyle" from F'Real (1997)
- DJ Murge - “What You Got” from Search and Rescue (2002)
- Factor Chandelier - "Everybody to the Front" from Con-Soul Confessions (2003)
- Factor - "Laugh and Cry" from Three (2003)
- Dashiell - "What's Life..." (2005)
- Factor - "Famous Nights and Empty Days" from Famous Nights and Empty Days (2006)
- Dashiell - "Pimp Overload" (2006)
- Joe Dub & Factor - "Canadian Summer" from Live in 75 (2007)
- Factor - "More Than Love" from Lawson Graham (2010)
- Mystik Journeymen - "Anthill Sheriff" from Return 2 the Love (2010)
- Myka 9 - "Oh Yeah... Alright" from Mykology (2012)
- Gregory Pepper & Madadam - "Let's Be Homies" from Big Huge Truck (2013)
- Factor - "The Empire Has Fallen" from Woke Up Alone (2013)
