= The Great Depression (Common Grackle album) =

Studio album by Common Grackle
- Released: August 5, 2010
- Genres: Indie pop, alternative hip-hop
- Length: 31:28
- Label: Fake Four Inc.
- Producer: Factor Chandelier

Common Grackle chronology
The Great Depression (2010)	The Great Repression (2011)

Professional ratings
Review scores
Source	Rating
Exclaim!	favorable
URB	favorable

The Great Depression is the debut studio album by Canadian musical duo Common Grackle. It was released on Fake Four Inc. in 2010. It features guest appearances from Kool Keith and Ceschi.

== Critical reception ==
Brett Uddenberg of URB gave the album 4 stars out of 5, saying, "The dense lyrics and smooth delivery of Pepper, avant-garde production of Factor Chandelier and short-but-sweet guest shots from Ceschi all make for a wildly-entertaining and rewarding listen." Evan Sawdey of PopMatters called it "one of 2010's hidden musical gems."

== Track listing ==
No.	Title	Length
1.	"Thank God It's Monday" (featuring Kool Keith)	3:11
2.	"Churchill's Black Dog"	1:02
3.	"The Great Depression" (featuring Ceschi)	3:54
4.	"All the Pawns"	2:36
5.	"At the Grindcore Show"	1:54
6.	"Down with the Ship"	3:24
7.	"Big Marquee"	3:28
8.	"Please Stop"	2:55
9.	"Safe Word Play"	1:46
10.	"Magic Beans" (featuring Ceschi)	2:45
11.	"Hannibal Lecture"	1:08
12.	"Purgatory Rock and Roll"	3:26
