= Def3 =

- Born: Daniel Fernandez; December 22, 1981 (age 44)
- Genre: Hip-hop
- Occupations: Rapper; songwriter; DJ; graffiti artist
- Years active: 2003–present
- Labels: Ship Records; Urbnet Records; Side Road Records
- Website: def3.ca

Daniel Fernandez (born December 22, 1981), better known by his stage name Def3, is a Canadian rapper from Regina, Saskatchewan, based in Vancouver, British Columbia. He is the founder of Ship Records, and a past member of the groups Dead Can't Bounce and Metropolis Now, as well as a touring member of Vancouver's Sweatshop Union. He has been nominated five times at the Western Canadian Music Awards, including a win for his 2014 album Wildlif3. He performed at the 2010 Winter Olympics. He has also performed twice at South by Southwest, in 2009 and 2014.

== Discography ==
=== Albums ===
Solo

- Hug Life (Ship, 2005) (produced by Merky Waters)
- Drumbo (Side Road, 2009) (produced by Factor)
- Wildlif3 (Ship/Urbnet, 2014) (produced by Factor)
- Small World (Ship, 2017) (produced by Late Night Radio)
- Weddings and Funerals (Urbnet, 2021) (produced by Late Night Radio)

Collaborations

- I Aint Afraid of No Ghost (Frek Sho, 2003) (with Ira Lee, as Dead Can't Bounce)
- Metropolis Now (Side Road, 2006) (with Factor, Forgetful Jones & Kay the Aquanaut, as Metropolis Now)
- Dog River (Ship, 2007) (with Moka Only)

=== EPs ===
- The Hardy Boys of Rap (Goodbye, 2003) (with Ira Lee, as Dead Can't Bounce)
- Amnesia (2011) (produced by Mosaic)
- Wildlif3: Late Night Radio Remixes (Urbnet, 2016) (produced by Late Night Radio)
- Small World Remixes (Ship, 2020)

Singles

- Dr. Fresch & Def3 - " Gladiator" (2023)
- Sodown & Def3 - " It Was All A Dream " (2024)
- Def3 & Pineo & Loeb - " Limitless " (2024)

=== Guest appearances ===
- Factor – "What Up Sun" from Three (2003)
- Cam the Wizzard – "Side Road Trip" from For the Rest of My Life (2004)
- Factor – "Our Glass" from Heights (2005)
- Nolto & Factor – "Forum" from Red All Over (2005)
- Factor – "What Could've Been" & "Boundaries" from Side Road and Friends: B-Sides and Unreleased Hits (2006)
- Factor – "I Can't Put My Finger on It" from Famous Nights and Empty Days (2006)
- NoBS Allowed – "Boundaries" from No Phukkin Clu (2006)
- RDS – "Lookin' Up" from Open Mic (2006)
- Factor – "Boundaries" & "What Could've Been" from After the Fact (2006)
- Kay the Aquanaut – "To the Last Drop" from Spinning Blue Planet (2007)
- Selfhelp – "Mantra" from Old Friends (2009)
- Factor – "Old Souls", "What Now!" & "Take Me Higher" from Old Souls Vol. 1 (2009)
- Selfhelp – "The Mantra" from Dead Old Friends (2009)
- Kay the Aquanaut – "Roll Call" from Nickelodeon Ethics (2010)
- Factor – "Speed Demon", "Periodic Table" & "What Could've Been" from Old Souls Vol. 2 (2010)
- D.Dove & Factor – "Bartender" from Screwg McDovey (2010)
- Factor – "" from 13 Stories (A Prelude) (2010)
- Metawon – "No Return" from Choplifter! (2010)
- Ron Contour & Factor – "Shoe Box" from Saffron (2010)
- Factor – "Battle Scars" from Lawson Graham (2010)
- Forgetful Jones – "18 Forever" from Awake the Giant EP (2010)
- Aries – "The Mantra", "Focus on Tomorrow", "On Time", "I Don't Wanna Go Home" & "The Visitor's" from Now and Then (2010)
- Milled Pavement Records – "Periodic Table" from Goose Bumps 4.0 (2010)
- Kay the Aquanaut – "Window Seat" from Waterloo (2011)
- Evil Ebenezer & Factor – "Leave the Dead" from Widows Creek (2011)
- Factor – "Battle Scars" & "Colour Scheme" from Old Souls Vol. 3 (2012)
- Sweatshop Union – "Feed" & "We Ready" from Infinite (2013)
- Dragon Fli Empire – "Gimme the Mic" from Mission Statement (2013)
- Swamp Thing – "Meat Lump" from Outer Limits (2014)
- Cristian Moya & Merky Waters – "Show Goes On" from Learners (2017)
- The Funk Hunters – "Revolution" from Typecast (2018)
- Factor Chandelier – "Lost My Way" from Time Invested II (2022)

== Awards and nominations ==
Western Canadian Music Awards

Awards and nominations at the Western Canadian Music Awards
Year	Award	Result	Ref(s)
2008	Outstanding Urban Recording Dog River (with Moka Only)	Nominated	
2010	Rap/Hip-Hop Recording of the Year Drumbo (with Factor)	Nominated	
2014	Rap/Hip-Hop Recording of the Year Wildlif3 (with Factor)	Won	
2018	Rap/Hip-Hop Artist of the Year Def3	Nominated	
2022	Rap/Hip-Hop Artist of the Year Def3 and Late Night Radio	Nominated	
