= Whippletree =

Whippletree (also as Whipple-tree and similar variations) may refer to:

- Whippletree, a very old plant name for species of dogwood (see: Cornus (genus))
- Whippletree (mechanism), a pivot mechanism used to distribute force evenly, used for draught animals and in windscreen (windshield) wipers
- "Whipple Tree", a song by Ron Contour and Factor Chandelier from the album Saffron, 2010
