= Champagne Nightmares =

Studio album by Paranoid Castle
- Released: August 30, 2011
- Genre: Hip-hop
- Length: 40:58
- Label: Fake Four Inc.
- Producer: Factor Chandelier

Paranoid Castle chronology
One Way Ticket (2004)	Champagne Nightmares (2011)	Welcome to Success (2014)

Professional ratings
Review scores
Source	Rating
Dead Magazine	mixed
Okayplayer	mixed
RapReviews.com	7.5/10

Champagne Nightmares is the second studio album by Paranoid Castle, a hip-hop duo consisting of Canadian producer Factor Chandelier and American rapper Kirby Dominant. It was released on Fake Four Inc. in 2011. On August 25, 2011, URB premiered the music video for "Orca".

== Critical reception ==
Steve Juon of RapReviews.com gave the album a 7.5 out of 10, saying, "It's hard not to recommend Paranoid Castle to everybody reading except for one thing: it's just not going to be boom bap enough for some or macho enough for others." Niela Orr of Okayplayer said, "The beats are one of the likable things on the album, and it's clear that Factor is intent on purposefully matching the tone of Dominant's swirly, machismo laced, man-boy bragging."

== Track listing ==
No.	Title	Length
1.	"Champagne Intro"	0:19
2.	"Orca"	3:35
3.	"Feeling Inside"	3:56
4.	"Stacey's Doing Way Too Much"	2:45
5.	"The Mature Life"	3:50
6.	"Audacity of Me"	4:29
7.	"Champagne Interlude"	1:11
8.	"Little Girl"	3:59
9.	"D.U.I."	2:55
10.	"Weed Man"	2:42
11.	"Some Place Else"	4:23
12.	"You Don't Understand"	3:01
13.	"Champagne Nightmares!"	3:44
