= The One Man Band Broke Up =

Studio album by Ceschi
- Released: June 27, 2010
- Genre: Hip-hop
- Length: 40:35
- Labels: Fake Four Inc.; Equinox Records
- Producers: DJ Scientist; Ceschi

Ceschi chronology
They Hate Francisco False (2006)	The One Man Band Broke Up (2010)	Broken Bone Ballads (2015)

The One Man Band Broke Up is a solo studio album by American hip-hop artist Ceschi. It was released on Fake Four Inc. and Equinox Records in 2010. It is a concept album about the rise and fall of a musician named Julius.

== Critical reception ==
Professional ratings
Review scores
Source	Rating
AllMusic	3/5 stars
Exclaim!	favorable
The Phoenix	4/4 stars
RapReviews.com	6.5/10
Tiny Mix Tapes	3.5/5 stars
URB	4/5 stars

Brett Uddenberg of URB gave the album 4 stars out of 5, saying, "Ceschi brilliantly captures the beauty of the musician pouring his soul into his craft in spite of the transitory and often-unappreciated nature of such an existence." Chris Faraone of The Phoenix gave the album 4 stars out of 4 and called it "a triumph of triumphs." Joe Hemmerling of Tiny Mix Tapes gave the album 3.5 stars out of 5, commenting that "The One Man Band Broke Up isn't an easy listen, nor a uniformly enjoyable one, but if you've got the stomach for it, it will take you places that few other artists dare to tread." Thomas Quinlan of Exclaim! wrote, "The One Man Broke Up is an ambitious effort, but Ceschi succeeds in telling his story with great detail and atmosphere."

== Track listing ==
No.	Title	Producer(s)	Length
1.	"The One Man Band Broke Up"	DJ Scientist	2:20
2.	"Half Mast"	DJ Scientist	4:03
3.	"No New York"	DJ Scientist	3:42
4.	"Lament for Captain Julius"	Ceschi	2:22
5.	"Fallen Famous"	DJ Scientist	3:31
6.	"Bridge"	DJ Scientist	1:52
7.	"Serious Business"	DJ Scientist	0:29
8.	"Hangman" (featuring Shoshin, Mic King, and David Ramos)	DJ Scientist	4:37
9.	"Bad Jokes"	DJ Scientist	3:43
10.	"For My Disappointing Hip Hop Heroes"	Ceschi	1:56
11.	"Long Live the Short Lived" (featuring Sole)	DJ Scientist	6:04
12.	"Swallowed Salt"	DJ Scientist	0:58
13.	"Julius' Final Song"	DJ Scientist	5:02
Total length:			40:35

== Personnel ==
Credits adapted from liner notes.

- Ceschi – vocals, lyrics, production (4, 10), guitar (3, 4, 10), bass guitar (3, 4), synthesizer (3, 4), organ (3), banjo (4), ukulele (4), violin (10), glockenspiel (10)
- DJ Scientist – production (1–3, 5–9, 11–13), mixing
- Astronautalis – backing vocals (3)
- Max Heath – piano (4, 10), accordion (4, 10), steelpan (10), backing vocals (13)
- 2econd Class Citizen – drum programming (5)
- Tommy V – backing vocals (6)
- Shoshin – vocals (8), lyrics (8)
- Mic King – vocals (8), lyrics (8)
- David Ramos – vocals (8), lyrics (8)
- Sole – vocals (11), lyrics (11)
- Ben Cooper – guitar (13), bass guitar (13), piano (13)
- Tom Filepp – backing vocals (13)
- Madelaine Johnston – backing vocals (13)
- Playpad Circus – mixing
- Jeff Smothers – mastering
- The Raincoat Man – artwork
