= Cars & Trains =

- Also known as: Tom Filepp, True Deceiver
- Born: Thomas Robert Filepp
- Origin: Portland, Oregon
- Genres: Folktronica
- Occupations: Singer-songwriter, record producer, multi-instrumentalist
- Years active: 2006–present
- Labels: Fake Four Inc., Circle into Square
- Website: carsandtrains.bandcamp.com

Thomas Robert "Tom" Filepp, better known by his stage name Cars & Trains, is an American multi-instrumentalist from Portland, Oregon, and the founder of indie label Circle Into Square Records. Sputnikmusic described him as "an excellent songwriter if anything else".

== Career ==
Cars & Trains' first album, Rusty String, was released on his own label Circle Into Square in 2007. His second album, The Roots, the Leaves, was released on Fake Four Inc. in 2010. He released the third album, We Are All Fire, in early 2012. We Are All Storms, a companion EP to the album, was released later that year.

== Discography ==
=== Studio albums ===
- Rusty String (2008)
- The Roots, the Leaves (2010)
- We Are All Fire (2012)
- Dust (2015)
- Fictions (due 2017)

=== Compilation albums ===
- Consumer Confidence Vol. 1 (2006)
- Consumer Confidence Vol. 2 (2007)

=== Remix albums ===
- The Roots, the Remix (2010)

=== Live albums ===
- Live on KBOO (2010)

=== EPs ===
- 2AM (2006)
- Little Song (2008)
- We Are All Storms (2012)

=== Singles ===
- "The Sun Always Sets" b/w "The Leaves" (2010)

=== Guest appearances ===
- Factor Chandelier – "Every Morning" from Lawson Graham (2010)
- Sole – "My Veganism" from No Wising Up No Settling Down (2013)

=== Productions ===
- Noah23 – "Nuts" from Fry Cook on Venus (2011)
