= Noir (Blue Sky Black Death album) =

Studio album by Blue Sky Black Death
- Released: April 26, 2011
- Length: 62:48
- Label: Fake Four Inc.
- Producer: Blue Sky Black Death

Blue Sky Black Death chronology
Third Party (2010)	Noir (2011)	Glaciers (2013)

Noir (stylized as NOIR) is a studio album by American hip-hop production duo Blue Sky Black Death. It was released on Fake Four Inc. in 2011.

== Release ==
Noir was originally released on Fake Four Inc. on April 26, 2011. Screwed versions of several of the tracks were released on Blue Sky Black Death's Bandcamp, as Noir + Violet. Later, the group also released a deluxe digital reissue of the album, titled Noir Dlxe, which includes the screwed versions, four alternate tracks from the original Noir release, and three more tracks, for a total of 29 tracks at a length of more than 2 hours.

In 2013, a limited-run two-disc vinyl pressing was done, featuring the original track listing, two alternates, as well as a previously unreleased track, "Thirteen", which does not appear on the deluxe digital release. It also features a new album cover. It was followed by a later re-pressing in 2014. A 10-year vinyl reissue was announced in March 2021.

== Critical reception ==
Professional ratings
Review scores
Source	Rating
Alarm	favorable
Beats Per Minute	81/100
Pitchfork	7.5/10
URB	4/5 stars

Brett Uddenberg of URB gave the album 4 out of 5 stars, calling it "a brilliant culmination of reverb-coated keys and lush string arrangements". Marc Hogan of Pitchfork gave the album a 7.5 out of 10, writing: "Using an impressively nuanced deployment of strings, piano, and guitar as well as drum loops and hazy synths, the album has a patient, steady beauty, ranging from glowing panoramas evoking M83 to the classical-informed abstraction of Anticon acts like Dosh and Son Lux." Tom Harrison of Alarm described it as "an album of hazy instrumental beats that skirt the boundary between hip-hop and electronica." Will Ryan of Beats Per Minute said, "they set out on another scratchy, emotionally momentous odyssey of gigantic synth melodies with a deluge of shape-shifting samples ranging from mournful vocal washes to chirping orchestral arrangements backed by stomping mid-tempo drum programming."

== Track listing ==
Noir (original edition)
No.	Title	Length
1.	"Our Hearts of Ruin"	5:32
2.	"Sleeping Children Are Still Flying"	6:00
3.	"And Stars, Ringed"	5:10
4.	"To the Ends of the Earth"	3:54
5.	"Farewell to the Former World"	5:34
6.	"Falling Short"	1:46
7.	"Gold In Gold Out"	5:20
8.	"Where Do We Go"	4:37
9.	"In the Quiet Absence of God"	2:05
10.	"Where the Sun Beats"	4:45
11.	"Starry"	4:39
12.	"Fire for Light"	3:53
13.	"Swords from Driftwood"	2:46
14.	"Sky with Hand"	6:40
Total length:		62:48

Noir + Violet (digital edition)
No.	Title	Length
1.	"Our Hearts of Ruin (Screwed Up)"	6:59
2.	"Sleeping Children Are Still Flying (Screwed Up)"	7:35
3.	"And Stars, Ringed (Screwed Up)"	6:32
4.	"Farewell to the Former World (Screwed Up)"	7:01
5.	"Gold In, Gold Out (Screwed Up)"	6:44
6.	"Where the Sun Beats (Screwed Up)"	6:00
7.	"Swords from Driftwood (Screwed Up)"	3:30
8.	"Sky with Hand (Screwed Up)"	8:25
Total length:		52:46

Noir Dlxe (digital edition)
No.	Title	Length
1.	"Our Hearts of Ruin"	5:32
2.	"Sleeping Children Are Still Flying"	6:00
3.	"And Stars, Ringed"	5:10
4.	"To the Ends of the Earth"	3:54
5.	"Farewell to the Former World"	5:34
6.	"Falling Short"	1:46
7.	"Gold In Gold Out"	5:20
8.	"Where Do We Go"	4:37
9.	"In the Quiet Absence of God"	2:05
10.	"Where the Sun Beats"	4:45
11.	"Starry"	4:39
12.	"Fire for Light"	3:53
13.	"Swords from Driftwood"	2:46
14.	"Sky with Hand"	6:40
15.	"Sleeping Children Are Still Flying (Alternate)"	3:50
16.	"Gold In Gold Out (Alternate)"	5:17
17.	"Our Hearts of Ruin (Alternate)"	4:00
18.	"And Stars, Ringed (Alternate)"	1:16
19.	"Our Hearts of Ruin (Screwed Up)"	6:59
20.	"Sleeping Children Are Still Flying (Screwed Up)"	7:35
21.	"And Stars, Ringed (Screwed Up)"	6:32
22.	"Farewell to the Former World (Screwed Up)"	7:01
23.	"Gold In, Gold Out (Screwed Up)"	6:44
24.	"Where the Sun Beats (Screwed Up)"	6:00
25.	"Swords from Driftwood (Screwed Up)"	3:30
26.	"Sky with Hand (Screwed Up)"	8:25
27.	"Small Moment"	3:59
28.	"To Hold and Hope"	3:58
29.	"Waters Clear as Heaven"	2:17
Total length:		140:11

Noir (vinyl reissue edition)
No.	Title	Length
1.	"Our Hearts of Ruin"	5:32
2.	"Sleeping Children Are Still Flying"	6:00
3.	"And Stars, Ringed"	5:10
4.	"To the Ends of the Earth"	3:54
5.	"Farewell to the Former World"	5:34
6.	"Falling Short"	1:46
7.	"Gold In Gold Out"	5:20
8.	"Where Do We Go"	4:37
9.	"In the Quiet Absence of God"	2:05
10.	"Where the Sun Beats"	4:45
11.	"Starry"	4:39
12.	"Fire for Light"	3:53
13.	"Swords from Driftwood"	2:46
14.	"Sky with Hand"	6:40
15.	"Thirteen"	13:00
16.	"To Hold and Hope"	3:58
17.	"Sleeping Children Are Still Flying (Alternate)"	3:50
18.	"Gold In Gold Out (Alternate)"	5:17
Total length:		88:53

== Personnel ==
Credits adapted from liner notes.

- Blue Sky Black Death – instrumentation, arrangement, recording, mixing
- Raised by Wolves – additional musical contributions (1, 2, 4, 5, 7, 9, 11, 12, 13 14)
- Rob Harris – vocals (3, 4, 8)
- Shaprece Renee – vocals (7, 12)
- Alexander Chen – viola (9, 11, 12), vocals (12)
- Tim Green – artwork, layout
