= Common Grackle (band) =

Canadian musical duo

- Origin: Canada
- Genres: Indie pop, alternative hip hop
- Years active: 2010-present
- Label: Fake Four Inc.
- Members: Gregory Pepper; Factor Chandelier

Common Grackle is a Canadian musical duo consisting of singer-songwriter Gregory Pepper and producer Factor Chandelier.

== Discography ==
- The Great Depression (2010)
- The Great Repression (2011)
- Old Dog New Tricks Who This (2021)
