= Electric President =

Background information
- Origin: Jacksonville, Florida
- Genres: Electronic, indie pop, indietronica, glitch
- Years active: 2003–2010
- Labels: Morr Music, Fake Four Inc
- Members: Ben Cooper; Alex Kane
- Website: www.radicalface.com/music/elec...

Electric President is a Jacksonville, Florida musical group started in 2003 by Ben Cooper and Alex Kane. Both were in Helicopter Project prior to its breakup though no music from this group was ever released. Afterwards the pair decided to continue to make music together. They subsequently completed three albums in six months. Ben Cooper is also a member of Radical Face (Formerly known as Radical Face Versus Phalex Sledgehammer), Iron Orchestra, and Mother's Basement. The Electric President tracks and most of Ben Cooper's projects are recorded in a tool shed in back of his house that he has converted into a recording studio.

Electric President's first release was a pseudo-eponymous album (named S/T rather than "Electric President") in early 2006, on German electronica label Morr Music. Pitchfork rated it 6.7 out of ten. They gained limited mainstream fame after their music was featured on Fox Network's hit show The OC. At the end of the thirteenth episode of season three, titled "The Pot Stirrer", the song "Insomnia" is prominently featured in the closing sequence.

The record Sleep Well was released June 9, 2008 for Europe and June 24, 2008 for the US. The album received a rating score of six out of ten from PopMatters, which noted, "The various moods portrayed across Sleep Well make for a solid listen sure to keep your attention, even though everything feels a bit safe."

In 2009 Electric President left Morr Music and released their third album, The Violent Blue, with Fake Four Inc. It was given a rating of six by PopMatters. The album was largely made up of songs left over from the making of the group's previous album, Sleep Well. After The Violent Blue, Electric President went into hiatus as Alex Kane wanted to further his career and Ben Cooper focused on other projects, like Radical Face.

Electric President's mix of glitch, electronica and indie songwriting has been compared to The Postal Service, Styrofoam, The Weakerthans and Anticon's cLOUDDEAD.

In 2013, Ben Cooper announced on the Radical Face website that himself and Alex were planning a fourth Electric President album. He also hinted that it could be a dance record.

== Discography ==
=== Albums ===
- S/T (24 January 2006, Morr Music)
- Sleep Well (24 June 2008, Morr Music)
- The Violent Blue (23 February 2010, Fake Four Inc.)

=== Music videos ===
Year	Song
2006	Insomnia
2006	Grand Machine No 12
2008	It's an Ugly Life
2008	Explanatory
2008	scrapbook 1
2008	scrapbook 2
2008	Monsters
2009	The Violent Blue
2010	Feathers
