= Candy Cigarette =

Candy Cigarette may refer to:

- Candy cigarette, a type of candy
- The third album by the band Boy in Static
- Iconic photo by Sally Mann
