= Paranoid Castle =

Canadian alt hip-hop duo formed 2004

- Origin: Saskatoon, Canada; Oakland, California, United States
- Genre: Alternative hip-hop
- Years active: 2004–present
- Labels: Fake Four Inc., Side Road Records
- Members: Factor Chandelier; Kirby Dominant

Paranoid Castle is an alternative hip-hop duo, consisting of Canadian producer Factor Chandelier and American rapper Kirby Dominant. The duo released their first album, One Way Ticket, in 2004. Their second album, Champagne Nightmares, was released on Fake Four Inc. in 2011. The two also collaborated on the song "Don't Give Up" off of Factor's 2013 album Woke Up Alone. Their third album, Welcome to Success, was released on Fake Four Inc. in 2014.

== Discography ==
Albums

- One Way Ticket (2004)
- Champagne Nightmares (2011)
- Welcome to Success (2014)

SIngles

- "Orca" (2011)
- "Miami Nights" (2014)
- "Wash the Pain" (2025)
