= Hip Hop Film Festival =

Film festival

The Hip Hop Film Festival is the first film festival in the world to focus on producers, directors and writers from the global culture of Hip Hop. The Hip Hop Film Festival was founded in 2015 by CR Capers, the CEO & Founder of the Harlem Film House. The Hip Hop Film Festival has featured Master Cyphers by Academy Award-Winning Producer Bruce Cohen, Harlem Legend Dapper Dan, Actor and Entrepreneur Theo Rossi, Director Stefon Bristol and REVOLT CEO Detavio Samuels among others.

== Awards 2016 ==
Year	Winner	Award Category	Work	Ref
2016	Artie Brennan	Audience Choice Award	Snuffalafaghost: Hip Hop's First Stylist	
2016	Steve Rahaman	Best Cinematography	Snitches	

== Awards 2019 ==
Year	Winner	Award category	Work	Ref
2019	Kyvon Edwin	Best Actor	Winston	
2019	Kristopher Wedgwood	Best Cinematography	To The Madness	
2019	Martin Van Buren	Best Feature	Contents Under Pressure	
2019	Jahan Nostra & Ceschi	Best Music Video	El Chapo	
2019	Josiah DonMartin	Best Screenplay	God Bless You	
2019	Sam Diaz, et al.	Best Soundtrack	Nana’s Room	
2019	Jerod Couch	Best of Fest: Audience Choice Award	#Washed	

== Awards 2018 ==
Year	Winner	Award category	Work	Ref
2018	Patrick House, et al.	Best Feature Short	Blue Diamonds	
2018	Johnny Martini	Best Sound Design	12 Round Gun	
2018	Marcellus Cox	Best Costume Design	"Rolling in the Deep"	
