= Third Party (album) =

Studio album by Blue Sky Black Death & Alexander Chen
- Released: September 7, 2010
- Genre: Hip-hop
- Length: 44:09
- Label: Fake Four Inc.
- Producer: Blue Sky Black Death

Blue Sky Black Death chronology
Slow Burning Lights (2008)	Third Party (2010)	Noir (2011)

Professional ratings
Review scores
Source	Rating
AllMusic	3.5/5 stars
HipHopDX	3.5/5 stars
Potholes in My Blog	3.5/5 stars
Spectrum Culture	2.5/5
URB	3.5/5 stars

Third Party is a collaborative studio album by American hip-hop production duo Blue Sky Black Death and singer Alexander Chen. It was released by Fake Four Inc. in 2010.

== Critical reception ==
Rick Anderson of AllMusic gave the album 3.5 stars out of 5, saying, "The songs are desultory but strangely attractive; the singing is cold and lackluster, but oddly comforting." He added: "The overall sound is something like '80s synth pop with the turntable set at too low a speed, and it's weird and dreamy and pretty and just slightly annoying all at the same time." Trav Glave of URB said, "the vocals do a nice job of painting more sound and layering it all together."

== Track listing ==
No.	Title	Length
1.	"Carl Sagan"	4:54
2.	"Absentee"	3:58
3.	"Call to Arms"	5:21
4.	"Set Fire"	2:37
5.	"Institution"	5:57
6.	"Cynic's Cough"	4:45
7.	"Slow Years"	2:26
8.	"Rerun"	4:35
9.	"Threads of Gold"	3:29
10.	"Scandal"	6:05
