= Woke Up Alone =

Studio album by Factor Chandelier
- Released: July 23, 2013
- Genre: Hip-hop
- Length: 43:16
- Label: Fake Four Inc.
- Producer: Factor Chandelier

Factor Chandelier chronology
Lawson Graham (2010)	Woke Up Alone (2013)	Factoria (2016)

Woke Up Alone is a studio album by Canadian hip-hop producer Factor Chandelier. It was released on Fake Four Inc. in 2013.

== Critical reception ==
Professional ratings
Review scores
Source	Rating
Exclaim!	9/10
RapReviews.com	7.5/10

Thomas Quinlan of Exclaim! gave the album a 9 out of 10, saying, "Factor's production sets the mood; the music is mostly slow and sad, aside from the few moments of hope that get something a little more uplifting." Steve Juon of RapReviews.com gave the album a 7.5 out of 10 and said, "the variety of contributors to Factor's vision makes this one of his most wholly enjoyable albums".

== Track listing ==
No.	Title	Length
1.	"Woke Up Alone"	2:15
2.	"The Empire Has Fallen" (featuring Paranoid Castle)	3:35
3.	"After the Service"	1:12
4.	"Raise the Dead" (featuring Ceschi)	3:16
5.	"Alive Tomorrow" (featuring Nomad)	3:12
6.	"Stone Cold" (featuring Open Mike Eagle)	3:12
7.	"Long Hallways"	1:17
8.	"In Sickness & In Health" (featuring Onry Ozzborn)	3:01
9.	"Don't Give Up" (featuring Jeans Boots and Paranoid Castle)	3:35
10.	"Denied" (featuring Myka 9)	3:44
11.	"Devil's Call" (featuring Evil Ebeneezer)	4:16
12.	"Carry Over" (featuring Jeans Boots)	2:00
13.	"Let It Go" (featuring Astronautalis)	2:44
14.	"Give Up" (featuring Gregory Pepper and Paranoid Castle)	2:42
15.	"The Grave (Burial)"	3:15
