= Only Death Can Kill You =

Studio album by Awol One & Factor Chandelier
- Released: July 21, 2007
- Genre: Hip-hop
- Length: 31:39
- Label: Cornerstone R.A.S.
- Producer: Factor Chandelier

Awol One & Factor Chandelier chronology
Only Death Can Kill You (2007)	Owl Hours (2009)

Professional ratings
Review scores
Source	Rating
AllMusic	3.5/5 stars
Exclaim!	favorable
PopMatters	6/10 stars
RapReviews.com	5.5/10
Tiny Mix Tapes	1/5 stars

Only Death Can Kill You is the first collaborative studio album by American rapper Awol One and Canadian producer Factor Chandelier. It was released on Cornerstone R.A.S. in 2007.

== Critical reception ==
Stewart Mason of AllMusic described the album as "a hip-hop album that has a consistent mood and sound throughout instead of having to make a virtue of the jigsaw-puzzle quality that comes from the sound of too many collaborators and guest stars." Gentry Boeckel of PopMatters gave the album 6 stars out of 10, saying, "Only Death Can Kill You is the best record of Awol's career, but it could have been the record he kept trying to one-up throughout the rest of his career."

== Track listing ==
No.	Title	Length
1.	"Sunrise Sandwich"	2:43
2.	"Old Babies"	3:59
3.	"Meat Trunk"	2:40
4.	"Digital Angel" (featuring Mascaria, Gel Roc, and Ominous)	2:58
5.	"Sunday Mourning"	3:39
6.	"One More Time" (featuring Matre)	3:03
7.	"Alpha Omegatron"	3:52
8.	"Woke Up" (featuring Big Bear, 40ounce, and Royal-T)	2:56
9.	"Smokin Coffee"	3:16
10.	"Only Death"	2:36
