= Glaciers (album) =

Studio album by Blue Sky Black Death
- Released: October 1, 2013
- Genre: Instrumental hip-hop
- Length: 60:34
- Label: Fake Four Inc.
- Producer: Blue Sky Black Death

Blue Sky Black Death chronology
Noir (2011)	Glaciers (2013)

Glaciers is a studio album by American hip-hop production duo Blue Sky Black Death. It was released by Fake Four Inc. in 2013. The chopped and screwed version of the album, titled Glaciers Melted, was released in 2014.

== Production ==
Most songs of the album have runtimes over 10 minutes; the idea derives from a 13-minute song the duo made back in 2012. The album was almost entirely created using the ACID Pro 2.0 software. It features guest appearances from Child Actor, Lotte Kestner, and JMSN. The cover was designed by tattoo artist MxM (Maxime Büchi).

== Critical reception ==
Michael Scala of Prefix called it Blue Sky Black Death's "most grandiose, cumulative opus". Michael Berry of Seattle Weekly said: "While it sustains multiple listens, it's unclear whether the layers of Glaciers will endure or recede, like its icy namesake, over the years."

In the week of October 2, 2013, Spin included it on the "15 Albums You Can Hear Now" list.

== Track listing ==
Glaciers (original edition)
No.	Title	Length
1.	"I" (featuring Child Actor)	14:25
2.	"II" (featuring Child Actor)	11:29
3.	"III" (featuring Lotte Kestner)	13:27
4.	"IV" (featuring JMSN)	8:05
5.	"V"	13:08
Total length:		60:34

Glaciers Melted (digital edition)
No.	Title	Length
1.	"I (Melted)" (featuring Child Actor)	17:08
2.	"II (Melted)" (featuring Child Actor)	13:40
3.	"III (Melted)" (featuring Lotte Kestner)	15:59
4.	"IV (Melted)" (featuring JMSN)	9:37
5.	"V (Melted)"	15:37
6.	"V.I" (featuring Terra Lopez)	6:14
7.	"V.I (Melted)" (featuring Terra Lopez)	7:25
Total length:		85:40

== Personnel ==
Credits adapted from liner notes.

- Blue Sky Black Death – composition, production, recording
- Child Actor – vocals (1, 2)
- Lotte Kestner – vocals (3)
- JMSN – vocals (4)
- Maxime Büchi – cover artwork
- Michael Crigler – additional art, additional design
