= Blue Sky Black Death =

American hip-hop group

- Also known as: Blue Sky Black Death: BSBD, Torso; Ryan Maguire: Orphan, Kingston, 88 Ultra Ian Taggart: Rev. Left, Young God, Televangel
- Origin: San Francisco, California, United States
- Genres: Alternative hip-hop, trip hop
- Occupation: Producers
- Instruments: Drum machine, sampler, keyboard, synthesizer, guitar
- Years active: 2003–2017
- Labels: Fake Four Inc, Mush Records, Babygrande Records
- Members: Ryan Maguire a.k.a. “Kingston” Ian Taggart a.k.a. “Young God”

Blue Sky Black Death (abbreviated BSBD) was a production duo with ties to the San Francisco Bay Area and Seattle, Washington. It consisted of Ryan Maguire, better known by his stage name Kingston, and Ian Taggart, better known by his stage name Young God, or, later, Televangel. They are known principally for their hip-hop and instrumental music, made with a mixture of live instrumentation and sampling. Their name is "a skydiving phrase alluding to beauty and death."

== History ==
Kingston and Young God met and began collaborating on music in 2003. Young God, working under the name Rev. Left, began producing beats to rap over, but abandoned rapping and started producing exclusively around 2000. Kingston, working under the name Orphan, began his solo producing career collaborating with rapper Noah23 and the Plague Language collective (to which Young God also contributed production). Kingston contributed production to Noah23's debut album Cytoplasm Pixel in 1999, and the two collaborated closely until Jupiter Sajitarius in 2004, after which they parted ways. In the same year, Kingston worked on projects for Virtuoso's Omnipotent Records. He contributed a number of tracks to Jus Allah's scheduled Omnipotent debut, All Fates Have Changed, but the album was shelved. The tracks "Vengeance" and "Drill Sergeant" were later released on BSBD's Dirtnap mixtape, and a number of other beats recorded for the album were bootlegged on The Devil'z Rejects album Necronomicon. One Kingston beat, "Supreme (Black God's Remix)," was included on the Babygrande Records release of All Fates Have Changed in 2005.

The duo, collaborating initially under the name Torso, signed their first record deal with Mush Records in 2005 to release the label's first double-disc album. During the album's production, the duo settled on their current name. The album, A Heap of Broken Images, was released on June 23, 2006. The first disc featured twelve instrumental tracks with heavy live instrumentation, while the second disc featured nine rap collaborations made with traditional hip-hop sampling and a closing instrumental. The guests included Rob Sonic, Mike Ladd, Jus Allah, Sabac Red, Wise Intelligent, A-Plus, Pep Love, Chief Kamachi, Myka 9, Virtuoso, Awol One and Holocaust. The album received acclaim from various sources, including Vapors, Word, Mean Street, UK Hip Hop, and AllMusic, and landed the duo on URB's "Next 100." Around the same time, the duo completed a collaborative project with Ceschi entitled Deadpan Darling, which was never released due to the loss of most of the final mixes on a crashed hard drive. 16 years later, in 2021, it was announced that Deadpan Darling had recovered and was later released.

== Career ==
The acclaim received for their debut album led to the duo landing a record deal with popular independent rap label Babygrande Records later in 2006. Their first release on the label was a full-length collaboration with Holocaust, titled Blue Sky Black Death Presents: The Holocaust, released on September 5. Holocaust provided all the album's vocals with no guest appearances, and BSBD provided production for every track. The album included the duo's first 12-inch single, The Ocean / No Image. The duo's next album was a collaboration with another Wu-Tang affiliate, Sunz of Man, and Black Market Militia member Hell Razah. Their album Razah's Ladder was released on October 23, 2007. Unlike The Holocaust, the album included outside guest appearances, featuring Crooked I, Shabazz the Disciple, Ill Bill, Sabac Red, and Prodigal Sunn. The duo strayed from the dark soundscapes featured in The Holocaust, instead providing a soulful backdrop for Razah. Shortly before the release of Razah's Ladder, the duo released their first mixtape, titled Dirtnap, featuring various unreleased collaborations and two instrumentals from their forthcoming album.

The duo's next release was their first all-instrumental project, Late Night Cinema, released on April 29, 2008. The dense instrumentals featured contributions from violinists, organists, trumpeters, synth players, and vocalists, as well as in-house guitar, keyboard, and drum kit work. The album received high acclaim from XLR8R, Music-Reviewer, PopMatters, SputnikMusic and RapReviews.com. RapReviews writer Pedro Hernandez stated, "With this album, Blue Sky Black Death pushes the limits of what hip-hop music can be" and called it "essential listening." BSBD stayed active online throughout 2008, releasing two instrumental podcast blends titled Gifts in Jail Vol. 1 and Gifts in Jail Vol. 2, as well as a screwed version of Late Night Cinema titled Lean Night Cinema.

In June 2008, after an online petition from fans, Babygrande released the acclaimed instrumentals from The Holocaust on vinyl and CD. BSBD then contributed twelve of thirteen tracks for Phoenix MC Gutta's debut album Heads Will Roll, released on Babygrande on September 2. On September 30, Babygrande released the album The Evil Jeanius, by pairing Jean Grae vocals with Blue Sky Black Death beats. November saw the duo's fifth release of the year, Slow Burning Lights, an indie pop project with singer Yes Alexander, which was recorded and completed two years before its release.

Third Party, a collaboration with Alexander Chen of Boy in Static, was released on Fake Four Inc in 2010.

In 2011, Blue Sky Black Death released a new album, Noir, on Fake Four Inc. The duo also released For the Glory, a collaborative album with rapper Nacho Picasso, in the same year.

Two more collaborative albums with Nacho Picasso, Lord of the Fly and Exalted, were released in 2012. They performed at South by Southwest in March of that year.

A follow-up album with Yes Alexander entitled World Wide Romance was scheduled to be released sometime in 2013. The first single from the album Heart Attack was released in 2010.

In May 2013, BSBD released a single titled "Valley of Kings," which features Cam'ron, SAS, and N.O.R.E. This was followed by the release of their new instrumental album Glaciers on October 1, 2013.

On February 14, 2014, Blue Sky Black Death released an unofficial remix of Frank Ocean's 2012 single "Pyramids," which included a chopped and screwed sample of Pimp C's verse from UGK's 1999 single "Wood Wheel."

In January 2014, the duo returned to their roots and looked to truly realize ideas that were previously seen in their earlier works. BSBD also had cameos from other Fake Four Inc. signers, Child Actor, and JMSN, in their album Glaciers.

In December 2017, Blue Sky Black Death made a post on their official Twitter saying they were "resting eternally." In a comment, Taggart replied the group hadn't been working on a project for some time, but they were still in contact.

The Twitter account remained active after this announcement, largely run by Taggart. In February 2021, he hinted at the release of the then-unreleased Deadpan Darling collaboration with Ceschi from 16 years prior. Later that month, the single "Sorry" was released by Fake Four under the Deadpan Darling name (with credits to both Blue Sky Black Death and Ceschi), followed by a full release of the project on March 5. Later that month, Taggart also teased a forthcoming 10-year anniversary reissue of Noir.

== Discography ==
Blue Sky Black Death

- A Heap of Broken Images (Mush, 2006)
- Late Night Cinema (Babygrande, 2008)
- Noir (Fake Four, 2011)
- Glaciers (Fake Four, 2013)

Nacho Picasso & Blue Sky Black Death

- For the Glory (2011)
- Lord of the Fly (2012)
- Exalted (2012)
- Stoned & Dethroned (2015)

Other collaborations

- The Holocaust (Babygrande, 2006) (with Warcloud)
- Razah's Ladder (Babygrande, 2007) (with Hell Razah)
- The Evil Jeanius (Babygrande, 2008) (with Jean Grae)
- Slow Burning Lights (Babygrande, 2008) (with Yes Alexander)
- Third Party (Fake Four, 2010) (with Alexander Chen)
- Skull & Bones (2012) (with Bolo Nef & Caz Greez)
- Celestial (Man Bites Dog, 2016) (with S.A.S.)
- Deadpan Darling (Fake Four, 2021) (released under the Deadpan Darling name)
