= Lawson Graham =

Studio album by Factor Chandelier
- Released: May 18, 2010
- Genre: Hip-hop
- Length: 52:47
- Label: Fake Four Inc.
- Producer: Factor Chandelier

Factor Chandelier chronology
| 13 Stories (A Prelude) (2010) | Lawson Graham (2010) | Woke Up Alone (2013) |

Professional ratings
Review scores
| Source | Rating |
|---|---|
| AllMusic | 3.5/5 stars |
| Exclaim! | favorable |
| Music Vice | exceptional |
| Now | 4/5 stars |
| The Phoenix | 4/4 stars |
| Potholes in My Blog | 3/5 stars |
| Toro Magazine | 4/5 |
| Word Is Bond | favorable |

Lawson Graham is a studio album by Canadian hip-hop producer Factor Chandelier. It was released on Fake Four Inc. in 2010. It features guest appearances from Gregory Pepper, Cars & Trains, Radical Face, Sole, Myka 9, Ceschi, and Moka Only. It is an ode to Factor's grandfather.

== Critical reception ==
Rick Anderson of AllMusic gave the album 3.5 stars out of 5, saying, "it's emotionally sophisticated rap, and that really is quite unusual." Thomas Quinlan of Exclaim! said, "Lawson Graham is certainly an excellent attempt by Factor to appeal to a wider audience, which is also likely to lead to a greater range of co-conspirators he can work with in the future."

Confront Magazine named it the 2nd best album of 2010.

== Track listing ==
| No. | Title | Length |
|---|---|---|
| 1. | "Bengough Station" | 1:04 |
| 2. | "Missed the Train" (featuring Gregory Pepper) | 2:41 |
| 3. | "Ain't Nothin' Gonna Change" (featuring Barfly and Heresy Mae) | 3:23 |
| 4. | "Every Morning" (featuring Cars & Trains) | 4:16 |
| 5. | "Living in a Vacuum" (featuring Radical Face and Sole) | 3:11 |
| 6. | "Blown Away" | 0:59 |
| 7. | "Oh Oh Andy" (featuring Nomad) | 2:37 |
| 8. | "More Than Love" (featuring Kirby Dominant) | 3:59 |
| 9. | "Mental Illness" (featuring 2Mex) | 2:56 |
| 10. | "PopStravaganza" (featuring Josh Martinez) | 4:06 |
| 11. | "They Don't Know" (featuring Pigeon John) | 3:37 |
| 12. | "That's How I Feel About It" (featuring Myka 9) | 4:31 |
| 13. | "Stoned As You" | 1:46 |
| 14. | "The Fall of Captain EO" (featuring Ceschi) | 3:45 |
| 15. | "Went Away" (featuring Moka Only) | 2:48 |
| 16. | "Not What They Seem" | 1:51 |
| 17. | "Battle Scars" (featuring Def3) | 2:54 |
| 18. | "Lawson Graham" | 2:22 |
