= The Violent Blue =

Studio album by Electric President
- Released: February 23, 2010
- Genres: Electronic, indie pop
- Length: 46:08
- Label: Fake Four Inc

Electric President chronology
Sleep Well (2008)	The Violent Blue (2010)

The Violent Blue is an album by the electronic music group Electric President. Released on February 23, 2010, in the United States on the Fake Four Inc label, the album is their follow-up to Sleep Well.

Ben Cooper's original intent for the album was for it to be a collection of B-sides from the 'Sleep Well' sessions - though it ended up taking the shape of a whole record themed around the ocean. The album's title stems from Cooper's name for the sea - 'The Violent Blue'. The record also shows a change in production style for the band.

== Track listing ==
1. "The Ocean Floor" - 5:03
2. "Mr. Gone" - 3:05
3. "Safe and Sound" - 4:07
4. "Feathers" - 3:23
5. "Nightmare No. 5 or 6" - 5:47
6. "The Violent Blue" - 4:14
7. "Circles" - 4:12
8. "Elegant Disasters" - 4:30
9. "Eat Shit and Die" - 3:09
10. "All the Distant Ships" - 8:38
