= Slow Burning Lights =

2008 studio album by Blue Sky Black Death & Yes Alexander

Studio album by Blue Sky Black Death & Yes Alexander
- Released: November 11, 2008
- Genres: Dream Pop, indie pop, trip hop, downtempo
- Length: 44:05
- Label: Babygrande Records
- Producer: Blue Sky Black Death

Blue Sky Black Death chronology
The Evil Jeanius (2008)	Slow Burning Lights (2008)	Third Party (2010)

Professional ratings
Review scores
Source	Rating
PopMatters	8/10 stars
Spin	favorable

Slow Burning Lights is a collaborative studio album by American hip-hop production duo Blue Sky Black Death and singer Yes Alexander. It was released by Babygrande Records in 2008.

== Critical reception ==
Andrew Martin of PopMatters gave the album 8 stars out of 10, describing it as "a combination of dreamy textures over sometimes erratic, glitchy drums with that traditional BSBD quality that is almost impossible to categorize." Josh Modell of Spin said: "It's never as punchily trip-hoppy as Sneaker Pimps or as blatantly out-there as Joanna Newsom, but the fittingly named Slow Burning Lights sits on the same off-kilter pop continuum."

== Track listing ==
No.	Title	Length
1.	"Secrets"	4:36
2.	"Once Away"	3:34
3.	"Hot Night"	3:46
4.	"Honestly"	4:14
5.	"Stillness"	5:22
6.	"Movements"	6:49
7.	"Come Inside"	3:16
8.	"Tokyo Underground"	4:26
9.	"Pretend"	3:15
10.	"The Darkest Time"	4:54
