= The Holocaust (album) =

Studio album by Blue Sky Black Death & the Holocaust
- Released: September 5, 2006
- Genre: Hip-hop
- Length: 57:55
- Label: Babygrande Records
- Producer: Blue Sky Black Death

Blue Sky Black Death chronology
| A Heap of Broken Images (2006) | The Holocaust (2006) | Razah's Ladder (2007) |

The Holocaust chronology
| Smuggling Booze in the Graveyard (2002) | The Holocaust (2006) | Theatre of Pain (2009) |

Alternative cover
- The Holocaust Instrumentals cover

Singles from The Holocaust
- 1. "The Ocean / No Image" Released: 2006

Professional ratings
Review scores
| Source | Rating |
|---|---|
| AllMusic | favorable |

The Holocaust is a collaborative studio album by American hip-hop production duo Blue Sky Black Death and American rapper the Holocaust. It was released by Babygrande Records in 2006. Due to a fan petition to Babygrande Records, the album's instrumentals were released on June 24, 2008.

== Track listing ==
| No. | Title | Length |
|---|---|---|
| 1. | "Plunder" | 3:08 |
| 2. | "Twilight Zone" | 4:10 |
| 3. | "We Are All Well Known" | 4:52 |
| 4. | "What Can the Matter Be" | 3:22 |
| 5. | "God Be with You" | 3:52 |
| 6. | "Monarchs" | 3:05 |
| 7. | "No Image" | 6:02 |
| 8. | "The Ocean" | 3:39 |
| 9. | "Sinister" | 4:27 |
| 10. | "Smoking Room" | 3:07 |
| 11. | "Lady of the Birds" | 1:21 |
| 12. | "The Worst" | 3:23 |
| 13. | "Killer Moth" | 2:48 |
| 14. | "Wing to Wingfeather" | 3:43 |
| 15. | "Crash" | 6:55 |

== Personnel ==
Credits adapted from liner notes.

- The Holocaust – vocals
- Blue Sky Black Death – production, arrangement, recording
- Michael Sarsfield – mastering
- Nubian Image – art direction, design
- Carlos Fuentez – additional illustration
- Austin McManus – photography
- Chuck Wilson – executive production
- Jesse Stone – marketing
