= 13 Stories (A Prelude) =

Studio album by Factor Chandelier
- Released: January 12, 2010
- Genre: Hip-hop
- Length: 44:02
- Label: Side Road Records
- Producer: Factor Chandelier

Factor Chandelier chronology
Chandelier (2008)	13 Stories (A Prelude) (2010)	Lawson Graham (2010)

Professional ratings
Review scores
Source	Rating
Potholes in My Blog	3/5 stars
URB	favorable

13 Stories (A Prelude) is a studio album by Canadian hip-hop producer Factor Chandelier. It was released on Side Road Records in 2010.

== Critical reception ==
Writing for Potholes in My Blog, Zach Cole gave the album 3 stars out of 5, saying, "13 Stories is interesting in that the productions are more rooted in traditional hip-hop, and they are certainly not Factor's most abstract by any means, yet the album remains challenging — in a good way."

== Track listing ==
No.	Title	Length
1.	"Sounds Good to Me (Hip Hop)" (featuring Ellay Khule, Medusa, and Joe Dub)	3:27
2.	"Don't Jock the Dead" (featuring Awol One and Sole)	3:20
3.	"Batteries Not Included" (featuring Onry Ozzborn)	2:52
4.	"Black Fantasia" (featuring Sunspot Jonz)	5:23
5.	"Keep It on Track Now" (featuring Sleep)	2:59
6.	"Money in the Bank" (featuring Existereo)	2:45
7.	"In Through the Alley" (featuring Cam the Wizzard)	3:47
8.	"Pulling the Wings Off of Angels" (featuring Nolto)	2:39
9.	"Vicious Cycle" (featuring Icon the Mic King)	2:52
10.	"Luck Ducks" (featuring Def3)	3:00
11.	"Tell Me" (featuring Nocando)	3:20
12.	"Sinking Ship" (featuring Kay the Aquanaut)	3:12
13.	"Sacrifice" (featuring Noah23)	4:24
