= Ghost (Radical Face album) =

Studio album by Radical Face
- Released: March 2, 2007
- Genre: Indie rock, indie folk, dream pop, folktronica, post-rock, Indietronica
- Length: 47:51
- Label: Morr Music

Radical Face chronology
The Junkyard Chandelier (2003)	Ghost (2007)	The Family Tree: The Roots (2011)

Ghost is the debut studio album by the American music act Radical Face. It was released on March 2, 2007, through Morr Music.

Ghost is a concept album based on the idea of houses retaining stories of what has happened in them. Each song is a story, some told from the house's point of view. Ben Cooper cited an old house he lived in as one of the inspirations for Ghost. Most of his work on the album was done in an old tool shed behind his house. Cooper, Mark Hubbard, and Alex Kane collaborated with Emeral Cooper for some tracks on the album.

Ghost has been compared to musical acts such as Pinback, The Mountain Goats, Sufjan Stevens, The Postal Service, Gorky's Zygotic Mynci, Paul Simon, and Animal Collective.

== "Welcome Home" ==
The song "Welcome Home" has been featured in advertisements and films, including a Nikon advertisement in several countries of Europe, an advertisement for the 2011 Chevrolet Volt, and a promotional video for the University of Oregon that aired during the 2011 BCS Championship between Auburn and Oregon. The song appeared in the movie Humboldt County. It was featured in the Discovery Channel TV Series North America. The 2011 documentary film Forks Over Knives features the song over the ending credits. It is used in the climax of the film The Vicious Kind and featured in the film The Swiss Machine as speed alpine climber Ueli Steck ascends the Eiger. This film was part of the 2010 Reel Rock Tour. Steck's ascent to the tune of Radical Face's "Welcome Home" is featured in the Reel Rock Tour trailer. It was also used at the end of UK program Eddie Izzard: Marathon Man, toward the end of the first episode of the TV series Graceland, in the latter portion of the trailer for the 2012 documentary Mission to Lars and in a mountain bike short film of free-ride pro Andi Wittmann. The opening scenes of the 2015 film A Year and Change feature this song. The song was heard in the fifth season of the popular British show, Skins, the second season of James May's Man Lab, and in the eighth episode of The Blacklist's first season. The song is listened to by a character in the opening scene of the pilot episode of the TV series The Returned. The song was featured during the credits of the 2016 movie Before I Wake. The song has been used as the official theme song for the Coastal Observation and Seabird Survey Team, Marine Debris Unit. The song reached number 58 in the UK Singles Chart in July 2012. The song was used in the Corona Beer's “Protect Our Beaches” initiative with Oceanic Global]in the summer of 2021. An arrangement of the orchestral version and the third verse (“all my nightmares escaped my head…”) was used in the closing scene and end credits of the last episode of the 2025 Netflix series “Dept. Q”

== Track listing ==
No.	Title	Length
1.	"Asleep On A Train"	2:00
2.	"Welcome Home"	4:46
3.	"Let The River In"	5:06
4.	"Glory"	6:13
5.	"The Strangest Things"	4:25
6.	"Wrapped In Piano Strings"	3:37
7.	"Along The Road"	4:16
8.	"Haunted"	4:43
9.	"Winter Is Coming"	4:22
10.	"Sleepwalking"	4:41
11.	"Homesick"	3:42
