= Late Night Cinema =

Studio album by Blue Sky Black Death
- Released: April 29, 2008
- Length: 58:58
- Label: Babygrande Records
- Producer: Blue Sky Black Death

Blue Sky Black Death chronology
Razah's Ladder (2007)	Late Night Cinema (2008)	The Evil Jeanius (2008)

Professional ratings
Review scores
Source	Rating
PopMatters	8/10 stars
RapReviews	9/10
Sputnikmusic	4.5/5
XLR8R	9/10

Late Night Cinema is a studio album by American hip-hop production duo Blue Sky Black Death. It was released by Babygrande Records in 2008.

== Critical reception ==
Alan Ranta of PopMatters gave the album 8 stars out of 10, describing it as "a thorough triumph from two of hip-hop's most exciting prospects." Meanwhile, Zoneil Maharaj of XLR8R gave the album a 9 out of 10, calling it "a dark yet beautiful soundscape with heavy classical overtones and lush drops that commands listeners' attention, navigating us through various moods."

Quentin B. Huff of PopMatters named it the 2nd best instrumental hip-hop album of 2008.

== Track listing ==
No.	Title	Length
1.	"The Era When We Sang"	6:01
2.	"Lord of Our Vice"	6:40
3.	"Ghosts Among Men"	7:31
4.	"A Private Death"	6:28
5.	"Shoot You Dead"	5:17
6.	"Listen Child"	5:36
7.	"My Work Will Be Done"	4:37
8.	"Forgive Me"	4:48
9.	"Different Hours"	4:10
10.	"All the News Is Bad Again"	4:55
11.	"Legacy to Fuel"	2:50

== Personnel ==
Credits adapted from liner notes.

- Blue Sky Black Death – instrumentation
- C.T. Thompson – vocals (1, 7, 9, 10)
- Ashley Wise – vocals (3, 8)
- Yes Alexander – vocals (5)
- Valerie Coon – violin (1, 3, 5, 10)
- Nancey Kuo – violin (3, 4, 5, 8)
- Tony Rogers – trumpet (3, 4, 6, 8)
- Evan Gordon – organ (3, 4, 6, 7, 8), synthesizer (3, 4, 6, 7, 8)
- Mark Christensen – mastering
- Michael Tabie – photo collage, design
- Debbie Carlos – original background photography
- Jesse Stone – marketing
- Willy Friedman – product management
