= Get Dead =

American punk rock band

- Origin: San Francisco, California, U.S.
- Genres: Punk rock; Skate punk; Street punk; Folk punk
- Years active: 2007–present
- Labels: Horns Up Records; Fat Wreck Chords
- Members: Sam King; Tim Mehew; Mike McGuire; Scott Powell; Kyle Santos
- Past members: Josh Garcia; JP Mangano; David 'Moki' Marino; Jeremy Korkki
- Website: www.getdeadmusic.com

Get Dead is an American punk rock band from San Francisco Bay Area, California. They were formed in 2007 and were soon noticed by Fat Mike of NOFX and signed to his label, Fat Wreck Chords.

== History ==
Get Dead released Bad News in 2013, their debut album for Fat Wreck Chords.

Their second full-length album for Fat Wreck Chords, Honesty Lives Elsewhere, was released in 2016 and featured guest appearances by members of label-mate bands Lagwagon, toyGuitar and Old Man Markley.

In early 2019 the band revealed that they were recording their first album since 2016.

Anarchist art collective Indecline used a Get Dead cover of "I Wanna Be Your Dog" by The Stooges for their project entitled "Hate Breed" which was described by Rolling Stone as "20 white men donned T-shirts, MAGA hats and custom collars and were paraded down the Hollywood Walk of Fame by people of color and members of the queer community."

In 2020 the band released Dancing With The Curse.

== Band members ==
Current members

- Sam King - lead vocals
- Tim Mehew - bass, vocals
- Mike McGuire - guitar, vocals
- Scott Powell - drums, bellpepper
- Kyle Santos - guitar

Former members

- Josh Garcia - drums, percussion, engineer, producer (All Get Dead releases)
- David 'Moki' Marino - guitar, vocals (Forged In The Furnace of Rad, Tall Cans And Loose Ends, Bad News, Bygones, Honesty Lives Elsewhere)
- JP Mangano - guitar, vocals (Letters Home, Self Titled EP)
- Jeremy Korkki - guitar, vocals
