= A Heap of Broken Images =

Studio album by Blue Sky Black Death
- Released: May 23, 2006
- Length: 44:44 (Disc one), 46:20 (Disc two)
- Label: Mush Records
- Producer: Blue Sky Black Death

Blue Sky Black Death chronology
A Heap of Broken Images (2006)	The Holocaust (2006)

Professional ratings
Review scores
Source	Rating
AllMusic	3/5 stars
Cyclic Defrost	favorable
Exclaim!	mixed
Exclaim!	mixed
PopMatters	6/10 stars
Tiny Mix Tapes	3.5/5 stars
UKHH.com	favorable

A Heap of Broken Images is the debut studio album by American hip-hop production duo Blue Sky Black Death. It was released by Mush Records in 2006.

The album title comes from the T. S. Eliot poem The Waste Land ("A heap of broken images, where the sun beats, and the dead tree gives no shelter, the cricket no relief").

== Track listing ==
Disc one
No.	Title	Length
1.	"Skies Open"	4:33
2.	"Days Are Years"	6:02
3.	"Chloroform"	3:34
4.	"Not Here"	4:34
5.	"They Came Around"	3:20
6.	"Dream of Dying"	5:04
7.	"From Sun's Angle"	3:33
8.	"Rap Creature Land"	3:34
9.	"Heroin for God"	4:33
10.	"Guilty Ones"	1:14
11.	"The Dead Tree Gives No Shelter"	2:39
12.	"Still Asleep"	2:01

Disc two
No.	Title	Length
1.	"Engage My Words" (featuring Jus Allah, Wise Intelligent, and Sabac Red)	4:08
2.	"Street Legends" (featuring A-Plus and Pep Love)	4:21
3.	"Floor Chalk (Best Reprise)" (featuring Guru and Chief Kamachi)	3:33
4.	"Scriptures" (featuring Lil' Sci)	4:37
5.	"Long Division" (featuring Rob Sonic and Mike Ladd)	6:41
6.	"I Catch Fire" (featuring Holocaust)	6:24
7.	"Grimey Styles" (featuring Myka 9)	4:19
8.	"Brain Cells" (featuring Virtuoso)	4:09
9.	"Everything" (featuring Awol One)	6:01
10.	"It Wasn't White"	2:06
