= Factor Chandelier =

- Also known as: Factor, DJ Factor, Factor G, Gram
- Born: Graham Murawsky; March 28, 1982 (age 44); Saskatoon, Saskatchewan, Canada
- Genres: Alternative hip-hop, instrumental hip-hop, underground hip-hop
- Occupation: Producer
- Years active: 1998–present
- Labels: Fake Four Inc. Side Road Records; Off Beat Production; Urbnet Records
- Website: www.factorchandelier.com

Graham Murawsky (born March 28, 1982), better known by his stage name Factor Chandelier (formerly Factor), is a Canadian underground hip-hop producer from Saskatoon, Saskatchewan. He is a founder of Off Beat Production and Side Road Records.

== History ==
In 2009, Factor produced Freestyle Fellowship member Myka 9's solo album 1969. It features guest appearances from Aceyalone, Busdriver, Awol One and Gel Roc. In promotion of the album, Factor toured across the United States with Myka 9, Sole, and Ceschi Ramos.

In 2010, Factor released the solo album Lawson Graham and The Great Depression, a collaborative album with Gregory Pepper as Common Grackle, both on Fake Four Inc.

== Discography ==
=== Albums ===
Solo
- Time Invested (Off Beat Production, 2002)
- Con-Soul Confessions (Off Beat Production, 2003)
- Three (Side Road, 2003)
- Heights (Side Road, 2005)
- Famous Nights and Empty Days (Side Road, 2006)
- Chandelier (Fake Four, 2008)
- 13 Stories (A Prelude) (Side Road, 2010)
- Lawson Graham (Fake Four, 2010)
- Woke Up Alone (Fake Four, 2013)
- Singles Series (Side Road, 2015)
- Factoria (Fake Four, 2016)
- Wisdom Teeth (Side Road, 2018)
- First Storm (Side Road, 2020)
- Eastlake (Fake Four, 2020)
- Time Invested II (Fake Four, 2022)
- Moving Like a Planet (Fake Four, 2023)

with Kay the Aquanaut
- Deep Rooted (Off Beat Production, 2002)
- Solitude Savannah (Off Beat Production, 2002)
- Waist Deep in Concrete (Side Road, 2004)
- Spinning Blue Planet (Side Road, 2007)
- Letters from Laika (Circle Into Square, 2013)
- 7 Vessels (Fake Four, 2017)
- New Physics (Side Road, 2024)

with Nolto
- All Over the Right Here (Side Road, 2004)
- Red All Over (Side Road, 2005)
- Scott Free... Red Handed (Side Road, 2014)

with Kirby Dominant (as Paranoid Castle)
- One Way Ticket (Side Road, 2004)
- Champagne Nightmares (Fake Four, 2011)
- Welcome to Success (Fake Four, 2014)

with Awol One
- Only Death Can Kill You (Cornerstone R.A.S., 2007)
- Owl Hours (Fake Four, 2009)
- The Landmark (Fake Four, 2011)

with Myka 9
- 1969 (Fake Four, 2009)
- Sovereign Soul (Fake Four, 2012)
- Famous Future Time Travel (Urbnet, 2015)

with Ben.e Elim
- Salvation (Side Road, 2004)
- With Pain Comes Pleasure (Side Road, 2006) (as Ben.e.Factor)

with Def3
- Drumbo (Side Road, 2009)
- Wildlif3 (Urbnet, 2014)

with Gregory Pepper (as Common Grackle)
- The Great Depression (Fake Four, 2010)
- Old Dog New Tricks Who This (Fake Four, 2021)

with Ceschi
- Broken Bone Ballads (Fake Four, 2015)
- Sad, Fat Luck (Fake Four, 2019)

Other full-length collaborations
- Take a Look Inside (Clothes Horse, 2001) (with Chaps & Forgetful Jones, as CF Crew)
- For the Rest of My Life (Side Road, 2004) (with Cam the Wizzard)
- Livin la Vida Boo Hoo (Side Road, 2005) (with Candy's .22)
- Cafeteria Food (Side Road, 2005) (with Ira Lee)
- Dawn of a New Era (Side Road, 2005) (with Akuma)
- No Phukkin Clu (Medici State, 2006) (with NoBS Allowed)
- Metropolis Now (Side Road, 2006) (with Def3, Forgetful Jones & Kay the Aquanaut, as Metropolis Now)
- Live in 75 (Side Road, 2007) (with Joe Dub)
- Deepcave and Factor (Deepcave, 2008) (with Deepcave)
- 46 Middles (Side Road, 2008) (with Azrael, Chadio, Kaboom & The Gumshoe Strut, as 50 Fingers)
- Screwg McDovey (Side Road, 2010) (with D.Dove)
- Saffron (Fake Four, 2010) (with Ron Contour)
- Party Til Your Body Stops (Side Road, 2010) (with Cam the Wizzard & Giovanni Marks, as Cam, Gram & G.A.M.)
- All That's Left (Urbnet, 2015) (with Evil Ebenezer)

=== EPs ===
Solo
- Club Soda Series 1 (Side Road, 2011)
- Factor and the Chandeliers (Fake Four Inc., 2011)
- Club Soda Series 2 (Side Road, 2012)

Collaborations
- A Homemade Effort (2002) (with Comma Concept & Nolto, as A Homemade Effort)
- 3 Days Later... (2002) (with M.Phasis)
- Widows Creek (Side Road, 2011) (with Evil Ebenezer)
- Pangaean Drift (Circle Into Square, 2012) (with Kay the Aquanaut, as Laika)
- Crossroads EP (Fake Four Inc., 2015) (with Awol One)
- Tinted Skyscraper (2017) (with Evil Ebenezer)
- Who the Crown Fits (2018) (with Matre)
- Kill Factory (2020) (with Dope KNife)
- Voyager (2020) (with LOGS)
- People Into Making Progress (2020) (with Myka 9)

=== Compilations, mixtapes and promos ===
- Side Road and Friends: B-Sides and Unreleased Hits (Side Road, 2005)
- After the Fact (Hue, 2006)
- The Trip Beyond (2007) (with The Gaff)
- The Chandelier EP [promo] (Ooohh! That's Heavy, 2008)
- Old Souls Vol. 1 (Side Road, 2009)
- Old Souls Vol. 2 (Side Road, 2010)
- Old Souls Vol. 3 (Side Road, 2012)
- Singles Series Jan-Apr [EP] (Side Road, 2014)
- Singles Series (Side Road, 2015)
- Years (2009-2019) (Side Road, 2019) (with Myka 9)

=== Production credits ===
- Kirby Dominant - "The Intermission Factor" from Starr: The Contemplations of a Dominator (2006)
- Awol One - "Speakers To The Sneakers" & "Happy Hour" from Afterbirth (2007)
- Def3 & Moka Only - "What Now!" from Dog River (2007)
- Epic - "The City (Factor Mix)" from Aging Is What Friends Do Together (2008)
- Mestizo - "Duke Ellington" from U May Not Heard This (2008)
- Noah23 - "True Romance" from Rock Paper Scissors (2008)
- Epic - "Out of the Loop" from Scarf Face (2009)
- Kay the Aquanaut - "Who Needs Enemies?", "Roll Call", "1869", "The Circus Is Coming", "Action", "Next Stop, Jupiter!", "Nickel and Dime", "Paris of the Prairies" & "First and Fifteen" from Nickelodeon Ethics (2009)
- Ira Lee - "I Love My Mom" from My Favorite Songs by Me (2010)
- Kay the Aquanaut - "Kill You" & "Glass Slipper" from Waterloo (2011)
- Noah23 - "Bed Bugs" from Fry Cook on Venus (2011)
- Noah23 - "Electric Furs of a Lynx" & "Sacrifice" from Pirate Utopias (77 Lost Scrolls) (2011)
- VA - "J-A-P-A-N" & "No Easy Way To Grow" from J-A-P-A-N: A Fake Four Inc. Japan Relief Benefit EP (2011)
- Noah23 - "Bed Bugs" & "Sacrifice" from Noah23 for Dummies (2012)
- RationaL - "Maybe Tomorrow" from The BirthWrite LP (2012)
- Sole - "Young Sole" from A Ruthless Criticism of Everything Existing (2012)
- Time - "Black and Gold" from Newstalgia (2013)
- Noah23 - "High" from Rare Gems (2014)
- Cquel - "Walk" from "Never Enough" (2016)
- Cquel - "Death Of Me" from "Never Enough" (2016)
