= S/T (Electric President album) =

Studio album by Electric President
- Released: January 24, 2006
- Recorded: October 2004 – May 2005
- Genre: Electronic, indie pop
- Length: 46:18
- Label: Morr Music

Electric President chronology
S/T (2006)	Sleep Well (2008)

S/T is the pseudo-eponymous album by the electronic music group Electric President. Released in January 2006, on the Morr Music label, the album is their first full-length record.

Two music videos were created for the tracks "Insomnia" and "Grand Machine No. 12". "Insomnia" was also featured during the closing sequence of an episode of the Fox Network show, The OC.

A recurring theme on this record is a description of an automated, inhuman society.

== Track listing ==
1. "Good Morning, Hypocrite" – 5:21
2. "Insomnia" – 4:13
3. "Ten Thousand Lines" – 5:32
4. "Grand Machine No. 12" – 3:59
5. "Hum" – 2:16
6. "Snow on Dead Neighborhoods" – 3:24
7. "Some Crap About the Future" – 5:02
8. "Metal Fingers" – 3:48
9. "We Were Never Built to Last" – 4:25
10. "Farewell" – 7:55
