= Sleep Well =

Studio album by Electric President
- Released: June 6, 2008
- Genres: Electronic, indie pop
- Length: 52:30
- Label: Morr Music

Electric President chronology
S/T (2006)	Sleep Well (2008)	The Violent Blue (2010)

Professional ratings
Review scores
Source	Rating
AllMusic	3.5/5 stars
Exclaim!	favorable
PopMatters	6/10 stars

Sleep Well is a studio album by American electronic music group Electric President. Released in 2008 on the Morr Music label, it is a follow-up to the group's 2006 debut album, S/T.

== Track listing ==
No.	Title	Length
1.	"Monsters"	4:36
2.	"Bright Mouths"	4:47
3.	"We Will Walk Through Walls"	4:31
4.	"Graves and the Infinite Arm"	4:39
5.	"Adrift in Space, or Whatever"	1:19
6.	"Ether"	5:10
7.	"Robophobia"	4:34
8.	"Lullaby"	5:36
9.	"It's Like a Heartbeat, Only It Isn't"	1:01
10.	"All the Bones"	5:15
11.	"It's an Ugly Life"	5:51
12.	"When It's Black"	5:11
