= The Evil Jeanius =

Studio album by Blue Sky Black Death & Jean Grae
- Released: September 30, 2008
- Genre: Hip-hop, indie rap, R&B, pop rap
- Length: 37:26
- Label: Babygrande Records
- Producer: Blue Sky Black Death

Blue Sky Black Death chronology
Late Night Cinema (2008)	The Evil Jeanius (2008)	Slow Burning Lights (2008)

Jean Grae chronology
Jeanius (2008)	The Evil Jeanius (2008)	Everything's Fine (2018)

The Evil Jeanius is a collaborative studio album by American hip hop production duo Blue Sky Black Death and American rapper Jean Grae. It was released by Babygrande Records on September 30, 2008.

The album was controversial because Babygrande took Jean Grae's vocals without her permission and she was largely unaware of the project until it was announced. Years later, Jean Grae responded to a question about the album by writing, "It was a shit thing to do. Fuck babygrande."

== Critical reception ==
Professional ratings
Review scores
Source	Rating
HipHopDX	4/5 stars
RapReviews.com	7.5/10
URB	4/5 stars
Beats Per Millennium	8.1/10
Chop Shop	4/5 stars

Ben Meredith of URB gave the album 4 stars out of 5, calling it "a powerful hip-hop album, extraordinarily eclectic, and a real treat from the Jean Grae/Blue Sky Black Death collaboration."

== Track listing ==
No.	Title	Length
1.	"Shadows Forever"	3:37
2.	"Ahead of the Game" (featuring Blacastan)	4:05
3.	"Strikes"	4:00
4.	"Threats" (featuring Chen Lo)	4:06
5.	"Away with Me"	3:51
6.	"Even on Your Best Day"	3:23
7.	"Take It Back"	3:00
8.	"Lights Out"	3:33
9.	"Nobody'll Do It for You"	2:53
10.	"It's Still a Love Song"	5:04

== Personnel ==
Credits adapted from liner notes.

- Jean Grae – vocals
- Blue Sky Black Death – production
- Blacastan – vocals (2)
- Chen Lo – vocals (4)
- MadAdam – turntables (2, 4, 9)
- Bladerunner – keyboards (10)
- Mark Christensen – mastering
- Charles Wilson, Jr. – executive production
- Ruddy Rock – executive production
- Ben Dotson – product management
- Willy Friedman – product management
- Jesse Stone – marketing
