= Kay the Aquanaut =

Canadian alternative rapper

- Also known as: Kay the Aquanaut
- Born: Kristian Powlowski; Saskatoon, Saskatchewan, Canada
- Origin: Saskatoon, Saskatchewan, Canada
- Genres: Alternative hip-hop, political hip-hop, underground hip-hop
- Occupation: Rapper
- Years active: 1999–present
- Labels: Circle Into Square; Side Road Records; Phonographique; Off Beat Production
- Website: Official Facebook

Kristian Powlowski, better known by his stage name Kay the Aquanaut, is a Canadian alternative hip-hop artist from Saskatoon, Saskatchewan. He has released nine albums and has toured internationally. Several of Kay the Aquanaut's albums have been produced by Factor Chandelier, and he has made appearances on Factor's own albums.

Kay the Aquanaut is also a member of the band Reform Party, who began in 2011 by covering Rage Against the Machine songs before developing original material. In 2011, Kay the Aquanaut toured Europe with Noah23 on the "Water on Venus" tour, in support of their albums Waterloo and Fry Cook on Venus, which were released on sister labels Circle Into Square and Fake Four Inc. respectively.

== Discography ==
Solo albums (with collaborating producers)

- Day Dreamin' (2001)
- Deep Rooted (2002) (with Factor)
- Solitude Savannah (Off Beat, 2002) (with Factor)
- Waist Deep in Concrete (Side Road, 2004) (with Factor)
- Spinning Blue Planet (Side Road, 2007) (with Factor)
- Nickelodeon Ethics (Side Road, 2009)
- Waterloo (Circle Into Square, 2011)
- Letters from Laika (Circle Into Square, 2013) (with Factor)
- Station Wagon (Side Road, 2016) (with Maki)
- 7 Vessels (Fake Four Inc., 2017) (with Factor Chandelier)
- Yeah, Riot!!! (self-released, 2017) (with Maki)
- Earth Station 7 (Hello L.A., 2019) (with Maki)
- The Nautical Blue (Hello L.A., 2020) (with Maki)
- Ancient Fish From the Northwest (Hello L.A., 2020) (with Kitz Willman)
- Before the Dog, After Humanity (Rhymethink, 2023) (with Cee Reality)
- New Physics (Side Road, 2024) (with Factor Chandelier)

Collaboration albums

- Submerged M.Seas (1999) (with Devotea & Vizion, as Submerged M.Seas)
- Metropolis Now (Side Road, 2006) (with Def3, Factor & Forgetful Jones, as Metropolis Now)

Mixtapes

- 40ORBITS (2021)

EPs

- Solid Soul (1999)
- ASR Chronicles (2005)
- We Sold Our Clothes to the State (Circle Into Square, 2011) (with Zoën)
- Reform Part 3P (2011) (with Levi Soulodre, Enver Hampton & Tallus Scott, as Reform Party)
- Pangaean Drift (Circle Into Square, 2012) (with Factor, as Laika)
- Perpetual Motion of the Modern Man (2012) (with Levi Soulodre, Enver Hampton & Tallus Scott, as Reform Party)
