= Radical Face =

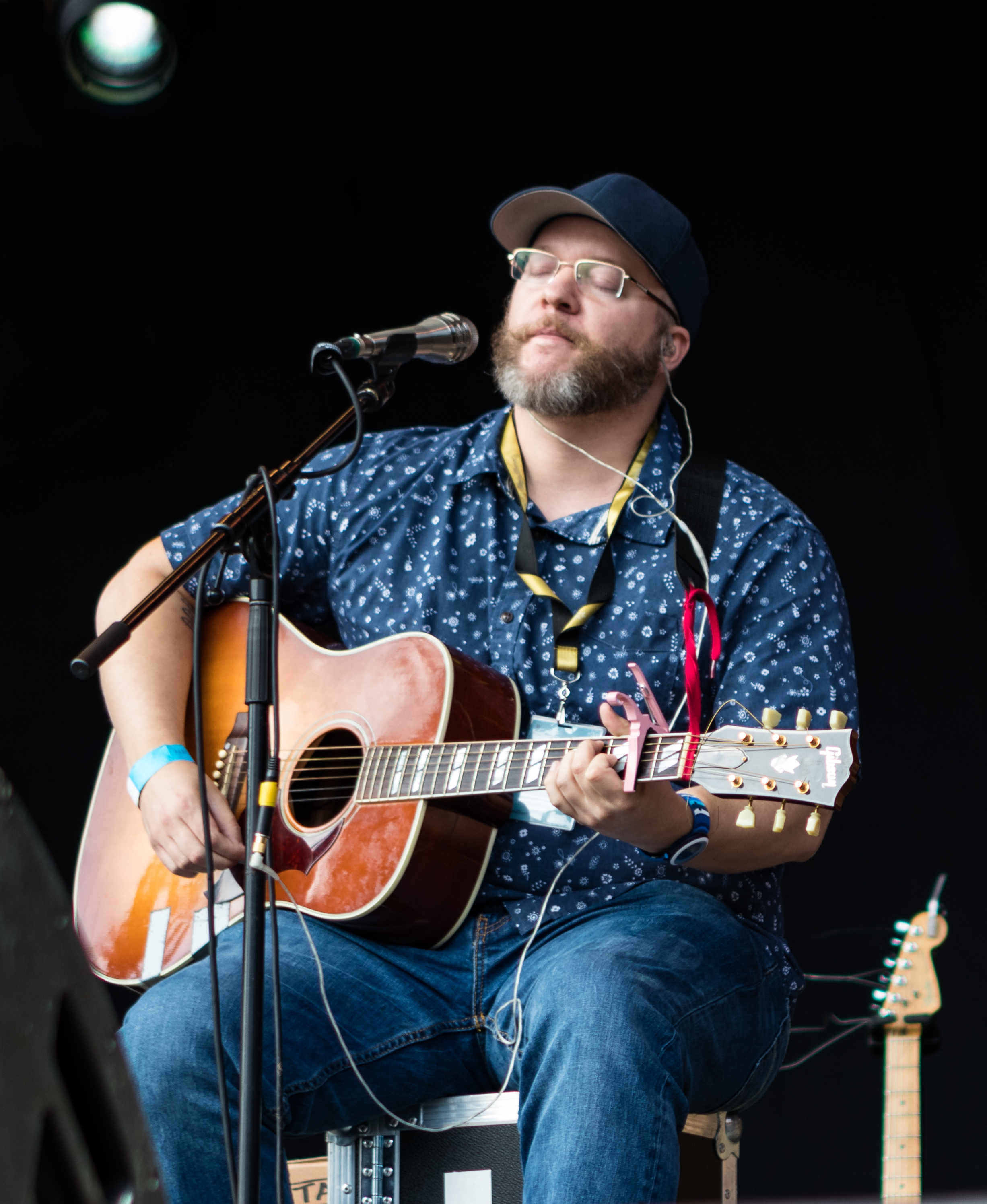
- Radical Face at Haldern Pop Festival 2017.

Background information
- Born: Jacksonville, Florida
- Origin: Jacksonville, Florida
- Genres: Folk, electronic
- Occupations: Singer, songwriter
- Years active: 2000–present
- Labels: Bear Machine Records, Nettwerk Music Group
- Website: www.radicalface.com

Radical Face is a musical act whose main member is Ben Cooper.

== History ==
=== 2003–2010: Early years ===
Cooper chose the name Radical Face upon seeing it on a flyer. He later learned it was a plastic surgery flyer for a 'Radical Face-Lift' with the word 'lift' ripped off.

Cooper's first album to be recorded under the Radical Face pseudonym was The Junkyard Chandelier (2003). The album was never formally released but has since been available as a free download online. Ghost, released in 2007, was the first official studio album by Radical Face.

=== 2010–2016: The Family Tree ===
On November 16, 2010, Cooper released a six-track EP titled Touch The Sky, which served as a prelude for an announced trilogy of albums called The Family Tree.

The Family Tree albums follows four generations of the fictional Northcote family, and is narratively based in the 19th and early 20th centuries. Comprising over 30 songs, the trilogy details the lives of an extensive list of family members as they confront war, death, progress, and the supernatural abilities certain family lines possess. Cooper uses different instruments to represent certain family members throughout the trilogy, utilizing only instruments that would have been available at the time the stories take place.

The first entry in the series, The Roots, was officially released on October 4, 2011; however it was accidentally released to users outside of the US on iTunes in August. It was followed by The Branches in October 2013, and The Leaves in March of 2016.

Leading up to the release of The Roots, the first of four EPs of songs that did not make the final cut on the main albums called The Bastards: Volume One was released track by track. The Bastards: Volume Two was released in 2013, following the release of The Branches, and volumes three and four were released in 2015, prior to the release of The Leaves in 2016.

=== 2016–2023: Missing Film and EPs ===
The sixth Radical Face album, Missing Film, was released in 2018. The album is fully instrumental, and was released under an open license with the intention for the songs to be used by independent filmmakers without the need for paying royalties.

Since 2017 Radical Face has released a number of EPs, the first being SunnMoonnEclippse, released February 10. The EP's full video is available on a website of the same name.

Starting in August 2020, Cooper released a monthly mailer named "Hidden Hollow". A new song was included with each letter. The last letter posted in February 2021, and the six songs were released as the “Hidden Hollow, Vol. 1 EP.”

=== 2023-present: A Light in the Woods ===
A Light in the Woods is a multimedia project that, according to Cooper, seeks to combine music, writing, and visual art into a semi-animated fairy tale. Through the format of a narrated story with accompanying art, a score, and several songs, Cooper seeks to explore fears and existential questions about life. Since 2018, when Cooper first began working on the project, it has grown to encompass unique worldbuilding and characters whose stories are told explicitly through narration and songs. Once completed, the story will consist of 28 songs, over 50 pieces of score, and around 1000 animated paintings, split over six 40-50 minute long videos called books.

The story is set in a fictional world where a species called the walking wood, beings born from the acorns of great trees, resides. They live within secluded villages where the residents rarely, if ever, leave the confines of the village walls. The main character, Vagus, is one such walking wood who, unlike the rest of his village, is not content with staying put. After experiencing a mysterious dream calling upon him to explore what lies beyond his village, he ventures out on a perilous journey into the mysterious woods surrounding it.

The first book called Hidden Hollow, including three songs, was released on October 20, 2023. The songs were also released separately from the story at the same time.

== In popular culture ==
The single "Welcome Home" has been featured in a number of ads, TV shows, and films. It was used as theme in Nikon's worldwide campaign "I'M NIKON".

The song "We're On Our Way" was used for the official trailer of the 2012 motion picture The Perks of Being a Wallflower.

Several songs from The Family Tree Albums have been used in films and commercials:

- "The Mute" was featured in the soundtrack of the 2014 comedy-drama Wish I Was Here
- "The Crooked Kind" is featured in the Elementary episode "The Diabolical Kind"
- "Ghost Towns" is featured in the Into the Night season 2 finale "Asil".
- "The Gilded Hand" is featured in the Criminal Minds episode "Burn" and in the Bones episode "The Conspiracy in the Corpse".
- "Glory" and "All is Well (Goodbye, Goodbye)" were featured in the 2016 motion picture Buddymoon
- "The Road to Nowhere" was featured in a 2021 commercial for Google

The American crime thriller television series The Blacklist featured the songs "Welcome Home", "Baptisms", "Always Gold", "The Road to Nowhere", "Summer Skeletons", and "Letters Home." In 2021, Radical Face released the song "One Last Dream," composed for the season 8 finale of the show.

== Discography ==
=== Albums ===
Title	Year	Track listing
The Junkyard Chandelier	2003	1. "Stitches In My Side" - 3:27; 2. "The Scarecrows Are Marching" - 4:51; 3. "Martyr" - 3:47; 4. "Chewing Bottles" - 5:14; 5. "Junkyard Chandelier" - 6:18; 6. "Paper Birds" - 4:24; 7. "Fog In The House Of Lightbulbs" - 6:43; 8. "Runs In The Sidewalk" - 5:36; 9. "Confidants And Fish Hooks" - 4:59; 10. "Pockets Full Of Ink" - 5:21; 11. "Burning Bridges" - 3:13
Ghost	2007	1. "Asleep On A Train" - 2:00; 2. "Welcome Home" - 4:45; 3. "Let The River In" - 5:05; 4. "Glory" - 6:14; 5. "The Strangest Things" - 4:25; 6. "Wrapped In Piano Strings" - 3:37; 7. "Along The Road" - 4:13; 8. "Haunted" - 4:43; 9. "Winter Is Coming" - 4:20; 10. "Sleepwalking" - 4:43; 11. "Homesick" - 3:39
The Family Tree: The Roots	2011	1. "Names" - 1:15; 2. "A Pound of Flesh" - 3:35; 3. "Family Portrait" - 4:40; 4. "Black Eyes" - 4:44; 5. "Severus and Stone" - 4:28; 6. "The Moon Is Down" - 3:18; 7. "Ghost Towns" - 3:54; 8. "Kin" - 4:04; 9. "The Dead Waltz" - 5:23; 10. "Always Gold" - 5:56; 11. "Mountains" - 4:51
The Family Tree: The Branches	2013	1. "Gray Skies" - 0:43; 2. "Holy Branches" - 3:38; 3. "The Mute" - 3:56; 4. "Reminders" - 3:34; 5. "Summer Skeletons" - 4:51; 6. "The Crooked Kind" - 4:39; 7. "Chains" - 2:11; 8. "Letters Home" - 4:12; 9. "From The Mouth Of An Injured Head" - 4:04; 10. "Southern Snow" - 3:21; 11. "The Gilded Hand" - 6:15; 12. "We All Go The Same" - 3:31
The Family Tree: The Bastards	2015	1. "Sisters" - 3:48; 2. "Baptisms" - 2:56; 3. "Servants And Kings" - 4:29; 4. "All Is Well (It's Only Blood)" - 2:44; 5. "All Is Well (Goodbye, Goodbye)" - 4:05; 6. "Second Family Portrait" - 4:55; 7. "Letters Home (Aftermath)" - 1:17; 8. "We're On Our Way" - 4:07; 9. "West" - 4:49; 10. "Small Hands" - 3:08; 11. "Nightclothes" - 6:54
The Family Tree: The Leaves	2016	1. "Secrets (Cellar Door)" - 4:26; 2. "Rivers in the Dust" - 5:45; 3. "Everything Costs" - 3:42; 4. "Midnight" - 3:10; 5. "The Ship in Port" - 3:43; 6. "Photograph" - 2:24; 7. "Third Family Portrait" - 3:45; 8. "The Road to Nowhere" - 4:46; 9. "Old Gemini" - 4:15; 10. "Bad Blood" - 4:51
Missing Film	2018	1. "Ashes" - 2:06; 2. "I'll Be There Soon" - 2:16; 3. "Ashes In The Wind" - 2:56; 4. "Home Movies" - 3:49; 5. "Hearsay" - 0:52; 6. "Tension" - 2:11; 7. "Leaving The Ground" - 2:17; 8. "Waltzing In The Ashes" - 2:09; 9. "Hunted" - 1:17; 10. "The Lost Garden" - 1:50; 11. "We All Fall Down" - 2:31; 12. "Horizon Lines" - 5:06
Ghost (Anniversary Edition)	2019	1. "Asleep On a Train (Remastered)" - 2:01; 2. "Welcome Home (Remastered)" - 4:46; 3. "Let the River In (Remastered)" - 5:05; 4. "Glory (Remastered)" - 6:11; 5. "The Strangest Things (Remastered)" - 4:24; 6. "Wrapped in Piano Strings (Remastered)" - 3:37; 7. "Along the Road (Remastered)" - 4:16; 8. "Haunted (Remastered)" - 4:43; 9. "Winter is Coming (Remastered)" - 4:22; 10. "Sleepwalking (Remastered)" - 4:41; 11. "Homesick (Remastered)" - 3:43; 12. "Asleep On a Train (Strings)" - 1:28; 13. "Glory (Live)" - 4:30; 14. "Let the River In (Instrumental)" - 2:05; 15. "Wrapped in Piano Strings (Live)" - 3:35; 16. "Haunted (Instrumental)" - 2:31; 17. "Along the Road (Live)" - 5:11; 18. "Asleep On a Train (Piano)" - 2:09; 19. "Welcome Home (Orchestral)" - 4:03; 20. "Sleepwalking (Acoustic)" - 3:49; 21. "The Strangest Things (Music Box)" - 1:54; 22. "Winter is Coming (Live)" - 4:35; 23. "Homesick (Piano)" - 3:37
B-Sides and Rarities (2002 - 2011)	2024	1. "Tall Tale No. 5" - 3:58; 2. "Mind Ur Manners" - 4:00; 3. "Home" - 6:22; 4. "Body Song" - 2:12; 5. "Mathematics" - 3:14; 6. "Strange Organism" - 2:16; 7. "The Voice of Our Age" - 3:44; 8. "The Coldest Hands" - 3:24; 9. "Elephant" - 3:03; 10. "The Emperor Has No Bones" - 3:08; 11. "If You Come Back To Haunt Me" - 6:22; 12. "Welcome Home (Early Demo)" - 2:07
Mixtape	2024	1. "Lovesong" - 4:03; 2. "Save and Sound" - 3:58; 3. "See It Through" - 4:09; 4. "Endless Summoner" - 3:38; 5. "Shipwrecks" - 3:02; 6. "Kids Are Mean" - 4:06; 7. "I'm a Good Listener" - 2:06; 8. "Gymnopodie No. 1" - 3:05; 9. "Teenage Feelings" - 3:17; 10. "Latin For Joy" - 2:53; 11. "See You On The Other Side" - 3:53
Mixtape #2	2025	1. "From Time to Time" - 4:35; 2. "Aftermath" - 4:16; 3. "Ursa Major" - 4:20; 4. "Ursa Minor" - 7:00; 5. "Givers and Takers" - 4:27; 6. "Garmonbozia" - 4:42; 7. "Jaws of Life" - 4:11; 8. "Glass Jaw" - 4:19; 9. "Dreamcatcher" - 4:09; 10. "Phantom Limb" - 5:55

=== EPs ===
Title	Year	Track listing
Touch The Sky EP	2010	1. "Welcome Home (EP Version) - 4:47; 2. "Glory (Acoustic)" - 4:34; 3. "Doorways" - 3:00; 4. "A Little Hell" - 2:13; 5. "The Deserter's Song" - 4:55; 6. "Welcome Home (Reprise)" - 2:29
Always Gold EP	2012	1. "Always Gold (Short Attention Span Mix)" - 4:04; 2. "Echoes" - 3:54; 3. "Wandering (Alternative Mix)" - 3:46; 4. "Always Gold (Acoustic)" - 3:38; 5. "We're On Our Way" - 4:07; 6. "Always Gold (Album Version)" - 5:55
SunnMoonnEclippse	2017	1. "Sunn" - 4:15; 2. "Moonn" - 4:14; 3. "Eclippse" - 6:54
Covers, Volume 1: "Lady Covers"	2018	1. "Jolene" - 3:25; 2. "Ode to My Family" - 4:32; 3. "The Goonies "R" Good Enough" - 2:59; 4. "Video Games" - 3:27; 5. "Nothing Compares 2 U" - 4:07; 6. "Memory" - 6:06
Therapy	2019	1. "Doubt" - 3:28; 2. "Hard of Hearing" - 3:10; 3. "Personal Giants" - 3:52; 4. "Guilt" - 3:32; 5. "Better Days" - 2:35; 6. "Dead Ends" - 4:24
Therapy (Alternate Reality Versions)	2019	1. "Doubt" (Alternate Reality Version) - 3:07; 2. "Hard of Hearing" (Alternate Reality Version) - 3:15; 3. "Personal Giants" (Alternate Reality Version) - 3:25; 4. "Guilt" (Alternate Reality Version) - 2:43; 5. "Better Days" (Alternate Reality Version) - 2:18; 6. "Dead Ends" (Alternate Reality Version) - 3:55
Reveries	2020	1. "Reveries" - 3:28
Hidden Hollow, Vol. One - Singles - EP	2021	1. "The Missing Road" - 4:08; 2. "Sunlight" - 3:52; 3. "More Clay Than Stone (Still on Our Way)" - 3:28; 4. "Downstream" - 0:29; 5. "The River with No Name" - 3:08; 6. "Under the Same Sun" - 3:20
Dreamless Sleep	2021	1. "Dreamless Sleep" - 3:19
One Last Dream	2021	1. "One Last Dream" - 4:52
A Light In The Woods - Book One: Hidden Hollow	2023	1. "Message From The Other Side" - 5:38; 2. "Over The Garden Wall" - 3:52; 3. "Enter The Woods" - 8:32
The Murmuration	2026	1. "The Murmuration" - 5:02

=== Singles ===
Year	Title	Chart			Certification	Album
Year	Title	FR	NED	SWI	Certification	Album
2007	"Welcome Home"	83	18	38		Ghost

=== Music videos ===
Year	Song	Album
2007	"Welcome Home"	Ghost
2010	"Doorways"	Touch The Sky EP
2012	"We're On Our Way"	The Bastards: Volume One
2012	"A Pound of Flesh"	The Family Tree: The Roots
2012	"Always Gold"	The Family Tree: The Roots
2013	"Holy Branches"	The Family Tree: The Branches
2014	"The Mute"	The Family Tree: The Branches
2016	"Secrets (Cellar Door)"	The Family Tree: The Leaves
2016	"The Road To Nowhere"	The Family Tree: The Leaves
2016	"Everything Costs"	The Family Tree: The Leaves
2017	"Sunn" "Moonn" "Eclippse"	SunnMoonnEclippse
2019	"Doubt"	Therapy
2019	"Hard of Hearing"	Therapy
2024	"Latin For Joy"	Mixtape
