= Boy in Static =

American indie rock band

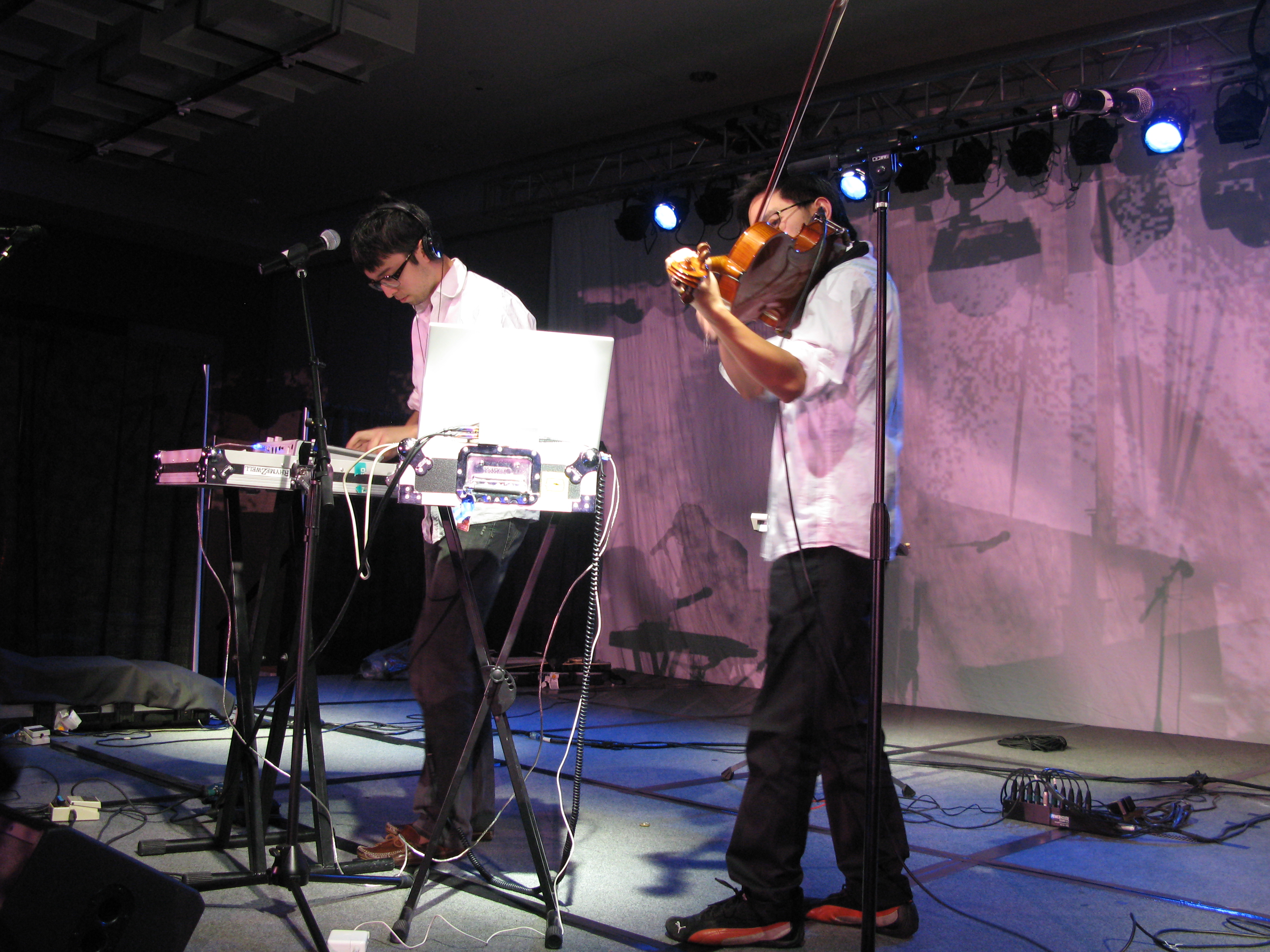
- Boy in Static performing live in 2008

Background information
- Genres: Indie rock, indietronica
- Years active: 2004–present
- Labels: Fake Four Inc; Circle Into Square; Mush Records; And Records; Alien Transistor
- Members: Alexander Chen; Kenji Ross
- Website: www.boyinstatic.com

Boy in Static is an indie rock band currently based in San Francisco, California, composed of Alexander Chen and Kenji Ross. The band has toured internationally with bands such as 13 & God, Freezepop, and Lymbyc Systym.

Allmusic lists some contemporary comparisons as The Postal Service and Mobius Band.

== History ==
Alexander Chen's recording career began when he sent a demo to Markus Acher of The Notwist, who had recently started his own record label Alien Transistor. A few months later, he received an email from Acher. They met at The Notwist show in Boston. They decided to release his debut album, Newborn. Chen mastered the album at Abbey Road Studios and it was released in 2004.

In 2005, Boy in Static supported 13 & God, an alternative hip hop group composed of Themselves and The Notwist, opening for their European and US tours. For their Irving Plaza show, Jon Pareles of The New York Times said, "amid the echoes of 1980's bands like New Order, Mr. Chen revealed a strong sense of melody and his own blend of diffidence, longing and tenacity."

Boy in Static's second album Violet was released on Mush Records in May 2007. It was described as "an impressive one-man symphony" by The Boston Globe and "a ballad of electronic snaps and true dream-pop vocals" by URB. Many magazines noted its influences by 1990s shoegaze bands such as Slowdive and My Bloody Valentine, with its "Loveless fascination" (Remix).

In 2007 and 2008, Boy in Static toured with the band Freezepop. Both Chen and Ross also performed as members of Freezepop on this tour.

Boy in Static released the third album, Candy Cigarette, on Fake Four Inc and Circle Into Square in 2009.

In 2010, Alexander Chen released an album under the name The Consulate General, which included guests such as Antoine Bédard of Montag and Simon Scott of Slowdive.

Alexander Chen has collaborated with Blue Sky Black Death. Their collaborative album, Third Party, was released on Fake Four Inc in 2010.

== Discography ==
=== Albums ===
- Newborn (2004)
- Violet (2007)
- Candy Cigarette (2009)

=== Singles ===
- "Lifetime Achievement Award" (2005)
- "Where It Ends" (2008)
- "Young San Francisco" (2009)
