= Ceschi =

American rapper (born 1981)

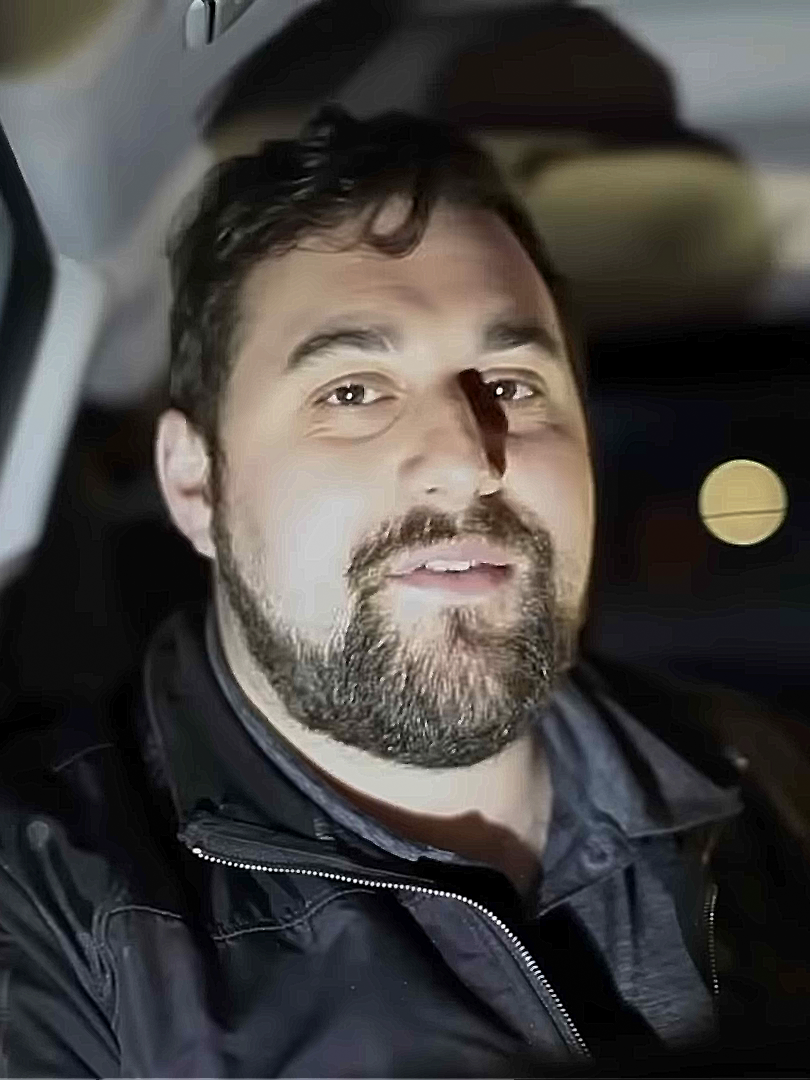
- Ceschi in 2015

Background information
- Also known as: Ceschi Ramos
- Born: Julio Francisco Ramos; July 24, 1981 (age 45)
- Origin: New Haven, Connecticut, US
- Genres: Hip-hop, folk punk
- Occupations: Rapper, singer-songwriter, multi-instrumentalist, record producer
- Years active: 2002–present
- Labels: Fake Four Inc., Beyond Space Entertainment
- Website: ceschi.bandcamp.com

Julio Francisco Ramos (born July 24, 1981), better known as Ceschi Ramos, or simply as Ceschi (/ˈtʃɛski/ CHESS-kee), is an American rapper from New Haven, Connecticut. He is a co-founder of Fake Four Inc. He won the Connecticut Music Awards for Best Hip Hop in 2014.

== Life and career ==
Ceschi released his first solo album, Fake Flowers, in 2004. They Hate Francisco False followed in 2006.

In 2008, Ceschi and his brother David Ramos founded the record label Fake Four Inc.

In 2010, Ceschi was arrested and pleaded guilty to a 100-pound marijuana shipment that he accepted at the home of his grandfather in New Haven.

Ceschi released The One Man Band Broke Up, a collaborative album with German producer DJ Scientist, in July 2010. It was described by Tiny Mix Tapes as "music for the saddest party in recorded human history."

In 2014, Ceschi won the Connecticut Music Awards for Best Hip Hop. He released Broken Bone Ballads, a collaborative album with Canadian producer Factor Chandelier, in April 2015. In 2019, Jahan Nostra and Ceschi won Best Music Video at the Hip Hop Film Festival for their video “El Chapo.”

=== Codefendants ===
Codefendants
- Genres: Punk rock; punk rap; New Wave; experimental music
- Years active: 2021-present
- Members: Ceschi; Sam King; Fat Mike

In 2021, Ramos formed his newest project Codefendants, alongside fellow punk rock musicians Fat Mike of NOFX and Sam King of Get Dead. The group seeks to break genre barriers and produces a mix of hip-hop, new wave, and punk rock, which they call "crime wave". The group has opened for NOFX on their farewell tour, and shared the stage with notable punk rock acts, including Lagwagon, Pennywise, and Circle Jerks. Codefendants released their debut album, This is Crime Wave on March 24, 2023.

== Discography ==
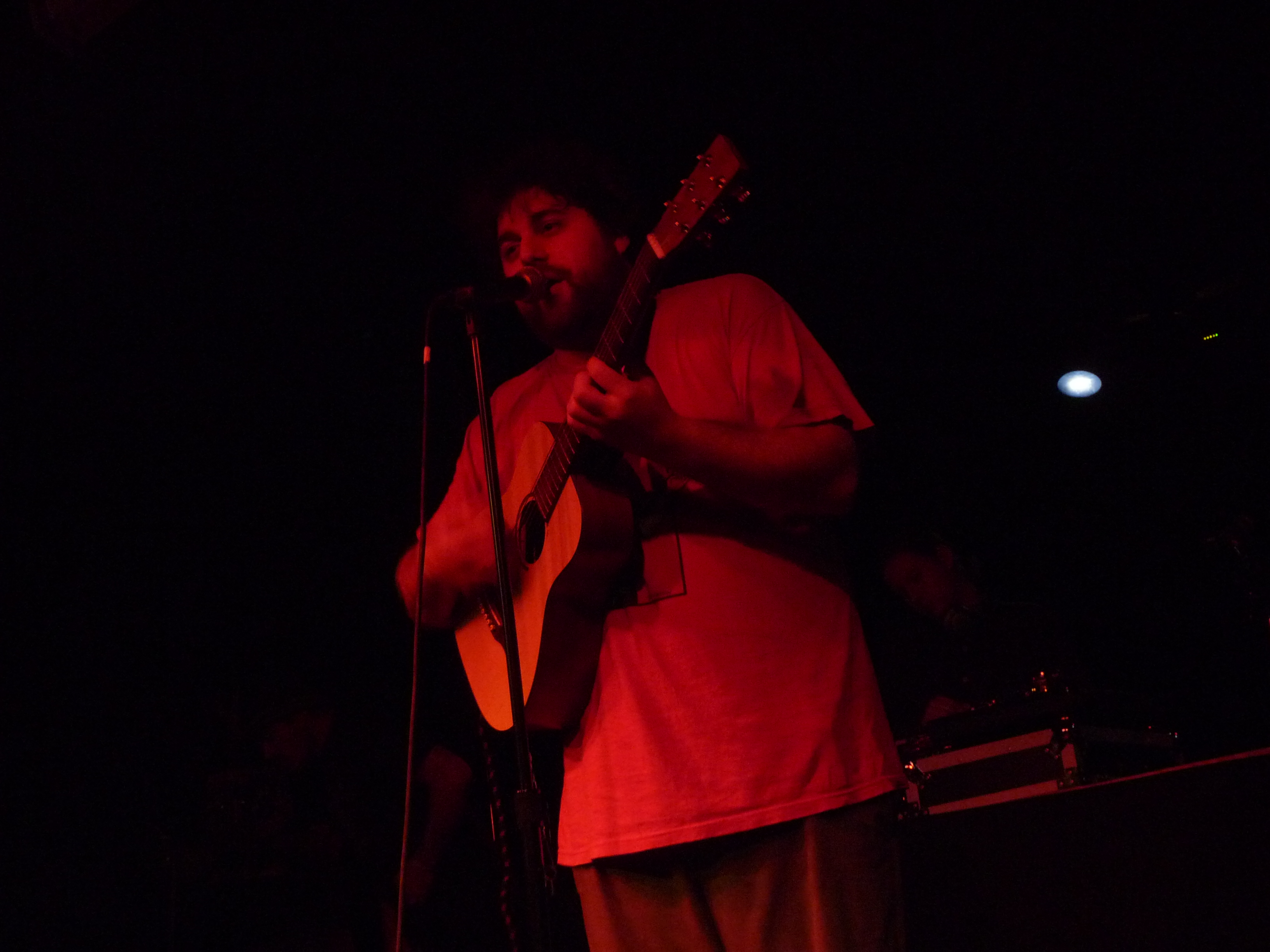
Ceschi performing in Portland, Oregon in 2009.

Solo studio albums

- Fake Flowers (Beyond Space, 2004)
- They Hate Francisco False (Net31, 2006)
- The One Man Band Broke Up (Fake Four Inc., 2010) (with DJ Scientist)
- Broken Bone Ballads (Fake Four Inc., 2015) (with Factor Chandelier)
- Sad, Fat Luck (Fake Four Inc., 2019) (with Factor Chandelier)
- Sans Soleil (Fake Four Inc., 2019)
- This Guitar Was Stolen Along with Years of Our Lives (Fake Four Inc., 2021)
- Bring Us the Head of Francisco False (Part 1) (Fake Four Inc., 2024)
- Bring Us the Head of Francisco False (Part 2) (Fake Four Inc., 2024)

B-side / demo albums

- Fake Flowers R.I.P. 1 (2005)
- Fake Flowers R.I.P. 2 (2005)
- Fake Flowers R.I.P. 3 (2005)
- Forgotten Forever (Cooler Than Cucumbers, 2014)
- Elm St. Sessions (Fake Four Inc., 2018)

Toca (Ceschi with Danny Levin, David Ramos, Max Heath, Tommy V & Xololanxinxo)

- Dancing with Skeletons (2003)
- Toca (Two Tone Elephants, 2007)

Dead by Wednesday (Ceschi with David Ramos, Opus, et al.)

- Democracy Is Dead (Stillborn, 2005)
- The Killing Project (Eclipse, 2008)
- The Last Parade (Eclipse, 2011)

Codefendants (Ceschi with Sam King and Fat Mike)

- This Is Crime Wave (Bottles to the Ground, 2023)
- Lifers (This Is Crime Wave/Regime, 2026)

Other collaborations

- Anonymous Inc. (Anonymous Inc., 2001) (with David Ramos, as Anonymous Inc.)
- A.O.K. (Anonymous Inc., 2003) (with David Ramos, Jay Scafariello & Robert Koizura, as The Most)
- Knuck Feast (Grimm Image, 2007) (with David Ramos, iCON the Mic King & Jay Scafariello, as Knuck Feast)
- Ceschi / Pat the Bunny (DIY Bandits, 2016) (with Pat the Bunny)

Singles

- "Count on It" b/w "Bad Jokes" (2008)
- "Same Old Love Song" (2009)
