= Fake Four Inc. =

American independent record label

Fake Four
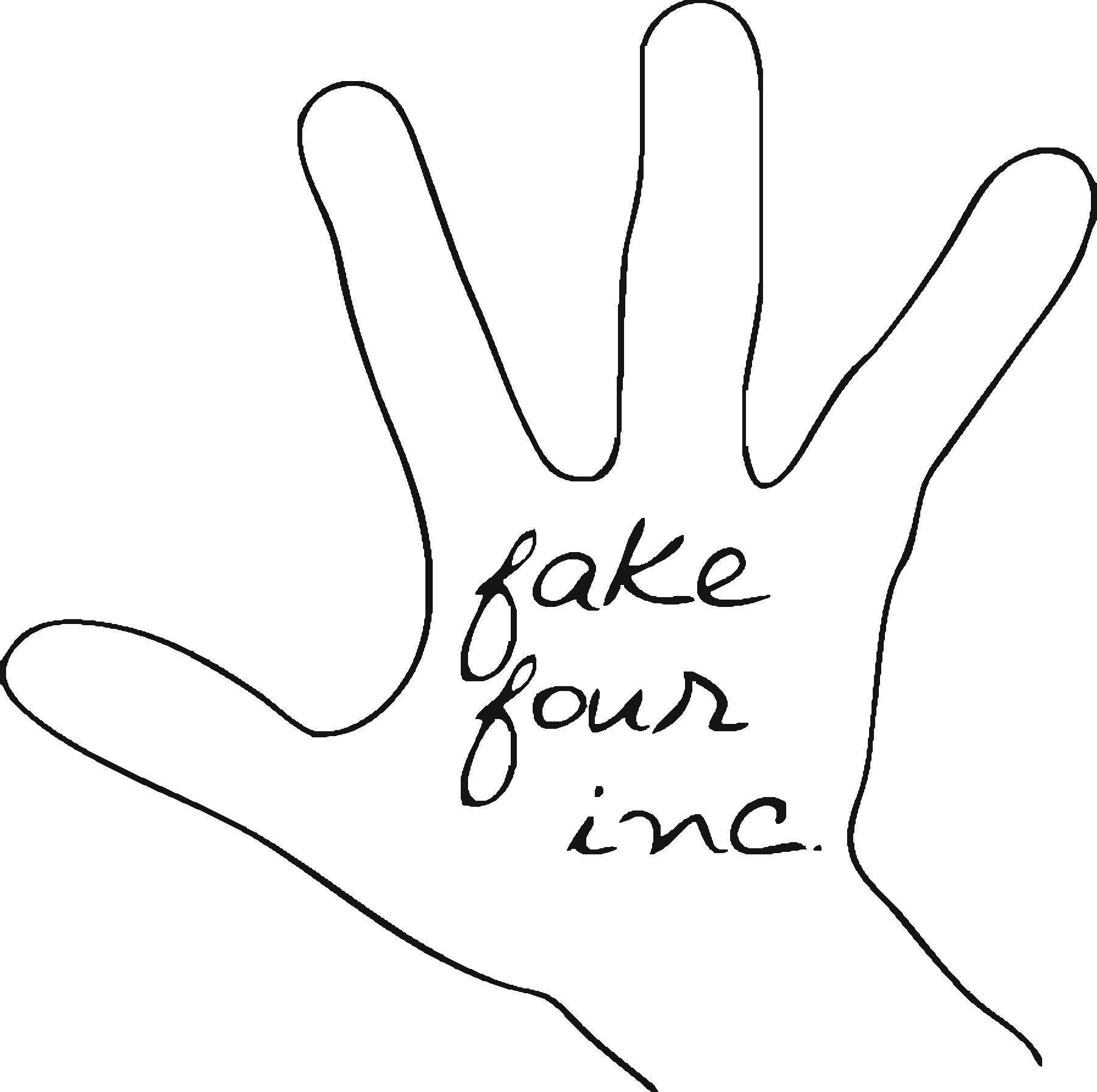
- Founded: 2008
- Founder: Ceschi, David Ramos
- Distributors: Sonic Unyon, Redeye Distribution
- Genre: Indie hip-hop, indie rock
- Country of origin: U.S.
- Location: New Haven, Connecticut
- Official website: www.fakefourinc.com

Fake Four is an independent record label based in New Haven, Connecticut. It was founded by brothers Ceschi and David Ramos in 2008.

According to an interview with Ceschi on Ugsmag.com, the Ramos brothers started Fake Four with help from Grimm Image Records in San Bernardino, California and Squids Eye Recording Collective in Dayton, Ohio as an outlet to release and distribute their personal music projects and those of their friends. Since the initial release This Up Here by David Ramos, Fake Four Inc. has been a self-sufficient label.

== Style ==
Fake Four Inc. does not adhere to genre specifications. Brett Uddenberg of URB praised the label for pushing the boundaries of indie rap. Chris Faraone of The Phoenix wrote: "you heard it here first: Fake Four is the most important label in progressive hip-hop right now."

== History ==
The first full-length release on Fake Four Inc. came with This Up Here by David Ramos on May 20, 2008. It is a self-published album by co-founder of the label and Modern Drummer magazine's Top 10 Progressive drummers. and XLR8R.

In 2010, Fake Four Inc. became official label partners with Circle Into Square in Portland, Oregon and took on production and distribution duties for the smaller like-minded label. Fake Four Inc. is exclusively distributed by Sonic Unyon in Canada and Redeye Distribution worldwide.

In 2013, an Indiegogo campaign for Fake Four Inc. raised over $52,000 to cover manufacturing costs and operating expenses.

Fake Four Inc. has released albums by Astronautalis, Blue Sky Black Death, Boy in Static, Busdriver, Electric President, K-the-I???, Myka 9, Noah23. Nearly all releases on the label have placed on CMJ charts, including Vessel by Dark Time Sunshine on #2 CMJ Hip Hop ranking and Lawson Graham by Factor Chandelier and Owl Hours by Awol One & Factor on #3 CMJ Hip Hop showings.

Fake Four Inc. has also been noted for their intra-label collaborations and artists signed to the label have self-booked tours through the United States, Canada and Europe.

== Artists ==
According to their site as of 2017, Fake Four Inc.'s current promoted artists include

- Andy the Doorbum & Justin Aswell
- Bleubird
- Ceschi
- Factor Chandelier
- Gregory Pepper & His Problems
- Onry Ozzborn
- Zavala

Artists still on the roster include

- Awol One
- Bike for Three!
- Blue Sky Black Death
- Boy in Static
- Busdriver
- Cars & Trains
- Child Actor
- Dark Time Sunshine
- David Ramos
- Grayskul
- Louis Logic
- Moodie Black
- Open Mike Eagle
- Paranoid Castle
- Sadistik
- Sister Crayon
- Tommy V

Artists now archived include

- Astronautalis
- Common Grackle
- Electric President
- greencarpetedstairs
- K-the-I???
- Kaigen
- Mad Gregs
- Mic King & Chum
- Myka 9
- Nathaniel Motte
- Noah23
- Sixo
- Sole
- Sole and the Skyrider Band

Artists with one time releases on the label include

- Delby L
- Hired Hand
- Lord Fowl
- Pretend You're Happy
- Ron Contour

== See also ==
- List of record labels
- Underground hip-hop
- Northwestern hip-hop
