= Modal Soul Classics II =

Compilation album by Various artists
- Released: November 11, 2010
- Recorded: N/A
- Genre: Hip hop Jazz
- Length: 52:01
- Label: Hydeout Productions
- Producer: N/A

Nujabes chronology
Modal Soul Classics (2008)	Modal Soul Classics II (2010)

Modal Soul Classics II is a tribute compilation album dedicated to the Japanese music producer Nujabes. It is produced by various artists including Uyama Hiroto, Five Deez, Pase Rock, Calm, Zack Austin, Specifics, and clammbon. It's the first album released by Hydeout Productions since Nujabes' death. It's a tribute album mainly from artists who worked with Nujabes on the previous albums. The album contains for the most part cover versions and remixes of Nujabes songs. The photograph on the cover is from Japanese photographer Ota Yoshiharu.

== Track listing ==
1. "Kamakura (Conversations with Jun)" (Pase Rock) 4:54
2. "Music is Ours (Saxmental Version)" (Calm) 6:35
3. "No One Like You" (Zack Austin) 4:22
4. "Beach Of Life" (Specifics) 4:24
5. "Another Reflection (Seaside Dusk in Kamakura Rework)" (FK) 3:47
6. "Modal Soul (Kenmochi Hidefumi Remix)" (Kenmochi Hidefumi) 5:11
7. "Latitude Tribute Mix" (Five Deez) 3:56
8. "A Day by Atmosphere Eternal" (Emancipator) 3:48
9. "Faure" (Haruka Nakamura feat. Uyama Hiroto) 4:49
10. "Reflection Eternal" (Clammbon With Yamazaki, Mino, and Yamane from toe) 4:16
11. "Homeward Journey" (Uyama Hiroto) 5:24

== Pointers to Nujabes ==
- "Kamakura (Conversations with Jun)" contains parts of a talk between Nujabes and the author ('Jun' is Nujabes' first name).
- "Music is Ours" is a reference to Nujabes' song "Music is Mine" from the album Modal Soul.
- "Beach Of Life" uses a pun in its refrain with two of Nujabes' co-production album titles: "Check me out on the beach of life. Mellow Beats, Friends and Lovers and many others, so many others. Try to exist in the beautiful. It's false, it's just Bullshit as Usual."
- "Another Reflection" is a cover version of Nujabes' same-titled song released on Hydeout Productions 2nd Collection.
- "Modal Soul" is a remix of Nujabes' song "Modal Soul" released on the same-titled album Modal Soul.
- "Latitude Tribute Mix" uses music which is equal to its original version "Latitude" from the album Metaphorical Music, but the lyrics describe the author's memories about Nujabes (e.g. "I made a whole record one floor down from your home"). He often redirects to the original lyrics with a slightly different meaning ("You can call me on your mobile phone" in the original version and "I used to call you on your mobile phone" in the tribute mix).
- "A Day by Atmosphere Eternal" is a cover of the similarly-titled song off the album Metaphorical Music.
- "Reflection Eternal" is a cover of the same-titled song off the album Modal Soul.
