= Luv(Sic) Hexalogy =

Luv(sic) Hexalogy

Compilation album by Nujabes & Shing02
- Released: December 9, 2015
- Genres: Hip hop, jazz rap, electronica
- Length: 31:48 (first 6 tracks); 1:06:17 (first disc); 2:12:41 (both discs)
- Label: Hydeout Productions
- Producer: Nujabes

Nujabes & Shing02 chronology
Spiritual State (2011)	Luv(sic) Hexalogy (2015)

Luv(sic) Hexalogy is a collaborative album by the Japanese producer Nujabes and Japanese hip hop artist Shing02, posthumously released five years after the death of Nujabes in 2010. It is a jazz hip hop album that incorporates Latin jazz, drum beats, and soul samples to create the instrumentals. Various DJs performed the scratching, and Shing02 created the vocals and lyrics.

== Background ==
Luv(sic)'s title plays off the Latin sic, which is typically used to refer to a typo in quoted text. A journal entry by Shing02, from the notebook accompanying the Luv(sic) Hexalogy release:

I first dedicated "Luv(sic)" to the goddess of music in the end of 2000, and fifteen years later, we have a six-part series (Hexalogy). There is a certain voice that unites the chapters, a character if you will. The way Luv(sic) is spelled (as in the Latin sic, for a misspelled quote) symbolizes how it wasn't a straightforward love song, there's a layer of obscured honesty. Obviously, there's many classic hip-hop songs in the form of love letters, such as LL Cool J's "I Need Love", or Common's "I Used to Love H.E.R", but to me it was important to write something personal, a song that spoke about my own vulnerability about wanting to have a lasting relationship with music.

— Shing02, Luv(sic) Hexalogy Notebook (December 9, 2015)

From 2001 and until the death of Nujabes in 2010, parts 1 to 3 had already been released in his other studio albums, but after Seba died unexpectedly, there was public uncertainty around whether the series could be finalized. The instrumentals of Parts 4 and 5 had already been completed before his death, and were released shortly after the news was released of his passing. Part 6 was released on February 26, 2013, on the third anniversary of Seba's death. According to Shing02's official statement on Facebook, the instrumental track for what would become Part 6 was found on Nujabes' phone a few weeks after his death.

There are six individual vinyl pressings of each Luv(sic) part/song; on December 9, 2015, the official CD was released by Nujabes’ record label Hydeout Productions which combines the original six Luv(sic) songs as well as the instrumentals of the songs and remixes made by other artists such as the Australian producer Ta-ku (Regan Mathews), LASTorder, Jumpster, and Uyama Hiroto.

== Creation of Luv(sic) ==
=== Part 1 (2001) ===
I remember recording the vocals to Luv(sic) on a Roland VS-1640 and an Octava mic (which I still use) at my home studio in El Cerrito. As noted, the song is a simple letter from a 25-year old rapper. It was a departure from my usual style, but a return to poetry I had written back in high school. In essence, rap is a form of creative writing and storytelling at its best. I was building a character that spoke in idioms and riddles, but also a narrative you can relate to by reading "between the rhymes." After listening back to the song, I wasn't sure about my delivery, but it didn't really matter, either. I was living the moment.

— Shing02

Nujabes incorporates a sample from Aki Takase's "Minerva's Owl" that he used alongside drum breaks and basslines to create the instrumental. The intro is a vocal sample of Bill Cosby from Buck, Buck – "I told you that story to tell you this one". There are three verses in this song, and between each verse is a hook of Shing02 alongside a vocal sample of Richard Pryor scratched in. The vinyl pressing of part 1 was originally released in Japan in 2001 with the cover being a photograph by Emuse of Shing02 with a dog in Yakushima. Shing02's lyrics were inspired by Common's song "I Used to Love H.E.R.", which he felt had similar production.

=== Part 2 (2002) ===
Shing02 opted to title Luv(sic) Part 2 as a sequel, as if it were a letter to someone that "he had lost touch with". Luv(sic) Part 2 was released after the events of 9/11. As Shing02 was set to fly back to California, the terrorist attack occurred and postponed his flight.

Nujabes emailed me another track. It was a nice release from the task at hand and the vibe inspired me to write what I was feeling towards the world. the first line came naturally, "once again now..."

— Shing02

The vinyl pressing of Part 2 was originally released in Japan in 2002 with the cover being an artwork created by graffiti artist Syu. Nujabes used the jazz sample from the song "Qualquer Dia", pitching it down and increasing the BPM. Alongside drum beats and scratching done by DJ Dai-Nasty in M2R Studio.

=== Part 3 (2005) ===
As Luv(sic) Part 2 was completed, Nujabes would message Shing02 for the next installment. Shing02 said the message behind Part 3 would be about the power of music and the need to return to our music roots as individuals to discover this "power". Part 3 has also been characterized as "a protest against hip-hop's increasing commercialization".

[...] I would convince him that there were many fans worldwide who are fully behind the series concept, and that we shouldn't deprive them from content. In the end he folded, and that was an example of us working out our differences.

— Shing02

Luv(sic) Part 3 was originally released as the fourth track of Nujabes' album Modal Soul. An extended version leaked on the internet featured a third verse, as well as a spoken word intro and outro sampled from Rod McKuen's spoken word album In Search of Eros. A snippet of the latter mix was released in Shing02's collaboration with DJ Icewater, For the Tyme Being, as a medley with a duet rendition of Part 1 featuring Emi Meyer. On March 1, 2010, a new rendition was released on Shing02's YouTube channel as a tribute to Jeff Resurreccion, a beatboxer and fan of Shing02 who died of cancer in January of that year. As part of the Hexalogy compilation, a remastered version with a new vocal take was released in Japan in March 2015 10 years later than the digital release and 1 month after the CD release. This mix features a third verse but lacks the Rod McKuen samples or the break without drums heard in the original and leaked versions. A remix by Ta-ku is also featured in the single release. The vinyl cover was also created by Syu who did the cover for part 2. The song is the second in the series to sample the work of Brazilian singer Ivan Lins - the song features a loop from a cover of Tens (Calmaria) by Nana Caymmi, with Ivan Lins (the original singer) on the piano. The DJ scratching was performed by Spin Master A-1 at Shing02's studio.

=== Part 4 (2011) ===
Shing02 had asked Nujabes in 2008 that the Luv(sic) series was complete, but under the condition that if he gave him three more instrumental tracks to work with then he could continue the series further. With help from other Japanese musicians such as Uyama Hiroto - after a few years, two of those requested instrumentals would later be Part 4 and 5. The vinyl pressing of Part 4 was originally released on July 7. The artwork was completed by artist FJD.

=== Part 5 (2012) ===
Nujabes originally felt that the Part 5 instrumental was too dark to be used, but Shing02 wanted a sound that would depart from the harmonic and peaceful sounds of the previous installments. The lyrics of Part 5 were written after Nujabes's death, and feature Shing02 eulogizing both Nujabes and deceased beatboxer Jeff Resurreccion.

When the pieces fit perfectly, there's always a strange sense of serendipity. I'm sure all artists can attest to that, those are moments that remind us why we fell in love with creating.

— Shing02

The vinyl pressing was released on December 26 in Japan, with artwork created by FJD.

=== Grand Finale (2013) ===
As Shing02 was visiting the store Tribe Records, the owner of the store said to Shing02 that an instrumental track called "Luv(sic) Grand Finale" had been discovered on Nujabes' phone after his death.

[...] I was quite shocked and he played me the loop inside the store. It was a simple loop, but I instantly knew that we had to finish it.

— Shing02

The vinyl pressing was released on February 26 and the artwork was created by FJD. The instrumental was a sample loop of "Choro das Águas" by Ivan Lins, with the DJ scratching being completed by DJ Kou.

== Release and reception ==
Luv(sic) has been widely regarded with over 80 million views on streaming platforms. The widespread critical acclaim has allowed there to be an annual tribute concert held on Nujabes' passing where Nujabes' collaborative artists play live and Shing02 plays Luv(sic) in its entirety. On March 25, 2018, the Luv(sic) album was released on Spotify alongside all of the remixes and instrumentals found on the CD.

== Track listing ==
No.	Title	Writer(s)	Producer	Length
1.	"Luv(sic) Part 1"	Shing02	Nujabes	4:46
2.	"Luv(sic) Part 2"	Shing02	Nujabes	4:33
3.	"Luv(sic) Part 3"	Shing02	Nujabes	6:14
4.	"Luv(sic) Part 4"	Shing02	Nujabes	5:10
5.	"Luv(sic) Part 5"	Shing02	Nujabes & Uyama Hiroto	5:49
6.	"Luv(sic) Grand Finale"	Shing02	Nujabes & Uyama Hiroto	5:16
7.	"Luv(sic) (12" Remix)"	Shing02	Nujabes	4:57
8.	"Luv(sic) Part 2 (Acoustica)"	Shing02	Nujabes	6:33
9.	"Luv(sic) Part 3 (Ta-ku Remix)"	Shing02	Nujabes & Taku	4:56
10.	"Luv(sic) Part 4 (LASTorder Remix)"	Shing02	Nujabes & LASTorder	4:38
11.	"Luv(sic) Part 5 (Jumpster Remix)"	Shing02	Nujabes & Jumpster	4:38
12.	"Luv(sic) Part 6 (Uyama Hiroto Remix)"	Shing02	Nujabes & Uyama Hiroto	4:38
13.	"Perfect Circle"	Shing02	Nujabes	4:00
