= Hydeout Productions 1st Collection =

Compilation album by Nujabes
- Released: April 23, 2003
- Genre: Instrumental hip-hop; hip-hop; jazz
- Length: 56:00
- Label: Hydeout Productions
- Producer: Nujabes

Nujabes chronology
Hydeout Productions 1st Collection (2003)	Metaphorical Music (2003)

Professional ratings
Review scores
Source	Rating
Chillhop	(favorable)

Hydeout Productions 1st Collection is a compilation album, the first of two released by Nujabes' Hydeout Productions label. It showcases Nujabes' style of combining the music genres of hip-hop and jazz, and features artists Funky DL, Apani B, Substantial, Shing02, L-Universe, Pase Rock, Five Deez, and Cise Starr.

== Track listing ==
No.	Title	Producer	Length
1.	"Moon Strut (Intro)"	Nujabes	1:55
2.	"Don't Even Try It" (featuring Funky DL)	Nujabes	4:52
3.	"Strive" (featuring Apani B)	Nujabes	4:22
4.	"Home Sweet Home" (featuring Substantial)	Monorisick/DJ Deckstream	3:43
5.	"Still Talking To You"	Nujabes	3:25
6.	"Luv (Sic)" (featuring Shing02)	Nujabes	4:48
7.	"Steadfast"	Nujabes	4:12
8.	"Lyrical Terrorists" (featuring Substantial & L-Universe)	Nujabes	3:50
9.	"Lose My Religion (Remix)" (featuring L-Universe)	Monorisick/DJ Deckstream	4:08
10.	"It's About Time (Fat Jon Remix)" (featuring Pase Rock)	Fat Jon	4:44
11.	"Plazma Avenue (Remix)" (featuring Five Deez)	Nujabes	4:10
12.	"D.T.F.N." (featuring Cise Starr)	Nujabes	3:55
13.	"Peoples Don't Stray" (featuring Funky DL)	Nujabes	4:02
14.	"Luv (Sic) Part 2" (featuring Shing02)	Nujabes	4:34
Total length:			56:00
