= Cyne =

American hip-hop group

CYNE
- Origin: Gainesville, Florida, United States
- Genres: Alternative hip-hop, experimental
- Years active: 2001-present
- Labels: Botanica Del Jibaro, Hometapes, City Centre Offices, Project Mooncircle
- Members: Clyde "Cise Starr" Graham; David "Enoch" Newell; Michael "Speck" Gersten
- Past members: Akin Yai
- Website: projectmooncircle.com/artist/cyne/

Cyne, often stylized as CYNE ("Cultivating Your New Experience"; pronounced "sign"), is an American alternative hip-hop group originating from Gainesville, Florida. The group consisted of MCs Akin Yai and Clyde "Cise Starr" Graham, and producers David "Enoch" Newell and Michael "Speck" Gersten, and are currently signed to Hometapes.

== History ==
Cyne formed in the summer of 2001. Their tracks are politically charged, with culturally introspective, motivational lyrical content influenced by Public Enemy, Paris, Lakim Shabazz, C.L. Smooth and the early work of Common. The production backing the vocals of Akin and Cise Starr is warm, soulful and organic, influenced by producers such as No I.D., Pete Rock and J Dilla. The group’s first release was the 12” ‘African Elephants’ on the Beta Bodega label Rice and Beans in 2001. Since this initial release the group have released several Eps and 12”s, have collaborated with artists such as Daedelus, Four Tet and Machinedrum and have performed with EL-P, KRS-One, Talib Kweli, Dälek, Atmosphere, The Beatnuts, The Roots, Sage Francis, Against Me!, Holopaw, Big Jus, Mr. Lif, ISIS, Push Button Objects and many more. They have previously released albums on Botanica Del Jibaro, P-Vine, Project: Mooncircle, Home Tapes and City Centre Offices.

CYNE's 2005 release Evolution Fight was named Album of the Week at Stylus Magazine for the week of August 29 – September 3, 2005. In 2007, CYNE released the Grey Matter EP on their website to be downloaded, free of charge. In 2014, the group released a studio album, All My Angles Are Right, on Hometapes.

== Style and influences ==
Their often socio-politically charged, culturally introspective, and motivational lyrics find influence rooted in blues, jazz, highlife, activism, humanities and philosophy.

== Discography ==
=== Studio albums ===
- Time Being (2003)
- Evolution Fight (2005)
- Tour CD 2005 (2005)
- Starship Utopia (2008)
- Pretty Dark Things (2008)
- Water for Mars (2009)
- All My Angles Are Right (2014)

=== Compilation albums ===
- Cyne (Collection 1999-2003) (2003)
- Wasteland Vol. 1: Killmore (2011)
- Wasteland Vol. 2 (2017)

=== EPs ===
- Movements (2002)
- Growing (2004)
- Running Water (2005)
- Grey Matter (2007)

=== Singles ===
- "African Elephants" (2001)
- "Midas" (2002)
- "Out of Time" (2003)
- "Due Progress" (2003)
- "Robert Grey" (2014)
- "Reset Sunset" (2021)
- "Falling Watchers" (2025)
- "fuller." (2025)
- "Boxing Day" (2025)
- "WhoDue." (2026)

=== Guest appearances ===
- Supersoul - "Sattva Guna (Make It Happen!)" from 40 Acres and a Moog (2002), "Satellites" from Plastic Rap (2007)
- Nujabes - "Lady Brown" and "Highs 2 Lows" from Metaphorical Music (2003), "Feather" from Modal Soul (2005), "D.T.F.N" from Hydeout Productions 1st Collection (2003), "Sky is Tumbling" from Spiritual State (2011)
- Daedelus - "Drops" from Exquisite Corpse (2005)
- Depth Affect - "One Day or So" from Arche-Lymb (2006)
- Seven Star - "Speak the Truth" (2006)
- Deceptikon - "Montana" from Greater Cascadia (2007)
- Project Mooncircle - "Kill the Music" and "Find Away" from The Heart on the Right Spot (2007), "Jakob Ladder" from Project Mooncircle 10th Anniversary Compilation (2012), "On the Head of the Crimson King" from Project Mooncircle: 15th Anniversary (2016)
- Moloco - "Shine" from Bonbonera (2008)
- Debilorithmicos - "I'm Out" from Dimarts i dijous (2008)
- Ernest Gonzales - "Upon The 49th Day - Cyne Cover" from Self Awakening - EP (2009)
- re:plus - "Sol" from Everlasting Truth (2010)
- Bop Alloy, Substantial, and Marcus D - "Another Day in the Life" from Substantial & Marcus D Are Bop Alloy (2010), "Step Into The Cypher" from Another Day in the Life of... (2014)
- Shoda Ish - "Simple Man" from Double I.D. (2011), "Complacency" and "The Passing" from Fox P2 (2013)
- Marcus D - "Melancholy Hopeful" and "Night on the Town" from Melancholy Hopeful (2012), "Dionysus", "Soul a la Mode", and "Earth Angel" from The Lone Wolf LP (2015), "Blinding Light" (2020), "Greater Purpose" (2021)
- Mr. Bambu - "Most Delightful" from Complete Contemplation (2012)
- P.R. - "We Will Make It" from Moment in Time (Deluxe Edition) (2013)
- Haruka Nakamura - "The Sun" from Melodica (2013)
- Ficus - "Level Up" from Black Foliage (2013)
- Acro Jazz Laboratories - "Headline - acro jazz laboratories remix" from Colors of Life by acro jazz laboratories (2014)
- Uyama Hiroto - "Soul of Freedom" from Freedom of the Son (2014)
- Cloud Ni9e - "Stages" from Alternative (2014)
- Akin Yai - "Escaping Dixie" from We Are Leaders Not Saints (2014)
- Kenichiro Nishihara - "believe" from Jazzy Folklore (2015)
- 14? - "Dreamland" (2015)
- Substantial - "No Better Time" from The Past Is Always Present in the Future (2017)
- Yusuke Hirado Prospect - "Monoliths" from Heritage (2017)
- Poldoore - "Blind Eyes" (2020)
- Korusai - "Ordinary Jazz" from snow luv (2023)
- Enoch - "Exact Change" from Waiting for Something to Happen (2024)
