= Metaphorical Music =

Studio album by Nujabes
- Released: August 21, 2003
- Genres: Jazz rap; instrumental hip hop
- Length: 62:30
- Label: Hydeout Productions
- Producers: Nujabes, Uyama Hiroto

Nujabes chronology
Hydeout Productions 1st Collection (2003)	Metaphorical Music (2003)	Modal Soul (2005)

Professional ratings
Review scores
Source	Rating
Sputnikmusic	4.5/5 stars

metaphorical music (stylised in lower case) is the debut studio album by Japanese musician Nujabes. Released in 2003, it offers a combination of hip hop and instrumental jazz, and features artists like Shing02, Substantial, Five Deez and Cise Starr (of CYNE). Despite the fact that the album has contributing vocals from several artists, it is roughly classified as an instrumental hip hop album.

Uyama Hiroto contributed to several notable tracks on the album, including "Letter from Yokosuka" and "Next View", and would appear on subsequent albums Modal Soul and Spiritual State.

== Track listing ==
No.	Title	Producer	Length
1.	"Blessing It (Remix)" (featuring Substantial & Pase Rock)	Nujabes	3:23
2.	"Horn in the Middle"	Nujabes	4:08
3.	"Lady Brown" (featuring Cise Starr)	Nujabes	3:18
4.	"Kumomi"	Nujabes	3:53
5.	"Highs 2 Lows" (featuring Cise Starr)	Nujabes	4:38
6.	"Beat Laments the World"	Nujabes	4:22
7.	"Letter from Yokosuka"	Uyama Hiroto	3:10
8.	"Think Different" (featuring Substantial)	Nujabes	3:17
9.	"A Day by Atmosphere Supreme"	Nujabes	3:59
10.	"Next View" (featuring Uyama Hiroto)	Nujabes	4:35
11.	"Latitude (Remix)" (featuring Five Deez)	Nujabes	3:56
12.	"F.I.L.O." (featuring Shing02)	Nujabes	3:31
13.	"Summer Gypsy"	Nujabes	4:19
14.	"The Final View"	Nujabes	3:35
15.	"Peaceland"	Nujabes	8:19
Total length:			62:30

Sample credits:

- "Blessing It (Remix)" contains a sample of "Save Our Children" from the album Save Our Children by Pharoah Sanders
- "Horn in the Middle" contains a sample of "Joshua" from the album Seven Steps to Heaven by Miles Davis
- "Lady Brown" contains a sample of "The Shade of the Mango Tree" by Luiz Bonfá
- "Beat Laments the World" contains a sample from Kip Hanrahan's "Make Love 2" and "Blessing It"
- "Think Different" contains a sample of "Live for Life (Vivre Pour Vivre)" from the soundtrack of Live for Life by Francis Lai
- "A Day by Atmosphere Supreme" contains a sample of "September Fifteenth (Dedicated to Bill Evans)" from the album As Falls Wichita, So Falls Wichita Falls by Pat Metheny and Lyle Mays
- "Latitude (Remix)" contains a sample of "Clouds" by Gigi Masin
- "F.I.L.O." contains a sample of "Deixa" by Baden Powell, played by Toquinho on "O Violão de Toquinho"
- "The Final View" contains a sample of "Love Theme From 'Spartacus'" from the album Eastern Sounds by Yusef Lateef

== Charts ==
Weekly chart performance for Metaphorical Music
Chart (2018)	Peak position
Japanese Hot Albums (Billboard Japan)	92
