= Hydeout Productions 2nd Collection =

Compilation album by Nujabes
- Released: November 11, 2007
- Genre: Hip-hop
- Length: 62:18
- Label: Hydeout Productions
- Producer: Nujabes

Nujabes chronology
Modal Soul (2005)	Hydeout Productions 2nd Collection (2007)	Spiritual State (2011)

Hydeout Productions 2nd Collection is a compilation album published by Japanese label Hydeout Productions in 2007. Mainly a Nujabes album, it features numerous other hip hop and downtempo artists including Pase Rock, Uyama Hiroto, and Shing02. It was Nujabes' last album before his death in 2010. The album cover image is a painting by Texas artist Cheryl D. McClure.

== Track listing ==
No.	Title	Producer(s)	Length
1.	"Voice of Autumn"	Nujabes	1:56
2.	"Sky Is Falling" (lyrics by and featuring C.L. Smooth)	Nujabes	4:41
3.	"Waltz for Life Will Born"	Uyama Hiroto	4:52
4.	"Imaginary Folklore" (written by Mito, featuring Clammbon)	Nujabes	5:18
5.	"Hikari" (featuring Substantial, lyrics by S. Robinson)	Nujabes	4:20
6.	"Counting Stars"	Nujabes	4:07
7.	"Another Reflection"	Nujabes	3:44
8.	"Fly by Night" (featuring Five Deez, lyrics by J. Marshall, K. David, P. Johnson)	Nujabes	3:57
9.	"Old Light (Voices from 93 Million Miles Away remix)" (lyrics by and featuring Pase Rock)	Nujabes	4:27
10.	"With Rainy Eyes" (edited by Nujabes)	Emancipator	4:59
11.	"Luv(sic) (Modal Soul remix)" (lyrics by and featuring Shing02, cuts by DJ Top Bill)	Nujabes	4:48
12.	"Windspeaks"	Uyama Hiroto	4:29
13.	"Winter Lane (Nujabes remix)" (written by Daisuke Kojima, originally by DSK(2))	Nujabes	5:11
14.	"After Hanabi (Listen to My Beats)"	Nujabes	5:23
