= Lady Brown (song) =

Single by Nujabes featuring Cise Starr
- Released: September 17, 2003
- Studio: Park Avenue Studios
- Genre: Hip hop Jazz rap Instrumental hip hop
- Length: 3:18
- Label: Hydeout Productions
- Songwriter: Jun Yamada
- Producer: Nujabes

"Lady Brown" is a song by Japanese hip-hop producer Nujabes. It was released as a single from Nujabes' debut solo album Metaphorical Music (2003). The single was released on 12" vinyl and sold in Nujabes' own 'Tribe' record stores located in Tokyo. The single featured rapper Cise Starr of American hip-hop group CYNE and Japanese DJ Nao Tokui.

The song is originally sampled from Luiz Bonfa's "The Shade of the Mango Tree" from Bonfa Burrows Brazil (1978). The record was recorded, mixed, and mastered at Park Avenue Studios.

== Track listing ==
1. A1 "Lady Brown (Street Version)" featuring Cise Starr
2. A2 "Lady Brown (Clean Version)" featuring Cise Starr
3. B1 "Lady Brown (Instrumental)"
4. B2 "Rotary Park" featuring Nao Tokui

=== "Rotary Park" ===
The B-side of the 12-inch single contains an instrumental track named "Rotary Park", credited to and produced by Urbanforest, an obscure experimental collaboration between Nujabes and Japanese electronic artist Nao Tokui, which was active from 2001 to 2004. "Rotary Park" is the only known finished track and official release by the group, and has been described as a "rare track" and "the most experimental sounding track in Nujabes’ discography" which "sounds nothing like any other Nujabes song in his entire discography". In an interview, Nao stated that the collaboration consisted of spending "one day a week [...] in [Nujabes'] studio", testing various ideas and techniques with various musical workstations, ideas such as "sampling, sequencing and complex sound effects using granular synthesis and such". The collaboration ended when Nao moved to Paris in the summer of 2004.
