= A Son of the Sun =

A Son of the Sun may refer to:

- A Son of the Sun (album), 2008, by Uyama Hiroto
- A Son of the Sun (novel), 1912, by Jack London
- Son of the Sun, a 2008 Turkish film
- "The Son of the Sun", a 1987 Scrooge McDuck comics story by Don Rosa
- The Son of the Sun (novel), 1986, by Moyra Caldecott, later titled Akhenaten: Son of the Sun
- "Son of the Sun", a 2018 song by Dierks Bentley from The Mountain (Dierks Bentley album)
