= Waikyoku =

Studio album by Shing02
- Released: June 18, 2008
- Studio: Annen Annex, Oakland, California
- Genre: Hip hop
- Length: 79:38
- Label: Mary Joy Recordings
- Producer: Vector Omega

Shing02 chronology
400 (2002)	Waikyoku (2008)	ASDR (with Chimp Beams) (2012)

Singles from Waikyoku
- 1. "Wankyoku / Katsubou" Released: 2008

Waikyoku (歪曲, Waikyoku) is a studio album by Japanese American hip hop artist Shing02. It was released on Mary Joy Recordings on June 18, 2008. It peaked at number 42 on the Oricon Albums Chart.

== Track listing ==
No.	Title	Japanese title	Length
1.	"Jo"	序	2:27
2.	"Jukou"	銃口	3:32
3.	"Katsubou"	渇望	3:09
4.	"Saikou"	再興	3:03
5.	"Shingane"	芯鉄	2:46
6.	"Shousou"	焦燥	4:38
7.	"Bijou, Part1"	美獣 上	8:53
8.	"Chotsugai"	蝶番	6:07
9.	"Bijou, Part2"	美獣 下	12:42
10.	"Sekkin"	接近	4:55
11.	"Kushi to Kanzashi"	櫛ト簪	4:06
12.	"Wankyoku"	湾曲	3:59
13.	"Houyou"	抱擁	5:06
14.	"Nagusame"	殴雨	4:34
15.	"Shakunetsu"	灼熱	5:17
16.	"Tamayura"	玉響	4:16

== Personnel ==
Primary artist

- Shing02 – vocals, drums (track 1), chimes (track 1), guitar (tracks 1, 3–6, 9, 10, 12), triangle (track 1), Fender Rhodes (track 2), piano (tracks 2, 13), synth (tracks 3–5, 7, 9, 11, 13, 14), Farfisa (track 3), vibraslap (track 3), bass (tracks 4, 10), organ (tracks 4, 6, 8), keyboards (tracks 5, 10), timpani (track 7), xylophone (tracks 9, 10), vibraphone (tracks 12, 14), Magnus (track 16), written by, orchestrated by

Musicians

- Fukashi Adachi – acoustic guitar (track 13), electric guitar (track 13)
- David Boyce – saxophone (tracks 3, 4, 6–10)
- Caveman – trumpet (tracks 4, 5), Fender Rhodes (track 12), bass (track 12)
- Dawgisht – synth (track 15), piano (track 15), vibraphone (track 15)
- Doc Max – Fender Rhodes (tracks 2, 3, 6, 7, 9), guitar (tracks 7, 9), synth (tracks 14, 16), bass (track 16)
- David Ewell – upright bass (tracks 9, 11, 15)
- Philip Gelb – shakuhachi (tracks 3, 7, 8)
- Goro – didgeridoo (track 5)
- Junzo – electric guitar (tracks 3, 9, 12), acoustic guitar (track 9), claves (track 12)
- Eiji Kachi – khoomii (track 1)
- KND – steel pan (track 9), Koto (track 11)
- Mr. Buckner – bass (tracks 7, 9)
- Myokei – bells (tracks 1, 4), cymbal (track 1)
- Kakushin Nishihara – biwa (tracks 7, 9, 16)
- Tetsu Nishiuchi – saxophone (tracks 4, 8)
- Yoshihiro Sako – bass (track 5)
- Tetsufumi Saito – trombone (tracks 4, 7, 8, 9)
- Ras Takashi – melodica (track 12)
- Ayumi Takeshima – violin (tracks 1, 2, 9, 14, 16), violin sample (track 10)
- Wesley Ueunten – sanshin (track 11)
- Motoki Yamaguchi – drum fills (tracks 1, 14, 16), drums (tracks 2–11, 13, 15), triangle (track 3), Korg Synth (track 4), sabar (track 4), metronome (track 6), cymbal (track 7), piano (track 10), bird call (track 11), tambourine (track 14)

Vocalists

- Ajo – vocals (track 3)
- Tadanobu Asano – vocals (track 5)
- Bobimon – additional vocals (track 12)
- Chiyori – vocals (tracks 7, 9, 16)
- Fuyu – vocals (tracks 9, 15)
- Junzo – vocals (track 3)
- Emi Meyer – vocals (tracks 8, 12)
- Myokei – vocals (track 1)
- Kakushin Nishihara – vocals (tracks 7, 9)
- Tamurapan – vocals (track 10)
- Wesley Ueunten – vocals (track 11)

Technical personnel

- Chiyori – effects (track 11)
- Dawgisht – drum programming (track 15)
- Doc Max – drum programming (tracks 14, 16)
- Ryota Hayashida – mixed by, mastered by
- Kentaro Munechika – sound effects (tracks 5, 11)
- Shing02 – recorded by, produced by, mixed by, edited by (tracks 4–6), faderboard (tracks 7, 9, 16), effects (track 7)
- Shuichi Sugimoto – edited by (tracks 2, 14), drum programming (track 5)

Design personnel

- Junko Gosho – liner notes
- Hiraku Suzuki – design
- Ayako Yamamoto – photography by

== Charts ==
Chart	Peak position
Japanese Albums (Oricon)	42
