= Funky DL =

American rapper

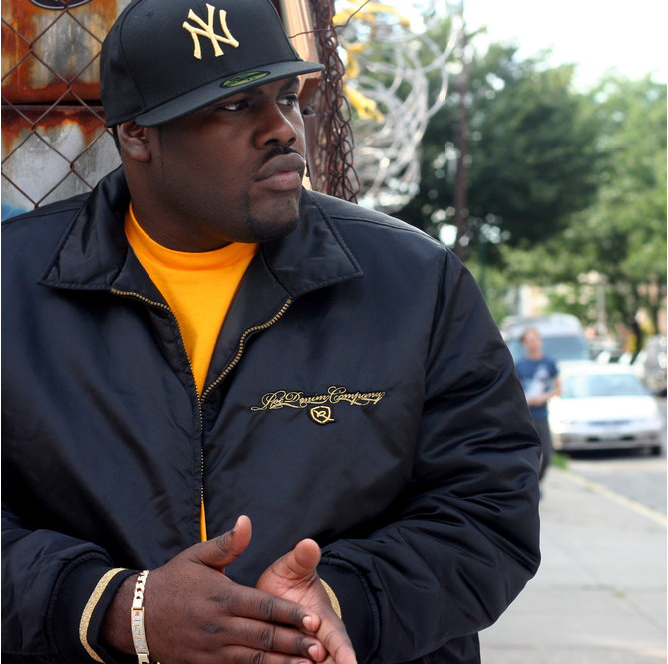

Background information
- Born: Naphta Newman; November 21, 1977 (age 49)
- Origin: Hackney, London
- Genres: Hip-hop; instrumental hip-hop
- Occupations: Rapper; songwriter; record producer
- Years active: 1995–present
- Labels: Utmost Records; Bad News Records; Washington Classics
- Formerly of: Thursdays Love

Naphta Newman (born November 21, 1977), better known by his stage name Funky DL, is an English rapper and record producer from Hackney, London.

== Career ==
His debut album Classic Was The Day won the 1997 MOBO Award for Best Hip Hop. He was also nominated in 1998 and 1999. Following the release of his second album Heartfelt Integrity his music has been released through his own label Washington Classics. In the early 2000’s he made multiple songs with Japanese record producer Nujabes. After his passing, Funky DL released a tribute song "Ode to Nujabes" in 2011. He authored a book titled The Blueprint for Independent Artists: Pursuing a Successful Career In the Music Business in 2024.

== Discography ==
=== Studio albums ===
Album also released as instrumental version*

- Classic Was The Day (1997)*
- Heartfelt Integrity (1998)
- One Another (1999)
- When Love Is Breaking Down… (2000)
- Blackcurrent Jazz (2001)*
- The Classic Fantasy (2003)
- The Red Pill And The Blue Pill (2003)
- The Red Pill, The Blue Pill (Volume 2: The Reload) (2004)
- Since 77 (2005)
- Street Love (2005)
- Street Swagger (2006)
- The Latin Love Story (2006)
- Music From Naphta (2007)
- The 4th Quarter (2007)*
- The Jazz That Was Forgotten (2008)
- The Interview (2009)
- A Classic Example Of A… (2010)*
- Blackcurrent Jazz 2 (2011)*
- NANE (2012)*
- The Jazzphonic Groove 1 & 2 (2013)
- Le Emporium De Jazz (2015)*
- The Jazz Lounge (2016)
- Autonomy (The 4th Quarter 2) (2016)*
- Blackcurrent Jazz 3 (2018)*
- Dennison Point (2018)*
- Life After Dennison (2019)*
- DEF (2019)*
- Twenty (2020)*
- Beautiful Soul (2021)*
- The In And Out Of Love Tape (2022)*
- Still Classic (2022)*
- Blendisms (Vol.1) (2023)*
- I Am Reuben (2023)*
- NEON II (2024)*
- The Boom Bap Specialist (2025)*
- Blackcurrent Jazz Echoes: Collector’s Piece (2026)*

=== Thursdays Love (with Sienna) ===
- For The Love Of Jazz And Thursdays (2003)
- Thursdays Quest (2006)
- Thursdays Finest: The Very Best Of Thursdays Love (2007)

=== Instrumental albums ===
- Jazzmatic Jazzstrumentals (2001)
- Cool Classic Jazzstrumentals, Vol. 1-4 (2011)
- Nights In Nippon Jazzstrumentals (2012)
- The Lawshank Redemption (2012)
- Too Hard To Beat (2012)
- Straight From The MPC, Vol. 1 (2013)
- From Street To Sweet (2013)
- A Treat To Repeat (2014)
- Another Instrumental Moment (2014)
- February: A Rest In Beats Tribute To The Sounds Of J Dilla & Nujabes (2014)
- Jazzmatic Jazzstrumentals, Vol. 2 (2014)
- Forever Instrumental (2015)
- Blue Silk Instrumentals (2015)
- For The Love Of Jazz And Thursdays (2016)
- Marauding At Midnight: A Tribute To The Sounds Of A Tribe Called Quest (2017)
- Incognito In Soho (2017)
- Half Jazz Half Amazing (2019)
- O Espírito do Brasil (2019)
- Hip-Hop Jazz …With Voices (2020)
- Trapped In Jazz (2021)
- Jazz Dust (2021)
- Lo-Fi Blue Beats (2022)
- Neon: Deluxe (2022)
- Jazzmatic 3 Jazzstrumentals (2022)
- Crate Diggers: Funky DL Legato Lush (2023)
- Get It In: Summer Sunshine (2023)
- A Vintage Soulful Boom Bap Christmas (2023)
- February’s Seba Lounge (2024)
- February’s Dillounge (2024)
- A Vintage Soulful Chilled Out Christmas (2024)
- Magic In The Rain (2024)
- Keys and Company (2025)
- Camden to Covent Yard (2026)

=== EPs ===
- Classic Moves (1996) (with Guile)
- The Record Shop (1997) (with DJ Stixx)
- The Main Features (1998)
- The Jazzy Ways (2001)
- Cut From The Illest Cloth (2015)
- The Lilac Pack (2024) (with Vsteeze)
- The Honey Pack (2021) (with Vsteeze)
- We Met In Tokyo (2021) (with Substantial)
- Whole Lot (2024) (with Vsteeze)
- The Jade Pack (2024) (with Vsteeze)
- Enharmonia (2025)
- The Cooler Shade of Midnight (2026)

=== Singles ===
Digital single*

- "Soul Silhouette" / "It’s About Time (And That’s True)" (1996)
- "Circles (Going Round)" (1997)
- "Worldwide" (with Ty) (1997)
- "Billie Holliday" / "100%" (1998)
- "Peoples Don’t Stray" (with Nujabes) (1999)
- "Adidas" / "Thought I Could Trust U" (1999)
- "I’d Like To Know" (1999)
- "Triangular Rotations" / "Is It A Dream?" (1999)
- "Everybody Rock On" / "Green Lights" (1999)
- "Loud Noise Of Silence [Dimensional Ball Remix]" (with Nujabes) (1999)
- "Don’t Even Try It" (with Nujabes) (2000)
- "Unstoppable" / "Peoples Don’t Stray [Remix]" (with Nujabes) (2000)
- "Hit Me" (2000)
- "& Ask For DL" (2001)
- "Day By Day" (2001)
- "The Music" / "About The Things" (2001)
- "Prediction" (2001)
- "Slow Down" / "Not Yet Known" (with Nujabes and Lefty Three) (2002)
- "Because Of You" / "Wonderful" (2002)
- "Action Replay (239)" / "World Applause" (2003)
- "Training Day" (with Sadat X) / "Serious" (2003)
- "Yeah" / "Me & My Microphone Pt. 1" (2003)
- "Fantasy" / "Yo (My Rhymes)[Remix]" (2003)
- "Just One Of Those Nights" / "Tangible (Lucy)" (2003)
- "Little Mike" / "Disconnected" (2004)
- "Love Is The Only" / "Glistening" (2005)
- "What A Shame" / "Here To Stay" (2005)
- "Not The 1 4 Me [Shin-Ski Remix]" (2006)
- "Hit Me [Remix]" / "Queen Of Diamonds [Remix]" (2006)
- "Glistening" / "About The Things [Latin Remixes]" (2006)
- "Blending Buttermilk With Sex Appeal" / "Only The Initials CM" (2007)
- "Stoppin & Startin" (2009)
- "Ode To Nujabes" (2011)*
- "Don’t Hold Ya Breath" (with Marcus D) (2012)
- "Blinding Light" (with Marcus D, Substantial and Cise Star) (2012)
- "The Rhapsody" (2016)*
- "Trinity" (with Marcus D, Substantial, Cise Star and Lei Ann) (2018)*
- "We Met In Tokyo" (2021)*
- "Beautiful Is A Heart Full Of Love" (2021)*
- "Return To Sender" (2021)*
- "Shades Of Division" (2021)*
- "Say Less" (2021)*
- "Tropic Exotic" (2022)*
- "Night Lights" (2022)*
- "Ultraviolet Glass" (2023)*
- "Floating Beams" (2023)*
- "Guardian Angel" (2023)*
- "So…" (2023)*
- "Superpowers" (with Stee Moglie) (2023)*
- "Full Court" (with E1EVENSHAY) (2024)*
