= Modal Soul Classics =

Compilation album by Various artists
- Released: June 6, 2008
- Genre: Hip hop Jazz
- Length: 72:48
- Label: Hydeout Productions
- Producer: Various

Various artists chronology
Hydeout Productions 2nd Collection (2007)	Modal Soul Classics (2008)	Mellow Beats, Friends & Lovers (2009)

Modal Soul Classics is a compilation album from Japanese hip hop producer Nujabes. Though the music on this album is commonly attributed to Nujabes, none of it is composed by him; the songs on this album were only compiled and mastered by him. All of it is by other artists who have inspired Nujabes.

== Track listing ==
1. Scott Matelic - "To Impress the Empress" 4:21
2. Sleep Walker - "AI-NO-KAWA" 6:36
3. Goldlix - "Atoll Moao" 4:55
4. Specifics - "Under the Hood" 3:53
5. DSK - "Winter Lane" 4:27
6. Blue Asia - "Mourn, Sob & Cry" 4:56
7. Haki R. Madhubuti - "Children" 10:36
8. Unison - "Sound Network" 4:07
9. Takero Ogata - "Omnipresence" 4:31
10. Todd Rundgren - "A Dream Goes On Forever" 2:22
11. Heprcam - "Dionna" 2:53
12. Clammbon - "Folklore" 5:19
13. Lava - "Vem Para Ficar" (from Ristorante Mixtape) 6:40
14. Omar Sosa - "Iyawo" 6:22.
