= Safe In the Steep Cliffs =

Studio album by Emancipator
- Released: 19 January 2010
- Genre: Trip hop, downtempo, chill-out
- Length: 57:23
- Label: Loci Records

Emancipator chronology
Soon It Will Be Cold Enough (2006)	Safe In the Steep Cliffs (2010)	Dusk to Dawn (2013)

Safe In the Steep Cliffs is the second studio album by Emancipator, released 19 January 2010.

== Tracks ==
The album includes the following tracks.

No.	Title	Length
1.	"Greenland"	3:11
2.	"Black Lake"	3:38
3.	"Jetstream"	4:01
4.	"Kamakura"	4:21
5.	"All Through the Night"	4:33
6.	"Old Devil"	4:01
7.	"Nevergreen"	3:35
8.	"Ares"	4:28
9.	"Rattlesnakes"	4:10
10.	"Bury Them Bones"	4:37
11.	"Vines"	4:38
12.	"Hill Sighed"	3:36
13.	"Siren"	3:40
14.	"Safe In the Steep Cliffs"	4:48
