= Modal Soul =

Studio album by Nujabes
- Released: November 11, 2005
- Genres: Jazz rap, hip hop, trip hop
- Length: 63:25
- Label: Hydeout Productions
- Producer: Nujabes

Nujabes chronology
Metaphorical Music (2003)	Modal Soul (2005)	Hydeout Productions 2nd Collection (2007)

Modal Soul is the second studio album by Japanese producer Nujabes, released on November 11, 2005, by Nujabes' own record label, Hydeout Productions. It would be the final album released by Nujabes during his lifetime before his death in 2010.

Like its predecessor, Metaphorical Music, Modal Soul fuses jazzy, smooth rhythms and hip hop. The album contains 14 tracks and features artists Cise Starr and Akin (of CYNE), Terry Callier, Shing02, Substantial, Pase Rock, Apani B and Uyama Hiroto.

Initially only released on CD, the album was reissued on vinyl by Hydeout Productions in 2020 and 2024.

== Track listing ==
No.	Title	Length
1.	"Feather" (featuring Cise Starr & Akin)	2:55
2.	"Ordinary Joe" (featuring Terry Callier)	5:07
3.	"Reflection Eternal"	4:17
4.	"Luv (Sic.) Part 3" (featuring Shing02)	5:36
5.	"Music Is Mine"	4:20
6.	"Eclipse" (featuring Substantial)	3:34
7.	"The Sign" (featuring Pase Rock)	4:49
8.	"Thank You" (featuring Apani B)	4:09
9.	"World's End Rhapsody"	5:41
10.	"Modal Soul" (featuring Uyama Hiroto)	4:41
11.	"Flowers"	3:59
12.	"Sea of Cloud"	3:01
13.	"Light on the Land"	3:55
14.	"Horizon"	7:20
Total length:		63:25

== Charts ==
Weekly chart performance for Modal Soul
Chart (2020)	Peak position
Japanese Hot Albums (Billboard Japan)	43
