= Stars Align =

Japanese anime television series

- Promotional art for the anime

星合の空 (Hoshiai no Sora)
- Genre: Drama, sports
- Created by: Kazuki Akane
- Anime television series
- Directed by: Kazuki Akane
- Produced by: Tomomi Kyoutani (TBS); Shousei Itou (Flying Dog); Yoshinori Hasegawa (Movic); Tooru Awaji (Eight Bit); Motoki Mukaichi (Shochiku)
- Written by: Kazuki Akane
- Music by: Jizue
- Studio: Eight Bit
- Licensed by: Crunchyroll
- Original network: TBS, BS-TBS
- Original run: October 10, 2019 – December 26, 2019
- Episodes: 12

Stars Align (星合の空, Hoshiai no Sora; transl. "Star-Crossing Skies") is a Japanese original anime television series written and directed by Kazuki Akane and animated by Eight Bit. The series aired from October 10 to December 26, 2019.

On May 20, 2020, a Special Fan Movie was released, which takes place two years after the end of the series.

== Plot ==
Toma Shinjo, a middle school student, is determined to save his school's struggling boys tennis club from disbandment. Consistently outperformed by the girls team and lacking skilled players, the club will be disbanded unless it can improve and show results. Toma's hopes rest on Maki Katsuragi, a quiet transfer student whose exceptional reflexes catch his attention. Although Maki initially refuses to join any clubs, Toma persuades him to participate by offering payment. Once on the team, Maki's natural talent and rapid improvement immediately set him apart, creating tension among the members, while also pushing them to take the sport seriously for the first time.

== Characters ==
Maki Katsuragi (桂木 眞己, Katsuragi Maki)
Voiced by: Natsuki Hanae (Japanese); Justin Briner (English)
The main protagonist, a transfer student who becomes the best player in the soft tennis club despite being a beginner. He lives with his mother after his parents got divorced and spends his time doing household chores.
Toma Shinjo (新城 柊真, Shinjō Tōma)
Voiced by: Tasuku Hatanaka (Japanese); Jessie James Grelle (English)
The captain of the soft tennis club. He is the only player on the team who took the sport seriously prior to recruiting Maki.
Itsuki Ameno (雨野 樹, Ameno Itsuki)
Voiced by: Yoshitsugu Matsuoka (Japanese); Derick Snow (English)
A member of the soft tennis club partnered up with Rintaro. He has a burn scar on his back as a result of his mother pouring boiling water on him when he was an infant.
Rintaro Futsu (布津 凜太朗, Futsu Rintarō)
Voiced by: Gen Satō (Japanese); Garret Storms (English)
The vice president of the boys soft tennis club and Itsuki's partner. He is an illegitimate child that resulted from a teen pregnancy who was put up for adoption. While he is loved by his adopted parents, when he learns about the truth regarding his birth he began to doubt himself. His academic skills are the best among the boys in the club.
Tsubasa Soga (曽我 翅翼, Soga Tsubasa)
Voiced by: Toshiyuki Toyonaga (Japanese); Ricco Fajardo (English)
A member of the boys soft tennis club partnered up with Shingo. He is the youngest of three children in his family. He played soccer up until middle school when he quit the sport to take up tennis instead much to his father's disapproval.
Shingo Takenouchi (竹ノ内 晋吾, Takenouchi Shingo)
Voiced by: Keisuke Sato (Japanese); Adam Gibbs (English)
A member of the boys soft tennis club partnered up with Tsubasa.
Nao Tsukinose (月ノ瀬 直央, Tsukinose Nao)
Voiced by: Yūsuke Kobayashi (Japanese); Matt Shipman (English)
A member of the boys soft tennis club partnered up with Taiyo. He plays tennis much to the disapproval of his mother as she sees tennis as being a distraction that negatively impacts his academic performance.
Taiyo Ishigami (石上 太洋, Ishigami Taiyō)
Voiced by: Kōhei Amasaki (Japanese); Dallas Reid (English)
A member of the boys soft tennis club partnered up with Nao.
Yū Asuka (飛鳥 悠, Asuka Yū)
Voiced by: Yoshitaka Yamaya (Japanese); Brandon McInnis (English)
The manager of the soft tennis club. They question their gender identity and identify as neither a boy nor a girl, although they haven’t found a label that fits them yet. Their name is technically Yūta Asuka (飛鳥 悠汰), but they have said that they prefer Yū. They seem to have a crush on Toma.
Kanako Mitsue (御杖 夏南子, Mitsue Kanako)
Voiced by: Mayu Mineda (Japanese); Rachel Glass (English)
Maki's neighbor and a classmate. She is often seen watching the boys soft tennis club practice.
Kei Takada (高田 希唯, Takada Kei)
Voiced by: Satsumi Matsuda (Japanese); Madeleine Morris (English)
The captain of the girls soft tennis team, and ace of the team. She is sympathetic with boys team efforts, and sometimes playing with them.
Namie Ameno (雨野 奈美恵, Ameno Namie)
Voiced by: Shiina Natsukawa (Japanese); Kate Bristol (English)
Kinuyo Kasuga (春日 絹代, Kasuga Kinuyo)
Voiced by: Maaya Sakamoto (Japanese); Tia Ballard (English)
The student council president. She is strict and results-oriented. Her philosophy leads her to issuing an ultimatum to the boys soft tennis club to field a competitive team or be dissolved.
Takuto Murakami (村上 拓人, Murakami Takuto)
Voiced by: Makoto Furukawa (Japanese); John Wesley Go (English)
Takayuki Sakurai (桜井 隆幸, Sakurai Takayuki)
Voiced by: Takahiro Sakurai (Japanese); Aaron Roberts (English)
Sakura Muroi (室生 さくら, Muroi Sakura)
Voiced by: Yuko Kaida (Japanese); Morgan Garrett (English)
Aya Katsuragi (桂木 あや, Katsuragi Aya)
Voiced by: Kaori Nazuka (Japanese); Mikaela Krantz (English)
Maki's mother. She got a divorce when Maki was very young and has been working long hours to support him.
Kenji Kyobate (京終 健二, Kyōbate Kenji)
Voiced by: Kazuya Nakai (Japanese); Brandon Potter (English)
Maki's father and Aya's ex-husband. He is unemployed and abusive towards Maki. He is the main antagonist of the series.
Ryoma Shinjo (新城 涼真, Shinjō Ryōma)
Voiced by: Masaya Matsukaze (Japanese); Chris Wehkamp (English)
Toma's mother (柊真の母)
Voiced by: Ryoka Yuzuki (Japanese); Kristin Sutton (English)
Takeru Tanaka (田中 丈塁)
Voiced by: Shōya Chiba (Japanese); Orion Pitts (English)
Takeru is a student of the Misaki Academy boy's soft tennis team and friends with Masato Nagano.

== Production and release ==
On April 5, 2018, studio Eight Bit announced via Twitter that it was collaborating with Kazuki Akane to produce a new original anime. Akane is writing and directing the series, and Itsuka is providing the original character designs. Yūichi Takahashi is serving as the series' chief animation director, character designer, and series animation director. Additionally, Miki Takeshita is in charge of scene setting, Shiori Shiwa is serving as art director, and Jin Aketagawa is serving as sound director at Magic Capsule. FlyingDog is producing the series' music. Instrumental band Jizue is composing the series' music. The series is listed for 12 episodes. Megumi Nakajima performed the series' opening theme song "Suisō", while AIKI from bless4 performed the series' ending theme song "Kago no Naka no Bokura wa".

The series aired from October 10 to December 26, 2019, and was broadcast on TBS, BS-TBS, and other channels. Funimation has licensed the series for a simuldub. From May 31, 2022, the series was moved to Crunchyroll, a streaming service that Funimation's parent company Sony Pictures Television acquired in 2021.

In October 2019, two dancers accused the show of plagiarizing their choreography for the ending sequence, and their posts went viral on Twitter. In response, TBS Entertainment issued an apology to the dancers.

After the final episode, Kazuki Akane revealed, in December 2019, that the anime was originally planned to be 24 episodes, but the production committee had decided to cut down the length of the series last minute. Akane promised that he would find another way to wrap up his original story through a sequel.

On January 31, 2020, it was announced that there would be a Special Collaboration Movie and a Special Fan Movie. On May 18, 2020, it was announced that the Special Fan Movie had been completed. The Special Fan Movie was released on May 20, 2020, and takes place two years after the end of the series.

In April 2021, Kazuki Akane said he has been unable to find a company that will fund more episodes of Stars Align.

=== Episodes ===
No.	Title	Original release date
1	"Episode 1"	October 10, 2019
The boys soft tennis club faces dissolution due to the lack of results and skill. Desperate for new members with athletic ability, Toma Shinjo leads a recruitment drive and come up empty. He approaches the transfer student Maki Katsuragi after watching him catch a stray cat, but Maki declines, not wanting to join any clubs. Toma follows Maki around insistent on recruiting him and Maki agrees with the condition that he gets paid. That night, Maki's father, Kenji Kyotabe, arrives at Maki's apartment and beats him before stealing money that Maki had hidden from him and leaving.
2	"Episode 2"	October 17, 2019
Maki comes to his first soft tennis practice and is teased by the other members, who doubt his skills at tennis. Tsubasa attempts to haze him by ordering him to run 20 laps, and Rintaro, the vice captain, instructs the whole club to run with him. The others fall behind, but Maki and Toma finish together, cementing their partnership. In school the next day, Maki notices Yuta Asuka watching him and Toma and confronts him. He confirms his suspicions that Yuta has a crush on Toma, and reassures him that he's free to like whoever he wants. He asks him if Yuta has any interest in soft tennis and convinces him to become the team manager.
3	"Episode 3"	October 24, 2019
The soft tennis club begins playing practice matches with Maki and Toma paired up. Despite being a beginner, Maki outplays everybody, but struggles with shots aimed at him. After watching how poorly the team plays, Maki chastises them for wasting their time. Toma agrees with him and rage-quits the club. The next day, fellow player Itsuki Ameno is bullied by two students about his family situation, leading him to hit one of them with his racket. While Rintaro and Itsuki talk to their advisor about the bullying, the rest of the team tells Maki that Itsuki's mother poured boiling water on him while he was a toddler. Later, Maki calls Toma and tells him that as he still wants to be paid, he refuses to acknowledge Toma quitting. Toma attends practice the next day.
4	"Episode 4"	October 31, 2019
Maki changes up the pairings for the club opting to balance the teams from top to bottom, and after some heavy initial criticism, the club members see a great improvement in their performances. After school, Maki invites Toma, Yuta, and Kanako over for dinner at his home and they are impressed with his cooking. The next day, club advisor Takayuki Sakurai announces to the team that they will be playing a practice match against Misaki Academy's elite soft tennis club, national champions in team competition. While the team sees this as just a match they have no chance at winning, Maki views this as an opportunity to practice with the best. That night on his way home from the grocery store, Maki finds Kenji waiting for him. Kenji breaks his racket and tells Maki to have money ready for him the next day.
5	"Episode 5"	November 8, 2019
The next day at school, Maki opens up to Toma about his father and family situation. After school, Kenji arrives at the apartment where Toma is waiting with Maki. Toma flings money at Kenji and tells him that if he hurts Maki, he'll kill him. Kenji laughs and threatens to kill Toma first, at which point Maki, who had been huddled behind Toma, stands between them and tells his father he will kill him if he hurts Toma. The next day, Rintaro Futsu tells Toma that he wants to step down as vice president as he feels Maki is doing more to help the club than he is. When pressed, he reveals to Toma that he is an illegitimate child resulting from a teen pregnancy and was put up for adoption because her mother did not feel she could care for him. He had lived most of his life unaware of the truth, but once he was told, he decided that he needed to strive for success in all areas so as not to be a disappointment to his parents, leading to self-confidence problems.
6	"Episode 6"	November 14, 2019
The club arrives at Misaki Academy for their practice matches. Up first are Nao Tsukinose and Taiyo Ishigami and after taking the first set, they drop the next three to lose the match 3-1. Next are Rintaro and Itsuki, and like the first pair, they lose their match 3-1. Next are Tsubasa Soga and Shingo Takenouchi, whose intimidation tactics allow them to win a set but ultimately lose 3-1. Finally, Maki and Toma play against the team's top second year team, consisting of Arashi Oji and Shinjuro Sunaga. The two quickly fall behind, dropping the first two sets due to their inability to return Oji's serves.
7	"Episode 7"	November 21, 2019
Maki notices that Oji and Sunaga are not working as a team, with Oji doing the work while treating Sunaga as an accessory. Maki and Toma expose this weakness to win the next two sets and force a decisive fifth set. The final set is tightly contested, as Oji and Sunaga finally begin working together as a team. In the end, Maki and Toma lose their match, but despite the club's performance, the boys come away greatly encouraged. Some time later, Sakurai treats the club to a barbecue by the river and the team does a victory jump. However, the mother of one of the boys approaches the school's principal complaining about the amount of time her son spends practicing soft tennis and demands action be taken.
8	"Episode 8"	November 28, 2019
Nao's mother launches a complaint to the school's principal, resulting in club activities being suspended for a week. Unable to practice, the club decides to scout out Joy Kusakabe, the ace of Hatanouka Middle School, their first opponent in the summer tournament. However, the school forbids observers, so Yuta suggests they infiltrate the crowds of girls that gather outside the courts to spy on Joy. He and Maki dress as girls, and he confides to Maki that he identifies as nonbinary. Maki tells him he shouldn't feel pressured to label himself as male or female, and tells him about Shou, a FTM friend of his mom. Yuta tells Maki that their older sisters refer to them as Yu, and Maki decides to call them Yu as well. On the way to Hatanouka, the club runs into Takuto Murakami, who quit the soft tennis club to play basketball and attempts to hit on Maki and Yu. The club arrives at Hatanouka and Kanako distracts the girls watching him to allow Maki and Yu to videotape the team. The club reviews the footage and realizes that their attitude towards the sport must change if they want to stand a chance in the tournament. Kanako meets with the club advisor, who also happens to be the art teacher, and shows him her drawings, telling him that her parents don't see art as a worthwhile profession. Later, club activities resume and a practice match is arranged between the girls and boys team.
9	"Episode 9"	December 5, 2019
Shingo's sister An comes to Shijo Minami to watch the practice match between the boys and girls teams; however, she goes missing before the match. They boys frantically search for her, realizing that the practice match will be cancelled if she can't be found. Nao finds her in the infirmary, but the mental stress his mother has been placing him under causes him to lock her in and lie to the boys about finding her. Maki realizes that Nao is lying and takes the key, then finds her safely asleep in the infirmary. The matches go on as scheduled with the boys giving positive results. Later that day, Tsubasa goes home and is harshly reprimanded by his father for quitting soccer to play tennis. His father slaps him, causing him to lose his footing and fall down the stairs, breaking his wrist. He runs out of the house and goes to Shingo's house. Shingo's father takes him to the hospital and the doctors tells them he will be unable to play tennis for two months.
10	"Episode 10"	December 12, 2019
With Tsubasa unable to play, Shingo decides to withdraw from the tournament. The team is distressed about the loss of their pair, and the Tsukinose-Ishigami pair agree to let the other pairs handle scoring wins, but Shingo orders them not to slack off. While Maki and Toma are on a shopping trip, they run into Oji, who goads Maki into making him noodles. They then run into the Itsuse brothers, the defending national pair champions from the last year's tournament, and they taunt Oji. The next day at practice, Kinuyo visits the club and tells them that to save the club, they need to win only one match, which seems to be difficult given the bracket for the tournament. The day of the tournament arrives, and first up are Rintaro and Itsuki. While they take a 2-0 lead, Rintaro's leg cramps up and they lose the match. Next are Nao and Taiyo, who employ a strategy that involves running across the court to prevent their opponents from reading their movements. They take the match to the fifth set, but run out of stamina and lose the match.
11	"Episode 11"	December 19, 2019
With the club's future on the line, Maki and Toma face Joy. The two fall behind early, but they notice that Joy's partner is a liability and they direct the ball at him to win the match. They win their next two matches, leading them to play against the defending champions, the Itsuse brothers. While the tournament is going on, Nao's mother decides that she will let things slide for that day but will ultimately regain control of him, and Rintaro receives a message from his biological mother, who came to watch his match but left before meeting him face to face.
12	"Episode 12"	December 26, 2019
Maki and Toma get shut out in the first two games. They switch positions to throw the Itsuse brothers off their game and force a decisive fifth game. However, the Itsuse brothers regain their composure and win the match. Despite the loss, Maki and Toma gain the spectators' support with their efforts against the defending champions. Toma tries to call Ryoma to share the news, but he reaches his mother instead, who tells him that she's getting a divorce and will be living with Ryoma while Toma lives with his father. She tells him that she'll be relieved to be free of him, as she hates him. That night, Maki returns home to the aftermath of an altercation, finding a broken glass on the floor as well as Shou, his mother's friend. Realizing that his father stopped by for more money, Maki decides that in order to be free of his father's theft and abuse, he must kill him. He purchases a knife and walks to his father's apartment.

== Reception ==
This series was received positively. In the fall 2019 preview guide, by Anime News Network, of the anime's first episode, Rebecca Silverman was concerned that the series may not be able to weave together a sports drama and a "story about dysfunctional families" and the character's designs, but wanted to continue watching it. Theron Martin said he couldn't see himself continuing to watch this series, and seemed to be a "pretty typical sports show title" at first, but has a possibility of "deeper meaning." Nick Creamer was more positive, praising the visual effects, method of conveying drama and information through animation, and its lightly illustrated but "truly biting family drama." Michele Liu, of the same site, said that although the series touches on "various kinds of trauma and abuse without much subtlety," She argued that the series excelled at showing that the struggles of Yū Asuka were not different from struggles by their peers from parental pressure, and called Yū a "wonderful character" and an "absolute angel." ANN reviewers would also praise the series for its "stellar character writing" and having one of the most "heartfelt and sincere representations of LGBTQ+ youth in a long time."

The series would also be listed by ANN reviewers as among the best anime of 2019. For instance, Jacki Jing and Lynzee Loveridge listed the series as the best anime of the fall 2019 season, and said that the series is "bound to be a tear-jerker." In another post, Loveridge praised the series, saying its "real heart is the players and their personal struggles" when authority figures box in the team, and noted that the emotional core of the series resonated with her, and said the series "humanity is its greatest strength." Creamer would also list it as one of the best anime of 2019, saying that the series' director, Kazuki Akane, turned his "consistent passion for messy character stories to a fairly grounded premise," and praised it for mixing character and sports drama effortlessly, becoming "one of the best sports anime of recent years." S.M. Balding for Anime Feminist also praised the series for going beyond usual sports anime to examine the "personal lives, identities, and relationships with the adults" that each of the characters has. They cited Yuu as an example of how anime can meaningfully and respectfully incorporate "LGBTQ+ characters and the challenges they face into their stories," including subverting typical narrative for queer characters in anime, does not victimize them, and lets Yuu be more than their identity, while identifying themselves in the way they see fit.
