= Haruka Nakamura (composer) =

Japanese musician and composer

Haruka Nakamura, (stylized haruka nakamura) is a Japanese composer, producer, pianist, and guitarist who lives in Tokyo. Across his music career, Nakamura has worked with the likes of Nujabes, Aimer, and Ichiko Aoba, among others. Nakamura started his professional music career by uploading music to MySpace. He is now signed to the Singaporean label 'KITCHEN. LABEL'. He has composed for brands like The North Face as well as for television and anime, including Hikikomori Sensei, Trigun Stampede, and the film adaptation of Look Back.

== Early life ==
Nakamura was born in Aomori Prefecture in 1982. While living there, he picked up piano at age 5 and guitar in middle school. He began uploading music to the social media and music sharing platform MySpace in 2006.

== Career ==
Nakamura released his first studio album, Grace, in 2008.

Some of Nakamura's compositions could be described as downtempo electronica or Nujabes-inspired jazzy hiphop such as his 2010 appearance on the tribute album Modal Soul Classics II, 2011's posthumous Spiritual State, and his own record, 2013's Melodica. Meanwhile Haruka Nakamura's earliest and newer work has generally stuck to an evergreen sound inspired by jazz, romantic impressionists, and post-classical chamber music, with tone pictures comprised from layers of delicate guitars, pianos, vocals, and occasional percussion.

2014 marked the start of the haruka nakamura PIANO ENSEMBLE project with 音楽のある風景 (lit. 'Landscape with Music'), which reappeared alongside the live album Hikari in 2017. The ensemble was a mixed group including a chorus, several wind and string instruments, and a percussionist, many of which are Nakamura's contemporaries such as CANTUS and AOKI, hayato. The group went on a live concert tour which concluded at St. Mary's Cathedral, Tokyo.

In 2017, Nakamura was credited for arranging and playing piano on "Liberoara" from the Ancient Magus' Bride soundtrack with Miu Sakamoto.

In 2021, he worked from a studio called "studio camel house" in Kōfu, Yamanashi Prefecture with collaborators Gen Tanabe and orbe. That same year, he was brought on as the composer for the NHK TV drama Hikikomori Sensei.

2023 saw Nakamura collaborate with Salyu for the opening to the 3D TV anime series Trigun Stampede. Nakamura also composed the score and theme song for a 2024 anime film adaptation of Tatsuki Fujimoto's one-shot manga Look Back.

== Discography ==
=== Studio albums ===
- Grace (2008)
- Twilight (2010)
- 12 & 1 Song (2011)
- Melodica (2013), featuring Nujabes, Substantial, and Shing02
- 音楽のある風景 (Ongaku no Aru Fuukei, lit. 'Landscape with Music') (2014)
- Still Life (2020)
- Still Life II (2020)
- Nujabes PRAY Reflections (2021), Nujabes tribute
- archē (2023)

=== Collaborative studio albums ===
- Afterglow (2007), with Akira Kosemura
- Meteor (流星) (2012), with Ichiko Aoba
- FOLKLORE, with AOKI, hayato
  - March 16, 2012 (2015)
  - Folklore (2015)
- Kanata (2019), with baobab
- Orbe / Orb Feat. Luca (2020), with orbe, Luca, and Gen Tanabe
- the world (2020), with LUCA
- orbe I (2022), with orbe
- melodica (2023), with nica

=== Live albums ===
- Kanata no tabi (Live at Yokohamam Port Opening Memorial Hall) (2020), with baobab
- unuunu (LIVE PAINTING at kadensya, TOKYO 2018) (2022), with mirocomachiko
- ‘光’ / Hikari (2017), as the haruka nakamura PIANO ENSEMBLE

=== Soundtracks ===
- Hikikomori Sensei (2021)
- Hikikomori Sensei season 2 (2024)
- Echoes of Motherhood (2025)

=== EPs ===
- 聖者の行進 (2023), with Salyu
- I'll (2018)
- CURTAIN CALL (2016)
- Atarashi Hikari / 新しき光 (2021)

=== Compilations and remasters ===
- stardust album (2018)
- 12 & 1 SONG (Remastered LP Edition) (2022)
- spring & fall -Light years- (Remastered Best / THE NORTH FACE Sphere) (compilation) (2023)
- winter & summer -Light years- (Remastered Best / THE NORTH FACE Sphere) (compilation) (2023)
- CASA (remastered version) (2023), with Kadan

=== Brand Partnership Albums ===
- The North Face Sphere
  - Light years (THE NORTH FACE Sphere 2022 S/A) (2022)
  - those days (-Light years II- THE NORTH FACE Sphere A/W) (2022)
  - from dusk to the sun (-Light years III- THE NORTH FACE Sphere M/N) (2022)
  - SUN.Light (-Light years IV- THE NORTH FACE Sphere S/L) (2023)
- Tsutaya Books
  - AOIMORI - music for TSUTAYA BOOKS (2023)
  - AOIMORI II - music for TSUTAYA BOOKS (2023)
