= Polyrhythm Addicts =

American hip hop group

- Origin: New York City, U.S.
- Genres: Hip hop
- Years active: 1998–1999; 2007–present
- Labels: Wreck/Nervous Records; Babygrande Records
- Members: DJ Spinna; Shabaam Sahdeeq; Tiye Phoenix
- Past members: Apani B; Mr. Complex

Polyrhythm Addicts is an American hip hop group formed in New York City in 1998. It is composed of DJ Spinna, Shabaam Sahdeeq and Tiye Phoenix. Previously, the group included Apani B, who was replaced by Phoenix, and Mr. Complex, who died in 2026.

Polyrhythm Addicts began as a collaborative project set up by Nervous Records that united several New York City rappers for one single, "Not Your Ordinary." The reception paved the way for the album Rhyme Related, released in 1999. The group then disbanded to focus on their individual careers, reuniting for the Breaking Glass album, released in 2007.

The group's debut is an Allmusic album pick, the review stating, "The tracks included are saturated with quality from top to bottom." Its second album was released on Babygrande Records. Both of its albums feature a guest appearance from Pharoahe Monch.

Mr. Complex died on February 6, 2026.

== Discography ==
- Rhyme-Related (1999)
- Break Glass (2007)
