= Evolution Fight =

Studio album by Cyne
- Released: August 29, 2005
- Recorded: 2004–2005
- Genre: Hip-hop
- Label: City Centre Offices
- Producers: Speck and Enoch

Cyne chronology
| Time Being (2003) | Evolution Fight (2005) | Starship Utopia (2008) |

Professional ratings
Review scores
| Source | Rating |
|---|---|
| AllMusic | 4/5 stars |
| Stylus Magazine | A |

Evolution Fight is an album by hip-hop band Cyne. It was released on August 29, 2005, on the City Centre Offices label. It gained some moderate success underground and in the mainstream. It is considered a classic hip-hop album by many critics and helped Cyne get more public attention.

== Reception ==
AllMusic wrote: "Despite their fundamental vision, further listens will show Evolution Fight to be a deceptively intricate album (check the wonky piano loop that backs the ribbon-blown lyrics on the title track or the off-beat rhythm that backs a gospel sample on 'Up Above'), and that might make it more worthy of the City Centre tag of musical advancement than many more overtly abstract hip-hop albums." Stylus Magazine wrote: "Polemical without becoming condescending, superbly judged without seeming contrived, but most significantly a great listen that bounces you about, knocks you down, engages your head and has you belly dancing with glee, Evolution Flight is easily one of the year’s best releases." CMJ New Music Monthly called the album "consistently enjoyable and party-friendly."

== Track listing ==
1. "Plight About Now" - 2:22
2. "Soapbox" - 2:56
3. "Evolution Fight" - 3:23
4. "Haze" - 3:25
5. "Rousseau" - 3:30
6. "Fuck America" - 2:52
7. "Growing" - 4:04
8. "Rappin'" - 2:14
9. "Automaton" - 2:11
10. "Arrow of God" - 3:54
11. "Running Water" - 3:38
12. "Up Above" - 3:14
13. "Deferred" - 4:43
14. "Moonlight" - 6:07

== Samples ==
- "Plight About Now"
  - "Let The Dollar Circulate" by Billy Paul
- "Soapbox"
  - "War of the Gods" by Billy Paul
- "Evolution Fight"
  - "Smile, We Have Each Other" by The Spinners
- "Haze"
  - "Wherever You Are" by Isaac Hayes
- "Up Above"
  - "Whenever I Call You "Friend" by Kenny Loggins
- "Moonlight"
  - "Take Your Time" by Mantronix
