= Jizue =

Japanese jazz fusion band

jizue
- Origin: Kyoto, Japan
- Genres: Jazz fusion; post-rock
- Years active: 2006–present
- Labels: bud music; Victor Entertainment
- Members: Gou Yamada; Noriyuki Inoue; Kie Katagi
- Past members: Shin Kokawa
- Website: jizue.com

Jizue (ジズー), stylized as jizue and pronounced "Jizu", is a Japanese instrumental jazz-fusion band from Kyoto. The band's name is taken from an alternate spelling of French soccer star Zinedine Zidane's nickname "Zizou".

== History ==
Jizue was formed in 2006 by guitarist Norimasa Inoue, bassist Tsuyoshi "Gou" Yamada, and drummer Shin Kogawa. Piano player Kataki "Kie" Nozomiyo joined the following year. Their music was influenced by post-rock, together with jazz, which led to their present fusion sound. They have performed at large music festivals such as Fuji Rock.

In 2017, they were signed to Victor Entertainment.

== Band members ==
Current

- Tsuyoshi "Gou" Yamada – bass guitar
- Noriyuki Inoue – guitar
- Katagi "Kie" Nozomiyo – piano

Past

- Shin Kokawa – drums

== Discography ==
Studio albums

- Bookshelf (2010)
- novel (2012)
- journal (2013)
- shiori (2014)
- story (2016)
- ROOM (2018)
- gallery (2019)
- Seeds (2020)
- Garden (2021)
- biotop (2023)
- Mer (2025)

EPs

- grassroots (2017)
- gnome (2022)
- Lotus (2024)

Live albums

- Jizue Orchestra Live at Kyoto Concert Hall 2019.10.19 (2020)

Soundtracks

- Stars Align Original Soundtrack (Hoshiai no Sora) (2019)
- Gekokujō Kyūji (2023)
- Nine Border (2024)
- Sora Wataru Kyoushitsu (Original TV Soundtrack) (2024)
- La vie en vanille (2025)
- The Monster Within (2025)
- Sharing Kita-kun (2025)

Singles

- "Chaser/Sun" (2011)
- "Dance" (2013)
- "Christmas Comes to Our Place" (2015 – Split with Fox Capture Plan)
- "惑青 / 真黒" (2015 – feat. Shing02)
- "I Miss You" (2017)
- "grass" (2017)
- "trip" (2017)
- "Sing-la" (2018)
- "P.D.A." (2019)
- "because" (2020)
- "marten" (2020)
- "KANAME (feat. Shota Aratani (Yonawo))" (2021)
- "bask" (2021)
- "ARUKAS" (2021)
- "days" (2021)
- "brink" (2022)
- "24/7" (2023)
- "A moving scenery" (2023)
- "Hilarious" (2024)
