= Wafia =

Syrian Australian singer and songwriter

- Born: Wafia Al-Rikabi; 4 August 1993 (age 33); Netherlands
- Genres: Electronica; R&B
- Occupations: Singer; songwriter; musician
- Labels: Future Classic; Warner Music Australia; Nettwerk
- Website: http://www.wafiamusic.com/

Wafia Al-Rikabi (born 4 August 1993) is an Australian singer-songwriter of Iraqi-Syrian origin. Originally studying biomedicine at university, she began to write songs to escape its monotony.

== Career ==
Al-Rikabi signed to indie record label Future Classic, releasing her debut EP XXIX in November 2015. The EP's lead single "Heartburn", produced by Ta-ku, received praise from producer Pharrell Williams being played during his Beats 1 radio show.

In March 2016, she released the single "Window Seat" in collaboration with the New Zealand artist Thomston. Later in August 2016, she collaborated again with the Australian producer Ta-ku, releasing the EP (m)edian. The EP features a story about compromise in relationships, which both Wafia and Ta-ku experienced independently in of each other in their lives.

Wafia released a new single, "Bodies", in late 2017. It was written on the day her family members were denied refugee status for entrance into Australia, which influenced the track's lyrics. However, due to her dislike of pseudo-intellectual feeling music, the track was instead upbeat in contrast to the lyrics in an attempt to make the song accessible.

Wafia's single "I'm Good" was voted number 14 on Triple J's Hottest 100 of 2018.

In April 2024, Wafia announced she had signed with Nettwerk and released single "Background". In February 2025, Wafia will released her debut studio album, Promised Land, preceded by seven singles.

== Discography ==
=== Albums ===
List of albums, with release date and label shown
Title	Details
Promised Land	Released: 7 February 2025; Label: Heartburn Records, Nettwerk; Formats: Digital download, streaming

=== Extended plays ===
List of extended plays, with release date and label shown
Title	EP details
XXIX	Released: 20 November 2015; Label: Future Classic; Formats: Digital download, streaming
(m)edian (with Ta-ku)	Released: 5 August 2016; Label: Future Classic; Formats: Digital download, streaming
VIII	Released: 19 January 2018; Label: Future Classic; Formats: Digital download, streaming
Good Things	Released: 21 August 2020; Label: Atlantic; Formats: Digital download, streaming

=== Singles ===
==== Charted and/or certified singles ====
List of charted and certified singles
Title	Year	Peak chart positions	Certification	Album
Title	Year	AUS	Certification	Album
"Love Somebody" (with Ta-ku)	2016	74		(m)edian
"Better Not" (Louis the Child featuring Wafia)	2018	88	ARIA: Platinum; RIAA: Platinum	Kids at Play
