= Pretty Dark Things =

Studio album by Cyne
- Released: 2008
- Recorded: 2008
- Genre: Hip-hop
- Label: Hometapes

Cyne chronology
Starship Utopia (2008)	Pretty Dark Things (2008)	Water for Mars (2009)

Professional ratings
Review scores
Source	Rating
PopMatters	7/10 stars
Treblezine	favourable

Pretty Dark Things is the fifth studio album by American hip-hop group, Cyne.

== Track list ==
1. Just Say No
2. Runaway, The
3. Calor
4. Escape
5. Money Parade
6. Pretty Black Future
7. Elephant Rome
8. Dance, The
9. Opera
10. Prototypes
11. Fuzzy Logic
12. Never Forget Pluto
13. Pianos On Fire
14. Radiant Cool Boy
15. Excite Me
16. Scattered
