= Nujabes =

Japanese hip-hop producer (1974–2010)

Nujabes 山田 淳
- Nujabes in 2008

Background information
- Also known as: Jun Seba, Dimension Ball
- Born: Jun Yamada; February 7, 1974; Nishi-Azabu, Minato, Tokyo, Japan
- Died: February 26, 2010 (aged 36) Shibuya, Tokyo, Japan
- Genres: Jazz rap; breakbeat; downtempo
- Occupations: Record producer; audio engineer; DJ; composer; arranger
- Instruments: Turntables; sampler; drum machine; flute
- Years active: 1995–2010
- Label: Hydeout Productions
- Website: Hydeout Productions
- Resting place: Tama Cemetery; Tokyo, Japan

Jun Seba (Japanese: 瀬葉 淳, Hepburn: Seba Jun; February 7, 1974 – February 26, 2010), born Jun Yamada (山田 淳), better known by his stage name Nujabes (/nuːdʒəˈbɛs/; ヌジャベス, Nujabesu [nɯ.(d)ʑaꜜbe.sɯ]), was a Japanese music producer best known for his atmospheric instrumental mixes sampling from hip-hop, soul, and jazz, as well as incorporating elements of trip hop, breakbeat, downtempo, and ambient music.

Seba released two studio albums during his lifetime: Metaphorical Music (2003) and Modal Soul (2005), while the album Spiritual State was released posthumously in 2011. He was the founder of the independent label Hydeout Productions and released two collection compilations: Hydeout Productions 1st Collection (2003) and 2nd Collection (2007). Additionally, Seba collaborated on the soundtrack for Shinichirō Watanabe's anime series Samurai Champloo (Music Record: Departure and Impression) in 2004.

Seba was an intensely private person and was a reluctant public figure throughout his career, who wanted the focus to be on his music and not on himself. He avoided interviews, promotional activities and so few were his photos that many fans were not even sure what he looked like. In 2010, Seba died in a traffic collision at the age of 36. Although relatively underground during his lifetime, Seba has since achieved posthumous acclaim and been referred as the "godfather" of lo-fi hip hop.

== Life and career ==
=== 1974–1998: Early life and career beginnings ===
Seba was born as Jun Yamada on February 7, 1974, in the Nishi-Azabu district of Minato in central Tokyo, Japan. He grew up in eastern Tokyo.

Seba's father worked for the National Tax Agency, but was an amateur jazz pianist and exposed him to music at a young age. Seba dabbled in music-making since high school and studied design at the Nihon University College of Art.

In 1995 (shortly after graduating, at the age of 21) much to the dismay of his father but supported by his mother, Seba opened a record store in Shibuya called Bongo Fury Records, later renamed to Guinness Records. The selection skewed away from commercial releases, mostly featuring underground hip-hop.

While operating Guinness Records, Seba began exploring different aspects of the music industry. In 1996 he started writing for music magazines under the pen name Seba Jun. Then, under the moniker Dimention Ball, he started making his own beats and pressing them into vinyl to sell in the store.

=== 1998–2003: The start of Hydeout Productions and early collaborations ===
In 1998, he founded an independent record label first known as Hyde Out Recordings, then as Hyde Out Productions, and ultimately renamed to Hydeout Productions. In the same year, he released a 36-track mixtape titled Sweet Sticky Thing ~Reload All Good Music From Old To The New~. The name was a nod to Ohio Players's homonymous track in their seminal album Honey. This was the first full-length work to be signed under the moniker Nujabes (his name spelled backwards).

In 1999 he released his first 12" recording, Ain't No Mystery, in collaboration with Verbal (at the time known as L Universe). In the same year he also released Peoples Don't Stray in collaboration with Funky DL. In 1999 he discovered Substantial through the mutual friend, rapper, and employee of the store, Sphere of Influence , and in 2000, he flew Substantial to Japan to collaborate for a month on what would become Substantial's debut album: To This Union A Sun Was Born. Both Funky DL and Substantial would go on to become lifelong collaborators.

In 2000 he met the MC Shing02 in Tokyo, and exchanged music with him. One track in particular stood out to Shing02, a beat that Seba had created for American producer and songwriter Pase Rock. Shing02, who already knew Pase Rock thanks to a previous collaboration, obtained permission from him to use the beat, and thus, in 2001, the track "Luv(sic)" was born. This was the first track of the Luv(sic) Hexalogy, one of Seba's most popular and influential works. The second track, "Luv(sic) Part 2" followed shortly in 2002, after the September 11 attacks forced Shing02 to stay in Tokyo longer than expected.

Between 2001 and 2004 he collaborated with Nao Tokui, an artist and AI technology researcher, on a shared project called URBANFOREST. Despite spending many days together over the years, experimenting with Max software and listening to new music, they only finished one track together, "Rotary Park", one of Seba's most experimental works.

In 2003 he opened a second record store, affiliated with Hydeout Productions, called Tribe.

=== 2003: 1st collection and Metaphorical Music ===
In April 2003, Seba put together a compilation album from songs produced by Hydeout Productions, Hydeout Productions 1st Collection, which featured artists such as Funky DL, Apani B. Fly, Substantial, Shing02, L-Universe, Pase Rock, Five Deez, Uyama Hiroto, and Cise Starr.

In August 2003, Seba released his debut studio album, Metaphorical Music. Recorded and mixed in Seba's private Park Avenue Studio, the album's initial release was modest, with recognition growing significantly in later years, to eventually become a cult classic.

=== 2004: Samurai Champloo and international recognition ===
Seba was one of the main contributors to the soundtrack of the anime series Samurai Champloo directed by Shinichirō Watanabe, which blended a feudal Japanese setting with modern anachronisms, such as hip hop culture, graffiti, and rapping. This is where he met rapper Fat Jon, who would become a friend, collaborator, and strong influence on Seba's later work.

While Samurai Champloo was met with lukewarm reception in Japan, it was critically acclaimed and developed a cult following in the West, partially due to its soundtrack which was widely praised and was ranked by IGN as tenth among their Top Ten Anime Themes and Soundtracks of All Time. To this project Seba contributed some of the most popular tracks: the opening theme "Battlecry" (another collaboration with Shing02), "Aruarian Dance", which spread virally through the internet, and "Departure" and "Impression" which became seminal works for lo-fi hip hop artists. This success catapulted Seba, who at the time was still an underground figure, into the international spotlight and reached many fans who would later discover his earlier works.

=== 2005–2007: 2nd collection and Modal Soul ===
In 2005 Seba released his second studio album, Modal Soul. Like his debut album, Modal Soul fuses jazzy, smooth rhythms and hip hop, but with more downtempo and a different quality to transitions and mixing that has been attributed to Fat Jon's influence. The fourth track is another installment of his collaboration with Shing02, "Luv(sic) Part 3".

It was also some time after the success of both Modal Soul and Samurai Champloo that Seba would make the move to Kamakura, an ocean-side city an hour-and-a-half away from his original studio in Tokyo. There a new recording studio would be made in the basement of his home and the change of scenery would mark a shift in Seba's musical direction.

In 2007 Seba released another compilation album, Hydeout Productions 2nd Collection. The album featured some of his most recurring collaborators such as Pase Rock, Uyama Hiroto, and Shing02, as well as some new remixes and singles.

=== 2008–2009: Growth of Hydeout Productions and Modal Soul Classics ===
In 2008, Seba would continue to expand his label by reissuing Emanciptor's first album Soon It Will Be Cold Enough and by helping to release two new debut albums: A Son Of The Sun by Uyama Hiroto, and Fallicia by Kenmochi Hidefumi who was recently signed on to the label. It was also during this time that Seba would release another compilation album, Modal Souls Classics, this time focusing on artists he liked and were inspired by at the time. To help design the album covers for these upcoming new releases, Seba reached out to graphic designer Jiro Fujita (FJD) and commissioned him for four covers (three for the new albums by Hydeout and the last one being for a new album he was working on). Seba felt inspired to work with him after seeing his work for the artist Calm, who at the time he considered to be his biggest rival.

Around 2009, another compilation album would be licensed by Hydeout, Mellow Beats, Friends & Lovers, and released through Universal Music. During this time as well, Seba was very active on the social media platform MySpace and would come into contact with Marcus D and Zack Austin (aka Nitsua) who was later signed on to the label to release a debut album, The Art of Music. Seba would continue work on his own upcoming album as well as help Austin to release his up until his death. Because of how involved and how unexpected Seba's death was, The Art of Music got scrapped with parts of it being released years later through Austin's own label, Visioneternal, by means of an EP, B-Sides Unreleased Material, and his debut album Dayscapes.

=== 2010–2013: Death and posthumous work ===
On February 26, 2010, Seba was involved in a traffic collision while leaving the Shuto Expressway in Tokyo. He was taken to a hospital in Shibuya Ward, where he was pronounced dead after efforts to revive him were unsuccessful. Seba is buried in Tama Cemetery, Tokyo.

His death interrupted work on his third studio album, Spiritual State, and his decade-long collaboration with Shing02, the Luv(sic) hexalogy, both of which have been completed posthumously by his friends and collaborators.

==== Spiritual State ====
Spiritual State features work from some of Seba's classic collaborators like Pase Rock, Substantial, Cise Starr, and Uyama Hiroto, as well as introducing Haruka Nakamura. The tracks featuring vocals focus on encouraging messages, touching on themes of perseverance and pursuing one's aspirations.

==== Completing the Luv(sic) Hexalogy ====
After Seba died unexpectedly, many doubted that the Luv(sic) series would ever continue. However, Luv(sic) Part 4 and Luv(sic) Part 5 were very close to completion, and after putting the finishing touches in Seba's recording studio in the basement of his home in Kamakura, they were released by Shing02 shortly after Seba's death in 2010. The instrumental to what would eventually become Luv(sic) Grand Finale was discovered on Seba's cell phone a few weeks after his death. The track was completed once again in the Kamakura studio, and then released on February 26, 2013, on the third anniversary of Seba's death.

== Recognition and legacy ==
Seba was an underground figure in Japan's hip hop scene and was virtually unknown in the West until the success of Samurai Champloo, which propelled his popularity both in Japan and, especially, abroad. While this rise in fame started when he was alive, it significantly increased posthumously thanks to the popularity of lo-fi hip hop in the 2010s and its spread through internet culture, and it culminated with Seba becoming widely regarded as the godfather of lo-fi hip hop. Seba's production techniques and career have also been compared favorably with J Dilla, both of whom coincidentally share the same birthdate.

Frequent collaborator Shing02 paid tribute to Seba, saying he was "a unique talent", "a close friend", and that "he [had] touched so many people around the world, even beyond his dreams". He has since performed at several tribute concerts for Seba, including at the anime convention Otakon in 2019, along with artists such as musician Minmi and rapper Substantial.

On November 11, 2010, his label released a tribute compilation album, Modal Soul Classics II, featuring previous collaborators and covers and remixes of his songs. Several other tribute albums and songs have been released: the 2013 tribute album 25 Nights for Nujabes by Australian hip-hop producer Ta-ku; "Kwiaty dla J", a 2018 tribute song by Polish rapper Zeus; and the track "Nujabes" from American rapper Chester Watson's 2020 album, A Japanese Horror Film.

In 2016 Kei Nishikori, a Japanese professional tennis player, released a compilation album titled Kei Nishikori meets Nujabes that features his favorite pieces from Seba's repertoire. The album reached number 44 on Billboard Japan's Hot Albums chart.

Seba has been mentioned in two songs by American rapper Logic: in the track "Thank You" from his 2018 album YSIV, which was written "over a Nujabes vibe", and in "Perfect" from his 2020 album No Pressure, where Seba was cited as a major inspiration in his production style. Seba was also mentioned by American rapper SahBabii in his 2018 song "Anime World", with the rapper stating in an interview that he admired Seba's music.

The 2022 adventure video game Stray features the song "Cool Down" inspired by Seba's track "Counting Stars".

== Personal life ==
Seba had generally been described as humble, quiet, calm, unassuming, and shy. He also was considered to have strong passions for food and football. Finally, he was known for being uncompromising, meticulous, and a perfectionist when it came to his work.

Seba had two brothers: an older brother who managed Hydeout Productions until its demise, and a younger brother that operates Usagi (うさぎ), a ramen shop in Shibuya that plays Seba's music and is decorated with Nujabes memorabilia. Seba is survived by his wife and daughter.

== Hydeout Productions ==
Hydeout Productions
- Founded: 1998
- Founder: Nujabes
- Genre: Hip hop · electronica · jazz rap
- Country of origin: Japan
- Official website: hydeout.net

Hydeout Productions is an independent record label formerly run by Seba.

Artists:

- Nujabes
- Monorisick (DJ Deckstream)
- Jemapur
- Emancipator
- Uyama Hiroto
- Kenmochi Hidefumi
- Haruka Nakamura
- Ficus (Cloud Ni9e, Kic. & HISANOVA)
- Nitsua (Zack Austin)
- Feng (FK)
- Marcus D
- L-Universe
- Substantial
- Pase Rock
- Shing02
- Cise Starr
- Funky DL
- Apani B

== Discography ==
=== Studio albums ===
- Metaphorical Music (2003)
- Modal Soul (2005)
- Spiritual State (2011)

=== Compilation albums ===
- Hydeout Productions 1st Collection (2003)
- Hydeout Productions 2nd Collection (2007)
- Modal Soul Classics (2008)
- Mellow Beats, Friends & Lovers (2009)
- Modal Soul Classics II (2010)
- Free Soul Nujabes First Collection (2014)
- Free Soul Nujabes Second Collection (2014)
- Luv(sic) Hexalogy (with Shing02) (2015)

=== Soundtrack albums ===
- Samurai Champloo Music Record: Departure (2004)
- Samurai Champloo Music Record: Impression (2004)

=== Collaborative albums ===
- To This Union a Sun Was Born (with Substantial) (2001)
- Bullshit as Usual (with Pase Rock) (2003)

=== Official mixtapes ===
- Sweet Sticky Thing (1999)
- Good Music Cuisine - Ristorante Nujabes (2002)

=== EPs and singles ===
- "People's Don't Stray" (1999)
- Ain't No Mystery (1999)
- "Dimension Ball Tracks Volume 1" (2001)
- Luv(sic) Part 1 - Part 6 (2001–2013)
- "Blessing It / The Final View" (2002)
- "Still Talking To You / Steadfast" (2003)
- "F.I.L.O" (2003)
- "Lady Brown" (2003) UK Ja. #16 (Note: Because the International Japan Songs from Billboard Japan were not launched until the 2020s, "Lady Brown" entered the UK Japan Songs chart in 2023.)
- "Next View" (2003)
- "D.T.F.N." (2003)
- "Kumomi" (2003)
- "Highs 2 Lows" (2003)
- "Flowers / After Hanabi (Listen To My Beat") (2003)
- "battlecry" (2004)
- "aruarian dance" (2004)
- "mystline" (2004)
- "1st samurai" (2004)
- "world without words" (2004)
- "sanctuary ship" (2004)
- "Feather" (2005) FRA Ja. #17, SA Ja. #20, UK Ja. #15 (Note: Because the International Japan Songs from Billboard Japan were not launched until the 2020s, "Feather" charted on them in 2023–2025.)
- "Ordinary Joe" (2005)
- "Reflection Eternal" (2005)
- "Counting Star" (2007)
- "Another Reflection" (2007)
- "Hikari" (2007)
- "Imaginary Folklore" (2007)
- "Sky is Falling" (2007)
- "Spiritual State" (2011)
- "City Lights" (2011)
- "Dawn on the Side" (2011)
- "Sky is Tumbling" (2011)
- Perfect Circle (with Shing02) (2015)
- "Other Side of Phase" (2024), JPN Sales #35

=== Hydeout Productions discography ===
- Nujabes - Sweet Sticky Thing (1999)
- Substantial - To This Union a Sun Was Born (2001)
- Monorisick - Hydrothermal Formation (2001)
- Nujabes - Good Music Cuisine Ristorante Nujabes (2002)
- Pase Rock - Bullshit as Usual (2003)
- Nujabes - Hydeout Productions 1st Collection (2003)
- Nujabes - Metaphorical Music (2003)
- Nujabes - Modal Soul (2005)
- Jemapur - Dok Springs (2006)
- Emancipator - Soon It Will Be Cold Enough (Japanese release only) (2006)
- Nujabes - Hydeout Productions 2nd Collection (2007)
- Various Artists - Modal Soul Classics (2008)
- Uyama Hiroto - A Son of the Sun (2008)
- Kenmochi Hidefumi - Falliccia (2008)
- Nujabes - Mellow Beats, Friends & Lovers (2009)
- Various Artists - Modal Soul Classics II (2010)
- Nujabes - Spiritual State (2011)
- Haruka Nakamura - Melodica (2013)
- Ficus - Black Foliage (2013)
- Various Artists - Free Soul Nujabes First Collection (2014)
- Various Artists - Free Soul Nujabes Second Collection (2014)
- Nujabes feat. Shing02 - Luv(sic) Hexalogy (2015)
- Haruka Nakamura - Nujabes Pray Reflections (2021)
