= Spiritual State =

Studio album by Nujabes
- Released: December 3, 2011 (Japan)
- Genre: Jazz rap, breakbeat
- Length: 60:16
- Label: Hydeout Productions
- Producer: Nujabes

Nujabes chronology
Mellow Beats, Friends & Lovers (2009)	Spiritual State (2011)	Luv(Sic) Hexalogy (2015)

Professional ratings
Review scores
Source	Rating
Sputnikmusic	3.5/5 stars
The Word Is Bond	4.5/5 stars
MuzikDizcovery	A−

Spiritual State is the third and final studio album by Japanese musician Nujabes, released posthumously as a follow-up to Modal Soul. The album was incomplete upon Nujabes' death in February 2010, inspiring those close to him to see it finished. Spiritual State was released in Japan on December 3, 2011, and February 2012 in the United States with 14 tracks.

Reviewing the album, The Word is Bond called it "the perfect follow up to Nujabes' previous projects" and "a gem".

== Track listing ==
No.	Title	Producer	Length
1.	"Spiritual State" (featuring Uyama Hiroto)	Nujabes	6:32
2.	"Sky Is Tumbling" (featuring Cise Starr)	Nujabes	4:29
3.	"Gone Are the Days" (featuring Uyama Hiroto)	Nujabes	6:02
4.	"Spiral"	Nujabes	3:41
5.	"City Lights" (featuring Pase Rock and Substantial)	Nujabes	3:14
6.	"Color of Autumn"	Nujabes	1:43
7.	"Dawn on the Side"	Nujabes	5:15
8.	"Yes" (featuring Pase Rock)	Nujabes	7:51
9.	"Rainyway Back Home"	Nujabes	2:36
10.	"Far Fowls"	Nujabes	4:24
11.	"Fellows"	Nujabes	2:03
12.	"Waiting for the Clouds" (featuring Substantial)	Nujabes	3:52
13.	"Prayer"	Nujabes	3:29
14.	"Island" (featuring Uyama Hiroto and Haruka Nakamura)	Nujabes	5:07

Tribe Edition
No.	Title	Producer	Length
1.	"Spiritual State" (featuring Uyama Hiroto) (Tribe Special Edition Mix)	Nujabes	6:13
2.	"Scorpion Dilemma"	Nujabes	3:55

== Charts ==
Weekly chart performance for Spiritual State
Chart (2011)	Peak position
Japanese Hot Albums (Billboard Japan)	31
