= Baralku (Emancipator album) =

Studio album by Emancipator
- Released: November 17, 2017
- Length: 60:03

Emancipator chronology
Seven Seas (2015)	Baralku (2017)

Professional ratings
Review scores
Source	Rating
Exclaim!	8/10

Baralku is the fifth studio album by American DJ Emancipator. It is named after Baralku island upon which the dead are believed to live in Indigenous Australian Yolngu culture. It was released on November 17, 2017.

== Track listing ==
No.	Title	Length
1.	"Baralku"	3:25
2.	"Ghost Pong"	4:51
3.	"Mako"	4:12
4.	"Daffodil Pickles"	2:34
5.	"Tree Hunt"	4:39
6.	"Abracadabra"	2:31
7.	"Goodness"	5:25
8.	"Udon"	3:46
9.	"Bat Country"	4:28
10.	"Pancakes"	4:47
11.	"Rappahannock"	5:14
12.	"Winter Dub"	4:46
13.	"Time for Space"	7:13
14.	"Sands"	2:43
Total length:		60:03
