= Apani B. Fly =

American hip hop emcee

- Born: Apani Nicole Smith; 17 September 1974 (age 51); Hollis, Queens, New York City, U.S.
- Other name: Apani B-Fly Emcee
- Occupations: Rapper; songwriter; activist
- Years active: 1996–present
- Children: 3
- Musical career
- Genres: Hip hop
- Instrument: Vocals
- Website: Apani B. Fly on SoundCloud

Apani Nicole Smith (born September 17, 1974) known professionally as Apani B. Fly, is an American hip hop emcee.

In 1996 her first 12-inch single, "Estragen", was independently released and shortly followed up by several high-profile guest appearances on projects with Organized Konfusion, Mos Def, Talib Kweli, Pharoahe Monch, Nujabes and MF Doom. Her first full-length album, Rhyme-Related (as a member of Polyrhythm Addicts), was released in 1999.

She opened for acts such as Fugees and Brand Nubian. For the past decade, Apani has remained part of the NYC underground scene with frequent performances at S.O.B.'s, Lyricist Lounge, and the Nuyorican Poet's Cafe.

== Discography ==
=== Studio albums ===
- Rhyme Related (1999)
- Story 2 Tell (2004)

=== Singles ===
==== Estragen / Soul Control (1998) ====
Featuring Helixx & Pri the Honey Dark of Anomalies, Heroine, Sara Kana (a.k.a. Lyric), Ayana Soyini, Jean Grae (f.k.a. What? What?), and Yejide. DJ Spinna is credited with producing the first four tracks (A1–4) on the A-side with another three (A5, B4–5) attributed to GE-OLOGY, while Mike-One took credit for producing the Bonus Cuts (B6–10).

#	Title
1	"Estragen (Clean)"
2	"Estragen (Dirty)"
3	"Estragen (Instrumental)"
4	"Estragen (Acapella)"
5	"Woman In Me"
6	"Soul Control (Dirty)"
7	"Soul Control (Instrumental)"
8	"Soul Control (Acapella)"
9	"Woman In Me (Instrumental)"
10	"Q-Boro Bonus Break 1"

==== The Specialist / Perspective (1999) ====
Featuring C-Rayz Walz and Maylay Sparks.

#	Title
1	"The Specialist (Street)"
2	"The Specialist (Radio)"
3	"The Specialist (Instrumental)"
4	"Perspective (Street)"
5	"Perspective (Radio)"
6	"Perspective (Instrumental)"

==== Tags of the Times (1998) ====
#	Title
1	"Never Too Much (J-Treds)"
2	"Narcotic (Apani B. Fly Emcee)" (Produced by Mike-One)

==== Spot Me (2000) ====
Produced by Celph Titled.

#	Title
1	"Spot Me (Street)"
2	"Spot Me (Radio)"
3	"Spot Me (Instrumental)"
4	"A Million Eyes (Street)"
5	"A Million Eyes (Radio)"
6	"A Million Eyes (Instrumental)"

==== Strive / Progress (2000) ====
Produced by Nujabes.

#	Title
1	"Strive (Radio)"
2	"Strive (Instrumental)"
3	"Strive (Accapella)"
4	"Progress (Dirty)"
5	"Progress (Radio)"

==== Abracadabra (2003) ====
Produced by DJ Spinna.

#	Title
1	"Abracadabra (Dirty)"
2	"Abracadabra (Clean)"
3	"Abracadabra (Instrumental)"
4	"Abracadabra (Acapella)"
5	"Say What" (Produced by Da Beatminerz)

==== Laws (2003) ====
Laws (A1–2) produced by Nujabes, while DJ Deckstream (f.k.a. Monorisick) remixed Strive.

#	Title
1	"Laws"
2	"Laws (Instrumental)"
3	"Strive (Remix)"
4	"Strive (Remix – Instrumental)"

==== No Matter (2005) ====
Produced by Hiro Kunado a.k.a. HIRO.

#	Title
1	"No Matter"
2	"No Matter (Instrumental)"
3	"No Matter (Bassoon Mix)"
4	"No Matter (Bassoon Remix – Instrumental)"
