= Mellow Beats, Friends & Lovers =

Compilation album by Various artists
- Released: June 10, 2009
- Genre: Hip hop Jazz
- Length: 79:58
- Label: Hydeout Productions
- Compiler: Toru Hashimoto

Nujabes chronology
Modal Soul Classics (2008)	Mellow Beats, Friends & Lovers (2009)	Spiritual State (2011)

Mellow Beats, Friends & Lovers is a compilation album of various artists including Nujabes, Uyama Hiroto, Naoki Maeda, Dwele, Golden Boy, Sora, Takagi Masakatsu, Kuniyuki Takahashi, and Rei Harakami.

== Track listing ==
1. Nujabes featuring Giovanca and Benny Sings - "Kiss of Life" 4:53
2. No.9 - "After It" 6:41
3. Chari Chari - "Aurora" 9:28
4. CALM - "Sitting on the Beach" 5:08
5. Ino Hidefumi - "Green Power" 5:18
6. Akira Kosemura - "Departure" 3:13
7. DJ Mitsu the Beats featuring Dwele - "Right Here" 4:48
8. J.A.M featuring José James - "Jazzy Joint" 4:06
9. Sora - "Revans" 5:06
10. Takagi Masakatsu - "Gelnia" 2:56
11. Kuniyuki Takahashi featuring Henrik Schwarz and Yoshihiro Tsukahara - "The Session (Kuniyuki's Piano Mix)" 7:04
12. Rei Harakami - "Lust" 4:57
13. World Supreme Funky Fellows 2102 - "#1 Dub" 4:40
14. Uyama Hiroto featuring Golden Boy - "Vision Eyes" 4:02
15. Grooveman Spot featuring O.C. - "Maintain" 3:59
16. Nujabes - "Child's Attraction (Short Edit for MB Outro)" 3:24
