= Ta-ku =

Australian musician, producer and photographer

- Born: Regan Mathews
- Origin: Perth, Western Australia, Australia
- Genres: Hip hop; instrumental hip hop; R&B
- Occupations: Producer; musician; photographer
- Years active: 2008–present
- Labels: Future Classic; Soulection
- Website: www.ta-ku.co

Regan Mathews, better known by his stage name Ta-ku, is an Australian musician, producer and photographer.

== Life and career ==
Mathews was born and raised in the Australian city of Perth. He is half-Filipino, half-Māori. Mathews attended high school at John Curtin High School. Before he decided to focus on music, Mathews held a sales job at Medibank for five years. Mathews' stage name "Ta-ku" is a nod to his Māori heritage.

In 2008, an invite to the prestigious Red Bull Music Academy in Barcelona, taking counsel from the likes of DJ Toomp, Chuck D, Bun B, Omas Keith and Dennis Coffey. The trip was a breakthrough moment for Ta-ku as he channeled his experience and new found motivation to liberate a slew of free beat tapes within months of his return. Shortly after flooding the internet with a diverse array of releases, his output was rewarded with subsequent collaborations involving CyHi Da Prynce (G.O.O.D music), John Robinson, Raashan Ahmad (Paper Chain labelmate), Joe Scudda, Outasight, Kid Daytona, Phil Ade, Raaka (Dilated Peoples) amongst many others.

Ta-ku's album Songs to Break Up To was released 8 October 2013. It peaked at No. 18 of the ARIA Album Chart.

Ta-ku has featured on Boiler Room and toured around Australia as part of Listen Out festival in 2014. In May 2015, Ta-ku was a Youth Speaker at TEDxSydney.

Ta-ku made his U.S. live debut at New York's MoMA PS1 in October 2015.

In 2016, Ta-ku collaborated with singer songwriter Wafia to create the album (m)edian.

Mathews was previously a co-owner of Weston's Barbershop in Northbridge and the fashion brand Team Cozy.

In 2018, Mathews started a creative agency called Pretty Soon with friend Ben Wright. Pretty Soon has done work for Red Bull, Puma, Nike, G-Star and Apple.

From 11 February–6 March 2022, Ta-ku's Songs to Experience ran as part of the Perth Festival. The immersive music installation was a reflection of his forthcoming album of the same name.

On 9 June 2023, Ta-ku announced on his Instagram new album Songs to Come Home To, with executive producer Matt McWaters, scheduled for 25 August 2023.

== Discography ==
=== Studio albums ===
Title	Details	Peak positions
Title	Details	AUS
Different Spaces	Released: 2009; Label: Paper Chain (PCPCD002); Format: CD	-
Tribute: Dilla	Released: 26 September 2010; Label: Ta-ku; Format: CD, digital	-
Beat Sketches Vol.1	Released: 2011; Label: Digi Crates Records; Format: digital	-
Latenyc	Released: 5 December 2011; Label: HW&W Recordings; Format: digital	-
Do What you Love	Released: 21 June 2013; Label: Jakarta; Format: digital	-
Songs to Break Up to	Released: 8 August 2013; Label: HW&W Recordings; Format: digital	18
Songs to Make Up to	Released: 2015	
Songs to Come Home to	Scheduled: 25 August 2023	

=== EPs ===
Title	Details
Darker Than Wax	Released: April 2011; Label: Format: digital
50 Days for Dilla (Vol. 1)	Released: 15 March 2012; Label: HW&W Recordings; Format: digital
50 Days for Dilla (Vol. 2)	Released: July 2012; Label: HW&W Recordings; Format: digital
Beast Mode (with Jaden Smith)	Released: February 24, 2015; Label: Self-released; Format: Digital download
(m)edian (with Wafia)	Released: 5 August 2016; Label: Future Classic; Format: digital
25 Nights for Nujabes	Released: 21 December 2018; Label: Jakarta & 823 Records; Format: digital download, streaming
Black & White (with Please Wait & Matt McWaters)	Released: 13 December 2019; Label: 823 Records; Format: digital download, streaming

=== Singles ===
==== As lead artist ====
List of singles, with selected chart positions
Title	Year	Peak chart positions	Album
Title	Year	AUS	Album
"Down to Earth Music" (with Miles Benny])	2011	-	
"1990s" (featuring Drapht)	2013	-	
"Love Again" (featuring JMSN & Sango)	2015	-	
"American Girl" (featuring Wafia)	2015	-	
"Meet in the Middle" (with Wafia)	2016	-	(m)edian
"Love Somebody" (with Wafia)	2016	74	(m)edian
"Leave (Get Out)" (featuring Wafia) (Triple J Like a Version)	2017	-	non album single
"White" (with Matt McWaters)	2019	-	
"Flight 99" (with Please Wait & Matt McWaters)	2019	-	Black and White
"Glitter"	2020	-	
"Cruel" (with Panama)	2020	-	
"Notice"	2020	-	
"Misery" (with terri)	2020	-	
"Smile" (with Xavier Omar, DAISY WORLD & ROMderful)	2023	-	Songs To Come Home To
"Way Out" (featuring Milan Ring, Matt McWaters and ?uestlove)	2023	-	Songs To Come Home To
"Better" (featuring Jay Prince & Billy Davis)	2023	-	Songs To Come Home To

==== As featured artist ====
List of singles, with selected details
Title	Year
"Tasty" (Drapht featuring Ta-Ku)	2013
"Frogs" (Charles Murdoch featuring Wafia, Hak & Ta-Ku)	2015
"Sunflower Love" (Lyss featuring Ta-Ku)	2019

== Awards ==
=== AIR Awards ===
The Australian Independent Record Awards (commonly known informally as AIR Awards) is an annual awards night to recognise, promote and celebrate the success of Australia's Independent Music sector.

Year	Nominee / work	Award	Result
2014	Songs to Break Up To	Best Independent Dance/Electronic Album	Nominated
2015	Songs to Break Up to	Best Independent Dance/Electronic Album	Nominated

=== West Australian Music Industry Awards ===
The West Australian Music Industry Awards are annual awards presented to the local contemporary music industry, put on annually by the Western Australian Music Industry Association Inc.

Year	Nominee / work	Award	Result (wins only)
2013	Ta-ku (Regan Mathews)	Electronic Producer of the Year	Won
2014	Ta-ku (Regan Mathews)	Electronic Producer of the Year	Won
2015	Ta-ku (Regan Mathews)	Electronic Producer of the Year	Won
