= Shing02 =

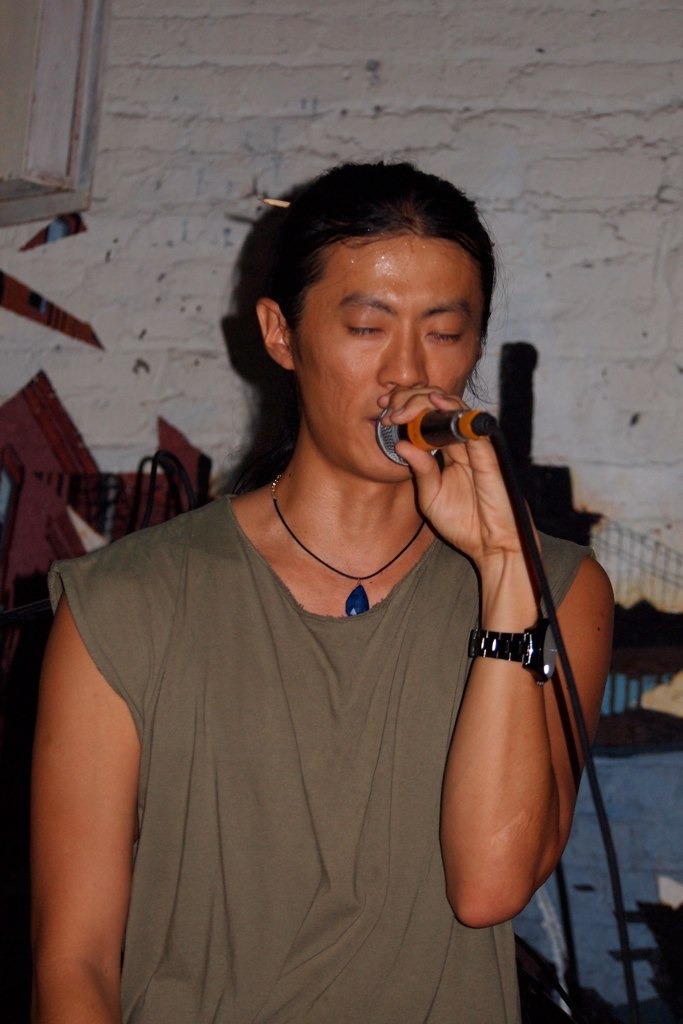
- Shing02 in 2011

Background information
- Also known as: Vector Omega
- Born: Shingo Annen; October 18, 1975 (age 51); Tokyo, Japan
- Genres: Japanese hip hop; jazz rap; conscious hip hop
- Occupations: Rapper; record producer; activist
- Instrument: Vocals
- Years active: 1996–present
- Labels: E22; Mary Joy
- Website: e22.com

Shingo Annen (Japanese: 安念 真吾, Hepburn: Annen Shingo; born 1975), better known by his stage name Shing02, is a Japanese-American rapper, record producer, activist and investor. According to Patrick Neate, his music "has addressed important issues from Japanese ethnicity to sexual exploitation to the education system."

Due in part to growing up in Western cities, Shing02 stands as one of the few multilingual rappers from Japan able to compose songs entirely in either Japanese or English. His rhyming style makes use of lyrics which are largely conceptual in nature and his hip-hop sound is known for blending various influences, ranging from reggae to traditional Japanese music to jazz. The style of music has made him a significant presence within the underground rap community, and he has achieved recognition beyond the scene for rapping "Battlecry", the theme song of the hip-hop-influenced chanbara anime Samurai Champloo, produced by late Japanese jazz rap DJ Nujabes.

== Biography ==
Shingo Annen was born in Tokyo, Japan in 1975 and grew up in various cities in Tanzania and Japan, as well as London. At the age of fourteen, Shing02 moved to Menlo Park in the San Francisco Bay Area of California just following the 1989 Loma Prieta earthquake, where he became involved in various creative arts programs. He then moved to Berkeley for schooling and studied art at the University of California, Berkeley. Living in the Oakland and San Francisco Bay Area, he became immersed in the hip-hop scene amongst direct descendants of members of civil rights movement groups such as the Black Panthers and Asian American activists. Shing02 has said of his music that "it was natural to have political and social messages in my music; I was fortunate to be exposed to it."

Shing02 is well known for his frequent collaborations with the late Nujabes in the early 2000s. As collaborators, the two pioneered a jazz rap music style that inspired the viral "chillhop/Lo-fi hip hop" phenomenon in the 2010s. Together, Shing02 and Nujabes created work such as the "Luv(sic)" series, music for the Adult Swim anime hit Samurai Champloo, and Nujabes' 2005 album Modal Soul.

In 2010, Shing02 teamed up with Japanese-American jazz vocalist Emi Meyer for her second album, Passport. The two initially met via Myspace and Meyer joined Shing02 on his summer tour of Japan in 2008, after which they began work on Passport.

Shing02's remix of the song "Odakias" by Ryuichi Sakamoto was uploaded to Sakamoto's SoundCloud in July 2012.

As of 2020, Shing02 lives in Honolulu.

== Discography ==
=== Albums ===
- Homo Caeruleus Cerinus (1999)
- 400 (2001)
- Waikyoku (2008)
- ASDR (2012) (with Chimp Beams)
- 1200 Ways (2013) (with DJ $hin)
- Zone of Zen (2016) (with Cradle Orchestra)
- S8102 (2018) (with Sauce81)
- 246911 (2019) (with Spin Master A-1)
- Triumphant (2020) (with Jack the Rip)
- 抒情詩歌 / JOJŌSHĪKA (2025)

=== Mixtapes ===
- Shing02 Limited Express Mix (2003)
- For the Tyme Being (2009)
- For the Tyme Being 2 (2010)
- For the Tyme Being 3 (2012)
- Live from Annen Annex (2013)
- For the Tyme Being 4 (2013)
- For the Tyme Being 5 (2017)

=== EPs ===
- Evolution of the MC (2003)
- iTunes Live from Tokyo (2008)
- Jikaku (2013) (with Kaigen)
- 1200 Ways EP (2013) (with DJ $hin)
- Copycats (2020) (with Marcus D)

=== Singles ===
- "A Day Like Any Other" (1998) (with El-P, Murs and Yeshua Da Poed)
- "Pearl Harbor" b/w "Japonica" (1998)
- "The Empire" b/w "Laid in Japan" (1998)
- "Gigabyte" b/w "Streets of Tokyo" (2000)
- "My Nation" (2001)
- "Yukoku" (2002)
- "400" (2002)
- "Y-Song" (2004)
- "2005" (2005)
- "Anoi" (2006)
- "Game" (2007) (with Ghostface Killah and Napoleon)
- "Big City Lights" (2008)
- "Wankyoku" b/w "Katsubou" (2008)
- "The Revolution Will Not Be Televised 2012" (2013) (with Hunger)

=== Guest appearances ===
- The Grouch - "Car Troubles Pt. 2" from Nothing Changes (1996)
- SupremeEx & Tajai - "Contact" from Projecto: 2501 (2000)
- Five Deez - "Sexual for Elizabeth" from Koolmotor (2001)
- Nujabes - "Luv(sic) Part 1" (2001)
- Nujabes - "Luv(sic) Part 2" (2002)
- DJ Top Bill - "Farewell to a Friend" and "Avatar" from Prelude to One Dollar Store (2003)
- Nujabes - "F.I.L.O." from Metaphorical Music (2003)
- Nujabes - "Battlecry" from Samurai Champloo Music Record: Departure (2004)
- Nujabes - "Luv(sic) Part 3" from Modal Soul (2005)
- Pismo - "Velodrome" from Within Transition (2006)
- Rebel Familia - "Ghost Town" from Guns of Riddim (2007)
- Suburban - "Shiori" from Suburban (2007)
- KK - "Lift the Fog Up" from Light in a Fog (2007)
- Goodings Rina - "Daitoshi o Densha wa Yuku" from Daitoshi o Densha wa Yuku (2007)
- Eccy - "Ultimate High" from Floating Like Incense (2007)
- Tokimonsta - "Start Again" from Bedtime Lullabies (2008)
- The Heavymanners - "Taiyo" from The Heavymanners (2008)
- Eccy - "Halo: Ten" from Blood the Wave (2009)
- DJ Baku - "Goooooooooooal!!!!!!!" from The 12 Japs (2009)
- Meiso - "Yomichi" from Yoru no Touzoku (2009)
- Ken Ishii - "Over Driver" from The Works + The Unreleased & Unexpected (2009)
- Lems - "Gala Dress" from Ping Pong Box (2009)
- Candle - "Ragumi" from Tsukimi Soushi (2011)
- Nujabes - "Luv(sic) Part 4" (2011)
- Tamurapan - "Demo Nai" from Worldwide (2012)
- Chimp Beams - "Aquatrium" from Slowly (2012)
- Self Jupiter & Kenny Segal - "Outer Rings" from The Kleenrz (2012)
- I-Dep - "Fuku" from Da Base (2012)
- Kero One - "The Last Train" from Color Theory (2012)
- Marcus D - "One People" from Melancholy Hopeful (2012)
- Nujabes - "Luv(sic) Part 5" (2012)
- Haruka Nakamura - "Luv(sic) Part 2: Acoustica" from Melodica (2013)
- DJ Baku - "Mixture" from Japoneera (2013)
- Lex (de Kalhex) - "Fast Forward" and "Circulations" from Full Cycle (2013)
- Grand Groove - "A Long Way" from III (2013)
- DJ Kou - "Steady Eighty" from My Whole Life (2013)
- Nujabes - "Luv(sic) Part 6" (2013)
- jizue - "Shinkuro" from Shiori (2014)
- Gagle - "Ca La Mode" from VG+ (2014)
- DJ Deckstream - "Young World" from Dress Code (2014)
- Nitsua - "Visa" from Dayscape (2015)
- Ohtoro - "This Is Yuzu" from Kumamoto EP (2016)
- Scholar - "Real Man" from Art of Worth (2016)
- Uyama Hiroto - "South Side" from Freeform Jazz (2016)
- Kenichiro Nishihara - "All These Years" from Sincerely... (2016)
- jizue - "Wakusei" from Story (2016)
- Scott SK Miller - "Sunflower Samurai" from Hiro (2018)
- ALI - "Daze N Sunshine" from Love, Music and Dance (2021)

=== Compilation appearances ===
- "Blank Paper" on Tags of the Times (1997)
- "Ecdysis" on Tags of the Times Version 2.0 (1998)
- "Monster!" on Catacombs (1999)
- "Competition Within" on Strictly Indee (2000)
- "Confessions (of Three Men)" on Tags of the Times 3 (2001)
- "The Clash: A Call to Arms" on African Jag Vol. 1 (2006)
