= Emi Meyer =

Japanese-American musical artist (born 1987)

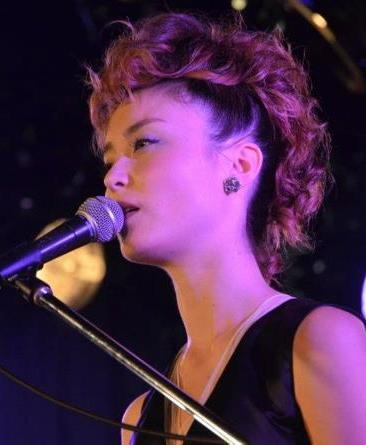
- Meyer performing in 2012

Background information
- Born: Emily Morioka Meyer; 15 March 1987 (age 39); Kyoto, Japan
- Origin: Seattle, Washington, U.S.
- Genres: Jazz
- Occupations: Singer, Producer, Pianist, Composer
- Years active: 2007–present
- Labels: Plankton, Origin, Sony Music Entertainment Japan
- Website: www.emimeyer.com

Emily Morioka Meyer (エミ・マイヤー, Emi Maiyā; born 15 March 1987) is a Japanese-born American jazz pianist and singer-songwriter who is based in Seattle and Tokyo and active in both the Japanese and American markets.

== Early life ==
Meyer was born in Kyoto, Japan, but grew up in Seattle, Washington, United States. Her mother is Japanese and a professor of art history while her father is American. Meyer began learning classical piano at age six but expanded to Jazz. Meyer attended University Prep, a school in Seattle.

Meyer studied ethnomusicology and international relations at Pomona College in Los Angeles County, including Indian ragas, African drumming and Japanese gagaku (classical court music). She wrote her thesis on the division in the modern Japanese music scene between hogaku (Japanese music) and yogaku (Western music).

She first lived in Japan when she took a study-abroad program in the city of her birth, Kyoto. In 2007, Meyer won the Seattle-Kobe Jazz Vocalist Competition, which kick started her career in Japan.

== Professional career ==
Meyer's 2007 self-produced debut album, Curious Creature reached the No. 1 spot on the iTunes Japan jazz chart after the single "Room Blue" was selected as the Single of the Week. She was already actively performing at events such as the Seattle's Northwest Folklife Festival, the Sundance Film Festival and Kobe Jazz Festival.

Living in Los Angeles, Emi has performed around Hollywood, including The Hotel Café. In Seattle, she has performed at The Pink Door, Dimitrio's Jazz Alley and Volunteer Park Amphitheater and in New York at the Rockwood Music Hall as well as the 92YTribeca with The Shanghai Restoration Project.

In 2009, Meyer performed as the opening act for Yael Naim's tour in Tokyo and also played at the Fuji Rock Festival.

For her second album Passport, written entirely in Japanese, Meyer teamed up with Japanese rapper and producer Shingo Annen (better known by his stage name Shing02). The record has influences from Brazil, where overdubs were recorded and incorporates bossa nova and reggae.

In 2011, Meyer released her third album Suitcase of Stones, this time in English and described as a mix of "Jazz, blues and reggae-influenced original compositions" and produced by Grammy winning engineer S. Husky Höskulds (Norah Jones, Yael Naim).

Meyer began her 2011 tour of Japan on May 21, as well as performing showcases at Tower Records stores nationwide. She embarked on the tour despite trepidation after fans sent her messages concerned that artists were staying away from Japan following the March 11, 2011 Tōhoku earthquake and tsunami.

In October 2011, Meyer performed two shows in Seattle, including at the Kizuna Benefit Concert to raise funds for victims of the Tōhoku earthquake via charity organization Peace Winds America.

In April 2012, Meyer's all-English EP LOL was released internationally, including "On the Road," recorded for a Toyota Prius commercial. Considered an uplifting anthem during the recovery, Emi was invited to perform live on the morning television show Sukkiri!! on Nippon TV.

Meyer released her fifth studio album Galaxy's Skirt in 2013, produced by David Ryan Harris. The music video for the title track was filmed by Canon as a campaign for their 4k Canon EOS C500 camera. Songs from the album have been used in television shows including "Energy" for TV Land's Younger, "On the Road" for MTV's Awkward and "Doin' Great" on the Brazilian telenovela, Sete Vidas.

In 2013 she toured as a vocalist with jazz pianist Éric Legnini throughout France including the Le Café de la Danse in Paris. Meyer released a jazz standards album Monochrome, Her latest album Monochrome, recorded at Studio Ferber in Paris and produced by Legnini. Monochrome was released in Japan on September 2, 2015, and debuted at No. 1 on iTunes Japan Jazz. It was released in 2016 on Seattle based jazz label Origin Records, featuring original songs for the US market and called a "gem" by DownBeat Magazine. These additional songs were recorded with Seattle jazz musicians at Paul Allen's home studio Midnight Lamp. A Japanese version of one of the songs Odyssey, was remixed in 2022 by producer Matt Cab as "SURECHIGAI".

In 2014 Meyer opened for Rachael Yamagata in Seoul. Meyer then went on a national tour of Korea and TV appearances in 2016 as part of the Korean release of her album Galaxy's Skirt on Sony Music Entertainment Korea.

In 2019 Meyer performed at Big Feastival on Blur member Alex James's farm in the Cotswolds, UK. Most recently she headlined shows at the Cotton Club and Blue Note Place in Tokyo, 2022.

Most recently, Emi released her EP, The Road to Franklin, in 2020. Collaborating with Keb' Mo' on the track "When I Lose Control", Emi recorded this project in Nashville at the Blackbird Studio. "When I Lose Control" was reviewed that it "perfectly captures some of the experiences and emotions that have come with this global pandemic".

This year, Emi's music will be featured on two films, "Dealing with Dad" and "The Modelizer" for which she wrote and composed the soundtrack and music for.

== Collaborations ==
Meyer is featured on DJ Okawari's track Midnight Train with a music video shot in Tokyo in January 2017. On April 14, 2017, the Nappy Roots released the album "Another 40 Akerz". Meyer co-wrote as well as plays piano and sings on the ninth track "Wings ft. Emi Meyer".

On February 24, 2023, Dan the Automator featured Meyer singing in Japanese on his single "Case Study (feat. Emi Meyer)" under his project Handsome Boy Modeling School with Prince Paul. She will be featured on HBMS's full-length album later this year.

== Production Work ==
In 2022, Meyer produced J-Pop artist Crystal Kay's EP "Start Again" (LDH Japan/Universal Music Group), from which all songs were used for the Amazon Japan TV series A2Z. In addition to production, Meyer also wrote and co-wrote songs with Kay for the album.

== Discography ==
=== Studio albums ===
- Curious Creature (2007)
- Passport (2010)
- Suitcase of Stones (2011)
- LOL EP (2012)
- Galaxy's Skirt (2013)
- Emi Meyer & Seiichi Nagai (2014)
- Monochrome (2015)
- WINGS (2019)
- The Road to Franklin EP (2020)
