= Emancipator (musician) =

American music producer and DJ (born 1987)

- Emancipator in Istanbul in 2013

Background information
- Also known as: Emancipator
- Born: Douglas Appling; May 27, 1987 (age 39); Virginia, U.S.
- Origin: Portland, Oregon, U.S.
- Genres: Electronica; trip hop; downtempo; ambient; chill-out
- Occupations: Producer, DJ
- Instruments: Drums, violin, guitar, keyboard
- Years active: 2006–present
- Labels: Loci Records, Emancipator Music, Hydeout Productions, 1320 Records
- Website: emancipatormusic.com

Douglas Appling (born May 27, 1987), better known by his stage name, Emancipator, is an American producer and DJ based in Portland, Oregon, United States. He launched his music career by self-releasing his debut album, Soon It Will Be Cold Enough, in 2006 while he was a college student. He has released nine studio albums (two of which are collaboration albums), two live albums, five EPs and three remix collections. He also founded his own record label, Loci Records, in 2012 and formed a live band called the Emancipator Ensemble in 2013.

== Early life ==
Doug Appling was born and raised in Virginia, where he studied violin from ages 4 to 12, progressing to electric guitar, drums and bass as a teenager. He cites his father's "eclectic music collection" as sparking his interest in electronic music, while his mother "who'd volunteered in the Peace Corps" exposed him to "African thumb pianos and sounds from beyond the Western palette." He played drums in a rock group in high school that won its prom's "battle of the bands" competition. On how he got his start producing, Appling stated, "I got hooked on [producing electronic music] when I started chopping up loops in Acid Pro for fun in high school." After high school, Doug attended the College of William & Mary in Williamsburg, Virginia, completing an undergraduate degree in psychology. While there, he took a number of classes in music theory, which influenced him as an artist. He self-released his first solo album, Soon It Will Be Cold Enough, under the name "Emancipator" in 2006. Distribution was limited since he burned the CDs at home, sold them via his MySpace channel and "hand-delivered them to the post office every week."

== Career ==
In late 2007, Emancipator came to the attention of Nujabes' Japanese label, Hydeout Productions, which re-released Soon It Will Be Cold Enough in April 2008. Moving to his current home of Portland, Oregon, in 2009, he played his first live U.S. show as the opening act for Bonobo, who Appling admits is "one of [his] favorite producers." This, along with a tour of Japan in 2008–2009, helped to provide exposure to larger audiences both at home and abroad. During this timeframe, he switched from using Acid Pro and Reason to using Ableton Live as his music sequencer and digital audio workstation software for all of his productions. His second album, Safe in the Steep Cliffs, was released in January 2010 on the Hydeout label to some acclaim. Remixes, an album of reworked versions of Emancipator tracks by Blockhead, Big Gigantic, Tor and others, was self-released in 2011. Around this time, Appling began touring with a live violinist, Ilya Goldberg; the duo drew positive critical attention. In 2012, Appling founded his own label, Loci Records, and released the album Drum Therapy by Tor as the label's debut album.

2013 saw the release of Emancipator's third studio album, Dusk to Dawn, his first album on Loci Records. Significant touring and studio work followed the release of the record and a four-piece full-band, Emancipator Ensemble, debuted for live audiences.

In 2015, Emancipator released his first live album, Live from Athens, in June; his second remix album, Dusk to Dawn Remixes, in July; and his fourth studio album, Seven Seas, in September.

Emancipator's fifth studio album, Baralku, was released in November 2017. The album, named for a spiritual island where some Australian indigenous tribes believe the dead reside, was supported by three singles: "Ghost Pong," "Goodness" and "Baralku."

In January 2020, Emancipator released a new single, "Labyrinth," along with the title of his sixth studio album, Mountain of Memory, and announced a tour for the album. At the end of February 2020, Emancipator released his second single off the album, "Iron Ox." On April 3, 2020, Emancipator released his sixth studio album, Mountain of Memory. Later that year, Emancipator released Mountain of Memory Remixes, a remix album featuring reworks of tracks from his 2020 album Mountain of Memory by various producers, including Poldoore, il:lo, CloZee, and others.

== Discography ==
=== Studio albums ===
Title	Release date
Soon It Will Be Cold Enough	January 19, 2006 (re-released April 25, 2008, on Hydeout Productions)
Safe in the Steep Cliffs	January 19, 2010
Dusk to Dawn	January 29, 2013 (Deluxe Anniversary Edition Released on February 23, 2024)
Seven Seas	September 25, 2015
Baralku	November 17, 2017
Mountain of Memory	April 3, 2020
Dab Records, Vol. 1 (with Dab Records and Asher Fulero)	January 29, 2021
Xylem (with Rena Jones and Flowerpulse)	April 9, 2021
11th Orbit (with Lapa)	September 23, 2022
Stories of the Melting Sun (with Lapa)	September 19, 2025
Chrysalis	September 26, 2026

=== EPs ===
Title	Release date
Maps & Father King	November 11, 2016
Cheeba Gold (with 9 Theory)	March 22, 2019
A Thousand Clouds (with 9 Theory)	December 11, 2020
Xylem (with Rena Jones and Flowerpulse)	April 9, 2021
Citrus Fever Dream (with Cloudchord)	July 16, 2021

=== Remix albums ===
Title	Release date
Remixes	June 21, 2011
Dusk to Dawn Remixes	July 8, 2015
Mountain of Memory (Remixes)	October 9, 2020

=== Live albums ===
Title	Album details
Live in Athens	Released June 4, 2015; Recorded live at the Georgia Theatre in Athens, Georgia, on February 22, 2014
Baralku Tour	Released December 13, 2019

=== Singles ===
Title	Song details
"Shook (Sigur Ros X Mobb Deep)"	Released April 20, 2011; Mashup of Sigur Rós's "Untitled 1" and Mobb Deep's "Shook Ones Part II"
"Maps"	Originally released as a track on Soon It Will Be Cold Enough in 2006, this song was omitted from Nujabes's remastered version of the album in 2008. Re-released April 20, 2011
"Father King"	Originally released as a track on Soon It Will Be Cold Enough in 2006, this song was omitted from Nujabes's remastered version of the album in 2008. Re-released April 20, 2011
"Elephant Survival"	Released December 15, 2011; Mashup of Elephant Revival's "Forgiveness" and Marvin Gaye's "Sexual Healing"
"Kids/Truman Sleeps"	Released September 30, 2015; Mashup of MGMT's "Kids" and the theme from The Truman Show
"Ghost Pong"	Released August 22, 2017
"Goodness"	Released September 20, 2017
"Baralku"	Released October 23, 2017
"Cheeba"	Released March 8, 2019
"The Bridge (feat. Lapa, Frameworks & TOR)"	Released August 23, 2019
"Himalayan"	Released March 2020
"Sea To Sky (feat. Murge)"	Released March 18, 2022
"The Painted Lady" (w/ Kishi Bashi)	Released July 24, 2026
"Thirty Three"	Released August 14, 2026
"Koda"	Released September 10, 2026
