= A Son of the Sun (album) =

A Son Of The Sun

Studio album by Uyama Hiroto
- Released: July 16, 2008
- Genres: Hip hop Instrumental hip hop Jazz
- Label: Hydeout
- Producers: Uyama Hiroto, Nujabes

A Son of the Sun is the debut album by Uyama Hiroto, released on Hydeout Productions on July 16, 2008. Although the album is considered as hip-hop, it incorporates jazzy sounds of multi-layered piano, guitar, saxophone, and keyboards, with little vocals involved. The album combines live instrumentation with samples.

== Track listing ==
No.	Title	Producer	Length
1.	"81summer"	Uyama Hiroto	4:02
2.	"Climbed Mountain"	Uyama Hiroto	3:59
3.	"One Dream"	Uyama Hiroto	4:13
4.	"Nightwood"	Uyama Hiroto	3:02
5.	"Waltz For Life Will Born"	Uyama Hiroto	4:51
6.	"Ribbon In The Sea"	Uyama Hiroto & Nujabes	4:24
7.	"Port51 (Interlude)"	Uyama Hiroto	0:55
8.	"Carbon Rose"	Uyama Hiroto	3:35
9.	"Vision Eyes" (featuring Golden Boy)"	Uyama Hiroto	4:03
10.	"Fly Love Song" (featuring Pase Rock)"	Uyama Hiroto	3:58
11.	"Last Transit (Interlude)"	Uyama Hiroto	1:22
12.	"Stratus"	Uyama Hiroto	4:37
13.	"Walk in the Sunset"	Uyama Hiroto	5:15
14.	"Color of Jade"	Uyama Hiroto	2:55

== Credits ==
- Artwork By: FJD
- Executive producer – Nujabes
- Management Production: Takumi Koizumi
- Mastered By: Nujabes
- Mixed By: Nujabes, Uyama Hiroto
- Producer: Uyama Hiroto
