= Substantial =

American rapper

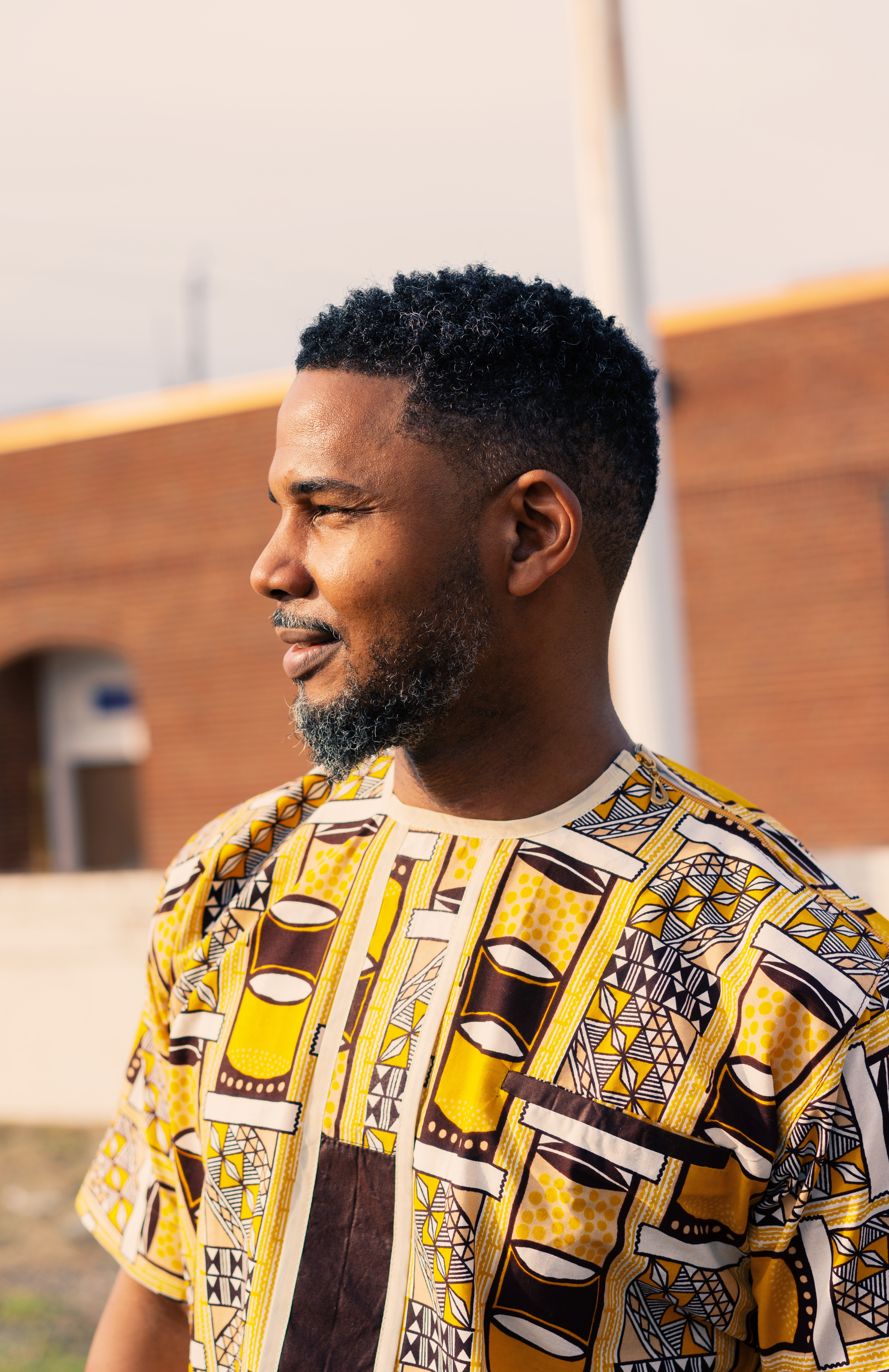
- Substantial outside of Creative Suitland. Photo by M. Jones

Background information
- Also known as: Stan Robinson, SubStan, Subtracktion
- Born: Stanley Robinson
- Genre: Hip hop
- Occupation: MC
- Instrument: Vocals
- Years active: 2000–present
- Labels: Hydeout Productions, QN5 Music, Mello Music Group, HiPNOTT Records
- Website: https://www.iamsubstantial.com/

Stanley Robinson, known as Substantial, is an American hip hop recording artist from Prince George's County, Maryland. He now operates out of Virginia.

His videos have appeared on MTV, BET and VH1, while his music has made it to the second round of Grammy voting in three categories. The car company Bentley reached out to have Substantial's supergroup, FANOMM (with Chew Fu & J-Cast) to create a song for them and perform in China at their car show. Substantial is also known for having been a close collaborator of Nujabes, an influential Japanese producer.

== Personal life ==
Growing up, the first concert Stanley attended was Run DMC featuring Naughty By Nature, and Lords of the Underground.

Substantial has stated that some of his main influences are Native Tongues, Outkast, and Redman.

He is married to Rachelle Etienne-Robinson. They met at Pratt Institute. Substantial and Rachelle are co-CEOs of Substantial Art & Music.

In May 2011 Substantial underwent a preventative surgery to remove a potentially cancerous growth from his large and small intestines. Discussing the surgery Substantial said, "The purpose of the procedure I had on May 10th was to remove the section of my large and small intestines, where the growth was located. As I mentioned before, I don’t have cancer but I have decided to do the […] surgery as a preventive measure."

== Career ==
Substantial gained prominence after collaborating with Japanese Hip-Hop producer, Nujabes (Seba Jun) and signing to his record label Hyde Out Productions. Substantial's 2001 debut album, To This Union A Sun Was Born was a result of this collaboration. The album was a top-10 hit in Japan, and he continued to work with Seba until the producer's death in 2010.

January 2008 he released his second studio album Sacrifice, which was the No. 1 in sales on website undergroundhiphop.com. In February 2008 Substantial was a featured artist on both iTunes and Myspace. Substantial was featured in the Rap/R&B monthly Black Beat Magazine in March 2008 in a full-page feature.

Later in 2008 Substantial's video for his single "It's You (I Think)" received the "Winning Freshman Video" award from MTV. The video was posted on the MTV website, as was the following interview with Substantial.

In April 2013, while recovering from cancer, Substantial produced and released the album titled Jackin' Jill as a tribute to singer Jill Scott. It is composed of 17 tracks built from various Jill Scott songs. Being a free download, the collection of reworks and remixes of her work was blended by DJ Jav, while the artwork drawn by Substantial himself.

Substantial was originally with Hydeout Productions, and later became a member of the company QN5 Music. He was a close affiliate of Mello Music Group, by way of his working relation with music producer Oddisee. In 2014, Substantial signed a multi project deal with HiPNOTT Records where he later became Head of A&R. He now releases music via his company Substantial Art & Music, which he founded with his wife Rachelle Etienne-Robinson.

In 2016, Substantial was featured by the Ford Music Program presented by Mid Atlantic Ford Dealers.

In May 2020, composer Mason Lieberman partnered with Sunrise and Funimation to recreate Cowboy Bebop's ending theme, The Real Folk Blues for COVID-19 relief. This track was released digitally and on vinyl and featured the original series composer Yōko Kanno, original recording band The Seatbelts, Mega Ran, Substantial and a collection of forty other special musical guests. Soon after its release, the track went on to peak at No. 6 on the Billboard charts for "World Digital Song Sales".

In December 2020, Substantial selected by Hip-Hop Wired for iOne Digital's Creative Class.

On January 15, 2021, the Hollywood Music in Media Awards announced their 2020 nominees which included Substantial for his work on the Arknights OST song, Renegade in the category "Outstanding Song – Video Game".

In March 2021, PUBG Mobile released a short film called The Growth via their official Youtube Channel featuring an original song by Substantial, produced and mixed by Obadiah Brown-Beach and Hexany Studios.

== Discography ==
=== Studio albums ===
- To This Union A Sun Was Born (2001)
- Substantial Evidence (2003)
- Sacrifice (2008)
- Home Is Where the Art Is (2012)
- The Past Is Always Present in the Future (2017)
- Seeds (2017)
- The Garden (2018)
- Recompositions (2019)
- Recompositions – Instrumentals (2019)
- Bridges – Instrumentals (2019)
- Dirty Sneakers - Instrumentals (2021)
- Adultish (2023)

=== Collaboration albums ===
- Happy F*ck You Songs (with Extended F@mm) (2002)
- Substantial/Burns (with Burns) (2009)
- The Past... (with The Other Guys) (2015)
- Always (with Algorythm) (2015)
- Bridges (with W3alth) (2019)
- Dirty Sneakers (with T.Lucas) (2020)
- Dirty Sneakers: Relaced (with T.Lucas) (2020)

=== Compilations ===
- Sacrificial Lambs (The Prequel to Sacrifice) (2006)
- Substantial vs Samurai Champloo: Beats, Rhymes & Strife (2009)
- WINK: Something Substantial (2010)
- Jackin' Jill (2013)
- Art Is Where The Home Is (2014)

=== Bop Alloy ===
- Substantial and Marcus D are Bop Alloy (2010)
- The R & R (Remixes & Revisions) (2011)
- Another Day in the Life of... (2014)
- Winter Breaks (2014)
- Present (2016)
- Winter Breaks 2 (2020)
- Masters of the Artistry (2026)

=== Guest appearances ===
- Aim – "Nightlife" from Hinterland (2002)
- Nujabes – "Think Different" and "Blessing It -remix" with Pase Rock from Metaphorical Music (2003)
- Nujabes – "Home Sweet Home" and "Lyrical Terrorists" with L-Universe from Hydeout Productions 1st Collection (2003)
- Nujabes – "Eclipse" from Modal Soul (2005)
- Nujabes – "Hikari" from Hydeout Productions 2nd Collection (2007)
- Kenichiro Nishihara – "Heart" from Humming Jazz (2008)
- Daft Punk – "Make Love" Chew Fu Remix (2009)
- CunninLynguists – "Spark My Soul" with Inverse from "Strange Journey Volume One" (2014)
- Kenichiro Nishihara – "Power of Self" from Life (2010)
- Nujabes – "Waiting for the Clouds" and "City Lights" with Pase Rock from Spiritual State (2011)
- Kenichiro Nishihara – "Rise Son" from Illuminus (2012)
- Haruka Nakamura – "Soar" from Melodica (2013)
- CunninLynguists – "Guide You Through Shadows" with Ra Scion from "Strange Journey Volume Three" (2014)
- Kenichiro Nishihara – "Waves" from Jazzy Folklore (2015)
- Kenichiro Nishihara – "Light up the Dark" with Precious Joubert from Sincerely... (2016)
- Kenichiro Nishihara – "Never Let Go" and "Our Song" from Elastic Afterwords (2019)
- Mason Lieberman – "The Real Folk Blues" (2020)
- Sinitus Tempo & Don Anthony – "Pathways – remix" with Mick Jenkins, Add-2, and Malcolm Jackson (2020)
- Priest Da Nomad – "Proud" with Oddisee (2020)
- Mason Lieberman – "You Say Run" (2020)
- Grant Kirkhope – "DK Rap" (2024)
