= Strange Journey =

Strange Journey may refer to:

- Strange Journey, a 1946 American film
- Strange Journey, a three-volume song album composed by CunninLynguists
  - Strange Journey Volume One
  - Strange Journey Volume Two
  - Strange Journey Volume Three
- Strange Journey: The Story of Rocky Horror, a 2025 American documentary film
- Shin Megami Tensei: Strange Journey, a 2010 video game in the Megami Tensei series
