= Strange Journey Volume Three =

Mixtape by CunninLynguists
- Released: April 1, 2014
- Genre: Hip-hop
- Length: 53:48
- Label: Bad Taste Records
- Producer: Kno, RJD2, Thomax

CunninLynguists chronology
Oneirology (2011)	Strange Journey Volume Three (2014)	Rose Azura Njano (2017)

Professional ratings
Review scores
Source	Rating
Spectrum Culture	3/5 stars

Strange Journey Volume Three is a 2014 mixtape by American hip-hop group CunninLynguists. It peaked at number 37 on Billboard's Heatseekers Albums chart.

== Track listing ==
No.	Title	Length
1.	"Ignition"	0:31
2.	"Strange Universe" (featuring Del the Funky Homosapien)	3:34
3.	"In the City" (featuring Zumbi of Zion I)	3:39
4.	"South California" (featuring Tunji)	3:14
5.	"Drunk Dial" (featuring Grieves and Murs)	3:43
6.	"The Morning" (featuring Blu and Psalm One)	3:50
7.	"Innerspace" (featuring Toby)	4:20
8.	"Miley 3000"	0:39
9.	"Guide You Through Shadows" (featuring RA Scion and Substantial)	4:35
10.	"Castles" (featuring Aesop Rock and Sadistik)	3:51
11.	"Kings" (featuring Sheisty Khrist)	3:18
12.	"Hot" (featuring Apathy and Celph Titled)	2:59
13.	"The Format" (featuring Masta Ace and Mr. SOS)	3:53
14.	"Dying Breed"	3:18
15.	"Makes You Wanna Cry" (featuring Sheisty Khrist)	3:03
16.	"Beyond the Sun" (featuring J-Live)	2:41
17.	"Mission Assessment"	0:41
18.	"Urutora Kaiju" (featuring Tonedeff)	1:58

The CD version and the vinyl version do not include "Hot".

== Personnel ==
Credits adapted from the CD liner notes.

- Kno – production (except "The Format" and "Dying Breed"), additional programming (on "The Format" and "Dying Breed"), mixing, mastering
- RJD2 – production (on "The Format")
- Thomax – production (on "Dying Breed")
- DJ FlipFlop – turntables (on "South California" and "The Format")
- C. Bryan – additional vocals (on "Innerspace")
- Amond "A.J." Jackson – additional engineering
- Mark Borders – additional engineering
- Lofidel – additional engineering
- Nino Moschella – additional engineering
- Chris Miscik – artwork
- Anthony Cole – graphic design

== Charts ==
Chart	Peak position
US Heatseekers Albums (Billboard)	37
