= SouthernUnderground =

Southernunderground

Studio album by CunninLynguists
- Released: April 1, 2003
- Recorded: 2002–03
- Studio: Deacon's Crib (Lexington, KY)
- Genre: Hip-hop
- Length: 1:00:53
- Label: Freshchest
- Producer: Kno (also exec.); Domingo; Freshchest Prose; RJD2

CunninLynguists chronology
Will Rap for Food (2001)	Southernunderground (2003)	A Piece of Strange (2006)

Professional ratings
Review scores
Source	Rating
AllMusic	4/5 stars
Pitchfork	7.4/10
RapReviews	9/10
Spin	A−

SouthernUnderground is the second studio album by American hip-hop trio CunninLynguists. It was released on April 1, 2003, via FreshChest Records. Recording sessions took place at Deacon's Crib in Lexington, Kentucky. Production was handled by member Kno, who also served as executive producer, Domingo, Freshchest Prose, and RJD2. It features guest appearances from Cashmere The PRO, Masta Ace, Supastition, and Tonedeff.

As well as resident vocalist Deacon the Villain and DJ/vocalist Kno, the group employed Mr. SOS to accompany on vocals for much of the album. In addition to these three, other artists from the QN5 record label appear, including Tonedeff.

It is best known for its single "Seasons", featuring Masta Ace, that details the history of hip-hop, comparing different eras to seasons of a year. It also has some political songs, such as "Dying Nation", "War" and "Appreciation", which take a somber, storytelling approach to the September 11 attacks.

It also includes the song "Falling Down", which is based on Falling Down, a film about a man violently making his way across Los Angeles.

== Track listing ==
No.	Title	Writer(s)	Producer(s)	Length
1.	"Intro"		Kno	0:59
2.	"Southernunderground"	Ryan Wisler; Willis Polk II; Domingo Padilla	Domingo	2:38
3.	"The South"	Wisler; Polk II; David Diaz	Kno	3:28
4.	"Love Ain't" (featuring Tonedeff)	Wisler; Polk II; Tony Rojas	Kno	4:01
5.	"Rain"	Wisler; Diaz	Kno	3:14
6.	"Doin' Alright"	Wisler; Polk II; Diaz	Kno	4:39
7.	"Interlude 1"	Wisler	Kno	1:25
8.	"Old School"	Wisler; Polk II; Diaz	Kno	3:54
9.	"Seasons" (featuring Masta Ace)	Wisler; Polk II; Diaz; Duval Clear; Ramble Krohn	RJD2	3:35
10.	"Nasty Filthy" (featuring Cashmere The PRO and Supastition)	Wisler; Polk II; Diaz; R. Johnson; Kam Moye	Kno	4:47
11.	"Falling Down"	Wisler; Polk II; Diaz	Kno	6:33
12.	"Sunrise/Sunset"	Polk II; Gene Gaudenzi; Joe LaPorta	Freshchest Prose	3:39
13.	"Interlude 2"		Kno	1:30
14.	"Appreciation (Remix)" (featuring Cashmere The PRO)	Wisler; Polk II; Johnson	Kno; Cashmere The PRO (co.)	3:26
15.	"Dying Nation"	Wisler; Polk II; Diaz	Kno	3:37
16.	"War"			3:40
17.	"Karma (Bonus Track)"			3:03
Total length:				1:00:53

== Personnel ==
- Ryan "Kno" Wisler – vocals, scratches (tracks: 3, 11, 15), producer (tracks: 1, 3–8, 10, 11, 13–16), re-mixing (track 14), executive producer
- Willis "Deacon the Villain" Polk II – vocals
- David "Mr. SOS" Diaz – vocals (tracks: 3, 5, 6, 8–11, 15)
- Tony "Tonedeff" Rojas – vocals (track 4), additional vocals (tracks: 10, 11)
- Duval "Masta Ace" Clear – vocals (track 9)
- R. "Cashmere The Pro" Johnson – vocals (tracks: 10, 14), co-producer (track 14)
- Kamaarphial "Supastition" Moye – vocals (track 10)
- Loyal Johnson – additional vocals (track 11)
- DJ Tommee – scratches
- Domingo Padilla – producer (track 2)
- Ramble "RJD2" Krohn – producer (track 9)
- Gene Gaudenzi – producer (track 12), engineering, mastering
- Joe LaPorta – producer (track 12), engineering, mastering
