= Archetype (Tonedeff album) =

Studio album by Tonedeff
- Released: April 5, 2005
- Genre: Hip-hop
- Length: 65:23
- Label: QN5 Music
- Producer: Tonedeff; Versifier; Kno; Elite; E-L; Domingo

Tonedeff chronology
Underscore (2004)	Archetype (2005)	Polymer (2016)

Singles from Archetype
- 1. "Politics" / "Disappointed" Released: 2004

Archetype is the debut solo studio album by American rapper Tonedeff. It was released on QN5 Music on April 5, 2005.

== Critical reception ==
Professional ratings
Review scores
Source	Rating
AllHipHop	3.5/5
HipHopDX	8/10
IGN	8.0/10

Jim Durig of IGN wrote, "Archetype is an engaging trip from start to finish, but don't get too comfortable or else Tone's rapid-fire style makes it easy to miss out on his high-caliber lyricism." He added, "His flow is truly one of a kind, though, covering up for the occasional musical misstep." Paine of AllHipHop wrote, "this album may win ears while shunning others, but Tonedeff has courageously delivered his magnum opus with supreme individuality to cut away from a densely populated Hip-hop community." J-23 of HipHopDX described Archetype as "another great, accessibly indy album that should be selling millions instead of most of the shit that's charting."

== Track listing ==
No.	Title	Producer(s)	Length
1.	"Overture"	Tonedeff	2:56
2.	"Archetype"	Tonedeff	2:55
3.	"Masochist"	Tonedeff	4:33
4.	"Let's Go"	Tonedeff	3:36
5.	"Disappointed"	Versifier	4:15
6.	"Loyal"	Kno	5:15
7.	"Porcelain"	Tonedeff	4:39
8.	"Issawn"	Elite	4:24
9.	"Quotables" (featuring Substantial, Wordsworth, PackFM, Session, Supastition, and Rise)	Tonedeff	5:02
10.	"Politics"	Tonedeff	5:16
11.	"Pervert"	E-L	4:13
12.	"Heavyweight"	Tonedeff	3:56
13.	"Children" (featuring Anetra)	Tonedeff	5:22
14.	"Case Closed"	Domingo	3:31
15.	"Gathered"	Tonedeff	5:21
