= Death Is Silent =

Studio album by Kno
- Released: October 12, 2010
- Recorded: 2009–2010
- Genre: Hip-hop
- Length: 44:23
- Labels: APOS Music, QN5 Music
- Producer: Kno (also exec.)

Singles from Death Is Silent
- 1. "Rhythm of the Rain" Released: September 7, 2010; 2. "La Petite Mort (Come Die with Me)" Released: September 27, 2010; 3. "Not at the End" Released: October 6, 2010

Professional ratings
Review scores
Source	Rating
HipHopDX	4/5 stars
Potholes in My Blog	3/5 stars
Prefix Magazine	Favorable
RapReviews	9/10
URB	4.5/5 stars

Death Is Silent is the debut solo album by American producer/rapper Kno, a founding member of the hip-hop trio CunninLynguists. It was released on October 12, 2010. The whole album was produced by Kno and features guest appearances by Thee Tom Hardy, Tunji, Nemo Achida, Substantial, Sheisty Khrist, CunninLynguists members Natti and Deacon the Villain and QN5 Music founder Tonedeff.

== Release and promotion ==
The album was slated for release on October 12, 2010, but due to a UPC conflict with Soulja Boy's Swag Flu mixtape, the release was delayed, and the album was released on October 26, 2010. It was made available for streaming and digital download at Bandcamp, iTunes, and Amazon.com on the original date of October 12. Three singles were released through QN5 Music's web site as free downloads.

Two music videos have been released for the album on YouTube; one for "Graveyard" on November 25, 2010, and one for "La Petite Mort (Come Die With Me)" on November 29, 2010. "Graveyard" was directed by Landon Antonetti, and "La Petite Mort" was directed by Matt Hobbs of Vital Films. The video for "La Petite Mort" is also notable for starring pornographic actress Mia Rose.

The CD for "Death Is Silent" also includes the instrumentals of each track minus two.

== Reception ==
Death Is Silent was received generally well from most music critics. Michael Sheehan from HipHopDX gave the album 4/5 praising the production on the album and saying that compositions on the album feel straight-up cinematic. A. Minor of the beat brake praised Kno's producing skills by saying that the album's production is flawless. He praised the vocal samples Kno used and gave the album 4/5. A URB reviewer went on to say that Death Is Silent is easily one of the top five hip-hop albums of the year and possibly one of the year's ten best, all genres considered.

== Influences ==
"Loneliness" and "The New Day (Death Has No Meaning)" contain excerpts from philosopher and writer Jiddu Krishnamurti's 1980 discussions with David Bohm.

== Track listing ==
No.	Title	Length
1.	"Death Is Silent"	2:48
2.	"If You Cry" (featuring Natti)	3:26
3.	"Loneliness" (featuring Nemo Achida & Deacon the Villain)	3:19
4.	"La Petite Mort (Come Die with Me)" (additional guitar by Willie Eames)	3:31
5.	"Rhythm of the Rain" (featuring Thee Tom Hardy & Tunji)	4:33
6.	"Spread Your Wings" (featuring Deacon the Villain)	3:13
7.	"Smile (They Brought Your Coffin In)"	1:52
8.	"Graveyard" (featuring Sheisty Khrist)	2:52
9.	"I Wish I Was Dead" (featuring Tonedeff)	4:54
10.	"They Told Me" (featuring Deacon the Villain)	4:00
11.	"When I Was Young" (featuring Natti & Substantial)	3:32
12.	"Not at the End" (featuring Tunji)	3:16
13.	"The New Day (Death Has No Meaning)"	3:07
