= Strange Journey Volume Two =

Mixtape by CunninLynguists
- Released: November 3, 2009
- Genre: Hip-hop
- Label: A Piece of Strange/QN5/Bad Taste
- Producer: Kno, J-Zone, Blue Sky Black Death

CunninLynguists chronology
| Strange Journey Volume One (2009) | Strange Journey Volume Two (2009) | Oneirology (2011) |

Singles from Strange Journey Volume Two
- 1. "Running Wild" Released: October 13, 2009; 2. "To Be For Real" Released: October 28, 2009; 3. "Imperial" Released: November 3, 2009

Professional ratings
Review scores
| Source | Rating |
|---|---|
| HipHopDX | 4/5 stars |
| Prefix | Favorable |

Strange Journey Volume Two is the fourth mixtape by Southern hip-hop group CunninLynguists, released on November 3, 2009. The album features guest appearances from E-40, Sean Price, Witchdoctor, Evidence, Geologic of Blue Scholars and Tonedeff, among others. The production is mostly handled by Kno, with contributions from Blue Sky Black Death and J-Zone. Strange Journey Volume Two followed the July 2009 release of Strange Journey Volume One.

== Release ==
In advance of the album's release, the song "Running Wild", featuring E-40, was released for free on the QN5 website on October 13, 2009. A week later, "The WWKYA Tour" remix, featuring Extended Famm, was also released for free on the label's website. 8 days later, the label released yet another free download on its site, "To Be for Real". A deluxe version of the mixtape is available, which contains an instrumental version of the album.

== Track listing ==
All tracks are produced by Kno except where noted.

| No. | Title | Producer | Length |
|---|---|---|---|
| 1. | "Departure" | | 0:31 |
| 2. | "Imperial" (featuring Freddie Gibbs) | | 2:50 |
| 3. | "The W.W.K.Y.A. Tour (Remix)" (featuring Substantial and Extended Famm) | | 4:56 |
| 4. | "Streets" (featuring Sean Price and Poison Pen) | | 3:19 |
| 5. | "Heart" | | 2:13 |
| 6. | "To Be For Real" | | 3:22 |
| 7. | "Tear Trax" (featuring Cashmere The PRO) | | 4:15 |
| 8. | "Still With Me" (featuring Jermiside) | | 2:51 |
| 9. | "Close Your Eyes" (featuring Grieves, Geologic and Macklemore) | | 3:57 |
| 10. | "Pit Stop" | | 0:41 |
| 11. | "The Park" | Blue Sky Black Death | 4:30 |
| 12. | "Nothing To Give (Live)" (featuring Club Dub) | | 3:23 |
| 13. | "Cocaine" | J-Zone | 3:32 |
| 14. | "Running Wild" (featuring E-40 and Evidence) | | 3:34 |
| 15. | "Everywhere" (featuring Witchdoctor) | | 3:13 |
| 16. | "Arrival (Outro)" | | 0:24 |
