= Strange Journey Volume One =

Mixtape by CunninLynguists
- Released: March 24, 2009
- Genre: Hip-hop
- Label: A Piece of Strange Music; QN5 Music; Bad Taste Records
- Producer: Kno

CunninLynguists chronology
Dirty Acres (2007)	Strange Journey Volume One (2009)	Strange Journey Volume Two (2009)

Singles from Strange Journey Volume One
- 1. "Never Come Down (The Brownie Song)" Released: February 2, 2009; 2. "Don't Leave (When Winter Comes)" Released: April 15, 2009

Professional ratings
Review scores
Source	Rating
AllMusic	3.5/5 stars
Potholes In My Blog	4/5
Prefix	Favorable

Strange Journey Volume One is the third mixtape and the first installment in the Strange Journey Series from Southern hip hop group CunninLynguists, released on March 24, 2009. The release features guest appearances from Killer Mike, Khujo of Goodie Mob, Skinny DeVille and Fish Scales of Nappy Roots, Slug of Atmosphere, Tonedeff, PackFM, Substantial, Mac Lethal, Looptroop Rockers, Hilltop Hoods, and former group member Mr. SOS. It is entirely produced by Kno.

== Release ==
The first single, "Never Come Down (The Brownie Song)" was released online on February 2, 2009. The song's music video was released on February 23. The second single will be "Don't Leave (When Winter Comes)", featuring Slug, b/w "Nothing But Strangeness", featuring Looptroop Rockers and Hilltop Hoods. Strange Journey Volume One is the first installment in the Strange Journey series, followed by Strange Journey Volume Two in 2009 and Volume Three in 2014.

== Track listing ==
No.	Title	Length
1.	"Departure (Intro)"	2:05
2.	"Nothing But Strangeness" (featuring Looptroop Rockers and Hilltop Hoods)	3:18
3.	"Lynguistics (Live In Stockholm)"	1:29
4.	"Move"	3:16
5.	"Spark My Soul" (featuring Substantial and Inverse)	3:47
6.	"Never Come Down (The Brownie Song)"	3:42
7.	"Hypnotized" (featuring PackFM and Club Dub)	3:47
8.	"Dance For Me (Remix)"	2:34
9.	"Die For You" (featuring Mr. SOS)	3:50
10.	"White Guy Mind Tricks"	1:00
11.	"Georgia (Remix)" (featuring Killer Mike and Khujo Goodie)	2:55
12.	"K.K.K.Y. (Remix)" (featuring Skinny DeVille, Fishscales, Young Chu and Sheisty Khrist)	2:19
13.	"Don't Leave (When Winter Comes)" (featuring Slug)	4:07
14.	"The Distance" (featuring Tonedeff)	4:13
15.	"Broken Van (Thinking Of You)" (featuring Mac Lethal)	3:56
16.	"Billy Joes Garage (To Be Continued)"	0:56
