= Sloppy Seconds Vol. 2 =

Mixtape by CunninLynguists
- Released: 2005
- Genre: Hip-hop
- Label: QN5 Music/L.A. Underground

CunninLynguists chronology
Sloppy Seconds Vol. 1 (2003)	Sloppy Seconds Vol. 2 (2005)	A Piece of Strange (2006)

Professional ratings
Review scores
Source	Rating
Okayplayer	link
RapReviews.com	8/10 link

Sloppy Seconds Vol. 2 is a mixtape album by the CunninLynguists, released in 2005.

== Track listing ==
1. "Cornasto"
2. "WQN5 Station ID #1"
3. "Play Hard"
4. "The Party" (Skit)
5. "What They Playin? (Blow my High)"
6. "Being Human's Hard"
7. "Fear"
8. "Clap"
9. "WQN5 Station ID #2"
10. "Wachugondo?"
11. "Break Even"Featuring Tripp Doogan
12. "Brain Over Muscle"
13. "Time (What is It?)"
14. "Friendgirl"
15. "Porcelain (Remix)"
16. "Miss Lady"
17. "Til' the End (C.A.L.I.)"
18. "The Talk" (Skit)
19. "Since When?"
20. "Mind Won't Behave"
21. "It's Over"
22. "Be Free (Remix)"
23. "W.C.G."
24. "Diamond Sky"
25. "WQN5 Station ID #3"
26. "What'll You Do?"
27. "Outro"
