= Domingo (producer) =

- Born: September 11, 1970 (age 56)
- Origin: Brooklyn, New York City, New York, U.S.
- Genre: Hip-hop
- Occupation: Hip-hop producer
- Years active: 1987-present
- Labels: Deranged Music Inc; Latchkey Recordings; QN5 Music

Domingo Padilla (born September 11, 1970), known professionally as Domingo, is an American hip-hop producer from Brooklyn, New York. He has produced for some well-known hip-hop artists such as Das EFX, Immortal Technique, and Rakim, among others. He is closely associated with Kool G Rap.

== History ==
Domingo was born and raised in Brooklyn, New York City, and is of Latin origin. He has produced for some of hip-hop's most respected and well-known artists, including Big Pun, Fat Joe, KRS-One, Rakim, Big Daddy Kane, and many more. He is also closely associated with Kool G Rap.

Domingo is one of the most prominent hip-hop producers from East New York, Brooklyn, and began his professional career at the age of 17 when hip-hop producer Marley Marl took him into his production company, the House of Hits, and became Domingo's mentor.

In 1997, with the release of the critically acclaimed KRS-One album I Got Next, Domingo gained his first Gold record based on cumulative album sales. The album went on to sell well over 650,000 copies worldwide.

In 1998, Domingo achieved his first Platinum record for his album Big Pun Capital Punishment. That same year, Domingo was nominated for both American and Latin Grammys for his production work on the album. It has sold 2.3 Million copies worldwide.

Domingo released his first studio album in 1999, titled Behind the Doors of the 13th Floor. The album also featured Eminem, KRS-One, MC Shan, and others.

In 2003, Domingo released his second album, The Difference, which featured the Beatnuts, Dilated Peoples, High N Mighty, and others. It included the Domingo produced song by Krs One entitled "Clear Em Out", which sparked a disagreement between Krs One and the St. Louis rapper Nelly.

In 2007 Domingo, released his third studio album, The Most Underrated. It features Big Daddy Kane, Joell Ortiz, Canibus, Termanology, Immortal Technique, the Beatnuts, Kool G Rap, Brother Ali, and others.

Domingo resurfaced with a new album in 2014 titled Same Game New Rules, featuring Kool G Rap, KRS-One, R.A. the Rugged Man, Sean Price, M.O.P., Prodigy, Chris Rivers (Big Pun's son), Hell Razah, Ras Kass, AZ, Necro, Action Bronson, Sadat X, Rahzel and more.

Also in December 2014, Domingo released an extended play EP recording dedicated to the memory of rapper Big Pun and titled Bronx Legends Never Die.

In 2015, Domingo took the reins as a promoter and created the company That's Hip Hop, which held two sold-out concerts in Pittsburgh, Pennsylvania.

Domingo won an ASCAP R&B award for his participation in the Drake song All Me.

In October 2015, Domingo convinced Brooklyn rapper Joell Ortiz to undertake an album released through That's Hip Hop in early 2016.

In 2017 Domingo released albums from Chris Rivers, son of Big Pun, titled Delorean. He also released an album from Denzil Porter, Semantics of Mr. Porter and Whispers "Whismonoxide".

== Discography ==
=== Solo albums ===
- Behind the Doors of the 13th Floor (1999)
- The Difference (2003)
- The Most Underrated (2007)
- Same Game New Rules (2014)

=== Compilations ===
- Silencio=Muerte: Red Hot + Latin - AIDS Awareness: "Padre Nuestro" (1996)
- Domingo Presents—Behind the Doors of the 13th Floor compilation (1999)
- Oz (soundtrack) - "OZ Theme 2001 (f/ Kool G Rap, Lord Jamar, and Talib Kweli)" (2001)
- Official Jointz—The Difference Vol.1 compilation (2002)
- Para Mi Gente—Estamos Unidos (2003)
- La Etnia— 5-27 Internacional (2016)

=== Production ===
- Afu Ra - Open 2002
- Angie Martinez - "Suavamente (f/ Wyclef Jean)" 2001
- Bernie Mac - TV Show [Soundtrack]
- Big Daddy Kane - "Flame On" 2001
- Big Punisher - "The Dream Shatterer" 1998
- Blahzay Blahzay "Danger" (Executive Production)
- Boogiemonsters: "Beginning of the End", "Behold the Pale Horse," "Whoever You Are" 1997
- Bone Thugs N Harmony : "1st of the Month (Remix)" 1995
- Canibus: "Pine Comb Poem", "All Clap (Original)
- Channel Live: "Maintain", "Live for Hip-Hop", "360", "Rethink, Replan Refine", "Illegal Broadcasters", "Spark Dat (f/ Benny Boom & Truck Turner)"
- Chords - "Days Chasing Days (f/ Tonedeff)," "Searching For Dreams"
- Chubb Rock - "East vs West (Remix)" 1997
- Cocoa Brovaz - "Play No Games" 2002
- Craig Mack - "The HA HA HA," "On da Run" 2002
- Cuban Link - "Excuse Me Father (deat. One Solo)"
- CunninLynguists - "Southernunderground" 2003
- Das EFX - "If U Luv" 2001
- DJ JS-1 - "Essentials (f/KRS & Rahzel)"
- Fat Cat Kareem - "Money Game" 1998
- Fat Joe - "Success","Part Deux","Say Word", "Dedication" 1995
- First Platoon - "Bodega","Knockin at My Door" 1999
- FT - F-It-Less 2001
- Full Nelson - "Candela (f/ SU)," "Toma Lo Que Tengo,"
- Funkmaster Flex Vol.3 - "KRS Freestyle" 1998
- - Various Artists - Game Over LP.
- Guatauva - Hip-Hop Side of self-titled LP
- The High & Mighty - "Rumble" 2002
- Hurricane G - songs from All Woman
- I-BORN - "Uncle & Nephew","Me & You"
- Immortal Technique - "Internally Bleeding," "Sierra Maestra"
- Infamous Mobb - "Mobb Niggaz (f/ Prodigy)" 2001
- Jack Venom - It's Nothin' 2002
- Kool G. Rap - "Take a Loss," "Sex, Money, Drugs," "My Life (f/ CNN)"
- KRS-One - "The MC" 1997
- Lady Red: "Dona Roja", "Talk Game", "Me & You," "New York, New York"
- Lord Jamar, Kool G Rap & Talib Kweli - OZ Theme 2001
- Main One - "Bring the Drama," "El Gran Combo," "4 My Shorties" 1995
- Masta Ace - "No Regrets", "Dear Diary", "The Type I Hate", "Alphabet Soup" 2001
- Mexicano 777 - Songs from God's Assassins
- Non Phixion - "Caught Between Worlds" 2004
- Okwerdz - "Time for a Change"
- PackFM - "The Fuck," "Ignorance Is Bliss (f/ Apathy & Deacon)", "Nasty", "Take our Place" (f/ Dominion), "Here We Go (Come On)"
- Paula Perry - "Fort Knox". 1998
- Pizon - "Homegirls"
- Rakim - "Watch This," "Bring It On" unreleased
- Random - "Rock and Roll"
- Ras Kass - "Me & My Twins '05 (Feat. Ras & Taj)", "Life/Time (Dead Doves) (Feat. Roscoe, Jay Rock, BLKdiamond, Lil Boo (Zoo Gang), & Taje)", "So Sick (Feat. Stress1)"
- Rahzel - "How Many Times (f/ Keith Murray & Lord Tariq)" ?
- Royal Flush - "Do It"
- Saul Abraham - "Same Old Hood" (feat. St. Laz, Kool G Rap, Hanouneh)
- Shaquille O'Neal - "Best to Worst","Edge of Night" 1996
- Solo For Dolo - "Crown Royal" "Intro" "Go Ask Alice" "Wake Up" "Just Be" "Uprise"
- Supastition - "It's Over Now"
- THOR-EL - "Who R U Frontin 4?", "T.O.P," "Is You Is," "Patiently"
- Tomorrowz Weaponz - "Que Que?," "Para Que Sepan" 2000
- Tonedeff - "Spanish Song," "Heads Up", "Ridiculous", "Loyal (original)", "Hypocrite," "Case Closed," "Give a Damn"
- Tony Touch - "Trouble on the West Side Highway (f/ Slick Rick)" 2004
- Tony Yayo - "Homicide" 2005
- Zach Ready - "Souled Out"
- Zach Ready and Vin City - "The Mustard Seed"
