= Nacho Picasso =

American rapper

- Born: Jesse Robinson; October 30, 1983 (age 43); San Francisco, California, U.S.
- Origin: Seattle, Washington, U.S.
- Genre: Hip hop
- Occupation: Rapper
- Years active: 2010–present
- Labels: Cloud Nice; Alive and Well; Moor Gang; Surf School Recordings
- Website: nachopicasso.bandcamp.com

Jesse Robinson (born October 30, 1983), better known by his stage name Nacho Picasso, is an American rapper born in San Francisco, California and raised in Seattle, Washington. He is a member of the Moor Gang rap collective. He has notably released several collaborative albums with Blue Sky Black Death. The Seattle Times has described him as "our new anti-hero: a party-hardy street-boss misogynist, whose songs are full of dark humor."

== Career ==
In 2011, Nacho Picasso released For the Glory. In January 2012, he released Lord of the Fly, which was followed by Exalted in June that year. For the Glory, Lord of the Fly, and Exalted were produced by Blue Sky Black Death. In November 2012, he released Black Narcissus.

In June 2013, Nacho Picasso released a collaborative album with rapper Avatar Darko, titled Vampsterdam. In October 2013, he released the album High & Mighty, which included production from Jake One, Cardiak, and Vitamin D, among others. It was led by the street single "Crime Waves", produced by Swiff-D.

In January 2014, Nacho Picasso released a 7-track project titled Trances with Wolves, which featured guest appearances by Avatar Darko and Gifted Gab and included production from Jake One and Raised by Wolves, among others. In April 2014, he released a single titled "David Blowie" produced by Raised by Wolves, which samples David Bowie's "Within You", a song from the soundtrack for Labyrinth.

In January 2015, Nacho Picasso's fourth collaborative album with Blue Sky Black Death, titled Stoned & Dethroned, was released on Surf School Recordings. In May that year, he released The Witchtape, a collaborative EP with 88 Ultra.

In 2018, he released an EP, Role Model, which included production from Harry Fraud and a guest appearance from Riff Raff. In 2019, he released Nachferatu. In 2024 and 2025, he released Jesse's Revenge and Séance Musique, both with former Blue Sky Black Death member Televangel.

== Discography ==
=== Studio albums ===
- Blunt Raps (2010)
- Ziploc Hip-Hop (2011) (with BadAssYellowBoyz)
- For the Glory (2011) (with Blue Sky Black Death)
- Lord of the Fly (2012) (with Blue Sky Black Death)
- Exalted (2012) (with Blue Sky Black Death)
- Black Narcissus (2012)
- Vampsterdam (2013) (with Avatar Darko)
- High & Mighty (2013)
- Trances with Wolves: The Prixtape (2014)
- Stoned & Dethroned (2015) (with Blue Sky Black Death)
- Blunt Raps 2 (2015)
- P.T.S.D. (2016) (with Avatar Darko, as Vampsterdam)
- AntiHero Vol. 1 (2016)
- AntiHero Vol. 2 (2017)
- Nachferatu (2019)
- Jesse's Revenge (2024) (with Televangel)
- Séance Musique (2025) (with Televangel)
- Stuntman (2026) (with Televangel)

=== Compilation albums ===
- Radio Edits (2012)

=== EPs ===
- The Witchtape (2015) (with 88 Ultra)
- Role Model (2018)

=== Singles ===
- "Gone till November" (2010)
- "Numbnuts" (2011)
- "Sweaters" (2011)
- "Crime Waves" (2013)
- "Nacho Man" (2013)
- "David Blowie" (2014)
- "Adventure Time" (2014)
- "In the Trump" (2014)
- "DB Shooter" (2014)
- "Big Ass Titties" (2014)

=== Guest appearances ===
- Jarv Dee - "The Code", "Status", and "Moor Returns" from Dopamine (2012)
- Deniro Farrar - "Walkin' Out" from Destiny Altered (2012)
- Sam Lachow - "Cold" from Avenue Music (2012)
- Sax G - "E(iluvme)go" from Pootey Brown Is... (2012)
- Mac Shine - "Keep It Sweet" from Free Lunch (2012)
- Thaddeus David - "Sir Lancelot" from Trapital Trill (2012)
- Chief - "Tat My Name" from Been Chiefin (2012)
- Blue Sky Black Death & Deniro Farrar - "Hold Me Down" from Cliff of Death (2012)
- Blue Sky Black Death - "Feelin' Right" from Skull and Bones (2012)
- Ayelogics - "Monuments" from Odd Man Out (2013)
- Th3rdz - "Pushin" from This That & Th3rdz (2013)
- Mr. MFN Exquire - "Tomorrow's Gone" from Kismet (2013)
- Jarell Perry - "First Time" from Simple Things (2013)
- Steezie Nasa - "Art of War" from Moor Militia (2013)
- Thaddeus David - "Change Your Ways" from None the Less (2013)
- Blue Sky Black Death - "Keys" (2013)
- Key Nyata - "My Way Sidewayz" from The Shadowed Diamond (2013)
- .Cult - "Rose Beds" from #YFB (2014)
- Gifted Gab - "Pay Me" from Girl Rap (2014)
- Sadistik - "Witching Hour" from Ultraviolet (2014)
- Deniro Farrar & Young God - "Keys" from Cliff of Death II (2015)
- Slightly Flagrant (Macntaj and Taane JR) - "Bar of Soap" from Slightly Flagrant (2016)
- Sadistik - "You Dead" from Salo Sessions (2016)
- Midas Wright - "Know Nobody" from The Psychotic Erotic (2016)
- S.A.S. x Blue Sky Black Death - "Nephilim Giants" from Celestial (2016)
