= Delantero =

2021 Cuban drama film

- Theatrical film poster
- English: Forward
- Directed by: Irán Hernández Castillo
- Written by: Irán Hernández Castillo
- Starring: Victor Cruz; Yuliet Cruz; Jorge Martínez
- Release date: 1 January 2021 (Cuba)
- Running time: 63 minutes
- Country: Cuba
- Language: Spanish

Delantero (English: Forward) is a 2021 Cuban LGBTQ+ drama film, directed and written by Irán Hernández Castillo. The film stars Victor Cruz, Jorge Martínez, and Yuliet Cruz. It premiered in Cuba in 2021.

== Synopsis ==
A young Cuban soccer player flees village rumors about his sexuality after a fight, moving to his aunt's in Havana. As he makes new friends and plays soccer, similar gossip resurfaces.

== Cast ==
- Victor Cruz as Freddy
- Yuliet Cruz as Maura
- Jorge Martínez as Rubén
- David Pereira as Damián
- Carolina González as Violeta
- Tony Alonso as Lester
- Pedro Rojas as Quique
- Roberto Romero as Boris
- Omar Alí as Aleco
- Alejandro Palomino as Omar
- Maité Galbán as Luli

== Reception ==
Zachary Wild of The Rectangular View rated it 3.5/5 stars, and praised several aspects: "[It] is a short film about acceptance and the negative effects of living in the closet. The cinematography, pacing, and acting are on point despite a story that at times feels too perfect." Carys Boty of Letterboxd graded it 2.5/5 stars, faintly lauding the film: "A touching story about queerness and acceptance, interwoven with masculinity and toxicity explored in Central America."
