= Oneirology (album) =

Studio album by CunninLynguists
- Released: March 22, 2011
- Genre: Alternative hip-hop
- Length: 50:15
- Labels: A Piece Of Strange; QN5
- Producer: Kno

CunninLynguists chronology
Dirty Acres (2007)	Oneirology (2011)	Rose Azura Njano (2017)

Professional ratings
Review scores
Source	Rating
HipHopDX	3.5/5
PopMatters	9/10
RapReviews	8.5/10
Sputnikmusic	4.5/5
Tom Hull	A-
Urb	4.5/5 stars

Oneirology is the fifth studio album by American hip-hop group CunninLynguists. It was released on March 22, 2011 via A Piece Of Strange/QN5 Music. Production was entirely handled by member Kno, except for two tracks co-produced with Blue Sky Black Death. It features guest appearances from Anna Wise, Bianca Floyd, Big K.R.I.T., BJ the Chicago Kid, Freddie Gibbs, Tonedeff and Tunji. In the United States, the album peaked at number 69 on the Top R&B/Hip-Hop Albums and number 34 on the Heatseekers Albums charts.

== Background ==
All that was known about Oneirology throughout most of 2010 was the name, but details were finally announced in January 2011 by HipHopDX, followed by the album cover and track listing, respectively. In the official website of QN5 Music, the production was announced single-handedly provided by the member Kno.

== Critical reception ==
Andres Tardio of HipHopDX gave the album a 3.5 out of 5, saying, "This project combines creative sounds with inventive rhymes and stands as an example of how a great group can come together to craft a well-made album worthy of praise". He added, "Using their attention to detail on this release, they've managed to build on an already impressive catalog of music and it will not disappoint too many longtime supporters of the crew".

PopMatters listed it as the sixth best hip-hop album of 2011.

== Track listing ==
No.	Title	Writer(s)	Length
1.	"Predormitum (Prologue)"	Ryan Wisler; Garrett Bush; Willis Polk II	4:09
2.	"Darkness (Dream On)" (featuring Anna Wise of Sonnymoon)	Wisler; Bush; Polk II; Anna Wise; Hendrick Floyd	3:56
3.	"Phantasmata"	Wisler	1:54
4.	"Hard as They Come (Act I)" (featuring Freddie Gibbs)	Wisler; Bush; Polk II; Fredrick Tipton	4:17
5.	"Murder (Act II)" (featuring Big K.R.I.T.)	Wisler; Bush; Polk II; Justin Scott; Willie Eames	3:35
6.	"My Habit (I Haven't Changed)"	Wisler; Bush; Polk II	2:01
7.	"Get Ignorant"	Wisler; Bush; Polk II	4:30
8.	"Shattered Dreams"	Wisler; Bush; Polk II	3:39
9.	"Stars Shine Brightest (In the Darkest of Night)"	Wisler; Bush; Polk II; Rick Warren	4:02
10.	"So as Not to Wake You (Interlude)"	Wisler	1:24
11.	"Enemies with Benefits" (featuring Tonedeff)	Wisler; Bush; Polk II; Antonio Rojas; Ryan Maguire; Ian Taggart	3:54
12.	"Looking Back" (featuring Anna Wise of Sonnymoon)	Wisler; Bush; Polk II; Wise	3:14
13.	"Dreams" (featuring Tunji and BJ the Chicago Kid)	Wisler; Bush; Polk II; Olatunji Balogun	5:03
14.	"Hypnopomp (Epilogue)" (featuring Bianca Floyd)	Wisler; Polk II; Bianca Floyd	1:42
15.	"Embers"	Wisler; Bush; Polk II; Maguire; Taggart	2:55
Total length:			50:15

== Personnel ==
- Rick Warren – additional vocals (track 9)
- Willis "Deacon the Villain" Polk II – additional keyboards (tracks: 4, 5, 8, 14)
- Willie Eames – guitar
- DJ Flip Flop – scratches
- Ryan "Kno" Wisler – producer
- Ryan "Kingston" Maguire – co-producer (tracks: 11, 15)
- Ian "Televangel" Taggart – co-producer (tracks: 11, 15)
- Lois van Baarle – artwork
- Kontrast – design, layout

== Charts ==
Chart (2011)	Peak position
US Top R&B/Hip-Hop Albums (Billboard)	69
US Heatseekers Albums (Billboard)	34
