= Will Rap for Food =

Studio album by CunninLynguists
- Released: October 30, 2001
- Genre: Hip-hop
- Label: Urban Acres Entertainment
- Producer: Kno, Celph Titled, Deacon

CunninLynguists chronology
Will Rap for Food (2001)	SouthernUnderground (2003)

Professional ratings
Review scores
Source	Rating
RapReviews	8.5/10
Urban Smarts	Favorable

Will Rap for Food is the debut album by southern hip-hop group CunninLynguists, at the time only consisting of Deacon the Villain and Kno. It was released in October 2001 on Urban Acres Entertainment. The album is mostly produced by Kno, with contributions from Celph Titled and Deacon the Villain, respectively, on the singles "So Live!" and "616 Rewind", which was released via Buds Distribution. Will Rap for Food was re-issued in 2005 by Freschest Records.

== Background ==
The album's title derives from a line from a 2002 Kashal Tee song, "I'm All This", in which he says: "So fuck the commercial tracks you be doin' - A brother got to eat - Yeah? Why don't you rap for food then?" It is played in the intro of "Lynguistics" and Kashal Tee is also featured on the song "616 Rewind". In addition, the quotation could be rooted back to the 2000 album of Guru, Jazzmatazz vol.3 where, in the song "Who's There?", a featuring with Les Nubians, he says: "These distraught thoughts of a young man in a rooming house, This messed up life, this poverty, he could do without, But what options does he have when all hope is gone? A brother gotta eat, plus all the Henny and all the smoke is gone, All it takes is one quick stick".

== Track listing ==
All tracks are produced by Kno, except where noted.

No.	Title	Producer	Length
1.	"Will Rap for Food" (Interlude)		0:26
2.	"Lynguistics"		2:28
3.	"Mic Like a Memory" (feat. Kory Calico)		4:38
4.	"So Live!" (feat. Jayze, Game & Mr. Raw)	Celph Titled	3:08
5.	"Hey" (Interlude)		0:28
6.	"Fukinwichu"		4:51
7.	"Ain't No Way" (feat. Anetra & Mr. SOS)		3:58
8.	"Missing Children" (feat. Braille)		4:56
9.	"Midnight" (Interlude)		0:33
10.	"Thugged Out Since Cub Scouts" (feat. J. Bully & Mr. Raw)		3:52
11.	"Kno's Diggin" (Interlude)		0:37
12.	"Halfanimal"		4:02
13.	"Family Ties" (feat. Anetra & Cashmere the Professional)		4:01
14.	"Dirty South" (Interlude)		0:34
15.	"Mindstate"		3:56
16.	"Takin' the Loss" (feat. J. Bully)		5:29
17.	"Not Guilty"		3:39
18.	"616 Rewind" (feat. Celph Titled, Kashal-Tee, Sankofa, and Tonedeff)	Kno, Deacon the Villain	4:16
