= Supastition =

American rapper

Kamaarphial Moye
- Also known as: Supastition, Kam Moye, Blackmel
- Origin: Greenville, North Carolina, U.S.
- Genres: Hip-hop
- Years active: 2002–present
- Labels: Pockets Linted Entertainment, Freshchest Records, Soulspazm, MYX Music, Reform School Music

Supastition is an American underground hip-hop artist from Greenville, North Carolina. He has also recorded under the name of Kam Moye and Blackmel (in earlier years). He has appeared on songs with the likes of KRS-One, The RZA, Ras Kass, Tech N9ne, Little Brother, Croup, The Soulution, S1 (producer), M-Phazes, Tajai of Souls of Mischief, B-Real of Cypress Hill, Royce da 5'9", Elzhi, and countless others.

== Early career ==
After a brief career recording under the moniker of Blackmel, he officially changed his artist name to Supastition. He is quoted as saying, “The name Supastition came from the fact that people didn't believe in me when I first started pursuing music. I had to prove myself to people and still didn't get love from in my state and around my city at first. It was a name I chose, because some people believe in superstition and some don't." Supastition later signed a single deal with Bay Area rapper Rasco of Cali Agents and his Pockets Linted Entertainment record label. This union spawned the 12" vinyl for Broke Man's Anthem and Battle Cry, both produced by Supastition himself.

== 7 Years of Bad Luck ==
Shortly after the single was released in 2002, Supastition signed a non-exclusive deal with the now defunct, New York-based hip-hop and drum-n-bass label, Freshchest Records, to distribute his debut album, 7 Years of Bad Luck. A single and music video was released for his ‘starving artist’ fueled song, "da Waiting Period". Although the album was praised for its honest lyricism, the record was plagued by what critics considered subpar production. In an interview with Platform8470.com, he expressed his displeasure with the album because he was not allowed to choose his own beats. The owners of Freshchest Records were also producers who substituted the original production with their own production. This caused a less than amicable split between the two parties and Supastition ceased with promoting the album.

== The Deadline and Chain Letters ==
In 2004, Supastition received his first taste of national recognition via the Okayplayer Records, spearheaded by ?uestlove of The Roots, when his collaboration, "The Williams", with Foreign Exchange producer Nicolay was selected out of 5,000 entries to appear on the True Notes Vol. 1 compilation. Later that year, Philadelphia-based Soulspazm Records signed Supastition to release his most critically acclaimed releases, The Deadline and Chain Letters which respectively featured production from Nicolay, Jake One, !llmind, and M-Phazes in addition to guest features and stage appearances with fellow artists, Little Brother, Cage (rapper), Breez Evahflowin', J-Zone, and his own DJs Faust & Shortee.

These releases garnered high praise in print magazines including XXL's Chairman's Choice, The Source's Independent's Day, XLR8R, the now defunct Scratch Magazine and URB, and numerous other publications. The independent success from the two Soulspazm projects allowed him to tour in over 12 countries within a two-year span. Promotion of the album ceased when Studio Distribution suddenly folded, leaving many artists and labels in limbo at the time. When well-respected hip-hop label, Rawkus Records, began to absorb and distribute Soulspazm artists and back catalog, Supastition choose to leave the label due to his lack of interested in working with Rawkus Records. He quoted, “I guess the breaking point for us was when they merged with Rawkus. I saw from the jump that the Rawkus situation wasn't a good move for me.”

== Self-Centered and Splitting Image ==
After dealing with a car accident, Supastition felt inspired to record more positive music under the shortened version of his given name, Kam Moye. On June 17, 2008, he released Self-Centered EP under the new name. Followed by the music video, Black Enough?, the video sparked attention via the internet including the popular urban website, WorldStarHipHop, with his controversial opinion on racial prejudice within the African-American community. In 2009, Kam began being managed by the Hall of Justus Music Group, known for Little Brother and 9th Wonder, and signed exclusively with MYX Music label, a subsidiary of the Filipino-based MYX TV channel and the ABS-CBN cable network.

The first album under Kam Moye, Splitting Image, was released on October 27, 2009 to mixed reviews from fans expecting the harder edged sound from previous releases. The lead single, "Let's Be Honest", appeared on The Freshman video segment on MTVu and received rotation for a few weeks on the station. In May 2010, funding for the MYX Music Label US operations ended and ABS-CBN Corporation ceased production of the U.S. television channel and record label.

== Exit and subsequent return to music ==
Due to frustration with a failing music business, Kam Moye surprisingly announced that he was leaving the music industry altogether on April 25, 2010. However, in late 2012 he announced he was returning to recording and releasing music under the name Supastition, and released The Blackboard EP in early 2013.

On February 18, 2014, Supastition released an EP, Honest Living, which is produced entirely by Croup.

== Collaborations ==
Though Supastition has three albums and three EP releases to date, his frequent collaborations outweighed his output for his own music. His most notable appearances include ‘Wake Up Show Anthem’ 2010 featuring The RZA, Ras Kass, Tech N9ne, Tajai of Souls of Mischief, and DJ Revolution, ‘Best To Do It’ featuring Elzhi and Royce da 5’9”, Little Brother ‘Rolling Out’, KRS-One’s ‘Still Spittin’, Stoupe of Jedi Mind Tricks ‘The Truth’, and Marco Polo ‘Heat’. During an interview with TheUndergroundComeup.com, Supastition claimed to have recorded over 40 collaborations with artists from all over the world. He was also once a member of the music crew, Wax Reform, which once boasted members such as Australian producer M-Phazes, Illmind, and Emilio Rojas. He credits his influences as golden era rappers such as Rakim, Big Daddy Kane, Slick Rick, Lord Finesse, Chuck D as well as Andre 3000.

== Discography ==
=== Studio albums ===
Album information
7 Years of Bad Luck
- Released: October 15, 2002
- Label: Freshchest Records
- Singles: "Da Waiting Period"
Chain Letters
- Released: October 25, 2005
- Label: Soulspazm Records
- Singles: "Hate My Face"/"Soul Control"
Splitting Image
- Released: October 27, 2009
- Label: MYX Music
- Singles: "Splitting Image"/"Life Line"/"Forever Fresh"
The Gold Standard
- Released: June 2, 2015
- Label: Reform School Music
- Singles: "Flawless"

=== EPs ===
Album information
The Deadline
- Released: October 19, 2004
- Label: Soulspazm Records
- Singles: "Boombox"/ "Fountain of Youth"/ "Homecomin'"
Leave of Absence
- Released: 2007 (digital), August 19, 2008 (physical)
- Label: Reform School Music / Domination Recordings
- Singles: "Word Has It"
Self-Centered (as Kam Moye)
- Released: June 17, 2008
- Label: RappersIKnow.com (free download)
- Singles: "Black Enough"
The Blackboard
- Released: January 15, 2013
- Label: Reform School Music (free download)
- Singles: "Yada Yada"
Honest Living
- Released: February 18, 2014
- Label: Reform School Music (name your price)
- Singles: "Eardrum" / "Nothing Like It"

== Appears on ==
- "Shine Through" (from the Soulution album Shine Through, 2009)
- "Soul Shine" ft Bahamadia, Mr J Medeiros and Kam Moye (from the Soulution album Shine Through, 2009)
- "Nasty Filthy" (from the Cunninlynguists album SouthernUnderground, 2003)
- "The Signature (Rock On)" (from the Meet John Doe compilation, 2003)
- "Me Minus You" (from the Philaflava presents...A League of Their Own compilation, 2003)
- "It's Over Now" (from the Asterick:Two compilation, 2003)
- "Right Here" (from the Spitkicker presents...The Next Spit, Vol. 1 compilation, 2003)
- "Round and Round" (from the Arecee album Beating a Dead Horse, 2004)
- "Spitkicker Freestyle" (from the Spitkicker presents...The Next Spit, Vol. 3 compilation, 2004)
- "The Williams" (from the Okayplayer True Notes Vol. 1 compilation, 2004)
- "3 Treacherous" (from the DJ John Doe mixtape The Domination Mix Volume One, 2004)
- "Quotables" (from the Tonedeff album Archetype, 2004)
- "Let Go" (from the Braille album Shades of Grey, 2004)
- "Flippin' Rhymes" (from The Others album Past Futuristic, 2004)
- "Moodswings" (from the Phocus album A Vision & a Plan, 2004)
- "Still Spittin'" (from the KRS-One album Keep Right, 2004)
- "Doin' Me" (from the Little Brother mixtape The Chittlin Circuit 1.5, 2005)
- "Last Run" (from the Splash album The Ripple Effect, 2005)
- "The Grind" (from the Cesar Comanche album Squirrel & the Aces, 2005)
- "Action" (from The White Shadow of Norway album Renegades, 2005)
- "Trifactor" (from the Pumpkinhead album Orange Moon Over Brooklyn, 2005)
- "Carry On" (from the Kenn Starr album Starr Status, 2006)
- "Think Fast" (from the Silent Knight album Hunger Strike, 2007)
- "Heat" (from the Marco Polo album Port Authority, 2007)
- "Do It to Death" (from the Little Brother mixtape And Justus for All, 2007)
- "Still Waters Run Deep" (from the Snowgoons Album Black Snow, 2008)
- "Changes of Atmosphere" (from the Dela (Cergy, France) album Changes of Atmosphere, 2008)
- "Change" (from the Promise album More Than Music, 2008)
- "Fresh Out the Box" (from the Keri Album The Beat Bandit, 2009)
- "Southwest" (from the Rasco Album Global Threat, 2009)
- "R.A.W." (from the Nuff Said (Bruges, Belgium) album VisViva, 2010)
- "Friends Like These" (from the Boog Brown and Apollo Brown album Brown Study, 2010) as Kam Moye
- "Love Is Lost" (from Wise Dome's album Vision Proper, 2011)
