= A Piece of Strange =

Studio album by CunninLynguists
- Released: January 24, 2006
- Studio: A Piece of Strange Studios (Lexington, Kentucky); Azimuth Studios (Santa Fe, New Mexico)
- Genre: Hip-hop; Southern hip-hop; underground hip-hop
- Length: 54:09
- Label: QN5 Music; L.A. Underground
- Producer: Kno

CunninLynguists chronology
Sloppy Seconds Vol. 2 (2005)	A Piece of Strange (2006)	Dirty Acres (2007)

A Piece of Strange is the third studio album by the Southern hip-hop trio CunninLynguists, consisting of Kno, Deacon the Villain and Natti. It was released January 24, 2006, by The LA Underground, a record label based in New Mexico.

== Background ==
The “high-concept record” tells the "tale of the pathway to and from sin". The album was produced entirely by Kno, and vocals are by Kno, Deacon the Villain and Natti, who joined the group prior to the recording of the album. Featured guest vocalists include Cee-Lo Green, Immortal Technique, and Tonedeff. Deacon and Kno have both cited the album's importance to their careers in interviews, with Kno calling it a "turning point" for the group. CunninLynguists toured domestically and overseas in support of the album, appearing with acts such as Depeche Mode, Kanye West, Bun B, and Pharrell Williams.

== Artwork ==
The album's cover art is by Becky Cloonan. Cloonan's collaboration with CunninLynguists occurred following her listing their song "Love Ain't" as something she was listening to in an issue of her comic Demo.

== Reception and legacy ==
Professional ratings
Review scores
Source	Rating
Hype	5/5 stars
IGN	(9/10)
HipHopDX	4/5 stars
RapReviews	(8.5/10)
Okayplayer	4/5 stars
Scratch	(8/10)
URB	4/5 stars

A Piece of Strange received widespread acclaim from critics, with XXL calling it "soulful", "raw", and "sophisticated", URB calling it "a piece of beauty", Scratch calling it "top-shelf", CMJ calling it a "beautiful...dense opera", and The A.V. Club calling it "vast and ambitious". Since its release in 2006, the album has been mentioned as one of the most important underground hip-hop albums and praised for portraying a narrative not visited in any previous hip-hop album.

== Track listing ==
No.	Title	Length
1.	"Where Will You Be?"	1:03
2.	"Since When"	4:02
3.	"Nothing to Give"	3:30
4.	"Caved In" (featuring Cee Lo Green)	3:17
5.	"Hourglass"	3:21
6.	"Beautiful Girl"	3:24
7.	"Inhale (Interlude)"	2:02
8.	"Brain Cell"	4:23
9.	"America Loves Gangsters" (featuring Tim Means)	4:28
10.	"Never Know Why" (featuring Immortal Technique)	3:51
11.	"The Gates" (featuring Tonedeff)	4:05
12.	"Damnation (Interlude)"	1:38
13.	"Hellfire"	2:29
14.	"Remember Me (Abstract/Reality)"	4:26
15.	"What'll You Do?"	2:43
16.	"The Light" (featuring Club Dub)	5:30
Total length:		54:09

Notes

- "Since When" features additional vocals by Anetra and SunnyStylez
- "Brain Cell" features additional vocals by Anetra
- "The Light" features additional vocals by Ladonna Young and Anetra

== Personnel ==
Credits for A Piece of Strange adapted from AllMusic.

- Willie Eames – lead guitar, bass guitar (tracks 1–3, 5–15)
- Tony Rojas – graphic design
- Chris Webster – engineering
- Becky Cloonan – cover illustrations
- Jesse Howerton – additional keyboards
- Greg Forsburg – mastering
- Kno – production, executive production, mixing, photography
- DJ Sicari – scratches (tracks 1–3, 5–16)
- G. Bush – writing (tracks 2–4, 6, 8–9, 13–16)
- R. Wisler – writing (tracks 1–16)
- W. Eames – writing (tracks 2–4, 10, 15–16)
- W. Polk – writing (tracks 1–6, 8–13, 15–16)
