= Flowers for My Father =

Studio album by Sadistik
- Released: February 19, 2013
- Genre: Alternative hip-hop
- Length: 62:23
- Label: Fake Four Inc.
- Producers: Kid Called Computer; Blue Sky Black Death; Raised by Wolves; Kno; Eric G; Andreikelos

Sadistik chronology
The Balancing Act (2008)	Flowers for My Father (2013)	Ultraviolet (2014)

Singles from Flowers for My Father
- 1. "Kill the King" Released: 2013

Professional ratings
Review scores
Source	Rating
Potholes in My Blog	3.5/5 stars
RapReviews.com	7.5/10
Sputnikmusic	4.3 (superb)

Flowers for My Father is a solo studio album by American rapper Sadistik, released via Fake Four Inc. on February 19, 2013. "Kill the King" was released as a single from the album.

On June 20, 2013, Respect included the album on the "13 Best Below-the-Radar Projects of the Year (So Far)" list.

== Production ==
The album includes "Micheal", a tribute song to Sadistik's deceased friend Micheal "Eyedea" Larsen. The song samples Peter Gabriel's "In Your Eyes". Larsen's family and friends appeared on the music video for the song. Music videos were also created for "City in Amber", "Russian Roulette", and "Kill the King".

== Track listing ==
No.	Title	Producer(s)	Length
1.	"Petrichor"	Kid Called Computer	5:15
2.	"Russian Roulette" (featuring Cage and Yes Alexander)	Blue Sky Black Death	4:21
3.	"City in Amber" (featuring Lotte Kestner)	Blue Sky Black Death	3:44
4.	"Snow White"	Raised by Wolves	4:46
5.	"The Beast"	Blue Sky Black Death	5:47
6.	"Kill the King" (featuring Deacon the Villain)	Kno	3:40
7.	"Song for the End of the World"	Raised by Wolves; Eric G	5:04
8.	"Palmreader" (featuring Child Actor)	Eric G	4:15
9.	"Micheal"	Eric G	5:23
10.	"Seven Devils"	Andreikelos	6:15
11.	"Exit Theme" (featuring Astronautalis and Lotte Kestner)	Eric G	5:16
12.	"Melancholia"	Eric G	3:31
13.	"A Long Winter" (featuring Ceschi)	Blue Sky Black Death	5:06
Total length:			62:23
