= All Woman (album) =

Studio album by Hurricane G
- Released: September 16, 1997
- Recorded: 1996–1997
- Genre: Hip hop
- Length: 48:45
- Label: H.O.L.A.
- Producers: Domingo, Luis Miranda, Al "Butter" McLean

Professional ratings
Review scores
Source	Rating
AllMusic	3/5 stars
The Source	2.5/5 stars

All Woman is the only studio album by Hurricane G, released on September 16, 1997, through Jellybean Benitez's H.O.L.A. Recordings.

The album was poorly promoted and failed to reach the Billboard album charts, however the album's lead single "Somebody Else" (which used a sampled of The Jones Girls 1979 hit "You Gonna Make Me Love Somebody Else") became a top 10 hit on the Hot Rap Singles chart.

The album features a sole guest appearance by American hip hop duo Das EFX

== Track listing ==
No.	Title	Length
1.	"Intro"	1:35
2.	"All the Way Live"	2:47
3.	"Underground Lockdown"	3:53
4.	"Roc U"	3:58
5.	"Somebody Else"	3:46
6.	"El Barrio"	4:16
7.	"Mama"	4:04
8.	"Wuteva"	3:27
9.	"Boriqua Mami"	3:24
10.	"Coast to Coast" (featuring Das EFX)	3:28
11.	"G, Toya & Nini"	0:36
12.	"No Love"	3:55
13.	"Neva Give Up"	4:25
14.	"De Corazon"	3:51
15.	"Outro"	1:20

== Charts ==
=== Somebody Else ===
Chart (1997)	Peak position
Billboard Hot R&B/Hip-Hop Singles & Tracks	54
Billboard Hot Rap Singles	10
