= The Deadline (EP) =

EP by Supastition
- Released: October 19, 2004
- Studio: The Wreck Center (Charlotte, NC)
- Genre: Hip-hop
- Length: 36:25
- Label: Soulspazm
- Producer: Croup; Dela; Illmind; Madwreck; moO; M-Phazes

Supastition chronology
7 Years of Bad Luck (2002)	The Deadline (2004)	Chain Letters (2005)

Singles from The Deadline
- 1. "Boom Box" Released: 2004

Professional ratings
Review scores
Source	Rating
AllHipHop	3/5 stars
RapReviews	7.5/10

The Deadline is an extended play by American rapper Supastition. It was released on October 19, 2004 via Soulspazm Records. Recording sessions took place at the Wreck Center in Charlotte. Production was handled by M-Phazes, Illmind, Croup, Dela, Madwreck and moO. It features guest appearances from Madwreck and Sycorax One.

== Track listing ==
No.	Title	Writer(s)	Producer(s)	Length
1.	"Deadline Intro"	Kam Moye; Ramon Ibanga Jr.	Illmind	1:49
2.	"Boombox"	Moye; Ibanga Jr.	Illmind	4:02
3.	"Fountain of Youth"	Moye; Murat-Deniz Akgül	moO	3:29
4.	"I Remember"	Moye; Mark Landon	M-Phazes	4:19
5.	"Homecoming"	Moye; Landon	M-Phazes	3:43
6.	"Soul Searching"	Moye; Antoine Chardayre	Dela	3:34
7.	"If I Knew"	Moye; Landon	M-Phazes	4:08
8.	"Nowhere to Run" (featuring Sycorax 1 and Madwreck)	Moye; Johnny McKiever; Emilio Rojas	Madwreck	4:00
9.	"Step It Up"	Moye; Landon	M-Phazes	3:51
10.	"Adrenaline"	Moye; Daniel Esser	Croup	3:30
Total length:				36:25

Notes

- Tracks 9 and 10 are marked as bonus tracks.
