= Still Motion (album) =

Studio album by Natti
- Released: September 24, 2013
- Genre: Hip-hop
- Length: 42:31
- Label: APOS Music
- Producer: Deacon the Villain, Kno, SunnyStylez

Professional ratings
Review scores
Source	Rating
RapReviews	8/10

Still Motion is the first studio album by American hip-hop artist Natti, a member of the hip-hop group CunninLynguists. It was released September 24, 2013 on APOS Music.

== Music ==
The album is mostly produced by Deacon the Villain and Kno, respectively, with one track produced by SunnyStylez. Guest appearances include Deacon the Villain, Freddie Gibbs, Sha Stimuli and Substantial, among others.

== Track listing ==
No.	Title	Producer	Length
1.	"Still Motion" (featuring Deacon the Villain)	Deacon the Villain	1:31
2.	"Another Galaxy"	Kno	3:59
3.	"All I Need" (featuring Deacon the Villain)	Deacon the Villain	3:45
4.	"Bright Lights Big City"	Deacon the Villain	2:45
5.	"Late Night Cruise" (featuring Deacon the Villain & Young Chu)	Deacon the Villain	3:01
6.	"You Black Bastard (Skit)"		0:41
7.	"Just Like You" (featuring Freddie Gibbs & Studio)	Kno	3:00
8.	"Pusher Man" (featuring Mino Slick)	Deacon the Villain	2:44
9.	"Filthy Hard" (featuring Deacon the Villain)	Kno	2:41
10.	"G.O.R. (Gods of Rap)" (featuring Deacon the Villain, Sheisty Krist & Vegas Posada)	Deacon the Villain	4:32
11.	"Architecture" (featuring Sha Stimuli & Substantial)	Deacon the Villain	3:39
12.	"Black Diamonds" (featuring Jason Coffey)	Deacon the Villain	2:52
13.	"Miss America (Skit)"		0:37
14.	"Allegiance" (featuring Deacon the Villain & Cecil Gardner)	SunnyStylez	3:19
15.	"Underground Railroad" (featuring Mino Slick)	Deacon the Villain	3:25
