= Splitting Image (Kam Moye album) =

Studio album by Kam Moye
- Released: October 27, 2009
- Genre: Hip-hop
- Length: 57:05
- Label: MYX Music
- Producer: D.R.; Illmind; Jake One; Khrysis; Marco Polo; M-Phazes; SIC Beats; Symbolyc One; Veterano; Vitamin D

Kam Moye chronology
Chain Letters (2005)	Splitting Image (2009)	Gold Standard (2015)

Splitting Image is the third full-length studio album by American rapper Supastition. It was released on October 27, 2009, via MYX Music Label. Production was handled by D.R., Jake One, Veterano, Vitamin D, Illmind, Khrysis, Marco Polo, M-Phazes, SIC Beats and Symbolyc One. It features guest appearances from Ayah Marar, Baba Zumbi, Buff1, Lil' Sci, Neenah, One Be Lo, Phonte, Tenille, and Tiffany Paige.

== Critical reception ==
Professional ratings
Aggregate scores
Source	Rating
Metacritic	74/100
Review scores
Source	Rating
HipHopDX	3.5/5
PopMatters	6/10
Prefix	5.5/10
RapReviews	8.5/10
The A.V. Club	B+

Splitting Image was met with generally favorable reviews from music critics. At Metacritic, which assigns a normalized rating out of 100 to reviews from mainstream publications, the album received an average score of 74 based on four reviews.

Eric Sirota of RapReviews stated: "it's not a new sound, and, at points, the tracks feel monotonous as they bleed into each other. Still, there are certainly standouts". Nathan Rabin of The A.V. Club claimed: "Moye is never anything less than truthful; he's so unrelentingly forthright and candid that song titles like "Let's Get Honest" and "Reality Check" can't help but seem a little redundant".

In mixed reviews, David Amidon of PopMatters wrote: "he's not the most impressive MC, but like Fashawn or Blu, he's articulate when it comes to laying out a life story across a record. Fans ought to be pleased, as well as fans of that QN5/Justus League southern hip-hop". Andrew Martin of Prefix magazine concluded: "at 15 tracks clocking in at 57 minutes, it shouldn't feel as lengthy as it does. But certain cuts tend to drag, be it because of the inconsistent production, Moye's sometimes phoned-in rapping, or both".

== Track listing ==
No.	Title	Writer(s)	Producer(s)	Length
1.	"Re: Born"	Kamaarphial Moye; Derrick Jabbar Brown	Vitamin D	3:17
2.	"Reality Check"	Moye; Christopher Tyson	Khrysis	3:58
3.	"Stars" (featuring Lil' Sci)	Moye; John Robinson; Diarra Mayfield	D.R.	3:26
4.	"Splitting Image" (featuring Neenah)	Moye; Floor M. Smelt; Larry Griffin, Jr.; Caleb McCampbell	S1; Caleb McCampbell (co.)	3:56
5.	"Imani"	Moye; S. Auguste	SIC Beats	2:37
6.	"Hello Karma" (featuring Phonte and Ayah)	Moye; Phonte Coleman; Merna Bishouty; Brown	Vitamin D	4:40
7.	"No Substitute"	Moye; Jacob Dutton	Jake One	3:17
8.	"Let's Be Honest"	Moye; Eric Jorge Osborne	Veterano	3:51
9.	"Don't Forget" (featuring Tiffany Paige)	Moye; Tiffany P. Walker; Mark Landon	M-Phazes	4:16
10.	"Do What It Takes" (featuring Buff1)	Moye; Jamall Bufford; Mayfield	D.R.	3:24
11.	"Nobody's Fool" (featuring Tenille)	Moye; Mayfield	D.R.	4:24
12.	"Give out, Give In"	Moye; Osborne	Veterano	5:12
13.	"Life Line" (featuring One Be Lo)	Moye; Roland Scruggs; Dutton	Jake One	3:47
14.	"MK-Ultra" (featuring Baba Zumbi)	Moye; Ramon Ibanga, Jr.	Illmind	3:30
15.	"Forever Fresh"	Moye; Marco Bruno	Marco Polo	3:30
Total length:				57:05

== Personnel ==
- Kamaarphial "Supastition" Moye – vocals, executive producer
- John "Lil' Sci" Robinson – vocals (track 3)
- Floor "Neenah" Smelt – additional vocals (track: 3, 4), mixing (tracks: 1, 3, 4, 6–9, 12)
- Phonte Coleman – vocals (track 6)
- Merna "Ayah Marar" Bishouty – vocals (track 6)
- Tiffany Paige – additional vocals (track 9)
- Jamall "Buff1" Bufford – vocals (track 10)
- Tenille – additional vocals (track 11)
- Roland "One Be Lo" Scruggs – vocals (track 13)
- Stephen "Baba Zumbi" Gaines – vocals (track 14)
- Larry "Symbolyc One" Griffin Jr. – drums & producer (track 4)
- Caleb McCampbell – bass & co-producer (track 4)
- DJ Flash – scratches (track 13)
- Derrick "Vitamin D" Brown – producer (tracks: 1, 6)
- Christopher "Khrysis" Tyson – producer & mixing (track 2)
- Diarra "D.R." Mayfield – producer (tracks: 3, 10, 11)
- S. "SIC Beats" Auguste – producer (track 5)
- Jacob "Jake One" Dutton – producer (tracks: 7, 13)
- Eric Jorge "Veterano" Osborne – producer (tracks: 8, 12)
- Mark "M-Phazes" Landon – producer (track 9)
- Ramon "Illmind" Ibanga Jr. – producer (track 14)
- Marco "Marco Polo" Bruno – producer (track 15), mixing (tracks: 7, 15)
- Johnny "Madwreck" McKiever – mixing (tracks: 5, 11, 13)
- Charles Herron – mixing (tracks: 10, 14)
- Luis "L-Rox" Franco – mastering
- Karim Panni – executive producer
- Tobias Rose – artwork concept, photography
- Ken Louie-Nishikawa – artwork concept, layout
- Ricky Himpraphanh – logo design
- Sime – logo design
- Mischa "Big Dho" Burgess – management
