= 7 Years of Bad Luck =

Studio album by Supastition
- Released: October 15, 2002
- Genre: Hip-hop
- Label: Freshchest
- Producer: Freshchest Prose; Hood; Soul; Equinox; Sarcastic; Eagleman; Double S

Supastition chronology
7 Years of Bad Luck (2002)	The Deadline (2004)

Professional ratings
Review scores
Source	Rating
AllMusic	3/5 stars
RapReviews	7.5/10 stars

7 Years of Bad Luck is the debut album from North Carolina hip-hop artist Supastition. The title references his struggles in the music industry. The release was praised for strong lyricism, but criticized for weak production.

== Track listing ==
#	Title	Producer(s)	Performer (s)
1	"Intro"	Freshchest Prose	Supastition
2	"Live Like Dat"	Hood	Supastition
3	"Celebration Of Life"	Freshchest Prose	Supastition
4	"Da Waiting Period"	Hood	Supastition
*	"Soul Interlude #1"	Soul	*Instrumental*
5	"Body Language"	Freshchest Prose	Supastition
6	"Best Of Life"	Equinox	Supastition
7	"That'z Muzik"	Freshchest Prose	Supastition
*	"Soul Interlude #2"	Soul	*Instrumental*
8	"Crown Me!!!"	Equinox	Supastition
9	"Mixed Emotionz"	Sarcastic	Supastition
10	"The Trademark"	Sarcastic	Supastition
*	"Soul Interlude #3"	Soul	*Instrumental*
11	"Fallen Star"	Sarcastic	Supastition
12	"Hip Hop vs. Life"	Eagleman	Supastition
13	"2nd Name"	Sarcastic	Supastition, Equinox, Seven
14	"Dreamland"	Double S	Supastition
*	"Mixed Emotionz [Remix]"	Freshchest Prose	Supastition
