= Altars (album) =

Studio album by Sadistik
- Released: April 14, 2017
- Genre: Alternative hip-hop
- Length: 46:01
- Label: Equal Vision Records
- Producers: Madeaux; Ryu Alexy; Jimmy Kelso; Fameless; Andy McMann; S.A.T.; Eric G; Myst; Azalah; Furnace of Stars

Sadistik chronology
Ultraviolet (2014)	Altars (2017)	Haunted Gardens (2019)

Professional ratings
Review scores
Source	Rating
RapReviews.com	8/10

Altars is a solo studio album by American rapper Sadistik, released via Equal Vision Records on April 14, 2017. It peaked at number 13 on the Billboard Heatseekers Albums chart, as well as number 35 on the Independent Albums chart.

The cover art was painted by Michael Hussar. Music videos were created for "Free Spirits", "God Complex", "Kaleidoscope", and "Honeycomb".

Sy Shackleford of RapReviews.com named it the 6th best album of 2017.

== Track listing ==
No.	Title	Producer(s)	Length
1.	"Voodoo Dali"	Madeaux	2:41
2.	"God Complex"	Ryu Alexy; Jimmy Kelso	3:10
3.	"Free Spirits"	Ryu Alexy; Jimmy Kelso	4:13
4.	"Roaches"	Fameless	3:57
5.	"Honeycomb"	Fameless	4:12
6.	"Cotard's Syndrome"	Ryu Alexy; Fameless	5:15
7.	"Salem Witches"	Andy McMann	3:03
8.	"Sacrifice"	Ryu Alexy; Jimmy Kelso	3:39
9.	"Water" (featuring Kristoff Krane)	S.A.T.	4:34
10.	"Molecules" (featuring P.O.S and Terra Lopez)	Eric G	4:01
11.	"Kaleidoscope"	Myst; Azalah	2:37
12.	"Silhouettes" (featuring Lige Newton)	Furnace of Stars	4:39
Total length:			46:01

== Charts ==
Chart	Peak position
US Heatseekers Albums (Billboard)	13
US Independent Albums (Billboard)	35
