= Ultraviolet (Sadistik album) =

Studio album by Sadistik
- Released: July 1, 2014
- Genre: Alternative hip-hop
- Length: 55:23
- Label: Fake Four Inc.
- Producers: Sxmplelife; Eric G; Maulskull; Kid Called Computer

Sadistik chronology
Flowers for My Father (2013)	Ultraviolet (2014)	Altars (2017)

Professional ratings
Review scores
Source	Rating
Exclaim!	7/10
RapReviews.com	7.5/10

Ultraviolet is a solo studio album by American rapper Sadistik, released via Fake Four Inc. on July 1, 2014. It peaked at number 37 on the Billboard Heatseekers Albums chart.

== Production ==
The late Eyedea is featured on "Chemical Burns". The album also features guest appearances from Nacho Picasso, Sticky Fingaz, and Tech N9ne. Production is handled by Sxmplelife, Eric G, Maulskull, and Kid Called Computer. The title of the album derives from a book about color spectrums.

Music videos were created for "Cult Leader", "1984", and "Orange".

== Track listing ==
No.	Title	Producer(s)	Length
1.	"Cult Leader"	Sxmplelife	2:03
2.	"1984"	Sxmplelife	3:57
3.	"Chemical Burns" (featuring Eyedea and Lotte Kestner)	Sxmplelife	3:57
4.	"Into the Night"	Eric G	3:59
5.	"Cubic Zirconia"	Eric G	5:10
6.	"Orange" (featuring Child Actor)	Maulskull	5:00
7.	"Nowhere"	Eric G	3:53
8.	"Witching Hour" (featuring Nacho Picasso)	Eric G	5:02
9.	"Still Awake"	Sxmplelife	3:37
10.	"Blue Sunshine"	Sxmplelife	3:13
11.	"Death Warrant" (featuring Sticky Fingaz and Tech N9ne)	Eric G	4:10
12.	"Gummo" (featuring Yes Alexander)	Eric G	4:17
13.	"The Rabbithole" (featuring Terra Lopez)	Kid Called Computer	7:05
Total length:			55:23

== Charts ==
Chart	Peak position
US Heatseekers Albums (Billboard)	37
