= Chain Letters (album) =

Studio album by Supastition
- Released: October 25, 2005
- Genre: Hip-hop
- Label: Soulspazm
- Producer: Illmind; M-Phazes; Nicolay; Jake One; Madwreck

Supastition chronology
The Deadline (2004)	Chain Letters (2005)	Splitting Image (2009)

Professional ratings
Review scores
Source	Rating
AllHipHop.com	3.5/5 stars
JIVE Magazine	5/5 stars
Okayplayer	(89)
Stylus Magazine	B+

Chain Letters is the second album from North Carolina hip-hop artist Supastition. "Hate My Face" was released as a single but did not chart.

== Track listing ==
1. "Chain Letters (Intro)" – 3:30 (Ibanga, Moye)
2. "Don't Stop" – 4:17 (Landon, Moye)
3. "Split Decisions" – 4:25 (Landon, Moye)
4. "Soul Control" – 3:26 (Coleman, Ibanga, Jones, Moye)
  - (featuring Phonte, Big Pooh)
5. "Rise" – 3:56 (Moye, Rook)
6. "That Ain't Me" – 5:05 (Ibanga, Moye)
7. "Hate My Face" – 4:01 (Dutton, Moye)
8. "Special Treatment" – 3:46 (Ibanga, Moye)
9. "Ain't Goin' Out (Like That)" – 2:30 (Ibanga, Moye)
10. "A Baby Story" – 4:24 (Moye, Rigmaiden, Rook)
  - (featuring Noñameko)
11. "100%" – 4:07 (Ibanga, Moye)
12. "Yesterday Everyday" – 5:26 (D, Moye, Rook, Young)
  - (featuring D Minor)
13. "Nickeled Needles" – 4:40 (Landon, Moye)
14. "Appreciation" – 4:13 (McKiever, Moye)
15. "Blood Brothers" – 4:40 (Clinton, Ibanga, Moye)
  - (featuring Seven)
16. "Always" – 3:54 (Eusebio, Landon, Moye)
  - (featuring Can'Tell)
17. "Soul Control" (solo version), "Boondocks Studio" (skit), "Yall-Mart" (skit) – 5:55 (Ibanga, Moye)

== Production ==
- Illmind (track 1, 4, 6, 8, 9, 11, 15, 17)
- M-Phazes (track 2, 3, 13, 16)
- Nicolay (track 5, 10, 12)
- Jake One (track 7)
- Madwreck (track 14)
