= The Soulution =

Studio album by Epidemic x Tantu
- Released: August 5, 2014
- Genre: Hip Hop
- Label: Mic Theory Records
- Producer: Tantu

The Soulution is an EP collaboration between hip hop group Epidemic and hip hop producer Tantu,

it was originally started as a guest feature for Tantu's release "Language of beats" but became a project in it own right. The entire EP is produced by Tantu and equates to 25 minutes of overall play. Fashawn and Johaz of Dag Savage are both featured once on separate tracks.

== Track listing ==
No.	Title	Producer(s)	Length
1.	"The Soulution"	Tantu	03:12
2.	"Dreamers" (featuring Fashawn)	Tantu	03:56
3.	"Cold World"	Tantu	04:39
4.	"Get Up (Interlude)"	Tantu	01:45
5.	"Playin' With My Heart" (featuring Johaz of Dag Savage)	Tantu	05:04
6.	"History Lesson" (Includes hidden track)	Tantu	07:53
