= Hurricane G =

American rapper (1970–2022)

- Born: Gloria Rodríguez; May 20, 1970; Brooklyn, New York City, U.S.
- Died: November 6, 2022 (aged 52)
- Genres: Hip hop
- Occupation: Rapper
- Years active: 1992–2022
- Label: H.O.L.A.
- Formerly of: Def Squad; Hit Squad

Gloria Rodríguez (20 May 1970 – November 6, 2022), better known by her stage name Hurricane G, was an American rapper of Puerto Rican descent. She is best known for her 1997 single "Somebody Else", which peaked at number 10 on Billboard's Hot Rap Songs chart and number 54 on the magazine's Hot R&B/Hip-Hop Songs chart.

== Biography ==
Rodríguez was born in Brooklyn, New York City, in 1970. She was the Hit Squad's first female member, and she made guest appearances on albums by Keith Murray, Redman, Xzibit, Delinquent Habits, Funkdoobiest, the Cocoa Brovaz, and others. She also appeared on Puff Daddy's track "P.E. 2000". Her much-delayed debut album, All Woman, was released in 1997.

Rodríguez had a daughter, Lexus.

She died in hospice from lung cancer on November 6, 2022, at the age of 52.

== Discography ==
=== Studio albums ===
- All Woman (1997)
- Mami & Papi with Thirstin Howl III (2013)

=== Singles ===
- "Padre Nuestro (Our Father)" on Red Hot + Latin: Silencio = Muerte
- "Somebody Else"
- 2004 feature from the Tony Touch album The Reggaetony Album
