= Dirty Acres =

Studio album by CunninLynguists
- Released: November 27, 2007
- Recorded: 2006–2007
- Genres: Hip-hop; Southern hip-hop
- Length: 46:08
- Labels: APOS Music; Bad Taste
- Producer: Kno

CunninLynguists chronology
A Piece of Strange (2006)	Dirty Acres (2007)	Strange Journey Volume One (2009)

Singles from Dirty Acres
- 1. "Mexico / Wonderful" Released: December 5, 2007

Professional ratings
Review scores
Source	Rating
The A.V. Club	B+
Exclaim!	Favorable
HipHopDX	4/5 stars
Jive	4/5 stars
Laut.de	5/5 stars
Okayplayer	4/5 stars
RapReviews.com	(8.5/10)
Remix	4/5 stars
Room Thirteen	(11/13)
WBZ	5/5 stars
XLR8R	4/5 stars

Dirty Acres is the fourth studio album by American hip-hop group CunninLynguists. It was released November 27, 2007 on APOS Music and Bad Taste Records. The album is entirely produced by Kno and features guest appearances from Big Rube, Devin the Dude, Phonte of Little Brother, Witchdoctor of Dungeon Family, Sheisty Khrist and Club Dub.

== Release and promotion ==
"Mexico" and "Wonderful" were released together as joint singles from the album on December 5, 2007. Dirty Acres is the first project from CunninLynguists to be released through their independent label APOS Music and Bad Taste Records.

== Reception ==
The album was generally received very well amongst critics, with Del F. Cowie of Exclaim! saying about Deacon the Villain and Natti: "their verses are blessed with vivid insight and introspection into everyday life that reveal more with every listen" and Nathan Rabin of A.V Club saying about Kno and the group's lyrics: "Their stellar new CD Dirty Acres finds house producer Kno perfecting a moody sound while the group's lyrics explore sensuality, spirituality, and politics with smarts and conviction.

== Track listing ==
No.	Title	Length
1.	"Never" (featuring Big Rube)	3:05
2.	"Valley of Death"	2:35
3.	"Dirty Acres"	4:02
4.	"Kentucky (Interlude)"	0:49
5.	"K.K.K.Y."	2:19
6.	"Wonderful" (featuring Devin the Dude)	3:27
7.	"Yellow Lines" (featuring Phonte and Witchdoctor)	4:55
8.	"The Park (Fresh Air)"	3:18
9.	"Summer's Gone"	1:49
10.	"They Call Me (Interlude)"	0:44
11.	"Gun" (featuring Sheisty Khrist)	3:13
12.	"Dance for Me"	3:20
13.	"Georgia"	3:50
14.	"Things I Dream"	4:18
15.	"Mexico" (featuring Club Dub)	4:24
Total length:		46:08

== Personnel ==
Credits for Dirty Acres adapted from AllMusic.

- Willie Eames – bass (tracks 7, 13), guitar (tracks: 4–5, 7–8, 13, 15)
- Kno – producer (all tracks)
- EF Cuttin – scratches (tracks: 3, 4, 12)
