= Hype (magazine) =

South African hip hop magazine

Hype SA
- Editor: Rudzani Netshiheni
- Former editors: Simone Harris
- Categories: Hip hop
- Frequency: Quarterly
- Founded: 2004
- Company: Panorama Media Corp
- Country: South Africa
- Language: English
- Website: hypemagazine.co.za

Hype SA (often just Hype Magazine) is a hip hop publication in South Africa. It was launched as a print magazine in 2004 and published quarterly by Panorama Media Corp. In April 2016, it officially transitioned to a fully digital format; the print version ceased regular publication, with collector's-edition hard-copies released only as special issues.

Hype SA is noted as the only South African publication dedicated exclusively to hip hop culture.
