= Sadistik =

American rapper

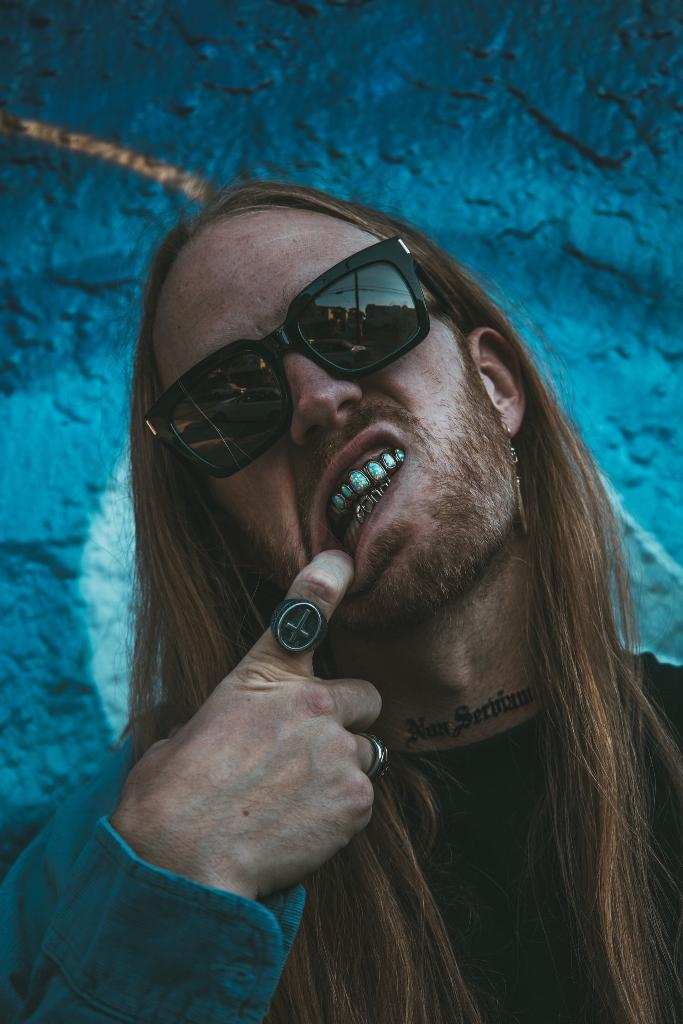
- Sadistik in 2023

Background information
- Born: Cody Foster; April 20, 1986 (age 40); Yakima, Washington, U.S.
- Origin: Seattle, Washington, U.S.
- Genre: Alternative hip-hop
- Occupation: Rapper
- Years active: 2007–present
- Labels: Equal Vision; Fake Four Inc.; Clockwork Grey
- Spouse: Alexis Foster
- Website: sadistikmusic.com

Cody Foster, better known by his stage name Sadistik, is an American alternative hip-hop artist from Seattle, Washington.

== Education ==
Sadistik went to Eisenhower High School in Yakima, Washington and received a B.A. in both Psychology and Sociology at Central Washington University.

== Career ==
In 2008, Sadistik released his debut album The Balancing Act independently on Clockwork Grey Music.

In 2013, he released his sophomore LP Flowers for My Father on Fake Four Inc, which received positive reviews. Vibe Magazine called the album "gripping & emotional". The album appeared on the top 15 hip-hop/rap charts on iTunes.

On July 1, 2014, he released his third LP Ultraviolet. The album reached #12 on the iTunes Hip Hop Charts independently and held the #1 spot on CMJ Radio for 2 weeks.

On April 14, 2017, he released his fourth LP Altars on Equal Vision Records. The album received positive reviews and peaked at number 13 on the Billboard Heatseekers Albums chart, number 35 on the Independent Albums chart, as well as number 29 on the Rap Albums chart.

On April 20, 2019, he released his fifth LP, Haunted Gardens, which broke the top 3 rap albums on iTunes independently

On April 1, 2022, he released his sixth LP, Bring Me Back When The World Is Cured, with Kno of CunninLynguists.

Sadistik's single "The Moon Smiled Back at Me" was featured in the 2023 A24 film Talk To Me, directed by Danny and Michael Philippou (also known as RackaRacka).

In 2024, he released his seventh and eighth LP: Oblivion Theater on February 23 and At Night the Silence Eats Me on October 25.

== Musical style ==
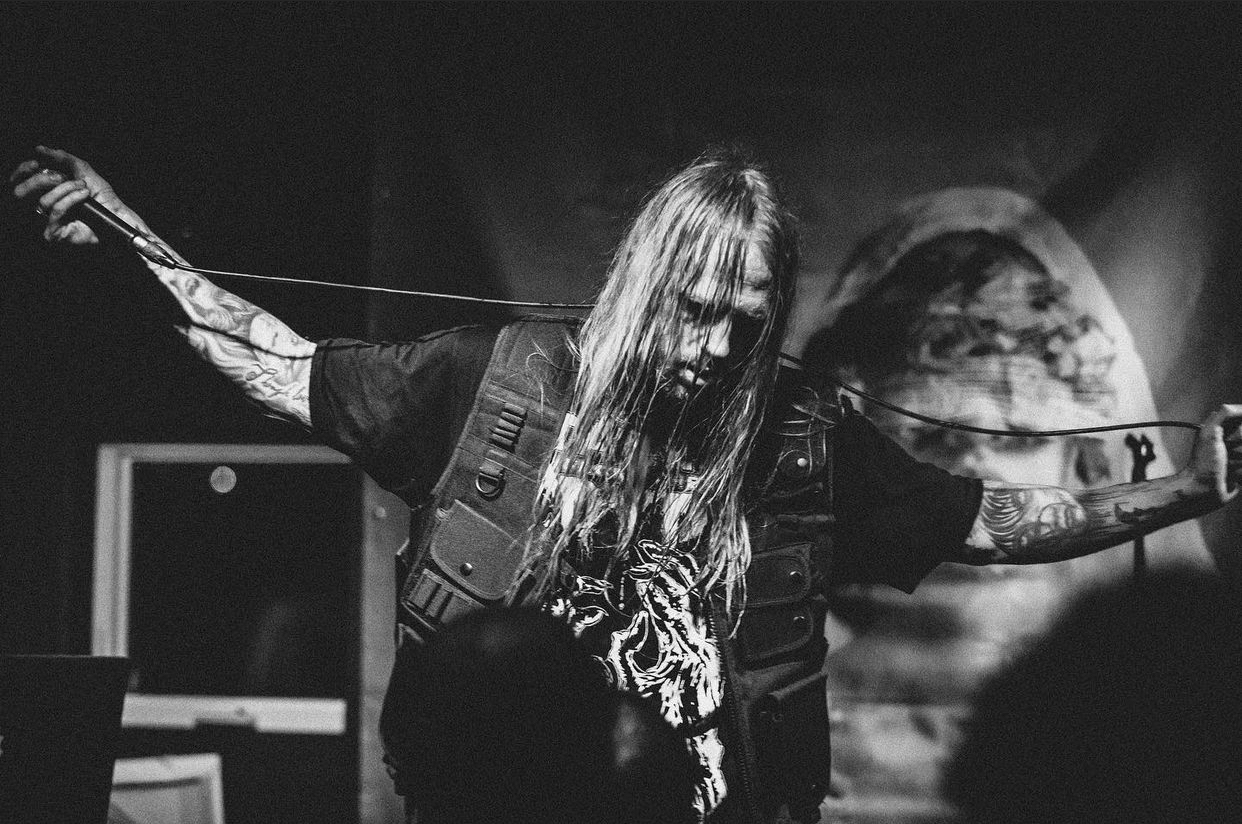
Sadistik performing in 2021

Sadistik has been described as "showing his scars with each song he writes" and "the cigarette burn rap king". Sadistik has been closely associated with the late hip-hop artist Eyedea and has been known for "a unique style of hip-hop, one that features dark imagery, dense wordplay, and nontraditional production styles."

== Discography ==
Albums

- The Balancing Act (Clockwork Grey Music, 2008)
- Flowers for My Father (Fake Four Inc., 2013)
- Ultraviolet (Fake Four Inc., 2014)
- Altars (2017)
- Haunted Gardens (2019)
- Bring Me Back When The World Is Cured (2022) (with Kno)
- Oblivion Theater (2024) (with Maulskull)
- At Night the Silence Eats Me (2024)

EPs

- The Art of Dying (Clockwork Grey Music / Best Kept Records, 2010) (with Kid Called Computer)
- Prey for Paralysis (F to I to X, 2011) (with Kristoff Krane)
- Phantom Limbs (2015) (with Kno)
- Salo Sessions (2016)
- Salo Sessions II (2018)
- Delirium (2020)
- Elysium (2020)
- L'appel du Vide (2021)
- The Vacants (2025) (with Nowhere2Run)

Compilations

- Features & Free Songs (2012)

Guest appearances

- The MC Type – "Damaged" (2012)
- No Bird Sing – "Vinestar" from Definition Sickness (2013)
- CunninLynguists and Aesop Rock – "Castles" from "Strange Journey Volume 3 (2014)
- Early Adopted – "Teeth to Dust" from A Landlocked Autumn (2015)
- HatePH34R – "Not Alone" from Thorazine Dreams (2017)
- backxwash – "ZIGOLO" from "HIS HAPPINESS SHALL COME FIRST... (2022)"
- COOLETHAN – "Shine" from You Can Never Go Back (2024)
