= Kno (musician) =

American rapper

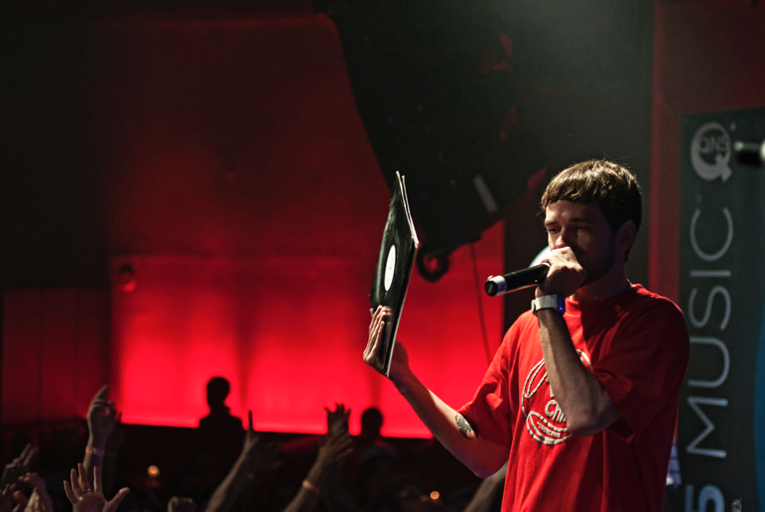
- Kno performing in 2011

Background information
- Also known as: KnoKash; Ryan Hathaway
- Born: Ryan Dean Wisler
- Origin: Atlanta, Georgia
- Genres: Hip-hop, alternative hip-hop
- Occupations: Rapper, producer, singer
- Years active: 1999–present
- Labels: QN5 Music, APOS Music

Ryan Dean Wisler, better known by his stage name Kno, is an American alternative hip-hop rapper, producer, and singer. He is a founding member of the hip-hop groups CunninLynguists and Built to Fade. Kno is currently signed to QN5 Music and APOS Music. In 2010, Kno was named "one of the top loop-miners east of the Mississippi" by URB.

== History ==
Kno first became known as a prominent hip-hop producer and rapper through the indie hip-hop group CunninLynguists, which consists of him, Deacon the Villain and Natti. In 2004, he released his remixed version of Jay-Z's album The Black Album, called Kno vs Hov – The White Albulum. Between 2004 and 2006, he released a series of hip-hop instrumentals, named Excrementals.

In 2010, Kno released his debut solo album Death Is Silent, which was critically acclaimed, with URB Magazine giving the album 4.5/5, saying "Easily one of the top five most satisfying hip-hop albums of the year and possibly one of the year's ten best genre-wide." and HipHopDX giving it a 4/5 saying: "This makes the production on Death is Silent that much more poignant as Kno chose to go across the Atlantic rather than across the Mississippi when it came to mining sounds for one of the year’s strongest collection of beats." In 2013, Kno formed a new group, Built to Fade, with vocalists Dane Ferguson, Zoe Wick and Anna Wise (of Sonnymoon). The band released their debut album, To Dust, on November 12.

== Discography ==
=== Studio albums ===
Solo

- Death Is Silent (2010)
- Bones (2016)

Collaborations

- Machete Vision (2011) (with Marq Spekt)
- Bring Me Back When the World Is Cured (2022) (with Sadistik)

with CunninLynguists

- Will Rap for Food (2001)
- SouthernUnderground (2003)
- A Piece of Strange (2005)
- Dirty Acres (2007)
- Oneirology (2011)
- Rose Azura Njano (2017)

with Built to Fade

- To Dust (2013)
- Lies in Nostalgia (2020)

=== Other releases ===
EPs

- Phantom Limbs (2015) (with Sadistik)

Remix albums

- Kno vs Hov – The White Albulum (2004)

Mixtapes

- Excrementals Vol. 1 (2004)
- Excrementals Vol. 2 (2004)
- Excrementals Vol. 3 (2004)
- Excrementals Vol. 4 (2006)
- Excrementals Vol. 5 (2006)

=== Production credits ===
- Jugga the Bully – "Tha Jugganaut's Comin'", "Pressure", "Feel Me", "Sh*t Is Bangin", "Anachronisms" and "You Dat" from Hostile Takeover (1999)
- Tonedeff – "Love Ain't (Remix)" from Underscore (2003)
- Substantial – "Arrogant" from Substantial Evidence (2003)
- iCON the Mic King – "Ahead of My Time" from Rent Money Music (2003)
- Braille – "Right This Moment" from Shades Of Grey (2004)
- Oktober – "Stay in Line" from Project:Building (2004)
- Tonedeff – "Loyal" from Archetype (2005)
- PackFM – "Excuses", "Ugly Woman" and "Forevershine" from WhutduzFMstand4? (2006)
- Pizon – "Say Goodbye" and "Four Letters" from I Am Hip Hop (2006)
- Celph Titled – "Clap" and "616 Rewind" from The Gatalog: A Collection Of Chaos (2006)
- Elemental Zazen – "No Survivors" and "Hanging by a Thread" from The Glass Should Be Full (2008)
- Inverse – "Til The End (C.A.L.I.)" and "Look Around" from So Far (The Collection) (2008)
- Braille – "Get It Right" from The IV Edition (2008)
- Substantial – "It's You (I Think)" from Sacrifice (2008)
- PackFM – "Wanna Know" from I F*cking Hate Rappers (2010)
- Freddie Gibbs – "The Coldest" from Str8 Killa (2010)
- Deacon the Villain and Sheisty Khrist – "A Million Miles" and "Black Dog" from Niggaz With Latitude (2010)
- Sadistik – "Kill the King" from Flowers for My Father (2013)
- Natti – "Another Galaxy", "Just Like You" and "Filthy Hard" from Still Motion (2013)
