= CunninLynguists =

American hip-hop group

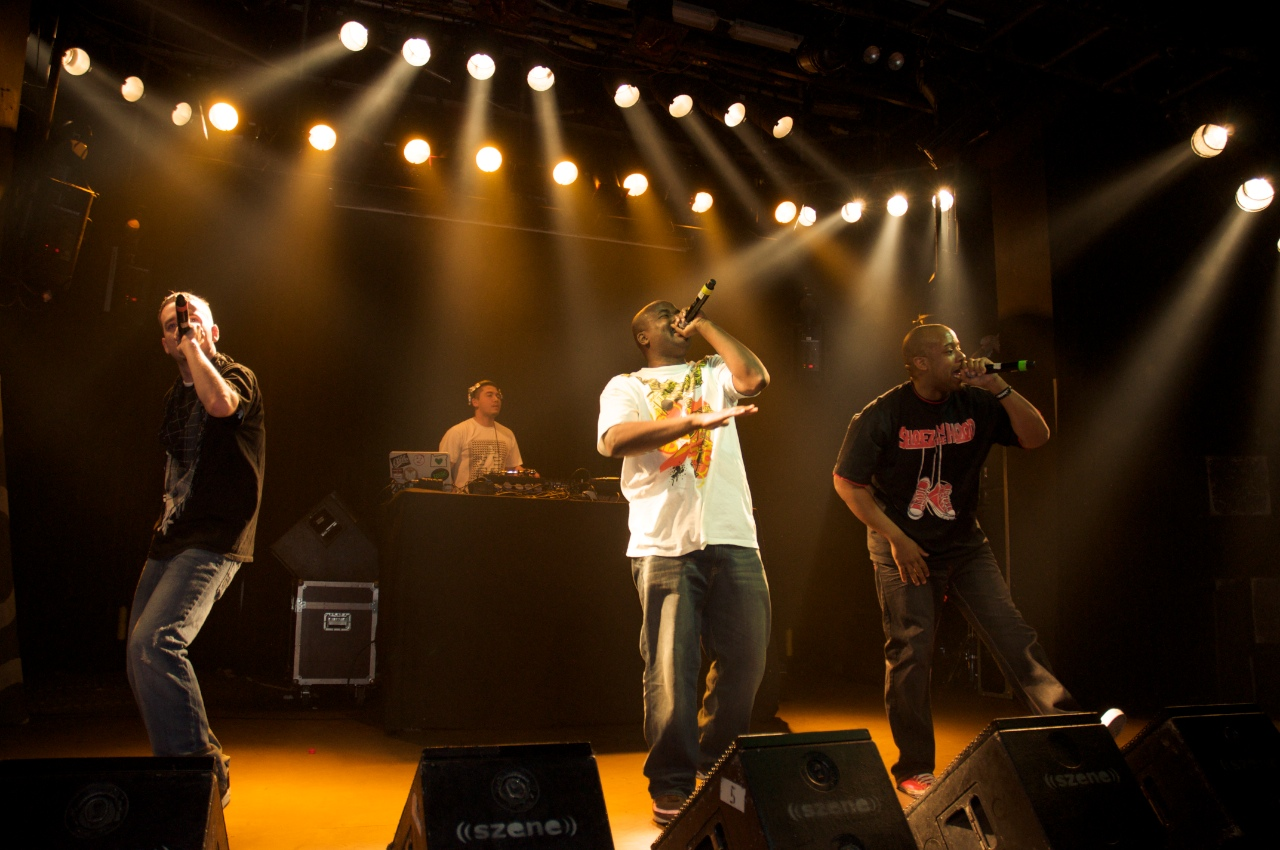
- CunninLynguists performing live in 2009

Background information
- Origin: Lexington, Kentucky, U.S.
- Genres: Hip-hop; Southern hip-hop; conscious hip-hop
- Years active: 2000–present
- Labels: Freshchest; LA Underground; APOS Music; QN5 Music
- Members: Kno; Deacon the Villain; Natti
- Past members: Mr. SOS
- Website: www.cunninlynguists.com

CunninLynguists is an American hip-hop group from Lexington, Kentucky. The group consists of Deacon the Villain, Kno, and Natti. The name is a portmanteau of cunning, linguists, and cunnilingus.

== Beginnings ==
In 1999, Deacon the Villain and Kno met at Club Kaya in Atlanta, Georgia at an event for the (later defunct) Blaze Magazine that included members of Atlanta's own Dungeon Family. They had talked online previously through an emcee named Jugga the Bully, who Deacon invited to an open mic he helped throw called "Underground Live" at the Morehouse College campus, which Deacon attended. At the time, Kno was in the group The Continuum, and Deacon was in the group Illstar. Deacon soon returned to his home state of Kentucky and Kno eventually followed. Following several discussions about working together, the two planned an EP where Kno was only producing and Deacon was rhyming, but soon Kno contributed as an emcee as well.

== Musical career ==
=== 2001–2005: Will Rap for Food, SouthernUnderground and Sloppy Seconds ===
The group's debut studio album, Will Rap for Food, was released in October 2001, and was described by Pitchfork Media as "a solid, accessible debut, filled with clever rhymes and tremendously consistent production".

In April 2003, Mr. SOS joined the group on the album SouthernUnderground, which was independently released on Freshchest Records. The album featured guests including Masta Ace, Supastition and others, alongside production from Domingo and RJD2, but again mostly Kno. M.F. DiBella of AllMusic commented on "a lyrical deftness and genuine feel for the music rarely seen in the bling-conscious rap of the latter-day era".

The group landed a distribution contract with Caroline Distribution in 2004, and SouthernUnderground was the first project re-released after inking the deal with Will Rap For Food being re-released shortly thereafter in 2005.

Throughout 2003–2005, the group toured throughout the U.S. and Canada, appearing onstage alongside notable acts such as Nappy Roots, Cee-Lo Green of Goodie Mob and touring extensively with People Under the Stairs, Raekwon of Wu-Tang Clan and Brand Nubian.

The group also released the mixtapes Sloppy Seconds Volume One in 2003 and Sloppy Seconds Vol. 2 in 2005.

=== 2006–2008: Mr. SOS leaves, Natti joins, A Piece of Strange and Dirty Acres ===
Following SouthernUnderground, Mr. SOS left the group on peaceful terms. Soon after, the two remaining members met Natti, a fellow Kentucky emcee. Deacon and Kno describe his joining as a casual process, with Natti already being featured on Sloppy Seconds Vol. 2 and being involved in Deacon's side group Kynfolk. Natti would be the final member to join the group and end its formation.

CunninLynguists released the third studio album, A Piece of Strange, on January 24, 2006, via Caroline Records and Groove Attack Distribution. It features guest spots included Cee-Lo Green, Immortal Technique and Tonedeff, among others, and is entirely produced by Kno. The album marked a significant turning point in the group's musical career, with the members turning their lyrics and music into more passionate material, and minimizing their "silliness". Hype gave the album a five star review describing it as "the best album of the last 12 months". URB gave the album four stars, describing it as "a piece of beauty, a soulful and sweeping assemblage of cuts that ride a steady wave of infectious momentum", and The A.V. Club commented on Kno's "masterful, adventurous production".

The release of A Piece of Strange also saw their profile rise and cultivating a bigger and dedicated fanbase, as they toured abroad multiple times in support of the release, appearing live alongside notable acts such as Kanye West, Pharrell Williams, and The Strokes.

CunninLynguists released their fourth studio album, Dirty Acres, on November 27, 2007, through a joint venture between their own label APOS Music and Swedish-based label Bad Taste Records. Produced entirely by Kno, it features artists such as Devin the Dude, Phonte of Little Brother and Witchdoctor, and was described by CMJ New Music Monthly as "a defiant album that questions everything, even the assumed standards of hip hop". CunninLynguists made their way across the United States, Europe and Canada in support of the album, headlining the Dirty Acres Tour in 3 parts over the course of 2008.

=== 2009–2013: Oneirology and Strange Journey Volumes One and Two ===
The group released two mixtapes in 2009, Strange Journey Volume One and Strange Journey Volume Two. On March 22, 2011, the group released the fifth studio album, Oneirology. HipHopDX said about the album: "This project combines creative sounds with inventive rhymes and stands as an example of how a great group can come together to craft a well-made album worthy of praise." Its concept revolves around Oneirology, the scientific study of dreams.

=== 2014–present: Strange Journey Volume Three ===
In 2014, CunninLynguists released a mixtape, Strange Journey Volume Three. It was curated entirely by the group's fans who gave feedback on and suggested ideas for song concepts, features, packaging, and artwork. It features guest appearances from Aesop Rock, Del the Funky Homosapien, and Murs.

The same year, CunninLynguists' lexicon was also found to be one of the richest among rappers who perform in English.

In 2017, the group released the sixth studio album, Rose Azura Njano. It features guest appearances from Jason Coffey, Trizz, and Farah Elle.

== Name ==
The name CunninLynguists is a play on the terms "cunnilingus" and "linguists". When the group was first forming, Deacon and Kno casually came up with the name, not intending for it to be permanent nor serious, instead only wanting listeners to not take their music as seriously as their music sounded.

== Style ==
At the group's beginning, members Kno and Deacon focused on energetic wordplay and outlandish rhymes, only at times delving into deeper and more introspective material, such as "Mic Like a Memory" or "Family Ties" from Will Rap For Food. This continued up until their critically acclaimed album A Piece of Strange, which featured more serious songs, such as "Brain Cell", and playful ones, such as "Beautiful Girl". The group has been applauded for their ability to craft poetic songs that are also very musically enjoyable.

== Members ==
Kno and Deacon the Villain are the founding members of the group, who appear on all the Cunninlynguists albums. The duo was briefly accompanied by Mr. SOS for their sophomore album SouthernUnderground, before the addition of Kentucky-based emcee Natti as a permanent member in 2004 (who is featured on all material since the 2005 release of Sloppy Seconds Volume 2). Natti released his first solo album, Still Motion, on September 24 (September 30 in CD form).

== Discography ==
=== Studio albums ===
- Will Rap for Food (2001)
- SouthernUnderground (2003)
- A Piece of Strange (2006)
- Dirty Acres (2007)
- Oneirology (2011)
- Rose Azura Njano (2017)
- The Heartstring Theory (Part One) (2024)
- The Heartstring Theory (Part Two) (2025)

=== Mixtapes ===
- Sloppy Seconds Volume One (2003)
- Sloppy Seconds Vol. 2 (2005)
- Strange Journey Volume One (2009)
- Strange Journey Volume Two (2009)
- Strange Journey Volume Three (2014)

=== EPs ===
- The WinterFire EP (2014) (with The Grouch and Eligh)
- The Rose EP (2017)
- The Azura EP (2017)

=== Singles ===
- "So Live!" (2001)
- "Seasons" (2002)
- "Dirtay" (2004)
- "Yellow Lines" (2007)
- "Mexico" b/w "Wonderful" (2007)
- "Never Come Down (The Brownie Song)" (2009)
- "Don't Leave (When Winter Comes)" (2009)
- "Stars Shine Brightest (in the Darkest of Nights)" (2012)
- "Oh Honey" (2017)
- ”Forever” (2024)
