= Deacon the Villain =

American singer

- Also known as: Deacon Da Villain
- Born: Willis Garnett Polk II; May 21, 1979 (age 47)
- Origin: Versailles, Kentucky
- Genres: Hip hop; alternative hip hop
- Occupations: Rapper; producer
- Years active: 2000-present
- Labels: QN5 Music; APOS Music

Willis Garnett Polk II, better known by his stage name Deacon the Villain, is an American hip hop recording artist and record producer from Versailles, Kentucky. He is a founding member of the hip hop group CunninLynguists. Deacon has produced for the likes of KRS-One, King Tee, and J-Ro from Tha Liks, among others. Deacon the Villain has been featured in notable journalism sources such as XXL, Pop Matters, HipHopDX, and Exclaim!, among others.

== History ==
Deacon is a lifelong friend of the activist Shaun King; they both attended Woodford County High School in Versailles, Kentucky, and were roommates at Morehouse College in Atlanta, Georgia.

In 1999, Deacon the Villain and Kno met at Club Kaya in Atlanta, Georgia at an event for the now defunct Blaze Magazine that included various members of Atlanta's own Dungeon Family. They had talked online previously through an emcee named Jugga the Bully, who appeared at an open mic called Underground Live at Morehouse college campus, which was held by Deacon. At the time, Kno was in the group The Continuum, and Deacon was in the group ILLSTAR. Afterwards, the two disbanded from their former groups and created CunninLynguists. The two also founded a production duo named A Piece Of Strange.

Around 2004, Deacon formed the group Kynfolk with Natti. The two got along so well that Deacon and Kno invited Natti to join CunninLynguists.

Deacon released his first full-length project not in CunninLynguists with JustMe, named Tragedy & Dope. The same year, he released Niggaz With Latitude (N.W.L.) with Sheisty Khrist, another Kentucky emcee.

In 2015, he released his first solo album Peace or Power. The album is self-produced and guest appearances include Tonedeff, Kno and Homeboy Sandman, among others.

== Personal life ==
Willis Polk II's hip hop alias comes from the fact that his father is a Christian Pastor. Growing up, he was raised in a baptist family and has stayed Christian. Members of his family have featured on multiple albums of his, such as his mother singing on A Piece of Strange or various family members providing vocals for his first solo album in 2015, Peace or Power.

== Discography ==
Studio albums

- Peace or Power (2015)

Collaborative albums

- Tragedy & Dope (2010) (with JustMe)
- Niggaz With Latitude (N.W.L.) (2010) (with Sheisty Khrist)

Guest appearances

- Mark J - "My Peoples" from City Of Pain (2003)
- Tonedeff - "" from Underscore (2003)
- W.A.S.T.E.L.A.N.D.S. - "Sprinkle Of God" from Rise Of An Empire (2005)
- Inverse - "Til The End (C.A.L.I.)" from So Far (The Collection) (2008)
- Substantial - "Resurrection Of The House Party" from Sacrifice (2008)
- Rubix Funktion - "Just Think" from Presenterar 16 Beatar (2009)
- Jise One - "Burst Through The Door" from Chronicles 2 (2009)
- Kno - "Spread Your Wings" and "They Told Me" from Death Is Silent (2010)
- Natti - "Still Motion", "All I Need", "Late Night Cruise", "Filthy Hard", "G.O.R. (Gods of Rap)" and "Allegiance" from Still Motion (2013)
- Looptroop Rockers - "Naked Swedes" from Naked Swedes (2014)
- Sadistik- “Drifting” from At Night the Silence Eats Me (2024)
