= Scratch (magazine) =

Hip-hop magazine

2005 cover of Scratch

Scratch was a magazine about the art of creating hip-hop. It featured articles regarding producers, musicians and DJs that make beats for rap records, and details the secret methods, stories, partnerships, philosophies and equipment behind the music. The magazine's tagline was "The Blueprint of Hip-Hop".

== History and profile ==
Scratch was owned by Harris Publications, the same company that publishes the popular hip-hop magazine XXL, as well as King, Rides and Slam. Scratch debuted in January 2004, and was published bi-monthly. Various hip-hop producers, DJs and rappers have graced their cover, including Dr. Dre, The Neptunes, RZA, Lil Jon, Kanye West, DJ Drama, Timbaland, Jermaine Dupri, Mannie Fresh, Just Blaze and Eminem.

Starting with its March–April 2007 issue, Scratch was relaunched as XXL Presents Scratch. It then operated under the wing of XXL Magazine, with XXL's former Senior Editor, Online, Brendan Frederick, acting as the new editor-in-chief and XXL's current editor-in-chief, Elliott Wilson, overseeing the magazine as the editorial director.

It was announced that the Nov–Dec 2007 issue of Scratch (with Timbaland and 50 Cent on the cover) would be the final issue of the magazine. Harris Publications folded the magazine for unknown reasons.
