= PackFM =

American rapper

- Origin: Brooklyn, New York, United States
- Genre: Hip hop
- Occupations: Hip hop artist, producer, visual artist
- Instrument: Vocals
- Years active: 1998–2014
- Label: QN5 Music
- Website: qn5.com/artists/packfm%20qn5.com/artists/packfm

Omar Rogelio Tull (born June 11, 1977), better known by his stage name PackFM, is an American Underground hip hop artist and producer from Brooklyn, New York City. As a teenager in the mid-1990s, PackFM began his battle career, winning numerous prestigious freestyle titles. These wins include the 88HipHop MC Battle Champion, where he was inducted into their Hall of Fame after four undefeated months, Braggin Rites tournament in 1999, Everlast Harlem Lyricist Championship in 2003, and three undefeated months in the 24 Hour MC Battle sponsored by TDK.

PackFM's recording career began in 1998, with his single "Hit List" getting frequent airplay on Hot 97 New York. Around 2000, PackFM joined and began to collaborate with QN5 label founder Tonedeff. After releasing the Extended F@mm EP Happy F*ck You Songs with Tonedeff, Substantial, and Session in 2002, PackFM has released two studio albums, 2006's whutduzFMstand4, which won UndergroundHipHop.com's People's Choice Album of the Year, and 2010's I F*cking Hate Rappers, which was featured on multiple "Best Of 2010" lists from sources such as 2DopeBoyz and HipHop DX. He has also worked on countless collaborations that have spawned a series of Featured Material releases. Since joining the QN5 label, PackFM has headlined and supported tours along with fellow labelmates Tonedeff and Cunninlynguists both nationally and internationally through Canada, Europe, and Australia. He's also performed with Hip Hop superstars like Ghostface Killah, Common, Slick Rick, among others.

Throughout his career, PackFM and his music have been featured in many different mediums. PackFM's film credits include an award-winning Dutch documentary titled "Kika NY", and, alongside Questlove, Mos Def, and other prominent emcees, "Freestyle: The Art of Rhyme", which won multiple awards at film festivals around the United States. PackFM has had two television spots, one for MTV Hip Hop Week in 2003, and another for the Ford Edge in 2007. In print, he's had features in XXL, The Source Magazine, "URB" and Rolling Stone Magazine. PackFM contributed a remixed version of "Click, Clack, Spray" for the soundtrack to Marc Ecko's Getting Up. The soundtrack went on to win two awards, one for Best Licensed Music from GameSpot and the MTV VMA for Best Video Game Soundtrack. In 2008, PackFM starred in a G4 Freestyle 101 episode.

PackFM was working on his third and final solo album, The Human Highlight Reel and a new Extended F@mm record, along with co-hosting a weekly podcast, Tacos and Chocolate Milk, with long-time collaborator and friend Tonedeff before going on hiatus from performing in 2013. His last official feature was on the track "Lucky" off of Tonedeff's EP Hunter.

== Biography ==
=== Early life ===
PackFM was born and raised in Brooklyn, New York. During much of his youth, he had less of an interest in MCing than another element of hip hop, graffiti. PackFM attended LaGuardia High School, where he began to gain an appreciation for hip hop music and battle rapping after watching A Tribe Called Quest's "Check the Rhime". During high school, PackFM would battle in ciphers both in school and outside of hip hop shows. After receiving his G.E.D., PackFM briefly attended Brooklyn College. While at Brooklyn College he began to run a hip hop radio show, which led to him making many industry connections and eventually bringing him back into the New York freestyle scene.

=== Freestyle competitions (1997–2000) ===
PackFM quickly rose to the top of countless major freestyle battles during the late 1990s and early 2000s. In 1998, PackFM became the 88HipHop MC Battle Champion, and retained it for four months before retiring. He was inducted into the 88HipHop MC Battle Hall of Fame soon after. During the next year, he won the Braggin' Rites, Next Generation Battle, and TDK's 24 Hour MC Battle tournaments (the latter of which he retained his top spot for 3 straight months). During his reign, he battled against many other prominent 1990s battle rappers who would lead to collaborations with underground scenes around the United States, including Poison Pen, Eyedea, Pumpkinhead, Apathy, among others.

While PackFM was dominating freestyle tournaments, he also maintained a consistent flow of recorded singles and collaborations. His first single, "Hit List" in 1998, was immediately played in heavy rotation by Hot97 New York.

PackFM's memorable persona led to him being cast in numerous documentaries about New York hip hop culture, including the Dutch documentary Kika NY in 1999 and the award-winning Freestyle: The Art of Rhyme in 2000.

=== QN5, Extended F@mm (2000–2004) ===
After dominating the battle scene, PackFM set out to do something very few freestyle battlers do successfully; create quality music in studio. His opportunity to do just this came to fruition when he began collaborating with Tonedeff, the founder of underground record label QN5 Music, whom he battled previously. The duo came together in 2000 to create a track for the Napster/Rapstation.com Power to the People and Beats contest, where they made it to the top six finalists.

In 2000, PackFM released his first mixtape Featured Material Volume One independently, which included a mixture of freestyles, past singles, and battles. In 2001 he released his first solo 12" single "Freestyle Marathon" through the now defunct Bronx Science label. The A side of the single was produced by Celph Titled and the B side was produced by PackFM himself and featured Rise and Wordsworth.

During 2002, PackFM released two group collaborations as well. First was The Plague's initial LP Gang Green, a large group album including QN5 labelmates, Talib Kweli, Jin, and Pumpkinhead. November 2002 saw the release of Extended F@mm's EP Happy F*ck You Songs. Extended F@mm is a collection of Tonedeff and PackFM and their underground hip hop friends Substantial, Session. Urban Smarts gave the EP a 65 "dope" rating, declaring the intensity of the battle rhymes can "rip you to lyrical shreds" with the consistent humor element being an added strength to the record. Matt Jost of Rap Reviews further declared that Happy F*ck You Songs was one of "the most innovative posse cut[s] since – well, in a long time." This EP led to a spot during MTV Hip Hop Week alongside Tonedeff.

After the release of Happy F*ck You Songs, PackFM maintained an incredibly fast recording pace. Both the solo compilation Featured Material Vol. 2 and the QN5 compilation Asterisk: Two were released by QN5 Music in 2003. 2004 saw another couple of compilation releases, Asterisk: Three by QN5 Music and The Plague's sophomore effort 28 Tracks Later, the latter of which the original crew, with a few additions including a remixed G-Unit track featuring 50 Cent.

=== whutduzFMstand4? (2003–2008) ===
Throughout the large output of compilations and collaborations, PackFM was working on something much more ambitious; a full solo studio album. PackFM released two singles for whutduzFMstand4? prior to its release; "Forevershine/Upclose & Personal/Set It Up" in 2004 and "Stomp/Complex Simplicity" in 2005.

The 2005 QN5 Megashow was a major turning point in PackFM's career, as his stage presence and working of the crowd, while nursing an injured ankle, led to a label executive bidding war. Although majors were interested, PackFM went with the independent Avatar Records for distribution to maintain creative freedom. This perk of interest also led to a video game appearance, with P. Diddy choosing "Click, Clack and Spray" to be featured on Marc Ecko's Getting Up and on the B-side of a promotional 12" for the game, with the A-side having past collaborator Talib Kweli with Rakim's "Getting Up Anthem."

Originally projected to be released in Spring of 2004, the album was eventually released in September 2006. The album was met with critical acclaim from reviewers and underground hip hop fans alike. MVRemix gave the album a 9/10. Max Herman of XLR8R gave the album a positive review, stating, "as this album has been so many years in the making, Pack aptly makes every moment count." Later that year, whutduzFMstand4 was announced UndergroundHipHop.com's 2006 People's Choice Award for Album of the Year.

Asterisk: 4 was released in 2007 by QN5 Music, involving many PackFM collaborations as the past three have. That year, he performed in The Brooklyn Hip-Hop Festival, which was headlined that year by Ghostface Killah.

=== I F*cking Hate Rappers (2008–2011) ===
On Valentine's Day, 2008, QN5 Music released the Baby Blue for Pink EP, with PackFM contributing the song "Plucking Daisies." G4's Freestyle 101 Series featured PackFM a couple months later.

In 2009, PackFM was a nominee for Best Lyricist at the Underground Hip Hop Awards. That same year, he was featured on the track "Hypnotize" for Cunninlynguists album Strange Journey, Vol. 1.

PackFM set out to write a follow-up solo album to whutduzFMstand4?. The record turned into the concept album I F*cking Hate Rappers, a passionate (and often humorous) condemnation of the present climate of Hip Hop. The album was released May 5, 2010. I F*cking Hate Rappers was met with even more universal acclaim than his previous effort. A Wu Tang Corp review gave the album a 4/5 and said it "could be a classic and serve as what rap albums should be." Nicholas Candiotto of Potholes in my Blog also gave I F*cking Hate Rappers a 4/5, calling the album "a breath of fresh air." There were some reviewers who found his theme as too repetitive or that he complained too much, such as Jon Garcia of KevinNottingham.com. However, HipHopDX gave the album yet another 4/5 X rating, claiming that it will be remembered as an extremely significant album in years to come. Absolutely Positive, the final "bonus" track on the album, spent multiple weeks on College Radio charts.

=== Featured Material Volume 4 and Tacos and Chocolate Milk (2011–2013) ===
After supporting tours for I F*ckin Hate Rappers around the United States and Europe with Cunninlynguists, PackFM began to yet again branch out to new ventures, this time outside of emceeing completely. He also announced plans for his new solo project, The Human Highlight Reel, which was reported by Aboveground Magazine in November 2011.

In May 2012, PackFM and Tonedeff began the Tacos and Chocolate Milk (TaCM) podcast, an approximately one-hour-long show where they discuss nothing in particular. Some recurring segments include "Yo Pack!" and "Evil Tony". The show occasionally has guests, such as Kno of Cunninlynguists and Mr. Mecca. Support behind this endeavor grew very quickly, as Paste Magazine listed the show in their July "Ten Best Music Podcasts" article, and it was also featured in the iTunes New and Noteworthy section. As of Episode No. 24, the podcast has amassed over one million downloads.

PackFM's fourth Featured Material Volume 4 was released on June 19, 2012. Aside from the usual rarities and collaborations, a handful of stand-up bits performed by PackFM are included. PackFM announced on the TaCM podcast that he wants to pursue stand-up comedy.

Late August-early September saw PackFM's most recent tour, a far-reaching West Coast trip with Johnny October. During an interview with 88toInfinity in September 2012, PackFM announced that Human Highlight Reel, would be his final solo PackFM album, with a final EP preceding it titled The Speaker King. Further, it will be recorded on stage with a live band and audience all the way through in a single take, as he calls it, it will be his "show and prove album." However, he said that he will still do collaborations with QN5 artists. On December 21, 2012, PackFM released a single titled "12" with members of The Plague.

=== Hiatus (2014–present) ===
PackFM's rap career went on official hiatus in the years after FM Volume 4 was released. His last official feature was on "Lucky" by Tonedeff. He has performed on occasion since then (including the finale of WNYU's Halftime Show), along with stand up gigs.

== Discography ==
=== Studio albums ===
- whutduzFMstand4?
  - Released: September 2006
  - Label: QN5 Music
- I F*cking Hate Rappers
  - Released: April 2010
  - Label: QN5 Music
- The Speaker King (EP)
  - Released: TBA
  - Label: QN5 Music
- The Human Highlight Reel
  - Released: TBA
  - Label: QN5 Music

=== Solo compilations ===
- Featured Material Vol. 1
  - Released: April 2001
  - Label: QN5 Music
- Featured Material Vol. 2
  - Released: April 2003
  - Label: QN5 Music
- Featured Material Vol. 3
  - Released: July 2004
  - Label: QN5 Music
- FMania: The Best (Of)
  - Released: October 2008
  - Label: QN5 Music
- Featured Material Vol. 4
  - Released: June 19, 2012
  - Label: QN5 Music

=== Group compilations ===
- Asterisk: One (as QN5 Music)
  - Released: 2002
  - Label: QN5 Music
- Gang Green (as The Plague)
  - Released: 2002
  - Label: MCMI Records/QN5 Music
- Happy F*ck You Songs (as Extended F@mm)
  - Released: November 2002
  - Label: QN5 Music
- Asterisk: Two (as QN5 Music)
  - Released: 2003
  - Label: QN5 Music
- 28 Tracks Later (as The Plague)

Released: 2004 Label: MCMI Records/QN5 Music/Red Army Inc.

- Asterisk: Three (as QN5 Music)
  - Released: 2004
  - Label: QN5 Music
- Asterisk: Four (as QN5 Music)
  - Released: 2007
  - Label: QN5 Music
- Baby Blue for Pink (as QN5 Music)
  - Released: 2008
  - Label: QN5 Music

=== Singles ===
- "Hit List"
  - Released: February 1998
  - Label: Ope Entertainment
- "Lifestyles of the Poor wit' a Fortune" feat. Chris Dubbs, O*Asiatic and Benjamin Hooks
  - Released: May 1998
  - Label: Ope Entertainment
- "Freestyle Marathon" feat. Wordsworth and Rise
  - Released: 2001
  - Label: Bronx Science Records
- "Arrogant" w/ Substantial, Tonedeff and Rise
  - Released: 2002
  - Label: Fat Beats Records
- "Soul Searchin" feat. Dutch Massive
  - Released: 2002
  - Label: Game Plan Records (UK Release)
- "This Means War" w/ iCON the Mic King
  - Released: 2002
  - Label: Indieground Rekkids
- "Most High – Live From New York" feat. The Plague
  - Released: 2002
  - Label: Nothing But Soul Records (French Release)
- "Extra" feat. Kwote Scriptures and iCON the Mic King
  - Released: 2003
  - Label: The Lost Link
- "Forever Shine" feat. J.U.I.CE. and Substantial prod. by DJ JS1
  - Released: April 2004
  - Label: QN5 Music/Third Earth Music
  - B-Sides: "Upclose & Personal" and "Set It Up"
- "Basix" ft. Tonedeff prod. by DJ JS1
  - Released: 2004
  - Label: Bomb Hiphop/Ground Original
- "Stomp" ft. The Last Emperor and Many Styles
  - Released: April 2005
  - Label: QN5 Music/Freshchest Records
  - B-Side: "Complex Simplicity"
- "Click Clack & Spray"
  - Released: April 14, 2006
  - Label: Ecko Unlmtd/Traffic
  - A-Side: "Getting Up Anthem" by Rakim & Talib Kweli

=== Film appearances ===
  - Kika NY (Television documentary 1999)
  - Freestyle: The Art of Rhyme (Feature film 2000)
  - Fuk Dat (2003)
  - Underground Masters Vol.1 (2005)
  - End of The Weak (DVD 2005)
  - FMakalishus (DVD 2006)
  - FLOW: For the Love of Words Volume 1 (Video documentary 2006)
  - Netflix: Hip-Hop Evolution – S3 E3 · Pass the Mic (2019)

== Awards ==
- 1998: 88HipHop MC Battle Champion- 4 undefeated months, Hall of Fame
- 1999: Braggin' Rites MC Battle Champion
- 1999: Next Generation Battle competition at the Nuyorican Poets Cafe
- 1999: 24 Hour MC Battle sponsored by TDK- 3 consecutive months
- 2000: The Source Unsigned Hype Live MC Battle- 2nd place
- 2000: "Power To The People And Beats" by Napster/Rapstation.com- top 6
- 2000: Rock Steady Crew's annual MC Battle- finalist
- 2003: Everlast Harlem Lyricist Championship
- 2006: UndergroundHipHop.com's Album of the Year for whutduzFMstand4?
- 2009: Underground Hip Hop Awards Best Lyricist- Nominated
