= Tonedeff =

American rapper (born 1976)

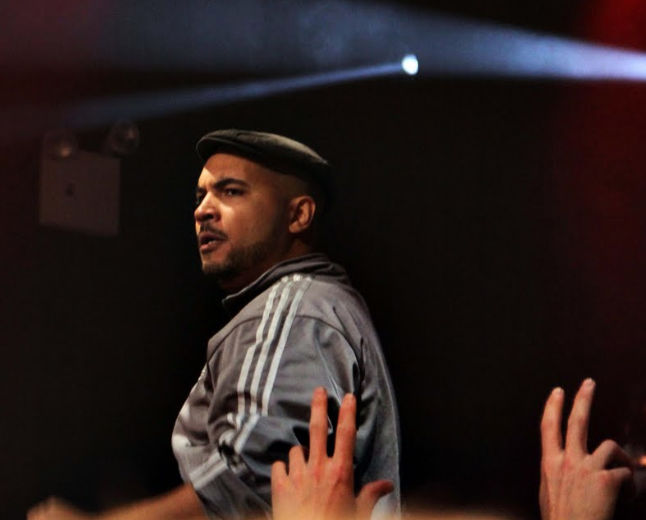
- Tonedeff performing in 2011

Background information
- Also known as: Peter Anthony Red, Trapazoyd
- Born: Pedro Antonio Rojas, Jr. December 14, 1976 (age 49)
- Origin: Newport News, Virginia, United States
- Genres: Hip-hop; alternative hip-hop; underground hip-hop
- Occupations: Rapper; singer; songwriter; record producer; visual artist; record executive
- Instruments: Vocals; piano
- Years active: 1993–present
- Label: QN5 Music
- Website: tonedeff.com

Pedro Antonio Rojas Jr. (born December 14, 1976), better known by his stage name Tonedeff, is an American rapper, producer, singer-songwriter and record executive.

Tonedeff first gained national recognition on the underground hip-hop scene after winning a string of distinguished rap battles (i.e. "Braggin Rites"), opening shows for Common, Rahzel, The Beatnuts, Royce da 5'9", and Brand Nubian. He also appeared as a guest artist on several 12" releases, including the controversial KRS-One diss track "Clear Em Out" criticizing Nelly.

Tonedeff has appeared on most of the Cunninlynguists albums, including Will Rap For Food, SouthernUnderground, A Piece of Strange, Strange Journey Volume One and Oneirology. He appeared on Immortal Technique's "Peruvian Cocaine" (on the album Revolutionary Vol. 2), playing the role of an American CIA agent in an elaborate drug trade conspiracy. He has also provided comedic skits for artists such as Masta Ace and Pumpkinhead.

Tonedeff founded the QN5 Music label in 1997 and releases music independently, with a roster that includes himself, CunninLynguists, Substantial, PackFM, Kokayi, and Extended Famm as well as a production roster that includes himself, Kno, Domingo, Deacon the Villain and Kokayi. He continues to perform and release music internationally today.

== Biography ==
=== Early life ===
Born to a Cuban mother and a Colombian father in Newport News, Virginia, Tonedeff first began writing songs at the age of nine.

=== Career beginnings ===
Tonedeff formed a group named "The RBM Crew" in 1989 with three schoolmates shortly after relocating to Miami, Florida from Chicago and began recording and performing locally at talent shows and showcases. In 1993, The RBM Crew was offered a development deal by Warner Black Music and began recording the ultimately uncompleted Calligraphy. They disbanded when the label folded in 1995.

In 1993, at the age of sixteen, Tonedeff appeared on The Arsenio Hall Show as a performer, taking the grand prize of the show's national talent search called "Flava of the Future". He alludes to this event in his song "Morethanthis".

After fielding offers from several major labels, Tonedeff decided instead to pursue a college degree in illustration and multimedia – taking a break from his music career until taking up recording of his debut solo project The Monotone EP during his time at Full Sail Center for the Recording Arts in Orlando, Florida.

=== 2000–2003: QN5 Music, Asterisk, Hyphen and The Monotone EP ===
QN5 was first officially founded by Tonedeff in 1997, though releases were scarce for a few years. In 2000, Tonedeff once again, and this time permanently, started up the record label QN5 Music, which became a hip-hop specialty imprint in 2001 by recruiting artists such as CunninLynguists and PackFM, and production teams which boasted the talents of hip-hop producers Domingo & Elite. In 2002, the record label The first official QN5 mixtape, Asterisk: One, was released in 2002 in order to promote the label during the Rocksteady Crew's 25th Anniversary in New York City. In 2003, the QN5 record label released a second album of the best of the artists, Asterisk: Two, and the following year Asterisk: Three was released, strengthening the respect and legitimacy of the record label and the collaborative efforts between the label mates.

The early 2000s also saw a number of Tonedeff releases and collaborations on the QN5 label. In 2001 he released Hyphen, a collection of previously recorded tracks, and the first release since The Monotone EP. The next album, Underscore (2003), featured a collection of rarities and B-sides. This album served as another primer for his official debut album, Archetype.

=== 2003–2006: Archetype and Lollapalooza ===
While Tonedeff kept the fan base satiated with consistent releases, everything was leading up to his studio album, which was delayed a few times. On November 18, 2003, Tonedeff featured on Immortal Technique's song "Peruvian Cocaine". On April 5, 2005, Tonedeff released his first official full-length album, Archetype. The long-awaited album was met with acclaim from fans and reviewers alike. HipHop DX gave Archetype an 8/10, praising Tonedeff's versatility and calling him "among the finest this genre has to offer." In a review for IGN, Jim During seconded those sentiments, concluding "With one of the best flows in hip hop, Tondeff puts out a well-rounded debut." In support of Archetype, Tonedeff embarked on international tours for the next years, including the QN5 Spring Cleaning National Tour and a Scandinavian tour in 2006, and performing at Rock The Bells among many other festivals.

Tonedeff received more national recognition when selected to perform at the August 2006 Lollapalooza festival in Chicago. He earned his nomination by garnering some of the highest vote totals throughout the "Last Band Standing" competition and finally selected as the winner after four rounds of celebrity-panel judging (which included Lollapalooza founder Perry Farrell of Jane's Addiction) and a live-performance round. Other performers at the event were Common, Kanye West, and Gnarls Barkley.

Music journalist Jon Pareles of The New York Times wrote about Tonedeff's performance at Lollapalooza, noting that Tonedeff "has so many variations of rhythm and tone that his songs are enjoyable even without a rewind button to find out what they meant."

=== 2007–2011: Solo hiatus and Cold.Killed.Collected ===
After Archetype, Tonedeff began to focus on the QN5 record label and less on his solo career. Nevertheless, he managed to maintain a countless number of collaborations and appearances with members of the QN5 roster and beyond. In 2007, Tonedeff was featured on the QN5 released Asterisk: Four, and in 2008 the EP Baby Blue for Pink. During this time he also released two instrumental compilations of beats he produced, Deffinitions Vol. 1 and 2. He also executive produced many QN5 albums, including two critically acclaimed 2010 QN5 records, I F*cking Hate Rappers by PackFM and Robots & Dinosaurs by Kokayi.

In the summer of 2011, Tonedeff began another resurgence. Similar to his release of the compilation record Underscore, Tonedeff released Cold.Killed.Collected in order to re-ignite the fan base and hype. The album included 46 total tracks, including interview snippets, some of his most popular collaborations since Archetype, unreleased tracks, and even some new material. Later that summer, Tonedeff and the rest of the QN5 record label participated in the 2011 QN5 Megashow.

=== 2011–present Polymer and Demon ===
During 2012, Tonedeff incrementally released information on his next album, Polymer. On August 17 during a Livestream Q&A with fans, Tonedeff officially revealed his plans for the new album. Polymer will be "a best-part composite" of four individually released EPs, with the final EP only being available with the fully mixed Polymer record. This unique approach to releasing his album was influenced by his desire to showcase his versatility in styles and subject matter. The first EP was announced to be titled Glutton, which was to be released in late 2012/early 2013.

Tonedeff officially released his first of four EPs that make up Polymer, titled Glutton, on February 26, 2013. The album is a very introspective look at parts of Tonedeff's own psyche. These lyrics are partnered with electronic/house/dubstep influenced beats, with production done by Tonedeff and featured production from NumberNin6 and Chew Fu. Becky Cloonan created the cover art for the album.

On December 10 of the same year, the second EP of Polymer, Demon, was released. It featured artwork by Becky Cloonan like Glutton. This 5-track EP focused on struggles with concepts like time and anxiety. According to the official description, "deals with the pressures and side-effects of anxiety, mortality and time-management over self-produced mid-tempo bounce tracks. Demon tackles an overwhelmed life a dazzling variety of tempos, flows genre-nods, such as the endurance-challenging title-track “Demon" in which Tonedeff attacks every 16th note for nearly 2 minutes straight in 6/8-time, tipping his hat at the trappings of modern Trap on "Use Me" and most notably, fans of Tonedeff's infamous triple-time flow will be delighted as Demon contains the long-awaited recorded version of "Crispy" where he essentially puts Fast Rap in a body-bag for everyone's benefit.

The third piece of Polymer, titled Hunter, was released on September 23, 2014. This EP featured the most introspective tracks to date.

A DVD documentary about the recording process of the four EPs will be released with the Polymer album.

Polymer was officially released on July 8, 2016.

== Collaborations ==
=== Extended F@mm ===
In 2002, Tonedeff joined with QN5 artists Substantial, PackFM, and Session to form Extended F@mm, which released the album Happy Fuck You Songs. The group described the album as an exercise in "conceptual posse cuts" with songs ranging from the Tetris-themed "Line Drop" to bad cell phone connections in "Celly". Happy Fuck You Songs was well received by critics, garnering positive reviews from underground sites such as Rap Reviews and Urban Smarts.

On the success of the Happy Fuck You Songs, Tonedeff made his first appearance in The Source with Extended Famm in 2003 and appeared in a commercial for Hip Hop Week on MTV. He has also been featured in magazines such as Mugshot, Rime and Scratch.

On September 24, 2012, PackFM and Tonedeff announced that Extended F@mm would be returning to the studio in 2013 for a new album. They later confirmed that all original members, including Squijee, would make at least an appearance on the new record. The album is currently being written.

=== Chico & The Man ===
One of the more long-awaited and anticipated Tonedeff projects is a joint-collaboration with the hip-hop producer Kno (of CunninLynguists) titled Chico & The Man. On this project, Kno is expected to handle the entirety of the production duties with Tonedeff to focus on the rapping portions.

The first song from the new project released to the public was "No Hope (f/ Deacon)", which was released on the QN5 Music mixtape Asterisk:Three in 2004. The solemn track is a dedication to a friend of both artists who was murdered in a store robbery in 2004 in Lexington, Kentucky. The duo released their second official song, "My Lady", on the Asterisk:Four mixtape in March 2007.

Kno has said that the album has been pushed back to spring 2010 because of his participation in the CunninLynguists United States tour in late 2009 and because of paperwork for Tonedeff. At the QN5 Megashow 2011, Tonedeff announced that the album would come out on December 13, 2011; he also previewed the first video for the project.

On November 5, 2011, Kno announced on the QN5 forum that Chico & the Man would be pushed back to an indefinite date.

On December 7, 2019, Kno released a snippet from the Built To Fade album called Life In Nostalgia on his Instagram, hinting at nothing but building hype for his upcoming Built To Fade album.

=== Peter Anthony Red ===
In 2012, Tonedeff announced his plans for his upcoming projects under the new singer-songwriter moniker Peter Anthony Red. The first song released by Peter Anthony Red was an acoustic version of "Water", a track which will be released on the full-length album.

Peter Anthony Red's first official effort, a 5-track EP The Projectionist, was released for free on Bandcamp on June 26, 2012. The release was on a new Tony Rojas label, and sister label of QN5, Quintic. This EP was released as a preview for Peter Anthony Red's first full album, entitled Hyperrealism, which is scheduled to be released on June 23, 2025.

In early 2013, Peter Anthony Red made his next appearances, except this time as a director and executive producer for two cover songs by Danish artist Fjer, and her new debut EP, A New Start.

=== Tacos and Chocolate Milk podcast ===
On March 7, 2005, Tonedeff's QN5 Music was the first hip-hop label to release its own podcast. It claims to be the first record label podcast ever, but there is some debate as to if major label Virgin beat them to the punch. The show, called WQN5, featured commentary from label artists Session, PackFM, Substantial and Tonedeff as well as guest appearances by artists like Wordsworth.

Tonedeff and PackFM began a new conversational podcast on May 4, 2012, titled Tacos & Chocolate Milk. New episodes are generally released weekly, focusing on the lives of Tonedeff and PackFM, current events, the hip-hop industry, and occasionally include special guests/friends such as Kno and Mr. Mecca. Some recurring segments include "Yo Pack!" and "Evil Tony". Support behind this endeavor grew very quickly, as Paste Magazine listed the show in their July "Ten Best Music Podcasts" article, and it was also featured in the iTunes New and Noteworthy section. As of Episode #24, the podcast has amassed over one million downloads.

== Discography ==
Albums

- Hyphen (QN5 Music/Yosumi, 2001)
- Happy Fuck You Songs (QN5 Music/Freshchest, 2002) (with Extended Famm)
- Underscore (QN5 Music/Freshchest, 2003)
- Archetype (QN5 Music/Freshchest, 2005)
- Polymer (QN5 Music, 2016)
- Hyperrealism (Quintic, 2025) (as Peter Anthony Red)
- Chico & the Man (QN5 Music, TBA) (with Kno)

EPs

- The Monotone EP (QN5 Music, 1997)
- The Projectionist (Quintic, 2012) (as Peter Anthony Red)
- Glutton (QN5 Music, 2013) (Polymer EP 1/4)
- Demon (QN5 Music, 2013) (Polymer EP 2/4)
- Hunter (QN5 Music, 2014) (Polymer EP 3/4)
- Phantom (QN5 Music, 2016) (Polymer EP 4/4)

Compilations

- Cold. Killed. Collected. (2005–2010) (QN5 Music, 2011)
- No One Cares-Ground Original 3 (2011)
- Cold. Killed. Collected.2 (2011-2022)

Singles

- "Ridiculous"
  - Released: 2000
  - Label: Tru Criminal Records
  - B-side: "Head's Up"
- "Politics"
  - Released: 2005
  - Label: QN5 Music/Freshchest
  - B-side: "Disappointed"
- "Bang"
  - Released: 2011
  - Label: QN5 Music

== Awards ==
- 2000: Braggin Rites MC Battle Champion
- 2000: Hookt (aka Da Cypha) Battle Champion
- 2001: The Source Unsigned Hype Battle Finalist
- 2006: Lollapalooza's Last Band Standing Winner
