= Noah23 discography =

- Studio albums: 28
- Extended plays: 16
- Compilation albums: 4
- Singles: 3
- Music videos: 20
- Collaboration albums: 4
- Mixtapes: 11

Noah23 is a Canadian-American underground hip hop artist from Guelph, Ontario. His discography consists of twenty-eight solo albums, four collaboration albums, sixteen EPs, eleven mixtapes, five compilations, three physical singles, and many guest appearances on other artists' tracks.

== Labels ==
Noah23's first two official albums were released through his own record label Plague Language (in 2001/2). The label went on indefinite hiatus in 2004, and since then the majority of his albums have been released on Canadian sister-label Legendary Entertainment (with a Plague Language imprint), which is owned and managed by his frequent collaborator Crunk Chris. He has also released two albums and one single with German label 2nd Rec (in 2003/4), one EP and one single with short-lived Canadian label Northstar Imprint (in 2003/4), one EP with American label Vermin Street (in 2010), and one album with American label Fake Four Inc. (in 2011). Many of his albums and mixtapes in recent years have been self-released through Bandcamp, with some of these subsequently receiving physical releases via Legendary Entertainment.

== Discography ==
In the following discography, collaboration albums are defined as full-length albums (LPs) credited to multiple vocalists. Albums credited to a vocalist/producer duo (e.g. CRUNK23 releases) are treated as solo albums. EPs, mixtapes and compilations are not differentiated on the above basis.

=== Solo albums ===
Year	Title	Notes
1999	Plague Language: Released: 1999 [re-released as Cytoplasm Pixel 2006]; Format: Cassette [CD 2006]; Label: n/a [Plague Language 2006]	14 tracks, 53 minutes. [2006 re-release]; Guest appearances by Last Laugh, Symbiots and Young Astral.; Production by Asterix Autoharp, Orphan and Warhol.; Recorded 1999.; Released on cassette in 1999 under the title Plague Language; remastered and released on CD in 2006 under the title Cytoplasm Pixel.; Several tracks that appeared on the original Plague Language cassette are omitted from the 2006 re-release, including some tracks featuring raps by Orphan.
2001	Neophyte Phenotype: Released: April 14, 2001; Format: CD (2001); Label: Plague Language (PLB001)	23 tracks, 73 minutes.; Guest appearances by Baracuda (as KGB72), Fourth Sight, Modulok (as Mofo) and Treevortex.; Production by 3 Guts, Asterisk Autoharp, Cloev, Evan Gordon, Naval Aviator, Orphan, Ricky Bionix, Toyeone and Noah23 (as Warhol).; Recorded 2000–2001.; Record label debut; first 'official' album.; Outtakes released on Tau Ceti (2002).
2002	Quicksand: Released: May 18, 2002; Format: CD (2002), LP (2003); Label: Plague Language (PLB003) 2nd Rec (2ND010)	15 tracks, 55 minutes.; Guest appearances by Baracuda and Distant Relatives (StapleMouth & Troubadour).; Production by Lovely, Naval Aviator, Ognihs, Orphan, Sseleman, Troubadour and Warhol.; Recorded 2001–2002.; First release on 2nd Rec.; Outtakes released on Tau Ceti (2002).
2002	Tau Ceti: Released: November, 2002; Format: CD-R; Label: Legendary Entertainment (Plague Language) (LE081)	15 tracks, 48 minutes.; Guest appearances by Anucongo, Aries Steve, Delusional, Hangnail, Id Obelus, Livestock, Modulok and Zoobot.; Production by Cloev, Jim Guthrie, Lovely, The Mole, Naval Aviator, Orphan, Rev. Left, Shit Blaster and Warhol.; Recorded 2000–2002.; Contains outtakes from Neophyte Phenotype (2001) and Quicksand (2002).
2004	Sigma Octantis: Released: July 27, 2004; Format: CD-R; Label: Legendary Entertainment (Plague Language) (LE093)	18 tracks, 62 minutes.; Guest appearances by DS, Fidget, Last Laugh, Livestock and Tykus.; Production by Aloeight, Evan Gordon, Ghetto Pony, Jaffa Gate, Madadam, Naval Aviator, Orphan, Rev. Left, Shit Blaster, SumOne and Warhol.; Recorded 1999–2004 (contains one track, "Fuzzy Logic", from Cytoplasm Pixel).; Contains outtakes from Jupiter Sajitarius (2004).; Released simultaneously with Mitochondrial Blues.
2004	Mitochondrial Blues: Released: July 27, 2004; Format: CD-R; Label: Legendary Entertainment (Plague Language) (LE094)	16 tracks, 57 minutes.; Guest appearances by Anucongo, Baracuda, B-One, Ceschi, Erosadis, Feelix, Hangnail, Homesick, Orko the Sykotik Alien, StapleMouth, Troubadour and Vex Bliss.; Production by Andrew H, DMS, Jaffa Gate, King Champion, Krinjah, Naught, Orphan, Sseleman and Warhol.; Recorded 2002–2004.; Contains outtakes from Jupiter Sajitarius (2004).; Released simultaneously with Sigma Octantis.
2004	Jupiter Sajitarius: Released: November 2, 2004; Format: CD, LP; Label: 2nd Rec (2ND021)	16 tracks, 60 minutes.; Guest appearances by Ceschi, Livestock and Modulok.; Production by Bishop Orange, King Champion, Madadam, Naval Aviator, Orphan, Paul Fava and Varick Pyr.; Recorded 2003–2004.; Second and final release on 2nd Rec.; Originally intended as a double album.; Outtakes released on Mitochondrial Blues (2004) and Sigma Octantis (2004).
2006	Clout: Released: June 13, 2006; Format: CD; Label: Legendary Entertainment (Plague Language) (LE122)	10 tracks, 31 minutes.; Guest appearances by Livestock, Lord Kufu and The Main.; Production by DJ Scientist, Lord Kufu, Naval Aviator, Ricky Bionix and Unconventional Science.; Recorded 2006.
2006	Technoshamanism (with Crunk Chris, as CRUNK23): Released: November 27, 2006; Format: CD; Label: Legendary Entertainment (Plague Language) (LE124)	13 tracks, 34 minutes.; Guest appearances by Livestock and Lord Kufu.; Entirely produced by Crunk Chris.; Recorded 2006.
2007	Cameo Therapy: Released: November 12, 2007; Format: CD; Label: Legendary Entertainment (Plague Language) (LE142)	12 tracks, 47 minutes.; Selected Noah23 guest appearances and collaborations (mostly previously unreleased).; Features appearances by Astronautalis, Bleubird, Brad Hamers, Ceschi, Conflikt, Exponent, Kate Schutt, Kozak, Livestock, Lord Kufu, Losaka, The Main, Optikz, Selfhelp, StapleMouth, Tykus and Vert.; Production by Evil Eye Scream, Exponent, Kate & Andrew, Losaka, Madadam, Omid, Orphan, Sapience, Scott da Ros, Selfhelp, Vert and an unspecified other (producer of track #10 "One Love").
2008	Dirty Bling (with Crunk Chris, as CRUNK23): Released: March 25, 2008; Format: CD, download; Label: Legendary Entertainment (Plague Language) (LE165)	12 tracks, 35 minutes.; Guest appearances by Kingpin Skinny Pimp and Moka Only.; Entirely produced by Crunk Chris.; Recorded 2007.; Outtakes released on Spare Ribs for the Eve of Destruction (2009).; Released simultaneously with Bourgeois Cyborgs and The Big Crunch.
2008	Rock Paper Scissors: Released: September 23, 2008; Format: CD, LP, download; Label: Legendary Entertainment (Plague Language) (LE169)	23 tracks, 71 minutes.; Guest appearances by Athena, Baracuda, Bleubird, Cadence Weapon, Ceschi, Delectable, Demune, Epic, Fidget, Gregory Pepper, Hangnail, Homesick, Jim Guthrie, Josh Martinez, K-the-I???, Livestock, The Main, Modulok, Sankofa, Sole, StapleMouth, Tykus, Wordburglar and Wormhole.; Production by Anucongo, Ceschi, Debmaster, Eclekt, Factor Chandelier, Fresh Kils, Gregory Pepper, Jim Guthrie, Lord Kufu, Madadam, Mr Soch, Naval Aviator, Playpad Circus, Riff Raff, The Sad Clowns, Small Is Beautiful, Subtitle, Thur Deephrey and Zoën.; Recorded 2007–2008.; Outtakes released on Upside Down Bluejay (2008).
2008	Upside Down Bluejay: Released: November 23, 2008; Format: Download (2008), CDr (2009); Label: Legendary Entertainment (Plague Language) (LE194)	23 tracks, 69 minutes.; Guest appearances by Bleubird, Gregory Pepper, Livestock, Lord Kufu, The Main, Optikz, Sharky and T-Dot.; Production by Chukchee, Classified, DJ Moves, Dreamcode, En2ak, Gregory Pepper, K-the-I???, Leon Murphy, Lmnz, Lord Kufu, Madadam, Playpad Circus, Mr Soch, Savilion, Smear, Subtitle and Unconventional Science.; Recorded 2004–2008.; Contains outtakes from Rock Paper Scissors (2008).
2009	Crab Nebula (with Madadam): Released: March 25, 2009; Format: Download; Label: Plague Language / 2nd Rec (unreleased)	14 tracks, 37 minutes.; Entirely produced by Madadam.; Recorded 2006.; The album was recorded in 2006 and scheduled to be released in 2007 on 2nd Rec. It was to be Noah23's third release on the label after the 2003 re-release of Quicksand and 2004's Jupiter Sajitarius. However, the record label went on "indefinite hiatus" in 2007 and the album was not released until 2009, when it was offered as a free download (though it had leaked sometime prior to this).
2009	Spare Ribs for the Eve of Destruction (with Crunk Chris, as CRUNK23): Released: September 22, 2009; Format: CD, download; Label: Legendary Entertainment (Plague Language) (LE210)	13 tracks, 35 minutes.; Guest appearance by The Main.; Entirely produced by Crunk Chris.; Recorded 2007.; Recorded "after Technoshamanism and right before and during the creation of Dirty Bling."; Contains outtakes from Dirty Bling (2008).; Released simultaneously with Feature Presentation.
2011	Fry Cook on Venus: Released: March 29, 2011; Format: CD, LP, download; Label: Fake Four Inc. (FFINC024)	14 tracks, 45 minutes.; Guest appearances by Awol One, Ceschi, Ghettosocks, Gregory Pepper, Liz Powell, Myka 9, Rickolus and Sole.; Production by Cars & Trains, Ceschi, Factor Chandelier, Gregory Pepper, Madadam, Oskar Ohlson, Rickolus, Skyrider and Zoën.; Recorded 2010.; Outtakes released on Vision and Voice (2011).
2011	Super Yukes 5000 (as Yukon Dawn): Released: May 17, 2011; Format: Download; Label: Plague Language	30 tracks, 71 minutes.; Post-folk album released under the Yukon Dawn moniker.; Contains material dating back to the 1990s and through the 2000s.
2011	Vision and Voice: Released: June 23, 2011; Format: CD, download; Label: Legendary Entertainment (Plague Language) (LE259)	17 tracks, 43 minutes.; Guest appearances by Cadalack Ron, StapleMouth and Wormhole.; Production by Ardamus, Brandon Logic, DJ Snatchatec, Dreamcode, Elaquent, Erco, Falside, Kid-80, Krinjah, Lord Kufu, Mr Soch, Oskar Ohlson, Playpad Circus, Taco Neck, Unknown Local and Zoën.; Recorded 2006–2010.; Contains outtakes from Fry Cook on Venus (2011).
2011	Illegal Ideas Inc. (with Crunk Chris, as CRUNK23): Released: November 11, 2011; Format: CD, download; Label: Legendary Entertainment (Plague Language) (LE249)	14 tracks, 38 minutes.; Guest appearance by Conspiracy.; Entirely produced by Crunk Chris.; Recorded 2011.
2012	Wingfoot: Released: December 21, 2012; Format: CD, download; Label: Plague Language	17 tracks, 53 minutes.; Production by B.illing, DS, Froze, Greencarpetedstairs, K-the-I???, Kydd, Motëm, Nem270, Stratosbeats, Party Trash, Sicksteen and Sir Pressure.; Recorded 2012.; First release of original material following 2012 hiatus.
2013	Lotus Deities: Released: May 23, 2013; Format: CD, download; Label: Plague Language	13 tracks, 38 minutes.; Guest appearances by Blam Lord, Dot Cult, Left Leberra, Pepperboy, Shady Blaze, Spz Chaote, Yung Yadi and Zach G.; Production by Blown, Dreamcode, Dynamo414, Fingersnap Dee, Greencarpetedstairs, HunkE, Micron Diamond, Motëm, Party Trash, SHMX & Do$age, Toy Trains, Yawning Boy and Zach G.; Recorded 2013.
2013	Occult Trill III: Blast Master Therion: Released: August 20, 2013; Format: CD, download; Label: Plague Language	16 tracks, 61 minutes.; Production by Bids & SHMX, Blvckhxvrt, Chukchee, Dreamcode, Eyes & Teeth, Froze, Horse Head, King Champion, Motëm, Party Trash, Severus Sin, Spz Chaote, Strange Powers and Yawning Boy.; Recorded 2013.; Third entry in the Occult Trill series. While the first two entries in the series are considered mixtapes, this release is considered an "official album".; Track 16, "Bone Yard", features a two-minute Noah23 verse over the beginning of the song "The Donor" by 1970s folk rock artist Judee Sill (the remainder of the nearly eight-minute song plays unaltered).
2014	Light Years (with David Klopek): Released: July 23, 2014; Format: Download; Label: Plague Language	15 tracks, 39 minutes.; Entirely produced by David Klopek.; Recorded 2013–2014.
2014	Street Astrology: Released: August 23, 2014; Format: Download; Label: Plague Language	23 tracks, 65 minutes.; Guest appearances by Deli Mane, DS, Lil Shark, Shady Blaze, Skweeezy C, Sortahuman, Spz Chaote, Swag Toof, Trippy tha Kid and Zachg.; Production by Blxckhxvrt, Golie C, Gungho, JoeyBagadoughnuts, Lederrick, Lofty305, Necedah, Nedarb Nagrom, Nem270, Smear One, Spz Chaote, Vic NS, Yawning Boy and Zachg.; Recorded 2014.
2015	Noah23 x Blown (with Blown): Released: January 23, 2015; Format: Download; Label: Candy Drips	16 tracks, 40 minutes.; Guest appearances by Blam Lord, Bran tha Don, Deli Mane, Dewey Decibel, Miles Farewell, Skweeezy C, Sortahuman, Spz Chaote, Triniti and Trippy tha Kid.; Entirely produced by Blown (Froze & Party Trash).; Recorded 2014.
2015	Peacock Angel: Released: May 23, 2015; Format: Download; Label: Plague Language	33 tracks, 103 minutes.; Double album; Guest appearances by Baracuda, Daimon Miles, Dizzy D, DotCult, Dylan Ross, Less, Lxor, Mackned, Main Attrakionz, NoEmotion GoldMask, Nxmx Gxldxx, Pepperboy, Shady Blaze, Skweezy C, Spz Chaote, Stash Marina, $uicide Boy$, Supa Sortahuman, Swag Toof, Triniti, Trippy tha Kid, Wicca Phase Springs Eternal, YungJZAisDead and Yung Xela.; Production by 88 Ultra, Bender, Blvckhxvrt, Calis, Debars, DJ Coutz, Elaquent, Fresh Kils, Froze, Jamerson, Keyboard Kid, Khalil Nova, Khrist Koopa, Lederrick, Max Daddy, Morbidly-O-Beats, Motëm, Mystic Phonk, Nattymari, Noblonski, Nok from the Future, Pictureplane, Raised by Wolves, Rellim, SHMX, Slava Mane, Spz Chaote, That's Creep, Wavve Gawd, Yawning Boy (as Yawns), Yvng Bvck and Yung Jza.; Recorded 2014–2015.
2015	Aquarian Alien: Released: November 13, 2015; Format: Download; Label: Plague Language	16 tracks, 38 minutes.; Production by AJ Suede, Dreamcode, Fingersnap Dee, Lederrick, Mr. Reds, S.A.T. Beats, SHMX, Spz Chaote, Sseleman, Steel Tipped Dove, Vic NS, DJ Wardove, Wavve Gawd and Yvng Bvck.; Recorded October–November 2015.
2016	Oracle: Released: February 10, 2016; Format: Download; Label: Plague Language	11 tracks, 33 minutes.; Guest appearance by AJ Suede.; Production by 90s Bambino, DJ Coutz, Falco, Gamera, Kufura 浪人, Marvin Cruz, Mystic Phonk, S.A.T. Beats, Skin x Bones, Spz Chaote and Yawning Boy (as Yawns).; Recorded December 2015–February 2016.
2016	Discordian Pope (with DJ Coutz): Released: August 17, 2016; Format: Download; Label: Plague Language	23 tracks, 59 minutes.; Guest appearances by Bender, Motëm, Supa Sortahuman and Tes Uno.; Entirely produced by DJ Coutz.; Recorded July–August 2016.
2016	Year of the Monkey (with Crunk Chris, as CRUNK23): Released: November 11, 2016; Format: Download, CD; Label: Legendary Entertainment	11 tracks, 23 minutes.; Entirely produced by Crunk Chris.; Recorded October 2015–August 2016.
2016	Parts Unknown: Released: December 3, 2016; Format: Download; Label: Plague Language	13 tracks, 39 minutes.; Guest appearances by Kemet Dank, Spz Chaote, and unspecified others.; Production by DJ Coutz, Fezz Stanton, Gamera, Khalil Nova, Thur Deephrey, Waavegawd, and unspecified others.; Recorded ?–November 2016.
2023	Ikosi Tria: Released: February 3, 2023; Format: Vinyl, CD, cassette, download; Label: Plague Language / El Gran E	23 tracks, 57 minutes.; Guest appearances by DJ Lucas, Slug Christ, SpiceGurlPurp, KirbLaGoop, Killah Priest, and TrippyThaKid.; Production by Pasquale, Noah23, Nedarb, Only Osiriz, Fresh Kils, Cloudk!sser, Kufusan, Shoop, TruondaBeat, Jam, Rota, GLDN CHLD, Keyboard Kid, Pentagrvm, Rove, Stupiboy, Selcouth, and EmptyBrother7.; Recorded February 2021–February 2022.

=== Collaboration albums ===
- Collaboration albums are defined as full-length albums (LPs) credited to multiple vocalists. Albums credited to a vocalist/producer duo (e.g. CRUNK23 releases) are treated as solo albums.

Year	Title	Notes
2004	The Train Rawbers (with Homesick & Livestock, as The Train Rawbers): Released: Fall 2004; Format: CD-R; Label: Legendary Entertainment (Plague Language) (LE126)	13 tracks, 51 minutes.; Vocals by Noah23, Homesick and Livestock.; Guest appearances by Hangnail, K-the-I???, Quan-Ra and Tykus.; Production by Lord Kufu, Madadam, Naval Aviator, Orphan and Rev. Left.; Recorded 2003–2004.; Credited to Livestock, Homesick & Noah23, as The Train Rawbers, but primarily "Livestock's brainchild, featuring [Noah23] and Homesick".; Livestock features on eleven of the thirteen tracks (all except "Introduct" and "Indeed"), while Noah23 features on six (3, 4, 6, 8, 9 & 13), and Homesick features on only four (3, 5, 8 & 13). Only three of the tracks feature all three members ("Ninjah Pizza", "Eagle" & "Vacuum Oyster Surprise").; "Originally compiled and mixed-down by Livestock on the spring equinox of 2004. Mastered in the fall of 2004 in Boston by nameless friends."; The album was initially released with the subtitle "Volume 1", though no further volumes of material were released.
2004	Farewell Archetypes (with Plague Language): Released: November 12, 2004; Format: LP, CD; Label: Plague Language/Legendary Entertainment (PLLE001) / Subversiv Rec	Noah23 appears on two tracks: "Soylent Brown" and "Tokyo Strings".; Features appearances by Aloeight, Ceschi, David Ramos, Demune, Desolate, Distant Relatives (StapleMouth & Troubadour), Helix, Intercomm, John Tsunam, Kaeoflux, K-the-I???, Lumin, Mic King, Of Proliteariots (John Tsunam, Nocturne, StapleMouth & Whimbly Smallfry), Orphan, Penny, Shoshin, StapleMouth, Troubadour, Unauthordox and Whimbly Smallfry.; Production by Aloeight, Desolate, Helix, Intercomm, Kaeoflux, Orphan, Paul Fava, Shoshin, Troubadour and Wilocke.; The album was first released as two volumes of limited edition vinyl on the label Subversiv Rec (in late 2003 and early 2004). The full album was released on CD on Plague Language/Legendary Entertainment in 2004. The CD edition substitutes one Demune track, "Find Yourself", with another, "Precious", and omits Athena's "I Alone (Remix)" (all three of these tracks were produced by Orphan).
2008	Bourgeois Cyborgs (with Baracuda, as Bourgeois Cyborgs): Released: March 25, 2008; Format: CD, download; Label: Legendary Entertainment (Plague Language) (LE143)	12 tracks, 38 minutes.; Vocals by Noah23 and Baracuda.; Guest appearance by The Main.; Production by Cloev, Jacob Cino, Lord Kufu, Madadam and Vincent Price.; Recorded 2002–2007.; Noah23 and Baracuda first began working together under the name Bourgeois Cyborgs in 2002. The duo broke up in 2012 and Baracuda is no longer affiliated with Plague Language.; Released simultaneously with The Big Crunch and Dirty Bling.
2008	The Big Crunch (with Livestock & Madadam, as The Weird Apples): Released: March 25, 2008; Format: CD, download; Label: Legendary Entertainment (Plague Language) (LE144)	14 tracks, 38 minutes.; Vocals by Noah23 and Livestock.; Guest appearances by Baracuda and Hangnail.; Entirely produced by Madadam.; Recorded 2006.; Released simultaneously with Bourgeois Cyborgs and Dirty Bling.
2009	Feature Presentation (with DS, as Famous Playaz): Released: September 22, 2009; Format: CD, download; Label: Legendary Entertainment (Plague Language) (LE205)	11 tracks, 39 minutes.; Vocals by Noah23 and DS.; Released simultaneously with Spare Ribs for the Eve of Destruction.; Entirely produced by DS.; Recorded 2008–2009.

=== EPs ===
Year	Title	Notes
2004	Ancient Israelites Older Than Anorthosite (with Jaffa Gate): Released: March 1, 2004; Format: CD-R; Label: Northstar Imprint (NSS-2)	4 tracks, 16 minutes.; Entirely produced by Jaffa Gate.; Recorded 2003.; The EP was preceded by the 2003 release of a 7" single, featuring two exclusive tracks: "Paper Cranes" and "No Such Thing as Twins".
2006	Amalthea Magnetosphere: Released: May 17, 2006; Format: CD-R; Label: Legendary Entertainment (Plague Language) (LE123)	6 tracks, 20 minutes.; Guest appearance by Treevortex.; Production by Jacob Cino, Ldiles, Madadam, PaidJah, Treevortex and Warhol.; Recorded 2003–2004 (except for the intro, produced for this project in 2005–2006).; Made up of leftovers from Jupiter Sajitarius and conceived as a companion EP to that album; named after one of the moons of Jupiter.
2007	Funny Money (with DS, as Famous Playaz): Released: February 27, 2007; Format: CD; Label: Legendary Entertainment (Plague Language) (LE127)	7 tracks, 27 minutes.; Vocals by Noah23 and DS.; Produced by DS.; Recorded 2006 (except "Viper Centipede Blizzard", which originally appeared on Sigma Octantis in 2004).; Famous Playaz debut release.
2007	The Fool (with Lord Kufu): Released: March 12, 2007; Format: CD; Label: Legendary Entertainment (Plague Language) (LE128)	8 tracks, 21 minutes.; Entirely produced by Lord Kufu.; Recorded 2006.; The lyrics on "Grassy Knoll" and "14 Carrots" are adapted from the writings of Robert Anton Wilson.
2010	Vermin vs Noah23 EP (with Vinyl Blight): Released: May 26, 2010; Format: Download; Label: Vermin Street	6 tracks, 22 minutes.; Six remixes of the Noah23 track "Blackstone" by Vermin Street Media artists.
2010	Noah23 / Playpad Circus (with Playpad Circus): Released: June 4, 2010; Format: CD, download; Label: Plague Language / Legendary Entertainment (LE219)	8 tracks, 27 minutes.; Guest appearances by Baracuda, Livestock and The Main.; Entirely produced by Playpad Circus.; Recorded 2009–2010.; Preliminarily titled "Vision & Voice"
2010	Heart of Rock: Released: September 29, 2010; Format: CD-R, download; Label: Plague Language / Legendary Entertainment (LE240)	7 tracks, 20 minutes.; Guest appearances by Baracuda, Bender, D-Sisive, Icon the Mic King and Mac Lethal.; Production by Blee, Buck 65, Erco, Lord Kufu, Mike Gao, Sicksteen and Zoën.; Recorded 2010.; Classic rock themed EP.
2011	The Terminal Illness EP (with Krem): Released: September 7, 2011; Format: Download; Label: Plague Language / Arcadiac Records	7 tracks, 23 minutes.; Guest appearances by Baracuda, Bleubird, Robust and Sole.; Entirely produced by Krem (aka DroneJones).; Recorded 2010–2011.
2011	Zoom: Released: December 20, 2011; Format: Download / CD (Legendary Entertainment, March 2013); Label: Plague Language	9 tracks, 29 minutes.; Production by Dreamcode, JoeyBagaDohNutz, Kydd, Sseleman, Warhol and others (unspecified).; Recorded 2011.; Final release prior to 2012 hiatus.
2013	Tropical Fruit: Released: February 10, 2013; Format: Download; Label: Plague Language	5 tracks, 17 minutes.; Production by David Klopek, Ephelant, Froze, Pictureplane and Toy Trains.; Recorded 2012–2013.; A video for the eponymous lead single, produced by Pictureplane, was released on January 28 and was directed by Live Action Fezz.
2013	Husk (as Yukon Dawn): Released: September 3, 2013; Format: Download; Label: Plague Language	5 tracks, 11 minutes.; Recorded 2012–2013.; Alternative folk EP.; Released under the Yukon Dawn moniker.; Dedicated to Noah23's mother for her sixtieth birthday.
2014	Delicate Genius (with Horse Head): Released: January 31, 2014; Format: Download; Label: Plague Language	7 tracks, 21 minutes.; Entirely produced by Horse Head.; Recorded 2013–2014.
2014	Blood (with Party Trash): Released: October 31, 2014; Format: Download; Label: Candy Drips	3 tracks, 6 minutes.; Entirely produced by Party Trash.; Recorded 2014.
2015	Three B4 Fifteen (with DJ Wardove): Released: May 13, 2015; Format: Download; Label:	4 tracks, 18 minutes.; Entirely produced by DJ Wardove.
2015	Traveling Songs (with All Things Invisible, as Weird Waters): Released: July 18, 2015; Format: Download; Label: Plague Language	6 tracks, 16 minutes.; Alternative folk EP.; Recorded June 2015.
2015	Forlorn & Crestfallen (as Yukon Dawn): Released: November 23, 2015; Format: Download; Label: Plague Language	5 tracks, 9 minutes.; Alternative folk EP.; Recorded November 2015.
2016	Unicorn EP (with S.A.T. Beats): Released: June 23, 2016; Format: Download; Label: Plague Language	5 tracks, 19 minutes.; Entirely produced by S.A.T. Beats.; Dream pop EP.
2016	War23 Mix (with DJ Wardove): Released: July 14, 2016; Format: Download; Label:	3 tracks, 9 minutes.; Entirely produced by DJ Wardove.
2016	Alchemical Crow: Released: September 13, 2016; Format: Download; Label: Plague Language	8 tracks, 24 minutes.; Guest appearances by Supa Sortahuman and Trippy tha Kid.; Production by Bliiit, Debars, Krinjah, SHMX, Wavvegawd and Yung JZA.

=== Mixtapes ===
- Mixtapes are defined as albums featuring production predominantly taken from the work of other musical acts.

Year	Title	Notes
2009	The Unmixtape: Released: March 25, 2009; Format: Download; Label: Plague Language	20 tracks, 33 minutes.; All vocals either freestyled or 'frozen freestyled' (spontaneously memorized; composed and memorized 'on the spot' without written record).; Recorded over one day in Summer 2008.
2009	Instant Classic (with Plague Language Fam): Released: August 12, 2009; Format: Download; Label: Plague Language	21 tracks, 44 minutes.; Features new vocals by Plague Language artists over instrumentals by classic rock acts AC/DC, The Band, Creedence Clearwater Revival, The Doors, Fleetwood Mac, Joan Jett, Journey, Neil Young, Rush, Santana, Supertramp, Van Morrison, and others.; Plague Language Fam is the informal name for an extended group of affiliates around the core Plague Language crew. The core crew at the time of this mixtape's production consisted of Noah23, Baracuda, Livestock, The Main, Lord Kufu, DS and Madadam. Affiliates appearing on this mixtape include Bermuda Shells, Carlito, Dr Zeus, Feelix, Fidgit, Koko Bonaparte, Lokust, Modulok, Red Sonja Bear, SlowBe and Tykus.; The mixtape is framed ironically as a late-night radio programme presented by DJ Sweet Daddy Yukes (a Wolfman Jack parody performed by Noah23).
2010	Based Sky Black Death: Blue Lunar Night: Released: December 12, 2010; Format: Download; Label: Plague Language	13 tracks, 43 minutes.; Features new vocals by Noah23 over instrumentals by Blue Sky Black Death.; All vocals either freestyled or 'frozen freestyled'.; The first part of the mixtape's title is derived from the use of Blue Sky Black Death beats, along with general inspiration drawn from Lil B the Based God. The second part of the title is a reference to the idea, based on contemporary study of the Mayan calendar, that a significant mystical event was to occur in 2011 on February 10, which is Noah23's date of birth.
2010	Noah23 vs Wu-Tang: Enter the 23rd Chamber: Released: December 21, 2010; Format: Download; Label: Plague Language	23 tracks, 59 minutes.; Features new vocals by Noah23 over instrumentals by Rza and Wu-Tang Clan.; All vocals either freestyled or 'frozen freestyled'.
2011	Prefuse 23: Released: February 19, 2011; Format: Download; Label: Plague Language	17 tracks, 56 minutes.; Features new vocals by Noah23 over instrumentals by Prefuse 73.; All vocals either freestyled or 'frozen freestyled'.
2011	Gimme Indie Rock: Released: April 22, 2011; Format: Download; Label: Plague Language	13 tracks, 42 minutes.; Features new vocals by Noah23 over instrumentals by indie rock acts Blonde Redhead, Cat Power, The Flaming Lips, Frusciante, Grizzly Bear, Joanna Newsom, The Mars Volta, MGMT, Modest Mouse, Pavement and Sebadoh.
2011	Lamp of Invisible Light: Released: May 23, 2011; Format: Download; Label: Plague Language	10 tracks, 28 minutes.; Features a mixture of original production and new vocals by Noah23 over instrumentals by Clipse, Janelle Monáe, Pictureplane, Runaways, and others (unspecified).; Original production by Mr Soch, and others (unspecified).
2011	Noah23 Meets Company Flow: 23 from the Hospital: Released: July 1, 2011; Format: Download; Label: Plague Language	16 tracks, 40 minutes.; Features new vocals by Noah23 over instrumentals by Company Flow.; All vocals either freestyled or 'frozen freestyled'.; The title is a play on Company Flow's 1999 instrumental album Little Johnny from the Hospitul.
2011	Occult Trill: The Witch-Tape: Released: August 13, 2011; Format: Download; Label: Plague Language	15 tracks, 55 minutes.; Features new vocals by Noah23 over instrumentals by witch house and alternative hip hop acts Balam Acab, Blue Sky Black Death, Clams Casino, Grill Grill, Grimes, Horse MacGyver, Light Asylum, oOoOO, Pictureplane, Ritualz, Salem and White Ring.
2011	Occult Trill II: The Sun Rewinds: Released: October 28, 2011; Format: Download; Label: Plague Language	23 tracks, 82 minutes.; Features a mixture of original production by recent and long-time Noah23 collaborators and new vocals by Noah23 over instrumentals by witch house and alternative hip hop acts Alonzo Wang (TheNothing666), Lil B (& Beat Flippaz), Mellow Grave, oOoOO, Pictureplane, Polow, Salem, Ski, Veins (~▲†▲~), Whyt Noiz and Wikan.; Guest appearances by Baracuda, Blam Lord, Sortahuman, Supa and Spz Chaote, Original production by Crunk Chris, Dreamcode, Forest Travesty, Lord Kufu, Motëm, Neptunes Mimic, Party Trash and Zoën.
2013	Ween x Noah23 (Browntape): Released: October 9, 2013; Format: Download; Label: Plague Language	10 tracks, 21 minutes.; Features new vocals by Noah23 over instrumentals by Ween.

=== Compilation albums ===
- Compilation albums are defined as albums composed predominantly of previously released material.

Year	Title	Notes
2009	Plague Language Compilation (with Plague Language): Released: August 21, 2009; Format: CD, download; Label: Plague Language	14 tracks, 44 minutes.; Noah23 appears on 9 tracks.; Features a guest appearance by Wormhole.; Features production by Gregory Pepper, Ldiles, Leon Murphy (Greysol), Lord Kufu, Madadam and Orphan.; Album art by Gregory Pepper.
2011	Pirate Utopias (77 Lost Scrolls): Released: June 25, 2011; Format: Download; Label: Plague Language	77 tracks, 224 minutes.; Features guest appearances by Ange de Costa, Baracuda, Big Horse, Big Ref, Big Vish, Bleubird, D-Bo, Dewey Decibel (Emcee Unless), DS, Duncan Jewett, Fannie, Homesick, Johnny Riddim, Koko Bonaparte, Kontra & Stuka, K-the-I???, Livestock, Lord Kufu, Mad Logic, The Main, Mascaria, Meiso, Mexichron, Moka Only, Myf, Naval Aviator, Optikz, Raw Bleezy, Sharky, Sicksteen, Sister Fa, Splynter, StapleMouth, Tanasa Ras, Tykus and Wormhole.; Features production by Blee, Cash Gordon, Chukchee, The Dirty Sample, The D'Urbervilles, En2ak, Factor Chandelier, Ghetto Pony, Krinjah, Leon Murphy, LMNZ, Madadam, Mascaria, Mr Soch, Orphan, Playpad Circus, Sapience, Sicksteen, Small Is Beautiful, Vangel, Warhol, Zoën and unspecified others.; Also features music by The Beach Boys, Blue Sky Black Death, J Dilla, John Prine, The Neptunes and unspecified others.; A "lost tapes style" album, consisting of rarities, collected guest appearances, remixes, freestyles and other miscellanea.; Announced via Twitter and 'leaked' via Soulseek.; Oldest tracks are from 2004, but the majority of the content is from 2008 to 2011.
2012	Noah23 for Dummies: Released: February 24, 2012; Format: Download; Label: Plague Language	23 tracks, 71 minutes.; Features guest appearances by Baracuda, Gregory Pepper and Livestock.; Features production by Arsenic, Blown (Froze & Party Trash), Buck 65, Elaquent, Factor Chandelier, JoeyBagaDoughnuts, Jostereo, Krem, Madadam, Mr Soch, Nothing666, Le Parasite, Playpad Circus, Sixo, Sseleman, Vangel and Zoën.; Also features music by The Flaming Lips and Salem.; Released via Sendspace.; Intended as an introductory mix for new listeners, focusing primarily on newer material (the oldest track, "Nebula", was recorded in 2006).
2014	Rare Gems: Released: February 23, 2014; Format: Download; Label: Plague Language	23 tracks, 76 minutes.; Features appearances by Bolo Nef, CrashDDZ, Deli Mane, DotCult, Dynamo-P, Krista Muir, K-Ta, Jesse Dangerously, MaxSevenEight, Molly Gruesome, Nimrod, Rafał Łuc, Shady Blaze, Spz Chaote, StapleMouth, Swag Toof and Wormhole.; Features production by Aloeight, Blown (Froze & Party Trash), Chryso, Deft Aphid, Dior Sentai, Factor Chandelier, Fingersnap Dee, Froze, Miles Farewell (Toy Trains), MMAC, Party Trash, Rezult, RK Beatmaker, Shady Blaze, That's Creep, Thur Deephrey, Tristan and Yawning Boy (of DotCult).; Also features music by Lil B.; A compilation of selected Noah23 guest appearances "from the past few years".
2015	Illuminati Christmas: Released: December 4, 2015; Format: Download; Label: Plague Language	10 tracks, 24 minutes.; A compilation of selected Christmas-themed Noah23 tracks.
2017	Hope Knot (with DJ Wardove): Released: March 23, 2017; Format: Download; Label: Plague Language	11 tracks, 35 minutes.; Entirely produced by DJ Wardove.; A compilation of all the Noah23 tracks produced by DJ Wardove.
2017	Supa23 (with Supa Sortahuman): Released: December 13, 2017; Format: Download; Label: Plague Language	12 tracks, 46 minutes.; A compilation of collaborative tracks by Noah23 and Supa Sortahuman.
2021	Pirate Utopias 3000: Released: January 22, 2021; Format: Download; Label: Plague Language	77 tracks, 207 minutes.; A compilation of obscure and miscellaneous Noah23 tracks from the period 2005—2015.

=== Singles ===
- A list of singles that received physical releases.

Year	Title	Notes
2002	"Crypto Sporidian / Deadly Rays" (with Baracuda): Released: May, 2002; Format: 12" vinyl; Label: Plague Language (PLB002)	Split single.; Tracks taken from the 2002 albums Quicksand and Tetragammoth.
2003	"Paper Cranes / No Such Thing as Twins" (with Jaffa Gate): Released: May 17, 2003; Format: 7" vinyl; Label: Northstar Imprint (NSS-1)	Companion single to the EP Ancient Israelites Older Than Anorthosite (2004).
2004	"Chicken Pox": Released: September 27, 2004; Format: 12" vinyl; Label: 2nd Rec (2ND018)	A-side taken from the 2004 album Jupiter Sajitarius (see album page for single track listing).; B-side "Sigma Octantis" subsequently appeared on Upside Down Bluejay (2008).; A-side remix "Chicken Soup" (featuring Ceschi) subsequently appeared on Cameo Therapy (2007).

== Guest appearances ==
- The below is an incomplete list of Noah23 guest appearances on releases by other artists.

2001

- Id Obelus - "They Call Me" from Talking to Machines (2001)

2002

- Baracuda - "Deadly Rays", "Dental Plan" & "Duplicate Version" from Tetragammoth (2002)
- The Twin Sisters - "A Bike a Horse a Tree" from Amulet (2002)
- Penny - "Antique Couplings" from The Clockforth Movement (2002)

2003

- Id Obelus - "They Call Me" from There's Blood in the Ashtray (2003)

2004

- Feelix - "Homewood" from Critical Focus (2004) (track also appears on Mitochondrial Blues (2004))
- Livestock - "Coconut Bomb" from Spiral Like the 9 (2004) (track also appears on Sigma Octantis (2004) as an untitled bonus track and on Pirate Utopias (77 Lost Scrolls) (2011))

2005

- Homesick - "Shell Shock Rock" from Tangent Wars (2005)
- Optikz - "Gods of Thunder" from Area Fifty One Nine Cover Ups (2005)
- Scott da Ros - "They Made Me Do It" from "They Made Me Do It" [single] (2005) (track also appears on Cameo Therapy (2007))

2006

- Vert - "Yrs" from Some Beans & an Octopus (2006) (track also appears on Cameo Therapy (2007))

2007

- Livestock - "Isis Hathor" from The Afterlife of Jazz (2007) (track also appears on Pirate Utopias (77 Lost Scrolls) (2011))
- Livestock & Leon Murphy - "Anarcho-Taoists" from The Rawganic EP (2007) (track also appears on Upside Down Bluejay (2008))

2008

- Baracuda - "Off the Hook" from Knucklebone (2008) (track also appears on Pirate Utopias (77 Lost Scrolls) (2011))
- Bleubird - "Ripe Figs Remix" from Street Talk 2 (2008) (track also appears on Upside Down Bluejay (2008))
- Factor Chandelier - "Electric Furs of a Lynx" from Chandelier (2008) (track also appears on Pirate Utopias (77 Lost Scrolls) (2011))
- Id Obelus - "The Amplification of Amputation" from The Inevitable Crushing (2008) (track also appears on Pirate Utopias (77 Lost Scrolls) (2011))
- Josh Martinez & DJ Zone - "Moonlanding" from The World Famous Sex Buffet: Mixed Tape CD (2008) (track also appears on Rock Paper Scissors (2008))
- The Main - "Roach and the Beetle" & "Rosey Rockbottom" from The Glass Slipper (2008) ("Rosey Rockbottom" also appears on Plague Language Compilation (2009))
- Normal Oranges - "Last Great Fix" from $5 Mic (2008)
- Scott da Ros - "Mega Posse Cut: Fuck You, We Don't Need You" (2008)
- Smear One - "Help" from Airies Rising (2008) (track also appears on Upside Down Bluejay (2008))

2009

- 1111 - "Today's Society" from I Want to Be a Janitor's Child (2009)
- Blee - "True Cat" from Solution (2009) (track also appears on Pirate Utopias (77 Lost Scrolls) (2011))
- Bleubird - "Ripe Figs Remix Remix" from Street Talk 5 (2009)
- The Motherboard - "Motherload" from "Motherload" [single] (2009)
- StapleMouth - "Dead End Game" from Ruler of Desperate Measures (2009) (track also appears on Rock Paper Scissors (2008))
- StapleMouth - "10 Kings (Mega Tuff)", "Micron Helium Balloons" & "Trilateral Damage" from Un-Everything Except Three (2009) ("Micron Helium Balloons" also appears on Cameo Therapy (2007); an abridged version of "Trilateral Damage" appears on Mitochondrial Blues (2004); "10 Kings (Mega Tuff)" & "Trilateral Damage" are alternate versions of the same song)

2010

- All Things Invisible - "King of the End Times" from Gas & Dust (2010)
- Blee - "Writing a Book" from Cosmos Road (2010) (track also appears on Pirate Utopias (77 Lost Scrolls) (2011))
- Factor - "Periodic Table" from Old Souls Vol. 2 (2010)
- Factor - "Sacrifice" from 13 Stories (2010) (track also appears on Pirate Utopias (77 Lost Scrolls) (2011))
- Livestock - "Nazca Plateau" & "Raw Nukes" from For My Man Sittin' on a Boat (2010) (tracks also appear on Clout (2006) and Rock Paper Scissors (2008) respectively)
- The Notorious BEN - "I Comes 1st" from Interdimensional Surfboard (2010)
- Wormhole - "When (Twilight Minotaur Remix)" from Ouroboros (2010)
- Wormhole & Sapience - "Fortune Cookie" from The Mo'o (2010) (track also appears on Pirate Utopias (77 Lost Scrolls) (2011))
- Zoën - "Magistrate" from One Night Between (2010) (track also appears on Pirate Utopias (77 Lost Scrolls) (2011))

2011

- Blown - "Jordan" from Slam Dunk Contest Vol. 1 (2011)
- C. Banks - "The Come-Up" (2011) (track also appears on Pirate Utopias (77 Lost Scrolls) (2011))
- D.O.H. the Joker - "Bludgeon" from The Quickening (2011)
- En2ak - "Intolerable Kid" & "Smoke" from Celestial Toyroom (2011) (tracks also appear on Pirate Utopias (77 Lost Scrolls) (2011) and Upside Down Bluejay (2008) respectively)
- Factor - "High" from Club Soda Series 1 (2011) (track also appears on Rare Gems (2014))
- Hobs Sputnik - "The End" from Satellite Strange (2011)
- Lost Planet - "Crazy Thoughts" from Lost Planet (2011)
- The Main - "Flowers of Evil", "The Fishin' Song" & "Alabama Tick" from Clamnesia (2011)
- Murk-a-Troid - "Red Panties (It's Over)" from Heavens to Murk-a-Troid (2011) (track also appears on Rare Gems (2014))
- Nomar Slevik - "Northern Trajectory" from In the Field Where I Died (2011)
- Sole and the Skyrider Band - "We Will Not Be Moved" from Hello Cruel World (2011)

2012

- Chryso - "Flow" from Demons Run (2012) (track also appears on Rare Gems (2014))
- Jesse Dangerously - "Slept Through a Landslide" from "Slept Through a Landslide (Tired Angels Remix)" [single] (2012) (track also appears on Rare Gems (2014))
- Th' Mole & Friends - "Bloody Peaches (Romanticore)" from Love in the Chaosphere (2012)
- Ovate & StapleMouth - "Pazuzu Coil" from The Ogre Ephemeris (2012) (an abridged version of this track appears on Rare Gems (2014))
- Playpad Circus - "Sculpting Supernova" from Phantasma (2012)
- Shady Blaze - "Another Dimension" from The Grind, Hustle & Talent (2012) (track also appears on Rare Gems (2014))
- Sixo - "Daggers" from Tracking Perception EP (2012) (track also appears on Noah23 for Dummies (2012))
- Spz Chaote - "Stuntin' Like Jupiter" from The Voice of an Era (2012)
- Supa - "Mellow" from Weird Is the New Cool (2012) (track also appears on Rare Gems (2014))

2013

- Black Lab Productions - "The Four Horsemen" from The Black Lab Mixtape (2013)
- Blood Stained Phoenix - "Unclasp" from Post Modern Mechanics (2013) (track also appears on Rare Gems (2014))
- Blown - "Acid Rain" from Cloudy Daze (2013) (track also appears on Rare Gems (2014))
- Deft Aphid - "Open Like a Browser" from HardeNET (2013) (track also appears on Rare Gems (2014))
- Dior Sentai - "Sword & Sandal" from http:/ /WeWin.Edu (2013) (track also appears on Rare Gems (2014))
- DotCult - "Naughty by Nature" from The Three Beggars (2013) (track also appears on Rare Gems (2014))
- Greencarpetedstairs - "Keep It Soaked" from 1222 (2013)
- Gregory Pepper & Madadam - "House on Wheels" from Big Huge Truck (2013) (track also appears on Upside Down Bluejay (2008))
- Molly Gruesome - "Going Gonzo" from Spitfire (2013) (track released as single in 2012; also appears on Rare Gems (2014))
- Notorious BEN - "Human Horse Race" from Mind of Many Voices (2013)
- Party Trash - "Start It Up" (2013) (track also appears on Rare Gems (2014))
- Psynlangwage - "We Do It Great" from Closed Captions (2013)
- Shady Blaze - "Another Dimension 2.0" from Green Ova's Most Hated (2013)
- Swag Toof - "D.G.A.F. Boyz" (2013) (track also appears on Rare Gems (2014))

2014

- Party Trash - "Money & Music" & "Riddles & Conundrums" from Melt (20 Jan) ("Money & Music" also appears on Rare Gems (2014))
- Bo Gus & Uncle Ando - "Fingers Crossed" from Half There (23 Jan)
- DotCult - "Mouf" from #YFB (4 Feb)
- Zachg - "The Shine" from South Florida Mountains (20 Apr)
- Pictureplane - "Tropical Fruit" from The Alien Body Mixtape (1 May) (track also appears on Tropical Fruit (2013))
- Yawning Boy - "Diddy at Burning Man (Remix)" from "2 Remixes" (27 May)
- mcenroe - "Petroleum Soda" from Burnt Orange (20 Aug)
- Drummachinemike - "Sound Investments" & "The Catapult" from Drum Machine Music (23 Sep)
- Lil Tofu - "Space" from Soy (21 Oct)
- Clops & Kevork - "Porterhouse" from Ayo Man, Wanna Rap on This Track? Vol. 2 (28 Oct)

2015

- 88 Ultra - "A Thousand & One" from Sirens (14 Jan)
- Bom Trvdy - "Half-Time" from Foxboro (1 Feb)
- Skyscrvpxr - "SoulEaters" (18 Feb)
- AJ Suede - "Necronomicon" from Gold and Earth (4 Mar)
- Sortahuman - "Dry" from Sortahuman4Life (8 Mar)
- Mosch - "Mutated Communications" (24 Mar)
- 88 Ultra & No Merci - "Glowing" & "We Could Never Be" from Para Bellum (1 Jul)

== Tracks appear on ==
- "Octave" on Persona Non Grata #58: The Magnificent Seven [2nd Rec disc] (Persona Non Grata, 2003) (track also appears on Quicksand (2002))
- "Nova Toast" on The MadstAttic Mixtape (BrainKave Productions, 2003) (track also appears on Jupiter Sajitarius (2004))
- "Amnesia" on Bassments of Badmen, Vol. 2 (Hand'Solo Records, 2003)
- "Soylent Brown" & "Tokyo Strings" on Farewell Archetypes (Plague Language, 2004)
- "Saw Palmetto" on Lastebil (Debris from a Fragmented Culture Vol. 1) (2004) (track also appears on Quicksand (2002))
- "Crypto Sporidian" on 21 Loops in Pang (Debris from a Fragmented Culture Vol. 5) (Hansen & Nilsen, 2004) (track also appears on Quicksand (2002))
- "Freelance Zenarchist" on Mind the Gap Vol. 53 (Gonzo Circus, 2004) (track also appears on Jupiter Sajitarius (2004))
- "Crunch" on sUPERIORbelly (Compilation) (sUPERIORbelly, 2005) (track also appears on Pirate Utopias (77 Lost Scrolls) (2011))
- "Photo Soul Decay" on Sónar 2005 (Sonarmusic, 2005) (track also appears on Jupiter Sajitarius (2004))
- "Nocturnal" & "Soylent Brown" on Top 40 Suicide / Hypodraulics (Vulgar, 2005) ("Nocturnal" also appears on Quicksand (2002))
- "Digestive Enzymes" on Orchestrated B-Boy Screams (Vulgar, 2005) (track also appears on Quicksand (2002))
- "Spider Dollie" on Hue and Laugh and Cry: Sounds of Humming Hip Hop (Hue Records, 2006) (track also appears on Amalthea Magnetosphere (2006))
- "Fathom (Up Remix)" on Du Ska Inte Tro Det Blir Sommar: Beats, Breaks & Big Smiles Vol. 2 (Beats, Breaks & Big Smiles, 2007)
- "Chicken Pox" on 2nd Rec Sampler (2nd Rec, 2007) (track also appears on Jupiter Sajitarius (2004))
- "Iggy Igloo" on The Motherboard Compilation: Intel Inside (Secret Cloud, 2008) (track also appears on Pirate Utopias (77 Lost Scrolls) (2011))
- "Ill Shit" on Survival: True Stories from the Underground (SIQ Records, 2008)
- "Keep The Channel Locked" on Hokey Religions & Ancient Weapons (Are No Match for a Good Blaster) (Hand'Solo, 2008)
- "Probability Bandits" on Free Shabazz (Ricky Shabazz and the Boom Bap Boys, 2010) (track also appears on Vision and Voice (2011))
- "Bright Green Laces" on A Record Label Sampler Vol. 2 (Fake Four Inc., 2010) (track also appears on Fry Cook on Venus (2011))
- "Sea of the Infinite Wave (Le Parasite Remix)" on A Record Label Sampler Vol. 3 (Fake Four Inc., 2011) (track also appears on Fry Cook on Venus (2011))
- "New Dawn" on Underground Hip-Hop Vol. 7 (Urbnet, 2011) (track also appears on The Terminal Illness EP (2011))
- "Bleeding Edge So Wet" on Theway Peoplestare: One Year Anniversary (Mundo Urbano, 2011) (track also appears on Occult Trill II: The Sun Rewinds (2011))
- "Twilight Hours" on Grim Harvest (Mishka, 2012) (track also appears on Rare Gems (2014))
- "Solitary Man" on Digital Flowerings Vol. 1 (Internet Hippy, 2014)
- "Swag Safari" on Friends of the Universe (Dior Sentai, 2015)

== Miscellaneous tracks ==
The below is an incomplete list of tracks that have not appeared on any official release, either by Noah23 or others. Some dates are estimated; some titles are unofficial.

- "Operation Mindfuck" (1998) (featuring Fippad)
- "Biological Film" (2003) (featuring Stella Maris; produced by Rev. Left)
- "Beauty Is a Curse" (2006) (featuring Homesick & Livestock)
- "G" (2006) (featuring Hangnail & Livestock)
- "Posse Cut" (2006) (featuring Baracuda, DS, Lord Kufu, The Main & Tykus)
- "Rough Weather" (2006) (featuring DS & Tykus, produced by Madadam)
- "Executioner" (2007) (featuring The Main, produced by Crunk Chris)
- "Every New Day (Factor Mash Up)" (2009) (music by Factor Chandelier)
- "Black Lab Mixtape Verse" (2010) (produced by Thavius Beck; an abridged version of "The Four Horsemen" from The Black Lab Mixtape (2013) by Black Lab Productions)
- "Red Panties (It's Over)" (2010) (featuring CrashDDZ & MaxSevenEight, produced by Richard Herrell; a remix of this track by RK Beatmaker appears on Rare Gems (2014))
- "Yawn Freestyle" (2010)
- "Broken Mandala" (2011) (as SabrToof)
- "The Come Up" (2011) (featuring C. Banks; an abridged version of this track appears on Pirate Utopias (77 Lost Scrolls) (2011))
- "Crack Genie" (2011) (as SabrToof)
- "Devour" (2011) (as SabrToof)
- "Divine Bewilderer (Haris the Terrist Mix)" (2011)
- "Even Keel" (2011) (produced by Slew)
- "Factory Setting" (2011) (as SabrToof)
- "Hippy Jazz Apocalypse (Freestyle)" (2011)
- "Holy Are You (Freestyle)" (2011) (music by Nick Wiz)
- "Keep My Name Off Ya Lips" (2011) (featuring Modulok, produced by Madadam)
- "Nature Plex" (2011) (as SabrToof)
- "Nuts (Demo Fuzz Mix)" (2011) (featuring Liz Powell, produced by Cars & Trains)
- "Sea of the Infinite Wave (Dynamo414 Remix)" (featuring Ceschi & Myka 9)
- "Sea of the Infinite Wave (Expanding Ripples Leifkolt Remix)" (featuring Ceschi & Myka 9)
- "Sea of the Infinite Wave (Le Parasite Remix)" (featuring Ceschi & Myka 9; an abridged version of this track appears on Noah23 for Dummies (2012))
- "Shallots Freestyle" (2011) (featuring Baracuda & Tykus; music by MF Doom)
- "Sink Your Teeth In" (2011) (as SabrToof)
- "So Cool" (2011) (featuring The Main; music by MF Doom)
- "Theme" (2011) (as SabrToof)
- "Too Deep to Sleep" (2011) (featuring Livestock & The Main; produced by Madadam)
- "Dark Light" (2012) (featuring Baracuda, Lord Kufu & The Main)
- "Levitating Chariots" (2012) (featuring Lord Kufu & The Main)
- "Mechanical Bull (Chopped & Screwed)" (2012) (featuring Baracuda)
- "Makin' a Movie" (2013) (produced by Madadam)
- "Red Panties (Chukchee Remix)" (2013) (featuring CrashDDZ & MaxSevenEight, produced by Chukchee)
- "Retro Specks" (2013) (produced by Khalil Nova; appeared on the sampler Gold Vol. 3 by music blog Jealous Gold)
- "Tropical Fruit (Remix)" (2013) (produced by Live Action Fezz)

== Music videos ==
The below is a list of music videos containing original footage (videos composed entirely of excerpts from other material are excluded).

- "Edgar Cayce" (11 November 2006) (from Technoshamanism (2006))
- "Cranky Banditz" (15 March 2008) (from Bourgeois Cyborgs (2008))
- "Bright Green Laces" (22 May 2010) (from Fry Cook on Venus (2011))
- "Fame" (27 September 2010) (from Rock Paper Scissors (2008))
- "Genius Madman" (30 December 2010) (from Noah23 / Playpad Circus (2010))
- "Factory Setting" (4 March 2011) (as SabrToof)
- "Intangible Heart Crescendo" (2 July 2011) (from Fry Cook on Venus (2011))
- "Do What Thou Wilt" (8 August 2011) (from Occult Trill: The Witch-Tape (2011))
- "Crosses + Roses" (8 August 2011) (from Occult Trill: The Witch-Tape (2011))
- "Drag Star" (22 September 2011) (from Occult Trill II: The Sun Rewinds (2011))
- "No Summer" (10 October 2011) (from Occult Trill II: The Sun Rewinds (2011))
- "Hunchback of Ontario" (24 October 2011) (from Occult Trill II: The Sun Rewinds (2011))
- "Carpe Diem" (21 November 2011) (from Illegal Ideas Inc. (2011))
- "Renegades" (7 December 2011) (from Occult Trill II: The Sun Rewinds (2011))
- "Burning Bridges" (5 September 2012) (from Vision and Voice (2011))
- "Hollow Earth" (6 September 2012) (from Heart of Rock (2010))
- "Tropical Fruit" (28 January 2013) (from Tropical Fruit (2013))
- "Wingfoot" (23 April 2013) (from Wingfoot (2012))
- "The Script" (19 August 2013) (from Occult Trill III: Blast Master Therion (2013))
- "Silent Night" (19 December 2013) (from XXXMAS by Fame Corp (2010))
- "Diddy at Burning Man" (14 May 2014) (from Delicate Genius (2014))
- "Jaguar" (23 July 2014) (from Occult Trill III: Blast Master Therion (2014))
- "Glory of the Light" (21 December 2014) (from Occult Trill III: Blast Master Therion (2014))
- "Zeta Beta" (3 April 2015) (from Noah23 x Blown (2015))
- "Terence McKenna" (8 April 2015) (from Peacock Angel (2015))
- "Heaven" (21 April 2015) (from Vision and Voice (2011))
- "Phantasy" (24 May 2015) (from Peacock Angel (2015))
- "Dust" (21 June 2015) (from Noah23 x Blown (2015))
- "Vegas" (23 June 2015) (from Noah23 x Blown (2015))
- "Yin Yang Pinky Ring" (26 July 2015) (from Peacock Angel (2015))
- "Based Rock n Roll" (14 July 2016) (from Zoom (2011))
- "Days That We Livin In" (26 July 2016) (from Discordian Pope (2016))
- "Feng Shui" (27 July 2016) (from Peacock Angel (2015))
- "Super String" (3 August 2016) (from Discordian Pope (2016))
- "Blood" (29 September 2016) (from Blood (2014))
- "Down for the Cause" (12 October 2016) (from Light Years (2014))
- "Scarlet" (28 October 2016) (from Occult Trill III: Blast Master Therion (2013))
- "Best to Ever Do It" (19 September 2017) (from Aquarian Alien (2015))
- "Headphones" (31 July 2019) (from Light Years (2014))
- "Forever in a Day" (16 July 2020) (from Wingfoot (2012))
- "How Many" (23 September 2020) (from Peacock Angel (2015))
- "Illuminati Christmas Party" (18 December 2020) (from Illuminati Christmas (2015))
- "23 'Til Infinity" (24 July 2021)
- "Dark Cry$tal" (31 July 2021) (from Peacock Angel (2015))
