= Start It Up =

Start It Up may refer to:

- "Start It Up" (Shake It Up), an episode of Shake It Up

== Music ==
- "Start It Up", a song by Maceo Pinkard 1920
- "Start It Up", a song by A Tribe Called Quest from The Love Movement 1998
- "Start It Up" (song), a song by Lloyd Banks from H.F.M. 2 2010
- "Start It Up", a song by Swedish singer September from Dancing Shoes
- "Start It Up", a song by Christ Church Choir. 36th GMA Dove Awards
- "Start It Up", a song by Noah23, Noah23 discography 2013
- "Start It Up", a song by Australian band New Waver
- "Start It Up", a song by Robben Ford from The Firm (Motion Picture Soundtrack) and album Robben Ford & the Blue Line
- "Start It Up", a song by Charm City Devils written by Kevin Kadish
- "Start It Up", a song by Richie Kotzen from Nothing to Lose (Forty Deuce album)
- "Start It Up", a song by Dawn Tyler Watson from Saturday Night Blues: 20 Years
- "Start It Up", a song by Fatback from So Delicious 1985
