= Knucklebone (disambiguation) =

Knucklebone is a group of five long bones in the midfoot.

Knucklebone may also refer to:

- The knuckles, or metacarpal bones
- Knucklebones, a game
- Knucklebone (album), a 2008 album by the musician Baracuda.
