= Kate Schutt =

American singer and songwriter (born 1975)

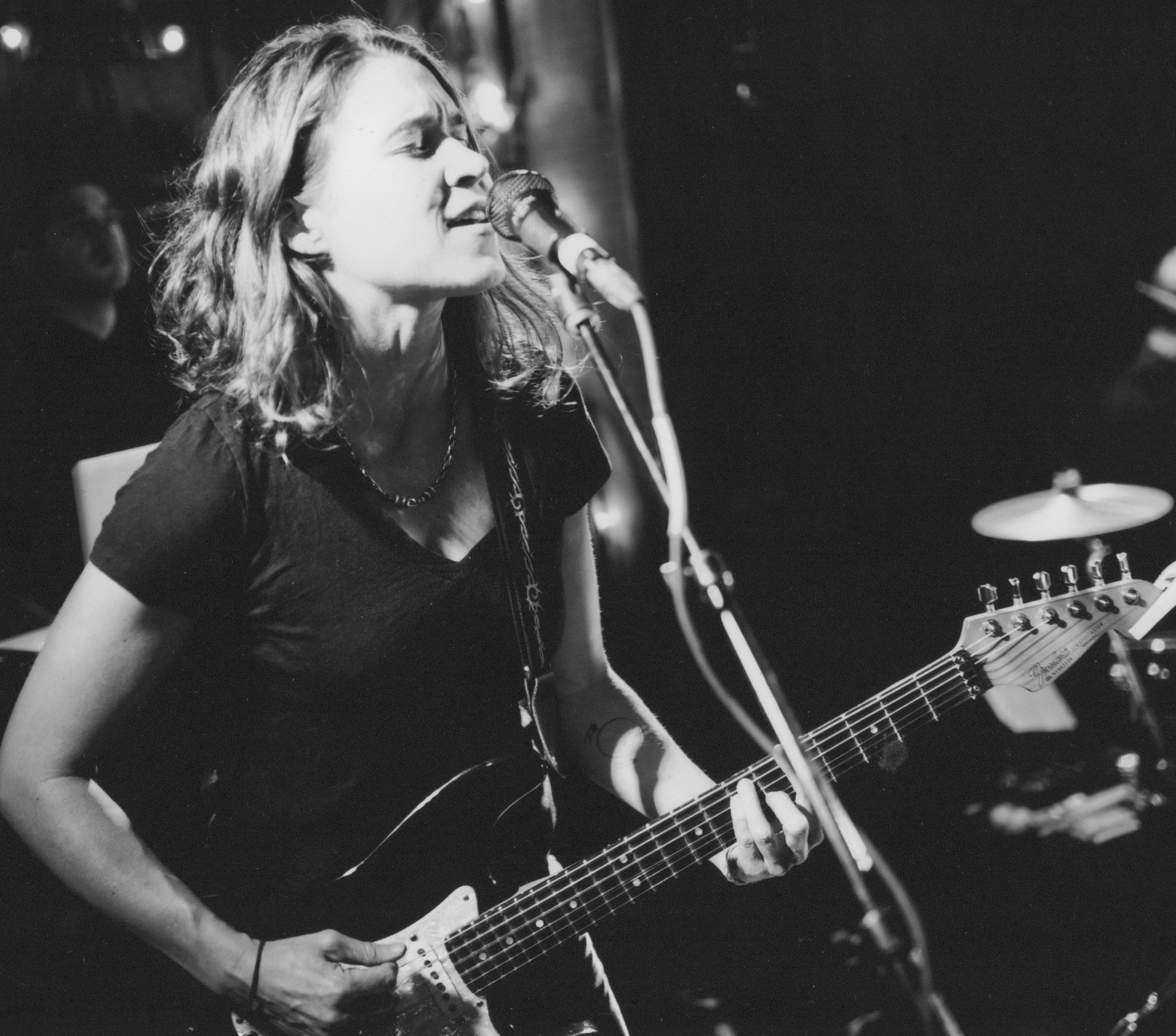

Background information
- Born: January 31, 1975 (age 51)
- Origin: Chadds Ford, Pennsylvania, USA
- Genres: Jazz, Folk, Adult Contemporary, Rock, Pop
- Occupations: Producer, Singer/Songwriter, Arranger, Entrepreneur
- Instruments: Vocals, Guitar, Bass, Drums
- Years active: 1999–present
- Labels: Wild Whip Records, LLC, ArtistShare
- Website: Official website

Kate Schutt is an American singer and songwriter who has released two albums No Love Lost and The Telephone Game.

== Career ==
Schutt learned to play the guitar as a child and began playing the guitar and writing songs at the age of 11. She gave first performance when she was 12 and wrote her first song at 13. She studied at The Berklee College of Music and Harvard University. In 2002, she had throat surgery and did not perform again until July 2003. She released a five-song EP, Heart-Shot, in 2003, on which Schutt played a Novax 8-string guitar/bass hybrid for the first time. In 2004, she released her second EP, Paper Crown Project.

She has released two albums, No Love Lost (2007), and The Telephone Game (2008), through ArtistShare. No Love Lost topped the jazz charts in Canada. Schutt was a winner of the jazz category in Session II of the John Lennon Songwriting Contest in 2007.

In 2009, NPR called her voice “glassily clear and glossily sweet.” In 2021, American Songwriter called her album Bright Nowhere “illuminating” and “the work that ought to bring her the wider recognition she so decidedly deserves."

Winner of the 6th annual Independent Music Awards Vox Pop vote for best Jazz song "Two Halves of a Broken Heart". Schutt's "How Much in Love" was also nominated for the 7th Annual Independent Music Awards for Jazz song of the year. The Philadelphia News calls her "an enticingly languid vocalist, wry composer and sophisticated arranger in the pop/jazz vein." In 2000, Schutt founded her own label, Wild Whip Records. She lived in Guelph, Ontario, Canada from 2004 until 2010, playing and collaborating with Canadian musicians Duane Andrews, Michael Phillip Wojewoda, Andrew McPherson, Noah23, and the band Gregory Pepper and His Problems. In 2010, she relocated to Manhattan. Here her collaborators include Julian Lage and Scott Colley. She was a friend of the late guitarist Jim Hall.

== Discography ==
Year	Album	Label
2007	No Love Lost	ArtistShare
2009	Telephone Game	ArtistShare
2021	Bright Nowhere	ArtistShare

== Personal life ==
Schutt lives in New York City. In November 2019 she delivered a TEDx (conference) talk called, "A grief casserole - how to help your friends and family through loss" about the experience of being her mother's caregiver for nearly five years.

== Honors and awards ==
Winner in the Jazz category of the 2007 Session-II John Lennon Songwriting Contest for the song "How Much In Love" in the Jazz category

ASCAP Plus Award winner 2006, 2007, 2008, 2009 in Jazz Composition
