= Livestock (rapper) =

- Also known as: Livestock One; The Hilarious Livestock; Horse Thief
- Origin: Guelph, Ontario, Canada
- Genres: Alternative hip hop Underground hip hop
- Occupation: Rapper
- Years active: 1999–2011
- Labels: Plague Language; Legendary Entertainment

Benjamin Reeve, better known by his stage name Livestock, is a rapper from Guelph, Ontario. Livestock was a long-time member of the Plague Language collective founded by Noah23 and Orphan.

== History ==
Prior to rapping, in the late 1990s, Livestock performed locally as a hip hop DJ under the alias Beetle Juice aka Beetle Jiggly, inspired by the Beat Junkies as well as local Guelph DJs Bias Ply, DJ Basic, B Art, NV US, Tom, and DJ Krinjah. After DJing and organizing local hip hop concerts in the late '90s and early 2000s, Livestock began learning the craft of lyricism with Noah23 after-hours at a vegan restaurant in Guelph called the Cafe Aquarius where Noah was chef. Among his influences in this period were Will Oldham, Neko Case, Project Blowed, El-P, Anti-Pop Consortium, Deep Puddle Dynamics, Divine Styler, and Warcloud. It was around this time that Livestock and a few other local hip hop artists including Noah23, Treevortex, DJ Cloev, and others shared a local jam hall (the House of Velvet jam space) for a weekly freestyle session.

Livestock's first release was as a member of the group The Twin Sisters with Naval Avatar and Treevortex. The group released one EP, entitled Amulet, in 2002.

In early 2004, Livestock compiled the collaborative songs of himself, Noah23 and Homesick under the group name The Train Rawbers. This material was initially released on the Spring equinox of 2004, but then was mastered and re-released in later that Fall. The album is credited to the three MCs equally, but is primarily "Livestock's brainchild, featuring [Noah23] and Homesick". Livestock features on all tracks, while Noah23 features on six, and Homesick features on only four. The album was initially released with the subtitle "Volume 1", though no further volumes of material were officially released. In November 2004, Livestock released his debut solo album, Spiral Like the 9, which was recorded in the office at the Cafe Aquarius mainly during business hours while the restaurant was operational.

Livestock recorded extensively from 2003 to 2007, releasing multiple projects. These projects included his second solo album, Iridium 77, produced entirely by Leon Murphy (then known as Greysol); an EP produced by core Plague Language member Madadam, entitled Walk Down the Street; a collaborative album with MC Hangnail under the name The World Within, entitled Welcome 2 the World Within; his third solo album, The Afterlife of Jazz, with production by Leon Murphy and Madadam; a second project with Leon Murphy, The Rawganic EP; and a collaborative album with Noah23 and Madadam, under the name The Weird Apples, entitled The Big Crunch, originally released on Burnt Oak Records in the summer of 2007, then re-released by Legendary Entertainment in March 2008.

All of the above albums, except for The Big Crunch, were initially released independently by Livestock himself with DIY artwork and individually produced CDs under his own imprint called Train Rawbers Family Productions. Livestock created and released over 1000 copies of both The Train Rawbers and Spiral Like the 9 and over 500 copies of most of the subsequent albums.

From 2008 onward, Livestock released little material. With the exception of a small number of guest appearances on releases by Noah23, The Main and Gregory Pepper, the only project Livestock significantly contributed to was the classic rock-themed Plague Language mixtape Instant Classic in August 2009. On this release, Livestock was credited alongside MC Tykus under the group name Karma Kings, though no collaborative project ultimately surfaced. Livestock stopped rapping in 2011 after performing alongside Ceschi and Gregory Pepper at the Jimmy Jazz in Guelph. The last track he recorded was a love song titled "The Queen of Space" featuring Scotobot and Karl Skene. In November 2011, he released his entire back catalogue for free via the Plague Language Tumblr page. Included in the upload was his final album, For My Man Sittin' on a Boat, which is a compilation of his mostly unreleased post-2007 music. This album was dedicated to a friend of Livestock's named Sean who lived on a boat off the gulf coast of British Columbia. Another previously unreleased EP, Shucky Ducky, was also included in the upload.

In 2018, Livestock removed all of his own music from the internet due to concerns regarding the political views of some of his former collaborators. That same year, he began PhD studies in sociology. His initial research focus was on the topic of racism within white-majority music and hip hop communities in Canada, inspired by his own personal frustrations with what he perceived as the racism endemic in the music/hip hop community in Guelph, Ontario and the surrounding area. His current research focus is decolonizing studies more widely.

== Discography ==
Solo albums

- Spiral Like the 9 (Legendary Entertainment, 2004)
- Iridium 77 (Legendary Entertainment, 2006) (produced by Leon Murphy)
- The Afterlife of Jazz (Legendary Entertainment, 2007)
- For My Man Sittin' on a Boat (Plague Language, 2011)

Collaboration albums

- The Train Rawbers (Legendary Entertainment, 2004) (with Noah23 & Homesick, as The Train Rawbers)
- Welcome 2 the World Within (Legendary Entertainment, 2006) (with Hangnail, as The World Within)
- The Big Crunch (Burnt Oak, 2007) (with Noah23 & Madadam, as The Weird Apples)

EPs

- Amulet (2002) (with Naval Aviator & Treevortex, as The Twin Sisters)
- Walk Down the Street (Legendary Entertainment, 2006) (produced by Madadam)
- The Rawganic EP (Legendary Entertainment, 2007) (produced by Leon Murphy)
- Shucky Ducky (Plague Language, 2008)

Mixtapes

- Instant Classic (Plague Language, 2009) (with Plague Language Fam)

Compilations

- Plague Language Compilation (Plague Language, 2009) (with Baracuda, Lord Kufu, Madadam, The Main & Noah23)

Guest appearances

- Noah23 - "Cellular Automata" from Neophyte Phenotype (2001)
- Baracuda - "Satellites" from Tetragammoth (2002)
- Noah23 - "Discordia" from Tau Ceti (2003)
- Noah23 - "Kinetic Embryo Isotope" & "Coconut Bomb" from Sigma Octantis (2004)
- Noah23 - "Zapata Physicians" from Jupiter Sajitarius (2004)
- Urbonics - "Cease Fire" from 514/519/APE (2004)
- Homesick - "Shell Shock Rock" from Tangent Wars (2005)
- Noah23 - "Nazca Plateau" from Clout (2006)
- CRUNK23 - "Akashic Record Breakers" from Technoshamanism (2006)
- Noah23 - "Weird Science" from Cameo Therapy (2007)
- Baracuda - "Final Splash" from Knucklebone (2008)
- Noah23 - "Raw Nukes" from Rock Paper Scissors (2008)
- Noah23 - "Anarcho-Taoists" from Upside Down Bluejay (2008)
- New Cocoon - "Axis Dimensions" from A New Plague of Diseased Language Cocoons Vol. 1 (2009)
- Anubis5 - "House of Mystery" from Let's Talk Language (2010)
- Noah23 & Playpad Circus - "Radio Plasma" from Noah23 / Playpad Circus (2010)
- Noah23 - "Isis Hathor", "Blueberry Soup", "The Fasting Sun", "Ninja Pizza", "Almond Wine", "Astro Turf", "The News", "Coconut Baum", "Turquoise Soap Bubble", "House of Teeth" & "Axis Dimensions" from Pirate Utopias (77 Lost Scrolls) (2011)
- The Main - "Flowers of Evil" & "Punch Card Blues" from Clamnesia (2011)
- Noah23 - "Axe Murderer" from Noah23 for Dummies (2012)
- Gregory Pepper & Madadam - "Fronting in Your Heartbone" from Big Huge Truck (2013)

== See also ==
- Canadian hip hop
- Plague Language
