= Penny (rapper) =

American rapper

- Born: Penny Dahl c.1981
- Origin: San Francisco, California, US
- Genres: Alternative hip hop, underground hip hop
- Occupations: Rapper, poet, singer, producer
- Years active: 2002–present
- Labels: Plague Language, Fake Four Inc.
- Website: pennydahl.com

Penny Dahl, better known mononymously as Penny, is an alternative hip hop artist based in San Francisco, California and formerly affiliated with the Plague Language collective. She released her debut album, The Clockforth Movement, on Plague Language on October 29, 2002. On January 4, 2013, Fake Four Inc. released Twenties Hungry: The Unbound Anthems of Yesteryear, an EP collecting various Penny recordings from 2003 through 2006.

== Discography ==
Albums

- The Clockforth Movement (2002, Plague Language)

EPs

- Twenties Hungry: The Unbound Anthems of Yesteryear (2013, Fake Four Inc.)

Compilations

- Miscellanea (2005, Beyond Space Entertainment)

Guest appearances

- Ceschi – "Not Sure" from Fake Flowers (2004)
- Bleubird & Scott da Ros – "Fuck You, We Don't Need You (Mega Posse Cut)" (2008)

Featured tracks

- "Our Addict Rings" appears on Panic Room (2003, Animal Factory)
- "Dreams" appears on Farewell Archetypes Vol. 2 (2004, Subversiv Rec/Plague Language)
- "Early Humans May Have Used Makeup, Seafood" appears on 52 Weeks (2008, Peppermill Records)

== See also ==
- Plague Language
- Fake Four Inc.
