= Bleubird =

American rapper

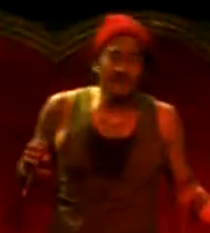
- Bleubird performing in 2012

Background information
- Born: Jacques Bruna
- Origin: Fort Lauderdale, Florida, US
- Genres: Hip-hop, indie hip-hop, alternative hip-hop
- Occupation: Rapper
- Years active: 2000-present
- Label: Fake Four Inc
- Website: www.bleubird.org

Jacques Bruna, better known by his stage name Bleubird is an American rapper originally from Fort Lauderdale, Florida. He is known for his rapid-fire delivery, comic relief, lyrical wit and freestyle ability.

Basing most of his career out of Orlando, he toured relentlessly throughout North America and Europe playing shows with Grand Buffet, Deerhoof, Sixtoo, Sole, Shape Shifters, Solillaquists of Sound and others.

Bleubird has had production help from artists such as Alias, Astronautalis and Radical Face.

== Discography ==
Albums

- The Mic Chord Noose Theory (2000) (with Cracker Jackson, as S.M.T.H.)
- Does Man's Short Life Span Make Any Sense (2002)
- Sloppy Doctor (2003)
- Pretty Pretty Please (2004) (with Marcus, Nomad, Siaz & Xndl, as Gunporn)
- From Supercold to Superheat (2006)
- RIP U$A (The Birdfleu) (2007)
- Don't Let Nerds Take Over Your Life (2010) (with jayrope, as Prinzenallee)
- Fuck! (2010) (with Edison & Thesis Sahib, as Les Swashbuckling Napoleons)
- Seven Days Six Nights (2011) (with Scott da Ros & Sibitt, as Triune Gods)
- Cannonball!!! (2012)
- Lauderdale (2015)

EPs

- Sunday Picnic (2002)
- Pilgrim of St. Zotique (2006)
- Street Talk 2 (2008)
- Street Talk 5 (2009)
- JFX Meets Bleubird EP (2011)
- Yung Planetz EP (2012) (with K-the-I??? & Sole, as Waco Boyz)

Mixtapes

- Street Talk III: The Mixtape (2009)

Podcasts

- Hyper Standstill (2010) (with jayrope, as Prinzenallee)

Singles

- "Shiver Me Timbers / Skywriter" (2003) (with Les Swashbuckling Napoleons)
- "Rocket Mouth" (2007)
- "In Static (Strange and Gentle Things) / Wild Street Fire" (2009) (with Les Swashbuckling Napoleons)
- "Same Train" (2011) (with Triune Gods)

Guest appearances

- Grand Buffet - "Americus" from Pittsburgh Hearts (2004)
- Nomar Slevik - "Nobody" from Paper Bullets (2004)
- JD Walker - "Since Saturday" from Them Get You Them Got You (2005)
- Sole - "Atheist Jihad" from Live from Rome (2005)
- Cavemen Speak - "Trainingwheel" from Tell All Residents (2005)
- Rushya - "Gypsy" from Plastic (2005)
- Candy's .22 - "Boomer" from Livin La Vida Boo Hoo (2005)
- Scott Da Ros - "They Made Me Do It" from "They Made Me Do It" (2005)
- Scott Da Ros - "Monster Mashout" "Humans Bury Deep" from One Kind of Dead End (2006)
- Nuccini! - "The Dinosaur, The Monkey, The Breakdance" from Matter of Love and Death (2006)
- Debmaster - "Skinnerd" from Monster Zoo (2006)
- Zucchini Drive - "Easy Tiger" from Being Kurtwood (2006)
- Estetik (Audio88 & James P Honey) - "Gangstah Pension / 60 Grad" from "Estetik" (2008)
- Noah23 - "Elephant March" from Rock Paper Scissors (2008)
- James P Honey - "Warm Fuzzy Feeling" from Hugely Overrated by a Tiny Few (2008)
- Audio88 & Yassin - "Rettet Die Wale Und So" from Zwei Herrengedeck, Bitte (2009)
- Sole - "Swagger Like Us" from Nuclear Winter Volume 1 (2010)
- Audio88 - "Ballermannhits" from "Audio88 hat Freunde" (2011)
- Audio88 - "Mutterfucker" from "Audio88 hat Freunde" (2011)
- Noah23 & Krem - "Omens Rustling" from The Terminal Illness EP (2011)
- Sole - "Hustle Hard" from Nuclear Winter Volume 2: Death Panel (2011)

Compilation appearances

- "Matt Dylan" on Beyond Space Presents: A Guide To Burning Bridges (2005)
- "Cartoon Love Bubbles (Remix)" on Project Mooncircle: Lunar Orbit EP (2005)
