= Flight Distance (hip-hop group) =

American hip hop group

- Origin: Ottawa, Ontario, Canada
- Genres: Underground hip hop
- Years active: 2004–2018
- Past members: Bender (Alexander Buchanan); Calkuta (Callum Browne); Patience (Patrick Jodoin)
- Website: flightdistance.net

Flight Distance was an underground hip hop group from Ottawa, Ontario, Canada. The group consisted of MC Patience, DJ Calkuta, and MC/producer Bender, who was a former King of the Dot champion. Flight Distance released three albums throughout their career: Run for Your Lives! in 2005, Bad Information in 2011, and High Priests of Low-Life in 2014. As of December 2014, they had begun work on their fourth album, titled Harmony Chlorine, and continued working on it at the time of Bender's unexpected death on March 1, 2018.

== Discography ==
Albums

- Run for Your Lives! (2005)
- Bad Information (2011)
- High Priests of Low-Life (2014)

EPs

- The Warning Shot (2005)

Singles

- "Real Teeth" (2010)
- "Worth" (2013)
