= With Trumpets Flaring =

Studio album by Gregory Pepper & His Problems
- Released: June 16, 2009
- Recorded: 2007–2009
- Genre: Indie rock, pinball pop
- Length: 29:58
- Label: Fake Four Inc.

Gregory Pepper & His Problems chronology
Gregory Pepper & His Problems (2007)	With Trumpets Flaring (2009)	Escape from Crystal Skull Mountain (2012)

With Trumpets Flaring is the 2009 studio album from Canadian band Gregory Pepper & His Problems, released on Fake Four Inc.

== Track listing ==
No.	Title	Length
1.	"7ths and 3rds"	2:42
2.	"I Was a John"	2:24
3.	"Drop the Plot"	3:04
4.	"Built a Boat"	1:42
5.	"It Must Be True"	4:25
6.	"Knives and Guns"	2:52
7.	"If You Try"	2:08
8.	"There Were Dinosaurs"	1:01
9.	"Tea Biscuits"	2:07
10.	"Feeling Underneath the Weather"	0:58
11.	"Gregory Pepper Coronation"	1:15
12.	"One Man Show"	4:27
13.	"(outro)"	0:53
