= Tetragammoth =

2002 studio album by Baracuda72

Studio album by Baracuda72
- Released: June 22, 2002
- Recorded: 2000–2002
- Genre: Alternative hip hop Underground hip hop Drum and bass
- Length: 45:44
- Label: Plague Language
- Producer: Bionix, Lovely, Orphan, Northstar, Sseleman, Warhol

Baracuda72 chronology
| ''Tetragammoth'' (2002) | Bourgeois Cyborgs (2008) |

Tetragammoth is the 2002 debut album by alternative hip hop artist Baracuda72. Most of the album's production was handled by Orphan, the Plague Language collective's most prolific producer at the time.

The track "Deadly Rays", featuring Plague Language affiliate Noah23, was released as a split single with the track "Crypto Sporidian" from Noah23's album Quicksand. Both tracks were produced by Orphan.

== Track listing ==
1. "Tetragammoth" (ft. StapleMouth)
2. "The Pattern That Lies Beneath Us"
3. "Waking Life Moment"
4. "Human Development"
5. "Deadly Rays" (ft. Noah23)
6. "Ice Age"
7. "Royal City Chainsaw Massacre"
8. "Unpardonable Sins"
9. "Dental Plan" (ft. Noah23)
10. "Mulberry Skies"
11. "Snap"
12. "Satellites" (ft. Livestock)
13. "Mutagen" (ft. Hangnail & Modulok)
14. "Rain Buckets"
15. "Duplicate Version" (ft. Noah23)
16. "Regime"

=== Production credits ===
- Tracks 1, 5-10 & 14-16 produced by Orphan
- Tracks 2 & 13 produced by Lovely
- Track 3 produced by Sseleman
- Track 4 produced by Northstar
- Track 11 produced by Bionix
- Track 12 produced by Warhol
