= The Clockforth Movement =

Studio album by Penny
- Released: October 29, 2002
- Recorded: 2000–2002
- Genre: Alternative hip hop Underground hip hop
- Length: 30:42
- Label: Plague Language
- Producer: Penny, DJ Noreen, Ognihs, Manic Depressive, Rajbot, Wes Bonifay

Penny chronology
The Clockforth Movement (2002)	Miscellanea (2004)

Professional ratings
Review scores
Source	Rating
Dusted Magazine	mixed
Hip Hop Infinity	favorable
UKHH	mixed
URBNET	favorable
XLR8R	favorable

The Clockforth Movement is the 2002 debut album by alternative hip hop artist Penny.

== Track listing ==
No.	Title	Producer(s)	Length
1.	"The Clockforth Movement"	DJ Noreen, Penny	1:18
2.	"Parents"	Ognihs	1:29
3.	"Thisorder"	Manic Depressive	2:05
4.	"Air Drops" (featuring Rajbot)	Manic Depressive	4:00
5.	"The Camera Dance"	Manic Depressive	0:59
6.	"Godzfavor"	Penny	1:08
7.	"The Shift to "N""	Wes Bonifay	2:18
8.	"The Upping Hand"	Rajbot	3:26
9.	"Antique Couplings" (featuring Noah23 and Troubadour)	Manic Depressive	3:48
10.	"The Digestive System"		0:27
11.	"Our Addict Ring"	Manic Depressive	1:54
12.	"Penciled Cursive-Red (Air)"	Wes Bonifay	5:42
