= Dewey Saunders =

American visual artist (born 1983)

Dewey Saunders.
- Also known as: Unless; Emcee Unless; Dewey Decibel; Dewey Bryan
- Born: Dewey Bryan Saunders; August 27, 1983 (age 42); Boynton Beach, Florida, U.S.
- Origin: Philadelphia, Pennsylvania, U.S.
- Genres: Alternative hip hop Underground hip hop
- Occupations: Collage artist, rapper
- Years active: 2008–present
- Labels: The Philadelphia Record Company; Bold New Breed; World Around; New Fuzz; Surf Art
- Website: www.deweysaunders.com

Dewey Bryan Saunders (born August 27, 1983), also known by his forenames Dewey Bryan (and formerly by the stage names Dewey Decibel, Unless and Emcee Unless), is an American collage artist and rapper based in Los Angeles, California. From 2008 to 2011, Saunders released music under the names Unless and Emcee Unless; in 2011 he changed his stage name to Dewey Decibel; and in 2016 he changed his stage name once more to a shortened version of his birth name, Dewey Bryan.

== Discography ==
Studio albums

- Memories of the Future (2008) (as Unless, produced by Raw Thrills)
- Beach Burners (2025) (as Dewey Bryan, produced by Earoh)

Remix albums

- Acapulco Gold (2025) (as Dewey Bryan, produced by Small Professor)

EPs

- Forword (2009) (with producer Rick Friedrich, as The Rubix Qube Exclusive)
- Less Is More (2010) (as Emcee Unless)
- Preface (2011) (with producer Rick Friedrich, as The Rubix Qube Exclusive)
- Son of a Beach (2012) (as Dewey Decibel, produced by Rick Friedrich)
- A Different Drum (2015) (as Dewey Decibel, produced by Zilla Rocca)
- Sub Cult (2015) (as Dewey Decibel, produced by Rick Friedrich)

Mixtapes

- Dewdrops on a Lotus Leaf (2011) (as Emcee Unless aka Dewey Decibel, beats by Flying Lotus)
- #BoomboxBookworm (2012) (as Dewey Decibel, beats by Eligh and Elusive)

Singles

- "Ashes (Zilla Rocca Remix)" (2011) (as Emcee Unless)
- "Met Her in L.A." (2012) (as Dewey Decibel)
- "Love" (2012) (as Dewey Decibel)
- "Never Gave a Shit" (2014) (as Dewey Decibel)
- "Waverider" (2015) (as Dewey Decibel)
- "Drippy / Syrup" (2019) (with rapper Drusef, as The Sauce)
- "Lowkey / Ride" (2020) (with rapper Drusef, as The Sauce)
- "Buzzin" (2025) (as Dewey Bryan, produced by Earoh)
- "Real Chop" (2025) (as Dewey Bryan, produced by Earoh)
- "Chateau" (2025) (as Dewey Bryan, produced by Earoh, featuring Kam DeLa)
- "West Side" (2025) (as Dewey Bryan, produced by Earoh, featuring Eligh)
- "Two-a-Days" (2025) (as Dewey Bryan, produced by Earoh, featuring Blu)
- "Plateau" (2025) (as Dewey Bryan, produced by Small Professor, featuring Kam DeLa)

Featured tracks

- "Two Sides" on Wormhole Presents... A New Plague of Diseased Language Cocoons Vol. 2 (2010) (as Emcee Unless)

Guest appearances

- Noah23 - "Two Sides" on Pirate Utopias (77 Lost Scrolls) (2011)
- Zilla Rocca - "Chic-O-Stic" on Neo Noir (2013)
- Noah23 x Blown - "Boom Bap" on Noah23 x Blown (2015)
- Curly Castro & Fakts One - "Rammellzeed" on Restroy & Debuild (2015)
- Lustre - "Luxurious" on Heart Divine (2015)
- Career Crooks - "Newlywed" on Good Luck with That (2017)
- Netherfriends - "Eggs" on Everybody Eats (2019)
- Zilla Rocca - "Newlywed (Zilla Rocca Grand Royal Remix)" on Anything I Touch I Bruise Vol. 3: Creators & Swindlers (2020)
