= Cannonball!!! =

Studio album by Bleubird
- Released: January 24, 2012
- Genre: Alternative hip-hop
- Length: 36:50
- Label: Fake Four Inc.
- Producer: Astronautalis, Radical Face

Bleubird chronology
RIP U$A (The Birdfleu) (2007)	Cannonball!!! (2012)	Lauderdale (2015)

Professional ratings
Review scores
Source	Rating
Exclaim!	favorable
Verbicide	favorable

Cannonball!!! is a 2012 studio album by American rapper Bleubird, released on Fake Four Inc. Production is handled by Astronautalis and Radical Face. "Time 4real" features a guest appearance from Ceschi.

== Critical reception ==
Thomas Quinlan of Exclaim! said, "While not your typical hip-hop album, fans open to experimentation with different genres will find Cannonball!!! a rewarding, if eclectic, half-hour-plus of music." Brett Uddenberg of URB called it Bleubird's "most focused and well-rounded" work to date.

== Track listing ==
No.	Title	Length
1.	"Fog Rollin'"	3:11
2.	"Hand Holdin'"	2:34
3.	"Giehe 1977"	3:55
4.	"Black Sandcastles"	2:33
5.	"Hello Hollow" (featuring Astronautalis)	4:02
6.	"Christian Wife" (featuring Lynne Piper)	2:26
7.	"Down Like Brothers" (featuring Radical Face)	2:29
8.	"Pimp Hand"	4:32
9.	"Dead Homes"	3:40
10.	"Time 4real" (featuring Ceschi)	4:15
11.	"Rubber Bands"	3:03
