= Bender (rapper) =

Canadian rapper (1980–2018)

- Also known as: Al Bender, Bender Stratocaster
- Born: Alexander Buchanan; July 19, 1980; Ottawa, Ontario, Canada
- Origin: Ottawa, Ontario, Canada
- Died: March 1, 2018 (aged 37) Montreal, Quebec, Canada
- Genres: Underground hip hop
- Occupations: Rapper, producer, artist
- Years active: 1996–2018
- Formerly of: Flight Distance
- Website: flightdistance.com

Alexander Buchanan (July 19, 1980 – March 1, 2018), better known by his stage name Bender, was a Canadian rapper.

He was a member of the group Flight Distance and a former King of the Dot champion. Bender was also a professional visual artist.

Bender died on March 1, 2018, aged 37, in Montreal, Quebec, Canada. No cause of death has been released, but an article has reported that he may have died from sleep apnea.

== Discography ==
=== Albums ===
Solo

- The Squidmilker Instrumentals (2004)

Flight Distance (Bender with Patience & DJ Calkuta)

- Run for Your Lives! (2005)
- Bad Information (2011)
- High Priests of Low-Life (2014)

Other collaborations

- Soma Holiday (1996) (with Sunshine Dick Surprise)

=== EPs, singles ===
EPs

- The Warning Shot (2005) (with Flight Distance)
- Chuck B vs The Boombaptist (2011)

Singles

- "Real Teeth" (2010) (with Flight Distance)
- "All Crushed Under the Same Terrible Wheel" (2011) (with Flight Distance)
- "Worth" (2013) (with Flight Distance)

=== Guest appearances ===
- Atherton & Sire - "Indifferent in Significance" from A Different Way of Doing the Same Old Thing (2006)
- Self Driven - "3 Strikes", "Musical Youth", "Dyno Killas" & "No Life (Remix)" from Self Driven (2006)
- 24/7 – "White Chalk" (2010)
- Noah23 – "Air Guitar" from Heart of Rock (2010)
- Prehistoric - "Short Bus" from Forgive the Hero (2012)
- Bruff - "On the Block" from Skidoo Soup (2012)
- 24/7 – "Pulling Teeth" from A.I. Project (2012)
- Charron – "Go In" from Bath Salts & Vinegar Chips (2013)
- Eskr-One – "Iron Fist" from Beautiful Decay (2013)
- Prehistoric – "Perspective" from Walking Backwards on an Escalator (2013)
- Giant Gorilla Dog Thing – "Stonewall" from Horse (2014)
- D-Sisive – "And They Hide Their Eyes" from The Great Mr. Nobody (One) (2014)
- Noah23 x DJ Coutz – "Campy Squalor" from Discordian Pope (2016)
- Real Deal – "The Axis of Evil" from The Mount Oliver Project (2017)
- Prehistoric – "Another Day" from Elephant Graveyard (2018)
- Buck-n-Nice – "Ocean or Shallow End" from EMAG (2018)
- Ramcliff – "Human Language" from Ramcliff (2019)

== See also ==
- Canadian hip hop
