= Rock Paper Scissors (album) =

Studio album by Noah23
- Released: September 23, 2008
- Genre: Hip-hop
- Length: 70:00
- Labels: Legendary Entertainment, Plague Language
- Producers: Noah23 (exec.), Anucongo, Ceschi, Debmaster, Eclekt, Factor Chandelier, Fresh Kils, Giovanni Marks, Gregory Pepper, Jim Guthrie, Lord Kufu, Madadam, Mr Soch, Naval Aviator, Playpad Circus, Riff Raff, The Sad Clowns, Small Is Beautiful, Thur Deephrey, Zoën

Noah23 chronology
Dirty Bling (2008)	Rock Paper Scissors (2008)	Upside Down Bluejay (2008)

Professional ratings
Review scores
Source	Rating
Cokemachineglow	79/100
Hip Hop Core	3/5 stars
Mowno	favorable
Now	4/5 stars
PopMatters	7/10 stars
URB	3.5/5 stars
URBNET	4/5 stars

Rock Paper Scissors is a 2008 studio album by Canadian hip-hop artist Noah23, released on Legendary Entertainment and Plague Language. A music video was produced for "Fame".

== Critical reception ==
Alan Ranta of PopMatters gave the album 7 stars out of 10, saying: "Regardless of the current state, history will remember Noah23." Addi Stewart of Now said: "You make your own meanings out of this kind of madman genius rap, and Rock Paper Scissors is a winner if you are up for investing a little imagination."

== Track listing ==
No.	Title	Producer(s)	Length
1.	"Hungry" (featuring All Things Invisible)	Mr Soch	3:54
2.	"Pinball" (featuring Gregory Pepper)	Madadam	2:59
3.	"Half Drunk" (featuring Cadence Weapon)	Madadam	1:46
4.	"Crystal Palace" (featuring Wormhole)	Lord Kufu	2:29
5.	"Raw Nukes" (featuring Livestock)	Small Is Beautiful	4:02
6.	"Gaia Bacteria" (featuring Demune)	Playpad Circus	3:27
7.	"Faded" (featuring Ceschi)	Ceschi	4:13
8.	"Elephant March" (featuring Bleubird and Fidget)	Gregory Pepper	3:40
9.	"Toy Story" (featuring The Main)	Gregory Pepper	2:21
10.	"Moon Landing" (featuring Josh Martinez)	Anucongo	2:53
11.	"Rusty Robotz" (featuring Baracuda)	Anucongo	2:40
12.	"Things Get Done" (featuring Modulok)	Debmaster	3:10
13.	"Give It to the People"	Giovanni Marks	1:13
14.	"Ils Persistent" (featuring Delectable)	Eclekt	2:30
15.	"Tragic Comedy" (featuring Epic, K-the-I???, and Sole)	Thur Deephrey	2:56
16.	"Gothic Cathedral" (featuring Hangnail and Homesick)	Naval Aviator	2:27
17.	"Olfactory Memorial"	Zoën	2:23
18.	"Black Ball" (featuring Tykus and Wordburglar)	Fresh Kils	4:07
19.	"Wisdom Teeth" (featuring The Sad Clowns)	The Sad Clowns	2:31
20.	"Dead End Game" (featuring StapleMouth)	Riff Raff	5:18
21.	"True Romance" (featuring Athena and Sankofa)	Factor Chandelier	3:10
22.	"Torn Again" (featuring Jim Guthrie)	Jim Guthrie	2:24
23.	"Fame"	Madadam	3:27
