= Vert (music producer) =

- Birth name: Adam Butler
- Born: 1972 (age 52–53); Portsmouth, England
- Genres: Experimental; Electronica; Jazz
- Occupation(s): Singer-songwriter composer musician
- Instrument(s): Piano, vocals, electronics
- Labels: Sonig
- Website: v-e-r-t.com

Vert (born Adam Butler, 1972, Portsmouth, England) is an English electronic music record producer who has been active since 1996. His music incorporates elements from various electronic genres (earlier drum and bass, subsequently glitch and idm), as well as other genres, such as jazz and hip hop.

His first album, The Köln Konzert, was a remix cover mash-up of Keith Jarrett's original album, The Köln Concert.

Recently he has moved to a more song-based sound, using his own vocals in songs that have similarities with Tom Waits and make use of ragtime piano and big band horns.

== History ==
After a first 12", Broken Breakbeat Bebop on the Bovinyl label in 1996, Vert was picked up by the label Sonig, where he has been ever since. After living in several different cities in the United Kingdom, he moved to Cologne (Köln), Germany in 2001.

== Discography ==
- "Broken Breakbeat Bebop" EP (1996, Bovinyl)
- "Mewantemooseic" EP (1999, Sonig)
- The Köln Konzert CD/LP (2000, Sonig)
- "Moremooseicforme" EP (2001, Sonig)
- Nine Types of Ambiguity CD/LP (2001, Sonig)
- Small Pieces Loosely Joined CD/LP (2003, Sonig)
- Some Beans & an Octopus CD/LP (2006, Sonig)
- New Thing at Novara: Vert remixes the Novara Jazz Festival CD (2008, Sonig)
- The Days Within CD/LP (2015, Shitkatapult)
