= Fry Cook on Venus =

Studio album by Noah23
- Released: March 29, 2011
- Genre: Hip-hop
- Length: 44:30
- Label: Fake Four Inc.
- Producers: Noah23 (exec.), Ceschi (also exec.), Cars & Trains, Factor Chandelier, Gregory Pepper, Madadam, Oskar Ohlson, Rickolus, Skyrider, Zoën

Noah23 chronology
Prefuse 23 (2011)	Fry Cook on Venus (2011)	Gimme Indie Rock (2011)

Professional ratings
Review scores
Source	Rating
Chroniques Electroniques	favorable
Cokemachineglow	69/100
Exclaim!	favorable
Mezzic	7.0/10
UCLA Radio	7.3/10

Fry Cook on Venus is a 2011 studio album by Canadian hip-hop artist Noah23, released on Fake Four Inc. Music videos were produced for "Bright Green Laces" and "Intangible Heart Crescendo".

== Critical reception ==
Vish Khanna of Exclaim! gave the album a favorable review, saying: "Artful as always, Noah23's weirdest album yet finds the gifted MC singing more than ever, but any cheeriness is tempered by the gritty beats and dark soundscapes."

== Track listing ==
No.	Title	Producer(s)	Length
1.	"What It Is"	Oskar Ohlson	2:25
2.	"Bright Green Laces"	Zoën	2:39
3.	"Murder City" (featuring Awol One and Sole)	Ceschi	4:50
4.	"Bed Bugs"	Factor Chandelier	3:07
5.	"Intangible Heart Crescendo"	Madadam	2:46
6.	"Fry Cook on Venus"	Zoën	3:14
7.	"Sea of the Infinite Wave" (featuring Ceschi and Myka 9)	Skyrider	3:31
8.	"Can't Stay Mad"	Ceschi	2:14
9.	"Nuts" (featuring Liz Powell)	Cars & Trains	3:11
10.	"Things to Do" (featuring Rickolus)	Rickolus	4:09
11.	"No Tomorrow"	Madadam	3:04
12.	"Old Dog" (featuring Ghettosocks)	Zoën	3:07
13.	"Time Again"	Zoën	3:32
14.	"When I'm Gone" (featuring Gregory Pepper)	Gregory Pepper	2:41

== Personnel ==
Credits adapted from liner notes.

- Noah23 – vocals
- Oskar Ohlson – production (1)
- Zoën – production (2, 6, 12, 13)
- Awol One – vocals (3)
- Sole – vocals (3)
- Ceschi – production (3, 8), vocals (7)
- Factor Chandelier – production (4)
- Madadam – production (5, 11)
- Myka 9 – vocals (7)
- Skyrider – production (7)
- Liz Powell – vocals (9)
- Cars & Trains – production (9)
- Evan Gordon – guitar (9)
- Rickolus – production (10), vocals (10)
- Ghettosocks – vocals (12)
- Buddy Peace – turntables (12)
- Gregory Pepper – production (14), vocals (14)
- Jeremy Goody – mixing, mastering
- Justin Lovato – artwork
- Michael Crigler – layout
