= Neophyte Phenotype =

Studio album by Noah23
- Released: April 14, 2001
- Recorded: 2000–2001
- Genres: Alternative hip-hop, underground hip-hop
- Length: 72:45
- Label: Plague Language
- Producers: Noah23 (exec.), Orphan (also exec.), 3 Guts, Asterisk Autoharp, Cloev, Evan Gordon, Navigator, Ricky Bionix, Toyeone, Warhol

Noah23 chronology
Cytoplasm Pixel (1999)	''Neophyte Phenotype'' (2001)	Quicksand (2002)

Professional ratings
Review scores
Source	Rating
Exclaim!	(positive)
UKHH	(positive)

Neophyte Phenotype is a 2001 album by Canadian-American alternative hip-hop artist Noah23. It features dense wordplay over drum and bass-influenced beats.

== Track listing ==
No.	Title	Producer(s)	Length
1.	"Mercury Retrograde"	Orphan	4:14
2.	"Insect Network"	Orphan	2:57
3.	"Eucalyptus"	Warhol	1:43
4.	"Spiral Knuckle"	Orphan	3:21
5.	"I Shot Andy Warhol"	3 Guts	4:18
6.	"Tapeworm"	Orphan	3:34
7.	"Bank"	Cloev	2:01
8.	"Nemesis"	Orphan	5:28
9.	"Jellyfish" (featuring Treevortex)	Toyeone	3:27
10.	"Psychic Biters"	Orphan	3:40
11.	"Qualude (Instrumental)"	Orphan	1:09
12.	"Avoid"	Orphan	1:53
13.	"Cellular Automata"	Navigator	4:08
14.	"Harvest"	Orphan	5:22
15.	"Zygote Nanobot"	Warhol	2:12
16.	"Oracle" (featuring Fourth Sight)	Asterisk Autoharp	2:10
17.	"Revolt" (featuring Mofo)	Ricky Bionix	3:31
18.	"Uncitely Growth"	Evan Gordon	3:18
19.	"Kali Yantra"	Orphan	3:39
20.	"Delta Wing Commanders" (featuring KGB72)	3 Guts	2:06
21.	"Tertium Quid"	Toyeone	2:50
22.	"Frequency"	Orphan	1:35
23.	"Hemoglobin"	Orphan	4:08

== See also ==
- 2001 in hip hop music
