= Modulok (rapper) =

- Also known as: Moe, Mofo
- Born: Mohammad Gonsalves; 1979 (age 46–47)
- Origin: East York, Ontario, Canada
- Genres: Underground hip hop Alternative hip hop
- Occupation: Rapper
- Years active: 2001–present
- Labels: Takaba; Urbnet Records; Bare Records; Seize the Capital! Fishgang
- Website: Official Facebook

Mohammad Gonsalves, better known by his stage name Modulok, is a rapper based in East York, Ontario.

== Discography ==
Modulok

- Two Cities (Bare Records, 2008) (with Bare Beats)
- Cities and Years (Takaba, 2009)
- You Look So Tragic (Takaba, 2012)

Red Ants (Modulok with Vincent Price)

- Phobos Deimos (Seize the Capital!, 2005)
- Omega Point (Urbnet Records, 2008)

EPs

- Hydra (Fishgang, 2014) (with Baracuda)

Singles

- "The Jungle Made of Glass / Secret Island" (Seize the Capital!, 2007)

Guest appearances

- Noah23 - "Revolt" from Neophyte Phenotype (2001)
- Baracuda - "Mutagen" from Tetragammoth (2002)
- Noah23 - "Vest" from Tau Ceti (2003)
- Noah23 - "Dead Owl Skunk" from Jupiter Sajitarius (2004)
- Baracuda - "Pecan Dirty Rice" from Knucklebone (2008)
- Noah23 - "Things Get Done" from Rock Paper Scissors (2008)
- Baracuda - "Pecan Dirty Rice Remix", "Party Crashers" & "Taste" from Do Tell (2009)
- Plague Language Fam - "Fast Machine & Dirty Women" from Instant Classic (2009)
- Noah23 - "Keep My Name Off Ya Lips" (2013)
