= Jupiter Sajitarius =

Studio album by Noah23
- Released: November 2, 2004
- Recorded: 2003–2004
- Genre: Alternative hip hop Underground hip hop
- Length: 59:25
- Label: 2nd Rec
- Producer: Noah23 (exec.), Orphan (exec.), Bishop Orange, King Champion, Madadam, Naval Aviator, Paul Fava, Varick Pyr

Noah23 chronology
The Train Rawbers (2004)	''Jupiter Sajitarius'' (2004)	Amalthea Magnetosphere (2006)

Professional ratings
Review scores
Source	Rating
Coke Machine Glow	link

Jupiter Sajitarius is a 2004 album by Canadian-American alternative hip hop artist Noah23. It possesses "a remarkable variety of both production and compositions," according to MiC Music Portal. The majority of the album's production was handled by Orphan, and marked the final collaboration between the two, prior to Orphan's departure from Plague Language and the formation of Blue Sky Black Death.

The track "Chicken Pox" was released as a 10" single in 2004, featuring a remix entitled "Chicken Soup", produced by Orphan with a guest appearance from Ceschi, and a B-side entitled "Sigma Octantis", produced by Savillion. "Chicken Soup" was later included on the 2007 compilation Cameo Therapy, while "Sigma Octantis" appeared on 2008's Upside Down Bluejay.

== Track listing ==
No.	Title	Producer(s)	Length
1.	"Lizard Lion Eagle"	Orphan	3:36
2.	"Photo Soul Decay"	Bishop Orange	2:59
3.	"Old Earth"	Naval Aviator	2:45
4.	"As Below So Above"	Orphan	3:45
5.	"Chicken Pox"	Orphan	4:21
6.	"Godhead Omlet"	Orphan	3:02
7.	"Freelance Zenarchist"	Orphan	4:20
8.	"Scream" (featuring Ceschi)	Orphan	4:31
9.	"Quicksilver"	Orphan	2:38
10.	"Camera Shy"	Madadam	3:52
11.	"Nova Toast"	Orphan	4:04
12.	"Marshes"	Orphan	3:31
13.	"Dead Owl Skunk" (featuring Modulok)	King Champion	3:33
14.	"Turtle Bear"	Paul Fava	4:15
15.	"Zapata Physicians" (featuring Livestock)	Naval Aviator	4:39
16.	"Petit Mort"	Varick Pyr	3:34

== "Chicken Pox" 10" track listing ==
No.	Title	Producer(s)	Length
1.	"Chicken Pox"	Orphan	4:21
2.	"Chicken Pox (Instrumental)"	Orphan	4:21
3.	"Chicken Soup" (featuring Ceschi)	Orphan	3:14
4.	"Sigma Octantis"	Savillion	1:59
5.	"Sigma Octantis (Instrumental)"	Savillion	1:59

== See also ==
- 2004 in hip hop music
