= Zucchini Drive =

Alternative music band

- Genres: Alternative; Indie hip hop
- Years active: 2003–present
- Labels: Marathon of Dope, 2nd Records, Hue Records Japan
- Members: Tom De Geeter; Marcus Graap; Pieter Blancke
- Website: www.marathonofdope.com

Zucchini Drive is an alternative trio based in Kortrijk, Belgium. It consists of producers Tom De Geeter, Marcus Graap and Pieter Blancke. The band is currently signed to Marathon of Dope.

== Discography ==
=== Albums ===
- Vikings and Waffles (CD - 2003)
- Being Kurtwood (CD/LP - 2006)
- Being Kurtwood (CD Japanese Version - 2006)
- Goodyear Television Playhouse (CD - 2007)
- Goodyear Television Playhouse (CD Japanese Version - 2007)
- Shotgun Rules (Digital - 2009)
- Howler Music (Digital - 2011)
- Goodyear Television Playhouse Reissue (Digital - 2012)
- No Food but Lots of Weapons (CD/LP - 2012)

=== Singles ===
- "Easy Tiger" (12inch - 2006)

=== Compilation appearances ===
- "Offcuts" on Calderas of Mind (2006)
- "Easy Tiger Remix" on En Direct de la Côte (2007)
- "90min Maxell" on Goose Bump 4.0 (2010)
