= Quicksand (Noah23 album) =

Studio album by Noah23
- Released: May 18, 2002
- Recorded: 2001–2002
- Genres: Alternative hip-hop, underground hip-hop
- Length: 54:06
- Labels: Plague Language, 2nd Rec
- Producers: Noah23 (exec.), Lovely, Naval Aviator, Ognihs, Orphan, Sseleman, Troubadour, Warhol

Noah23 chronology
Neophyte Phenotype (2001)	''Quicksand'' (2002)	Tau Ceti (2003)

Professional ratings
Review scores
Source	Rating
AllMusic	link
Exclaim!	(Positive) link
Moving Hands	link
No Ripcord	link
UKHH	(Positive) link
Urban Smarts	(64/100) link
Urbnet	(Positive) link

Quicksand is a 2002 album by Canadian-American alternative hip-hop artist Noah23. Most of the album's production was handled by Orphan, the Plague Language collective's most prolific producer at the time.

The track "Crypto Sporidian" was released as a split single with the track "Deadly Rays" from fellow Plague Language member Baracuda's debut album Tetragammoth. Both tracks were produced by Orphan.

== Critical reception ==
AllMusic gave the album a rating of 4 out of 5 stars. Exclaim! wrote that the album "can rock the parties ("Digestive Enzymes"), the dance floors ("Resistance"), headphones ("Hourglass") and the art fags ("The Fall") all while maintaining a cohesive sound."

== Track listing ==
No.	Title	Producer(s)	Length
1.	"Saw Palmetto"	Warhol	3:04
2.	"Volapuk"	Orphan	3:07
3.	"Crypto Sporidian"	Orphan	4:35
4.	"Octave"	Ognihs	3:01
5.	"Learning Curve"	Orphan	3:14
6.	"Resistance"	Troubadour	3:13
7.	"Hourglass" (featuring Distant Relatives)	Orphan	3:39
8.	"Banded Hairstreak"	Orphan	2:06
9.	"Digestive Enzymes"	Lovely	2:35
10.	"Nocturnal"	Orphan	3:43
11.	"Imhotep"	Orphan	4:12
12.	"Guelph" (featuring Baracuda)	Warhol	2:42
13.	"Zenith Dub"	Sseleman	2:49
14.	"Julia Set"	Orphan	3:01
15.	"The Fall"	Naval Aviator	9:05

== See also ==
- 2002 in hip hop music
