= Gregory Pepper =

Canadian musician

- Born: Gregory Andre Perets
- Origin: Guelph, Ontario, Canada
- Genres: Indie pop, alternative hip-hop
- Occupations: Singer, producer
- Years active: 2005–present
- Label: Fake Four Inc.
- Website: camppepper.com

Gregory Pepper, born Gregory Andre Perets, is a musician based in Guelph, Ontario and signed to Fake Four Inc.

== Discography ==
=== Albums ===
- Gregory Pepper & His Problems (2007)
- With Trumpets Flaring (2009)
- The Great Depression (2010) (with Factor Chandelier, as Common Grackle)
- The Great Repression (2011) (as Common Grackle)
- Escape From Crystal Skull Mountain (2012)
- Big Huge Truck (2013) (with Madadam)
- CHORUS! CHORUS! CHORUS! (2015)
- Black Metal Demo Tape (2017)
- I Know Now Why You Cry (2020)
- Old Dog New Tricks Who This (2021) (as Common Grackle)
- No Thanks (2023)
- Estate Sale (2023)
- No More Skulls (2025)

=== EPs ===
- How the Sick May Help Themselves (2005) (with The Dymaxions)
- My Bad EP (2014)
- GHOST (2016)
- ツンデレ (Tsundere) (2018)
- Under a Heather Moon (2020)

=== Podcasts ===
- Pep Talk! Episode 1 (2011)
- Pep Talk! Episode 2: Rejection (2012)
- Pep Talk! Episode 3: Return to Crystal Skull Mountain (2013)
- Pep Talk! Episode 4: Track (2013)

=== Guest appearances ===
- Noah23 – "Pinball" from Rock Paper Scissors (2008)
- Noah23 – "House on Wheels" from Upside Down Bluejay (2008)
- Awol One & Factor Chandelier – "Back Then" from Owl Hours (2009)
- Factor – "Missed the Train" from Lawson Graham (2010)
- Noah23 – "When I'm Gone" from Fry Cook on Venus (2011)
- Sixo – "Daggers" from Tracking Perception EP (2012)
- Sixo – "Lord of the Flies" from Free Floating Rationales (2012)
- Factor – "Give Up" from Woke Up Alone (2013)

=== Production credits ===
- Noah23 – "Elephant March" & "Toy Story" from Rock Paper Scissors (2008)
- Noah23 – "House on Wheels" from Upside Down Bluejay (2008)
- Noah23 – "When I'm Gone" from Fry Cook on Venus (2011)
- The Main – all tracks on Clamnesia (2011)

== See also ==
- Fake Four Inc.
- Canadian hip-hop
