= Baracuda (rapper) =

- Also known as: Baracuda72; Baracuda Young Fish; KGB72
- Born: Graham Troyer; February 24, 1983 (age 43); Guelph, Ontario, Canada
- Genres: Underground hip hop, alternative hip hop
- Occupation: Rapper
- Years active: 2000–present
- Labels: Plague Language; Fishgang; Legendary Entertainment; Takaba; Swann Flu
- Formerly of: Plague Language
- Website: Baracuda on Facebook

Graham Troyer (born February 24, 1983), better known by his stage name Baracuda (formerly Baracuda72), is a Canadian rapper from Guelph, Ontario, currently based in Toronto.

== Rap career ==
Baracuda was an original member of the Plague Language collective founded by Noah23 and Orphan. Beginning in 2001 he collaborated with Noah23 under the name Bourgeois Cyborgs. They released one self-titled album in 2008. The duo broke up in 2012 and Baracuda is no longer affiliated with Plague Language.

== Discography ==
Solo albums

- Tetragammoth (Plague Language, 2002)
- Knucklebone (Legendary Entertainment, 2008) (produced by Madadam)

Collaboration albums

- Bourgeois Cyborgs (Legendary Entertainment, 2008) (with Noah23, as Bourgeois Cyborgs)
- Shut the Front Door (Fishgang, 2018) (with Killz)

EPs

- Monster Blood (2011) (with Jay the Kidd)
- Hydra (Fishgang, 2014) (with Modulok)
- Swann vs. Baracuda EP (Swann Flu, 2015) (with Swann)

Mixtapes

- Do Tell (Plague Language, 2009)
- Instant Classic (Plague Language, 2009) (with Plague Language Fam)
- We in the Building Mixtape (Fishgang, 2013) (with Killz)
- Diamonds on My Cereal (Fishgang, 2013)

Compilations

- Plague Language Compilation (Plague Language, 2009) (with Plague Language)

Guest appearances

- Noah23 - "Delta Wing Commanders" from Neophyte Phenotype (2001)
- Noah23 - "Guelph" from Quicksand (2002)
- Noah23 - "Twist of Fate", "Mechanical Bull" & "Data Hooks" from Mitochondrial Blues (2004)
- Livestock & Madadam - "Bomb Worship" from Walk Down the Street (2007)
- The Weird Apples - "The Great Nostalgia" from The Big Crunch (2008)
- Normal Oranges - "Christmas Fix" from $5 Mic (2008)
- Noah23 - "Rusty Robotz" from Rock Paper Scissors (2008)
- Noah23 - "Absolute Mystery" from Noah23 / Playpad Circus (2010)
- Jon Brando - "No Bummer Cut" from No Laptop Bummer Cut (2010)
- Noah23 - "Air Guitar" from Heart of Rock (2010)
- Notorious BEN - "Superhero" from Interdimensional Surfboard (2010)
- Noah23 - "Chains", "Off the Hook", "Crush", "Doom Freestyle" & "Westbound Freestyle" from Pirate Utopias (77 Lost Scrolls) (2011)
- Noah23 & Krem - "Out of Order" from The Terminal Illness EP (2011)
- Noah23 - "Enter the Void" from Occult Trill II: The Sun Rewinds (2011)
- Mohammad Escrow - "Worst Day Ever" & "Take Time" from Escrow Season (2012)
- Noah23 - "Warlocks" from Noah23 for Dummies (2012)
- Spz Chaote - "Rap Tyrants" from The Final Secret of the Illuminati (2012)
- Ceschi - "Work Song" from Forgotten Forever (2014)
- Noah23 - "Nuclear Heat" from Peacock Angel (2015)

== See also ==
- Plague Language
- Canadian hip hop
