= Noah23 =

Canadian-American hip hop artist

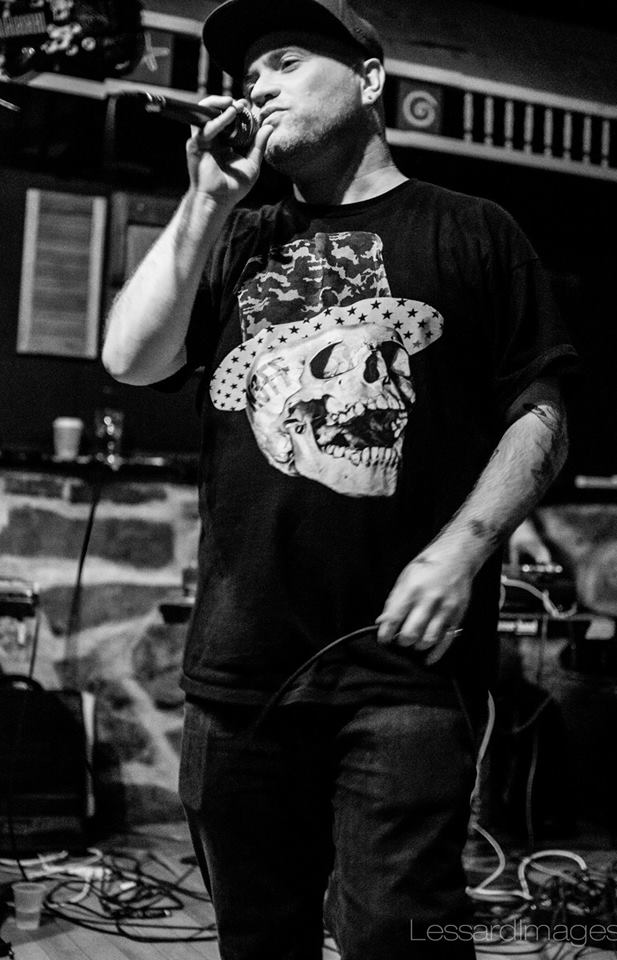
- April 27, 2014 - Rainbow Bistro - Ottawa, Ontario, Canada

Background information
- Also known as: Warhol; Yukon Dawn; SabrToof
- Born: Noah Raymond Brickley; February 10, 1978 (age 48); Natchez, Mississippi, US
- Origin: Guelph, Ontario, Canada
- Genre: Hip-hop
- Occupations: Rapper, producer
- Years active: 1997–present
- Labels: Plague Language (2000–present); Legendary Entertainment (2002–present); 2nd Rec (2003–2007); Fake Four Inc. (2009–2011); Northstar Imprint (2003–2004); Vermin Street (2010); Candy Drips (2014–present)
- Formerly of: CRUNK23
- Website: noah23.tumblr.com

Noah Raymond Brickley (born February 10, 1978), better known by his stage name Noah23, is a Canadian-American hip-hop artist from Guelph, Ontario. He is co-founder of the Plague Language collective and record label, and has been described as "one of Canada's best, most underrated MCs".

== Career ==
Noah Raymond Brickley was born in 1978 in Natchez, Mississippi and moved to Guelph, Ontario at the age of 4. He began rapping in the early 1990s and released his first album, originally titled Plague Language, in 1999. This album, initially released on cassette, was remastered and released on CD in 2006 under the name Cytoplasm Pixel.

In the late 1990s, Noah23 started the record label Plague Language with producer Orphan (real name Kingston Maguire, who went on to become one half of production duo Blue Sky Black Death). In the early 2000s the Plague Language label released music from artists such as Baracuda, Livestock, Orko the Sycotik Alien, Penny, The Main, and Madadam. In 2004, following the departure of Orphan, the label entered into a period of indefinite hiatus. Plague Language continues to exist, however, as both an imprint on associated Canadian label Legendary Entertainment and as a loose collective of Guelph-based hip-hop artists.

Noah23 is involved with side projects associated with Plague Language, including Crunk23, Famous Playaz, The Weird Apples, and Bourgeois Cyborgs. He has also collaborated with other artists, such as Lil B The Based God, Cadence Weapon, Josh Martinez, K-the-I???, Sole, Jim Guthrie, Myka 9, Ceschi, Awol One, Liz Powell of Land of Talk, Ghettosocks, Kingpin Skinny Pimp, Gregory Pepper, and Buck 65.

He has performed with Kool Keith, Busdriver, Subtitle, Islands, Matisyahu, and many more, including Astronautalis, Clouddead, Eternia, Grand Buffet, Radioinactive, The Constantines, Plastic Little, Modulok, TheSaurus, Shabba D, DJ Scientist, Krinjah, Shad, and Swollen Members.

On May 3, 2011, Noah23 announced that he would retire from music at the end of the year. Throughout the first half of 2012 he expressed uncertainty over the possibility of his return to music. On July 31, 2012, he stated he was considering returning to music in the new year, and on August 4 he officially announced he would begin releasing new material in 2013.

=== Post-hiatus: 2012-present ===
Noah23's first post-hiatus album, titled Wingfoot, was released for download on December 21, 2012. On February 10, 2013, Noah23 released the EP Tropical Fruit, featuring production by Pictureplane. On May 23, he released the collaborative album Lotus Deities, which features an array of guest appearances, and includes a remix of "Comin' Home" by City and Colour. On August 20, he released the third and final entry in the Occult Trill series, subtitled Blast Master Therion. While the first two entries in the series are mixtapes, this release is considered an "official album". On September 3, he released the alternative folk EP Husk under his Yukon Dawn moniker. The EP is dedicated to Noah23's mother for her sixtieth birthday. On October 9, he released a Ween-themed mixtape titled Ween x Noah23 (Browntape). On January 31, 2014, Noah23 released a collaborative EP with producer Horse Head, titled Delicate Genius, On February 23, he released a compilation of guest appearances, singles and miscellaneous tracks titled Rare Gems. On July 23, he released a collaborative album with producer David Klopek titled Light Years, which he described as a "golden era", "boom bap"-style record, likening its sound to that of his earlier albums Jupiter Sajitarius and Crab Nebula, and to the music of Kool Keith, MF Doom and Organized Konfusion. On August 23, he released a trap-influenced solo album, titled Street Astrology. On October 31, he released a Halloween-themed EP titled Blood, produced by Party Trash. On January 23, 2015, he released a full-length collaboration with production duo Blown, titled Noah23 x Blown, exploring a range of styles "from based to metal to reggae to hyphy to boom bap". Noah23 x Blown and the Blood EP were released on Nashville-based label Candy Drips. On May 23, 2015, Noah23 released his first double-album, titled Peacock Angel. As of October 2015, he is recording a new solo album titled Aquarian Alien, after which he will record a fifth collaboration with Crunk Chris, under their CRUNK23 moniker, for release in 2016.

== Style ==
Noah23's lyrical style has been described as "a mix of biological terms, technological expressions, esoteric topics, scientific fractions and traditional 'rap writing'", the repetitive use of which is intended "to weave and enlarge a meta-layered web of correlative links and references". He is influenced by the theory of memetics, which he describes as "the study of ideas and language as replicating biological entities that live in the host organism which is the mind". Brickley has described his work as being "like a giant self referential body of thought" characterised by "motif and repetition".

== Selected discography ==
- Neophyte Phenotype (2001)
- Quicksand (2002)
- Jupiter Sajitarius (2004)
- Clout (2006)
- Rock Paper Scissors (2008)
- Crab Nebula (2009)
- Fry Cook on Venus (2011)
- Wingfoot (2012)
- Lotus Deities (2013)
- Street Astrology (2014)
- Peacock Angel (2015)
- Discordian Pope (2016)
- Ikosi Tria (2023)

== See also ==
- Fake Four Inc.
- Canadian hip-hop
