= List of songs recorded by Swollen Members =

The following is a list of recorded songs by Canadian rap group Swollen Members.

Song title	Year	Album	Length	Other performer(s)	Producer(s)
"Act On It"	2002	Monsters in the Closet	3:36	—N/a	Rob the Viking
"Adrenaline"	2003	Heavy	4:06	—N/a	Nucleus
"Against All Odds"	2011	1997	4:21	—N/a	Rob the Viking
"Agent Orange"	2011	Monsters II	4:05	—N/a	DJ Science
"All Night"	2003	Heavy	3:25	—N/a	The Edgecrusher
"Almost Famous"	2013	Beautiful Death Machine	4:01	—N/a	Rob the Viking
"Ambush"/"Sensational Breed"	2003	Heavy	10:34	Son Doobie	Rob the Viking
"Angel of Death"	2014	Brand New Day	2:22	—N/a	C-Lance, Rob the Viking
"Anthrax Island"	2001	Bad Dreams	2:30	—N/a	Nucleus
"Artillery"	2007	Vicious Delicious	4:28	Infected Mushroom	Infected Mushroom
"Assault + Battery"	1999	Balance	2:53	—N/a	Zodak
"Bad Dreams"	2001	Bad Dreams	3:50	—N/a	The Alchemist
"Bang Bang"	2009	Armed to the Teeth	7:07	Tre Nyce, Young Kazh	Rob the Viking
"Battle Axe Exclusive"	2002	Monsters in the Closet	2:34	—N/a	Zodak
"Battle Axe Experiment"	1999	Balance	3:07	Evidence	Zodak
"Bax War"	2013	Beautiful Death Machine	3:45	—N/a	C-Lance
"Black Magic"	2006	Black Magic	3:58	DJ Swamp	Rob the Viking
"Blackout"	2006	Black Magic	1:47	—N/a	DJ Kemo, Rob the Viking
"Bless + Destroy"	1999	Balance	3:20	—N/a	Zodak
"Block Party"	2003	Heavy	3:37	—N/a	Nucleus
"Blood Sport"	2014	Brand New Day	2:54	—N/a	Rob the Viking
"Bollywood Chick"	2009	Armed to the Teeth	8:02	Tech N9ne, Tre Nyce	Rob the Viking, Karim Goldan
"Bottle Rocket"	1999	Balance	3:48	Divine Styler, Everlast, Evidence	Evidence
"Bottom Line"	2003	Heavy	3:48	—N/a	Rob the Viking
"Brace Yourself"	2011	1997	3:25	—N/a	Rob the Viking
"Brand New Day"	2014	Brand New Day	3:41	—N/a	Rob the Viking
"Breath"	2002	Monsters in the Closet	3:50	Nelly Furtado	Rob the Viking
"Bring It Home"	2001	Bad Dreams and Monsters in the Closet	4:17	Moka Only	Rob the Viking
"Bring Me Down" (Swollen Mix)	2011	Dagger Mouth	4:28	Saigon	Just Blaze, Rob the Viking
"Broken Mirror"	2011	Monsters II	3:14	—N/a	Rob the Viking
"Brothers"	2006	Black Magic	3:51	—N/a	Double Dragon
"Brutal Elaborate"	2011	Monsters II	3:56	—N/a	Rob the Viking
"Burn It Down"	2003	Heavy	3:16	—N/a	Nucleus
"Burns and Scars"	2001	Bad Dreams	4:05	Son Doobie	Rob the Viking
"Camouflage"	2001	Bad Dreams	2:31	DJ Revolution	Evidence
"Canada 3000"	2011	1997	5:13	Dilated Peoples	Rob the Viking
"The Capitol"	2002	Monsters in the Closet	1:51	—N/a	Rob the Viking
"Certified Dope"	2009	Armed to the Teeth	5:17	—N/a	Rob the Viking
"Chemical Imbalance"	2011	Dagger Mouth	2:07	—N/a	Rob the Viking
"Circuit Breaker"	1999	Balance	3:18	—N/a	The Alchemist
"Cock Blocker"	2014	Brand New Day	4:20	—N/a	C-Lance, Rob the Viking
"Cold Sweat"	2014	Brand New Day	3:15	—N/a	C-Lance, Rob the Viking
"Colossal Beasts"	2013	Beautiful Death Machine	3:54	Esoteric, Celph Titled, Apathy	C-Lance
"Committed"	1999	Balance	2:57	Son Doobie	Kemo
"Concentrate"	2003	Heavy	3:31	—N/a	Nucleus
"Concerto"	2009	Armed to the Teeth	3:39	—N/a	Rob the Viking
"Consumption"	1999	Balance	4:50	Aceyalone	Evidence
"Counter Parts"	1999	Balance	4:33	Iriscience, Evidence	Evidence
"Creatures of Evil"	2014	Brand New Day	2:25	—N/a	C-Lance, Rob the Viking
"Cross Fire"	2009	Armed to the Teeth	4:08	Talib Kweli	Metty the Dert Merchant, Rob the Viking
"Crunch"	2002	Monsters in the Closet	2:21	—N/a	Paul Nice
"Dark Clouds"	2006	Black Magic	4:55	Evidence	Evidence
"Dark Riders"	2001	Bad Dreams	3:20	Buc Fifty	The Alchemist
"Death to You"	2013	Beautiful Death Machine	4:31	Ill Bill, Slaine, Vinnie Paz	C-Lance
"Death Warrant"	2013	Beautiful Death Machine	3:58	—N/a	C-Lance
"Deep End"	2001	Bad Dreams	3:25	—N/a	Seanski
"Devil"	2011	Dagger Mouth	3:30	—N/a	Rob the Viking
"The Difference"	2013	Beautiful Death Machine	3:37	—N/a	Rob the Viking
"Do or Die"	2011	Dagger Mouth	3:27	—N/a	Rob the Viking
"Don't Know Why"	2003	Heavy	4:05	Abstract Rude	Moka Only, Rob the Viking
"Dream Chaser"	2011	Monsters II	4:06	—N/a	Rob the Viking
"Dumb"	2009	Armed to the Teeth	5:51	Everlast, Slaine, Tre Nyce	Rob the Viking
"Dynamite"	2006	Black Magic	3:03	Mr. Vegas	Vago, DJ Kemo (co.)
"Electric Chair"	2011	Dagger Mouth	4:13	—N/a	Rob the Viking
"Endangered Species"	2011	1997	5:01	Tony da Skitzo, Mr. Brady, Evidence	Rob the Viking
"English Breakfast"	2002	Monsters in the Closet	2:23	—N/a	DJ Vadim
"Ether"	2011	1997	2:43	—N/a	Rob the Viking
"Execution"	2011	Monsters II	5:06	Krondon, Phil the Agony, Opio, A-Plus	Rob the Viking
"Faces of Death"	2011	1997	3:18	—N/a	Rob the Viking
"Falling Down"	2013	A New Nightmare	4:20	Twiztid	
"Fear"	2013	Beautiful Death Machine	3:43	Snak the Ripper	C-Lance
"Fibreglass"	2011	1997	3:16	—N/a	Rob the Viking
"Field of Dreams"	2011	1997	2:31	—N/a	Rob the Viking
"Fire"	2011	Dagger Mouth	2:33	—N/a	Rob the Viking
"Flyest"	2009	Armed to the Teeth	5:40	Tre Nyce	Rob the Viking, Tre Nyce
"Freak Fantastic"	2002	Monsters in the Closet	3:13	—N/a	DJ Science, Rob the Viking, Roger Swan
"Fresh Air"	2011	Dagger Mouth	3:28	—N/a	Rob the Viking
"Front Street"	1999	Balance	3:36	—N/a	The Alchemist
"Fuel Injected"	2001	Bad Dreams	3:31	Moka Only	DJ Kemo, Concise
"Fuel Injected" (Remix)	2002	Monsters in the Closet	3:50	Saukrates	Saukrates
"Full Contact"	2001	Bad Dreams	4:09	Evidence, Chali 2na	Evidence
"Funeral March"	2009	Armed to the Teeth	5:42	Saafir, Barbie Hatch	Rob the Viking, Roger Swan, Russ Kline
"Go to Sleep"	2006	Black Magic	4:32	Barbie Hatch	Squeak E. Clean, Corn Gang (co.)
"Grind"	2006	Black Magic	3:15	Moka Only	Rob the Viking
"Ground Breaking"	1999	Balance	3:55	—N/a	Kool DJ E.Q.
"Heart"	2006	Black Magic	3:06	—N/a	Rob the Viking
"Heartland"	2011	Monsters II	3:31	—N/a	Rob the Viking
"Heat"	2003	Heavy	4:19	—N/a	Evidence
"Heavy Thinkers"	2002	Monsters in the Closet	2:28	—N/a	Evidence
"Here We Come"	2009	Armed to the Teeth	4:50	—N/a	Rob the Viking
"High Road"	2001	Bad Dreams	4:20	—N/a	Rob the Viking
"Honor Combat"	2011	Monsters II	1:58	—N/a	Rob the Viking
"Horrified Nights"	1999	Balance	4:03	—N/a	The Alchemist
"House of Sin"	2011	Dagger Mouth	3:04	—N/a	Rob the Viking
"Inception"	2013	Beautiful Death Machine	4:19	—N/a	Aspect
"Jackson Pollock"	2014	Brand New Day	2:19	DJ Makeway	Rob the Viking
"Jacques Cousteau"	2014	Brand New Day	3:21	DJ Makeway	Rob the Viking
"Juggernaut"	2013	Beautiful Death Machine	3:28	—N/a	Rob the Viking
"Killing Spree"	2001	Bad Dreams	2:38	—N/a	Nucleus
"King of Diamonds"	2013	Beautiful Death Machine	3:03	—N/a	Rob the Viking
"Kyla"	2009	Armed to the Teeth	5:27	—N/a	Rob the Viking
"Lady Venom"	1999	Balance	4:15	—N/a	Paul Nice
"Left Field"	1999	Balance	5:16	Del tha Funkee Homosapien, Unicorn	Del tha Funkee Homosapien
"Lonely One"	2009	Armed to the Teeth	5:07	—N/a	DJ Kemo, Roger Swan
"Long Way Down"	2002	Monsters in the Closet	3:29	—N/a	Rob the Viking, Roger Swan, Chris Guy
"Lost In the Music"	2012	Mike E. Clark's Extra Pop Emporium	4:28	Insane Clown Posse	Mike E. Clark
"Massacre"	2006	Black Magic	3:41	—N/a	Rob the Viking, Roger Swan (co.)
"Mean Streets"	2011	Monsters II	3:29	Souls of Mischief	Rob the Viking, Double Dragon
"Mechanical"	2011	Monsters II	3:51	DJ Swamp	Rob the Viking, DJ Swamp
"Meltdown"	2009	Armed to the Teeth	4:53	—N/a	Rob the Viking
"Members Only"	2002	Monsters in the Closet	2:23	—N/a	Joey Chavez
"Mercenary"	2013	Beautiful Death Machine	2:26	—N/a	Rob the Viking
"Moonshine"	2011	Dagger Mouth	3:32	—N/a	Rob the Viking
"Mr. Impossible"	2011	Dagger Mouth	2:36	—N/a	Rob the Viking
"My Advice"	2011	1997	3:54	—N/a	Rob the Viking
"My Life"	2009	Armed to the Teeth	7:54	—N/a	Rob the Viking
"Nemesis"	2014	Brand New Day	1:59	—N/a	Rob the Viking
"New Details"	2002	Monsters in the Closet	3:33	—N/a	Mark B
"Night Vision"	2011	Dagger Mouth	3:41	—N/a	Rob the Viking
"Northern Lights"	2002	Monsters in the Closet	4:03	—N/a	Joey Chavez
"Odd Goblins"	2014	Brand New Day	3:05	—N/a	Rob the Viking
"One Big Trip"	2002	—N/a	5:07	—N/a	Rob the Viking
"Original West Coast"	2011	1997	2:35	—N/a	Rob the Viking
"Out of Range"	1999	Balance	4:01	—N/a	Zodak
"Paradise Lost"	2011	1997	5:18	Tony da Skitzo, Mix Master Mike, Mr. Brady	Rob the Viking
"Paranoia"	2003	Heavy	4:02	—N/a	Rob the Viking
"Park Bench"	2014	Brand New Day	3:01	—N/a	Rob the Viking
"Perfect Storm"	2011	Monsters II	4:21	Rakaa Iriscience	Evidence
"Poker Face"	2001	Bad Dreams	4:20	Buc Fifty	Rob the Viking
"Pornstar"	2009	Armed to the Teeth	5:41	Tre Nyce	Rob the Viking
"Post Rigormortis"	2011	1997	2:05	—N/a	Rob the Viking
"Power"	2014	Brand New Day	3:20	—N/a	Rob the Viking
"The Predator"	2011	Dagger Mouth	3:42	—N/a	Rob the Viking
"Pressure"	2006	Black Magic	3:23	—N/a	DJ Kemo
"Prisoner of Doom"	2006	Black Magic	4:12	—N/a	Rob the Viking, Roger Swan, Metty the Dert Merchant (co.)
"Put Me On"	2006	Black Magic	4:05	Everlast, Moka Only	Evidence
"Real P.I."	2009	Armed to the Teeth	8:19	Tre Nyce, Glasses Malone	Karim Goldan
"Reclaim the Throne"	2009	Armed to the Teeth	5:18	Tre Nyce	Rob the Viking
"Red Dragon"	2002	Monsters in the Closet and Armed to the Teeth	3:01	Moka Only	Moka Only
"The Reflection"	2001	Bad Dreams	1:58	—N/a	Rob the Viking
"Remember the Name"	2003	Heavy	5:07	—N/a	Evidence
"River Monster"	2013	Beautiful Death Machine	4:17	—N/a	C-Lance
"Rockapella"	2002	Monsters in the Closet	0:52	—N/a	Roger Swan
"Roller Coaster"	2011	1997	4:31	—N/a	Rob the Viking
"RPM"	2001	Bad Dreams	4:01	Iriscience, DJ Babu	Nucleus
"S+M On the Rocks"	1999	Balance	3:36	—N/a	Joey Chavez
"Shatterproof"	2011	1997	3:47	—N/a	Rob the Viking
"The Shining"	2011	Dagger Mouth	4:07	—N/a	Rob the Viking
"Sinful Bliss"	1999	Balance	4:17	—N/a	Evidence
"Sinister"	2006	Black Magic	4:19	Sick Jacken	Rob the Viking, Roger Swan (co.)
"Snake Bite"	2001	Bad Dreams	3:43	Rattlesnake Jones, Chris Guy	Rob the Viking, Roger Swan
"So Deadly"	2006	Black Magic	3:58	Evidence	Evidence
"Sound Burial"	2011	Monsters II	3:41	—N/a	Rob the Viking
"Steppin' Thru"	2002	Monsters in the Closet	3:25	—N/a	Kemo
"Still Kill"	2014	Brand New Day	3:23	—N/a	Rob the Viking
"Strength"	1999	Balance	2:52	—N/a	The Alchemist
"Sun Burn"	2011	1997	3:09	Mix Master Mike	Rob the Viking
"Supernova"	2014	Brand New Day	3:06	DJ Revolution	Rob the Viking
"Swamp Water"	2006	Black Magic	3:35	Phil da Agony, Planet Asia, DJ Revolution	Evidence
"Take It Back"	2001	Bad Dreams	3:41	DJ Revolution	Rob the Viking
"Temptation"	2002	Monsters in the Closet	2:38	—N/a	Joey Chavez
"Therapy"	2003	Heavy	3:49	—N/a	Rob the Viking
"Too Hot"	2006	Black Magic	3:33	DJ Babu	Rob the Viking
"Torture"	2006	Black Magic	3:37	Casual, DJ Revolution	Rob the Viking
"Total Package"	2001	Bad Dreams	3:19	Planet Asia, DJ Revolution	Evidence
"Trust"	2011	Monsters II	3:22	—N/a	Nucleus, Rob the Viking
"Valentine's Day Massacre"	1999	Balance	3:55	Nous, Saafir, Thirdrail Vic	Kemo
"Ventilate"	2001	Bad Dreams	3:56	DJ Babu	Joey Chavez
"War Money"	2011	Dagger Mouth	4:17	—N/a	Rob the Viking
"Warrior"	2009	Armed to the Teeth	4:50	Tre Nyce, Young Kazh	Rob the Viking
"Watch This"	2003	Heavy	3:43	—N/a	Rob the Viking
"Weight"	2006	Black Magic	3:47	Ghostface Killah, The Alchemist	The Alchemist
"White Python/Black Tarantula/Sound of the Drum"	2011	Dagger Mouth	4:43	—N/a	Rob the Viking
"Zenith"	2002	Monsters in the Closet	2:36	—N/a	Zodak
