= Greatest Hits: Ten Years of Turmoil =

Greatest hits album by Swollen Members
- Released: March 16, 2010
- Recorded: 1997–2009
- Genre: Hip-hop
- Length: 64:36
- Labels: Battle Axe Records; Suburban Noize Records
- Producers: Kemo, Rob the Viking, Evidence, Seanski, Paul Nice, The Alchemist

Greatest Hits: Ten Years of Turmoil is a greatest hits album by the Canadian hip-hop group Swollen Members, released on March 16, 2010, by Battle Axe Records and Suburban Noize Records. The album features eighteen tracks from the group's first six albums, and includes a bonus DVD with ten music videos. In 2021, the album was released on vinyl for Record Store Day.

== Critical reception ==
Professional ratings
Review scores
Source	Rating
AllMusic	3.5/5 stars
RapReviews	7/10

Alex Henderson of AllMusic stated Many of "Swollen Members' best-known recordings are included, which is not to say that long-time fans won't find some omissions to complain about."

Neil Acharya of Exclaim said "a large portion of the tracks are from Black Magic" and noted the bonus DVD "focuses on Madchild's battle with addiction to Percocet and OxyContin, as well as introduces people to the newest Battle Axe warrior: Tre Nyce".

Emanuel Wallace of RapReviews said "Fuel Injected" "fits in perfectly as it has the feel of an introductory song". He noticed similarities between "Watch This" and "Pressure", which play back-to-back on the tracklist.

== Track listing ==
No.	Title	Original album	Length
1.	"Fuel Injected" (featuring Moka Only)	Bad Dreams	3:33
2.	"Black Magic"	Black Magic	3:55
3.	"Watch This"	Heavy	3:40
4.	"Pressure"	Black Magic	3:22
5.	"Too Hot"	Black Magic	3:26
6.	"Put Me On" (featuring Everlast and Moka Only)	Black Magic	4:04
7.	"Grind" (featuring Moka Only)	Black Magic	3:11
8.	"Deep End"	Bad Dreams	3:21
9.	"Blackout"	Black Magic	1:50
10.	"Lady Venom"	Balance	4:15
11.	"Dark Clouds" (featuring Evidence)	Black Magic	4:53
12.	"Breath" (featuring Nelly Furtado)	Monsters in the Closet	3:47
13.	"Bottom Line"	Heavy	3:31
14.	"Horrified Nights"	Balance	4:01
15.	"Warrior"	Armed to the Teeth	4:03
16.	"Pornstar"	Armed to the Teeth	3:22
17.	"Bring It Home" (featuring Moka Only)	Bad Dreams and Monsters in the Closet	3:14
18.	"Swamp Water" (featuring Phil Da Agony and Planet Asia)	Black Magic	3:08
Total length:			64:36

Bonus DVD

1. Behind the Scenes
2. "Breath" (music video)
3. "Steppin' Thru" (music video)
4. "Bring It Home" (music video)
5. "Fuel Injected" (music video)
6. "Take It Back" (music video)
7. "Lady Venom" (music video)
8. "Bollywood Chick" (music video)
9. "Warrior" (music video)
10. "Pornstar" (music video)
