= Heavy (Swollen Members album) =

- Canada release cover

Studio album by Swollen Members
- Released: November 18, 2003
- Studios: Battleaxe Studios (Vancouver, BC); Evidence's Studio (California); Soundcastle (California)
- Genre: Hip-hop
- Length: 57:35
- Label: Battle Axe Records
- Producers: Evidence, Moka Only, Nucleus, Rob the Viking, The Edgecrusher

Swollen Members chronology
Monsters in the Closet (2002)	Heavy (2003)	Black Magic (2006)

Singles from Heavy
- 1. "Watch This" Released: 2003

Heavy is the third studio album by the Canadian hip-hop group Swollen Members. It was released on November 18, 2003, by Battle Axe Records.

Recording sessions took place at Battleaxe Studios in Vancouver, Evidence's Studio and Soundcastle in California. The album includes Moka Only on every song, for the first time. The album was produced by Rob the Viking, Nucleus, Evidence, Moka Only, the Edgecrusher, and features guest appearances from Abstract Rude and Son Doobie.

The album debuted at number 14 on the Canadian Albums Chart for the week ending on October 26, 2003. At the 2004 Western Canadian Music Awards, the album won in the Outstanding Rap/Hip-Hop Recording category. The music video for "Watch This" peaked at number 21 on the MuchMusic Top 30 Countdown.

The CD version of Heavy includes a bonus DVD with 6 music videos, interviews and other footage. The album artwork was drawn by Spawn creator Todd McFarlane. The song "All Night" was featured in the 2003 video game SSX 3, and "Bottom Line" was in WWE Smackdown! vs. Raw.

After the release, Moka Only left the group and continued his solo career. The group removed the album from their official website following its release. Madchild once said "That's the only project we have reservations about. I like a certain amount of songs on that album, but we feel that whole project went in one particular direction and was rushed."

== Critical reception ==
Professional ratings
Review scores
Source	Rating
AllMusic	2.5/5 stars
Daily Vault	A
Now	3/5 Ns
RapReviews	8.5/10

Andy Lee of Chart Attack stated "SM have grown a tad too comfortable in their hip-hop niche of quasi-jiggy beats and Dungeons & Dragons rhymes. Apart from the Neptunes-influenced "Heat," there’s little that stands out". He named Prevail the most interesting of the three rappers.

Thomas Quinlan of Exclaim! compared the "shiny, clean, catchy and commercial" sound of the album to the "dark, fantasy feel" of their previous releases. He said each rappers flow fit well with the beats, but "come off as generic", crediting Moka Only for having the most "dynamic energy" of the group.

Joshua Ostroff of The Globe and Mail claimed the album was a "disaster", and said "blinded by the impending bling, they dulled their original edge with rote raps and bland club beats."

Hiphop in je smoel faulted the lyrics and choruses on the album, calling them "catchy" but "too wacky".

Jason Richards of Now criticized the album's lack of variety and claimed "this album finds the Members pandering to their fickle pop audience while trying to win back the rap heads who gave up on them".

Jason Thornberry of Daily Vault called it "a defining work" and "perfect", expressing that the album set itself apart stylistically from the work of other underground hip-hop artists of the time.

Steve Juon of RapReviews claimed "rather than playing to the lowest common denominator, they play to the highest", praising the group's confidence and "smart (but not intimidating) lyrics". He called Madchild's "Watch This" verse "one of the filthiest of a lead single in all rap history".

== Track listing ==
No.	Title	Writer(s)	Producer(s)	Length
1.	"Intro"	Kiley Hendriks; Robin Hooper	Rob the Viking	0:21
2.	"Block Party"	Hendriks; Daniel Denton; Shane Bunting; Hooper; West Plischke	Nucleus	3:37
3.	"Watch This"	Hendriks; Denton; Bunting; Hooper	Rob the Viking	3:42
4.	"Bottom Line"	Hendriks; Denton; Bunting; Hooper	Rob the Viking	3:48
5.	"Burn It Down"	Hendriks; Denton; Bunting; Plischke	Nucleus	3:15
6.	"Remember the Name"	Hendriks; Denton; Bunting; Michael Perretta	Evidence	5:07
7.	"Therapy"	Hendriks; Denton; Bunting; Hooper	Rob the Viking	3:49
8.	"Concentrate"	Hendriks; Denton; Bunting; Hooper; Plischke	Nucleus	3:31
9.	"Adrenaline"	Hendriks; Denton; Bunting; Hooper; Plischke	Nucleus	4:06
10.	"Don't Know Why" (featuring Abstract Rude)	Hendriks; Denton; Bunting; Aaron Pointer; Hooper	Rob the Viking; Moka Only	4:04
11.	"Paranoia"	Hendriks; Denton; Bunting; Hooper	Rob the Viking	4:01
12.	"All Night"	Hendriks; Denton; Bunting; Christian Olde Wolbers	The Edgecrusher	3:24
13.	"Heat"	Hendriks; Denton; Bunting; Perretta	Evidence	4:19
14.	"Ambush/Sensational Breed" (featuring Son Doobie)	Hendriks; Denton; Bunting; Hooper	Rob the Viking	10:31
Total length:				57:35

Bonus DVD

1. Exclusive Backstage and Live Footage
2. Colin McKay / DC Shoes Inc. Skateboarding Footage
3. Red Dragons / FSU Skateboarding Footage
4. "Breath" (music video)
5. "Steppin Thru" (music video)
6. "Bring It Home" (music video)
7. "Fuel Injected" (music video)
8. "Take It Back" (music video)
9. "Lady Venom" (music video)

== Personnel ==
- Kiley "Prevail" Hendriks – vocals (tracks: 1–14)
- Daniel "Moka Only" Denton – vocals (tracks: 2–14), producer (track 10)
- Shane "Madchild" Bunting – vocals (tracks: 2–14), executive producer
- Robin "Rob The Viking" Hooper – percussion (tracks: 2, 9), organ & additional guitar (track 2), additional percussion (track 8), strings & Rhodes electric piano (track 9), producer (tracks: 1, 3, 4, 7, 10, 11, 14), recording (tracks: 3–5, 7–11, 14)
- Michael "Evidence" Perretta – additional vocals (tracks: 2, 4, 6), handclaps (track 2), producer & recording (tracks: 6, 13)
- Gillian Damborg – additional vocals (track 3)
- Fiona Scott – additional vocals (track 3)
- Aaron "Abstract Rude" Pointer – additional vocals (track 10)
- Jason "Son Doobie" Vasquez – additional vocals (track 14)
- Kurt "DJ Revolution" Hoffman – scratches (track 7)
- West "Nucleus" Plischke – producer & recording (tracks: 2, 5, 8, 9), executive producer
- Christian Olde Wolbers – producer (track 12)
- Richard "Segal" Huredia – recording (track 12), mixing (tracks: 12, 13)
- Roger Swan – mixing (tracks: 2–11, 14)
- Kristina Ardron – mixing assistant (tracks: 2–11, 14)
- Todd McFarlane – cover illustration

== Charts ==
Chart (2003)	Peak position
Canadian Albums (Jam!)	14
