= Breath (Swollen Members song) =

- Promo single cover

Song by Swollen Members featuring Nelly Furtado

from the album Monsters in the Closet
- Released: November 12, 2002
- Studio: Hipposonic Studios
- Genre: Hip-hop
- Length: 3:50 (album version); 3:46 (promo single); 3:42 (music video)
- Label: Battle Axe Records
- Songwriters: Shane Bunting; Kiley Hendriks; Daniel Denton; Nelly Furtado
- Producer: Rob the Viking

Music video
- "Breath" on YouTube

"Breath" is a song by Canadian hip-hop group Swollen Members from their album Monsters in the Closet, released on November 12, 2002, by Battle Axe Records. The song was produced by Rob the Viking and features Nelly Furtado. The music video, directed by Todd McFarlane, reached number 1 on MuchMusic Countdown and won Best Rap Video at the 2003 MuchMusic Video Awards. It also won Video of the Year at the 2003 Western Canadian Music Awards.

In addition to its original release, "Breath" also appears on both of Swollen Members greatest hits albums, Greatest Hits: Ten Years of Turmoil (2010), and The Best Of (2022); as well as the group's live album Live at the Fox Theatre (2018). The song also appeared on the compilation album Now! 8 (Canada).

Nelly Furtado, Prevail and Moka Only grew up together in British Columbia.

== Personnel ==
- Shane "Madchild" Bunting – vocals
- Kiley "Prevail" Hendriks – vocals
- Daniel "Moka Only" Denton – vocals
- Nelly Furtado – vocals
- Robin "Rob the Viking" Hooper – producer

== Awards and nominations ==
MuchMusic Video Awards
Year	Award	Result	Ref(s)
2003	Best Rap Video	Won	
2003	Best Video	Nominated	
2003	Best Independent Video	Nominated	
2003	Peoples Choice: Favourite Canadian Group	Nominated	

Western Canadian Music Awards
Year	Award	Result	Ref(s)
2003	Video of the Year	Won	
