= Bring It Home =

Bring It Home may refer to:

- "Bring It Home" (song), a song by Swollen Members, 2002
- "Bring It Home", a song by Poison from their 1993 album Native Tongue
- "Bring It Home", a song by Feeder from their 2001 album Echo Park
- Bring It Home (Fateh album), 2016
- Bring It Home, a 1994 album by Savoy Brown

== See also ==
- Bring It On Home (disambiguation), several songs
- "Bring It On Home to Me", a 1961 song written and released by Sam Cooke
- Bringing It All Back Home, a 1965 album by Bob Dylan
