= Code Name: Scorpion =

Studio album by Code Name: Scorpion
- Released: August 7, 2001
- Studio: Hipposonic Studios
- Genre: Hip-hop
- Length: 51:59
- Label: Battle Axe Records
- Producers: Rob the Viking; Moka Only; Paul Nice

Singles from Code Name: Scorpion
- 1. "Smokin' in Here" Released: 2001

Code Name: Scorpion is a collaborative studio album by Code Name: Scorpion, consisting of American rapper Abstract Rude and Canadian rappers Prevail and Moka Only. It was released by Battle Axe Records on August 7, 2001. The album was produced by Rob the Viking, Moka Only, Paul Nice, and features one guest appearance from Madchild.

On February 1, 2017 the group released Kode Name Skorpius: The Best of CNS, with 8 tracks from Code Name: Scorpion and 3 new tracks. All three members were born in November and share the Scorpio astrological sign, which inspired the group's name.

== Critical reception ==
Professional ratings
Review scores
Source	Rating
AllMusic	3/5 stars
HipHopCore	4/5 stars
HipHopDX	4/5 stars
HipHopInfinity	3.33/5 stars
RapManiacz	3.5/5
RapReviews	8/10

Robert Gabriel of AllMusic described the album as "a lyrical colloquium of the highest order" with "a heap of honesty and a touch of quirkiness."

HipHopDX and HipHopInfinity both named "To Make Millions" and "She's Always Right" as top tracks of the album.

Many critics preferred the collaborative tracks over the solo tracks on Code Name: Scorpion. HipHopDX said "the album provides the best results when the 3 share the mic." Peter Matekovits of HipHopInfinity claimed "Code Name: Scorpion isn't the album it could have been, largely due to the lack of joint efforts between the emcees." Kevin Crouse of New Times Broward-Palm Beach stated "since the few group efforts here are so truly Herculean, everything else on the album is rendered fairly underwhelming." RapReviews said "this album hits its peak on songs featuring Ab, Prev, and Moka together with the Viking on production."

== Track listing ==
No.	Title	Writer(s)	Producer(s)	Length
1.	"Smokin' in Here"	Aaron Pointer; Kiley Hendriks; Daniel Denton	Rob the Viking	4:27
2.	"Stop Biting"	Pointer	Rob the Viking	4:40
3.	"Rifle Association"	Hendriks	Rob the Viking	2:45
4.	"And That You Can Quote"	Pointer; Hendriks; Denton	Rob the Viking	3:43
5.	"Pillow Fulla Scrilla"	Denton	Moka Only	3:41
6.	"Get Stung"	Pointer; Hendriks; Denton	Moka Only	4:48
7.	"Jam Packed"	Pointer; Hendriks; Denton	Rob the Viking	4:03
8.	"Screwed On Tight"	Pointer	Rob the Viking	2:34
9.	"To Make Millions" (featuring Madchild)	Pointer; Hendriks; Denton; Shane Bunting	Rob the Viking	4:11
10.	"Get What You Want"	Denton	Moka Only	3:45
11.	"Antz Out Of A Job"	Pointer; Hendriks; Denton	Rob the Viking	5:12
12.	"Way Out"	Denton	Paul Nice	3:57
13.	"She’s Always Right"	Pointer; Hendriks; Denton	Rob the Viking	4:13
Total length:				51:59

== Personnel ==
- Abstract Rude – vocals (tracks 1, 2, 4, 6–9, 11, 13)
- Prevail – vocals (tracks 1, 3, 4, 6, 7, 9, 11, 13)
- Moka Only – vocals (tracks: 1, 4–7, 9–13), producer (tracks 5, 6, 10)
- Madchild – vocals (track 9)
- Ndidi Cascade – vocals (track 13)
- Rob The Viking – producer (tracks: 1-4, 7–9, 11–13)
- Paul Nice – producer (track 12)
- Roger Swan – recording, mixing (tracks: 1–13)
