= Defenders of the Underworld =

Compilation album by Various Artists
- Released: October 5, 1999
- Genre: Hip-hop
- Length: 61:49
- Labels: Battle Axe Records; Jazz Fudge
- Producers: Uncle Howie; The Alchemist; Evidence; Big Duke; Sick Jacken; Paul Nice; KutMasta Kurt; Rob the Viking; Pep Love; Arsonists; Del the Funky Homosapien; Ralph M

Singles from Defenders of the Underworld
- 1. "Single One" Released: 1999; 2. "Single Two" Released: 2000

Professional ratings
Review scores
Source	Rating
AllMusic	3/5 stars
RapReviews	8.5/10
UGS Magazine	3.5/5

Defenders of the Underworld is a compilation album released by Battle Axe Records on October 5, 1999. The album was released in Europe with DJ Vadim's Jazz Fudge label.

== Track listing ==
No.	Title	Producer	Length
1.	"The Full Monty" (performed by Non Phixion)	Uncle Howie	2:55
2.	"Worst Enemy" (performed by Buc Fifty)	The Alchemist	3:51
3.	"Bottle Rocket" (performed by Swollen Members, Divine Styler, Everlast and Evidence)	Evidence	3:45
4.	"Cookin' Up Your Brain" (performed by Defari)	Evidence	4:08
5.	"Pow Wow" (performed by Psycho Realm)	Big Duke and Sick Jacken	5:25
6.	"Variety" (performed by Moka Only)	Paul Nice	3:15
7.	"Get Off My Elevator" (performed by Kool Keith)	KutMasta Kurt	3:45
8.	"Switchblade" (performed by Swollen Members)	Rob the Viking	3:26
9.	"Work the Angles (Remix)" (performed by Dilated Peoples)	Evidence	4:15
10.	"Trinity Lost" (performed by Pep Love)	Pep Love	3:42
11.	"Fat Laces" (performed by Arsonists)	Arsonists	3:51
12.	"Endangered Species" (performed by Swollen Members)	Evidence	2:34
13.	"Hoe!" (performed by Del the Funky Homosapien)	Del the Funky Homosapien	4:13
14.	"Buck Fifty 2 Yo Face" (performed by Son Doobie)	Ralph M	2:57
15.	"Skills" (performed by Mr. Brady and Evidence)	Evidence	4:49
16.	"Super Human Hip Hop Head" (performed by Aceyalone)	Evidence	4:58
Total length:			61:49

- In the European version track 8 is "Sinful Bliss" by Swollen Members
