= Fuel Injected =

- 12" single cover

Single by Swollen Members featuring Moka Only

from the album Bad Dreams
- B-side: "Fuel Injected Remix (featuring. Saukrates)"
- Released: November 13, 2001
- Studio: Hipposonic Studios
- Genre: Hip-hop
- Length: 3:32 (album version); 2:42 (music video)
- Label: Battle Axe Records
- Songwriters: Shane Bunting; Kiley Hendriks; Daniel Denton
- Producers: Concise; Kemo

Music video
- "Fuel Injected" on YouTube

"Fuel Injected" is a song by Canadian hip-hop group Swollen Members from their second studio album Bad Dreams, released on November 13, 2001, by Battle Axe Records. The song was produced by Concise and Kemo, and features Moka Only. The song debuted at number 44 on Broadcast Data Systems contemporary hit radio chart for the week ending on December 3. In 2002, a music video and a 12" single were released. The music video reached number 1 on MuchMusic Countdown, won 4 MuchMusic Video Awards and they performed the song at the awards show in 2002. The song was nominated for International Viewer's Choice: Canada at the 2002 MTV Video Music Awards. In 2024, FlipNJay Records released a 7" single for the song.

The song contains a sample of "Tears" by Giorgio Moroder. The music video was filmed at Hycroft Manor in Vancouver. The director of the video, Wendy Morgan, "visually based it on old-school portrait paintings of kings".

In addition to its original release, "Fuel Injected" also appears on both of Swollen Members greatest hits albums, Greatest Hits: Ten Years of Turmoil (2010), and The Best Of (2022); as well as the groups live album Live at The Fox Theatre (2018).

The song also appeared on multiple compilation albums in 2002 including Now! 7 (Canada), Juno Awards Nominee Collection, Circa Presents… by Mat the Alien, and The Unwashed Collection by Ed the Sock.

== Reception ==
It was named one of the top five songs and top three videos of 2002 by Vice Magazine in their year-end "Beats and Rhymes" section. The song is featured in the 2017 Apple Music playlist Happy Birthday Canada! 150 of the Best Canadian Songs Selected by Canadian Artists! In 2018, HuffPost named the song as one of "The Best Canadian Songs For Every Canada Day". In 2023, CBC named the song as one of "20 Songs That Tell the Story of Canadian Hip-Hop".

== Track listing ==
Battle Axe Records 12" (2002)

- A1. "Fuel Injected"
- A2. "Fuel Injected" (Instrumental)
- A3. "Lady Venom"
- B1. "Fuel Injected Remix" (featuring Saukrates)
- B2. "Fuel Injected Remix" (Instrumental)
- B3. "Lady Venom" (Instrumental)

FlipNJay Records 7" (2024)

- A. "Fuel Injected"
- B. "Lady Venom"

== Personnel ==
- Shane "Madchild" Bunting - vocals, executive producer (all tracks)
- Kiley "Prevail" Hendriks - vocals (all tracks)
- Daniel "Moka Only" Denton - vocals (tracks: A1, B1; A)
- Karl "Saukrates" Wailoo - vocals, producer (tracks: B1, B2)
- Jonathan "Concise" Alem - producer (tracks: A1, A2; A)
- Cristian "Kemo" Bahamonde - producer (tracks: A1, A2; A)
- Paul "Paul Nice" Kilianski - producer (tracks: A3, B3; B)

== Awards and nominations ==
MuchMusic Video Awards
Year	Award	Result	Ref(s)
2002	Best Rap Video	Won	
2002	Best Independent Video	Won	
2002	VideoFACT Award	Won	
2002	Best Director (Wendy Morgan)	Won	
2002	Best Video	Nominated	
2002	Best Cinematography	Nominated	

MTV Video Music Awards
Year	Award	Result	Ref(s)
2002	International Viewer's Choice: Canada	Nominated	

== Use in other media ==
- 2002 - Mat Hoffman's Pro BMX 2 soundtrack
- 2022 - I Like Movies soundtrack
