= Monsters in the Closet (Swollen Members album) =

Compilation album by Swollen Members
- Released: November 12, 2002
- Studio: Hipposonic Studios
- Genre: Hip-hop
- Length: 56:09
- Label: Battle Axe Records
- Producers: Rob the Viking, Kemo, Saukrates, Zodak, Evidence, DJ Vadim, Moka Only, Joey Chavez, Roger Swan, Chris Guy, Paul Nice, DJ Science, Mark B

Swollen Members chronology
Bad Dreams (2001)	Monsters in the Closet (2002)	Heavy (2003)

Singles from Monsters in the Closet
- 1. "Temptation" Released: 2001; 2. "Bring It Home" Released: 2002

Monsters in the Closet is a compilation album by Canadian hip-hop group Swollen Members, released on November 12, 2002, by Battle Axe Records. It is a collection of B-sides, unreleased tracks and three newly produced songs.

The album brought group membership for Moka Only and Rob the Viking and debuted at number 7 on the Canadian Albums Chart. Two of the new songs, "Breath" (featuring Nelly Furtado) and "Steppin' Thru", reached number one on the MuchMusic Top 30 Countdown. The single "Bring It Home" (which was a bonus track on Swollen Members previous album Bad Dreams) also topped the MuchMusic Countdown and peaked at number three on the Canadian singles chart.

In 2002 Monsters in the Closet was the 12th best-selling rap album in Canada, and the second best-selling rap album in Canada by a Canadian artist (behind their own album Bad Dreams). The album was certified gold by the CRIA with sales of over 70,000 copies across Canada, and won Rap Recording of the Year at the Juno Awards of 2003. The music video for "Breath", directed by Todd McFarlane, won Best Rap Video at the 2003 MuchMusic Video Awards. At the 2003 Western Canadian Music Awards, "Breath" won Video of the Year and the album won in the Outstanding Rap/Hip-Hop Recording category.

== Critical reception ==
Professional ratings
Review scores
Source	Rating
AllMusic	3/5 stars
HipHopCore	3/5 stars
Now	3/5 Ns

Dan LeRoy of AllMusic said the newly recorded tracks "won't necessarily be a pleasant surprise for the Members' devoted fanbase", but stated "the remainder of the album provides a generous helping of the less-conventional musical ambition" that the group was known for. He named "Long Way Down" a standout track.

Hiphop in je smoel stated "The 'new' sound will not appeal to all old listeners but there is enough Swollen as usual to make everyone happy."

Impact Press said "Core fans will be delighted with the inclusion of tracks like "Breath," "Battle Axe Exclusive," "Crunch" and "New Details."

Rahul Gupta of Now called the album "competent if unspectacular", praising the tracks "Breath" and "Long Way Down".

Andrew Jones of XLR8R claimed "Retrospective albums are usually wildly uneven, but these songs just move." He said the tracks "Breath" and "English Breakfast" were "refreshing breaks" from the group's other material.

== Track listing ==
No.	Title	Writer(s)	Producer(s)	Length
1.	"Intro"		Rob the Viking	0:49
2.	"Steppin' Thru"	Shane Bunting, Kiley Hendriks, Daniel Denton	Kemo	3:25
3.	"Breath" (featuring Nelly Furtado)	Bunting, Hendriks, Denton, Nelly Furtado	Rob the Viking	3:50
4.	"Fuel Injected (Remix)" (featuring Saukrates)	Bunting, Hendriks, Denton, Karl Wailoo	Saukrates	3:50
5.	"Battle Axe Exclusive"	Bunting, Hendriks	Zodak	2:34
6.	"Heavy Thinkers" (featuring Buc Fifty)	Bunting, Hendriks, Rashaan Jackson	Evidence	2:28
7.	"English Breakfast"	Bunting, Hendriks	DJ Vadim	2:23
8.	"Red Dragon"	Denton	Moka Only	3:01
9.	"Bring It Home"	Bunting, Hendriks, Denton	Rob the Viking	3:14
10.	"Zenith"	Bunting, Hendriks	Zodak	2:36
11.	"Members Only"	Bunting, Hendriks	Joey Chavez	2:23
12.	"Act On It"	Bunting, Hendriks	Rob the Viking	3:36
13.	"Long Way Down"	Bunting, Hendriks	Rob the Viking, Roger Swan, Chris Guy	3:29
14.	"Temptation"	Bunting, Hendriks	Joey Chavez	2:38
15.	"The Capitol"	Bunting, Hendriks	Rob the Viking	1:51
16.	"Crunch"	Bunting, Hendriks, Denton	Paul Nice	2:21
17.	"Northern Lights" (featuring Iriscience)	Bunting, Hendriks, Rakaa Taylor	Joey Chavez	4:03
18.	"Rockapella"	Hendriks	Roger Swan	0:52
19.	"Freak Fantastic"	Bunting, Hendriks	DJ Science, Rob the Viking, Roger Swan	3:13
20.	"New Details"	Bunting, Hendriks	Mark B, DJ Babu	3:33
Total length:				56:09

== Personnel ==
- Kiley "Prevail" Hendriks – vocals (tracks: 2–7, 9-20)
- Shane "Madchild" Bunting – vocals (tracks: 2–7, 9-17, 19, 20)
- Daniel "Moka Only" Denton – vocals (tracks: 2–4, 8, 9, 16), producer (track 8)
- Robin "Rob The Viking" Hooper – producer (tracks: 1, 3, 9, 12, 13, 15, 19)
- Cristian "DJ Kemo" Bahamonde – producer (track 2)
- Nelly Furtado – vocals (track 3)
- Karl "Saukrates" Wailoo – vocals, producer (track 4)
- "DJ Zodak" – producer (tracks: 5, 10), scratches (track 5)
- Rashaan "Buc Fifty" Jackson – vocals (track 6)
- Michael "Evidence" Perretta – producer (track 6)
- Kurt "DJ Revolution" Hoffman – scratches (track 6, 12)
- "DJ Vadim" Peare – producer, scratches (track 7)
- Joey Chavez – producer (track 11, 14, 17)
- Jason "J Rocc" Jackson – scratches (track 11)
- Richard Toby Peter – bass (track 13)
- Finn Mannichi – cello (track 13)
- Tony Bernal – viola, violin (track 13)
- Mark Ferris – violin (track 13)
- Chris Guy – producer (track 13)
- Roger Swan – producer (tracks: 13, 18, 19)
- Paul "Paul Nice" Kilianski – producer (track 16)
- Rakaa "Iriscience" Taylor – vocals (track 17)
- Chris "DJ Babu" Oroc – scratches (track 17, 20)
- "DJ Science" – producer (track 19)
- Mark "Mark B" Barnes – producer (track 20)

== Charts ==
Chart (2002)	Peak position
Canadian Albums (Jam!)	7

=== Year-end charts ===
Year-end chart performance for Monsters in the Closet by Swollen Members
Chart (2002)	Position
Canadian Albums (Nielsen SoundScan)	132
Canadian R&B Albums (Nielsen SoundScan)	25
Canadian Rap Albums (Nielsen SoundScan)	12
