= VideoFACT Award =

MuchMusic award

The following is a list of the MuchMusic Video Awards winners for the "VideoFACT Award", also called the "VideoFACT Best Independent Video Award" in 2008 and "VideoFACT Indie Video of the Year" in 2009 after merging the "Best Independent Video Award" with the "VideoFACT Award".

Year	Artist	Video
1990	Chalk Circle	"Together"
1991	Tony Papa	"Beauty and the Beast"
1992	Barenaked Ladies	"Lovers In A Dangerous Time"
1993	Funkasaurus	"Just Don't Say"
1994	Shadowy Men on a Shadowy Planet	"They Don't Call Them Chihuahuas Anymore"
1995	Furnaceface	"This Will Make You Happy"
1996	Great Big Sea	"Goin' Up"
1997	Bran Van 3000	"Drinking in L.A."
1998	Michie Mee	"Covergirl"
1999	Black Katt	"If I Were A Planet"
2000	Serial Joe	"DEEP"
2002	Swollen Members f. Moka Only	"Fuel Injected"
2003	Sam Roberts	"Brother Down"
2004	Alexisonfire	"Counterparts and Number Them"
2005	Death From Above 1979	"Blood On Our Hands"
2006	Kardinal Offishall f. Ray Robinson	"Everyday (Rudebwoy)"
2007	Tokyo Police Club	"Cheer It On"
2008	Wintersleep	"Weighty Ghost"
2009	The Midway State	"Never Again"
2010	Belly f. Snoop Dogg	"Hot Girl"
2011	JDiggz f. Neverending White Lights	"This Time"
2012	City and Colour	"Fragile Bird"
