= Juno Award for Rap Recording of the Year =

Music award in Canada

The Juno Award for Rap Recording of the Year was introduced in 1991, and awarded for the best rap album in Canada. It was formerly known as Best Rap Recording from 1993 to 2002.

Before 1999, because of the relatively limited commercial visibility of Canadian hip hop, the award was presented the evening before the main Juno Award ceremony, along with the untelevised technical and industry insider awards. In 1998, Rascalz won the award, but claiming racism as a factor in the award's scheduling, refused to accept it. The Junos moved the award to the main ceremony the following year.

The award nominations commonly mixed individual singles and full albums. At the Juno Awards of 2021, CARAS president Allan Reid announced that beginning with the Juno Awards of 2022, the category will be split into new separate categories for Rap Album/EP of the Year and Rap Single of the Year.

== Winners ==
=== Rap Recording of the Year (1991 - 1992) ===
Year	Winner(s)	Recording	Nominees	Ref.
1991	Maestro Fresh-Wes	Symphony in Effect	Simply Majestic with B-Kool, "Dance to the Music (Work Your Body)"; MCJ and Cool G, "So Listen"; Spunkadelic, "Take Me Like I Am"; Dream Warriors, "Wash Your Face in My Sink"	
1992	Dream Warriors	"My Definition of a Boombastic Jazz Style"	Maestro Fresh-Wes, "Conductin' Things"; Michie Mee and L.A. Luv, Jamaican Funk: Canadian Style; Simply Majestic, "Play the Music DJ"; Kish, "She's a Flirt (Let's Do It)"	

=== Best Rap Recording (1993 - 2002) ===
Year	Winner(s)	Recording	Nominees	Ref.
1993	Devon	Keep It Slammin'	Maestro Fresh-Wes, Maestro Zone; The Maximum Definitive, "The Jungle Man"; Organized Rhyme, "Check the O.R."; Ragga Muffin Rascals, Really Livin'	
1994	TBTBT	One Track Mind	B-Kool, "Got to Get Over"; Devon, "Call the Cops"; Rumble, "Safe"; Split Personality, "Try and Stop Us"	
1995	Ghetto Concept	"Certified"	Freaks of Reality, Chi-Litchi-Latchi-Low; Maestro Fresh-Wes, Naaah, Dis Kid Can't Be from Canada?!!; Rascalz, Really Livin'; Dream Warriors, Subliminal Simulation	
1996	Ghetto Concept	"E-Z On tha Motion"	Da Grassroots with Elemental, "Drama"; UBAD, "The Legacy"; Saukrates, "Still Caught Up"; Cipher, "360 Degrees"	
1997	Choclair	What It Takes	Scales Empire, Bright Lights, Big City; Rascalz, FitnRedi; Dream Warriors, The Master Plan; Kardinal Offishall, Naughty Dread	
1998	Rascalz	Cash Crop. Award refused by artist.	Infinite featuring Divine Earth Essence, "Gotta Get Mine"; Choclair, "Just A Second Remix"; Ghetto Concept, "Krazy World"; Frankenstein, "Rain Is Gone"	
1999	Rascalz featuring Choclair, Kardinal Offishall, Thrust and Checkmate	"Northern Touch"	Maestro, Built to Last; Citizen Kane, The Epic; Frankenstein, Frankenstein UV; Ghetto Concept, Ghetto Concept, The Album	
2000	Choclair	Ice Cold	Citizen Kane, Deliverance; Rascalz, Global Warning; Saukrates, Money or Love; Michie Mee with Esthero, Don't Wanna Be Your Slave	
2001	Swollen Members	Balance	DJ Serious, Dim Sum; Kardinal Offishall, Husslin'; BrassMunk, "Live Ordeal"; Baby Blue Soundcrew feat. Kardinal Offishall, Sean Paul and Jully Black, "Money Jane"	
2002	Swollen Members	Bad Dreams	Solitair, "Easy to Slip"; Kardinal Offishall, Quest for Fire: Firestarter, Vol. 1; Jelleestone, Jelleestone Thirteen; Ghetto Concept feat, Snow, Kardinal Offishall, Maestro, Red-One and Ironside, "Still Too Much"	

=== Rap Recording of the Year (2003 - 2021) ===
Year	Winner(s)	Recording	Nominees	Ref.
2003	Swollen Members	Monsters in the Closet	BrassMunk, El Dorado; Checkmate, R.A.W.; K-Os, Exit; Rascalz, Reloaded	
2004	Choclair	Flagrant	BrassMunk, Dark Sunrise; IRS, Welcome to Planet IRS; Mr. Roam, Tom Strokes Presents the ClasSix Plus Six; Sweatshop Union, Natural Progression	
2005	k-os	Joyful Rebellion	Kardinal Offishall, "Bang Bang"; Concise, "F.A.M.E."; DL Incognito, Life's a Collection of Experiences; Kyprios, Say Something	
2006	K'naan	The Dusty Foot Philosopher	Classified, Boy-Cott-In the Industry; Kardinal Offishall, Fire and Glory; Eternia, It's Called Life; Sweatshop Union, United We Fall	
2007	Swollen Members	Black Magic	Rich London, The Answer; Arabesque, The Frenzy of Renown; Classified, Hitch Hikin' Music; DL Incognito, Organic Music for a Digital World	
2008	Belly	The Revolution	BrassMunk, The Fewturistic; JDiggz, Memoirs of a Playbwoy; Marco Polo, Port Authority; Shad, The Old Prince	
2009	Kardinal Offishall	Not 4 Sale	DL Incognito, A Captured Moment in Time; D-Sisive, The Book; Famous, I Rap Now; Point Blank, Point Blank	
2010	Drake	So Far Gone	Classified, Self Explanatory; Big Page, Drake & U.G.O Crew, "I'm Still Fly"; K'naan, Troubadour; K-os, Yes!	
2011	Shad	TSOL	Eternia and MoSS, At Last; Drake, Thank Me Later; Ghettosocks, Treat of the Day; D-Sisive, Vaudeville	
2012	Drake	Take Care	Classified, Handshakes and Middle Fingers; D-Sisive, Jonestown 2: Jimmy Go Bye-Bye; Kardinal Offishall, Anywhere (Ol' Time Killin' Pt. 2); Swollen Members, Dagger Mouth	
2013	Classified feat. David Myles	"Inner Ninja"	JD Era, No Handouts; Rich Kidd/SonReal, The Closers; Madchild, Dope Sick; Maestro Fresh Wes, Black Tuxedo EP	
2014	Drake	Nothing Was the Same	Classified, Classified; Rich Kidd, In My Opinion; Shad, Flying Colours; SonReal, Everywhere We Go	
2015	Naturally Born Strangers	The Legends League Presents: Naturally Born Strangers	Marco Polo, PA2: The Director's Cut; P Reign, Dear America; Saukrates, Amani; Tre Mission, Stigmata	
2016	Drake	If You're Reading This It's Too Late	BADBADNOTGOOD & Ghostface Killah, Sour Soul; Kardinal Offishall, Kardi Gras, Vol. 1: The Clash; k-os, Can't Fly Without Gravity; SonReal, For the Town	
2017	Jazz Cartier	Hotel Paranoia	Drake, Views; Belly, Another Day in Paradise; Tory Lanez, I Told You; Tasha the Amazon, Die Every Day	
2018	Tory Lanez	Shooters	Belly, Mumble Rap; Clairmont the Second, Lil Mont From the Ave; Lou Phelps, 001: Experiments; Maestro Fresh Wes, Coach Fresh	
2019	Tory Lanez	Love Me Now?	88Glam, 88Glam Reloaded; Belly, Immigrant; Killy, Surrender Your Soul; NAV, Reckless	
2020	Tory Lanez	Freaky	88Glam, 88GLAM2; Classified, Tomorrow Could Be the Day Things Change; Killy, Light Path 8; Nav, Bad Habits	
2021	Tobi	ELEMENTS Vol. 1	88Glam, New Mania; bbno$ and Yung Gravy, Baby Gravy 2; Eric Reprid, Cold World; NAV, Good Intentions (Brown Boy 2 Deluxe Version)	

== See also ==
- Canadian hip hop
- Music of Canada
