= Deliverance (Citizen Kane album) =

Studio album by Citizen Kane
- Released: September 14, 1999
- Genre: Canadian hip hop
- Length: 60:58
- Label: Treehouse Records
- Producers: Citizen Kane; Fin-S; S-Luv

Citizen Kane chronology
The Epic (1997)	Deliverance (1999)

Deliverance is the debut studio album by Canadian hip hop group Citizen Kane, released on September 14, 1999, by independent label Treehouse Records. It was nominated for Best Rap Recording at the 2000 Juno Awards. The 2001 documentary Raisin' Kane: A Rapumentary details the promotion and release of the album.

== Reception ==
Del F. Cowie of Exclaim! praised Deliverance as a "well-executed project" that "trims the fat and maintains [the group's] previous high level of quality control."

== Track listing ==
No.	Title	Producer(s)	Length
1.	"Intro"		0:28
2.	"Deliverance"	Fin-S	4:54
3.	"Soldier Story"	S-Luv; Fin-S	4:49
4.	"Interlude"		0:31
5.	"Monopoly Money"	Fin-S; Citizen Kane	3:46
6.	"Gambler"	Fin-S	3:45
7.	"Ini" (featuring Cali'Fate)	Fin-S	4:48
8.	"Yancy"		1:33
9.	"Graffiti Knights" (featuring Alana Bridgewater)	Fin-S	4:48
10.	"Remembrance Day"	Fin-S; Citizen Kane	4:12
11.	"Who the Fuck"	Fin-S	4:21
12.	"Interlude"		0:26
13.	"Tech Blows" (featuring Mission Holiday)	Fin-S	5:06
14.	"Ice Niggaz"	Fin-S	3:33
15.	"Interlude"		0:10
16.	"In da Cut" (featuring Camille Douglas)	Fin-S; Citizen Kane	4:08
17.	"Confrontations"	Fin-S	4:50
18.	"Eavesdroppin'" (featuring Dub-ill)	Fin-S	4:34
Total length:			60:58

Samples

- "Soldier Story" contains a sample of "The Changing World" by George Benson
