= Bring It Home (song) =

- 12" single cover

Single by Swollen Members featuring Moka Only

from the album Bad Dreams and Monsters in the Closet
- B-side: "Freak Fantastic"
- Released: 2002
- Studio: Hipposonic Studios
- Genre: Hip-hop
- Length: 3:15 (album version); 3:05 (music video)
- Label: Battle Axe Records
- Songwriters: Shane Bunting; Kiley Hendriks; Daniel Denton
- Producer: Rob the Viking

Music video
- "Bring It Home" on YouTube

"Bring It Home" is a song by Canadian hip-hop group Swollen Members, released in 2002 by Battle Axe Records. The song was produced by Rob the Viking and features Moka Only. It was a bonus track on the reissue of their second studio album Bad Dreams, and appeared on their next album Monsters in the Closet. It was also released as a single on 12" and CD. The song became the group's highest-charting, peaking at number three on the Canadian singles chart. The music video, directed by Wendy Morgan, reached number one on MuchMusic Countdown in 2002.

In addition to its original release, "Bring It Home" also appears on both of Swollen Members' greatest hits albums, Greatest Hits: Ten Years of Turmoil (2010), and The Best Of (2022); as well as the group's live album Live at The Fox Theatre (2018).

== Track listing ==
12"

- A1. "Bring It Home"
- A2. "Freak Fantastic"
- A3. "Heavy Thinkers"
- B1. "Bring It Home" (Instrumental)
- B2. "Freak Fantastic" (Instrumental)
- B3. "Heavy Thinkers" (Instrumental)

CD

1. "Bring It Home"
2. "Lady Venom"
3. "Fuel Injected Remix" (featuring Saukrates)

== Personnel ==
Both

- Shane "Madchild" Bunting - vocals, executive producer (all tracks)
- Kiley "Prevail" Hendriks - vocals (all tracks)
- Robin "Rob the Viking" Hooper - producer (tracks: A1, A2, B1, B2; 1)
- Daniel "Moka Only" Denton - vocals (tracks: A1; 1)

12"

- Roger Swan - producer (tracks: A2, B2)
- DJ Science - producer (tracks: A2, B2)
- Michael "Evidence" Perretta - producer (tracks: A3, B3)
- Rashaan "Buc Fifty" Jackson - vocals (tracks: A3)

CD

- Paul "Paul Nice" Kilianski - producer (track: 2)
- Karl "Saukrates" Wailoo - vocals, producer (track: 3)
