= Dagger Mouth =

Studio album by Swollen Members
- Released: April 12, 2011
- Studios: Battle Axe (Vancouver); Rob's Place (Vancouver); Craig's Storage (Vancouver); Abandoned Nation Studios (New York)
- Genre: Hip-hop
- Length: 52:47
- Labels: Battle Axe Records; Suburban Noize
- Producers: Aspect; DJ Corbett; Rob The Viking

Swollen Members chronology
Armed to the Teeth (2009)	Dagger Mouth (2011)	Beautiful Death Machine (2013)

Singles from Dagger Mouth
- 1. "Mr. Impossible" Released: January 18, 2011; 2. "Bring Me Down (Remix)" Released: February 22, 2011

Dagger Mouth is the sixth studio album by Canadian hip-hop group Swollen Members. It was released on April 12, 2011, by Battle Axe Records and Suburban Noize Records. The album is produced by Rob The Viking, Aspect and DJ Corbett, and features a lone guest appearance from Saigon on the remix of his own song "Bring Me Down" from The Greatest Story Never Told. The album debuted at number 15 on the Billboard Canadian Albums chart. The album was nominated for Rap Recording of the Year at the Juno Awards of 2012. It won Rap/Hip-Hop Recording of the Year at the 2012 Western Canadian Music Awards.

== Critical reception ==
Professional ratings
Review scores
Source	Rating
AllMusic	3.5/5 stars
HipHopDX	4/5
RapReviews	8/10
Vancouver Sun	3.5/5 stars

Alex Henderson of AllMusic claimed the album contained "plenty of hedonism and hip-hop braggadocio, but there is also an abundance of sobering introspection". He said sometimes "Dagger Mouth becomes dark-humored, but other times, the album is just plain dark" and called the production "funky" and "moody".

Steve Juon of RapReviews expressed "like a classic Wes Craven film the moments of depravity and insanity are measured with a good dose of humor and wit to make them that much more palatable. You can't simply lump a Swollen Members album into the overabused and misused horrorcore cliche though, because there’s lyricism and production values here going well beyond mindless violence."

Francois Marchand of Vancouver Sun stated "Hendriks and Bunting spit rhymes about hitting rock bottom ("The Shining"), anxiety disorders ("Chemical Imbalance") and redemption ("Fresh Air"), blurring the lines between reality, horror movies and comic books over Hooper's nightmarish soundscapes and beats."

== Track listing ==
No.	Title	Writer(s)	Producer(s)	Length
1.	"Do or Die"	Shane Bunting; Kiley Hendriks; Robin Hooper	Rob The Viking	3:26
2.	"The Shining"	Bunting; Hendriks; Reece Zazulak; Hooper	Aspect; Rob The Viking (co.)	4:06
3.	"Night Vision"	Bunting; Hendriks; Francisco Chacon; Hooper	Rob The Viking	2:29
4.	"Mr. Impossible"	Bunting; Hendriks; Hooper	Rob The Viking	2:32
5.	"Calming of the Beast" (Instrumental Interlude)	Hooper	Rob The Viking	0:32
6.	"Moonshine"	Bunting; Hendriks; Hooper	Rob The Viking	3:31
7.	"House of Sin"	Bunting; Hendriks; Hooper	Rob The Viking	2:59
8.	"Chemical Imbalance"	Bunting; Hooper	Rob The Viking	2:06
9.	"Fire"	Bunting; Hendriks; Hooper	Rob The Viking	3:48
10.	"Fresh Air"	Bunting; Hendriks; Hooper	Rob The Viking	3:24
11.	"War Money"	Bunting; Hendriks; Zazulak; Hooper	Aspect; Rob The Viking (co.)	4:16
12.	"The Predator"	Bunting; Hendriks; Hooper	Rob The Viking	2:51
13.	"Devil"	Bunting; Hendriks; Hooper	Rob The Viking	3:29
14.	"White Python/Black Tarantula/Sound of the Drum"	Bunting; Hendriks; Hooper	Rob The Viking	4:41
15.	"Electric Chair"	Bunting; Hendriks; Ron Mejia; Hooper	Rob The Viking	4:10
16.	"Bring Me Down (Remix)" (featuring Saigon)	Bunting; Hendriks; Brian Carenard; Dustin James Corbett	DJ Corbett	4:27
Total length:				52:47

== Personnel ==
- Shane "Madchild" Bunting – vocals (tracks: 1–4, 6–16), executive producer, art direction
- Kiley "Prevail" Hendriks – vocals (tracks: 1–4, 6, 7, 9–16)
- Robin "Rob The Viking" Hooper – producer (tracks: 1, 3–10, 12–15), co-producer (tracks: 2, 11), recording, art direction
- Brian "Saigon" Carenard – vocals (track 16)
- Francisco Chacon – scratches (track 3)
- Mike Kumagai – additional piano (track 7), additional drum programming (track 9), guitar (track 12), mixing
- "DJ Itchy Ron" Mejia – scratches (track 15)
- Reece "Aspect" Zazulak – producer (tracks: 2, 11)
- Dustin Corbett – producer (track 16)
- Tom Baker – mastering
- Kevin Zinger – executive producer, management
- Brad "Daddy X" Xavier – executive producer
- Nick The Russian – art direction, design
- Raymond Brown – artwork, additional design
- Mike Cockburn – photography
- Ivory Daniel – management
- Violet Brown – management

== Charts ==
Chart (2011)	Peak position
Canadian Albums (Billboard)	15
US Top Rap Albums (Billboard)	18
US Independent Albums (Billboard)	41
US Heatseekers Albums (Billboard)	3
US Top Current Album Sales (Billboard)	179
