= The Epic (EP) =

EP by Citizen Kane
- Released: 1997
- Genre: Canadian hip hop
- Length: 24:59
- Label: Treehouse Records
- Producer: K-Cut; Erf Productions

Citizen Kane chronology
The Epic (1997)	Deliverance (1999)

The Epic is an EP by Canadian hip-hop duo Citizen Kane, released in 1997, by independent label Treehouse Records. The EP was nominated for Best Rap Recording at the 1999 Juno Awards.

== Track listing ==
Act 1 (Side 1)
No.	Title	Producer(s)	Length
1.	"Raisin' Kane"	K-Cut	3:31
2.	"Elements of Mind (Black Rain Remix)" (featuring Down to Erf)	Erf Productions	4:25
3.	"The Gambler"	Erf Productions	4:37

Act 2 (Side 2)
No.	Title	Producer(s)	Length
4.	"Lost Angels"	K-Cut	4:23
5.	"Reality n' Facts"	Erf Productions	3:34
6.	"Lost Angels (Instrumental)"	K-Cut	4:23

Samples

- "Raisin' Kane" contains a sample of "Nights Are Forever Without You" by Bob James
- "The Gambler" contains a sample of "I Love Music" by Ahmad Jamal
- "Lost Angels" contains a sample of "Funny How Time Flies (When You're Having Fun)" by Janet Jackson
