= 2003 MuchMusic Video Awards =

- Starring: George Stroumboulopoulos, Bradford How
- Country of origin: Canada

Production
- Producer: MuchMusic
- Running time: 2 hours

Original release
- Network: MuchMusic
- Release: June 22, 2003

The 2003 MuchMusic Video Awards were held 22 June 2003 and featured performances by Avril Lavigne, Disturbed, Michelle Branch, Our Lady Peace, Sam Roberts, Sean Paul, Simple Plan, and Ashanti.

== Best Video ==
- Our Lady Peace – "Innocent"
- Matthew Good – "In a World Called Catastrophe"
- Shawn Desman – "Get Ready"
- Swollen Members featuring Nelly Furtado – “Breath”
- Treble Charger – "Hundred Million"

== Best cinematography ==
- Our Lady Peace – "Innocent"
- Chantal Kreviazuk – "Time"
- Rascalz f. Notch & Sazon Diamante – "Crazy World"
- Theory of a Deadman – "Nothing Could Come Between Us"
- Treble Charger – "Hundred Million"

== Best Director ==
- Treble Charger – "Hundred Million"
- Matthew Good – "In a World Called Catastrophe"
- Our Lady Peace – "Innocent"
- Remy Shand – "Rocksteady"
- Shawn Desman – "Get Ready"

== Best French Video ==
- Daniel Bélanger – "Dans un spoutnik"
- Corneille – "Ensemble"
- Les Cowboys Fringants – "En Berne"
- Les Marmottes Aplaties – "Gagner"
- Vulgaires Machins – "Comme une brique"

== Best Independent Video ==
- Not By Choice – "Now That You Are Leaving"
- Alexisonfire – "Pulmonary Archery"
- Sam Roberts – "Brother Down"
- Swollen Members f. Nelly Furtado – "Breath"
- The Salads – "Get Loose"

== Best International Video – Artist ==
- Sean Paul – "Gimme The Light"
- 50 Cent – "In Da Club"
- Ashanti – "Happy"
- Beyoncé – "Work It Out"
- Christina Aguilera – "Beautiful"
- Eminem – "Without Me"
- Eminem – "Cleaning Out My Closet"
- Justin Timberlake – "Cry Me a River"
- Missy Elliott – "Work It"
- Nelly – "Hot in Herre"

== Best International Video by a Canadian ==
- Avril Lavigne – "Sk8er Boi"
- Avril Lavigne – "I'm With You"
- Lillix – "It's About Time"
- Simple Plan – "Addicted"
- Sum 41 – "Still Waiting"

== Best International Video – Group ==
- The White Stripes – "Seven Nation Army"
- Audioslave – "Cochise"
- Coldplay – “In My Place”
- Disturbed – "Prayer"
- Good Charlotte – "The Anthem"
- Linkin Park – "Somewhere I Belong"
- The Music – "Take the Long Road and Walk It"
- Queens of the Stone Age – "Go with the Flow"
- System of a Down – "Boom!"
- Weezer – "Keep Fishin'"

== Best Pop Video ==
- Shawn Desman – "Get Ready"
- Chantal Kreviazuk – "In This Life"
- In Essence – "IE"
- Remy Shand – "Rocksteady"
- Sam Roberts – "Brother Down"

== Best Post Production ==
- Danko Jones – "Lovercall"
- BrassMunk ft. Ivana Santilli & Karmel Klutch – "El Dorado"
- Matthew Good – "In a World Called Catastrophe"
- Our Lady Peace – "Innocent"
- Treble Charger – "Hundred Million"

== MuchLOUD Best Rock Video ==
- Treble Charger – "Hundred Million"
- Not By Choice – "Now That You Are Leaving"
- Our Lady Peace – "Innocent"
- Simple Plan – "I'd Do Anything"
- Theory of a Deadman – "Nothing Could Come Between Us"

== MuchMoreMusic Award ==
- Shania Twain – "Up!"
- Blue Rodeo – "Bulletproof"
- Celine Dion – "I Drove All Night"
- Chantal Kreviazuk – "Time"
- Remy Shand – "Rocksteady"

== MuchVIBE Best Rap Video ==
- Swollen Members f. Nelly Furtado – "Breath"
- BrassMunk – "Big"
- Dirty Circus (Sweatshop Union) – "The Truth We Speak"
- k-os – "Superstarr"
- Rascalz ft. Notch & Sazon Diamante – "Crazy World"

== People's Choice – Favourite Canadian Artist ==
- Avril Lavigne
- Chantal Kreviazuk
- Matthew Good
- Sam Roberts
- Shawn Desman

== People's Choice – Favourite Canadian Group ==
- Simple Plan
- Our Lady Peace
- Sum 41
- Swollen Members
- Theory of a Deadman

== People's Choice – Favourite International Artist ==
- Eminem
- 50 Cent
- Christina Aguilera
- Justin Timberlake
- Nelly

== People's Choice – Favourite International Group ==
- Good Charlotte
- Coldplay
- Linkin Park
- Red Hot Chili Peppers
- The White Stripes

== VideoFACT Award ==
- Sam Roberts – "Brother Down"

== Performers ==
- Ashanti – Rock Wit U (Awww Baby)
- Avril Lavigne – Losing Grip
- Disturbed – Prayer
- Michelle Branch – Are You Happy Now
- Our Lady Peace – Innocent
- Sam Roberts – Don't Walk Away Eileen
- Sean Paul – Get Busy
- Simple Plan – I'd Do Anything
