= Brand New Day (Swollen Members album) =

Studio album by Swollen Members
- Released: June 17, 2014
- Venue: Blue Light Studios
- Studios: The Chambers Studio (Vancouver, BC)
- Genre: Hip-hop
- Length: 42:50
- Label: Battle Axe
- Producers: C-Lance; Rob the Viking

Swollen Members chronology
Beautiful Death Machine (2013)	Brand New Day (2014)

Brand New Day is the eighth studio album by Canadian hip-hop group Swollen Members. It was released on June 17, 2014 via Battle Axe Records. Recording sessions took place at the Chambers Studio in Vancouver and at Blue Light Studios. Production was ahndled by Rob The Viking and C-Lance. It features guest appearances from DJ Makeway and DJ Revolution, and contributions from Dalla Hooper and drummer Tim Proznick. The album peaked at number 8 on the Billboard Canadian Albums, as well as number 146 on the Top Current Albums, number 13 on the Top Rap Albums and number 7 on the Heatseekers Albums charts in the United States.

== Critical reception ==
Professional ratings
Review scores
Source	Rating
Exclaim!	7/10
HipHopDX	3/5
RapReviews	7/10

Rob Boffard of Exclaim! stated: "it's the individual bright spots that salvage Brand New Day, if only just. The dark imagery Swollen Members specialized in was growing tired; it was a problem on their last two albums and, to some extent, it's a problem on this one. But consider this album as step towards something bigger, and it will all make a crazy kind of sense". Steve Juon of RapReviews.com expressed: "they have nailed down a trademark sound to the point an album like Brand New Day is as excellent as it is par for the course. The difference for newcomers to the group will be Madchild's distinctive nasally voice, you hate it or you love it. From this writer's vantage point S.M. just wouldn't work without it". Omar Burgess of HipHopDX wrote: "some 15 years into their careers, it's hard to fault Swollen Members for experimenting, especially when they successfully push beyond their comfort zone. Brand New Day provides a somewhat unbalanced but ultimately pleasing mix of their signature stylings with enough experimentation to both keep things interesting and possibly hint at what's next for the group".

== Track listing ==
No.	Title	Writer(s)	Producer(s)	Length
1.	"Intro"	Shane Bunting; Kiley Hendriks; Robin Hooper	Rob The Viking	0:20
2.	"Nemesis"	Bunting; Hendriks; Hooper	Rob The Viking	1:59
3.	"Blood Sport"	Bunting; Hendriks; Hooper	Rob The Viking	2:54
4.	"Cock Blocker"	Bunting; Hendriks; Craig Lanciani; Hooper	C-Lance; Rob The Viking (co.)	4:20
5.	"Brand New Day"	Bunting; Hendriks; Hooper	Rob The Viking	3:41
6.	"Angel of Death"	Bunting; Hendriks; Lanciani; Hooper	C-Lance; Rob The Viking (co.)	2:22
7.	"Jacques Cousteau" (featuring DJ Makeway)	Bunting; Hendriks; Aaron Husdon; Hooper	Rob The Viking	3:20
8.	"Supernova" (featuring DJ Revolution)	Bunting; Hendriks; Kurt G. Hoffman; Hooper	Rob The Viking	3:06
9.	"Odd Goblins"	Bunting; Hendriks; Hooper	Rob The Viking	3:05
10.	"Park Bench"	Bunting; Hendriks; Hooper	Rob The Viking	3:01
11.	"Power"	Bunting; Hendriks; Hooper	Rob The Viking	3:20
12.	"Creature of Evil"	Bunting; Hendriks; Lanciani; Hooper	C-Lance; Rob The Viking (co.)	2:25
13.	"Jackson Pollock" (featuring DJ Makeway)	Bunting; Hendriks; Husdon; Hooper	Rob The Viking	2:19
14.	"Cold Sweat"	Bunting; Hendriks; Lanciani; Hooper	C-Lance; Rob The Viking (co.)	3:15
15.	"Still Kill"	Bunting; Hendriks; Hooper	Rob The Viking	3:23
Total length:				42:50

== Personnel ==
- Shane "Madchild" Bunting – songwriter, executive producer
- Kiley "Prevail" Hendriks – songwriter
- Robin "Rob The Viking" Hooper – songwriter, producer (tracks: 1-3, 5, 7-11, 13, 15), co-producer (tracks: 4, 6, 12, 14), recording, mixing, cover, design
- Dalla Hooper – additional vocals (track 5)
- Tim "Boom Bap" Proznick – live drums (track 5)
- Aaron "DJ Makeway" Husdon – songwriter (tracks: 7, 13)
- Kurt "DJ Revolution" Hoffman – songwriter (track 8)
- Craig "C-Lance" Lanciani – songwriter & producer (tracks: 4, 6, 12, 14)
- Kaj Falch-Neilsen – engineering (track 5)
- Tom Baker – mastering
- Ivory Daniel – executive producer
- Kevin Zinger – executive producer
- Alex Rauch – cover, design
- Dave Hamilton – photography

== Charts ==
Chart (2014)	Peak position
Canadian Albums (Billboard)	8
US Top Current Album Sales (Billboard)	146
US Heatseekers Albums (Billboard)	7
US Top Rap Albums (Billboard)	13
