= Citizen Kane (band) =

Canadian hip hop band

- Origin: Toronto, Ontario, Canada
- Genres: Canadian hip hop
- Years active: 1995–2005
- Label: Treehouse Records
- Past members: Jeff "J-Spade" Duke; Rob "Blye" Paris

Citizen Kane was a Canadian hip hop duo, active in the late 1990s and early 2000s. They were most noted as two-time Juno Award nominees for Rap Recording of the Year, for their EP The Epic at the Juno Awards of 1999 and their album Deliverance at the Juno Awards of 2000.

Raised in the public housing of Scarborough, Toronto, the group consisted of rappers Jeff "J-Spade" Duke, a first-generation Canadian, and Rob "Blye" Paris, a Black Nova Scotian; they were managed by Adrian Perry. Duke started in the music business as a dancer for Michie Mee and Dream Warriors.

They released their debut single, "Soul Survivor" in 1995, and followed up with a number of singles before releasing The Epic in 1997. They followed up with Deliverance in 1999; their efforts to promote Deliverance, in the face of Canadian hip hop's struggle to gain commercial and critical attention in that era, were filmed by Duke's sister Alison for the National Film Board of Canada documentary Raisin' Kane: A Rapumentary, which was released in 2001.

They released a couple of further singles after Deliverance, but broke up before releasing another album. In 2012, TopLeft Recordings released the mixtape Scartown Unreleased Classics, composed of tracks recorded by the group from 2001 to 2005, which were intended for a second album. Several of their singles, including "Soul Survivor", "Black Rain" and "Raisin' Kane", were reissued in 2018.

== Discography ==
- The Epic (1997)
- Deliverance (1999)
