= Armed to the Teeth (Swollen Members album) =

Studio album by Swollen Members
- Released: October 27, 2009
- Genre: Hip-hop
- Length: 1:06:35
- Labels: Battle Axe Records; Suburban Noize
- Producers: DJ Kemo; Karim Goldan; Metty the Dert Merchant; Moka Only; Rob the Viking; Roger Swan; Russ Kline; Spawn; Tre Nyce

Swollen Members chronology
| Black Magic (2006) | Armed to the Teeth (2009) | Dagger Mouth (2011) |

Singles from Armed to the Teeth
- 1. "Warrior" Released: August 25, 2009; 2. "Red Dragon" Released: September 8, 2009; 3. "Bollywood Chick" Released: October 2009

Armed to the Teeth is the fifth studio album by Canadian hip-hop group Swollen Members. It was released on October 27, 2009 by Battle Axe Records and Suburban Noize Records. Production was handled by Rob The Viking, Karim Goldan, DJ Kemo, Metty The Dert Merchant, Moka Only, Roger Swan, Russ Kline, Spawn and Tre Nyce. It features guest appearances from Tre Nyce, Young Kash, Barbie Hatch, Everlast, Glasses Malone, Krondon, Phil Da Agony, Saafir, Slaine, Talib Kweli and Tech N9ne.

The album debuted at number 146 on the Billboard 200, number 23 on the Independent Albums and number 5 on the Heatseekers Albums charts, selling 3,400 copies in the first week in the United States. It also entered the Billboard Canadian Albums at number 19.

It is their first release in three years, as the group had taken a break over the past few years while member Madchild dealt with drug addiction and legal issues. On August 25, 2009, the lead single, "Warrior", was released and peaked at number 94 on the Canadian Hot 100 chart. The second single "Red Dragon" was released on September 8. It was originally a solo Moka Only track from the 2002 album Monsters in the Closet, this version includes verses from Madchild and Prevail. Three days later, a music video for the lead single "Warrior" was released. On October 19, the full album became listenable on Swollen Members' MySpace page. The third single, "Bollywood Chick", was released around October and the music video was released on November 10 via Swollen Members' YouTube account. A music video for "Pornstar" was released in early 2010 via Swollen Members YouTube channel. In 2025, the album was released on vinyl for the first time, for Record Store Day.

== Critical reception ==
Professional ratings
Aggregate scores
| Source | Rating |
|---|---|
| Metacritic | 62/100 |
Review scores
| Source | Rating |
| AllMusic | 3/5 stars |
| The Boston Phoenix | 3/4 stars |
| HipHopDX | 2.5/5 |
| laut.de | 3/5 stars |
| Now | 1/5 Ns |
| RapReviews | 7.5/10 |
| Robert Christgau | (dud) |

At Metacritic, which assigns a normalized rating out of 100 to reviews from mainstream publications, the album received an average score of 62 based on four reviews.

AllMusic's David Jeffries gave it a mixed review, claiming: "fans hungry for SM material won't mind at all, since after three years a redundant track beats no track, and while all of it seems familiar, the crew deliver the material with new life, suggesting they're mad happy to be back on the grind".

Chris Faraone of The Boston Phoenix wrote "at the core of any Swollen Members project--and Armed to the Teeth, their first in three years, is no exception--is a clean, uncomplicated spread of kaleidoscopic semi-pop bangers from producer Rob the Viking".

Paul Terefenko of Now stated "the newest disc from the once-innovative Vancouver group assaults you with 18 contrived, lazy tracks. The best is a seven-year-old re-release, 'Red Dragon', from when Moka Only gave this outfit some class".

Emanuel Wallace of RapReviews praised the album, saying "the members were certainly armed, and they seem to hit more than they miss".

== Track listing ==
| No. | Title | Writer(s) | Producer(s) | Length |
|---|---|---|---|---|
| 1. | "Reclaim the Throne" (featuring Tre Nyce and Young Kazh) | Shane Bunting; Kiley Hendriks; Trumaine Lecesne; Brandon Doran; Robin Hooper | Rob The Viking | 3:21 |
| 2. | "Pornstar" (featuring Tre Nyce) | Bunting; Hendriks; Lecesne; Hooper; Christopher Leigh | Rob The Viking | 3:22 |
| 3. | "Kyla" | Bunting; Hendriks; Hooper; Kyla LeBlanc | Rob The Viking | 3:29 |
| 4. | "Bollywood Chick" (featuring Tech N9NE and Tre Nyce) | Bunting; Hendriks; Aaron D. Yates; Lecesne; Hooper; Karim Goldan | Rob The Viking; Karim Goldan | 3:09 |
| 5. | "Red Dragon" | Bunting; Hendriks; Daniel Denton | Moka Only | 4:46 |
| 6. | "Meltdown" | Bunting; Hendriks; Hooper | Rob The Viking | 3:08 |
| 7. | "My Life" | Bunting; Hooper | Rob The Viking | 4:36 |
| 8. | "Bang Bang" (featuring Tre Nyce and Young Kazh) | Bunting; Hendriks; Lecesne; Doran; Hooper | Rob The Viking | 4:38 |
| 9. | "Here We Come" | Bunting; Hendriks; Hooper | Rob The Viking | 3:14 |
| 10. | "Warrior" (featuring Tre Nyce and Young Kazh) | Bunting; Hendriks; Lecesne; Doran; Hooper; Leigh | Rob The Viking | 4:50 |
| 11. | "Certified Dope" | Bunting; Hendriks; Hooper | Rob The Viking | 3:30 |
| 12. | "Funeral March" (featuring Saafir and Barbie Hatch) | Bunting; Hendriks; Reggie Gibson; Barbie Hatch; Hooper; Russ Kline | Rob The Viking; Roger Swan; Russ Kline | 3:51 |
| 13. | "Flyest" (featuring Tre Nyce) | Bunting; Hendriks; Lecesne; Hooper | Rob The Viking; Tre Nyce | 3:34 |
| 14. | "Lonely One" | Bunting; Hendriks; Cristian Bahamonde; O. Sinclair; Kline | DJ Kemo; Spawn | 3:27 |
| 15. | "Crossfire" (featuring Krondon, Talib Kweli, Phil Da Agony and Tre Nyce) | Hendriks; Marvin Jones; Talib Kweli Greene; Jason Smith; Lecesne; Bryan Trevitt; Hooper | Metty The Dert Merchant; Rob The Viking | 2:44 |
| 16. | "Concerto" | Bunting; Hendriks; Hooper | Rob The Viking | 2:28 |
| 17. | "Dumb" (featuring Everlast, Slaine and Tre Nyce) | Bunting; Erik Schrody; George Carroll; Lecesne; Hooper | Rob The Viking | 3:35 |
| 18. | "Real P.I." (featuring Tre Nyce and Glasses Malone) | Bunting; Lecesne; Charles Penniman; Goldan | Karim Goldan | 4:53 |
| Total length: | | | | 1:06:35 |

== Personnel ==
- Shane "Madchild" Bunting – vocals, executive producer
- Kiley "Prevail" Hendriks – vocals
- Daniel "Moka Only" Denton – producer
- Robin "Rob The Viking" Hooper – producer, engineering
- Trumaine "Tre Nyce" Lecesne – vocals, producer
- Brandon "Young Kazh" Doran – vocals
- Aaron D. "Tech N9NE" Yates – vocals
- Reggie "Saafir" Gibson – vocals
- Barbie Hatch – vocals
- Marvin "Krondon" Jones – vocals
- Talib Kweli – vocals
- Jason "Phil Da Agony" Smith – vocals
- Erik "Everlast" Schrody – vocals
- George "Slaine" Carroll – vocals
- Charles "Glasses Malone" Penniman – vocals
- Christopher "CJ The Prodigy" Leigh – guitar
- Kyla "Kytami" LeBlanc – electric violin
- Russ Kline – guitar, producer
- "DJ Itchy Ron" Mejia – scratches
- Elmo Chong – violin, cello
- Roy Chong – violin, cello
- Karim Goldan – producer, engineering
- Roger Swan – producer, engineering, mixing
- Cristian "DJ Kemo" Bahamonde – producer, engineering, mixing
- O. "Spawn" Sinclair – producer, engineering
- Bryan "Metty The Dert Merchant" Trevitt – producer, engineering
- Richard "Segal" Huredia – mixing
- Mike Kumagai – mixing
- Kevin Zinger – executive producer, management
- Brad "Daddy X" Xavier – executive producer
- Casey Quintal – art direction, design
- Shock Mansion – skull design
- Fabrice Henssens – photography
- Ivory Daniel – management
- Josh Eldridge – management

== Charts ==
| Chart (2009) | Peak position |
|---|---|
| Canadian Albums (Billboard) | 19 |
| US Billboard 200 (Billboard) | 146 |
| US Independent Albums (Billboard) | 23 |
| US Heatseekers Albums (Billboard) | 5 |
