= Swollen Members =

Canadian hip hop group

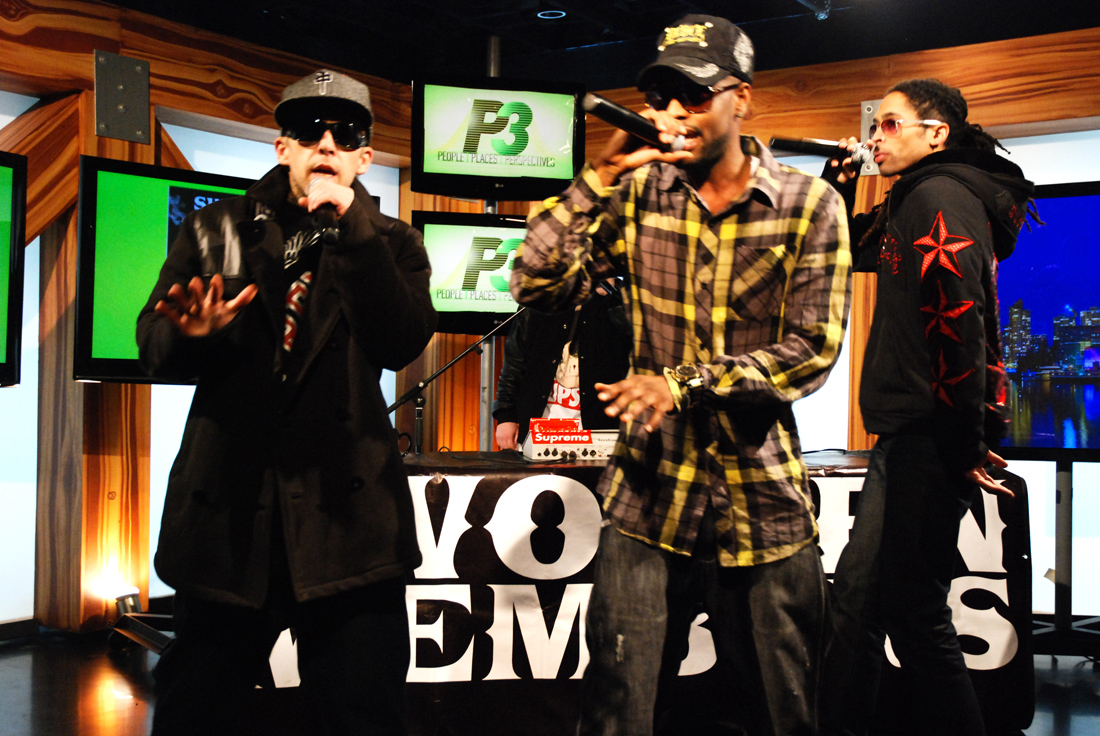
- Swollen Members in 2010; Madchild (left), Tre Nyce (center), Prevail (right)

Background information
- Origin: Vancouver, British Columbia, Canada
- Genres: Hip-hop; alternative hip-hop
- Years active: 1996–present
- Labels: Battle Axe Records, PCP Productions, Suburban Noize, Virgin Records
- Members: Madchild; Prevail; Rob The Viking
- Past members: Zodak; Moka Only
- Website: battleaxerecords.net
- Logo

Swollen Members is a Canadian hip-hop group from Vancouver, British Columbia, consisting of rappers Madchild and Prevail, and producer Rob the Viking. Former group members include Zodak and Moka Only. Swollen Members have released eight studio albums, three compilation albums, two greatest hits albums, and one live album.

== History ==
=== Foundation and single releases ===
The group was founded in 1996 by rappers Madchild and Prevail. The duo had chemistry while rapping together at a house party and formed the group. The name Swollen Members was suggested by Moka Only, who later joined the group in the early 2000’s. The name, which is a double entendre for a large crew and a sexual innuendo, was later listed as one of the worst rapper names by Complex and Cracked.

The group released four 12-inch vinyl singles from 1997 to 1999 on Madchild's indie label Battle Axe Records, initially distributed by New York-based Fat Beats. The singles sold approximately 10,000 copies each.

=== 1999-2000: Balance ===
In 1999, the group released their debut album Balance, with features from Evidence and Rakaa of Dilated Peoples, Aceyalone, Del the Funky Homosapien, Divine Styler, Everlast, Saafir, and Son Doobie. The album peaked at number 40 on Canadian alternative albums, earned Gold status by the CRIA and won Rap Recording of the Year at the Juno Awards of 2001. They also won the Most Played New Group Award at the Canadian Radio Music Awards in 2001.

=== 2001–2002: Bad Dreams ===
Following Balance, Swollen Members released their second album Bad Dreams on November 13, 2001. It includes guest appearances from Buc Fifty, Chali 2na, Evidence, Moka Only, Planet Asia, Rakaa, and Son Doobie. The album peaked at number 34 on the Canadian Albums Chart, and placed on multiple Canadian year-end charts in 2002. In 2002, Bad Dreams was the seventh-best-selling rap album in Canada and the best-selling rap album in Canada by a Canadian artist. The album also earned Platinum status by the CRIA, and won Rap Recording of the Year at the Juno Awards of 2002. The song "Fuel Injected" (featuring Moka Only) won four MuchMusic Video Awards. "Bring It Home" became the group's highest-charting song, peaking at number three on the Canadian singles chart. At the 2002 West Coast Music Awards, it won Album of the Year.

=== 2002–2003: Monsters in the Closet ===
Swollen Members album Monsters In the Closet is a collection of B-sides, outtakes and three newly produced songs, released in 2002. The album brought group membership for Moka Only and producer Rob The Viking. The album debuted at number 7 on the Canadian albums chart, and placed on multiple Canadian year-end charts in 2002. The album also earned a Gold certification from the CRIA, and won the group their third consecutive Rap Recording of the Year Award at the 2003 Juno Awards. The song "Breath" (featuring Nelly Furtado) won Best Rap Video at the 2003 MuchMusic Video Awards. At the 2003 Western Canadian Music Awards, "Breath" won Video of the Year and the album won in the Outstanding Rap/Hip-Hop Recording category. In January 2003, Swollen Members signed a deal with Virgin Records. However, they never released anything with the label.

=== 2003–2004: Heavy ===
In 2003, the group released their third studio album Heavy, with guest appearances from Abstract Rude and Son Doobie. It debuted at number 14 on the Canadian Albums Chart. The album includes Moka Only on every song, for the first time. After the release, he left the group and continued his solo career. At the 2004 Western Canadian Music Awards, the album won in the Outstanding Rap/Hip-Hop Recording category.

=== 2006–2007: Black Magic ===
In 2006, Swollen Members released their fourth studio album, Black Magic. It features guest appearances from Evidence, Alchemist, Barbie Hatch, Casual, Everlast, Ghostface Killah, Mr. Vegas, Phil Da Agony, Planet Asia, Sick Jacken, DJ Revolution, DJ Babu, DJ Swamp, and Moka Only. Later that year, the group lost their distribution deal with Nettwerk due to Madchild's affiliation with the Hells Angels. The album peaked at number 22 in Canada, number 21 on the US Billboard Independent Albums and number 19 on the Heatseekers Albums charts. The album also went on to win the group their fourth Rap Recording of the Year Award at the Juno Awards of 2007.

=== 2009–2010: Armed to the Teeth, Greatest Hits ===
Armed to the Teeth was released October 27, 2009, by Battle Axe Records and Suburban Noize Records. Featured artists on the album include La Coka Nostra, Talib Kweli, Tech N9ne, Tre Nyce, and a return of Moka Only on the previously released track, "Red Dragon". This release was followed by a North American tour with the Australian hip-hop group Bliss 'n' Eso.

In 2010, Swollen Members released their first greatest hits album titled Greatest Hits: Ten Years of Turmoil, which reached number 110 on the Canadian Albums Chart.

=== 2011–2012: Dagger Mouth and Monsters II ===
Swollen Members released their sixth album, Dagger Mouth in April 2011, with the label Suburban Noize. The first single was "Mr. Impossible", followed by "Bring Me Down" which features rapper Saigon. The album was nominated for Rap Recording of the Year at the Juno Awards of 2012. It won Rap/Hip-Hop Recording of the Year at the 2012 Western Canadian Music Awards.

A compilation album titled Monsters II was released on August 2, 2011. In December 2011, the group released another compilation album titled 1997. The album includes songs recorded in the late 1990s, some of which first appeared on the Europe/United Kingdom release of their debut album Balance.

=== 2013: Beautiful Death Machine ===
On March 19, 2013, their seventh studio album, Beautiful Death Machine was released, featuring guest appearances from Heavy Metal Kings, Slaine, Esoteric, Celph Titled, Apathy and Snak the Ripper. The album debuted at number three on the Canadian Albums Chart, making it the group's highest-charting in Canada.

=== 2014: Brand New Day ===
On June 17, 2014, the group released their eighth studio album Brand New Day. In mid-February 2015, Madchild was listed on the King of the Dot BO5 card against the battle rapper by the stage name of Daylyt.

=== 2018: "Bank Job" and other projects ===
In 2018, the Swollen Members single "Bank Job" was released, followed by several solo releases by Madchild and Prevail and Rob the Viking's new project XL The Band.

In 2021, Swollen Members released a single and music video for "Tetris" featuring Neph. Since then, Madchild has been focused on solo releases, and Prevail and Rob the Viking have been focused on XL The Band. In 2022, the group released a second greatest hits album titled The Best Of.

== Musical style ==
Their music is influenced by punk rock and heavy metal. Matt Conaway of AllMusic said their debut album Balance was "at the forefront of developing a new style" and they have been called "a bridge between punk rock and hip-hop". The Rough Guide called them "two of the most innovative people in hip-hop". The group was known for their "medieval" wordplay and references to vikings, warlocks, wizards, Dungeons & Dragons and Conan the Barbarian.

== Cultural impact ==
The groups music and style has been heavily connected to extreme sports culture, primarily skating and snowboarding. In 1994, Madchild released his debut single "Pressure" with producer and skateboarder Tommy Guerrero. In 2001, the group made their first appearance at the World Ski and Snowboard Festival, and have since been performed at the event more than any other group. In 2002, Swollen Members performed at Molson Snow Jam. The bonus disc of their 2003 album Heavy includes skateboarding footage of Colin McKay, Danny Way and others. In 2004, DC Shoes released a limited edition "Manteca" shoe for the group. In 2005, their music was featured in the Billabong surfing video "Passion Pop". Their music was featured in multiple Mack Dawg Productions snowboarding videos, including "The Resistance", and "True Life", which were sold with a bonus compilation CD of Battle Axe Records songs. Their music was also featured in the 2002 compilation album Circa Presents… and two Red Dragon skate videos "RDS / FSU / 2002" and "Skateboard Party". In 2006, screenings of "Skateboard Party" played before their shows. Their music is also in the video games Mat Hoffman's Pro BMX 2 and SSX 3.

== Legacy ==
Swollen Members are the best-selling Canadian hip-hop group in Canada of all time. From 1996 to 2016, they were the second best-selling Canadian hip-hop artist in Canada. They have won four Juno Awards, including three in a row from 2001-2003. Aaron Zorgel of Complex credited the group as "the defining sound of Canadian rap between the years 2000-2002". Complex also ranked the group number 4 in their list of "Canadians Who Shaped Canadian Hip-Hop: Northern Touch To The 2000s". The group was ranked number 10 in a 2010 list of "Best Canadian Rappers of All Time" by Global News.

== Group members ==
Current members

- Madchild – (1996–present) - rapper
- Prevail – (1996–present) - rapper
- Rob the Viking – (2002–present) - producer

Former members

- Zodak – (1996–1999) - DJ, producer
- Moka Only – (2002–2003) - rapper, producer

== Discography ==
=== Studio albums ===
List of studio albums, with selected chart positions and certifications
Title	Album details	Peak chart positions				Certifications
Title	Album details	CAN	U.S.	U.S. Heat	U.S. Ind.	Certifications
Balance	Released: May 31, 1999; Label: Battle Axe Records, Jazz Fudge	–	–	–	–	CRIA: Gold
Bad Dreams	Released: November 13, 2001; Label: Battle Axe Records	34	–	–	–	CRIA: Platinum
Heavy	Released: November 18, 2003; Label: Battle Axe Records	14	–	–	–	
Black Magic	Released: September 12, 2006; Label: Battle Axe Records	22	–	19	21	
Armed to the Teeth	Released: October 27, 2009; Label: Battle Axe Records, Suburban Noize	19	146	5	23	
Dagger Mouth	Released: April 12, 2011; Label: Battle Axe Records, Suburban Noize	15	–	3	41	
Beautiful Death Machine	Released: March 19, 2013; Label: Battle Axe Records, Suburban Noize	3	167	3	26	
Brand New Day	Released: June 17, 2014; Label: Battle Axe Records	8	–	7	–	

=== Compilation albums ===
Title	Album details	CAN	Certifications
Monsters in the Closet	Released: November 12, 2002; Label: Battle Axe Records	7	CRIA: Gold
Monsters II	Released: August 2, 2011; Label: Battle Axe Records, Suburban Noize	-	
1997	Released: December 6, 2011; Label: Suburban Noize	-	

=== Greatest hits albums ===
Title	Album details	CAN
Greatest Hits: Ten Years of Turmoil	Released: March 16, 2010; Label: Battle Axe Records, Suburban Noize	110
The Best Of	Released: November 4, 2022; Label: Battle Axe Records, Suburban Noize	-

=== Live albums ===
Title	Album details
Live at the Fox Theatre	Released: November 16, 2018; Label: Battle Axe Records

=== Singles ===
Year	Title	Peak chart positions	Album
Year	Title	CAN	Album
1997	"Shatterproof"	—	Balance
1998	"S + M on the Rocks"	—	Balance
1999	"Front Street"	—	Balance
1999	"Strength"	—	Balance
2000	"Lady Venom"	—	Balance
2000	"Camouflage"	—	Bad Dreams
2001	"Full Contact/Take It Back"	—	Bad Dreams
2002	"Fuel Injected" (featuring Moka Only)	—	Bad Dreams
2002	"Bring It Home" (featuring Moka Only)	3	Bad Dreams / Monsters in the Closet
2002	"Temptation"	—	Monsters in the Closet
2003	"Watch This"	—	Heavy
2006	"Black Magic" (featuring DJ Swamp)	—	Black Magic
2006	"Too Hot" (featuring DJ Babu)	—	Black Magic
2006	"Put Me On" (featuring Everlast and Moka Only)	—	Black Magic
2009	"Warrior" (featuring Tre Nyce and Young Kazh)	94	Armed to the Teeth
2009	"Red Dragon"	—	Armed to the Teeth
2009	"Bollywood Chick" (featuring Tech N9ne and Tre Nyce)	—	Armed to the Teeth
2011	"Mr. Impossible"	—	Dagger Mouth
2011	"Bring Me Down (Remix)" (featuring Saigon)	—	Dagger Mouth
2013	"Kings of Diamonds"	—	Beautiful Death Machine
2013	"Mercenary"	—	Beautiful Death Machine
2013	"Inception"	—	Beautiful Death Machine
2013	"Almost Famous"	—	Beautiful Death Machine
2018	"Bank Job"	—	TBA (2018)
2024	"Triple Aces"	—	TBA (2024)
2024	"Faceless Kings"	—	TBA (2024)
"—" denotes releases that did not chart

=== Guest appearances ===
List of non-single guest appearances, with other performing artists, showing year released and album name
Year	Title	Other artist(s)	Album
2001	"The High Road"	—N/a	One Big Trip
2002	"Planet Alignment"	Buc Fifty	Bad Man
2002	"Chewing Concrete"	DJ Murge	Search and Rescue
2003	"Get Live"	Abstract Rude & Tribe Unique	Showtyme!
2003	"Summer Lightning"	Mr Brady	Dirty
2004	"Warriors"	Fat Jack	Cater to the DJ 2
2007	"Artillery"	Infected Mushroom	Vicious Delicious
2012	"Lost in the Music"	Insane Clown Posse	Mike E. Clark's Extra Pop Emporium
2013	"Falling Down"	Twiztid	A New Nightmare
2015	"The Plague"	Prozak, Ubiquitous	Black Ink
2016	“Fun House”	Robbie G	Inner Outer Space

=== Music videos ===
Year	Song	Director(s)	Album
2000	"Lady Venom"	Trevor Cornish	Balance
2001	"Take It Back"	Wendy Morgan	Bad Dreams
2001	"Deep End"	Jason Goldwatch	Bad Dreams
2002	"Fuel Injected"(featuring Moka Only)	Wendy Morgan	Bad Dreams
2002	"Bring It Home" (featuring Moka Only)	Wendy Morgan	Bad Dreams
2002	"Steppin Thru"	Wendy Morgan	Monsters in the Closet
2002	"Breath" (featuring Nelly Furtado)	Todd McFarlane	Monsters in the Closet
2003	"Watch This"		Heavy
2006	"Too Hot"		Black Magic
2006	"Put Me On" (feat. Everlast)	Margaret Malandruccolo	Black Magic
2006	"Pressure"		Black Magic
2009	"Warrior" (feat. Young Kazh)	Chad Archibald & Philip Carrer	Armed to the Teeth
2009	"Bollywood Chick" (feat. Tech N9ne)		Armed to the Teeth
2010	"Pornstar"	Chad Archibald & Philip Carrer	Armed to the Teeth
2011	"Mr. Impossible"	Mr. Invisible	Dagger Mouth
2011	"Bring Me Down (Remix)" (feat. Saigon)	Mr. Invisible	Dagger Mouth
2011	"Night Vision"		Dagger Mouth
2011	"Do or Die"		Dagger Mouth
2013	"King of Diamonds"	D-Shot	Beautiful Death Machine
2013	"Mercenary"	D-Shot	Beautiful Death Machine
2013	"Inception"	D-Shot	Beautiful Death Machine
2013	"Almost Famous"	D-Shot	Beautiful Death Machine
2013	"BAX WAR"	D-Shot	Beautiful Death Machine
2013	"Death Warrant"	D-Shot	Beautiful Death Machine
2013	"Fear" (feat. Snak the Ripper)	D-Shot	Beautiful Death Machine
2013	"Juggernaut"		Beautiful Death Machine
2014	"Power"		Brand New Day
2014	"Brand New Day"	Dale Resteghini	Brand New Day

== Awards and nominations ==
=== Canadian Radio Music Awards ===
Awards and nominations for Swollen Members
Year	Award	Result	Ref(s)
2001	Most Played New Group	Won	

=== Juno Awards ===
Awards and nominations for Swollen Members
Year	Award	Result	Ref(s)
2001	Best Rap Recording Balance	Won	
2002	Best Rap Recording Bad Dreams	Won	
2003	Rap Recording of the Year Monsters In The Closet	Won	
2003	Group of the Year	Nominated	
2007	Rap Recording of the Year Black Magic	Won	
2012	Rap Recording of the Year Dagger Mouth	Nominated	

=== MTV Video Music Awards ===
Awards and nominations for Swollen Members
Year	Award	Result	Ref(s)
2002	International Viewer's Choice: Canada feat. Moka Only "Fuel Injected"	Nominated	

=== MuchMusic Video Awards ===
Awards and nominations for Swollen Members
Year	Award	Result	Ref(s)
2001	Best Independent Video "Lady Venom"	Won	
2001	Best Rap Video "Lady Venom"	Nominated	
2002	Best Rap Video feat. Moka Only "Fuel Injected"	Won	
2002	Best Independent Video feat. Moka Only "Fuel Injected"	Won	
2002	VideoFACT Award feat. Moka Only "Fuel Injected"	Won	
2002	Best Director Wendy Morgan Pardo (director) feat. Moka Only "Fuel Injected"	Won	
2002	Best Video feat. Moka Only "Fuel Injected"	Nominated	
2002	Best Cinematography feat. Moka Only "Fuel Injected"	Nominated	
2003	Best Rap Video feat. Nelly Furtado "Breath"	Won	
2003	Best Video feat. Nelly Furtado "Breath"	Nominated	
2003	Best Independent Video feat. Nelly Furtado "Breath"	Nominated	
2003	Peoples Choice: Favourite Canadian Group feat. Nelly Furtado "Breath"	Nominated	

=== Western Canadian Music Awards ===
Awards and nominations for Swollen Members
Year	Award	Result	Ref(s)
2002	Album of the Year Bad Dreams	Won	
2003	Outstanding Rap/Hip Hop Recording Monsters In The Closet	Won	
2003	Video of the Year feat. Nelly Furtado "Breath"	Won	
2004	Outstanding Rap/Hip Hop Recording Heavy	Won	
2012	Outstanding Rap/Hip Hop Recording Dagger Mouth	Won	

== See also ==
- Canadian hip hop
- Music of Canada
- List of songs recorded by Swollen Members
