= Black Magic (Swollen Members album) =

Studio album by Swollen Members
- Released: September 12, 2006
- Genre: Hip-hop
- Length: 1:08:21
- Label: Battle Axe Records
- Producers: DJ Kemo; Double Dragon; Evidence; Madchild; Prevail; Rob The Viking; Squeak E. Clean; The Alchemist; Vago

Swollen Members chronology
Heavy (2003)	Black Magic (2006)	Armed to the Teeth (2009)

Singles from Black Magic
- 1. "Black Magic" Released: 2006; 2. "Too Hot" Released: 2006; 3. "Put Me On" Released: 2006

Black Magic is the fourth studio album by Canadian hip-hop group Swollen Members. It was released on September 12, 2006 by Battle Axe Records, with distribution from TVT Records.

Recording sessions took place at Battle Axe Studios and The Warehouse in Vancouver, Crack Alley Studios in Los Angeles, Mr. Vegas Studio in Kingston, Soundproof West in Venice, Westlake Recording Studios in Hollywood, and various hotel rooms across America.

Production was handled by members Rob The Viking, Madchild and Prevail, as well as Evidence, DJ Kemo, Alchemist, Double Dragon, Squeak E. Clean and Vago, with co-producers Roger Swan, Metty The Dert Merchant and The Corn Gang.

It features guest appearances from Evidence, Alchemist, Barbie Hatch, Casual, Everlast, Ghostface Killah, Mr. Vegas, Phil Da Agony, Planet Asia, Sick Jacken, DJ Revolution, DJ Babu, DJ Swamp, and former member Moka Only, who contributed on two songs.

The album peaked at number 22 in Canada, number 21 on the US Billboard Independent Albums and number 19 on the Heatseekers Albums charts. At the Juno Awards of 2007, the album won Rap Recording of the Year. In 2008, the album's title track was remixed by Drake and JD Era.

== Critical reception ==
Professional ratings
Review scores
Source	Rating
AllHipHop	3/5 stars
AllMusic	3.5/5 stars
musicOMH	3/5 stars
MVRemix	8/10
Now	3/5 Ns
Okayplayer	3/5 stars
PopMatters	5/10
RapReviews	9/10
Visions	8/12

Alex Thornton of AllHipHop noted a "lack of direction" throughout the album, stating "while the two are vocally distinct, their lyrics are more or less interchangeable and sometimes too complex for their own good." He said "Rob the Viking’s beats feel like uneven attempts to catch on to the Linkin Park audience."

Marisa Brown of AllMusic stated "Black Magic isn't quite as strong as the group's first two albums, but it's a step forward, aggressive and confident, with consistently strong production".

Del F. Cowie of Exclaim! said the production of the album "creates a dark mood while simultaneously being poppy" and praised the group's hit making prowess.

MVRemix expressed the album featured "traditional Swollen sound" as well as "catchy mainstream sounds". He explained "Songs like "Dark Clouds" keep that backpack rapper sound, while "Dynamite" has that club sound with a Middle Eastern twist blended with a Reggae-Dancehall vibe." He also noted "catchy pianos" and "distinctive drum patterns" on the tracks "So Deadly" and "Prisioner of Doom."

Jason Richards of Now called the album "a successful return to the dark form that won them the underground fan base".

Sean Kantrowitz of Okayplayer noted "minor key piano-based tracks dominate the majority of the album" and "the album truly clicks and conveys that sense of heaviness when it lets up a little".

Mike Schiller of PopMatters expressed that the album was "fine (at least for a while, until Mad Child fatigue sets in)". He said Rob the Viking was "one of the best constantly-mid-tempo producers".

Pedro Hernandez of RapReviews noted "the group uses dark themes as metaphors instead of going for the shock-rap route" and praised the album's production. He said it was "probably the best underground album I’ve peeped this year next to JMT's latest".

Hiphop in je smoel expressed that despite its name, the album lacked the "dark sound" of the group's "most rated" albums. He said "Good tracks are certainly on this CD, but they are too often interspersed with total misses".

Zlatan Alihodzic of Visions stated "the balancing act between entertainment and ambition succeeds, the result is half a dozen of unintrusive, almost perfect rap anthems."

== Track listing ==
No.	Title	Writer(s)	Producer(s)	Length
1.	"Intro"	Shane Bunting; Robin Hooper	Rob The Viking; Madchild	0:40
2.	"Blackout"	Bunting; Kiley Hendriks; Cristian Bahamonde; Hooper	DJ Kemo; Rob The Viking	1:47
3.	"Swamp Water" (featuring Phil Da Agony, Planet Asia and DJ Revolution)	Bunting; Jason Smith; Jason Green; Michael Perretta	Evidence	3:35
4.	"Pressure"	Bunting; Hendriks; Bahamonde	DJ Kemo; Rob The Viking (co.)	3:23
5.	"Press Forward (Interlude)"	Bunting; Hendriks; Hooper	Rob The Viking; Madchild; Prevail	0:28
6.	"Grind"	Bunting; Hendriks; Daniel Denton; Hooper	Rob The Viking	3:14
7.	"Torture" (featuring Casual and DJ Revolution)	Bunting; Hendriks; Jonathan Owens; Hooper	Rob The Viking	3:37
8.	"So Deadly" (featuring Evidence)	Bunting; Perretta	Evidence	3:58
9.	"Weight" (featuring Ghostface Killah and The Alchemist)	Bunting; Hendriks; Dennis Coles; Alan Maman	The Alchemist	3:47
10.	"Prisoner of Doom"	Bunting; Hendriks; Hooper; Bryan Trevitt	Rob The Viking; Metty The Dert Merchant (co.); Roger Swan (co.)	4:12
11.	"Heart"	Bunting; Hendriks; Hooper	Rob The Viking	3:06
12.	"Too Hot" (featuring DJ Babu)	Bunting; Hendriks; Hooper; Kenneth Gonzalez; Gabriel Roth	Rob The Viking	3:33
13.	"Dark Clouds" (featuring Evidence)	Bunting; Perretta	Evidence	4:55
14.	"Ritual"	Chris Gestrin		0:37
15.	"Massacre"	Bunting; Hendriks; Hooper	Rob The Viking; Roger Swan (co.)	3:41
16.	"Go to Sleep" (featuring Barbie Hatch)	Bunting; Hendriks; Barbie Hatch; Sam Spiegel	Squeak E. Clean; The Corn Gang (co.)	4:32
17.	"Sinister" (featuring Sick Jacken)	Bunting; Hendriks; Jack Gonzalez; Hooper	Rob The Viking; Roger Swan (co.)	4:19
18.	"Dynamite" (featuring Mr. Vegas)	Bunting; Hendriks; Clifford Smith; D. Orellana; Bahamonde	Vago; DJ Kemo (co.)	3:03
19.	"Put Me On" (featuring Everlast)	Bunting; Hendriks; Denton; Erik Schrody; Perretta	Evidence	4:05
20.	"Black Magic" (featuring DJ Swamp)	Bunting; Hendriks; Hooper	Rob The Viking	3:58
21.	"Brothers"	Bunting; Hendriks; Elmo Chong; Roy Chong	Double Dragon	3:51
Total length:				1:08:21

== Personnel ==
- Shane "Madchild" Bunting — vocals (tracks: 1–13, 15–21), producer (tracks: 1, 5), executive producer
- Kiley "Prevail" Hendriks — vocals (tracks: 2, 4–7, 9–12, 15–21), producer (track 5)
- Daniel "Moka Only" Denton — vocals (tracks: 6, 19)
- Robin "Rob The Viking" Hooper — drums (track 17), producer (tracks: 1, 2, 5–7, 10–12, 15, 17, 20), co-producer (track 4), recording (tracks: 1–7, 9, 11, 12, 16, 18, 20), mixing (track 5)
- Jason "Phil Da Agony" Smith — vocals (track 3)
- Jason "Planet Asia" Green — vocals (track 3)
- Jonathan "Casual" Owens — vocals (track 7)
- Michael "Evidence" Perretta — vocals (tracks: 8, 13), producer & recording (tracks: 3, 8, 13, 19)
- Dennis "Ghostface Killah" Coles — vocals (track 9)
- Mia Harris — vocals (track 15)
- Barbie Hatch — vocals (track 16)
- Jack "Sick Jacken" Gonzalez — vocals (track 17)
- Clifford "Mr. Vegas" Smith — vocals & recording (track 18)
- Erik "Everlast" Schrody — vocals & guitar (track 19)
- Bryan "Metty The Dert Merchant" Trevitt — backing vocals (track 6), co-producer (track 10)
- Elmo Chong — backing vocals, strings, producer & recording (track 21)
- Roy Chong — backing vocals, strings, producer & recording (track 21)
- Chi Turner — backing vocals (track 21)
- Kurt "DJ Revolution" Hoffman — scratches (tracks: 3, 7, 13)
- Russ Kline — guitar (track 6)
- Darcy Ladret — guitar (track 8), bass (track 13)
- Bryant Olender — piano (tracks: 10, 15)
- Chris Gestrin — organ (track 10), mini moog (track 17)
- Kyla Tamiko "Kytami" LeBlanc — violin (tracks: 10, 15)
- Fin Manish — cello (tracks: 10, 15)
- Chris "DJ Babu" Oroc — scratches (track 12)
- Jeff Babko — Wurlitzer organ & clavinet (track 13)
- Kevin Coles — guitar (track 17)
- Keefus Ciancia — piano, bass & strings (track 19)
- Ronald K. "DJ Swamp" Keys Jr. — scratches (track 20)
- Cristian "DJ Kemo" Bahamonde — producer (tracks: 2, 4), co-producer (track 18)
- Alan "The Alchemist" Maman — producer & recording (track 9)
- Sam "Squeak E. Clean" Spiegel — producer & recording (track 16)
- D. "Vago" Orellana — producer (track 18)
- Roger Swan — co-producer (tracks: 10, 15, 17), recording (tracks: 10, 14, 15), mixing (tracks: 4, 6, 7, 10, 15, 17)
- The Corn Gang — co-producers (track 16)
- Richard "Segal" Huredia — mixing (tracks: 2, 3, 8, 9, 11–13, 16, 18–21)
- Jason Rankins — engineering assistant (tracks: 3, 8, 13, 20)
- Amy Worobec — engineering assistant (tracks: 4, 6)
- Mike Cashin — mixing assistant (tracks: 10, 15), engineering assistant (track 17)
- Dan Okano — mixing assistant (track 15)
- Sean Tallman — engineering assistant (track 19)
- Bernie Grundman — mastering
- Marcello De Cotiis — executive producer
- Chris Allen — art direction
- Mark Gainor — art direction
- Graham Winterbottom — sleeve photo

== Charts ==
Chart (2006)	Peak position
Canadian Albums (Jam!)	22
US Independent Albums (Billboard)	21
US Heatseekers Albums (Billboard)	19
