= Bad Dreams (Swollen Members album) =

Studio album by Swollen Members
- Released: November 13, 2001
- Studio: Hipposonic Studios
- Genre: Hip-hop
- Length: 59:59 (original); 67:47 (reissue)
- Label: Battle Axe Records
- Producers: Nucleus, Evidence, Rob the Viking, the Alchemist, Seanski, Roger Swan, Joey Chavez, Concise, Kemo, Saukrates

Swollen Members chronology
Balance (1999)	Bad Dreams (2001)	Monsters in the Closet (2002)

Singles from Bad Dreams
- 1. "Camouflage" Released: 2000; 2. "Full Contact/Take It Back" Released: 2001; 3. "Fuel Injected" Released: 2002; 4. "Bring It Home" Released: 2002

Bad Dreams is the second studio album by the Canadian hip-hop group Swollen Members, released on November 13, 2001, by Battle Axe Records.

The album was produced by Nucleus, Evidence, Rob the Viking, the Alchemist, Seanski, Roger Swan, Joey Chavez, Concise, Kemo, Saukrates, and features guest appearances from DJ Revolution, DJ Babu, Evidence, Chali 2na, Rakaa, Buc Fifty, Rattlesnake Jones, Chris Guy, Planet Asia, Son Doobie and Moka Only.

"Camouflage" and the double A-side "Full Contact/Take It Back" were the album's first singles. The next single, "Fuel Injected" (featuring Moka Only) reached number 1 on the MuchMusic Top 30 Countdown and won four MuchMusic Video Awards. The final single "Bring It Home", which also featured Moka Only, topped the MuchMusic Countdown and peaked at number 3 on the Canadian singles chart.

The album peaked at number 34 on the Canadian Albums Chart. In 2002 Bad Dreams was the seventh best-selling rap album in Canada, and the best-selling rap album in Canada by a Canadian artist. The album was certified platinum by the CRIA with sales of over 100,000 copies across Canada, and won Rap Recording of the Year at the Juno Awards of 2002. At the 2002 West Coast Music Awards, it won Album of the Year.

Two bonus tracks were added to the 2002 reissue. In 2016, the album was reissued again on CD with new cover art by the graffiti artist RISK.

== Critical reception ==
Professional ratings
Review scores
Source	Rating
AllMusic	4.5/5 stars
Chronic'art	4/5
HipHopCore	4/5 stars
HipHopDX	3.5/5 stars
MVRemix	8/10
Now	5/5 Ns
RapReviews	7/10

Bad Dreams was the top album in Exclaim's 2001 readers poll. In CMJ New Music Report's 2001: year in review, Jim Utz listed the album in his top 10. Arturo Perez of Kludge magazine named it one of the 25 best albums of 2001.

Nic Kincaid of AllMusic called it "a natural and overwhelmingly positive evolution from Balance", praising the album's production and collaborative tracks.

Larry LeBlanc of Billboard stated "Though Balance was impressive, the new album shows that Swollen Members has evolved into a mature pairing. While its predecessor sounded as if it consisted of solo artists collaborating on a project, Bad Dreams features a collection of concise, conceptual songs."

Chart Attack praised both rappers and the album's production, noting "beats range from wigged-out Wu-Tang weirdness to smooth old-school".

MVRemix said the album "features a nice selection of dope tracks. Beautifully smooth, scratched-up hooks, perfect production and the well assembled duo".

Despite highly rating the album, Matt Galloway of Now expressed that distributing the album with Nettwerk was an "unusual decision" and "massive gamble" due to their little experience with hip-hop artists.

Matthias Jost of RapReviews claimed the duo was "sometimes a little bit too basic". He stated the group was "a few notable notches below" Dilated Peoples, and compared them to Cali Agents.

The album received generally positive reviews from French publications Chronic'art and HipHopCore, as well as Deutsch publications Hiphop in je smoel and Visions.

== Track listing ==
No.	Title	Producer(s)	Length
1.	"Intro"		0:42
2.	"Killing Spree"	Nucleus	2:38
3.	"Full Contact" (featuring Evidence and Chali 2na)	Evidence	4:09
4.	"Take It Back" (featuring DJ Revolution)	Rob the Viking	3:41
5.	"RPM" (featuring Rakaa Iriscience and DJ Babu)	Nucleus	4:01
6.	"Bad Dreams"	The Alchemist	3:50
7.	"Camouflage" (featuring DJ Revolution)	Evidence	2:31
8.	"Poker Face" (featuring Buc Fifty)	Rob the Viking	4:20
9.	"Deep End"	Seanski	3:25
10.	"Anthrax Island"	Nucleus	2:30
11.	"Snake Bite" (featuring Rattlesnake Jones and Chris Guy)	Rob the Viking, Roger Swan	3:43
12.	"Total Package" (featuring Planet Asia and DJ Revolution)	Evidence	3:19
13.	"The Reflection"	Rob the Viking	1:58
14.	"Ventilate" (featuring DJ Babu)	Joey Chavez	3:56
15.	"Burns and Scars" (featuring Son Doobie)	Rob the Viking	4:05
16.	"Dark Riders" (featuring Buc Fifty)	The Alchemist	3:20
17.	"Fuel Injected" (featuring Moka Only)	Concise, Kemo	3:31
18.	"High Road"	Rob the Viking	*4:20
Total length:			59:59

Bonus tracks (2002 reissue)
No.	Title	Producer(s)	Length
19.	"Bring It Home" (featuring Moka Only)	Rob the Viking	4:17
20.	"Fuel Injected" (Remix) (featuring Moka Only and Saukrates)	Saukrates	3:31
Total length:			67:47

== Charts ==
Chart (2002)	Peak position
Canadian Albums (Jam!)	34

Year-end chart performance for Bad Dreams
Chart (2002)	Position
Canadian Albums (Nielsen SoundScan)	87
Canadian R&B Albums (Nielsen SoundScan)	16
Canadian Rap Albums (Nielsen SoundScan)	7
