= Battle Axe Records =

Independent record label

- Parent company: Regime Music Group
- Founded: 1996
- Founder: Shane Bunting
- Distributors: Nettwerk (CAN, 1999-2005); Caroline (US, 1999-2005)
- Genre: Hip-hop
- Country of origin: Canada
- Location: Vancouver, British Columbia
- Official website: www.battleaxerecords.net

Battle Axe Records is an independent hip-hop record label based in Vancouver, British Columbia, Canada. It was founded by Shane Bunting (Madchild of Swollen Members) in 1996. The label also has multiple releases with sub-label Underworld Inc.

== History ==
The first releases by the label were four 12-inch singles by Swollen Members from 1997 to 1999, leading up to their debut album Balance. The singles were distributed by New York-based Fat Beats and sold approximately 10,000 copies each.

The label released albums for Canadian artists BrassMunk, Moka Only, Oddities and Sweatshop Union; California-based artists Abstract Rude, Buc Fifty, LMNO, DJ Drez, Evidence, Fat Jack, Mr. Brady, P.E.A.C.E, Planet Asia, Son Doobie and Sunspot Jonz; and New York-based artists Freestyle and Shabazz the Disciple.

=== Compilations ===
In addition to albums released for several artists, the label released ten compilation albums, three of which were included as a bonus CD for Mack Dawg Productions snowboarding videos.

The first compilation album titled Defenders of the Underworld was released in 1999. The album featured many artists that primarily worked with other labels including Aceyalone, The Alchemist, Arsonists, Defari, Del the Funky Homosapien, Dilated Peoples, Divine Styler, Everlast, Kool Keith, KutMasta Kurt, Non Phixion, Pep Love, and Psycho Realm; and artists that continued working with Battle Axe Records including Buc Fifty, Evidence, Moka Only, Mr. Brady, Son Doobie, and Swollen Members.

In 2000, the label released their second compilation album titled Battle Axe Warriors, which introduced Abstract Rude and LMNO to the label.

In 2001, the label released their third compilation album titled Lyrics of Fury.

Two more Battle Axe Warriors albums were released in 2002 and 2003, and two more Lyrics of Fury albums were released in 2003 and 2004.

=== Distribution, hiatus and additional releases ===
The label was distributed by Nettwerk in Canada and Caroline in the United States from 1999 to 2005. In 2006, the label lost their distribution deal with Nettwerk due to Madchild's affiliation with the Hells Angels.

Following a hiatus in 2007 and 2008, Swollen Members returned in 2009 with the album Armed to the Teeth, released by Battle Axe and Suburban Noize Records. Madchild and Prevail also released solo EPs in the same year.

Swollen Members continued working as the main artist of the label until 2015, when they released an album by Demrick and Cali Cleeve, as well as multiple EPs by Bukshot. In 2019, they released an album by Adlib.

=== Awards and nominations ===
Aside from Swollen Members four wins, other Battle Axe Records albums have received nominations at the Juno Awards for Rap Recording of the Year. In 2004, Dark Sunrise by BrassMunk and Natural Progression by Sweatshop Union each received nominations. In 2006, Sweatshop Union was nominated for the album United We Fall. In 2012, Dagger Mouth by Swollen Members was nominated. In 2013, Dope Sick by Madchild was nominated.

Three of the labels albums were nominated for Outstanding Rap/Hip-Hop Recording at the Western Canadian Music Awards in 2004, Natural Progression by Sweatshop Union, Lowdown Suite by Moka Only, and Heavy by Swollen Members, which won the award.

== Discography ==
Released with Underworld Inc.*

Abstract Rude & Tribe Unique

- P.A.I.N.T (2001)
- Showtyme! (2003)

Adlib

- Primitive Tomorrow (2019)

BrassMunk

- Dark Sunrise (2002)

Buc Fifty

- Bad Man (2002)
- Serve The Devil, Praise The Lord (2004)

Bukshot

- Freak Show EP (2015)
- Run EP (2015)
- Assimilation EP (2016)
- Helter Skelter: The Hunter EP (2016)

Chase Phoenix

- Cut To The Chase (2004)*

Code Name: Scorpion

- Code Name: Scorpion (2001)

Demrick and Cali Cleve

- Losing Focus (2015)

DJ Drez

- The Capture of Sound (2003)

DJ Murge

- Search and Rescue (2002)

Evidence

- Yellow Tape Instrumentals (2003)

Fat Jack

- Cater To The DJ 2 (2004)

Freestyle

- Etched In Stone (2004)

Joey Chavez

- Music From The Connection (2001)

LMNO

- Leave My Name Out (2001)

Madchild

- The Mad Child EP (2009)
- Banned From America EP (2011)
- King of Pain EP (2011)
- Little Monster EP (2012)
- Dope Sick (2012)
- Lawn Mower Man (2013)
- Switched On EP (2014)
- Silver Tongue Devil (2015)
- The Darkest Hour (with Evidence) (2017)
- Demons (2019)

Moka Only

- Lime Green (2001)
- Moka Only is… Ron Contour (2001)*
- Flood (2002)*
- Lowdown Suite (2003)
- The Desired Effect (2005)

Mr. Brady

- Dusty Baker (2002)*
- Dirty (2003)

P.E.A.C.E

- Megabite (2004)

Oddities

- The Scenic Route (2003)*

Perfect Strangers

- Moka Only + Madchild are… Perfect Strangers EP (2001)

Planet Asia

- The Medicine (2006)

Prevail

- Baseball Bats and Nails EP (2009)
- Spacefase EP (with Ol' City Rocker) (2012)

Rob the Viking

- Beats To Pillage And Conquer By (2003)

Shabazz the Disciple

- The Book of Shabazz (Hidden Scrollz) (2003)

Son Doobie

- Funk Superhero (2003)
- Doobie Deluxe (2004)

Sunspot Jonz

- Don’t Let Em Stop You (2003)

Sweatshop Union

- local.604 (2002)*
- Natural Progression (2003)
- United We Fall (2005)

Swollen Members

- Balance (1999)
  - Instrumentals (2001)
- Bad Dreams (2001)
  - Instrumentals (2001)
- Monsters in the Closet (2002)
  - Instrumentals (2002)
- Heavy (2003)
  - Instrumentals (2003)
- Black Magic (2006)
- Armed to the Teeth (2009)
- Greatest Hits: Ten Years of Turmoil (2010)
- Monsters II (2011)
- Dagger Mouth (2011)
- Beautiful Death Machine (2013)
- Brand New Day (2014)
- Live at the Fox Theatre (2018)
- The Best Of (2022)

Compilations

- Defenders of the Underworld (1999)
- Battle Axe Warriors (2000)
- Lyrics Of Fury (2001)*
- Battle Axe Warriors II (2002)
- Battle Axe Warriors III (2003)
- Lyrics Of Fury 2 (2003)*
- Lyrics Of Fury 3 (2004)*

Bonus disc compilations (Note: Included as bonus CD with the following Mack Dawg Productions VHS/DVDs)

- The Resistance (2000)
- True Life (2001)
- Nixon Jibfest (2002)

DJ battle breaks

- DJ Revolution - You Need New Breaks (1999)
- DJ Revolution - Coffee Breaks (2001)
- DJ Science - Pizza Breaks (2003)
- DJ Kemo - Lab Rat Breaks
- DJ Dingle Balls - Battle Break Deez Nuts
- Alvin's Assfuzz - Battle Break Deez Nuts Volume Two
- Joey Chavez - Battle Axe Breaks Volume One-Three
- Louie Fangs, Top 2 Bot'm, Rock Steady Crew - Zowaxe

== See also ==
- List of record labels
- List of hip-hop record labels
- Underground hip hop
