= BrassMunk =

Canadian hip hop group

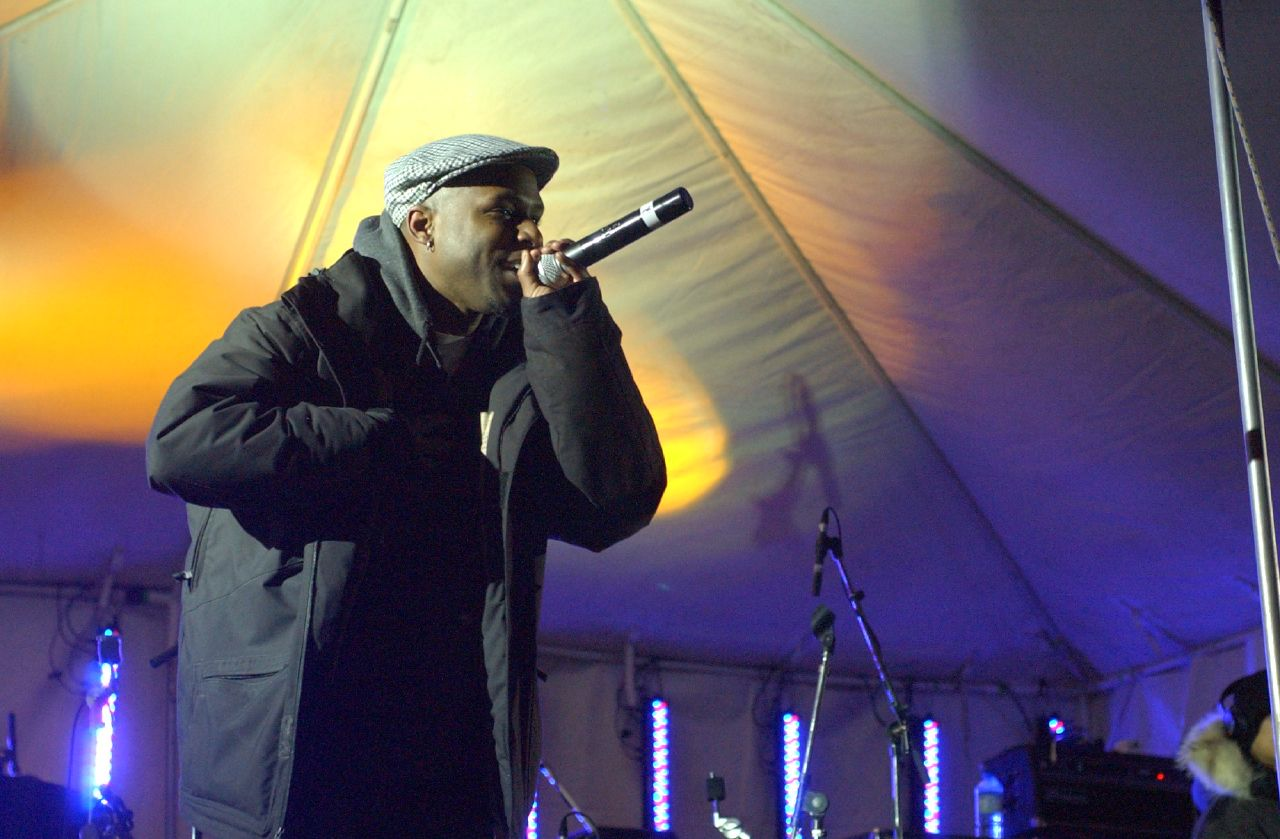
- Brassmunk at Polar Jam, Waterloo, Ontario Jan, 2007

Background information
- Origin: Scarborough, Ontario, Canada
- Genre: Canadian hip hop
- Years active: 1997–2008
- Labels: 54th; Virgin Music Canada; Battle Axe; EMI; Audio Research; Heavy Headz
- Members: S-Roc; Clip; Agile; May One 9 King Reign†
- Website: Official Website

BrassMunk was a Canadian hip hop group from Scarborough, Ontario. It was formed in 1997 by emcees S-Roc (Dwayne King), Clip (Jason Balde), May One 9 (Randy Brookes) and DJ/producer Agile (Ajene Griffith). May One 9 was replaced by King Reign (Kai Thomas) in 2006.

Brassmunk independently released their first EP (variations on the singles "One, 2" and "Stop, Look, Listen") in 1999. Their title track from their second EP, Live Ordeal!, received a Juno nomination for Rap Recording of the Year. The track "El Dorado", from their 2002 EP, also received a Juno nomination for Rap Recording of the Year.

Also in 2002, they released the EP Dark Sunrise. The following year, Dark Sunrise was re-released worldwide on Battle Axe Records as an LP, and included their previous independent releases. Dark Sunrise was nominated for Rap Recording of the Year at the Juno Awards of 2004. Their follow-up album, FEWturistic, was released on March 20, 2007, and featured several additional artists including Kardinal Offishall and Moka Only. In 2008, the album earned them another Juno nomination.

The band's best known singles are "Big", produced by Mr. Attic of Da Grassroots and "Oh Supaman", produced by Agile and based in part on samples from Laurie Anderson's 1981 single "O Superman (For Massenet)".

BrassMunk has been inactive since 2008. Reign died of a heart attack in 2016, at age 40.

== Discography ==
Albums

- Dark Sunrise (2003), Battle Axe Records, Fifty Fourth Music
- FEWturistic (2007), EMI Music Canada, Fifty Fourth Music

EPs

- One, 2 / Stop, Look, Listen (1999), Independent
- Live Ordeal! (2000), Audio Research Records
- Push Up / Get Right (Bring It) (2001), Heavy Headz Entertainment
- Dark Sunrise (2002), Virgin Music Canada, 54th Regiment Records
- El Dorado / Big (2002), 54th Regiment Records

Singles

- "Spider Rider's Theme Song" (2007)

== Award nominations ==
- Juno Awards of 2001
  - Best Rap Recording - "Live Ordeal!" (Nominated)
- Juno Awards of 2003
  - Rap Recording of the Year - "El Dorado" (Nominated)
- Juno Awards of 2004
  - Rap Recording of the Year - Dark Sunrise (Nominated)
- Juno Awards of 2008
  - Rap Recording of the Year - FEWturistic (Nominated)
