= Bring It On Home =

Bring It On Home may refer to:

- Bring It On Home (album), a 2012 album by Joan Osborne
- "Bring It On Home" (Sonny Boy Williamson II song), a 1963 blues song, later reworked by Led Zeppelin
- "Bring It On Home" (Little Big Town song)
- "Bring It On Home", a Kix Brooks song from New to This Town
- "Bring It On Home to Me", a 1962 song first recorded by Sam Cooke
