= Freaks of Reality =

Former hip hop group

Freaks of Reality was a hip hop group from Toronto, Ontario, best known for their 1995 Juno Award-nominated song, "Chi-Litchi-Latchi-Low". There is no record of band member names.

== History ==
The group's first single, "Chi-Litchi-Latchi-Low", produced by 2rude was released by Steppin Bigga Records. It received regular rotation on Much Music. The band hosted The Mix and Rap City.

"Chi-Litchi-Latchi-Low" was nominated for a 1995 Juno Award for Best Rap Recording. Not long after the Junos, Steppin Bigga Records went out of business, and then started a new label with the producer 2rude named Ill Vibe/Rudimental Productions (which became 2rude’s Rudimental Records) by 2rude.
