= MuchMusic Video Award for Best Independent Video =

The following is a list of the MuchMusic Video Awards winners for Best Independent Video. As of 2008 this award has become defunct and has merged with the VideoFACT Award as one award.

== Winners ==
Year	Artist	Video
1993	Furnaceface	"She Thinks She's Fat"
1994	DSK	"Target"
1995	Sunfish	"Difference"
1996	Huevos Rancheros	"Rockin' In The Hen House"
1997	B.T.K.	"Superchile"
1998	Serial Joe	"Skidrow"
1999	Infinite	"Take A Look"
2000	Saukrates	"Money Or Love"
2001	Swollen Members	"Lady Venom"
2002	Swollen Members f. Moka Only	"Fuel Injected"
2003	Not By Choice	"Now That You Are Leaving"
2004	Pilate	"Into Your Hideout"
2005	Alexisonfire	"Accidents"
2006	Metric	"Poster of a Girl"
2007	Cancer Bats	"French Immersion"
