= Beautiful Death Machine =

Studio album by Swollen Members
- Released: March 19, 2013
- Recorded: 2012–2013
- Genre: Hip-hop
- Length: 45:01
- Labels: Battle Axe Records; Suburban Noize
- Producers: Rob The Viking; C-Lance; Aspect

Swollen Members chronology
Dagger Mouth (2011)	Beautiful Death Machine (2013)	Brand New Day (2014)

Beautiful Death Machine is the seventh studio album by Canadian hip-hop group Swollen Members. The album was released on March 19, 2013, by Battle Axe Records and Suburban Noize Records. The album debuted at number 167 on the Billboard 200 chart, with first-week sales of 3,000 copies in the United States.

== Critical reception ==
Professional ratings
Aggregate scores
Source	Rating
Metacritic	70/100
Review scores
Source	Rating
AllMusic	3.5/5 stars
Exclaim!	5/10
HipHopDX	3/5 stars
RapReviews	(7.5/10)

At Metacritic, which assigns a normalized rating out of 100 to reviews from mainstream publications, the album received an average score of 70 based on four reviews.

David Jeffries of AllMusic highlighted the posse cuts "Death To You" and "Colossal Beats" as standout tracks and called the album a "busy, word-filled, and winning effort".

Chris Dart of Exclaim! criticized the group for "rapping about rap". He wrote "technically speaking, Swollen Members are better now than they've ever been, but a decade-and-a-half in, they need to find new material".

Steve Juon of RapReviews said "it's a dark and eerie backdrop with heavy pianos and equally heavy lyrics from Madchild", who he claimed was a "very polarizing rapper in terms of his pitch and delivery". He expressed "the Members ring all the right bells in a pugilistic display of Canadian hip-hop".

== Track listing ==
No.	Title	Producer(s)	Length
1.	"Inception"	Aspect	4:19
2.	"Death to You" (featuring Heavy Metal Kings & Slaine)	C-Lance	4:31
3.	"Bax War"	C-Lance	3:45
4.	"King of Diamonds"	Rob The Viking	3:03
5.	"Juggernaut"	Rob The Viking	3:28
6.	"The Difference"	Rob The Viking	3:37
7.	"River Monster"	C-Lance	4:17
8.	"Mercenary"	Rob The Viking	2:26
9.	"Colossal Beasts" (featuring Esoteric, Celph Titled & Apathy)	C-Lance	3:54
10.	"Almost Famous"	Rob The Viking	4:01
11.	"Death Warrant"	C-Lance	3:58
12.	"Fear" (featuring Snak the Ripper)	C-Lance	3:43

== Charts ==
Chart (2013)	Peak position
US Billboard 200	167
US Heatseekers Albums (Billboard)	3
US Independent Albums (Billboard)	26
Canadian Albums (Billboard)	3
