= Balance (Swollen Members album) =

- Canada release cover

Studio album by Swollen Members
- Released: May 31, 1999
- Recorded: 1997–1999
- Studios: NRG, North Hollywood, California
- Genre: Hip-hop
- Length: 68:32 (CA and US); 78:15 (EU and UK)
- Labels: Battle Axe Records; Jazz Fudge
- Producers: Kool DJ E.Q., the Alchemist, Paul Nice, Zodak, Evidence, Kemo, Joey Chavez, Del tha Funkee Homosapien

Swollen Members chronology
Balance (1999)	Bad Dreams (2001)

Alternate Cover
- United Kingdom release cover

Singles from Balance
- 1. "Shatterproof" Released: 1997; 2. "S + M on the Rocks" Released: 1998; 3. "Front Street" Released: 1999; 4. "Strength" Released: 1999; 5. "Lady Venom" Released: 2000

Balance is the debut studio album by Canadian hip-hop group Swollen Members. It was released in 1999 by Battle Axe Records in Canada and United States with 18 tracks, and with DJ Vadim's Jazz Fudge label in Europe and United Kingdom with 20 tracks.

The album was produced by Kool DJ E.Q., the Alchemist, Paul Nice, Zodak, Evidence, Kemo, Joey Chavez, Del tha Funkee Homosapien, and features guest appearances from Evidence, Rakaa, Aceyalone, Del the Funky Homosapien, Divine Styler, Everlast, Saafir, and Son Doobie.

The album was certified gold by the CRIA with sales of over 50,000 copies across Canada, and won Rap Recording of the Year at the Juno Awards of 2001. The album also reached number 40 on Canada's Alternative Albums chart in 2001. In 2016, the album was reissued on CD with new cover art by the graffiti artist RISK.

== Critical reception ==
Professional ratings
Review scores
Source	Rating
AllMusic	4/5 stars
Robert Christgau	(2-star Honorable Mention)
MVRemix	8/10
RapReviews	8/10

CMJ New Music Monthly stated "they hold more stylistic and geographic allegiance to San Francisco and Los Angeles than to more logical locales like Seattle and Olympia" and noted the group's "defiantly independent aesthetic".

Matt Conaway of AllMusic said "their chemistry is very developed for a group embarking on their freshman effort" and claimed the duo was "at forefront of developing a new style".

MVRemix praised the duos chemistry and the album's production. They called it "one of the year's finest albums and is one of the best debut albums ever".

RapReviews expressed "guest appearances aren't irritating and overbearing, but blend and fit nicely in the mix" and said "it stumbles here and there, but the consistent dopeness of the beats, and overall vibe of the album override that".

Phalanx of Rebirth Magazine named the album his favorite of all-time.

== Track listings ==
Canada and United States
No.	Title	Producer(s)	Length
1.	"Ground Breaking"	Kool DJ E.Q.	3:55
2.	"Strength"	The Alchemist	2:52
3.	"Lady Venom"	Paul Nice	4:15
4.	"Front Street"	The Alchemist	3:36
5.	"Bless + Destroy"	Zodak	3:20
6.	"Counter Parts" (featuring Rakaa Iriscience and Evidence)	Evidence	4:33
7.	"Circuit Breaker"	The Alchemist	3:18
8.	"Out of Range"	Zodak	4:01
9.	"Bottle Rocket" (featuring Divine Styler, Everlast and Evidence)	Evidence	3:48
10.	"Assault + Battery"	Zodak	2:53
11.	"Valentine's Day Massacre" (featuring Big Nous, Saafir and Thirdrail Vic)	Kemo	3:55
12.	"S+M on the Rocks"	Joey Chavez	3:36
13.	"Committed" (featuring Son Doobie)	Kemo	2:57
14.	"Left Field" (featuring Del the Funkee Homosapien and Unicron)	Del tha Funkee Homosapien	5:16
15.	"Horrified Nights"	The Alchemist	4:03
16.	"Battle Axe Experiment" (featuring Evidence)	Zodak	3:07
17.	"Consumption" (featuring Aceyalone)	Evidence	4:50
18.	"Sinful Bliss"	Paul Nice	4:17
Total length:			68:32

Europe and United Kingdom
No.	Title	Producer(s)	Length
1.	"Front Street"	The Alchemist	3:36
2.	"Out of Range"	Zodak	4:01
3.	"Consumption" (featuring Aceyalone)	Evidence	4:50
4.	"Lady Venom"	Paul Nice	4:15
5.	"Shatterproof"	Evidence	4:23
6.	"Bless + Destroy"	Zodak	3:20
7.	"My Advice"	Evidence	3:55
8.	"Brace Yourself"	Zodak	3:34
9.	"Circuit Breaker"	Evidence	3:18
10.	"Strength"	The Alchemist	2:52
11.	"Sunburn"	Zodak	3:08
12.	"Left Field" (featuring Del the Funkee Homosapien and Unicron)	Del tha Funkee Homosapien	5:16
13.	"Bottle Rocket" (featuring Divine Styler, Everlast and Evidence)	Evidence	3:48
14.	"Horrified Nights"	The Alchemist	4:03
15.	"Valentine’s Day Massacre" (featuring Big Nous, Saafir and Thirdrail Vic)	Kemo	3:55
16.	"Battle Axe Experiment" (featuring Evidence)	Zodak	3:07
17.	"Forceful" (featuring Mr. Brady and Tony De Skitzo)	Zodak	5:48
18.	"Committed" (featuring Son Doobie)	Kemo	2:57
19.	"Counter Parts" (featuring Rakaa Iriscience and Evidence)	Evidence	4:33
20.	"S + M on the Rocks"	Joey Chavez	3:36
Total length:			78:15

== Charts ==
Chart (2001)	Position
Canadian Alternative Albums (Nielsen SoundScan)	40

Chart (2002)	Position
Canadian Alternative Albums (Nielsen SoundScan)	138
Canadian R&B Albums (Nielsen SoundScan)	81
Canadian Rap Albums (Nielsen SoundScan)	42
