= Prevail (rapper) =

Canadian rapper

- Born: Kiley Hendriks; November 4, 1975 (age 50)
- Genre: Hip-hop
- Occupations: Rapper; songwriter
- Years active: 1992-present
- Label: Battle Axe Records
- Member of: Split Sphere; Swollen Members; XL the Band
- Formerly of: Alpha Omega; Code Name: Scorpion
- Website: http://www.xltheband.com/

Kiley Hendriks (born November 4, 1975), better known by his stage name Prevail, is a Canadian rapper, based in Vancouver, British Columbia. He is the founder of the hip-hop group Swollen Members with Madchild.

== Personal life ==
At the age of 17 he dated singer Nelly Furtado. After Prevail stopped contacting her, she wrote many songs, describing it to Vice as her "first puppy love heartbreak". She also said "he helped birth the R&B singer in me". The pair later collaborated on the Swollen Members track "Breath".

== Career ==
In 1991, he formed the hip-hop group Split Sphere with Moka Only. In 1993, the duo moved to San Diego before he moved to Vancouver. In 1995 he was featured on an episode of RapCity, which showcased Vancouver hip-hop. In 1996, he founded the hip-hop group Swollen Members with Madchild. The group has released eight studio albums, three compilation albums, two greatest hits albums, and one live album. They are the best-selling Canadian hip-hop group in Canada of all time and won the Juno Award four times.

Aside from Swollen Members, Prevail released an album entitled Code Name: Scorpion with Abstract Rude and Moka Only in 2001, his first solo EP Baseball Bat and Nails in 2009, and a second solo EP with producer Ol' City Rocker titled Spasefase in 2012. His 2014 freestyle on Sway in the Morning was ranked by HotNewHipHop in their list of "The 10 Best Five Fingers Of Death Freestyles". Prevail then started Alpha Omega - a new group teaming up with his nephew Cory Joseph (a.k.a. Neph) - in 2015. The duo released 3 EPs together before joining forces with Rob The Viking and Dr. Liesa Norman to form XL The Band. XL The Band has released dozens of jazz/ hip hop leaning singles since 2019. In 2026, he released an EP titled Witness the Splitness with Moka Only as Split Sphere.

== Discography ==
Solo

- Baseball Bat & Nails EP - February 10, 2009
- Spasefase EP - January 10, 2012

Code Name: Scorpion

- Code Name: Scorpion - August 7, 2001

XL the Band

- Opus No. 1 - April 3, 2020

Split Sphere

- Witness the Splitness EP - September 29, 2026

== Awards ==
*All awards won with Swollen Members*

=== Juno Awards ===
- 2001 - Best Rap Recording (Balance)
- 2002 - Best Rap Recording (Bad Dreams)
- 2003 - Rap Recording of the Year (Monsters in the Closet)
- 2007 - Rap Recording of the Year (Black Magic)

=== MuchMusic Video Awards ===
- 2001 - Best Independent Video - “Lady Venom”
- 2002 - Best Rap Video - "Fuel Injected" (ft. Moka Only)
- 2002 - Best Director - "Fuel Injected" (ft. Moka Only)
- 2002 - VideoFACT Award - "Fuel Injected" (ft. Moka Only)
- 2002 - Best Independent Video - "Fuel Injected" (ft. Moka Only)
- 2002 - Peoples Choice: Favorite Canadian Group
- 2003 - Best Rap Video - "Breathe" (ft. Nelly Furtado)

=== Western Canadian Music Awards ===
- 2003 - Outstanding Rap/Hip-Hop Recording (Monsters in the Closet)
- 2003 - Video of the Year - “Breathe” (ft. Nelly Furtado)
- 2004 - Outstanding Rap/Hip-Hop Recording (Heavy)
