= Western Canadian Music Awards =

Annual music awards event

- Sponsored by: Western Canada Music Alliance
- Country: Canada
- First award: 2003
- Website: breakoutwest.ca

The Western Canadian Music Awards (WCMAs) is an annual awards event for music in the western portion of Canada. The awards are provided by the Western Canada Music Alliance, which consists of six member music industry organizations from British Columbia, Alberta, Saskatchewan, Manitoba, Yukon, and The Northwest Territories.

The Western Canadian Music Awards presentation gala takes place on the final evening of the Breakout West music conference & festival, which takes place in a different Western Canadian city each year.

== History ==
The Western Canadian Music Awards originated in its current form in 2003. Prior to that the Prairie Music Alliance (formed in May 1999) hosted award events at the "Prairie Music Week", while BC and Yukon held their own music awards known as the "West Coast Music Awards". The earliest incarnation of the Awards was the "All Indie Weekend" festivals held in Alberta, Saskatchewan and Manitoba from 1995 through 1999.

The Western Canadian Music Awards have been held in the following cities:

- 2003 - Regina, Saskatchewan
- 2004 - Calgary, Alberta
- 2005 - Vancouver, British Columbia
- 2006 - Winnipeg, Manitoba
- 2007 - Moose Jaw, Saskatchewan
- 2008 - Edmonton, Alberta
- 2009 - Brandon, Manitoba
- 2010 - Kelowna, British Columbia
- 2011 - Whitehorse, Yukon
- 2012 - Regina, Saskatchewan
- 2013 - Calgary, Alberta
- 2014 - Winnipeg, Manitoba
- 2015 - Victoria, British Columbia
- 2016 - Regina, Saskatchewan
- 2017 - Edmonton, Alberta
- 2018 - Kelowna, British Columbia
- 2019 - Whitehorse, Yukon
- 2020 - Winnipeg, Manitoba
- 2021 - Winnipeg, Manitoba
- 2022 - Calgary, Alberta
- 2023 - Kelowna, British Columbia
- 2024 - Saskatoon, Saskatchewan

== BreakOut West conference and festival ==
BreakOut West weekend is a place where the music industry gathers to celebrate, develop, and support the best of Western Canadian Music. The BreakOut West Festival features some of the finest talent from all genres of music from B.C, Alberta, Manitoba, the Yukon, and the Northwest Territories. The daytime conference component of Breakout West features panels, workshops, one-on-one mentoring sessions, and networking events to provide opportunities for artists and other industry people to learn and network.

Mission Statement: "To stage an event in Western Canada that unites, promotes, develops, and educates independent labels, artists, and managers. The Western Canadian Music Alliance will further stimulate the public's interest in awareness of the live, original and independent music from Canada's western provinces."

== See also ==
- Music of Canada
