= Evidence discography =

- Studio albums: 7
- EPs: 1
- Mixtapes: 3
- Instrumental tapes: 5

This is the discography of Evidence, a California-based rapper and record producer. He has released 7 studio albums, 1 extended play, 3 mixtapes, 5 instrumental tapes and produced 11 albums for other artists.

== Studio albums ==
Year	Album details	Peak chart positions		
Year	Album details	US	US R&B	US Ind.
2005	Another Sound Mission Vol. 1: Released: March 12, 2005; Label: Audio Fidelity; Format: CD	—	—	—
2007	The Weatherman LP: Released: March 20, 2007; Label: ABB; Format: CD, LP, digital download	—	—	42
2011	Cats & Dogs: Released: September 27, 2011; Label: Rhymesayers; Format: CD, LP, digital download	64	10	9
2014	Lord Steppington (with The Alchemist): Released: January 21, 2014; Label: Rhymesayers; Format: CD, LP, digital download	60	14	15
2018	Weather or Not: Released: January 26, 2018; Label: Rhymesayers; Format: CD, LP, digital download	187	—	9
2021	Unlearning Vol. 1: Released: June 25, 2021; Label: Rhymesayers; Format: CD, LP, digital download	—	—	—
2025	Unlearning Vol. 2: Released: August 15, 2025; Label: Rhymesayers; Format: CD, LP, digital download	—	—	—
"—" denotes releases that did not chart.

== EPs ==
- The Layover EP (2008)

== Mixtapes ==
- Storm Watch Mixtape (2007)
- The Layover Mixtape (2008)
- I Don't Need Love (Evidence vs. The Beatles) (2010)

== Instrumental tapes ==
- Yellow Tape Instrumentals (2004)
- Red Tape Instrumentals (2007)
- The Purple Tape Instrumentals (2008)
- Green Tape Instrumentals (2013)
- Squirrel Tape Instrumentals, Vol. 1 (2019)

== Singles ==
Year	Song	Album
2007	"Mr. Slow Flow"	The Weatherman LP
2007	"All Said & Done" (featuring Kobe)	The Weatherman LP
2010	"To Be Continued..."	Cats & Dogs
2011	"You"	Cats & Dogs

== Guest appearances ==
- Red Foo & Dre Kroon - "The Freshest" from Balance Beam (1997)
- Jizzm High Definition - "Based on Principle" from Illasophic Vol. 1 (1998)
- Defari - "Focused Daily" from Focused Daily (1998)
- Joey Chavez - "Reservation for One" (1998)
- Swollen Members - "Bottle Rocket" from Balance (1999)
- The High & Mighty - "Top Prospects" from Home Field Advantage (1999)
- Mr. Brady - "Skills" from Defenders of the Underworld (1999)
- Shaya 'Encore' Bekele - "Filthy" from Self-Preservation (2000)
- Swollen Members - "Full Contact" from Bad Dreams (2001)
- Joey Chavez - "People and Places" (2001)
- Linkin Park - "H! Vltg3" from Reanimation (2002)
- Defari - "Los Angelinos" from Odds & Evens (2003)
- Phil da Agony - "Fingerprints" (2003)
- L.A. Ment - "Undisputables" (2004)
- Lyrics Born - "Pack Up (Remix)" from Same !@$ Different Day (2005)
- F.I.L.T.H.E.E. Immigrants - "Find Us (Remix)" (2005)
- Swollen Members - "So Deadly" and "Dark Clouds" from Black Magic (2006)
- Statik Selektah - "Time to Say Goodbye" from Spell My Name Right: The Album (2007)
- The Away Team - "Sum of Me" from Training Day (2007)
- Jake One - "White Van" from White Van Music (2008)
- Tassho Pearce - "Return to the Basics" (2008)
- Fashawn - "Our Way" from Boy Meets World (2009)
- Alchemist - "Therapy" from Chemical Warfare (2009)
- O.S.T.R. - "Real Game" from O.c.b. (2009)
- DJ Muggs - "Classical" from Soul Assassins: Intermission (2009)
- CunninLynguists - "Running Wild" from Strange Journey Volume Two (2009)
- Rakaa - "Aces High" from Crown of Thorns (2010)
- Statik Selektah - "The Coast" from 100 Proof: The Hangover (2010)
- Strong Arm Steady - "True Champs" from In Search of Stoney Jackson (2010)
- Gangrene - "Wassup Wassup" from Gutter Water (2010)
- Cypress Hill - "Pass the Dutch" from Rise Up (2010)
- 7L & Esoteric - "Drawbar 1-2" from 1212 (2010)
- Joe Scudda - "Think About It" from Not Your Average Joe (2010)
- Grimaso - "Movement" from Let The Beat Come True (2010)
- Phonte - "The Life of Kings" from Charity Starts at Home (2011)
- Shuko - "Same Ol Line" from Foundation Vol. 2 Instrumental EP (2011)
- Alchemist - "Never Grow Up" from Russian Roulette (2012)
- Action Bronson - "Bitch, I Deserve You" from Rare Chandeliers (2012)
- Oh No - "Real Serious" from Ohnomite (2012)
- Copywrite - "Golden State (of Mind)" from God Save the King (2012)
- Gangrene - "Dark Shades" from Vodka & Ayahuasca (2012)
- Awar - "Never Break Me" from The Laws of Nature (2012)
- Concise Kilgore - "Teknoir" from Kobain (2012)
- Lirico - "Suave (Smooth Operator)" from Un Antes Y Un Después (2012)
- Roc Marciano - "Love Means" from Marci Beaucoup (2013)
- Durag Dynasty - "Spiral Event" from 360 Waves (2013)
- Statik Selektah - "My Hoe" from Extended Play (2013)
- Notes to Self - "Nobody" from Target Market (Recoil) (2013)
- LMNO - "All Things Pass" from After The Fact (2013)
- Blu - "Can't Stop, Won't Stop" from Good to Be Home (2014)
- Cookbook & Uno Mas - "When You Rock 'n Roll" (2014)
- Diamond D - "It's Magic" from The Diam Piece (2014)
- Apollo Brown - "There's Always Radio" from Grandeur (2015)
- Gangrene - "Just for Decoration" from You Disgust Me (2015)
- DJ Skizz - "Geppetto" from Cruise Control (2016)
- Defari - "Acknowledgement" from Rare Poise (2017)
- Vanderslice - "North American Money" from The Best Album Money Can Buy (2018)
- LMNO, KeyKool & 2Mex - "The Rush" from Blessing In Disguise (2018)
- Domo Genesis - "F#ck A Co-Sign" from Aren't U Glad You're U? (2018)
- Masta Ace - "E.A.T." (2019)
- Brother Ali - "Red" from Secrets & Escapes (2019)
- Statik Selektah - "Soul Custody" from The Balancing Act (2020)
- Alcolirykoz - "El Arte del Loop" from Anarcolirykoz (2024)

== Production credits ==
=== Albums ===
- The Medicine (2006) (with Planet Asia)
- After the Fact (2013) (with LMNO)
- A Whole New Cook (2016) (with CookBook)
- The Darkest Hour (2017) (with Madchild)
- Rare Poise (2017) (with Defari)
- Aren't U Glad You're U? (2018) (with Domo Genesis)
- Secrets & Escapes (2019) (with Brother Ali)
- Rule of Thirds (2021) (with Planet Asia)
- Intros, Outros & Interludes (2022) (with Domo Genesis)
- Los Angeles (2024) (with Blu)
- War Cash (2026) (with Crimeapple)

=== 1996 ===
Various Artists - Old World Chaos (Soundtrack)

- 04. "Here and There" (Evidence)

=== 1997 ===
Defari - N-AS

- 00. "Bottom Line"
- 00. "Change & Switch" (feat. Hannibal Faceman)

Dilated Peoples - N-AS

- 00. "Global Dynamics"
- 00. "Third Degree" (feat. Defari)

Swollen Members - N-AS

- 00. "Shatter Proof"

Visionaries - N-AS

- 00. "Audible Angles"
- 00. "Bottom of the Barrel / Live Life (1 or the Other)"

=== 1998 ===
Jizzm High Definition - Illasophic Vol. 1

- 03. "Based on Principle" (feat. Evidence)
- 07. "Flows Explode"

Of Mexican Descent - Exitos Y Mas Exitos EP

- 01. "I Am Still"

Rasco - Time Waits for No Man

- 04. "Bits & Pieces"
- 05. "Major League" (feat. Defari & Dilated Peoples) (co-produced by Joey Chavez)

Swollen Members - N-AS

- 00. "My Advice"

=== 1999 ===
Defari - Focused Daily

- 03. "Never Lose Touch"
- 04. "Keep It on the Rise"
- 06. "Bionic"
- 10. "These Dreams"
- 12. "Thunder & Lightning" (feat. Tash & Xzibit)
- 13. "405 Friday's" (co-produced by Defari)
- 16. "Gems"
- 17. "People's Choice"

Swollen Members - Balance

- 06. "Counter Parts" (feat. Dilated Peoples)
- 09. "Bottle Rocket" (feat. Divine Styler, Everlast, & Evidence)
- 17. "Consumption" (feat. Aceyalone)

LMNO - N-AS

- A1. "Grin & Bear It"

Planet Asia - N-AS

- A1. "Place of Birth"

Sway and King Tech - This or That

- 07. "Work the Angles (Remix)" [feat. Dilated Peoples, A.G., Defari & Xzibit]

Various Artists - Soundbombing II

- 14. "Soundbombing" (Dilated Peoples & Tash)

Various Artists - Defenders of the Underworld

- 07. "Skills" (Mr. Brady with Evidence)
- 11. "Cooking Up Your Brain" (Defari)

=== 2000 ===
Shaya 'Encore' Bekele - Self-Preservation

- 16. "Filthy"

Souls of Mischief - Trilogy: Conflict, Climax, Resolution

- 01. "Soundscience"

=== 2001 ===
Aceyalone - Accepted Eclectic

- 01. "Rappers Rappers Rappers
- 04. "Hardship"
- 10. "Down Right Dirty"

Casual - He Think He Raw

- 14. "The Shakedown"

Amad Jamal - N-AS

- A1. "LA City"
- C1. "S2Finish"

Pep Love - Ascenion

- 04. "The Fight Club"

Swollen Members - Bad Dreams

- 03. "Full Contact" (feat. Charli 2Na & Evidence)
- 07. "Camoflauge"
- 12. "Total Package" (fest. Planet Asia)

=== 2002 ===
Phil da Agony - N-AS

- A1. "Analyze the Operation" (feat. Dilated)

The Planets - N-AS

- A1. "Open Your Mind"

Tre Hardson - Liberation

- 13. "Stay Around"

Swollen Members - Monsters in the Closet

- 05. "Heavy Thinkers"

=== 2003 ===
Swollen Members - Heavy

- 03. "Remember the Name"
- 04. "Heat"

Noelle - N-AS

- A1. "The Craft" (feat. Dilated Peoples)

Defari - Odds & Evens

- 01 03 04 08 09 16

=== 2004 ===
Planet Asia - The Grand Opening

- 02. "Right or Wrong"

Kanye West - The College Dropout

- 20. "Last Call" {co-produced by Mr. West}

=== 2005 ===
LA Symphony - Disappear Here

- 01. "Timeless"

=== 2006 ===
Tha Alkaholiks - Firewater

- 01. "Handle It"

Swollen Members - Black Magic

- 3 8 13 19

=== 2007 ===
Strong Arm Steady - Deephearted

- 09. "Streetlights" (feat. Talib Kweli)

=== 2008 ===
Heltah Skeltah - D.I.R.T.

- 16. "Hellz Kitchen"

=== 2010 ===
Rakaa - Crown of Thorns

- 03. "Deliah"

=== 2011 ===
Raekwon - Shaolin vs. Wu-Tang

- 15. "The Scroll"

Swollen Members - Monsters II

- 04. "Perfect Storm" (feat. Rakaa)

Apathy - Honkey Kong

- 04. "Check to Check" (co-produced by Khrysis)

Braille - Native Lungs

- 02. "Feel It"

=== 2012 ===
Madchild - Dope Sick

- 07. "Battleaxe" (feat. Bishop Lamont, D-Sisive, & Dilated Peoples)

Sean Price - Mic Tyson

- 11. "BBQ Sauce" (feat. Pharoahe Monch) (co-produced by DJ Babu)
- 13. "By the Way" (feat. Torae)

Fashawn - Champagne & Styrofoam Cups

- 04. "Stardumb"

=== 2013 ===
Roc Marciano - The Pimpire Strikes Back

- 06. "Take Me Over"

=== 2014 ===
Step Brothers - Lord Steppington

- 03. "Byron G" (feat. Domo Genesis & The Whooliganz)

Vince Staples - Shyne Coldchain II

- 01. "Progressive 3" (co-produced by DJ Babu)
- 06. "Trunk Rattle" (co-produced by DJ Babu)

A$ton Matthews - Aston 3:16

- 18. "Mack 11"
- 19. "Plottin" (feat. Vince Staples)

=== 2015 ===
Madchild - Silver Tongue Devil

- 03. "Devils and Angels"

=== 2016 ===
Reks - The Greatest X

- 02. "EgoTrippen" (feat. DJ Heron)

=== 2017 ===
Tha God Fahim - Dump Legend 2

- 03. "Bag Lunches"

Tha God Fahim - Tha Ides of Summer

- 05. "Night King"

Slaine & Termanology - Anti-Hero

- 03. "Life of a Dope Addict" (feat. Catero)

=== 2018 ===
Everlast - Whitye Ford's House of Major Real Pain

- 02. "The Culling"
- 06. "Slow Your Roll" (feat. Aloe Blacc)

Westside Gunn - HWHVI

- 12. "Evidence Joint"

=== 2019 ===
Your Old Droog - It Wasn't Even Close

- 05. "World's About to End"

=== 2020 ===
Crimeapple - Jaguar on Parade

- 08. "Camoflauge"

Willie the Kid - Capital Gains

- 03. "Egregious"

Hus Kingpin - End of a Decade

- 01. "Sabretooth Coats"

Reks- T.H.I.N.G.S. (The Hunger Inside Never Gets Satisfied)

- 04. Barbarians
- 10. "Legacy Driven"
- 17. "This Village"

Sa-Roc - The Sharecropper's Daughter

- 06. "Deliverance"

=== 2022 ===
fly Anakin - Frank

- 03. "Sean Price"

=== 2024 ===
Rakaa - N-AS

- A1. "Conflict & Contradictions"
- B1. "The Singularity"

Copywrite - T,H.E. Last Supper

- 09. "Green Screen"

Bless Picasso - Rillist in the Room

- 07. "SOoul Prescriptions" (feat. T.F.)
