= Slaine discography =

- Studio albums: 5
- EPs: 1
- Mixtapes: 5

The discography of American hip hop artist Slaine, consists of five studio albums, one extended play and five mixtapes. His music has been released on labels such as Leedz Edutainment and Suburban Noize Records.

== Albums ==
=== Studio albums ===
List of studio albums, with selected chart positions
Title	Album details	Peak chart positions		
Title	Album details	US	US R&B	US Rap
A World with No Skies	Released: August 16, 2011; Label: Suburban Noize; Format: CD, digital download	—	33	22
The Boston Project	Released: April 16, 2013; Label: Suburban Noize, CommonWealth; Format: CD, digital download	—	40	—
The King of Everything Else	Released: June 24, 2014; Label: Suburban Noize; Format: CD, digital download	189	26	15
One Day	Released: November 22, 2019; Label: AR Classic; Format: CD, digital download	—	—	—
The Things We Can't Forgive	Released: February 12, 2021; Label: AR Classic; Format: CD, digital download	—	—	—

=== Collaborative albums ===
Title	Album details
Anti-Hero (with Termanology)	Released: October 6, 2017; Label: ST., Brick; Format: CD, digital download

== Extended plays ==
Title	EP details
Slaine Is Dead	Released: September 23, 2016; Label: AR Classic; Format: CD, digital download

== Mixtapes ==
Title	Mixtape details
The White Man Is the Devil, Vol. 1	Released: June 15, 2005; Label: Leedz; Format: CD
The White Man Is the Devil, Vol. 2	Released: October 20, 2006; Label: Leedz; Format: CD
The Devil Never Dies	Released: November 16, 2010; Label: Suburban Noize; Format: CD, digital download
State of Grace (Hosted by Statik Selektah)	Released: August 2, 2011; Label: Suburban Noize; Format: Digital download
House of Slaine	Released: March 17, 2015; Label: Self-released; Format: Digital download

== Guest appearances ==
List of non-single guest appearances, with other performing artists, showing year released and album name
Title	Year	Other artist(s)	Album
"You Don't Love Me"	2002	Matty Trump	Broke and Greedy
"Fahrenheit 911"	2004	Virtuoso	World War II: The Evolution of the Torturer
"Olde English"	2005	7L & Esoteric	Moment of Rarities
"Violent Times"	2006	Ill Bill, Sick Jacken	Ill Bill Is the Future, Part II
"Never Say Never At All"	2007	Sicknature	Honey I'm Home
"Bangmatic"	2007	Stu Bangas, Ill Bill, Reef the Lost Cauze	Stu Bangas, Volume I
"Kids"	2008	Big Left	World War Three
"Little Story"	2008	The Camp	The Campaign
"Lady Liberty"	2008	East Coast Avengers	Prison Planet
"Too Young"	2008	Ill Bill, E-Dot, Darp Malone	The Hour of Reprisal
"Street Veterans, Pt. 3"	2008	Mr. Hyde	Chronicles of the Beastman
"Death and Destiny"	2008	Sabac Red, Playahnice	The Ritual
"Darkness Deepens"	2008	Sabac Red, Ill Bill	
"The Hatred"	2008	Snowgoons, Singapore Kane, Lord Lhus	Black Snow
"Dungeon Masters"	2009	5th Criminal	—
"My Old Gold Chain"	2009	Amadeus the Stampede	House of Broken Mirrors
"Gun Shots"	2009	Freddy Madball, Jaysaun	Catholic Guilt
"Dropkicked"	2009	Rob Kelly	—
"Allison James"	2009	Stoupe the Enemy of Mankind	Decalogue
"Belly Full of Poison"	2009	Rite Hook	Eye Assume Damage
"Dumb"	2009	Swollen Members, Everlast, Tre Nyce	Armed to the Teeth
"Coke"	2009	U-God, Raekwon, Y-Not da Best	Dopium
"Get Outta Here"	2009	Matty Trump, Frankie Wainwright, Man Terror	The Trump Card
"Careful What You Ask for"	2009	Matty Trump, Diego, No Chance, Sticks	The Trump Card
"Hate My Gutz"	2010	Adlib, Reef the Lost Cauze, DJ Kwestion	—
"Psycho"	2010	Chilla Jones	The Juggernaut
"Gramz of Raw"	2010	Click Animosity	Feeders of the Flamez
"Too Much"	2010	Falside, Amadeus the Stampede	Dollars Make Change
"Skull & Guns"	2010	Ill Bill, DJ Muggs, Everlast	Kill Devil Hills
"No Turning Back"	2010	Q-Unique, Jise	Between Heaven and Hell
"Manslaughter"	2010	Al-J, Jaysaun	Unforgivable Blakness
"Suicide Slang"	2010	Reef the Lost Cauze, King Magnetic	Fight Music
"Settin' It Off"	2010	Reks, Jaysaun, JFK, Steven King	In Between the Lines, v.2
"Put 'Em Up"	2010	Snowgoons, N.B.S.	Kraftwerk
"Take Me Home"	2011	Chris Webby	There Goes the Neighborhood
"Twisted"	2011	Amadeus the Stampede	The Devil Made Me Do It
"Man Made Ways"	2011	DC the Midi Alien, Vinnie Paz, Sabac Red, Trademarc	Avengers Airwaves
"Metal In Your Mouth"	2011	Ill Bill, Vinnie Paz	Heavy Metal Kings
"Holy Ghost"	2011	Apathy	Honkey Kong
"Nightmares"	2011	Moroney	Fahkin' Moroney Khedd
"Cocaine Cowboys" (Remix)	2011	PainKillah Crew	Euthanasia
"You Don't Know Me"	2011	Billions	A Secret Worth Billions
"Tour"	2012	Cam Meekins	Blazed and Confused 2
"Boston Lights" (Remix)	2012	Moufy, Smoke Bulga, Termanology, Edo-G	—
"So Cold"	2012	Staxx	Writin' My Mind
"Actual Facts"	2012	Blak Madeen	Divine Power Culture
"Top of the World"	2012	Wisdom In Chains	The Missing Links
"Grenade Launcher"	2012	Madchild, Prevail	Dope Sick
"Death to You"	2013	Swollen Members, Ill Bill, Vinnie Paz	Beautiful Death Machine
"Chainsaw"	2013	Madchild	Lawn Mower Man
"Focused"	2015	Termanology, Cryus DeShield	Term Brady
"Triple Threat"	2015	Madchild, Demrick	Silver Tongue Devil
"Don't Stop"	2015	Madchild	Silver Tongue Devil
"Tomorrow Is Gone"	2017	Apathy, O.C., Kappa Gamma	Perestroika
"Satan Stone"	2017	The Devil's Twins	American Noir Vol. 1
"Angels Calling"	2018	Street Dogs	Stand For Something Or Die For Nothing
"One Step Closer"	2024	Switch, Stoupe the Enemy of Mankind	Blue

== Music videos ==
As lead performer
Year	Album title	Title	Director	Featured artists
2006	A Boston State of Mind	Rich Man, Poor Man	Matt Workman	
2010	The Write Off Vol. 1	King Villain	Timmy Slices	
2010	A World with No Skies 1.0	99 Bottles	Nick Cangello	
2011	The Devil Never Dies	The Religion	n/c	
2011	A World with No Skies 2.0	Borrowed Time	Los Silva	Checkmark, Lu Balz
2011	A World with No Skies 2.0	Zombie	Blake Farber	Son of Skam
2012	A World with No Skies 2.0	Trail of Blood	Los Silva	
2013	The Boston Project	Evolution of the Kid	Big Shot Music Inc	
2013	The Boston Project	Nothin' But Business	n/c	BR, V Knuckles
2014	The King of Everything Else	Getting High	Jon Knauz	Demrick
2014	The King of Everything Else	Bobby Be Real	n/c	Tech N9ne, Madchild
2014	The King of Everything Else	Destroy Everything	Ben Cassiani	Rite Hook
2016	Slaine is Dead	Pusher	Christian Hardy	
2016	Slaine is Dead	Slaine is Dead	Xander Z. Hayes	
2018	/	Source of Power	Ben Proulox / Project 2	
2019	One Day	Redemption	Sandofilms	
2019	One Day	The Feeling I Get	Anthony La Rose	
2019	One Day	Trick The Trap	Anthony La Rose	Statik Selektah, Rasheed Chappell
2020	One Day	Do What You Love	SandoFilms	Cyrus Deshield
2020	One Day	Broken Toys	Mathew Watkins	Apathy (rapper), Locksmith (rapper)
2021	The Things We Can't Forgive	Chasing Ghosts	ILL-Manered Films	Rite Hook
2021	The Things We Can't Forgive	Where The War Ends	Slaine	Ill Bill
2021	The Things We Can't Forgive	Legend Of The Fall	The Arcitype	
2022	One Day (Director's Cut)	To Whom It May Concern	The Arcitype	

As featured performer
Year	Artist	Title	Director	Other featured artists
2008	Special Teamz	One Call	Jerome D	
2008	La Coka Nostra	That's Coke	Danny Boy	
2008	DJ Revolution	Big Top	Peter Dudgeon	Special Teamz
2009	La Coka Nostra	I'm An American	n/c	B-Real
2009	La Coka Nostra	Cousin of Death	Frank Sacramento	
2010	Freddy Madball	Shotguns	n/c	Jaysaun
2011	DJ Deadeye	Livin' Lost	Doug York	Esoteric, Krumb Snatcha, Ea$y Money, DC The Midi Alien
2011	Powda	The Program	Method to Madness Productions	Termanology
	Sabac Red	How We Think	John Coyne	DJ JS1, Sick Jacken
2012	Moufy	Boston Lights Remix	n/c	Smoke Bulga, Ed O.G., Termanology
2012	La Coka Nostra	Creed of the Greedier	J.F. Martin	
2012	So Sick Social Club	Funeral	J.F. Martin	Ironic
2012	La Coka Nostra	Mind Your Business	J.F. Martin / Tom Vujcic	
2012	La Coka Nostra	Letter to Ouisch	Danny Boy	
2012	Traitorz	Death Comes in 3's	J.Nuno	
2012	Statik Selektah & JFK	Let's Go Celtics	Myster DL	Jaysaun
2013	Rob Kelly	Dropkicked	Jonathan Lambert	
2013	Reel Wolf	The Underworld	Tom Vujcic	Bizarre, Reef the Lost Cauze, Ill Bill, Celph Titled, King Gordy, Sid Wilson, PMD, Sean Strange, Apathy, Swifty Mcvay, Vinnie Paz, Tech N9ne
2015	Supreme Villain	The Enemy	Tom Vujcic	Rite Hook
2015	Apollo Brown & Ras Kass	Drink Irish	Scott O'Malley	Sick Jacken
2015	Termanology	Depths of Hell	CS Films	Artisin
2015	MoSS	Jealousy & Envy	Gorilla Fix	Termanology
2015	La Coka Nostra	Dark Day Road	Bernard Rose	
2016	La Coka Nostra	Waging War	Tom Vujcic	Rite Hook
2016	Reel Wolf	The Underworld 2	Tom Vujcic	Havoc, Kid Fade, Johnny Richter, Kool G Rap, Chino XL, Necro, Ruste Juxx, Kuniva, Sabac Red, Ill Bill, Sean Price
2016	Fieldhouse	Cutthroat	Myster DL	
2017	G-Life	Game Changed	Evan Moore	
2017	Slaine vs Termanology	Land of the Lost	Myster DL	
2017	Slaine vs Termanology	Anti-Hero	John Columbo	Bun B, Everlast
2017	Slaine vs Termanology	Life of a Drug Addict	John Columbo	
2019	Switch	Hold of my soul	Forbez	n/c
2020	Nohokai	Golden Goose	n/c	Rite Hook
