= Unlearning Vol. 1 =

Studio album by Evidence
- Released: June 25, 2021
- Studios: ALC Laboratories (Los Angeles, CA); Enzo's Garage Studios; Cores' Dreamroom; Lucky's Lab
- Genre: Hip-hop
- Length: 42:08
- Label: Rhymesayers
- Producers: Alchemist; Animoss; Daringer; Evidence; Khrysis; Mr. Green; Nottz; Sebb Bash; QThree a.k.a. EarDrum; V Don

Evidence chronology
Weather or Not (2018)	Unlearning Vol. 1 (2021)	Unlearning Vol. 2 (2025)

Professional ratings
Review scores
Source	Rating
HipHopDX	3.9/5
RapReviews	7.5/10
Spectrum Culture	2.5/5 stars

Unlearning Vol. 1 is the fourth solo studio album by American rapper and record producer Evidence. It was released on June 25, 2021, through Rhymesayers Entertainment. Recording sessions took place at ALC Laboratories in Los Angeles, Enzo's Garage Studios, Cores' Dreamroom, and Lucky's Lab. Production was handled by Evidence himself, as well as Sebb Bash, QThree a.k.a. EarDrum, Animoss, Daringer, Khrysis, Mr. Green, Nottz, V Don, and the Alchemist, who also served as one of the executive producers together with Slug and Brent Sayers. It features guest appearances from Boldy James, Conway the Machine, Fly Anakin, Murkage Dave and Navy Blue. The album debuted at number 77 on the Top Album Sales and number 46 on the Current Album Sales in the United States, and at number 12 on the Top 100 Album-Charts and number-one on the Top 20 HipHop-Charts in Germany.

== Background ==
On April 22, 2021, Evidence announced that his upcoming album Unlearning Vol. 1 is set for the release on the 25th of June 2021 via Rhymesayers Entertainment, sharing cover art, track-list and the Alchemist-produced song "Better You" with accompanying music video. The album's title came from Evidence's GrayMatter-produced single "Unlearning", which was released in March 2020. The album marks Evidence's fifth project for the label, preceded by 2011 Cats & Dogs, 2014 Lord Steppington with the Alchemist (as Step Brothers) and Directors of Photography as part of Dilated Peoples, and 2018 Weather or Not. Music videos were also released for the songs "All of That Said", "Pardon Me" and "Lost In Time (Park Jams)", directed by Stephen Vanasco.

== Track listing ==
No.	Title	Producer(s)	Length
1.	"Better You"	The Alchemist	3:00
2.	"Start the Day With a Beat"	Evidence	1:55
3.	"Sharks Smell Blood"	Sebb Bash	3:07
4.	"Pardon Me"	Animoss	3:17
5.	"All of That Said" (featuring Boldy James)	Evidence	3:09
6.	"Won't Give Up the Danger" (featuring Murkage Dave)	Mr. Green	2:38
7.	"Moving on Up" (featuring Conway the Machine)	Daringer	5:04
8.	"Talking to the Audience"	Khrysis	1:24
9.	"All Money 1983"	QThree a.k.a. EarDrum	3:17
10.	"Pray With an A" (featuring Navy Blue)	QThree a.k.a. EarDrum	2:40
11.	"Lost in Time (Park Jams)"	Nottz	3:13
12.	"Delay the Issue" (featuring Fly Anakin)	Evidence	3:14
13.	"Taylor Made Suit"	V Don	2:59
14.	"Where We Going From Here..."	Sebb Bash	3:11
Total length:			42:08

== Personnel ==
- Michael "Evidence" Peretta – vocals, producer (tracks: 2, 5, 12)
- James Clay "Boldy James" Jones III – vocals (track 5)
- David "Murkage Dave" Lewis – vocals (track 6)
- Demond "Conway the Machine" Price – vocals (track 7)
- Sage "Navy Blue" Elsesser – vocals (track 10)
- Frank L. "Fly Anakin" Walton Jr. – vocals (track 12)
- Luke James – additional vocals (track 12)
- Zach "DJ Skizz" Raemer – scratches (track 3)
- Chris "DJ Babu" Oroc – scratches (tracks: 7, 11)
- Alan "The Alchemist" Maman – producer (track 1), executive producer
- Sébastien "Sebb Bash" Vuignier – producer (tracks: 3, 14)
- Animoss – producer (track 4)
- Aaron "Mr. Green" Green – producer (track 6)
- Thomas "DJ Daringer" Paladino – producer (track 7)
- Christopher "Khrysis" Tyson – producer (track 8)
- QThree a.k.a. EarDrum – producer (tracks: 9, 10)
- Dominick "Nottz" Lamb – producer (track 11)
- Tivon "V Don" Key – producer (track 13)
- Eddie Sancho – mixing (tracks: 1, 2, 5–14)
- Philippe Weiss – mixing (tracks: 3, 4)
- Bernie Grundman – mastering
- Sean "Slug" Daley – executive producer
- Brent Sayers – executive producer
- Brent Rollins – creative director, design
- Stephen Vanasco – photography
- Alex Everson – coordinator
- Jordon Daley – coordinator
- Kevin Beacham – coordinator
- Ali Newman – A&R
- Enzo Perretta – A&R
- Kevin Zinger – management

== Charts ==
Chart (2021)	Peak position
German Albums (Offizielle Top 100)	12
US Top Album Sales (Billboard)	77
US Current Album Sales (Billboard)	46
