= Rapper's Best Friend 3 =

Compilation album by the Alchemist
- Released: September 30, 2014
- Genre: Hip-hop
- Length: 46:58
- Label: ALC Records
- Producer: The Alchemist

The Alchemist chronology
Lord Steppington (2014)	Rapper's Best Friend 3 (2014)

Rapper's Best Friend 3 is the seventh instrumental compilation album by American hip-hop producer and recording artist the Alchemist. It is third installment in the Alchemist's instrumental series Rapper's Best Friend. The other two albums in the series, Rapper's Best Friend and Rapper's Best Friend 2, were released in 2007 and 2012, respectively.

The compilation contains selected beats produced by the Alchemist that were used as instrumentals for rap songs of artists like Evidence, Prodigy, Durag Dynasty, Schoolboy Q and more in the past few years. All songs were produced by the Alchemist.

== Background ==
On July 17, 2014, the Alchemist teased via Twitter that "Rapper's Best Friend Part Three is coming". No more details were reviled yet. Later, on September 16, Alchemist posted a video on his YouTube Channel, and posted it on his Twitter. It was a psychedelic visual promo for RBF3, directed by the acclaimed music video director Jason Goldwatch, with one of the tracks that will be on the album, "Shut The F*ck Up" (which was the beat for the song "STFU Pt. 2" by rapper Sean Price). In the end of the video there was a release date announcement for the instrumental album (September 30, 2014), and the reveal of the cover artwork and the official track list. The cover artwork was created by Dom "Dom Dirtee" Rinaldi. Since the release of the video, though, the album was already available for Pre-Order on the iTunes Store.

The compilation was released on the stated date, with promotion from the Alchemist on Twitter with tweets like: "Today is the day that you're gonna pay 10$ because you like my beats [link to the album's iTunes page]"

== Track listing ==
No.	Title	Original artist	Length
1.	"The Red Carpet"	Evidence; Raekwon; Ras Kass	4:48
2.	"Shut the Fuck Up"	Sean Price	2:55
3.	"Tender Greens"	Durag Dynasty	2:43
4.	"Get It Forever"	Mobb Deep; Nas	4:01
5.	"Break the Bank"	Schoolboy Q	6:04
6.	"Black Cocaine"	Mobb Deep	4:07
7.	"The Myth"	Styles P	5:54
8.	"Trap Door"	Joey Badass	2:25
9.	"I.M.D.K.V"	Prodigy	2:40
10.	"Give Em Hell"	Prodigy	2:58
11.	"All on Me"	Slaughterhouse	2:09
12.	"How Does It Feel"	ChrisCo	2:45
13.	"1010 Wins"	Domo Genesis; Action Bronson; Meyhem Lauren; Roc Marciano; Despot	3:29
Total length:			46:58
