= The Cutting Room Floor 3 =

Mixtape by the Alchemist
- Released: December 25, 2013
- Recorded: 2008–13
- Genre: Hip-hop
- Length: 50:03
- Label: ALC Records
- Producer: The Alchemist

The Alchemist chronology
My 1st Chemistry Set (2013)	The Cutting Room Floor 3 (2013)	Lord Steppington (2014)

The Cutting Room Floor 3 is the sixth mixtape by American hip-hop producer and recording artist the Alchemist. It was released on December 25, 2013, through his own record label, ALC Records. It serves as the third instalment of The Cutting Room Floor mixtape series, following up the original 2003 mixtape and its 2008 sequel.

== Track listing ==
No.	Title	Length
1.	"Obama Ear Rings"	1:02
2.	"Too Late" (featuring Nas)	1:45
3.	"The Hawaii Chair"	0:32
4.	"Jolly Ranchers" (featuring Raekwon)	2:47
5.	"Rock Creek Spark" (featuring Raekwon)	1:15
6.	"Triple Ka-Chingo"	0:30
7.	"My Money Partying" (featuring Havoc)	0:53
8.	"How It Goes" (featuring Mobb Deep and Chinky)	2:42
9.	"Problems" (featuring Kool G Rap)	2:34
10.	"We Keep The Title"	0:36
11.	"Perfectionist" (featuring Rick Ross and Meek Mill)	2:48
12.	"Doo Wop" (featuring Blu, Killer Ben, and Planet Asia)	2:20
13.	"The Flavor Wave"	1:32
14.	"Iron Biscuits" (featuring Capone-N-Noreaga)	2:08
15.	"True Blue" (featuring Large Professor)	0:57
16.	"AIDS Diet"	0:30
17.	"Mechanic" (featuring 50 Cent)	3:41
18.	"Man vs. Beast"	1:23
19.	"Way Out" (featuring Oh No and Evidence)	3:02
20.	"Stay Fresh"	0:54

Bonus Tracks
No.	Title	Length
1.	"Great Looking Hair"	0:45
2.	"Pool Hall Hustler" (featuring Action Bronson and Roc Marciano)	2:27
3.	"Songs In F Major" (featuring Fashawn)	4:00
4.	"Mister Microphone"	0:25
5.	"CBS" (featuring CJ Fly, Dessy Hinds, and Nyck Caution)	3:00
6.	"The Myth" (featuring Styles P)	5:35

Notes

- "Too Late" was originally released as a Bravehearts song titled "Never Too Late", which Nas' verse was initially featured on. This version appeared on the DJ Clue? mixtape Hev E. Components, Part 1 in 2001.
- "Jolly Ranchers" was originally released in April 2010, and later appeared as part of Raekwon's Cocainism, Vol. 2 mixtape under the title "Big Beat".
- "Perfectionist" was originally released in early 2011, with its music video releasing shortly after the release of the Maybach Music Group compilation Self Made, Vol. 1.
- "Mechanic" was originally released on the G-Unit mixtape Return of the Body Snatchers in 2008.
- "Doo Wop" was originally released on the Blu mixtape jesus in 2011, under the title "doowhop".
- "The Myth" was originally released on the Styles P mixtape The Diamond Life Project in 2012.
