= Lawnmower Man =

Lawnmower Man may refer to:

- "The Lawnmower Man", a 1975 short story by Stephen King
- The Lawnmower Man (film), a 1992 film directed by Brett Leonard
- The Lawnmower Man (video game), a 1993 video game produced by Atod and based on the film
- Lawn Mower Man, the second studio album by Canadian rapper Madchild
