= The Whooliganz =

American hip hop group

- Origin: Beverly Hills, California, U.S.
- Genres: Hip hop; West Coast hip hop
- Years active: 1991–1994; 2014 (reunion)
- Labels: Tommy Boy/Warner Bros.; Soul Assassins Records
- Past members: Mad Skillz; Mudfoot

The Whooliganz were an American 1990s hip hop music duo consisting of Scott Caan and Alan Maman (the latter of whom is known now as hip hop producer The Alchemist). The duo went by the names Mad Skillz and Mudfoot, respectively.

Caan and Maman met as teenagers in the wealthy neighborhood of Beverly Hills, California. The duo began performing throughout the Los Angeles area and gained recognition. Maman's childhood friend Evidence introduced the group to Quincy Jones III and they began work on a demo. They eventually caught the attention of B-Real of Cypress Hill, who invited the teens to join the collective Soul Assassins, which also consisted of Cypress Hill, House of Pain and Funkdoobiest. The Whooliganz toured the country with the Soul Assassins and their connection helped them land a record deal with Tommy Boy Records.

The Whooliganz recorded their debut album, Make Way for the W. The album's first single was "Put Your Handz Up", which was produced by DJ Lethal and released in 1993, but the single and music video did not receive much airplay. A second single, "Don't Mean Nothin'," was planned but then Tommy Boy decided to drop the group and not release the album. Another song, "Whooliganz," was released as a single in 1995 in the UK on Positiva/EMI Records, but the duo had already gone its separate ways. Caan followed his father, James Caan, into a successful acting career. Maman turned to making beats and found success as hip hop producer the Alchemist.

In 2014, Caan and Maman reunited to collaborate on the song "Byron G." from Step Brothers' album Lord Steppington. According to Step Brothers, another collaboration was recorded featuring Caan and Action Bronson but it was not released.

== Other sources ==
- Winning, Brolin (December 1, 2004). "The Alchemist—Popular Science". Remix Magazine. Archived from the original on April 15, 2009.
- Brown, Marisa. "The Alchemist: Biography". AllMusic.
