= Murkage Cartel =

The Murkage Cartel was an arts organisation based in Manchester, England, founded by musician Murkage Dave. The Cartel was made up of the band Murkage, and a culturally diverse assortment of DJs, musicians, photographers, film makers, designers and bloggers. They were best known for the work of the band, the weekly club night - 'The Murkage Club'- their DJ performances and the online presence of the collective as a whole. They made a distinctive and sometimes controversial contribution to the region's underground music scene.

== Members ==
- Murkage Dave - founder/artist
- Gaika - creative/vocalist
- Mr Kenzo - DJ/artwork designer
- Phaze One - DJ/producer
- Klepto - DJ/promoter
- Smith - DJ/producer
- Bad Osiris fka. The Badderman - DJ
- Dizzietron - DJ/blogger
- Dialog - DJ
- Ping pong - vocalist/songwriter/stylist
- Ranen - vocalist/songwriter/promoter
- Martisau - DJ/promoter
- Darka - DJ/radio presenter/blogger
- Cerys Rebecca - film maker
- Madam X - DJ/radio presenter
- Can You Felix - DJ
- Robb Roxx - promoter/blogger
- Matt Comer - photographer
- Amat Amas Amo - drummer/producer/filmmaker/photographer/vegan activist
- Alicia - DJ
- DJFholme - DJ

=== Murkage Cartel DJs ===
The Murkage Cartel were among the most prominent and in demand underground DJs in Manchester with many of them holding residences on local and national radio stations as well as regional events. They played together on rotation at The Murkage Club every week. Both independently and as a group they developed a strong following especially amongst the large student population in northwest of the United Kingdom.

The Murkage Cartel's Vol. 1 mixtape was chosen as being the mixtape of the month, in Mixmag magazine (September 2009). They also later featured in Mixmag for the Boxfresh advertisement campaign. The Murkage Cartel's Vol. 2 mixtape was also met with critical acclaim. The Murkage Cartel were known for having presence on Twitter, Facebook, and they also contributed to the MURKAGE website blog.

== Murkage TV ==
Documenting the success of the Murkage club night, Murkage TV was created. The episodes feature interviews from the Cartel and from other artists that have performed with the Cartel, such as David Rodigan, AC Slater, Example, Seb Chew, Jack Beats and Mark Ronson.

== Tonga ==
After the Murkage Club came to an end in 2015 after 8 years in Manchester, the founder of Murkage, Murkage Dave collaborated with Mike Skinner on a new London event. The club night gained extremely quick recognition within London with guests such as Giggs, Kano, Big Narstie and Fekky all making surprise appearances at their events. Within their first year, they announced that they would be working on a 'Tonga Balloon Gang' EP with Jammer and Big Narstie featuring, which was due for release on November 14, which coincided with their first birthday party.

Outside of the monthly clubnight, Tonga also quickly gained recognition across Europe as being one of the most exciting DJ acts, incorporating Murkage Cartel members Klepto and Smith as well as Oscar Worldpeace, who was managed by Mike Skinner. In 2015 Tonga played Glastonbury and Bestival in the summer and also toured the UK and Europe throughout 2015. The group is currently on hiatus.
