= Weather or Not =

Studio album by Evidence
- Released: January 26, 2018
- Recorded: 2016–17
- Genres: Hip hop; alternative hip hop
- Length: 55:22
- Label: Rhymesayers Entertainment
- Producers: Alchemist; Budgie; DJ Babu; DJ Premier; Evidence; Nottz; Samiyam; Twiz the Beat Pro

Evidence chronology
Lord Steppington (2014)	Weather or Not (2018)	Unlearning Vol. 1 (2021)

Professional ratings
Review scores
Source	Rating
Exclaim!	5/10
HipHopDX	4.4/5
laut.de	4/5 stars
Pitchfork	7/10
RapReviews	8/10

Weather or Not is the third solo studio album by American rapper and producer Evidence. It was released on January 26, 2018, via Rhymesayers Entertainment. Production was handled by the Alchemist, Budgie, DJ Babu, DJ Premier, Nottz, Samiyam, Twiz the Beat Pro, and Evidence himself. It features guest appearances from Catero, Defari, Jonwayne, Khrysis, Krondon, Mach-Hommy, Rakaa Iriscience, Rapsody, Slug, Styles P and the Alchemist.

This album is a follow-up to his 2011 album, Cats & Dogs, and is the final entry in his "Weatherman" series. Prior to the release, three singles and videos were released: "Throw It All Away", "Jim Dean" and "10,000 Hours". Photography for the album cover and a 12-page booklet was done by photographer Steven Vanasco. Evidence came to know him through his Instagram page and they became friends. Vanasco also directed the videos for "Throw It All Away" and "10,000 Hours". The video for "Jim Dean" was directed by Evidence's long time friend and collaborator Jason Goldwatch.

Upon its release, the album debuted at number 187 on the Billboard 200, number 9 on the Independent Albums and number 8 on the Tastemaker Albums charts in the United States. It also made it to number 48 on the Swiss Hitparade.

== Track listing ==
No.	Title	Producer(s)	Length
1.	"The Factory"	Twiz the Beat Pro	2:58
2.	"Throw It All Away"	The Alchemist	2:57
3.	"Powder Cocaine" (featuring Slug and Catero)	The Alchemist	2:56
4.	"Jim Dean"	Nottz	4:02
5.	"Weather or Not"	DJ Babu	4:04
6.	"Moving Too Fast" (featuring Catero)	Evidence	1:32
7.	"Runners" (featuring Defari)	Evidence	3:26
8.	"Bad Publicity" (featuring Krondon)	Nottz	4:18
9.	"Rain Drops"	Twiz the Beat Pro	3:15
10.	"Sell Me This Pen" (featuring The Alchemist and Mach-Hommy)	The Alchemist	3:54
11.	"Love Is a Funny Thing" (featuring Styles P, Rapsody and Khrysis)	The Alchemist	4:45
12.	"10,000 Hours"	DJ Premier	2:51
13.	"What I Need"	Evidence	3:54
14.	"To Make a Long Story Longer" (featuring Jonwayne)	Samiyam	4:12
15.	"Wonderful World" (featuring Rakaa Iriscience)	Budgie	3:35
16.	"By My Side Too"	Budgie	2:43
Total length:			55:22

Digital bonus track
No.	Title	Producer(s)	Length
17.	"Old Habits"	Twiz the Beat Pro	2:27

== Personnel ==
- Michael "Evidence" Peretta – vocals, producer (tracks: 6, 7, 13), recording (tracks: 2, 3, 6–8, 10, 11, 14–16), executive producer
- Catero Colbert – vocals (tracks: 3, 6)
- Sean "Slug" Daley – vocals (track 3), executive producer
- Duane A. "Defari" Johnson Jr. – vocals (track 7), recording (tracks: 7, 13)
- Marvin "Krondon" Jones – vocals (track 8)
- Alan "The Alchemist" Maman – vocals (track 10), producer (tracks: 2, 3, 10, 11), recording (tracks: 3, 10, 11), executive producer
- Mach-Hommy – vocals (track 10)
- David "Styles P" Styles – vocals (track 11)
- Marlanna "Rapsody" Evans – vocals (track 11)
- Christopher "Khrysis" Tyson – vocals (track 11)
- Jonathan "Jonwayne" Wayne – vocals (track 14)
- Rakaa "Iriscience" Taylor – vocals (track 15)
- Chris "DJ Babu" Oroc – scratches (tracks: 4, 5, 14, 15), producer (track 5)
- Kurt "DJ Revolution" Hoffman – scratches (track 8)
- Duante St. Louis – bass (track 13)
- Timothy "Twiz The Beat Pro" McRae – producer (tracks: 1, 9, 17), recording (tracks: 1, 4, 8, 9, 12)
- Dominick "Nottz" Lamb – producer (tracks: 4, 8)
- Christopher "DJ Premier" Martin – producer & mixing (track 12)
- Sam "Samiyam" Baker – producer & recording (track 14)
- Benjamin "Budgie" Scholefield – producer (tracks: 15, 16)
- Frederico Lopez – recording (tracks: 3, 8, 9, 13)
- Dillan Parker – recording (track 3)
- James "LMNO" Kelly – recording (track 5)
- Fihim "Tha God Fahim" Martin – recording (track 10)
- Eddie Sancho – mixing (tracks: 1–11, 13–16)
- Joe LaPorta – mastering
- Brent Sayers – executive producer
- Kevin Zinger – executive producer, management
- Ryan Clark – art direction, design
- Stephen Vanasco – photography

== Charts ==
Chart (2018)	Peak position
Swiss Albums (Schweizer Hitparade)	48
UK R&B Albums (Official Charts)	23
UK Independent Albums (Official Charts)	45
US Billboard 200	187
US Independent Albums (Billboard)	9
US Indie Store Album Sales (Billboard)	8
