= Go Tell Fire to the Mountain =

Studio album by WU LYF
- Released: 13 June 2011
- Recorded: Winter 2010
- Studio: St Peter's Church in Ancoats, Manchester, England
- Genre: Indie rock, post-rock, art rock
- Length: 47:09
- Label: LYF Recordings
- Producer: WU LYF; Pauli Beats (Note: "Collaborating in production" (co-producer).)

WU LYF chronology
Go Tell Fire to the Mountain (2011)	A Wave That Will Never Break (2026)

Singles from Go Tell Fire to the Mountain
- 1. "Concrete Gold" / "Heavy Pop" Released: 31 May 2010; 2. "Dirt" Released: June 2011 (promo only); 3. "We Bros" Released: 20 September 2011

Go Tell Fire to the Mountain is the debut album by English band WU LYF, released on 13 June 2011. The album was released to high anticipation and the backing of NME, Stereogum, and Pitchfork.

== Recording ==
The band had the concept for Go Tell Fire to the Mountain long before the recording process took place. Roberts states that it was written "in a narrative sense and [was approached] as a complete work rather than a bunch of songs thrown together." When searching for a place to record, the group was dissatisfied with the sound they were getting from traditional studios, leading them to settle on Saint Peter's, an old abandoned church in Ancoats, Greater Manchester. The amount of open airspace in the church allowed for a healthy dose of reverb, which is a critical part of the album's larger than life sound. Despite the media's insistence of the location's relevance to the religious theme of the band, Roberts denies it. Although the church altered the "vibe of the songs", the band asserts that Saint Peter's church sonically fit the album's needs.

== Singles ==
"Heavy Pop" and "Concrete Gold" were released as a double A-side single prior to the album on 31 May 2010. "Dirt" was released as a radio-only promo CD in support of the album's release in June 2011. "We Bros" was released as a single from the album on 20 September 2011.

== Critical reception ==
Professional ratings
Aggregate scores
Source	Rating
AnyDecentMusic?	7.5/10
Metacritic	77/100
Review scores
Source	Rating
AllMusic	3.5/5 stars
The A.V. Club	C+
The Guardian	4/5 stars
The Irish Times	3/5 stars
Mojo	3/5 stars
NME	8/10
Pitchfork	8.4/10
Q	4/5 stars
Spin	8/10
Uncut	3/5 stars

Go Tell Fire to the Mountain was met with "generally favorable" reviews from critics. At Metacritic, which assigns a weighted average rating out of 100 to reviews from mainstream publications, this release received an average score of 77 based on 20 reviews.

=== Accolades ===
Publications' year-end list appearances for Go Tell Fire to the Mountain
Critic/Publication	List	Rank	Ref
Beats Per Minute	Beats Per Minute's Top 50 Albums of 2011	6	
Complex	Complex's Top 25 Albums of 2011	10	
The Fly	The Fly's Top 50 Albums of 2011	28	
NME	NME's Top 50 Albums of 2011	10	

== Track listing ==
All songs written and composed by WU LYF.

No.	Title	Length
1.	"L Y F"	4:31
2.	"Cave Song"	3:49
3.	"Such a Sad Puppy Dog"	5:32
4.	"Summas Bliss"	4:01
5.	"We Bros"	6:27
6.	"Spitting Blood"	3:48
7.	"Dirt"	3:19
8.	"Concrete Gold"	5:35
9.	"14 Crowns for Me & Your Friends"	4:42
10.	"Heavy Pop"	5:35

== Charts ==
Chart performance for Go Tell Fire to the Mountain
Chart (2011)	Peak position
Belgian Albums (Ultratop Wallonia)	73
French Albums (SNEP)	85
UK Albums (OCC)	98
US Heatseekers Albums (Billboard)	32
