= Switched On (EP) =

EP by Madchild
- Released: September 30, 2014
- Recorded: 2014
- Studio: The Chamber Studios (Nanaimo, British Columbia)
- Genre: Hip hop
- Length: 1:04:39
- Label: Battle Axe Records
- Producer: Ivory Daniel (exec.); Kevin Zinger (exec.); Madchild (exec.); C-Lance; Aspect; Rob The Viking; Chin Injeti; Community Music Group

Madchild chronology
Lawn Mower Man (2013)	Switched On (2014)	Silver Tongue Devil (2015)

Professional ratings
Review scores
Source	Rating
Exclaim!	6/10
HipHopDX	3/5
RapReviews	6.5/10

Switched On is the sixth solo EP by Canadian rapper Madchild. It was released on September 30, 2014, via Battle Axe Records. Recording sessions took place at the Chamber Studios in Nanaimo, British Columbia. Production was handled by C-Lance, Aspect, Rob The Viking, Chin Injeti and Community Music Group. It features guest appearance from Sophia Danai. The album peaked at number eight on the Canadian Albums Chart.

== Track listing ==
All lyrics are written by Shane Bunting.

No.	Title	Producer(s)	Length
1.	"White Knuckles"	Rob the Viking	3:44
2.	"Amadeus"	C-Lance	2:06
3.	"Switched On"	Rob the Viking	2:28
4.	"Iran"	C-Lance	3:47
5.	"Never Die"	Aspect	2:12
6.	"Hellbound"	C-Lance	3:49
7.	"Tom Cruise"	Aspect	4:08
8.	"On One" (featuring Sophia Danai)	Chin Injeti	3:11
9.	"Blitzkrieg"	Rob the Viking	2:13
10.	"Act My Age"	C-Lance	3:50

Deluxe Edition
No.	Title	Producer(s)	Length
11.	"Black Belt"	Aspect	4:26
12.	"Drugs In My Pocket"	Aspect	4:23
13.	"Gremlin"	Aspect	3:48
14.	"Tiger Blood"	Aspect	4:23
15.	"Broken Mirror"	Rob the Viking	3:14
16.	"Out of My Head"	Aspect	4:35
17.	"Under a Spell"	Community Music Group	3:06
18.	"Fuck Madchild" (OG Mix)	Aspect	3:33
19.	"Good Crazy"	Aspect	2:49
Total length:			1:04:39

== Personnel ==
- Shane "Madchild" Bunting – main artist, executive producer
- Sophia Danai – featured artist (track 8)
- Robin "Rob the Viking" Hooper – producer (tracks: 1, 3, 9, 15), arranger, recording, mixing (tracks: 1–9)
- Craig "C-Lance" Lanciani – producer (tracks: 2, 4, 6, 10)
- Aspect – producer (tracks: 5, 7, 11–14, 16, 18, 19)
- Pranam "Chin" Injeti – producer (track 8)
- Jimi Dali – producer (track 17)
- Rob Whalen – producer (track 17)
- Mike Kumagai – mixing (tracks: 10–13, 15–18)
- Roger Swan – mixing (track 14)
- Tom Baker – mastering
- Ivory Daniel – executive producer, management
- Kevin Zinger – executive producer, management
- Ryan Lindow – photography
- Alex Rauch – design
- Rakaa Taylor – booking
- Zach Johnson – booking

== Charts ==
Chart performance for Switched On
Chart (2014)	Peak position
Canadian Albums (Billboard)	8
US Top R&B/Hip-Hop Albums (Billboard)	32
US Top Rap Albums (Billboard)	18
US Heatseekers Albums (Billboard)	16
