= Murkage Dave =

British singer and songwriter

Murkage Dave (born David Lewis) is a singer and songwriter from Leytonstone, East London.

== Career ==
=== Early years, club nights, 'Car Bomb' ===
Dave started making music while he was at university in Manchester, including 'Hands On Her' which was remixed by Sunship and appeared on a DJ EZ compilation, and ran the weekly Monday Murkage club night. He continued to promote parties and DJ, forming the Murkage Cartel a collective of DJs, musicians, photographers, film makers, designers and bloggers.

When Dave returned to London in 2016, he formed the duo HALFBROTHER with producer and singer SCALLY, and released his debut EP 'D.A.V.E' which featured the SCALLY-produced 'Car Bomb'. 'Car Bomb' was accompanied by a video directed by Marco Grey, and received radio support from Pharrell Williams and Young Fathers. He also collaborated with The Streets frontman Mike Skinner on a club night called TONGA.

=== Debut album, collaborations, touring ===
Dave's debut album, 'Murkage Dave Changed My Life', was released at the end of 2018. It includes features from Manga Saint Hilare and Jaykae, and production from Skepta and Star Slinger. He toured the album across 2019, including support slots for The Streets, Peace and Tricky, and released a special edition of the album which included features from JGrrey, Frankie Stew and Harvey Gunn, Peyton, NARX, Lioness and Lansky Jones & Jeff Donna of the New York rap collective World's Fair. The album was critically praised for its unique sound and vulnerability. "He’s crafted a sparse, introspective vibe that feels distinctly British," wrote Felicity Martin of Dummy Mag. Dave has also collaborated with French rapper Nekfeu and US DJ and producer AC Slater.

At the end of 2019 after his 'Keep Up The Bad Work' tour, Dave collaborated with Manga Saint Hilare for the surprise project 'We Need To Look After Us'. The ten track project promotes self-care and community and features production from Tre Mission, Jon Phonics, Star Slinger, New Machine, Hologram Lo, Loubenski, Moshino Royale, Douvelle and Goldteeth.

=== Second album, B sides, supports ===
His second album ‘The City Needs A Hero’ (2022) debuted at #10 on the UK iTunes Chart, and #15 on the UK Independent Chart and was critically praised. It was launched with the stand-out double A side single 'Please Don't Move To London It's A Trap' / Awful Things' featuring Caroline Polacheck. In support of this album Dave toured the UK in late 2022, which saw him play venues including Islington Assembly Hall in London.

In 2023 Dave released two companion pieces to this album: a B sides record 'The City Needs... Part Deux' and a remix EP 'The City Needs A Remix' which included remix work from the likes of Zed Bias, Atmosphere, Star Slinger, and more.

In 2024 Dave opened up for Young Fathers at the Royal Albert Hall, and went on to support Yard Act across their European tour. In 2025 he opened up for WU LYF at one of their comeback shows.

=== New music and Refuge Worldwide ===
Dave is currently recording his 3rd album ‘Brut Thoughts’, and has also started his own radio show ‘The Outlet’ on Refuge Worldwide, showcasing a mix of his influences and unreleased songs from friends and collaborators. Guests so far have included Mona Chalabi and Ellery James Roberts from WU LYF.
