= Russian Roulette (The Alchemist album) =

Studio album by the Alchemist
- Released: July 17, 2012
- Recorded: 2011–July 2012
- Genre: Hip-hop
- Length: 45:32
- Label: Decon
- Producer: The Alchemist

The Alchemist chronology
Chemical Warfare (2009)	Russian Roulette (2012)	Albert Einstein (2013)

Singles from Russian Roulette
- 1. "Flight Confirmation" Released: 2012; 2. "Don Seymour's Theme" Released: 2012

Russian Roulette is the third solo studio album by American hip-hop producer and recording artist the Alchemist. It was released on July 17, 2012, through Decon. Produced entirely by the Alchemist, it features guest appearances from Action Bronson, AG Da Coroner, Big Twins, Boldy James, Chuuwee, Danny Brown, Durag Dynasty, Evidence, Fashawn, Guilty Simpson, MidaZ, Meyhem Lauren, Mr. Muthafuckin' eXquire, Roc Marciano, Schoolboy Q and Willie the Kid.

The project is constructed from samples of music of the Soviet Union (hence the title), making it a concept album. The album is not focused on rap and lyrics, rather it's more of an artistic rendition of tracks that are collages of samples, excerpts and elements from Soviet songs, among other sources (like a Memorex commercial). Fifteen of the thirty tracks do contain rapped lyrics on them. The cover art was inspired by poster art for Andrei Tarkovsky's 1972 Soviet science fiction film Solaris. In the album's booklet, there is different artwork for each song on the album.

The album did not reach the Billboard 200 albums chart, however, it peaked at number 65 on the Top R&B/Hip-Hop Albums chart in the United States. It spawned two singles: "Flight Confirmation" and "Don Seymour's Theme".

== Critical reception ==
Professional ratings
Aggregate scores
Source	Rating
Metacritic	76/100
Review scores
Source	Rating
AllMusic	4/5 stars
Consequence of Sound	C+
HipHopDX	4.5/5
Pitchfork	6.8/10
PopMatters	7/10

Russian Roulette was met with generally favorable reviews from music critics. At Metacritic, which assigns a normalized rating out of 100 to reviews from mainstream publications, the album received an average score of 76, based on nine reviews.

Jake Paine of HipHopDX gave the album 4.5 out of 5, resuming: "although it feels druggy and improvisational at times, the outcome is soberingly great". AllMusic's David Jeffries found "this cohesive piece is still dotted with stand-out moments". Adam Kivel of Consequence of Sound stated: "despite the big names (he invited a veritable indie hip-hop A-list), Maman's vision shines without overpowering". Dean Van Nguyen of PopMatters felt the album "turns out to be less about stepping out from behind the velvet curtain, and more about the magic he can weave from behind it". David Drake of Pitchfork wrote: "the level on which Russian Roulette works best is experienced in a stoner's sound-design-obsessed bubble, where each crackle of a record and particular melodic line of a funk, fusion, soundtrack, or novelty sample seems to contain a cavernous importance simply for displacing air with sound".

=== Accolades ===
Publication	List	Rank	Ref.
HipHopDX	HipHopDX's Top 25 Albums of 2012	*	

== Track listing ==
All tracks are written by Alan Maman, except where noted.

No.	Title	Writer(s)	Length
1.	"Soundcheck"		1:54
2.	"Apollo's Last Stand" (featuring AG Da Coroner)		1:44
3.	"Crushed Kremlin" (featuring Meyhem Lauren)		1:12
4.	"Decisions Over Veal Orloff" (featuring Action Bronson)	Maman; Ariyan Arslani	1:26
5.	"Learned by Listening"		0:54
6.	"Training Montage - Getting Stronger"		2:05
7.	"Ivan's Workout Plan"		0:30
8.	"Never Grow Up" (featuring Evidence)	Maman; Michael Perretta	1:30
9.	"The Turning Point" (featuring Roc Marciano)	Maman; Rakeem Calief Myer	2:32
10.	"Live from Dynamo Stadium 2"		0:40
11.	"Don Seymour's Theme" (featuring MidaZ)		2:22
12.	"Before the Fight Prelude"		0:40
13.	"Adrian's Words - Champion Song"		2:19
14.	"Flight of the Bumblebee"		0:48
15.	"Kalashnikov Guns" (featuring Guilty Simpson)	Maman; Byron Simpson	1:41
16.	"Flight Confirmation" (featuring Danny Brown and Schoolboy Q)	Maman; Daniel Sewell; Quincy Hanley	2:23
17.	"Press Conference Prelude"		1:00
18.	"Freakish Strength"		1:05
19.	"Junkyard Fight Scene" (featuring Durag Dynasty)		2:37
20.	"Oleg's Flight" (featuring Fashawn)	Maman; Santiago Leyva	2:13
21.	"Moscow Mornings - Sunrise"		1:47
22.	"Moscow Evenings - Sunset"		1:49
23.	"The Kosmos Pt. 1 - Lift Off" (featuring Chuuwee)		1:14
24.	"The Kosmos Pt. 2 - Power Glove" (featuring Boldy James)	Maman; James Clay Jones III	1:11
25.	"The Kosmos Pt. 3 - In Orbit"		0:24
26.	"The Kosmos Pt. 4 - Moon Probe" (featuring Big Twinz)		1:11
27.	"The Kosmos Pt. 5 - 1st Contact - The Chase"		1:04
28.	"The Kosmos Pt. 6 - Life on Another Planet" (featuring Willie the Kid)	Maman; Willie B. Jackson	1:49
29.	"The Kosmos, Pt 7 - The Explanation" (featuring Mr. Muthafuckin' eXquire)		2:08
30.	"The Kosmos Pt. 8 - Return to Earth (Outro)"		1:24
Total length:			45:32

== Charts ==
Chart (2012)	Peak position
US Top R&B/Hip-Hop Albums (Billboard)	65
