= Silver Tongue Devil =

Studio album by Madchild
- Released: July 24, 2015
- Recorded: 2015
- Studio: The Chamber Studios (Nanaimo, British Columbia)
- Genre: Hip hop
- Length: 54:27
- Label: Battle Axe Records
- Producer: Ivory Daniel (exec.); Kevin Zinger (exec.); Madchild (exec.); C-Lance; Aspect; Rob The Viking; Evidence; The Makerz

Madchild chronology
Switched On (2014)	Silver Tongue Devil (2015)	The Darkest Hour (2017)

Professional ratings
Review scores
Source	Rating
Exclaim!	7/10
HipHopDX	3.5/5
RapReviews	7.5/10

Silver Tongue Devil is the third solo studio album by Canadian rapper Madchild. It was released on July 24, 2015, through Battle Axe Records. Recording sessions took place at the Chamber Studios in Nanaimo, British Columbia. Production was handled by C-Lance, Aspect, Rob The Viking, Evidence and The Makerz. It features guest appearances from Young De, Slaine, CeeKay Jones and JD Era. The album peaked at number three on the Canadian Albums Chart. In 2026, the song "Jackel" earned Gold certification in Canada.

== Track listing ==
No.	Title	Producer(s)	Length
1.	"Untold Story"	C-Lance	2:17
2.	"Night Time Kill"	C-Lance	2:27
3.	"Devils and Angels"	Evidence	2:51
4.	"Lose My Mind" (featuring JD Era)	C-Lance	3:27
5.	"SLUT"	C-Lance	4:20
6.	"Everytime" (featuring CeeKay Jones)	The Makerz	3:30
7.	"Mental" (featuring Demrick)	C-Lance	4:06
8.	"Painful Skies"	C-Lance	4:23
9.	"Jackel"	Aspect	4:03
10.	"Triple Threat" (featuring Slaine and Demrick)	C-Lance	3:47
11.	"Electricity"	Aspect	3:54
12.	"50 Seven"	Rob the Viking	3:25
13.	"Don't Stop" (featuring Slaine)	Rob the Viking	3:17
14.	"Slayer" (featuring Demrick)	C-Lance	4:00
15.	"Zero"	Aspect	4:48
Total length:			54:28

iTunes edition bonus tracks
No.	Title	Producer(s)	Length
16.	"Murder Mouth"		2:24
17.	"Brain Dead"	Aspect	2:50
Total length:			59:42

== Personnel ==
- Shane "Madchild" Bunting – main artist, executive producer
- Joseph "JD Era" Dako – featured artist (track 4)
- Ceekay Jones – featured artist (track 6)
- Demerick "Young De" Ferm – featured artist (tracks: 7, 10, 14)
- George "Slaine" Carroll – featured artist (tracks: 10, 13)
- Craig "C-Lance" Lanciani – producer (tracks: 1, 2, 4, 5, 7, 8, 10, 14)
- Michael "Evidence" Perretta – producer (track 3), photography
- The Makerz – producers (track 6)
- Aspect – producer (tracks: 9, 11, 15, 17)
- Robin "Rob the Viking" Hooper – producer (tracks: 12, 13), arranger, co-producer, mixing
- Tom Baker – mastering
- Ivory Daniel – executive producer
- Kevin Zinger – executive producer
- L'amour Supreme – artwork

== Charts ==
Chart performance for Silver Tongue Devil
Chart (2015)	Peak position
Canadian Albums (Billboard)	3
US Top R&B/Hip-Hop Albums (Billboard)	20
US Top Rap Albums (Billboard)	17
US Heatseekers Albums (Billboard)	5
