= The Layover EP =

EP by Evidence
- Released: November 25, 2008
- Recorded: 2008
- Studio: Soundproof East; Chop Shop Studios; The Ether; The Lab NYC; Dirt Class West; Daddy's Crib; Soundproof West; Studio 1; Dirty Science Lab 12
- Genre: Hip hop
- Label: Decon
- Producer: Alchemist; DJ Babu; Evidence; Khrysis; Sid Roams

Evidence chronology
The Weatherman LP (2007)	The Layover EP (2008)	Cats & Dogs (2011)

Professional ratings
Review scores
Source	Rating
AllMusic	4/5 stars
Alternative Press	4/5
HipHopDX	3.5/5
RapReviews	8.5/10

The Layover EP is the first solo extended play by American rapper and record producer Evidence. It was released on November 25, 2008, via Decon. Recording sessions took place at Soundproof East, Chop Shop Studios, The Ether, The Lab NYC, Dirt Class West, Daddy's Crib, Soundproof West, Studio 1, Dirty Science Lab 12. Production was handled by The Alchemist, Khrysis, DJ Babu, Sid Roams, and Evidence himself. It features guest appearances from Aloe Blacc, Blu, Defari, Elzhi, Fashawn, Krondon, Phonte and Will.i.am. The album did not reach the Billboard 200 chart, but did peak at No. 27 on the Heatseekers Albums in the United States, and received generally favourable reviews from music critics.

== Background ==
The idea for The Layover EP originally came about while Evidence was on tour with Little Brother, and was originally going to be a 5 track release produced entirely by North Carolina producer Khrysis for free download. He later strayed from the idea and decided to make it an official release. Evidence cites Ice Cube's Kill at Will, Pete Rock & CL Smooth's All Souled Out and Bone Thugs-n-Harmony's Creepin on ah Come Up as influences for the project, saying they were examples of extended plays "that were really quality" and served as the perfect vehicle to get the next album released shortly after.

DJ Premier ranked the album 2nd in his top 20 albums of 2008 list.

In the video for "The Far Left" when the Alchemist says "To the atmosphere so I can really find out" he holds up a drawing of a slug and an ant. This is a reference to the hip hop group Atmosphere, which consist of rapper Slug and producer Ant.

== The Layover Mixtape ==
In addition with the release of The Layover EP, Evidence collaborated with DJ Skee to produce The Layover Mixtape which was available on Evidence's Myspace for free download. Other collaborators featured on the mixtape include Defari, Bishop Lamont, Chace Infinite, Dilated Peoples, U-N-I, Big Pooh, Aloe Blacc, Fashawn, Mickey Factz, Theo, Kes Kaos, Phonte, Montage One, Mitchy Slick, Big Twin, Diz Gibran, Styliztik Jones, Krondon, Rakaa Iriscience and Crooked I. The mixtape track listing varies with songs from The Layover EP, commercial tracks that Evidence rapped over, and Dilated Peoples' Fresh Rhymes and Videotape EP.

== Track listing ==
No.	Title	Writer(s)	Producer(s)	Length
1.	"The Layover"	Michael Perretta; Christopher Tyson	Khrysis	2:58
2.	"For Whom The Bell Tolls" (featuring Phonte, Blu and will.i.am)	Perretta; Phonte Coleman; Johnson Barnes; William Adams; Tyson	Khrysis	4:25
3.	"So Fresh (Step Brothers)"	Perretta; Alan Maman	The Alchemist	3:57
4.	"Solitary Confinement" (featuring Krondon)	Perretta; Marvin Jones; Joey Chavez; Tavish Graham	Sid Roams	2:58
5.	"Don't Hate" (featuring Defari)	Perretta; Duane A. Johnson Jr.	Evidence	3:53
6.	"My Favourite Part of Traveling" (Interlude)			1:21
7.	"The Far Left" (featuring The Alchemist and Fashawn)	Perretta; Maman	The Alchemist	3:36
8.	"Rain Or Shine"	Perretta; Chris Oroc	DJ Babu	3:23
9.	"To Be Determined" (featuring Elzhi and Aloe Blacc)	Perretta; Jason Powers; Egbert Nathaniel Dawkins	The Alchemist	4:10
10.	"The Cold Weather"	Perretta	Evidence	3:52

Videos
No.	Title	Director(s)	Length
11.	"The Layover"	Jason Goldwatch	3:00
12.	"Solitary Confinement" (featuring Krondon)	Jason Goldwatch	3:00
13.	"Don't Hate" (featuring Defari)	Jason Goldwatch	4:11
14.	"The Far Left" (featuring The Alchemist and Fashawn)	Punit Dhesi	3:34

Bonus videos
No.	Title	Director(s)	Length
15.	"Mr. Slow Flow"	Jason Goldwatch	4:22
16.	"Chase the Clouds Away"	Nick Goosen	4:34

== Personnel ==
- Michael "Evidence" Peretta – vocals, producer (tracks: 5, 10), recording (tracks: 1, 3–5, 7, 10), executive producer
- Phonte Coleman – vocals (track 2)
- Johnson "Blu" Barnes – vocals (track 2)
- William "will.i.am" Adams – vocals & recording (track 2)
- Marvin "Krondon" Jones – vocals (track 4)
- Duane A. "Defari" Johnson Jr. – vocals & recording (track 5)
- Alan "The Alchemist" Maman – vocals (track 7), producer & recording (tracks: 3, 7, 9), mixing (tracks: 7, 9), executive producer
- Santiago "Fashawn" Leyva – vocals (track 7)
- Jason "Elzhi" Powers – vocals (track 9)
- Egbert Nathaniel "Aloe Blacc" Dawkins – vocals & recording (track 9)
- Joey Chavez – additional vocals & producer (track 4)
- Tavish "Bravo" Graham – additional vocals & producer (track 4)
- Cat Summers – additional vocals (track 6)
- Kamilah – additional vocals (track 8)
- Noelle Scaggs – additional vocals (track 10)
- Rakaa "Iriscience" Taylor – additional vocals (track 10)
- Kurt "DJ Revolution" Hoffman – scratches (tracks: 1, 5, 10)
- Chris "DJ Babu" Oroc – scratches (track 3), producer (track 8), recording (tracks: 6, 8)
- Christopher "Khrysis" Tyson – producer & recording (tracks: 1, 2)
- Brock Korsan – recording (tracks: 2, 4, 7, 8), management
- Tommy Hoffman – recording (track 9)
- Eddie Sancho – mixing (tracks: 1–6, 8, 10)
- Tom Coyne – mastering
- Yoram Benz – cover design
- Kalani Fujimori – layout design
- Brian "B+" Cross – photography

== Charts ==
Chart (2008)	Peak position
US Heatseekers Albums (Billboard)	27
