= WU LYF =

English heavy pop band

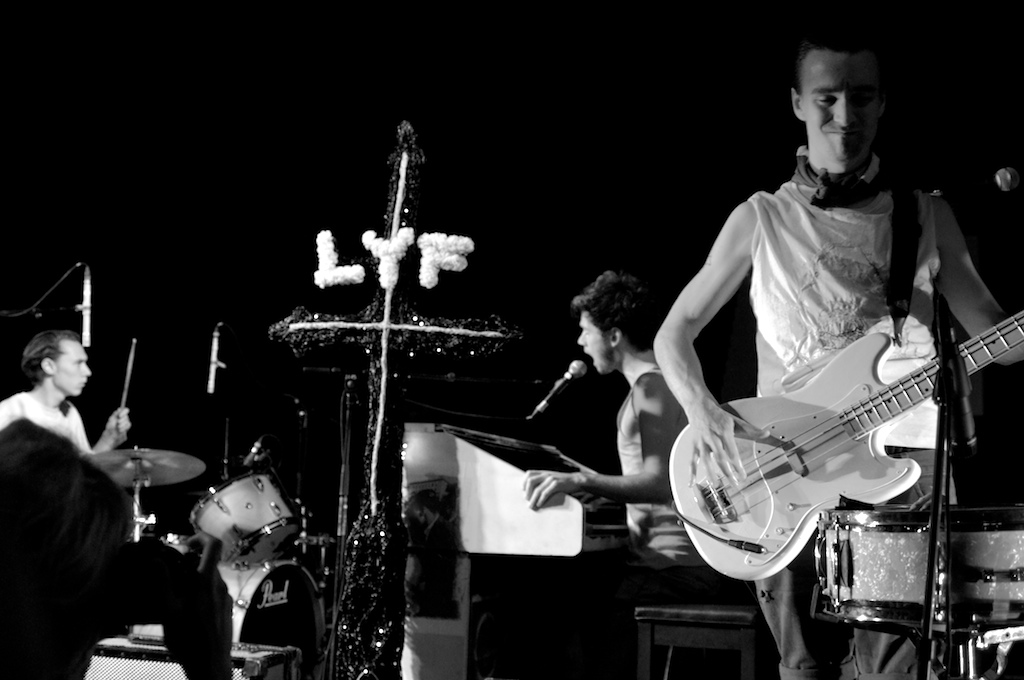
- Midi Festival 2010

Background information
- Origin: Manchester, England
- Genres: Indie rock, art rock, post-rock
- Years active: 2008–2012, 2025–present
- Label: LYF Recordings
- Spinoffs: Los Porcos, LUH.
- Members: Ellery Roberts; Evans Kati; Tom McClung; Joe Manning
- Website: worldunite.org

WU LYF (pronounced "woo life"; an acronym for "World Unite Lucifer Youth Foundation") are an English rock band from Manchester. Forming in 2008, the band originally became known for creating a mystery about themselves by declining requests for interviews and releasing little information to the press. In the band's initial run, they released one studio album, Go Tell Fire to the Mountain. Following its 2011 release, they disbanded a year later. In 2025, the band reformed; their second album, A Wave That Will Never Break, is slated for release in April 2026. The band has described their music as "heavy pop".

== History ==
=== Beginnings ===
WU LYF formed in the summer of 2008 and consisted of "Jeau" (Joe Manning), "Lung" (Tom McClung), "Elle Jaie" (Ellery Roberts) and "Evnse" (Evans Kati). The band started their own record label titled Ridiculous Records. The band's first gig outside Manchester came in July 2010 at the MIDI Festival on the French Riviera, which NME called "undoubtedly one of the gigs of the year". Subsequent shows include France's Transmusicales Festival, Berlin's Transmediale festival and headline shows in Glasgow and London. In July 2010 the band announced the formation of the Lucifer Youth Foundation (L Y F), giving new members an illustrated bandit mask and a 12" single featuring the tracks "Concrete Gold" and "Heavy Pop".

The band started recording their debut album in November 2010, using the money generated by the L Y F membership scheme. Deciding against the conventional studio set up, they instead took over Saint Peter's church in Ancoats, Manchester, to record their album. The album is self-produced. The band declined all offers from established record labels and released their debut album, entitled Go Tell Fire to the Mountain, themselves on 13 June 2011 through the L Y F recordings imprint. In support of the record's release, the band played several dates in the UK to critical acclaim, culminating in the curation of the Great Bridgewater Street Tunnel as part of the Manchester International Festival.

=== Go Tell Fire to the Mountain ===
The band had the concept for Go Tell Fire to the Mountain long before the recording process took place. Roberts states that it was written "in a narrative sense and [was approached] as a complete work rather than a bunch of songs thrown together." When searching for a place to record, the group was dissatisfied with the sound they were getting from traditional studios, leading them to settle on an old abandoned church in Manchester. The amount of open airspace in the church allowed for a healthy dose of reverb, which is a critical part of the album's larger than life sound. Despite the media's insistence of the location's relevance to the religious theme of the band, Roberts denies it. Although the church altered the "vibe of the songs", the band asserts that Saint Peter's church sonically fit the album's needs.

=== Breakup ===
On 24 November 2012, a video for a new track appeared on YouTube accompanied by a supposed letter from lead singer Ellery Roberts, directed towards his bandmates. It stated: "I am gone. This isn't the end. This is the beginning."(sic) At this moment in time it was unclear as to whether this was the end for WU LYF, however their Facebook page also disappeared around the same time the video surfaced. A new track titled "T R I U M P H" accompanied the letter, in which Roberts announced, "WU LYF is dead to me."

Following Roberts' departure, the remaining WU LYF members continued on as Los Porcos, a former side-project, releasing 2 tracks in April 2013. Tom McClung created a solo project called Francis Lung, and Evans Kati and Joe Manning formed Dream Lovers, debuting their first show at Midi Music Festival in 2015. Ellery Roberts joined girlfriend Ebony Hoorn to form LUH., which stands for "Lost Under Heaven". LUH.'s debut album, entitled Spiritual Songs for Lovers to Sing, was co-produced by The Haxan Cloak and was released in May 2016 by Mute Records.

=== Reunion ===
In March 2025, the band's website updated to show a countdown timer beneath their white logo on a black background. Selecting the text on the page revealed the hidden message "SOMETHING COMES FROM NOTHING A NEW LIFE IS COMING." The countdown ended on April 1, 2025 with the band releasing their first single in 13 years titled A New Life Is Coming, the band would also announce 3 shows at The Kings Arms in Salford, and several festival dates in Europe.

On 1 April 2026 WU LYF released a new single, "The Fool" ahead of their new album. The version published on Spotify features parody vocals and a message declaring "Slopify is dead" and urging listeners to hear the real song on the band's website. Their newly-designed website also featured journals, tickets, merchandise and fan forums.

=== A Wave That Will Never Break ===
On 10 April 2026, WU LYF released A Wave That Will Never Break.

== Press coverage ==
Much of the early press coverage on the band focused on the fact that outlets reporting on them did not know much about the band. The New York Observer described the phenomenon as "carefully designed anonymity". One critic highlighted their "ability to maintain mystique at a time when everything is out in the open". The NME's Matt Wilkinson picked the band as one that was likely to define 2011. Stereogum featured WU LYF as a "Band to Watch" in May 2010. They were described as "the cult band of the moment in England" by Rolling Stone magazine in Italy. The Dutch magazine Kicking the Habit described them as sounding like "Tom Waits in a church under the guidance of stoned garage". The band appeared on BBC2's "Culture Show", showcasing a song off their debut album and conducting a rare interview.

Latter-day press became more concerned with WU LYF's live shows, which were described as "intense" and "cathartic". Pitchfork gave Go Tell Fire to the Mountain an 8.4 rating and the "Best New Music" accolade, stating, "WU LYF in the manner of Iceage or Odd Future as musicians that have made me genuinely excited about their potential impact on listeners, the same things that make them seem juvenile---the artistic and personal volatility, the semblance of a roving gang more than a band, the invitation to indulge in your most disturbing impulses and yet feel morally superior to an ill-defined majority---are the same things that feel totally galvanizing. And it's easy to imagine Go Tell Fire to the Mountain giving disaffected listeners the promise of an entry to something beyond themselves in a way that James Blake or Bon Iver can't." BBC Radio 1's Zane Lowe named "Dirt" the "Hottest Track in the World" in 2011.

This Wikipedia page on the band has been deleted several times, which itself has been covered by the press.

== Members ==
- Ellery James Roberts — lead vocals, organ
- Evans Kati — guitar, harmonica, backing vocals
- Tom McClung — bass, guitar, backing vocals
- Joe Manning — drums, piano

== Discography ==
=== Albums ===
- Go Tell Fire to the Mountain (CD and vinyl LP, released 13 June 2011) (UK chart peak: #98)
- A Wave That Will Never Break (released 10 April 2026)

=== Singles ===
- "Heavy Pop" / "Concrete Gold" (12" single, 31 May 2010)
- "Dirt" (promo CD only, June 2011)
- "We Bros" (12" single, 20 September 2011)
- "T R I U M P H" (single, 24 November 2012)
- "A New Life Is Coming" (single, 3 April 2025)
- "Tib St. Tabernacle" (single, 14 January 2026)
- "Love Your Fate" (single, 25 February 2026)
