= Dope Sick =

Studio album by Madchild
- Released: August 28, 2012
- Genre: Hip hop
- Length: 54:40
- Label: Battle Axe Records; Suburban Noize Records
- Producer: Kevin Zinger (exec.); Brad Xavier (exec.); Madchild (exec.); 2oolman; Aspect; C-Lance; Chin Injeti; Evidence; Matt Brevner; Rob The Viking

Madchild chronology
Little Monster (2012)	Dope Sick (2012)	Lawn Mower Man (2013)

Professional ratings
Review scores
Source	Rating
HipHopDX	3/5

Dope Sick is the debut solo studio album by Canadian rapper Madchild. It was released on August 28, 2012 via Battle Axe Records and Suburban Noize Records. Production was handled by Aspect, C-Lance, Rob The Viking, Chin Injeti, Evidence, Matt Brevner and 2oolman. It features guest appearances from Bishop Lamont, D-Sisive, Dilated Peoples, Dutch Robinson, Matt Brevner, Phil da Agony, Prevail, Slaine, Sophia Danai and DJ Revolution. The album peaked at number three on the Canadian Albums Chart. The album was certified Gold in Canada as of 2019. The song "Dickhead" was certified Platinum in 2024.

== Track listing ==
No.	Title	Writer(s)	Producer(s)	Length
1.	"Devil's Reject" (featuring DJ Revolution)	Shane Bunting; Kurt Hoffman; Craig Lanciani	C-Lance	4:20
2.	"Grenade Launcher" (featuring Slaine and Prevail)	Bunting; Kiley Hendriks; Lanciani	C-Lance	3:42
3.	"Monster"	Bunting; Lanciani	C-Lance	3:50
4.	"Runaway"	Bunting; Robin Hooper	Rob the Viking	3:32
5.	"Oxylude"	Hooper; Reece Zazulak	Rob the Viking	0:30
6.	"Wake Up"	Bunting; Hooper; Chris Gestrin	Rob the Viking	3:53
7.	"Battleaxe" (featuring Dilated Peoples, Bishop Lamont and D-Sisive)	Bunting; Michael Peretta; Rakaa Taylor; Philip Brandon Martin; Derek Christoff	Evidence	4:29
8.	"Jitters" (featuring Dutch Robinson and Matt Brevner)	Bunting; Matt Brevner; Theodore J. Robinson	Matt Brevner	4:46
9.	"Little Monster Blend"	Bunting; Zazulak	Aspect	4:24
10.	"Judgment Day" (featuring Sophia Danai)	Bunting; Sophia Anastasiou; Pranam Injeti	Chin Injeti	3:01
11.	"Dickhead"	Bunting; Hooper	Rob the Viking	3:31
12.	"Fuck Madchild" (featuring Phil da Agony)	Bunting; Jason Lawrence Smith; Zazulak	Aspect	1:58
13.	"Mongoloid"	Bunting; Zazulak	Aspect	2:27
14.	"Freak"	Bunting; Lanciani	C-Lance	3:55
15.	"Reaper"	Bunting	2oolman	2:32
16.	"Wanted"	Bunting; Zazulak	Aspect	3:51
Total length:				54:40

== Charts ==
Chart performance for Dope Sick
Chart (2012)	Peak position
Canadian Albums (Billboard)	3
US Top R&B/Hip-Hop Albums (Billboard)	29
US Top Rap Albums (Billboard)	23
US Heatseekers Albums (Billboard)	7
US Independent Albums (Billboard)	37
