= JD Era =

Canadian rapper and lyricist

- Also known as: Era the Great
- Born: April 15, 1985 (age 41)
- Origin: Toronto, Ontario, Canada
- Genres: Hip hop, R&B
- Occupations: Rapper; lyricist
- Instrument: Vocals
- Years active: 2005-present
- Label: Up North Music
- Website: eraday.com

JD Era (born April 15, 1985) is a Canadian rapper and lyricist. He has worked with artists such as Nas, Gza, Kardinal Offishall, The Clipse, and has also cut several tracks with longtime friend Drake. In 2008 he won Best Rap at the Toronto Independent Music Awards, and also won the TAG Records’ Survival of The Freshest competition. He has also released a number of mixtapes and singles, and in the Juno Awards of 2013 his album No Handouts was nominated for Rap Recording of the Year.

== Early life ==
JD Era was born on April 15, 1985, and raised in Mississauga, a suburb of Toronto, Ontario. He began listening to rap at a young age, particularly to groups such as Wu Tang Clan and the song "C.R.E.A.M." Rapping by the age of fourteen, he began writing his own rhymes at sixteen. He started freestyling in local rap battles as he grew older, stating "I always knew in the back of my mind that I would do [rap]. Rap was taking up too much time and money for me to not take it seriously. I just always wanted to get better and loved the music." A friend, Bad Nuze, brought him into his studio for a number of recording sessions, and JD Era stated "I never looked back." About his name, "JD is my initials and Era is a timeline. Just my way of saying its my time." Around 2003 he signed with his long-term manager, Mike "Major" Malabre of The Product.

== Music career ==
=== 2005-10: Early years ===
JD Era has stated that one of his earlier difficulties was going from being a battling Emcee to writing his own full songs. In 2005 he recorded his first singles: "Ride Clean" and "Take Me Home." They became his first songs to receive airplay on urban radio stations, including Flow 93.5 and 91.5 The Beat. His first mixtape, Prince of the North, was released on July 14, 2007, on The Product and Black Market Music. A single from the album, "Paper Chase," had a music video filmed as well, increasing his exposure nationally.

In 2008 he was nominated for two DJ Stylus Awards, and that year at the Toronto Independent Music Awards he won Best Rap. He continued to freestyle even as he worked in the recording studio, and also in 2008 he was named winner of the TAG Records’ Survival of The Freshest freestyle competition. He was also later named the Champion at the Marc Ecko Freestyle Competition. Around 2008, Major, JD Era, and Fase became co-owners in Black Market Music Group, which has ties with Universal Music Group.

His track "25th Hour" was included in the mixtape Dame Hustle The Hip Hop Experiment by Stricklee Hip Hop in February 2009. Around 2010 he was a member of the group Wise Guys, along with Bishop Brigante, Ken Masters, Jonny Roxx, Young Tony (aka Hush) and Drake. According to Hip Hop Canada, "The group’s biggest claim to fame as a unit was several diss songs including 'Goodnight & Goodluck' and 'Good Riddance.'"

He released the mixtape I'm Coming to America in 2010 on Black Market, which increased his exposure in the United States, and had production from artists such as Drake. At Flow 93.5’s Real Frequency Awards, Coming to America was nominated as Best Mixtape.

=== 2011-12: Th1rt3en-Black Tape, touring ===
JD Era released his mixtape Th1rt3en-Black Tape on February 22, 2011, through Black Market and Universal Canada. The music videos for the mixtape's tracks "You Know This and "Fame & Fortune" both charted on Much Music and other music countdowns.

For 2011 and 2012 he wrote the theme song for The Score network's Court Surfing NBA program, which was broadcast in Canada. On April 26, 2011, Black Market released "The Score: Couch Surfing Theme," later followed by the second season's version.

He and his manager met Raekwon in April 2011 at a show in Winnipeg, stating"He had heard my name going around the city and wanted to meet me." Later that summer they toured together with 13 dates in Canada and forty in the United States. On January 17, 2012, JD Era self-released the single "Payday 2," which featured Raekwon. By May 2012 he was touring across Canada, having at that point been to British Columbia, Winnipeg, Montreal and Saskatchewan. By the summer of 2012 he had wrapped his Unexpected Victory Tour with Raekwon. As of 2012, he is the only Canadian artist signed to ICE20, the record label associated with Raekwon.

=== 2012-13: No Handouts ===
In 2012 he also began working on his next album. Raekwon assisted with A&R, with producers such as 9th Wonder, Lex Luger, and Burd X Keyz. No Handouts was released on October 2, 2012, on Black Market. An invite-only listening party for the album, however, had been held at the IC H20 office in Toronto on May 1. Several videos were filmed for the album, including for the track "Smoking Good." He later toured in support of the album across Canada, and in the Juno Awards of 2013 No Handouts was nominated for the Rap Recording of the Year.

=== 2013-present: Singles, Barz Vol. 1 ===
In July 2013 he was a guest artist on the Tony Touch track "Unorthodox," also featuring Ghostface Killah, RZA, and Raekwon. The track's album reached #14 on Top Rap Albums. On August 6, 2013, he and Bishop Lamont also were guest artists on "Kill Kill Kill" by Mad Child, included on the album Lawn Mower Man, which reached #3 on the Canadian charts.

In December 2013, former collaborator Bishop Brigante joined JD Era on the Toronto stop of Era's Do You Know Mary? Tour. The tour later traveled to Ontario, with other guests such as Rich Kidd. In January 2014, he headlined a show with Honey Cocaine, and the next month played four Ontario dates while headlining with Rich Kidd. He has performed live with artists such as Nas, GZA, Kardinal Offishall, Tyga, Drake, Method Man, Red Man, Raekwon, Rick Ross, Busta Rhymes, Gucci Mane, The Clipse, Mac Miller, Terminology, Currensy and Freddie Gibbs.

His mixtape Barz Vol. 1 was self-released in March 2014, and made available for free online. The album was mixed by DJ T.LO, and music videos were released as well, with "Rice In Chinatown" directed by Machete Cortez, and "That Ain't My Style" produced by RoadsArt. At the same time, he also launched his website, EraDay.com. In June 2014 JD Era released the music video for his track "Mary," on his #EraFriday series of singles. The music video was directed by DubPlate Films. As of 2014 he is signed to Black Market Music, and is still managed by Major of The Product Management.

== Personal life ==
While based in Mississauga, he has spent time living and working on music in New York City, and has performed in the UK.

== Awards and nominations ==
| Year | Award | Nominated work | Category | Result |
|---|---|---|---|---|
| 2005 | Marc Ecko Freestyle Competition | JD Era | Freestyle | Champion |
| 2006 | Pony Freestyle Contest | JD Era | Freestyle | Champion |
| 2007 | TAG Records’ Survival of The Freshest | JD Era | | Won |
| 2008 | Flow 93.5 | Coming to America | Best Mixtape | Nominated |
| 2008 | Toronto Independent Music Awards | JD Era | Best Rap | Won |
| 2010 | IMTA Awards | JD Era | Best Rap Artist | Won |
| 2010 | DJ Stylus Award | JD Era | Best Rap Artist | Nominated |
| 2011 | DJ Stylus Award | JD Era | Best Rap Artist | Nominated |
| 2013 | MOBO Awards | JD Era | Best Rap Artist | Won |
| 2013 | Juno Awards | No Handouts by JD Era | Rap Recording of the Year | Nominated |

== Discography ==
=== Solo albums ===
Albums by JD Era
| Year | Album title | Release details | Certifications |
|---|---|---|---|
| 2007 | Prince of the North | Released: July 14, 2007; Label: The Product / Black Market; Format: CD, digital | |
| 2008 | Coming to America (JD Era and Wristpect) | Released: August 2008; Label: self-released; Format: digital | |
| 2011 | Th1rt3en-Black Tape | Released: Feb 22, 2011; Label: Black Market / Universal Canada; Format: CD, digital | |
| 2012 | No Handouts | Released: Oct 2, 2012; Label: Black Market; Format: CD, digital | Nominated: 2013 Juno Award |
| 2014 | Barz Vol. 1 | Released: March 2014; Label: Self-released; Format: digital | |

=== Singles ===
Incomplete list of songs by JD Era as a primary artist and performer
| Year | Title | Album | Label |
|---|---|---|---|
| 2007 | "Paper Chase" | Prince of the North | The Product / Black Market |
| 2009 | "25th Hour" | Dame Hustle The Hip Hop Experiment | Stricklee Hip Hop |
| 2010 | "Beats Keep Bumpin" (with Magnum 357) | The Storm | None |
| 2010 | "First and Last" | Rap Is Alive Vol. 1 | DJ Mitch Cuts |
| 2011 | "The Score: Couch Surfing Theme" | Non-album single | Black Market |
| 2011 | "Cover Girl" (ft. Bobby V) | Non-album single / Th1rt3en-Black Tape | Black Market |
| 2012 | "Payday 2" (ft. Raekwon) | Non-album single | self-released |
| 2012 | "Couch Surfing 2012" | Non-album single | self-released |
| 2012 | "Comeback Season" | Non-album single | Black Market |
| 2012 | "Smoking Good" | No Handouts | Black Market |
| 2012 | "Hate Me Later" (ft. Mac Miller) | No Handouts | Black Market |
| 2012 | "The Greatest" (ft. Raekwon) | No Handouts | Black Market |
| | "Money" (ft. Mezzaih, Fever) | Liza Heat Vol 2: Rookie Of The Year | DJ Naeem & DJ Phila |

=== Guest appearances ===
Incomplete list of songs with featured performances by JD Era
| Year | Single name | Primary artist(s) | Album | Label | Notes |
|---|---|---|---|---|---|
| 2006 | "What Up (International Remix)" (ft. JD Era, Shawn Jackson) | Frank-N-Dank | EP 12" | Chisel Sound | |
| 2008 | "Get Money" (ft. JD Era, Tona) | Art of Fresh | Back to the Earth | Soulclap Inc. (CA) | |
| 2011 | "Papito" (ft. Ceazar, Reason, JD Era) | DJ Symphony | Non-album single | Ceazar | |
| 2012 | "Money Girl" (ft. JD Era, Captain Hooks) | Chase Milly | Non-album single | Black Market | |
| 2012 | "Just A Toast" (ft. JD Era) | Raekwon | Unexpected Victory | Be Music | |
| 2012 | "Goodfellas" (ft. JD Era, Camoflauge) | Raekwon | Unexpected Victory | Be Music | |
| 2012 | "Soldier Story" (ft. JD Era) | Raekwon | Unexpected Victory | Be Music | |
| 2012 | "Gangsta Cazals" (ft. Camoflauge, JD Era, Styles P) | Raekwon | Unexpected Victory | Be Music | |
| 2013 | "Unorthodox" (ft. JD Era, Ghostface Killah, RZA, Raekwon) | Tony Touch | The Piece Maker, Vol. 3: Return of the 50 MCs | Red River | #14 Top Rap Albums |
| 2013 | "Kill Kill Kill" (ft. JD Era and Bishop Lamont) | Mad Child | Lawn Mower Man | Battle Axe | #3 Canada Chart |
