= Lord Steppington =

Studio album by Step Brothers
- Released: January 21, 2014
- Recorded: 2009–2013
- Genre: Hip-hop
- Length: 54:39
- Label: Rhymesayers
- Producers: The Alchemist; Evidence

Evidence chronology
Cats & Dogs (2011)	Lord Steppington (2014)	Weather or Not (2018)

The Alchemist chronology
The Cutting Room Floor 3 (2013)	Lord Steppington (2014)	Rapper's Best Friend 3 (2014)

Singles from Lord Steppington
- 1. "Step Masters" Released: November 19, 2013; 2. "Mums In The Garage" Released: January 16, 2014

Lord Steppington is the debut studio album by California-based hip-hop duo Step Brothers (rapper/producers The Alchemist and Evidence). The album was released on January 21, 2014 by Rhymesayers Entertainment. The record was produced entirely by Alchemist with one track produced by Evidence, and includes guest appearances from Action Bronson, Roc Marciano, Blu, Fashawn, Rakaa, Oh No, Styles P, Domo Genesis and The Whooliganz – Alchemist's old group which included actor Scott Caan.

The album was supported by the singles "Step Masters" and "Mums in the Garage" featuring Action Bronson. Upon its release, the album was met with generally positive reviews from music critics, including a 79 score based on 11 reviews at Metacritic. It debuted at number 60 on the Billboard 200 chart, with first-week sales of 5,400 copies in the United States.

== Background ==
Anticipation for the collaborative project between Dilated Peoples emcee Evidence and producer The Alchemist has been building since they have announced they would be joining forces as Step Brothers in 2009. With time passing, both artists have been preparing their joint album while balancing other projects separately. Given that they are friends since childhood, the two have worked together regularly in the past. Their collective catalog includes songs like "The Far Left", "The Red Carpet" and Dilated Peoples' "Worst Comes to Worst". But this is the first album the two will conceive together entirely. The duo announced their album title on January 1, 2013. "Lord Steppington" was chosen as the name for their record after a line Alchemist said on Gangrene's "Dark Shades."

According to Evidence, the project was completed, as of January 2013, and was set up for a release sometime in early 2013. He said that rappers Styles P, Action Bronson and Domo Genesis are confirmed to participate on the project. "The album is pretty much done and we just signed a deal [with Rhymesayers]. The deal's finished, I got my check. I was gonna tell everybody who we signed with the other day, we were going to put out a little video but we didn't get a chance because [Alchemist] and Prodigy had a show and they were rehearsing or whatever. But yeah, that's it; Step Brothers is official, the album title is set and the label is on… we've got some dope people [on the project], we've got Domo Genesis on it, we got Styles P on it so far, Action Bronson's on it. Alchemist's done all the beats on it so far, I did one… once we master it and I get the product in, then we'll give you date… but until we announce it, I'd say early 2013."

Evidence admitted that he and Alchemist didn't plan on making an album, saying "We just hung out and recorded and did wild sh-t and looked at the laptop one day and said, 'Oh, there's 20 songs.' We bottled it up and made it interesting and that's what you get."

== Release and promotion ==
On July 28, 2013, Evidence announced via Twitter that the project is slated to be released on November 19. However, it was pushed back to January 21, 2014 due to manufacturing issues.

While fans were eagerly awaiting the project's release, Rhymesayers Entertainment published a near 13-minute instrumental piece by Step Brothers entitled "Nothing To See / Hear" on September 21, 2013. This piece does not appear on the album, instead was made to promote a clothing collaboration between Evidence and Diamond Supply Co.

To promote the album, the duo released a song for free that is not included on Lord Steppington, called "Ron Carter" on October 30, 2013. The first official single entitled "Step Masters" was released on November 19, 2013 along with its Jason Goldwatch-directed music video. The album became available for pre-order on that same date, with an option for a regular version, a deluxe edition and an instrumental version. The latter was released only on vinyl, and the buyer gets the digital version with it.

== Commercial performance ==
The album debuted at number 60 on the Billboard 200 chart, with first-week sales of 5,400 copies in the United States.

== Critical response ==
Professional ratings
Aggregate scores
Source	Rating
Metacritic	79/100
Review scores
Source	Rating
AllMusic	4/5 stars
DJBooth	4/5 stars
Exclaim!	8/10
HipHopDX	4/5 stars
Pitchfork Media	7.3/10
PopMatters	3/5 stars
The Quietus	positive
RapReviews	7.5/10
XXL	(XL)

Lord Steppington was met with generally positive review from music critics. At Metacritic, assigns a normalized rating out of 100 to reviews from mainstream critics, the album received a 79 score based on 11 reviews. David Jeffries of AllMusic gave the album four stars out of five, saying "Lord Steppington is a niche album, but whenever a combination of 3rd Bass and Adult Swim is required, this one shows its pimp-hand with some dry, elevated humor." Luke Fox of Exclaim! gave the album an eight out of ten, saying "Each participant is a double-threat in his own right, but [Alchemist] handles 13 of the LP's 14 dank instrumentals, and [Evidence]'s cadence hangs right alongside guest spots from respected wordsmiths Roc Marciano, Fashawn, Blu and Styles P. Not only is Steppington the first must-own rap record of 2014, but it represents freedom for its makers."

Omar Burgess of HipHopDX gave the album four exes out of five, saying "Despite its buttoned-up title, you won't find any heavy-handed commentary on Lord Steppington. The cut and pasted nature lends itself to members of the current ADD generation and fans of Alchemist's more recent work, but the project still adheres to the principles of superior Hip Hop. Evidence plays the straight man in this double act. He seamlessly shifts between brief musings on the Rap world, his place in it and pretty much nothing at all. And when he's not threatening to chop your nipple off or singing Cyndi Lauper's 'Iko, Iko,' Alchemist comes through with the requisite mix of stout basslines, instrumental and vocal samples. It all adds up to a quality album that manages not to take itself too seriously without resorting to being dumb."

XXL reviewer Justin Block gave the album an XL rating, saying "The Step Brothers have made it clear that they can produce excellent hip-hop together, but the next step is translating that ability across an entire album in a concentrated form. For now, Lord Steppington will certainly do." Alec Siegel of DJBooth.net gave the album four spins out of five, saying "The album's content is narrow, and while there are certainly no duds here, things do get a bit predictable as the album progresses. However, the constant non-sequiturs and familiar production doesn't take a whole lot away from the overall value of the collection." Pitchfork Media's Jonah Bromwich gave the album a 7.3 out of ten, saying "Lord Steppington is just the latest remarkably solid offering from Alchemist and co. and the artists involved clearly think of the endeavors as fun and games. Of course, the fun that the artists are having is what makes albums like Lord Steppington work. Still, I'd love to see the Alchemist take a risk and hear the results when things get more serious."

=== Accolades ===
Complex named it the twenty-eighth best album of the first half of 2014. Writing for them, Angel Diaz said, "Brought to you by two of the hardest working and most consistent artists in the game, Lord Steppington is an album both fanbases can appreciate. Ev's slow flow and ALC's funny raps, over some of the toughest beats you'll hear all year, will make you nod your head while also screwing up your face like somebody farted."

== Track listing ==
- All tracks were produced by The Alchemist except "Byron G", which was produced by Evidence.

No.	Title	Writer(s)	Length
1.	"More Wins"	Alan Maman; Michael Perretta	2:31
2.	"Dr. Kimble"	A. Maman; M. Perretta	2:56
3.	"Byron G" (featuring Domo Genesis and The Whooliganz)	M. Perretta; Dominique Cole; Scott Caan	5:38
4.	"Legendary Mesh"	A. Maman; M. Perretta	3:12
5.	"No Hesitation" (featuring Styles P)	A. Maman; M. Perretta; David Styles	2:57
6.	"Swimteam Rastas"	A. Maman; M. Perretta	5:30
7.	"Mums In The Garage" (featuring Action Bronson)	A. Maman; M. Perretta; Arian Asllani	3:16
8.	"See The Rich Man Play" (featuring Roc Marciano)	A. Maman; M. Perretta; Rakeem Myer	3:18
9.	"Banging Sound" (featuring Fashawn)	A. Maman; M. Perretta; Santiago Leyva	3:19
10.	"Step Masters"	A. Maman; M. Perretta	2:58
11.	"Tomorrow" (featuring Rakaa and Blu)	A. Maman; M. Perretta; Johnson Barnes; Rakaa Taylor	3:48
12.	"Draw Something" (featuring Oh No)	A. Maman; M. Perretta; Michael Jackson	3:20
13.	"Buzzing Away"	A. Maman; M. Perretta	3:27
14.	"Just Step"	A. Maman; M. Perretta	2:23

iTunes deluxe version
No.	Title	Writer(s)	Length
15.	"String Cheese"	A. Maman; M. Perretta	2:17
16.	"Bally Shoe" (featuring Psycho Les and Fargo)	A. Maman; M. Perretta; Lester Fernandez; Fargo	3:49

== Credits ==
Credits for Lord Steppington adapted from AllMusic

- Action Bronson – featured artist
- The Alchemist – primary artist, producer, executive-executive producer (as Brother Step)
- Todd Angkasuwan – photography
- Blu – featured artist
- Brother Ali – executive producer
- Jason "J-Bird" Cook – project coordinator
- Evidence – primary artist, producer, executive-executive producer (as Brother Step)
- Fashawn – featured artist
- Domo Genesis – featured artist
- Chris Gliebe – layout, logo design
- Jon Lake – photography
- Joe LaPorta – mastering
- Neil Maman – executive producer
- Roc Marciano – featured artist
- Oh No – featured artist
- Rakaa – featured artist
- Skye Rossi – project coordinator
- Eddie Sancho – mixing
- Brent "Abu Siddiq" Sayers – executive producer
- Slug – executive producer
- Step Brothers – executive producer, primary artist
- Styles P – featured artist
- The Whooliganz – featured artist

== Chart history ==
Chart (2014)	Peak position
US Independent Albums (Billboard)	15
US Top R&B/Hip-Hop Albums (Billboard)	14
