= 360 Waves (album) =

Studio album by Durag Dynasty
- Released: March 26, 2013
- Recorded: 2012–13
- Genre: Hip-hop
- Length: 51:46
- Label: Nature Sounds
- Producer: Alchemist

Professional ratings
Review scores
Source	Rating
Exclaim!	8/10
HipHopDX	3.5/5
RapReviews	7/10
XXL	3/5

360 Waves is the only studio album by American hip-hop trio Durag Dynasty. It was released on March 26, 2013, via Nature Sounds. Production was handled entirely by The Alchemist, who also provided mixing duties. It features guest appearances from the Alchemist, Big Twins, Chace Infinite, Evidence, Imam Thug, Phil da Agony, and Prodigy.

== Background ==
The album was in the works since January 2012. Rappers Killer Ben, Planet Asia and TriState first appeared as Durag Dynasty (abbreviated as DRDC) with fellow record producer and rapper the Alchemist on the song "Junkyard Fight Scene" from the latter's album Russian Roulette, which was released on July 17, 2012. Before the release of that album, however, the Alchemist released a track with the group "Spuddnik Webb", which was supposed to be on Russian Roulette but ultimately was not featured on the album.

On February 27, 2013, the album was released for pre-order, and the official track list was premiered.

== Track listing ==
No.	Title	Writer(s)	Length
1.	"The Next One" (Intro)	Keith E. Thomas; Jason Green; Donti Ceruti; Alan Maman	0:25
2.	"Durag Dynasty Theme"	Thomas; Green; Ceruti; Maman	4:12
3.	"Tender Greens"	Thomas; Green; Ceruti; Maman	2:42
4.	"Fish Meat" (featuring Prodigy)	Thomas; Green; Ceruti; Albert Johnson; Maman	2:52
5.	"360 Waves"	Thomas; Green; Ceruti; Maman	6:56
6.	"Trailer Mix" (featuring Phil Da Agony)	Thomas; Green; Ceruti; Jason Smith; Maman	4:19
7.	"Spiral Event" (featuring Evidence)	Thomas; Green; Ceruti; Michael Perretta; Maman	3:46
8.	"Yasir Arafat Prelude"	Thomas; Green; Ceruti; Maman	1:28
9.	"Yasir Arafat"	Thomas; Green; Ceruti; Maman	3:15
10.	"Tetrahydrons on Mars" (featuring Chace Infinite)	Thomas; Green; Ceruti; Aaron Johnson; Maman	2:56
11.	"Goon Call" (featuring Iman Thug)	Thomas; Green; Ceruti; Michael Butler; Maman	4:41
12.	"Bigger U Are the Harder You Fall" (featuring Big Twinz and The Alchemist)	Thomas; Green; Ceruti; Jamal Abdul Raheem; Maman	3:10
13.	"Shooters"	Thomas; Green; Ceruti; Maman	3:46
14.	"Luxury Whip"	Thomas; Green; Ceruti; Maman	4:00
15.	"Funyons"	Thomas; Green; Ceruti; Maman	3:18
Total length:			51:46

Deluxe edition
No.	Title	Length
16.	"The Next One" (Instrumental)
17.	"DRDC Theme" (Instrumental)
18.	"Tender Greens" (Instrumental)
19.	"Fish Meat" (Instrumental)
20.	"360 Waves" (Instrumental)
21.	"Trailer Mix" (Instrumental)
22.	"Spiral Event" (Instrumental)
23.	"Yasir Arafat Prelude" (Instrumental)
24.	"Yasir Arafat" (Instrumental)
25.	"Tetrahydrons on Mars" (Instrumental)
26.	"Goon Call" (Instrumental)
27.	"Bigger U Are the Harder You Fall" (Instrumental)
28.	"Shooters" (Instrumental)
29.	"Luxury Whip" (Instrumental)
30.	"Funyons" (Instrumental)
31.	"Glass of Astonishment"
32.	"The World's Most Dangerous"

== Personnel ==
- Keith "Sharief"/"Ben Buford"/"Killa Ben" Thomas – vocals
- Jason "Planet Asia" Green – vocals
- Donti "Tri State" Ceruti – vocals
- Albert "Prodigy" Johnson – vocals (track 4)
- Jason "Phil Da Agony" Smith – vocals (track 6)
- Michael "Evidence" Perretta – vocals (track 7)
- Aaron "Chace Infinite" Johnson – vocals (track 10)
- Michael "Iman Thug" Butler – vocals (track 11)
- Jamal "Big Twins"/"Twin Gambino" Abdul Raheem – vocals (track 12)
- Alan "The Alchemist" Maman – vocals (track 12), producer, mixing
- Joe LaPorta – mastering
