= Lawn Mower Man =

Studio album by Madchild
- Released: August 6, 2013
- Recorded: 2012–13
- Genre: Hip hop
- Length: 41:55
- Label: Battle Axe Records; Suburban Noize Records
- Producer: Kevin Zinger (exec.); Madchild (exec.); C-Lance; Rob The Viking; Chin Injeti; The iKonz

Madchild chronology
Dope Sick (2012)	Lawn Mower Man (2013)	Switched On (2014)

Professional ratings
Review scores
Source	Rating
AllMusic	3/5 stars
Exclaim!	8/10

Lawn Mower Man is the second solo studio album by Canadian rapper Madchild. It was released on August 6, 2013, via Battle Axe Records and Suburban Noize Records. Production was handled by C-Lance, Rob the Viking, Chin Injeti and The iKonz, with Kevin Zinger and Madchild serving as executive producers. It features guest appearances from Sophia Danai, Bishop Lamont, JD Era, Prevail and Slaine. The album peaked at number two on the Canadian Albums Chart and at number 150 on the US Billboard 200.

== Track listing ==
No.	Title	Producer(s)	Length
1.	"Crazy"	C-Lance	2:41
2.	"Tiger Style"	C-Lance	2:52
3.	"Nature of the Beast" (featuring Sophia Danai)	Chin Injeti	2:13
4.	"Chainsaw" (featuring Slaine)	Rob the Viking	2:05
5.	"Prefontaine"	Rob the Viking	3:20
6.	"It Gets Better" (featuring Sophia Danai)	Chin Injeti	3:46
7.	"Lawn Mower Man"	Rob the Viking	2:36
8.	"Last Emperor"	C-Lance; Rob the Viking	3:35
9.	"FTW"	Rob the Viking	3:17
10.	"Good vs. Evil"	C-Lance	2:19
11.	"Coal Mine" (featuring Prevail)	Rob the Viking	3:07
12.	"Kill Kill Kill" (featuring Bishop Lamont and JD Era)	The iKonz	4:06
13.	"Blood Beast"	C-Lance	3:25
14.	"Underground King"	C-Lance	2:32
Total length:			41:55

== Personnel ==
- Shane "Madchild" Bunting – main artist, executive producer
- Sophia Danai – featured artist (tracks: 3, 6)
- George "Slaine" Carroll – featured artist (track 4)
- Kiley "Prevail" Hendriks – featured artist (track 11)
- Joseph "JD Era" Dako – featured artist (track 12)
- Philip "Bishop Lamont" Martin – featured artist (track 12)
- Robin "Rob the Viking" Hooper – producer (tracks: 4, 5, 7–9, 11), arranger, cover photo
- Craig "C-Lance" Lanciani – producer (tracks: 1, 2, 8, 10, 13, 14)
- Pranam "Chin" Injeti – producer (tracks: 3, 6)
- The Ikonz – producers (track 12)
- Kevin Zinger – executive producer, management
- Alex Rauch – design, layout
- Ivory Daniel – management
- Chris Herche – management

== Charts ==
Chart performance for Lawn Mower Man
Chart (2013)	Peak position
Canadian Albums (Billboard)	2
US Billboard 200	150
US Top R&B/Hip-Hop Albums (Billboard)	24
US Top Rap Albums (Billboard)	13
US Heatseekers Albums (Billboard)	3
US Independent Albums (Billboard)	33
