= The Weatherman LP =

Studio album by Evidence
- Released: March 20, 2007
- Recorded: 2006–07
- Studios: SoundProof East (Los Angeles, CA); Millenia Music; Chopp Shopp Studios (Durham, NC); Daddy's Room (Corona, CA); The Lab; The River Rock; The Hideaway (Minneapolis, MN)
- Genre: Underground hip-hop
- Length: 1:09:15
- Label: ABB Records
- Producers: Alchemist; DJ Babu; DJ Khalil; Evidence; Jake One; Sid Roams

Evidence chronology
The Weatherman LP (2007)	Cats & Dogs (2011)

Singles from The Weatherman LP
- 1. "Mr. Slow Flow" Released: February 2, 2007; 2. "All Said & Done" Released: October 19, 2007

Professional ratings
Review scores
Source	Rating
AllHipHop	3.5/5 stars
AllMusic	3.5/5 stars
Alternative Press	3/5
HipHopDX	4/5
PopMatters	7/10
RapReviews	9.5/10
The A.V. Club	B+
XXL	4/5 (XL)

The Weatherman LP is the debut solo album by American rapper and producer Evidence. It was released on March 20, 2007, via ABB Records. Recording sessions took place at Soundproof East in Los Angeles, at Millenia Music, at Chopp Shopp Studios in Durham, at Daddy's Room in Corona, at The Lab, at The River Rock, and at The Hideaway in Minneapolis. Production was handled by the Alchemist, Sid Roams, DJ Babu, Jake One, DJ Khalil, and Evidence himself. It features guest appearances from the Alchemist, Chace Infinite, Defari, Joe Scudda, Kamilah, Kobe, Madchild, Noelle Scaggs, Phonte, Planet Asia, Rakaa Iriscience, Rapper Big Pooh, Res, Sick Jacken and Slug.

Two singles were released from the album: "Mr. Slow Flow" and "All Said & Done". Music videos were shot for "Mr. Slow Flow" and "Chase the Clouds Away".

The album did not reach the Billboard 200 chart, however, it peaked at No. 42 on the Independent Albums and No. 18 on the Heatseekers Albums in the United States.

== Track listing ==
No.	Title	Writer(s)	Producer(s)	Length
1.	"I Know" (featuring Noelle Scaggs)	Michael Peretta; Noelle Scaggs	Evidence	3:53
2.	"Weather Report 1"			0:34
3.	"Mr. Slow Flow"	Perretta; Joey Chavez; Tavish Graham	Sid Roams	4:02
4.	"LetYourselfGo" (featuring The Alchemist and Phonte)	Perretta; Alan Maman; Phonte Coleman	The Alchemist	3:22
5.	"Down in New York City"	Perretta; Jacob Dutton; Kurt Hoffman	Jake One	4:31
6.	"A Moment in Time" (featuring Planet Asia)	Perretta; Jason Green; Chris Oroc	DJ Babu	4:47
7.	"Look for the Evidence" (Interlude)			0:26
8.	"All Said & Done" (featuring Kobe)	Perretta; Brian Honeycutt; Khalil Abdul-Rahman	DJ Khalil	4:40
9.	"Weather Report 2"			0:31
10.	"Perfect Storm" (featuring Rakaa Iriscience and Madchild)	Perretta; Rakaa Taylor; Shane Bunting; Chavez; Graham	Sid Roams	4:50
11.	"Chase the Clouds Away" (featuring Kamilah)	Perretta; Maman	The Alchemist	3:58
12.	"NC to CA" (featuring Defari, Joe Scudda and Rapper Big Pooh)	Perretta; Duane A. Johnson Jr.; Joseph Griffen; Thomas Jones	Evidence	4:32
13.	"Evidence Is Everywhere"	Perretta; Maman; Oroc	The Alchemist	2:31
14.	"Things You Do"	Perretta; Oroc	DJ Babu	3:24
15.	"Biggest Belgium Fan" (Interlude)			0:43
16.	"Hot & Cold" (featuring The Alchemist and Defari)	Perretta; Maman; Hoffman	Evidence	4:25
17.	"Line of Scrimmage" (featuring Slug)	Perretta; Sean Daley; Maman	The Alchemist	4:32
18.	"Believe in Me" (featuring Res)	Perretta; Chavez; Graham	Sid Roams	4:38
19.	"Born in L.A." (featuring Chace Infinite and Sick Jacken)	Perretta; Aaron Johnson; Joaquin Gonzalez; Maman	The Alchemist	4:35
20.	"Weather Report 3"			0:38
21.	"I Still Love You"	Perretta	Evidence	3:43
Total length:				1:09:15

Track 4, "LetYourselfGo" would feature on the soundtrack for 2008 racing game Midnight Club: Los Angeles.

== Personnel ==
- Michael "Evidence" Peretta – vocals, producer (tracks: 1, 12, 16, 21), recording (tracks: 1, 3, 4, 5, 6, 8, 10, 12, 16, 18, 19, 21), executive producer
- Noelle Scaggs – chorus vocals (track 1)
- Alan "The Alchemist" Maman – vocals (tracks: 4, 16), producer (tracks: 4, 11, 13, 17, 19), recording (tracks: 4, 11, 13, 16), executive producer
- Phonte Coleman – vocals (track 4)
- Jason "Planet Asia" Green – vocals (track 6)
- Brian "Kobe" Honeycutt – chorus vocals (track 8)
- Rakaa "Iriscience" Taylor – vocals (track 10)
- Shane "Madchild" Bunting – vocals (track 10)
- Kamilah – additional vocals (track 11)
- Duane A. "Defari" Johnson Jr. – vocals (track 12), additional chorus vocals (track 16)
- Joseph "Joe Scudda" Griffen – vocals (track 12)
- Thomas "Big Pooh" Jones III – vocals (track 12)
- Sean "Slug" Daley – vocals (track 17)
- Shareese "Res" Ballard – vocals (track 18)
- Aaron "Chace Infinite" Johnson – vocals (track 19)
- Joaquin "Sick Jacken" Gonzalez – vocals (track 19)
- Kurt "DJ Revolution" Hoffman – scratches & recording (track 1, 3, 5, 16)
- Chris "DJ Babu" Oroc – scratches (tracks: 6, 10, 11, 13, 14, 19), producer (tracks: 6, 14), recording (tracks: 6, 13, 14)
- Anton Pukshansky – bass (track 16)
- Joey Chavez – producer (tracks: 3, 10, 18)
- Tavish "Bravo" Graham – producer (tracks: 3, 10, 18)
- Jacob "Jake One" Dutton – producer (track 5)
- DJ Khalil Abdul-Rahman – producer & recording (track 8)
- Brock Korsan – recording (tracks: 3, 13, 17, 19), management
- Christopher "Khrysis" Tyson – recording (track 4)
- Robin "Rob The Viking" Hooper – recording (track 10)
- Frederico Lopez – recording (track 17)
- Joe Mabbott – recording (track 17)
- Eddie Sancho – mixing (tracks: 1–15, 17–21)
- Richard "Segal" Huredia – mixing (track 16)
- Tom Coyne – mastering
- Ben "Beni B" Nickleberry Jr. – executive producer
- Barry Underhill – photography

== Charts ==
Chart (2007)	Peak position
US Independent Albums (Billboard)	42
US Heatseekers Albums (Billboard)	18
