= Step Brothers (duo) =

American hip hop group

- Origin: Los Angeles, California, U.S.
- Genres: Hip hop
- Years active: 2008–present
- Labels: Rhymesayers; Tuff Gong
- Members: The Alchemist; Evidence

Step Brothers are an American hip hop supergroup and record production team, formed in 2008, from Los Angeles. Named after the 2008 film of the same name, the duo is composed of The Alchemist and Evidence, who produce and rap, respectively. Although the two have had multiple collaborations prior to their official formation as a duo, the group's first credited song was "So Fresh" on Evidence's 2008 EP The Layover, with their official debut album, Lord Steppington, being released in 2014.

== Discography ==
=== Studio albums ===
List of albums, with selected chart positions
Title	Album details	Peak chart positions		
Title	Album details	US	US R&B	US Rap
Lord Steppington	Released: January 21, 2014; Label: Rhymesayers Entertainment; Format: CD, LP, digital download	60	–	–
"—" denotes a title that did not chart, or was not released in that territory.

=== Singles ===
List of singles, showing year released and album name
Title	Year	Album
"Ron Carter"	2013	non-album single
"Step Masters"	2013	Lord Steppington
"Mums in the Garage" (featuring Action Bronson)	2014	Lord Steppington
"Lay Some Treats on Us"	2018	non-album singles
"Burnt Tree"	2019	non-album singles

=== Guest appearances ===
Title	Year	Other artist(s)	Album
"So Fresh"	2008	Evidence	The Layover
"Pass the Dutch"	2010	Cypress Hill	Rise Up
"Drawbar 1-2"	2010	7L & Esoteric	1212
"Egg Men"	2010	Evidence	I Don't Need Love
"It's Coming Down (Remix)"	2010	Exile	Radio AM/FM
"James Hendrix"	2011	Evidence	Cats & Dogs
"It's Magic"	2014	Diamond D	The Diam Piece
"Can't Stop, Won't Stop"	2014	Blu, TriState, Donel Smokes, Krondon, Chace Infinite, Planet Asia	Good to Be Home
"Club 33"	2017	Madchild	The Darkest Hour
