= Cats & Dogs (Evidence album) =

Studio album by Evidence
- Released: September 27, 2011
- Recorded: 2008–April 2011
- Studios: ALC Laboratories (Santa Monica, CA); Soundproof West (Venice, CA); The Drug Lab (Los Angeles, CA); Soundproof East (Los Angeles, CA); Infamous Studios (Queens, NY); Stophouse Studios (Minneapolis, MN); All This Could Be Yours (San Francisco, CA)
- Genres: Alternative hip hop; underground hip hop
- Length: 58:55
- Label: Rhymesayers
- Producers: Alchemist; Charli Brown; DJ Premier; Evidence; Rahki; Sid Roams; Twiz the Beat Pro

Evidence chronology
| The Layover EP (2008) | Cats & Dogs (2011) | Lord Steppington (2014) |

Singles from Cats & Dogs
- 1. "To Be Continued..." Released: August 17, 2010; 2. "You" Released: September 1, 2011

Cats & Dogs is the second solo studio album by American rapper and record producer Evidence. It was released on September 27, 2011, through Rhymesayers Entertainment. Recording sessions took place at ALC Laboratories in Santa Monica, Soundproof West in Venice, The Drug Lab and Soundproof East in Los Angeles, Infamous Studios in Queens, Stophouse Studios in Minneapolis and All This Could Be Yours in San Francisco. Production was handled by the Alchemist, Sid Roams, DJ Premier, Rahki, Charli Brown, Twiz the Beat Pro, and Evidence himself. It features guest appearances from Aesop Rock, Aloe Blacc, Catero, Krondon, Lil' Fame, Prodigy, Raekwon, Rakaa Iriscience, Ras Kass, Roc Marciano, Slug, Step Brothers and Termanology, with cameos from Amber Strother, Danny Keyz, Noelle Scaggs and Wendy Guerra.

The album debuted at number 64 on the Billboard 200 with 7,700 copies sold in its first week in the United States.

The album was preceded by two singles: "To Be Continued..." and "You". The first single from the album, "To Be Continued...", was not initially intended to be included on the album, but due to a positive response after its leak by DJ Premier on Sirius' HipHopNation, the song was included. Music video for "You" was directed by Todd Angkasuwan.

The album won the 2011 HHUG Album of the Year award.

== Background ==
After releasing four studio albums with Dilated Peoples from 2000 to 2006 and his debut solo studio album The Weatherman LP in 2007, Evidence has signed with Minneapolis-based independent record label Rhymesayers Entertainment in 2009. Same year he revealed that his follow-up to 2008's extended play The Layover EP, which was released via Decon, will be called Cats & Dogs and is scheduled to be released in 2010. In May 2011, Evidence stated that the album was finished and is set to be released before summer of 2011 ends. On Summer 2011, Evidence revealed the album's track list, cover art and the new release date of September 27, 2011.

The album is missing track thirteen. In his interview with DJBooth, where Evidence broke down the album track by track, the artist spoke:

"There is no track 13 on purpose. The first line of "To Be Continued" starts "10 commandments, 24 hours, the 13th floor was missing from the towers". The Masons, any buildings built by them leave the 13th floor out. 13 is not just a lucky number, but an unlucky number too. People use it both ways. For me to leave it [the 13th track] blank and then explain why in the first line of the next track, "To Be Continued" to me is genius. I don't think there's ever been a missing 13th track on an album, ever".

== Critical reception ==
Professional ratings
Aggregate scores
| Source | Rating |
|---|---|
| Metacritic | 79/100 |
Review scores
| Source | Rating |
| About.com | 4/5 stars |
| AllMusic | 4/5 stars |
| Beats Per Minute | 88/100% |
| The Boston Phoenix | 4/4 stars |
| HipHopDX | 3.5/5 |
| Now | 3/5 Ns |
| PopMatters | 8/10 |
| RapReviews | 8/10 |
| Urb | 4/5 stars |
| XXL | 3/5 |

Cats & Dogs was met with generally favorable reviews from music critics. At Metacritic, which assigns a normalized rating out of 100 to reviews from mainstream publications, the album received an average score of 79, based on ten reviews.

Chris Faraone of The Boston Phoenix gave the album 4 out of maximum 4 stars, saying: "unlike liars, fakers, and bullshit artists, he backs up his name and claim with anecdotal gems aplenty". Erik Burg of Beats Per Minute also praised the album, resuming: "it's dark but inspirational, catchy but never kitschy. Most of all though, it's honest". AllMusic's David Jeffries called it "such a well-built slab of indie rap that a four-year wait seems well worth it". Brad Washington of PopMatters wrote: "Evidence won't have the copies flying off the shelf or cause internet hysteria anytime soon, but he can deliver a thoughtful and interesting album in Cats & Dogs". Steve 'Flash' Juon of RapReviews stated: "the fans who ride for Ev won't be disappointed by Cats & Dogs. He continues to show that love for hip-hop on tracks". M.F. DiBella of Urb claimed: "despite running a bit long, this is clearly one of the year's better releases". HipHopDX editor found it "a moody, well-produced album that, at times, is brimming with meaning-something not entirely common these days".

In mixed reviews, Anupa Mistry of Now wrote: "essentially, Evidence harkens back to 00s rap nostalgia without resorting to preachy tirades or regressive concepts, a respite during a time of sing-rap and hyper-aggressive flows". Aaron Matthews of XXL wrote: "though it runs a little long, Cats & Dogs is a banging, consistent platter that ought to satisfy backpackers and hard-rocks alike".

=== Accolades ===
Accolades for Cats & Dogs
| Publication | Accolade | Rank | Ref. |
|---|---|---|---|
| HipHopDX | Top 25 Albums Of 2011 | —N/a | |

== Track listing ==
| No. | Title | Producer(s) | Length |
|---|---|---|---|
| 1. | "The Liner Notes" (featuring Aloe Blacc) | The Alchemist | 2:27 |
| 2. | "Strangers" | Twiz the Beat Pro | 4:09 |
| 3. | "The Red Carpet" (featuring Raekwon and Ras Kass) | The Alchemist | 4:45 |
| 4. | "It Wasn't Me" | Rahki | 3:26 |
| 5. | "I Don't Need Love" | Evidence | 3:00 |
| 6. | "You" | DJ Premier | 4:18 |
| 7. | "God Bless That Man" (Interlude) | | 0:49 |
| 8. | "Fame" (featuring Roc Marciano and Prodigy) | Charli Brown Beatz | 4:09 |
| 9. | "James Hendrix" (performed by Step Brothers) | The Alchemist | 3:38 |
| 10. | "Late for the Sky" (featuring Slug, Aesop Rock and Catero) | Sid Roams; Ethan Browne (add.); Evidence (add.) | 5:37 |
| 11. | "Crash" | The Alchemist | 2:42 |
| 12. | "Where You Come From?" (featuring Rakaa Iriscience, Lil' Fame and Termanology) | The Alchemist | 4:34 |
| 13. | "..." | | 0:04 |
| 14. | "To Be Continued..." | Sid Roams | 3:11 |
| 15. | "Falling Down" | Rahki | 4:15 |
| 16. | "Well Runs Dry" (featuring Krondon) | Sid Roams | 4:42 |
| 17. | "The Epilogue" | DJ Premier | 3:09 |
| Total length: | | | 58:55 |

Deluxe edition bonus tracks
| No. | Title | Producer(s) | Length |
|---|---|---|---|
| 18. | "Sleep Deprivation" | The Alchemist | 3:25 |
| 19. | "Good Times" | Statik Selektah | 4:02 |

Note

- Track 13 is unlisted on physical copies of the album and is unlisted on various digital editions.

== Personnel ==
- Michael "Evidence" Peretta – vocals, producer (track 5), additional producer (track 10), recording (tracks: 4, 8, 9, 12, 16), executive producer
- Egbert Nathaniel "Aloe Blacc" Dawkins – vocals (track 1)
- Corey "Raekwon" Woods – vocals (track 3)
- John "Ras Kass" Austin – vocals (track 3)
- Daniel "Danny Keyz" Tannenbaum – additional vocals & keyboards (track 4)
- Noelle Scaggs – additional vocals (track 5)
- Wendy Guerra – additional vocals (track 6)
- Rahkeim Calief "Roc Marciano" Meyer – vocals & recording (track 8)
- Albert "Prodigy" Johnson – vocals (track 8)
- Amber Strother – additional vocals (tracks: 8, 15)
- Alan "The Alchemist" Maman – vocals (track 9), producer & recording (tracks: 1, 3, 9, 11, 12), executive producer
- Sean "Slug" Daley – vocals (track 10), executive producer
- Ian Matthias "Aesop Rock" Bavitz – vocals & recording (track 10)
- Catero Colbert – additional vocals (track 10)
- Rakaa "Iriscience" Taylor – vocals (track 12)
- Jamal "Lil' Fame" Grinnage – vocals (track 12)
- Daniel "Termanology" Carrillo – vocals (track 12)
- Marvin "Krondon" Jones – vocals (track 16)
- Kurt "DJ Revolution" Hoffman – scratches (tracks: 2, 3, 14, 15)
- Christopher "Khrysis" Tyson – organ & bass (track 5)
- Christopher "DJ Babu" Oroc – scratches (tracks: 5, 10)
- Christopher "DJ Premier" Martin – scratches & producer (tracks: 6, 17), mixing (track 6)
- DJ Flash of Justus League – scratches (track 12)
- Timothy "Twiz The Beat Pro" McRae – producer (track 2), recording (tracks: 2, 6, 10, 17)
- Columbus "Rahki" Smith – producer (tracks: 4, 15), recording (track 4)
- Charlie Mauricio "Charli Brown Beatz" Barrionuevo Jr. – producer (track 8)
- Joey Chavez – producer (tracks: 10, 14, 16)
- Tavish "Bravo" Graham – producer (tracks: 10, 14, 16), executive producer
- Ethan Browne – additional producer (track 10)
- Frederico Lopez – recording (tracks: 3, 5, 16)
- James "LMNO" Kelly – recording (track 6)
- Dillon Parker – recording (track 10)
- Brock Korsan – recording (tracks: 14, 15), A&R
- Eddie Sancho – mixing (tracks: 1–5, 7–17)
- Ricardo Gutierrez – mastering
- Brent Sayers – executive producer
- Jason Cook – project coordinator
- Skye Rossi – project coordinator
- Navarro Ristagno – art direction, layout
- Brian "B+" Cross – photography
- Benny Glickman – management
- Kevin Zinger – management

== Charts ==
| Chart (2011) | Peak position |
|---|---|
| Swiss Albums (Schweizer Hitparade) | 69 |
| US Billboard 200 | 64 |
| US Top R&B/Hip-Hop Albums (Billboard) | 10 |
| US Top Rap Albums (Billboard) | 8 |
| US Independent Albums (Billboard) | 9 |
| US Indie Store Album Sales (Billboard) | 17 |
| US Vinyl Albums (Billboard) | 7 |
