= Madchild =

Canadian rapper

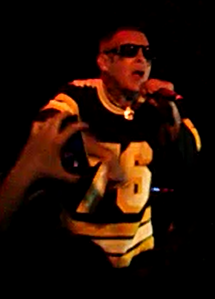
- Madchild at Le Belmont, Montreal, Canada

Background information
- Born: Shane Bunting; October 21, 1975 (age 51); Surrey, British Columbia, Canada
- Origin: Vancouver, British Columbia, Canada
- Genres: Hip-hop; hardcore rap; horrorcore
- Occupations: Rapper; songwriter; record executive
- Years active: 1993–present
- Labels: One Man Gang; Suburban Noize; Battle Axe Records (founder)
- Member of: Swollen Members
- Formerly of: Perfect Strangers; What The Hell

Shane Bunting (born October 21, 1975), better known by his stage name Madchild, is a Canadian rapper. He is the founder of the Vancouver-based record label Battle Axe Records, and hip-hop group Swollen Members with Prevail.

== Personal life ==
Bunting was born in Surrey, British Columbia, but was raised in North Vancouver. He attended Carson Graham and Sutherland secondary schools. He moved to San Francisco when he was 20 years old and returned to British Columbia in the mid-1990s. Since 2014, he has resided in West Hollywood, California.

== Career ==
In 1993, he was named a member of the Rock Steady Crew. Also in 1993, he released the album What the Hell with Flipout. In 1996, he founded the record label Battle Axe Records, and the hip-hop group Swollen Members with Prevail. The group has released eight studio albums, three compilation albums, two greatest hits albums, and one live album. They are the best-selling Canadian hip-hop group in Canada of all time and won the Juno Award four times.

In 2009, he released a solo EP titled The Madchild EP. In August 2011, he took part in a rap battle for King of the Dot, an Ontario–based battle league. He went up against Dirtbag Dan and won on a three to two decision. He was scheduled to return to King of the Dot in August 2012 to battle with the Australian rapper 360, however, the battle was postponed, as 360 was scheduled to receive ocular surgery at the time of the event. In 2012, he released his first solo album, titled Dope Sick followed by Lawn Mower Man in 2013, Switched On EP in 2014 and Silver Tongue Devil in 2015. In April of 2015, Madchild competed against rapper Daylyt in KOTD's Blackout5. The Darkest Hour, produced by Evidence, was released in 2017. In 2020, he released the album Killing the Neighbors with Tom MacDonald.

== Controversies ==
=== Drug use ===
Bunting was addicted to the painkillers Oxycodone and Percocet and heavily abused alcohol from 2006 to 2009. He has often spoken about its negative impact on his life and career.

=== Hells Angels ===
In 2006, he lost his distribution deal with Nettwerk due to his affiliation with the Hells Angels. In early 2011, it was reported that Bunting was banned from entering the United States, due to his affiliation with the Hells Angels. Bunting said he was detained at an American airport for approximately eight hours before being told he could not enter the country. He worked with a lawyer in San Diego, California, to rectify the situation. In July 2013, it was announced that Bunting was once again allowed to enter the United States.

=== Battle Axe Warriors lawsuit ===
In October of 2015, Madchild, Kyle Kraft, Rocco Dipopolo and Suburban Noize Records founder Kevin Zinger were sued by David Waltho. In 2010 Madchild created the "Battle Axe Warriors" fan club, which Waltho placed an initial investment of $5,000. He also loaned Madchild $6,500 for a Harley-Davidson motorcycle, $8,500 for a 1969 Ford Mustang and $5,000 for "food, gas, cigarettes, housing and artwork." In addition to not paying back the debts, Madchild allegedly ran the operation with alternate partners not included in the initial agreement, Kyle Kraft, Rocco Dipopolo and Kevin Zinger.

=== Snak the Ripper feud, Matt Brevner and Tre Nyce disses ===
Also in October of 2015, following a deleted social media post by Madchild, Snak the Ripper released a series of diss tracks aimed at him known as The Sadchild Trilogy, which included "Assisted Suicide", "Child Abuse" and "Triple Homicide". Madchild responded with the tracks "The Funeral" and "Fatal Attraction".

On November 2, 2015, Matt Brevner released a Madchild diss track titled "Waterloo (The Jitters Story)", followed on November 5 by "#Sadchild" by Tre Nyce. Madchild said "I'm not going to waste any time talking about Matt Brevner or Tre Nyce, because it just doesn’t warrant a response."

On November 13, American internet personality Zack Fox (formerly known as Bootymath) reviewed each diss track. He stated "This beef is dryer than printer paper. I could replace elevator music with this and nobody would notice."

== Discography ==
=== Studio albums ===
List of studio albums, with selected chart positions and certifications
Title	Album details	Peak chart positions			
Title	Album details	CAN	US	US R&B	US Rap
What The Hell (with Flipout)	Released: July 27, 1993; Label: Tandem Records; Format: CD, cassette, digital download, streaming	–	–	–	–
Dope Sick	Released: August 28, 2012; Label: Battle Axe Records, Suburban Noize; Format: CD, LP, digital download, streaming	3	–	29	23
Lawn Mower Man	Released: August 6, 2013; Label: Battle Axe Records, Suburban Noize; Format: CD, LP, digital download, streaming	2	150	24	13
Silver Tongue Devil	Released: July 24, 2015; Label: Battle Axe Records; Format: CD, LP, digital download, streaming	3	–	19	16
The Darkest Hour (produced by Evidence)	Released: July 28, 2017; Label: Battle Axe Records; Format: CD, LP, digital download, streaming	57	–	–	–
Demons	Released: April 12, 2019; Label: Battle Axe Records; Format: CD, LP, digital download, streaming	–	–	–	–
Killing the Neighbors (with Tom MacDonald)	Released: February 15, 2020; Label: Self-released; Format: CD	–	–	–	–
Little Monster LP	Released: December 10, 2020; Label: One Man Gang; Format: CD, digital download	–	–	–	–
Shane	Released: July 23, 2021; Label: One Man Gang; Format: CD, digital download	–	–	–	–
Shane 2	Released: November 12, 2021; Label: One Man Gang; Format: CD, digital download	–	–	–	–
Super Beast	Released: May 20, 2022; Label: One Man Gang; Format: CD, digital download	–	–	–	–
Mobsters & Monsters (with Obnoxious)	Released: December 2, 2022; Label: Regime Music Group; Format: CD, digital download	–	–	–	–

=== Extended plays ===
List of extended plays, with selected chart positions and certifications
Title	Album details	Peak chart positions		
Title	Album details	CAN	US R&B	US Rap
Claustrophobic	Released: 1995; Label: Self-Released	–	–	–
Perfect Strangers (with Moka Only)	Released: 2001; Label: Battle Axe Records	–	–	–
The Mad Child	Released: July 1, 2009; Label: Battle Axe Records, Suburban Noize	–	–	–
Banned from America	Released: February 15, 2011; Label: Battle Axe Records, Suburban Noize	–	–	–
King of Pain	Released: August 2, 2011; Label: Battle Axe Records, Suburban Noize	–	–	–
Little Monster	Released: January 24, 2012; Label: Battle Axe Records, Suburban Noize	–	–	–
Switched On	Released: September 30, 2014; Label: Battle Axe Records, Suburban Noize	8	32	18

=== Mixtapes ===
- M.A.D.E.: Misguided Angel Destroys Everything (produced by Madlib) (2011)
- Underground Monsters (2016)
- Madchild Mondays (2017)
- Mad World (2023)

=== Guest appearances ===
List of non-single guest appearances, with other performing artists, showing year released and album name
Title	Year	Other artist(s)	Album
“Different”	2000	Living Legends, Moka Only	Angels Wit Dirty Faces
“Formula Fresh”	2001	Moka Only	Lime Green
“To Make Millions”	2001	Code Name: Scorpion	Code Name: Scorpion
“Once Again”	2005	Moka Only	The Desired Effect
“Sitting On The Porch”	2005	Moka Only	The Desired Effect
"Ballistic"	2013	Swisha T	—N/a
"Look Up (Signs)"	2013	Classified, Kardinal Offishall	Classified
"Bobby Be Real"	2014	Slaine, Tech N9ne	The King of Everything Else
"Live This"	2014	SonReal	—N/a
"Life is a Struggle"	2014	Mike ADHD, Kromeatose	The Evil Within
"Transform"	2014	Bloodstepp	Grand Theft Ufo: Floppy Disk Edition
"Darkside"	2013	Oxxxymiron (Porchy, Jaime Menezes)	—N/a
"The Plague"	2015	Prozak, Ubiquitous	Black Ink
"We're Gonna Fuck You Up"	2016	Reznik, Snowgoons	Říše Za Zrcadlem
"Zombie"	2016	Lil Wyte, Jelly Roll, Insane Clown Posse	No Filter 2
"Bury Them Deep"	2016	The Reaper Project, Rock	6 Feet Deep
"Run"	2017	Bukshot, Jelly Roll, Violent J	Weirdo
"Freak Show" (Remix)	2017	Bukshot, Twiztid	Weirdo
"Bad News"	2020	Tom Macdonald, Nova Rockefeller	Killing The Neighbors
"White Trash"	2020	Tom Macdonald	Killing The Neighbors
"Fire Emojis"	2022	Tom Macdonald, Adam Calhoun	The Brave

=== Music videos ===
Year	Song	Director(s)	Album
2011	"Hangin' On by a Thread"	mr.Invisible	M.A.D.E. (mixtape)
2011	"Dead Man Walking Vol. 1"	mr.Invisible	M.A.D.E. (mixtape)
2011	"Dead Man Walking Vol. 2"	mr.Invisible	M.A.D.E. (mixtape)
2011	"Fuck Madchild"	Phillip Carrer & Chad Archibald	Little Monster EP
2012	"Shit Talker"	D-Shot	Little Monster EP
2012	"Dungeon Dragon"	D-Shot	King of Pain EP
2012	"Wanted"	D-Shot	Dope Sick
2012	"Gremlin"	Gabriel Carrer	King of Pain EP
2012	"Mr. Peter Parker Freestyle"	D-Shot	Unreleased
2012	"Out of My Head"	Aspect	Dope Sick
2012	"Devil`s Reject"	David McDonald	Dope Sick
2012	"Monster"	David McDonald	Dope Sick
2012	"Jitters"	David McDonald	Dope Sick
2012	"Runaway"	Justin Donnelly	Dope Sick
2012	"Broken Mirror"	Patrick Lozinski	The Mad Child EP
2012	"Cyphin"	D-Shot	Little Monster EP
2013	"Last Emperor"	D-Shot	Lawn Mower Man
2013	"Prefontaine"	D-Shot	Lawn Mower Man
2013	"Grenade Launcher" (feat. Slaine & Prevail )	D-Shot	Dope Sick
2013	"Tiger Style"	D-Shot	Lawn Mower Man
2013	"Nature of the Beast"	D-Shot	Lawn Mower Man
2013	"Underground King"	D-Shot	Lawn Mower Man
2013	"It Gets Better"	Jon Thomas	Lawn Mower Man
2013	"Crazy"	David McDonald	Lawn Mower Man
2013	"Lawn Mower Man"	D-Shot	Lawn Mower Man
2013	"Blood Beast"	D-Shot	Lawn Mower Man
2013	"Chainsaw" (feat. Slaine)	Slaine & D-Shot	Lawn Mower Man
2014	"The Adventures of Super Beast"	D-Shot	Underground Monsters (mixtape)
2014	"Switched On"	Ryan Lindow	Switched On EP
2014	"White Knuckles"	Ryan Lindow	Switched On EP
2014	"Never Die"	Ryan Lindow	Switched On EP
2014	"Amadeus"	Ryan Lindow	Switched On EP
2014	"Tom Cruise"	Luke Soanes	Switched On EP
2014	"The Jackel"	SGZ	Silver Tongue Devil
2014	"Blitzkrieg"	Ryan Lindow	Switched On EP
2014	"On One"	videostudio	Switched On EP
2015	"Mental" (feat. Demrick)	Jakob Owens	Silver Tongue Devil
2015	"Slayer" (feat. Demrick)	Jakob Owens	Silver Tongue Devil
2015	"Devils & Angels"	Drew Kirsch	Silver Tongue Devil
2015	"Lose My Mind"	Jesse Ray Diamond	Silver Tongue Devil
2015	"Everytime" (feat Ceekay Jones)	Matt Alonzo	Silver Tongue Devil
2015	"Night Time Kill"	Dustin La Rose	Silver Tongue Devil
2015	"Brain Dead"	Dustin La Rose	Silver Tongue Devil
2015	"Painful Skies"	Dustin La Rose	Silver Tongue Devil
2016	"Man Down" (feat. Demrick)	D-Shot	-
2016	"Little Things" (feat. Joseph Rose)	Thoughtbox Visuals	Underground Monsters (mixtape)
2016	"50 Seven"	Big Shot Music Inc.	Silver Tongue Devil
2016	"Write It Down"	The Jokerr	The Darkest Hour
2017	"Badchild"	Punit Dhesi	The Darkest Hour
2017	"Broken Record"	Punit Dhesi	The Darkest Hour
2017	"Black & White"	Punit Dhesi	The Darkest Hour
2017	"Drama"	Revolt Art Technology	The Darkest Hour
2019	"Demons"	Anthony La Rose	Demons
2019	"Death Race"	Luke Connor	Demons
2019	"Times Change"	Anthony La Rose	Demons
2019	"Dreaded Force"	Luke Connor	Demons
2019	"Han Solo"	Anthony La Rose	Demons
2019	"Watergate"	Luke Connor	Demons
2019	"Terror"	Luke Connor	Demons
2019	"Soiled in Regret"	Anthony La Rose	Demons
2019	"Myself"	Luke Connor	Demons
2019	"Brainstorm"	Luke Connor	Demons
2019	"Di*khead"	UGH	Dope Sick
2020	"Lemons"	Laura Kulik	Mad World
2020	"Run It Up"	Laura Kulik	The Little Monster
2020	"I Was on Drugs"	Laura Kulik	The Little Monster
2021	"Love Me, or Hate Me" (feat. Peter Jackson)	Devan Locke	The Little Monster (deluxe)
2021	"Onlyfanz"	Joey Oz	Shane 2
2021	"Overdose"	Joey Oz	Shane 2
2021	"MVP"	Joey Oz	Shane
2021	"Kampai"	Joey Oz	Shane 2
2021	"Rock Bottom"	Joey Oz	Shane 2
2021	"Abattoir"	Joey Oz	-
2021	"Leave A Light" (feat. Joey Oz)	Joey Oz	-
2021	"Alone"	Joey Oz	Shane
2021	"Trapped" (feat. Kaysie Marie)	Joey Oz	-

== Awards ==
*All awards won with Swollen Members*

=== Juno Awards ===
- 2001 - Best Rap Recording (Balance)
- 2002 - Best Rap Recording (Bad Dreams)
- 2003 - Rap Recording of the Year (Monsters in the Closet)
- 2007 - Rap Recording of the Year (Black Magic)

=== MuchMusic Video Awards ===
- 2001 - Best Independent Video - “Lady Venom”
- 2002 - Best Rap Video - "Fuel Injected" (ft. Moka Only)
- 2002 - Best Director - "Fuel Injected" (ft. Moka Only)
- 2002 - VideoFACT Award - "Fuel Injected" (ft. Moka Only)
- 2002 - Best Independent Video - "Fuel Injected" (ft. Moka Only)
- 2002 - Peoples Choice: Favorite Canadian Group
- 2003 - Best Rap Video - "Breathe" (ft. Nelly Furtado)

=== Western Canadian Music Awards ===
- 2003 - Outstanding Rap/Hip-Hop Recording (Monsters in the Closet)
- 2003 - Video of the Year - “Breathe” (ft. Nelly Furtado)
- 2004 - Outstanding Rap/Hip-Hop Recording (Heavy)
