= Evidence (musician) =

American rapper and record producer from California

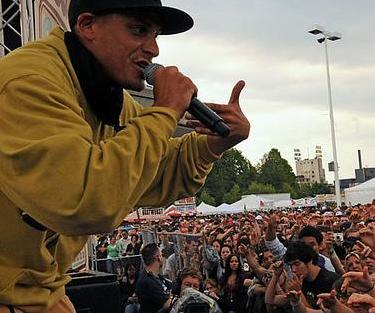
- Evidence in 2006

Background information
- Also known as: EV; Mr. Slow Flow; the Weatherman
- Born: Michael Taylor Perretta; December 10, 1976 (age 49); Los Angeles, California, U.S.
- Genre: Hip-hop
- Occupations: Rapper; record producer; songwriter
- Works: Evidence discography
- Years active: 1988–present
- Labels: Capitol; ABB; Decon; Rhymesayers; Battle Axe
- Member of: Dilated Peoples; Step Brothers
- Website: Official website

Michael Taylor Perretta (born December 10, 1976), known professionally as Evidence, is an American rapper and record producer from Venice, Los Angeles, California. He is also a member of the group Dilated Peoples, as well as being one-half of Step Brothers with the Alchemist. Evidence was included in the nomination for a Grammy Award for Album of the Year because of his production work on the Kanye West debut album The College Dropout.

== Early life ==
Evidence was born Michael Perretta on December 10, 1976, in Venice, Los Angeles, California, to Louis Michael Perretta, an Italian American, and actress Jana Taylor, who appeared in American television shows in the 1960s and 1970s. Growing up he lived next to the studio of Quincy Jones III. He learned music production there.

== Career ==
=== Dilated Peoples ===
With Rakaa and DJ Babu he formed Dilated Peoples, releasing their first single "Third Degree" in 1997 via ABB Records and their debut studio album The Platform in 2000.

=== Solo work ===
On March 20, 2007, Evidence released his first solo album The Weatherman LP. It held production contributions from the Alchemist, Sid Roams (producers Joey Chavez and Tavish "Bravo" Graham), Jake One, DJ Babu, DJ Khalil, and Evidence himself.

On July 17, 2009, it was announced that Evidence had signed a deal with Minneapolis-based hip-hop label Rhymesayers Entertainment, with a YouTube video showing Evidence signing the contract to release his next album.

Evidence's second studio album, Cats & Dogs, was released on September 27, 2011. The album charted at number 64 on the Billboard 200. The album won 2011 HHUG Best Album of the Year.

Evidence's third solo album, Weather or Not, was released on January 26, 2018. It debuted at number 187 on the Billboard 200. It covers his personal life in great detail, including the birth of his first son and his partner's battle with breast cancer.

In 2021, Evidence released his fourth studio album Unlearning Vol. 1.

== Discography ==
- The Weatherman LP (2007)
- Cats & Dogs (2011)
- Lord Steppington (with the Alchemist) (2014)
- Weather or Not (2018)
- Unlearning Vol. 1 (2021)
- Unlearning Vol. 2 (2025)

== Awards and nominations ==
| Year | Nominee / work | Award | Result | Ref. |
|---|---|---|---|---|
| 2005 | The College Dropout | Grammy Award for Album of the Year | Nominated | |
