= 20/20 (Dilated Peoples album) =

Studio album by Dilated Peoples
- Released: February 21, 2006
- Recorded: 2005
- Studio: Soundproof East (Los Angeles, CA); Al Gibbs Mobile Studio, Capelton's Room; Ameraycan Studios (Burbank, CA); Daddy's Room (Corona, CA)
- Genre: Hip hop
- Length: 55:19
- Label: ABB; Capitol
- Producer: Alchemist; DJ Babu; Evidence; Porse; Sid Roams

Dilated Peoples chronology
Neighborhood Watch (2004)	20/20 (2006)	Directors of Photography (2014)

Singles from 20/20
- 1. "Back Again" Released: 2005; 2. "You Can't Hide, You Can't Run" Released: 2006

20/20 is the fourth studio album by American hip hop trio Dilated Peoples. It was released on February 21, 2006, through ABB/Capitol Records. The recording sessions took place at Soundproof East in Los Angeles, at Al Gibbs Mobile Studio, Capelton's Room, at Ameraycan Studios in Burbank, and at Daddy's Room in Corona. The album was produced by members Evidence and DJ Babu, as well as Alchemist, Sid Roams, and Porse. It features guest appearances from Capleton, Defari, Krondon, and Talib Kweli. The album debuted at number 97 on the Billboard 200 and number 35 on the Top R&B/Hip-Hop Albums in the United States. It also made it to number 56 on the Swiss Hitparade.

The album was preceded by two singles: "Back Again" and "You Can't Hide, You Can't Run". Its lead single, "Back Again", peaked at No. 98 on the UK Singles Chart.

== Critical reception ==
Professional ratings
Aggregate scores
Source	Rating
Metacritic	63/100
Review scores
Source	Rating
AllMusic	3/5 stars
The A.V. Club	C+
The Guardian	2/5 stars
HipHopDX	3.5/5
Now	4/5 Ns
PopMatters	7/10
RapReviews	8/10
Rolling Stone	3/5 stars
The Skinny	4/5 stars
Spin	B

20/20 was met with generally favorable reviews from music critics. At Metacritic, which assigns a normalized rating out of 100 to reviews from mainstream publications, the album received an average score of 63, based on fourteen reviews.

NOW magazine reviewer praised the album calling it "rife with brow-raising darts and the mindblowing beats to match, outstripping the last two Dilated records and threatening the alignment of your neck vertebrae in the process". Steve 'Flash' Juon of RapReviews stated that "that will serve their core audience well". Spin critic marked "DJ Babu's soulful, pyrotechnic turntablism straddles the indie-mainstream divide". Michael Frauenhofer of PopMatters found the album "essentially front-loaded, packing its most powerful punch in the first few tracks and then simmering to a lower level of heat".

In mixed reviews, AllMusic's David Jeffries wrote: "while 20/20 might be a shade too unambitious for casual listeners expecting another Expansion Team, DP heads looking to kick back and listen get plenty of pure underground to devour". Peter Relic of Rolling Stone found it "less a great album than a group of scattershot bangers". Nathan Rabin of The A.V. Club wrote: "Dilated Peoples' orthodox appeal has always been its aversion to gimmicks and flash, but on this underwhelming album the venerable trio offer little in the way of humor or excitement, either".

In a negative review, David Peschek of The Guardian wrote: "what 20/20 does best is portentousness and the empty brag - essentially male traits that make listening rather like being hectored by the pub bore".

== Track listing ==
No.	Title	Writer(s)	Producer(s)	Length
1.	"Green Trees" (featuring Dr. Greenthumb)		Evidence	0:40
2.	"Back Again"	Michael Perretta; Rakaa Taylor; Chris Oroc; Alan Maman	Alchemist	4:00
3.	"You Can't Hide, You Can't Run"	Perretta; Taylor; Oroc; Charles McCloud	Evidence	4:17
4.	"Alarm Clock Music"	Perretta; Taylor; Oroc; Brian Protheroe	DJ Babu	5:20
5.	"Olde English" (featuring Defari)	Perretta; Taylor; Oroc; Duane A. Johnson Jr.; Joey Chavez; Tavish Graham	Sid Roams	4:13
6.	"Kindness for Weakness" (featuring Talib Kweli)	Perretta; Taylor; Oroc; Talib Kweli Greene; James Banks; Eddie Marion; Henderson Thigpen; William Toles	Evidence	4:07
7.	"Another Sound Mission"	Perretta; Taylor; Oroc; Chavez; Graham	Sid Roams	3:16
8.	"Rapid Transit" (featuring Krondon)	Perretta; Taylor; Oroc; Marvin Jones	Evidence	6:19
9.	"The Eyes Have It"	Perretta; Taylor; Oroc	DJ Babu	4:18
10.	"Satellite Radio"	Perretta; Taylor; Oroc	Evidence	4:15
11.	"Firepower (The Tables Have to Turn)" (featuring Capleton)	Perretta; Taylor; Oroc; Clifton Bailey; David Straume	Evidence; Porse; DJ Babu	5:09
12.	"The One and Only"	Perretta; Taylor; Oroc	DJ Babu	4:43
13.	"20/20"	Perretta; Taylor; Oroc; Maman	Alchemist	4:42
Total length:				55:19

Japan Bonus Track
No.	Title	Producer(s)	Length
14.	"Alarm Clock Music" (Remix)	DJ Babu	3:57

Sample credits

- Track 3 contains a sample from "Send Me" written by Charles McCloud and performed by Roslyn and Charles.
- Track 4 contains a sample from "Goodbye Surprise" written and performed by Brian Protheroe.
- Track 6 contains a sample from "Don't Take My Kindness for Weakness" written by James Banks, Eddie Marion, Henderson Thigpen and William Toles and performed by the Soul Children.

== Personnel ==
- Michael "Evidence" Peretta – vocals, producer (tracks: 1, 3, 6, 8, 10, 11), recording (tracks: 1–6, 8–11, 13), mixing (track 1), executive producer
- Rakaa "Iriscience" Taylor – vocals, recording (tracks: 1–6, 8–11, 13), mixing (track 1), executive producer
- Chris "DJ Babu" Oroc – scratches, producer (tracks: 4, 9, 11, 12), recording (tracks: 1–6, 8–13), mixing (track 1), executive producer
- Dodee Westbeach – vocals (track 1)
- Kenny Morrison – vocals (track 1)
- Simon "Dirt Nasty" Rex – additional vocals (track 1)
- Duane A. "Defari" Johnson Jr. – vocals (track 5)
- Talib Kweli – vocals (track 6)
- Marvin "Krondon" Jones – vocals (track 8)
- Jason "Phil Da Agony" Smith – additional vocals (track 8)
- Noelle Scaggs – additional vocals (track 8)
- Clifton "Capleton" Bailey – vocals (track 11)
- Jeff Babko – keyboards (tracks: 3, 8, 12), bass (track 8)
- Alan "The Alchemist" Maman – producer (tracks: 2, 13)
- Joey Chavez – producer (tracks: 5, 7)
- Tavish "Bravo" Graham – producer (tracks: 5, 7)
- David "Porse" Straume – producer (track 11)
- Richard "Segal" Huredia – mixing (track: 2, 3, 5–7, 9, 13)
- Troy Staton – mixing (tracks: 4, 10–12), recording (track 11)
- Manny Marroquin – mixing (track 8)
- Michael "Mixing Finga" Stewart – recording (track 11)
- Scott Elgin – engineering assistant (tracks: 5–7, 9)
- Jared Robbins – engineering assistant (track 8)
- Ian Suddarth – engineering assistant (track 10)
- Rob Montes – engineering assistant (track 11)
- Brian "Big Bass" Gardner – mastering
- Ben "Beni B" Nickleberry Jr. – executive producer
- Brent Rollins – art direction
- Nabil Elderkin – photography

== Charts ==
Chart (2006)	Peak position
Swiss Albums (Schweizer Hitparade)	56
UK R&B Albums (OCC)	10
US Billboard 200	97
US Top R&B/Hip-Hop Albums (Billboard)	35
