= Crown of Thorns (album) =

Studio album by Rakaa
- Released: July 20, 2010
- Genre: Hip-hop
- Length: 58:27
- Label: Decon
- Producer: Sid Roams; King Jahzzy; Evidence; Exile; DJ Babu; Oh No; DJ Honda; Illmind; Eric Bobo; DJ Rhettmatic; The Alchemist; El-P; Jamyung "Jay" Taylor (exec.)

Rakaa chronology
Crown of Thorns (2010)	The Delilah EP (2010)

Crown of Thorns is the debut solo studio album by American rapper Rakaa, a member of the Dilated Peoples crew. It was released on Decon in 2010. The cover art was painted by Doze Green. The album peaked at number 72 on the Billboard Top R&B/Hip-Hop Albums chart.

== Critical reception ==
Professional ratings
Review scores
Source	Rating
Alarm	favorable
HipHopDX	4/5 stars
The Phoenix	3.5/4 stars
Potholes in My Blog	4/5 stars
URB	3/5 stars

Chris Faraone of The Phoenix gave the album 3.5 stars out of 4, writing, "A couple of dud throwbacks briefly interrupt, but otherwise Rakaa has painted the sort of edgeless canvas that even the most eclectic acts are scared to make these days." Scott Morrow of Alarm described the album as "a straightforward, original disc of hip-hop jams with a diversity of samples and sounds, whether they're hard-hitting, funky, or jazzy." Brett Uddenberg of URB gave the album 3 stars out of 5, stating, "While the solo record is an extension of what he has accomplished with his group, it is unlikely to spawn any memorable hits." He added, "The beats are excellent and the flow is solid, but there's something missing here."

HipHopDX included it on the "Top 25 Albums of 2010" list.

== Track listing ==
No.	Title	Producer(s)	Length
1.	"Crown of Thorns" (featuring Aloe Blacc)	Sid Roams	4:23
2.	"The Observatory" (featuring Mad Lion)	King Jahzzy	5:31
3.	"Delilah"	Evidence	4:50
4.	"Human Nature (Now Breathe)" (featuring KRS-One)	Exile	4:08
5.	"C.T.D."	DJ Babu	3:35
6.	"Assault and Battery"	Oh No	3:45
7.	"Ambassador Slang" (featuring Tasha, Tiger JK, Roscoe Umali, Bigryzn, Moshpit, Dumbfoundead, Tassho Pearce, Tablo, Mithra Jin, Jay Jaballas, and King Kapisi)	DJ Honda	4:36
8.	"Eyes Wide" (featuring Krondon)	DJ Babu	4:16
9.	"Mezcal"	Illmind	5:11
10.	"Rosetta Stone Grove (Universal Language)" (featuring Noelle Scaggs)	Eric Bobo; DJ Rhettmatic	4:08
11.	"Aces High" (featuring Evidence, Fashawn, and Defari)	The Alchemist	4:53
12.	"Mean Streak" (featuring Chali 2na)	El-P	4:37
13.	"Upstairs"	The Alchemist	4:34
Total length:			58:27

== Charts ==
Chart	Peak position
US Top R&B/Hip-Hop Albums (Billboard)	72
