= The L.J.'s =

Studio album by Likwit Junkies (Defari and DJ Babu)
- Released: March 22, 2005
- Studio: Daddy's Room (Corona, CA)
- Genre: Hip-hop
- Length: 1:09:55
- Label: ABB Records
- Producer: DJ Babu

Defari chronology
Odds & Evens (2003)	The L.J.'s (2005)	Street Music (2006)

Singles from The L.J.'s
- 1. "Keep Doin' It / S.C.A.N.S." Released: December 16, 2003; 2. "The Hop / Dark Ends" Released: 2004; 3. "One Day Away / Strength In Numbers" Released: March 8, 2005; 4. "Ghetto / Brother" Released: 2005

Professional ratings
Review scores
Source	Rating
AllMusic	2.5/5 stars
IGN	7/10
Laut.de	4/5 stars
PopMatters	6/10
RapReviews	9/10
Tiny Mix Tapes	2/5 marks

The L.J.'s is the debut studio album by American Los Angeles-based hip-hop duo the Likwit Junkies, composed of rapper Defari of the Likwit Crew and DJ/record producer DJ Babu of Beat Junkies and Dilated Peoples. It was released in March 2005 through ABB Records. Recording sessions took place at Daddy's Room in Corona, California. Production was handled by DJ Babu, with Defari co-produced two of its 18 tracks. It features guest appearances from Dodee Westbeach, Noelle Scaggs, Evidence, Krondon, Phil Da Agony, Planet Asia and Rakaa Iriscience. The album was supported by four singles: "Keep Doin It" b/w "S.C.A.N.S.", "The Hop" b/w "Dark Ends", "One Day Away" b/w "Strength in Numbers" and "Ghetto" b/w "Brother". The album was met with generally favorable reviews from music critics.

== Track listing ==
No.	Title	Writer(s)	Producer(s)	Length
1.	"Intro"	Duane A. Johnson Jr.; Chris Oroc	DJ Babu	0:29
2.	"L.J.'s Anthem" (featuring Noelle Scaggs)	Johnson Jr.; Oroc	DJ Babu	3:58
3.	"One Day Away"	Johnson Jr.; Oroc	DJ Babu	3:46
4.	"The Hop"	Johnson Jr.; Oroc	DJ Babu	4:04
5.	"Salute"	Johnson Jr.; Oroc	DJ Babu	3:37
6.	"Change"	Johnson Jr.; Oroc	DJ Babu	4:20
7.	"Strength in Numbers" (featuring Phil Da Agony and Evidence)	Johnson Jr.; Jason Smith; Michael Perretta; Oroc	DJ Babu	5:20
8.	"The Good Green" (featuring Dodee Westbeach)	Johnson Jr.; Oroc	DJ Babu	6:24
9.	"Keep Doin' It"	Johnson Jr.; Oroc	DJ Babu	3:32
10.	"One Time" (featuring Krondon and Planet Asia)	Johnson Jr.; Marvin Jones; Jason Green; Oroc	DJ Babu	4:30
11.	"D.G. Skit"	Johnson Jr.; Oroc	DJ Babu; Defari (co.)	2:49
12.	"6 in the Morning"	Johnson Jr.; Oroc	DJ Babu; Defari (co.)	3:19
13.	"Ghetto" (featuring Noelle Scaggs)	Johnson Jr.; Oroc	DJ Babu	4:23
14.	"S.C.A.N.S."	Johnson Jr.; Oroc	DJ Babu	3:23
15.	"Dark Ends" (featuring Rakaa Iriscience)	Johnson Jr.; Rakaa Taylor; Oroc	DJ Babu	3:26
16.	"Dreamgirl" (featuring Dodee Westbeach)	Johnson Jr.; Oroc	DJ Babu	4:15
17.	"Brother"	Johnson Jr.; Oroc	DJ Babu	4:04
18.	"The Interview"	Johnson Jr.; Oroc	DJ Babu	4:16
Total length:				1:09:55

== Personnel ==
- Duane "Defari" Johnson – vocals, co-producer (tracks: 11, 12), executive producer, art direction
- Chris "DJ Babu" Oroc – producer, recording, mixing, executive producer, art direction
- Noelle Scaggs – vocals (tracks: 2, 13)
- Jason "Phil Da Agony" Smith – vocals (track 7)
- Michael "Evidence" Peretta – vocals (track 7)
- Dodee Westbeach – vocals (tracks: 8, 16)
- Marvin "Krondon" Jones – vocals (track 10)
- Jason "Planet Asia" Green – vocals (track 10)
- Rakaa "Iriscience" Taylor – vocals (track 15)
- Gene Grimaldi – mastering
- Ben "Beni B" Nickleberry Jr. – executive producer
- Diane M. Payes – project coordinator
- Soap Design Co., LA – art direction, design
- Block – photography
