= Directors of Photography =

Studio album by Dilated Peoples
- Released: August 12, 2014
- Recorded: 2012–2014
- Studio: Soundproof (Venice, CA); The Drug Lab (Los Angeles, CA)
- Genre: Hip-hop
- Length: 55:47
- Label: Rhymesayers
- Producer: 9th Wonder; Alchemist; Bravo; Diamond D; DJ Babu; DJ Premier; Evidence; Jake One; Oh No; Twiz The Beat Pro

Dilated Peoples chronology
20/20 (2006)	Directors of Photography (2014)

Directors of Photography is the fifth studio album by American hip-hop trio Dilated Peoples. It was released on August 12, 2014, via Rhymesayers Entertainment. The recording sessions took place at Soundproof in Venice with additional recording at The Drug Lab in Los Angeles. The album was produced by members Evidence and DJ Babu, as well as Alchemist, 9th Wonder, Bravo, Diamond D, DJ Premier, Jake One, Oh No, and Twiz the Beat Pro. It features guest appearances from Aloe Blacc, Catero, Defari, Gangrene, Krondon, Sick Jacken, Vince Staples, with Action Bronson, Domo Genesis, Fashawn, Rapsody, and Vinnie Paz appearing on one of the two bonus tracks.

The album debuted at number 41 on the Billboard 200 and number 9 on the Top R&B/Hip-Hop Albums, with first-week sales of 6,566 copies in the United States. It also made it to number 19 on the Swiss Hitparade.

== Background ==
In a June 2012 interview with AllHipHop, Evidence spoke about the album, saying: "Directors of Photography is the next Dilated Peoples album and I’m excited about it, nervous about it, everything in between. We never broke up or anything like that, we’ve been supporting each other on our solo missions. Most people who know the details about Dilated know that we’re solo artists who came together to make something bigger and this is just a return to genesis so to speak". He continued: "Sometimes we’ve got to be conscious of each other when we’re in a group because not all of our views reflect each others visions all the time. So it’s been fun to just do what we wanted to do in these off years, solo, expressing ourselves. I think our next Dilated record could really be a great sound because of this freedom we’ve had. I’m looking forward to it". In an October 2013, interview with HipHopDX, DJ Babu spoke about the recording process, saying:

"In this process, not that much has changed. You'd be surprised how easily you fall back into your roles and understand where you fit in with each other. Being in the studio is definitely something that we love and something that we would probably do whether we had a Dilated album to work on or not. We're like studio rats. Ev was definitely producing the shit out of this record. All of us, but Ev was really striving for a sound. We still are striving for a particular cohesive sound that we're trying to get. Things have changed since we've been around, but we're trying to walk a fine line between keeping it classic and pushing it forward...We've spent a lot of time sharpening our swords and I feel like Ev's been leading us in that direction, to really try new things while still being us".

Evidence spoke about the album's production, saying: "Babu and I are doing the majority of the production, which is very different from when we were just excited to have two or three tracks on an album before. I think we still are excited just to have two or three [songs on the album], but it's working out that we're getting more. It changes everything when you are really self-making an album and not hiring people. It's really different. Not to mention, we're making music in our studio with different mixing techniques. We're from an analogue era, so we're doing things differently right now".

Rakaa Iriscience also spoke on the album's production, saying: "Before we even started the record, they kind of took on the responsibility of being the main producers for the album. That means figuring out what's gonna happen to the beats, but that also means making the songs the best they can be, even if they didn't make the beat. It is a very personal thing, but to see how much both of them have internalised it emotionally, the passion is very much there. It's kind of a two-edged sword, really, but ultimately, Dilated Peoples has made our best work when there's some kind of friction that leads to some kind of heed, when everyone sees something out of the potential and we're all just figuring out how to stress the same thing. On this record, there's been a lot of that magic. I think a lot of that has come out of Ev and Babs being very personal...In this group, I think Ev and Babs have really brought direction to the table".

Evidence also spoke about why they chose Directors of Photography as the album title, saying: "I always said that Directors of Photography would be a dope title so I could tie some personal stuff that I wanted to with my mom's situation or photography or whatever. I think that's the dynamic of this album, learning from our personal experiences and bringing it to Dilated. We used to rap about rapping. We would rap about how we were tight, or we would have an anthem, or we'd make a concept and rap around the concept, but this time, I think, we're letting who we are show a little bit. We've done so much growth as solo artists. To not bring it up at all here and pretend we haven't had this off time or we haven't had this growth period, it would be a disservice".

== Critical reception ==
Professional ratings
Aggregate scores
Source	Rating
Metacritic	75/100
Review scores
Source	Rating
AllMusic	3.5/5 stars
Consequence of Sound	B−
Exclaim!	8/10
HipHopDX	4.5/5
laut.de	4/5 stars
PopMatters	6/10
RapReviews	8.5/10
XXL	4/5 (XL)

Directors of Photography was met with generally favorable reviews from music critics. At Metacritic, which assigns a normalized rating out of 100 to reviews from mainstream publications, the album received an average score of 75, based on six reviews.

Homer Johnsen of HipHopDX praised the album calling it "a top-notch effort. Production and lyrics are both outstanding, and there are few qualms, if none at all". Del F. Cowie of Exclaim! noted that "on their return, they sound wiser and refreshed". Praverb of XXL found that the album "shows that three artists that have achieved individual success can come together once again to create something substantial despite years of inactivity". AllMusic's David Jeffries wrote: "this is the satisfying return album fans have waited for, no more, and certainly no less". Sheldon Pearce of Consequence of Sound found that the album "both in its lyricism and musicality, upholds traditional rap principles with a commitment to the underground as an abstract ideal".

In a mixed review, Kevin Catchpole of PopMatters stated: "it harkens back to the clever minimalism of The Platform, while incorporating all they've learned since their early days as a group. And though it is an uneven affair, it's a welcome breath of fresh air in the hip-hop world of 2014".

=== Accolades ===
Accolades for Directors of Photography
Publication	Accolade	Rank	Ref.
HipHopDX	Top 25 Albums Of 2014	—N/a	

== Track listing ==
No.	Title	Writer(s)	Producer(s)	Length
1.	"Intro"	Michael Perretta; Rakaa Taylor; Chris Oroc	Evidence; DJ Babu	0:53
2.	"Directors"	Perretta; Taylor; Oroc	Evidence	3:31
3.	"Cut My Teeth"	Perretta; Taylor; Oroc; Alan Maman	The Alchemist	3:40
4.	"Defari Interlude"	Perretta; Taylor; Oroc; Duane A. Johnson Jr.	Evidence	1:20
5.	"The Dark Room" (featuring Vince Staples)	Perretta; Taylor; Oroc; Vincent Staples	Evidence; Twiz the Beat Pro	4:19
6.	"Good as Gone"	Perretta; Taylor; Oroc; Chris Martin	DJ Premier	3:45
7.	"Show Me the Way" (featuring Aloe Blacc)	Perretta; Taylor; Oroc; Egbert Nathaniel Dawkins III; Jacob Dutton	Jake One	4:08
8.	"Figure It Out (Melvin's Theme)"	Perretta; Taylor; Oroc	DJ Babu	4:25
9.	"Let Your Thoughts Fly Away"	Perretta; Taylor; Oroc; Joseph Kirkland	Diamond D	4:27
10.	"Century of the Self" (featuring Catero)	Perretta; Taylor; Oroc; Catero Colbert; Michael Jackson	Oh No	3:38
11.	"@mrevidence Interlude"		Evidence	1:11
12.	"The Reversal"	Perretta; Taylor; Oroc	DJ Babu	2:51
13.	"Opinions May Vary" (featuring Gangrene)	Perretta; Taylor; Oroc; Maman; Jackson	DJ Babu	4:15
14.	"Trouble"	Perretta; Taylor; Oroc; Tavish Graham	Evidence; Bravo	4:35
15.	"L.A. River Drive" (featuring Sick Jacken)	Perretta; Taylor; Oroc; Jack Gonzalez; Maman	The Alchemist	4:41
16.	"The Bigger Picture" (featuring Krondon)	Perretta; Taylor; Oroc; Marvin Jones; Patrick Douthit	9th Wonder	4:07
Total length:				55:47

MP3 edition bonus tracks
No.	Title	Writer(s)	Producer(s)	Length
17.	"Times Squared"	Perretta; Taylor; Oroc	Evidence	3:05
18.	"Hallelujah" (featuring Fashawn, Rapsody, Domo Genesis, Vinnie Paz and Action Bronson)	Perretta; Taylor; Oroc; Santiago Leyva; Marlanna Evans; Dominique Marquis Cole; Vincenzo Luviner; Ariyan Arslani	DJ Babu	5:46

== Personnel ==
- Michael "Evidence" Peretta – vocals, producer (tracks: 1, 2, 4, 5, 11, 14), recording, executive producer, photography, liner notes
- Rakaa "Iriscience" Taylor – vocals, recording, executive producer, photography, liner notes
- Chris "DJ Babu" Oroc – scratches, producer (tracks: 1, 8, 12, 13), recording, executive producer, photography, liner notes
- Duane A. "Defari" Johnson Jr. – vocals (track 4)
- Vince Staples – vocals (track 5)
- Egbert Nathaniel "Aloe Blacc" Dawkins III – vocals (track 7)
- Catero Colbert – vocals (track 10)
- Alan "The Alchemist" Maman – vocals (track 13), producer (tracks: 3, 15)
- Michael "Oh No" Jackson – vocals (track 13), producer (track 10)
- Joaquin "Sick Jacken" Gonzalez – vocals (track 15)
- Marvin "Krondon" Jones – vocals (track 16)
- Anthony Brewster – additional keyboards (track 2)
- Timothy "Twiz The Beat Pro" McRae – producer (track 5)
- Christopher "DJ Premier" Martin – producer (track 6)
- Jacob "Jake One" Dutton – producer (track 7)
- Joseph "Diamond D" Kirkland – producer (track 9)
- Tavish "Bravo" Graham – producer (track 14)
- Patrick "9th Wonder" Douthit – producer (track 16)
- Frederico Lopez – additional recording (tracks: 2, 9)
- Eddie Sancho – mixing
- Richard Parks Vallely – engineering (track 6)
- Joe LaPorta – mastering
- Brent Sayers – executive producer
- Ivory Daniel – executive producer, management
- Kevin Zinger – executive producer, management
- Sean "Slug" Daley – executive producer
- Tristan Eaton – creative director
- Ashanti Abdullah – project coordinator
- Jason Cook – project coordinator
- Skye Rossi – project coordinator
- Brian "B+" Cross – photography
- Robert "Skinhead Rob" Aston – photography
- DJ Todaa – photography

== Charts ==
Chart (2014)	Peak position
Swiss Albums (Schweizer Hitparade)	19
UK R&B Albums (OCC)	21
UK Independent Albums (OCC)	31
US Billboard 200	41
US Top R&B/Hip-Hop Albums (Billboard)	9
