= Expansion Team (album) =

Studio album by Dilated Peoples
- Released: October 23, 2001
- Recorded: 2001
- Studios: D&D Studios (New York, NY); The Dewgarde Crib Of Hits (New York, NY); Soundproof (Los Angeles, CA); Encore Studios (Burbank, CA); Skip Saylor Recording (Northridge, CA); Front Page Recorders (Glendale, CA); The Studio (Philadelphia, PA); Mad Dog Studios (Burbank, CA)
- Genre: Hip hop
- Length: 1:00:47
- Label: Capitol
- Producers: Alchemist; Da Beatminerz; DJ Babu; DJ Premier; Evidence; Joey Chavez; JuJu; Questlove

Dilated Peoples chronology
The Platform (2000)	Expansion Team (2001)	Neighborhood Watch (2004)

Singles from Expansion Team
- 1. "Worst Comes to Worst" Released: 2001; 2. "Live on Stage" Released: 2001

Expansion Team is the second studio album by American hip hop trio Dilated Peoples. It was released on October 23, 2001, through Capitol Records. The recording sessions took place at D&D Studios and The Dewgarde Crib of Hits in New York, at SoundProof and Skip Saylor Recording in Los Angeles, at Encore Studios and Mad Dog Studios in Burbank, at Front Page Recorders in Glendale, and at The Studio in Philadelphia. The album was produced by members Evidence and DJ Babu, as well as Alchemist, Joey Chavez, Da Beatminerz, DJ Premier, Juju, and Questlove. It features guest appearances from Black Thought, the Beat Junkies members DJ Rhettmatic, J. Rocc and Melo-D, and the Likwit Crew members Defari, Phil Da Agony and tha Alkaholiks, with cameo appearances from Cokni O'Dire, GuRu, Noelle Scaggs, and Shae Fiol.

The album debuted at number 36 on the Billboard 200 and number 8 on the Top R&B/Hip-Hop Albums in the United States. It also made it to number 55 on the UK Albums Chart and number 10 on the UK Hip Hop and R&B Albums Chart, as well as number 88 in Scotland, and number 136 in France. Its lead single, "Worst Comes to Worst", peaked at number 29 on the UK Singles Chart.

== Critical reception ==
Professional ratings
Aggregate scores
Source	Rating
Metacritic	71/100
Review scores
Source	Rating
AllMusic	4.5/5 stars
Robert Christgau	(1-star Honorable Mention)
Entertainment Weekly	B+
HipHopDX	4/5
laut.de	4/5 stars
RapReviews	8.5/10
Spin	6/10

Expansion Team was met with generally favorable reviews from music critics. At Metacritic, which assigns a normalized rating out of 100 to reviews from mainstream publications, the album received an average score of 71, based on twelve reviews.

Evan Serpick of Entertainment Weekly described the album as "L.A.'s underground hip-hop heroes sound like a welcome throwback to rap's politically conscious and musically diverse early-'90s period". E! Online reviewer wrote: "radio stations will still probably ignore the old-school, stylish singles like "Proper Propaganda" and "Heavy Rotation" that make Expansion Team a winner". CDNow compared the album with their previous effort stating: "more polished sonic effort than Dilated's 2000 debut, The Platform". Nathan Rabin of The A.V. Club saw the album "makes good on The Platform's promise by showcasing a battle-tested but exuberant group at the top of its form". Billboard reviewer wrote: "the 16-track set showcases Dilated's combination of intelligent lyrics and mind-blowing production". Dotmusic reviewer wrote: "in a time when the music is either dominated by commercial personas or the proteges of the new breed of super producers, Expansion Team is an essential shot in the arm for the increasingly stagnant underground". Urb critic found that the album "reveals Dilated Peoples to be a straight-up hip-hop group, for better or worse".

In mixed reviews, Blender saw the album "bursts with neat production touches". Alternative Press found "the only problem is that in making way for all the MCs, Dilated's tracks seem too peripheral, keeping Expansion from sustaining the momentum its MCs command". Q magazine reviewer wrote: "DJ Babu looks to the old school for his mix of melody and beats, giving the whole project a fluid and classy feel with more than a nod to their heroes, Run-DMC". Neil Drumming writing for Spin resumed: "Dilated Peoples continue to hold down hip-hop's middle ground with inoffensive mic purism and sophisticated production a la mid-'90s DJ Premier".

== Track listing ==
No.	Title	Writer(s)	Producer(s)	Length
1.	"Live on Stage"	Michael Perretta; Rakaa Taylor; Alan Maman	The Alchemist	4:41
2.	"Worst Comes to Worst"	Perretta; Taylor; Maman; William Bell; Booker T. Jones; Albert Johnson; Kejuan Muchita	The Alchemist	3:36
3.	"Clockwork"	Perretta; Taylor; Christopher Martin	DJ Premier	3:48
4.	"Trade Money"	Perretta; Taylor; Walter Dewgarde; Ewart Dewgarde	Da Beatminerz	5:38
5.	"Heavy Rotation" (featuring Tha Liks)	Perretta; Taylor; Rico Smith; James Robinson; Eric Brooks	Evidence; Joey Chavez (add.)	5:15
6.	"Self Defense"	Perretta; Taylor; Jerry Tineo	Juju	3:36
7.	"Phil da Agony Interlude"	Jason Smith; Chris Oroc	DJ Babu	0:42
8.	"Proper Propaganda"	Taylor; Oroc; Tim McQueen; John Brown; Claude Johnson; Edward Schell	DJ Babu	3:56
9.	"Dilated Junkies" (featuring J. Rocc, DJ Rhettmatic and Melo-D)	Perretta; Taylor; Oroc	Evidence; DJ Babu	4:12
10.	"Panic"	Perretta; Maman	The Alchemist	3:49
11.	"Pay Attention"	Taylor; Oroc	DJ Babu	3:24
12.	"Night Life"	Perretta; Joey Chavez	Joey Chavez	4:14
13.	"War"	Taylor; Ahmir Thompson	?uestlove	1:32
14.	"Hard Hitters" (featuring Black Thought)	Perretta; Taylor; Oroc; Tarik Trotter; David Porter; Ronnie Williams	DJ Babu	3:56
15.	"Defari Interlude"	Perretta; Duane A. Johnson Jr.	Evidence	1:50
16.	"Expansion Team Theme"	Perretta; Taylor; Chavez	Joey Chavez; Metis Cole (co.)	6:38
Total length:				1:00:47

Sample credits

- Track 2 contains elements of "I Forgot to Be Your Lover" performed by William Bell and elements of "Survival of the Fittest" performed by Mobb Deep.
- Track 3 contains elements of "DBC Let the Music Play" performed by Stetsasonic.
- Track 8 contains elements of "Sanity" performed by New York City.
- Track 14 contains elements of "Too Real to Live a Lie" performed by David Porter.

== Personnel ==
- Michael "Evidence" Peretta – vocals, producer (tracks: 5, 9, 15), recording (tracks: 4, 9, 12, 14, 16), sequencing
- Rakaa "Iriscience" Taylor – vocals, recording (tracks: 4, 9, 12, 14, 16), sequencing
- Chris "DJ Babu" Oroc – scratches, producer (tracks: 7–9, 11, 14), recording (tracks: 4, 8, 9, 11, 14, 16), mixing (track 11), sequencing
- Keith "Guru" Elam – additional vocals (track 2)
- Olivier "Cokni O'Dire" Williams – additional vocals (track 4)
- Rico "Tash" Smith – vocals (track 5)
- James "J-Ro" Robinson – vocals (track 5)
- Shae Geever – additional vocals (track 5)
- Jason "Phil Da Agony" Smith – vocals (track 7)
- Noelle Scaggs – additional vocals (track 12)
- Tariq "Black Thought" Trotter – vocals (track 14)
- Duane A. "Defari" Johnson Jr. – vocals (track 15)
- Chris "DJ Premier" Martin – scratches & producer (track 3)
- Jason "J. Rocc" Jackson – scratches (track 9)
- Nazareth "DJ Rhettmatic" Nirza – scratches (track 9)
- David "Melo-D" Mendoza – scratches (track 9)
- Anton Pukshansky – bass (track 15), recording (track 7), mixing (tracks: 7, 9, 15, 16)
- Kurt "DJ Revolution" Hoffman – scratches (track 15), sequencing
- Alan "The Alchemist" Maman – producer (tracks: 1, 2, 10)
- Ewart "Evil Dee" Dewgarde – producer & recording (track 4)
- Walter "Mr. Walt" Dewgarde – producer (track 4)
- Jerry "JuJu" Tineo – producer (track 6)
- Joey Chavez – producer (tracks: 12, 16), additional producer (track 5)
- Ahmir "?uestlove" Thompson – producer (track 13)
- Metis Cole – co-producer (track 16)
- Kevin Bergman – recording (track 1)
- Leo "Swift" Morris – recording (tracks: 1, 2)
- Kieran Walsh – mixing (tracks: 1, 8, 14)
- Eddie Sancho – mixing (tracks: 2, 4, 6, 10), recording (track 3)
- Norty Cotto – mixing (track 3)
- Dexter Thibou – recording (track 4)
- James McCrone – recording (track 5)
- Troy Staton – mixing (tracks: 5, 12)
- Jason Vescio – recording (track 6)
- Jason Bacher – recording (track 10)
- Brandon Winslow – mixing (track 11)
- Scott Oyster – recording & mixing (track 13)
- Jeff Chestek – recording (track 13)
- Bernie Grundman – mastering
- Brent Rollins – art direction
- Brian "B+" Cross – photography
- Block – photography
- Ron Laffitte – A&R
- Hope Carr – sample clearance

== Charts ==
Chart (2001–02)	Peak position
French Albums (SNEP)	136
Scottish Albums (Official Charts)	88
UK Albums (Official Charts)	55
UK R&B Albums (Official Charts)	10
US Billboard 200	36
US Top R&B/Hip-Hop Albums (Billboard)	8

== Certifications ==
Region	Certification	Certified units/sales
United Kingdom (BPI)	Silver	60,000^{^}
^{^} Shipments figures based on certification alone.
