= Stocktown =

Art collective and cultural project

- Formation: January 1, 1998; 28 years ago
- Founder: Teddy Goitom
- Legal status: Collective
- Purpose: Documenting worldwide street culture
- Headquarters: Stockholm, Sweden
- Region served: Worldwide
- Official language: English
- Parent organization: Rötter ("Roots")
- Website: stocktown.com

Stocktown started out in the late 1990s as a collective documenting all aspects of street culture via an online magazine, documentaries, exhibitions, music- and film festivals. Stocktown was founded by Teddy Goitom, and is based in Stockholm, Sweden but has collaborated with artists, filmmakers, graphic designers, programmers, architects and fashion designers all over the world. In the years since it was founded, Stocktown has produced several series’ of documentaries covering international street culture in its various forms. Stocktown also runs an online video magazine focusing on worldwide street culture.

== History ==
Stocktown is the name of the various cultural projects of Swedish based group Rötter ("Roots"). Although based in Sweden, it's been active in various countries, tying together local forms of street culture through an online magazine, documentaries, exhibitions, music- and film festivals. Stocktown started out in the late 1990s as a collective of creative souls documenting all aspects of street culture via documentaries, pirate television and various exhibition projects. Stocktown was founded by Teddy Goitom and is based in Stockholm, Sweden but has always collaborated with artists, filmmakers, graphic designers, programmers, architects and fashion designers all over the world.

== Stocktown projects ==
=== Online ===
In 2011 Stocktown launched an online video magazine dedicated to worldwide street culture. It's curated by a committed team of video enthusiasts searching for the most inspiring content out there. During the summer of 2011, the content from the site was displayed as a part of the exhibition StockTV at Kulturhuset in Stockholm.

=== Documentaries ===
To date Stocktown has created two documentary series, Stocktown - A Global Underground Journey and Stocktown Africa.

==== Stocktown - A Global Underground Journey ====
In 2002, the TV series Stocktown - A Global Underground Journey was broadcast by the Swedish public broadcasting channel SVT1. The first six episodes had an average 200 000 viewers and were later, in 2004, broadcast in Denmark and Finland. Stocktown - A Global Underground Journey featured interviews with artists such as DJ Spooky, Immortal Technique and Kool Keith and was shot in Los Angeles, Sydney, New York, Hawaii, Tokyo. In 2006, it was released as a DVD with extra material. In 2008, Stocktown released all 9 episodes for free on the Internet, it can currently be viewed at Vimeo, Internet Archive and downloaded as torrents on the Piratebay tracker.

==== Stocktown Africa ====
Stocktown Africa is a documentary series about the lively, creative and social contemporary culture blossoming in Africa’s big cities today. Stocktown Africa will bring you face to face with the new urban Africa, where fashion creators, mobile phone journalists, cultural entrepreneurs, music producers and guerrilla filmmakers define what it is to be young, talented and passionate in Africa’s 21st century.

===== Stocktown x South Africa =====
Stocktown X South Africa is a road movie directed by Swedish-based directors Teddy Goitom and Benjamin Taft. Stocktown X South Africa takes viewers beyond the stereotypical stories coming out of South Africa. The documentary introduces heavy metal band Ree-Burth, Soweto style-setters Smarteez and Gazelle, the inventor of the Limpop music genre, capturing the creative energy and street vibes of Johannesburg and Cape Town. In 2011 Stocktown x South Africa premiered at Cinemafrica film festival in Stockholm, Sweden, and it was featured in various international news media and blogs, including being featured on CNN and shown at international exhibitions and film festivals, such as at the Victoria and Albert museum in London., Swedish Educational Broadcasting Company, Africa In The Picture Festival in Amsterdam, the Netherlands, Basel African Cinema in Basel, Switzerland.

Xander Ferreira and Nick Matthews aka DJ Invisible of the South African band Gazelle in Stocktown X South Africa.

=== Exhibitions ===
One of the first public exhibitions was the graffiti exhibition The Arrow which was organized in conjuncture with the music festival Fanclub, held outside of Stockholm July 24 to 26 in 1998. Graffiti legends such as Blade, Futura 2000, Quik and Seen showcased their art on canvas in one of the most celebrated and controversial exhibitions of graffiti art in Sweden.

In 2004, Stocktown participated in the Swedish Japanese exchange Swedish Style in Tokyo

=== Music festivals & concerts ===
Within the framework of the Stockholm European Capital of Culture of 1998, Stocktown organized the hip hop element Stocktown 1998 of the well attended Fanclub festival in Lida, south of Stockholm. All of the four elements of hip hop culture, B-Boying, DJing, MCing and graffiti) were featured, rather than the typical focus of music festivals on only rappers and to a lesser extent DJs. DJ’s such as Cut Chemist & DJ Nu-Mark (from Jurassic 5), as well as DJ Babu (of the Beat Junkies/Dilated Peoples) had turntablist performances that were previously almost unheard of in Swedish music festivals.

=== Film festivals ===
On October 2 to 4 1998, Stocktown together with alternative film festival Popcorn organized Blaxplo as a tribute to classical Blaxploitation movies such as Shaft, Coffy and Foxy Brown but also to give a proper background to the cultural roots of contemporary street culture. Going beyond the exploitative aspect of the classics, the event highlighted the plight of the black community in United States by organizing a well attended seminar and discussion on the contemporary prison-industrial complex in the United States and resistance to it with scholar of comparative religion Mattias Gardell.

As the film festival Popcorn developed into a music film festival in 2002, Stocktown was chosen to curate the films about hip hop and reggae.
