= International Turntablist Federation =

DJ battle organizer (1990s-2000s)

The International Turntablist Federation (ITF) was an organization which held a series of DJ battles during the rise of turntablism in the late 90s and early 2000s. The ITF is notable for introducing the concept of category competitions. The categories included advancement, scratching, beat juggling, and team.

The ITF eventually evolved into the IDA, but during its height in the early 2000s, the ITF was considered a close second to the DMC in the world of international DJ battles. Many of the winners (e.g., A-Trak, Craze, i.e. Merge, Rafik, and C2C) were prominent members of the turntablist community and were champions in other competitions.

== Advancement Category Winners ==
- 1996 - Total Eclipse - First ITF battle
- 1997 - Vinroc
- 1998 - Vinroc
- 1999 - A-Trak
- 2000 - A-Trak
- 2001 - Woody - First European ITF Champion
- 2002 - Kodh
- 2003 - Tiger Style
- 2004 - Rafik
- 2005 - Pro Zeiko

== Scratch Category Winners ==
- 1997 - Babu
- 1998 - Craze
- 1999 - Prime Cuts
- 2000 - Prime Cuts
- 2001 - Spryte One
- 2002 - i.e. Merge
- 2003 - Flip
- 2004 - Rafik
- 2005 - Rafik

== Beat Juggling Category Winners ==
- 1997 - Babu
- 1998 - Develop
- 1999 - Lil Jaz
- 2000 - Infamous
- 2001 - Jr. Flo
- 2002 - Troubl
- 2003 - Kid Fresh
- 2004 - Rasgunyado
- 2005 - Pro Zeiko

== Team Category Winners ==
- 1997 - Beat Junkies
- 1998 - Beat Junkies
- 1999 - Allies
- 2000 - Scratch Action Hiro
- 2001 - Nocturnal Sound Crew
- 2002 - Nocturnal Sound Crew
- 2003 - Lordz of Fitness
- 2004 - Lordz of Fitness
- 2005 - C2C

== Experimental Category Winners ==
- 2005 J-RED (World's first Visual routine)
