= This Way (Dilated Peoples song) =

Single by Dilated Peoples featuring Kanye West

from the album Neighborhood Watch
- Released: April 12, 2004
- Recorded: 2003–04
- Genre: Hip hop
- Length: 4:06
- Label: Capitol; Parlophone
- Songwriters: Michael Perretta; Rakaa Taylor; Chris Oroc; Kanye West; Jimmie Cameron; Vella Cameron
- Producer: Kanye West

Dilated Peoples singles chronology
"Downtown" (2002)	"This Way" (2004)	"Love & War" (2004)

Kanye West singles chronology
"Talk About Our Love" (2004)	"This Way" (2004)	"Jesus Walks" (2004)

"This Way" is a song by American hip hop group Dilated Peoples featuring fellow American rapper and record producer Kanye West. It was released on April 12, 2004 via Parlophone and Capitol Records as the second single from the group's fourth studio album Neighborhood Watch. Produced by West, it utilises a sample from "Old Men" by Jimmie & Vella Cameron.

The song was featured in a marketing campaign for the Volvo S40. Both the commercial and music video were directed by Dave Meyers.

== Track listing ==
CD single/Digital download (UK)

1. "This Way" - 3:54
2. "Poisonous" - 3:39

Promo CD" single (US and Europe)

A-side

1. "This Way" (Radio Version) - 3:54
2. "This Way" (Instrumental) - 3:54

B-side

1. "This Way" (A Cappella) - 3:54 (EU), 3:56 (US)

12" single (UK)

A-side

1. "This Way" (Radio Version) - 3:54

B-side

1. "This Way" (Instrumental) - 3:54
2. "This Way" (A Cappella) - 3:56

Promo 12" single (US and Europe)

1. "This Way" (Radio Version) - 3:54
2. "This Way" (Instrumental) - 3:54
3. "This Way" (A Cappella) - 3:56

== Commercial performance ==
The song peaked at number 78 on the Billboard Hot 100, number 41 on the Hot R&B/Hip-Hop Songs and number 22 on the Hot Rap Songs in the United States. It also reached number 25 on the UK singles chart.

== Charts ==
Chart (2004)	Peak position
UK Singles (Official Charts)	35
UK Hip Hop/R&B (Official Charts)	10
US Billboard Hot 100	78
US Hot R&B/Hip-Hop Songs (Billboard)	41
US Hot Rap Songs (Billboard)	22
