= Street Music (album) =

Studio album by Defari
- Released: August 8, 2006
- Studios: Soundproof (Los Angeles, CA); Unsung Studios (Sherman Oaks, CA); Likwit Studio (Los Angeles, CA)
- Genre: Hip-hop
- Length: 56:30
- Label: ABB Records
- Producers: Alchemist; DJ Babu; E-Swift; Evidence; Mike City; Superstar Quamallah

Defari chronology
The L.J.'s (2005)	Street Music (2006)	Rare Poise (2017)

Singles from Street Music
- 1. "Make My Own" Released: August 8, 2006

Professional ratings
Review scores
Source	Rating
AllHipHop	3.5/5 stars
HipHopDX	3/5
PopMatters	5/10
RapReviews	6.5/10

Street Music is the third studio album by American rapper and Likwit Crew member Defari. It was released on August 8, 2006, via ABB Records. Recording sessions took place at Soundproof, Unsung Studios and Likwit Studio in Los Angeles. Production was handled by Evidence, Mike City, DJ Babu, Superstar Quamallah, Alchemist and E-Swift, with Beni B and Defari serving as executive producers. It features guest appearances from Dilated Peoples, J-Ro, Boo Kapone, B-Real, Threat and Tuffy.

== Track listing ==
No.	Title	Writer(s)	Producer(s)	Length
1.	"Hardworker"	Duane A. Johnson Jr.; Michael Perretta	Evidence	3:14
2.	"Either Dead or in Jail" (featuring Tuffy and Boo Kapone)	Johnson Jr.; Vincent Morgan; J. Johnson; Michael Flowers	Mike City	4:17
3.	"Congratulations"	Johnson Jr.; Perretta	Evidence	4:16
4.	"Peace and Gangsta"	Johnson Jr.; Perretta	Evidence	2:41
5.	"Make My Own" (featuring Evidence and Noelle Scaggs)	Johnson Jr.; Perretta; Alan Maman	Alchemist	3:53
6.	"West West" (featuring Noelle Scaggs)	Johnson Jr.; Flowers	Mike City	3:38
7.	"We've Been Doin' This" (featuring Threat and J-Ro)	Johnson Jr.; Corey Lloyd Brown; James Robinson; Eric Brooks	E-Swift	3:44
8.	"Burn Big"	Johnson Jr.; Chris Oroc	DJ Babu	3:36
9.	"Barwork"	Johnson Jr.; Perretta	Evidence	3:37
10.	"Deepest Regards" (featuring B-Real and J-Ro)	Johnson Jr.; Louis Freese; Robinson; Flowers	Mike City	3:58
11.	"People Trip"	Johnson Jr.; Perretta	Evidence	3:53
12.	"Clowns" (featuring Dilated Peoples)	Johnson Jr.; Perretta; Rakaa Taylor; John Patton Jr.	Superstar Quamallah	4:16
13.	"The Bizness"	Johnson Jr.; Patton Jr.	Superstar Quamallah	3:13
14.	"Don't Be Mad at Me"	Johnson Jr.; Flowers	Mike City	3:37
15.	"Vultures"	Johnson Jr.; Oroc	DJ Babu	4:37
Total length:				56:30

== Personnel ==
- Duane "Defari" Johnson – vocals, executive producer
- Vincent "Tuffy" Morgan – vocals (track 2)
- J. "Boo Kapone" Johnson – vocals (track 2)
- Michael "Evidence" Peretta – vocals (tracks: 5, 12), producer (tracks: 1, 3, 4, 9, 11), recording (tracks: 1, 3–5, 9, 11–13), mixing (track 4)
- Noelle Scaggs – additional vocals (tracks: 5, 6)
- Corey Lloyd Brown – vocals (track 7)
- James "J-Ro" Robinson – vocals (tracks: 7, 10)
- Louis "B-Real" Freese – vocals (track 10)
- Rakaa "Iriscience" Taylor – vocals (track 12)
- Chris "DJ Babu" Oroc – scratches (tracks: 11, 12), producer & recording (tracks: 8, 15)
- Michael "Mike City" Flowers – producer (tracks: 2, 6, 10, 14)
- Alan "The Alchemist" Maman – producer (track 5)
- Eric "E-Swift" Brooks – producer & recording (track 7)
- John "Superstar Quamallah" Patton Jr. – producer (tracks: 12, 13)
- Francis Graham – recording (track: 2, 6, 10, 14)
- Richard "Segal" Huredia – mixing (tracks: 1–3, 5–15)
- Gene Grimaldi – mastering
- Ben "Beni B" Nickleberry Jr. – executive producer
- Justin Herman – cover
- Barry Underhill – photography
- Tyler Shields – photography
- Diane M. Payes – marketing, publicity
