= Neighborhood Watch (album) =

Studio album by Dilated Peoples
- Released: April 6, 2004
- Recorded: 2003–04
- Studios: D&D Studios (New York, NY); Soundproof Recordings; The Nodd Factor (Houston, TX); Larrabee West (West Hollywood, CA); Ameraycan Studios (North Hollywood, CA); Record Plant (Los Angeles, CA)
- Genre: Hip hop
- Length: 57:22
- Label: Capitol
- Producers: Alchemist; DJ AM; DJ Babu; Evidence; Joey Chavez; Kanye West; Nucleus; Rob "Reef" Tewlow

Dilated Peoples chronology
Expansion Team (2001)	Neighborhood Watch (2004)	20/20 (2006)

Singles from Neighborhood Watch
- 1. "Marathon" Released: September 16, 2003; 2. "This Way" Released: June 15, 2004

Neighborhood Watch is the third studio album by American hip hop trio Dilated Peoples. It was released on April 6, 2004, through Capitol Records. The recording sessions took place at D&D Studios in New York, at Soundproof Recordings, at the Nodd Factor in Houston, at Larrabee West in West Hollywood, at Ameraycan Studios in North Hollywood, and at Record Plant in Los Angeles. The album was produced by members Evidence and DJ Babu, as well as Alchemist, Joey Chavez, Kanye West, Nucleus, Rob "Reef" Tewlow, and DJ AM. It features guest appearances from Defari, Devin the Dude, J. Rocc, Kanye West, Phil da Agony, and Planet Asia.

The album debuted at number 55 on the Billboard 200 and number 16 on the Top R&B/Hip-Hop Albums in the United States. It also made it to number 96 on the UK Albums Chart and number 16 on the UK Hip Hop and R&B Albums Chart, as well as number 91 in Switzerland, and number 155 in France. Its lead single, "This Way", peaked at number 78 on the Billboard Hot 100 and number 35 on the UK Singles Chart. The album also features the singles "Marathon" and "Poisonous", as well as the DJ showcase "DJ Babu in Deep Concentration", an ode to Gang Starr's 1989 track "DJ Premier in Deep Concentration".

== Critical reception ==
Professional ratings
Aggregate scores
Source	Rating
Metacritic	62/100
Review scores
Source	Rating
AllHipHop	3.5/5
AllMusic	2.5/5 stars
Robert Christgau	(choice cut)
Gigwise	3/5 stars
The Guardian	3/5 stars
HipHopDX	3.5/5
RapReviews	8/10
Spin	C−
Sputnikmusic	3/5
Tiny Mix Tapes	3/5 marks

Neighborhood Watch was met with generally favorable reviews from music critics. At Metacritic, which assigns a normalized rating out of 100 to reviews from mainstream publications, the album received an average score of 62, based on nineteen reviews.

Billboard praised the album, saying "here's a group at the top of its game". Entertainment Weekly found it "suitable for both the streets and chain stores". Q called it "imaginative".

In mixed reviews, Dorian Lynskey of The Guardian wrote: "chunky, hook-laden songs like Tryin' to Breathe and This Way show a newfound sonic confidence, but Dilated Peoples remain astoundingly dull MCs, delivering earnest and predictable rhymes". Tiny Mix Tapes critic wrote: "on Neighborhood Watch, their delivery is stale and unimpressive, much like the overproduced Expansion Team". AllMusic's John Bush stated: "most of the blame for Neighborhood Watch has to go to the previously invincible Alchemist, whose productions are front-loaded on the record. Unfortunately, his beats aren't rugged or hooky, just astonishingly weak". Spin's reviewers wrote: "Evidence and Iriscience remain so humorlessly hard they could guard Buckingham Palace".

== Track listing ==
No.	Title	Writer(s)	Producer(s)	Length
1.	"Marathon"	Michael Perretta; Rakaa Taylor; Chris Oroc; Alan Maman	The Alchemist	5:08
2.	"Neighborhood Watch"	Perretta; R. Taylor; Oroc; Maman; Freddie Robinson; Virginia Bland	The Alchemist	3:26
3.	"Tryin' to Breathe"	Perretta; R. Taylor; Oroc; Rob Tewlow; Larry James Reynolds	Reef	4:08
4.	"Caffeine"	Perretta; R. Taylor; Oroc; West Plischke	Nucleus	4:55
5.	"Who's Who"	Perretta; R. Taylor; Oroc; Adam Goldstein; Gary Wright	Evidence; DJ AM	4:05
6.	"Poisonous" (featuring Devin the Dude)	Perretta; R. Taylor; Oroc; Devin Copeland; Maman	The Alchemist	3:39
7.	"Reach Us"	Perretta; R. Taylor; Oroc; Joey Chavez	Joey Chavez	5:02
8.	"Big Business"	Perretta; R. Taylor; Oroc	DJ Babu; Rakaa (co.)	2;29
9.	"Love and War"	Perretta; R. Taylor; Oroc; Dick Monda; Ted Taylor	Evidence	3:46
10.	"1580 (Skit)" (featuring J. Rocc)			1:13
11.	"World on Wheels"	Perretta; R. Taylor; Oroc; Maman; Milton Edwards	The Alchemist	3:56
12.	"Closed Session" (featuring Defari, Phil Da Agony and Planet Asia)	Perretta; R. Taylor; Oroc; Duane A. Johnson Jr.; Jason Smith; Jason Green; Mose Davis	DJ Babu	6:14
13.	"This Way" (featuring Kanye West)	Perretta; R. Taylor; Oroc; Kanye West; Jimmie Cameron; Vella Cameron	Kanye West	4:05
14.	"DJ Babu in Deep Concentration"	Perretta; R. Taylor; Oroc; Eric Barrier; William Griffin	DJ Babu	5:16
Total length:				57:22

Sample credits

- Track 2 contains elements from "Night Games" by Bobby "Blue" Bland.
- Track 3 embodies portions of "It Ain't Rainin' (On Nobody's House but Mine)" by the Dramatics.
- Track 5 contains samples from "Can't Find the Judge" by Gary Wright.
- Track 9 embodies portions of "I Can't Fake It Anymore" by Ted Taylor.
- Track 11 contains elements from "Lovemaniacs" by Boobie Knight.
- Track 12 contains elements from "Pack of Lies" by the Counts.
- Track 13 features samples from "Old Men" by Jimmie & Vella Cameron.
- Track 14 contains samples from "Stoop Rap" by Double Trouble and samples from "I Ain't No Joke" by Eric B. & Rakim.

== Personnel ==
- Michael "Evidence" Peretta – vocals, producer (tracks: 5, 9), recording (tracks: 1, 3–5, 7–9, 11, 12, 14), executive producer
- Rakaa "Iriscience" Taylor – vocals, co-producer (track 8), recording (tracks: 1, 3–5, 7–9, 11, 12), executive producer
- Chris "DJ Babu" Oroc – scratches, producer (tracks: 8, 12, 14), recording (tracks: 1, 3–5, 7–9, 11, 12, 14), executive producer
- Noelle Scaggs – additional vocals (tracks: 1, 5–7, 9)
- Devin "The Dude" Copeland – vocals (track 6)
- Alejandro "2Mex" Ocana – additional vocals (track 8)
- Jason "J. Rocc" Jackson – vocals (track 10)
- Duane A. "Defari" Johnson Jr. – vocals (track 12)
- Jason "Phil Da Agony" Smith – vocals (track 12)
- Jason "Planet Asia" Smith – vocals (track 12)
- Kanye West – vocals & producer (track 13)
- Alan "The Alchemist" Maman – producer (tracks: 1, 2, 6, 11), recording (tracks: 2, 4, 6), co-executive producer
- Rob "Reef" Tewlow – producer (track 3)
- West "Nucleus" Plischke – producer (track 4)
- Adam "DJ AM" Goldstein – producer (track 5)
- Joey Chavez – producer (track 7)
- Kieran Walsh – recording (tracks: 1, )
- Michael "Domo" Poye – recording (track 6)
- Wassim Zreik – recording (track 13)
- Richard "Segal" Huredia – mixing (tracks: 1, 3, 4, 6, 12), recording (track 6)
- Troy Staton – mixing (tracks: 2, 5, 7–9, 11, 14), recording (tracks: 7, 8)
- Manny Marroquin – mixing (track 13)
- Jeremy Mackenzie – engineering assistant (track 1)
- Kent Hitchcock – engineering assistant (tracks: 2, 5, 7–9, 11, 14)
- Sean Tallman – engineering assistant (tracks: 3, 6, 12)
- Nick Ferrero – engineering assistant (track 4)
- Rabeka Tunei – engineering assistant (track 13)
- Bernie Grundman – mastering
- Ben "Beni B" Nickleberry Jr. – executive producer
- Brian "B+" Cross – photography
- Pat Shannahan – sample clearance
- David "Happy" Walters – management

== Charts ==
Chart (2004)	Peak position
French Albums (SNEP)	155
Swiss Albums (Schweizer Hitparade)	91
UK Albums (Official Charts)	96
UK R&B Albums (Official Charts)	16
US Billboard 200	55
US Top R&B/Hip-Hop Albums (Billboard)	16
