= Ie.Merge =

American hip hop turntablist

ie.Merge (also spelled I-Emerge, I.Emerge, ie.MERGE and ie.MERG, and also known as Blesd) is an American hip hop turntablist who won the 2004 and 2005 DMC World DJ Championships. He has won nine American national titles and four world titles, and is known for his highly technical routines.

== Early history ==
Growing up in Northern New Jersey, Merge (a.k.a. Micheal Weinstein) was heavily influenced by the New York City hip hop scene. At the age of 13 he began DJing local parties and practicing at home. At 17 he met a group of B-boys (Break dancers) in Naples Florida met best friend Omar (B-boy Omar) Lopez where he learned to B-boy and then took the aggressive style of B-boy battling and applied it to Djing. He practiced along with artists such as former X-ecutioner Mista Sinista and Q-Bert, he is also influenced by other genres as well, such as drum n bass, rock, jazz and soul.

== DJing ==
Merge began to enter DJ battles, and was known for his aggression and technique. Shortly after winning the 2002 ITF US Advancements, Merge was inducted into the respected DJ crew – the 5th Platoon. In 2002, he became active at the Scratch DJ Academy, a DJ school in New York City founded by the late Jam Master Jay. Merge became Head Professor, developing the curriculum now taught in the scratch/juggling class.

=== Championships ===
From 2002 to 2005, Merge won 35 DJ battles. Since 2002, Merge has won 10 national titles and 5 world titles, more titles in 3 years than any other DJ. He has won every prominent US title, becoming America's top DJ in 2003 and 2004 at Guitar Center's annual Spinoff.

==== World Champion ====
He has gained world championship titles in every world DJ competition. Merge won the 2004 2005 DMC World Championship in his 2nd year of participation in the competition, ending a four-year hiatus of American winners. He became the seventh American to wear the DMC World championship crown, after DJ Cheese, Roc Raida, Mix Master Mike, DJ Cash Money, Q-Bert and Craze.

2004 DMC World DJ Championships. The 2004 championships took place on Sunday 5 September 2004 at Carling Apollo Hammersmith, London, United Kingdom.

2005 DMC World DJ Championships. The 2005 championships took place on Monday 26 September 2005 at Hammersmith Palais, London, United Kingdom.
