= Pat Shannahan =

Sample clearance expert (d. 2020)

Pat Shannahan (died 2020) was a sample clearance expert. Shannahan worked with artists such as the Beastie Boys, Janet Jackson, and The Avalanches to research and clear many of the samples used in their music.

== Career ==
Shannahan worked for over 20 years clearing the use of samples for musical artists. Over the course of her career Shannahan worked for RCA, ABC Music, Island Records, and Polygram recording companies. She researched which publishing company or independent artist controls the rights to the music to broker a deal to include the sample in another artists work. One of the earliest albums she worked on was an unnamed Prince Paul release.

The Avalanches album Wildflower contained many samples, all of which were cleared by Shannahan. One of the most difficult songs to clear was "Noisy Eater", as it contained samples of the Beatles song "Come Together".

== Personal life ==
Shannahan lived in Los Angeles, California.

== Discography ==
Year	Artist	Album
1982	Geri Logan	Come and Get It
1994	Raja-Neé	Hot & Ready
1994	Beastie Boys	Ill Communication
1995	Portrait	All That Matters
1995	Hurricane	The Hurra
1996	Beck	Odelay
1997	Raw Breed	Blood, Sweat & Tears
1998	Beastie Boys	Hello Nasty
1999	Ice-T	Seventh Deadly Sin
2000	Dilated Peoples	The Platform
2000	Shaggy	Hot Shot
2000	The Avalanches	Since I Left You
2001	Janet Jackson	All for You
2002	Naam Brigade	Early In The Game
2004	Dilated Peoples	Neighborhood Watch
2011	Rene Lopez	E.L.S.
2013	The Lonely Island	The Wack Album
2016	The Avalanches	Wildflower
2020	The Avalanches	We Will Always Love You
