= DJ Cheese =

American DJ and record producer

- Born: Robert Cheese; Oak Hill, West Virginia, U.S.
- Genres: Hip hop
- Occupations: DJ, record producer
- Instruments: Turntable, Sampler

DJ Cheese (born Robert Cheese) is an American disc jockey and record producer who won the 1986 DMC World Final in London, showcasing the art of scratching in turntablism for the first time. He also appeared in the 1986 UK tour with Run-DMC.

== Early life ==
Cheese was born in Oak Hill, West Virginia. He was raised in Edison, New Jersey and later moved to Plainfield in 1977. In 1980, he was influenced by Grandmaster Flash and began developing an interest in hip hop. At this point, he began purchasing DJ equipment.

== Career ==
In 1984, DJ Cheese won the DJ Battle for World Supremacy at the New Music Seminar, becoming the first non-NYC DJ to win the title. At the seminar, Cheese met and joined Tony Prince in competition, and was later invited by Prince to appear in the inaugural DMC DJ World Championship. Cheese's portion of the competition incorporated scratching, which initiated a different approach to deejay battling.

From 1985-1986, under the label Profile Records, Cheese released two vinyl 12" singles with the group Word Of Mouth entitled Coast to Coast and King Kut. King Kut was used in the coming years as a way of "basing songs around how great your deejay is."

In 1986, Cheese headlined the afternoon and evening performances at London’s "UK Fresh ’86" show at the Wembley Arena. He performed alongside KMC and MC Original G from Word of Mouth. Later that year Cheese collaborated with Fats Comet on the song "Eat The Beat".

After this, Cheese distanced himself from Word of Mouth due to a financial dispute with Profile Records. Since then, he has spent periods of involvement in music, performing with Doug E. Fresh, Slick Rick, Big Daddy Kane, and 50 Cent. In 2013, he reconnected with Word of Mouth to record the single "Life Without Hip Hop".

In recent years, DJ Cheese has continued to be recognized for his pivotal role in the history of turntablism, particularly as the DMC World DJ Championships approached its 40th anniversary in 2025. His 1986 winning performance is frequently cited by the organization as the "turning point" that shifted DJ battles from simple mixing competitions to showcases of technical scratching and turntablism.

As of 2025, DJ Cheese is widely celebrated as a pioneer who introduced scratching as a dominant element in DJ competitions. His 1986 DMC World Championship victory is ranked among the "Top 10 Moments in DMC History," noted for ending the era of disco-mixing and ushering in the hip-hop focused turntablism era.

In the lead-up to the DMC World Finals' 40th anniversary in Tokyo, the organization highlighted his contribution, stating that his innovative use of the crossfader and scratching techniques "changed the DMC format forever."

He remains active in the hip-hop community and maintains a presence on social media platforms. In 2021, he was featured in an extensive interview with Vinyl Esquire, where he reflected on his collaborations with Duke Bootee, his tour with Run-DMC, and the legacy of his track "King Kut."
