= Kireek =

Japanese music duo

- Origin: Japan
- Genres: turntablism
- Years active: c. 2004 to c. 2011
- Members: DJ HI-C, DJ Yasa
- Website: plantrec.com/pg56.html

Kireek is a Japanese turntablist music group formed in 2004 by members DJ HI-C and DJ Yasa. The duo won the team DMC world championship on five occasions from 2007 to 2011. As of 2025 they are the "most decorated Team Champions in DMC history". Their mixing has been the subject of scholarly analysis, in particular their 2011 performance was highlighted as a "strong example of team turntablism". DJ Yasa has also entered the DMC Championship as a solo artist, coming in second place in both 2006 and 2007.
