= Amor y Tacos =

Mexican restaurant in California

- Location within the Los Angeles metropolitan area Amor y Tacos (California) Amor y Tacos (the United States)

Restaurant information
- Established: October 2013
- Owner(s): Thomas Ortega; Todd Tsujioka
- Head chef: Thomas Ortega
- Food type: Mexican
- Rating: Bib Gourmand
- Location: 13333 South St, Cerritos, CA 90703
- Coordinates: 33.8602°N 118.0471°W
- Website: www.amorytacos.com

Amor y Tacos is a Mexican restaurant in Cerritos, California. Founded in 2013, it has been awarded a Bib Gourmand. The Cerritos-native Hip hop DJ crew Beat Junkies plays at the restaurant every Friday night.

== History ==
Thomas Ortega opened Amor y Tacos in October 2013, but it officially debuted on November 4, 2013. The restaurant was a new pursuit by Ortega, who had previously opened other restaurants throughout Southern California, such as Ortega 120 in Redondo Beach. He had also worked with noted chefs Michael Cimarusti and Wolfgang Puck in the past.

DJ Yella and Lil Eazy-E performed at the restaurant in 2014.

== Menu ==
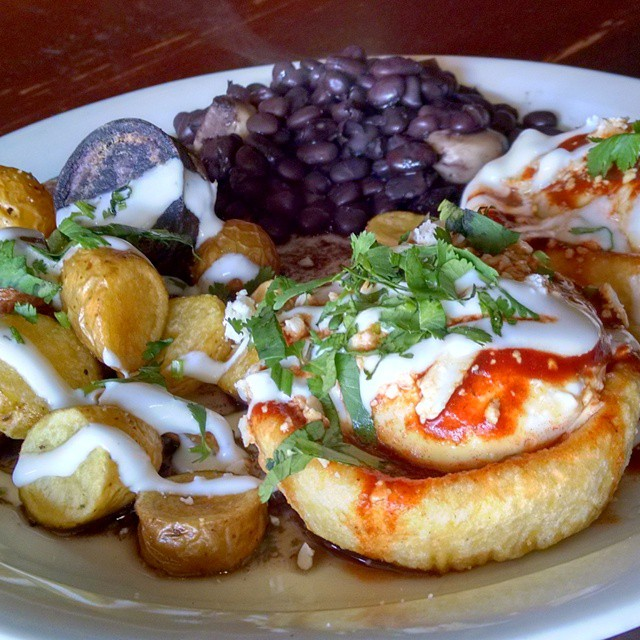
Huevos rancheros at the restaurant

Amor y Tacos serves Mexican, specifically Alta Californian, cuisine. The food is inspired by the head chef's, Thomas Ortega's, Chicano upbringing. Brussels sprouts, Yellowfin tuna tostadas, ceviche, calamari, esquites, chicharrón, mole tots, guacamole, broccolini, taquitos, tortilla soup, sopa de fideo, caesar salad, tacos, and nachos are served as starters. Burritos and quesadillas can be made al pastor or with carne asada, short ribs, carnitas, tinga, shrimp, vegetables, and bean and cheese. The main courses include American Angus strip steak, quesabirria, carnitas in salsa verde, taquitos, pork belly, burgers, chilaquiles, shrimp, pizza, mole, salmon, grilled cheese, and spaghetti. Churros and bread pudding are offered for dessert.
