= The Platform (album) =

Studio album by Dilated Peoples
- Released: May 23, 2000
- Studios: Audio X (Burbank, CA); D&D Studios (New York, NY); Can Am Studios (Tarzana, CA); Threshold Studios (Santa Monica, CA)
- Genre: Hip hop
- Length: 1:04:20
- Label: Capitol
- Producers: Alchemist; DJ Babu; E-Swift; Evidence; Joey Chavez; KutMasta Kurt; T-Ray

Dilated Peoples chronology
The Platform (2000)	Expansion Team (2001)

Singles from The Platform
- 1. "Work the Angles" Released: 1998; 2. "The Platform" Released: February 29, 2000

The Platform is the debut studio album by American hip hop trio Dilated Peoples. It was released on May 23, 2000, through Capitol Records. The recording sessions took place at Audio X in Burbank, D&D Studios in New York, Can Am Studios in Tarzana and Threshold Studios in Santa Monica. The album was produced by members Evidence and DJ Babu, as well as Alchemist, Joey Chavez, E-Swift, KutMasta Kurt, and T-Ray. It features guest appearances from Aceyalone, B-Real, Everlast, and Likwit Crew members Defari, Phil Da Agony, Planet Asia, and tha Alkaholiks. The album represents a movement of several California underground hip hop artists away from the violence and misogyny of gangsta rap, towards a more traditional, conscious form of rap.

The album debuted at number 74 on the Billboard 200 and number 30 on the Top R&B/Hip-Hop Albums in the United States. It also made it to number 89 on the UK Albums Chart and number 14 on the UK Hip Hop and R&B Albums Chart. The title track peaked at number 81 on the UK Singles Chart.

== Critical reception ==
Professional ratings
Aggregate scores
Source	Rating
Metacritic	69/100
Review scores
Source	Rating
AllMusic	4.5/5 stars
Q	3/5 stars
RapReviews	8/10
Rolling Stone	2/5 stars
The Village Voice	(choice cut)

The Platform was met with generally favorable reviews from music critics. At Metacritic, which assigns a normalized rating out of 100 to reviews from mainstream publications, the album received an average score of 69, based on eleven reviews.

AllMusic's Steve Huey praised the album, saying "the most alluring aspect of The Platform is the array of finely-crafted beats". Frank Tope of Q gave the album mixed review: "their debut album sits comfortably between the party-heart, old skool shape-throwing of Jurassic Five and the darker weedscapes of Cypress Hill". Rob Sheffield for Rolling Stone gave the album 2 out of 5 possible stars, saying "Dilated Peoples are still painfully tame on the mike, especially Evidence, who hits a dubious milestone in The Platform by becoming the first rapper ever to utter the words "between you and I". The vocals sink the music: This is the kind of hip-hop album where the MC compares himself to Steve Howe, and while you hope he means the baseball player, you know in your heart he really means the guitarist from Yes". Veteran critic Robert Christgau picked out two songs—"The Platform" and "Triple Optics"—as choice cuts at his Consumer Guide column for The Village Voice.

MTV named the album "one of those timeless long-players, like Run-DMC's Raising Hell or EPMD's Strictly Business, where you'll want to commit every track to memory". CDNow description was "the most alluring aspect of The Platform is the array of finely-crafted beats assembled by Evidence and DJ Premier protégé The Alchemist, which are in turn juggled and sliced at will by the hands of DJ Babu, the oft-forgotten man in the hip-hop equation". Billboard called it "a balanced, lyrically inspiring collection of songs". Nathan Rabin of The A.V. Club wrote that the album "would benefit from greater lyrical diversity, and it suffers from moments of monotony and inertia, but it's a promising debut from a group that should only improve with time". Wall of Sound reviewer found the album "for all its individual strengths, never hits any kind of synergy as an album".

== Track listing ==
No.	Title	Writer(s)	Producer(s)	Length
1.	"So May I Introduce to You"	Michael Perretta	Evidence	0:47
2.	"The Platform"	Perretta; Rakaa Taylor; Alan Maman	The Alchemist	4:37
3.	"No Retreat" (featuring B-Real)	Perretta; Taylor; Louis Freese; Todd Ray	T-Ray	5:21
4.	"Guaranteed"	Perretta; Taylor; Maman	The Alchemist	3:52
5.	"Right On" (featuring Tha Alkaholiks)	Perretta; Taylor; Rico Smith; James Robinson; Eric Brooks	E-Swift	4:56
6.	"The Main Event"	Perretta; Maman; Erick Sermon; Parrish Smith	The Alchemist	2:34
7.	"Service"	Perretta; Taylor; Chris Oroc	DJ Babu	3:16
8.	"Ear Drums Pop"	Perretta; Taylor	Evidence	4:08
9.	"Years in the Making"	Perretta; Joey Chavez	Joey Chavez	3:11
10.	"Annihilation"	Perretta; Taylor; Maman; Phillip Blenman; Tariq Trotter; Karl Jenkins; Kenyatta Williams; Malik Smart; John Sebastian; Mark Sebastian; Steve Boone	The Alchemist	3:58
11.	"Expanding Man"	Perretta; Taylor	Evidence	2:52
12.	"The Last Line of Defense"	Perretta; Maman; Peter Phillips; James Brown	The Alchemist	4:42
13.	"Triple Optics"	Perretta; Taylor; Ben Nickleberry Jr	Evidence; Beni B (co.)	4:14
14.	"The Shape of Things to Come" (featuring Aceyalone)	Perretta; Taylor; Edwin Hayes; Chavez	Evidence; Joey Chavez	5:04
15.	"Work the Angles"	Perretta; Taylor; Kurt Matlin; Stefan Kendal Gordy; Ali Shaheed Muhammad; Jonathan Davis; Malik Taylor	KutMasta Kurt	4:01
16.	"Ear Drums Pop (Remix)" (featuring Planet Asia, Defari, Everlast and Phil Da Agony)	Perretta; Taylor; Jason Green; Duane A. Johnson Jr.; Erik Schrody; Jason Smith; Chavez	Joey Chavez	5:05
Total length:				1:04:20

Sample credits

- Track 6 contains a sample from "Strictly Snappin' Necks" written by Erick Sermon and Parrish Smith as performed by EPMD.
- Track 10 contains an element from "Clones" written by Phillip Blenman, Tariq Trotter, Karl Jenkins, Kenyatta Williams, Malik Smart, John Sebastian, Mark Sebastian and Steve Boone as performed by The Roots.
- Track 12 contains element from "Tru Master" written by Peter Phillips and James Brown as performed by Pete Rock.
- Track 15 contains a portion of "God Lives Through" written by Ali Shaheed Muhammad, Jonathan Davis and Malik Taylor as performed by A Tribe Called Quest.

== Personnel ==
- Michael "Evidence" Peretta – vocals, producer & mixing (tracks: 1, 8, 11, 13, 14), executive producer
- Rakaa "Iriscience" Taylor – vocals, executive producer
- Chris "DJ Babu" Oroc – scratches (tracks: 1–5, 7–11, 13, 14, 16), producer & mixing (track 7), executive producer
- Louis "B-Real" Freese – vocals (track 3)
- Rico "Tash" Smith – vocals (track 5)
- James "J-Ro" Robinson – vocals (track 5)
- Edwin "Aceyalone" Hayes Jr. – vocals (track 14)
- Jason "Planet Asia" Green – vocals (track 16)
- Duane A. "Defari" Johnson Jr. – vocals (track 16)
- Erik "Everlast" Schrody – vocals (track 16)
- Jason "Phil Da Agony" Smith – vocals (track 16)
- Alan "The Alchemist" Maman – scratches (tracks: 6, 12), producer & mixing (tracks: 2, 4, 6, 10, 12)
- Kurt "DJ Revolution" Hoffman – scratches (track 15)
- Todd "T-Ray" Ray – producer (track 3)
- Eric "E-Swift" Brooks – producer (track 5)
- Joey Chavez – producer & mixing (track: 9, 14, 16), recording (tracks: 9, 16)
- "KutMasta Kurt" Matlin – producer & mixing (track 15), engineering (tracks: 4, 6, 13, 15)
- Ben "Beni B" Nickleberry Jr. – co-producer (track 13)
- Sean Freehill – engineering (tracks: 1, 5, 7, 8, 11, 14), recording (tracks: 9, 10, 16), mixing (tracks: 9, 16)
- Kieran Walsh – engineering (tracks: 2, 10)
- Anton Pukshansky – mixing (track 3)
- Djinji Brown – engineering (track 12)
- Jesse "Biz" Stewart – recording (track 14)
- Tom Coyne – mastering
- Brent Rollins – art direction, design
- Brian "B+" Cross – photography
- Block – photography
- Pat Shannahan – sample clearance

== Charts ==
Chart (2000)	Peak position
UK Albums (Official Charts)	89
UK R&B Albums (Official Charts)	14
US Billboard 200	74
US Top R&B/Hip-Hop Albums (Billboard)	30
