= DJ Rhettmatic =

American disc jockey (born 1969)

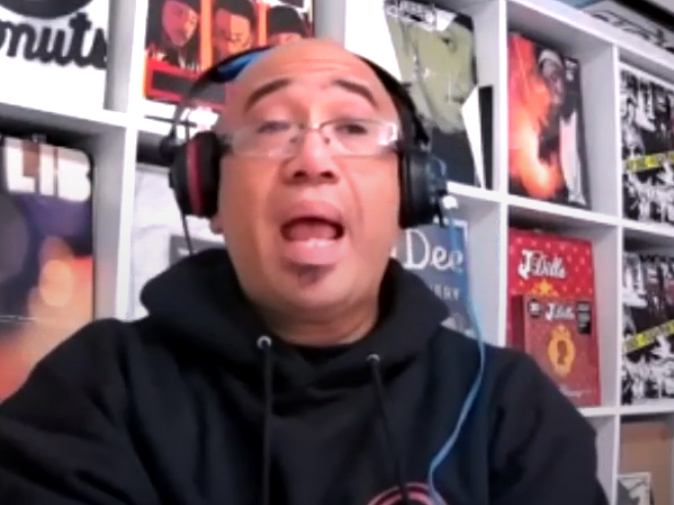
- DJ Rhettmatic in 2021

Background information
- Born: Nazareth Nirza; May 10, 1969 (age 57)
- Origin: California, U.S.
- Occupations: Disc jockey; record producer
- Label: Up Above Records
- Member of: Beat Junkies; Visionaries; Kozmonautz

DJ Rhettmatic (born Nazareth Nirza; May 10, 1969) is a record producer, disc jockey and member of the groups Beat Junkies and Visionaries.

== Career ==
Rhettmatic began his DJ career in 1983, with Double Platinum, a DJ group based out of Cerritos, CA. Rhettmatic highly acknowledges fellow Beat Junkie member, DJ Curse, as his leading mentor. As Curse shared his turntable exhibition, involving scratches and other DJ techniques, Rhettmatic's interest in DJing formed, allowing him to take hold of his musical passion. Rhettmatic claimed the titles of Disco Mix Club (DMC) West Coast Champion (1996) and International Turntablist Federation (ITF) 2x Team World Champion (1997/1998).

In 1995, Rhettmatic and Key-Kool were "first Asian-Americans to release a hip-hop record" titled Kozmonautz, which also featured the first official song by the LA based underground hip-hop supergroup that Rhettmatic also helped found in 1994 and is the DJ/producer for, the Visionaries.

He has worked with many in the hip-hop community, from the likes of Peanut Butter Wolf, Talib Kweli, Madlib, DJ Premier, Cypress Hill, Mayer Hawthorne and Adrian Younge. His musical masterpieces include "E=MC5" by KeyKool & Rhettmatic featuring Ras Kass, LMNO, Voodoo and Meen Green, and "From the Ground Up" b/w "Ubiquity" by The Associates featuring LMNO & KeyKool of the Visionaries, Rakaa Iriscience & Evidence of Dilated Peoples, and Divine Styler.

In December 2005, Rhettmatic was J Dilla's tour show DJ in Europe, for his last tour ever, along with Frank n Dank and Phat Kat. Rhettmatic has also worked with and done production and scratches for Talib Kweli, OhNo, M.E.D., Aloe Blacc (Stones Throw), Prince Po (Organized Konfusion), RBX (The Dogg Pound), Noelle Scaggs of Fitz & the Tantrums and New York hip-hop supergroup The Brown Bag AllStars, as well as having made mixtapes and podcast mixes for Ghostface Killah, Guilty Simpson and Stones Throw Records.

His most recent projects include the Crown Royale album with Michigan's wordsmith Buff1, a DJ/percussionist show/mixtape project with Eric Bobo of Cypress Hill and a joint project with legendary Californian MC, Ras Kass called 'A.D.I.D.A.S.'

Rhettmatic currently hosts Beat Junkie Radio on Dash Radio.

== Discography ==
- Kozmonautz (with Key-Kool) (1995)
- World Famous Beat Junkies Vol 2. - DJ Rhettmatic (with the Beat Junkies) (1999)
- Exclusive Collection (2004)
- Crown Royale (with Buff1) (2010)
