= Tony Prince =

British DJ

- Born: Thomas Whitehead; 9 May 1944 (age 82); Oldham, Lancashire, England
- Other name: The Royal Ruler
- Occupations: Radio DJ, programme manager, businessman, writer
- Years active: 1962–present
- Spouse: Christine Hall (m. 1970)

Tony Prince (born Thomas Whitehead; 9 May 1944) is a British radio disc jockey and businessman. He broadcast on Radio Caroline and Radio Luxembourg in the 1960s and 1970s, later becoming a programme director and then businessman.

He was responsible for establishing the remix label DMC.

== Biography ==
=== Early life and DJ work ===
Born in Oldham, Lancashire, the only son of a scrap metal worker, he attended Oldham Art School and worked as a jockey, TV salesman and toolmaker before becoming lead singer in a local band, The Jasons, in 1959.

In 1962, he started as a club DJ at the 'Astoria Ballroom' on King Street, Oldham. He introduced the Beatles onstage on the night that they first reached number one on the British charts in 1963 with "From Me to You". He was expelled from the Musicians' Union in 1964 for playing records in dancehalls rather than employing live musicians, and then moved to Bristol to work for Top Rank. He presented an early ITV pop music programme, Discs-a-Gogo.

In 1965, having worked with DJ Tony Blackburn at Discs-a-Gogo and auditioning for the pirate radio station Radio Caroline North on a ship in the Irish Sea, he joined the station, developing his personality as "your royal ruler".

=== Radio Luxembourg and DJ work in Europe ===
After the Marine Broadcasting Offences Act 1967, which came into effect in August 1967, banned pirate radio, he joined Radio Luxembourg.

In 1970, Prince embarked on a tour of Czechoslovakia doing three shows in Brno, Karlovy and Prague. He also made discotheque appearances throughout Europe and the music he played had an important influence on the younger generation of people who, in certain European countries, only had access to the music by listening to him on Radio Luxembourg, broadcast on 208 Metres Medium Wave, in previous years but had no access to seeing the groups play live.

He became president of the International Elvis Presley Fan Club, interviewed Presley in 1972 and 1973, and played Presley songs non-stop following the singer's death in 1977. He continued to present programmes after becoming programme director at Radio Luxembourg in 1977. He was programme director until 1984, changing the station's format, for a time, to play predominantly disco and soul music.

=== Return to the United Kingdom, TV work and projects ===
Around 1981, he began playing DJ mixes of dance records and started the successful and influential Disco Mix Club Show. On returning to Britain, he launched DMC as a record subscription club in 1983. He also launched the club culture magazine Mixmag, later sold to EMAP. Prince continued to run the company, now known as DMC International, until 2006. In 2002, Prince established World DJ Day, set up to raise funds for Nordoff–Robbins music therapy.

His later projects have included Wedding TV, which he co-founded. The channel (available on Sky Digital) won the "Best Specialist Channel" award at the annual Broadcast Digital Channel Awards in 2008. In 2016, he published a double autobiography co-written with Czech music fan Jan Šesták, The Royal Ruler & the Railway DJ.

In 2018, Prince co-founded a radio station, United DJs, with other broadcasting personalities including Mike Read, Emperor Rosko, David Hamilton, Dave Lee Travis and David Jensen. On 23 May 2021, United DJs ceased broadcasting after three years with Prince stating, "...we have been unable to attract enough listeners to make the station commercially viable".

== Personal life ==
In 1970, aged 26, Prince married Christine Hall from Derker at Oldham Register Office. He now lives in Bray, Berkshire.
