= Beat Junkies =

American hip hop group

- Origin: Cerritos, California, U.S.
- Genres: Hip hop, turntablism
- Years active: 1992–present
- Label: Beat Junkie Sound
- Members: DJ Babu; J Rocc; D-Styles; DJ Rhettmatic; DJ What?! Mr. Choc; Icy Ice; Curse; DJ Shortkut; Melo-D; DJ Havik
- Website: www.beatjunkies.com

The Beat Junkies is an American hip hop crew of DJs specializing in turntablism.

Established in 1992 in Cerritos, California by J. Rocc. As of 2014, The Beat Junkie Crew also host their own record pool, clothing line and radio station. The Beat Junkies opened their own DJ school in April 2017, located in Glendale. In January 2018, they announced plans to go online and launch beatjunkies.tv.

The Beat Junkies have won prestigious DJ battles and competitions like the DMC, the Supermen, and International Turntablists Federation competitions and going to world tour exhibitions. They have traveled and performed across the United States as well as Japan, Germany, The Netherlands and Canada. The Beat Junkies as a crew and individually have also featured in many other acts alongside artists such as Jurassic 5, the Visionaries, the Likwit Junkies with Defari, Phil Da Agony, Cypress Hill, Invisibl Skratch Piklz, Dilated Peoples, and Peanut Butter Wolf who was so influenced by the Beat Junkies that he recruited Homeless Derelicts who were featured on Beat Junkies Vol.1 and released them as the second ever Stones Throw Records release.

The Beat Junkies play at Amor y Tacos in Cerritos every Friday night.

== History ==
The group was established in 1992 by J. Rocc. The original members included Curse, DJ Rhettmatic, Melo-D, Icy Ice, Symphony, & What?!. Shortkut, D-Styles, Havik, and Tommy Gun (who joined in late 1992) were later added. DJ Babu joined the Junkies by late 1993; the newest member is currently Mr. Choc, who was added to the crew in early 1996.

The BeatJunkies have launched their own membership based record pool in the spring of 2014, curated by members of the crew, which provides exclusive cuts and edits at www.beatjunkies.com.

Following the launch of the record pool, the Beat Junkies clothing line also was set into motion late 2014, which aimed at music lovers and enthusiasts alike. Celebrity influencers such as comedian Russell Peters, Chef Roy Choi, Radio Personality Rikki Martinez a.k.a. Letty, and artist AntiGirl have been featured in the 2014 Beat Junkie lookbook.

At the top of 2015, "Beat Junkie Radio" began airing on Dash Radio. The station is curated and hosted by members DJ Babu, Mr. Choc and Rhetmattic. Their live show "Soundcheck" goes on air every 2nd and 4th Tuesdays of each month from 7-10pm, live sets are provided by select members of The Beat Junkie crew, and a variety of musical guests such as Egyptian Lover, Hitboy, Dom Kennedy, Anderson Paak, Knxwledge, The Alchemist and many more have been featured.

In celebration of 25 years, the Beat Junkies have opened up their own DJ school in 2017 - the Beat Junkie Institute of Sound. Located in Glendale, California, the Beat Junkie Institute of Sound offers fundamental and specialized DJ courses, workshops, private instruction, and an opportunity to join their community and learn the art form of DJing "Beat Junkie Style". Their philosophy on teaching is not bound by genre, music style, or technology. They authentically approach DJing as a discipline, a fine art, a passion. Placing a strong emphasis on the fact that there are mechanics, techniques, and history that one must study and master to earn the title of DJ.

== Discography ==
- The World Famous Beat Junkies Volume 1 (1997)
- The World Famous Beat Junkies Volume 2 (1998)
- Rock S*** (1998) Label: Contaminated
- The World Famous Beat Junkies Volume 3 (1999)
- Changes/Materialize (1999), Second Movement
- Classic Material Volume One (2001)
- Sick Days (12") (2001)
- Dividends, DJ Rhettmatic (2004)

=== Videos ===
- Private Stash (2003) (DVD)
- D-Styles featuring the Beat Junkies - A Night at the Knitting Factory (2004)

=== Album appearances ===
- Sound Bombing II, JRocc and Babu (Rawkus Records) (1999)
- Rah Rah Various - O.L.C. (1999, 2001)
- SUP the Chemist - Dust (2000) ("Here" DJ Melo-D)
- Scratch Monopoly (2001)
- Various - The Return of the DJ - Allstar Album (2001)
- LA-Japan Connection, DJ Yutaka - United Nations II (2001)
