= Krondon =

American actor (born 1976)

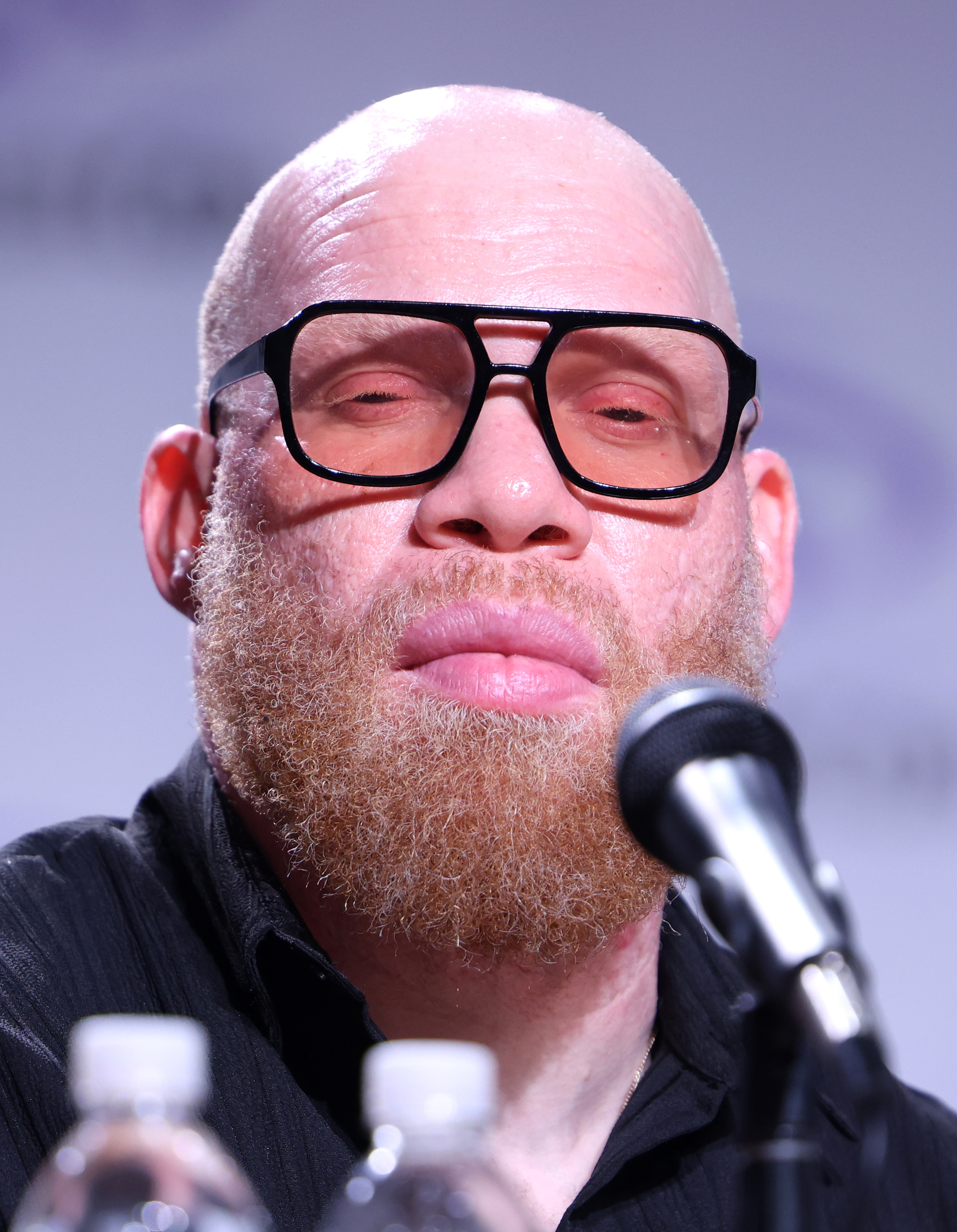
- Krondon in 2025
- Born: Marvin Jones III; July 9, 1976 (age 50); Los Angeles, California, U.S.
- Occupations: Actor; rapper; songwriter
- Years active: 2003–present
- Musical career
- Genre: Hip hop
- Label: Blacksmith Records

Marvin Jones III (born July 9, 1976), also known as Krondon, is an American actor and rapper from Los Angeles, California. He is a member of the group Strong Arm Steady, along with Phil Da Agony and Mitchy Slick.

As an actor, Jones is known primarily for playing albino supervillains, including Tobias Whale in The CW series Black Lightning (2018–2021), and portraying Tombstone in the animated film Spider-Man: Into the Spider-Verse (2018) and the live-action Marvel Cinematic Universe film Spider-Man: Brand New Day (2026); he’ll reprise the role in the animated Spider-Verse sequel Spider-Man: Beyond the Spider-Verse (2027).

== Early life ==
Jones grew up in South Central, Los Angeles. He has albinism.

== Career ==
=== Music career ===
Strong Arm Steady formed in 2003, and released its debut album Deep Hearted in 2007 followed by the mixtape Gang Mentality, the conceptual album In Search of Stoney Jackson and their most recent installment, Arms & Hammers.

Krondon's debut album, Everything’s Nothing, came out in 2013.

Krondon collaborated with Shafiq Husayn (Sa-Ra Creative Partners) under the group name White Boiz, releasing the 2015 album Neighborhood Wonderful on Stones Throw Records.

Krondon also ghostwrites for other rappers, such as Snoop Dogg, Dr. Dre, and Xzibit.

== Filmography ==
Key
†	Denotes films that have not yet been released

=== Film ===
List of performances in film
Year	Title	Role	Notes	Ref.
2013	Our Vinyl Weighs a Ton: This Is Stones Throw Records	Himself	Documentary film	
2018	Spider-Man: Into the Spider-Verse	Lonnie Lincoln / Tombstone	Voice role	
2025	Shadow Force	Cysgod		
2026	Campeón Gabacho			
2026	Spider-Man: Brand New Day	Lonnie Lincoln / Tombstone		
2027	Spider-Man: Beyond the Spider-Verse †	Lonnie Lincoln / Tombstone	Voice role; In production	

=== Television ===
List of performances on television
Year	Title	Role	Notes	Ref.
2011	Harry's Law	Castor Mukasa	Episode: "American Dreams"	
2018–21	Black Lightning	Tobias Whale	Main role; 58 episodes	
2020	Into the Dark	Orderly	Episode: "The Current Occupant"	
2024	Halo	Louis-036	Recurring role; 3 episodes	
2024	The Equalizer	Clay	Episode: "Blind Justice"	

== Discography ==
=== With Strong Arm Steady ===
- 2007: Deep Hearted
- 2010: In Search of Stoney Jackson
- 2011: Arms & Hammers
- 2012: Members Only EP
- 2012: Stereo Type (EP) (with Statik Selektah)
- 2012: Stereo Jr (EP) (with Oh No)

=== Solo Discography ===
- 2003: Strong Arm Steady Presents... Krondon – Black Goldmember Vol. 1
- 2003: Black Goldmember Vol. 2
- 2010: Let 'Em Live
- 2013: Everything's Nothing
- 2015: Green In Gold (EP) (with Chase N. Cashe)

=== With Shafiq Husayn (White Boiz) ===
- 2015: Neighborhood Wonderful
