= DMC World DJ Championships =

Turntablism world championship competition

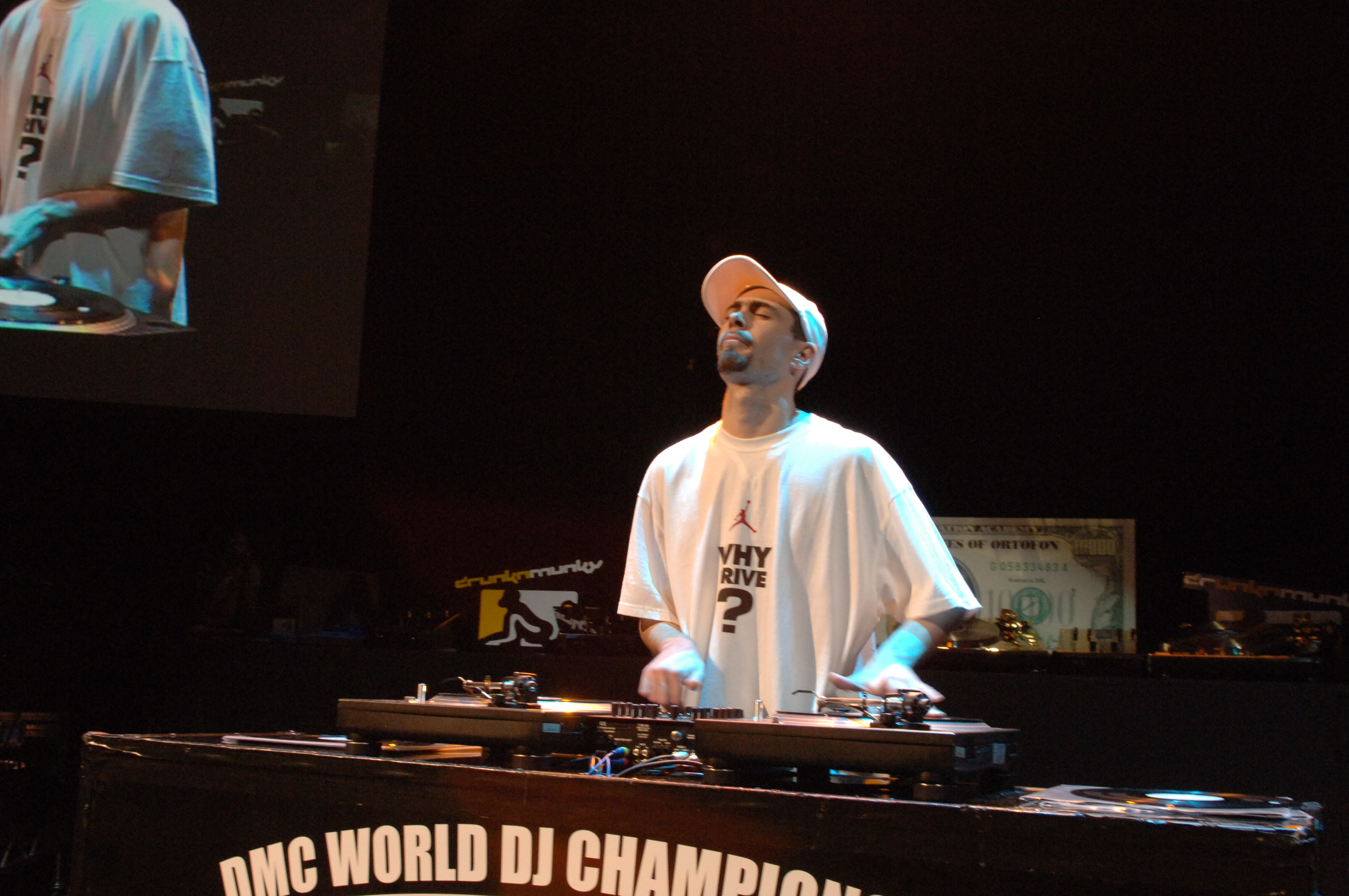
- DJ Fly at the DMC championships in 2008
- Genre: Hip hop, Turntablism
- Location: Various
- Years active: 1985–present
- Founders: Disco Mix Club
- Website: www.dmcdjchamps.com

The DMC World DJ Championships is an annual DJ competition founded by the Disco Mix Club (DMC) which began in 1985. It has been described as a "pre-eminent competitive DJ event". The competition was forced to go entirely online from 2020 to 2022 due to the COVID-19 pandemic. Since 2023, each championship has been held in a different country, including in Paris in 2024 and in Tokyo in 2025.

== History ==
=== Disco Mix Club ===
The competition was founded in 1985 by the Disco Mix Club. The club was founded by Tony Prince in 1983 as a DJ remix label which targeted professional disc jockeys and enthusiasts instead of the mass market. It resold megamixes and remixes, and published a weekly magazine. The company also began the magazine Mixmag before it was sold to the British media group EMAP in January 1997. Musicians who contributed megamixes to the company included Alan Coulthard, Les Adams (who was a judge on some of the earlier DMC championships), Chad Jackson, Dave Seaman, Steve Anderson, Peter Slaghuis, Paul Dakeyne, and Ben Liebrand.

The club founded the world championship event "for DJs to test their skills against their peers". The Disco Mix Club itself went into voluntary liquidation in April 2023.

=== Competition ===
Competitors are each given 6 minutes to perform, with winners selected at the end. Championships were sponsored internationally by Technics, but in 2010 Technics was replaced by Serato and Rane. Since 2011, the vinyl emulation software Serato Scratch Live can be used during the competition in addition to traditional vinyl.

=== Championship ===
The first championship, held in the London Hippodrome in 1985, was won by Londoner Roger Johnson. From 1992 to 1994 American DJ Qbert dominated the competition, until being asked to step down in order to "level the playing field".

The team DMC championship, in which groups of 2 to 4 DJs compete, was dominated from 2007 to 2011 by Japanese duo Kireek who won 5 consecutive competitions. In 2017 the Bronx-born Puerto Rican DJ Perly became the first woman to win the DMC United States finals. She went on to earn fourth place in the world finals in London later that year, the highest-placing female to that date.

In 2020 and 2021, the tournament was held online due to the COVID-19 pandemic. The 2021 event also attracted media attention due to one of the competitors being a 9-year-old girl from Dubai.

Kalib Strickland from New Zealand, under the name DJ K-Swizz, won both the 2022 and the 2023 world events. Strickland, who had previously at age 14 won both the DMC Battle for World Supremacy and the 2017 IDA Technical to become the youngest person to win a world championship, was the first winner from the Southern hemisphere. He also won the 2018 DMC Battle for Global Supremacy, which he failed to defend in 2019 when he was beaten by DJ Matsunaga in what Mixmag has described as one of the "best DJ scratch battles".

=== Champions ===
- 1985 - Roger Johnson aka RJ Scratch (UK)
- 1986 - DJ Cheese (USA)
- 1987 - Chad Jackson (UK)
- 1988 - DJ Cash Money (USA)
- 1989 - Cutmaster Swift (UK)
- 1990 - DJ David (Germany)
- 1991 - DJ David (Germany)
- 1992 - The Rocksteady DJs (USA)
- 1993 & 1994 - The Dream Team (USA; Rocksteady DJs after departure of Apollo)
- 1995 - DJ Roc Raida (USA)
- 1996 - DJ Noize (Denmark)
- 1997 - A-Trak (Canada)
- 1998 - DJ Craze (USA)
- 1999 - DJ Craze (USA)
- 2000 - DJ Craze (USA)
- 2001 - DJ Plus One (UK)
- 2002 - DJ Kentaro (Japan)
- 2003 - DJ Dopey (Canada)
- 2004 - ie.Merg (USA)
- 2005 - ie.Merg (USA)
- 2006 - DJ Netik (France)
- 2007 - DJ Rafik (Germany)
- 2008 - DJ Fly (France)
- 2009 - DJ Shiftee (USA)
- 2010 - DJ LigOne (France)
- 2011 - Chris Karns aka DJ Vajra (USA)
- 2012 - DJ Izoh (Japan)
- 2013 - DJ Fly (France)
- 2014 - Mr Switch (UK)
- 2015 - DJ Vekked (Canada)
- 2016 - DJ Yuto (Japan)
- 2017 - DJ Rena (Japan)
- 2018 - DJ Skillz (France)
- 2019 - DJ Skillz (France)
- 2020 - DJ Skillz (France)
- 2021 - JFB (UK)
- 2022 - DJ K-Swizz (New Zealand)
- 2023 - DJ K-Swizz (New Zealand)
- 2024 - DJ Fly (France)
- 2025 - DJ Fummy (Japan)
- 2026 - TheKidRC3 (USA)

== See also ==
- List of hip hop music festivals
- List of electronic music festivals
- Live electronic music
- International Turntablist Federation
