= Dilated Peoples =

American hip-hop group

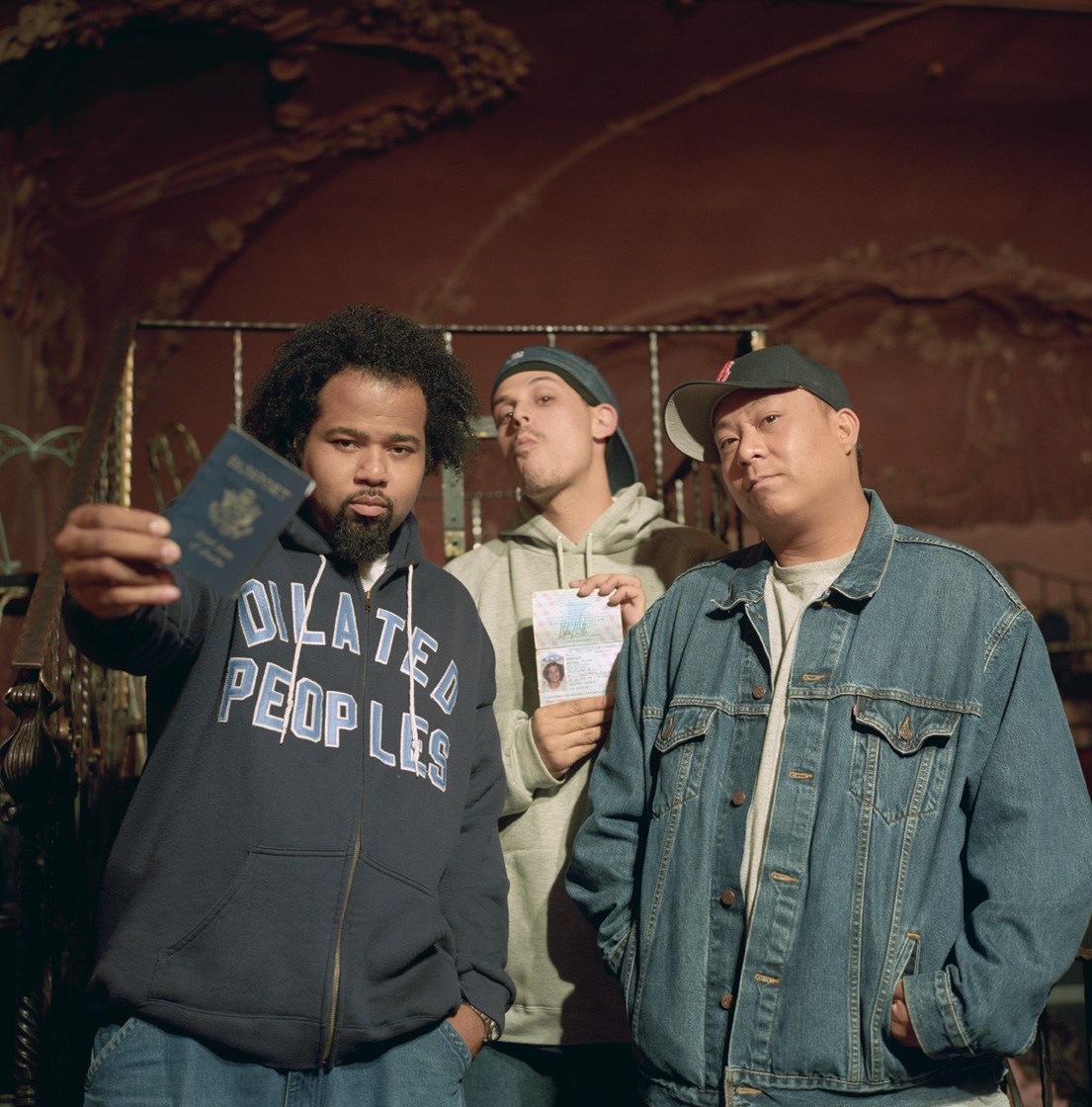
- Dilated Peoples in 2001

Background information
- Origin: Los Angeles, California, U.S.
- Genre: Hip-hop
- Years active: 1992–2017, 2022–present
- Labels: Capitol; EMI; Expansion Team; ABB; Decon; Rhymesayers
- Spinoff of: Step Brothers
- Members: DJ Babu; Rakaa Iriscience; Evidence
- Website: dilatedpeoples.com

Dilated Peoples is an American Los Angeles-based hip-hop trio, composed of rapper and record producer Evidence, rapper Rakaa, and Beat Junkies deejay and record producer DJ Babu. The group is better known in the UK, where they reached the Top 40 of the UK Singles Chart with two tracks, "This Way" and "Worst Comes to Worst". Their songs were featured in the 2003 video games Need for Speed: Underground and NBA Street Vol. 2, as well as MLB 06: The Show.

== History ==
Dilated Peoples was formed in 1992 by DJ Babu (from the DJ crew Beat Junkies), Evidence, and Rakaa. They released "Third Degree" in 1997 on ABB Records, developing their material in the underground hip-hop community. They had previously recorded an album titled Imagery, Battle Hymns & Political Poetry (1995) that was never released, although many fans still have it on bootlegged tapes. The group eventually signed with Capitol Records and released The Platform (2000).

The second album, Expansion Team, was released in 2001 led by the Alchemist–produced "Worst Comes to Worst," which utilized a vocal sample from Mobb Deep's "Survival of the Fittest" and a musical sample from William Bell's "I Forgot to be Your Lover". Expansion Team debuted at number 8 on the US Billboard R&B Albums chart and number 36 on the Billboard 200. The music video for Worst Comes to Worst includes a shot recorded at the World Trade Center on September 7th, 2001, four days before the 9/11 terrorist attacks in which the group used a World Trade Center office worker on their lunch break as a character in the scene. The identity and fate of the individual remains unknown.

The group's third album, Neighborhood Watch, was released in 2004 and debuted at number 55 on the Billboard 200, selling 143,000 copies in the United States. In addition to the Kanye West-produced single, "This Way," it featured the singles "Who's Who?" and "Sorry? OK", which were also included as tracks on the Need for Speed: Underground and SSX 3 soundtracks, and peaked at number 35 on the UK Singles Chart. The fourth album, 20/20, was released in 2006; the debut single, "Back Again", was featured on the Fight Night Round 3 soundtrack. This is the third EA Games soundtrack on which the group has been featured. "Back Again" is also featured on Sony's MLB 06: The Show. In 2012, they collaborated with PlatinumGames to record the track "This is Madness" for the credits of the beat-'em-up video game, Anarchy Reigns. 20/20 was the group's "farewell" album on Capitol Records, ending a four album recording contract. They also work with the underground hip-hop group, Global Warning, who originated in Anaheim.

Dilated Peoples are affiliated with fellow West Coast hip-hop collective the Likwit Crew. Tha Alkaholiks appeared on The Platform on the track "Right On" and Expansion Team on "Heavy Rotation". The group also collaborated frequently with West Coast emcees Defari and Amad Jamal and helped to launch their careers. Defari made one appearance on each Dilated Peoples' album: "Ear Drums Pop (Remix)" on The Platform; "Defari Interlude" on Expansion Team; "Closed Session" on Neighborhood Watch; and "Olde English" on 20/20. Dilated Peoples also made multiple appearances on Defari's album Odds & Evens. Another Dilated associate is their long-time producer, the Alchemist, who produced five songs on The Platform, three songs on Expansion Team, four songs on Neighborhood Watch, and two songs on 20/20. Dilated Peoples were featured on a song on the Alchemists' 1st Infantry album. Rakaa has also made guest appearances on the songs "Trance Fat" on Looptroop's album, Good Things, "Zet 't Blauw" from Dutch rapper Jerome XL's album, De laatste dag and "Memory Fades" on St. Cule's album, American Beef.

== Discography ==
=== Studio albums ===
Year	Album	Peak chart positions				Certifications
Year	Album	US	US R&B	SWI	UK	Certifications
2000	The Platform: Released: May 23, 2000; Label: Capitol; Format: CD, Cassette, LP	74	30	—	89	
2001	Expansion Team: Released: October 23, 2001; Label: Capitol; Format: CD, LP	36	8	—	55	BPI: Silver
2004	Neighborhood Watch: Released: April 6, 2004; Label: Capitol; Format: CD, LP, digital download	55	16	91	96	
2006	20/20: Released: February 21, 2006; Label: Capitol; Format: CD, LP, digital download	97	35	56	107	
2014	Directors of Photography: Released: August 12, 2014; Label: Rhymesayers; Format: CD, LP, digital download	41	9	19	—	
"—" denotes releases that did not chart.

=== DVDs ===
Year	DVD
2007	The Release Party: Released: July 31, 2007; Label: Decon Records

=== Singles ===
Year	Song	Chart positions				Album
Year	Song	US	US R&B	US Rap	UK	Album
1997	"Third Degree" (featuring Defari)	—	—	—	—	non-album single
1998	"Work the Angles"	—	—	—	—	The Platform
2000	"No Retreat" (featuring B-Real)	—	—	42	—	The Platform
2000	"The Platform"	—	—	22	89	The Platform
2001	"Worst Comes to Worst" (featuring Guru)	—	84	—	29	Expansion Team
2002	"Downtown"	—	—	—	—	One Big Trip
2004	"This Way" (featuring Kanye West)	78	41	22	35	Neighborhood Watch
2004	"Love & War"	—	—	—	—	Neighborhood Watch
2005	"Back Again"	—	114	—	98	20/20
2006	"You Can't Hide, You Can't Run"	—	—	—	—	20/20
2007	"Spit It Clearly"	—	—	—	—	The Release Party
2014	"Good As Gone"	—	—	—	—	Directors of Photography
2014	"Show Me the Way" (featuring Aloe Blacc)	—	—	—	—	Directors of Photography

=== Guest appearances ===
Title	Year	Other performer(s)	Album
"Major League"	1998	Rasco, Defari	Time Waits for No Man
"Counter Parts"	1999	Swollen Members	Balance
"Rework the Angles"	1999	Sway & King Tech, A.G., Defari, Xzibit	This or That
"Soundbombing"	1999	Tash	Soundbombing II
"Long Awaited"	1999	Lootpack	Soundpieces: Da Antidote
"Right & Exact"	2000	—N/a	Lyricist Lounge 2
"Suckers Are Hiding"	2000	DJ Muggs	Soul Assassins 2
"Analyze da Operation"	2002	Phil da Agony	—N/a
"Center of Attention"	2002	Pep Love & Souls of Mischeif	Duck Season Vol. 1
"Thieves"	2003	The Alchemist, Prodigy	The Cutting Room Floor
"Behold My Life (Remix)"	2003	Defari	Odds & Evens
"The Craft"	2003	Noelle	—N/a
"For the Record"	2004	The Alchemist	1st Infantry
"No Brainer"	2004	Mr. Complex	Twisted Mister
"Live from Master Control, Pt. 2"	2005	Da Beatminerz, Chali 2na, Wordsworth	Fully Loaded w/ Statik
"Clowns"	2006	Defari	Street Music
"Dilated Agents"	2006	Planet Asia, Rasco	The Medicine
"Another X-Ecution"	2007	Roc Raida	Beats, Cuts and Skits
"Co-Operation"	2007	Strong Arm Steady	Deep Hearted
"Mr. SLow FLow (Remix)	2007	PMD	Mr. Slow Flow
"Yellow & Grey (Remix)"	2009	Notes to Self	A Shot in the Dark
"I Am (Remix)"	2009	Bekay	Hunger Pains
"Believe That"	2010	Amad Jamal	Barely Hanging On: The Chronicles of a Brotha Like Rodney King
"Three Story Building"	2010	Copywrite	The Life and Times of Peter Nelson
"Canada 3000"	2011	Swollen Members	1997
"Battlaxe"	2012	Madchild, Bishop Lamont, D-Sisive	Dope Sick
"Back for You"	2014	Statik Selektah	What Goes Around
"The Kingdom That Worshipped the Dead"	2015	Jedi Mind Tricks	The Thief and the Fallen
"1st (Remix)"	2016	Torii Wolf	—N/a
"Way Ahead"	2016	Snowgoons	Goon Bap
"Happiness"	2020	Master Fuol	My Life (Revised)
