= DJ Babu =

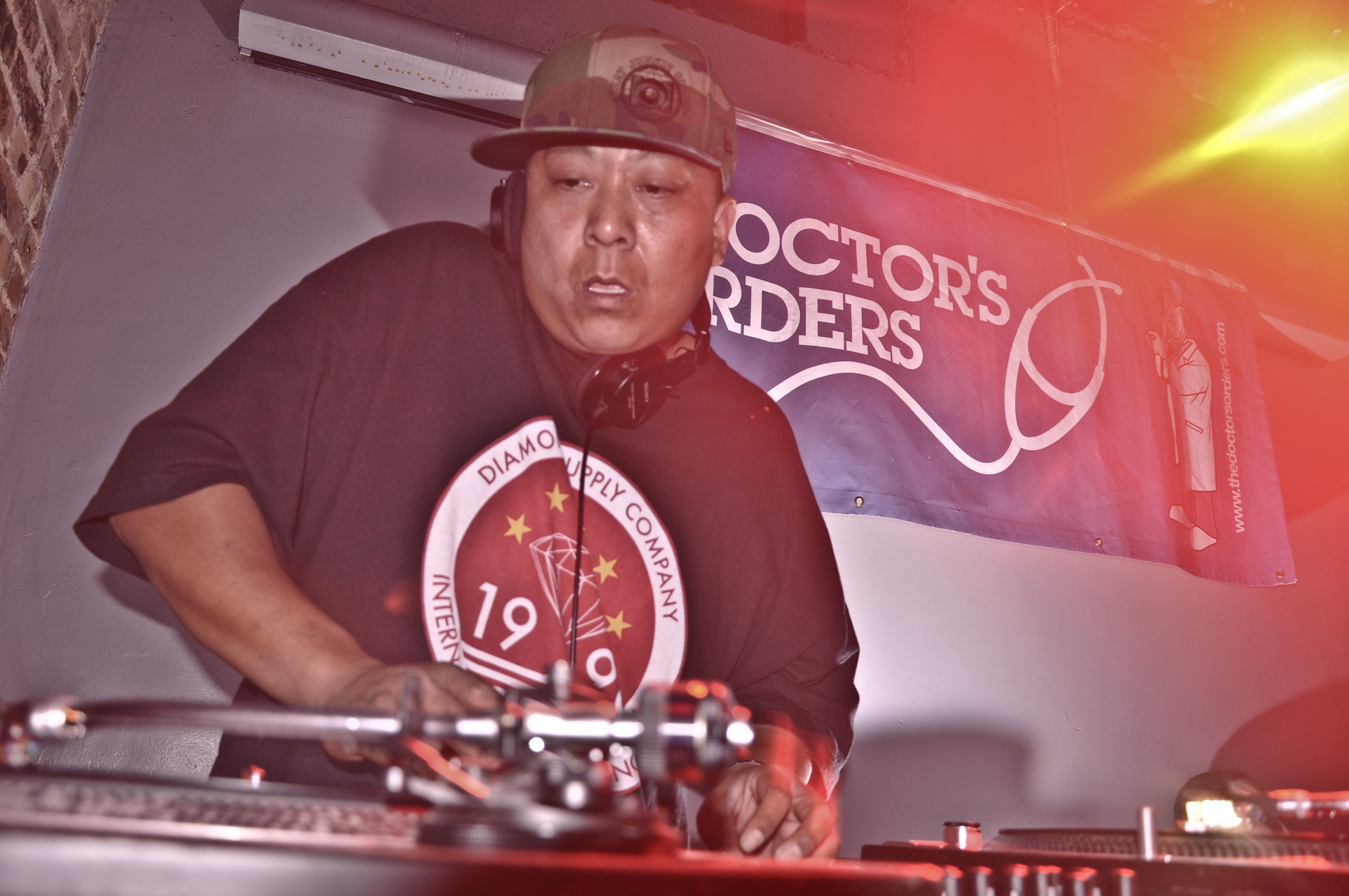
- DJ Babu performing in 2010

Background information
- Also known as: Melvin Babu; MLVN; Babu; The Turntablist; The Dilated Junkie; Babs
- Born: Christopher E. Oroc; September 17, 1974 (age 52); Washington, D.C.
- Genre: Hip-hop
- Occupations: DJ; record producer; songwriter; educator; program director at BJIOS; adjunct faculty at Peabody Institute
- Instrument: Turntables
- Years active: 1992–present
- Labels: Stones Throw; Nature Sounds
- Member of: Beat Junkies; Dilated Peoples; Likwit Junkies
- Website: Dilated Peoples

Christopher E. Oroc (born September 17, 1974), better known as DJ Babu, is a Filipino-American DJ, record producer, turntablist, and educator. He is a member of the world-renowned DJ crew the Beat Junkies, the Los Angeles–based hip-hop trio Dilated Peoples, and the duo Likwit Junkies with rapper Defari.

Babu is widely credited with coining the term "turntablist" to describe DJs who approach the turntable as a musical instrument. He has been referred to by the DMC World DJ Championships as the "godfather of turntablism" due to his influence on competitive DJing and technical innovation.

As of 2017, Babu is the co-founder and Program Director of the Beat Junkie Institute of Sound (BJIOS), a DJ school and professional training facility in Los Angeles. In 2025, he joined the Peabody Institute of the Johns Hopkins University as a member of its Hip Hop Studies faculty, where he teaches DJing and turntable performance at the conservatory level.

== Career ==
Babu spent part of his childhood in Oxnard, California before moving to nearby Camarillo and later settling in Los Angeles County.

He rose to prominence in the 1990s as a competitive turntablist, earning numerous international DJ titles. In 1997, he redefined the art of beat juggling with his influential "Blind Alley" routine during the International Turntablist Federation (ITF) World Championships, where he won titles in both beat juggling and scratching.

Under the alias The Turntablist, Babu released the influential battle record Super Duck Breaks (1996), which became a widely used tool in DJ competitions and sold over 10,000 copies.

With Evidence and Rakaa he formed Dilated Peoples, releasing their first single "Third Degree" in 1997 via ABB Records and their debut studio album The Platform in 2000. He also appeared on "H! Vltg3" from Linkin Park’s remix album Reanimation (2002).

Throughout his career, Babu has collaborated with numerous artists, including MF Doom, Jurassic 5, Swollen Members, and Visionaries. His work with the Likwit Crew led to forming Likwit Junkies with Defari, releasing The L.J.'s in 2005 to favorable reviews.

In 2014, Dilated Peoples released Directors of Photography through Rhymesayers Entertainment, featuring production by Babu and Evidence and appearances from Vince Staples, Aloe Blacc, Action Bronson, Sick Jacken, and Rapsody.

The Beat Junkies launched their digital record pool in 2014 and debuted Beat Junkie Radio on Dash Radio in 2015, with Babu co-hosting the station’s flagship show Soundcheck.

=== MLVN ===
Babu releases instrumental work under the alias MLVN, producing beat tapes and sample-based compositions that reflect his evolution as a producer.

=== Beat Junkie Institute of Sound ===
On January 18, 2017, the Beat Junkies opened the Beat Junkie Institute of Sound, a DJ school offering structured courses in mixing, scratching, beat juggling, and DJ musicianship, where Babu serves as Program Director.

== Accolades ==
- **DMC ICON inductee (2025)**
- Multiple-time **International Turntablist Federation (ITF) World Champion** (Beat Juggling and Scratching, 1997)
- **Vestax World DJ Champion**
- Credited with coining the term **“turntablist”**, influencing academic and cultural recognition of DJing
- Recognized by DMC as the **"godfather of turntablism"** for his influence on competitive DJ technique and innovation

== Legacy ==
DJ Babu is regarded as one of the most influential turntablists of his generation. His technical innovations, pedagogical work at BJIOS and Peabody, and contributions to competitive DJ culture helped solidify turntablism as a distinct musical discipline.

== Discography ==
=== Albums ===
- Super Duck Breaks (1996)
- Super Duper Duck Breaks (2000)
- Duck Season Vol. 1 (2002)
- Duck Season Vol. 2 (2003)
- The L.J.'s (with Defari, as the Likwit Junkies) (2005)
- The Beat Tape Vol. 1 (2007)
- Duck Season Vol. 3 (2008)
- The Beat Tape Vol. 2 (2010)
- No Apologies (with LMNO) (2010)

=== Featured ===
- "Wild Stylus" (1997) [Scratches – tracks: A2 to A4, B1 to B2]

=== Singles ===
- "Pay Attention" (2001)
- "Duck Season" (2002)
- "Fan Mail" (2007)

=== Production ===
- "Funky Duck" Wild Stylus (1997)
- "Service" Dilated Peoples (2000)
- "Phil Da Agony Interlude"; "proper Propaganda"; "Pay Attention"; "Dilated Junkies"; "Hard Hitters" Dilated Peoples (2001)
- "Behold My Life (Remix)" Defari (2003)
- "International" Chali 2na (2005)
- "The L.J.'s" Likwit Junkies (2005)
- "Alarm Clock Music" Dilated Peoples (2006)
- "Vultures"; "Burn Big" Defari (2006)
- "Things You Do"; "A Moment in Time" Evidence (2007)
- "Rain or Shine" Evidence (2008)
- "C.T.D."; "Eyes Wide" Rakaa Iriscience (2010)
- "Same Folks" Evidence (2011)
- "BBQ Sauce" Sean Price (2012)
- "No Gunz Come Out"; "Lip Service"; "Curveball" Defari (2013)
- "Progressive 3" Vince Staples (2014)
- "Reversal"; "Figure It Out"; "Options May Vary" Dilated Peoples (2014)
- "Weather or Not" Evidence (2018)
