= Rakaa =

American rapper (born 1972)

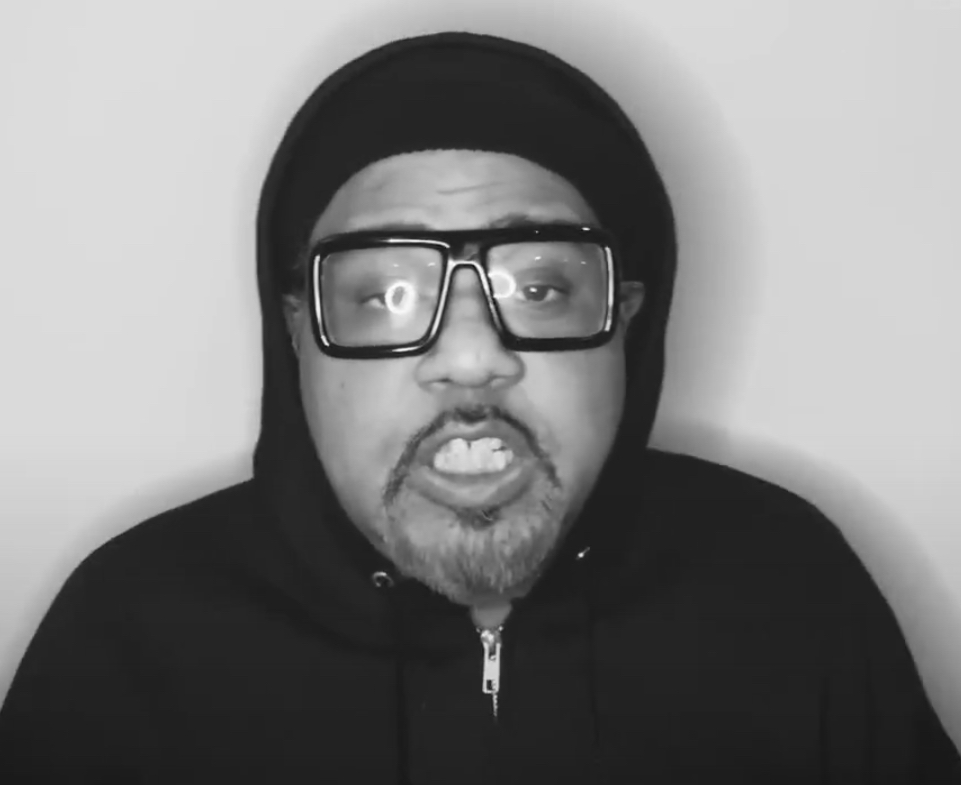
- Rakaa in 2023

Background information
- Also known as: Rakaa Iriscience, Iriscience
- Born: Rakaa Taylor; June 18, 1972 (age 54)
- Origin: Los Angeles, California, US
- Genre: Alternative hip-hop
- Occupations: Rapper; singer; songwriter
- Years active: 1998–present
- Label: Decon
- Member of: Dilated Peoples

Rakaa Taylor (born June 18, 1972) better known by his stage names Rakaa, Rakaa Iriscience, and Iriscience, is a rapper from Los Angeles, California. He is a member of Dilated Peoples alongside Evidence and DJ Babu.

== Life and career ==
His mother was a half Korean adoptee who was born in Korea during the Korean War and came to the United States at an early age.

With Evidence and DJ Babu he formed Dilated Peoples, releasing their first single "Third Degree" in 1997 via ABB Records and their debut studio album The Platform in 2000.

Rakaa released the solo debut album, Crown of Thorns, on Decon in 2010. It featured vocal contributions from Aloe Blacc, KRS-One, Chali 2na, Evidence, and Fashawn. It was produced by Exile, DJ Babu, Oh No, El-P, and The Alchemist.

== Discography ==
=== Albums ===
- Crown of Thorns (2010)

=== EPs ===
- The Delilah EP (2010)

=== Singles ===
- "Pay Attention" (2001)
- "End to Means" (2003)
- "New Maps" (2012)

=== Guest appearances ===
- Funkdoobiest - "Stretchin'" from The Troubleshooters (1998)
- Omid - "Who's Keeping Time?" from Beneath the Surface (1998)
- The Anonymous - "Dr. EZ's Cool Fantastic Part II" from Green and Gold
- The Mind Clouders - "Paranoia Shiek" from Fake It Until You Make It (1999)
- DJ Vadim - "Friction" from U.S.S.R. Life from the Other Side (1999)
- DJ Revolution - "The Revolution" from In 12's We Trust (2000)
- Runaways - "Pounds 4 Dollars" from Progress (2000)
- Mykill Miers - "Do the Math" from It's Been a Long Time Coming (2000)
- Swollen Members - "RPM" from Bad Dreams (2001)
- The Herbaliser - "Verbal Animé" from Something Wicked This Way Comes (2002)
- Blackalicious - "Passion" from Blazing Arrow (2002)
- Supernatural - "Work It Out" from The Lost Freestyle Files (2003)
- Transplants - "Crash and Burn" from Haunted Cities (2005)
- Boom Bap Project - "Cut Down Ya Options" from Reprogram (2005)
- The Likwit Junkies - "Dark Ends" from The L.J.'s (2005)
- Dan the Automator - "Champions" from Dan the Automator Presents 2K7 (2006)
- The Visionaries - "Need To Learn" from We Are the Ones (We've Been Waiting For) (2006)
- Evidence - "Perfect Storm" from The Weatherman LP (2007)
- Prince Ali - "The Path (East Bay Remix)" from Curb Side Service (2007)
- Longevity - "Throwin Up Letters" (2007)
- DJ Revolution - "Casualties of Tour" from King of the Decks (2008)
- Craig G & Marley Marl - "Quality Work" from Operation: Take Hip-Hop Back (2008)
- Looptroop Rockers - "Trance Fat" from Good Things (2008)
- Cradle Orchestra - "Yin Stacks" from Velvet Ballads (2009)
- Collective Elements - "Innervision" from Collective Elements (2009)
- Drunken Tiger - "Monster" (English Version) from Feel gHood Muzik : The 8th Wonder (2009)
- DJ Honda - "Let It Out" from IV (2009)
- Epik High - "Rocksteady" from E (2009)
- Jerome XL - "Zet 'T Blauw" from De Laatste Dag (2010)
- Chosen Few - "It's Good" from New World Symphony (2010)
- El Da Sensei & The Returners - "Knowledge Be the Key" from Global Takeover 2: Nu World (2010)
- Krazy Race - "Live & Learn" from The Rapture (2011)
- Evidence - "Where You Come From?" from Cats & Dogs (2011)
- Chino XL - "Take It Back" from Ricanstruction: The Black Rosary (2012)
- Sirkle of Sound - "The Future" from The Awakening (2012)
- Killa Hakan - "Berlin - Los Angeles" from Orijinal (2012)
- Anarchy Reigns - Additional voices (2013)
- Vlad Dobrescu - "Turnul Babel" from In Sfarsit (2013)
- Collective Elements - "Night Write" from Nice Vibez (2013)
- Snowgoons - "Nuclear Winter" from Black Snow 2 (2013)
- Rebel Diaz - "Which Side Are You On?" from Radical Dilemma (2013)
- LMNO - "March Madness" from After the Fact (2013)
- King Kapisi - "Crush" form Hip Hop Lives Here (2013)
- Step Brothers - "Tomorrow" from Lord Steppington (2014)
- Separ - "Úspech" from Pirát (2014)
- Pawz One - "Avalanche Warning" from Face the Facts (2014)
- Ali a.k.a. Mind - "Nada Nos Para" from Mestizo (2014)
- Apollo Brown & Ras Kass - "H20" from Blasphemy (2014)
- Danny Diablo - "Time Is Money" from The Crackson Heights Project (2017)
- HIT Rapper (2018)
- Evidence - "Wonderful World" (2018)
