= Black Sunday (Cypress Hill album) =

Studio album by Cypress Hill
- Released: July 20, 1993
- Recorded: February 1992 – April 1993
- Studios: 38 Fresh, Hollywood, CA; Baby Monster Studios, Hollywood, CA; Image Recording, Hollywood, CA; Chung King, New York, NY; Greene Street, New York, NY; Soundtrack Studios New York, NY; Studio 4 Recording, Philadelphia, PA
- Genres: West Coast hip-hop; Latin hip-hop; alternative hip-hop; hardcore hip-hop
- Length: 43:38
- Labels: Ruffhouse; Columbia
- Producers: DJ Muggs; T-Ray

Cypress Hill chronology
Something for the Blunted (1992)	Black Sunday (1993)	Cypress Hill III: Temples of Boom (1995)

Singles from Black Sunday
- 1. "Insane in the Brain" Released: June 22, 1993; 2. "When the Shit Goes Down" Released: 1993; 3. "I Ain't Goin' Out Like That" Released: 1993; 4. "Lick a Shot" Released: 1994

Black Sunday is the second studio album by American hip-hop group Cypress Hill. It was released on July 20, 1993, by Ruffhouse and Columbia Records, and proved as successful as their debut, Cypress Hill. The album debuted at No. 1 on the US Billboard 200, selling 261,000 copies in its first week of sales and became the highest Soundscan recording for a hip-hop group at the time. Also, with their previous album, Cypress Hill, still in the charts, they became the first hip-hop group ever to have two albums in the Top 10 of the U.S. Billboard 200 at the same time. The album went quadruple platinum in the U.S. with 3.4 million units sold.

== Background ==
The first single, "Insane in the Brain", became a crossover hit. A clean censored version of the album was also made which removes the song "A to the K". The song "Hand on the Glock" is a re-recorded version of the track "Hand on the Pump" from the debut album Cypress Hill.

On July 20, 2023, an expanded edition of the album was released to commemorate the 30th anniversary of the album, with five additional songs.

== Reception ==
Professional ratings
Initial reviews (in 1993)
Review scores
Source	Rating
Calgary Herald	B+
Entertainment Weekly	A−
Los Angeles Times	3/4 stars
NME	8/10
Orlando Sentinel	4/5 stars
Q	3/5 stars
Rolling Stone	4/5 stars
Select	4/5 medals
The Source	4/5 stars

Professional ratings
Retrospective reviews (after 1993)
Review scores
Source	Rating
AllMusic	4.5/5 stars
The Rolling Stone Album Guide	3/5 stars
Spin Alternative Record Guide	8/10

The single "I Ain't Goin' Out Like That" was nominated for the Grammy Award's Best Rap Performance of the year category.

Rolling Stone - 4 stars - Excellent - "…it's the Cypress combo of stark grooves and cinematic gangsta fairy tales that allows them to rule the streets, a formula not messed with on Black Sunday…"

The Source - 4 stars - Excellent - "…a darker sequel…this album is definitely worth buying as it easily rips the frame out of all those Cypress bandwagon jumpers…"

- Included in Q's list of the 50 Best Albums of 1993.
- Ranked No. 35 in Melody Maker's list of "The Albums of the Year" for 1993.
- Ranked No. 29 in the Village Voice's 1993 Pazz & Jop Critics Poll.
- Ranked No. 8 in New Musical Express's list of "The Top 50 LPs of 1993".

== Track listing ==
All tracks are written by Lawrence Muggerud, Louis Freese, and Senen Reyes, except track 2, written by Muggerud, Freese, and Todd Ray. All tracks produced by DJ Muggs, except track 2, produced by T-Ray.

No.	Title	Length
1.	"I Wanna Get High"	2:54
2.	"I Ain't Goin' Out Like That"	4:27
3.	"Insane in the Brain"	3:31
4.	"When the Shit Goes Down"	3:08
5.	"Lick a Shot"	3:23
6.	"Cock the Hammer"	4:25
7.	"Lock Down"	1:16
8.	"3 Lil' Putos"	3:40
9.	"Legalize It"	0:46
10.	"Hits from the Bong"	2:40
11.	"What Go Around Come Around, Kid"	3:42
12.	"A to the K"	3:27
13.	"Hand on the Glock"	3:32
14.	"Break 'Em Off Some"	2:44

30th anniversary expanded edition track listing
No.	Title	Length
15.	"Insane in the Brain - Statik Selektah Remix"	3:32
16.	"Lick a Shot - Baka Boys Remix"	3:12
17.	"Hits from the Bong - DJ Muggs 2023 Remix"	2:59
18.	"Scooby Doo"	3:40
19.	"Loco En El Coco - Insane in the Brain (Spanish Version)"	3:24
Total length:		60:24

=== Notes ===
- "I Ain't Goin' Out Like That" samples "The Wizard" by Black Sabbath
- Later repressings have a fade at the end of "Insane in the Brain" due to sample clearance issues, & "Lock Down" is omitted.

== Personnel ==
=== Cypress Hill ===
- B-Real – vocals
- Sen Dog – vocals
- DJ Muggs – turntables, arrangements, executive production, programming and mixing

=== Additional personnel ===
- T-Ray – producer ("I Ain't Goin' Out Like That")
- John Gamble – engineer
- Andy Kravitz – engineer
- Manuel Lecuona – engineer
- Jason Roberts – engineer
- Chris Shaw – engineer, mixing
- Joe Nicolo – executive producer, mixing
- Chris Schwartz – executive producer
- Jay Papke – design
- Anthony Artiaga – photography

== Charts ==
=== Weekly charts ===
Chart (1993)	Peak position
Australian Albums (ARIA)	13
Dutch Albums (Album Top 100)	26
German Albums (Offizielle Top 100)	36
Hungarian Albums (MAHASZ)	40
New Zealand Albums (RMNZ)	2
Swedish Albums (Sverigetopplistan)	19
Swiss Albums (Schweizer Hitparade)	38
UK Albums (Official Charts)	13
US Billboard 200	1
US Top R&B/Hip-Hop Albums (Billboard)	1

Chart (2025)	Peak position
Greek Albums (IFPI)	19

=== Year-end charts ===
Chart (1993)	Position
UK Albums (OCC)	96
US Billboard 200	33
US Top R&B/Hip-Hop Albums (Billboard)	19

Chart (1994)	Position
Australian Albums (ARIA)	93
New Zealand Albums (RMNZ)	12
US Billboard 200	98
US Top R&B/Hip-Hop Albums (Billboard)	98

Chart (2002)	Position
Canadian R&B Albums (Nielsen SoundScan)	162
Canadian Rap Albums (Nielsen SoundScan)	82

=== Singles ===
Year	Song	Chart positions					
Year	Song	Billboard Hot 100	Hot R&B/Hip-Hop Singles & Tracks	Hot Rap Singles	Rhythmic Top 40	Hot Dance Music/Maxi-Singles Sales	Hot Dance Music/Club Play
1993
1993	"Insane in the Brain"	#19	#27	#1	#16	#5	#16
1994
1994	"I Ain't Goin' Out Like That"	#65	#86	#21	-	#21	-

== Certifications ==
Region	Certification	Certified units/sales
Australia (ARIA)	Gold	35,000^{^}
Canada (Music Canada)	3× Platinum	300,000^{‡}
New Zealand (RMNZ)	Platinum	15,000^{^}
Switzerland (IFPI Switzerland)	Gold	25,000^{^}
United Kingdom (BPI)	Platinum	300,000^{^}
United States (RIAA)	4× Platinum	4,000,000^{‡}
^{^} Shipments figures based on certification alone.^{‡} Sales+streaming figures based on certification alone.

== See also ==
- List of number-one albums of 1993 (U.S.)
- List of number-one R&B albums of 1993 (U.S.)
