= When the Shit Goes Down =

1993 song performed by Cypress Hill

Single by Cypress Hill

from the album Black Sunday
- Released: 1993
- Recorded: 1993
- Genre: West Coast hip hop; hardcore hip hop
- Length: 3:09
- Label: Ruffhouse; Columbia
- Songwriters: Louis Freese; Lawrence Muggerud; Lawrence Emmett Dickens
- Producer: DJ Muggs

Cypress Hill singles chronology
"Insane in the Brain" (1993)	"When the Shit Goes Down" (1993)	"I Ain't Goin' Out Like That" (1993)

Music video
- "When the Shit Goes Down" on YouTube

"When the Shit Goes Down" (Note: "When the Ship Goes Down" on edited versions) is a song by American hip hop group Cypress Hill. It was released in 1993 by Ruffhouse and Columbia Records as the second single from the group's second studio album, Black Sunday (1993). The song is written by Louis Freese, Lawrence Muggerud and Lawrence Emmett Dickens, and produced by Muggerud. It was released exclusively in Australia and Europe.

== Music video ==
A music video for the song was directed by F. Gary Gray.

== Track listing ==
European 12"

Side A
No.	Title	Length
1.	"When the Shit Goes Down" (Extended Version)	4:12
2.	"When the Shit Goes Down" (instrumental)	3:09

Side B
No.	Title	Length
1.	"The Phuncky Feel One" (Extended Version)	5:02
2.	"How I Could Just Kill a Man" (The Killer Mix)	4:04

European promo single

No.	Title	Length
1.	"When the Shit Goes Down" (Extended Version)	4:12
2.	"When the Shit Goes Down" (instrumental)	3:09

European maxi single

No.	Title	Length
1.	"When the Ship Goes Down" (Radio Version)	3:09
2.	"When the Shit Goes Down" (Extended Version)	4:12
3.	"Latin Lingo" (Prince Paul mix)	4:41
4.	"The Phuncky Feel One" (Extended Version)	5:02

Australian maxi single

No.	Title	Length
1.	"When the Ship Goes Down" (Radio Version)	3:09
2.	"When the Shit Goes Down" (Extended Version)	4:12
3.	"Lick a Shot" (Vocal UD version)	3:24
4.	"Scooby Doo"	3:41
5.	"Latin Lingo" (Prince Paul mix)	4:41
6.	"The Phuncky Feel One" (Extended Version)	5:02

== Charts ==
Chart (1993)	Peak position
Australia (ARIA)	47
Europe (Eurochart Hot 100)	62
Ireland (IRMA)	25
New Zealand (RIANZ)	5
UK Singles (OCC)	19
UK Airplay (Music Week)	32
UK Dance (Music Week)	8
UK Club Chart (Music Week)	45

== In popular culture ==
- The song was used in the 2001 film Bully.
- An edited version of the song was used in the 2007 film Freedom Writers.
- The song was used in the pilot episode of Hello Ladies.
- The song was featured in the 2013 film This Is the End.
- The song was used in a second-season episode of The Affair.
- The song was featured in the 2018 film Mid90s.
- The song was used in the episode "Ezekiel Patrol" of the 2019 TV series Doom Patrol.
- The song was used in the 2019 film Guns Akimbo.
