= The Troubleshooters (album) =

Studio album by Funkdoobiest
- Released: January 13, 1998
- Recorded: 1997
- Studio: Track Records (North Hollywood, CA); Echo Sound (Los Angeles, CA); Blue Palm (Burbank, CA); Paramount
- Genre: West Coast hip hop
- Length: 1:01:14
- Label: Buzz Tone/RCA
- Producer: DJ Ralph M; DJ Rectangle; W.M. Tate; Ski; Da Beatminerz; Ray Roll

Funkdoobiest chronology
Brothas Doobie (1995)	The Troubleshooters (1997)	The Golden B-Boys (2009)

Singles from The Troubleshooters
- 1. "Papi Chulo" Released: 1997; 2. "Act On It" Released: 1997

The Troubleshooters is the third studio album by the Los Angeles–based Latin hip hop group Funkdoobiest, released on January 13, 1998. It was the group's first album without Tomahawk Funk. Unlike their previous two albums, there is no production by their mentor DJ Muggs.

"Papi Chulo" features Tha Dogg Pound member Daz Dillinger.

== Critical reception ==
Professional ratings
Review scores
Source	Rating
AllMusic	3/5 stars
Chicago Tribune	3/4 stars
The Source	3/5 stars

The Hartford Courant noted "the relative lack of filler and the DJ Ralph M.'s original approach to samples." The Chicago Tribune wrote: "Opting to entertain rather than overwhelm, Funkdoobiest's third album wins with laughs and their trademark off-kilter presentation ... '!Oyi Papi!' is hard-core Latino hip-hop at its finest." The Austin American-Statesman stated: "Sampling from a brightly colored sonic palette of beats, cultures, languages and guest MCs ... Funkdoobiest has created the ultimate urban cruisin' soundtrack—on which the moods change as fast as the passing landscape." Gabriel Alvarez, in his review for The Source, thought that The Troubleshooters "misfires, because it doesn't stick with its strongest assets: Spanish flavor, humor and off-kilter production".

== Track listing ==
No.	Title	Producer(s)	Length
1.	"Doobie Show"		1:37
2.	"Papi Chulo" (featuring Daz Dillinger, Cobra Red & Nina Lares)	DJ Rectangle	4:25
3.	"On the Premises"	DJ Ralph M	2:31
4.	"Crazy Puerto Rican"	DJ Ralph M	3:52
5.	"The Anthem" (featuring LC Johnson & William J. Mendoza)	W.M. Tate	4:05
6.	"Alley"		1:50
7.	"¡Oyé Papi!"	DJ Ralph M	3:09
8.	"Sunshine" (featuring Mona Lisa Romero)	DJ Ralph M	3:25
9.	"Act on It" (featuring Kam)	DJ Rectangle	3:40
10.	"First Million"	W.M. Tate	1:13
11.	"Natural Fun" (featuring Ski & Krumb Snatcha)	Ski	3:34
12.	"Life's a Gamble" (featuring Hittman, Phats Bossi & Brett Bouldin)	DJ Ralph M	3:39
13.	"Tribal Flutes"		0:50
14.	"Five Deadly Indians"	DJ Ralph M	3:28
15.	"The Troubleshooters"		0:38
16.	"Holdin' It Down" (featuring Tony Touch, Krumb Snatcha, Derelict & Easy D)	Da Beatminerz	3:35
17.	"I'm Feelin' It"	DJ Ralph M	2:56
18.	"Doobie Knows (Have Some Fun)" (featuring Hurricane G & Uneek)	Ray Roll	4:10
19.	"Stretchin'" (featuring Rakaa Iriscience)	DJ Ralph M	4:06
20.	"Papi Chulo [Spanish]" (featuring Cobra Red & Nina Lares)	DJ Rectangle	8:02
Total length:			1:01:14

== Sample credits ==
Papi Chulo

- "Hot" by Squirrel Nut Zippers
- "Get Up, Get into It, Get Involved" by James Brown

Act on It

- "Jam on It" by Newcleus

Holdin' It Down

- "Capsule" by William S. Fischer

Doobie Knows

- "Ain't No Sunshine" by Tom Jones

== Charts ==
Chart (1998)	Peak position
US Top R&B/Hip-Hop Albums (Billboard)	90
