= Insane in the Brain =

Single by Cypress Hill

from the album Black Sunday
- Released: June 22, 1993
- Genre: Hip hop; gangsta rap; horrorcore
- Length: 3:32
- Label: Ruffhouse; Columbia
- Songwriters: Louis Freese; Lawrence Muggerud; Senen Reyes
- Producer: DJ Muggs

Cypress Hill singles chronology
| "Latin Lingo" (1992) | "Insane in the Brain" (1993) | "When the Shit Goes Down" (1993) |

Music video
- "Insane in the Brain" on YouTube

"Insane in the Brain" is a song by American hip-hop group Cypress Hill, released in June 1993, by Ruffhouse and Columbia Records, as the first single from the group's second album, Black Sunday (1993). The song was written by group members Louis Freese, Lawrence Muggerud and Senen Reyes, and produced by Muggerud (DJ Muggs). In addition to hitting number one on the US rap chart, it also was a mainstream hit, reaching number 19 on the Billboard Hot 100 in 1993. "Insane in the Brain" earned a 3× platinum certification from the Recording Industry Association of America and sold 3,000,000 copies domestically. The accompanying music video was directed by Josh Taft, featuring the group performing at a rave with strobing effects and "psychedelic" colorations.

In 2008, the song was ranked number 34 on VH1's 100 Greatest Songs of Hip Hop.

== Origins and structure ==
According to B-Real, the song was actually a diss song aimed at Chubb Rock and Kid Frost. The group felt Chubb had ridiculed their style on his 1992 album, I Gotta Get Mine Yo. DJ Muggs credited "Jump Around" by House of Pain, also produced by himself, as a major influence.

According to a live interview aired on Double J during a feature of the Black Sunday album, "insane in the membrane" was a localised gang term used at the time by the Crips when doing something crazy. It was then appropriated into this song. A 2019 interview with The Guardian elaborated further that both Bloods and Crips used a similar phrase as an informal insanity plea upon arrest. The Double-J interview also notes that B-Real was a member of the Bloods.

The song is built around many samples:

- A drum break from organist George Semper's cover version of Lee Dorsey's "Get Out of My Life, Woman"
- A sample of James Brown grunting from the opening of his song "Say It Loud – I'm Black and I'm Proud"
- A vocal sample of the line "insane in the brain" from Cypress Hill's own song "Hole in the Head"
- A vocal sample of the line "just another local" from their own song "How I Could Just Kill a Man" during the second and the third chorus
- A vocal sample at the end of the second chorus from the beginning of the 'Prince Paul Mix' of their own song "Latin Lingo"
- A sample of the opening keyboard riff from Sly and the Family Stone's "Life"
- A vocal sample of the line "gunshot me head back" from Buju Banton's "Boom By By" before the start of the third verse
- A sample of the line "I think I'm going crazy" from the Youngbloods' "All Over the World (La La)" which concludes the track

== Sampling controversy ==
The origin of the most prominent sample, repeated throughout the song, has been a matter of dispute. DJ Muggs initially claimed the sample was a pitched blues guitar, although shortly after, he claimed that the sound is a horn. Many sources claim that it is actually a sample of a horse from Mel and Tim's "Good Guys Only Win in the Movies", but during an interview with Sound on Sound in December 2018 on the production techniques used, DJ Muggs refuted the sample:

That's weird, everybody thinks that's a horse, but it isn't. I've seen that a bunch of times on these sample sites. That's a sound I made from a blues guitar pitched. At the time I used to run some sounds through guitar amps. When I heard that horse thing, I was like, 'Oh, that sounds just like it.' Honestly to God, those sample sites get a lot wrong. They have some shit right, but I'll go, 'I never used that.' I don't know where they gather their information. Sometimes, they're spot on, but sometimes, I'm like, 'Yo, you guys are off.'

However, less than two months later in an interview with British newspaper The Guardian, Muggs then claimed the sound effect was made by a horn and not a guitar. In a much earlier interview with The Wire magazine, when asked: "You're well known for using unusual sample sources not just in terms of the music you sample from – from funk, soul and jazz to krautrock and metal – but also different kinds of sounds, like sirens, elephants, horses", Muggs' response was "Yes, you know I have a visual thought first of all and that excites me and on the conscious side of it, I'm always looking for things that are awkward".

This has since caused disbelief that Muggs is telling the truth and that the sample may well be the horse from Mel and Tim's "Good Guys Only Win in the Movies". Muggs himself has later claimed that he has "a foggy memory when it comes to the samples used on 'Insane in the Brain'" due to the fact that at the time of the song's production, "there was a lot of weed smoked" and that he confirmed he was "not musically trained, never went to music school and I don't play instruments".

== Critical reception ==
In a retrospective review, Jesse Ducker from Albumism described "Insane in the Brain" as an "upbeat, pulsing, almost circus-like track." Upon the release, Larry Flick from Billboard magazine wrote, "One of the hip-hop community's leading acts returns with a slammin' romp. Resting on a beat-bed of loopy samples and nimble scratches, act drops rhymes that are even sharper than on previous efforts. A head-bobbin' midtempo groove leads them into a brain-embedding hook that will help knock down urban and pop radio doors." Ben Thompson from The Independent viewed it as a "potent dose of marijuana-inflected nasal squeak-rap. The party record of the aeon." Taylor Parkes from Melody Maker said, "Basically, this is a wonderfully wired ode to dope paranoia". Music & Media commented, "If you think you're going slightly mad, you haven't heard this Hispanic gangsta rap outfit yet. They drive you nuts, introducing neighing horses as backup singers." Andy Beevers from Music Week gave it a score of three out of five, calling it an "excellent new single from LA's celebrated smokers" and "a tough funky track." He added that "it sounds similar to the House of Pain hits, but not as commercial." Keith Cameron from NME named it Single of This Week, stating that "Insane in the Brain" "is definitive CH, with whistling kettle feedback blasts all over the (cough) joint, dopey drum kicks causing you to prance foolishly round the kitchen and B-Real throwing down a gauntlet of sorts..."

NME editor Johnny Cigarettes declared it as "a stomping pant-swinger of a party record". Parry Gettelman from Orlando Sentinel remarked the "whinnying" sample on the "infernally catchy" track. James Hamilton from the Record Mirror Dance Update described it as a "Public Enemy-ish mildly jaunty jolting jiggly roller" in his weekly dance column. Another RM editor, Richard Russell, wrote, "While this covers pretty much the same ground as the debut LP, it will help to satiate the appetite of countless Cypress fans hungry for new material. B-Real's nasal whine is now one of the most distinctive sounds in hip hop, here complaining about "cops trying to snatch his crops". Adam Higginbotham from Select noted that it "finishes with an inexplicable snatch of Gene Pitney". Tom Doyle from Smash Hits gave the song four out of five, saying, "Any single that begins with someone murmuring "Don'tchoo know I'm loco?" is sure to be good." He stated further that Cypress Hill "are the best American rap stars for ages". Charles Aaron from Spin felt that "DJ Muggs's sample-squeal perfectly mirrors the reckless, loony edge in B-Real's voice, and it goes straight to your head (and so on). But what's remarkable is not that such a pro-drug, anti-cop stance is in heavy pop rotation, but that the song's repetitive drum-whack makes you wonder: "Goin' insane..."? Well, yeah, why mince words? We're already there."

== Music video ==
A music video for the track was filmed at San Francisco's DNA Lounge. It was directed by American director Josh Taft and features the group performing at what appears to be a rave, makes heavy use of strobing effects and "psychedelic" colorations, alongside numerous shots of marijuana usage, all of which seemingly corresponds with the album's drug-filled recording process, as described by the group. The video was later made available on Cypress Hill's official YouTube channel in 2009, and had generated more than 227 million views as of May 2025.

== Live performances ==
Cypress Hill performed the song live on Saturday Night Live on October 2, 1993.

== Track listings ==
- UK CD single
1. "Insane in the Brain" (Radio Edit) – 3:32
2. "Stoned Is the Way of the Walk" – 2:46
3. "Something for the Blunted" – 1:15
4. "Insane in the Brain" (Extended Version) – 4:56
- 1999 remix CD1
1. "Insane in the Brain" (Jason Master Blaster Edit) – 4:06
2. "Insane in the Brain" (Jason Master Blaster Club Mix) – 5:02
3. "Insane in the Brain" (Da Funky Chunky Mix) – 6:36
- 1999 remix CD2
1. "Insane in the Brain" (Nevins' Asylum Edit) – 3:40
2. "Insane in the Brain" (Nevins' Asylum Club Mix) – 6:06
3. "Insane in the Brain" (The Funky French B-Boy Remix) – 5:40

== Charts ==
=== Weekly charts ===
| Chart (1993) | Peak position |
|---|---|
| Australia (ARIA) | 40 |
| Canada Retail Singles (The Record) | 3 |
| Europe (Eurochart Hot 100) | 56 |
| Europe (European Dance Radio) | 14 |
| Germany (Official German Charts) | 93 |
| Ireland (IRMA) | 18 |
| Netherlands (Dutch Single Tip) | 9 |
| New Zealand (RIANZ) | 12 |
| UK Singles (OCC) | 21 |
| UK Airplay (ERA) | 74 |
| UK Dance (Music Week) | 3 |
| UK Club Chart (Music Week) | 38 |
| US Billboard Hot 100 | 19 |
| US Dance Club Songs (Billboard) | 16 |
| US Hot Dance Music/Maxi-Singles Sales (Billboard) | 5 |
| US Hot Rap Songs (Billboard) | 1 |
| US Hot R&B/Hip-Hop Songs (Billboard) | 27 |
| US Rhythmic Airplay (Billboard) | 16 |
| US Cash Box Top 100 | 23 |

=== Jason Nevins remix ===
| Chart (1999) | Peak position |
|---|---|
| Australia (ARIA) | 35 |
| Germany (GfK) | 27 |
| Netherlands (Dutch Top 40 Tipparade) | 3 |
| Netherlands (Single Top 100) | 49 |
| New Zealand (Recorded Music NZ) | 31 |
| Sweden (Sverigetopplistan) | 33 |
| Switzerland (Schweizer Hitparade) | 28 |
| UK Singles (OCC) | 19 |

=== Year-end charts ===
| Chart (1993) | Position |
|---|---|
| US Billboard Hot 100 | 65 |

== Certifications ==
| Region | Certification | Certified units/sales |
|---|---|---|
| New Zealand (RMNZ) | Platinum | 30,000^{‡} |
| United Kingdom (BPI) | Platinum | 600,000^{‡} |
| United States (RIAA) | 3× Platinum | 3,000,000^{‡} |
^{‡} Sales+streaming figures based on certification alone.
