= Todd Ray =

American former music producer and mixing engineer

- Also known as: T-Ray
- Born: Lancaster, South Carolina, U.S.
- Origin: Los Angeles, California, U.S.
- Occupations: Record producer; mixing engineer

Todd Ray, known professionally as T-Ray, is an American record producer and mixing engineer, known for producing Cypress Hill 1993 single "I Ain't Goin' Out Like That" and having founded the Venice Beach Freakshow in 2006, as well as creating and executive producing the TV Series Freakshow for AMC . He has also worked with Beastie Boys, Biz Markie, MC Serch, Double X Posse, Kool G Rap, Bo$$, Funkdoobiest, MC Thick, The Whooliganz, Artifacts, Mick Jagger, Helmet, Korn, Audioslave, (həd)^{pe}, Snot, Ugly Americans, G. Love & Special Sauce, Dilated Peoples and Non Phixion among others. He has won two Grammy Awards and a Latin Grammy Award for his work with Santana and Ozomatli and was nominated for a Grammy Award for "I Ain't Goin' Out Like That".

== Early life ==
Todd Ray was born in Lancaster, South Carolina. As a teenager, in 1982, Todd fell in love with the early hip hop singles coming out of New York and began DJing and performing locally with friends. In 1986, he landed a record contract which led him to New York where he met his future wife, Danielle. He and Danielle ultimately moved to Los Angeles, settling in the suburbs to raise their two children.

== Music production ==
Growing up in the rural South, Ray's living conditions and local entertainment options left much to be desired. After hearing a friend's copy of Afrika Bambaataa & the Soulsonic Force's "Planet Rock", Ray purchased a pair of turntables. He and his friends began performing locally. At this time, their group did not have a name and people would simply refer to them as 'those white boys'. Swatch Watch sponsored them, flying them to Breckenridge, Colorado, for one of the first ever snowboarding events, where Converse Sneakers reps provided additional sponsorship. Using his portion of the sponsorship money, T-Ray began building his record collection, which provided a solid foundation for his budding production skills. After mastering the concept of 'breaks', he quickly finished his group's first demo. A club in nearby Charlotte, North Carolina, was having a talent contest which Todd won several weeks in a row, which qualified him for the finals. The final competition was judged by representatives from Def Jam and PolyGram. Although Todd did not win the final competition, a PolyGram representative approached Todd with the offer of a record contract in 1986.

With the ink still drying on their deal, T-Ray and his group, moved straight from South Carolina to Rosedale, Queens, where they finished an album for Tin Pan Apple Records and appeared on the Fresh Fest Tour. But PolygGram's rival, Def Jam, quickly became a household name and by the summer of 1987, the group broke up. Todd eventually ran out of money and had to move back to South Carolina. With no rural job opportunities, and his pre-med scholarship lost, Todd worked non-stop on music production. Unable to afford even the floppy disks to save the beats, he would just record them on cassette.

Ray helped his family build furniture out of wood, which he dubbed 'folk art' furniture, with the tree bark still attached. People began paying handsomely for his chairs and he was able to save enough money to make the trip back to New York. Ray got a call back on his application as an intern at Big Beat Records. Todd played a tape of his beats for Craig Kallman and informed him "All I have is music". The morning after, Kallman called Todd (about Kenny Dope's promo for Red Alert) and told him "if you know how to make this [recorded loop] into a record, you've got a job". T-Ray was the producer of Big Beat Records' first hip-hop 12-inch, 'Supa Cat' (1991- Todd is credited on the album as 'The Mad Racket'). 'Supa Cat' sold 70,000 copies and was the true beginning of T-Ray's career as a producer. He went on to produce an entire album for Double X, with 'Not Gonna Be Able To Do It" (1992) becoming his first video. T-Ray produced 'I Aint Goin' Out Like That' for Cypress Hill's album Black Sunday (1993) and was nominated for a Grammy for it (Best Rap single). Todd then became closely affiliated with the DJ Muggs-led Soul Assassins producing for Cypress Hill and Funkdoobiest, among others.

By 1996, Todd had begun to produce rock & roll. His 1993 remix of House of Pain/Helmet collaboration (Judgement Night soundtrack) led to his producing of the entire Helmet album, which led to more rock gigs, including 311, KoЯn, Snot, Hed PE, John Spencer Blues Explosion and White Zombie. In 1999, T-Ray did production for Santana (which led to a Grammy Award in 2000 for Album of the Year) and a Latin group named Ozomatli who he won two other Grammys with, including a Latin Grammy- it was during this time that his life came full circle: "It was sort of like destiny in a way, for me to move from the woods to New York City," explains Todd Ray. "To get on as a producer, to go through turmoil, through hip-hop, and get to the point where I felt that people were doing hip-hop that I couldn't respect, so I moved to the West Coast to do rock & roll shit. I run into a group called Ozomatli who I wanted to do 'Incredible Bongo Beats' with. Their DJ just happened to be Cut Chemist, who I knew nothing about. But, as we're finishing the record he tells me this fucking story of how he was inspired by this fucking tape that he got from down South, and that tape was my fucking tape. The same tape I made in that shack, the same tape that I played for Craig when I met him at Big Beat. The same tape that I had played for the trees in Lancaster, South Carolina. I had made one copy for Eclipse (yes- that Eclipse), who originally lived in South Carolina too, who had sent it to an old friend in Rhode Island, who moved to L.A. and became one of the members of Jurassic 5, whose DJ just happened to be Cut Chemist. I felt like I had come 360 degrees!" [Elemental Magazine, Issue #62]

== Venice Beach Freakshow ==
Ray founded the Venice Beach Freakshow in 2006. It quickly became known for its unique performers, as well as its large collection of oddity specimens. These included the world's largest collection of two-headed animals, including a two-headed chicken, a two-headed cow, and a pair of two-headed turtles, amongst others. While many specimens were dead, there were also around ten two-headed animals living in the Freakshow. This later led to the unscripted reality television show Freakshow, which depicted the lives of Ray, his family, and the show's performers. It ran for two seasons.

In 2017, it was announced that the Venice Beach Freakshow would be closing. This was after eight months of dispute with the building's new owners, Snapshot Partners, rumored to be associated with the Snapchat brand as part of the company's buy-up of Venice Beach property. Snapchat denied these claims, stating that they are unaffiliated with Snapshot Partners and was uninterested in the floor of the property in which the Freakshow was housed. Despite this, evidence shows that Snapchat did associate with Snapshot Partners in acquiring the building, which led to the Freakshow being a part of protests like #EvictSnapchat, fighting the gentrification of Venice Beach. The Venice Beach Freakshow's closing is considered by critics of gentrification to be part of the destruction of Venice Beach's culture, long known for its bodybuilders and graffiti artists. Others, however, see the gentrification of Venice Beach as simply the normal flow of the property market and the Freakshow as being a part of Venice's past.

== Personal life ==
Ray is married to Danielle. They have a daughter, Asia, and a son, Phoenix.

== Production discography ==
Year	Song	Artist	Album	Notes
1992	"Now They Wanna See Me"	Percee P, Ekim	N/A	co-produced w/ Ekim
1992	"Back to the Grill"	MC Serch, Chubb Rock, Nas, Red Hot Lover Tone	Return of the Product	co-produced w/ MC Serch
1992	"Daze in a Weak"	MC Serch	Return of the Product	co-produced w/ MC Serch
1992	"Social Narcotics"	MC Serch, Joe Fatal	Return of the Product	co-produced w/ MC Serch
1992	"Scenes From the Mind"	MC Serch	Return of the Product	co-produced w/ MC Serch
1992	"Here It Comes Again"	MC Serch	Return of the Product	co-produced w/ MC Serch
1992	"Put Ya Boots On"	Double X Posse	Put Ya Boots On	
1992	"Somethin' Funky ta Step To"	Double X Posse	Put Ya Boots On	
1992	"Girls Be Frontin'..."	Double X Posse	Put Ya Boots On	
1992	"Not Gonna Be Able to Do It"	Double X Posse	Put Ya Boots On	
1993	"Diary of a Mad Bitch"	Bo$$	Born Gangstaz	produced w/ MC Serch
1993	"I Don't Give a Fuck"	Bo$$	Born Gangstaz	produced w/ MC Serch
1993	"Timber"	Joe Fatal	N/A	
1993	"The Show Ain't Over Till the Fat Man Swings"	MC Thick	The Show Ain't Over Till the Fat Man Swings	
1993	"Portrait of a Fiend"	MC Thick	The Show Ain't Over Till the Fat Man Swings	
1993	"Just Like a Niguh"	MC Thick	The Show Ain't Over Till the Fat Man Swings	
1993	"From the Brick Jungle"	MC Thick	The Show Ain't Over Till the Fat Man Swings	co-produced w/ J. Diamond Washington & Stewart Harris
1993	"It Ain't Easy Bein' Me"	MC Thick	The Show Ain't Over Till the Fat Man Swings	
1993	"Only in America"	MC Thick	The Show Ain't Over Till the Fat Man Swings	
1993	"Hustler"	MC Thick	The Show Ain't Over Till the Fat Man Swings	
1993	"T.H.I.C.K."	MC Thick	The Show Ain't Over Till the Fat Man Swings	
1993	"You Said It Couldn't Be Done"	MC Thick	The Show Ain't Over Till the Fat Man Swings	
1993	"Leave 'Em Out There"	MC Thick	The Show Ain't Over Till the Fat Man Swings	
1993	"Bitch Control"	MC Thick	The Show Ain't Over Till the Fat Man Swings	
1993	"I'm Shittin' on 'Em"	Funkdoobiest	Which Doobie U B?	
1993	"Who's the Doobiest"	Funkdoobiest	Which Doobie U B?	
1993	"Where's It At"	Funkdoobiest	Which Doobie U B?	
1993	"Wopbabalubop"	Funkdoobiest, B-Real	Which Doobie U B?	
1993	"I Ain't Goin' Out Like That"	Cypress Hill	Black Sunday	
1993	"Come and Die"	Therapy?, Joe Fatal	Judgment Night (Music From the Motion Picture)	
1993	"It's the Whoolies"	The Whooliganz	Proposed Album {unreleased}	
1993	"Get a Grip"	The Whooliganz, B-Real	Proposed Album {unreleased}	
1993	"Time Goes On"	The Whooliganz, B-Real	Proposed Album {unreleased}	
1993	"Back Off Me Yo"	The Whooliganz	Proposed Album {unreleased}	
1993	"Keep On"	The Whooliganz	Proposed Album {unreleased}	
1993	"I Get Mine"	The Whooliganz	Proposed Album {unreleased}	
1994	"Wrong Side of da Tracks"	Artifacts	Between a Rock and a Hard Place	
1994	"Heavy Ammunition"	Artifacts	Between a Rock and a Hard Place	
1994	"Notty Headed Nigguhz"	Artifacts	Between a Rock and a Hard Place	
1994	"Whayback"	Artifacts	Between a Rock and a Hard Place	
1994	"Flexi wit da Tech(nique)"	Artifacts	Between a Rock and a Hard Place	
1994	"Lower da Boom"	Artifacts	Between a Rock and a Hard Place	
1994	"Dynamite Soul"	Artifacts	Between a Rock and a Hard Place	
1994	"Whassup Now Muthafucka?"	Artifacts	Between a Rock and a Hard Place	
1994	"Down South"	Down South	Lost in Brooklyn	
1994	"Tractors, Rakes, and Hoes"	Down South	Lost in Brooklyn	
1994	"Scooby Doo"	Cypress Hill	Lick a Shot 12"	produced w/ DJ Muggs
1994	"Wilma's Rainbow"	Helmet	Betty	produced w/ Helmet
1994	"I Know"	Helmet	Betty	produced w/ Helmet
1994	"Biscuits for Smut"	Helmet	Betty	produced w/ Helmet
1994	"Tic"	Helmet	Betty	produced w/ Helmet
1994	"Rollo"	Helmet	Betty	produced w/ Helmet
1994	"Clean"	Helmet	Betty	produced w/ Helmet
1994	"Vaccination"	Helmet	Betty	produced w/ Helmet
1994	"Beautiful Love"	Helmet	Betty	produced w/ Helmet
1994	"Speechless"	Helmet	Betty	produced w/ Helmet
1994	"The Silver Hawaiian"	Helmet	Betty	produced w/ Helmet
1994	"Overrated"	Helmet	Betty	produced w/ Helmet
1994	"Sam Hell"	Helmet	Betty	produced w/ Helmet
1995	"Love Slave"	Undacova	New Jersey Drive, Vol. 1	
1995	"Take 'Em to War"	Kool G Rap, B-1, MF Grimm	4,5,6	
1995	"For da Brothaz"	Kool G Rap	4,5,6	
1997	"P.O.S."	(həd)^{pe}	(həd)^{pe}	produced w/ Wesstyle & M.C.U.D.
1997	"Ground"	(həd)^{pe}	(həd)^{pe}	
1997	"Serpent Boy"	(həd)^{pe}	(həd)^{pe}	
1997	"Firsty"	(həd)^{pe}	(həd)^{pe}	
1997	"Tired of Sleep (T.O.S.)"	(həd)^{pe}	(həd)^{pe}	
1997	"Darky"	(həd)^{pe}	(həd)^{pe}	
1997	"Schpamb"	(həd)^{pe}	(həd)^{pe}	
1997	"Ken 2012"	(həd)^{pe}	(həd)^{pe}	
1997	"Circus"	(həd)^{pe}	(həd)^{pe}	
1997	"33"	(həd)^{pe}	(həd)^{pe}	
1997	"Hill"	(həd)^{pe}	(həd)^{pe}	
1997	"IFO"	(həd)^{pe}	(həd)^{pe}	
1997	"Bitches"	(həd)^{pe}	(həd)^{pe}	
1997	"Snot"	Snot	Get Some	
1997	"Stoopid"	Snot	Get Some	
1997	"Joy Ride"	Snot	Get Some	
1997	"The Box"	Snot	Get Some	
1997	"Snooze Button"	Snot	Get Some	
1997	"313"	Snot	Get Some	
1997	"Get Some"	Snot	Get Some	
1997	"Deadfall"	Snot	Get Some	
1997	"I Jus' Lie"	Snot	Get Some	
1997	"Get Some o' Deez"	Snot	Get Some	
1997	"Unplugged"	Snot	Get Some	
1997	"Tecato"	Snot	Get Some	
1997	"Mr. Brett"	Snot	Get Some	
1997	"Get Some Keez"	Snot	Get Some	
1997	"My Balls"	Snot	Get Some	
1998	"Como Ves"	Ozomatli	Ozomatli	co-produced w/ Ozomatli
1998	"Cut Chemist Suite"	Ozomatli	Ozomatli	co-produced w/ Ozomatli
1998	"Cumbia de los Muertos"	Ozomatli	Ozomatli	co-produced w/ Ozomatli
1998	"¿Dónde Se Fueron?"	Ozomatli	Ozomatli	co-produced w/ Ozomatli
1998	"Eva"	Ozomatli	Ozomatli	co-produced w/ Ozomatli
1998	"O Le Le"	Ozomatli	Ozomatli	co-produced w/ Ozomatli
1998	"Chango"	Ozomatli	Ozomatli	co-produced w/ Ozomatli
1998	"Super Bowl Sundae"	Ozomatli	Ozomatli	co-produced w/ Ozomatli
1998	"Aquí No Será"	Ozomatli	Ozomatli	co-produced w/ Ozomatli
1998	"Chota"	Ozomatli	Ozomatli	co-produced w/ Ozomatli
1998	"Coming War"	Ozomatli	Ozomatli	co-produced w/ Ozomatli
1998	"La Misma Canción"	Ozomatli	Ozomatli	co-produced w/ Ozomatli
1998	"Boom Boom Baby"	Ugly Americans	Boom Boom Baby	co-produced w/ Bruce Hughes
1998	"Texas Isn't Big Enough"	Ugly Americans	Boom Boom Baby	co-produced w/ Bruce Hughes
1998	"The Wrong Direction"	Ugly Americans	Boom Boom Baby	co-produced w/ Bruce Hughes
1998	"Hippietown"	Ugly Americans	Boom Boom Baby	co-produced w/ Bruce Hughes
1998	"Big Ole Head"	Ugly Americans	Boom Boom Baby	co-produced w/ Bruce Hughes
1998	"Spacesuit"	Ugly Americans	Boom Boom Baby	co-produced w/ Bruce Hughes
1998	"Dancing at the Foot of Angels"	Ugly Americans	Boom Boom Baby	co-produced w/ Bruce Hughes
1998	"Orlando"	Ugly Americans	Boom Boom Baby	co-produced w/ Bruce Hughes
1998	"One & a Rainbow"	Ugly Americans	Boom Boom Baby	co-produced w/ Bruce Hughes
1998	"Fastest Man Alive"	Ugly Americans	Boom Boom Baby	co-produced w/ Bruce Hughes
1999	"No Turning Back"	G. Love & Special Sauce	Philadelphonic	produced w/ Chris DiBeneditto
1999	"Dreamin'"	G. Love & Special Sauce	Philadelphonic	produced w/ Chris DiBeneditto
1999	"Roaches"	G. Love & Special Sauce	Philadelphonic	produced w/ Chris DiBeneditto
1999	"Rodeo Clowns"	G. Love & Special Sauce	Philadelphonic	produced w/ Chris DiBeneditto
1999	"Numbers"	G. Love & Special Sauce	Philadelphonic	produced w/ Chris DiBeneditto
1999	"Relax"	G. Love & Special Sauce	Philadelphonic	produced w/ Chris DiBeneditto
1999	"Do It for Free"	G. Love & Special Sauce	Philadelphonic	produced w/ Chris DiBeneditto
1999	"Honor and Harmony"	G. Love & Special Sauce	Philadelphonic	produced w/ Chris DiBeneditto
1999	"Kick Drum"	G. Love & Special Sauce	Philadelphonic	produced w/ Chris DiBeneditto
1999	"Friday Night"	G. Love & Special Sauce	Philadelphonic	produced w/ Chris DiBeneditto
1999	"Rock and Roll"	G. Love & Special Sauce	Philadelphonic	produced w/ Chris DiBeneditto
1999	"Love"	G. Love & Special Sauce	Philadelphonic	produced w/ Chris DiBeneditto
1999	"Around the World (Thank You)"	G. Love & Special Sauce	Philadelphonic	produced w/ Chris DiBeneditto
1999	"Gimme Some Lovin'"	G. Love & Special Sauce	Philadelphonic	produced w/ Chris DiBeneditto
1999	"Wishing It Was"	Santana, Eagle-Eye Cherry	Supernatural	additional production
2000	"No Retreat"	Dilated Peoples, B-Real	The Platform	
2002	"The C.I.A. Is Still Trying to Kill Me"	Non Phixion	The Future Is Now	produced w/ Necro
2003	"Hobo Blues"	G. Love	Thicker Than Water (Music From a Film by Jack Johnson and the Malloys)	
2004	"Believe"	Ozomatli	Street Signs	produced w/ Ozomatli
2004	"Love & Hope"	Ozomatli	Street Signs	produced w/ Ozomatli
2004	"Street Signs"	Ozomatli	Street Signs	produced w/ Ozomatli
2004	"(Who Discovered) America?"	Ozomatli	Street Signs	produced w/ J. B. Eckl, Jason Roberts, KC Porter, co-produced w/ Ozomatli
2004	"Te Estoy Buscando"	Ozomatli	Street Signs	produced w/ Ozomatli
2004	"Saturday Night"	Ozomatli	Street Signs	produced w/ Ozomatli
2004	"Déjame en Paz"	Ozomatli	Street Signs	produced w/ Ozomatli
2004	"Santiago"	Ozomatli	Street Signs	produced w/ Ozomatli
2004	"Doña Isabelle"	Ozomatli	Street Signs	produced w/ Ozomatli
2004	"Nadie Te Tira"	Ozomatli	Street Signs	produced w/ Ozomatli
2004	"Cuando Canto"	Ozomatli	Street Signs	produced w/ Ozomatli
2007	"My Element"	Skyzoo	Corner Store Classic	
2008	"Babylon"	Ill Bill	The Hour of Reprisal	

=== Remixes ===
- Back To the Grill (12") Back To The Grill (Remix) Def Jam Recordings 1992
- Losin' Myself (12") Losin' Myself (T-Ray's... Atlantic 1992
- Our House (12", Promo) Turnstyle Records 1992
- Sexual (CD, Maxi) Sexual (Safe Sex Mix),... Big Beat 1992
- From The Brick Jungle (12") Bitch Control (Da Fell... Big Beat 1993
- I Ain't Goin' Out Like That (12") Hits From The Bong Ruffhouse Records 1993
- Judgment Night (Music From The Motion Picture) (12") Just Another Victim (T... Epic 1993
- Just Another Victim (CD, Promo) Epic 1993
- Swim (CD, Single, Ltd) Swim (T. Ray H2O Mix) Columbia 1993
- The Program (12") The Program (Soul Assa... Mercury 1993
- We Ain't Goin' Out Like That (12") Hits From The Bong (T-... Ruffhouse Records 1993
- Who's The Man? (12") Put On Your Shit Kicke... Tommy Boy Music 1993
- Wopbabalubop / Where's It At (12", Promo) Wopbabalubop (Soul Ass... Epic 1993
- City Song (CD, Maxi) City Song (Supernatura... Grand Royal 1994
- Deep Shag (12") Deep Shag (Sunny Ray Mix) Grand Royal 1994
- Kickin Da Flava (CD) Citysong (Supernatural... EMI Music (Canada) 1994
- Vibes - Strictly Hip Hop (CD) City Song (Supernatura... EMI Electrola 1994
- Wilma's Rainbow EP (CD, Maxi) Just Another Victim (L... Interscope Records 1994
- Omaha Stylee / 8:16 AM (T-Ray Mixes) (12") Capricorn Records 1995
- Unreleased & Revamped EP (CD, EP) Hits From The Bong (T-... Columbia 1996
- Go (Music From The Motion Picture) (CD) Shooting Up In Vain (T... Work 1999
- Video Anthology (2xDVD) Alive (T-Ray Remix) Capitol Records 2000
- Here To Stay (CD2) (CD, Maxi) Here To Stay (T Ray's ... Sony Music Entertainment (UK) 2002
- Untouchables (CD, Album) Here To Stay (T Ray's ... Epic 2002
- Be Yourself (CD, Maxi) Show Me How To Live (T... Interscope Records 2005
- These Words (Remixes) (12", Promo) These Words (T Ray Rem... Epic 2005

=== Appears on ===
- Back to the Grill (12") Daze In A Weak (LP Ver... Def Jam Recordings 1992
- Judgment Night (Music From The Motion Picture) (CD) Come And Die Epic 1993
- Sweet Thing (CD, Maxi) Sweet Thing (Extended ... Atlantic 1993
- We Ain't Goin' Out Like That (12") Ruffhouse Records 1993
- Wopbabalubop / Where's It At (12") Immortal Records (3) 1993
- City Song (12") City Song (Supernatura... Grand Royal 1994
- Unreleased & Revamped (EP) (CD, EP) Hits From The Bong (T-... Sony Music Entertainment (Australia) 1996
- Calvin (CD, EP) Calvin Au Go Go 1998
- Go (Music From The Motion Picture) (CD, Album) Shooting Up In Vain (T... Higher Ground, Sony Music Soundtrax 1999
- Super Bowl Sundae (12") Almo Sounds 1999
- U Can't Stop Hiphop (CD, Promo) I Ain't Going Out Like... Sony Music Media (Netherlands) 2002
- Thicker Than Water (CD) Hobo Blues, Hobo Blues Brushfire Records 2003

== Awards and nominations ==
Year	Nominee / work	Award	Result	Ref.
1999	Supernatural	Grammy Award for Album of the Year	Won	
2004	Street Signs	Grammy Award for Best Latin Rock or Alternative Album	Won	
