= Brothas Doobie =

Studio album by Funkdoobiest
- Released: July 4, 1995
- Recorded: 1994–early 1995
- Studio: Image (Hollywood, CA); Amerycan (North Hollywood, CA)
- Genre: West Coast hip hop; alternative hip hop
- Length: 47:09
- Label: Epic; Immortal
- Producer: DJ Muggs (also exec.); DJ Ralph M; DJ Lethal; Ray Roll

Funkdoobiest chronology
| Which Doobie U B? (1993) | Brothas Doobie (1995) | The Troubleshooters (1998) |

Singles from Brothas Doobie
- 1. "Rock On" Released: 1994; 2. "Dedicated" Released: 1995; 3. "XXX Funk" Released: 1995

Professional ratings
Review scores
| Source | Rating |
|---|---|
| AllMusic | 3/5 stars |
| Muzik | 3/5 stars |
| The Source | 3.5/5 stars |

Brothas Doobie is the second studio album by Los Angeles–based hip hop group Funkdoobiest. It was released on July 4, 1995, via Epic Records. This was the final album featuring back-up MC and hypeman Tomahawk Funk, who left the group after this release. The album contains the controversial track "Superhoes", which also appeared in the soundtrack to the film Friday, starring N.W.A's Ice Cube.

An edited version of the album, which removed most of its explicit language and sexual content, was also released. It completely censored the track "Superhoes", due to references to masturbation and rape, and the track "Pussy Ain't Shit" due to its main graphic theme: the female reproductive organs.

== Track listing ==
| No. | Title | Writer(s) | Producer(s) | Length |
|---|---|---|---|---|
| 1. | "This Is It" (Interlude) | L. Muggerud | DJ Muggs | 1:25 |
| 2. | "Rock On" | J. Vasquez; L. Muggerud; B. Bouldin | DJ Muggs | 3:54 |
| 3. | "What the Deal" | J. Vasquez; L. Muggerud; B. Bouldin; M. Gaye | DJ Muggs | 4:00 |
| 4. | "Lost in Thought" | J. Vasquez; L. Muggerud; R. Roll | DJ Muggs; Ray Roll | 3:39 |
| 5. | "Dedicated" | J. Vasquez; L. Muggerud; B. Bouldin | DJ Muggs | 3:34 |
| 6. | "Ka Sera Sera" | J. Vasquez; R. Medrano; B. Bouldin | DJ Ralph M | 2:58 |
| 7. | "Pussy Ain't Shit" | J. Vasquez; L. Muggerud; B. Bouldin | DJ Muggs | 4:25 |
| 8. | "XXX Funk" | J. Vasquez; R. Medrano; L. Muggerud; B. Bouldin | DJ Muggs; DJ Ralph M | 3:55 |
| 9. | "It Ain't Going Down" | J. Vasquez; L. Dimant | DJ Lethal | 3:15 |
| 10. | "You're Dummin'" | J. Vasquez; R. Medrano; L. Muggerud | DJ Ralph M | 4:23 |
| 11. | "Tomahawk Bang" | R. Medrano; T. Pacheco; S. Rosset; B. Bouldin | DJ Ralph M | 3:57 |
| 12. | "Superhoes" | J. Vasquez; R. Medrano; L. Muggerud | DJ Ralph M; DJ Muggs | 3:51 |
| 13. | "Who Ra Ra" | J. Vasquez; L. Muggerud; B. Bouldin | DJ Ralph M; DJ Muggs | 2:56 |
| Total length: | | | | 47:09 |

Sample credits

- "This Is It (Interlude)" sampled "Is It Him of Me" by Jackie Jackson, "Winter's Child" by Charles Kynard and "This Is It" from Style Wars.
- "Rock On" sampled "Why Can't People Be Colors Too?" by the Whatnauts and "Put That Record Back On" by Just-Ice.
- "What the Deal" sampled "Mercy, Mercy Me (The Ecology)" by Grover Washington, Jr.
- "Lost in Thought" sampled "Como Quisiera Decirte" by Los Angeles Negros, "Spinning Wheel" by Lonnie Smith and "School Boy Crush" by Average White Band.
- "Dedicated" sampled "Everybody Loves the Sunshine" by Roy Ayers.
- "Ka Sera Sera" sampled "Malcolm X" by Hal Singer and "Que Sera Sera (Whatever Will Be, Will Be)" by Doris Day.
- "Pussy Ain't Shit" sampled "The Soil I Tilled for You" by Shades of Brown and "Amerikkka's Most Wanted" by Ice Cube.
- "XXX Funk" sampled "Spinning Wheel" by Lonnie Smith and "School Boy Crush" by Average White Band.
- "It Ain't Going Down" sampled "(You Caught Me) Smilin'" by Sly & the Family Stone and "Jimbrowski" by Jungle Brothers.
- "Tomahawk Bang" sampled "The Adventures of the Lone Ranger - He Saves the Booneville Gold (Part 1)" by George W. Trendie, "M.P.E." by Public Enemy and "So We Will Smoke the Pipe, and There Will Be No Lies Between Us" from Thunderheart.
- "Superhoes" sampled "Get Out of My Life, Woman" by the Mad Lads and "Super Hoe" by Boogie Down Productions.
- "Who Ra Ra" sampled "Matrix" by Dizzy Gillespie.

== Personnel ==
- Jason Vasquez – main artist
- Ralph Medrano – main artist
- Tyrone Pacheco – main artist
- Sebastian Rosset – additional vocals (track 11)
- Brett Anthony Bouldin – additional vocals (track 13)
- Reggie Stewart – instruments
- Lawrence Muggerud – producer (tracks: 1–5, 7–8, 12–13), executive producer
- Leor Dimant – producer & mixing (track 9)
- Ray Cortez – producer (track 4)
- Ross Donaldson – engineering (track 9)
- Jason Roberts – mixing & recording
- Ben Wallach – additional engineering
- Joe "The Butcher" Nicolo – mastering
- Dante Ariola – art direction & design
- Jay Papke – art direction & design
- Kalynn Campbell – illustration
- Stephen Stickler – photography

== Charts ==
| Chart (1995) | Peak position |
|---|---|
| US Billboard 200 | 115 |
| US Top R&B/Hip-Hop Albums (Billboard) | 35 |
