= Billboard Year-End Hot Rap Singles of 1992 =

American music chart

This is a list of Billboard magazine's Top Hot Rap Singles of 1992.

| № | Title | Artist(s) |
|---|---|---|
| 1 | "The Phuncky Feel One" / "How I Could Just Kill a Man" | Cypress Hill |
| 2 | "They Want EFX" | Das EFX |
| 3 | "Jump" | Kris Kross |
| 4 | "Tennessee" | Arrested Development |
| 5 | "They Reminisce Over You (T.R.O.Y.)" | Pete Rock & CL Smooth |
| 6 | "Just the Two of Us" | Chubb Rock |
| 7 | "The Choice Is Yours (Revisited)" | Black Sheep |
| 8 | "Crossover" | EPMD |
| 9 | "Take It Personal" | Gang Starr |
| 10 | "People Everyday" | Arrested Development |
| 11 | "360 Degrees (What Goes Around)" | Grand Puba |
| 12 | "Oochie Coochie" | MC Brains |
| 13 | "Sometimes I Rhyme Slow" | Nice & Smooth |
| 14 | "Poor Georgie" | MC Lyte |
| 15 | "Warm It Up" | Kris Kross |
| 16 | "Mic Checka" | Das EFX |
| 17 | "Groove with It" | Big Daddy Kane |
| 18 | "Ever So Clear" | Bushwick Bill |
| 19 | "Shut 'Em Down" | Public Enemy |
| 20 | "Hand on the Pump" | Cypress Hill |
| 21 | "Don't Sweat the Technique" | Eric B. & Rakim |
| 22 | "La Schmoove" | Fu-Schnickens |
| 23 | "Helluva" | Brotherhood Creed |
| 24 | "Here It Comes" / "Back to the Grill" | MC Serch |
| 25 | "Jump Around" | House of Pain |
| 26 | "Baby Got Back" | Sir Mix-a-Lot |
| 27 | "Blow Your Mind" | Redman |
| 28 | "Victim of the Ghetto" | College Boyz |
| 29 | "The Jam" | Shabba Ranks featuring KRS-One |
| 30 | "Fakin' the Funk" | Main Source |

== See also ==
- 1992 in music
- Billboard Year-End Hot 100 singles of 1992
- Billboard Year-End Hot R&B Singles of 1992
- List of Billboard number-one rap singles of 1992
