= List of Billboard 200 number-one albums of 1993 =

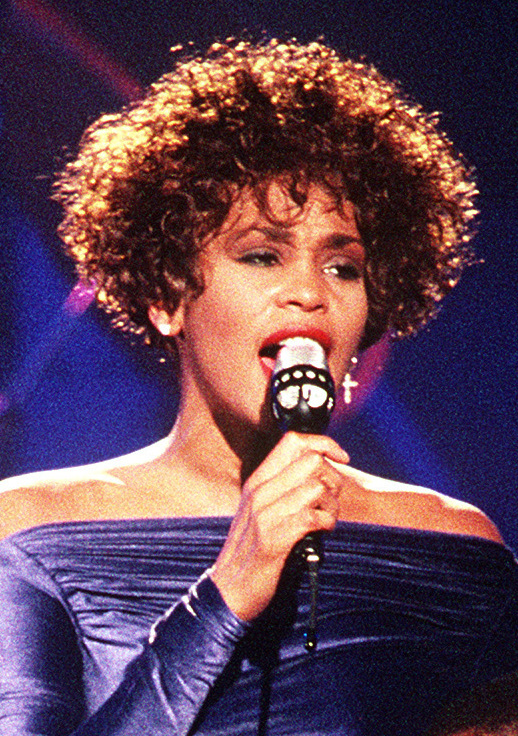
The Bodyguard soundtrack, primarily by Whitney Houston, was the best-selling album of 1993.

These are the Billboard magazine number-one albums of 1993, per the Billboard 200.

== Chart history ==
Key
†	Indicates best performing album of 1993

Issue date	Album	Artist(s)	Label	Sales	Ref.
January 2	The Bodyguard †	Whitney Houston / Soundtrack	Arista	831,000	
January 9	The Bodyguard †	Whitney Houston / Soundtrack	Arista	1,061,000	
January 16	The Bodyguard †	Whitney Houston / Soundtrack	Arista	520,000	
January 23	The Bodyguard †	Whitney Houston / Soundtrack	Arista	361,000	
January 30	The Bodyguard †	Whitney Houston / Soundtrack	Arista	264,000	
February 6	The Bodyguard †	Whitney Houston / Soundtrack	Arista	235,000	
February 13	The Bodyguard †	Whitney Houston / Soundtrack	Arista	209,000	
February 20	The Bodyguard †	Whitney Houston / Soundtrack	Arista	200,000	
February 27	The Bodyguard †	Whitney Houston / Soundtrack	Arista	200,000	
March 6	The Bodyguard †	Whitney Houston / Soundtrack	Arista	195,000	
March 13	Unplugged	Eric Clapton	Reprise	207,000	
March 20	Unplugged	Eric Clapton	Reprise	220,000	
March 27	Unplugged	Eric Clapton	Reprise	150,000	
April 3	The Bodyguard †	Whitney Houston / Soundtrack	Arista	147,000	
April 10	Songs of Faith and Devotion	Depeche Mode	Mute	150,000	
April 17	The Bodyguard †	Whitney Houston / Soundtrack	Arista	152,000	
April 24	The Bodyguard †	Whitney Houston / Soundtrack	Arista	159,000	
May 1	The Bodyguard †	Whitney Houston / Soundtrack	Arista	135,000	
May 8	Get a Grip	Aerosmith	Geffen	170,000	
May 15	The Bodyguard †	Whitney Houston / Soundtrack	Arista	105,000	
May 22	The Bodyguard †	Whitney Houston / Soundtrack	Arista	109,000	
May 29	The Bodyguard †	Whitney Houston / Soundtrack	Arista	91,000	
June 5	janet.	Janet Jackson	Virgin	350,000	
June 12	janet.	Janet Jackson	Virgin	238,000	
June 19	janet.	Janet Jackson	Virgin	177,000	
June 26	janet.	Janet Jackson	Virgin	N/A	
July 3	janet.	Janet Jackson	Virgin	N/A	
July 10	janet.	Janet Jackson	Virgin	N/A	
July 17	Back to Broadway	Barbra Streisand	Columbia	121,000	
July 24	Zooropa	U2	Island	377,000	
July 31	Zooropa	U2	Island	204,000	
August 7	Black Sunday	Cypress Hill	Ruffhouse	261,000	
August 14	Black Sunday	Cypress Hill	Ruffhouse	230,000	
August 21	Sleepless in Seattle	Soundtrack	Epic Soundtrax	149,455	
August 28	River of Dreams	Billy Joel	Columbia	232,000	
September 4	River of Dreams	Billy Joel	Columbia	173,000	
September 11	River of Dreams	Billy Joel	Columbia	156,000	
September 18	In Pieces	Garth Brooks	Liberty	404,000	
September 25	In Pieces	Garth Brooks	Liberty	315,000	
October 2	In Pieces	Garth Brooks	Liberty	230,000	
October 9	In Utero	Nirvana	DGC	180,000	
October 16	In Pieces	Garth Brooks	Liberty	151,000	
October 23	In Pieces	Garth Brooks	Liberty	125,000	
October 30	Bat Out of Hell II: Back into Hell	Meat Loaf	MCA	120,000	
November 6	Vs.	Pearl Jam	Epic Associated	950,377	
November 13	Vs.	Pearl Jam	Epic Associated	391,000	
November 20	Vs.	Pearl Jam	Epic Associated	269,000	
November 27	Vs.	Pearl Jam	Epic Associated	229,000	
December 4	Vs.	Pearl Jam	Epic Associated	189,000	
December 11	Doggystyle	Snoop Doggy Dogg	Death Row	802,858	
December 18	Doggystyle	Snoop Doggy Dogg	Death Row	378,000	
December 25	Music Box	Mariah Carey	Columbia	295,000	

== See also ==
- 1993 in music
- List of number-one albums (United States)
