= Jessica Poland =

American singer-songwriter (born 1988)

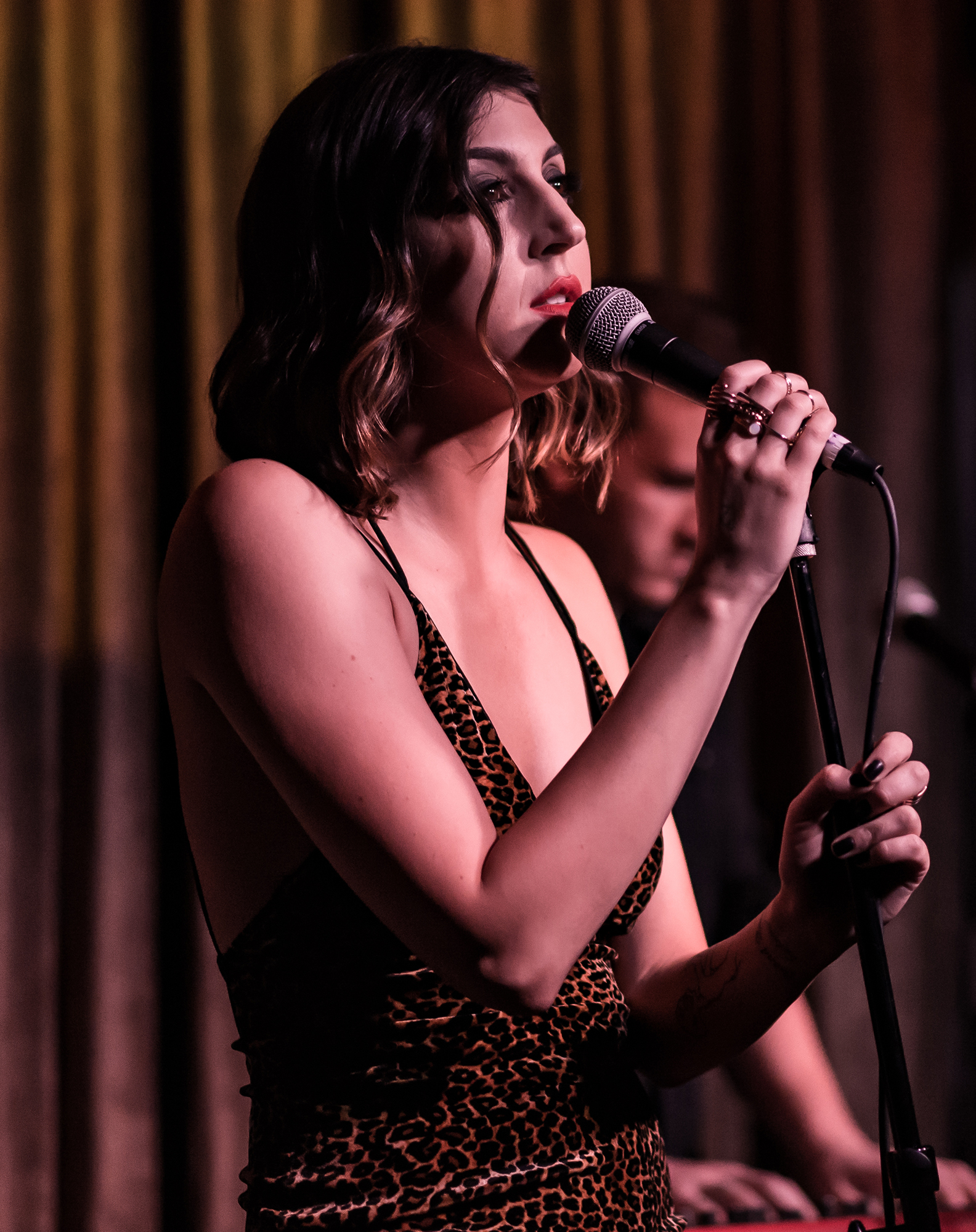
- Performing in 2016 as Laces.

Background information
- Also known as: Charlotte Sometimes, Jessica Vaughn
- Born: Jessica Charlotte Poland; January 15, 1988 (age 38)
- Origin: Wall Township, New Jersey, U.S.
- Genres: Pop; indie pop; alternative rock; EDM
- Occupations: Singer, musician, songwriter
- Instruments: Vocals, guitar
- Years active: 2007–present
- Labels: Sony/ATV

Jessica Charlotte Poland (born January 15, 1988) is an American singer-songwriter, known professionally as JPOLND, Charlotte Sometimes, and Laces. Her debut album Waves and the Both of Us was released on May 6, 2008. She has released one full-length album and five EPs. In 2014, Poland retired her stage name and started a new project called LACES.

== Early life and education ==
Poland was adopted by her parents, Hartson and Tracy Poland, as a baby. She was introduced to her birth mother at age 13.

At age 14, Poland started playing guitar and writing songs. Around the same time, she was diagnosed with condylar resorption, a rare disease causing her jaw to essentially break apart, impairing her ability to sing. By age 16, she had undergone surgery by having two ribs extracted to "rebuild her face." She continues to have injections to treat her jaw.

Raised in Wall Township, New Jersey, Poland attended Wall High School.

Poland got her first stage name from the children's book Charlotte Sometimes, written in 1969 by Penelope Farmer, about a boarding school student who finds herself transported more than 40 years into the past, into the place of another girl.

== Career ==
=== 2006 – 2008: Career beginnings and Waves and the Both of Us ===
Poland began her career playing in a five-piece band (J. Poland and The Pilots) in early 2006. The group performed around the New Brunswick, New Jersey area. They soon began playing shows in New York and graduated to larger venues, opening for artists associated with producer/songwriter, Alex Houton. Houton produced much of Poland's early work and co-wrote, produced and contributed guitar work to her major label debut.

In 2008, Poland signed to Geffen Records and released Waves and the Both of Us under the stage name Charlotte Sometimes. The album peaked at No. 145 on the Billboard 200 and No. 3 on the Billboard Top Heatseekers chart. Poland performed at all venues on the 2008 Warped Tour, and the single "How I Could Just Kill A Man", whose title was inspired by the Cypress Hill song of the same name, was featured on the Warped Tour 2008 Tour Compilation.

=== 2010 – 2014: EPs and The Voice ===
On May 14, 2010, Poland self-released a free EP entitled "Sideways." Her second EP, The Wait, was released on iTunes August 18, 2011.

In 2012, Poland was a contestant on Season 2 of NBC's The Voice. After having all four judges turn around in the blind audition round, she chose Blake Shelton as her coach. She was eliminated after the first live round. Later that year, Poland finished working on her third EP, Circus Head, which was initially made available to those who had donated to the album's PledgeMusic campaign. The lead single, "Brilliant, Broke and Beautiful," was released on October 3, 2012, with the commercial release of the EP following on October 30, 2012.

In 2013, Poland recorded her fourth (and first acoustic) Charlotte Sometimes EP, entitled "By Request." The lead single, "Magic," premiered on November 18, 2013, and the full album was released on March 4, 2014.

=== 2014 – 2016: LACES and BRZY ===
In early 2014, Poland announced she had retired her Charlotte Sometimes stage name and would now be writing and recording music under her legal name for a new project, LACES.

The first single under her new moniker, "Love Me Sober," premiered on Billboard on March 5, 2015 and was released to retailers on March 16, 2015. "Love Me Sober" was produced by Dante Jones.

A side project was announced in 2016 titled BRZY, featuring the members of District 76 and LACES. The single "Cause a Little Fire" was released digitally on October 21, 2016.

=== 2016–present: Jessica Vaughn ===
In December 2016, "Christmas for the Lonely" was released under the name Jessie Vaughn for the holiday compilation album "SoundRevolver Presents: A Holiday Benefit 2016." In early February 2017, the LACES Facebook account was renamed to "Jessica Vaughn Music."

== Discography ==
=== Studio albums ===
List of studio albums, with selected chart positions
Title	Album details	Peak chart positions	
Title	Album details	US	US Heat.
Waves and the Both of Us	Released: May 6, 2008; Format: CD, Digital download; Label: Geffen	145	3
"—" denotes releases that did not chart or were not released in that territory.

=== Extended plays ===
List of extended plays
Title	Album details
Charlotte Sometimes	Released: March 18, 2008; Label: Geffen; Format: CD, Digital download
Sideways	Released: May 14, 2010; Label: Independent; Format: Digital download
The Wait	Released: August 18, 2011; Label: Independent; Format: Digital download
Circus Head	Released: October 30, 2012; Label: Independent; Format: Digital download
By Request	Released: March 4, 2014; Label: Independent; Format: CD, Digital download

=== Singles ===
==== As Charlotte Sometimes ====
List of singles, with selected chart positions and certifications
Title	Year	Peak chart positions		Album
Title	Year	US	US Digital Rock	Album
"How I Could Just Kill a Man"	2008	—	—	Waves and the Both of Us
"Apologize"	2012	—	—	Non-album songs were released by The Voice
"Pumped Up Kicks"	2012	—	—	Non-album songs were released by The Voice
"Misery Business"	2012	—	24	Non-album songs were released by The Voice
"Brilliant Broke and Beautiful"	2012	—	—	Circus Head
"Magic"	2014	—	—	By Request
"—" denotes releases that did not chart or were not released in that territory.

==== As LACES ====
List of singles, with selected chart positions and certifications
Title	Year	Peak chart positions	Album
Title	Year	US	Album
"Love Me Sober"	2015	—	TBA
"—" denotes releases that did not chart or were not released in that territory.
