= Freakshow (TV series) =

- Genre: Documentary
- Starring: Todd Ray
- Country of origin: United States
- No. of seasons: 2
- No. of episodes: 24

Production
- Executive producers: Greg Johnston; Todd Ray
- Running time: 20 to 23 minutes (excluding commercials)
- Production companies: Endemol USA; Living Wonders

Original release
- Network: AMC
- Release: February 14, 2013 – June 24, 2014

Freakshow is an American unscripted reality documentary television series from AMC that chronicles the operations of former music producer Todd Ray's Venice Beach Freakshow. The series premiered on February 14, 2013, preceded by the mid-season premiere of Comic Book Men and followed by the series premiere of Immortalized. The show was given a greenlight along with Immortalized on August 16, 2012. It was announced in April 2013 that the series had been renewed for a second season, which premiered on May 6, 2014.

== Cast ==
- Todd Ray
- Danielle Ray
- Asia Ray
- Phoenix Ray
- Amazing Ali
- Brianna Belladonna "The Indestructible Woman"
- George Bell "The Tallest Man In America"
- Marcus "Creature"
- Dan Meyer
- Morgue
- Murrugun "The Mystic"
- Jessa "The Bearded Lady"
- Wee Matt
- Dirty Kerr
- Angeli
- Chayne Hultgren 'The Space Cowboy'

== Episodes ==
Season	Episodes	Originally released	
Season	Episodes	First released	Last released
1	8	February 14, 2013	April 4, 2013
2	16	May 6, 2014	June 24, 2014

=== Season 1 (2013) ===
No. overall	No. in season	Title	Original release date	U.S. viewers (millions)
1	1	"Two-Headed Bearded Dragon"	February 14, 2013	0.64
Todd tries to convince a living giant and a bearded lady to join The Freakshow and be a part of the two-headed bearded dragon’s birthday party.
2	2	"Swords a Plenty"	February 21, 2013	0.43
Asia attempts sword swallowing in hopes of participating in sword swallower's day. Competition between the performers heats up.
3	3	"Two-Headed Baby"	February 28, 2013	0.37
"The Lobster Boy" joins Todd on a family trip to obtain a two-headed baby.
4	4	"Human Pin Cushion"	March 7, 2013	0.40
Creature tries to reunite with his estranged five-year-old daughter. Murrugun defies the limits of the human body with his human pin cushion stunt.
5	5	"The Littlest Wedding"	March 14, 2013	0.34
Todd throws a wedding for Ali and fellow little person Matt, trying to replicate the famous Tom Thumb Wedding.
6	6	"StrongMan Competition"	March 21, 2013	0.74
Todd arranges a Strongman Competition at the Freakshow involving guests with unusual strengths. Todd's friend Billy Owen shares his unique story.
7	7	"Freaks of Nature"	March 28, 2013	0.64
Jesse the Half Man and Jim the Armless Wonder show off their abilities; Todd must make a difficult decision.
8	8	"Freakshow Festival"	April 4, 2013	0.52
Todd wants to ban the word normal; Freaks travel to Venice to support the cause and hold a parade.

=== Season 2 (2014) ===
No. overall	No. in season	Title	Original release date	U.S. viewers (millions)
9	1	"Freakshow Auditions"	May 6, 2014	N/A
Todd needs to find new performers for the show; a man with stretchy skin makes an appearance.
10	2	"Boobzilla Comes To Town"	May 6, 2014	N/A
The Amazing Boobzilla performs at the show; Ali goes through surgery.
11	3	"Tattooed Vampires"	May 13, 2014	N/A
Todd brings in people from around the world for a tattoo event; Creature considers a place to live.
12	4	"Electric Women"	May 13, 2014	N/A
Asia wants to expand her electric act by a deadly Tesla coil stunt.
13	5	"Florida Freakshow"	May 20, 2014	N/A
The Freakshow travels to Gibsonton, Fla., to learn about its rich history as a carnival town and to try to revive it with a performance.
14	6	"Lobster Family Secrets"	May 20, 2014	N/A
Asia looks for an apartment, and Todd learns a dark secret about a performer named Lobster Boy.
15	7	"Giants, Babes and Box Cutters"	May 27, 2014	N/A
Morgue attempts a bed of box cutters stunt; George searches for love.
16	8	"Hobo Wedding"	May 27, 2014	N/A
The gang tries to attend a camp-out, hobo wedding for Digger and Paige; Ali and Matt have marital issues.
17	9	"Creature's Daughter"	June 3, 2014	N/A
Creature meets his daughter face-to-face; Todd wants to throw a surprise party for Asia's 21st birthday.
18	10	"Breaking World Records"	June 3, 2014	N/A
Space Cowboy tries to break a world record; Danielle invites neighbors to dinner.
19	11	"Little Baby Fever"	June 10, 2014	N/A
Zamora the Torture King tests the skeptics; Ali and Matt consider the possibility of parenthood.
20	12	"Freaks Hanging by a Wire"	June 10, 2014	N/A
Todd holds a suspension event; Phoenix starts dating.
21	13	"Freakshow Pop-Up"	June 17, 2014	N/A
Todd tries to organize a pop-up show at a suburban mall; Short E. Dangerously visits.
22	14	"Control Freaks"	June 17, 2014	N/A
Todd wants everyone to take on new responsibilities in order to expand.
23	15	"Freakshow Magic"	June 24, 2014	N/A
Danielle and Asia argue; Todd is given a tour of the Magic Castle; Todd considers incorporating magic into the show.
24	16	"Vegas Gets Freaky"	June 24, 2014	N/A
Todd announces that he wants to open a location in Las Vegas.
