= The Phuncky Feel One =

Single by Cypress Hill

from the album Cypress Hill
- A-side: "How I Could Just Kill a Man"
- Released: 1991
- Recorded: 1991
- Genre: West Coast hip hop; Latin rap
- Length: 3:28
- Label: Ruffhouse
- Songwriters: Louis Freese; Lawrence Muggerud; Senen Reyes
- Producer: DJ Muggs

Cypress Hill singles chronology
"The Phuncky Feel One" / "How I Could Just Kill a Man" (1991)	"Hand on the Pump" (1991)

Music video
- "The Phuncky Feel One" on YouTube

"The Phuncky Feel One" is the second single of rap group Cypress Hill's self-titled debut album. It was released in 1991 as Double A-Side single alongside "How I Could Just Kill a Man". The two songs topped the Billboard Hot Rap Singles chart and were collectively the top rap singles of 1992, taking the top spot on the Billboard Year-End Hot Rap Singles of 1992.

An extended version of this track appears on the UK CD single of "When the Shit Goes Down".

== Track listing ==
No.	Title	Length
1.	"The Phuncky Feel One" (Extended Version)	4:59
2.	"The Phuncky Feel One" (LP Version)	3:28
3.	"The Phuncky Feel One" (instrumental)	3:28

== Charts ==
Chart	Peak position
US	77
US Rap	1
