= Waves and the Both of Us =

Studio album by Charlotte Sometimes
- Released: May 6, 2008
- Recorded: Winter 2007
- Genres: Indie pop, pop rock, alternative rock
- Length: 40:13
- Label: Geffen
- Producer: S*A*M & Sluggo

Charlotte Sometimes chronology
Waves and the Both of Us (2008)	Sideways (2010)

Waves and the Both of Us is the debut album by Charlotte Sometimes. It was released on May 6, 2008.

== Reception ==
Professional ratings
Review scores
Source	Rating
AllMusic	4/5 stars
Entertainment Weekly	B+
Sputnikmusic	3.5/5

The album received positive reviews, drawing frequent comparisons to Fiona Apple.

== Track listing ==
1. "Losing Sleep" - (Charlotte Sometimes) 3:50
2. "How I Could Just Kill a Man" - (Sam Hollander, Dave Katz, Sometimes) 2:53
3. "Waves and the Both of Us" - (Hollander, Katz, Sometimes) – 3:36
4. "Sweet Valium High" - (Hollander, Katz, Sometimes) – 2:40
5. "Ex Girlfriend Syndrome" - (Sometimes) – 3:09
6. "AEIOU" – (Hollander, Katz, Sometimes) 3:10
7. "Toy Soldier" – (Hollander, Katz, Sometimes) 2:55
8. "This Is Only for Now" – (Hollander, Katz, Sometimes) 2:54
9. "In Your Apartment" – (Sometimes) 3:54
10. "Army Men" – (Sometimes) 3:34
11. "Build the Moon" - (Sometimes) 4:17
12. "Pilot" - (Alex Houton, Sometimes) 3:14
13. "Losing Sleep (Acoustic) [iTunes Bonus Track]" - (Charlotte Sometimes) 3:50
14. "How I Could Just Kill a Man (Acoustic) [iTunes Bonus Track]" –(Sam Hollander, Dave Katz, Sometimes) 2:53

The song "How I Could Just Kill a Man" was named after the 1991 Cypress Hill song of the same name.

== Personnel ==
- Charlotte Sometimes (Jessica Charlotte Poland) – Lead vocals, guitar, songwriting
- Coley O'Toole– Keyboards, backing vocals
- Spencer Peterson – Drums
- PJ Bond – Guitar
- Shaun Savage – Bass

== Charts ==
Chart (2008)	Peak position
US Billboard 200	145
US Billboard Top Heatseekers	3
