= The Future Is Now =

- The Future Is Now (Platinum Edition) cover art

Studio album by Non Phixion
- Released: March 26, 2002
- Studio: Fast Forward Studios (New York, NY); D&D Studios (New York, NY); No Mystery Studios (New York, NY); Battery Studios (New York, NY); Area 51 (Brooklyn, NY); Chung King House Of Metal (New York, NY); Music Grinder Studios (Los Angeles, CA)
- Genre: Hardcore hip-hop
- Length: 56:02
- Label: Uncle Howie; Landspeed
- Producer: Dave One; DJ Premier; JuJu; Large Professor; Necro; Non Phixion; Pete Rock; T-Ray

Non Phixion chronology
The Future Is Now (2002)	The Green CD/DVD (2004)

Ill Bill chronology
The Future Is Now (2002)	What's Wrong with Bill? (2004)

Sabac Red chronology
The Future Is Now (2002)	Sabacolypse: A Change Gon' Come (2004)

Goretex chronology
The Future Is Now (2002)	The Art of Dying (2004)

Singles from The Future Is Now
- 1. "Black Helicopters" Released: 2000; 2. "Rock Stars" Released: 2002; 3. "Drug Music" Released: 2002

Professional ratings
Review scores
Source	Rating
AllMusic	4.5/5 stars
Pitchfork	4.6/10
RapReviews	9/10

The Future Is Now is the only studio album by the American hip-hop group Non Phixion. It was released on March 26, 2002, via Uncle Howie/Landspeed Records. Recording sessions took place at Fast Forward Studios, D&D Studios, No Mystery Studios, Battery Studios, Area 51 and Chung King House Of Metal in New York, and at the Music Grinder in Los Angeles. Production was handled by Necro, Large Professor, Dave 1, DJ Premier, JuJu, Pete Rock and T-Ray. It features guest appearances from Christian Olde Wolbers, Marley Metal, MF Doom, Moonshine, Necro, Raymond Herrera, Stephen Carpenter and The Beatnuts. The album's cover art was created by Mear One, and the logo is a tribute to Canadian metal band Voivod.

The album reached number 65 on the Top R&B/Hip-Hop Albums chart and number 14 on both the Independent Albums and the Heatseekers Albums charts in the United States. It includes the singles "Black Helicopters", "Drug Music" backed with "If You Got Love", and "Rock Stars" backed with "The C.I.A. Is Trying to Kill Me". "Black Helicopters" was the only charting single from the album, peaking at No. 46 on the Hot Rap Songs chart. A double disc Platinum Edition of the album was released in 2004, with the second disc featuring instrumental versions. The remix of the song "Say Goodbye to Yesterday" was included in 2003 Biker Boyz: Music from the Motion Picture.

== Track listing ==
No.	Title	Writer(s)	Producer(s)	Length
1.	"Futurama"	William Braunstein; Mitchell Manzanilla; Ron Braunstein	Necro	4:07
2.	"Drug Music"	W. Braunstein; John Fuentes; Manzanilla; William Paul Mitchell	Large Professor	3:28
3.	"The C.I.A. Is Trying to Kill Me"	W. Braunstein; Fuentes; Manzanilla; R. Braunstein	Necro	4:21
4.	"If You Got Love"	Manzanilla; W. Braunstein; Pete Phillips	Pete Rock	3:50
5.	"There Is No Future" (featuring Necro)	W. Braunstein; R. Braunstein; Manzanilla; Fuentes	Necro	4:09
6.	"Uncle Howie"		Non Phixion	1:00
7.	"Rock Stars"	Manzanilla; W. Braunstein; Fuentes; Chris Martin	DJ Premier	3:59
8.	"Say Goodbye to Yesterday"	Fuentes; Manzanilla; R. Braunstein	Necro	3:56
9.	"Black Helicopters"	W. Braunstein; Manzanilla; Fuentes; R. Braunstein	Necro	4:07
10.	"Strange Universe" (featuring MF Doom)	W. Braunstein; Daniel Dumile; Manzanilla; R. Braunstein	Necro	2:05
11.	"Cult Leader"	W. Braunstein; David Macklovitch	Dave One	4:08
12.	"It's Us"	W. Braunstein; Manzanilla; Fuentes; Mitchell	Large Professor	3:58
13.	"Suicide Bomb" (featuring The Beatnuts, Marley Metal and Moonshine)	W. Braunstein; Jerry Tineo; Marley Fernandez; Lester Fernandez; J. Moronta; Manzanilla; Fuentes; Berntony Smalls	JuJu	3:33
14.	"Where You Wanna Go"		Non Phixion	0:27
15.	"We Are the Future"	W. Braunstein; Manzanilla; Fuentes; Mitchell	Large Professor	4:15
16.	"The C.I.A. Is Still Trying to Kill Me" (featuring Stephen Carpenter, Christian Olde Wolbers and Raymond Herrera)	W. Braunstein; Fuentes; Manzanilla; Stephen Carpenter; Christian Olde Wolbers; Raymond Herrera; Todd Ray; R. Braunstein	T-Ray; Necro	4:39
Total length:				56:02

Platinum Edition instrumentals
No.	Title	Producer(s)	Length
17.	"Futurama"	Necro	4:07
18.	"Drug Music"	Large Professor	3:28
19.	"The C.I.A. Is Trying to Kill Me"	Necro	4:21
20.	"If You Got Love"	Pete Rock	3:50
21.	"There Is No Future"	Necro	4:09
22.	"Rock Stars"	DJ Premier	4:00
23.	"Say Goodbye to Yesterday"	Necro	3:55
24.	"Black Helicopters"	Necro	4:07
25.	"Strange Universe"	Necro	2:05
26.	"Cult Leader"	Dave One	4:08
27.	"It's Us"	Large Professor	3:58
28.	"Suicide Bomb"	JuJu	3:33
29.	"We Are the Future"	Large Professor	4:15
30.	"The C.I.A. Is Still Trying to Kill Me" (featuring Stephen Carpenter, Christian Olde Wolbers and Raymond Herrera)	T-Ray; Necro	4:39

== Personnel ==
- Non Phixion — producers & recording (tracks: 6, 14), mixing (tracks: 1, 5, 6, 9, 12, 14, 16), art direction
  - William "Ill Bill" Braunstein — vocals (tracks: 1–5, 7, 9–13, 15, 16), mixing (tracks: 11, 13), executive producer
  - Mitchell "Goretex" Manzanilla — vocals (tracks: 1–5, 7–10, 12, 13, 15, 16), recording (track 10)
  - John "Sabac Red" Fuentes — vocals (tracks: 2, 3, 5, 7–9, 12, 13, 15, 16), mixing (track 13)
  - Eric "DJ Eclipse" Winn — scratches (tracks: 2, 15)

Guest musicians

- Peter "Pete Rock" Phillips — backing vocals, scratches, producer & mixing (track 4)
- Ron "Necro" Braunstein — rap vocals (track 5), producer (tracks: 1, 3, 5, 8–10, 16), mixing (tracks: 3, 8, 10)
- Cenophia Mitchell — additional vocals (track 8)
- Daniel "MF Doom" Dumile — rap vocals (track 10)
- Jerry "JuJu" Tineo — rap vocals & producer (track 13)
- Marley "Marley Metal" Fernandez — rap vocals (track 13)
- Lester "Psycho Les" Fernandez — rap vocals (track 13)
- J. "Moonshine" Moronta — rap vocals (track 13)
- Berntony "Al' Tariq" Smalls — rap vocals (track 13)
- Christopher "DJ Premier" Martin — scratches, producer & mixing (track 7)
- Alain "A-Trak" Macklovitch — scratches (track 11)
- Stephen Carpenter — guitar (track 16)
- Christian Olde Wolbers — bass (track 16)
- Raymond Herrera — drums (track 16)

Production

- William "Large Professor" Mitchell — producer (tracks: 2, 12, 15), mixing (tracks: 2, 15)
- David "Dave 1" Macklovitch — producer & mixing (track 11)
- Todd Ray — producer (track 16)
- Bones — recording (tracks: 1, 5, 11)
- Dejuann Richardson — recording (track 2)
- Jeff Abell — recording (tracks: 3, 6, 8, 9, 12, 14), mixing (tracks: 6, 14)
- Charles McCrorey — recording (track 4)
- Eddie Sancho — recording (track 7), mixing (track 9)
- M. "10K" Sutain — recording (track 9)
- Chris Conway — recording (track 13), mixing (tracks: 1, 5, 11–13, 16)
- Anton Pukshansky — recording (track 16)
- Jamie Staub — mixing (tracks: 2–4, 8, 10, 15)
- Kevin Hodge — mastering
- Henley Halem — executive producer, management

Artwork

- Trevor "Karma" Gendron — art direction, design, layout
- Kalen "Mear One" Ockerman — artwork, design, painting
- Ricky Powell — photography
- Michael Lavine — photography
- Michael Benabib — photography

== Charts ==
Chart (2002)	Peak position
US Top R&B/Hip-Hop Albums (Billboard)	65
US Independent Albums (Billboard)	14
US Heatseekers Albums (Billboard)	14
