= Which Doobie U B? =

Studio album by Funkdoobiest
- Released: May 4, 1993
- Recorded: 1991–1992
- Studios: 38 Fresh (Los Angeles, CA); Echo Sound (Los Angeles, CA); Image (Hollywood, CA); Soundtrack (New York City, NY)
- Genres: West Coast hip hop; alternative hip hop
- Length: 39:37
- Labels: Epic; Immortal; Buzz Tone Entertainment; SME
- Producers: DJ Ralph M; T-Ray; DJ Muggs; DJ Lethal

Funkdoobiest chronology
Which Doobie U B? (1993)	Brothas Doobie (1995)

Singles from Which Doobie U B?
- 1. "Bow Wow Wow" Released: 1992; 2. "The Funkiest / Freak Mode" Released: 1993; 3. "Wopbabalubop / Where's It At" Released: 1993

Which Doobie U B? is the debut studio album by Los Angeles–based hip hop group Funkdoobiest. It was released on May 4, 1993, via Epic Records. The album peaked at number 56 on the US Billboard 200 chart.

The album title comes from a line in an episode of the 1970s sitcom, What's Happening!!, when the main character, Raj, is introduced to special guests the Doobie Brothers.

== Critical reception ==
Professional ratings
Review scores
Source	Rating
AllMusic	4.5/5 stars
RapReviews	7/10
The Source	3/5 stars

The Los Angeles Times wrote: "Despite some inviting musical tracks, Funkdoobiest's drone of dissin' and tireless display of bravado dampens its debut." Minya Oh of The Source thought the group lacked originality, "sound[ing] just like House of Pain [...] and Cypress Hill". She concluded: "With pop culture references and cliches thrown together their style really makes no kinda sense most of the time".

== Track listing ==
No.	Title	Writer(s)	Producer(s)	Length
1.	"The Funkiest"	J. Vasquez; L. Dimant; L. Muggerud	DJ Muggs; DJ Lethal	3:22
2.	"Bow Wow Wow"	J. Vasquez; L. Dimant; L. Muggerud	DJ Muggs; DJ Lethal	4:13
3.	"Freak Mode"	J. Vasquez; R. Medrano	DJ Ralph M	3:27
4.	"I'm Shittin' on 'Em"	J. Vasquez; T. Ray; A. Toussaint	T-Ray	4:02
5.	"Who's the Doobiest"	J. Vasquez; T. Ray	T-Ray	2:52
6.	"Doobie to the Head"	J. Vasquez; R. Medrano	DJ Ralph M	3:28
7.	"Where's It At"	J. Vasquez; T. Ray; T. Pacheco	T-Ray	3:40
8.	"Wopbabalubop" (featuring B-Real)	J. Vasquez; L. Freeze; T. Ray; D. LaBostrie; R. Penniman	T-Ray	3:43
9.	"The Porno King"	J. Vasquez; R. Medrano	DJ Ralph M	0:26
10.	"'Uh C'mon Yeah!"	J. Vasquez; R. Medrano	DJ Ralph M	3:17
11.	"Here I Am"	R. Medrano; T. Pacheco	DJ Ralph M	3:51
12.	"Funk's on Me"	J. Vasquez; R. Medrano; S. Hollister	DJ Ralph M	3:13
Total length:				39:37

== Personnel ==
- Jason Vasquez – main artist
- Ralph Medrano – main artist
- Tyrone Pacheco – main artist
- Louis Freese – featured artist (track 8)
- Richard Todd Ray – producer (tracks: 4, 5, 7, 8)
- Lawrence Muggerud – producer (tracks: 1, 2)
- Leor Dimant – producer (tracks: 1, 2)
- Jason Roberts – mixing (tracks: 1, 3, 6, 8, 12), recording (tracks: 1, 2, 6, 12)
- Rich July – mixing (tracks: 5, 7)
- Mike Calderon – mixing (tracks: 9, 10), recording (track 9)
- Joe "The Butcher" Nicolo – mixing (track 2)
- Chris Shaw – mixing and recording (track 4)
- Mike Wallach – mixing and recording (track 11)
- Anton Pukshansky – recording (tracks: 5, 7, 8)
- Mike Green – recording (tracks: 3, 10)
- Dante Ariola – art direction and design
- Glenn Barr – illustration
- Annalisa – photography
- Pawn Shop Press – art direction and design

== Charts ==
Chart (1993)	Peak position
US Billboard 200	56
US Top R&B/Hip-Hop Albums (Billboard)	19
