= Cypress Hill (album) =

Studio album by Cypress Hill
- Released: August 13, 1991
- Recorded: August 1990 – May 1991
- Studio: Image Recording (Los Angeles)
- Genres: West Coast hip hop; Gangsta rap; Latin hip hop
- Length: 46:54
- Labels: Ruffhouse; Columbia
- Producer: DJ Muggs

Cypress Hill chronology
Cypress Hill (1991)	Something for the Blunted (1992)

Singles from Cypress Hill
- 1. "The Phuncky Feel One" / "How I Could Just Kill a Man" Released: July 11, 1991; 2. "Hand on the Pump" Released: 1991; 3. "Latin Lingo" Released: 1992

Cypress Hill is the debut studio album by American hip hop group Cypress Hill. It was released through Ruffhouse and Columbia Records on August 13, 1991. The recording sessions were held at Image Recording Studios in Los Angeles from August 1990 to May 1991. The album was produced by DJ Muggs. The album was critically and commercially successful and received major airplay on urban and college radio. The album went double platinum, with over 2 million units sold, in the United States.

== Critical reception ==
Professional ratings
Review scores
Source	Rating
AllMusic	5/5 stars
Entertainment Weekly	A+
Los Angeles Times	3/4 stars
Mojo	5/5 stars
NME	8/10
Rolling Stone	3/5 stars
The Rolling Stone Album Guide	4.5/5 stars
The Source	4/5 stars
Spin Alternative Record Guide	9/10
The Village Voice	A−

Steve Huey of AllMusic calls Cypress Hill's debut "a sonic blueprint that would become one of the most widely copied in hip-hop."

In 1998, the album was selected as one of The Source's 100 Best Rap Albums. The album was included in the book 1001 Albums You Must Hear Before You Die. In 2007, the members of Cypress Hill broke the album down track-by-track in the book Check the Technique: Liner Notes for Hip-Hop Junkies.

Rolling Stone called it "an album that is innovative and engaging in spite of its hard-core messages."

- Included in Rolling Stone's "Essential Recordings of the 90's".
- Ranked No. 57 in Spin's "90 Greatest Albums of the '90s".
- Included in Q's "90 Best Albums of the 1990s".

== Track listing ==
All tracks produced by DJ Muggs.

No.	Title	Writer(s)	Length
1.	"Pigs"	Lawrence Muggerud; Louis Freese	2:51
2.	"How I Could Just Kill a Man"	Muggerud; Freese; Senen Reyes	4:16
3.	"Hand on the Pump"	Muggerud; Freese; Brett Bouldin	4:03
4.	"Hole in the Head"	Muggerud; Freese	3:33
5.	"Ultraviolet Dreams"	Muggerud	0:41
6.	"Light Another"	Muggerud; Freese	3:17
7.	"The Phuncky Feel One"	Muggerud; Freese; Reyes	3:28
8.	"Break It Up"	Muggerud	1:07
9.	"Real Estate"	Muggerud; Freese; Reyes	3:45
10.	"Stoned Is the Way of the Walk"	Muggerud; Freese	2:46
11.	"Psycobetabuckdown"	Muggerud; Freese	2:59
12.	"Something for the Blunted"	Muggerud	1:15
13.	"Latin Lingo"	Muggerud; Freese; Reyes	3:58
14.	"The Funky Cypress Hill Shit"	Muggerud; Freese	4:01
15.	"Tres Equis"	Muggerud; Reyes	1:54
16.	"Born to Get Busy"	Muggerud; Reyes	3:00

== Personnel ==
- B-Real – vocals
- Sen Dog – vocals
- DJ Muggs – arranger, producer, mixing
- Joe Nicolo – engineer, executive Producer, mixing
- Jason Roberts – engineer
- Chris Schwartz – executive Producer
- Howie Weinberg – mastering
- Ponch – various percussions
- Mike Miller – photography

== Charts ==
=== Weekly charts ===
Year	Album	Chart positions		
Year	Album	Billboard 200	Top R&B/Hip Hop Albums	Top Heatseekers
1991	Cypress Hill	#31	#4	#5

=== Singles ===
Year	Song	Chart positions			
Year	Song	Billboard Hot 100	Hot R&B/Hip-Hop Singles & Tracks	Hot Rap Singles	Hot Dance Music/Maxi-Singles Sales
1991	"Hand On The Pump"	–	#49	#2	–
1991	"How I Could Just Kill A Man"	#77	–	–	–
1991	"Latin Lingo"	–	–	#12	#44
1991	"The Phuncky Feel One/How I Could Just Kill A Man"	–	–	#1	–

== Certifications ==
Region	Certification	Certified units/sales
United Kingdom (BPI)	Gold	100,000^{*}
United States (RIAA)	2× Platinum	2,000,000^{^}
^{*} Sales figures based on certification alone.^{^} Shipments figures based on certification alone.
