= Bow Wow Wow (song) =

1992 single by Funkdoobiest

Single by Funkdoobiest

from the album Which Doobie U B?
- Released: 1992
- Genre: West Coast hip hop
- Length: 4:14
- Label: Epic; Immortal; Buzz Tone Entertainment; SME
- Songwriters: Jason Vasquez; Lawrence Muggerud; Leor Dimant
- Producers: DJ Muggs; DJ Lethal

Funkdoobiest singles chronology
"Bow Wow Wow" (1992)	"The Funkiest" (1992)

Music video
- "Bow Wow Wow" on YouTube

"Bow Wow Wow" is the debut single by American hip hop group Funkdoobiest, released in 1992. It is the lead single from their debut studio album, Which Doobie U B? (1993), and the group's most successful song. The song was produced by DJ Muggs and DJ Lethal.

== Background ==
The cover art of the single was designed by Glenn L. Barr, who also illustrated the cover of Which Doobie U B?. The song is solely performed by Son Doobie; Tomahawk Funk is absent in it but appears in the music video.

== Composition ==
The song contains a sample of "Atomic Dog" by George Clinton. Complex described the song as an "unabashed hybrid" of "What's My Name?" by Snoop Dogg and "Jump Around" by House of Pain. In the lyrics, Son Doobie calls himself a "good speller" that "gets retarded like Helen Keller", and also compares himself to Tina Turner, Barney Rubble, Sigourney Weaver, Colt Seavers, Fire Marshall Bill, Harry Houdini and Tonto.

== Critical reception ==
Complex and The Ringer included the song in their respective lists of the 100 and 101 best L.A. rap songs. "Bow Wow Wow" was also featured on Los Angeles Times' list of DJ Muggs' best beats.

== Charts ==
Chart (1993–1994)	Peak position
UK Singles (OCC)	34
US Billboard Hot 100	89
US Dance Club Songs (Billboard)	16
US Hot R&B/Hip-Hop Songs (Billboard)	98
US Maxi-Singles Sales (Billboard)	3
