= F. Gary Gray =

American film director

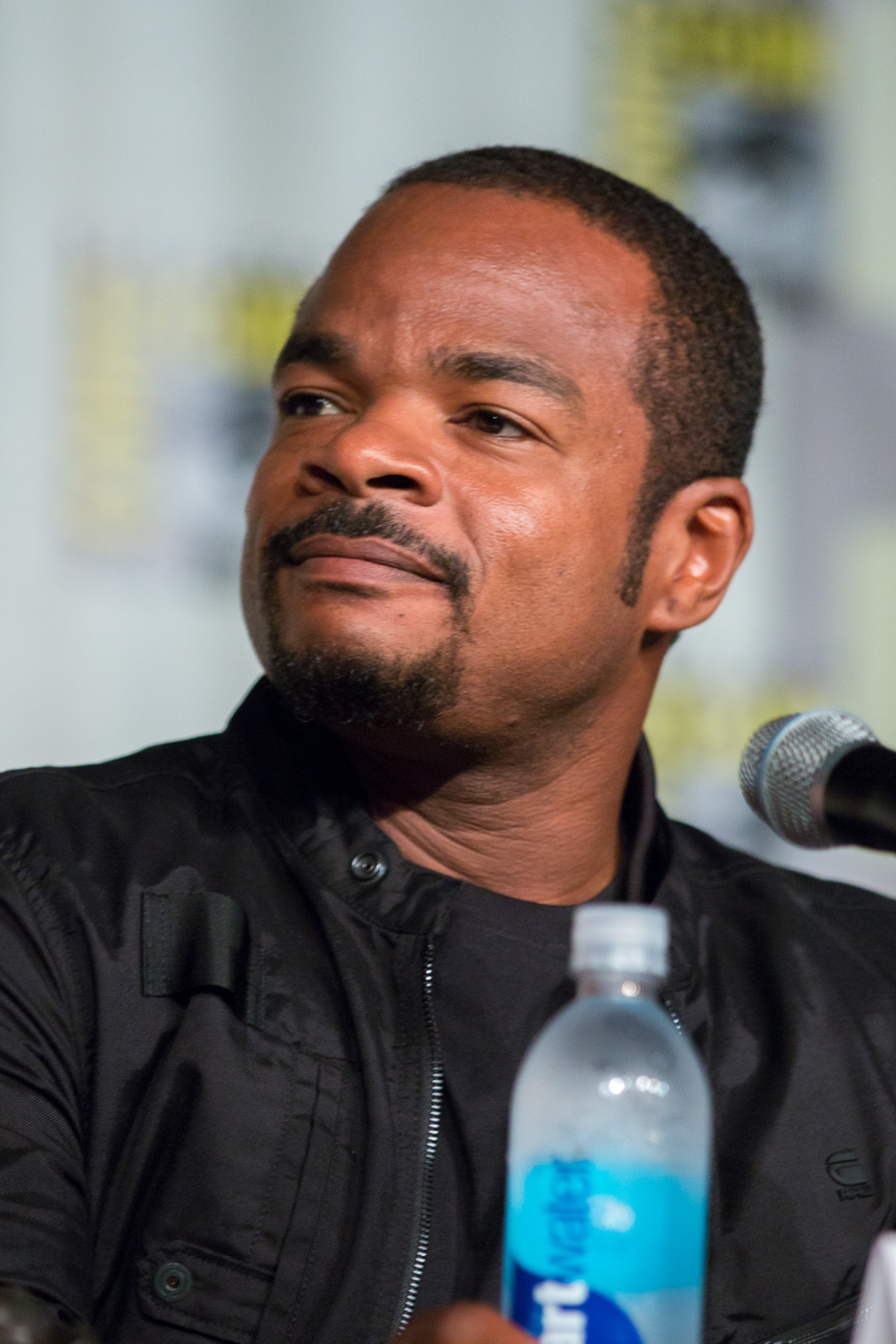
- Gray at San Diego Comic-Con in 2015
- Born: Felix Gary Gray; July 17, 1969 (age 56); New York City, U.S.
- Other name: Gary Gray
- Occupations: Film director; film producer; music video director
- Years active: 1988–present

Felix Gary Gray (born July 17, 1969) is an American director and producer. Gray began his career as a director on numerous critically acclaimed and award-winning music videos, including "It Was a Good Day" by Ice Cube, "Natural Born Killaz" by Dr. Dre and Ice Cube, "Keep Their Heads Ringin'" by Dr. Dre, "Waterfalls" by TLC, and "Ms. Jackson" by Outkast.

Gray made his feature film directorial debut with the comedy Friday (1995). He has since directed the films Set It Off (1996), The Negotiator (1998), The Italian Job (2003), Be Cool (2005), Law Abiding Citizen (2009), and Straight Outta Compton (2015). He also directed the eighth installment of the Fast & Furious franchise, The Fate of the Furious (2017), which is one of the highest-grossing films of all time.

== Career ==
In high school, Gray laid out a plan to work in the film industry as an assistant and direct his first feature by age 45. He started working as soon as he left high school, first as a camera operator on programs such as Screen Scene. He had a bit part in the 1989 comedy Major League. He got his first chance to direct with music videos, starting with a video for the hip-hop group WC and the Maad Circle (WC was a former classmate of his). In 1993, he directed the music video for Ice Cube's "It Was a Good Day". The video is a literal adaptation of the lyrics. He would go on to direct subsequent videos for Ice Cube, as well as artists such as Cypress Hill, Outkast, Dr. Dre, and Queen Latifah. At age 26, Gray directed his first film, the buddy stoner comedy Friday with rapper-producer Ice Cube (who co-wrote the film based on his experiences in Los Angeles) and Chris Tucker. Next, he directed the film Set It Off, with Jada Pinkett and Queen Latifah. He then directed The Negotiator, which starred Kevin Spacey and Samuel L. Jackson; the film earned Gray Best Film and Best Director awards at the 1998 Acapulco Film Festival.

Gray directed The Italian Job, a 2003 action-thriller starring Charlize Theron and Mark Wahlberg. Gray garnered the Best Director award at the 2004 Black American Film Festival for his work on the film, which surpassed the $100 million mark in the domestic box office. His next film was A Man Apart, an action thriller starring Vin Diesel. He would later direct Be Cool, an adaptation of Elmore Leonard's novel of the same name. The John Travolta vehicle was panned by critics but grossed over $95 million worldwide.

He then directed the thriller Law Abiding Citizen, starring Jamie Foxx and Gerard Butler and written by Kurt Wimmer. The film grossed over $100 million worldwide. Gray received the Ivan Dixon Award of Achievement from the Black Hollywood Education and Resource Center and was named one of the "50 Best and Brightest African Americans Under 40" by Black Enterprise magazine. He was honored by the African American Film Critics Association with their 2004 Special Achievement Award and was recognized by the Artist Empowerment Coalition with the Artist Empowerment Award that same year. He also received the Pioneer Director award from the Pan-African Film and Arts Festival in 2010.

Gray directed the 2015 drama Straight Outta Compton, a biographical film about the rap group N.W.A. In 2017, Gray directed The Fate of the Furious, the eighth film in the Fast & Furious franchise, which was released on April 14, 2017. Both films set the record for the best opening by an African-American director; The Fate of the Furious became the first film directed by an African-American to gross more than $1 billion.

Gray was given a star on the Hollywood Walk of Fame on May 28, 2019. During the next month, his film Men in Black: International was released.

In April 2019, it was revealed that Gray would direct an adaptation of the video game franchise Saints Row, with a screenplay written by Greg Russo. In September 2021, it was announced that he would direct the heist film Lift starring Kevin Hart for Netflix.

== Filmography ==
=== Film ===
Year	Title	Director	Producer
1995	Friday	Yes	No
1996	Set It Off	Yes	Executive
1998	The Negotiator	Yes	No
2003	A Man Apart	Yes	Executive
2003	The Italian Job	Yes	No
2005	Be Cool	Yes	Executive
2009	Law Abiding Citizen	Yes	No
2015	The Sea of Trees	No	Yes
2015	Straight Outta Compton	Yes	Yes
2017	The Fate of the Furious	Yes	No
2019	Men in Black: International	Yes	No
2024	Lift	Yes	Executive

Cameo roles

Year	Title	Role
1988	Coming to America	Front row audience member at event
1989	Major League	Indians fan in the city
1995	Friday	Man at store with mop
1996	Set It Off	Gangster driving lowrider
2009	Law Abiding Citizen	Detective with evidence bag
2015	Straight Outta Compton	Greg Mack

=== Television ===
Year	Title	Notes
1999	Ryan Caulfield: Year One	Episode "Pilot"
2006	Enemies	Episode "Pilot"

=== Music videos ===
Year	Title	Artist
1992	"True to the Game"	Ice Cube
1993	"It Was a Good Day"	Ice Cube
1993	"Call Me a Mack"	Usher
1993	"You Don't Have to Worry"	Mary J. Blige
1993	"I Ain't Goin' Out Like That"	Cypress Hill
1993	"When the Ship Goes Down"	Cypress Hill
1993	"Truthful"	Heavy D
1993	"Fantastic Voyage"	Coolio
1994	"Natural Born Killaz"	Dr. Dre; Ice Cube
1994	"Saturday Nite Live"	Masta Ace Incorporated
1994	"Southernplayalisticadillacmuzik"	OutKast
1994	"Black Hand Side"	Queen Latifah
1995	"Keep Their Heads Ringin'"	Dr. Dre
1995	"Pretty Girl"	Jon B.
1995	"Come On"	Barry White
1995	"I Believe in You and Me"	Whitney Houston
1995	"Waterfalls"	TLC
1995	"Diggin' on You"	TLC
1996	"How Come, How Long"	Babyface
1999	"If I Could Turn Back the Hands of Time"	R. Kelly
2000	"Ms. Jackson"	OutKast
2004	"Bang Bang Boom"	Drag-On
2006	"Show Me What You Got"	Jay-Z
2010	"Super High"	Rick Ross
