= I Ain't Goin' Out Like That =

Single by Cypress Hill

from the album Black Sunday
- Released: December 7, 1993
- Genre: Alternative hip hop; West Coast hip hop; horrorcore
- Length: 4:27 (album version); 4:03 (radio edit)
- Label: Ruffhouse; Columbia
- Songwriters: Geezer Butler; Louis Freese; Tony Iommi; Lawrence Muggerud; Ozzy Osbourne; Richard Todd Ray; Bill Ward
- Producer: T-Ray

Cypress Hill singles chronology
"When the Shit Goes Down" (1993)	"I Ain't Goin' Out Like That" (1993)	"Lick a Shot" (1994)

Music video
- ”I Ain't Goin' Out Like That on YouTube

"I Ain't Goin' Out Like That" is a song by American hip hop group Cypress Hill, released in December 1993, by Ruffhouse and Columbia Records, as the third single from their second studio album, Black Sunday (1993). During a scheduled Saturday Night Live performance, the song was cut short and the group was banned after DJ Muggs lit up a cannabis joint on-air just before the song. It contains a sample of the opening bars (played on a harmonica) from Black Sabbath's song "The Wizard". It was revealed that the band was high on mushrooms when this final track of the album was recorded.

== Critical reception ==
Pete Stanton from Smash Hits gave "We Ain't Goin' Out Like That" a score of four out of five, adding, "This tune is more pumping beats and jump-up-and-down raps."

== Cover versions ==
In 1996, the song was covered by 16Volt for the electro-industrial various artists compilation Operation Beatbox.

== In popular culture ==
"We Ain't Goin' Out Like That" was used in the superhero film Blue Beetle.

== Track listing ==
No.	Title	Length
1.	"We Ain't Goin' Out Like That"	4:27
2.	"We Ain't Goin' Out Like That" (radio edit)	4:03
3.	"We Ain't Goin' Out Like That" (instrumental)	4:27
4.	"Hits from the Bong"	2:41
5.	"Hits from the Bong" (T-Ray remix)	3:29
6.	"Scooby Doo"	3:39
Total length:		20:46

== Charts ==
=== Weekly charts ===
Chart (1994)	Peak position
Australia (ARIA)	43
Canada Retail Singles (The Record)	16
Ireland (IRMA)	19
Sweden (Sverigetopplistan)	6
UK Singles (OCC)	15
UK Airplay (Music Week)	38
UK Dance (Music Week)	1
UK Club Chart (Music Week)	41
US Billboard Hot 100	65
US Dance Singles Sales (Billboard)	21
US Hot R&B/Hip-Hop Songs (Billboard)	86
US Cash Box Top 100	89

=== Year-end charts ===
Chart (1994)	Position
New Zealand (Recorded Music NZ)	44

== Credits and personnel ==
- B-Real – vocals
- Sen Dog – vocals
- DJ Muggs – arranger, executive producer, mixing, scratching/turntables
- T-Ray – production
