= Funkdoobiest =

American hip hop group

- Origin: Los Angeles, California, U.S.
- Genres: Hip hop
- Years active: 1989–2009
- Labels: Immortal; Epic; RCA; BMG; Funkdoobiest Music
- Spinoff of: Soul Assassins
- Past members: Son Doobie; DJ Ralph M the Mexican; Tomahawk Funk

Funkdoobiest was an American hip hop group from Los Angeles, California, composed of rappers Jason "Son Doobie" Vasquez, Tyrone "Tomahawk Funk" Pacheco and DJ Ralph "Tha Phunky Mexican" Medrano. They were part the of Soul Assassins collective. The group has released four studio albums. Their third LP, The Troubleshooters, was recorded and released without any participation of Tomahawk Funk due to his departure from the group.

The group's most successful hit single, "Bow Wow Wow" from their debut album Which Doobie U B?, peaked at number 89 on the Billboard Hot 100 singles chart in the United States. They appeared on the 1994 soundtrack to Allison Anders' film Mi Vida Loca with the song "The Good Hit". The song "Superhoes" from their second album Brothas Doobie was featured on the 1995 soundtrack to F. Gary Gray's film Friday. The song "Act On It" from their third album was used in the Kirk Wong's 1998 film The Big Hit.

From 2003 to 2004, Son Doobie released two solo full-length albums via Battle Axe Records, Funk Superhero and Doobie Deluxe.

== Discography ==
=== Albums ===
List of albums, with selected chart positions
Title	Album details	Peak chart positions	
Title	Album details	US	US R&B
Which Doobie U B?	Released: May 4, 1993; Label: Immortal • Epic	56	19
Brothas Doobie	Released: July 4, 1995; Label: Immortal • Epic	115	35
The Troubleshooters	Released: January 13, 1998; Label: RCA • BMG	—	90
The Golden B-Boys	Released: 2009; Label: Funkdoobiest Music	—	—
"—" denotes a recording that did not chart.

=== Singles ===
List of singles, with selected chart positions and certifications, showing year released and album name
Title	Year	Peak chart positions				Album
Title	Year	US	US Dance	US R&B	UK	Album
"Bow Wow Wow"	1992	89	16	98	34	Which Doobie U B?
"The Funkiest"	1992	—	—	—	—	Which Doobie U B?
"Wopbabalubop" (feat. B-Real)"	1993	—	—	—	37	Which Doobie U B?
"Freak Mode"	1993	—	—	—	—	Which Doobie U B?
"Rock On"	1994	—	—	—	—	Brothas Doobie
"Dedicated"	1995	—	—	—	78	Brothas Doobie
"XXX Funk"	1995	—	—	—	—	Brothas Doobie
"Act On It"	1997	—	—	—	—	The Troubleshooters
"Papi Chulo" (feat. Daz Dillinger)	1997	110	—	—	—	The Troubleshooters
"Hip Hop Music"	2006	—	—	—	—	non-album single
"The Heavyweight Funk"	2009	—	—	—	—	The Golden B-Boys
"—" denotes a recording that did not chart or was not released in that territory.
