= Latin Lingo =

Single by Cypress Hill

from the album Cypress Hill
- B-side: "Stoned Is the Way of the Walk"
- Released: 1992
- Recorded: 1991
- Genre: West Coast hip hop, hardcore hip hop, Latin hip hop
- Length: 4:02
- Label: Ruffhouse
- Songwriters: Louis Freese, Lawrence Muggerud, Senen Reyes
- Producer: DJ Muggs

Cypress Hill singles chronology
"Pigs" (1991)	"Latin Lingo" (1992)	"Insane in the Brain" (1993)

Music video
- "Latin Lingo" on YouTube

"Latin Lingo" is a song by American hip hop group Cypress Hill. The song was released as the final single from the group's self-titled debut album. The song "Hand on the Glock" is a re-recorded version of the song "Hand on the Pump".

== Music video ==
The song's music video primarily shows the group performing the song at a house.

== Track listing ==
No.	Title	Length
1.	"Latin Lingo" (Prince Paul Mix)	3:53
2.	"Latin Lingo" (LP Version)	4:01
3.	"Stoned Is the Way of the Walk" (LP Version)	2:51
4.	"Stoned Is the Way of the Walk" (Reprise)	3:24
5.	"Hand on the Glock"	3:31

== Chart positions ==
Chart	Peak position
US R&B^{[A]}	105
US Rap	12

== Notes ==
- A "Latin Lingo" did not enter the Hot R&B/Hip-Hop Songs chart, but peaked at number 5 on the Bubbling Under R&B/Hip-Hop Singles chart, which acts as a 25-song extension to the R&B/Hip-Hop Songs chart.
