= The 7A3 =

American hip hop group

- Origin: Los Angeles, California, United States
- Genres: Hip hop
- Years active: 1987–1992
- Labels: Macola Records; Geffen/Warner Bros. Records
- Past members: Brett Bouldin; Sean Bouldin; DJ Muggs

The 7A3 was an American hip hop group based in Los Angeles, California, that released one album in 1988 called Coolin' in Cali. The group was originally composed of brothers Brett and Sean Bouldin and DJ Muggs, who later achieved greater fame with Cypress Hill. All originally hailed from New York—Brooklyn and Queens, respectively.

Brett Bouldin founded the group and later wrote Cypress Hill's "Hand on the Pump". He also taught B-Real, Son Doobie, Sean B, Malverde, and others how to write songs. He has written for and performed with others including Shanice, Portrait, Sugar Ray, and Funkdoobiest.

Sean Bouldin went on to become a music executive working with several labels including Interscope, A&M, EMI, Immortal, DreamWorks, and consulted for several others.

The group's sole album and two of its singles performed moderately well on the US charts. The group's song "Mad, Mad World" was released on the Colors soundtrack. In addition, the group's version of "Take You Back" was featured on the Rocky V soundtrack album.

== Discography ==
=== Albums ===
- Coolin' in Cali (1988) (Geffen/Warner Bros. Records 24209) #47 R&B/Hip-Hop

=== Singles ===
- “The 7A3 Will Rock You” (1987)
- “Mad, Mad World” (1988)
- "Party Time / Why?" (1988)
- "Coolin' in Cali" (1988) #64 R&B/Hip-Hop
- “Drums of Steel” (1989) #87 R&B/Hip-Hop
- "Goes Like Dis" (1989)
