= How I Could Just Kill a Man =

1991 single by Cypress Hill

Single by Cypress Hill

from the album Cypress Hill
- B-side: "The Phuncky Feel One"
- Released: June 29, 1991
- Recorded: 1990
- Studio: Image Recording (Los Angeles)
- Genre: Hardcore hip hop; West Coast hip hop; Latin hip hop; gangsta rap
- Length: 4:08
- Label: Ruffhouse; Columbia
- Songwriters: Louis Freese; Lowell Fulson; Jimmy McCracklin; Lawrence Muggerud; Senen Reyes
- Producer: DJ Muggs

Cypress Hill singles chronology
"How I Could Just Kill a Man" (1991)	"Hand on the Pump" (1991)

Music video
- "How I Could Just Kill a Man" on YouTube

"How I Could Just Kill a Man" is the debut single by hip hop group Cypress Hill from their eponymous debut album, Cypress Hill, and was their first major hit in 1991. It was released as a double A-side to "The Phuncky Feel One". The song was also in the movie Juice (1992). It was re-released in 1999 with Spanish lyrics and a new video. It is featured as the first track on their greatest hits compilation Greatest Hits from the Bong. It was voted number 79 in About.com's Top 100 Rap Songs. Along with "The Phuncky Feel One", "How I Could Just Kill a Man" topped the Billboard Year-End Hot Rap Singles of 1992.

Towards the end of the song (approximately the 3:48 point) someone is heard saying, "All I wanted was a Pepsi". This quote is taken from the well-known Suicidal Tendencies song, "Institutionalized".

In 2001, Cypress Hill included a sequel to the song on their album Stoned Raiders entitled "Here Is Something You Can't Understand", using the same chorus but with new verses from B-Real, Sen Dog and guest Kurupt.

== Samples ==
Lowell Fulson's 1967 hit "Tramp" is sampled for the guitar and bass. The drums are taken from "Midnight Theme" by Manzel. A majority of samples have not yet been found, although some have been discovered in recent years.

== Music video ==
The music video features cameos by A Tribe Called Quest's Q-Tip and Tim Dog, as well as Ice Cube.

== Track listing ==
No.	Title	Length
1.	"How I Could Just Kill a Man" (The Killer Mix)	4:08
2.	"How I Could Just Kill a Man" (clean version)	4:08
3.	"How I Could Just Kill a Man" (instrumental)	4:08

- NOTE: "The Killer Mix" is the uncensored album version of the song.

== Charts ==
Chart	Peak position
US	77
US Rap	1

== Covers ==
=== Rage Against the Machine version ===
"How I Could Just Kill a Man"

Single by Rage Against the Machine

from the album Renegades
- Released: October 20, 2001
- Genre: Rap metal; funk metal; rap rock
- Length: 4:04
- Label: Revelation; Epic
- Songwriters: Louis Freese; Lowell Fulson; Jimmy McCracklin; Lawrence Muggerud; Senen Reyes
- Producers: Rick Rubin; Brendan O'Brien; Rage Against the Machine

Rage Against the Machine singles chronology
"Renegades of Funk" (2001)	"How I Could Just Kill a Man" (2001)	"Killing in the Name" (2009)

The song was covered by American rock band Rage Against the Machine on their cover album, Renegades, where the song was released as a single. Rage Against the Machine performed the song on their DVD, Live at the Grand Olympic Auditorium, accompanied by Cypress Hill.

==== Track listing ====
1. "How I Could Just Kill a Man" – 4:04

==== Chart positions ====
Chart	Peak position
US Main.	39
US Alt.	37

==== Certifications ====
Region	Certification	Certified units/sales
United States (RIAA)	Gold	500,000^{‡}
^{‡} Sales+streaming figures based on certification alone.

=== Other versions ===
Singer Charlotte Sometimes named the first single from her debut album Waves and the Both of Us "How I Can Just Kill a Man" in honor of Cypress Hill, though the songs have no other similarities. The song quickly became a staple on both VH1 and MTV during the summer of 2008 and closed her set on the Vans Warped Tour.

It is also covered by B-star on their album What We Do.

A cover version was released in 1994 by German Hamburger Schule band Cpt. Kirk &. on the album Round About Wyatt, but with the song's title changed to "How He Could Just Kill a Man".

The song appears in the 2004 video game Grand Theft Auto: San Andreas in the radio station Radio Los Santos.
