= Hand on the Pump =

Single by Cypress Hill

from the album Cypress Hill
- B-side: "Real Estate"
- Released: 1991
- Recorded: 1991
- Genre: West Coast hip hop; gangsta rap
- Length: 4:02
- Label: Ruffhouse
- Songwriters: Brett Bouldin; Louis Freese; Lawrence Muggerud
- Producer: DJ Muggs

Cypress Hill singles chronology
"The Phuncky Feel One" (1991)	"Hand on the Pump" (1991)	"Pigs" (1991)

Music video
- "Hand on the Pump" on YouTube

"Hand on the Pump" is a single by hip hop group Cypress Hill, released from their self-titled debut album. While still successful, the song did not reach the popularity of previous singles "How I Could Just Kill a Man" and "The Phuncky Feel One". The song was re-recorded and released as a single in 1992 under the name "Hand on the Glock"; this version was also released on the "Latin Lingo" single.

== Music video ==
Like many of the group's early music videos, the video simply shows the members performing the song in various locations, alongside various clips from an unnamed cinematic title filmed in Red Hook, New York

== Track listing ==
Side A
No.	Title	Length
1.	"Hand on the Pump" (LP version)	4:02
2.	"Hand on the Pump" (radio edit)	4:02
3.	"Hand on the Pump" (instrumental)	4:02

Side B
No.	Title	Length
1.	"Real Estate" (LP version)	3:52
2.	"Real Estate" (radio edit)	3:52
3.	"Real Estate" (instrumental)	3:52

== Charts ==
Chart	Peak position
US R&B^{[A]}	49
US Rap	2

== Notes ==
- A "Hand on the Pump" did not enter the Hot R&B/Hip-Hop Songs chart, but peaked at number 6 on the Bubbling Under R&B/Hip-Hop Singles chart, which acts as a 25-song extension to the R&B/Hip-Hop Songs chart.

"Hand on the Pump" samples Gene Chandler's "Duke of Earl" on the 1962 album, Vee Jay, as well as “Shotgun” by Junior Walker & the All Stars.
