= Classified discography =

- Studio albums: 17
- EPs: 3
- Singles: 48
- Music videos: 40
- Compilation albums: 1
- Mixtapes: 1

This is the discography for Canadian hip hop artist Classified.

== Albums ==
=== Studio albums ===
List of albums, with selected chart positions and certifications
Title	Album details	Peak chart positions	Certifications
Title	Album details	CAN	Certifications
Time's Up, Kid	Released: 1995; Label: Shitt Records; Format: CD, cassette	—	
One Shot	Released: 1996; Label: Shitt Records; Format: CD, cassette	—	
What Happened	Released: 1996; Label: Shitt Records; Format: CD, cassette	—	
Information	Released: 1997; Label: Halflife Records; Format: CD, cassette	—	
Now Whut!	Released: 1998; Label: Halflife Records; Format: CD, cassette	—	
Touch of Class	Released: 1999; Label: Halflife Records; Format: CD, cassette	—	
Unpredictable	Released: 2000; Label: Halflife Records; Format: CD, cassette, digital download	—	
Union Dues	Released: 2001; Label: Halflife Records; Format: CD, digital download, cassette	—	
Trial & Error	Released: March 1, 2003; Label: Halflife Records/Urbnet Records; Format: CD, digital download	—	
Boy-Cott-In the Industry	Released: March 8, 2005; Label: Halflife Records/Urbnet Records; Format: CD, digital download	—	
Hitch Hikin' Music	Released: October 31, 2006; Label: Halflife Records/Urbnet Records; Format: CD, digital download	—	
Self Explanatory	Released: April 2, 2009; Label: Halflife Records/Sony Music Canada; Format: CD, digital download	25	MC: Gold
Handshakes and Middle Fingers	Released: March 22, 2011; Label: Halflife Records/Sony Music Canada; Format: CD, digital download	7	MC: Gold
Classified	Released: January 22, 2013; Label: Halflife Records/Universal Music Canada; Format: CD, digital download	1	MC: Platinum
Greatful	Released: January 15, 2016; Label: Halflife Records/Universal Music Canada; Format: CD, digital download, vinyl, streaming	6	
Tomorrow Could Be the Day Things Change	Released: October 12, 2018; Label: Halflife Records/Universal Music Canada; Format: CD, digital download, vinyl, streaming	74	
Luke's View	Released: April 26, 2024; Label: HalfLife Records/Big Story Entertainment; Format: Digital download, streaming	—	
"—" denotes releases that did not chart.

=== Compilation albums ===
Title	Album details
While You Were Sleeping	Released: November 6, 2007; Label: Halflife; Format: CD, digital download

=== Remix albums ===
Title	Album details
Retrospected (Acoustic)	Released: June 29, 2022; Label: Halflife/Universal; Format: CD, digital download, streaming

== EPs ==
List of albums, with selected chart positions and certifications
Title	Album details	Peak chart positions
Title	Album details	CAN
iTunes Session	Released: January 1, 2013; Label: HalfLife Records/Universal Music; Formats: Digital download	—
Tomorrow Could Be...	Released: June 29, 2018; Label: HalfLife Records/Universal Music; Format: CD, digital download, streaming	81
Time	Released: September 25, 2020; Label: HalfLife Records/Universal Music; Formats: CD, digital download, streaming	—
"—" denotes releases that did not chart.

== Mixtapes ==
- The Joint Effort – 2012

== Singles ==
Song	Year	Chart peak				Certifications	Album
Song	Year	CAN	CAN CHR/Top 40	IRE	NZ	Certifications	Album
"Unpredictable"	2000	—	—	—	—		Unpredictable
"Yuh Died Now" (featuring Dan-e-o & D-Sisive)	2001	—	—	—	—		Union Dues
"Gossip/This Is For"	2003	—	—	—	—		Trial & Error
"Heavy Artillery" (featuring Rocky Ninja)	2003	—	—	—	—		Trial & Error
"Unexpected"	2004	—	—	—	—		Trial & Error
"Just the Way It Is" (featuring Eternia, DL Incognito & Maestro Fresh Wes)	2004	—	—	—	—		Trial & Error
"5th Element"	2005	—	—	—	—		Boy-Cott-In the Industry
"Unexplainable Hunger" (featuring Royce da 5'9" & Choclair)	2005	—	—	—	—		Boy-Cott-In the Industry
"The Maritimes"	2005	—	—	—	—		Boy-Cott-In the Industry
"No Mistakes"	2006	—	—	—	—		Boy-Cott-In the Industry
"Find Out"	2006	—	—	—	—		Hitch Hikin' Music
"Feelin Fine (Remix)" (featuring Jordan Croucher & Jay-Bizzy)	2006	—	—	—	—		Hitch Hikin' Music
"All About U" (featuring Chad Hatcher)	2007	—	—	—	—		Hitch Hikin' Music
"Hard to Be Hip Hop" (featuring Maestro Fresh Wes & DJ IV)	2007	—	—	—	—		Hitch Hikin' Music
"Fall from Paradise"	2007	—	—	—	—		Hitch Hikin' Music
"Trouble"	2008	—	—	—	—		Self Explanatory
"Anybody Listening"	2009	52	8	—	—		Self Explanatory
"Oh...Canada"	2009	14	—	—	—	MC: Platinum	Self Explanatory
"Up All Night"	2009	—	42	—	—		Self Explanatory
"Quit While You're Ahead" (featuring Choclair, Maestro Fresh Wes & Moka Only)	2009	—	—	—	—		Self Explanatory
"They Call This (Hip Hop)" (featuring Royce da 5'9" & B.o.B)	2010	—	—	—	—		Self Explanatory
"That Ain't Classy" (featuring Ashley Coulter)	2011	45	32	—	—	MC: Platinum	Handshakes and Middle Fingers
"The Day Doesn't Die"	2011	83	33	—	—		Handshakes and Middle Fingers
"Maybe It's Just Me" (featuring Brother Ali)	2011	—	—	—	—		Handshakes and Middle Fingers
"Unusual" (featuring Joe Budden)	2011	—	—	—	—		Handshakes and Middle Fingers
"The Hangover" (featuring Kayo & Jim Cuddy)	2012	—	—	—	—		Handshakes and Middle Fingers
"Anything Goes" (featuring Saukrates & Skratch Bastid)	2012	71	—	—	—		Classified
"Inner Ninja" (featuring David Myles)	2012	5	6	37	—	MC: 5× Platinum	Classified
"3 Foot Tall"	2013	34	21	—	—	MC: Platinum	Classified
"Pay Day"	2013	41	11	—	—		Classified
"Inner Ninja" (remix) (featuring Olly Murs)	2013	—	—	—	33		Non-album single
"Higher" (featuring B.o.B)	2014	31	11	—	—	MC: Gold	Classified
"Filthy" (featuring DJ Premier)	2015	—	—	—	—		Greatful
"No Pressure" (featuring Snoop Dogg)	2015	65	18	—	—	MC: Gold	Greatful
"Noah's Arc" (featuring Saukrates)	2016	—	—	—	—		Greatful
"Having Kids Is Easy"	2016	—	—	—	—		Greatful
"Work Away" (featuring David Myles)	2016	— (Note: "Work Away" did not enter the Canadian Hot 100, but peaked at number 24 on the Canadian Digital Song Sales chart.)	—	—	—		Greatful
"Powerless"	2018	—	—	—	—		Tomorrow Could Be...
"Changes" (featuring Anjulie)	2018	—	—	—	—		Tomorrow Could Be...
"She Ain't Gotta Do Much"	2018	—	34	—	—		Tomorrow Could Be...
"Cold Love" (featuring Tory Lanez)	2018	—	—	—	—		Tomorrow Could Be the Day Things Change
"10 Years"	2018	—	25	—	—		Tomorrow Could Be the Day Things Change
"Hurt Everybody" (with Choclair)	2019	—	—	—	—		Non-album single
"Rap Sh*t" (featuring Dax and Snak the Ripper)	2020	—	—	—	—		Time
"Good News" (featuring Breagh Isabel)	2020	— (Note: "Good News" did not enter the Canadian Hot 100, but peaked at number 47 on the Canadian Digital Song Sales chart.)	—	—	—	MC: Gold	Time
"Pick Your Poison"	2020	—	—	—	—		Time
"Get Ready" (featuring Merkules)	2020	—	—	—	—		Time
"The Bells Are Ringing" (featuring Breagh Isabel)	2020	—	—	—	—		Non-album single
"People"	2023	—	—	—	—		Luke's View
"Wonder" (featuring Ian Janes)	2023	—	—	—	—		Luke's View
"The Hardy Boyds" (featuring Mike Boyd)	2023	—	—	—	—		Luke's View
"All Wrong"	2024	—	—	—	—		Luke's View
"Sure Enough" (featuring Masta Ace)	2024	—	—	—	—		Luke's View
"—" denotes a release that did not chart.

== Music videos ==
Year	Title	Director	Album
2008	"Trouble"	—	Self Explanatory
2009	"Anybody Listening"	—	Self Explanatory
2009	"Oh... Canada"	—	Self Explanatory
2009	"UP All Night"	—	Self Explanatory
2009	"Quit While You're Ahead" (featuring Choclair, Maestro Fresh Wes, and Moka Only)	—	Self Explanatory
2011	"That Ain't Classy" featuring Ashley Coulter)	—	Handshakes and Middle Fingers
2011	"The Day Doesn't Die" (featuring David Myles)	—	Handshakes and Middle Fingers
2011	"Maybe It's Just Me" (featuring Brother Ali)	—	Handshakes and Middle Fingers
2011	"Unusual" (featuring Joe Budden)	—	Handshakes and Middle Fingers
2012	"The Hangover" (featuring Kayo and Jim Cuddy)	—	Handshakes and Middle Fingers
2012	"Anything Goes" (featuring Saukrates and Skratch Bastid)	—	Classified
2012	"Inner Ninja" (featuring David Myles)	—	Classified
2013	"3 Foot Tall"	—	Classified
2013	"Pay Day"	—	Classified
2013	"That's What I Do"	—	Classified
2013	"Inner Ninja" (Remix) (featuring Olly Murs)	—	—
2014	"Higher" (featuring B.o.B)	—	Classified
2015	"Filthy" (featuring DJ Premier)	Harv Glazer	Greatful
2015	"No Pressure" (featuring Snoop Dogg)	Dave Hung and Tyler Ross	Greatful
2016	"Noah's Arc" (featuring Saukrates)	Mat Barkley	Greatful
2016	"Having Kids Is Easy"	Justin Lee	Greatful
2016	"Work Away" (featuring David Myles)	Jason Levangie	Greatful
2018	"Changes" (featuring Anjulie)	—	Tomorrow Could Be...
2018	"Powerless"	Andy Hines	Tomorrow Could Be...
2018	"She Ain't Gotta Do Much"	—	Tomorrow Could Be...
2018	"Finish It"	—	Tomorrow Could Be the Day Things Change
2018	"Legalize Marijuana"	Harv Glazer	Tomorrow Could Be the Day Things Change
2019	"Cold Love" (featuring Tory Lanez)	Mike Boyd	Tomorrow Could Be the Day Things Change
2019	"Super Nova Scotian"	Mike Boyd	Tomorrow Could Be the Day Things Change
2019	"10 Years"	Harv Glazer	Tomorrow Could Be the Day Things Change
2019	"Hurt Everybody" (featuring Choclair)	Brothers Boyd	—
2020	"Rap Sh*t" (featuring Dax and Snak the Ripper)	Mike Boyd	Time
2020	"Good News" (featuring Breagh Isabel)	Brothers Boyd	Time
2020	"Pick Your Poison"	Brothers Boyd	Time
2020	"The Bells are Ringing" (featuring Breagh Isabel)	Brothers Boyd	—
2022	"The Day Doesn't Die (Retrospected)"	Brothers Boyd	Retrospected (Acoustic)
2022	"3 Foot Tall (Retrospected)" (featuring O'Sound and Brett Matthews)	Brothers Boyd	Retrospected (Acoustic)
2022	"Inner Ninja (Retrospected)" (with Matt Mays, David Myles, JRDN, and Joel Plaskett)	Brothers Boyd	Retrospected (Acoustic)
2022	"Fall From Paradise (Retrospected)"	Brothers Boyd	Retrospected (Acoustic)
2023	"People"	—	Luke's View
2023	"Wonder" (featuring Ian Janes)	—	Luke's View
