= Shubenacadie =

Shubenacadie may refer to:

- Shubenacadie, Nova Scotia, an unincorporated community in Hants County, Nova Scotia
- Shubenacadie River
- Shubenacadie Tree, a 300 year old oak tree near Shubenacadie, Nova Scotia
- Shubenacadie Valley
- Shubenacadie Grand Lake
