= Enfield, Nova Scotia =

Community in Nova Scotia, Canada

Enfield
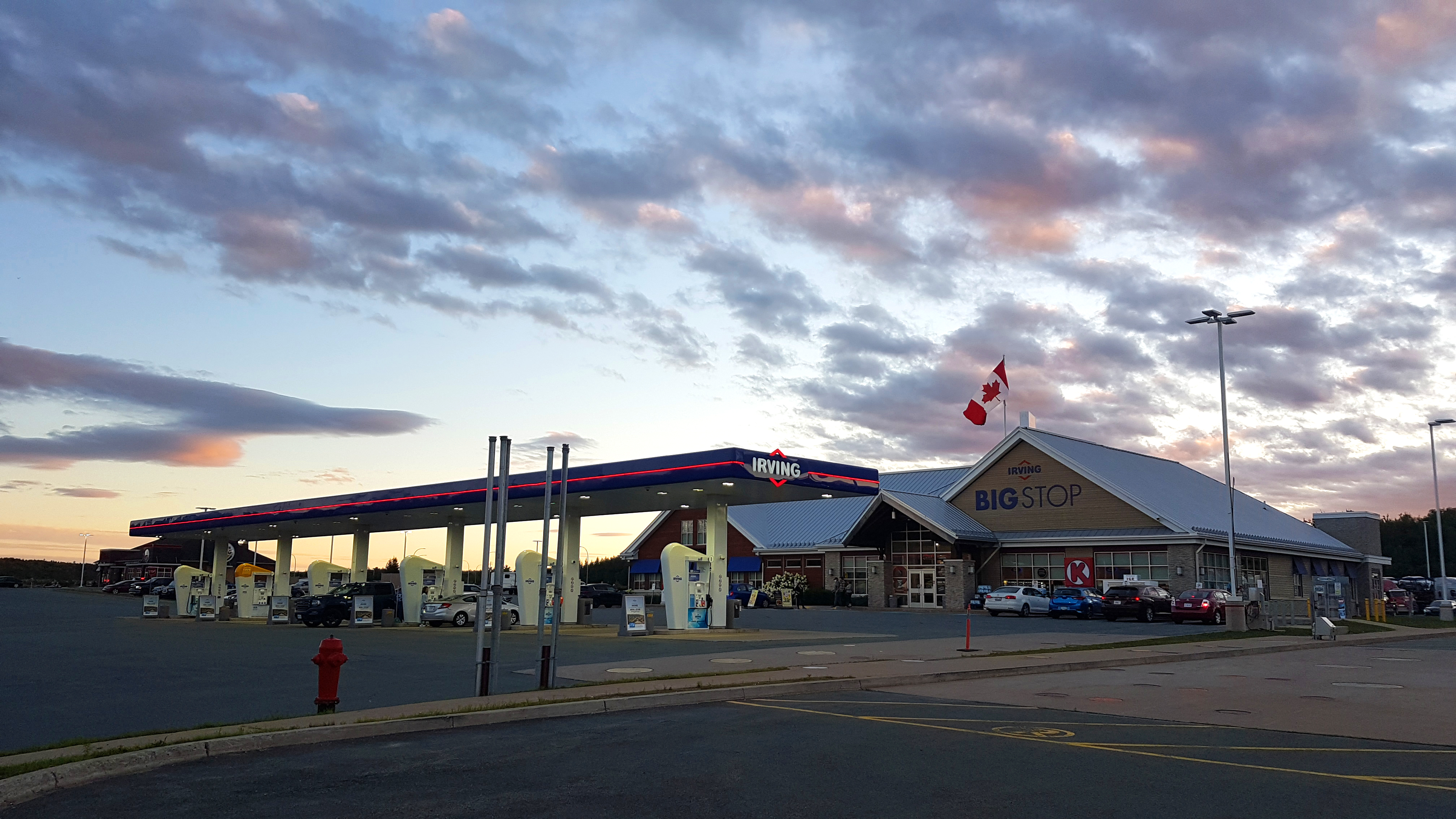
- Irving Big Stop in Enfield
- Interactive map of Enfield
- Coordinates: 44°56′36″N 63°32′10″W
- Country: Canada
- Province: Nova Scotia
- Municipality: Halifax Regional Municipality; East Hants Municipality
- District: 10
- Founded: 1862
- Named for: Enfield, Connecticut

Government
  - Type: Regional Council
  - Governing body: Municipal Council of East Hants

Area
  - Land: 11.67 km^{2} (4.51 sq mi)
- Highest elevation: 124 m (407 ft)
- Lowest elevation: 8 m (26 ft)

Population (2021)
  - Total: 6,583
  - Density: 563.9/km^{2} (1,460/sq mi)
- Time zone: UTC-4 (AST)
  - Summer (DST): UTC-3 (ADT)
- Postal code: B2T
- Area code: 902
- GNBC Code: CALHK

Enfield is an unincorporated community in the Canadian province of Nova Scotia, located in both East Hants Municipality and Halifax Regional Municipality. Enfield is situated along the Shubenacadie River and its source at Grand Lake, and is directly adjacent to the community of Elmsdale. The area encompassing Enfield, Elmsdale, Lantz, and Milford is colloquially referred to as "The Corridor". The namesake of Enfield is the town of Enfield, Connecticut, the former residence of an early settler.

== History ==
=== 18th and 19th centuries ===
The lands including the present day community of Enfield were part of a land grant of 20,000 acres provided to Benjamin Franklin by the Privy Council of Nova Scotia in 1767. Franklin had applied for the land grant in 1765 and by the time he received it had largely lost interest in developing the lands. While he never moved to Nova Scotia himself, he hired a man named Mr. Hall to settle the lands and operate a hotel there named the "Wayside Inn." Franklin would bequeath these lands to his son, William Franklin, who fought against his father in the American Revolutionary War. Benjamin Franklin was quite wealthy at the time of his death, and leaving solely these undeveloped, worthless lands to his son was considered to be a final act of retribution.

"To my son, William Franklin, late Governor of the Jerseys, I give and devise all the lands I hold or have a right to in the Province of Nova Scotia … The part he acted against me in the late war, which is of public notoriety, will account for my leaving him no more of an estate he endeavoured to deprive me of." – The Last Will and Testament of Benjamin Franklin

While the lands were left to William Franklin upon his father's death, ownership of the land would have been unclear as the terms of the agreement stipulated that the land must be settled within ten years of ownership. William would never again return to North America, and the exact nature of the settlement in the area at the time is unclear.

The first recorded settler in the area is William Hall, who established himself in the area in 1830. By the 1860s, there were five families in the area, which at the time was referred to as "The Crossing." The families included that of Henry Donaldson (farmer), Thomas Donaldson (trader), John Hall (trader), Donald McKenzie (farmer), and James McKenzie (deputy gold commissioner). In 1862 the settlers held a public meeting at Malcolm Pottery House to decide on a name for the growing community. The name "Enfield" was suggested by Thomas B. Donaldson, recalling his time living in Enfield, Connecticut. After selling his general store business in 1867, Thomas Donaldson purchased the Hall farm in Enfield. By 1871 he had firmly established himself in the community and began planning for the construction of a church. The building was completed by 1872, operating originally as a Methodist church and later a United Church.

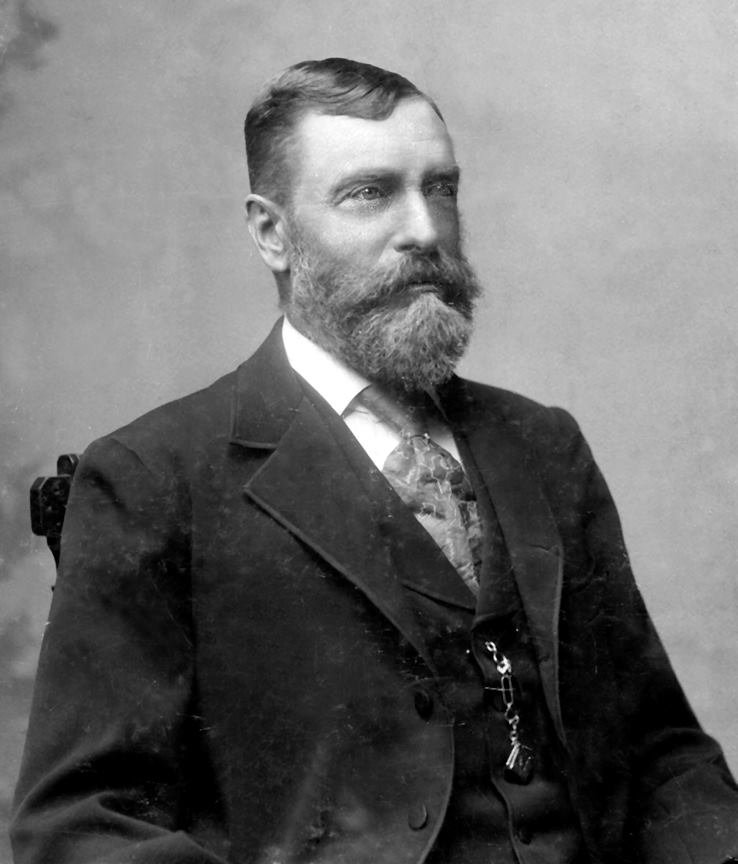
Thomas B. Donaldson

Enfield experienced a period of growth during the mid-19th century as a shipping hub for the nearby gold mining area of Renfrew. During this time a system of locks on the Shubenacadie River was constructed to assist small vessels in navigating from the Bay of Fundy to nearby Grand Lake as part of the Shubenacadie Canal.

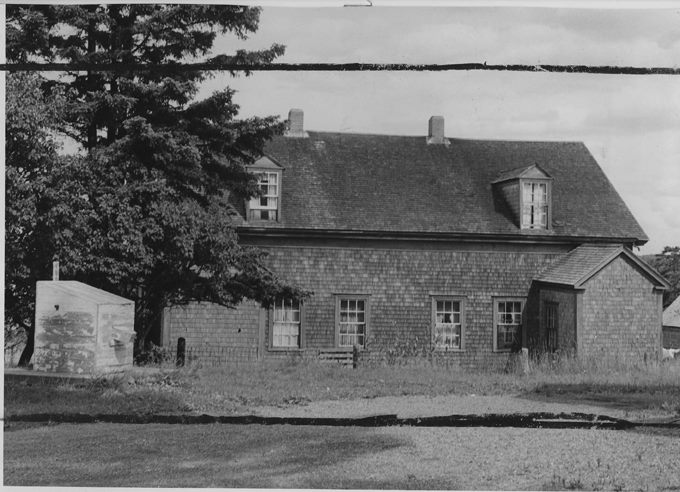
Malcolm Pottery House

The Horne family, well known in Enfield today, are descended from German immigrant Jacob Horn. Horn immigrated to America and was piloting a boat from New York when General James Wolfe stopped in Halifax on the way to Louisbourg in 1759. After the capture of Louisbourg, Horn was given a land grant on McNab's Island, where he built a home. The location on the island was inconvenient for trading and transporting cattle, and Horn would later give up this grant and move to Eastern Passage. His grant there was a 220 acre plot originally granted to Joseph Goreham on 20 July 1752, escheated on 24 August 1797, and granted to Jacob Horn on 1 November 1798.

=== 20th century ===
Enfield continued to grow steadily into the 20th century. During this time, Enfield became known as the home of Edmund H. Horne; prospector, miner, and descendent of Jacob Horn. Horne had spent a number of years traveling the United States and Canada before discovering the site of the Noranda Mines in Quebec. After finding success in Quebec he eventually returned to his hometown of Enfield and established his estate, Monte Vista Farm, on Grand Lake. At his estate Horne raised prize winning cattle and established himself as an integral part of the community.

Around 1940, Reverend J.J. Devine, the parish priest of St. Bernard's Church, approached Horne to express the need for a new school in the community. Horne would organize and fund the construction of a four classroom school, with a library and auditorium. The E. H. Horne School opened in 1943 teaching grades primary to eleven, and the auditorium would become a major asset for the community for concerts, meetings, and other events. When the church in Enfield was destroyed by fire in March 1944, services were held in the school while residents waited for a new church venue. When Hants East Rural High School opened in nearby Milford in 1957, the E. H. Horne School would be reduced to teaching grades primary to six. The E. H. Horne school continued to be used as a school until 2000.

=== 21st century ===
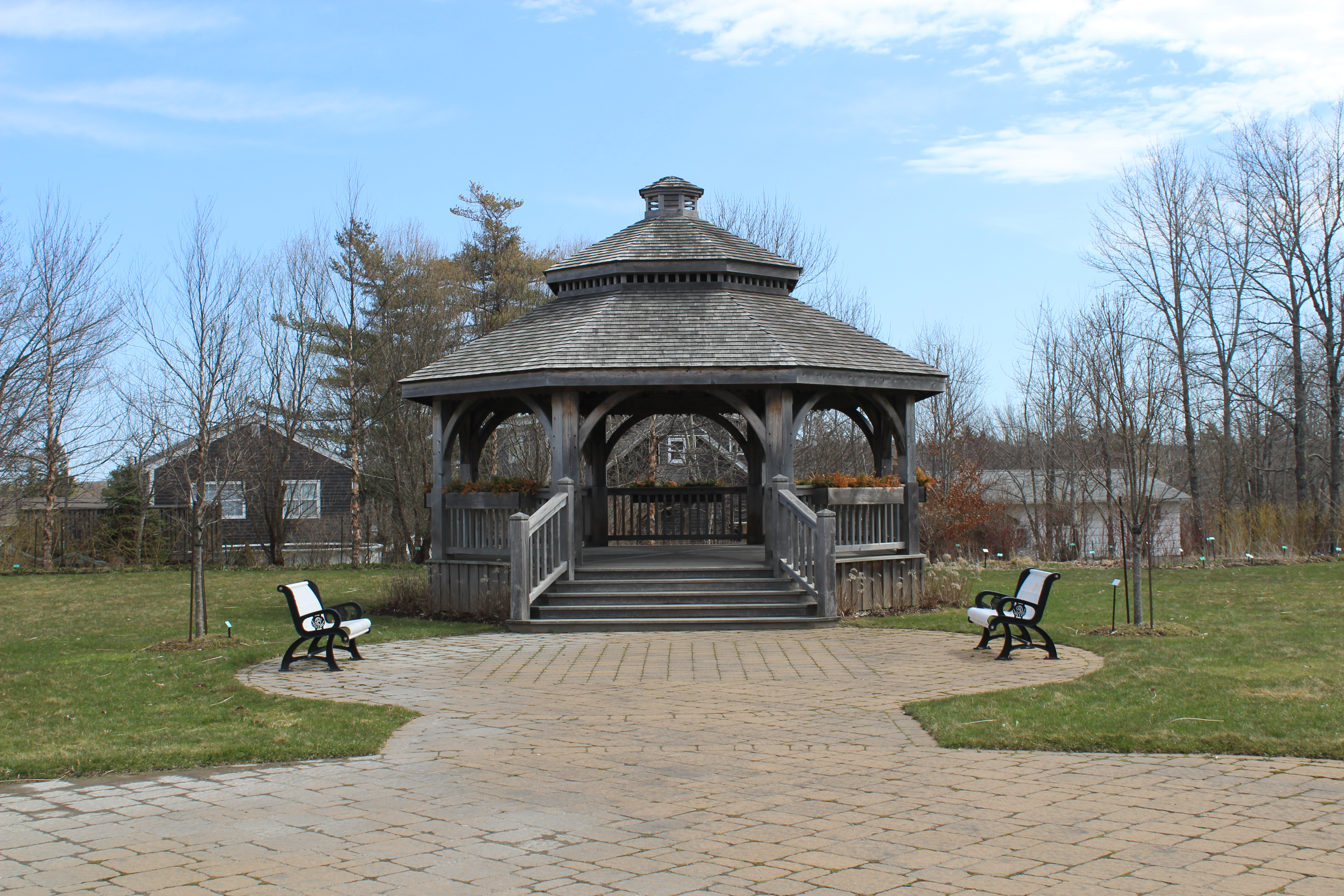
Gazebo at St. Bernard's Park in Enfield

Situated near the halfway point between Halifax and Truro, Enfield was once home to a prominent railway station constructed by the Nova Scotia Railway and later the Intercolonial Railway and Canadian National Railway; it has since been sold, moved and now is a private cottage near Monte Vista.

In 2016, Enfield residents Lorraine and Hervé Burri funded the creation of a new park in Enfield beside St. Bernard's Church. Upon its opening in 2017, St. Bernard's Park featured 100 different species of flowers, 25 different species of trees and 20 different species of grasses. A Japanese garden and 400 square-foot red spruce gazebo was also constructed in the park.

On April 19, 2020, a spree killing that spanned a wide area of Nova Scotia resulted in a police chase that ended on Highway 2 in Enfield.

== Geography ==
Enfield lies in the Shubenacadie Valley, on the northwestern and eastern side of Grand Lake, situated along the meanders of the Shubenacadie River. The community is situated 5 kilometres (3.1 mi) north of Halifax Stanfield International Airport on the border of Hants County and Halifax County. Enfield exists in both the East Hants Municipality and Halifax Regional Municipality.

=== Climate ===
Enfield has a humid continental climate with some marine influence, as typical of Nova Scotia. The nearest station is at the Halifax Stanfield International Airport located around 5 kilometres (3.1 mi) south of the Enfield core.

Climate data for Halifax Stanfield International Airport (1981−2010)
Month	Jan	Feb	Mar	Apr	May	Jun	Jul	Aug	Sep	Oct	Nov	Dec	Year
Record high humidex	18.4	18.3	27.7	32.1	36.0	40.2	42.4	41.9	42.1	31.9	25.4	20.4	42.4
Record high °C (°F)	14.8 (58.6)	17.5 (63.5)	25.6 (78.1)	29.5 (85.1)	32.8 (91.0)	33.4 (92.1)	33.9 (93.0)	35.0 (95.0)	34.2 (93.6)	25.8 (78.4)	19.4 (66.9)	16.3 (61.3)	35.0 (95.0)
Mean daily maximum °C (°F)	−1.3 (29.7)	−0.6 (30.9)	3.1 (37.6)	9.1 (48.4)	15.3 (59.5)	20.4 (68.7)	23.8 (74.8)	23.6 (74.5)	19.4 (66.9)	13.1 (55.6)	7.3 (45.1)	1.7 (35.1)	11.3 (52.3)
Daily mean °C (°F)	−5.9 (21.4)	−5.2 (22.6)	−1.3 (29.7)	4.4 (39.9)	10.0 (50.0)	15.1 (59.2)	18.8 (65.8)	18.7 (65.7)	14.6 (58.3)	8.7 (47.7)	3.5 (38.3)	−2.4 (27.7)	6.6 (43.9)
Mean daily minimum °C (°F)	−10.4 (13.3)	−9.7 (14.5)	−5.7 (21.7)	−0.3 (31.5)	4.6 (40.3)	9.7 (49.5)	13.7 (56.7)	13.7 (56.7)	9.7 (49.5)	4.2 (39.6)	−0.4 (31.3)	−6.4 (20.5)	1.9 (35.4)
Record low °C (°F)	−28.5 (−19.3)	−27.3 (−17.1)	−22.4 (−8.3)	−12.8 (9.0)	−4.4 (24.1)	0.6 (33.1)	6.1 (43.0)	4.4 (39.9)	−0.8 (30.6)	−6.7 (19.9)	−13.1 (8.4)	−23.3 (−9.9)	−28.5 (−19.3)
Record low wind chill	−40.4	−41.1	−33.9	−24.4	−10.9	0.0	0.0	0.0	−3.0	−10.1	−23.9	−35.6	−41.1
Average precipitation mm (inches)	134.3 (5.29)	105.8 (4.17)	120.1 (4.73)	114.5 (4.51)	111.9 (4.41)	96.2 (3.79)	95.5 (3.76)	93.5 (3.68)	102.0 (4.02)	124.9 (4.92)	154.2 (6.07)	143.3 (5.64)	1,396.2 (54.97)
Average rainfall mm (inches)	83.5 (3.29)	65.0 (2.56)	86.9 (3.42)	98.2 (3.87)	109.8 (4.32)	96.2 (3.79)	95.5 (3.76)	93.5 (3.68)	102.0 (4.02)	124.6 (4.91)	139.1 (5.48)	101.8 (4.01)	1,196.1 (47.09)
Average snowfall cm (inches)	58 (23)	45 (18)	37 (15)	16 (6.3)	2 (0.8)	0 (0)	0 (0)	0 (0)	0 (0)	0 (0)	17 (6.7)	45 (18)	221 (87)
Average precipitation days (≥ 0.2 mm)	18.7	15.2	15.1	14.8	13.7	12.9	11.3	11.0	10.2	12.1	15.1	17.4	167.4
Average rainy days (≥ 0.2 mm)	8.0	6.1	8.6	12.1	13.5	12.9	11.3	11.0	10.2	12.1	12.8	9.8	128.4
Average snowy days (≥ 0.2 cm)	14.6	12.0	9.6	5.2	0.61	0.0	0.0	0.0	0.0	0.14	3.9	11.7	57.7
Average relative humidity (%)	83.8	82.8	83.8	85.5	87.0	88.2	89.5	90.9	91.6	89.9	87.0	85.6	87.1
Source: Environment Canada

== Demographics ==
In the 2021 Census of Population conducted by Statistics Canada, the area of Enfield—Lantz had a population of 6,583 living in 2,724 of its 2,806 total private dwellings, a change of −3.4% from its 2016 population of 6,807. With a land area of 11.67 km^{2} (4.51 sq mi), it had a population density of 564.1/km^{2} (1,461.0/sq mi) in 2021.

== Economy ==
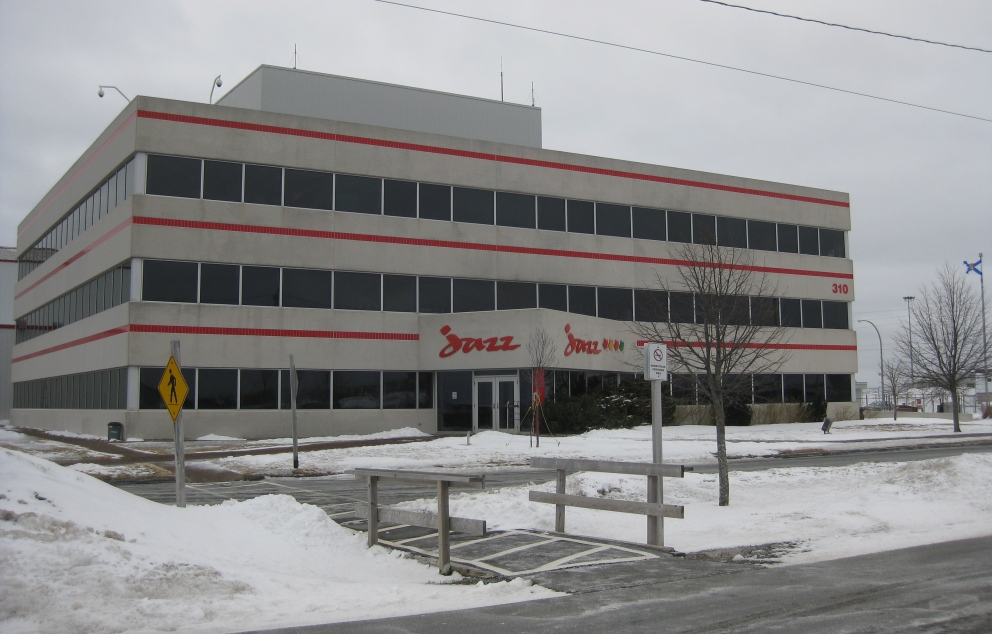
Headquarters of Air Canada Jazz

Enfield is a bedroom community with a small but diverse local economy. Employment in the area is concentrated in health care and social assistance (12%), retail trade (12%), public administration (12%), and construction (9%). The East Hants Chamber of Commerce is based in Enfield and services the surrounding business community.

A major economic driver for the area is the nearby Halifax Stanfield International Airport. Air Canada Jazz and Maritime Air Charter have their headquarters adjacent to the airport. Now-defunct CanJet and Air Nova were also based in the vicinity of the airport.

== Sports ==
The Enfield Rugby Football Club (Established 2007) won the NSRFU Summer Division II Championship against the Halifax Tars 26-12 after completing an undefeated 8-0 season. They were also the Truro 7's Indoor Rugby Men's Div 'A' Champions for 2009.
