= Edmund Henry Horne =

Canadian businessman

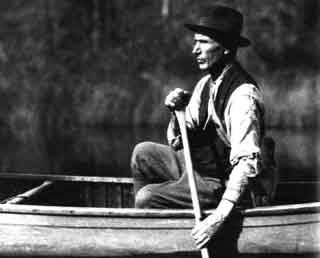
Edmund Horne

Edmund Henry (E.H) Horne (February 13, 1865 – March 15, 1953) was a Canadian businessman and prospector. He was most famous for being the founder of Noranda, a mining and metallurgy company originally from Rouyn-Noranda, Quebec, Canada.

== Life ==
Edmund Horne was born in Enfield, Nova Scotia, to Catherine (MacDonald) and Leonard Horne. He was a great-grandson of Jacob Horn who is rumoured to have fought at the battle at the Plains of Abraham. (Jacob Horn was granted land in Eastern Passage, Nova Scotia. Jacob's son, Andrew Philip Horne, brought his family to settle at the eastern side of Shubenacadie Grand Lake which would become known as Horne Settlement and later Enfield.)

Horne worked for several years learning the trade in the gold mines of Renfrew, Nova Scotia, and Oldham near his home in Nova Scotia. He then went to Colorado, and then to the gold camps of British Columbia and California. In 1908, Horne caught wind of the silver discoveries in Cobalt, Ontario and travelled back to the area.

He was first attracted by the general rock structure of the Rouyn area in 1911. Results of three subsequent trips to the Quebec township proved disappointing, but had the tenacity and prospector's instinct that refused to be downed. As a consequence in 1920 he succeeded in forming a syndicate to finance the staking and development of the present 600-acre (2.4 km^{2}) area. The series of operations culminating in the incorporation under the Laws of Ontario of Noranda were started in August, 1922, when claims staked by Edmund Horne in Rouyn Township, Quebec, were optioned by a syndicate formed a few months previous for the purpose of exploring promising areas, the acquirement of claims and the general development of mining properties. The Horne claims, together with a number of other properties that had been acquired developed Noranda into an outstanding copper-gold producer. Noranda went on to employ more than 32,000 people, and have assets in excess of $11.8 billion.

Edmund Henry Horne died on March 15, 1953, in Halifax, Nova Scotia.

== Legacy ==
E.H. Horne School

E. H. (Edmund Henry) Horne married later in life and returned to his hometown of Enfield, Nova Scotia.

Edmund and his wife Anna lived at Monte Vista, their 1,000-acre (4.0 km^{2}) farm on Grand Lake, on the outskirts of Enfield. There they raised prize cattle. During the Second World War, the childless couple took in British children who were sent to Canada for safety reasons.

The Hornes were very generous to the community of Enfield. They supported St. Bernard's Parish during their lifetime and after their death.

When Rev. J.J. Devine, pastor of St. Bernard's, saw the need for a new school in the community, he approached Edmund Horne for help. As a result of Fr. Devine's visit, the Hornes built a state of the art school for the community. Mr. Horne had the school built, named it the E.H. Horne School and presented the deed to the community at the opening ceremonies early in 1943. The school was to be run by a board of trustees, and the Sisters of Charity were to be the main teachers, with at least one lay teacher. The event was covered by the media and published in the provincial newspaper.

The E.H. Horne School is still a vital part of the community of Enfield. Although it has no longer used as a school since 2000, it is now a community centre which houses various businesses such as dance and exercise classes as well as a daycare.

A few years after Edmund's death, Anna gifted their estate of Monte Vista to the Oblates of Eastern Canada. It has changed hands several times and since has been subdivided. The main house remains although it had a major extension when owned by Charles and Patricia McCulloch.

The Hornes are buried in St. Bernard's Cemetery, directly across the road from the E.H. Horne School.

E.H. Horne was inducted into the Canadian Mining Hall of Fame in 1996.
