= Shubenacadie Valley =

Valley in Nova Scotia, Canada

Coordinates: 45°5′11″N 63°24′29″W

The Shubenacadie Valley is a Canadian rural region in central Nova Scotia.

The picturesque Shubenacadie River flows through the valley, which is framed by low hills from its source at Shubenacadie Grand Lake in north-central Halifax County, then through a rolling landscape of rich soils left by glacial deposits through the border area of eastern Hants County and southwestern Colchester County.

The valley is a historic transportation corridor in the province, having once been a portage route for the Mi'kmaq Nation and European settlers. The Shubenacadie River was incorporated into the ill-fated Shubenacadie Canal system which linked the Atlantic coast to the Bay of Fundy until it was made redundant shortly after completion by the Nova Scotia Railway which was built through the valley; this railway was merged into the Intercolonial Railway and today is owned and operated by CN Rail. During the 1970s, the Highway 102 expressway was constructed between Halifax and Truro to relieve traffic pressure on the historic Trunk 2.

Resulting from its location astride the Halifax-Truro transportation corridor, the communities in the Shubenacadie Valley are experiencing a high rate of residential growth as they become a suburban/exurban area of Halifax.

The valley includes the following communities from the river's source to its outlet:

- Enfield
- Elmsdale
- Lantz
- Dutch Settlement
- Milford
- Indian Brook Reserve
- Shubenacadie
- Maitland
