= East Hants Aquatic Centre =

Swimming facility in Nova Scotia

- Interactive map of the East Hants Aquatic Centre area

General information
- Type: Swimming pool; recreation centre
- Location: 14 Commerce Court, Elmsdale, Nova Scotia, Canada
- Coordinates: 44.977208°N 63.510254°W
- Year built: 2018–2020
- Opened: 22 July 2020
- Cost: CA$19 million
- Owner: Municipality of the District of East Hants

Design and construction
- Architecture firm: TEAL Architects; MJMA Architecture & Design

Website
- www.easthants.ca/east-hants-aquatic-centre/

The East Hants Aquatic Centre is a large swimming pool and recreation centre in the Canadian province of Nova Scotia, located in the community of Elmsdale. Built to replace the old municipal pool in Milford, the aquatic centre opened to the public in July 2020. The centre suffered extensive damage during the 2023 Nova Scotia floods, and remained closed for repairs for an extended period.

== Description ==
The East Hants Aquatic Centre is a large, modern facility in Elmsdale, located in the business park on Commerce Court. The 28,800 square foot building was designed by TEAL Architects in partnership with MJMA Architecture & Design, and was built for a total cost of CA$19 million. Two-thirds of this cost was covered by the Municipality of East Hants, while the federal government covered the remaining $5.8 million.

The centre features six 25-metre swimming lanes, a waterslide, diving boards, a 20-person hot tub, a climbing wall, a lazy river, splash pads, and an outdoor splash park. In addition to swimming facilities, the aquatic centre also has a multipurpose room with a kitchen for accommodating recreation programs.

== History ==
The aquatic centre was built to replace the old municipal pool in Milford. In 2015, the municipality announced a proposal to build the aquatic centre adjacent to the Elmsdale Atlantic Superstore in a partnership with Choice Properties REIT; they instead chose to build it in the Elmsdale Business Park, adjacent to the Lloyd E. Matheson Building.

Construction of the East Hants Aquatic Centre began in May 2018, and was expected to be completed by fall of 2019. The centre officially opened on 22 July 2020, and a grand opening ceremony was held on 18 September 2020, attended by Warden Jim Smith and MP Kody Blois.

The East Hants Aquatic Centre suffered extensive damage as a result of the 2023 Nova Scotia floods in July, during which 175–250 millimetres of rain fell in Elmsdale within a 12-hour timeframe. Several feet of stormwater accumulated in the basement of the aquatic centre, and several inches on the upper level. The basement of the centre contains the building's electrical equipment and mechanical systems, some of which was damaged beyond repair by the flood. Total costs for repairs exceeded CA$3 million. The aquatic centre re-opened to the public in July 2024.
