= List of ghost towns in Nova Scotia =

The following is a list of known abandoned communities in Nova Scotia, Canada.

- Beaubassin
- Broughton
- Eatonville
- Goldenville (partial)
- New France
- New Yarmouth
- Renfrew
- Roxbury
- Wine Harbour

== See also ==
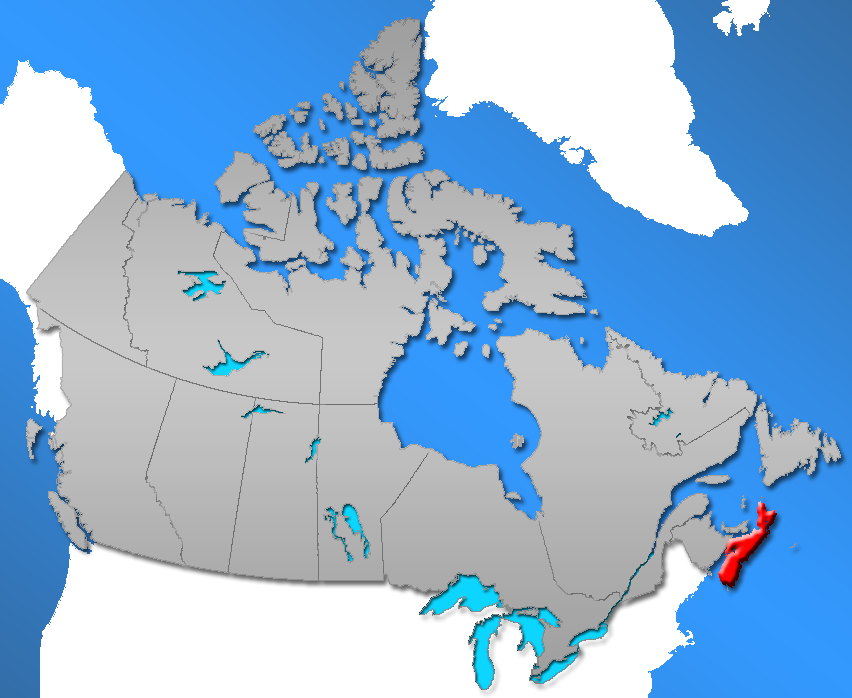
Ghost towns in Canada by province or territory
- Census divisions of Nova Scotia
- List of communities in Nova Scotia
