= Classified (Classified album) =

Studio album by Classified
- Released: January 22, 2013
- Genre: Hip-hop
- Length: 47:24
- Label: Halflife Records/Universal Music Canada
- Producer: Classified

Classified chronology
Handshakes and Middle Fingers (2011)	Classified (2013)	Greatful (2016)

Classified is the third major release studio album by Canadian rapper Classified released on January 22, 2013, on Universal Music Canada. This is his fourteenth studio album overall. The album had debuted at #1 on the Canadian Albums Chart, earning Classified his first number one album in the country. The first official single; "Inner Ninja" reached #5 on the Canadian Hot 100, making it Classified's first top-ten hit on the chart; the song has earned a 2013 Juno Award for "Rap Recording of the Year" and has been certified 4× Platinum in digital downloads by Music Canada, it Classified's second song to receive platinum status, the first being "Oh...Canada". The second official single off the album is "3 Foot Tall" which was also certified Platinum. The third single off the album is "Pay Day". Other promotional singles from the album include "Anything Goes" and "Familiar", both of which had accompanying music videos. As of March 2014, the album was certified Gold by Music Canada and was also re-released on March 11, 2014, adding the hit single "Higher" featuring B.o.B. In September 2017, the album was certified Platinum by Music Canada.

Professional ratings
Review scores
Source	Rating
Exclaim!	7/10

== Track listing ==
No.	Title	Writer(s)	Length
1.	"Intro"	Luke Boyd	1:18
2.	"3 Foot Tall"	Luke Boyd; Mike Boyd; David Christiensen; Bret McKenzie	3:43
3.	"That's What I Do"	Luke Boyd; Mike Boyd; Mike Boyd Sr.; Dutch Robinson	3:49
4.	"Inner Ninja" (featuring David Myles or Olly Murs)	Luke Boyd; David Myles	3:24
5.	"Anything Goes" (featuring Saukrates and Skratch Bastid)	Luke Boyd; Karl Wailoo; Mark Pellizer; David Christiensen; Paul Murphy	4:12
6.	"I Only Say It Cause It's True" (featuring Raekwon and Kuniva)	Luke Boyd; Corey Woods; Von Carlisle; Mark Pellizer; David Christiensen; Mike Boyd; Jake Boyd	4:20
7.	"Growing Pains"	Luke Boyd; Brian Pelrine; David Christiensen; Glenn MacDonnell	3:51
8.	"Familiar" (featuring Mike Boyd and DJ IV)	Luke Boyd; Mike Boyd; Brian Pelrine; Mark Pellizer	3:44
9.	"Hi-Dea's"	Luke Boyd; Mark Pellizer; David Christiensen; Mike Boyd Sr.	3:48
10.	"Pay Day"	Luke Boyd; Jordan Croucher; Mark Pellizer; David Christiensen; Joseph Serra; Brian Pelrine; Lisa Scinta; Alphonzo Mizell; Berry Gordy; Deke Richards; Freddie Perren	3:39
11.	"New School/Old School" (featuring Kayo)	Luke Boyd; Filbert Salton; Brian Pelrine; David Christiensen	3:11
12.	"Wicked"	Luke Boyd; Mark Pellizer	3:42
13.	"Look Up (Signs)" (featuring Kardinal Offishall and Madchild)	Luke Boyd; Jason Harrow; Shane Bunting; Mark Pellizer; David Christiensen; Glenn MacDonnell; Brian Pelrine	4:43

== Personnel ==
#	Title	Notes
1	"Intro"	Producer, Engineer and Arranger: Classified
2	"3 Foot Tall"	Producer, Engineer and Arranger: Classified; Keys: Luke Boyd; String orchestration: David Christiensen; Additional vocals: The Palace Night Club (Aug 16, 2012); Choir: Jenna DiMarco, Shane Harte, Natasha Lizzi, Nicole Monteiro, Samantha Nikolich, Sabrina Saudin, Julia St. Cyr, Katherine Forrester (Sololist)
3	"That's What I Do"	Producer, Engineer and Arranger: Classified; Live guitar: Mike Boyd Sr. Keys: Luke Boyd
4	"Inner Ninja"	Producer, Engineer and Arranger: Classified; Live guitars: David Myles, Mark Pellizer; Kids choir: Jenna DiMarco, Katherine Forrester, Shane Harte, Natasha Lizzi, Jordyn Negri, Emma Ourique, Colin Petierre, Grace Pulo, Sabrina Saudin, Julie St. Cyr
5	"Anything Goes"	Producer, Engineer and Arranger: Classified; Live guitars: Jake Boyd, Mark Pellizer; Live flute: David Christiensen; Keys: Luke Boyd; Additional vocals: Sway
6	"I Only Say It Cause It's True"	Producer, Engineer and Arranger: Classified; Live guitar: Mark Pellizer; Live flute: David Christiensen; Additional vocals: Kreesha Turner
7	"Growing Pains"	Producer, Engineer and Arranger: Classified; Live guitars: Glenn MacDonnell; Keys: Luke Boyd; Cuts: DJ IV; String orchestration: David Christiensen; Additional vocals: Ria Mae
8	"Familiar"	Producer, Engineer and Arranger: Classified; Live guitar: Mark Pellizer; Live flute: David Christiensen; Keys: Mark Pellizer; Additional vocals: Elijah Wohlmuth
9	"Hi-Dea's"	Producer, Engineer and Arranger: Classified; Keys: Mark Pellizer; String orchestration: David Christiensen
10	"Pay Day"	Producer, Engineer and Arranger: Classified; Additional vocals: Lisa Scinta, JRDN, Devine Brown; Live guitar and Piano: Mark Pellizer; String orchestration: David Christiensen
11	"New School/Old School"	Producer, Engineer and Arranger: Classified; Keys: Luke Boyd; Cuts: DJ IV; String orchestration: David Christiensen
12	"Wicked"	Producer, Engineer and Arranger: Classified; Live guitar: Mark Pellizer; Additional vocals: Elijah Wohlmuth; Small string piece: Giorgio Luciano Giannini; Vocal sample: Mellissa Britt; Baseline: Matthew Francis MacDonald, Jonathan Gaudet; Acoustic guitar: Kristof Wysocki; Handdrums: Kristofer Brian McCourt; Horns and Synth: Adam Good
13	"Look Up (Signs)"	Producer, Engineer and Arranger: Classified; Live guitar: Mark Pellizer, Glenn MacDonnell; Live sax: David Christiensen

== Chart positions ==
Chart (2013)	Peak position
Canadian Albums Chart	1
