= Classified (rapper) =

Canadian rapper and record producer (born 1977)

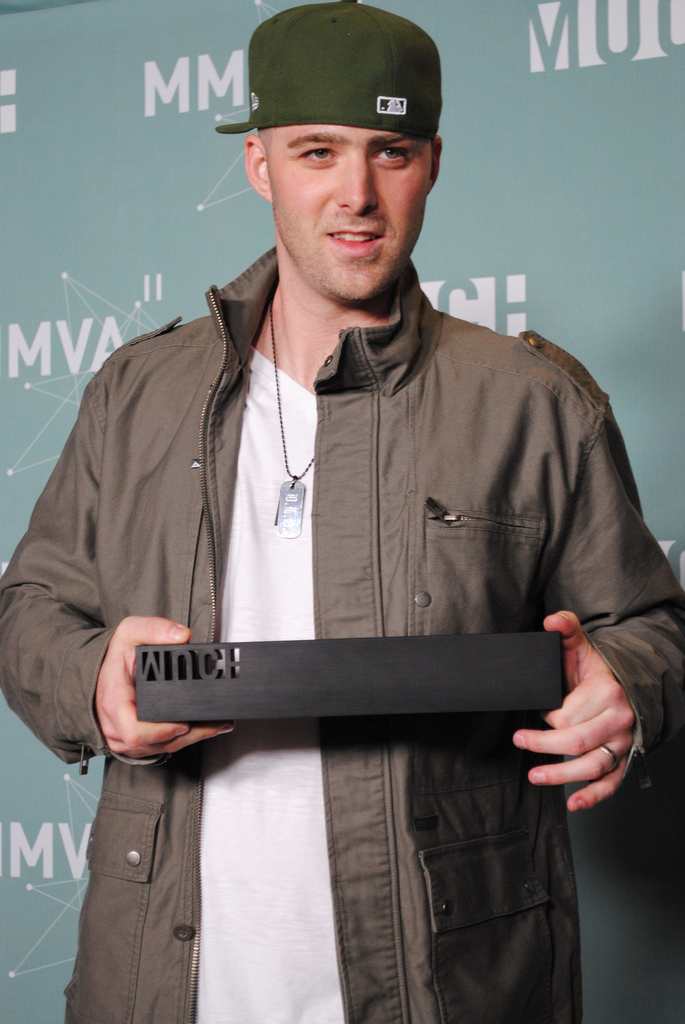
- Classified at the 2011 Much Music Video Awards

Background information
- Born: Lucas Boyd; December 13, 1977 (age 48); Enfield, Nova Scotia, Canada
- Origin: Enfield, Nova Scotia, Canada
- Genres: Hip-hop; Canadian hip-hop; East Coast hip-hop
- Occupations: Rapper; record producer; songwriter
- Years active: 1995–present
- Labels: Atlantic; Half Life Records; Urbnet; TM3; Sony BMG Canada; UMG; Universal Music Canada; Black Box Recordings
- Website: www.classifiedofficial.com

Luke Boyd (born December 13, 1977), better known by his stage name Classified, is a Canadian rapper and record producer from Enfield, Nova Scotia.

== Musical career ==
=== 1995–2004: Early beginnings ===
Boyd attended Hants East Rural High School in Milford Station, Nova Scotia. He started his own production label, Half Life Records, and released his first full-length LP titled Time's Up, Kid in 1995.

Boyd released eight studio albums and independently produced, recorded, and released his ninth album, Trial & Error. He signed a nationwide distribution deal with Toronto-based URBNET Records in 2003. The album contains collaborations with Canadian artists like Eternia and DL Incognito, as well as Canadian rap veteran Maestro. The album was one of the highest-selling independent rap albums in Canada in 2004.

With the support of Canadian grant foundation VideoFACT, Boyd released two music videos for the singles "Just the Way It Is" and "Unexpected". Boyd worked with prominent MCs in Canada including Choclair and Maestro Fresh Wes. He collaborated with Shady Records recording artist Royce da 5'9" and opened for Ludacris, Snoop Dogg, Busta Rhymes, The Game, Nelly, MC Grizzly, Captain Capota, Nas, The Black Eyed Peas and Black Moon.

=== 2005–2007: Nationwide buzz and recognition ===
Boyd's tenth album, Boy-Cott-In the Industry, marked a significant turning point in his career. The 2005 album includes guest appearances by Trent James, Royce Da 5'9", Jay Bizzy, J-Bru, A-Wall, Spesh K, and Mike Boyd (Boyd's younger brother and fellow MC). He has said he enjoys doing music with other people: "It keeps things exciting and there are tons of talented people in Halifax so you make connections 'cause it's not a huge scene." The album reached #46 on SoundScan's Canadian R&B/Hip-Hop albums chart. The singles "The Maritimes", "5th Element", "No Mistakes", and "Find Out", which is the lead single of his 11th studio album, Hitch Hikin' Music, were all Top 20 hits on MuchMusic and MTV Canada that year. The music video for "No Mistakes" won him an MMVA for MuchVibe Best Rap Video. Boy-Cott-In the Industry also earned a Juno Award nomination for Rap Recording of the Year in 2006.

Following Boy-Cott-In the Industry, Boyd released his eleventh album Hitch Hikin' Music. Like previous works, the album was self-produced. In "Fall From Paradise", Boyd reflects on the difficulty of staying fresh and on top. In the song "All About U", featuring singer Chad Hatcher, Classified shows the extent of his growth from his early releases. In "Hip Hop Star", he eschews the bling-bling culture of popular hip-hop to remind people that life is not about trying to impress others. The rest of the album includes guest appearances by Jay Bizzy, Mic Boyd, Jordan Croucher, Preacher K, White Mic and more. Four singles have been released from the album: "Find Out" (which won the 2007 East Coast Music Award for Best Rap/Hip-Hop Single), "Feelin' Fine Remix", "All About U", and "Hard to Be Hip Hop". Hitch Hikin' Music also received a Juno Award nomination for Rap Recording of the Year in 2007.

=== 2008–2017: Mainstream breakthrough and national success ===
In 2008, Boyd signed his first major label deal with Sony Music, and released his twelfth studio album, Self Explanatory, in 2009. It debuted on the Canadian Albums Chart at #25, making it Boyd's first album on that chart. The hit single "Anybody Listening" brought Boyd to mainstream success as it peaked at #52 on the Canadian Hot 100. The accompanying music video also received heavy rotation on MuchMusic. At the 2009 MuchMusic Video Awards on May 21, 2009, Boyd won the MuchVibe "Best Hip-Hop Video of the Year" award for "Anybody Listening" directed by Harv Glazer and produced by Robert Wilson of TwoThreeFiveFilms. He received three Juno Award nominations in 2010, for Rap Recording of the Year, Single of the Year, and Video of the Year respectively. Boyd would enjoy more mainstream success with another hit single, "Oh...Canada". Which peaked at #14 on the Canadian Hot 100 and was certified platinum in digital downloads by Music Canada. In early 2011, "Oh...Canada" received a Juno nomination for "Single of the Year".

On March 22, 2011, Boyd released his thirteenth album and second major studio album, Handshakes and Middle Fingers. The album debuted at #7 on the Canadian Albums Chart. The first single from the album, "That Ain't Classy", reached #45 on the Canadian Hot 100. "That Ain't Classy" also featured in the EA Sports football game Madden 12. Another song featured on the album, "Run With Me", was included in the soundtrack for NHL 13, another EA Sports title. In 2012, Boyd signed with Universal Music.

In 2013, Boyd reached the top of his music career with the release of his fourteenth album, eponymously titled Classified, which debuted at #1 on the Canadian Albums Chart, earning him his first chart-topping album that would eventually be certified Platinum by Music Canada. The first single from the album, "Inner Ninja", reached #5 on the Canadian Hot 100, earning Boyd his first top-ten hit and highest-charting song. The song has been certified 5× Platinum in digital downloads by Music Canada.

In March 2013, it was announced that Boyd signed a deal with Atlantic Records. Boyd won an award at the 2013 Juno Awards for "Rap Recording of the Year" for his song "Inner Ninja". A remix of the song featuring guest vocals from Olly Murs was released on November 10, 2013.

In March 2014, Boyd co-hosted the 2014 Juno Awards along with Serena Ryder and Johnny Reid, and released a new single "Higher" featuring B.o.B.

On January 15, 2016, Boyd released his fifteenth album Greatful. Three singles were released: "Filthy" which features DJ Premier, "No Pressure" which features Snoop Dogg (and which reached #65 on the Canadian Hot 100) and "Noah's Arch" which features Saukrates. The album debuted at #6 on the Canadian Albums Chart. Boyd announced he would be touring across Canada from February to March in support of the album.

Boyd co-wrote and produced Ria Mae's hit song "Thoughts On Fire" and raps on the "Thoughts on Fire (feat. Classified)" version which was on heavy rotation in early 2017 on the CBC Radio 2 network.

=== 2018–present: Longevity and latest projects ===
On February 9, 2018, Boyd filmed a music video for "Powerless" in Nova Scotia, featuring native dancers and musicians and bringing to light the issues surrounding missing and murdered Indigenous women and girls. On May 8, 2018, Boyd released another new single called "Changes" featuring Anjulie. On May 25, 2018, Boyd released another single "She Ain't Gotta Do Much". Later that month, Boyd announced his new EP Tomorrow Could Be.... The EP was released on June 29, 2018. On September 14, 2018, Boyd announced that his new album Tomorrow Could Be the Day Things Change would be released on October 12. The first single from the album, "Cold Love", featuring Tory Lanez, was released the same day.

On September 20, 2020, Boyd released an eight-song EP called Time. "Good News", which features Breagh Isabel, was one of the singles off the EP. It was certified Gold in Canada and appeared on John Krasinski's Some Good News.

On June 29, 2022, Boyd released Retrospected (Acoustic) which is an album consisting of acoustic versions of all his hit singles such as "Day Doesn't Die", "Accept It", "Inner Ninja", "Good News" and "All About You (Feat. Breagh Isabel and Brett Matthews)".

Boyd explores how he went from being a small-town teen to a big name in the music industry in the book Classified: Off the Beat 'N Path, which was released on April 30 2021.

In the memoir, Boyd touches on overcoming the challenges of being a young, aspiring music artist on the East Coast, the importance of home and staying humble during success.

"Life's a journey, not a destination," Boyd told Jeff Douglas, the host of CBC Radio's Mainstreet, in an interview at his home in Enfield, N.S., adding "My only scale of success is that I can come out to my studio every day and make a beat."

In 2024, Boyd released his most recent album Luke's View.

== Personal life ==
Boyd is married to Kim Boyd, with whom he has three children. He has a song named "Having Kids Is Easy" on his 2016 album Greatful, dedicated to his daughters. He also has two brothers, Mike and Jake Boyd, and one sister, Leah Boyd. Mike is a frequent collaborator with Classified and has produced multiple albums with him.

== Discography ==
=== Studio albums ===
- Time's Up, Kid (1995)
- One Shot (1996)
- What Happened (1996)
- Information (1997)
- Now Whut! (1998)
- Touch of Class (1999)
- Unpredictable (2000)
- Union Dues (2001)
- Trial & Error (2003)
- Boy-Cott-In the Industry (2005)
- Hitch Hikin' Music (2006)
- Self Explanatory (2009)
- Handshakes and Middle Fingers (2011)
- Classified (2013)
- Greatful (2016)
- Tomorrow Could Be the Day Things Change (2018)
- Luke's View (2024)

=== EPs ===
- iTunes Session (2013)
- Tomorrow Could Be... (2018)
- Time (2020)

=== Compilations ===
- While You Were Sleeping (2007)

=== Remix albums ===
- Retrospected (Acoustic) (2022)

=== Mixtapes ===
- The Joint Effort (2012)

== Awards and nominations ==
Year	Nominated work	Award	Result
2006	"Boy-Cott-In the Industry"	Juno Rap Recording of the Year	Nominated
2006	"No Mistakes"	MuchMusic Video Awards MuchVibe Best Rap Video	Won
2007	"Hitch Hikin' Music"	Juno Rap Recording of the Year	Nominated
2007	"Find Out"	MuchMusic Video Awards MuchVibe Best Rap Video	Nominated
2007	"Find Out"	MuchMusic Video Awards Best Independent Video	Nominated
2008	"Hard To Be Hip Hop"	MuchMusic Video Awards Best Post-Production	Nominated
2008	"Hard To Be Hip Hop"	MuchMusic Video Awards MuchVibe Best Rap Video	Nominated
2009	"Anybody Listening"	MuchMusic Video Awards Best Post Production	Nominated
2009	"Anybody Listening"	MuchMusic Video Awards Best Director	Nominated
2009	"Anybody Listening"	MuchMusic Video Awards MuchVibe Best Hip Hop Video	Won
2010	"Anybody Listening"	Juno Single of the Year	Nominated
2010	"Anybody Listening"	Juno Video of the Year	Nominated
2010	"Self Explanatory"	Juno Rap Recording of the Year	Nominated
2010	"Quit While You're Ahead"	MuchMusic Video Awards Post Production of the Year	Nominated
2010	"Oh...Canada"	MuchMusic Video Awards Director of the Year	Nominated
2010	"Oh...Canada"	MuchMusic Video Awards MuchVibe Hip Hop Video of the Year	Nominated
2011	"Oh...Canada"	Juno Single of the Year	Nominated
2011	"That Ain't Classy"	MuchMusic Video Awards MuchVibe Hip Hop Video of the Year	Won
2012	"Handshakes and Middle Fingers"	Juno Rap Recording of the Year	Nominated
2012	"The Hangover"	MuchMusic Video Awards MuchVibe Hip Hop Video of the Year	Nominated
2013	"Inner Ninja"	Juno Rap Recording of the Year	Won
2013	"Inner Ninja"	MuchMusic Video Awards Video of the Year	Won
2013	"Inner Ninja"	MuchMusic Video Awards Hip Hop Video of the Year	Nominated
2013	"Inner Ninja"	MuchMusic Video Awards MuchFACT Video of the Year	Won
2013	"Inner Ninja"	MuchMusic Video Awards Your Fave Video	Nominated
2014	"Inner Ninja"	East Coast Music Awards Fans choice Video of the Year	Nominated
2014	"Inner Ninja"	East Coast Music Awards Rap/Hip-Hop Recording of the Year	Nominated
2014	"Inner Ninja"	East Coast Music Awards Song of the Year (Inner Ninja)	Nominated
2014	"Classified"	East Coast Music Awards Album of the Year	Nominated
2014	"Classified"	East Coast Music Awards Songwriter of the Year (David Myles ft. Classified - So Blind)	Nominated
2017	Greatful	East Coast Music Awards Album of the Year	Nominated
2017	"No Pressure"	East Coast Music Awards Song of the Year	Won
2017	Greatful	East Coast Music Awards Rap/Hip-Hop Recording of the Year	Won
2017	Greatful	East Coast Music Awards Solo Recording of the Year	Nominated
2017	Classified	East Coast Music Awards Fan's Choice Entertainer of the Year	Nominated
2017	"Work Away" (ft. David Myles)	East Coast Music Awards Fan's Choice Video of the Year	Nominated
2017	"Work Away" (ft. David Myles)	East Coast Music Awards Video of the Year	Won
2017	Classified	East Coast Music Awards Producer of the Year	Nominated
2017	Classified	East Coast Music Awards Studio Engineer of the Year	Nominated
2019	"Powerless"	Juno Video of the Year	Nominated
2019	Tomorrow Could Be The Day Things Change	East Coast Music Awards Album of the Year	Won
2019	"Powerless"	East Coast Music Awards Fans' Choice Video of the Year	Nominated
2019	Tomorrow Could Be The Day Things Change	East Coast Music Awards Rap/Hip-Hop Recording of the Year	Won
2020	Tomorrow Could Be The Day Things Change	Juno Rap Recording of the Year	Nominated
2021	"Good News" f. Breagh Isabel	East Coast Music Awards Fans' Choice Video of the Year	Nominated
2021	Classified	East Coast Music Awards Fans' Choice Entertainer of the Year	Nominated
2021	Time EP	East Coast Music Awards Album of the Year	Nominated
2021	Classified	East Coast Music Awards Songwriter of the Year	Nominated
2021	"Good News" f. Breagh Isabel	East Coast Music Awards Song of the Year	Nominated
2021	Time EP	East Coast Music Awards Solo Recording of the Year	Nominated
2021	Time EP	East Coast Music Awards Rap/Hip-Hop Recording of the Year	Nominated
2021	Classified	East Coast Music Awards Producer of the Year	Nominated
2022	Classified	East Coast Music Awards Fans' Choice Entertainer of the Year	Nominated
	“Accept It (Retrospected)”	East Coast Music Awards Fans' Choice Video of the Year	Nominated
	Retrospected	East Coast Music Awards Album of the Year	Nominated
	Classified	East Coast Music Awards Artist Innovator of the Year	Nominated
	Retrospected	East Coast Music Awards Rap/Hip-Hop Recording of the Year	Nominated
	Classified	East Coast Music Awards Producer of the Year	Nominated

== Books ==
- Classified: Off the Beat 'N Path (2021)

== See also ==
- Canadian hip hop
- Music of Canada
