= 2023 Nova Scotia floods =

Series of floods in Nova Scotia, Canada

- Date: July 21-22, 2023
- Cause: Heavy rains
- Deaths: 4
- Property damage: $200 million (2023 USD)

The 2023 Nova Scotia floods were a series of floods in the province of Nova Scotia, Canada. Areas in Nova Scotia received 250mm (9.8 inches) of rain in a 24 hour period, causing flash floods.

On July 22, 2023, a state of emergency was declared in the province, scheduled to last two weeks, ending on August 5. The floods greatly affected the municipalities of Halifax, East Hants, West Hants, as well as the counties of Lunenburg and Queens with estimates of up to 300 millimetres of rain in parts of the province.

== Aftermath ==
Following the flooding, four people were reported missing. The body of a missing man was found in West Hants on July 24 and unidentified remains of a missing person were found in nearby Kings County. The Royal Canadian Mounted Police announced on July 25, 2023, that the remains of two children were found in Brooklyn, Nova Scotia, which included the unidentified body that was found the previous day, bringing the death toll to three. The remaining missing person, an unidentified youth under 18 years of age, remained missing with the search suspended on July 31. Remaining high water impeded the search area, and plans were made to resume the search once the search area drained, but the body was discovered on August 1st, by a citizen walking their dog, approximately 75 kilometers away from the site of the disappearance.

Many roads, highways, driveways, and bridges were damaged or washed out. The province announced that 500 sections of roadway and 48 bridges across the province had been damaged. The only train line connecting the Port of Halifax to the rest of the country was damaged, with a section south of Truro, Nova Scotia, being washed out. The train line was repaired and operational by Thursday July 27th. The East Hants Aquatic Centre was severely damaged by flooding, with several feet of water accumulating in its basement and several inches on its upper level.

== See also ==
- Nova Scotia Guard, established after the floods
