= Renfrew, Nova Scotia =

Community in Nova Scotia, Canada

Renfrew
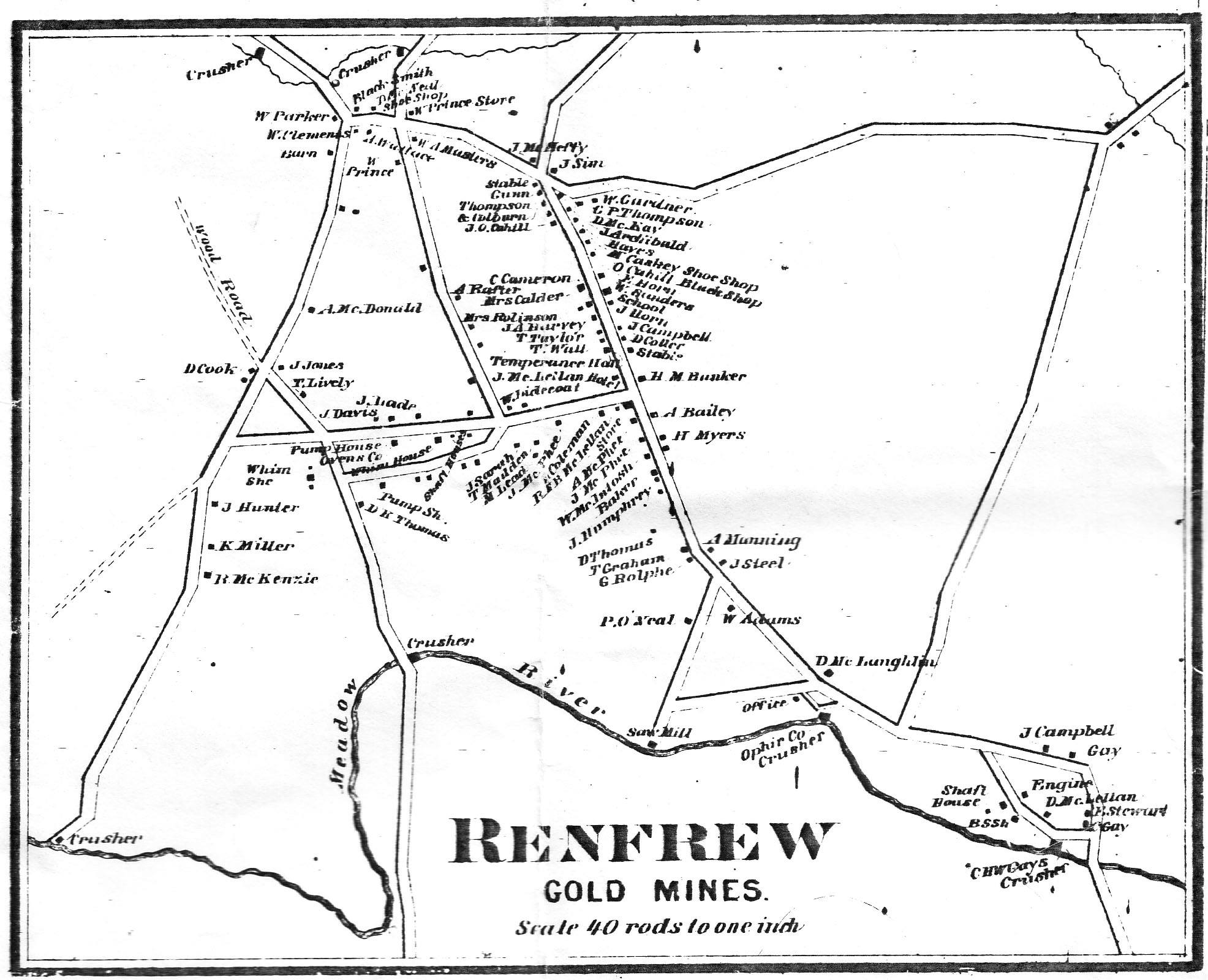
- Map of Renfrew, 1871

- Location within Nova Scotia
- Coordinates: 45°0′22″N 63°37′47″W
- Country: Canada
- Province: Nova Scotia
- Municipality: East Hants Municipality
- District: 3
- Named for: Edward VII, Baron of Renfrew
- Highest elevation: 170 m (560 ft)
- Lowest elevation: 30 m (98 ft)
- Time zone: UTC-4 (AST)
  - Summer (DST): UTC-3 (ADT)
- Postal code: B2S
- Area code: 902
- GNBC Code: CBFPN
- Highways: Trunk 14

Renfrew is a ghost town in the Canadian province of Nova Scotia, located in East Hants Municipality in Hants County. Its namesake is Edward VII, who held the title Baron of Renfrew. The area was the site of some of the most successful gold mines in the Maritimes. Renfrew became a locality of Nine Mile River in 2007.

Edmond Henry Horne of Enfield apprenticed here, learning his trade in the Renfrew gold mines before going on to discover the Noranda deposit in Quebec.

== See also ==
- List of ghost towns in Nova Scotia
- Royal eponyms in Canada
