= Nova Scotia Guard =

Canadian emergency response group

- Logo of the Nova Scotia Guard

Agency overview
- Formed: 20 September 2024; 18 months ago
- Jurisdiction: Government of Nova Scotia
- Parent department: Emergency Management Department
- Website: nsguard.ca

The Nova Scotia Guard is a Canadian volunteer emergency response organization in Nova Scotia. The Guard was established on 20 September 2024 following the passing of provincial legislation introduced by Premier Tim Houston, and is overseen by the provincial Department of Emergency Management which was created by the same legislation. The Guard provides logistics support to emergency response groups and first responders in the province, first being deployed in May 2025 to assist in a search for missing children.

== History ==
On 28 March 2024, the Premier of Nova Scotia Tim Houston put forward An Act to Establish a Department of Emergency Management and Authorize the Establishment of a Nova Scotia Guard in the Nova Scotia House of Assembly. The act created a new provincial government department, the Department of Emergency Management, as well as the Nova Scotia Guard. In announcing the act, Houston stated that "anyone with useable skills" could register for the Nova Scotia Guard, which would act as pool of volunteers to support first responders in emergencies. The decision to create the Guard was influenced by the flooding crisis in the province a year prior. The act passed the legislature and received royal assent on 20 September 2024, following amendments allowing for the creation of regional emergency operations centres within the province.

Existing emergency response organizations were critical of the act. Search and rescue volunteers in the province argued that existing infrastructure for emergency response was underfunded, questioning the decision to create a new organization rather than fund existing networks. The President of Eastern Shore Ground Search and Rescue described it as "a slap in the face". Houston defended the act, calling it "a very, very positive thing."

The Nova Scotia Guard was deployed for the first time in a search for missing children in Pictou County in May 2025. The Guard assisted with the search by providing logistics support in distribution of supplies, protection of equipment, and directing search crews.

== Role ==
The Emergency Management Department is the provincial government department that oversees the Nova Scotia Guard. The department was created alongside the Guard, and replaced the province's Emergency Management Office. The department oversees a variety of emergency response teams within the government, and fulfills other responsibilities in regards to emergency and disaster preparedness and response.

The purpose of the Nova Scotia Guard as outlined in the Emergency Preparedness and Nova Scotia Guard Act is to "ensure that people, skills, goods and services are available in an emergency, critical incident or other time of need"; as well as providing support in the areas of public safety, emergency preparedness and response, and promoting Nova Scotian pride.

== See also ==
- Public Safety Canada
