= David Myles (musician) =

Canadian songwriter, musician and politician (born 1981)

David Myles MP
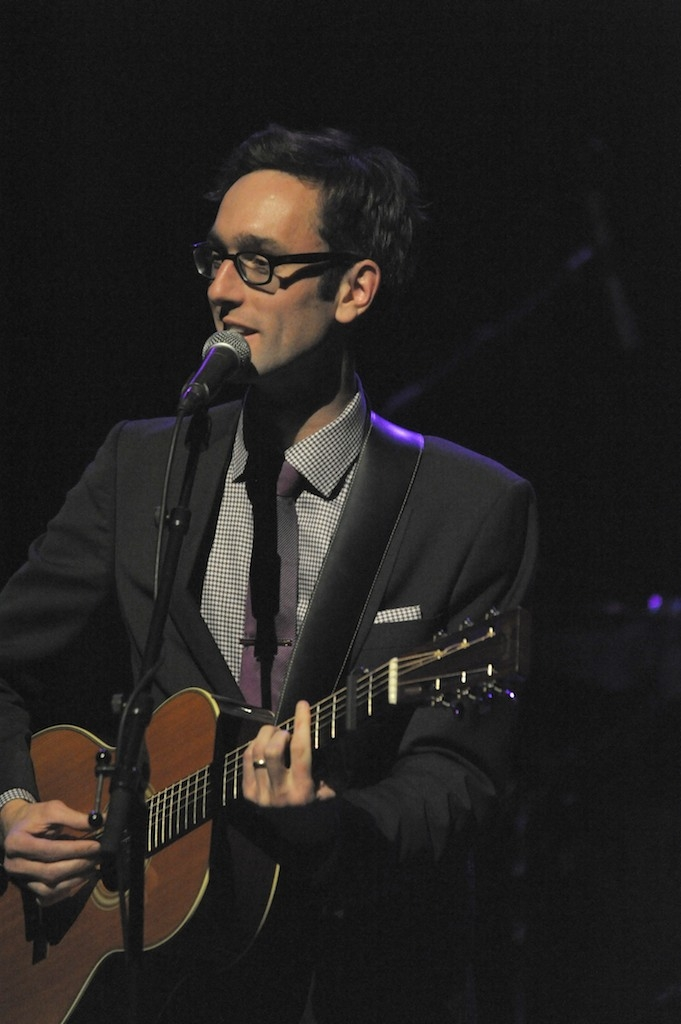
- Myles performing in 2011

Background information
- Born: David Patrick Thomas Myles; May 12, 1981 (age 45); Fredericton, New Brunswick, Canada
- Occupations: Songwriter, performer, recording artist, politician
- Instruments: Vocals, guitar, trumpet
- Years active: 2003–present
- Labels: Fontana North Distribution, Little Tiny Records, Turtlemusik
- Website: www.davidmyles.com

Member of Parliament for Fredericton—Oromocto
- Incumbent
- Assumed office April 28, 2025
- Preceded by: Jenica Atwin

Personal details
- Party: Liberal
- Website: Official website

David Patrick Thomas Myles MP (born May 12, 1981) is a Canadian politician, songwriter, and musician born in Fredericton, New Brunswick. He was elected as the member of Parliament (MP) for Fredericton—Oromocto in the 2025 Canadian federal election.

Myles lives in Fredericton, New Brunswick, as of September 2020, moving from Halifax, Nova Scotia. His music has often been labeled folk jazz, although he prefers simply to call it "roots" music. An independent artist who self-releases his albums, Myles has been able to gain an increasingly large audience, in part because of his active touring schedule and in part because of his cross-genre musical collaborations, including the Canadian hit single "Inner Ninja" with the rapper Classified.

Myles is married to Nina Corfu. They have two young daughters.

== Background ==
While growing up in Fredericton, Myles began playing trumpet at 10 years old and played in school bands. He attended Mount Allison University in Sackville, New Brunswick and graduated in 2003 with a Bachelor of Arts (Honours) in political science. He was in China as a foreign exchange student in 2001 when he bought his first guitar. He has said that learning to play the guitar and write songs was what propelled him to become a professional musician.

== Musical career ==
Myles released his first album, Together and Alone, in 2005. Before it was released, he relocated to Calgary, Alberta. He returned to the Maritimes in 2006, moving to Halifax. There, he released his second album, Things Have Changed, which exposed him to national and international audiences. The album earned him industry recognition in the form of two Music Nova Scotia Awards, as well as nominations for both the 2007 Canadian Folk Music Best New Artist Award and the East Coast Music Awards Galaxie Rising Star Recording of the Year. His original song, "When it Comes My Turn," took home first place in the International Songwriting Competition and was the winning song at the 2008 Chris Austin Merlefest Songwriting Contest.

In May 2008, Myles released his third solo project, On the Line, which demonstrates his vocal versatility and musical dexterity. On the Line is a powerful and stylish blend of jazz, blues, gospel, pop and folk influences that has garnered awards and nominations, including the 2009 ECMA Folk Recording of the Year Award.

In May 2009, Myles was awarded the Mount Allison University Contemporary Achievement Award from the University's Alumni Association. It is presented to a recent graduate for "outstanding achievement".

Myles was one of thirteen songwriters chosen in the first CBC Radio 2 Great Canadian Song Quest in 2009. He was chosen to represent New Brunswick by a public vote, and commissioned to write a song about the Bay of Fundy's historic Hopewell Rocks. He recorded a new song, "Don't Drive Through," for the contest. Asked about the song, Myles said, "I wanted this tune to really resonate with New Brunswickers. Don't Drive Through is a lighthearted song that relates to the idea of driving through the province. I tried to create a song that I could sing forever, not just record as part of CBC's Canadian songbook, and I think I have."

In 2010, he performed at the Canadian Deep Roots Music Festival in Wolfville, Nova Scotia. as well as other locations such as Granville Green in Cape Breton, Nova Scotia. In December, he played for four nights at The Carleton Music Bar in Halifax, Nova Scotia. Unbeknownst to him, the music bar's sound technician recorded the performances, capturing relaxed live shows. Those recordings became the source for his next album, Live at The Carleton.

In 2011, he received five nominations in the East Coast Music Awards and was nominated for a Music New Brunswick award. He played at the Harvest Jazz and Blues Festival in Fredericton, New Brunswick. He released two albums, Live at The Carleton and Into The Sun (October, 2011). Into the Sun uses world music rhythms from Brazilian and African music.

In the same year, Nova Scotia rapper Classified featured Myles on the song "The Day Doesn't Die" from his album Handshakes and Middle Fingers. Although he was left uncredited in some cases, this song gained him more exposure in the hip-hop world as well as a larger fan base.

In 2013, Myles and Classified reunited for the single "Inner Ninja" from the album Classified. The single went triple platinum in Canada and won a Juno Award.

Also in 2013, Myles released the double album In the Nighttime, on which he gave each of his two separate performing personas (mellow and jazz-influenced on the one hand, beat-oriented and pop-influenced on the other) its own disc of music.

In 2014, Myles was a 'Featured Musician' on the YouTube channel of The Great Canadian Journey, a cross-country project that highlights local musicians, print artists, and culture. Also in 2014, Myles was nominated for six East Coast Music Awards (see "Awards and Achievements," below).

In the fall of 2014, Myles released a Christmas album entitled It's Christmas. The idea of the album suggested itself in part because of Myles' annual "Singing For Supper" tour in Eastern Canada every December, which raises money and donates food for those in need. The concerts take place in a variety of shopping malls in New Brunswick. A portion of the sales of the It's Christmas album continues to be donated to food banks where the album is for sale.

On October 4, 2014, Myles began hosting The East Coast Music Hour with David Myles on Saturday mornings, a new performance program in Atlantic Canada that blended two regional music programs - Atlantic Airwaves that aired in the Maritimes and The Performance Hour that was broadcast in Newfoundland and Labrador.

In January 2015, Myles was named Touring Artist of the Year at the CAPACOA (Canadian Arts Presenting Association) Awards for the 2013–14 season.

Myles released his first US album, entitled So Far, in September 2015. The album contains stripped-down re-recordings of previously released songs, as a way of introducing his work to a new audience.

In April 2016, Myles released yet another collaboration with Classified, entitled Here Now, a six-song EP produced by Classified, on which Myles departs from his well-known jazz-folk vibe, influenced by his love of R&B, and offers something a bit more hip-hop and mod-pop.

On September 15, 2017, Myles released his tenth studio recording, Real Love, a nostalgia-tinged ode to classic rock and roll. The record was released in the US and worldwide on January 26, 2018.

September 14, 2018 brought the unveiling of David's first French-language album, Le grand départ via L-A be Records.

A busy fall for Myles, he also began hosting a Saturday morning music show entitled Myles From Home, broadcast by Alberta's CKUA Radio Network on September 15, 2018.

October 26, 2018 saw the release of a stripped-down, acoustic version of Real Love.

Myles also released his first Children's book in the Fall of 2018 from Nimbus Publishing based on his song "Santa Never Brings Me a Banjo", with illustration by animator Murray Bain.

In June 2020, David began a series via YouTube Live, entitled "Myles From Home: A Not-So-Late-Night Talk Show", where he interviews and speaks with other musicians from the comfort of their own home. This series later evolved into a Podcast under the same name, with some exclusive podcast episodes as well as the YouTube show episodes released in an audio format.

On May 8, 2020, Myles released his 14th album Leave Tonight.

In August 2021, David released his first instrumental album, That Tall Distance, which later won the 2022 Juno Award for Instrumental Album of the Year.

== Political career ==
In March 2025, Myles announced that he would be seeking the Liberal nomination for the riding of Fredericton—Oromocto in the 2025 Canadian federal election, with the party announcing his nomination on March 23. Myles won his riding in 2025 by a margin of over 14,000 votes. Myles and incumbent Carleton Liberal MP Bruce Fanjoy are third cousins through their shared great-great-grandparents.

== Electoral record ==
2025 Canadian federal election: Fredericton—Oromocto
Party	Candidate	Votes	%	±%	Expenditures
Liberal	David Myles	30,750	61.29	+23.51	$104,116.35
Conservative	Brian Macdonald	16,200	32.29	-2.22	$101,916.42
Green	Pam Allen-Leblanc	1,568	3.13	-9.76	$64,109.83
New Democratic	Nicki Lyons-MacFarlane	908	1.81	-11.19	$304.25
Canadian Future	Dominic Cardy	345	0.69	N/A	$737.30
People's	Heather Michaud	208	0.41	+0.07	$18.03
Communist	June Patterson	146	0.29	-0.05	$0.00
Centrist	Brandon Ellis	44	0.09	N/A	$711.00
Total valid votes		50,169	99.52	+0.17	$120,219.77
Total rejected ballots		243	0.48	–0.17	
Turnout		50,412	75.75	+9.84	
Eligible voters (Note: Number of eligible voters does not include election day registrations.)		66,550			
Liberal notional hold		Swing		+12.86	
Source: Elections Canada

== Discography ==
=== Albums ===
- Together and Alone (2005)
- Things Have Changed (2006)
- On The Line (2008)
- Turn Time Off (2010)
- Live at The Carleton (2011)
- Into The Sun (2011)
- In the Nighttime (2013)
- It's Christmas (2014)
- So Far (2015)
- Here Now (2016)
- Real Love (2017)
- Le Grand Départ (2018)
- Real Love (Acoustic) (2018)
- Leave Tonight (2020)
- That Tall Distance (2021)
- It's Only a Little Loneliness (2022)
- Devil Talking (2024)

=== EPs ===
- The After Party (2013)

=== Guest appearances ===
- "The Day Doesn't Die"; artist: Classified; album: Handshakes and Middle Fingers (2011)
- "Whole to My Half"; artist: Measha Brueggergosman; album: I've Got a Crush on You (2012)
- "Inner Ninja"; artist: Classified; album: Classified (2013)
- "In 1-2-3-4"; artist: Alex Cuba; album: Healer (2015)
- "Work Away"; artist: Classified; album: Greatful (2016)
- "Wondering (How To Believe)"; artist: R.A the Rugged Man (2020)

== Bibliography ==
- Santa Never Brings Me A Banjo Illustrated by Murray Bain, Nimbus Publishing (2018)

== Awards and achievements ==
- 2025
  - International Acoustic Music Awards Runner Up - "Still Missing You" - Folk/Americana/Roots Category
- 2024
  - Unsigned Only Music Competition Honorable Mention - "Break Free" - Folk/Singer-Songwriter Category
  - Honorary Doctor of Laws (LLD), Mount Allison University
  - Cultural Fellow, UNB's J. Herbert Smith Centre for Technology Management and Entrepreneurship
- 2023
  - ECMA Award Winner Album of the Year – It's Only a Little Loneliness
  - ECMA Award Winner Solo Recording of the Year – It's Only a Little Loneliness
  - ECMA Contemporary Roots Recording of the Year Nominee
  - ECMA TD Fans' Choice Entertainer of the Year Nominee
- 2022
  - JUNO Award Winner Instrumental Album of the Year – That Tall Distance
  - ECMA Nominee Instrumental Recording of the Year - That Tall Distance
- 2021
  - ECMA Award Winner Folk Recording of the Year - Leave Tonight
  - ECMA Award Nominee Songwriter of the Year
  - ECMA Award Nominee Solo Recording of the Year - Leave Tonight
  - ECMA Award Nominee Fans' Choice Entertainer of the Year
- 2019
  - Honorary Doctor of Letters, St. Thomas University
- 2018
  - Music Nova Scotia Award Winner Recording of the Year – Real Love
  - Music Nova Scotia Award Winner Americana/Bluegrass Recording of the Year – Real Love
  - Music Nova Scotia Award Nomination Solo Recording of the Year – Real Love
  - Music Nova Scotia Award Nomination Entertainer of the Year
  - ECMA Solo Recording of the Year Nominee
  - ECMA Songwriter of the Year Nominee
  - ECMA Entertainer of the Year Nominee
- 2017
  - ECMA Award Winner Video of the Year – Classified ft. David Myles - "Work Away"
  - ECMA Award Nomination Song of the Year – "It Don’t Matter" Prod. Classified
- 2016
  - Music Nova Scotia Award Nomination Entertainer of the Year
  - Music Nova Scotia Award Nomination Digital Artist of the Year
  - Music Nova Scotia Award Nomination Recording of the Year – Here Now
  - Music Nova Scotia Award Nomination Pop Recording of the Year – Here Now
  - International Acoustic Music Awards Winner Folk/Americana/Roots Category – "Need A Break"
  - International Acoustic Music Awards Nomination Country/Bluegrass Category – "Need A Break"
  - International Acoustic Music Awards Nomination Best Male Artist – "I Will Love You"
  - ECMA Award Nomination Video of the Year – "Santa Never Brings Me A Banjo"
  - ECMA Award Nomination Fan's Choice Video of the Year – "Santa Never Brings Me A Banjo"
- 2015
  - USA Songwriting Competition Finalist (RnB Category) - "Do It All Again" (co-written with Dylan Guthro and Classified (rapper), performed by Dylan Guthro)
  - Music/Musique NB Award Winner Expat of the Year
  - Music Nova Scotia Award Nomination Music Video of the Year – "Santa Never Brings Me a Banjo"
  - Unsigned Only Music Competition Honourable Mention Winner Folk/Singer-Songwriter category – "I Wouldn’t Dance"
  - ECMA Award Nomination Fans’ Choice Entertainer of the Year
  - CAPACOA Award Winner Touring Artist of the Year – 2013/2014 Season
- 2014
  - Great American Song Contest Finalist – "I Wouldn’t Dance"
  - International Songwriting Competition Honorable Mention Folk/Singer-Songwriter category – "I Wouldn’t Dance"
  - Music Nova Scotia Award Nomination – Entertainer of the Year
  - JUNO Award Nomination Single of the Year – "Inner Ninja"
  - Indie Music Award Winner Collaboration of the Year – "Inner Ninja"
  - Indie Music Award Nomination Single of the Year – "Inner Ninja"
  - Indie Music Award Nomination Best-Selling Independent Release of the Year – "Inner Ninja"
  - Canadian Radio Music Award Nomination SOCAN Song of the Year – "Inner Ninja"
  - Canadian Radio Music Award Nomination Best New Group or Solo Artist: Hot AC – "Inner Ninja"
  - ECMA Award Nomination Solo Recording of the Year – In the Nighttime
  - ECMA Award Nomination Album of the Year – In the Nighttime
  - ECMA Award Nomination Songwriter of the Year – "So Blind"
  - ECMA Award Nomination Folk Recording of the Year – In the Nighttime
  - ECMA Award Nomination Song of the Year – "Inner Ninja"
  - ECMA Award Nomination Fan's Choice Video of the Year – "Inner Ninja"
- 2013
  - Best Selling Rap single in Canadian history – "Inner Ninja"
  - JUNO Award Winner Rap Recording of the Year – "Inner Ninja"
  - MMVA Award Winner MuchFact Video of the Year – "Inner Ninja"
  - MMVA Award Winner Video of the Year – "Inner Ninja"
  - SOCAN No. 1 Award – "Inner Ninja"
  - ECMA Award Nomination Folk Recording of the Year – Into The Sun
  - ECMA Award Nomination Fan's Choice Entertainer of the Year
  - ECMA Award Nomination Fan's Choice Video of the Year – "Long Dark Night"
  - British Columbia Touring Council Award Nomination 2013 Artist/Artistic Company of the Year
  - Music Nova Scotia Award Winner SOCAN Songwriter of the Year – "Inner Ninja"
  - Music Nova Scotia Award Winner Music Video of the Year – "Inner Ninja"
  - Music Nova Scotia Award Nomination Male Artist Recording of the Year – In the Nighttime
  - Music Nova Scotia Award Nomination Digital Artist of the Year
  - Music New Brunswick Award Nomination Expat Artist of the Year
  - CBC Radio 2 Top 100 Songs of 2013 – "Maureen" (#74) and "So Blind" (#12)
  - Music New Brunswick Award Nomination Expat Artist of the Year
  - Much Music Video Award, MuchFact Video of the Year – "Inner Ninja"
  - Much Music Video Award, Video of the Year – "Inner Ninja"
- 2012
  - SOCAN Award Winner Folk/Roots Music
  - ECMA Award Winner Songwriter of the Year
  - ECMA Award Winner Song of the Year – "Simple Pleasures"
  - ECMA Award Nomination Folk Recording of the Year – Live at The Carleton
  - ECMA Award Nomination Fan's Choice Entertainer of the Year
  - ECMA Award Nomination Fan's Choice Video of the Year – "Simple Pleasures"
  - Music Nova Scotia Award Winner Male Artist Recording of the Year – Into The Sun
  - Music Nova Scotia Award Nomination Recording of the Year – Into The Sun
  - Music Nova Scotia Award Nomination Entertainer of the Year
  - International Songwriting Competition Adult Contemporary Semi-finalist – "Love Again"
  - TV placement for "Simple Pleasures," "Run," and "Ooh La La" on Packed to the Rafters, Australia's highest rated drama series.
- 2011
  - Canadian Folk Music Award Nomination Best Contemporary Singer
  - ECMA Award Winner Folk Recording of the Year – Turn Time Off
  - ECMA Award Winner Group Single of the Year – "Need A Break"
  - ECMA Award Nomination Entertainer of the Year
  - ECMA Award Nomination Recording of the Year – Turn Time Off
  - ECMA Award Nomination Male Solo Recording of the Year – Turn Time Off
  - Music Nova Scotia Award Winner Male Artist Recording of the Year – Live at The Carleton
  - Music Nova Scotia Award Winner Folk Recording of the Year – Live at The Carleton
  - Music New Brunswick Award Winner Expat Artist of the Year
- 2010
  - Canadian Folk Music Award Nomination Solo Artist of the Year
  - ECMA Award Nomination Entertainer of the Year
  - Music Nova Scotia Award Winner Male Artist of the Year
  - Music Nova Scotia Award Winner Folk Recording of the Year – Turn Time Off
  - Music New Brunswick Award Nomination Expat Artist of the Year
- 2009
  - Great American Song Contest First Place Winner Contemporary Acoustic/Folk Category – "When It Comes My Turn"
  - ECMA Award Winner Folk Recording of the Year – On The Line
  - ECMA Award Nomination Male Solo Recording of the Year – On The Line
  - ECMA Award Nomination Entertainer of the Year
  - Mount Allison University Alumni Early Achievement Award Winner
- 2008
  - Music Nova Scotia Award Nomination Album of the Year - On The Line
  - Music Nova Scotia Award Nomination Entertainer of the Year
  - Music Nova Scotia Award Nomination Folk Recording of the Year
  - Music Nova Scotia Award Nomination Songwriter of the Year
  - Music Nova Scotia Award Nomination Male Artist Recording of the Year
  - CBC Radio 3 Bucky Adams Award Most Canadian Song Nomination – "Cape Breton"
  - Chris Austin (Merlefest) Songwriting Contest Winner, Folk Category – "When It Comes My Turn"
- 2007
  - Music Nova Scotia Award Nomination Folk/Roots Recording of the Year - Things Have Changed
  - Music Nova Scotia Award Winner Male Artist of the Year
  - Canadian Folk Music Award Nomination Best New Artist
  - ECMA Awards Galaxie Rising Star Recording of the Year Nomination – Things Have Changed
- 2006
  - International Songwriting Competition Winner, Folk Category – "When It Comes My Turn"
  - John Lennon Songwriting Contest Finalist, Folk Singer-Songwriter Category – "When It Comes My Turn"
