= Greatful =

Studio album by Classified
- Released: January 15, 2016 (Canada/U.S.)
- Genre: Hip-hop
- Length: 62:22
- Label: Halflife Records/Universal Music Canada
- Producer: Classified

Classified chronology
Classified (2013)	Greatful (2016)	Tomorrow Could Be... (2018)

Professional ratings
Review scores
Source	Rating
Exclaim!	6/10
NOW	5/5 stars

Greatful is the fourth major release studio album by Canadian rapper Classified released on January 15, 2016, on Halflife Records, distributed by Universal Music Canada, and serves as his fifteenth album overall with 16 tracks. The first single released, "No Pressure" featuring Snoop Dogg, peaked at number 65 on the Canadian Hot 100. The second single "Filthy" features DJ Premier. The third single "Noah's Arc" features Saukrates. The album debuted at number 6 on the Canadian Albums Chart.

== Background ==
According to Classified, he spent a long time working on the album and describes it as his magnum opus and most authentic project to date. He says "This album feels like what I've been working towards my whole career.......It took me longer than any other album, it's more personal and I got to work with my heroes in hip-hop. I'm excited to get this out to the fans who have listening to me since day one and the newer listeners who just started listening." In October 2015, he announced he will be going on tour across Canada in support of the album.

== Track listing ==
No.	Title	Length
1.	"Filthy" (featuring DJ Premier)	3:23
2.	"No Pressure" (featuring Snoop Dogg)	4:11
3.	"Beautiful Escape"	3:52
4.	"Noah's Arc" (featuring Saukrates)	3:44
5.	"Heavy Head"	3:36
6.	"Square"	4:21
7.	"Having Kids Is Easy"	3:39
8.	"Work Away" (featuring David Myles)	3:45
9.	"Oh No"	3:21
10.	"It's Hard to Understand"	3:12
11.	"Hoody and a Ballcap"	3:46
12.	"Video Games" (featuring Mike Boyd)	3:58
13.	"All My Life" (featuring Ria Mae)	3:45
14.	"Grand Slam"	3:41
15.	"Never Stop the Show" (featuring Snak the Ripper and Slug of Atmosphere)	4:11
16.	"Best of Me (Closing Ceremonies)"	5:57

== Charts ==
Chart (2016)	Peak position
Canadian Albums (Billboard)	6
