= Tomorrow Could Be... =

EP by Classified
- Released: June 29, 2018
- Genre: Hip hop
- Label: Halflife Records
- Producer: Classified

Classified chronology
| Greatful (2016) | Tomorrow Could Be... (2018) | Tomorrow Could Be the Day Things Change (2018) |

Professional ratings
Review scores
| Source | Rating |
|---|---|
| Exclaim! | 7/10 |

Tomorrow Could Be... is an EP by Canadian rapper Classified released on June 29, 2018 on Halflife Records. It is the prequel to his album Tomorrow Could Be the Day Things Change.

== Background ==
After the release of his last project Greatful, Classified had mentioned in an interview with CBC music that it would be his last album. However, he insisted that he wouldn't retire and continue to make music. In early 2018, Classified released "Powerless", the first single off the EP, in support of Canadian Indigenous Women. The second single "Changes" features Anjulie. The third single "She Ain't Gotta Do Much" was the third and final single release. All six tracks off the EP had music videos shot and released for them.

== Track listing ==
1. "Damn Right" – 3:19
2. "Changes" (featuring Anjulie) – 4:18
3. "She Ain't Gotta Do Much" – 3:38
4. "Powerless" – 4:11
5. "Fallen" – 3:38
6. "Finish It" – 3:34

== Charts ==
| Chart (2018) | Peak position |
|---|---|
| Canadian Albums (Billboard) | 81 |
