= Trial & Error (album) =

Studio album by Classified
- Released: March 1, 2003
- Genre: Hip-hop
- Length: 47:50
- Label: Halflife Records, Urbnet Records
- Producer: Classified

Classified chronology
Union Dues (2001)	Trial & Error (2003)	Boy-Cott-In The Industry (2005)

Trial & Error is the ninth album by Canadian rapper and record producer Classified. It was released on March 1, 2003 with 14 tracks.

Professional ratings
Review scores
Source	Rating
RapReviews	(6/10)

== Track listing ==
1. "Intro" – 1:03
2. "Gossip" – 3:48
3. "Heavy Artillery" – 3:51
4. "On tha Brink" – 2:18
5. "Unexpected" – 3:48
6. "Just the Way It Is" (ft. Eternia, DL Incognito & Maestro Fresh Wes) – 4:13
7. "Got Luv" – 3:16
8. "Interlude" – 0:13
9. "Trial & Error" – 3:39
10. "It's Sickening" (ft. Mic Boyd) – 3:32
11. "This Is For" – 3:30
12. "Confused Confrontations" – 3:04
13. "Three Beats & A MC" – 3:12
14. "Like It's Criminal" (ft. Bonshah, J-Bru & Spesh K) – 8:23

== Singles ==
1. "Gossip/This Is For" (2003)
2. "Heavy Artillery" (2003)
3. "Unexpected" (2003)
