= Hitch Hikin' Music =

Studio album by Classified
- Released: September 19, 2006
- Genre: Hip-hop
- Length: 65:03
- Label: Halflife Records, Urbnet Records
- Producer: Classified

Classified chronology
Boy-Cott-In the Industry (2005)	Hitch Hikin' Music (2006)	While You Were Sleeping (2007)

Hitch Hikin' Music is the eleventh album by Classified, released in September 2006. "Find Out", "Feeling Fine (Remix)", "All About U" and most recently, "Hard to Be Hip-Hop" were released as singles. Also notable is that Jordan Croucher's (featured on the show Much 911) single "Feeling Fine" (Remix) is included on the album. "Fall from Paradise" was the latest single from the album.

Professional ratings
Review scores
Source	Rating
ChartAttack	4/5 stars
Exclaim!	(positive)
Now	3/5 Ns
RapReviews	(8/10)

== Track listing ==
1. "Intro (Here We Go)" – 2:08--- Additional Vocals : Busta Rhymes
2. "Find Out" – 4:07
3. "Put It All in Perspective" – 4:02
4. "Hard to Be Hip Hop" (Ft. Maestro Fresh Wes) – 3:28
5. "Beatin' It" – 3:51
6. "Feelin Fine (Remix)" (Ft. JRDN & Jay-Bizzy) – 3:53
7. "Freezin' in the Cold" – 4:32
8. "Hip Hop Star" – 3:29
9. "All About U" (Ft. Chad Hatcher) – 4:32
10. "Beat Auction II" – 3:23
11. "Cheap Talk" – 3:31
12. "Cazual Drinking" (Ft. Tash From Tha Liks) – 3:42
13. "Fall From Paradise" – 4:14
14. "Live It Up" (Featuring Mic Boyd) - 4:00
15. "See the Truth" - 3:51
16. "Believe It or Not" (Ft. Jay-Bizzy, J-Bru, White Mic, & Preacher K) - 4:13
17. "Never Turns Out How You Thought It Would" - 4:07

== Singles ==
1. "Feelin Fine (Remix)" (Featuring Jordan Croucher & Jay-Bizzy) (2006)
2. "Find Out" (2006)
3. "All About U" (2007)
4. "Hard to Be Hip Hop" (2007)
5. "Fall From Paradise" (2007)
