= Elmsdale, Nova Scotia =

Community in Nova Scotia, Canada

Elmsdale
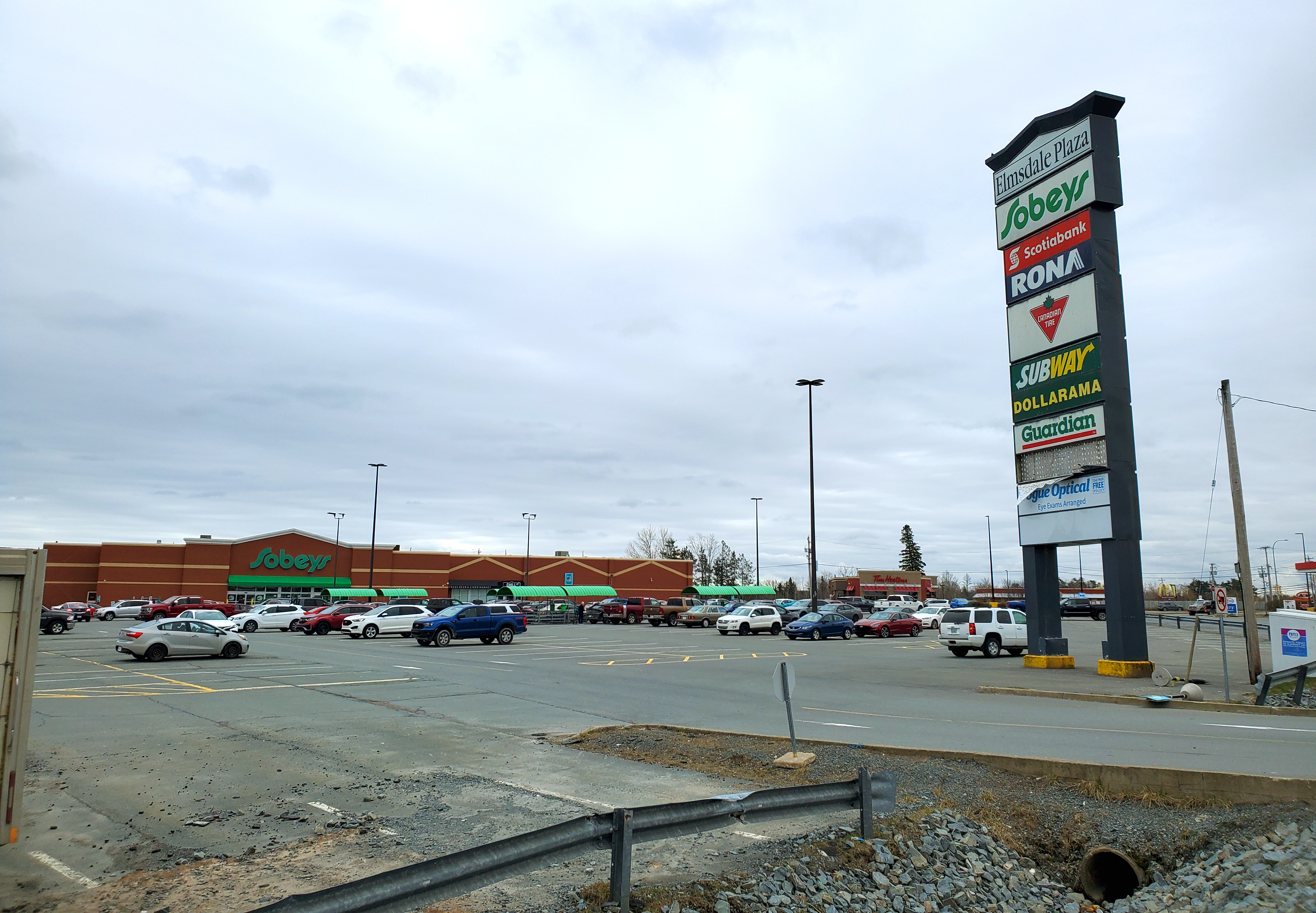
- Elmsdale Plaza

- Location within Nova Scotia
- Coordinates: 44°58′3″N 63°30′16″W
- Country: Canada
- Province: Nova Scotia
- Municipality: East Hants Municipality
- District: 2

Government
  - Type: Regional Council
  - Governing body: Municipal Council of East Hants

Area
  - Land: 2.99 km^{2} (1.15 sq mi)

Population (2021)
  - Total: 413
  - Density: 138.1/km^{2} (358/sq mi)
- Time zone: UTC-4 (AST)
  - Summer (DST): UTC-3 (ADT)
- Postal code: B2S
- Area code: 902
- GNBC Code: CALGE

Elmsdale is an unincorporated community in the Canadian province of Nova Scotia, located on the boundary of the East Hants Municipality and Halifax Regional Municipality.

== History ==
Elmsdale received its name from the number of elm trees growing in the Intervale. It was first settled by a man named Tremoine, and later by Frasers and McDonalds from Pictou County. Prior to 1818, the area was settled by John Archibald, who named his farm "Elmsdale Farm" in reference to the abundance of elm trees.

Elmsdale owes its early growth to the construction of the Shubenacadie Canal and the Nova Scotia Railway. Demand for workers on these projects brought many new families into the area. One of the earliest was William Read who was granted 200 acres (0.81 km^{2}) of land in 1785 at the confluence of the Nine Mile River and the Shubenacadie River.

In 1852, Alexander Fraser built the first house in what is now in the village proper, about 100 yards (91 m) from the railway crossing. In the next six years more houses were constructed near the crossing, including a hotel and a boarding house for railway workers.

The Elmsdale Presbyterian Church was erected in 1860. Its pastor, Rev. John Cameron and family came from Nine Mile River to live in the large residence he had built on the crest of a gentle slope overlooking the village. This house is still in existence and is currently The Briarwood Bed and Breakfast.

== Geography ==
Elmsdale is centrally located in the province, between Truro and Halifax. The community is divided by the Shubenacadie River from the Halifax Regional Municipality.

== Recreation ==
The East Hants Aquatic Centre is a swimming pool and recreation centre located in Elmsdale. The aquatic centre features six 25-metre swimming lanes, a waterslide, diving boards, a 20-person hot tub, a climbing wall, a lazy river, splash pads, and an outdoor splash park.

== Demographics ==
In the 2021 Census of Population conducted by Statistics Canada, Elmsdale had a population of 413 living in 167 of its 179 total private dwellings, a change of 14.7% from its 2016 population of 360. With a land area of 2.99 km^{2} (1.15 sq mi), it had a population density of 138.1/km^{2} (357.7/sq mi) in 2021.

== Notable people ==
- Hanson Dowell (1906–2000), president of the Canadian Amateur Hockey Association and member of the Nova Scotia House of Assembly
