= Roxbury, Nova Scotia =

Roxbury
- Ghost town
- Location within Nova Scotia
- Country: Canada
- Province: Nova Scotia
- Established: Mid-1800s (approximate)

Population
  - Total: 0

Roxbury is a small ghost town outside of Paradise, Nova Scotia.

== History ==
Legend has it that about sixty of the Acadian settlers took flight up the river and hid on the South Mountain to escape the Expulsion. Their allies, the Mi’kmaq, raced on canoe from Grand-Pré, Nova Scotia to warn them what was coming in 1755.

== Lost Acadian Gold ==
Rumours persist that the fleeing Acadians left stashes of gold under Mile Rock on Roxbury Road.

== Development ==
The Acadians had expanded the Mi’kmaq toe-path into a lane, and the Loyalists made it a road off of what is now Route 201. By the mid-1800s, it had a population of about 70, with a school, a church and homes. A mill exported lumber to the railway station in Paradise. In the late 1800s, Roxbury was a logging community with a population of several dozen, but the community ended after the face of the South Mountain was destroyed by a forest fire in 1903 and the community's source of income was lost.

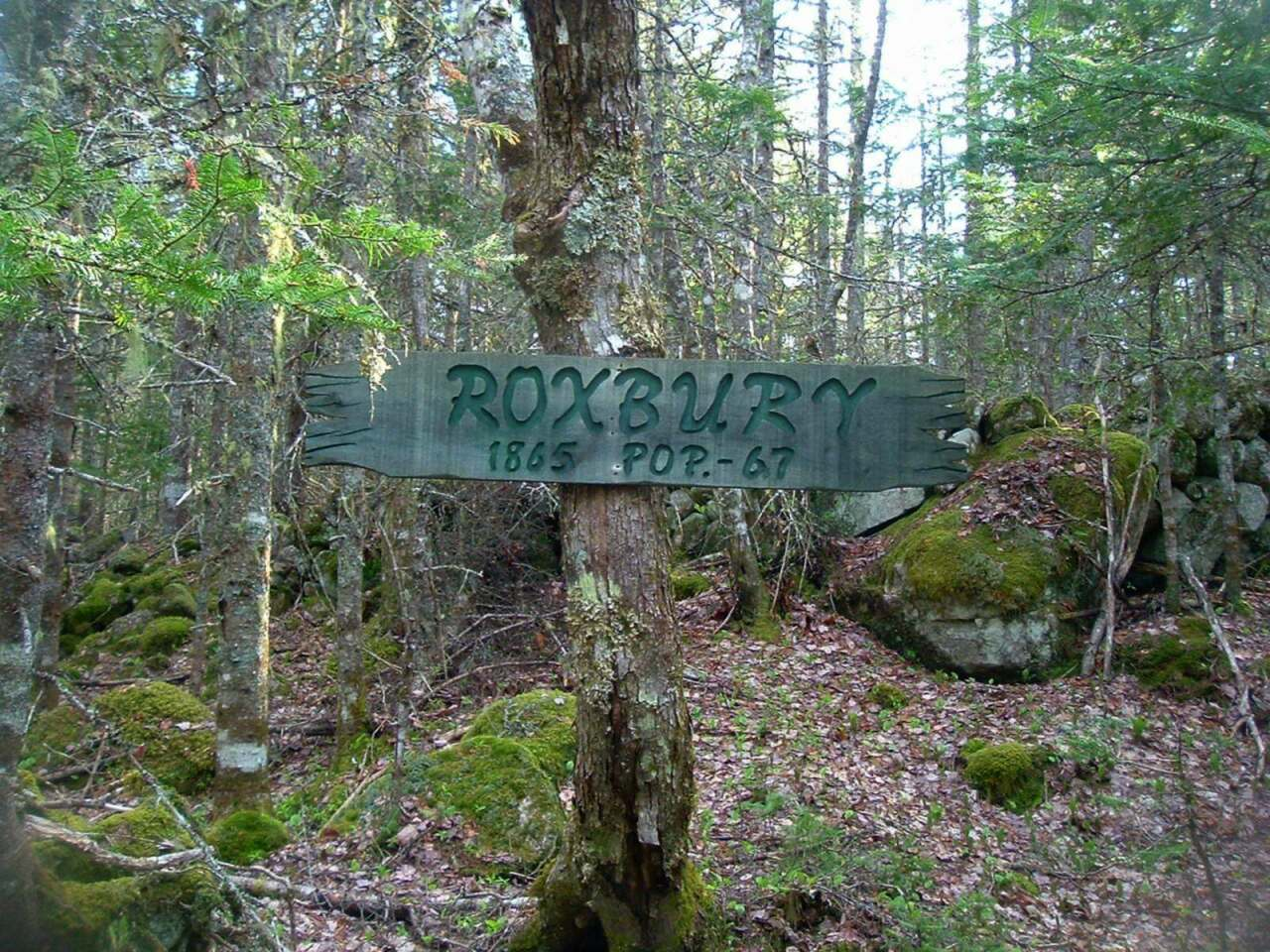
Roxbury sign ca. 2006, part of stone wall in background

== Cemetery ==
- Roxbury Cemetery
- Hinds Family Cemetery
