= While You Were Sleeping (album) =

Compilation album by Classified
- Released: November 6, 2007
- Genre: Hip-hop
- Label: Halflife Records

Classified chronology
Hitch Hikin' Music (2006)	While You Were Sleeping (2007)	Self Explanatory (2009)

While You Were Sleeping is a compilation album by Canadian rapper Classified. It contains both previous and unreleased tracks, including demo tracks, singles, as well as new material.

Professional ratings
Review scores
Source	Rating
HipHopDX	(favourable)
Music-Critic	3.5/5 stars
Sound Advice	5/5 stars

== Track listing ==
1. "This Is For" – 3:21
2. "Love the One You're With" (Ft. Mic Boyd, Mike Boyd Sr.) – 3:47
3. "Hold Your Own" – 3:17
4. "Fall From Paradise" – 4:14
5. "Unpredictable" – 3:48
6. "Flash Backs" – 2:59
7. "Ain't Hard to Find" (Ft. Jordan Croucher & Mic Boyd) – 3:46
8. "Life's a Bitch" – 2:45
9. "The Maritimes" – 3:03
10. "It Ain't Over" – 3:03
11. "It's Sickenin'" (Ft. Mic Boyd) – 3:33
12. "Now Whut" - 3:09
13. "Can't Stop" (Ft. Chino XL & Quake) - 4:13
14. "Politics" - 3:06
15. "Addicted" - 3:40
16. "Beatin' It" - 3:59
17. "Heavy Artillery" - 3:32
18. "Shit Can Be Shit" - 3:05
19. "Past Out" - 2:56
20. "My Life" - 2:44
21. "Talking Shit" - 2:56
22. "Hard to Be Hip Hop" (Ft. Maestro Fresh Wes)" - 3:15
