= Boy-Cott-In the Industry =

Boy-Cott-In The Industry

Studio album by Classified
- Released: March 8, 2005
- Genre: Hip-hop
- Length: 60:47
- Labels: HalfLife, Urbnet Records
- Producer: Classified

Classified chronology
| Trial & Error (2003) | Boy-Cott-In The Industry (2005) | Hitch Hikin' Music (2006) |

Boy-Cott-In the Industry is the tenth album by Classified, released in 2005. The album reached #46 on Soundscan's Canadian R&B/Hip-Hop albums chart. It contains the singles, "5th Element", "The Maritimes", "No Mistakes", and "Unexplainable Hunger". "5th Element", "The Maritimes", and "No Mistakes" were in Much Music's and MTV Canada's Top 20 hits. "No Mistakes" is Classified's most notable song as it won the MMVA for MuchVibe Best Rap Video.

Professional ratings
Review scores
| Source | Rating |
|---|---|
| ChartAttack | 3/5 stars |
| Montreal Mirror | (7.5/10) |
| PopMatters | (6/10) |
| RapReviews | (8/10) |

== Track listing ==
| # | Title | Samples | Length |
|---|---|---|---|
| 1 | "Soundcheck" | | 1:39 |
| 2 | "It's Just My Opinion" | | 3:44 |
| 3 | "Listen" | | 3:35 |
| 4 | "No Mistakes" | | 3:39 |
| 5 | "Problemz" (feat. Jay Bizzy, J-Bru, Spesh-K, & Mic Boyd) | | 3:50 |
| 6 | "High School Behaviour" | | 2:57 |
| 7 | "5th Element" | "High Fidelity" by Jurassic 5 | 3:47 |
| 8 | "Beat Auction Interlude" | | 2:02 |
| 9 | "Separate The Music From The Gimmicks" | "Abbesses" by Birdy Nam Nam | 3:48 |
| 10 | "The Maritimes" | | 3:02 |
| 11 | "Unexplainable Hunger" (feat. Royce Da 5'9" & Choclair) | | 4:23 |
| 12 | "Do This Our Way" | | 3:45 |
| 13 | "F.A.D.S" | | 3:38 |
| 14 | "The Final Time" | | 3:56 |
| 15 | "Still Hip-Hop Interlude" | | 1:25 |
| 16 | "Sibling Rivalry" (feat. Mic Boyd) | | 3:27 |
| 17 | "What's Real" | | 3:35 |
| 18 | "Unexplainable Hunger (Remix)" (feat. Royce Da 5'9" & Kid Vishis) | | 4:35 |

== Singles ==
1. "5th Element" (2005)
2. "The Maritimes" (2005)
3. "No Mistakes" (2006)
4. "Unexplainable Hunger" (2006)
