= Tomorrow Could Be the Day Things Change =

2018 album by Classified

Studio album by Classified
- Released: October 12, 2018
- Genre: Hip hop
- Labels: Halflife, Universal Music Canada
- Producer: Classified

Classified chronology
Tomorrow Could Be... (2018)	Tomorrow Could Be the Day Things Change (2018)	Time (2020)

Tomorrow Could Be the Day Things Change is the fifth major release by Canadian rapper Classified released on October 12, 2018 on Halflife Records and distributed by Universal Music Canada. It also serves as his sixteenth album overall containing 13 tracks (six of which were in the prequel EP Tomorrow Could Be...).

== Background ==
Classified's EP Tomorrow Could Be... served as the prequel to the album which contained six songs from the album's tracklist. A few months after the release, Classified announced the album in September along with its release date. The first single released off the album "Cold Love" features Tory Lanez. In an interview with The London Free Press, Classified spoke on the album by saying, "I always feel like whatever album I’ve just put out is my best album, but with this one I definitely feel like I’ve hit the spot".

A music video for "Legal Marijuana" was released on October 17, 2018 to mark legalization of recreational cannabis in Canada. The video features him rapping about marijuana and includes an additional line where he mentions Edison Cannabis Company, which is owned by East Coast company OrganiGram. It doesn't appear on the album version of the song.

"Super Nova Scotian," which features an all-star group of performers from the Halifax area, came together over two nights at Classified's home studio in Enfield, Nova Scotia. Among the performers, the song features "Trailer Park Boys" actor Mike Smith, who plays Bubbles, and Tyrone Parsons, who performs under the pseudonym Knucklehead and plays J-Roc's manager T on the series. Before starring on the show, Parsons rapped alongside Classified in the late 1990s Halifax act Ground Squad.

== Track listing ==
1. "Don't Stop" – 2:24
2. "Damn Right" – 3:19
3. "Changes" (featuring Anjulie) – 4:18
4. "10 Years" – 3:41
5. "Legal Marijuana" – 3:27
6. "Accept It" – 4:00
7. "Fallen" – 3:38
8. "She Ain't Gotta Do Much" – 3:38
9. "Cold Love" (featuring Tory Lanez) – 3:29
10. "Beastie Boy" – 3:23
11. "Powerless" – 4:11
12. "Super Nova Scotian" (featuring Pat Stay, Skratch Bastid, JRDN, Quake Matthews, Knucklehead & Bubbles) – 4:11
13. "Finish It" – 3:34

== Charts ==
Chart (2018)	Peak position
Canadian Albums (Billboard)	74
