= Milford (Halifax), Nova Scotia =

Community in Nova Scotia, Canada

Milford
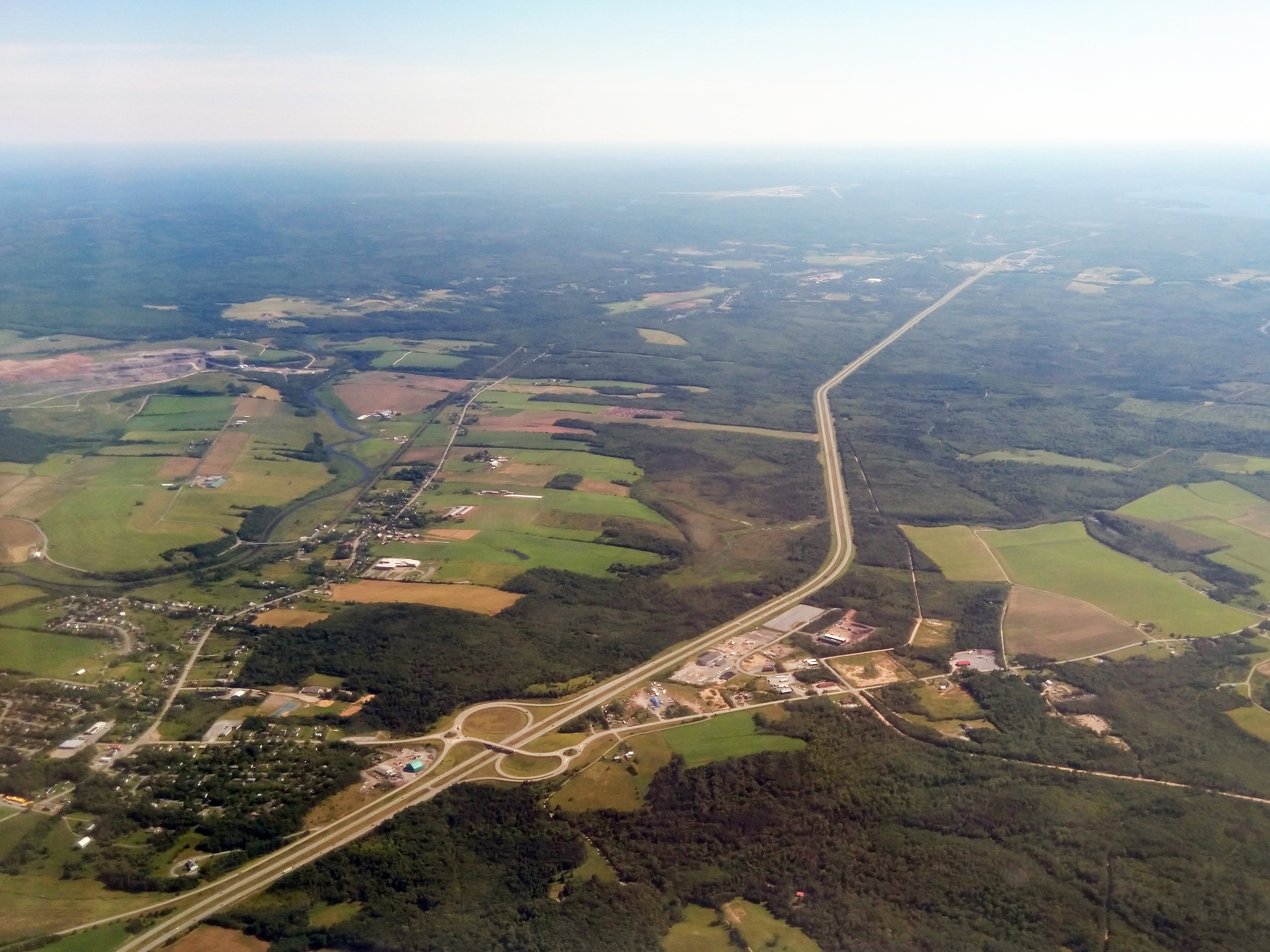
- Aerial shot of Milford at exit 9

- Location in Nova Scotia
- Coordinates: 45°1′33.53″N 63°26′3.74″W
- Country: Canada
- Province: Nova Scotia
- Municipality: Halifax Regional Municipality; East Hants Municipality
- Time zone: UTC-4 (AST)
  - Summer (DST): UTC-3 (ADT)
- Canadian Postal code: B0N
- Area code: 902
- Telephone Exchange: 883
- NTS Map: 011E03
- GNBC Code: CBVIF

Milford is an unincorporated community in the Canadian province of Nova Scotia, located in both East Hants Municipality and Halifax Regional Municipality in Hants County. The community is situated in the Shubenacadie Valley and includes the locality of Milford Station. Milford is the location of Hants East Rural High School and Riverside Education Centre, the primary high school and middle school respectively for the surrounding communities.

== History ==
Among the earliest settlers in the area was Hibbert Newton, who received a land grant in 1765.

Milford was originally named "Wickwires" after its early settlers, however John Wardrope suggested the new name in 1860 because of the presence of various mills in the vicinity. In 1857 the Nova Scotia Railway mainline from Richmond to Truro opened, passing through the community along the west bank of the Shubenacadie River, leading to the creation of the Milford Station locality within Milford.

Milford is primarily a service centre for local farming communities, although given its location along Highway 102, it has a growing residential population and is exhibiting exurban characteristics.
