= Handshakes and Middle Fingers =

Studio album by Classified
- Released: March 22, 2011 (Canada/U.S.)
- Genre: Hip-hop
- Length: 57:11
- Label: Halflife Records/Sony Records

Classified chronology
Self Explanatory (2009)	Handshakes and Middle Fingers (2011)	Classified (2013)

Handshakes and Middle Fingers is the second major release studio album by Canadian rapper Classified released on March 22, 2011 on Sony Music Canada, his thirteenth studio album overall. The first single "That Ain't Classy" reached number 45 on the Canadian Hot 100. A video has been made for the intro to the album and it is called "Ups & Downs". On March 22, the day of its release, it hit number 2 on the iTunes top seller list. The second single is "The Day Doesn't Die" which peaked at number 83 on the Canadian Hot 100. The third single is "Maybe It's Just Me". The album debuted at #7 on the Canadian Albums Chart. In 2018, it was certified Gold by Music Canada.

== Critical reception ==
Professional ratings
Review scores
Source	Rating
AllMusic	3.5/5 stars
HipHopDX	3.5/5 stars
Inrevu	(8/10)
RapReviews	(9/10)
The Smoking Section	3.5/5 stars

Handshakes and Middle Fingers received positive reviews from music critics. Pedro 'DJ Complejo' Hernandez of RapReviews praised the production and lyrics for evolving beyond his previous two albums, saying that, "Classified does nothing obvious or purposeful that screams out "growth," but the album plays out in a way that reflects a newfound mindset." Jon O'Brien of AllMusic commented on the various genre-hopping that Classified did on the production, saying that it falls shy from the works of Kanye West and B.o.B, but concluded that it "doesn't take away from the inventiveness and refreshingly candid lyrics that permeate a record which is definitely more worthy of a handshake than a middle finger." Amanda Bassa of HipHopDX said that, "Handshakes and Middle Fingers proves to be an overall solid effort, with varying production styles that keep it refreshing from start to finish, and the kind of honesty expressed through confidently delivered lyricism that would be very difficult not to respect."

== Track listing ==
- All tracks produced by Classified.

No.	Title	Length
1.	"Intro: Ups and Downs" (music 'Night Pas de Deux' from The Ecstasy of Rita Joe written by Ann Mortifee)	3:08
2.	"That Ain't Classy"	3:59
3.	"High Maintenance"	3:47
4.	"Unusual" (featuring Joe Budden)	4:13
5.	"Danger Bay"	3:36
6.	"Stay Cool"	3:58
7.	"Passion"	3:57
8.	"Maybe It's Just Me" (featuring Brother Ali)	3:46
9.	"Young Soul"	3:42
10.	"Run With Me"	4:00
11.	"The Day Doesn't Die"	4:02
12.	"They Don't Know" (featuring Mic Boyd and White Mic)	3:25
13.	"Step It Up"	3:45
14.	"Desensitized"	4:15
15.	"The Hangover" (featuring Jim Cuddy and Kayo)	3:38

== Charts ==
Chart (2011)	Peak position
Canadian Albums Chart	7
