= Self Explanatory (Classified album) =

Studio album by Classified
- Released: April 7, 2009 (Canada/U.S.)
- Genre: Hip-hop, Rap
- Length: 73:48
- Label: Halflife Records/Sony Records

Classified chronology
While You Were Sleeping (2007)	Self Explanatory (2009)	Handshakes and Middle Fingers (2011)

Self Explanatory is a 2009 album by Canadian rapper Classified (his twelfth album overall). The album received positive reviews from music critics. The first single "Anybody Listening", as of April 18, 2009, has spent 7 weeks on the Canadian Hot 100, peaking at #52. The third single "Oh...Canada" was also active on the charts, peaking at #14 on the Canadian Hot 100, went platinum in digital downloads and was the entrance music for Patrick Côté in UFC 113. In December 2017, the album was certified Gold in Canada.

Professional ratings
Review scores
Source	Rating
AroundinSound	7.8/10
ChartAttack	4/5 stars
Driven	(8/10)
NOW	5/5 stars
RapReviews	(8/10)

== Track listing ==
- All tracks produced by Classified.

No.	Title	Length
1.	"Self Explanatory"	3:05
2.	"Get Out the Way"	3:23
3.	"Choose Your Own Adventure 1"	3:09
4.	"Up All Night"	4:12
5.	"Quit While You're Ahead" (featuring Choclair, Maestro Fresh Wes and Moka Only)	4:34
6.	"Inspiration"	2:08
7.	"Choose Your Own Adventure 2"	2:56
8.	"Anybody Listening"	3:34
9.	"They Call This (Hip Hop)" (featuring Royce da 5'9" and B.o.B)	4:15
10.	"Oh... Canada"	3:22
11.	"Choose Your Own Adventure 3"	4:05
12.	"Where Are You"	3:23
13.	"Trouble"	3:40
14.	"Used to Be" (featuring Mike Boyd)	2:56
15.	"Breaking Up"	4:11
16.	"One Track Mind" (featuring Joel Plaskett)	3:34
17.	"Choose Your Own Adventure 4" (featuring Martin Finch and Ghetto Child)	2:34
18.	"Things Are Looking Up" (featuring Chad Hatcher)	3:54
19.	"Still Got It"	3:22
20.	"Loonie" (featuring D-Sisive, Shad K, DL Incognito and Buck 65)	3:36
21.	"Choose Your Own Adventure 5"	2:43
22.	"Choose Your Own Adventure 6"	1:12

iTunes bonus track
No.	Title	Length
23.	"Some People"	3:33

== Singles ==
1. "Trouble" (2008),
2. "Anybody Listening" (2009), #52
3. "Up All Night" (2009)
4. "Oh...Canada" (2009), #14
5. "Quit While You're Ahead" (2009)
6. "They Call This (Hip Hop)" (2010)

== Chart positions ==
Chart (2009)	Peak position
Canadian Albums Chart	25
