= Hants East Rural High School =

Canadian high school

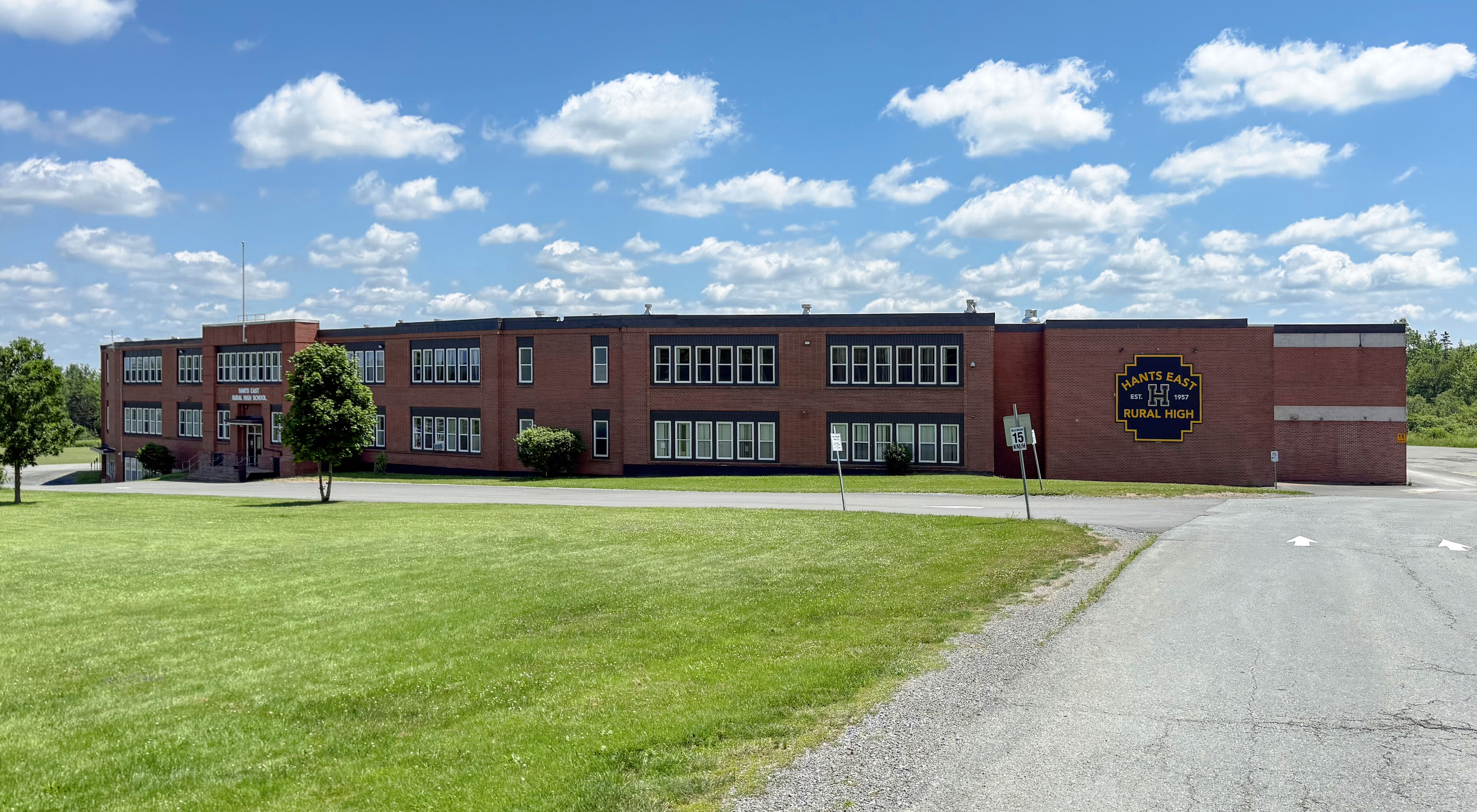
- HERH in 2025

Location
- 2331 Highway 2 Milford, Nova Scotia; Canada; 45°3′20.47″N 63°25′43.67″W

Information
- Type: Senior High School
- Motto: Labor Omnia Vincit (Hard Work Conquers All)
- Established: 1957
- Principal: Leanne Searle
- Grades: 9–12
- Enrollment: 1,000
- Colors: Black and Gold
- Mascot: Tiger
- Website: herh.ccrce.ca

Hants East Rural High (HERH) is a Canadian high school located in Milford, Nova Scotia. Built in 1957, the school was officially opened on 13 June 1958. An extension comprising new classrooms and labs opened in 1968.

HERH is administratively part of the Chignecto-Central Regional School Board. One of its feeder schools is Riverside Education Centre, also in Milford.

== History ==
Hants East Rural High was built in 1957 by Acadia Construction Limited, a company based out of Bridgewater. The building was designed by the architect Douglas A. Webber, and comprises brick-faced thermocrete blocks over a steel frame. The school began operating in September of that year, with Robert Clark as its first principal; it was officially opened on 13 June 1958 by Malcolm S. Leonard, the minister of education. Upon opening, HERH had 406 students across 15 classes, taught by 21 teachers. By 1965, the school saw a significant increase in enrolment—to accommodate the number of students, construction on an addition began in the fall of 1967. The new wing of the school opened in February 1968, consisting of four commercial labs and new classrooms. By the 1968–1969 school year, the school had 791 students, 32 classes, and 45 teachers. HERH enrolled a total of 360 First Nations students between 1968 and 1975, but graduated only three of them.

Parents began to raise concerns about the condition of the school in 1990. In February of that year, a petition with 1,200 signatures was presented to the Colchester-East Hants Regional School Board (Note: Later Chignecto-Central Regional School Board) requesting an investigation into the school's cleanliness and maintenance, causes and duration of suspensions, and lack of communication between school administration and parents. The superintendent of the school board said their concerns would be studied in a three-part review over two months.

In 2016, a group of parents created a petition demanding a replacement for the aging school. A spokesperson from the Chignecto-Central Regional School Board stated that "we've got some other schools that have some larger issues that need to be dealt with before Hants East," noting that HERH is "on the list. It's just not at the top of the list." The building underwent CA$800,000 in repairs between 2007 and 2016 to meet regulatory requirements.

HERH has faced criticism for its handling of incidents involving Indigenous students. In a 2017 incident following a physical altercation with a First Nations student, the school invited all Indigenous students to the library to discuss the altercation, a decision that was described by a parent as "singling [them] out". Some Indigenous students at the school reported being subjected to racial slurs following the incident. Indigenous students at HERH have reported experiencing discrimination and unfair disciplinary practices at the school. The education minister Zach Churchill referred to the school's suspension rates and concerns from Indigenous students as "very concerning", and announced that the Mi'kmaw service branch of the Education Department was investigating.
