= Shubenacadie Grand Lake =

Large lake in Nova Scotia, Canada

- Location within Nova Scotia
- Location: Enfield Nova Scotia
- Coordinates: 44°55′5.7″N 63°35′40″W
- Type: Lake
- Primary inflows: Fletcher's Lake
- Primary outflows: Shubenacadie River
- Basin countries: Canada
- Surface area: 1,841.3 ha (4,550 acres)
- Max. depth: 45 m (148 ft)
- Surface elevation: 13 m (43 ft)
- Islands: 3
- Settlements: Wellington, Oakfield, Enfield, Halifax Regional Municipality, Hants County

Shubenacadie Grand Lake is a large lake in the Canadian province of Nova Scotia, located in both East Hants Municipality and Halifax Regional Municipality. It drains into the Shubenacadie River at its northeastern outlet and is the seventh and largest lake in the Shubenacadie Canal system.

Shubenacadie Grand Lake hosts two provincial parks, Laurie Provincial Park and Oakfield Provincial Park, both on its eastern shore.

Shubenacadie Grand Lake has been under blue-green algae advisories during recent warm seasons due to harmful algal blooms. Deaths among dogs in Atlantic Canada have been associated with their consumption of cyanobacteria toxin-contaminated water. An increasing frequency of algal blooms may be attributable to the effects of climate change.
