= Shubenacadie River =

River in Nova Scotia, Canada

Coordinates: 45°18′15.6″N 63°28′39.8″W

Shubenacadie
- Map of the Shubenacadie / Stewiacke River drainage basin

Location
- Country: Canada
- Province: Nova Scotia

Physical characteristics
- Source
  - location: Shubenacadie Grand Lake
  - elevation: 13 m (43 ft)
- Mouth
  - location: Cobequid Bay
  - elevation: 0 m (0 ft)
- Length: 72 km (45 mi)
- Basin size: 1,304 km^{2} (503 sq mi)(together with Stewiacke River).

Basin features
- Progression: Cobequid Bay—Minas Basin—Bay of Fundy

The Shubenacadie River (/ˌʃuːbəˈnækədi/) is a river in Nova Scotia, Canada. It has a meander length of approximately 72 km from its source at Shubenacadie Grand Lake to its mouth at the community of Maitland on the Cobequid Bay. The lower 30 km of the river (from the point where the Stewiacke River meets to the mouth) is tidal and the river experiences a tidal bore twice daily, with some bores reaching up to 3 m in height at certain points along the river. Local tourism operators offer adventure seekers a chance to ride with the bore on high-horse power Zodiac Hurricanes. Tidal Bore Rafting was invented at the Tidal Bore Rafting Resort by H. Knoll. It is also a popular surfing spot for experienced sea kayakers.

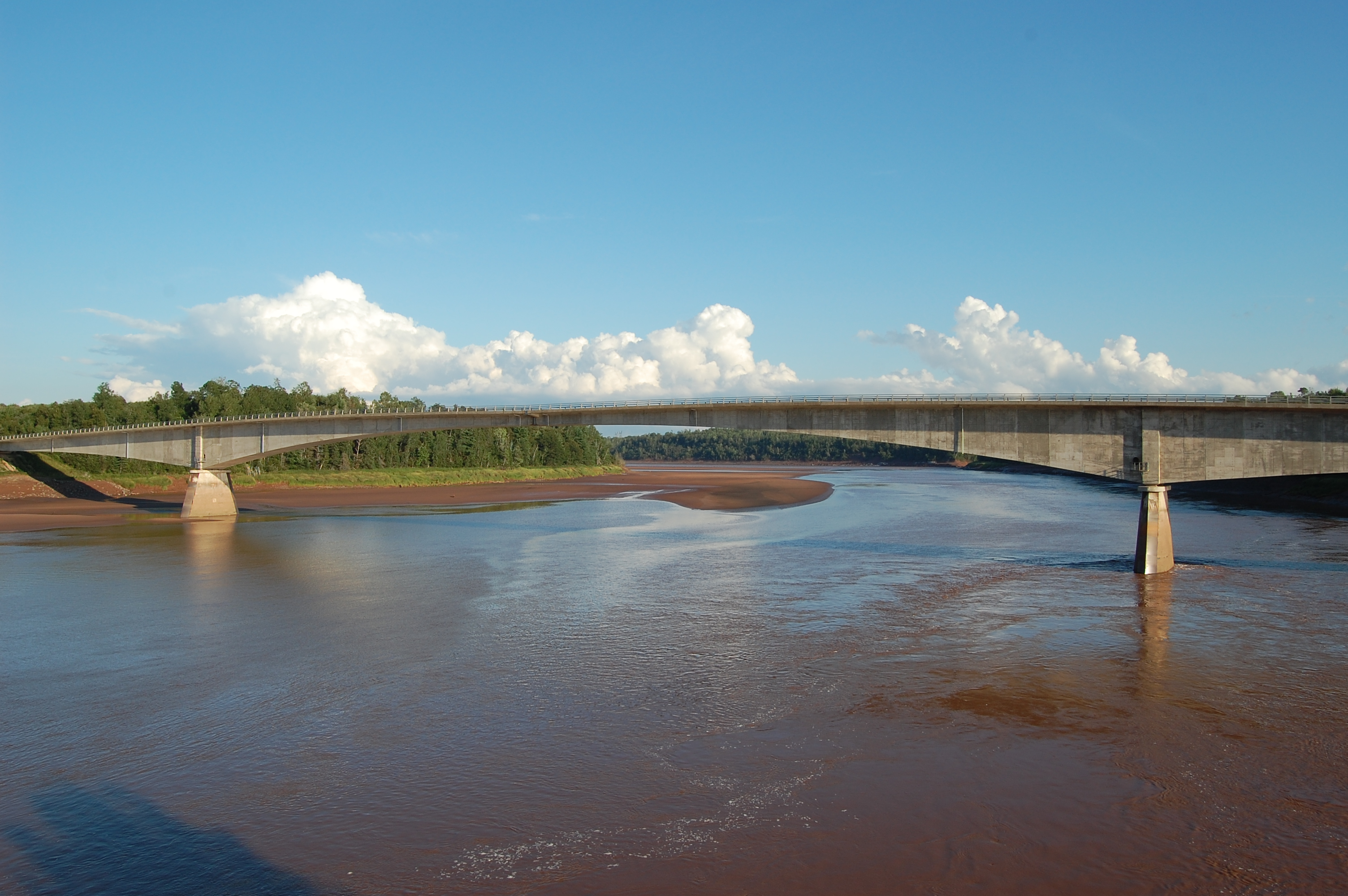
Bridge over the Shubenacadie River at South Maitland.

The river flows through part of northern Halifax County, forming the boundary with Hants County before forming the boundary between Hants and Colchester County.

The Shubenacadie Valley hosts a diversified agricultural economy and is also experiencing suburban sprawl, given its location in the Halifax-Truro transportation corridor.

The river is also extremely popular among anglers who mainly target striped bass.

Bald eagles roost in the trees along the river's banks and can be seen from the river throughout the year.

== Alton Gas project ==
In January 2016, the Government of Nova Scotia announced industrial approvals for natural gas storage caverns to be constructed by Alton Natural Gas in salt deposits near the banks of the Shubenacadie River. The project intended to flush brine into the river twice per day. Documents obtained via the Freedom of Information Act from the company dating back to 2014 showed plans to produce brine with salinity levels 6 times greater than is considered safe for the area's fish.

The project was met with intense opposition by the Sipekne'katik First Nation and environmentalists due to concerns surrounding the river's fish being affected by the planned brine flushing. The First Nation sought an appeal of the project's approval via the Nova Scotia Supreme Court, citing lack of consultation with the band, going against their Aboriginal title claims to the land.

In 2022, a plan was announced by the company for the decommissioning of the project by the end of the same year. The company cited mixed support for the project and delays as the reason for ceasing its operations at the site.

== See also ==
- Shubenacadie Canal
- List of rivers of Nova Scotia
