= Moka Only discography =

Discography of Canadian rapper, singer, and record producer, Moka Only

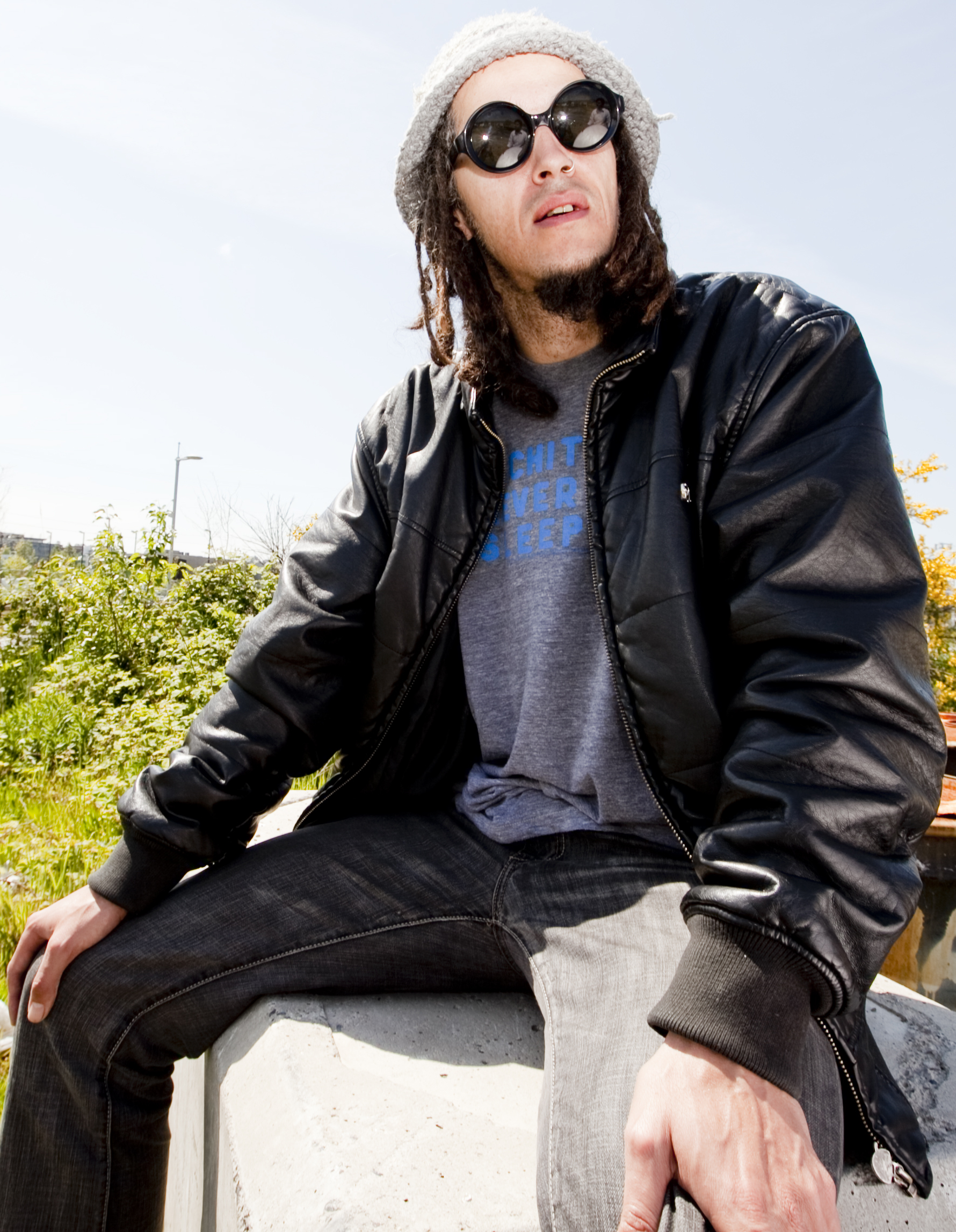
- Moka Only in 2010
- Studio albums: 81
- Collaborative albums: 32
- Instrumental albums: 4
- Extended plays: 19

Canadian rapper, singer, and record producer Moka Only, also known under the stage names Ron Contour, Flowtorch and Torch, has released 81 studio albums, 31 collaborative albums, 4 instrumental albums, and 18 extended plays. 6 of his studio albums were also released separately as instrumental albums. Additionally, he has produced 10 albums and 2 extended plays for other musicians.

Along with his solo career, he has also been a member of many groups including Code Name: Scorpion with Abstract Rude and Prevail, The Deli with Baptiste Hayden, Dominant Mammals with Kirby Dominant, Golden Section with Birdapres and K-Rec, JMB's with Jon Rogers and Mr. Brady, Mr. Mista with Mr. Brady, The Nope with Psy, Nowfolk with Ishkan, Perfect Strangers with Madchild, The Rappers with Jeff Spec, Spacesuits with Jules Chaz, LMNO, and Mr. Brady, Split Sphere with Prevail, The Summasound Clinic with Nebz Supreme, Swollen Members with Madchild and Prevail, Tank Gawd with KutMasta Kurt, and Zzbra with Evil Ebenezer and The Draft Dodgers.

== Albums ==
=== Studio albums ===
Title	Release date	Label	Format	Notes
Upcoast Relix	June 15, 1995	Rapstar Records (self-released)	Cassette, CD, digital download, streaming	CD release: 2001, Legendary Entertainment
Dusty Bumps	February 18, 1996	Rapstar Records (self-released)	Cassette, CD, digital download, streaming	CD release: 2001, Legendary Entertainment
Durable Mammal	July 15, 1997	Rapstar Records (self-released)	Cassette, CD, digital download, streaming	CD release: 2001, Legendary Entertainment
Fall Collection '97	October 21, 1997	Rapstar Records (self-released)	Cassette, CD, digital download, streaming	CD release: 2001, Legendary Entertainment
Monsterpiece	June 15, 1998	Rapstar Records (self-released)	Cassette, CD, digital download, streaming	CD release: 2001, Legendary Entertainment
Everyday Details	January 1, 2000	Legendary Entertainment	CD, digital download, streaming	
Beauty is a Free Road	June 15, 2000	Mammal Music (self-released)	Cassette, CD, digital download, streaming	CD release: 2001, Legendary Entertainment
Road Life	August 15, 2000	Perilunar	CD, digital download, streaming	Credited as Moka Only and Flowtorch
Mokefluenza	February 13, 2001	Legendary Entertainment	CD, digital download, streaming	
Lime Green	April 3, 2001	Battle Axe Records	CD, LP	
The Quick Hits	July 15, 2001	Legendary Entertainment	CD, digital download, streaming	
Moka Only is… Ron Contour	September 4, 2001	Underworld Inc.	CD, LP	Credited as Ron Contour and Moka Only
Flood	September 17, 2002	Underworld Inc.	CD, LP, digital download, streaming	
Lowdown Suite	June 3, 2003	Battle Axe Records	CD, LP, digital download, streaming	
The Desired Effect	August 16, 2005	Battle Axe Records / Nettwerk	CD	
Dirty Jazz	October 22, 2005	Octave	CD	Japan exclusive CD
Desired Effect	September 29, 2006	Green Streets Entertainment	CD, digital download, streaming	
The Station Agent	October 24, 2006	Camobear Records	CD, digital download, streaming	Credited as Moka Only and Torch
Martian Xmas 2004	January 9, 2007	Legendary Entertainment	CD, digital download, streaming	
Airport	April 22, 2007	Legendary Entertainment	CD, digital download, streaming	Credited as Moka Only and Torch; Reissued: June 28, 2007
Vermilion	April 24, 2007	Urbnet Records	Cassette, CD, digital download, streaming	Credited as Moka Only and Torch; Cassette release: 2018
Martian Xmas 2006	December 11, 2007	Legendary Entertainment	CD, digital download, streaming	
Martian Xmas 2007	December 11, 2007	Legendary Entertainment	CD, digital download, streaming	
Fall Collection 2005	January 8, 2008	Legendary Entertainment	CD, digital download, streaming	
Airport 2	April 1, 2008	Legendary Entertainment	CD, digital download, streaming	Credited as Moka Only and Torch
Hotdog	June 17, 2008	Legendary Entertainment	CD, digital download, streaming	Credited as Ron Contour
Clap Trap	July 29, 2008	Urbnet Records	Cassette, CD, digital download, streaming	Cassette release: 2018
Carrots and Eggs	October 28, 2008	Urbnet Records	Cassette, CD, digital download, streaming	Cassette release: 2018
Martian Xmas 2008	December 9, 2008	Legendary Entertainment	CD, digital download, streaming	Reissued: 2009
Airport 3	April 21, 2009	Legendary Entertainment	CD, digital download, streaming	
Lowdown Suite 2… The Box	May 19, 2009	Feelin' Music	CD, digital download	
The Beach	September 8, 2009	Legendary Entertainment	CD, digital download, streaming	Credited as Ron Contour
The Summer of Ron	October 7, 2009	Domination Recordings	CD, digital download	Credited as Ron Contour
Martian XMAS 2009	December 15, 2009	Domination Recordings	CD, digital download	
Rontario	April 6, 2010	Legendary Entertainment	CD, digital download, streaming	Credited as Ron Contour
Airport 4	July 13, 2010	Legendary Entertainment	CD, digital download, streaming	
Martian Xmas 2010	December 7, 2010	Legendary Entertainment	CD, digital download, streaming	
Airport 5	April 14, 2011	Legendary Entertainment / Wandering Worx	CD, digital download, streaming	
Longmile Buggedness	November 22, 2011	Legendary Entertainment	CD, digital download, streaming	Credited as Ron Contour
Martian Xmas 2011	December 22, 2011	Feelin' Music	Digital download	
Airport 6	September 18, 2012	Urbnet Records	CD, LP, digital download, streaming	
Martian Xmas 2012	December 11, 2012	Urbnet Records	CD, digital download, streaming	
Doctor Do Much	July 30, 2013	Urbnet Records	Cassette, digital download, streaming	
Mutant	November 7, 2013	none (self-released)	Cassette, digital download	
Martian Xmas 2013	December 10, 2013	Urbnet Records	CD, digital download, streaming	
Sex Money Moka	May 13, 2014	Urbnet Records	CD, digital download, streaming	
Martian Xmas 2014	December 2, 2014	Urbnet Records	CD, digital download, streaming	
California Sessions Vol. One	April 3, 2015	Beautiful Records	Digital download, streaming	
Chicken Wingz	May 8, 2015	Self Serve Records	Digital download	
Magickal Weirdness	July 19, 2015	Urbnet Records / Beautiful Records	Cassette, CD, digital download, streaming	
Martian Xmas 2005	December 11, 2015	Urbnet Records	Digital download, streaming	
Martian Xmas 2015	December 11, 2015	Urbnet Records	Digital download, streaming	
California Sessions Vol. 2	December 25, 2015	Solidarity Records	Digital download, streaming	
Brutal	January 22, 2016	Urbnet Records	Cassette, digital download, streaming	
São Paulo	March 25, 2016	Urbnet Records	Cassette, digital download, streaming	
Re-Bent Twisted and Gnarled	April 29, 2016	Urbnet Records	Cassette, digital download, streaming	
Malkin Jackson: Summerland	June 25, 2016	Urbnet Records	Cassette, digital download, streaming	
#99	July 29, 2016	Urbnet Records	Cassette, digital download, streaming	
California Sessions Vol. 3	August 26, 2016	Urbnet Records	Cassette, digital download, streaming	
Milky State	September 30, 2016	Urbnet Records	Cassette, digital download, streaming	
Martian Xmas 2016	November 29, 2016	Urbnet Records	Cassette, digital download, streaming	
To the Next Season	December 25, 2016	Urbnet Records	Cassette, digital download, streaming	
Concert for One	September 1, 2017 Instrumentals: June 29, 2018	Urbnet Records	Cassette, CD, LP, digital download, streaming	
Martian Xmas 2017	December 15, 2017	Urbnet Records	CD, digital download, streaming	
Myopic Bubble	October 3, 2018 Instrumentals: April 25, 2025	Dead Wrestlers Music	Cassette, CD, digital download, streaming	Reissue: April 11, 2025, Urbnet Records
Martian Xmas 2018	December 14, 2018	Urbnet Records	CD, digital download, streaming	
Patina	April 26, 2019 Instrumentals: September 13, 2019	Urbnet Records	Cassette, CD, LP, digital download, streaming	
Martian 2019	December 20, 2019	Urbnet Records	CD, digital download, streaming	
It Can Do	May 8, 2020 Instrumentals: November 20, 2020	Urbnet Records	Cassette, CD, LP, digital download, streaming	
She ran away to Mexico to join the circus	November 13, 2020	Urbnet Records	Digital download, streaming	
Martian 2020	December 18, 2020	Urbnet Records	CD, digital download, streaming	
Martian XMAS 2021	December 10, 2021	Urbnet Records	CD, digital download, streaming	
Summer 2002, Vol. 1	August 5, 2022	Urbnet Records	Cassette, CD, digital download, streaming	
Summer 2002, Vol. 2	August 26, 2022	Urbnet Records	Cassette, CD, digital download, streaming	
Martian XMAS 2022	December 9, 2022	Urbnet Records	Cassette, CD, digital download, streaming	
In and of Itself	May 19, 2023 Instrumentals: September 15, 2023	Urbnet Records	Cassette, CD, LP, digital download, streaming	Cover artwork: Moka Only
Martian XMAS 2023	December 15, 2023	Urbnet Records	Cassette, CD, digital download, streaming	
Arbutus Canyon	November 15, 2024 Instrumentals: February 28, 2025	Urbnet Records	Cassette, CD, LP, digital download, streaming	
Martian XMAS 2024	December 6, 2024	Urbnet Records	Cassette, CD, digital download, streaming	
Martian XMAS 2025	December 12, 2025	Urbnet Records	Cassette, CD, digital download, streaming	
Many Pies	May 29, 2026	Urbnet Records	Cassette, CD, LP, digital download, streaming	

=== Collaborative albums ===
Title	Artist	Release date	Label	Format	Notes
Apenuts	Deceo Ellipsis	June 16, 1998	Rapstar Records (self-released)	Cassette, CD, digital download, streaming	CD release: 2001, Legendary Entertainment
Mount Unpleasant	Deceo Ellipsis	May 1, 1999	Rapstar Records (self-released)	Cassette, CD, digital download, streaming	CD release: 2001, Legendary Entertainment
Mr. Behavior	Deceo Ellipsis	June 15, 1999	Rapstar Records (self-released)	Cassette, CD, digital download, streaming	CD release: 2001, Legendary Entertainment
Style Gangstas	Ishkan (as Nowfolk)	August 15, 1999	Mammal Music (self-released)	Cassette, CD, digital download, streaming	CD reissue: 2001, Legendary Entertainment
Dominant Mammals	Kirby Dominant	April 25, 2000	Legendary Entertainment	CD, digital download, streaming	Reissue: Super Future Stars, 2002, Rapitalism Records
Flowtorch	Deceo Ellipsis	October 24, 2000	Legendary Entertainment	CD, digital download, streaming	
Rappin' Atchu	Jeff Spec (as The Rappers)	January 15, 2001	Legendary Entertainment	CD, digital download, streaming	
Code Name: Scorpion	Abstract Rude and Prevail	August 7, 2001	Battle Axe Records	CD, LP, digital download, streaming	
The Moon	Ishkan (as Nowfolk)	2002	Perilunar	Cassette, CD, digital download, streaming	Digital/streaming release: 2024
Monsters in the Closet (Note: He is credited as a member of Swollen Members for Monsters in the Closet, but only appears on 6 of 20 songs.)	Swollen Members	November 12, 2002	Battle Axe Records	CD, LP, digital download, streaming	
Heavy	Swollen Members	November 18, 2003	Battle Axe Records	CD, LP, digital download, streaming	
Moka Only vs. Atsushi Numata	Atsushi Numata	March 16, 2007	P-Vine Records	CD	Japan exclusive CD
Dog River	Def3	September 25, 2007	Ship Records	CD, digital download, streaming	
Psychodelic	Tre	September 1, 2008	Threat-House Records	Digital download, streaming	Credited as Torch and Moka Only
Melba	Psy (as The Nope)	December 8, 2009	Domination Recordings	CD, digital download	
Saffron	Factor Chandelier	March 23, 2010	Fake Four Inc.	CD, digital download, streaming	Credited as Ron Contour
Dynamite Sandwich	Jimmy the Bang	September 27, 2010	none (self-released)	Digital download, streaming	Credited as Ron Contour; Reissue: June 23, 2024 as Moka Only and pnwrk
Crickets	Chief	November 8, 2011	Feelin' Music	CD, LP, digital download, streaming	Switzerland exclusive CD/LP
Zzbra: Original Motion Picture Soundtrack	Evil Ebenezer and The Draft Dodgers	January 31, 2012	Camobear Records	CD, digital download, streaming	
Bridges	Ayatollah	April 10, 2012	Green Streets Entertainment	CD, LP, digital download, streaming	Credited as Moka Only and Ron Contour
Spacesuits	Mr. Brady, LMNO and Jules Chaz	October 14, 2014	Urbnet Records	CD, LP, digital download, streaming	
Magnesium Opium	Ishkan (as Nowfolk)	February 19, 2016	Urbnet Records	Cassette, CD, digital download, streaming	
The Winter. From 2001	Ishkan (as Nowfolk)	October 28, 2016	Urbnet Records	Cassette, CD, digital download, streaming	
Microphone Deflection	KutMasta Kurt (as Tank Gawd)	December 18, 2020	Volunteer Media	Cassette, CD, LP, digital download, streaming	
Midnight Sessions	The SOULution	October 11, 2022	Uglypitch Records	Digital download, streaming	
The Deli	Baptiste Hayden	February 22, 2024	Wandering Worx	Cassette, digital download, streaming	
Archeology	Soulful Playground	May 22, 2024	Circle Drive Creative	CD	
2008-2021 Vaults Vol. 1	Mr. Brady (as Mr. Mista)	September 24, 2024	DIY Records	Digital download, streaming	
AMALAMA	Alcynoos and Parental	October 25, 2024	HHV Records	LP, digital download, streaming	Cover artwork: Moka Only
More Vibes & B-Sides	Reckognize Real	January 24, 2025	Real Deff Music Group	CD, LP, digital download, streaming	
Welcome to the Agrodome	Birdapres and K-Rec (as Golden Section)	July 24, 2026	Urbnet Records	CD, digital download, streaming	

=== Instrumental albums ===
Title	Release date	Label	Format	Notes
Barbecued Horse Contest	August 26, 2011	Wandering Worx	Digital download	
vintage beats 2002 vol. 1	October 8, 2013	none (self-released)	Digital download	
I'm Delighted	May 27, 2016	Urbnet Records	Cassette, digital download, streaming	
Spooky Beats n' Other Treats	October 13, 2023	Urbnet Records	CD, digital download, streaming	Cover artwork: Moka Only

== Extended plays ==
=== Solo EPs ===
Title	Release date	Label	Format
The Creepee Eepee	January 9, 2007	Legendary Entertainment	CD, digital download, streaming
Creepee Eepee 2	January 8, 2008	none (self-released)	CD, digital download, streaming
Do Work	May 12, 2009	Feelin' Music	Digital download
Isn't Over	May 14, 2010	Feelin' Music	Digital download

=== Collaborative EPs ===
Title	Artist	Release date	Label	Format	Notes
The Crystal Senate	Sixtoo	1997	Hand'Solo Records	EP	
Perfect Strangers	Madchild	2001	Battle Axe Records	EP	
Run & Find	DJ Y-Not?	March 31, 2009	Domination Records	Digital download	
Rain All Day / Wedonappreciatit	Psy (as The Nope)	April 7, 2009	Domination Recordings	Digital download	
Crickets Remixes Part 1	Chief	November 25, 2011	Feelin' Music	Digital download, streaming	
Crickets Remixes Part 2	Chief	December 20, 2011	Feelin' Music	Digital download, streaming	
The Bug Out	Mr. Brady (as Mr. Mista)	September 28, 2012	DIY Records	Digital download, streaming	
Sinus	Psy (as The Nope)	January 21, 2014	none (self-released)	Digital download	
Unreleased Arkdale Sessions 1998	DJ Moves	March 11, 2014	none (self-released)	Digital download	
Vibes	Reckognize Real	September 22, 2017	Real Deff Music Group	Cassette, CD, EP, digital download, streaming	
JMB's Vol. 1	Jon Rogers and Mr. Brady (as The JMB’s)	October 20, 2019	HiWave Records	Digital download, streaming	
The Mothership	Switch	February 2, 2022	Urbnet Records	CD, digital download, streaming	Cover artwork: Moka Only
Inference and Hearsay	Checkmate and K-Rec	July 26, 2024	Urbnet Records	Cassette, CD, digital download, streaming	
Beaming	Rad Brown	September 26, 2025	Urbnet Records	CD, digital download, streaming	Credited as Moka Only and Ron Contour
Witness the Splitness	Prevail (as Split Sphere)	September 29, 2026	Split Sphere	Digital download, streaming	

== Singles ==
=== As lead artist ===
Title	Album	Release date	Label	Format
"Live From Rio"	Mokefluenza	1999	Four Ways to Rock	12"
"Imagine Me"	Lime Green	2000	Battle Axe Records	12"
"Been There"	Lime Green	2000	Battle Axe Records	12"
"Smokin' In Here"	Code Name: Scorpion	2001	Battle Axe Records	12"
"I'll Be Cool"	-	2002	Battle Axe Records	12"
"Fresh & Dope"	Super Future Stars (with Dominant Mammals)	2003	Rapitalism Records	7"
"Watch This"	Heavy (with Swollen Members)	2003	Battle Axe Records	12"
"Once Again" (ft. Madchild)	The Desired Effect	2005	Battle Axe Records	Digital download
"Flaunt"	The Summer of Ron (as Ron Contour)	2009	Domination Recordings	Digital download
"Like That"	Airport 6	September 18, 2012	Urbnet Records	7"
"No"	Magickal Weirdness	March 24, 2015	Urbnet Records	Digital download, streaming
"Food Truck"	Bassments of Badmen 3 (compilation)	September 16, 2016	Hand'solo Records	Digital download, streaming
"Funky Like"	Patina	March 8, 2019	Urbnet Records	Digital download, streaming
"Handclap Shadack"	It Can Do	April 3, 2020	Urbnet Records	Digital download, streaming
"Do It Again"	It Can Do	April 17, 2020	Urbnet Records	Digital download, streaming
"Word Up" (Instrumental)	It Can Do	September 18, 2020	Urbnet Records	Digital download, streaming
"I Am" (Instrumental)	It Can Do	October 9, 2020	Urbnet Records	Digital download, streaming
"That's How" (Instrumental)	It Can Do	October 30, 2020	Urbnet Records	Digital download, streaming
"We’re Rhymin"	Microphone Deflection (with Tank Gawd)	January 15, 2021	Volunteer Media	7"
"Wood Panelled"	Martian XMAS 2021	December 3, 2021	Urbnet Records	Digital download, streaming
"Shivers 2"	-	December 7, 2021	Re: Define Records	Digital download, streaming
"Fallin…" (Instrumental)	Martian XMAS 2021	December 8, 2021	Urbnet Records	Digital download, streaming
"One Time"	Desired Effect	December 11, 2021	FlipNJay Records	7"
"More Soup" (ft. MF Doom)	Desired Effect	December 11, 2021	FlipNJay Records	7"
"Happily Disturbed" (Instrumental)	-	February 11, 2022	Urbnet Records	Digital download, streaming
"Super Normal Regular"	Archeology (with Soulful Playground)	May 27, 2022	Circle Drive Creative	Digital download, streaming
"You’re Invited"	Archeology (with Soulful Playground)	July 15, 2022	Circle Drive Creative	Digital download, streaming
"For You" (Instrumental)	-	July 22, 2022	Urbnet Records	Digital download, streaming
"My Grind"	Archeology (with Soulful Playground)	July 29, 2022	Circle Drive Creative	Digital download, streaming
"Get Gone"	The Deli (with Baptiste Hayden)	August 4, 2022	Wandering Worx	Digital download, streaming
"Forget the Flowers"	Archeology (with Soulful Playground)	August 26, 2022	Circle Drive Creative	Digital download, streaming
"Takin' Off" (ft. Kapok)	-	September 28, 2022	Wandering Worx	Digital download, streaming
"Good Indeed"	Martian XMAS 2022	December 9, 2022	Urbnet Records	Digital download, streaming
"Naturally"	In and of Itself	April 7, 2023	Urbnet Records	Digital download, streaming
"Tablecloth"	In and of Itself	April 28, 2023	Urbnet Records	Digital download, streaming
"Open Concept"	The Deli (with Baptiste Hayden)	May 25, 2023	Wandering Worx	Digital download, streaming
"I Fell In Love At White Castle"	Archeology (with Soulful Playground)	November 3, 2023	Circle Drive Creative	Digital download, streaming
"Blurs"	Martian XMAS 2023	December 1, 2023	Urbnet Records	Digital download, streaming
"Stuck"	More Vibes & B-Sides (with Reckognize Real)	December 27, 2024	Real Deff Music Group	Digital download, streaming
"Wanna Say 2u"	More Vibes & B-Sides (with Reckognize Real)	January 17, 2025	Real Deff Music Group	Digital download, streaming
"MAYBELLINE (IS THIS FEELING FOR REAL?"	More Vibes & B-Sides (with Reckognize Real)	February 14, 2025	Real Deff Music Group	Digital download, streaming
"Do U A Solid" (Instrumental)	Arbutus Canyon	February 14, 2025	Urbnet Records	Digital download, streaming
"Welcome Us Back"	Witness the Splitness (with Split Sphere)	April 20, 2026	Split Sphere	Digital download, streaming
"Reactivated"	Witness the Splitness (with Split Sphere)	May 17, 2026	Split Sphere	Digital download, streaming
"Bonafide Badlands"	Witness the Splitness (with Split Sphere)	June 15, 2026	Split Sphere	Digital download, streaming
"Pero and Emmo"	Witness the Splitness (with Split Sphere)	July 10, 2026	Split Sphere	Digital download, streaming
"Unga Bunga"	Witness the Splitness (with Split Sphere)	August 7, 2026	Split Sphere	Digital download, streaming
"Witness the Splitness"	Witness the Splitness (with Split Sphere)	September 4, 2026	Split Sphere	Digital download, streaming
(with Split Sphere) "Capital" (ft. Casual)	-	October 2, 2026	Hiero Imperium	Digital download, streaming
(with Split Sphere) "Timeslots"	-	October 30, 2026	Split Sphere	Digital download, streaming

=== As featured artist ===
Title	Artist	Album	Release date	Label	Format
"Fuel Injected"	Swollen Members	Bad Dreams	2002	Battle Axe Records	12", 7"
"Bring It Home"	Swollen Members	Bad Dreams	2002	Battle Axe Records	12"
"There She Go"	Sunspot Jonz	Don’t Let Em Stop You	2003	Battle Axe Records	12"
"Where's My Honey"	Lester	Wicked!	2003	Nettwerk	12"
"Flyable"	Shingo Suzuki	The Abstract Truth	2008	Origami Productions	Japan exclusive 12"
"My Mission"	DJ Motive	CURE	2008	Mohawk Records	Japan exclusive 12"
"Red Dragon"	Swollen Members	Armed to the Teeth	September 8, 2009	Battle Axe Records / Suburban Noize	Digital download, streaming
"Fly B.S."	Jeff Spec	Fall Collection 2014	2010	none	Digital download
"Do What U Do"	Doodlebug	Digable Planets Presents Futuristic Sci-Fi	July 26, 2011	Soulspazm Records	Digital download, streaming
"Traffic in the Night"	Jus Frais	-	May 29, 2012	none	Digital download, streaming
"Return of the Backpacker"	Bored Stiff	-	June 9, 2012	Bored Stiff	Digital download, streaming
"One, Two"	Def3	-	January 9, 2013	none	Digital download
"Dragon's Gate"	Def3	-	April 19, 2013	none	Digital download
"1st Place"	The Pharcyde	-	July 16, 2013	none	Digital download
"Change"	Frank Friction	Bird Talk	August 13, 2013	Money Maker Records	Digital download
"Cherry On Top"	Dan-e-o	Immortal	September 10, 2013	Urbnet Records	Digital download, streaming
"Snooki"	Ursa Maja	World War Me	September 26, 2013	Ursa Maja	Digital download, streaming
"Go To Work" (ft. D-Sisive)	Nic Bambrough	I Never Left, I'm Just On Tour - EP	September 16, 2014	Nic Bam	Digital download, streaming
"Change of the Guard"	Lord Diamonds	-	November 20, 2014	Volunteer Media	Digital download, streaming
"Explosives" (ft. Illa J)	Potatohead People	Big Luxury	December 8, 2014	Bastard Jazz Recordings	Digital download, streaming
"Brush Me Off"	Ugly As Sin	-	August 23, 2015	Ugly As Sin	Digital download, streaming
"Love Is All"	Laprada and Akompliss	-	January 20, 2016	Laprada and Akompliss	Digital download, streaming
"Koolin"	Robbie G	-	July 24, 2016	Robert Gruenbauer	Digital download, streaming
"It Don't Matter"	Hazardous	-	August 20, 2016	Hazardous	Digital download, streaming
"Do It Like Hip Hop"	Rennie Foster	-	October 10, 2016	MSLX Recordings	7", digital download, streaming
"All Me"	Mike Sherm	Back Around	May 1, 2017	FLVR Records	Digital download, streaming
"League of Legends" (ft. Thrust, Maestro Fresh Wes, Big Kish and Eternia)	Dan-e-o	Dear Hip Hop: 20 Years Later	September 15, 2017	Urbnet Records	Digital download, streaming
"Breathe Easy"	Merchaholic	-	November 30, 2017	Merchaholic	Digital download, streaming
"Poppin' My Shit"	Sikadime	The Wooden Spiral Staircase in a Glass House	February 23, 2018	From West Till Three	Digital download, streaming
"Desire"	Luv Randhawa	Believe In Me	May 3, 2018	Luv Music Online	Digital download, streaming
"Hurt People Hurt People"	The Doublecross	-	April 20, 2018	Jonathan Greenwood	Digital download, streaming
"Small World" (ft. Del the Funky Homosapien and The Gaff)	Def3	Small World	January 4, 2019	Urbnet Records	Digital download, streaming
"Promise"	Jinx TK	-	May 31, 2019	FLVR Records	Digital download, streaming
"Getting By"	Rel McCoy	A Different Crown	July 19, 2019	Illect Recordings	Digital download, streaming
"Hey"	Crazy Cstyle	-	August 13, 2019	none	Digital download, streaming
"B.C.M.C."	LiftedPro	Lifted2020	August 16, 2019	Lifted Productions	Digital download, streaming
"Chilly Chill"	Reflectionz	-	October 10, 2019	Ref Records	Digital download, streaming
"Ricky Chip$ With Yung Je$$e"	Ev Thompson	-	November 1, 2019	Aud Man Out Entertainment	Digital download, streaming
"Deep"	Swaed	Late Night Drives With Good Music	December 7, 2019	Swaed	Digital download, streaming
"Bax Naval Brigade" (ft. Ruckus)	Goon	-	December 13, 2019	Goon	Digital download, streaming
"Trail Bars Cypher"	Merchaholic	-	December 21, 2019	none	Digital download, streaming
"Love Makes Pt. 1" (ft. Chaplyn)	K-Rec	-	May 15, 2020	Casual Dad Records	Digital download, streaming
"Easy Street"	Christopher eSX	-	July 1, 2020	VIP Records	Digital download, streaming
"Midnight" (ft. Fiend)	Mehdi Medz	-	July 21, 2020	none	Digital download, streaming
"Old Love" (ft. Fiend)	Mehdi Medz	-	August 6, 2020	none	Digital download, streaming
"Breathe Easy" (ft. Brainiac)	Oz	-	August 12, 2020	RUZE Records	Digital download, streaming
"Wait"	Crystal T.A.	-	November 27, 2020	Esskeh Music	Digital download, streaming
"All Through the Night"	XL the Band	-	November 27, 2020	Dream Killer	Digital download, streaming
"Light Bright"	Mr. Brady and Budamunk	Tainted Scrolls of Mr Buda	December 22, 2020	King Tone	Digital download, streaming
"Right Now"	416Solo	-	February 19, 2021	Critical Music Group	Digital download, streaming
"Bad Dreams"	blakfyrebeats and SUPER FREDDY	-	February 26, 2021	Ice Coast Entertainment	Digital download, streaming
"Still Hustling"	Checkmate and DJ Kemo	-	February 26, 2021	Natural Game Records	Digital download, streaming
"Salute" (ft. Ishkan)	Reflectionz	-	March 26, 2021	none	Digital download, streaming
"Quarantine Lean"	Kurt Scott	-	April 16, 2021	Dead Wrestlers Music	Digital download, streaming
"All Your Heart"	Tae	-	June 6, 2021	Tae Music and Art	Digital download, streaming
"digipet 1" (feat. Oz)	O P Yeti	-	June 30, 2021	RUZE Records	Digital download, streaming
"Turning"	Gary Juicy	-	September 21, 2021	none	Digital download, streaming
"Takin' it Back" (ft. Joaquin Daniels)	Ev Thompson	Est. 95 - EP	October 15, 2021	Aud Man Out Entertainment	Digital download, streaming
"Summer Challenge" (ft. DJ Kemo)	Pazo Guerra	Immortalidad Digital	October 15, 2021	Warsound Music	Digital download, streaming
"Count Dracula" (ft. Katie Bates and Tejai Moore)	Kamileon	-	November 19, 2021	Jeremy A. Bryan	Digital download, streaming
"Phases"	Monrabeatz	-	December 3, 2021	Monrabeatz	Digital download, streaming
"Savage Wolves"	Team Omega and Shortop	Alpha Strike	December 13, 2021	War Records / Goodspin Records	Digital download, streaming
"Instructions"	Akompliss	-	January 9, 2022	Sound Alive Records	Digital download, streaming
"Crosswind"	Sacx One and Musgo One	The Secret Chamber	April 22, 2022	Kraken Distribución	Digital download, streaming
"The Vitamin"	Orgin of Spin	-	June 3, 2022	Black Whole Records	Digital download, streaming
"Passenger"	Switch	Bolts - EP	June 24, 2022	Revel Distro	Digital download, streaming
"Free [Remix]" (ft. Prevail)	OurGlassZoo and KutMasta Kurt	-	August 26, 2022	Volunteer Media	Digital download, streaming
"Love What We Do"	Sacx One and DJ Franbass	Never Give Up	October 28, 2022	Kraken Distribución	Digital download, streaming
"Lighten Up"	RELIGION	-	February 9, 2023	Wandering Worx	Digital download, streaming
"3AM"	Troy Dunnit	-	March 15, 2023	none	Digital download, streaming
"Slice of Life"	Taktikz	-	March 31, 2023	TaktikzHiphop	Digital download, streaming
"Daydreamers"	Bubz	-	June 10, 2023	Rodina Records	Digital download, streaming
"Starlings Green"	Remulak	-	July 13, 2023	Village Live Records	Digital download, streaming
"The Road"	Ali the Great	-	July 28, 2023	ALI the GREAT	Digital download, streaming
"Still Paying Dues"	Konfidential and Mlny	-	July 28, 2023	Konfidential Music	Digital download, streaming
"The Grand Gusto" (ft. Thrust OG)	Navi the North	-	July 30, 2023	Northstar Records	Digital download, streaming
"Sophisticated"	Soulization	-	October 19, 2023	Stereofox	Digital download, streaming
"Heart at Home"	Factor Chandelier	-	November 17, 2023	Side Road Records	Digital download, streaming
"Nice To Know"	Soulization	-	November 27, 2023	Stereofox	Digital download, streaming
"Night Rider"	Fidelity Beats	-	December 28, 2023	Fidelity Beats Music	Digital download, streaming
"OpenHope"	lordMixer	-	January 19, 2024	Urban Soul Music	Digital download, streaming
"IHaveEquipment"	lordMixer	-	March 1, 2024	Urban Soul Music	Digital download, streaming
"Love Games" (ft. Illa J and Frank Nitt)	Sye	-	April 3, 2024	S.elect Y.our Entertainment	Digital download, streaming
"One Square At a Time"	Stephen Hero and Uncle Fester	The Squeeze	July 19, 2024	Beats Don’t Lie	Digital download, streaming
"What About Now" (ft. Dingo-D)	K-Rec	-	September 18, 2024	Casual Dad Records	Digital download, streaming
"Prestige" (ft. D-Track)	QUEST	Snd*Trk, Vol. 3	December 13, 2024	Dreamland	Digital download, streaming
"Cali Blend" (ft. Fawshawn and Tranzformer)	Destruct	-	December 20, 2024	Rebel Minded Music	Digital download, streaming
"IWantYou2HaveThis"	lordMixer	-	January 10, 2025	Urban Soul Music	Digital download, streaming
"Ascension" (ft. Kurious)	K-Rec	-	February 25, 2025	Casual Dad Records	Digital download, streaming
"No Time Like the Present"	HarveyDent	Cut The Music	March 23, 2025	Aud Man Out Entertainment	Digital download, streaming
"Nice n Smooth"	Mr. Skip and Gene Fiero	Rebirth of Fresh	April 11, 2025	Knight Lab Recordings	Digital download, streaming
"Late Shift"	K-Rec	-	June 20, 2025	Casual Dad Records	Digital download, streaming
"All My Friends"	Jimmy Burnett	-	August 13, 2025	Lab Rat Mutiny	Digital download, streaming
"We Really Doing This"	Fibz	-	August 15, 2025	Fibz	Digital download, streaming
"Rotary Demisphere"	randra	-	August 15, 2025	Artificial Wave Pool	Digital download, streaming
"Crisp and Clear"	Gary Juicy	-	October 10, 2025	none	Digital download, streaming
"What You Doing Today" (ft. Mike Wird)	Diles	-	October 21, 2025	Visceral View Publishing	Digital download, streaming
"Stay On (K.I.M.)"	Cidtronyck	-	November 28, 2025	Atmosfera Pro	Digital download, streaming
"Frequencies"	Rennie Foster	Embrace for Impact	December 17, 2025	none	Digital download, streaming
"Love Like"	K-Rec	-	December 26, 2025	Casual Dad Records	Digital download, streaming
"UnrelatedStatements"	lordMixer	-	January 9, 2026	Urban Soul Music	Digital download, streaming
"Get ‘Em Up" (ft. Deceo and D-Rec)	Skinny Buff	-	January 21, 2026	Urban Wizdom Music	Digital download, streaming
"Lotsa Thoughts" (ft. iNKS)	Ostubash	-	March 27, 2026	Bash Fiend Recordings	Digital download, streaming
"Sun Don’t Shine"	Di$tinct	-	April 8, 2026	The Block Productions	Digital download, streaming
"Box of Goods"	TED-D	-	April 13, 2026	none	Digital download, streaming
"Me and You"	Blanka	-	June 25, 2026	Nowadays Records	Digital download, streaming
"Magnificent"	Benny Zenn	-	October 1, 2026	none	Digital download, streaming
"Tune In"	SoulSeize	-	October 6, 2026	none	Digital download, streaming

== Guest appearances ==
Title	Artist	Album	Release date	Label
"Wax Job" (ft. J-Ras) and "The Ark"	Various Artists	Cock Dynamiks	1997	Hand'solo Records
"Moketro", "Even Pt. 2" (ft. Electrik O), "Sum Of It All" and "And Some Nowfolk Magic"	Ishkan	Wrecktangular	1997	none
"All I Got"	Isosceles	Face the Music	1998	Ivry Tower Productions
"I Made It I Got It" and "Butterscotch Molasses"	Birdapres	Alumni	1998	none
"Party Motivation"	Ishkan	Bent, Twisted & Gnarled	1999	none
"Cryptik Souls Crew" and "Crazy Cause I Believe (Early Morning Sunshine)"	LEN	You Can't Stop the Bum Rush	May 25, 1999	Work / Sony
"Good Weather Bring", "Transition" and "Big Rap Stars" (ft. Jeff Spec and Kirby Dominant)	Ishkan	Cousin Coolout	May 23, 2000	City Planners Music
"Different" (ft. Madchild)	Living Legends	Angelz Wit Dirty Faces	2000	Outhouse
"Now", "Radiology" and "Break North" (ft. Stace Prints, Incredible Ease and That Bastard Jeff)	Birdapres	Collector's Item	2001	Legendary Entertainment
"End Notes"	Intellect	Thousand Sense	2001	Legendary Entertainment
"Hey! Everybody"	Jeff Spec	Fort Knock	2001	Legendary Entertainment
"Details"	Sichuan	Instrumental Floss	2001	Legendary Entertainment
"Give Away Your Soul"	Chin	Day Dreaming	2001	Change Communications
"Worth The Wait"	Various Artists	A Piece of the Action	2001	Day By Day Entertainment
"Cool Shit"	Various Artists	Styles Upon Styles - Volume Two: More Hip Hop From The Ground On Up	2001	Stonegroove Recordings
"Lonewolf"	Pelding	Pelding	August 17, 2001	Lizard Shakedown Records
"Right There"	Ishkan and Sweet G	The Rapper Writs	October 30, 2001	Legendary Entertainment
"Chameleon Creatures" and "Hang Around"	Gabriel Teodros	Sun To A Recycled Soul (Reissue)	2002	none
"All The Time"	Factor Chandelier	Time Invested	2002	Off Beat Production
"The Look of This"	Jeff Spec	Dark City	2002	Day By Day Entertainment
“Worth Your While”	DJ Murge	Search and Rescue	2002	Battle Axe Records
"September 11th 2001 (Interlude)"	Various Artists	911 Amerika	2002	Pangea / MADK Productions
"The Moon, My Love and Me" (ft. Ishkan)	Various Artists	On Top of the World	2002	Day By Day Entertainment
"Moked Out"	DJ Moves	Hiss 2 (Hysteria)	May 31, 2002	Futility Records
"Seize It"	Soul Merchants	The Merchandice	2003	SMG Productions
"E-merged"	Kinnie Starr	Sun Again	2003	Lakeshore Records
"Get Back"	Various Artists	Longplayers Compilation	2003	Longplay Records
"Daydreaming"	Various Artists	Big Break… Because Obscurity Is A Drag	2003	CBC Radio
“Flawless” (with Swollen Members) and “Crazy”	Various Artists	Battle Axe Warriors III	March 25, 2003	Battle Axe Records
"Put Em Up"	Son Doobie	Funk Superhero	May 20, 2003	Battle Axe Records
"Every Breath"	Aceyalone and Abstract Rude (The A-Team)	Lab Down Under	July 8, 2003	Basement Records
"Perhaps"	Maya Jupiter	Today	August 21, 2003	Artivist Entertainment
“Get Live” (with Swollen Members)	Abstract Rude & Tribe Unique	Showtyme!	August 26, 2003	Battle Axe Records
"Better Days"	Sweatshop Union	Natural Progression	October 7, 2003	Battle Axe Records
"Warriors" (with Swollen Members and DJ Drez)	Fat Jack	Cater to the DJ 2	2004	Battle Axe Records
"We Develop"	Just B	Middle Ground Rational	2004	Eclipse Records
"Here We Go"	Deep Rooted	A New Beginning	2004	Open Myndz Entertainment
"One Day" (with Swollen Members)	Kyprios	Say Something	June 22, 2004	Columbia
"Electrofunkee", "Smoke It", "The Hop", "Airplane Muzik" (ft. Nohow), "Big Up", "Rugged & Ruff" and "Supostah" (ft. The Phonograff)	NWNB	60403	July 1, 2004	none
"Party" (ft. Bishop), “Block Party [Remix]” and “North Star” (with Swollen Members)	Various Artists	Lyrics of Fury III	August 10, 2004	Battle Axe Records
"Oz"	Sunspot Jonz	No Guts No Glory (Part One)	December 21, 2004	Revenge Entertainment
"Hot Water"	Sunspot Jonz	Only the Strong Shall Survive (Part 2)	December 21, 2004	Revenge Entertainment
"Boing" and "Damn Shame"	Ishkan	Murder Mouth	2005	Eclipse Records
"Never Look Back"	Jeff Spec	The Last Shall Be First Vol. One	2005	none
"Same as I Ever Was"	Abyssinian Creole	Sexy Beast	October 25, 2005	MADK Productions
"Higher Algebra"	Dirty Circus	Over Easy	2006	none
"High School Shit"	Birdapres	Get It Done	2006	Peanuts & Corn Records
"Good Combination" (ft. DL Incognito)	RDS	Open Mic	2006	Penny Royal Records
"Let the Animal Out" and "Tricks" (ft. Jim Brown)	Infinite P	Flyin' So High The Mixtape	2006	none
"Exclusive Shit"	Neoteric	Exhibit Eh	2006	Futility Records
"Time After Time"	Planet Asia	The Sickness: Part One	January 31, 2006	Copter Records
"In The Air" and "Home"	Jeff Spec	Rhythm and Blues	August 29, 2006	Avery Records
"Stay Like That", "Crystal Ball", "Northern Lights" and "No Label [Slow Movin' Trains Remix]"	Gabriel Teodros	Westlake: Class of 1999	September 11, 2006	none
"Grind" and "Put Me On"	Swollen Members	Black Magic	September 12, 2006	Battle Axe Records
"Just When"	Sikadime	Rejuvinated	December 19, 2006	From West Till Three
"How Bouts"	BrassMunk	Fewturistic	2007	EMI Music
"Torch"	Waves	Tru Luv 4 Music	2007	Camey Studio
"BBQ (So Good)"	Boz Faramone	Bad Man Skankin	2007	Noizee Bunkarz Entertainment
"Man Alive"	Various Artists	Label Sampler	February 26, 2007	Camobear Records
"Someday Girl"	Fatty Down	Famous Nobody	April 17, 2007	Legendary Entertainment
"Nothing to Prove"	Lenny Diko	Recession Proof	May 1, 2007	UIYB Records
"Too Much"	Josh Martinez	Splitsville: Double EP	June 12, 2007	Camobear Records
"Fukk Around"	Robert Strauss	Mr Feelings	October 1, 2007	BBE
"Something About Me"	DJ Deckstream	Soundtracks	October 3, 2007	Lexington Co.
"Afternooner" (ft. Van Khanh)	Masia One	Pulau: Montreal in the Fall	2008	Merdeka Group
"Natures Flow", "Super Natural" and "Go Fly a Kite"	Blest	World Wide Obsession	February 8, 2008	none
"Human Target"	Erthtonez	No Such Thing As Ghosts	March 1, 2008	SlowDJs
"Yeah"	CRUNK23	Dirty Bling	March 25, 2008	Legendary Entertainment
"Underground Pop" (ft. Skratch Bastid)	Josh Martinez	World Famous Sex Buffet	May 21, 2008	Origami Productions
"Lonely City"	Factor Chandelier	Chandelier	July 8, 2008	Side Road Records
"Summer Time" (ft. Suga-D), "Never Fall in Love" (ft. Deezuz), "Real" (ft. Luckyiam) and "The Minutes"	Fatty Down	Couches and Floors	August 5, 2008	Legendary Entertainment
"Better Off Yesterday", "All Itis" (ft. Suga-D) and "Not Wrong"	Fatty Down	Cafe	August 5, 2008	Legendary Entertainment
"I'm So Beautiful"	Metty the Dertmerchant	Fink Ployd	August 25, 2008	Legendary Entertainment
"Part 1"	Buck 65	Dirtbike 1	September 1, 2008	none
"That's It Y'all" (ft. Sadat X)	Spesh K	The Main Event	September 23, 2008	none
"Shoot Low"	Sweatshop Union	Water Street	October 10, 2008	Look Records
"Paradise"	Dragon Fli Empire	Redefine	October 17, 2008	P-Vine Records
"Things You Do"	Nayles	Eye Still Grow	November 21, 2008	none
"1, 2", "Blak of the Night", "Can't Change Your Opinion", "I Don't Do What You Do" and "Mountains"	Infinite P	Westword Thee Album	December 11, 2008	none
"Sleep Alright" (ft. Ishkan)	Guy Woods	My Dusty Finger Tips	2009	none
"Super Stupid", "So Much", "Be Free", "Got Those" and "Mr Mista Music"	Mr. Brady	Left Overs, Vol. 1	2009	none
"She's Gone"	Kyprios	12:12	2009	none
"My Day"	God Made Me Funky	Welcome to New Funktonia	2009	New Empire
"Git Off It!"	Professional Sinnerz	Amazing	2009	Cobalt Music
"2AM Reflections"	Elaquent	After Midnight	January 4, 2009	Urbnet Records
"Start" and "Peace-Fights"	Sunspot Jonz	Fight-Destroy-Rock	February 4, 2009	Revenge Entertainment
"Quit While You're Ahead" (ft. Maestro Fresh Wes and Choclair)	Classified	Self Explanatory	April 7, 2009	Half Life Records
"Speed Demon"	Def3 and Factor Chandelier	Drumbo	May 29, 2009	Ship Records
"More/Less"	Halabisky’s Uprising	State of Emergency	September 15, 2009	none
"F'real Emcee (Intro)", "Next To Blow", "Float" and “Bust Dough” (ft. Eso Tre)	The Summasound Clinic (with Nebz Supreme)	Summer Notations	September 22, 2009	Domination Recordings
"Anyway" and "Demon Love" (ft. Kissey Asplund)	Chief	Collabo Collection	November 3, 2009	Feelin' Music
"O.C.D." (ft. Birdapres)	Pip Skid	Skid Row	2010	Foultone Records
"Tell Her [Remix]"	The Scale Breakers	Left Overs	2010	none
"Payin' Dues"	Konfidential	Pressed For Time	2010	none
"Feel So Good"	Aileron	Stretch to the Sky	2010	Aileron Enterprises Inc.
"Lucid" (ft. E.D.G.E.)	REL!G!ON	Underground Hip-Hop Volume 5	March 23, 2010	Urbnet Records
"Went Away"	Factor Chandelier	Lawson Graham	May 18, 2010	Side Road Records
"Better Believe [Remix]" and "Another 1"	Tre	High Frequency	June 1, 2010	Threat-House Records
"Hollywood Square" (ft. Frank Nitt)	The Trillionaires (Sweatshop Union)	By Hook or by Crook	June 15, 2010	Urbnet Records
"Like It's Supposed To" (ft. Bootie Brown)	Dirty Circus (Sweatshop Union)	Alive and Well	June 15, 2010	Urbnet Records
"Looptape" (ft. Itchy Ron)	Pigeon Hole (Sweatshop Union)	Age Like Astronauts	June 15, 2010	Urbnet Records
"Connect Like Four"	Rennie Foster	Blood Sugar	June 15, 2010	Rebirth
"West Coast [Remix]"	D-Sisive	Vaudeville	June 22, 2010	Urbnet Records
"Fall In Love"	C4ent	The C4 Experiment hosted by Cristopher Walken	July 1, 2010	Didier Tovel
"F*ck You", "Blak Ov Da Night (Remix)" and "Grabba Hold (IP Cover Song)"	Infinite P	Moonlight	July 1, 2010	none
"Clap", "No Longer", "Like That" and "Slumps"	Mr. Brady	Left Overs, Vol. 2	August 9, 2010	DIY Records
"Runway" and "I'm Out" (as Ron Contour)	Rushden & Diamonds	2010	August 10, 2010	Volunteer Media
"Brere Rabbit" and "On Time" (ft. Def3)	Aries	Now and Then	August 10, 2010	none
"I Got It"	Indelible	Our Present Future	October 15, 2010	Paranoyd Records
"I Still Fly"	King Dylan	Disheartened	November 26, 2010	none
"The Sky"	K.A.S.P.	Muskwa	December 6, 2010	K.A.S.P.
"Sik Side"	Joey Stylez	The Blackstar: The Lost Filez	December 15, 2010	Stressed Street Entertainment
"Get Smart" and "We Got That" (ft. Opio)	Mr. Brady	Labor of Love	December 22, 2010	DIY Records
"Day That's New" (ft. Teekay) and "Past, Present, Future" (ft. Craig G)	DJ Cosm	Time and Space	2011	Makebelieve Records
"Slow Build"	Gescha	Crayon Politics	2011	SoulDatta Productions
“Questions”	Natural Ensemble	Naturally	2011	Big Rock Records
"The Wasp"	Awol One and Factor Chandelier	The Landmark	February 15, 2011	Fake Four Inc.
"Wake It Up"	Deezuz	Ammmo	April 12, 2011	From Canada Corporation
"Did Ya Find Ya"	Fatty Down	Soup	April 19, 2011	Legendary Entertainment
"Yeah... The World's Ending" (ft. Mac Lethal)	Myer Clarity	Nostalgic Tomorrows	April 28, 2011	none
"Something You Can Feel"	Mr. Brady	Lava Lamp EP	May 7, 2011	DIY Records
"Memory Loss" and "Music & Movies"	Madchild	M.A.D.E. Misguided Angel Destroys Everything	July 7, 2011	Battle Axe Records
"New Season" (ft. Ohmega Watts)	The Extremities	The Mint Condition	July 9, 2011	Droppin’ Science
"That's Luck"	Nick Wisdom	Nightlines	October 18, 2011	Jellyfish Recordings
"Movin" (ft. Tonye Aganaba)	Def3	Amnesia EP	November 9, 2011	none
"Living Legends"	Robbie G	Think	November 11, 2011	R-Evolution Media Studios
"Paper Pathways"	Sixtoo	Free Floating Rationales	2012	Fake Four Inc.
"Tryin"	Factor Chandelier	Old Souls Vol. 3	2012	Side Road Records
"Hustlers Life" (ft. Shaw Langley)	Lion Luciano	The Come Up	2012	C.U.G. Music
"Go Time"	Glad2mecha and Ill Treats	Hello'	January 1, 2012	HHV
"Black Acid Devil"	Madchild	Little Monster EP	January 24, 2012	Battle Axe Records
"Good Morning"	Union	Analogtronics	January 31, 2012	Fat Beats Records
"Yo Yo"	Mr. Brady and Elaquent	Sayin' Somethin' EP	March 3, 2012	DIY Records
"Crowd" (ft. Twigy)	laidbook	Laidbook 12 Different Cities, Different Expressions	March 6, 2012	Origami Productions
"Forward and Back"	Various Artists	A Clean Dose of Music	March 13, 2012	Dopeshit Records
"After All", "Bang Ya Head", "Locked", "Freak Freak" (ft. Bootie Brown), "Produce the Music", "Dedication", "Rap Rap", "Presto" and "Styles"	Mr. Brady	Left Overs, Vol. 3	March 31, 2012	none
"Illusions"	Nomad N3	The 420 Mixtape	April 18, 2012	Space Cowboy
"The Why Song"	Various Artists	URBNET Certified, Vol. 3	June 26, 2012	Urbnet Records
"Dark Lights"	Ishkan	Two Lights	August 22, 2012	Cold Residents
"Good" and "Summertime"	Little T	Back to Basics	August 30, 2012	TNT Star Entertainment Inc
"Motley Crue"	Halabisky's Uprising	Slaying Maya	September 11, 2012	none
"Coffee Shop Gurl" (ft. Mos Eisley)	Fatty Down	Roller Coaster	September 25, 2012	Illegal Ideas Inc
"And It…", "Until the Wheels Fall Off" (ft. Lump), "Wide Open Roads", "How Good" and "Def Before Dishonor Outro"	Definite	Def Before Dishonor	October 15, 2012	none
"It Gets Good"	Potatohead People	Kosmichemusik - EP	November 6, 2012	Jellyfish Recordings
"Cupids Arrow"	Definite	The sheEP: A Chronological Offering For The Broken Hearted	November 10, 2012	none
"Ode to Cosmosis" (ft. Abstract Rude and Freewill)	Myka 9 and Factor Chandelier	Sovereign Soul	November 13, 2012	Fake Four Inc.
"The Pain" (ft. Blackboltt)	Robbie G	Reality	December 12, 2012	Robert Gruenbauer
"Show Me the Money"	Muneshine	Bed Bugs - EP	January 21, 2013	Blunted Astronaut Records
"Below" and "Below [Remix]”	Dandy Teru	Adventures	April 23, 2013	Ubiquity Recordings
"How We Livin" (ft. Birdapres and Def3)	Aries	New Beginnings	May 28, 2013	none
"In the End"	Star Captains	New Freedoms	June 27, 2013	Star Captains
"Fool's Gold" (ft. Elucid and Open Mike Eagle)	Billy Woods	Dour Candy	July 2, 2013	Backwoodz Studioz
"Perfect Days"	Bioson	Red Rain	August 24, 2013	none
"Open"	Jay Tablet	Tablife	September 5, 2013	none
"Make It Happen"	The Emsee	Empty Promises	September 20, 2013	none
"Mental Patients" (ft. Kamikaze)	Iron Lion	The 5th Tablet	September 28, 2013	none
"Loud Enuff"	Rel McCoy	Golden	October 29, 2013	Gamma Delta Productions
"Cap" and "The Mustard Station" (ft. Jeff Spec, Timbuktu and Muneshine)	Ghettosocks	For You Pretty Things	November 5, 2013	Droppin' Science Productions
"Strong"	Diles	Green Chile In the Air, Vol. 3	November 12, 2013	Visceral View Entertainment
"I Don't Need You"	Definite	The sheEP 2: The SHEquel	November 22, 2013	none
"Beach Day" and "Dreamland"	Nick Wisdom	Missus Peel	December 10, 2013	Jellyfish Recordings
"The Dijon Terminal" (ft. Rel McCoy and Ghettosocks)	Jeff Spec	Sperience	2014	Jeff Spec
"Bus Pass Ca$H" (ft. Lil Bit)	Kyprios	The Midnight Sun	January 28, 2014	Spit Shine Music
"Yo!" and "Jewel Piece" (ft. Blu and Johaz)	Mr. Brady	Timing Is Everything	March 18, 2014	Urbnet Records
"Like Us" (ft. Midwest Mindset)	Travis Omen	New World Omen	March 21, 2014	none
"Frequency"	Jazz Spastiks	The Product	April 14, 2014	Jazzplastik
"All Across the Universe"	illuzual	Goodie Bags	May 18, 2014	Aztek Records
"It's All Right Here"	Defizit	Fresh Produce	May 20, 2014	Verda Drive Music
"A Normal Way"	Pacific Shore	Beyond the Mist	June 16, 2014	COSMONOSTRO
"Live It Up" (ft. Panther Matumona)	Def3	Wildlif3	June 24, 2014	Ship Records
"2 Wrongs No Rights" (ft. Dangerous)	Robb Lamar	It Ain't Easy Being Greasy	August 3, 2014	R. Clark
"Stop, Look, Listen"	Middle Name Danger	It's All in Your Head	August 15, 2014	Middle Name Danger
"Where I Live"	Kyirim	Mic Cheque - EP	August 26, 2014	none
"Hey Yo"	The D.C. Show	Drinkognito	October 14, 2014	King Dylan
"Crashed"	Matt Brevner	URBNET - Underground Hip-Hop, Vol 9	October 14, 2014	Urbnet Records
"Never Give Up" (ft. Choclair)	Ambitguous	Devotion	October 15, 2014	Troy Taylor
"You Lose"	Femapco	North American Idol	November 14, 2014	Femapco
"New Era"	bRavenous	The Sunset Never Looked so Bad	January 28, 2015	none
"Stuff Like That"	Korry Deez	Imago	February 17, 2015	Korry Downey
"High 4 Life" (ft. Devin the Dude and Yung Villain)	Kazh	Canadian Ties	March 17, 2015	Capital Wave Entertainment
"In the Evening" (ft. James Ciphurphace)	Robb Lamar and Jo-Blunt	Ducks in a Row	April 1, 2015	Cactus Boys Music Group
"Rehearse", "Dumptruck" and "All Day" (ft. Jon Rogers)	Mr. Brady	Left Overs, Vol. 5	April 4, 2015	DIY Records
"Brand New Paint" (ft. Kirby Dominant) and “Time to Heal”	Justin Brave	Heartbeats	April 21, 2015	Wolf Sheep Records
"Express" (ft. J-Bru and Relic)	Robbie G	Stay Grounded	September 11, 2015	Robert Gruenbauer
"She Burnt My Art", "All Good, Pt. 2" (ft. Ivan Ave) and "All I Need"	Illa J and Potatohead People	Illa J	September 16, 2015	Bastard Jazz Recordings
"Open Sesame" (ft. St/Mi C)	DJ Ragz	Seasoned Bee Sharks Steaks	November 11, 2015	none
"Social Media"	White Mic and Agentstrik9	The Vegetable & The Alien	November 13, 2015	Brussel Sprouts
"Maybloom"	Midflite	Liquid Lullabies	January 22, 2016	Cascade Records
"Fly By"	Ear Dr. Umz	Hear To Heal	January 29, 2016	Lightsleepers
"We Got the Torch Lit"	Iron Lion and Once Loyal	Underground Uprising	February 6, 2016	Iron Lion
"3 Emcees & a Beat" (ft. Cesa)	Dezperado	Where I'm Coming From	March 19, 2016	S. Hyles
"Black Bridge Diaries"	Sound Improvement	Melius Sonus	March 22, 2016	Sound Improvement
"Senseless"	CGB	Homegrown EP	April 19, 2016	Can’t Go Broke
(as Ron Contour) "Abundance" (ft. Peaceful Solutions) and "The Man" (ft. Tone)	Petey Pastel	Electric Palm Trees	April 20, 2016	Pretendagenda Records
"Coastin"	BluntOne	Orbiting Rawbits	August 19, 2016	Vinyl Digitalization
"Planet B" (ft. Dan Emerson)	Dag	Daggystyle	August 19, 2016	Poetry In Motion
"Acid Baths" and "No Other Way"	Various Artists	Bassments of Badmen 3	September 30, 2016	Hand'solo Records
"Love Will Last"	B-Flix	Genuine II	October 25, 2016	B-Flix
"Choices"	Andrew Conroy	1AM in Montreal	November 4, 2016	Flashlight Music Group
"Rewind"	PremRock and Fresh Kils	Leave In Tact	November 11, 2016	Urbnet Records
"Fun House" (with Swollen Members)	Robbie G	Inner Outer Space	November 18, 2016	Robert Gruenbauer
"Despicable"	More or Les	Blow the F**k Up (But Stay Humble)	November 25, 2016	More or Les
"Travel" (ft. Droop)	Gisto and Emotionz	Orbits	December 21, 2016	none
"S.S. (What Up)"	Approach	Elegant Knock	January 20, 2017	Datura Records
"Always" (ft. Juan Klappenbach)	Gas-Lab	Fusion	March 8, 2017	Village Live Records
"See It Now"	Davepsy	Extended Playpen	May 5, 2017	Urbnet Records
"Stay" (ft. Ishkan)	Dayo	Dayo	June 6, 2017	Dayo
"Silencers"	Illa J	Home	June 30, 2017	Jakarta Records
"Up North" (ft. Josh Martinez) and "Stutter"	S-Cape Artist	Grab Yo' Things	August 7, 2017	none
"Stay Turning It Up"	alkimista and Bernard Briga	Desconcierto	August 15, 2017	Alkimista
"Animal Style"	Wizdumb	Shhadows	August 30, 2017	Lo-Flydelity Records
"Win or Lose"	Joseph Rose	Twisted Roots	September 21, 2017	Cosheca Entertainment
"Adventure"	dl.orion	Adventure EP	November 1, 2017	none
"Fight Envy"	Moicano MC	Cascione Mixtape Vol. 2	November 16, 2017	Cannicelle Studio Records
"Message in a Bottle" (ft. Lump)	Human Writes	Inhuman	December 12, 2017	Human Writes
"Skipping Class" (ft. Notion)	illvibe	The Neo-Blues - EP	December 29, 2017	Heavy Aux Music
"Slow Down Fast"	Retrogott and KutMasta Kurt	Vintage Fresh - EP	January 1, 2018	Threshold Recordings
"Walk On By" (ft. Nubia Emmon)	Akompliss	Ascension	January 8, 2018	Akompliss Music Productions
"Notime"	Deheb	The Goldsmith 2	March 1, 2018	none
"All Alone" (ft. Illa J)	Potatohead People	Nick & Astro's Guide to the Galaxy	May 11, 2018	Bastard Jazz Recordings
"Cool Strut", "Unshakable", "Smile" (ft. Hecktick) and "Stop and Think"	Definite	A Scribe Called Def	May 21, 2018	Definite
"Free Tech"	Inglorious RIC	Illuminated	May 24, 2018	Lower Class Collective
"Finally Here"	Friends With the Help	Love Hotel	July 17, 2018	Casual Dad Records
"Liquid Sunshine 2.0"	Gabriel Teodros	History Rhymes If It Doesn't Repeat (A Southend Healing Ritual)	September 21, 2018	none
"Push It Along [Remix]", "Butter [Remix] (ft. Jeff Spec)" and "Skypager [Remix] (ft. Bootie Brown)"	Various Artists	Eclectic Relaxation (A Tribute To A Tribe Called Quest)	November 9, 2018	Chong Wizard Records
"Truth Hurts"	Chilltora and K-Rec	Oneness	November 23, 2018	Casual Dad Records
"Tough Cookies" (ft. Blueprint), "Mashitup", "Sunny Delight" (ft. Tonedeff and Deacon the Villain) and "The Long Way Home" (ft. Abstract Rude)	WISECRVCKER	Supreme Paradigm: The Grand Scheme	December 7, 2018	none
"J-a-P-a-N"	Myka 9 and Factor Chandelier	Years (2009-2019)	January 15, 2019	Side Road Records
"Mo Than You Know"	Diles	Green Chile in the Air, Vol. 8	January 18, 2019	Visceral View Entertainment
"This One's For You" (ft. Luckyiam)	Various Artists	Rethink Everything	January 25, 2019	Brussel Sprouts
"Ole Slangoolee" (ft. Tri-State)	Emotionz	Never Forget to Imagine - EP	September 16, 2019	Wandering Worx
"On & On" (ft. Pacewon)	Dawhud	Auto Reverse	September 27, 2019	none
"Possessed"	Little Red Rum	Child's Play - EP	December 1, 2019	L'Amore Industries
"NahNah"	Joint Beauty	Melty	February 7, 2020	Urbnet Records
"What You're Used To"	Rushden & Diamonds	2020	May 8, 2020	Volunteer Media
"All Day, Every Day" (ft. Ghosties and Jinx TK)	Flvr	Nasty North	May 29, 2020	FLVR Records
"Suffer"	Deceo Ellipsis	Rogue Hero	June 1, 2020	BC Bud Records
"Morning Light"	Sargeant X Comrade	Magic Radio	June 20, 2020	Black Buffalo Records
"Stay Up"	Joint Beauty	AMATSUKA	September 30, 2020	OILWORKS Records
"Ungodly" (ft. Kapok)	Potatohead People	Mellow Fantasy	October 30, 2020	Bastard Jazz Recordings
"Fk'king Around (With My Love)"	Robert Strauss	Odyssey Funk	November 16, 2020	Tokyo Dawn Records
"4awhile"	Gary Juicy	Sonic Route	November 26, 2020	none
"Stand Still"	Approach	Merely, Minutes in a Day (Section 2: Antique Mall)	December 18, 2020	Datura Records
"Smack Up Back Up"	Mr. Brady and Budamunk	Tainted Scrolls of Mr Buda	December 22, 2020	King Tone
"Sunbaked" (ft. Adawgua)	Deadly Nedly	Northernmost Million	February 27, 2021	none
"M-R Slop"	Mr. Brady	Forget About It	March 31, 2021	DIY Records
"I Think Stuff"	DJ VR	Uncut Raw Gems Vol. 1: The Expedition	May 7, 2021	Dopeshit Records
"Candyman" (ft. Wizdumb)	Dawhud	Rise Reign Ruin - EP	June 18, 2021	none
"Rap to the Future" (ft. Dizzy Dustin, Kompoze and Mr. Hooper)	Ramson Badbonez	Lead by Example	August 27, 2021	New Dawn Records
"Love To Give" (ft. Allen Casillas) and "Fly High"	Menacin Johnson	Growth Season	September 24, 2021	none
"Porso Rosso Seiko"	Panax	Look	October 1, 2021	Panax Recordings
"Eyes Wide Open"	Slumber Logic	Greyscale Oblivion	November 1, 2021	none
"BAD APPLE"	Telephone Switches	Preach - EP	January 1, 2022	Church of the Telephone
"Gone Away From Here" (ft. Abstract Rude and Myka 9)	King Khazm	Return of a MAD	February 25, 2022	Fresh Chopped Beats
"So Cold" and "Recipe"	Factor Chandelier	Time Invested II	March 28, 2022	Side Road Records
"Casserole"	Monsoon The Moon Son	Weirdo	March 30, 2022	Lunar Groove Records
"TICKIN' ON the LOW" (ft. Panax and Michael Irish)	Clockwork	Tick Tock Ya Bish Vol 2	April 1, 2022	none
"Need a Light?"	Paradox and ReFlex the Architect	Enough	May 6, 2022	Matthew Klassen
"All In" (ft. O.C.)	DK and Ghettosocks	Listen to the Masters	May 20, 2022	Top of the Heap
"Sharpshooters"	Destruct	The Best You Never Heard	May 27, 2022	Mind The Wax
"Wanna Be on My Posse Cut?"	Wordburglar	Burgonomic	July 29, 2022	Wordburglar Productions
"Shine Magnificent" (ft. Evil Miro)	Teddy Bass	For a Few Dollars More	August 8, 2022	Adhoksaja Records
"Finish Line"	Uncle Fester and Ambeez	Enjoy	October 22, 2022	Beats Don't Lie
"Heart Knows"	Joint Beauty	Nell	November 30, 2022	Trigger Records
"Peace"	Chi Turner	State of the Union + Other Buena Vistas	January 8, 2023	Nursery Control
"Sadness" (ft. MLNY)	Jak Hellington	Sunny Side Up (Eggstended Edition)	January 22, 2023	none
"Uncanny"	Sydequest	The Mystery Tapes: Syde A	March 19, 2023	none
"Gotta Rewind"	Alcynoos, Parental and Loop.Holes	Rewind	March 31, 2023	HHV
"Freak the Form"	Rove	Poke the Bear	July 14, 2023	Audio Recon / Pen Thief Records
"Never 2 Late" (ft. Destruct)	KDUBsos	Palms of Psalms	August 8, 2023	Sirkle of Sound Music
"You Know It" (ft. Dahliam)	Mr. Brady	Sounds Like Summer - EP	August 28, 2023	DIY Records
"After the Sunset" (ft. Thes One)	Uh Huh and Lammping	In My Mind - EP	September 15, 2023	Telephone Explosion Records
"Avoid the Killjoys"	Little Red Rum	Quinquennial	October 21, 2023	L'Amore Industries
"Dusk Hits"	Swamp Thing and Danny Miles	Golden Crab	October 27, 2023	Urbnet Records
"Let Me Go" (ft. 4ize) and "Love Keep" (ft. Checkmate)	K-Rec	ReMission	November 9, 2023	Casual Dad Records
"Time"	Inky and Emotionz	Flow States	November 15, 2023	Wandering Worx
"Sharp Objects"	More or Les	Lil Ole EP	December 8, 2023	Urbnet Records
"Remanence Over Cu"	Ill Sugi and Mr. Brady	Braid Cobain	December 26, 2023	Jiggamens Records
"Never Forget"	Mamarudegyal MTHC	ABREACTION	January 30, 2024	Rudegang Entertainment
"Just Want to Fly Again", "Stuck on Screens", "Awaken", "Exile", "Summer All Year", "Choose Your Fate", "Right on Time" and "Walk You to the Exit"	Akompliss and Laprada	The Collective	February 28, 2024	none
"For The Soul"	Potatohead People	Eat Your Heart Out	May 10, 2024	Bastard Jazz Recordings
"Intro (Sin Permiso)"	Tyan Mills	De Patio - EP	May 12, 2024	none
"Let Me Go pt. 2"	K-Rec and 4ize	Animated Cataclysm	June 3, 2024	Casual Dad Records
"Man Someday" (ft. 4-IZE)	Ostubash and Digital Fiend	WE FIEND, THEY BASH!	October 22, 2024	Calm Bomb Collective
"Cold Chillin"	Eclyse	Art Does Not Have a Beginning, Middle or End	October 29, 2024	Hypogeal Sounds
"Standing" (ft. Carleigh Aikins)	Danny Miles	Beautiful Music (The Ruined Version)	November 22, 2024	Urbnet Records
"Return of the Zulu Beat" (ft. Casual)	Mighty Theodore	The Old Rap Language	December 13, 2024	Urbnet Records
"There We Go" (ft. Myka 9), "Co Sign" and "It Is"	Daybi	First Contact	January 15, 2025	Bombay Records
"Been Up"	Unfinished Business	Been Up EP	March 14, 2025	none
"Playin"	Flatpocket	Ill	April 4, 2025	Augenringe Unter Dem Dritton Auge Records
"Roit"	Mr. Brady, LMNO and Gfear	Caught in the Moment	April 14, 2025	DIY Records
"Twisted Leaves"	Deceo Ellipsis	Immortal Beloved (A Requiem for Deceo)	April 20, 2025	BC Bud Records
"Home"	Ron Gonzales and DJ Proof	End All Be All	May 23, 2025	Rob Gonzales and DJ Proof
"The Levee Breaks" (ft. Breez Evahflowin, Mr. Lif and Prowess the Testament)	Krohme	Before the Animals Know You're Dead	May 30, 2025	Calm Bomb Collective
"Distant Lands" (ft. Prevail, Super Duty Tough Work and DJ Weezl)	Sargeant X Comrade	Power, Vol. 1	June 6, 2025	Mo Gravy Records
"Body on the Froz"	Ulmikundura	Alaska Onetet	June 9, 2025	Ulmikundura
"All These Things"	Cole Minor	Unreleased	July 19, 2025	none
"Spacecraft"	Daybi	Still Of Stars - EP	July 25, 2025	Urbnet Records
"VIBE"	Swaed	VIBE	August 1, 2025	none
"Still on the Marquee"	Timbuktu and T.O. Huxtable	THUNDERDOME	August 22, 2025	Urbnet Records
"Is This It?"	Marz One and Noam Chopski	The Missing Piece	August 26, 2025	none
"Pumpernickel" (ft. Planet Asia)	SOVIETS (Chaix and Jeff Spec)	Tropico	August 28, 2025	Blue Lady
"Sailing" (ft. Saukrates)	Troy Dunnit	BBS	September 19, 2025	NRC Recordings
"Shopping Spree"	Raz Home	Love and Addiction	September 27, 2025	Sky View Entertainment
"More Different" (ft. Saï T)	Soul Intellect and Alcynoos	WestHome	October 10, 2025	HHV
"Say Goodbye To Your Friends"	K-Rec and Birdapres	Say Goodbye To Your Friends	March 6, 2026	Casual Dad Records
"Cats Don't Know"	Marleau	Straight Goods	March 12, 2026	Eastblvd Records
"The Assignment" (ft. Uncle Fester)	Fresh Kils and Myers Clarity	OCDC	May 19, 2026	Urbnet Records
"FlyEnuff4U" and "Inference and Hearsay [94 Remix]"	K-Rec and Checkmate	The Method	May 22, 2026	Casual Dad Records
"Depths I Dive"	Evadentlee	JAZZMYTAZZ	May 22, 2026	Old Oak Recordings
"It's Easy"	Emotionz	Imagination is a Hell of a Drug	June 13, 2026	BC Bud Records
"Organ Time!", "Lions Gate" and "Promised Thomas"	Various Artists	Bassments of Badmen 4	October 2, 2026	Hand'solo Records

== Production credits ==
=== Albums/EPs ===
Title	Artist	Release Date	Label	Format	Notes
Famous Nobody	Fatty Down	2007	Legendary Entertainment	CD, digital download, streaming	Featured in 1 song
Summer Notations	Nebz Supreme (as The Summasound Clinic)	September 22, 2009	Domination Records	CD, digital download	Featured in 4 songs
J Sands Presents... Dankovic - EP	J Sands	April 20, 2015	B.U.K.A Entertainment	CD, digital download, streaming	
Heartbeats	Justin Brave	April 21, 2015	Wolf Sheep Records	CD, digital download, streaming	Featured in 2 songs
Electric Palm Trees	Petey Pastel	April 20, 2016	Pretendagenda Records	Digital download, streaming	Featured in 2 songs
Extended Playpen	Davepsy	May 5, 2017	Urbnet Records	Cassette, CD, digital download, streaming	Featured in 1 song
A Scribe Called Def	Definite	May 21, 2018	none	Digital download, streaming	Featured in 4 songs
History Rhymes If It Doesn't Repeat (A Southend Healing Ritual)	Gabriel Teodros	September 21, 2018	none	CD, LP, digital download, streaming	Featured in 1 song
Supreme Paradigm: The Grand Scheme	WISECRVCKER	December 7, 2018	none	CD, digital download	Featured in 4 songs
Growth Season	Menacin Johnson	September 21, 2021	none	Digital download, streaming	Featured in 2 songs
Preach - EP	Telephone Switches	January 1, 2022	Church of the Telephone	Digital download, streaming	Featured in 1 song
Sunny Side Up (Eggstended Edition)	Jak Hellington	January 22, 2023	none	Cassette, CD, digital download, streaming	Featured in 1 song

Songs

Title	Artist	Album	Release date	Label
"Intro", "Too Quick" and "The Way"	Ishkan	Cousin Coolout	May 23, 2000	City Planners Music
"Personal"	Deep Rooted	A New Beginning	2004	Open Myndz Entertainment
"Rumble"	Sunspot Jonz	No Guts No Glory (Part One)	December 21, 2004	Revenge Entertainment
"That's Truck"	Jeff Spec	The Last Shall Be First Vol. One	2005	none
"Step Inside" (ft. Junk and Aaron Ross)	Baba Brinkman	Lit-Hop	2006	Lit Fuse Records
"Dear Life"	Buck 65	Heck	2007	none
"No Label"	Gabriel Teodros	No Label - EP	February 4, 2007	none
"Salt Water Breeze"	Lenny Diko	Recession Proof	May 1, 2007	UIYB Records
"Kinda Feels", "Runaway", "Nanny Moe", "Love It Down", "Get To Know Ya" and "Lying Next To You"	Fatty Down	Cafe	2008	Legendary Entertainment
"All About You" (ft. Mos Eisley), "Gotta Song" and "Full Time" (ft. Ashleigh Eymann and Suga D)	Fatty Down	Couches & Floors	2008	Legendary Entertainment
"Small Town Talent"	Subway	On the Right Track	2008	Speak Fresh
"Day Job"	Dragon Fli Empire	Intermission EP	May 19, 2008	Makebelieve Records
"Keep the Funk Alive"	Dragon Fli Empire	Redefine	January 13, 2009	Makebelieve Records
"Soul Vibe"	Deep Rooted	D.E.E.P.R.O.O.T.E.D	February 27, 2009	Clear Label Records
"So Tired"	Moon Blazers	Above the Clouds	April 20, 2009	MBZ Recordings
"Pure Raw" (ft. LMNO)	Mr. Brady	Because I Felt Like It - EP	January 25, 2011	none
"Trudgin"	Deezuz	Ammmo	April 12, 2011	From Canada Corporation
"Get A Hold [Remix]"	Various Artists	Do The Dilla 2012 (A Tribute to the Drum Master)	February 12, 2012	Feelin' Music
"Gods Father" and "Words Not Spoken"	Lil B	God's Father	February 27, 2012	Basedworld Records
"When She's High"	Snak the Ripper	White Dynamite	May 22, 2012	Camobear Records / Stealth Bomb Records
"Bed Bugs"	Muneshine	Bed Bugs - EP	January 21, 2013	Blunted Astronaut Records
"Body" and "Comin From"	Frank Friction	Bird Talk	July 2, 2013	Money Maker Records
"Clean It Up" (ft. Has Lo)	Open Mike Eagle	Sir Rockabye - EP	July 7, 2013 Reissue: June 7, 2024	Hellfyre Club / Auto Reverse Records
"The Rubenesque"	Dylan Ross	The Relic	February 20, 2014	Handzum
"Bentley Rolls", "Dom Henley", "Lamborghini Bikini [Remix]", "It's Addicting" and "Change The Knight"	Lord Diamonds	Robert's Quest	January 6, 2015	Volunteer Media
"Super Crush"	Rel McCoy	Gas Money	May 27, 2016	Tinderbox Music
"Gotham Knights" (ft. Tone Spliff)	Marz One	-	January 22, 2022	Monks Music
"Helli Huumo" and "Lavender Mindstate"	abide.n	Eternal Balm For Ancient Wounds	September 9, 2022	555 Records
"Session 2020" (ft. Miles Bonny)	ALTiTUDES	Altitudes	January 16, 2023	DojiMoto Productions
"Loose Time [Remix]"	XL the Band	-	June 2, 2023	Dream Killer
"Dust", "Soul Cries" and "Open Letter to My Cousins in Israel"	Gabriel Teodros	From the Ashes of Our Homes	September 23, 2023	none
"Last of the Analog" and "Black Love, Pt. 2" (ft. Sarah MK)	Gabriel Teodros	Embers	May 31, 2024	none
"Black Asphalt"	Daybi	First Contact	January 15, 2025	Bombay Records
"Rapping Phenomenal", "Cassettes", "Rome (day job retirement)" and "Hathaway's Diner" (ft. emprime)	Epic	Heater In My Truck II	February 27, 2026	Hand'solo Records
"Born This Way"	Various Artists	Bassments of Badmen 4	October 2, 2026	Hand'solo Records

(Note: This list of production credits only includes works produced by Moka Only for other artists and does not include works in which he is a vocalist, aside from albums/EPs where it is noted.)

== Music videos ==
=== As lead artist ===
Title	Album	Year	Director
"Imagine Me"	Lime Green	2001	Wendy Morgan
"Not the Man I Used to Know" (ft. Sunspot Jonz)	Lime Green	2001	Wendy Morgan
"Steppin Thru"	Monsters in the Closet	2002	Wendy Morgan
"Breath" (ft. Nelly Furtado)	Monsters in the Closet	2002	Todd McFarlane
"Watch This"	Heavy (with Swollen Members)	2003	
"Once Again" (ft. Madchild)	The Desired Effect	2005	Duane Chrichton
"Istics/Budd Break"	The Station Agent	2007	Stuey Kubrick
"My Trains"	Airport	2007	Stuey Kubrick
"Search"	Vermilion	2008	
"Do"	Vermilion	2008	
"Raise The Bar"	Vermilion	2008	
"Headlitez"	Psychodelic	2008	
"Go Back"	Psychodelic	2008	
"Starfish"	Carrots and Eggs	2008	
"The Door"	Carrots and Eggs	2008	Abdallah Taher
"Glad"	Saffron (with Factor Chandelier)	2010	Stuey Kubrick
"Wondrous Things"	Saffron (with Factor Chandelier)	2010	Stuey Kubrick
"Confused Nougat"	Saffron (with Factor Chandelier)	2010	Matt Reed
"Canada Line"	Martian Xmas 2010	2010	Jenkin Au
"Grab Grab Grab"	Airport 5	2011	Rod Bailey "mcenroe"
"Rock On"	Airport 5	2011	Rod Bailey "mcenroe"
"Skronk"	Airport 5	2011	Moka Only and Matt Brevner
"Crickets"	Crickets (with Chief)	2011	Mr Spliffberg
"Keep Sucking"	-	2012	Billy Slade
"Hustle Hustle Lemonade"	-	2012	Panayioti Yannitsos
"I'm Swanky"	-	2012	Panayioti Yannitsos and Ashley Mendoza
"Green"	Zzbra: Original Motion Picture Soundtrack	2012	Stuey Kubrick
"Elephant"	Zzbra: Original Motion Picture Soundtrack	2012	Stuey Kubrick
"Let's Roll"	Zzbra: Original Motion Picture Soundtrack	2012	Stuey Kubrick
"Elephant (Remix)" (ft. Snak the Ripper)	-	2012	Stuey Kubrick
"Come Along"	Bridges (with Ayatollah)	2012	Colby O’Neill
"Set Up A Mic"	Bridges (with Ayatollah)	2012	Billy Slade
"Suck My Dick and Do Lunch"	Doctor Do Much	2012	Shaw Langley
"Sleeping Dogs"	Airport 6	2012	Rod Bailey "mcenroe"
"I'm In Space"	Airport 6	2013	Shaw Langley
"The Tighten Up"	Airport 6	2013	Nathan Boey
"Together"	Doctor Do Much	2013	Shaw Langley
"Good Morning Welcome"	Doctor Do Much	2013	Moka Only and Lloyd Field
"Some Ol' New Shit"	Mutant	2013	Moka Only and Lloyd Field
"Always Happy"	Sex Money Moka	2014	Moka Only and Lloyd Field
"What Would Happen"	Sex Money Moka	2014	
"It's Best"	Sex Money Moka	2014	Lloyd Field
"Inside My Heart"	Sex Money Moka	2014	Spencer Keeton Cunningham
"No"	Magickal Weirdness	2015	Michelle Kee
"Do You Know How To Rock"	Magickal Weirdness	2015	Nic Bam
"Nothing To Me"	Magickal Weirdness	2015	Nic Bam
"Chicanery"	Magickal Weirdness	2015	Stuey Kubrick
"Deluxe Edition"	Magickal Weirdness	2015	Stuey Kubrick
"Starting Out"	Magickal Weirdness	2015	Stuey Kubrick
"Somethin' For Warmth"	Martian XMAS 2016	2016	Stace Prints
"It's Brutal"	It's Brutal	2017	Stace Prints
"The Dew In It"	São Paulo	2017	Stace Prints
"Wintertime Divine"	To the Next Season	2017	Stace Prints
"Where We Should Be"	To the Next Season	2017	Stace Prints
"Replay"	Concert for One	2017	Stace Prints
"Are You Happy Now"	Concert for One	2017	Spencer Keeton Cunningham
"Same Ol Song"	Vibes - EP (with Reckognize Real)	2017	Stace Prints
"Overtime"	Vibes - EP (with Reckognize Real)	2017	Stace Prints
"What Comes to Mind" (ft. Ishkan)	Magnesium Opium (with Nowfolk)	2017	Stace Prints
"Say Ahh"	Vibes - EP (with Reckognize Real)	2018	Alfredo Aguilarte
"Tan Jacket"	Myopic Bubble	2018	Billy Slade
"I Been The One"	Patina	2019	Chris Lazar
"Funky Like"	Patina	2019	Chris Lazar
"Your Soul"	Patina	2019	Chris Lazar
"Sense N' Dollarz"	Patina	2019	Mike Mogardo "Deceo"
"Suffer"	-	2020	Mike Mogardo "Deceo"
"Who Are We"	The Mothership - EP (with Switch)	2024	Sean Lyons
"Inference and Hearsay"	Inference and Hearsay - EP (with Checkmate and K-Rec)	2024	Mike Mogardo "Deceo"
"Measures"	Welcome to the Agrodome (with Golden Section)	2026	Mike Mogardo "Deceo"

=== As featured artist ===
Title	Artist	Album	Year	Director
"Fuel Injected"	Swollen Members	Bad Dreams	2001	Wendy Morgan
"Bring It Home"	Swollen Members	Bad Dreams	2001	Wendy Morgan
"Better Days"	Sweatshop Union	Natural Progression	2003	
"Sikside"	Joey Stylez	The Black Star: The Lost Filez	2006	
"Never Fall in Love" (ft. Deezuz)	Fatty Down	Couches & Floors	2008	Stuey Kubrick
"Underground Pop"	Josh Martinez	The World Famous Sex Buffet	2009	Stuey Kubrick
"Quit While You're Ahead" (ft. Maestro Fresh Wes and Choclair)	Classified	Self Explanatory	2009	
"Paradise"	Dragon Fli Empire	Redefine	2009	Wal Martian
"Lucid" (ft. E.D.G.E.)	REL!G!ON	Underground Hip-Hop Volume 5	2010	Nicholas Treeshin
"Fly B.S."	Jeff Spec	Fall Collection 2014	2010	
"Hollywood Square" (ft. Frank Nitt)	The Trillionaires (Sweatshop Union)	By Hook or by Crook	2010	Stuey Kubrick
"Summertime"	Little T	Back to Basics	2011	Drew Hutchinson and Richard Neufel
"Living Legends" (ft. C-Bow)	Robbie G	Think	2012	Tom Brown
"Dragon's Gate"	Def3	-	2013	
"You Lose"	Femapco	North American Idol	2013	Mike Graveline and Lee Superka
"Like Us"	Midwest Mindset	New World Omen (by Travis Omen)	2013	Ronnie Rabena
"Where I Live" (ft. K-Rec)	Kyirim	Mic Cheque - EP	2014	Bryan Fajkovic
"Time to Heal"	Justin Brave	Heartbeats	2016	K.J. McKenzie
"Fun House" (with Swollen Members)	Robbie G	Inner Outer Space	2016	Andrew Gough
"Koolin"	Robbie G	-	2016	Matt Bhird
"What You're Used To"	Rushden & Diamonds	2020	2018	Matt Young and Robert Koch
"Desire"	Luv Randhawa	Believe In Me	2018	Sunny Dhinsey Filmlore
"Promise"	Jinx TK	-	2019	
"Getting By"	Rel McCoy	A Different Crown	2020	
"Right Now"	416Solo	-	2021	
"All In" (ft. O.C.)	DK and Ghettosocks	Listen to the Masters	2022	John Walsh
"Lavender Mindstate"	abide.n	Eternal Balm For Ancient Wounds	2022	
"Free [Remix]" (ft. Prevail)	OurGlassZoo and KutMasta Kurt	-	2023	Diego Lara and Josiah Tschanz
"Distant Lands" (ft. Prevail, Super Duty Tough Work and DJ Weezl)	Sargeant X Comrade	Power, Vol. 1	2026	

(Note: This list of music videos does not include visualizer videos.)
