= Oh Lawd =

Oh Lawd may refer to:

- "Oh Lawd", a song by Zion I from Mind over Matter (2000)
- "Oh Lawd", a song by Moka Only from Road Life (2000)
- "Oh Lawd", a song by Stylo G (2020)
