= Flood (Moka Only album) =

Studio album by Moka Only
- Released: September 17, 2002
- Recorded: May 2000 – March 2001
- Genre: Hip-hop
- Length: 72:17
- Label: Underworld Inc.
- Producer: Moka Only

Moka Only chronology
Moka Only is... Ron Contour (2001)	Flood (2002)	Lowdown Suite (2003)

Flood is a studio album by Canadian rapper, singer and producer Moka Only. It was released in limited quantities by Underworld Inc. on September 17, 2002. The album was entirely self-produced, and features guest appearances from Ishkan, Gabriel Teodros, Sunspot Jonz, and Mr. Brady.

The song "Love Can't Wait" was in the season one soundtrack of the television series The L Word.

== Recording ==
The album was recorded from May 2000 to March 2001 at Moka's home studio and Hipposonic Studios, where the album was mixed. Prior to its release, the working title of the album was Flood the Market.

"Walking Through Langford" was based on his home city. "Take It In" with Ishkan, was originally intended for their group Nowfolk's 2002 album The Moon. "Liquid Sunshine" with Gabriel Teodros, was recorded in 2001, before Teodros had released any music. "If You Was (Sunshine)" with Sunspot Jonz, was intended for a collaboration album between the two, which never released. The instrumental for "Familiarize Yourself" contains samples of train sounds captured by Moka on a handheld cassette recorder. Moka played trumpet on two songs, "The Knock" and "True Analogy". The latter was recorded with Mr. Brady, following the first Battle Axe Warriors tour. "No One Loves Me" was recorded a night before the filming of Moka and Sunspot Jonz "Not the Man I Used to Know" music video, from his 2001 album Lime Green.

== Critical reception ==
Professional ratings
Review scores
Source	Rating
HipHopCore	4/5 stars

Martin Turenne of The Georgia Straight called the album "a meticulous hybrid of jazz and hip-hop made with music nerds in mind".

HipHopCore noted "Moka has a certain humility, humor and hindsight that make him infallibly favor jazzy atmospheres and groove to confessional atmospheres" and said "He favors the melody while often integrating subtle variations in his flow and loops (especially at the end of the song)." They called it an "authentic and sublimely spontaneous album".

== Track listing ==
No.	Title	Length
1.	"Hello Hello"	2:27
2.	"Get Up, Clap Your Hands"	4:43
3.	"Livin' It For Ya"	4:44
4.	"Walking Through Langford"	4:55
5.	"Instrumental Interlude #1"	1:00
6.	"Take It In" (featuring Ishkan)	3:47
7.	"Pure Sex"	3:18
8.	"Liquid Sunshine" (featuring Gabriel Teodros)	4:43
9.	"Instrumental Interlude #2"	1:34
10.	"Work Cut Out For Me"	3:28
11.	"If You Was (Sunshine)" (featuring Sunspot Jonz)	3:35
12.	"Sunday"	3:25
13.	"Familiarize Yourself"	3:36
14.	"Love Can’t Wait"	4:05
15.	"The Knock"	4:54
16.	"True Analogy" (featuring Mr. Brady)	3:36
17.	"No One Loves Me…"	4:04
18.	"Instrumental Interlude #3"	1:14
19.	"Nights Like These"	5:31
20.	"Instrumental Outro"	3:38
Total length:		72:17
