= Imagine Me =

- "Imagine Me", a single by Moka Only from the 2001 album Lime Green
- "Imagine Me", a song by Kirk Franklin from the 2005 album Hero
