= No One Loves Me =

- "No One Loves Me…", a song by Moka Only from the album Flood, 2002
- "No One Loves Me", a song by Black Eyed Peas from the album Elevation, 2022
