= Take It Slow =

- "Take It Slow", a song by Technotronic from the album Pump Up the Jam, 1989
- "Take It Slow", a song by Moka Only from the album Lowdown Suite, 2003
- "Take It Slow", a song by Red Velvet from the EP Ice Cream Cake, 2015
