= Going In =

Going In or Goin' In may refer to:

- "Goin' In", song by Jennifer Lopez
- "Goin' In", song by Birdy Nam Nam from Jaded Future EP 2012, remixed by Skrillex
- "Goin' In", single by Sam Butera, 1955
- "Going In", song by Moka Only from I'm Delighted, 2016

== See also ==
- "I'm Goin' In", song by Drake from So Far Gone
