= Mr. Brady =

American rapper and record producer

- Born: Brandon Crowel
- Origin: San Diego, California, United States
- Genres: Hip-hop; instrumental hip-hop
- Occupations: Rapper; songwriter; record producer
- Years active: 1993–present
- Labels: Battle Axe Records; Urbnet Records; DIY Records
- Formerly of: Deep Rooted; Mr. Mista; Pimpin' Comprehension; Spacesuits

Brandon Crowel, better known by his stage name Mr. Brady, is an American rapper and record producer from San Diego, California.

== Career ==
He debuted in 1995 on the Milky Wayne produced split EP The Backroad. One side featured Tony Da Skitzo, while the other featured Brady and Diz as Pimpin' Comprehension. In 2002, he released his first solo album Dusty Baker through sub-label Underworld Inc, followed in 2003 by Dirty with Battle Axe Records. From 2004 to 2009, he was a member of the group Deep Rooted.

In 2010 he released his third solo album titled Labor of Love, and Banger Management, his first collaboration album with LMNO. He released multiple EPs in 2011 and 2012, including collaborations with producers Abjo and Elaquent, as well as his first collaboration project with Moka Only as Mr. Mista.

In 2014, he released his fourth solo album, Timing is Everything, and the group album Spacesuits with Jules Chaz, LMNO and Moka Only on Urbnet Records. In 2015, he released his second collaboration album with LMNO, titled 25/8. Also in 2015, he joined the collective Torchlight Commission with A-Ro, Illa J, Ishkan, Jeff Spec, Jon Rogers, Jules Chaz, LMNO, Moka Only, Mosiac, and Potatohead People. In 2017, he released his fifth solo album, an instrumental album titled Speechless.

== Discography ==
=== Solo albums ===
- Dusty Baker (Underworld Inc., 2002)
- Dirty (Battle Axe Records, 2003)
- Labor of Love (Clear Label Records, 2010)
- Timing is Everything (Urbnet Records, 2014)
- Speechless (Urbnet Records, 2017)
- Did I Do That? (self-released, 2019)
- Beautiful Mistakes (DIY Records, 2024)
- Still Dirty (DIY, 2025)
- God's Plan (DIY, 2026)
- I Almost Forgot (DIY, 2026)

=== Collaboration albums ===
- Banger Management (with LMNO) (Up Above Records, 2010)
- Spacesuits (with Jules Chaz, LMNO and Moka Only as Spacesuits) (Urbnet, 2014)
- 25/8 (with LMNO) (Urbnet, 2015)
- Raw Currency (with LMNO) (DIY, 2020)
- Tainted Scrolls of Mr. Buda (with BudaMunk) (King Tone, 2020)
- Forget About It (with Gfear) (DIY, 2021)
- Art (with BudaMunk) (King Tone, 2023)
- Braid Cobain (with Ill Sugi) (Jiggamens Records, 2023)
- Mr. Mista 2008-2021 Vaults, Vol. 1 (with Moka Only as Mr. Mista) (DIY, 2024)
- Eloquent Filth (with Figueroa) (No Labels, 2025)
- Caught in the Moment (with LMNO and Gfear) (DIY Records, 2025)
- 3 Peat (with BudaMunk) (King Tone, 2026)

=== EPs ===
- The Backroad (with Milky Wayne and Tony Da Skitzo as Pimpin' Comprehension) (Limbo St. Recordings, 1995; reissued, LowCal Records, 2018)
- Because I Felt Like It (DIY, 2011)
- Lava Lamp (DIY, 2011)
- The Bug Out (with Moka Only as Mr. Mista) (DIY, 2012)
- Welcome to the City (with Abjo) (self-released, 2012)
- Say Somethin' (with Elaquent) (DIY, 2012)
- The Vibe Complex (DIY, 2015)
- JMB's Vol. 1 (with Jon Rogers and Moka Only as JMB's) (HiWave Records, 2019)
- Sounds Like Summer (DIY, 2023)

=== Mixtapes ===
- Left Overs (self-released, 2009)
- Left Overs, Vol. 2 (DIY, 2010)
- Left Overs, Vol. 3 (DIY, 2012)
- Left Overs, Vol. 4 Beat Tape (DIY, 2014)
- Left Overs, Vol. 5 (DIY, 2015)
- Left Overs, Vol. 6 Beat Tape (DIY, 2019)
- Left Overs, Vol. 7 Beat Tape (DIY, 2024)
- Left Overs, Vol. 8 Beat Tape (DIY, 2026)
