= Lime Green (album) =

Studio album by Moka Only
- Released: April 3, 2001
- Recorded: 1999–2000
- Studio: Hipposonic Studios
- Genre: Hip-hop
- Length: 53:48
- Label: Battle Axe Records
- Producers: Moka Only; Paul Nice; Sichuan; DJ Science

Moka Only chronology
Mokefluenza (2001)	Lime Green (2001)	The Quick Hits (2001)

Singles from Lime Green
- 1. "Imagine Me" Released: 2000; 2. "Been There" Released: 2000

Lime Green is a studio album by Canadian rapper, singer and producer Moka Only. It was released by Battle Axe Records on April 3, 2001. The album was produced by Moka Only (also credited as Ron Contour, Flow Torch and Mr. Denton), Paul Nice, Sichuan, DJ Science, and features guest appearances from Sunspot Jonz, Abstract Rude, Madchild, LMNO, and Swollen Members.

Four songs from Lime Green first appeared on the 2000 compilation album Battle Axe Warriors. Two music videos were released in 2001, for the songs "Imagine Me" and "Not the Man I Used To Know", both directed by Wendy Morgan.

The songs "Imagine Me" and "Rolling Along" were in the soundtrack of the video game Transworld Surf. The songs "Crunch" and "Rolling Along" appeared in the soundtrack of NBA Live 2002. "Crunch" was also included on the 2002 album Monsters in the Closet by Swollen Members. "Rolling Along" was in the first episode of the television series Playmakers. In a 2010 Nardwuar interview, Drake received a 12-inch single of "Imagine Me".

== Recording ==
The album was recorded in 1999 and 2000 at Hipposonic Studios. The production of the album was primarily synth-driven. "Magnitude" is an alternate take of the song "Floating", from his 2000 album Road Life.

== Critical reception ==
Professional ratings
Review scores
Source	Rating
AllMusic	3/5 stars
HipHopCore	4/5 stars
HipHopInfinity	3.66/5 stars
RapReviews	8/10

Professional ratings for "Imagine Me"
Review scores
Source	Rating
Rebirth Magazine	3.5/5 stars

Todd Kristel of AllMusic noted Moka's lyrics "may be introspective but they're not particularly dark or disturbing", saying "the songs are catchy and appealing although the jazzy piano, cheesy synths, bouncy basslines, and two-part harmonies may be too sugary for some listeners."

CMJ New Music Report said "For the most part, Lime Green is another solid, enjoyable run from a remarkably ambitious and motivated lyricist/producer. But the occasional misstep makes you want to scream at Moka from the side-lines".

HipHopCore said "he succeeds in each title to achieve a very personal result, not hesitating to push the song on occasion."

Jack Leo of HipHopInifinity expressed the album "simply feels like summer" and "conveys a sunny and carefree vibe, one that is reminiscent of Kerouac's On the Road in its philosophies."

Impact Press compared him to The Roots, A Tribe Called Quest and Common. They stated "Moka rhymes nice but doesn't say much. The production (mostly by Moka) picks up the slack and balances out the minor inconsistencies."

Knowledge Magazine called it "an officially inspirational album" with "wily, soulful and complex material". They praised his wordplay, "natty singing voice" and "soul dripping" melodies, comparing him to Mos Def and Common.

Gary Smith of Music & Media claimed "By mixing a strong sense of the classic song with some intelligent, entertaining rhyming, the album has an immediacy that comes as much from finesse and intelligence as it does from the undeniably strong tunes."

Jayson Young of RapReviews called it "laid-back" and stated "Where Moka Only excels is definitely his calm, musical flow. With a voice that can best be compared to Common".

In a review of the single "Imagine Me", Rebirth Magazine said "This anti-sellout song stresses the hardships of being an emcee and emphasizes that money makes people lose sight of why they started rapping in the first place."

== Track listing ==
No.	Title	Producer(s)	Length
1.	"Magnitude"	Moka Only	4:47
2.	"Skeletons"	Moka Only	3:18
3.	"Not the Man I Used to Know" (featuring Sunspot Jonz)	Moka Only	3:39
4.	"Rolling Along" (featuring Abstract Rude)	Paul Nice	5:18
5.	"Ferry Tales"	Ron Contour	3:45
6.	"Live It"	Flow Torch	3:20
7.	"Formula Fresh" (featuring Madchild)	Moka Only; DJ Science	3:55
8.	"Imagine Me"	Moka Only	3:15
9.	"Invisible"	Ron Contour	2:48
10.	"Team Work" (featuring LMNO)	Sichuan	4:06
11.	"Expedition"	Moka Only	3:22
12.	"August Asphalt"	Mr. Denton	3:31
13.	"Dawn Light"	Moka Only	2:51
14.	"Crunch" (featuring Swollen Members)	Paul Nice	2:45
15.	"Been There"	Moka Only	3:08
Total length:			53:48

== Personnel ==
- Moka Only – vocals (tracks: 1–15), producer (tracks 1–3, 7, 8, 11, 13, 15), as Ron Contour (tracks: 5, 9), as Flow Torch (track 6), as Mr. Denton (track 12)
- Roger Swan – recording, mixing (tracks: 1–15)
- Nucleus – executive producer
- Madchild – executive producer, vocals (tracks: 7, 14)
- Sunspot Jonz – vocals (track 3)
- Abstract Rude – vocals (track 4)
- LMNO – vocals (track 10)
- Prevail – vocals (track 14)
- Paul Nice – producer (tracks 4, 14)
- DJ Science – producer (track 7)
- Sichuan – producer (track 10)
