= Visionaries (hip-hop group) =

American hip-hop group

- Origin: Los Angeles, California
- Genres: Hip-hop; alternative hip-hop
- Years active: 1995–present
- Labels: Up Above Records; Visionaries Crew, Inc.
- Members: 2Mex; LMNO; R.ēL.Z.M. (Lord Zen); Dannu; Key-Kool; DJ Rhettmatic
- Website: visionarieshiphop.com

Visionaries is an underground hip-hop group from Los Angeles, California. The group formed in 1995, and have since released five full-length albums on Up Above Records, and their own label Visionaries Crew, Inc., with their sixth studio album scheduled to release in 2026.

The crew's six members have collectively released over fifty solo and side projects. They have collaborated and performed with many other artists, including Wu-Tang Clan, Nas, Common, Mos Def, Talib Kweli, Dilated Peoples, De La Soul, Blackalicious, Jean Grae, Psycho Realm, J Dilla, Jurassic 5 and Linkin Park.

== Members ==
- 2Mex
- LMNO
- R.ēL.Z.M. a.k.a. "Lord Zen"
- Dannu
- Key-Kool
- DJ Rhettmatic

== Discography ==
- Galleries (Up Above Records; 1998)
- Sophomore Jinx (Up Above Records; 2000)
- Pangaea (Up Above Records; 2004)
- We Are the Ones (We've Been Waiting For) (Up Above Records; 2006)
- Est 1995 (Mixtape) (2007)
- V (Visionaries Crew, Inc.; 2021)
- Sketches (Visionaries Crew, Inc.; 2024)

== Solo projects ==
2Mex, LMNO and DJ Rhettmatic

Lord Zen and Dannu (known as Writer's Block)

- En Route (2001)
- Next Stop (2005)

R.ēL.Z.M. (also known as Lord Zen)

- 50.5.10 (2006) with band LVX Collective
- Wakefull Dead (2007) collaboration with producer DeeSkee
- Love D'LVX (2008) with band LVX Collective
- Pre-Flight Acknowledgements (2014)

Dannu

- Virgo Summer (2011)
