= Potatohead People =

Canadian record production duo

- Origin: Vancouver, British Columbia, Canada
- Genres: Hip-hop; electronic
- Occupation: Record producer
- Years active: 2008–present
- Labels: Jellyfish; Bastard Jazz; Mystery Box
- Members: Nick Wisdom; Nate Drobner

Potatohead People is a Canadian record production duo composed of Nick Wisdom and Nate Drobner (Astrological), formed in 2008. Both members have also released multiple albums individually.

== Career ==
The duo debuted in 2011 with the EP Tomatos, followed by two more EP's in 2012 titled Mellowtunes and Kosmichemusik. Their song "Back To My Shit" (featuring Frank Nitt) was featured on a 2013 LeBron James documentary.

In 2015, they released their debut album titled Big Luxury, with guest appearances from Illa J and Moka Only. Also in 2015, they produced Illa J's self-titled album, which includes the song "Strippers" co-produced with Kaytranada. In the same year, they joined the collective Torchlight Commission with A-Ro, Illa J, Ishkan, Jeff Spec, Jon Rogers, Jules Chaz, LMNO, Moka Only, Mosaic, and Mr. Brady.

In 2018, the duo released their second album Nick & Astro’s Guide to the Galaxy, which features guest appearances from Illa J and Moka Only. In 2019, they released an Instrumentals, Remixes & B-Sides version.

In 2020, they released their third album Mellow Fantasy, with guest appearances from Illa J, Kapok, T3, Clear Mortifee, Posdnuos, Kendra Dias, Moka Only, Reggie B and Bunnie. Compex ranked the album number 15 in their list of the best Canadian albums of 2020. Yardbarker listed the album in their top 30 albums of the year.

In 2021, they released two singles with the late Phife Dawg, titled "French Kiss Deux" and "French Kiss Trois" (featuring Redman and Illa J). The latter of the two appeared on Phife Dawg's posthumously released 2022 album Forever.

In 2024, they released their fourth album Eat Your Heart Out, with guest appearances from Kendra Dias, Redman, Shafiq Husayn, Ivan Ave, Kapok, Abstract Rude, T3, Diamond Cafe, Frank Nitt, Reggie B, Moka Only.

In 2025, the duo released their fifth album Emerald Tablet, a collaboration with Slippery Elm. The album features a guest appearance from Bahamadia. An instrumental version of the album was released in 2026.

== Discography ==
=== Potatohead People ===
- Tomatos - EP (2011)
- Mellowtunes - EP (2012)
- Kosmichemusik - EP (2012)
- Big Luxury (2015)
- Illa J (2015) (with Illa J)
- Nick & Astro’s Guide to the Galaxy (2018)
  - Instrumentals, Remixes & B-Sides (2019)
- Mellow Fantasy (2020)
- Eat Your Heart Out (2024)
- Emerald Tablet (2025) (with Slippery Elm)
  - Instrumentals (2026)

=== Nick Wisdom ===
- Nightlines (2011)
- Vibe Guru (2012)
- Missus Peel (2013)

=== Astrological ===
- Living Fossils (2010)
- Far Far Away (2011)
- Polynesian Dream (2011)
- Flux (2011)
- Stereotypes - EP (2012)
- Truthseeker (2013)
- Instrumentals & B-Sides (2016)
- Resilience (2024)
