= Incura =

Canadian metal band

INCURA
- Origin: Lethbridge, Alberta, Canada
- Genres: cinematic metal, symphonic metal, hard rock,
- Years active: 2003–present
- Labels: Warner Music Canada, Coalition Music (Records), Inside Out/Century Media
- Members: Phil Gardner - Drums; Kyle Gruninger - Vocals; Jim McLaren – Keys; Jono Olson - Bass; Gatlin Fitzgerald - Guitar
- Past members: Royce Whittaker; Adam Rosner; Jeff Arnold
- Website: incura.net

INCURA is a Canadian cinematic metal band based in Lethbridge, Alberta. Their musical style is a unique blend of hard rock, prog and metal instrumentals, with high vocals. The band's name is a combination of their previous name, INVEIN, and the Cura spell from the Final Fantasy game series.

== History ==
=== Origins, high school and the Lethbridge scene ===
INCURA formed in Lethbridge, Alberta. Original guitar player Gatlin Fitzgerald attended Wilson Jr High School with bass player Jono Olson, and Lethbridge Collegiate Institute with Kyle during their high school years. All three musicians were heavily involved in the local music scene; Gat and Jono played in a band called "Last in Line" while Kyle performed with a band called "Dislexic". After being introduced by mutual friends from the Lethbridge scene, the trio began to jam together on a regular basis. Drummer Adam Rosner, who also attended LCI, was invited to join in on these sessions, and the group began writing music under the name "Invein."

=== New West Theatre; Kyle meets Jim ===
Kyle was active in the competitive chamber choir circuit in high school, and his performance background lead him to study at the University of Lethbridge after graduation. During this time he worked to make ends meet performing stage shows and musical reviews with "New West Theatre," a professional theatre company in the area. It was here that Kyle met Jim McLaren. Jim was given a demo that the band had done, and he recorded piano tracks over top.

=== Invein to INCURA ===
In 2003, the original band lineup recorded an EP, titled A Way Out. The recording process was productive for the quartet – while Fitzgerald, Gruninger, Olson, and Rosner were relatively happy with the tracks, they did not feel that A Way Out best represented the band artistically. Over the course of the next two years the quartet worked out their creative vision, inviting keyboard player McLaren to join the group during the recording process of their next EP, 2005's Is Everyone Ready to Face What We're Fighting For.

Similarly, the band grew tired of the name INVEIN after the release of their 2003 EP. Though it had the right vibe for the band's new music, many other groups also used it as a moniker. The material generated for the 2005 EP by Fitzgerald, Gruninger, Olson, and Rosner was highly original, and the addition of McLaren's keyboard playing marked a genre shift for the band away from more conventional metal. The group decided to change their name keeping the "IN" and adding "CURA" – a healing spell from the Final Fantasy RPGs. In that moment INCURA was born.

=== Vancouver and beyond ===
In 2006, all five of the members of INCURA moved to Vancouver, British Columbia. The quintet spent the next several years playing extensively and became staples in the British Columbia hard rock scene. They recorded another EP, swords.souls.secrets, in 2007, and shortly after its release Rosner left the group. He was replaced by a friend of the band from Lethbridge, Jeff Arnold.

In 2008, INCURA competed in the CFOX-FM Vancouver Seeds music competition. They were ultimately awarded the top prize, joining the ranks of past winners Bif Naked, Matthew Good, Gob, and Faber Drive. As a part of the Platinum prize the band opened for Sloan and the Stone Temple Pilots on August 30, 2008.

In 2009, the band attended Canadian Music Week in Toronto, Ontario. Following their stay in Toronto INCURA recorded a seven track EP titled The Lost. Shortly after its June release, drummer Jeff Arnold left the group and Phil Gardner joined the band.

Manager Rob Lanni had mentored the members of INCURA as part of their prize package from the 2008 FOX Seeds competition. The band signed to Coalition Music (Records)/Warner Music Canada late in 2009.

=== Coalition Music (Records)/Warner Music Canada & Inside Out/Century Media ===
The three years after The Lost EP marked the longest break from recording in the band's history. The band gigged extensively in Vancouver and abroad with their new tunes, most notably opening for Apocalyptica in May 2012, and playing the huge club-run Reeperbahn Festival in Hamburg, Germany, in September 2012. They continued to write new material and in 2012 they recorded and released a six-song self-titled EP. Because of the band's heavy performance schedule and their use of the new material in their 2012 shows, their self-titled EP became known by the members and their fans as The Tour EP.

Long-time guitarist Gatlin Fitzgerald left the band near the end of 2012, after the tracking of the band's self-titled, full-length release from Coalition Music (Records)/Warner Music Canada. Fitzgerald was replaced by Royce Whittaker, whose former band had shared a jam space with INCURA in Vancouver.

In January 2013, INCURA launched a national Canadian tour, dubbed the "Theatre of Anarchy Tour" in advance of their full-length debut with Coalition Music (Records)/Warner Music Canada. Their tour-mates included 40 Sons and Six Side Die.

In 2014, Incura signed a deal with Inside Out/Century Media and released their self-titled record across Europe/UK on February 26th 2014. After a 2-year hiatus Gatlin rejoined the band as lead guitarist. The band is currently recording new material.

Incura albums
A Way Out (EP)	2003
Is Everyone Ready to Face What We're Fighting For? (EP)	2005
swords.souls.secrets (EP)	2007
The Lost EP	2009
INCURA (The Tour EP)	2012
INCURA	2013
INCURA (European Edition)	2014
Incura II	2017

INCURA Singles
"Who You Are"	January 2013
"Turning Blue"	January 2013
"The Greatest Con"	March 2014
"Pocket Full of Pills"	July 2017
"Remodel"	March 2019
"Living A Lie"	July 2019

INCURA videos
"Here to Blame" Animated Video	May 7, 2010
"I'd Give Anything" Official Lyric Video	January 16, 2013
"Who You Are" Official Music Video	February 6, 2013
"Turning Blue" Official Lyric Video	February 15, 2013
"Get the Gun" Official Lyric Video	February 26, 2013
"The Greatest Con" Official Music Video	March 7, 2014
