= Mellow Fantasy =

Studio album by Potatohead People
- Released: October 30, 2020
- Genres: Hip-hop; instrumental hip-hop
- Length: 38:59
- Label: Bastard Jazz Recordings
- Producer: Potatohead People

Potatohead People chronology
Nick & Astro’s Guide to the Galaxy (2018)	Mellow Fantasy (2020)	Eat Your Heart Out (2024)

Mellow Fantasy is the third studio album by Canadian production duo Potatohead People (Nick Wisdom and Nate Drobner). The album was released on October 30, 2020 by Bastard Jazz Recordings. It features guest appearances from Illa J, Kapok, T3, Clear Mortifee, Posdnuos, Kendra Dias, Moka Only, Reggie B and Bunnie.

== Critical reception ==
Professional ratings
Review scores
Source	Rating
ScratchedVinyl	7/10
StGA	5.7/10

=== Accolades ===
Mellow Fantasy on year-end lists
Publication	List	Rank	Ref.
Compex	The 20 Best Canadian Albums of 2020	15	
Yardbarker	The 30 Best Albums of 2020	-	

== Track listing ==
All tracks produced by Nick Wisdom and Nate Drobner

No.	Title	Length
1.	"1st Light"	1:50
2.	"In the Garden"	3:33
3.	"What It Feels Like" (featuring Illa J, Kapok and T3)	3:33
4.	"Hidden Levels" (featuring Clear Mortifee)	3:50
5.	"Baby Got Work" (featuring Posdnuos and Kapok)	3:31
6.	"Proof in the Pudding"	1:35
7.	"Break Even" (featuring Kendra Dias)	2:55
8.	"Ungodly" (featuring Kapok and Moka Only)	3:35
9.	"Island Delivery"	1:47
10.	"Bring the World a Little Closer" (featuring Reggie B)	4:01
11.	"Kettle Boiling" (featuring Bunnie)	4:26
12.	"Ode to Mr. Jacobs"	1:04
13.	"All the Way"	3:19
Total length:		38:59
