= Road Life =

- Original cover

Studio album by Moka Only
- Released: August 15, 2000
- Studio: Mammal Studios
- Genre: Hip-hop
- Length: 74:04
- Labels: Perilunar; Legendary Entertainment
- Producer: Moka Only

Moka Only chronology
Beauty is a Free Road (2000)	Road Life (2000)	Flowtorch (with Deceo Ellipsis) (2000)

Digital cover

Road Life is a studio album by Canadian rapper, singer and producer Moka Only (also known as Flowtorch). It was released by Perilunar on August 15, 2000, and later released digitally by Legendary Entertainment. The album was entirely self-produced, and features guest appearances from Ishkan, Sunspot Jonz, and Jeff Spec. It reached number 8 on !earshot's hip-hop chart in June 2001.

== Recording ==
The album was entirely produced and recorded by Moka at his home studio, Mammal Studios. He produced tracks for the album with a Korg Triton.

"Floating" is the original take of the song "Magnitude", from his 2001 album Lime Green. "Trackside" is an instrumental track which contains samples of train sounds. "Face 2 Tha Sky" samples Moka's own voice, from the (previously unreleased) song "Moked Out", which was recorded with DJ Moves in March of 1999 in Toronto. "Detectives" samples a saxophone from the film The Whole Nine Yards. He aimed for a "minimalist approach" on "Oh Lawd" by using deliberately sloppy sample placement and creating the snare sound with a glass countertop. "We In This" was inspired by Al Jarreau. "Yeah Baby, That's the Style" was the final song recorded for the album, noted by Moka as a more recent take of "Check My Style".

== Critical reception ==
Professional ratings
Review scores
Source	Rating
HipHopInfinity	4/5 stars
Now	3/5 Ns
UGS Mag	4/5 stars

Neil Drumming of CMJ New Music Monthly defined the album as "laid-back synth funk and clever introspection".

Thomas Quinlan of Exclaim! said "it's some hits, some misses and a few in-betweens. When the album falters, it's because of beats that are not powerful enough for Moka to truly flex his skills over. The winners succeed for the exact opposite reasons".

Martin Turenne of The Georgia Straight described the album as "a sprawling disc that marked a definitive turn away from straight-up rap toward something far more experimental, suffused with found sounds and live instrumentation" and "an obsessive document of Moka's everyday life".

HipHopDX said "Moka lets his jazz influenced hypnotic rhythm take over" and noted "his delivery's tight, and rhymes provoke thought".

Jay Seagraves of HipHopInfinity called the album "a subtly thematic masterpiece, recreating the carefree synth sound of the late eighties" and picked "Good Times Stack" as the best track.

Matt Galloway of Now claimed "he’s almost too laid-back for his own good", with a "voice that sounds like Common" and production that "reinforce the chilled-out vibe".

UGS Mag noted "Moka's weapon of choice is the Korg Triton, and with that he creates a very distinctive production style of which the whole album is molded around. The result is a wonderfully unique blend of the early 90's hip-hop sound and the funk vibe of the 80's."

== Track listing ==
No.	Title	Length
1.	"Intro"	1:21
2.	"Whole New Day"	3:15
3.	"La La La"	4:00
4.	"In His Eyes"	3:09
5.	"1950 Love"	0:38
6.	"Good Times Stack" (featuring Ishkan)	3:51
7.	"Floating"	5:16
8.	"Trackside"	1:43
9.	"Madness" (featuring Sunspot Jonz)	2:45
10.	"Pig Pussy"	0:14
11.	"Face 2 Tha Sky"	0:47
12.	"Check My Style"	1:58
13.	"Wild Blue Beat"	0:24
14.	"Most Prolific"	4:59
15.	"Major Gap"	4:34
16.	"Things I Know"	4:11
17.	"Detectives"	3:52
18.	"Knockin Like This"	3:13
19.	"Sweet Turmoil Beat"	0:34
20.	"Oh Lawd"	4:29
21.	"We In This"	3:45
22.	"Underbubblers"	2:24
23.	"1-2 Beat"	0:45
24.	"Ya Baby, That’s The Style" (featuring Jeff Spec)	3:52
25.	"Outro"	*8:05
Total length:		74:04

- "Outro" ends at 0:45, Hidden track "Yeah..Gimme a Baby" plays at 4:00
