= 12 albums for 2016 =

#12albumsFor2016

Studio album series by Moka Only
- Released: 2016
- Recorded: 2001-2003, 2012, 2016
- Genre: Hip-hop
- Label: Urbnet Records

Moka Only chronology
California Sessions Vol. 2 (2015)	#12albumsFor2016 (2016)	Concert for One (2017)

#12albumsFor2016 is a series of twelve studio albums by Canadian rapper, singer and producer Moka Only, released monthly in 2016. The albums were released digitally and as a limited edition, two part cassette collection by Urbnet Records.

Five of the albums placed on !earshot hip-hop charts in 2016, Brutal at number 4 in March, São Paulo at number 1 in April, I'm Delighted at number 15 in August, #99 at number 11 in September and Milky State at number 6 in November. São Paulo ranked number 17 on their 2016 year-end hip-hop chart. To the Next Season reached number 6 in June 2017.

== Recording ==
Two of the albums, Magnesium Opium and The Winter From 2001, were released with Ishkan as Nowfolk. The recordings were recovered from Moka's ADAT system, which was damaged in June 2003. California Sessions Vol. 3 is the final album of another of his album series, which was introduced a year prior and contains material recorded in 2003. Malkin Jackson: Summerland was mostly recorded in 2012, following time spent in the Okanagan region of British Columbia.

The name Brutal is a reference to brutalist architecture. São Paulo was based on the city of the same name. Re-Bent Twisted and Gnarled was dedicated to Ishkan's 1999 album. I'm Delighted is an instrumental album. Martian Xmas 2016 is the thirteenth edition of his annual Martian Xmas series.

== Album listing ==
- Brutal
  - Release date: January 22
- Magnesium Opium (with Ishkan as Nowfolk)
  - Release date: February 19
- São Paulo
  - Release date: March 25
- Re-Bent Twisted and Gnarled
  - Release date: April 29
- I'm Delighted
  - Release date: May 27
- Malkin Jackson: Summerland
  - Release date: June 25
- #99
  - Release date: July 29
- California Sessions Vol. 3
  - Release date: August 26
- Milky State
  - Release date: September 30
- The Winter. From 2001 (with Ishkan as Nowfolk)
  - Release date: October 28
- Martian Xmas 2016
  - Release date: November 29
- To the Next Season
  - Release date: December 25
