= Spacesuits (album) =

Studio album by Spacesuits
- Released: October 14, 2014
- Genre: Hip-hop
- Length: 34:02
- Label: Urbnet Records
- Producer: Jules Chaz

Spacesuits is a collaborative studio album, by Spacesuits, consisting of rappers LMNO, Moka Only and Mr. Brady, and producer Jules Chaz. It was released by Urbnet Records on October 14, 2014. Each rapper previously worked with Battle Axe Records.

The album reached number 2 on !earshot's hip-hop chart in December 2014 and January 2015. It ranked number 18 on their 2015 year-end hip-hop chart.

== Critical reception ==
Professional ratings
Review scores
Source	Rating
Exclaim	6/10
RapReviews	5.5/10

Thomas Quinlan of Exclaim! said Jules Chaz's production was the highlight of the album. He praised Moka's singing and Brady's "deeper, whispery voice", but criticized LMNO's simple lyrics and delivery. He stated "Spacesuits spend more time grounded on earthly subjects than on spacey things, the topic pretty much just braggadocio with random space references."

Steve Juon of RapReviews said the album is "an often purposefully discordant note of disharmony", with songs that "range from hypnotizing to off-putting". He concluded, "Nothing on Spacesuits is outrageously bad, but it’s too clever for its own good, and it's just not that fun to listen to."

Sally Bowles of Hotmc ranked it the fifth best album of 2014.

== Track listing ==
No.	Title	Length
1.	"Speedy"	2:04
2.	"Uncharted"	1:48
3.	"Meteor"	2:44
4.	"Rangers"	2:01
5.	"Float"	2:12
6.	"Nibiru"	1:46
7.	"Roots"	2:55
8.	"Crunch"	2:08
9.	"Chase"	2:23
10.	"Chicks"	2:12
11.	"Contact"	3:33
12.	"Lift Shift"	1:59
13.	"Rockabye"	1:55
14.	"Navigation"	1:56
15.	"Steps"	2:26
Total length:		34:02
