= Lowdown Suite =

Studio album by Moka Only
- Released: June 3, 2003
- Recorded: 2001–2003
- Genre: Hip-hop
- Length: 59:17
- Label: Battle Axe Records
- Producers: Moka Only; Chin Injeti

Moka Only chronology
Flood (2002)	Lowdown Suite (2003)	The Desired Effect (2005)

Lowdown Suite is a studio album by Canadian rapper, singer and producer Moka Only. It was released by Battle Axe Records on June 3, 2003. Aside from the Chin Injeti produced first track, the album was self-produced, and features one guest appearance from Ishkan. In 2004, the album was nominated for Western Canadian Music Awards Outstanding Rap/Hip-Hop Recording. In 2009, he released the sequel Lowdown Suite 2… The Box.

== Recording ==
Most of the album was recorded at Moka's home studio. However, the tracks "I'm a Nut" and "Rockin' It" were recorded at Hipposonic Studios, where the album was mixed. He played the Wurlitzer electronic piano on both Hipposonic songs, along with "Why You?", which he also played the trumpet.

"Why You?" was an alternate take of his song "Short Girls" from his group Nowfolk's 2002 album The Moon. "Why Waste Time" was recorded at his home studio after returning from the East Coast, where he and Swollen Members had issues with airport customs. Along with the three interludes, "Take It Slow" is also primarily an instrumental track. Recorded in the summer of 2001, it is the oldest recording to appear on the album. Moka described "Oh Gina" as a continuation of the song "Love Story" from his 1998 album Apenuts. He credited engineer Roger Swan for the "swimmy vocals" of "Livin' In A Dream". "Magnificent" was recorded with Ishkan on Boxing Day 2002, while on a tour break. "Finally Throo" was completed on the albums final day of mixing.

== Critical reception ==
Professional ratings
Review scores
Source	Rating
Dagensskiva	7/10 stars

Jason Thornberry of Alternative Zine noted "his self-effacing rhyme style, and warm soul singing". He compared him to Lionel Richie and claimed there were no poor tracks.

Ola Andersson of Dagensskiva said "on Lowdown Suite the step is really short to De La Soul's later albums" and called it "a meeting between classic East Coast beats and sun-drenched West Coast rap".

== Track listing ==
No.	Title	Length
1.	"Moon Burn" (produced by Chin Injeti)	3:30
2.	"Why You?"	3:34
3.	"Lowdown Suite"	3:28
4.	"Interlude I"	0:27
5.	"I'm A Nut"	3:18
6.	"Why Waste Time"	3:27
7.	"So Special"	2:45
8.	"Interlude II"	0:42
9.	"Rockin' It"	2:23
10.	"Take It Slow"	2:34
11.	"Oh Gina"	3:33
12.	"Livin' In A Dream"	4:50
13.	"Interlude III"	0:33
14.	"What I Do"	3:40
15.	"Way 2 Warm"	3:34
16.	"Magnificent" (featuring Ishkan)	3:55
17.	"Love Comes"	3:16
18.	"Finally Throo"	* 9:48
Total length:		59:17

- "Finally Throo" ends at 3:47, Hidden track plays at 4:41
