= Eat Your Heart Out (album) =

Studio album by Potatohead People
- Released: May 10, 2024
- Genres: Hip-hop; instrumental hip-hop
- Length: 43:46
- Label: Bastard Jazz Recordings
- Producer: Potatohead People

Potatohead People chronology
Mellow Fantasy (2020)	Eat Your Heart Out (2024)	Emerald Tablet (with Slippery Elm) (2025)

Eat Your Heart Out is the fourth studio album by Canadian production duo Potatohead People (Nick Wisdom and Nate Drobner). The album was released on May 10, 2024 by Bastard Jazz Recordings. It features guest appearances from Kendra Dias, Redman, Shafiq Husayn, Ivan Ave, Kapok, Abstract Rude, T3, Diamond Cafe, Frank Nitt, Reggie B, Moka Only.

== Track listing ==
All tracks produced by Nick Wisdom and Nate Drobner

No.	Title	Length
1.	"The Formula"	2:56
2.	"Keepin' It Kool" (featuring Kendra Dias)	5:25
3.	"Last Nite" (featuring Redman)	3:41
4.	"Angelwings" (featuring Shafiq Husayn and Ivan Ave)	3:42
5.	"Distant Luv" (featuring Kapok)	4:24
6.	"Follow Your Heart"	5:05
7.	"Come Home" (featuring Abstract Rude, T3 and Kapok)	4:16
8.	"Paradise" (featuring Diamond Cafe)	4:23
9.	"Secret Mission" (featuring Frank Nitt and Reggie B)	3:37
10.	"Everything U Need" (featuring Kendra Dias)	3:22
11.	"For the Soul" (featuring Moka Only)	2:55
Total length:		43:46
