= Ishkan =

Canadian rapper

- Also known as: Kanny Bananas
- Born: Adrian Cree
- Origin: Vancouver, British Columbia, Canada
- Genre: Hip-hop
- Occupations: Rapper; songwriter
- Years active: 1995–present
- Formerly of: Nowfolk; The Current

Adrian Cree, better known by his stage name Ishkan, is a Canadian rapper from Vancouver, British Columbia.

== Career ==
In the late 1990s to early 2000s, he was in the collective City Planners with producers Sichuan and Sweet G, and rappers Jeff Spec and Moka Only. The crew was later named in Urb Magazine's "The Next 100". He paired with Moka Only to create Nowfolk, releasing Style Gangstas in 1999, followed by The Moon in 2002.

In 2014 he was featured on the Sonic Generals song "Down To Business", which appeared in the film Hackney's Finest. In 2015, he joined a new collective Torchlight Commission with A-Ro, Illa J, Jeff Spec, Jon Rogers, Jules Chaz, Moka Only, LMNO, Mosiac, Mr. Brady, and Potatohead People. In 2016 Nowfolk released two albums, Magnesium Opium and The Winter From 2001. The recordings were recovered from Moka's ADAT system, which was damaged in June 2003. In 2024, Nowfolk digitally released and reissued CDs of The Moon, marking its first availability since the original CD copies went out of print in 2004.

== Discography ==
=== Albums ===
- Wrecktangular (self-released, 1997)
- Bent Twisted and Gnarled (self-released, 1999)
- Cousin Coolout (City Planners Music, 2000)
- The Rapper Writs (produced by Sweet G) (Legendary Entertainment, 2001)
- Murder Mouth (Eclipse Records, 2005)
- Two Lights (produced by Aleph 1ne) (Cold Residents, 2012)

Nowfolk (with Moka Only)

- Style Gangstas (Mammal Music, 1999)
- The Moon (Perilunar, 2002)
- The Winter. From 2001 (Urbnet Records, 2016)
- Magnesium Opium (Urbnet, 2016)

The Current (with DJ Murge, Ashleigh Eymann and Just B)

- Breakdown, Breakthrough (Eclipse, 2006)
- The Current (Wolf Sheep Records, 2014)

=== Guest appearances ===
- "Upcoast" from Upcoast Relix by Moka Only (1995)
- "Catch a Pass" and "Electrik M. Drivers" from Dusty Bumps by Moka Only (1996)
- "Way Out" and "Session At Squants" from Durable Mammal by Moka Only (1997)
- "Even" from Fall Collection 97 by Moka Only (1997)
- "The Three X's" from Cock Dynamiks: Sensual Canadian Hip-Hop by Various Artists (1997)
- "Many Session Excerps 95-98" from Monsterpiece by Moka Only (1998)
- "Fiendish" from Soul Slaw by Syncopated Cabbages (Jeff Spec and Jedi Jihad) (1998)
- "Talpidae Ad." and "Apex" from It's Simple by Jeff Spec (1999)
- "More!" from Mount Unpleasant by Moka Only (1999)
- "Good Times Stack" from Road Life by Moka Only (2000)
- "Push It Along", "That's Why We Always Do the Things We Do", "Turn Me Loose", "I'll Be In the Crowd" and "Take a Minute" from Flowtorch by Moka Only (2000)
- "Easy On" from Fort Knock by Jeff Spec (2000)
- "We Caught You" and "Time Again" from Thousand Sense by Intellect (2001)
- "We Caught You Pt. 2" and "Complex Promo" from The Regular by Jeff Spec (2001)
- "Off My Lightah" and "Walk With Us" from Rappin' Atchu by The Rappers (Jeff Spec and Moka Only) (2001)
- "Sickenin' Heights" from Instrumental Floss by Sichuan (2001)
- "Don't Chu" and "Nocturnal" from Longtime Thinkin' by Electrik O (2001)
- "Up Your Pulse" from Dark City by Jeff Spec (2002)
- "S.C.P." and "Where I've Been" from Search and Rescue by DJ Murge (2002)
- "Getting Tight" from Until It Ends by Insides Out (DJ Murge and Just B) (2002)
- "Take It In" from Flood by Moka Only (2002)
- "Magnificent" from Lowdown Suite by Moka Only (2003)
- "Soundwaves" from The Scenic Route by Oddities (2003)
- "Head to Head" from Wicked! by Lester (2003)
- "Connect 4", "Fast Again", "Expand" and "It's That" from Middle Ground Rational by Just B (2004)
- "Sometimes" and "There's a Story" from Spy vs. Spy by PudFluff and Kavawon (2005)
- "Get In Where You Fit In", "Ishkan Exclusive" and "Never Can Say Goodbye Pt. 2" from The Last Shall Be First Vol. One by Jeff Spec (2005)
- "The Two" from Rhythm and Blues by Jeff Spec (2006)
- "On Our Way" from Westlake: Class of 1999 by Gabriel Teodros (2006)
- "Fun" from Starr: The Comtemplations of a Dominator by Kirby Dominant (2006)
- "Zing Zing" from Creepee Eepee by Moka Only (2007)
- "Eneff" from Carrots and Eggs by Moka Only (2008)
- "Sleep Alright" from My Dusty Finger Tips by Guy Woods (2009)
- "Nopefolk Goh" from Melba by The Nope (Moka Only and Psy) (2009)
- "Go Get It" from Left Overs by The Scale Breakers (2010)
- "Illumination" from The Illuminaugi by Langdon Auger (2011)
- "Can't Quit" from #Autonomy by Bukue One (2012)
- "Dam Thing Funny" from Specnology by Jeff Spec (2014)
- "Voice An Opinion" from The Voodoo Suite Sessions, Vol. 1 by Mamma Freedom (2014)
- "Not Possible" from California Sessions, Vol. 2 by Moka Only (2015)
- "Where It Comes From" from Heartbeats by Justin Brave (2017)
- "Simple Dream" from Malkin Jackson: Summerland by Moka Only (2016)
- "With My Hands" and "Stay" from Dayo by Dayo (2017)
- "Stronger" from The Collabs 01 by pnwrk and Jeff Spec (2020)
