= I'm Delighted =

Studio album by Moka Only
- Released: May 27, 2016
- Genre: Instrumental hip-hop
- Length: 37:05
- Label: Urbnet Records
- Producer: Moka Only

Moka Only chronology
Re-Bent Twisted and Gnarled (2016)	I'm Delighted (2016)	Malkin Jackson: Summerland (2016)

I'm Delighted is an instrumental studio album by Canadian producer Moka Only. It was released by Urbnet Records on May 27, 2016, the fifth release of his #12albumsFor2016 series. It reached number 15 on !earshot's hip-hop chart in August 2016.

== Critical reception ==
Professional ratings
Review scores
Source	Rating
Exclaim!	4/10
RapReviews	7/10

Chris Dart of Exclaim! expressed that the album felt unfinished, stating "The problem isn't that I'm Delighted is bad, but that it feels like a rough sketch."

Steve Juon of RapReviews compared Moka's production to J Dilla, as well as No I.D. on "Hup Hup" and Soul Assassins on "For the Payyy". He criticized the short song length and said the album was "a chill way to pass the time, though not a profound or life-changing one".

== Track listing ==
No.	Title	Length
1.	"Delightro"	1:26
2.	"Filterbox"	1:36
3.	"Hup Hup"	1:20
4.	"Beez"	1:16
5.	"Go"	1:09
6.	"Are You Present"	1:28
7.	"For the Payyy"	1:22
8.	"Everybody Knows"	1:00
9.	"Should We Write"	1:36
10.	"Penticton"	0:58
11.	"Anja"	1:28
12.	"Creamy Jam"	1:29
13.	"Definitely On Some"	1:34
14.	"Aurora"	0:57
15.	"Going In"	1:22
16.	"True Googz"	1:15
17.	"Gotta Automate"	1:06
18.	"Boggles"	1:58
19.	"Mopin"	0:55
20.	"What Da Fuck"	1:19
21.	"Sliding"	1:41
22.	"Peenanno"	1:24
23.	"Right…"	1:10
24.	"Chiming"	0:57
25.	"Fanta"	0:58
26.	"Sunny Bap"	0:42
27.	"… I Can See"	1:20
28.	"Rat Race"	1:09
29.	"Bellhowse"	1:10
Total length:		37:05
