= Hipposonic Studios =

Recording studio in Vancouver, Canada

HippoSonic Studios is a music recording studio in Vancouver, British Columbia, Canada. It was founded in 1989 by Robert Darch.

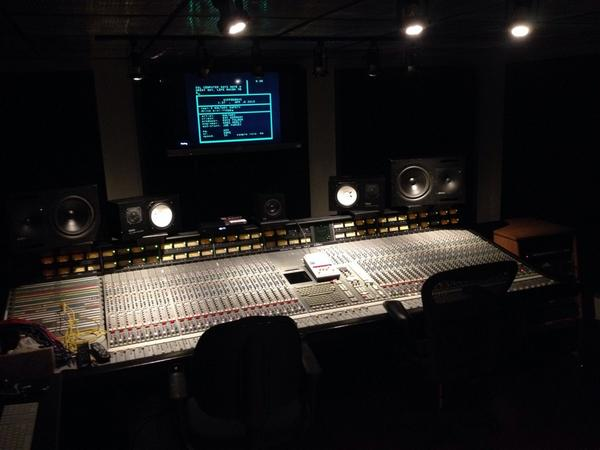
Mixing desk SSL 4048G+ at Vancouver Hipposonic Recording Studio. Manufactured in 1995 with custom "Black" EQ's.

The studio houses one mixing, recording and overdubbing room with a Solid State Logic 4000G+ Series. Over the years Hipposonic has had a wide variety of clients, Canadian and international, including Tom Cochrane, Bif Naked, James Brown, Delerium, Prism, Selena Gomez, Jenna Andrews, Econoline Crush, Mother Mother, Skinny Puppy, K-Os, Kinnie Starr, Lamb of God, Swollen Members, Wu-Tang Clan, Kiss, Gob, Strapping Young Lad, Colin Linden, Bobby Curtola, Colin James, Sarah Harmer, Hannah Georgas, Boom Desjardins, Marianas Trench, Macy Gray, Daniel Wesley, Rammstein, One Bad Son, Moist, Incura, Tegan and Sara, Hey Ocean Hedley, Louise Burns, 5440, Jakalope, Front Line Assembly, Black Mountain, The Mars Volta, The Be Good Tanyas, and Serena Ryder among others.

Hipposonic relocated in January 2017 to a new address at 201 West 7th Avenue, Vancouver, British Columbia Canada, the former home of Little Mountain Sound Studios.
