= LMNO (musician) =

American rapper and record producer

- Born: James Kelly; May 19, 1974 (age 52); Long Beach, California
- Origin: Los Angeles, California
- Genre: Hip-hop
- Occupations: Rapper; songwriter; record producer
- Years active: 1998–present
- Labels: Up Above; Battle Axe; Urbnet
- Member of: Visionaries
- Formerly of: LMD; Spacesuits

Logo

James Kelly, better known by his stage name LMNO (an acronym for Leave My Name Out), is an American rapper and record producer from Long Beach, California. He is a member of the Los Angeles based group Visionaries.

== Career ==
He began his career in the late 1990's with The Visionaries. In 2001, he released his debut album titled Leave My Name Out on Battle Axe and Up Above Records. He continued working with Up Above Records throughout the 2000's. In 2010 he released ten albums, including joint projects with frequent collaborators Kev Brown, Mr. Brady and fellow Visionaries member, 2Mex. In 2013 he released After the Fact, produced by Evidence. In 2014, he released the group album Spacesuits with Jules Chaz, Moka Only and Mr. Brady on Urbnet Records. In 2015, he joined the collective Torchlight Commission with A-Ro, Illa J, Ishkan, Jeff Spec, Jon Rogers, Jules Chaz, Moka Only, Mosiac, Mr. Brady, and Potatohead People. In 2022, he released the album Flying High with Madlib, Declaime and M.E.D. under the group name LMD.

== Discography ==
=== Solo albums ===
- Leave My Name Out (2001)
- Economic Food Chain Music (2004)
- P's & Q's (2005)
- Work Ethic (2007)
- Let Em Know (2009)
- Devilish Dandruff with Holy Shampoo (2009)
- Push That Work (2010)
- Fonk Garden (2010)
- Next in Line (2010)
- Determined to Fly (2010)
- Tripping On This Journey (2010)
- No Apologies (2010)
- LMNO is Dead (2010)
- Overtime (2011)
- Preparanoia (2014)
- Motherboard (2016)
- 10:20 (2020)

=== Collaboration albums ===
- Collision (with Mum's the Word) (2003)
- Selective Hearing (with Kev Brown) (2008)
- Selective Hearing Part 2 (with Kev Brown) (2010)
- Banger Management (with Mr. Brady) (2010)
- Blessing in Disguise (with KeyKool & 2Mex) (2010)
- Born Again (with Kyo Itachi) (2011)
- It All Adds Up (with Soulution) (2012)
- After the Fact (with Evidence) (2013)
- Spacesuits (with Jules Chaz, Moka Only and Mr. Brady as Spacesuits) (2014)
- 25/8 (with Mr. Brady) (2015)
- Bronze Age (with Flavor Caprice) (2015)
- Cohorts (with Twiz the Beat Pro) (2017)
- Flying High (with Madlib, M.E.D., and Declaime as LMD) (2022)
- Humble Is The Style (with 2Mex) (2024)
- Caught in the Moment (with Mr. Brady and Gfear) (2025)
- Three Mimes & An Elephant (with D-Styles) (2025)
