= Jeff Spec =

Canadian rapper and record producer

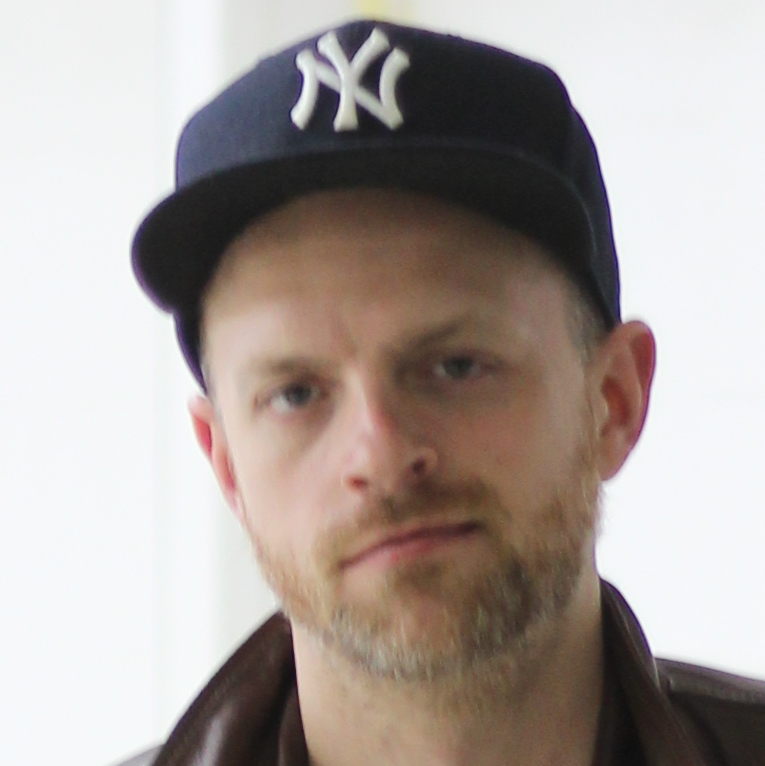
- Jeff Spec in 2014

Background information
- Also known as: Intellect; That Bastard Jeff
- Born: Chris Novakoski
- Origin: Vancouver, British Columbia, Canada
- Genre: Hip-hop
- Occupations: Rapper; songwriter; record producer
- Years active: 1998–present
- Formerly of: Foolish Immortals; The Rappers; Soviets; Syncopated Cabbages

Chris Novakoski, better known by his stage name Jeff Spec, is a Canadian rapper and record producer from Vancouver, British Columbia.

== Career ==
In the late 1990s to early 2000s, he was in the collective City Planners with producers Sichuan and Sweet G, and rappers Ishkan and Moka Only. In 2001, the crew was named in Urb Magazine's "The Next 100". He was named in AllHipHop's list of "Top 25 Underground Artists of 2011". In 2015, he joined a new collective Torchlight Commission with A-Ro, Illa J, Ishkan, Jon Rogers, Jules Chaz, Moka Only, LMNO, Mosiac, Mr. Brady, and Potatohead People.

== Discography ==
=== Solo albums ===
- It's Simple (Legendary Entertainment, 1999)
- Fort Knock (Legendary Entertainment, 2000)
- Thousand Sense (as Intellect) (Legendary Entertainment, 2001)
- The Regular (Legendary Entertainment, 2001)
- Dark City (Day by Day Entertainment, 2002)
- The Last Shall Be First Vol. One (self-released, 2005)
- Rhythm and Blues (Avery Records, 2006)
- "... a little night music" (self-released, 2007)
- Sneakerboxxx (Pushin' Records, 2010)
- Specnology (self-released, 2011)
- Freeze (Wandering Worx, 2012)
- 52 Pick Up (Weekly Series) (The Mad Bloggers Music, 2014)
- Fall Blend 2014 (self-released, 2014)
- Sperience (self-released, 2014)

=== Collaboration albums ===
- Soul Slaw (as Syncopated Cabbages with Jedi Jihad) (self-released, 1998)
- Rappetite (as Intellect with Unik) (Legendary Entertainment, 2001)
- The Thing With Two Heads (with Sichuan) (Legendary Entertainment, 2001)
- Rappin' Atchu (as The Rappers with Moka Only) (Legendary Entertainment, 2001)
- Motion Picture (with Sichuan) (self-released, 2006)
- It's Been a Long Time (with Engineer) (Pushin' Records, 2009)
- Sea Shells (as Soviets with Chaix) (Urbnet Records, 2019)
- All In (with The Quarter Inch Kings) (Opportunity Knocks, 2019)
- Illustration (as Foolish Immortals with Birdapres) (Black Buffalo Records, 2021)
- Ghetto Laundry (with pnwrk) (self-released, 2023)
- The Collabs 01 (with pnwrk) (self-released, 2024)
- Tropico (as Soviets with Chaix) (Blue Lady, 2025)
