= Lowdown Suite 2… The Box =

Lowdown Suite 2... The Box

Studio album by Moka Only
- Released: May 19, 2009
- Recorded: 2004–2009
- Genre: Hip-hop
- Length: 44:29
- Label: Feelin' Music
- Producers: Moka Only; Chief

Moka Only chronology
Airport 3 (2009)	Lowdown Suite 2... The Box (2009)	Martian XMAS 2009 (2009)

Lowdown Suite 2... The Box is a studio album by Canadian rapper, singer and producer Moka Only. It was released by Chief's label, Feelin' Music on May 19, 2009. Aside from the Chief produced first track, the album was self-produced, and features guest appearances from Bootie Brown, Kissey Asplund, and Psy. It is the sequel of his 2003 album Lowdown Suite.

On May 12, 2009, he released the Do Work EP, which includes the album version of "Do Work", a remix, and two non-album tracks. On May 14, 2010, he released the Isn't Over EP, with the album version of "Isn't Over", 2 remixes, and 4 non-album tracks.

== Recording ==
The album began under the title Lead Kicks, then was re-worked as the release title. It includes tracks recorded from 2004 to the albums release, some of which were originally intended for unreleased albums Summer Summary ("Syrup", "Stained", "Clap Yer Feet", "Boohoo") and Way West ("Riverside"). It also includes a remix of "Hardly Say" from Carrots and Eggs. Moka plays trumpet on the song "Drip Drop". "Trudgin" is an instrumental track and samples Ice Cube. He wrote "Riverside" at the Fraser River and produced the song upon returning to his home studio.

== Critical reception ==
Professional ratings
Review scores
Source	Rating
HipHopCore	4/5 stars
RapReviews	6.5/10

Chris Dart of Exclaim! praised the production of the tracks "Fried Rice" and "Rock the Yacht". He said "As a rapper, Moka takes his drawling, elastic flow and makes it sound at home on any topic, whether he's voicing his frustrations as a still-struggling artist or teaching life lessons. As a singer, Moka makes up for his lack of polish with a charming vocal style".

HipHopCore said the album was "universally accessible from the first listening" and noted "the atmospheres of the eighteen songs on the album, no matter how different they are, follow one another without dissonance or missteps." He concluded, the album "enjoys the ability to be devoid of false pretensions without ever being boring or predictable".

Matt Jost of RapReviews characterized the album as "unorganized, patchy, dreamy, but nevertheless determined". He claimed "while the structure of his music is unconventional, it’s never purely abstract or too far away from the historic pillars of the genre." However he criticized the collaborative tracks, expressing "Even when he invites guests, the only tangible interaction happens between Moka's voice and his beats, both of which, don't always possess the strongest of motivations".

== Track listing ==
No.	Title	Length
1.	"Do Work" (produced by Chief)	2:59
2.	"Hardly Say [Remix]" (featuring Bootie Brown)	2:36
3.	"Syrup"	1:23
4.	"Lemon"	2:18
5.	"Fried Rice"	2:35
6.	"Stained"	2:43
7.	"Drip Drop" (featuring Kissey Asplund)	2:32
8.	"Funky" (featuring Psy)	2:27
9.	"Clap Yer Feet"	3:46
10.	"Boohoo"	2:48
11.	"Mothballs"	2:20
12.	"Trudgin"	2:45
13.	"Isn't Over"	2:37
14.	"It's Lowdown"	2:30
15.	"Bored" (featuring Psy)	2:19
16.	"Riverside"	1:44
17.	"Be Alright"	2:09
18.	"Rock The Yacht"	1:58
Total length:		44:29
