= Vermilion (Moka Only album) =

Studio album by Moka Only
- Released: April 24, 2007
- Recorded: 2004–06
- Studio: The Dusty Den of Assorted Keys
- Genre: Hip-hop
- Length: 51:34
- Label: Urbnet Records
- Producer: Moka Only

Moka Only chronology
Airport (2007)	Vermilion (2007)	Dog River (with Def3) (2007)

Vermilion is a studio album by Canadian rapper, singer and producer Moka Only. It was released by Urbnet Records on April 24, 2007. The album was entirely self-produced.

The album reached number 1 on Chart Attack and !earshot hip-hop charts in June 2007. It ranked number 7 on !earshot's year-end hip-hop chart. Three music videos were released in 2008, for the songs "Search", "Do", and "Raise the Bar". Also in 2008, the album was nominated for Western Canadian Music Awards Outstanding Urban Recording. In 2018, Vermilion was reissued as part of a 3 cassette collection with Clap Trap and Carrots and Eggs.

== Recording ==
The album includes tracks that were originally intended for his 2005 album The Desired Effect ("God Bless", "When… ?", "Shake Dat Neck", "Shoofly"), as well as an unreleased album titled Hibernaculum, and additional tracks recorded in 2006. "So Kona" refers to Hawaii, recorded after he spent a week there. The album also contains a hidden track, which is a cover of "Head over Heels" by Tears for Fears.

== Critical reception ==
Professional ratings
Review scores
Source	Rating
Now	5/5 Ns
Okayplayer	3.5/5 stars
PopMatters	7/10
RapReviews	7.5/10
Urb	3.5/5 stars

Thomas Quinlan of Exclaim! noted "Moka returns to his roots with a greater concentration of samples and raps rather than keyboards, synths and singing. Sure, there's still feel good tracks, but Vermilion contains more anger and venom than usual."

Now called it "arguably his best album", saying "the soul-drenched vocals jump and skip all over his bright self-produced funky and jazzy concoctions the topics are kept light and lovely."

Steve Hammer of Okayplayer said "Moka Only sounds casual on the mic, but still delivers his intricate rhymes with plenty of authority." He praised the album's production, though he claimed it "sounds like one big J Dilla impersonation".

Mike Schiller of PopMatters said "Despite the ever-changing subject matter, Vermilion maintains a consistent sound throughout, and while Moka may not be the flashiest or most charismatic rapper around, he’s always on beat and his rhymes are always tight."

Matt Jost of RapReviews described the album as "eccentric and reclusive, a colorful kaleidoscope of playful melodies and strong rhythms", and noted "the diversity lies in the details, as once you zoom out and contemplate Vermilion as a whole, it is not a patchwork, but a richly embroidered fabric, one unifying element being the fine layer of static that covers many beats, another the warm, rich sound, and a third Moka’s relaxed flow."

== Track listing ==
No.	Title	Length
1.	"Intro"	1:17
2.	"Do"	2:03
3.	"God Bless"	2:19
4.	"I Could Give A..."	2:43
5.	"So Kona"	3:00
6.	"Search"	2:55
7.	"Vermilion"	2:37
8.	"When... ?"	3:09
9.	"Let Me Down"	2:40
10.	"Banana Pancakes"	1:54
11.	"Hibiscus"	3:20
12.	"The Taste"	2:29
13.	"Cheeka Cheeka"	2:08
14.	"Shake Dat Neck"	3:15
15.	"Raise the Bar"	1:59
16.	"Shoofly"	3:30
17.	"Ice Cream"	2:54
18.	"Speakers"	* 7:32
Total length:		51:34

- "Speakers" ends at 2:58, Hidden track plays at 3:28
