= Sex Money Moka =

Studio album by Moka Only
- Released: May 13, 2014
- Genre: Hip-hop
- Length: 53:23
- Label: Urbnet Records
- Producers: Moka Only; Jon Rogers

Moka Only chronology
Martian XMAS 2013 (2013)	Sex Money Moka (2014)	Martian XMAS 2014 (2014)

Sex Money Moka is a studio album by Canadian rapper, singer and producer Moka Only. It was released by Urbnet Records on May 13, 2014. Aside from the Jon Rogers produced first track, the album was self-produced, and features guest appearances from Jon Rogers, LMNO, Mr. Brady, Korry Deez, and Dave PSY.

Four music videos were released, for the songs "Always Happy", "What Would Happen", "It's Best", and "Inside My Heart". The album reached number 3 on !earshot's hip-hop chart in June and August 2014. It ranked number 4 on their year-end hip-hop chart. The album also ranked number 2 on CJLO's 2014 year-end chart and number 10 on their top releases of the 2010-2019 decade. In October and November 2014, he toured the album through Eastern Canada. In 2015, the album was nominated for Western Canadian Music Awards Rap/Hip-Hop Recording of the Year.

== Critical reception ==
Professional ratings
Review scores
Source	Rating
Exclaim!	7/10
RapReviews	8/10

Kevin Jones of Exclaim! praised Moka's consistency and noted the album's "hypnotic rhythms, muted bass tones and chopped guitar accents of Dilla-era Common and Slum Village"

Steve Juon of RapReviews noted the album's "jazzy and playfully sexual" style and called it "a throwback to that early 1990's era of rap in many respects". He stated "There's a breezy Native Tongues mellow vibe to songs like "Inside My Heart," "Flying" and "You Won't Get Much Higher".

Brian Döc Holidæ of CJLO ranked it the sixth best hip-hop release of 2014 and named "Go Mellow" his favorite track.

"Go Mellow" was included in CD Baby's 20th anniversary playlist, named by Rebecca Helgeson as her favorite song by a CD Baby artist.

== Track listing ==
No.	Title	Length
1.	"Daybreak" (producer, featuring Jon Rogers)	2:17
2.	"Sunshine and Cakes"	3:08
3.	"For Me"	2:33
4.	"Love and Happiness" (featuring LMNO)	2:44
5.	"Go Mellow"	2:51
6.	"I Wanna"	2:28
7.	"Inside My Heart"	3:16
8.	"Its Best"	2:49
9.	"Tryna Be Fly"	3:00
10.	"Rolla Nugg" (featuring Mr. Brady)	2:22
11.	"Flying"	3:30
12.	"Blender"	3:02
13.	"Always Happy"	3:08
14.	"What Would Happen"	2:29
15.	"You Won’t Get Much Higher"	3:15
16.	"Rhyme Is Wow" (featuring Korry Deez)	2:22
17.	"So Much ta Go On" (featuring Dave PSY)	2:17
18.	"Mysterious" (featuring Jon Rogers)	2:16
19.	"I’m Coming On the World"	3:36
Total length:		53:23
