= Airport 6 =

Studio album by Moka Only
- Released: September 18, 2012
- Genre: Hip-hop
- Length: 34:39
- Label: Urbnet Records
- Producer: Moka Only

Moka Only chronology
Bridges (with Ayatollah) (2012)	Airport 6 (2012)	Martian XMAS 2012 (2012)

Singles from Airport 6
- 1. "Like That" Released: September 18, 2012

Airport 6 is a studio album by Canadian rapper, singer and producer Moka Only. It was released by Urbnet Records on September 18, 2012. The album was entirely self-produced, and features one guest appearance from Plug 2. It is the final album of his Airport series.

Three music videos were released, for the songs "Sleeping Dogs", "I'm In Space" and "The Tighten Up". The video for "Sleeping Dogs", directed by mcenroe, includes a gallery with photos of Moka dating back to the early 1990s.

The album reached number 1 on !earshot's hip-hop chart in October and November 2012. It ranked number 9 on their year-end hip-hop chart. The album also ranked number 13 on CJSR-FM's 2012 year-end hip-hop chart. In 2013, the album was nominated for Western Canadian Music Awards Rap/Hip-Hop Recording of the Year.

== Critical reception ==
Professional ratings
Review scores
Source	Rating
Scratched Vinyl	8/10

Thomas Quinlan of Exclaim! stated "Moka's lo-fi production is jazzy hip-hop, light on bass, his flow is laidback and chilled out, and his hooks are primarily self-sung, making for a mellow mood" and named "To Keep Us Rollin" as the highlight of the album.

Kamir Hiam of The Find claimed "Airport 6 could be one of his best works yet. At the very least, this LP shoots in to my top 10 rap releases of the year."

Chi Chi Talken of Scratched Vinyl said "Moka's production is incredibly warm and intimate, while also retaining a certain playfulness that makes the album immediately accessible. On top of this great production work, Moka delivers some of his best lyrical work as well."

DJ Remission of CJLO ranked it one of the top five Canadian hip-hop albums of 2012.

== Track listing ==
No.	Title	Length
1.	"Sleeping Dogs"	3:32
2.	"Ain't Broken"	3:23
3.	"Back Back"	2:44
4.	"The Tighten Up"	2:56
5.	"Resistance"	2:42
6.	"I'm in Space"	2:24
7.	"Mr. Megahustle" (featuring Plug 2)	3:03
8.	"Still Gotcha"	2:54
9.	"So Phenomenal"	2:51
10.	"Like That"	2:55
11.	"Goin' Down"	2:18
12.	"To Keep Us Rollin"	2:57
Total length:		34:39
