= In and of Itself =

Studio album by Moka Only
- Released: May 19, 2023
- Recorded: Spring 2021
- Genre: Hip-hop
- Length: 41:19
- Label: Urbnet Records
- Producer: Moka Only

Moka Only chronology
Martian XMAS 2022 (2022)	In and of Itself (2023)	Spooky Beats n' Other Treats (2023)

Singles from In and of Itself
- 1. "Naturally" Released: April 7, 2023; 2. "Tablecloth" Released: April 28, 2023

In and of Itself is a studio album by Canadian rapper, singer and producer Moka Only. It was released by Urbnet Records on May 19, 2023. The album was entirely self-produced, and the cover art was illustrated by Moka Only. The album reached number 10 on !earshot's hip-hop chart in July 2023. An instrumental version was released on September 15, 2023.

== Critical reception ==
Professional ratings
Review scores
Source	Rating
Scratched Vinyl	8/10
Tom Hull – on the Web	B+

Michael Gonik of Okayplayer praised the album's "airtight flows" and "dusty beats".

Hip Hop Golden Age said the album "seamlessly combines his smooth flows with dusty beats". They ranked the album number 5 in their May 2023 roundup: best hip-hop albums of the month and number 55 in their list of the best hip-hop albums of 2023.

Chi Chi Talken of Scratched Vinyl noted the album's "playful rhymes" and "laid back and smooth delivery" and stated "The beats are nice and warm and just put you at ease, and Moka has plenty of charisma and wordplay to keep you engaged across the album."

== Track listing ==
No.	Title	Length
1.	"Restart"	3:02
2.	"Tablecloth"	2:52
3.	"Take a Whiff"	3:06
4.	"Do with Myself"	2:43
5.	"Just for the Night"	1:51
6.	"I Do Rap"	2:31
7.	"Double RL"	2:59
8.	"Don't U Kno"	3:00
9.	"Oh Thousands"	1:01
10.	"Naturally"	2:40
11.	"Don't Approach"	2:02
12.	"Walkabout"	2:21
13.	"Willington Interlude"	0:36
14.	"More Doing This"	2:21
15.	"How Boring Do You Like It"	3:06
16.	"Need to Do"	2:32
17.	"Drainpipe"	2:43
Total length:		41:19
