= Insular =

Insular is an adjective used to describe:

- An island
- Someone who is isolated and parochial

Insular may also refer to:

== Sub-national territories or regions ==
- Insular Chile
- Insular region of Colombia
- Insular Ecuador, administratively known as Galápagos Province
- Insular Region (Equatorial Guinea)
- Insular Italy
- Insular Portugal, comprises the Madeira and Azores Autonomous Regions
- Insular Southeast Asia
- Insular areas of the United States
  - Insular Cases, a series of U.S. Supreme Court decisions in 1901, about the status of U.S. territories acquired in the Spanish–American War
  - Bureau of Insular Affairs, a unit of the U.S. government's War Department which administered certain insular areas from 1902 to 1939
  - Office of Insular Affairs, a unit of the U.S. Department of the Interior that oversees federal administration of several insular areas (and the successor to the Bureau of Insular Affairs).
  - Insular Government of the Philippine Islands, the U.S. territorial government that was established in 1901 and was dissolved in 1935
- Insular Region, Venezuela

== Periods of political isolation ==
- Berlin, while isolated by the Berlin Wall, from 1961 to 1989
- China, after 1422 until the 19th century
- Japan, during most of the Tokugawa shogunate (1603–1868), when the Seclusion laws were in place
- South Africa during apartheid, between 1948 and 1993

== Other uses ==
- "Insular", a song by Moka Only from the albums Clap Trap, 2008; and Carrots and Eggs, 2008
- Insular (Insulares), the term used for criollos in the former Spanish East Indies (the Philippines, the Mariana Islands, the Caroline Islands)
- Insular art, the style of art produced in the post-Roman history of the British Isles
- Insular Celts, the Iron Age inhabitants of the British Isles
- Insular Celtic languages, the group of languages spoken by those people
- Insular Christianity, more commonly known as Celtic Christianity
- insular cortex, a part of the cerebral cortex
- Insular dwarfism, a form of phyletic dwarfism
- Insular script, a medieval script system originally used in Ireland
- Insular Life, a mutual life insurance company in the Philippines

== See also ==
- Maritime (disambiguation)
