= The Station Agent (album) =

Studio album by Moka Only
- Released: October 24, 2006
- Genres: Hip-hop; instrumental hip-hop
- Length: 42:07 • Digital; 47:54 • CD
- Label: Camobear Records
- Producer: Moka Only

Moka Only chronology
| Desired Effect (2006) | The Station Agent (2006) | Martian Xmas 2004 (2007) |

Professional ratings
Review scores
| Source | Rating |
|---|---|
| Exclaim! | (positive) |

The Station Agent is a studio album by Canadian rapper, singer and producer Moka Only (also known as Torch). It was released by Josh Martinez's label, Camobear Records on October 24, 2006. The album was entirely self-produced, and features two guest appearances, both from Psy.

While some tracks include vocals, the album consists primarily of instrumentals. One music video was released, for "Istics / Budd Break". The album reached number 6 on Chart Attack's hip-hop chart on December 15, 2006, and number 10 on !earshot's hip-hop chart in January 2007.

== Track listing ==
| No. | Title | Length |
|---|---|---|
| 1. | "Dintro / Sunlite Filter" | 2:31 |
| 2. | "Rumpa-Pum / Company for the Pum" | 2:17 |
| 3. | "Creatures Never Dance" | 1:19 |
| 4. | "The Donut House (For J. Yancey)" | 1:23 |
| 5. | "Ask Me Why / Ended for Me" | 2:04 |
| 6. | "God Got My Back" | 1:48 |
| 7. | "Quik Six / Upward Spiral" | 1:11 |
| 8. | "Just When I Think We There" | 1:44 |
| 9. | "Opium Groove" | 0:31 |
| 10. | "The Damn Summer / From the Grain" | 2:08 |
| 11. | "Behind the Piano Gates" | 1:05 |
| 12. | "Its a Drag / Um Um Uh" | 1:08 |
| 13. | "Dirty Lil' Box / Outside the Box" | 1:35 |
| 14. | "U Should Heart U / Psy Is Odd" (featuring Psy) | 2:17 |
| 15. | "All the Latest Bells and Whistles" | 1:36 |
| 16. | "See Ya At the Top With Ease" | 1:12 |
| 17. | "Istics / Budd Break" | 2:09 |
| 18. | "Begin Again (Pieces of Toast)" | 1:41 |
| 19. | "Sounds Like Advice" | 0:36 |
| 20. | "Shuffle (In The Leaves) / Wouldnt Be Nothin'" | 2:29 |
| 21. | "Stationhouse Blues / Skyrocket" | 1:36 |
| 22. | "Thats What It Is" | 1:48 |
| 23. | "Laundry (Downy Keeps It Soft)" | 1:04 |
| 24. | "Whispering David" (featuring Psy) | 1:18 |
| 25. | "Face It, It's Over" | 0:51 |
| 26. | "Shove (AKA The Song That Doesnt Belong Here)" | 2:46 |
| Total length: | | 42:07 |

CD bonus tracks
| No. | Title | Length |
|---|---|---|
| 27. | "Flip" | 2:14 |
| 28. | "Flop" | 1:19 |
| 29. | "Fly" | 1:14 |
| Total length: | | 47:54 |
