= Magickal Weirdness =

Studio album by Moka Only
- Released: July 17, 2015
- Genre: Hip-hop
- Length: 56:45
- Labels: Urbnet Records; Beautiful Records
- Producer: Moka Only

Moka Only chronology
Chicken Wingz (2015)	Magickal Weirdness (2015)	Martian XMAS 2015 (2015)

Singles from Magickal Weirdness
- 1. "No" Released: March 24, 2015

Magickal Weirdness is a studio album by Canadian rapper, singer and producer Moka Only. It was released by Urbnet Records and Beautiful Records on July 17, 2015. The album was entirely self-produced, and features one guest appearance from Grand Puba.

Coinciding with the album's release, a limited edition signature skateboard deck was released by the brand Skull Skates. Six music videos were released, for the songs "No", "Do You Know How To Rock", "Nothing To Me", "Chicanery", "Delux Edition", and "Starting Out". In June and July 2015, he toured the album through Ontario and New England. The album reached number 3 on !earshot's hip-hop chart in August 2015 and ranked number 13 on their year-end hip-hop chart.

== Critical reception ==
Professional ratings
Review scores
Source	Rating
RapReviews	8/10

Gregory Adams of Exclaim! noted the tracks range from "smooth and jazzy" to "90s throwback-styled" to "space age keyboard groove".

Ryan Prado of Portland Mercury called the album a "time machine to the seminal days of hip-hop when anything went".

Steve Juon of RapReviews stated "it has a very Tribe-like quality from start to finish, or perhaps a Dilla-esque one. Given the short length of the tracks it could be argued it’s the best of both".

== Track listing ==
No.	Title	Length
1.	"No"	2:36
2.	"Light of Your Life"	1:41
3.	"I Got Shit to Do"	2:40
4.	"Something or Nothin’"	1:31
5.	"Say a Little Somethin"	1:17
6.	"Movin"	1:02
7.	"Um Yeah Hey"	2:35
8.	"Ain't It Somethin' Doe"	1:09
9.	"Chicanery"	1:17
10.	"We Never Think"	2:30
11.	"Startin' Out."	1:15
12.	"Don’t Worry."	1:24
13.	"Away To You."	2:49
14.	"Speak My Spell"	1:08
15.	"Do You Know How to Rock"	1:19
16.	"Delux Edition"	1:27
17.	"More rugged" (featuring Grand Puba)	2:51
18.	"Just Dwell"	1:28
19.	"Hit the Nail"	2:42
20.	"Fishin"	1:02
21.	"Lemmee Haz"	2:21
22.	"Make It Last"	1:18
23.	"Its Practice"	1:30
24.	"Cosmology"	2:00
25.	"The Path Is Pivotal"	1:30
26.	"The Only One"	1:02
27.	"Watch Us Go"	2:12
28.	"Nothin to Me"	1:03
29.	"Steppin In the Sunset"	2:42
30.	"Holy Shit"	1:25
31.	"Lettuce"	1:19
32.	"Like..Totally"	2:59
Total length:		56:45
