= Concert for One =

Studio album by Moka Only
- Released: September 1, 2017
- Genre: Hip-hop
- Length: 41:20
- Label: Urbnet Records
- Producer: Moka Only

Moka Only chronology
To the Next Season (2016)	Concert for One (2017)	Martian Xmas 2017 (2017)

Concert for One is a studio album by Canadian rapper, singer and producer Moka Only. It was released by Urbnet Records on September 1, 2017. The album was entirely self-produced, and features one guest appearance from Dank.

Music videos were released for the songs "Replay" and "Are You Happy Now". The album reached number 7 on !earshot's hip-hop chart in January and February 2018. An instrumental version was released on June 29, 2018.

== Critical reception ==
Professional ratings
Review scores
Source	Rating
RapReviews	7.5/10

The song "Featuring Drake", which Moka begrudgingly says "maybe I’d be better off featuring Drake", received universal praise from critics.

Bandcamp Daily picked Concert for One as one of the top hip-hop albums of October 2017, with Phillip Mlynar calling it "warm, jazzy hip-hop topped with smart and humble lyrics".

Karas Lamb of Okayplayer praised the album and compared its sound to Slum Village.

Steve Juon of RapReviews compared the albums sound to J Dilla and The Low End Theory by A Tribe Called Quest. He expressed although Moka's wordplay, punchlines and lexicon lacked complexity, it would "destroy the 'comfortable and relaxing' mood" of the album.

Stuart Derdeyn of Vancouver Sun noted "The style is old school, simple beats, deep-in-the-pocket background harmonies and all kinds of dubby horns."

== Track listing ==
No.	Title	Length
1.	"Concert Intro"	0:44
2.	"Hi"	3:25
3.	"UnU"	2:48
4.	"Featuring Drake"	2:50
5.	"Demoland"	0:23
6.	"Replay"	2:36
7.	"Just Some Vibes" (featuring Dank)	2:49
8.	"Are You Happy Now"	2:31
9.	"Snapshot"	1:22
10.	"Right There"	2:36
11.	"Egg Interlude"	0:35
12.	"Not a Thing"	2:45
13.	"I May"	3:14
14.	"Green Bridge Interlude"	0:12
15.	"Real Simple Real Mellow"	2:36
16.	"Old Quirks Old Places"	2:21
17.	"Real Late"	0:52
18.	"Crinkle Jazz"	0:53
19.	"The Stars"	2:52
20.	"What Zone Now"	2:56
Total length:		41:20
