= Dog River (album) =

Studio album by Def3 and Moka Only
- Released: September 1, 2007
- Genre: Hip-hop
- Length: 37:23
- Label: Ship Records
- Producers: Moka Only; Def3; Factor; Aries; Merky Waters

Def3 chronology
Hug Life (with Merky Waters) (2005)	Dog River (2007)	Drumbo (with Factor) (2009)

Moka Only chronology
Vermilion (2007)	Dog River (2007)	Martian Xmas 2007 (2007)

Professional ratings
Review scores
Source	Rating
Exclaim!	(positive)

Dog River is a collaborative studio album by Canadian rappers Moka Only and Def3. It was released by Def3's label, Ship Records on September 1, 2007. The album was produced by Moka Only, Def3, Factor, Aries, and Merky Waters.

The album reached number 1 on Chart Attack's hip-hop chart, and number 2 on !earshot's hip-hop chart in November 2007. In 2008, the album was nominated for Western Canadian Music Awards Outstanding Urban Recording.

== Track listing ==
No.	Title	Producer	Length
1.	"What Now!"	Factor	3:10
2.	"Let Me In"	Moka Only	2:30
3.	"Eat a Bomb"	Moka Only	1:43
4.	"I Don’t Wanna Go Home"	Aries	3:11
5.	"Watch the Flowers"	Moka Only	1:40
6.	"Sunshine"	Moka Only	2:52
7.	"Got a Light"	Moka Only	2:26
8.	"Trophies"	Def3	2:31
9.	"It Gets Spent"	Moka Only	2:48
10.	"Been There Done That"	Moka Only	2:18
11.	"Getting Witty With It"	Moka Only	2:03
12.	"Behind the Bush"	Moka Only	2:04
13.	"Mumble in the Jungle"	Moka Only	2:20
14.	"F***n Around"	Moka Only	2:24
15.	"Words Could Not Explain"	Merky Waters	3:23
Total length:			37:23
