= The Desired Effect (disambiguation) =

The Desired Effect is a 2015 album by Brandon Flowers.

The Desired Effect may also refer to:

- The Desired Effect Tour, concert tour by Brandon Flowers
- The Desired Effect (Moka Only album), 2005 album by Moka Only
- Desired Effect, 2006 album by Moka Only, and the title track
