= Airport 5 (album) =

Studio album by Moka Only
- Released: April 14, 2011
- Genre: Hip-hop
- Length: 30:53
- Labels: Legendary Entertainment; Wandering Worx
- Producer: Moka Only

Moka Only chronology
Martian Xmas 2010 (2010)	Airport 5 (2011)	Barbecued Horse Contest (2011)

Airport 5 is a studio album by Canadian rapper, singer and producer Moka Only. It was released on CD by Legendary Entertainment and digitally by Wandering Worx on April 14, 2011. The album was entirely self-produced, and features guest appearances from Opio, Lil Bit and Bootie Brown. It is the fifth album of his Airport series. Three music videos were released, for the songs "Grab Grab Grab", "Rock On" and "Skronk". The videos for "Grab Grab Grab" and "Rock On" were directed by mcenroe.

== Critical reception ==
Professional ratings
Review scores
Source	Rating
HipHopDX	2.5/5 stars

Alex Dwyer of HipHopDX called the album "high-flying doze-off rap" and claimed "At times it edges on becoming elevator rap and at other times it's almost profound in its simplicity". He named "Brand Nu Shine" the best song.

Music is My Sanctuary listed "Grab Grab Grab" in their top tracks of 2011, with Lexis Charpentier calling it his "favorite low-fi hip-hop oddity of the year".

== Track listing ==
No.	Title	Length
1.	"It Don't Matter"	2:33
2.	"Grab Grab Grab"	2:34
3.	"I Do"	2:38
4.	"Brand Nu Shine" (featuring Opio)	2:40
5.	"Skronk"	2:26
6.	"Love Affair"	2:28
7.	"I'd Rather Be" (featuring Lil Bit)	2:33
8.	"Sun Come Up" (featuring Bootie Brown)	3:08
9.	"Long Range"	2:44
10.	"Are You There"	2:23
11.	"Welcome Aboard"	2:35
12.	"Rock On"	2:11
Total length:		30:53
