= Moka Only =

Canadian rapper, singer, and record producer

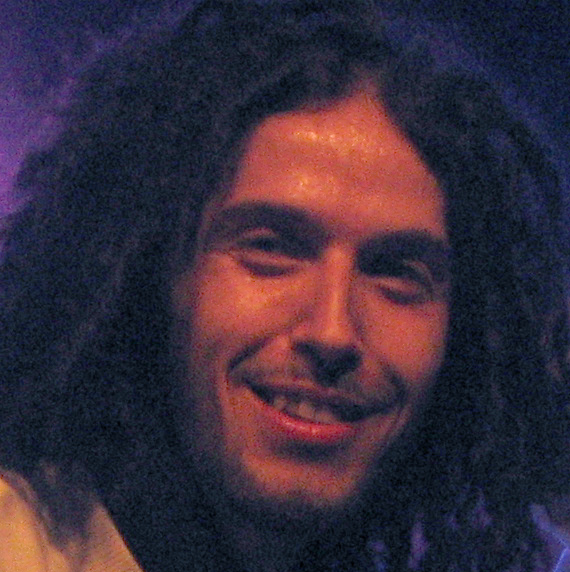
- Moka Only in 2005

Background information
- Also known as: Docta Hook; Ron Contour; Torch / Flowtorch
- Born: Daniel Jones Denton; November 14, 1973 (age 53); Langford, British Columbia, Canada
- Origin: Vancouver, British Columbia, Canada
- Genres: Hip-hop; instrumental hip-hop
- Occupations: Rapper; singer; songwriter; record producer; visual artist
- Instruments: Vocals; keyboard; sampler; synthesizer
- Works: Moka Only discography
- Years active: 1989–present
- Labels: Legendary Entertainment; Battle Axe Records; Urbnet Records
- Member of: Golden Section; Split Sphere
- Formerly of: Code Name: Scorpion; The Deli; Dominant Mammals; JMB's; Mr. Mista; The Nope; Nowfolk; Perfect Strangers; The Rappers; Spacesuits; The Summasound Clinic; Swollen Members; Tank Gawd; Zzbra
- Website: mokaonly.net

Daniel Jones Denton (born November 14, 1973), best known by his stage name Moka Only, is a Canadian rapper, singer and record producer. He has also been known as Ron Contour and Flowtorch (or simply Torch) for specific releases in his catalog.

== Career ==
=== 1973-1994: Formative years ===
He is originally from Langford, British Columbia. As a child he took guitar lessons. In his teenage years, he took trumpet lessons. He began participating in freestyles, graffiti and breaking in 1984. His first recording was made in 1986, by dubbing between two tape recorders. He started performing in 1989, when he joined the rap group Sound Advice with Juice Dub (Rennie Foster), DJ Degree One, and DJ Tee Double.

In 1991, he formed a new group named Split Sphere with Prevail. In 1993 the duo moved to San Diego, then to Vancouver in 1994. Prevail went on to form Swollen Members with Madchild. While Moka did name the group, he decided to pursue a solo career. The name, which is a double entendre for a large crew and a sexual innuendo, was later listed as one of the worst rapper names by Complex and Cracked.

=== 1995-2000: First releases and early collaborations ===
In 1995, he released his debut album titled Upcoast Relix. He was also featured on an episode of RapCity in 1995, which showcased Vancouver hip-hop. He continued self-distributing tapes through the mid to late 1990s, including the solo albums Dusty Bumps in 1996, Durable Mammal in 1997, and Fall Collection 1997.

In 1997, he released a split EP with Sixtoo titled The Crystal Senate. His side was mixed by KutMasta Kurt and includes the song "Ow (When I Step In)", which reached number 37 on Gavin Report's hip-hop radio airplay chart, and number 23 on Hits Magazine's Rap Radio Top Thirty.

In 1998, he released the solo album Monsterpiece, and made his first collaboration album with producer Deceo Ellipsis titled Apenuts. In 1999, they released the albums Mount Unpleasant and Mr. Behavior, followed by Flowtorch in 2000.

In the late 1990s to early 2000s, he was in the collective City Planners with producers Sichuan and Sweet G, and rappers Ishkan and Jeff Spec. The crew was once named in Urb Magazine's "The Next 100". He paired with Ishkan to create Nowfolk, releasing Style Gangstas in 1999. Also in 1999, he was featured on the songs "Crypik Souls Crew" and "Crazy Cause I Believe (Early Morning Sunshine)" by LEN from their breakthrough album You Can't Stop the Bum Rush. He also made cameo appearances in the music videos for "Feelin' Alright" and "Steal My Sunshine".

=== 2000-2001: Home studio and reissues ===
In 2000 he attained a home studio, which was funded by performing live shows and, predominantly, a publishing deal with EMI. In January he released the album Everyday Details, followed by his first two fully self-produced albums Beauty is a Free Road in June, and Road Life in August. Also in 2000, he released the collaboration album Dominant Mammals with Kirby Dominant, which was reiussed two years later as Super Future Stars. In 2001, he released the albums Mokefluenza and The Quick Hits on Legendary Entertainment, and the label reissued many of his early independent releases on CD.

=== 2001-2005: Battle Axe Records ===
In 2001, he released Lime Green, his first album with Battle Axe Records. Also in 2001, he released the collaboration album Code Name: Scorpion with Prevail and Abstract Rude and the solo album Moka Only is… Ron Contour. Later in 2001, he was featured on the Swollen Members song "Fuel Injected", which won four MuchMusic Video Awards. He also appeared on the group's next single "Bring It Home", which peaked at number 3 on the Canadian singles chart. Both singles reached number 1 on the MuchMusic Top 30 Countdown. The album Bad Dreams peaked at number 34 on the Canadian albums chart, and placed on multiple Canadian year-end charts in 2002. The album also achieved Platinum status by the CRIA, and won Rap Recording of the Year at the 2002 Juno Awards. (Note: He was awarded a physical platinum plaque for Bad Dreams (see citation 31), but it is unknown if he was awarded a physical Juno Award.) After this success, he joined the group for a number of songs on their next album.

In 2002, Swollen Members released Monsters in the Closet, a collection of B-sides, unreleased tracks and three newly produced songs. Two of the new songs "Breath" (featuring Nelly Furtado) and "Steppin' Thru" reached number 1 on the MuchMusic Top 30 Countdown. "Breath" also won a MuchMusic Video Award for Best Rap Video. The album debuted at number 7 on the Canadian albums chart, and placed on multiple Canadian year-end charts in 2002. The album also earned a Gold certification from the CRIA, and won Rap Recording of the Year at the 2003 Juno Awards. Just weeks prior to Monsters in the Closet, Moka released the solo album Flood, though it was overlooked in favor of the group's album.

In 2003, he released the album Lowdown Suite, which suffered a similar fate as his previous solo effort. The group's next album Heavy was released later in the same year and included Moka on every song, for the first time. The album debuted at number 14 on the Canadian albums chart. The song "Watch This" peaked at number 21 on the MuchMusic Top 30 Countdown. Also in 2003, he featured on the song "Better Days" from the album Natural Progression by Sweatshop Union, which peaked at number 23 on the MuchMusic Top 30 Countdown in August of 2004. All three albums were nominated for Outstanding Rap/Hip-Hop Recording at the Western Canadian Music Awards in 2004, Natural Progression, Lowdown Suite, and Heavy, which won the award. After this he left Swollen Members and returned his focus mostly to solo work.

On August 16, 2005, he released his final album with Battle Axe Records titled The Desired Effect, which he once referred to as "The Not So Desired Effect" due to issues with Nettwerk. The music video for "Once Again" peaked at number 13 on the MuchMusic Top 30 Countdown, and was the number 4 most streamed video on MuchMusic from August 12–November 5, 2005. The song also reached number 24 on Radio & Records CHR/Pop Top 30 chart.

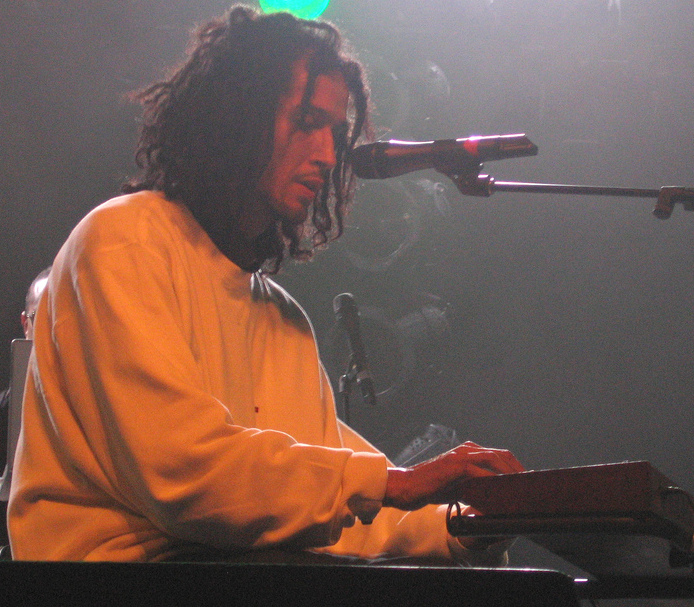
Moka Only performing in 2005

=== 2005-2007: Japan exclusives, Desired Effect, and The Station Agent ===
In October of 2005, he released Dirty Jazz, a Japan exclusive CD, with new tracks and a few from the previous album. In March of 2006, he performed at South by Southwest. On September 29, 2006, Desired Effect was unveiled. In his own words, "THIS is what I really wanted The Desired Effect to be.. raw, continuous and to the point". Just a month later he released The Station Agent, an album containing primarily instrumental tracks. In 2007, he released another Japan exclusive CD titled Moka Only vs Atsushi Numata, collaborating with the producer of the same name.

=== 2007-2015: Series projects and multi-label output ===
In 2007, he started the Airport series, and the Martian Xmas series, both originally released by Legendary Entertainment. He continued the Airport series, releasing annually for six years. The Martian Xmas series is ongoing and has totaled 22 releases. Also in 2007 he released Vermilion, his first Urbnet Records album, and the collaboration album Dog River with Def3 on Ship Records. Both albums reached number 1 on Chart Attack's hip-hop chart. Additionally in 2007, he released The Creepee Eepee, followed in 2008 by Creepee Eepee 2. Also in 2008, he released the albums Clap Trap and Carrots and Eggs on Urbnet, and Psychodelic with producer Tre through Threat-House Records. Carrots and Eggs reached number 1 on Chart Attack's hip-hop chart. From 2008-2011, he released multiple albums under the alias Ron Contour.

In 2009 he released Lowdown Suite 2… The Box, the sequel of his 2003 album. He also released the collaboration album Melba in 2009, with Psy under the group name The Nope. Additionally in 2009, he performed at South by Southwest for the second time in his career. From 2010-2012, he released a collaboration album with a different producer each year, Saffron in 2010 with Factor Chandelier, Crickets in 2011 with Chief, and Bridges in 2012 with Ayatollah.

In 2011, he released his first fully instrumental album, titled Barbecued Horse Contest. In 2012, he released Zzbra: Original Motion Picture Soundtrack, a collaboration with production team The Draft Dodgers and rapper Evil Ebenezer. Later in 2012, he released the final Airport album, Airport 6, and an EP titled The Bug Out with Mr. Brady under the group name Mr. Mista. Also in 2012, he was featured in the documentary Hip Hop Eh.

In 2013, he released Doctor Do Much on Urbnet, followed by the self-released Mutant. In 2014, he returned with Psy as The Nope, releasing an EP tited Sinus. In the same year, he released the solo album Sex Money Moka, and the group album Spacesuits with Jules Chaz, LMNO, and Mr. Brady, both released on Urbnet Records.

The albums Vermilion, Dog River, Carrots and Eggs, Airport 6, Zzbra: Original Motion Picture Soundtrack and Sex Money Moka each received nominations for Western Canadian Music Awards. The albums Vermilion, Clap Trap, Carrots and Eggs and Airport 6 each reached number 1 on !earshot's hip-hop chart.

In 2015, he released Chicken Wingz on Self Serve Records, followed by Magickal Weirdness on Urbnet. Also in 2015, he joined the collective Torchlight Commission with A-Ro, Illa J, Ishkan, Jeff Spec, Jon Rogers, Jules Chaz, LMNO, Mosiac, Mr. Brady, and Potatohead People.

=== 2016-present: Urbnet Records continued ===
In 2016, he released 12 full-length albums, one in each month. The albums were released digitally and as a limited edition, two part cassette collection. Two of the albums, Magnesium Opium and The Winter From 2001, were released with Ishkan as Nowfolk. The recordings were recovered from Moka's ADAT system, which was damaged in June 2003. In May, he released an instrumental album titled I'm Delighted. In August, he released the third and final album of his California Sessions series, which was introduced a year prior and contains material recorded in 2003.

In 2017, he released the solo album Concert for One, and the collaboration EP Vibes with producer Reckognize Real. In 2018, he released Myopic Bubble on the label Dead Wrestlers Music, which was reissued by Urbnet in 2025. He was nominated by Western Canadian Music Awards for Best Rap/Hip-Hop Artist of the Year in 2018.

In 2019, he released the solo album Patina, followed by JMB's Vol. 1, a collaboration with Jon Rogers and Mr. Brady. His next solo album, It Can Do, was released in 2020. He was nominated again for Best Rap/Hip-Hop Artist of the Year at the 2020 Western Canadian Music Awards. Later in 2020, he released the album She ran away to Mexico to join the circus, which contains material recorded in 2001. His final album of 2020 was a collaboration with producer KutMasta Kurt titled Microphone Deflection under the group name Tank Gawd. He also introduced a new alter ego on the album, named Docta Hook.

In 2022, he released Summer 2002, Vol. 1 and Vol. 2, a double album of songs recorded twenty years prior. Also in 2022, he released The Mothership with rapper Switch, and Midnight Sessions with producer The SOULution. In 2023, he released In and of Itself and the instrumental album Spooky Beats n' Other Treats, which reached number 1 on the campus based community radio station CJSR-FM.

In 2024, Nowfolk digitally released and reissued CDs of their 2002 album The Moon, marking its first availability since the original CD copies went out of print in 2004. He also released multiple collaborations with different producers in 2024, including albums The Deli with Baptiste Hayden, Archeology with Soulful Playground, AMALAMA with Alcynoos and Parental, and the EP Inference and Hearsay with producer K-Rec and rapper Checkmate. Later in the year, he released the solo album Arbutus Canyon.

In early 2025, he released More Vibes & B-Sides with producer Reckognize Real. Later in the year, his aliases Ron Contour and Docta Hook returned on the EP Beaming, a collaboration with producer Rad Brown.

In May of 2026, he released the solo album Many Pies, followed in July by the collaboration album Welcome to the Agrodome with Birdapres and K-Rec under the name Golden Section. In September, he released an EP titled Witness the Splitness with Prevail as Split Sphere.

=== Other notable collaborations ===
He has collaborated with a number of artists including Aceyalone, Awol One, Billy Woods, Bootie Brown, Buck 65, Casual, Craig G, CRUNK23, Dan-e-o, Dank, Del the Funky Homosapien, DL Incognito, Dragon Fli Empire, Elucid, Eternia, Frank Nitt, Ghettosocks, God Made Me Funky, Grand Puba, Josh Martinez, Kinnie Starr, Kissey Asplund, Kool Keith, Korry Deez, k-os, Kyprios, MF Doom, More or Les, Muneshine, Myka 9, O.C., Open Mike Eagle, Opio, Pip Skid, Planet Asia, Plug 2, Sadat X, Son Doobie, Sunspot Jonz, Thrust, and Wordburglar. In 2009, he was featured on the song "Quit While You’re Ahead" with fellow Canadian rappers Classified, Maestro Fresh Wes and Choclair.

Producers he has collaborated with include The Alchemist, Chin Injeti, J Dilla, J. Rawls, The Matrix, and Oh No. He is the only Canadian musician to collaborate with J Dilla before his passing.

He has produced songs for other artists including Baba Brinkman, Lil B, and Snak the Ripper. He has also produced albums for artists including Extended Playpen by Davepsy in 2017, and History Rhymes If It Doesn't Repeat (A Southend Healing Ritual) by Gabriel Teodros in 2018. Later in 2018, he produced the album The Supreme Paradigm Act I: The Grand Scheme for WISECRVCKER, with guest appearances from 2Mex, Blueprint, Celph Titled, Deacon the Villain, El Da Sensei, Eligh, The Grouch, Ill Bill, Lord Jamar, Rakaa, Sa-Roc, Scarub, Stic and Tonedeff.

=== In skateboarding culture ===
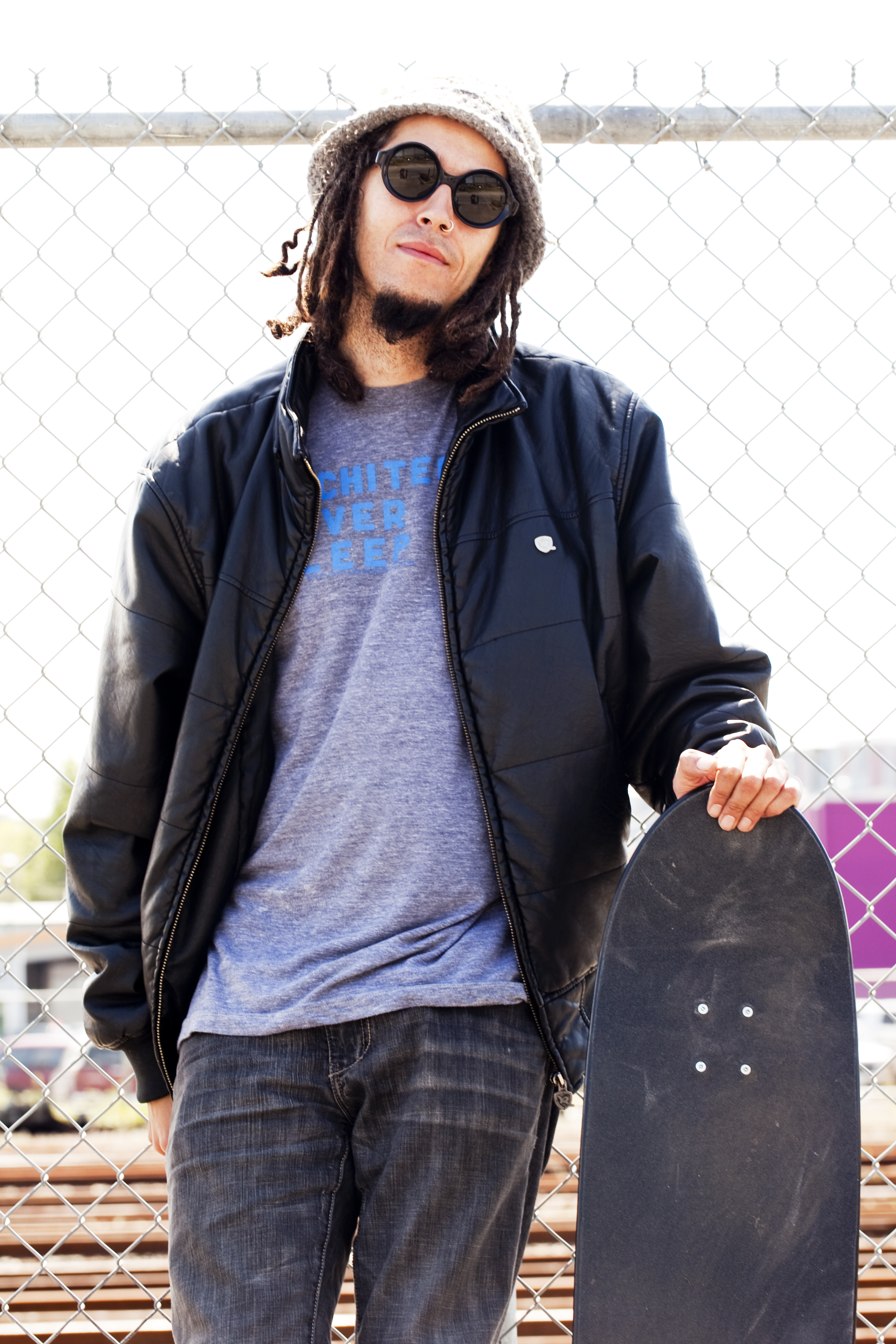
Moka Only with a skateboard in 2010

He was a skateboarder for much of his early life and can be seen riding in some music videos. His music is featured in two Red Dragon skate videos "RDS / FSU / 2002" and "Skateboard Party". His song "Red Dragon" first appeared on the 2002 Swollen Members album Monsters in the Closet, and later on their 2009 album Armed to the Teeth. In 2012, he released a music video for the song "Dragon's Gate" with Def3, which was filmed in the Red Dragons warehouse. In 2015, the brand Skull Skates released a limited edition signature deck coinciding with the release of his album Magickal Weirdness.

== Artistry ==
=== Musical style ===
His production is primarily sample-based, and he often uses non-quantized drums, similar to J Dilla and Madlib, both of whom he has been compared to. He utilizes both analog and digital techniques in his recording process, often times exporting digital recordings to cassette, then back to digital.

He has used a large collection of synthesizers including a Casio CZ-5000, Korg Triton, microKORG, Minimoog Voyager, Nord Lead 2, Realistic Concertmate MG-1, Roland Juno 6, Six-Trak, Yamaha CS1x and Yamaha DX27, samplers including a Boss SP-303 and Roland SP-555, multi-track recorders including a Portastudio 24 and Roland VS-2480, electric pianos including a Fender Rhodes and a Wurlitzer, workstations including an Akai MPC-2000XL and Yamaha V50, a Casio SK-1 sampling keyboard, and a Jackson electric guitar. Other instruments he has used include the accordian, banjo, electronic keyboard, glockenspiel, melodica, piano, theremin, toy piano, trumpet, turntable, and xylophone.

He has named Ornette Coleman, Herbie Hancock, Frank Zappa and Native Tongues as influences. Early in his career, he was influenced by bebop style jazz. Later in his career, he said that most of his favorite jazz musicians are saxophone players. He once said, "In the back of my head, I always wanted to be a jazz artist, but didn't feel I had all the skills, so I channeled that energy into hip-hop. The way I did it was to marry both worlds together."

=== Visual art ===
In addition to making music, he illustrated the cover artwork for his albums Carrots and Eggs, In and of Itself, AMALAMA Spooky Beats n' Other Treats, Many Pies, The Mothership EP, and the single "Heart at Home". He took photographs for the cover of his first Airport album, and Arbutus Canyon. He named Miles Davis and Noah Becker the biggest influences to his visual art.

== Legacy ==
With over 100 albums released, he has often been credited as one of the most prolific artists in hip-hop, and Canada. He has been nicknamed "The West Coast's Most Prolific", or simply "The Most Prolific", which he refers to on a song of the same name from his album Road Life.

Aaron Zorgel of Complex credited him as "a staple of the Canadian rap game", and Jake Paine of HipHopDX claimed he is "arguably British Columbia's most successful emcee." CBC Music ranked him number 12 on their list of "The 25 Greatest Canadian Rappers".

In a 2024 interview with Toronto Star, actress and singer Pam Grier praised his music and live performance. Frequent collaborator Gabriel Teodros has described him as a mentor, stating "When I was 19 years old, he kind of took me under his wing and showed me what it was like to have a home studio and how to do all this stuff independently."

== Personal life ==
Moka Only is 6 ft 5 in (196 cm) tall. He is a freemason within the Grand Lodge of British Columbia & the Yukon. He is a Master Mason and has attained the 32nd degree of the Scottish Rite.

== Discography ==
Notable albums

- Road Life (2000)
- Lime Green (2001)
- Code Name: Scorpion (with Code Name: Scorpion) (2001)
- Flood (2002)
- Monsters in the Closet (with Swollen Members) (2002)
- Lowdown Suite (2003)
- Heavy (with Swollen Members) (2003)
- The Desired Effect (2005)
- Desired Effect (2006)
- The Station Agent (2006)
- Vermilion (2007)
- Dog River (with Def3) (2007)
- Clap Trap (2008)
- Carrots and Eggs (2008)
- Lowdown Suite 2… The Box (2009)
- Saffron (as Ron Contour with Factor Chandelier) (2010)
- Airport 5 (2011)
- Barbecued Horse Contest (2011)
- Crickets (with Chief) (2011)
- Zzbra: Original Motion Picture Soundtrack (with Zzbra) (2012)
- Bridges (with Ayatollah) (2012)
- Airport 6 (2012)
- Sex Money Moka (2014)
- Spacesuits (with Spacesuits) (2014)
- Magickal Weirdness (2015)
- I'm Delighted (2016)
- Concert for One (2017)
- In and of Itself (2023)
- Airport (series) (2007-2012)
- #12albumsFor2016 (series) (2016)
- Martian Xmas (series) (2007-2025)

== Awards and nominations ==
Solo

Awards and nominations as a solo artist
Year	Organization	Award	Result	Ref(s)
2004	Western Canadian Music Awards	Outstanding Rap/Hip Hop Recording Lowdown Suite	Nominated	
2008	Western Canadian Music Awards	Outstanding Urban Recording Vermilion	Nominated	
2009	Western Canadian Music Awards	Rap/Hip Hop Recording of the Year Carrots and Eggs	Nominated	
2013	Western Canadian Music Awards	Rap/Hip Hop Recording of the Year Airport 6	Nominated	
2015	Western Canadian Music Awards	Rap/Hip Hop Recording of the Year Sex Money Moka	Nominated	
2018	Western Canadian Music Awards	Rap/Hip Hop Artist of the Year	Nominated	
2020	Western Canadian Music Awards	Rap/Hip Hop Artist of the Year	Nominated	

Collaborative

Awards and nominations with other artists
Year	Organization	Award	Result	Ref(s)
2008	Western Canadian Music Awards	Outstanding Urban Recording Dog River (with Def3)	Nominated	
2012	Western Canadian Music Awards	Rap/Hip Hop Recording of the Year Zzbra: Original Motion Picture Soundtrack (with Zzbra)	Nominated	

with Swollen Members

=== Juno Awards ===
Awards and nominations with Swollen Members
Year	Award	Result	Ref(s)
2003	Rap Recording of the Year Monsters In The Closet	Won	
2003	Group of the Year	Nominated	

=== MTV Video Music Awards ===
Awards and nominations with Swollen Members
Year	Award	Result	Ref(s)
2002	International Viewer's Choice: Canada "Fuel Injected"	Nominated	

=== MuchMusic Video Awards ===
Awards and nominations with Swollen Members
Year	Award	Result	Ref(s)
2002	Best Rap Video "Fuel Injected"	Won	
2002	Best Independent Video "Fuel Injected"	Won	
2002	VideoFACT Award "Fuel Injected"	Won	
2002	Best Director (Wendy Morgan) "Fuel Injected"	Won	
2002	Best Video "Fuel Injected"	Nominated	
2002	Best Cinematography "Fuel Injected"	Nominated	
2003	Best Rap Video "Breath" (ft. Nelly Furtado)	Won	
2003	Best Video "Breath" (ft. Nelly Furtado)	Nominated	
2003	Best Independent Video "Breath" (ft. Nelly Furtado)	Nominated	
2003	Peoples Choice: Favourite Canadian Group "Breath" (ft. Nelly Furtado)	Nominated	

=== Western Canadian Music Awards ===
Awards and nominations with Swollen Members
Year	Award	Result	Ref(s)
2003	Outstanding Rap/Hip Hop Recording Monsters In The Closet	Won	
2003	Video of the Year "Breath" (ft. Nelly Furtado)	Won	
2004	Outstanding Rap/Hip Hop Recording Heavy	Won	
