= Zzbra: Original Motion Picture Soundtrack =

Studio album by Zzbra
- Released: January 31, 2012
- Genre: Hip-hop
- Length: 43:35
- Label: Camobear Records
- Producer: The Draft Dodgers

Zzbra: Original Motion Picture Soundtrack is a collaborative studio album based on a fictional movie, by Zzbra, consisting of Canadian rappers Moka Only and Evil Ebenezer, and producers Stuey Kubrick and U-Tern (The Draft Dodgers). It was released by Josh Martinez's label, Camobear Records on January 31, 2012.

In January of 2012, Moka Only and Evil Ebenezer performed "Let's Roll" at the Boneta for Vancouver Sun's Gastown Sessions. In February and March, they toured the album through Alberta and Ontario. In late March, live performances of "Elephant" and "Let's Roll" were released on Exclaim!'s YouTube channel.

Three music videos were released, for the songs "Green", "Elephant" and "Let's Roll". A music video was also released for a remix of "Elephant", featuring Snak the Ripper. The album reached number 4 on !earshot's hip-hop chart in April 2012. Later in 2012, the album was nominated for Western Canadian Music Awards Rap/Hip-Hop Recording of the Year.

== Critical reception ==
Professional ratings
Review scores
Source	Rating
Northern Transmissions	8.7/10

Aaron Matthews of Exclaim! said "Moka's mumbly croak plays off Ebenezer's nasally tone well, while the Draft Dodgers' production complements the inanity" and expressed "In the increasingly dour modern rap world, an album this endearingly weird and fun is a treat".

Max Robin of Music is My Sanctuary noted the album "includes brass, weird percussions and guitars reminiscent of classic James Bond movie scores" and claimed "the fun the heroes seem to have is enough to make the listener overlook the weirdness" of the album.

Sarah Ferguson of Northern Transmissions stated "Stuey Kubrick’s production with U-Tern builds amped-up party energy to accompany Moka Only's backstreet natural flow, and Ebenezer's to the point and passionate rhymes."

== Track listing ==
No.	Title	Length
1.	"Intro"	1:04
2.	"Let's Roll"	3:10
3.	"Green"	2:39
4.	"Raisins"	2:32
5.	"Number One"	3:40
6.	"Call for Some Help"	3:35
7.	"Running Back"	3:06
8.	"Elephant"	3:04
9.	"I Look Lebanese"	3:55
10.	"Stunt Driver"	2:47
11.	"Z"	3:24
12.	"Like I Love You"	4:04
13.	"Uh Huh"	2:56
14.	"Zzbra Homie"	3:39
Total length:		43:35
