= Station master (disambiguation) =

A station master (or stationmaster) is the person in charge of a railway station.

The term may also refer to:

- The Stationmaster (1925 film), a 1925 Soviet drama film
- Station Master (1941 film), a Czech comedy film
- Station Master (1966 film), a 1966 Indian film
- The Stationmaster (1972 film), a 1972 drama film
- Station Master (1988 film), a 1988 Telugu drama film
- "The Station Master", a short story from The Belkin Tales series by Alexander Pushkin
- The Stationmaster, a variant of the English title for the 1940 German film Der Postmeister, based on Pushkin's story

== See also ==
- All India Station Masters' Association, an Indian trade union
- Station agent (disambiguation)
