= I Wanna =

I Wanna may refer to:

- "I Wanna" (The All-American Rejects song) (2009)
- "I Wanna" (Bob Sinclar song) (2010)
- "I Wanna" (Marie N song), winner of the 2002 Eurovision Song Contest representing Latvia
- "I Wanna", a 1995 song by Montell Jordan from This Is How We Do It
- "I Wanna", a 2017 song by Chris Brown from Heartbreak on a Full Moon
- "I Wanna", a 2014 song by Moka Only from Sex Money Moka
- "I Wanna", a 2023 song by Not3s and TBJZL
