= Station agent =

Station agent may refer to:

- The person in charge of a railway station, also called the station master.
- Stock and station agent, who provides a support service to the agricultural community, particularly in Australia and New Zealand.
- The Station Agent, a 2003 American comedy-drama film.
- The Station Agent, a 2006 album by Moka Only
