= Ghost Town Prophecy =

Studio album by Kae Sun
- Released: August 21, 2007
- Recorded: January 2007–April 2007
- Genre: Soul
- Length: 22:36
- Label: Last Press Label
- Producer: Jordan Abraham, Kae Sun, Kojo Damptey

Kae Sun chronology
Soliloquy (2006)	Ghost Town Prophecy (2007)

Ghost Town Prophecy is a 2007 album/EP by Canadian/Ghanaian musician Kae Sun.

== Track listing ==
1. "Where Did Everybody Go" – 3:44
2. "Kidnapped" – 3:38
3. "Stay Up" – 3:52
4. "Metropolis" – 2:54
5. "Living In The City" – 3:38
6. "Angels By Day" – 4:37

Note that "Metropolis" was originally titled "Shivaree", written by What the Thunder Said and adapted by Kae Sun.
