= Crickets (Moka Only and Chief album) =

Studio album by Moka Only and Chief
- Released: November 8, 2011
- Genre: Hip-hop
- Length: 50:15
- Label: Feelin' Music
- Producer: Chief

Moka Only chronology
Barbecued Horse Contest (2011)	Crickets (2011)	Martian Xmas 2011 (2011)

Chief chronology
Drone Beats & Electric Waves (2011)	Crickets (2011)	Shadows Chapter 1 (2012)

Crickets is a collaborative studio album by Canadian rapper/singer Moka Only and Swiss producer Chief. It was released by Chief's label, Feelin' Music on November 8, 2011. One music video was released, for the title track. Crickets Remixes Part 1 was released on November 25, 2011, followed by Crickets Remixes Part 2 on December 20, 2011.

== Critical reception ==
Professional ratings
Review scores
Source	Rating
RapReviews	6.5/10
Scratched Vinyl	8/10

Robin Murray of Clash called it "an album covered in purebred Detroit dustiness slash wateriness. While sticking rigidly to a well-worn agenda of sunken basslines and drum snap."

Matt Jost of RapReviews claimed Chief's production had more "polish" compared to Moka's solo work. He said Moka was "fresher" on Crickets than other projects, but criticized some of his lyrics.

Chi Chi Talken of Scratched Vinyl praised Chief's production and noted Moka's "flow is dense in its wordplay, and he switches up his delivery often, sometimes singing phrases for emphasis".

== Track listing ==
No.	Title	Length
1.	"Crickets"	3:18
2.	"Mess Around"	3:02
3.	"Let It Show"	3:04
4.	"For Always"	2:56
5.	"In Here"	3:19
6.	"Form the Future"	2:51
7.	"Relief"	2:50
8.	"What to Do"	3:11
9.	"Tropicana"	3:08
10.	"Show"	3:12
11.	"Next Step"	2:57
12.	"It’s All Us"	3:55
13.	"Appreciation"	2:53
14.	"First Time Back"	3:22
15.	"If You Want It"	3:16
16.	"The New"	3:26
Total length:		50:15
