= Bridges (Moka Only and Ayatollah album) =

Studio album by Moka Only and Ayatollah
- Released: April 10, 2012
- Recorded: 2011–2012
- Genre: Hip-hop
- Length: 39:32 • CD; 42:50 • LP; 49:34 • Digital
- Label: Green Streets Entertainment
- Producer: Ayatollah

Moka Only chronology
Martian Xmas 2011 (2011)	Bridges (2012)	Airport 6 (2012)

Ayatollah chronology
Fingertips (2011)	Bridges (2012)	Avant Garde (2013)

Bridges is a collaborative studio album by Canadian rapper/singer Moka Only (also credited as Ron Contour) and American producer Ayatollah. It was released by Green Streets Entertainment on April 10, 2012. Two music videos were released, for the songs "Come Along" and "Set Up a Mic".

== Critical reception ==
Professional ratings
Review scores
Source	Rating
HipHopDX	3/5 stars
Okayplayer	83/100
RapManiacz	3.5/4
ScratchedVinyl	3/10

Aaron Matthews of Exclaim! and Antonio Silas of Okayplayer both praised Ayatollah’s soulful production, but said it offered "little variety". HipHopDX stated "his soul sampling is appreciated" but "redundant".

Aaron Matthews of Exclaim! noted "Moka mostly kicks nonsensical, slightly offbeat raps", calling the album "fun but disposable".

HipHopDX called the album "an integrity-laced one-time listen" and expressed Moka utilized "an off-kilter flow almost to a fault".

Antonio Silas of Okayplayer called the album "eclectic" and noted Moka's "elaborate" and "comedic wordplay".

RapManiacz said the production "testifies to a propensity to the most traditional boom bap, while welcoming the typical sounds of the new millennium". He expressed Moka had a "very recognizable vocal timbre" and praised his "ability to remain faithful to his flow while adapting".

Chi Chi Talken of Scratched Vinyl claimed the album failed to meet expectations and criticized Moka's "offensive" lyrical content, saying it "confirms stereotypes of hip hop detractors".

== Track listing ==
CD tracklist
No.	Title	Length
1.	"Get a Soda"	2:14
2.	"Fishgills"	2:46
3.	"Come Along"	2:52
4.	"Heavy as I Used to Be"	3:08
5.	"For the Country"	2:28
6.	"Anything You Know"	2:41
7.	"I Tell Ya"	2:47
8.	"Set Up a Mic"	1:58
9.	"Afford the Best"	2:27
10.	"Everything"	3:19
11.	"Eckhart Tolle"	2:29
12.	"Bridges"	3:04
13.	"Betcha Neva Thought"	2:29
14.	"Update"	2:46
15.	"Future Novelist"	2:04
Total length:		39:32

LP bonus tracks
No.	Title	Length
16.	"Guess Who’s Best"	2:21
17.	"Sodium"	:57
Total length:		42:50

Digital bonus tracks
No.	Title	Length
16.	"Get This Style"	2:46
17.	"Elephant Bill"	1:28
18.	"Guess Who’s Best"	2:21
19.	"I’m Not a Menace"	2:30
20.	"Sodium"	:57
Total length:		49:34
