= Bank On It =

- "Bank On It", a song by Moka Only from the album Clap Trap, 2008
- "Bank On It", a song by Burna Boy from the album Twice as Tall, 2020
