= Carrots and Eggs =

Studio album by Moka Only
- Released: October 28, 2008
- Recorded: 2004–2008
- Genre: Hip-hop
- Length: 60:11
- Label: Urbnet Records
- Producers: Moka Only; Chief; Buck 65

Moka Only chronology
Psychodelic (with Tre) (2008)	Carrots and Eggs (2008)	Martian Xmas 2008 (2008)

Carrots and Eggs is a studio album by Canadian rapper, singer, and producer Moka Only. It was released by Urbnet Records on October 28, 2008. The album was produced by Moka Only, Chief, Buck 65, and features guest appearances from Sadat X, Bootie Brown, and Ishkan. Stuey Kubrick, Psy, and Buck 65 narrate on the album.

Music videos were released for the songs "Starfish" and "The Door". The album reached number 1 on Chart Attack's hip-hop chart in November 2008 and !earshot's hip-hop chart in December 2008. In 2009, the album was nominated for Western Canadian Music Awards Rap/Hip-Hop Recording of the Year. In 2018, the album was reissued as part of a 3 cassette collection with Vermilion and Clap Trap.

== Recording ==
The album includes tracks recorded from 2004 to the albums release, some of which were originally intended for unreleased albums Summer Summary ("Magazines" and "Starfish") and Way West ("The Door" and "Communicate"). It also includes remixes of "Colours Don't Run" and "Insular" from Clap Trap, as well as a slightly updated version of "Stay" from his 2005 album Dirty Jazz.

== Artwork and packaging ==
The cover art was illustrated by Moka Only and Urbnet co-founder Janusz Jarosinski. CD packaging was made of post consumer recycled material and vegetable based inks.

== Critical reception ==
Professional ratings
Review scores
Source	Rating
Blues & Soul	8/10
Now	4/5 Ns
Okayplayer	83/100
PopMatters	8/10
RapReviews	7.5/10
Urb	4.5/5 stars

Matt Rinaldi of AllMusic described the album as a "unique brand of laidback, breezy, head nodding hip-hop."

Blues & Soul called the album an "indulgence in slick hip-hop production" and said "it certainly has something timeless about it."

Thomas Quinlan of Exclaim! said "Carrots and Eggs might just be Moka's most professional sounding album since Vermilion, and is comprised of his most experimental production, toughest beats and tightest flows."

Another Exclaim! reviewer, Kevin Jones, praised the album's production but suggested listeners to "Scratch the disc's annoying series of interludes about carrots and eggs and you're left with yet another solid effort from the dependable Vancouverite."

Now voted "Hardly Say" (featuring Bootie Brown) as the best track. Along with a Sadat X feature that "certifies this album as straight-up dope." Stating "the LP sprinkles a dash of Madlib, Kanye West warmth and Moka's own organic jazz funk."

Andrew Martin of PopMatters described the album as "a dope-ass dusty journey through hip-hop" and claimed he is "the only cat out there putting in more work than Madlib" but "remains inspired and fresh".

Pedro Hernandez of RapReviews said "The few longer songs lead to great results" but notions "When you mix all these short tracks together you do get a pretty decent 'meal' and while I would never eat a meal consisting entirely of carrots and eggs, I can see how the combination might lead to a filling, if slightly unconventional, meal. This album can be described in the same manner as it is an entertaining, if slightly unconventional, album."

Jason Parham of Urb called it "his most audacious installment to date", praising the "jazzy horns and distorted bass coupled with his down-to-earth narrative".

== Track listing ==
No.	Title	Length
1.	"Carrottro"	3:46
2.	"Grown Man Troubles"	3:00
3.	"Hardly Say" (featuring Bootie Brown)	2:24
4.	"Felt Before" (produced by Chief)	3:04
5.	"On and on Citizen"	3:16
6.	"Eneff" (featuring Ishkan)	1:58
7.	"The Door"	3:35
8.	"Colours Don't Run"	2:18
9.	"Magazines"	1:41
10.	"Starfish"	2:25
11.	"Silver Lines"	1:15
12.	"Insular"	3:05
13.	"The New Era B-Boy Pockets" (featuring Sadat X)	2:26
14.	"Fer Sure"	2:37
15.	"I Mean Biznizz" (produced by Buck 65)	1:49
16.	"Clapsnare"	4:00
17.	"Obsolete Creature"	2:36
18.	"I'm Hot"	2:34
19.	"Salt"	2:10
20.	"Tit 4 a Tat"	2:57
21.	"Communicate"	1:38
22.	"Put My Work In"	2:38
23.	"Stay"	2:59
Total length:		60:11
