= Tru-Paz =

Tru-Paz are a Toronto-based hip hop group, composed of core members Akim, Boozie, Jakie Lu and producer DJ Unknown. They have been recording and releasing hip hop music since 2001. Tru-Paz have described their sound as hip hop with reggae and soul influences. To date, they have released 4 albums and 2 EPs, all with Urbnet Records/Incognito Entertainment.

== Biography ==
Tru-Paz first album, R-Evolution, was released in 2002 on Urbnet Records. The album featured notable songs "Step Aside", "Island Girl", and "Flags Up". This album features many Toronto hip hop artists, such as Hustleman, G of Hoodlandz, King Jus, Eklipz, Friday aka Ricky Dredd, Asiatic, and Divine Ayatollah. This album was produced and written by Akim and Dj Unknown only, as Boozie had not joined the band as yet.

While touring for R-Evolution, Boozie, who joined the tour as a hype man, demonstrated his immense talent as a vocalist. After returning from the final tour dates, the group returned to the studio, and Dj Unknown began exploring new styles of production that blended with Akim's rap vocals, and Boozie's ability to sing and rap. In 2004, the group released State of Emergency. State of Emergency was instantly recognized for its unique sound. It was featured in the Source Magazine's "Independence Day" article, and produced popular songs "Rude Boy", "One Day", and "For Whom the Bell Tolls". "For Whom the Bell Tolls" was recognized as one of the Top 15 MuchFact videos of 2004. "Rude Boy", "For Whom The Bell Tolls", and "One Day" all charted highly in the US and Canadian college radio charts, with Rude Boy topping in #1 across many US markets. In particular, "Rude Boy" was featured on the New World Disorder 6 mountain biking DVD - spreading the popularity of the band into Europe and South America.

In 2007, the group released its third LP, entitled Concrete Kings, where their sound matured and found its signature hip hop/reggae fusion. This album produced another of Tru-Paz widely popular songs, "Hotel Hell". The video for this song, directed by Marc Andre DeBruyne, was nominated for a Much Music Video Award for Best Rap Video of the Year (2008), losing to commercial rap artist Belly. Other notable singles off of Concrete Kings are "Dust Yourself Off" and "Country Road" (also released as an EP). Once again, the group toured for this album, sharing the stage with many legendary hip hop acts, such as De La Soul (Wakestock), Brother Ali (NXNE), Planet Asia, and DL Incognito.

In 2008, the band followed up their successful release of Concrete Kings with a three-song EP entitled Young Nation, the title track of which featured another widely heralded video directed by Marc Andre DeBruyne.

During the period from 2009 and 2012, the group spent a large amount of time touring, and working with the live band "Harbour Sharks". They then returned to the studio to complete the most recent album, Tru To The Game Without A Pause, where the newest member of the group, Jakie Lu, debuted as a female voice in the group. The album also features fellow Toronto MC and novelist Jelani "J-Wyze" Nias, Juno Award-winning reggae artist Exco Levi, and King Jus. This album featured the singles "Revolution", "Like Father Like Son", and "Black Widow."

== Discography ==
Album	Year released
R-Evolution	2002
State of Emergency	2004
Dust Yourself Off (EP)	2007
Concrete Kings	2007
Young Nation (EP)	2008
Tru To The Game Without A Pause	2012

All albums released on Urbnet Records/Incognito Entertainment.

Tru-Paz have released 4 full-length albums to date, garnering reviews in such publications as The Source, Okay Player, NOW Magazine, Dj Booth.com and others.
