= Barbecued Horse Contest =

Studio album by Moka Only
- Released: August 26, 2011
- Genre: Instrumental hip-hop
- Length: 34:02
- Label: Wandering Worx
- Producer: Moka Only

Moka Only chronology
Airport 5 (2011)	Barbecued Horse Contest (2011)	Crickets (with Chief) (2011)

Barbecued Horse Contest is an instrumental studio album by Canadian producer Moka Only. It was released by Wandering Worx on August 26, 2011.

== Critical reception ==
Professional ratings
Review scores
Source	Rating
RapReviews	8/10

Aaron Matthews of Exclaim! said "Barbecued Horse Contest is stellar headphone music and should be an easy cop for anyone who digs Madlib, Freddie Joachim or J Dilla's Donuts."

Steve Juon of RapReviews praised the album and Moka's use of samples stating "As the album moves onward you find yourself drawn into the layers of sampling and the headnodding beats, entering an atmospheric relationship with the sound going beyond individual samples on any track."

== Track listing ==
No.	Title	Length
1.	"Waterpark"	1:11
2.	"Barbs n' Cues"	2:12
3.	"The Chatham Bellhousian Revue"	2:51
4.	"Pemberton"	1:00
5.	"The Prestige"	1:39
6.	"The Plural of Jazz"	4:40
7.	"All You Need"	2:23
8.	"Great Beautiful One"	3:10
9.	"Glue"	1:01
10.	"Portland, Organ"	2:51
11.	"Pancake Run"	1:07
12.	"Noodle Expansion"	2:49
13.	"Ocho Suite"	1:46
14.	"Pool Cleaners"	2:08
15.	"Music for Tomato and Toy Piano"	3:14
Total length:		34:02
