= Whoever Comes Knocking =

Studio album by Kae Sun
- Released: March 2, 2018
- Length: 36:58
- Label: Moonshine
- Producer: Joshua Sadlier-Brown; Kae Sun; Ariane Moffatt

Kae Sun chronology
Afriyie (2013)	Whoever Comes Knocking (2018)

Whoever Comes Knocking is the third studio album by Ghanaian-Canadian singer-songwriter Kae Sun. It was released on March 2, 2018, by Moonshine. He revealed the album's track listing in December 2017.

== Track listing ==
1. "Kwaku's Dilemma" (Intro) – 3:05
2. "Treehouse" – 3:42
3. "Stalk" – 3:18
4. "Canary" – 4:29
5. "Longwalk" – 4:53
6. "Fix Up" (featuring Ariane Moffatt) – 3:37
7. "Flip the Rules" – 3:46
8. "Breaking" – 3:41
9. "Broken by Design" – 3:55
10. "The Moment" – 2:32
