= Desired Effect =

Studio album by Moka Only
- Released: September 29, 2006
- Recorded: 2005–2006
- Genre: Hip-hop
- Length: 49:30
- Label: Green Streets Entertainment
- Producers: Moka Only; J Dilla; Sixtoo; Oh No; J. Rawls

Moka Only chronology
Dirty Jazz (2005)	Desired Effect (2006)	The Station Agent (2006)

Singles from Desired Effect
- 1. "One Time" Released: December 11, 2021; 2. "More Soup" Released: December 11, 2021

Desired Effect is a studio album by Canadian rapper, singer and producer Moka Only. It was released by Green Streets Entertainment on September 29, 2006. The album was produced by Moka Only, J Dilla, Sixtoo, Oh No, and J. Rawls, and features one guest appearance from MF Doom.

== Recording ==
In the liner notes of the album he wrote, "THIS is what I really wanted The Desired Effect to be.. raw, continuous and to the point". When later asked about the album in 2017 he said, "You can hear a lot of my personal turmoil throughout that whole album. The only good moments during that time period were the actual recording sessions. It was therapeutic and the music allowed me to get everything off my chest".

"More Soup" refers to a saying originated in New York. Moka explained "when somebody's trying to gas you up, blow up your head. If I was trying to lead you on in any way, or patronize you, I'd be souping you."

Though it was arranged for Moka to record with J Dilla in Detroit, he decided to stay at his home studio. He picked "One Time" from a selection of multiple beat CD's sent by Dilla. The song samples "Introduction" by Bel-Sha-Zaar. The same sample was used on Deee-Lite's "Groove Is in the Heart" in 1990, and Tyler the Creator's "I Ain't Got Time!" in 2017. The sample on "One Time (the re-up version)" is slightly slower and lower-pitched than the original version, which appeared on The Desired Effect.

== Critical reception ==
Professional ratings
Review scores
Source	Rating
AllHipHop	3/5 stars
Okayplayer	4/5 stars

Greg Watkins of AllHipHop explained "Moka offers up lyrics like a more abstract Common and a sound similar to the Digable Planets-without all that jazz. The lyrical content is hard to decipher by listening even several times over, but somehow that does not make the album less enjoyable." He noted Moka's "conceptual" rhymes and said "the music emits a certain warmth".

Barometern claimed "the rhythms are rawer, more audacious, more fragmentary and experimental" than his 2003 album Lowdown Suite, and described it as having "a space funk feel".

Okayplayer stated "This project is akin to Slum Village's Fantastic Voyage Vol. 2, A Tribe Called Quest's Midnight Marauders, or some Common ish" and said "the entire project just has that Dilla vibe". They also noted "Moka establishes his own identity with skillful lyrics, crafty wordplay, diverse subject matter".

In a negative review of the song "More Soup", Kevin Yuen of Cokemachineglow called Moka "Canada's Nate Dogg" and compared Sixtoo's "cartoony loop and crisp drums" to Doom's production. He criticized Doom's "unmistakable mumbling drawl".

== Track listing ==
No.	Title	Producer	Length
1.	"Intro"	Moka Only	1:06
2.	"Desired Effect"	Moka Only	3:02
3.	"Oh-Six"	Moka Only	2:43
4.	"Weener"	Moka Only	2:20
5.	"All I Know"	Moka Only	2:54
6.	"So Heavy"	Moka Only	3:19
7.	"Miscommunication"	Moka Only	3:20
8.	"Nektar"	Moka Only	3:13
9.	"One Time (the re-up version)"	J Dilla	2:31
10.	"Problems 2003"	Moka Only	3:11
11.	"It's Done"	Moka Only	3:21
12.	"Grumble Grumble"	Moka Only	3:34
13.	"Help Us"	Moka Only	2:44
14.	"Chill"	Moka Only	3:27
15.	"More Soup" (featuring MF Doom)	Sixtoo	2:13
16.	"Keep This Moving"	Oh No	3:01
17.	"Stringbean"	J. Rawls	3:31
Total length:			49:30
