= Clap Trap =

Studio album by Moka Only
- Released: July 29, 2008
- Genre: Hip-hop
- Length: 39:45 • Original; 47:54 • Reissue
- Label: Urbnet Records
- Producers: Moka Only; DJ Nohow

Moka Only chronology
Airport 2 (2008)	Clap Trap (2008)	Psychodelic (with Tre) (2008)

Clap Trap is a studio album by Canadian rapper, singer and producer Moka Only. It was released by Urbnet Records on July 29, 2008. Aside from the DJ Nohow produced first track, the album was self-produced, and features one guest appearance from Mos Eisley.

The album reached number 1 on Chart Attack and !earshot hip-hop charts in September 2008. In 2018, the album was reissued as part of a 3 cassette collection with Vermilion and Carrots and Eggs. The reissue contains 4 bonus tracks.

== Critical reception ==
Professional ratings
Review scores
Source	Rating
Now	3/5 Ns

Kevin Jones of Exclaim! described the album as "a beat-driven scattershot of raw ideas spliced into two-minute segments that last just long enough to get you attuned to one sound before it's on to the next."

Now noted "funny little quips and thoughts burst out often" and said "Dippin' into 60's soul, 70's psychedelia, 80's pop and 90's melancholy, Clap Trap is diverse."

== Track listing ==
No.	Title	Length
1.	"Claptrap" (produced by DJ Nohow)	1:50
2.	"How Little Do You Know"	1:55
3.	"Insular"	2:12
4.	"Summer Stalker"	1:59
5.	"Trinity Hill"	1:53
6.	"Time to Clean Up"	1:47
7.	"Mo and Mo" (featuring Mos Eisley)	2:22
8.	"Colors Don’t Run"	1:45
9.	"Hotels"	2:01
10.	"Bop-a-Lude"	1:06
11.	"Bank On It"	2:00
12.	"Ontario Nights"	2:00
13.	"Piano Trak"	0:57
14.	"There I Go"	2:07
15.	"Sh*T Talkers"	1:30
16.	"Speakers, Pt. 2"	2:12
17.	"Chek Out My Beat"	1:41
18.	"Not Wrong-a-Lude"	1:10
19.	"The Buggaloo"	2:07
20.	"Wurlitzer Nights"	1:58
21.	"Out-a-Lude"	1:11
22.	"And I Love Her"	2:02
Total length:		39:45

Bonus tracks (2018 reissue)
No.	Title	Length
23.	"Around the Bend"	2:09
24.	"What Kinda Shit Is"	1:57
25.	"Nu Shit"	2:10
26.	"Bandwagon"	1:53
Total length:		47:54

- "And I Love Her" is a cover of the song by the Beatles.
