= A Captured Moment in Time =

Studio album by DL Incognito
- Released: April 8, 2008
- Genres: Canadian hip hop Underground hip hop
- Length: 45:10
- Labels: NPHH, Urbnet Records
- Producer: DL Incognito

DL Incognito chronology
| Organic Music for a Digital World (2006) | A Captured Moment in Time (2008) | Someday Is Less Than a Second Away (2013) |

Professional ratings
Review scores
| Source | Rating |
|---|---|
| RapReviews | (7.5/10) |

A Captured Moment in Time is the fourth album by Canadian rapper and producer DL Incognito. The album was nominated for Rap Recording of the Year at the 2009 Juno Awards.

== Track listing ==
| # | Title | Time |
|---|---|---|
| 1 | "Claim To Fame" | 3:59 |
| 2 | "Grand Scale" | 4:12 |
| 3 | "Too Late Now" | 3:40 |
| 4 | "Made It Through" | 2:54 |
| 5 | "Rap Soul" | 3:26 |
| 6 | "Fresh To Death" | 4:08 |
| 7 | "Owe It All To You" | 4:18 |
| 8 | "Atmosphere" | 3:33 |
| 9 | "Best Years (I Care)" | 3:35 |
| 10 | "Air Play" | 3:53 |
| 11 | "Thank You (For Listening)" | 3:20 |
| 12 | "These Are My Adventures" | 4:08 |
