= Organic Music for a Digital World =

Studio album by DL Incognito
- Released: June 26, 2006
- Genre: Canadian hip hop, Underground Rap
- Length: 54.10
- Label: Universal Music Canada, Urbnet Records
- Producer: DL Incognito

DL Incognito chronology
| Life's a Collection of Experiences (2004) | Organic Music for a Digital World (2006) | A Captured Moment in Time (2008) |

Professional ratings
Review scores
| Source | Rating |
|---|---|
| Exclaim! | (positive) |
| Okayplayer | 3.5/5 stars |
| RapReviews | 8.5/10 |

Organic Music For A Digital World is the third studio album by Canadian rapper and producer DL Incognito.

== Track listing ==
| # | Title | Time |
|---|---|---|
| 1 | "Welcome" | 2:03 |
| 2 | "Newera" | 3:44 |
| 3 | "Keep It Movin'" | 3:49 |
| 4 | "Live In My Element" | 3:22 |
| 5 | "Horoscopes" | 4:09 |
| 6 | "Surplus" | 3:09 |
| 7 | "S.Y.S.G.U. (Step Your Sneaker Game Up)" | 3:27 |
| 8 | "Ups & Downs" | 3:29 |
| 9 | "Nine Months" | 3:04 |
| 10 | "The Masses" | 3:26 |
| 11 | "Commerce" | 3:03 |
| 12 | "Two Chicks" | 4:02 |
| 13 | "Make A difference" | 3:17 |
| 14 | "Reality Prelude" | 0:39 |
| 15 | "Reality Bites" | 3:51 |
| 16 | "Farewell" | 8:36 |
