= OK Cobra =

Canadian hip hop duo

- Origin: Montreal, Quebec, Canada
- Genres: Hip hop
- Years active: 2005–present
- Label: Urbnet Records
- Members: Fritz tha Cat; Recordface
- Website: www.urbnet.com/OKCobra

OK Cobra is a Canadian hip hop duo, consisting of rapper Fritz tha Cat (Ryan Somers) and producer Recordface (Tim Horlor).

== History ==
Childhood friends originally from London, Ontario, Fritz tha Cat and Recordface later reunited in Montreal. In July 2005, as "OK Cobra", they released their self-titled debut album, which contained mostly new material supplemented with new arrangements of previously released tracks.

The album quickly reached #1 on Chart's hip hop charts, and the singles "Child in Rhyme" (sampling Deep Purple's "Child in Time"), "Time Flies", and "Fall Dumbass" have garnered extensive airplay on CBC Radio 3, which named "Time Flies" one of the best songs of 2006.

Their second album, Delirium Tremens, was released in 2009; the album appeared on the !Earshot campus and community radio The National Hip Hop Chart in November that year. A follow-up EP of demo tracks and remixes following in 2010.

OK Cobra's third album, Tilting at Windmills, was planned for an early 2011 release.

== Discography ==
- 2005 OK Cobra (Urbnet Records)
- 2009 Delirium Tremens (Urbnet Records)
- 2010 The D.T.'s (Volume One) (Urbnet Records)
