= Evil Ebenezer =

Canadian rapper and actor

- Also known as: Evil
- Born: Gaelan Anthony Bleasdale
- Origin: Vancouver, British Columbia
- Genre: Hip-hop
- Occupations: Rapper; songwriter; actor
- Years active: 1992; 2002–present
- Labels: Camobear Records; Urbnet Records
- Formerly of: Brass Tackz; Trillionaires; Zzbra
- Website: evilebenezer.com

Gaelan Anthony Bleasdale, better known by his stage name Evil Ebenezer, is a Canadian rapper and actor from Vancouver, British Columbia. His song "Told You So" won Best Music Video at the 2006 Leo Awards and he has been nominated five times at the Western Canadian Music Awards. He also performed at the Breakout West Festival in 2014 and 2015.

== Filmography ==
Year	Title	Role
1992	The Odyssey	U.V.
2002	The Water Game	Chad
2018	The Doctor's Case	Detective Constable

== Discography ==
=== Solo albums ===
- Evil (self-released, 2004)
- Call Me Evil (Camobear Records, 2006)
- The Wanderer (Camobear, 2008)
- Evil Eye (Camobear, 2010)
- The Birds (Camobear/Ephin, 2011)
- Howl (Camobear, 2013)
- Bandit (self-released, 2018)
- The Collateral Damage LP (self-released, 2020)
- Evil Thoughts Good Intentions (self-released, 2021)
- The Garden of Evil (self-released, 2023)
- The Birds II (self-released, 2024)
- I'm Good (self-released, 2025)

=== Collaboration albums ===
- By Hook or By Crook (Urbnet, 2010) (produced by Metty the Dert Merchant of Sweatshop Union, as Trillionaires)
- Zzbra: Original Motion Picture Soundtrack (Camobear, 2012) (with Moka Only, produced by Draft Dodgers, as Zzbra)
- All That's Left (Urbnet Records, 2015) (produced by Factor)
- Cultus (self-released, 2017) (produced by Stuey Kubrick)
- Rambo (self-released, 2019) (with Jyay)
- Force of Habit (Merkules Music Inc, 2020) (with Merkules)
- Steroid Era (Urbnet, 2026) (produced by C-Lance)

=== EPs ===
- Widows Creek (self-released, 2011) (produced by Factor)
- Penguin (Camobear, 2012)
- Kush Ups (self-released, 2012) (with Merkules)
- Skyscraper (self-released, 2017) (produced by Factor)
- Ghost Town (self-released, 2020)
- The Storm (One Love Records, 2021) (with Mr. ESQ)

== Awards and nominations ==
Leo Awards

Awards and nominations at the Leo Awards
Year	Award	Result	Ref(s)
2006	Best Music Video "Told You So" (with Draft Dodgers)	Won	

Western Canadian Music Awards

Awards and nominations at the Western Canadian Music Awards
Year	Award	Result	Ref(s)
2011	Rap/Hip-Hop Recording of the Year Evil Eye	Nominated	
2012	Rap/Hip-Hop Recording of the Year The Birds	Nominated	
2012	Rap/Hip-Hop Recording of the Year Zzbra: Original Motion Picture Soundtrack (with Moka Only and Draft Dodgers)	Nominated	
2014	Rap/Hip-Hop Recording of the Year Howl	Nominated	
2016	Rap/Hip-Hop Artist of the Year	Nominated	
