= Someday Is Less Than a Second Away =

Someday is Less Than a Second Away

Studio album by DL Incognito
- Released: April 16, 2013
- Genre: Hip hop, alternative hip hop
- Length: 44:21
- Label: Urbnet Records
- Producer: Techtwelve, Tom Wrecks, Illo, DL Incognito, Gigz The Unknown Producer

DL Incognito chronology
A Captured Moment in Time (2008)	Someday is Less Than a Second Away (2013)	What Once Was Will Never Be (2022)

Professional ratings
Review scores
Source	Rating
Exclaim!	8/10
Now	3/5 Ns
RapReviews	8/10

Someday Is Less Than a Second Away is a studio album by Canadian hip-hop artist DL Incognito. It was released April 16, 2013 on Urbnet Records.

== Music ==
The album is produced by Techtwelve, Dirty Sample, Gigz The Unknown Producer, Tom Wrecks, Illo and DL Incognito himself. Guest appearances include Adam Bomb, D-Sisive, Geneva B and Caliph.

== Track listing ==
No.	Title	Producer	Length
1.	"Move On (When The Love Is Gone)"	Techtwelve	3:43
2.	"Simple Math" (Adam Bomb)	Techtwelve	4:02
3.	"Days Gone" (featuring D-Sisive)	Techtwelve	4:37
4.	"Super"	Techtwelve	1:59
5.	"Icon"	Dirty Sample	2:37
6.	"The Chase"	Techtwelve	2:24
7.	"Mysterious Ways" (featuring Geneva B)	Techtwelve	4:12
8.	"Admiration"	Tom Wrecks	3:54
9.	"Grey Hairs" (featuring Caliph)	DL Incognito, Techtwelve	3:48
10.	"Here I Am"	Gigz The Unknown Producer	2:11
11.	"No Rings"	Techtwelve	3:06
12.	"Memories of My Youth"	Techtwelve	3:11
13.	"Move On (When The Love Is Gone) 2.0"	Illo	4:37
