= Kissey =

- Born: Christina Kim Ingrid Asplund; Stockholm, Sweden
- Genres: Electronic; hip hop; pop
- Occupation: singer
- Years active: 2007–present
- Labels: currently: KissKiss; past: r2 Records/K7, Recordbreakin
- Website: kissey.co

Christina Kim Ingrid Asplund, better known as Kissey (formerly Kissey Asplund), is a singer, songwriter, music producer, artist, and performer from Stockholm, Sweden.

== Career ==
Kissey released her first full-length album, Plethora, produced by Papa Jazz, on R2 Records in 2008. She has collaborated with many other producers and artists such as Zed Bias (Maddslinky), Jay Scarlett, Dorian Concept, Domu, Blu, Ben Mono, Rustie, Machinedrum, and Rampa, resulting in numerous releases as a featured vocalist. She is rumored to be working on her second album (title and label unknown).

Kissey has performed throughout The United States and Europe, including appearances at The Hultsfred Festival in Sweden, Heineken Refreshing Sounds Sessions' Welcome to Detroit concert in Amsterdam, the Netherlands, Dante's Fried Chicken, opening for Dizzee Rascal and Aaron LaCrate and appearing as a guest with The Roots, both at The Highline Ballroom in New York City. Kissey has also shared the stage with Little Dragon, Theophilus London, Dj Antipop, Guilty Simpson and Black Milk.

Noteworthy media include MTV Iggy, Current TV, BBC Radio 1 (Benji B & Gilles Peterson), Okayplayer, KCRW, and SR P3.

Kissey has been shot by celebrated photographers Jonas Åkerlund for Elle magazine and Shawn Mortensen for Nike's AM90 campaign, as one of eight featured artists/faces, internationally.

== Releases ==
=== Discography ===
Albums:

- "Plethora" (2008)

EPs:

- "Fuss'n'Fight Ep" (2008)
- "Initiation" (2014)

Singles:

- "Come Nightfall" (2013)
- "Silverlake/Snowfall" (2008)
- "Move Me/99 bottles" (2008)
- "With You" (2007)

=== Featured artist ===
Title	Year	Album/Release
"Stressin" (The Hue ft Kissey)	2011	Mushroom Jazz 7
"Happy" (Grooveman Spot ft Kissey)	2010	Brownswood Bubblers 6
"Don't Open The Window" (Zed Bias ft Kissey)	2010	Tracks from the Vault Ep
"Sunstar" (Pablo Sanchez ft Kissey)	2010	Sunstar
"So Good"(Daru Jones ft Kissey)	2010	So Good Ep
"Life" (Kenichiro Nishihara ft Kissey)	2010	Life
"Happy"(Grooveman Spot ft Kissey)	2010	Change Situation
"Kliks" (K'Bonus ft Kissey)	2010	Buckle Up Ep
"Always and Always" (Affictionados ft Kissey)	2009	Affictionados
"Firefly"(Anthony Valadez ft Kissey)	2009	Audio/Visual Sounds Inspired By All Things Visual
"I'm Right Here"(Swingkid ft Kissey)	2009	The Electric Life
"Please Don't Rain"(Sene & Blu ft Kissey)	2009	Quarter Water Supporter/Please Don't Rain
"Pop Rocks"(Vertual Vertigo & 8bit ft Kissey)	2009	Sparkie's Bungalow
"Drip Drop" (Moka Only ft Kissey)	2009	Lowdown Suite 2… The Box
"Demon Love"(Chief ft Kissey & Moka Only)	2009	Collabo Collection
"Move To Dis"(Speech Defect ft Kissey)	2009	Happy Hunting
"Travel"(IisiJii ft Kissey )	2009	4 Inside
"B?rds and Bees"(Cerebral Vortex & Erik L ft Kissey)	2009	Kitty Kat Kaboodle EP
"Smokey"(Chief ft Kissey)	2008	Food For Ya Soul
"Rain Falls"(Kenichiro Nishihara ft Kissey )	2008	Humming Jazz
"Late Night Reprise"(Suff Daddy ft Kissey)	2008	Late Night Reprise
"Put It Down (remix)"(RepLife ft Kissey. produced by AtJazz)	2008	Put It Down
"Space Water Babies"(The Astronotes ft Replife & Kissey)	2008	Subsoul
"When I Dig"(KidKanevil ft Blu & Kissey )	2008	Back Off man, I'm A Scientist
"Get Myself Together"(Eric L ft Kissey)	2008	Lose Control EP
"Faster"(Hi Perspective ft Kissey)	2008	Expansions
"Brazil"(Soultempo ft Kissey)	2008	Brazil
"Northern Lights"(Blackmonk ft Kissey )	2008	Blackmonk
"Why Talkin"(Vince Vargas ft Kissey)	2008	Why Talkin'
"Put It Down"(Replife ft Kissey)	2008	The Unclosed Mind
"Car Ride (To The Future)"(Jay Scarlett ft Kissey & Distant Starr)	2008	Various-Fresh Selects-Loose Joints'
"On Your Shoulder"(Michita ft Kissey)	2008	Metronome/On Your Shoulder
"So Good"(Daru ft Kissey)	2008	Spirit & Soul-Hop Sampler'
"Why Talkin"(Vince Vargas ft Kissey)	2008	Why Talkin
"The Draft"(Dj Jamad & Nicolay ft Kissey)	2008	Afro Collabo Vol1
"Straight Out" (Pablo Sanchez ft Kissey)	2007	
"Demonlove"(Sene ft Kissey)	2007	
"Atomic Light&Sound"(Rustie ft Kissey)	2007	Concrete Project
"Ya Mama"(Dj Krime ft Kissey)	2007	Ya Mama
"Autumn Love"(Dyno ft Kissey)	2007	9 Nine
"Return To The Source"(Bless 1 ft Kissey)	2007	Return to the Source
"Call The Boss"(Ishfaq ft Ad Dick & Kissey)	2007	The Change Ep
"LoveCount"(Flyphonic ft Kissey)	2007	Mosaic Tiles Ep
