= Merkules =

Canadian rapper

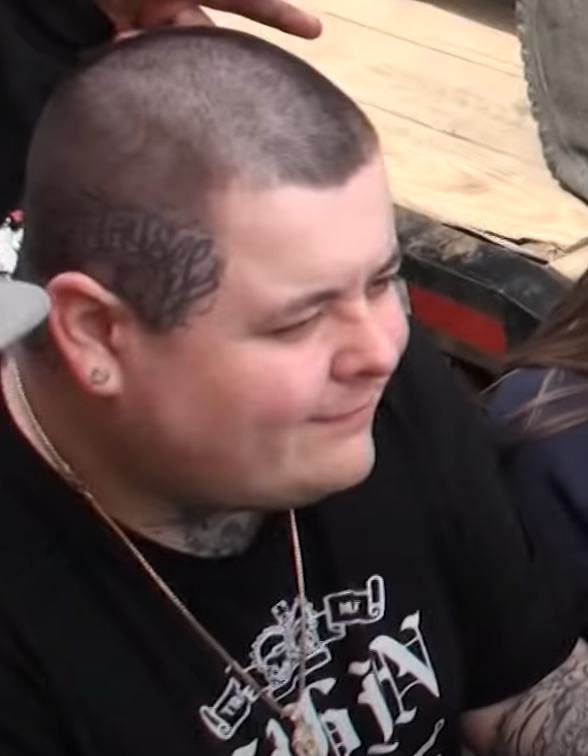
- Merkules in 2017

Background information
- Born: Cole Stevenson; September 27, 1992 (age 33)
- Genres: Canadian hip hop; underground hip hop; hardcore hip hop
- Occupations: Rapper
- Years active: 2011–present
- Labels: Death Row (current); Stealth Bomb Records (former)

Cole Stevenson, known by the stage name Merkules, is a Canadian rapper from Surrey, British Columbia. He is known for his "hangover-rap" style of music.

== Career ==
Stevenson began rhyming at age 15 under the name Merk Mikz. He met Snak the Ripper at a concert, and Stevenson subsequently joined his tour as a hype man. In 2011, the two began collaborating on music.

At the age of 16, Stevenson was randomly attacked while walking home at night. He received permanent facial scars after being beaten and stabbed. No arrests were made. His 2016 album Scars drew inspiration from the event.

In 2017, Stevenson released the album Trust Your Gut. He followed it in 2018 with the album Cole. Stevenson was set to tour with Gucci Mane in May 2019 before dropping out. His album Special Occasion was released in October of that year. The song "Bass" from the album was featured in the 2020 video game Tony Hawk's Pro Skater 1 + 2.

In 2020, Stevenson released the album Apply Pressure through his label Merkules Music and BMG. He was subsequently featured on the talk show of Dr. Phil. In 2022, Merkules released the single "I'm Here" on Death Row Records. As of 2023, Merkules has had over 900,000 monthly listeners on Spotify.

== Discography ==
List adapted from Spotify on June 18, 2025.

Studio albums and EPs

- BC Buds EP (2025)
- Survivor’s Guilt (2025)
- Eazy Merk EP (2023)
- Sick Kid EP (2023)
- Apply Pressure (2020)
- Force of Habit (with Evil Ebenezer) (2020)
- Special Occasion (2019)
- Cole (2018)
- Trust Your Gut (2017)
- Scars (2014)
- Hunger Pains (2013)
- Bacon Bits EP (2012)
- Canadian Bacon (2012)
