= The Carps =

Canadian rock music duo

- Origin: Scarborough (Toronto), Ontario, Canada
- Genres: Rock
- Years active: 2005–2010
- Label: Urbnet Records
- Members: Jahmal Tonge; Neil White

The Carps were a Canadian rock music duo composed of bassist Neil White and drummer Jahmal Tonge. They were signed to the Toronto-based label URBNET Records.

== Biography ==
According to AllMusic, the two members of The Carps were known for their distinct style, often wearing multi-coloured leather high-tops, turquoise or pink T-shirts, and skinny jeans. They blended elements of R&B and stripped-down indie rock, creating a distinctive sound as a two-piece band. Neil White and Jahmal Tonge became friends at a young age in Toronto and began making music together as a casual pastime between skateboarding and golfing.

Drawing from contrasting musical influences—Tonge having grown up on Motown and White on psychedelic rock and punk—the duo began performing at local clubs around Toronto. Tonge, who had a soulful voice reminiscent of Terence Trent D'Arby, handled vocals and drums, often singing about urban life and hipster culture, while White contributed distorted, bass-driven melodies.

After their performances in Toronto received limited response, the pair decided to tour in the United States, organizing shows in Philadelphia and New York City. Their music was better received by American indie audiences, leading to their signing with URBNET Records. In 2007, they released their debut EP, The Young and Passionate Days of Carpedia.

== History ==
The band began its career in Scarborough, Toronto in 2005.

In addition to touring Europe and North America, The Carps have played with The Cool Kids, MIA, Holy Fuck, The Hives and Lupe Fiasco.

Singer Jahmal Tonge is featured on the MSTRKRFT album Fist Of God, on Breakaway and So Deep.

The Carps have released two EPs to critical acclaim, and have been applauded for their ability to weave genres of all types into a seamless and cohesive sound.

In March 2007, The Young & Passionate Days of Carpedia vol 2.1 was released under URBNET Records. This was followed by the release of Waves & Shambles in April 2008, containing the featured track Veronica Belmont which was named after a well-known San Francisco-based tech journalist. The album also included an appearance by The Cool Kids on the Heaven's Gates & Hell's Flames remix (produced by Jahmal Tonge).

The Carps did not release a debut album and, citing other commitments, stopped touring in 2010.

== Discography ==
=== EPs ===
- The Young & Passionate Days of Carpedia vol 2.1 (March 13, 2007)
- Waves & Shambles (April 8, 2008)

== See also ==
- Canadian rock
- List of bands from Canada
- List of Canadian musicians
- Category:Canadian musical groups
