= Urbnet Records =

Independent record label

- Founded: 1999; 27 years ago
- Founder: Janusz Jarosinski; Darryl Rodway
- Distributor: Fontana North Distribution
- Genre: Hip-hop
- Country of origin: Canada
- Location: Toronto, Ontario
- Official website: urbnet.com

Urbnet Records is an independent record label based in Toronto, Ontario, Canada. It was founded by Darryl Rodway and Janusz Jarosinski in 1999 to provide distribution, marketing and promotional services to hip-hop artists throughout Canada. URBNET was distributed by EMI Music Canada from 2002–2003, Outside Music from 2003–2006 and is distributed in Canada by Fontana Distribution (North), a subsidiary of Universal Music Canada.

== Notable artists/albums ==
- The Carps
- Classified
  - Trial & Error (2003)
  - Boy-Cott-In the Industry (2005)
  - Hitch Hikin' Music (2006)
- Dan-e-o
- Davepsy
- Def3 and Factor
  - Wildlif3 (2014)
- Dirty Circus
- DJ Cosm
- DL Incognito
  - Organic Music for a Digital World (2006)
  - A Captured Moment in Time (2008)
  - Someday Is Less Than a Second Away (2013)
- D-Sisive
  - The Book EP (2008)
  - Let the Children Die (2009)
  - Jonestown (2009)
  - Vaudeville (2010)
- Dudley Perkins
- Eternia
  - It's Called Life (2005)
- Evil Ebenezer
- Grand Analog
- Jeff Spec
- Kae Sun
- Korea Town Acid
- LMNO
- Mathematik
- Moka Only
  - Vermilion (2007)
  - Clap Trap (2008)
  - Carrots and Eggs (2008)
  - Airport 6 (2012)
  - Sex Money Moka (2014)
  - Magickal Weirdness (2015)
  - I'm Delighted (2016)
  - Concert for One (2017)
  - In and of Itself (2023)
  - #12albumsFor2016 (series) (2016)
  - Martian Xmas (series) (2012-2025)
- Mood Ruff
- More or Les
- Mr. Brady
- Myka 9
- OK Cobra
- Pigeon Hole
- Red Ants
- Spacesuits
  - Spacesuits (2014)
- Sweatshop Union
  - The Bill Murray EP (2011)
- Timbuktu
- Trillionaire$
- Tru-Paz
- Wordburglar

== See also ==
- List of record labels
- List of hip-hop record labels
