= Kae Sun =

Musical Artist and Writer

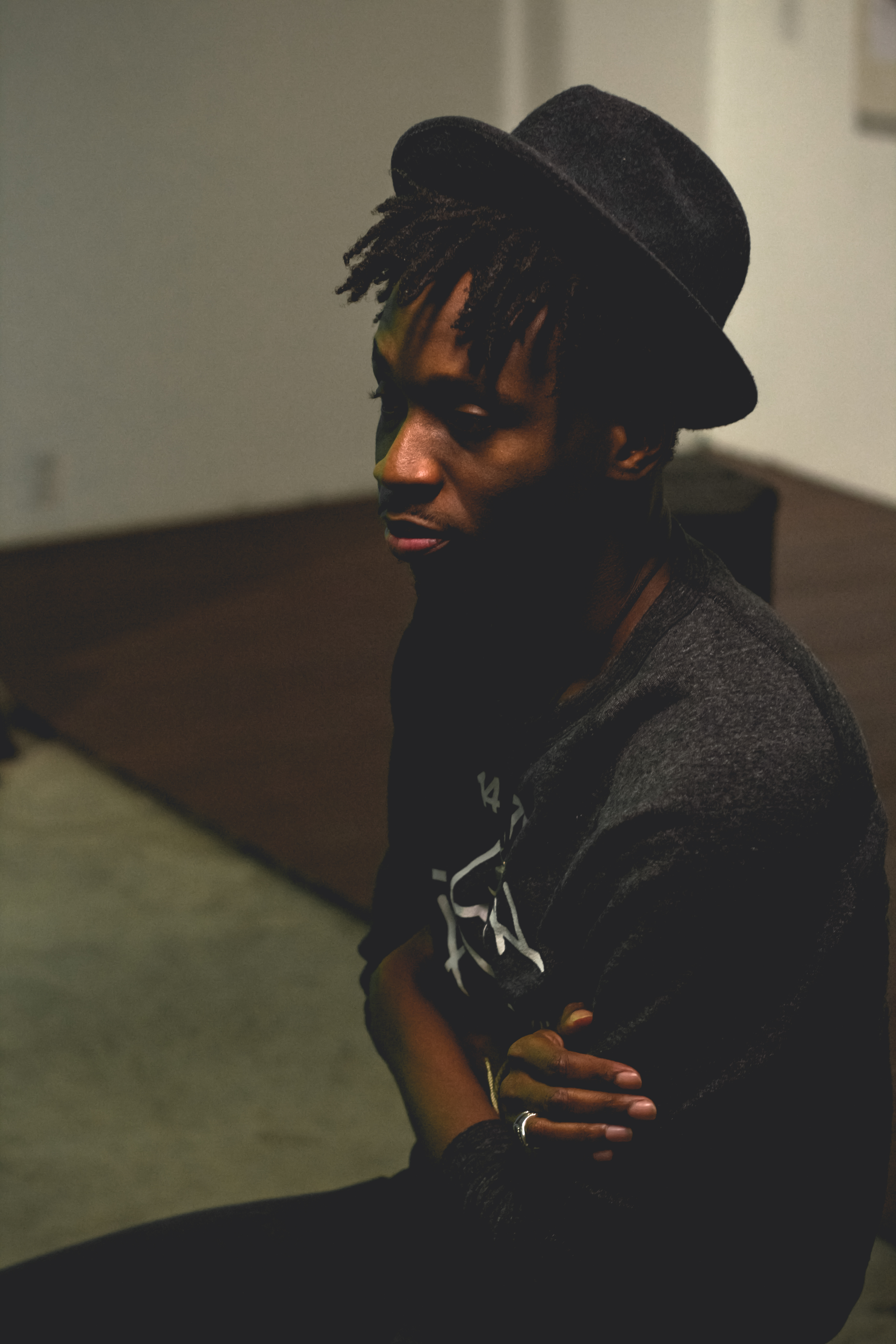

Background information
- Born: Kwaku Darko-Mensah Jr. Accra, Ghana
- Genres: R&B
- Occupations: Singer; songwriter; producer; artist; writer
- Years active: 2006–present
- Website: www.kaesunmusic.com

Kae Sun is the stage name of Kwaku Darko-Mensah Jr., a Ghanaian-born Canadian singer-songwriter, producer and artist.

== Early life ==
Kwaku was born in Accra, his parents had resettled in Ghana after being based in Germany for several years. He immigrated to Canada to study Columbia International College and later attended McMaster University graduating with a degree in Multimedia and Philosophy. In Accra he attended Achimota School where he first started writing and performing music.

== Career ==
While attending university, Kwaku started using the stage name Kae Sun, performing at local clubs and making demo recordings. He also started playing guitar and experimenting with different styles and sounds. He first gained some recognition when he was awarded a local music prize.

Kae Sun recorded and released his debut Lion on a Leash in 2009 largely funded by a grant from the Ontario Arts Council. He soon after re-located to Toronto, Ontario. Lion On A Leash was well received among critics, garnering further recognition for Kae Sun.

Kwaku followed up his debut with the EP Outside the Barcode, a folky, pared-down collection of songs inspired by his return to Ghana after years of living in Canada. The song Firefly Dance from this collection was a KCRW Top Tune of the day.

=== 2013–2015: Afriyie ===
Kae Sun's second LP Afriyie was released in May 2013 and was co-produced by Kae Sun and production duo Science! (Joshua Sadlier-Brown and Marc Koecher). The record received favourable reviews from publications like exclaim and Afropunk. An MTV Iggy profile of the record said, "With Afriyie, Kae Sun has managed to emerge as one of the most promising singer-songwriters in the international scene." The tour for Afriyie included a set at the inaugural CBC music festival, support for the Toronto stop of Janelle Monáe's Electric Lady Tour and solo engagements in Germany.

The song "Heart Healing Pulse" from Afriyie was included in the Strumbo Hundo 2013, television personality George Stroumboulopoulos's list of the top songs of that year. The Roots affiliated site OkayAfrica also lauded Afriyie as one of the best releases of 2013.

In April 2014, Kae Sun made his US debut at the Apollo Theatre in Harlem, as part of the theatre's Africa Now Festival.

"Ship and The Globe", the lead single from Afriyie is featured in several episodes of It's Okay, That's Love. The song debuted at number 3 on the South Korea Gaon International Chart.

Kae Sun has released a collaborative multimedia project featuring a short film and installation with art director Emeka Alams and German filmmaker Simon Rittmeier. The project included a 4-song E.P. released digitally.

=== 2018–present: Whoever Comes Knocking ===
Kae Sun released his third LP Whoever Comes Knocking on March 2, 2018. The LP features the singles Stalk and Treehouse.

== Discography ==
=== Studio albums ===
List of studio albums, with selected details
| Title | Album details |
|---|---|
| Lion on a Leash | Released: 2009; Label: Urbnet Records; Format: Digital download |
| Afriyie | Released: May 28, 2013; Label: Urbnet Records; Formats: Vinyl, digital download |
| Whoever Comes Knocking | Released: March 2, 2018; Label: Moonshine; Formats: Vinyl, digital download |

=== Compilation albums ===
List of compilation albums, with selected details
| Title | Album details |
|---|---|
| Ship and the Globe (special edition) | Released: 2014; Label: KdigitalMedia/Mnet; Formats: CD, digital download |

=== EPs ===
List of EPs, with selected details
| Title | EP details |
|---|---|
| Ghost Town Prophecy | Released: 2007; Label: Last Press; Format: Digital download |
| Outside the Barcode | Released: 2011; Label: File Under: Music; Format: Digital download |
| Oceans Apart | Release date: November 20, 2015; Label: File Under: Music; Formats: Digital download, cassette |
| Canary | Release date: March 10, 2017; Label: Moonshine; Formats: Digital download, streaming |

=== Singles ===
- "Lion on a Leash" (2009)
- "Ship and the Globe" (2012)
- "When the Pot" (2013)
- "Canary" (2016)
- "Flip the Rules" (2017)
- "Stalk" (2017)
- "Treehouse" (2018)
- "Bright Lights" (2021)

== Bibliography ==
- Flood Season (Flipped Eye, 2021) ISBN 9781905233762
