= Airport (album series) =

Studio album series by Moka Only
- Released: 2007–2012
- Genre: Hip-hop
- Labels: Legendary Entertainment; Wandering Worx; Urbnet Records

Airport is a series of six studio albums by Canadian rapper, singer and producer Moka Only, released annually from 2007 to 2012.

== Background ==
The idea for the series came after Moka took two nearly identical photos during different times of the day at an airport terminal in Montreal. He said "I noticed how the view and objects in it were seemingly unchanged. There was something mildly comical about it." The photo was used for the first release of the series.

== Conclusion ==
He spoke on the series ending in a 2024 UGS Mag interview, stating "I still have people asking me to do an Airport 7 and I think to myself, why? It lost its concept."

== Album listing ==
- Airport
  - Release date: April 22, 2007
    Reissued: June 28, 2007
  - Label: Legendary Entertainment
- Airport 2
  - Release date: April 1, 2008
  - Label: Legendary Entertainment
- Airport 3
  - Release date: April 21, 2009
  - Label: Legendary Entertainment
- Airport 4
  - Release date: July 13, 2010
  - Label: Legendary Entertainment
- Airport 5
  - Release date: April 14, 2011
  - Label: Legendary Entertainment and Wandering Worx
- Airport 6
  - Release date: September 18, 2012
  - Label: Urbnet Records
