= The Desired Effect (Moka Only album) =

Studio album by Moka Only
- Released: August 16, 2005
- Studios: Battleaxe Studios; Decoy Studios; Hipjoint Studios; Hipposonic Studios; Mammal Music Studios; The Warehouse Studio
- Genres: Hip-hop; pop
- Length: 43:47
- Labels: Battle Axe Records; Nettwerk
- Producers: Moka Only; The Matrix; K-os; Roger Swan; Sixtoo; Hipjoint Productions; Troy Samson; Oh No; J Dilla; Metty the Dert Merchant; Rob the Viking; Chin Injeti

Moka Only chronology
Lowdown Suite (2003)	The Desired Effect (2005)	Dirty Jazz (2005)

Singles from The Desired Effect
- 1. "Once Again" Released: 2005; 2. "More Soup" Released: December 11, 2021

The Desired Effect is a studio album by Canadian rapper, singer and producer Moka Only. It was released by Battle Axe Records and Nettwerk on August 16, 2005. The album was produced by Moka Only, The Matrix, K-os, Roger Swan, Sixtoo, Hipjoint Productions, Troy Samson, Oh No, J Dilla, Metty the Dert Merchant, Rob the Viking, Chin Injeti, and features guest appearances from Madchild, K-os, MF Doom, and S-Roc.

He premiered the album live on August 16 at the Casbah in Hamilton and August 18 at The Drake Hotel. In September, he performed the album at Concordia University.

One music video was released, for "Once Again", which appeared on the MuchMusic Top 30 Countdown multiple times from August–December 2005, peaking at number 13. It was also the number 4 most streamed video on MuchMusic from August 12–November 5, 2005. Additionally, the song reached number 24 on Radio & Records CHR/Pop Top 30 chart. The album reached number 15 on !earshot's hip-hop chart in September of 2005.

He once referred to the album as "The Not So Desired Effect" due to issues with Nettwerk. In a 2024 UGS Mag interview, he stated "I really had a lot of pressure and about halfway through the album it just became apparent, it wasn't really my album. Between my manager, the record label and other people, it kind of left my hands."

== Recording ==
Most of the album was recorded at Moka's personal studio, Mammal Music. The album was produced and mixed at a number of other studios including Vancouver's Battleaxe, Hipjoint, Hipposonic, The Warehouse and Los Angeles' Decoy.

Moka produced tracks for the album with a variety of synthesizers including a Korg Triton, Minimoog Voyager, Nord Lead 2, Six-Trak and Yamaha DX27, a Boss SP-303 sampler, an Akai MPC-2000XL workstation, a Roland VS-2480 multi-track recorder, as well as various percussion and trumpets.

Moka and Madchild recorded "Once Again" amid Swollen Members short-lived Virgin sessions. "Sitting On The Porch" was originally intended for an album with Madchild under the duo's name Perfect Strangers. Additionally, the chorus of the track "Hundred Grand" was an idea from Madchild, given to Moka during a phone call.

"More Soup" refers to a saying originated in New York. Moka explained "when somebody's trying to gas you up, blow up your head. If I was trying to lead you on in any way, or patronize you, I'd be souping you."

Though it was arranged for Moka to record with J Dilla in Detroit, he decided to stay at his home studio. He picked "One Time" from a selection of multiple beat CD's sent by Dilla. The song samples "Introduction" by Bel-Sha-Zaar. The same sample was used on Deee-Lite's "Groove Is in the Heart" in 1990, and Tyler the Creator's "I Ain't Got Time!" in 2017.

== Critical reception ==
Professional ratings
Review scores
Source	Rating
The Globe and Mail	2.5/5 stars
RapManiacz	4/5

Robert Gabriel of The Austin Chronicle said his "spacious self-production enhances his breezy lyricism".

Karen Bliss of Canadian Musician called the album "his most commercial sounding to date" and said "It's a bit funky, a bit jazzy, a bit soulful, a bit hip-hop, and entirely pop."

Matt Semamsky of Chart Attack claimed the album "reveals all of this Vancouver underground vet's strengths and weaknesses". He stated "Musically, it's a pure winner, with summery, jazz-flavoured beats" but expressed "Moka's Achilles heel remains his lyrical content".

Martin Turenne of The Georgia Straight called it "the anomaly" and "by far the slickest and most palatable offering of his career."

Robert Everett-Green of The Globe and Mail explained "Almost every track has something to bump you into a rhythm that feels like the best moments of a good party. Unfortunately, Moka the MC doesn't add much to the efforts of Moka the producer. His rhymes have little edge and less content."

Jason Richards of Now said it was his most "outgoing" and "accessible" album, noting the album's "strong pop aspect". He expressed the album was "so aurally polarized, it might not really help clarify his image", calling it "enjoyable but uneven".

RapManiacz said "his approach remains clean and fresh, the atmospheres are nice, relaxed" and noted the album was "very different from the darker collaborations that have seen him alongside the Swollen Members" with "a bit of madness and provocation".

In a negative review of the song "More Soup", Kevin MacLeven of Cokemachineglow called Moka "Canada's Nate Dogg" and compared Sixtoo's "cartoony loop and crisp drums" to Doom's production. He criticized Doom's "unmistakable mumbling drawl".

== Track listing ==
No.	Title	Producer(s)	Length
1.	"Once Again" (featuring Madchild)	The Matrix	2:44
2.	"Calling Out" (featuring K-os)	K-os; Roger Swan	3:40
3.	"Looking At The Ceiling"	Moka Only	3:35
4.	"More Soup" (featuring MF Doom)	Sixtoo	2:12
5.	"Hundred Grand"	Moka Only; Hipjoint Productions; Troy Samson	3:46
6.	"Keep Moving"	Oh No	2:59
7.	"Lady Gotta Place"	Moka Only	3:57
8.	"One Time"	J Dilla	3:12
9.	"Beautiful [Remix]"	Moka Only	3:52
10.	"Everybody Dance" (featuring S-Roc)	Metty the Dert Merchant; Moka Only; Hipjoint Productions; Troy Samson	3:48
11.	"Sitting On The Porch" (featuring Madchild)	Rob the Viking	3:35
12.	"Hold Me Close"	Moka Only	3:04
13.	"Beautiful"	Chin Injeti; Moka Only	3:23
Total length:			43:47

== Personnel ==
- Moka Only – vocals (tracks: 1–13), producer (tracks 3, 5, 7, 9, 10, 12, 13)
- Madchild – vocals (tracks: 1, 11)
- K-os vocals (track 2), producer (track 2)
- MF Doom – vocals (track 4)
- S-Roc – vocals (track 10)
- The Matrix (Scott Spock, Lauren Christy and Graham Edwards) – producer (track 1)
- Sixtoo – producer (track 4)
- Hipjoint Productions – producer (tracks: 5, 10)
- Troy Samson – producer (tracks: 5, 10)
- Oh No – producer, mixing (track 6)
- J Dilla – producer (track 8)
- Metty the Dert Merchant – producer (track 10)
- Rob the Viking – producer (track 11)
- Chin Injeti – producer (track 13)
- Russ Klyne – guitar (track 12)
- Roger Swan – mixing (tracks: 1–5, 7–13), producer (track 2)
- Amy Worobec – mixing (tracks: 1, 3–5, 7–13)
- Mike Cashin – mixing (track 2)
- Craig Waddel – mastering (tracks: 1–13)
