= CJLO =

Radio station of Concordia University in Montreal

- Montreal, Quebec; Canada
- Broadcast area: Greater Montreal
- Frequency: 1690 kHz

Programming
- Format: campus; community

Ownership
- Owner: Concordia Student Broadcasting Corporation

Technical information
- Class: C
- Power: 1,000 watts
- Transmitter coordinates: 45°26′52.08″N 73°39′28.08″W

Links
- Website: www.cjlo.com

CJLO is the official campus and community radio station for Concordia University in Montreal, Quebec and is operated almost entirely by its volunteer membership. The station broadcasts from the Loyola campus, and it can be heard at 1690 AM in Montreal, iTunes radio in the College/University category, the CJLO mobile app, or on the CJLO website.

CJLO started streaming online 7 days a week in early 2003, and the station began broadcasting by radio in the Montreal area on 1690 AM with 1000 watts of power in late 2008. The tower and transmitter are located in Lachine and the signal can be heard as far as Ottawa and Burlington, Vermont, United States.

CJLO was voted #1 Best Radio Station in Montreal in the Cult MTL Best of MTL Readers Poll 2022 and in 2026.

== History ==
The station was originally formed in 1998 from the merger of CRSG, a closed circuit station at Concordia's Sir George Williams Campus, and CFLI, a carrier current station at the Loyola Campus. It continued to broadcast by closed circuit until 2003, when it launched an Internet radio stream.

The station was granted a license by the Canadian Radio-television and Telecommunications Commission in 2006 to broadcast on the AM band at 1690, and began airing a testing signal in September 2008.

The station officially launched its on-air programming on October 15, 2008 with the song "Left of the Dial" by The Replacements.

On April 25, 2014, the CRTC published CJLO's application for a low-power FM retransmitter on 107.9 MHz, to alleviate reception issues downtown. The main concern with the use of 107.9 is potential interference from WVPS, the Vermont Public Radio flagship in Burlington. The application was denied by the CRTC on January 26, 2015, as they felt that there were no broadcasting deficiencies of the 1690 AM signal within its immediate broadcast area. WVPS, whose signal is not protected outside the United States, was not considered a factor in this decision.

== Programs ==
CJLO has over 70 original live programs with formats that include spoken-word and a variety of musical genres such as rock alternative, classical, hip-hop, jazz, experimental, metal, world beat, and more.

As of Winter 2016, the station currently airs the following:

- Aloof Future, hosted by Chubby
- Ashes to Ashes, hosted by Alex
- Anatomy of Caribbean Music, hosted by Gordon "Gee" Weekes
- At the Movies, hosted by Remi Caron-Liss
- Audio Penpals, hosted by DJ Littleforest and Friendz
- Autobeat, hosted by MNJIVR
- Beat the World, hosted by Kelly "Sugarface Nene" and Neil "Mr Lalla"
- Beats from the East, hosted by DJ Mister Vee
- Behind the Counter, hosted by Rebekah G. and Sonja H.
- Beyond The Black Rainbow, hosted by OCDJ.
- Beyond That Graveyard III, hosted by the K-Man
- Brave New Jams, hosted by Clifton Hanger
- Burnt Offerings, hosted by DJ Spacepirate
- BVST, hosted by Angelica
- Caribbean Callaloo, hosted by Raphael McKenzie (DJ 610), Pete Douglas, and Gordon "Gee" Weekes
- Champions of the Local Scene, hosted by the CJLO Volunteers
- Charts & Crafts, hosted by Dennis A. and Joana C.
- Cinema Smackdown, hosted by Tessipedia and Max
- Colours that can't be seen, hosted by Ozzdog
- Computer Sourire, hosted by Danilo
- Cornice Crow, hosted by Genaro PC
- Creators Chorus, hosted by Annick MF, Jess Glavina, and Teeana Munro
- Democracy Now, hosted by Amy Goodman
- Diggin' in the Crates, hosted by Lazy the selector and DJ Sleazy P
- Dirty Work, hosted by Denis A.
- Don't mess this up, Jacob, hosted by Jacob Greco
- Fatal Attraction, hosted by Patricia Petit Liang
- Floydian Slip, hosted by Craig Bailey
- Fukubukuro, hosted by DJ Lawrell
- Gospel Unlimited, hosted by Ray Johnston with research/talk facilitator Curtis, and produced by Tynesha
- Grade A Explosives, hosted by Andrew Wixq
- Hiway 1, hosted by Fredy Iuni
- Hooked on Sonics, hosted by Omar Sonics
- Into the Coven, hosted by Patrick McDowall
- In the Club, hosted by N. Gattuso
- Impossible Music, hosted by Gachary
- Je Suis TBA, hosted by Joana C.
- Jonny & Cupcakes, hosted by Sam Obrand and Jon Levine
- Local Everything, hosted by MC Jonny B
- Main Event Radio, hosted by Ryan Rider
- More Fyah, hosted by Junior Vibes and Singing P
- My Private HE.B.G.B.S, hosted by the K-Man
- Necromantik, hosted by DJ Necrotik and DJ Dreadkitten
- New Media and Politics 2.0, hosted by Karl Knox
- Nozin' Around, hosted by Emeline Vidal
- Phantastiq Cypha, hosted by Brian Döc Holidæ
- Psychic City, hosted by Abby S.
- Radio Fun, hosted by Idle Matt
- Rex's Barn Sessions, hosted by Rex Elroy Cliff
- Sewer Spewer, hosted by Chris the frog
- Something for the radio, hosted by D Shade and Redd Dredd
- Slax Trax, hosted by Zakary Slax
- Shibuya Crossing, hosted by Saturn De Los Angeles a.k.a. SATYYY.
- Sublime State of Doom, hosted by Sean
- The Belldog, hosted by Lucy
- The Commonwealth Conundrum, hosted by Rebecca Munroe and Danny Payne
- The F Hole, hosted by Erica Bridgeman
- The Go-Go Radio Magic Show, hosted by Oncle Ian and Prince Palu
- The Groove Master's Hour, hosted by Pete Douglas
- The Limelight, hosted by DJ Lady Oracle and J-Nice
- The Live Wire Show, hosted by Pete Douglas
- The Machine Stops, hosted by DJ Thinkbox
- The Noisy Loft, hosted by Orin Loft
- The Sound You Need, hosted by DJ Jeneva
- The Starting Rotation, hosted by Julian McKenzie, Robert Arzenshek, Giordano Cescutti, Daniele Iannarone, Justin Ferrara, and Matthew Shanahan
- The Trend, hosted by Camille and Krystal Christine
- The Vibe Room, hosted by MEL P a.k.a. DJ Lilmango
- Turn on the darkness, hosted by Philliam
- Vibe$tation, hosted by Mylestone
- World Beat News, hosted by Gordon "Gee" Weekes
- Waves of Honey, hosted by Honeydrip
- Yeti Dreams and Stranger Things, hosted by Stephanie Dee
- Whatever She Wants, hosted by Taina Nijimbere and Katherine Burgess

Some of CJLO's programs that aired in the past several years include:

- Best of the West, hosted by Sarah Stupar
- Chante Lakay, hosted by Schiller
- Countdown to Armageddon, hosted by Brian Hastie
- Currently Concordia, hosted by Melissa Mulligan and Nikita Smith
- Death Metal Disco Show, hosted by Emaciate Beats
- Digital Coffee, hosted by DJ Soykaff a.k.a. KNIGHT
- Exit Hour, hosted by Daniel Dixon
- Geek Soda, hosted by DJ Soykaff a.k.a. KNIGHT
- Glitch, Please, hosted by your best friend John Jacob
- Going Down Under, hosted by Tim Forster
- Greedy Graffiti, hosted by DJ Misschief
- Hayti Plus, hosted by Jean D.
- Haze World, hosted by Stephen K.
- Killer Baby Tomatoes, hosted by Colin Harris
- Fairest Dwellings, hosted by Alex Massé
- Fear of Music, hosted by Marshall V.
- Feel Good Hit of the Summer, hosted by C.W. MacGregor
- Funk Shui, hosted by Marina Minh Nguyen and Patricia Petit Liang
- Let the Rhythm Hit Em, hosted by Remission
- Midnight Love Affair, hosted by Mason Windels
- Morning Jazz Hour, hosted by Karl Knox
- Maiden Voyage, Hosted by Beansie Saretsky
- Onomatopoeia Show, hosted by Robin F
- Pits & Poisoned Apples, hosted by Serge Del Grosso
- Purple Carrot, hosted by Anna C.
- Revolution 33 1/3, hosted by Mack Mackenzie
- Salvation from Sin, hosted by DJ Michael Terzian a.k.a. Sinister
- Stroll Around the Groove, hosted by Julien B. and Mourad
- Station to Station, hosted by Ethan Ves
- Take 5, hosted by Connor McComb, a.k.a. DJ C-DADDY
- The Anglo-Franco Tango, hosted by Floraine Bonneville
- The Hypnotic, hosted by Yanissa
- The Kids Are So-So, hosted by DJ So-So
- The Link Radio, hosted by The Link, Concordia's independent newspaper
- The Reaktor, hosted by Abby Schachter
- The Sports Grind, hosted by Gerry Brossard Jr. and Grant Robinson
- The Midnight Caper, hosted by Kyle Fitzsimmons
- The New Noise, hosted by Runt
- The Game Misconduct, hosted by Google Guy, Phil, and Magg
- The Wake-Up Call, hosted by Carlo S.
- Twee Time, hosted by Stephanie Pastel
- With Gay Abandon, hosted by Julie, a.k.a. OCDJ

== Awards and honours ==
CJLO is a station that has received multiple nominations and wins at the CMJ Music Marathon College Radio Awards since 2008. The station was consistently voted as one of the top-ten Best Radio Stations in The Montreal Mirror's Best of Montreal Readers Poll.

=== CMJ College Radio Awards ===
Year	Award
2008	Best Student Run, Non-FM Radio Station
2008	Best Team Effort
2009	Best Team Effort
2010	Station of the Year
2010	Best Use of Limited Resources
2010	Best Team Effort
2012	Biggest Champion of the Local Scene

=== Montreal Mirror Best of Montreal Readers Poll ===
Year	Rank
2008	Honorable mention
2009	8
2010	6
2011	6
2012	6

=== Other ===
In 2010, CJLO was ranked as one of the best college radio stations by the Huffington Post and was the only Canadian radio station selected to attend the First Annual International Radio Festival in Zurich, Switzerland. In 2013, CJLO was voted the second Best Radio Station in the CultMTL Best of MTL Readers Poll. In 2022, CJLO was voted #1 Best Radio Station in Montreal in the CultMTL Best of MTL Readers Poll. In 2025, CJLO was voted the second Best Radio Station in the CultMTL Best of MTL Readers Poll.
