= DL Incognito =

Hip hop rapper and producer

- Born: Oliver Nestor
- Origin: Ottawa, Ontario
- Genres: Hip hop
- Occupations: Rapper, record producer
- Years active: 1999-present
- Labels: Urbnet Records, Nine Planets Hip Hop, Universal Music Canada, Orng Peel Laab
- Website: dlincognito.bandcamp.com

Oliver Nestor, better known as DL Incognito, is a Canadian rapper and producer from Ottawa, Ontario. He is of Haitian and French-Canadian descent. He previously signed a distribution deal with Urbnet Records but also operated his independent label Nine Planets Hip Hop along with his brother. In 2007 and 2009, he was nominated for a Juno for Best Rap Recording.

== Career ==
DL first started his career in 1999 when he appeared on the Nine Planets Hip Hop compilation Welcome To The Land Of The Lost.

His first solo release was his 2002 release, A Sample and a Drum Machine. Two years later, he released the album Life's a Collection of Experiences.

In 2006, he released Organic Music for a Digital World. Rowald Pruyn of RapReviews gave the album a very favorable 8.5/10, saying "DL Incognito, whose name he interprets as 'delivering lyrics on the down low,' has skills on the mic which are surpassed only by his ability for self-reflection." The album received a Juno nomination.

Following this, he released A Captured Moment in Time in 2008, which like his last albums, also received a Juno nomination.

In 2013, he released the album Someday Is Less Than a Second Away, which features D-Sisive, along with others. Exclaim! gave the album a very favorable review and Chayne Japal said: "His recent efforts have resulted in a fifth album, Someday is Less than a Second Away, a tight, potent record that utilizes his and his collaborators' strengths."

The name 'DL Incognito' means "Delivering Lyrics on the Low". DL Incognito said in an interview that his main goal is "just trying to give Canadian hip-hop an identity." In another interview, he said what inspires him to rap is life: "Life inspires me, all the ups & downs that people go through, current events, happiness, pain, everything is an inspiration. As I continue on this journey I've realized that life's a collection of experiences and my albums are captured moments in time."

== Discography ==
=== Solo albums ===
- A Sample and a Drum Machine
  - Released: July 23, 2002
  - Label: Nine Planets Hip Hop
- Life's a Collection of Experiences
  - Released: November 23, 2004
  - Label: Nine Planets Hip Hop
- Organic Music for a Digital World
  - Released: June 20, 2006
  - Label: Universal Music Canada/Urbnet Records
- A Captured Moment in Time
  - Released: April 8, 2008
  - Label: Nine Planets Hip Hop/Urbnet Records
- Someday Is Less Than a Second Away
  - Released: April 16, 2013
  - Label: Urbnet Records
- What Once Was Will Never Be
  - Released: December 2, 2022
  - Label: Orng Peel Laab

=== Singles ===
- "Rugged Raw"
- "Spit Forever 2"
- "Proof"
- "Verbalerity"
- "Live In My Element"
- "Make a Difference"
- "Air Play"
