= The Oddities (rap group) =

- Origin: Toronto, Ontario, Canada
- Genre: Rap
- Years active: 1998–present
- Members: Bookworm; J-StaRRRrrr!!!; Sny-Whip; JSN JNS; Psy; Wysper

The Oddities are a Canadian rap group from Toronto, Ontario. Members include Bookworm, J-StaRRRrrr!!!, Sny-Whip, JSN JNS, Psy, and Wysper.

== History ==
Rap groups Awkward Why? and Dynasty began recording in 1996, and merged in 1998 to form the Oddities.

Oddities members have released a number of collaborative projects over the years, including in 2001 a 12" single, "Weak Days". Over time, other individuals participated in the group, including Kenny Neal (aka Bounce), Paul (pka Change), Naterrell, Retro Mosquito, and Bodible Oddities dancers Glizzii & Three (pka Daze).

The group's debut "family album", which showcased its members, was entitled The Scenic Route, and was released on Battle Axe Records in 2003. Bookworm produced the album.

== Selected discography ==
- Alpha Flight EP (Dynasty) – 1996
- "Sprawl Xtreme: False Teeth" (Bookworm) maxi-single – 1997
- Claustrophonics – 1997
- Six Bubbles (Awkward Why?) – 1998
- Snidley's Lunchbox EP – 1998
- "Sprawlic Stream: Rites of Passage" (Bookworm) – 1999
- "Paying for the Trip" (Bookworm) – 2000
- "Weak Days" b/w "Pickup Rhyme" & "Hookers 'n Gin" 12" single – 2001
- The Scenic Route – 2003
- Rain All Day EP (The Nope: Psy & Moka Only) maxi-single – 2009
- "N.I.N.E." (Beatface: Book & Paul) – 2009
- Melba (The Nope) – 2009
- AMY (Beatface: Book & Paul) – 2011
- Sinus EP (The Nope) – 2014
- Extended PlayPen (Davepsy) – 2017
- Beyond the Arc (Davepsy) – 2020
- Here's the Thing EP (Davepsy) – 2025
- Fivewards EP (Davepsy) – 2026

== Appearances ==
- Jacked Surfing DVD
- Muskoka Militia Vol. II (2004)
- CBC Radio 3 – Just Concerts (2003)
