= Martian Xmas =

Studio album series by Moka Only
- Released: 2007–2025
- Recorded: 2004–2025
- Genre: Hip-hop
- Labels: Legendary Entertainment; Domination Recordings; Feelin' Music; Urbnet Records

Martian Xmas is a series of winter themed studio albums by Canadian rapper, singer and producer Moka Only. The first release was Martian Xmas 2004 on January 9, 2007. Later in 2007, he released 2006 and 2007 editions. Martian Xmas 2005 remained unreleased until 2015. The releases in 2019 and 2020 were simply named Martian. The series has totaled 22 releases, the most recent in 2025.

The series is loosely based on the holiday season, and has sampled a number of Christmas related sounds including Alvin and the Chipmunks, German caroling, King of the Hill holiday episodes, a Peanuts special, and sleigh bells.

In January 2015, he toured Martian Xmas 2014 through Calgary, Edmonton, Kelowna and Castlegar.

== Background ==
The name Martian Xmas was suggested by Madchild in the Summer of 2004, after Moka drew a "funny looking alien character". The first album of the series was recorded in August 2004. Moka said "It was a concept project the first time around based on an extra terrestrial who visits earth every Xmas to study human behavior."

== Album listing ==
- Martian Xmas 2004
  - Release date: January 9, 2007
  - Label: Legendary Entertainment
- Martian Xmas 2006
  - Release date: December 11, 2007
  - Label: Legendary Entertainment
- Martian Xmas 2007
  - Release date: December 11, 2007
  - Label: Legendary Entertainment
- Martian Xmas 2008
  - Release date: December 9, 2008
    Reissued: 2009
  - Label: Legendary Entertainment
- Martian Xmas 2009
  - Release date: December 15, 2009
  - Label: Domination Recordings
- Martian Xmas 2010
  - Release date: December 7, 2010
  - Label: Legendary Entertainment
- Martian Xmas 2011
  - Release date: December 22, 2011
  - Label: Feelin' Music
- Martian Xmas 2012
  - Release date: December 11, 2012
  - Label: Urbnet Records
- Martian Xmas 2013
  - Release date: December 10, 2013
  - Label: Urbnet Records
- Martian Xmas 2014
  - Release date: December 2, 2014
  - Label: Urbnet Records
- Martian Xmas 2005
  - Release date: December 11, 2015
  - Label: Urbnet Records
- Martian Xmas 2015
  - Release date: December 11, 2015
  - Label: Urbnet Records
- Martian Xmas 2016
  - Release date: November 29, 2016
  - Label: Urbnet Records
- Martian Xmas 2017
  - Release date: December 15, 2017
  - Label: Urbnet Records
- Martian Xmas 2018
  - Release date: December 14, 2018
  - Label: Urbnet Records
- Martian 2019
  - Release date: December 20, 2019
  - Label: Urbnet Records
- Martian 2020
  - Release date: December 18, 2020
  - Label: Urbnet Records
- Martian Xmas 2021
  - Release date: December 10, 2021
  - Label: Urbnet Records
- Martian Xmas 2022
  - Release date: December 9, 2022
  - Label: Urbnet Records
- Martian Xmas 2023
  - Release date: December 15, 2023
  - Label: Urbnet Records
- Martian Xmas 2024
  - Release date: December 6, 2024
  - Label: Urbnet Records
- Martian Xmas 2025
  - Release date: December 12, 2025
  - Label: Urbnet Records
