= Earshot Radio Chart =

Canadian radio chart

- Formation: 1999
- Type: National radio chart
- Location: Canada
- Owner: National Campus and Community Radio Association (NCRA)
- Website: earshot-online.com

The Earshot Radio Chart (also known as the !earshot chart or !earshot Radio Report) is the Canadian national music chart based on airplay reports from campus and community radio stations. The chart is headed by the National Campus and Community Radio Association (NCRA), and participating stations submit regular reports that are compiled into national and specialty charts. It launched in 1999 as a part of Exclaim! magazine.

== Background ==
The Earshot chart is part of the broader Canadian campus-radio system in which station-level charts have long been used to document and promote music played on campus radio. Brian Fauteux's Music in Range: The Culture of Canadian Campus Radio discusses the role of weekly charts at CHMA and the historical use of album and singles charts by CiTR and its publication Discorder.

The Earshot charts have also been discussed in academic research. The Oxford Handbook of Radio and Podcasting discusses the compilation and sharing of Canadian campus-radio programming through !earshot charts and analyzes the monthly !earshot Top 100 albums as a dataset. In 2008, The Globe and Mail journalist Robert Everett-Green discussed the importance of Canadian college-radio airplay to the Polaris Music Prize. He reported that seven of the ten albums shortlisted for the 2008 prize had reached the top ten of the national Earshot album charts, and described the national chart as being based on reports from NCRA member stations across Canada.

The Earshot chart operates within the wider network of Canadian campus and community radio represented by the NCRA. Contemporary and historical accounts of the sector have documented the association's role and the importance of campus radio as an independent national broadcasting network.

== See also ==
- Campus radio
- Canadian content
- Music of Canada
- Record chart
