= The Bill Murray EP =

EP by Sweatshop Union
- Released: March 1, 2011
- Recorded: Late 2010, Early 2011; Creativ Recording Studios
- Genre: Hip hop
- Label: Urbnet Records

Sweatshop Union chronology
Water Street (2008)	The Bill Murray EP (2011)

Professional ratings
Review scores
Source	Rating
TheComeUpShow	8/10
RapReviews	8/10
ScratchedVinyl	7/10

The Bill Murray EP is an EP released by Canadian hip hop group Sweatshop Union on March 1, 2011. It won "Best Rap/Hip-hop Recording" at the 2011 Western Canadian Music Awards.

== Track listing ==
1. "Intro" - 0:41
2. "Makeshift Kingdom" - 3:01
3. "Sunburn" - 2:37
4. "Bring Back the Music (feat. D-Sisive)" - 3:17
5. "Nuclear Family" - 3:42
6. "Bill Murray" - 2:59
7. "John Lennon" - 2:49
8. "Staring at the Walls (Too Late)" - 3:57

== Personnel ==
Credits for The Bill Murray EP adapted from liner notes.

- Conscience - Writer, Production,
- Metty The Dert Merchant - Writer, Production
- Mos Eisley - Writer, Production
- Dusty - Writer, Production
- Marmalade - Writer, Production
- D-Sisive - Writer, Featured Artist
- Preme Diesel - Writer, Production, Programming
- Dave Knill - Writer, Production, Programming
- Jamie Kuse - Engineer, Production, Mixing
- DJ Itchy Ron - Scratching
