= Vaudeville (disambiguation) =

Vaudeville was a theatrical genre of variety entertainment in the United States and Canada from the early 1880s until the early 1930s.

Vaudeville may also refer to:

== Arts and entertainment ==
- Comédie en vaudevilles, called in English simply "a vaudeville", a theatrical entertainment which began in Paris in the 17th century and continued into the 19th century
- Vaudeville (song), a type of 17th- and 18th-century French satirical poem
- Vaudeville (album), a 2010 album by Canadian rapper D-Sisive
- Vaudeville Theatre, a London theatre
- Vaudeville Villain, a 2003 album by British-American rapper MF Doom under the psuedynom "Viktor Vaughn"

== Places ==
- Vaudeville, Meurthe-et-Moselle, a commune in the Meurthe-et-Moselle department, France
- Vaudéville, a village and commune in the Vosges département, France
