= Pigeon Hole (band) =

Canadian hip hop group

- Origin: Vancouver, British Columbia, Canada
- Genres: hip hop
- Years active: 2000–2013
- Label: Urbnet Records
- Members: Dusty Melo; Marmalade

Pigeon Hole is a Canadian hip hop group from Vancouver. They were previously known as "Creative Minds". The duo consists of Colin "Dusty Melo" McCue and Lee "Marmalade" Napthine, who are also members of the band Sweatshop Union.

== History ==
McCue and Napthine began jamming together in 1993 while still in school in their hometown of Nanaimo. They began performing on the Vancouver hip hop scene as "Creative Minds" and collaborated with Dirty Circus to release both of their first album Wildlife Canada. Later on Dirty Circus and Pigeon Hole joined the collective Sweatshop Union with some other local Vancouver hip-hop artists. The pair released their first album as a duo, Age Like Astronauts, in 2010 on URBNET Records. It was one of three albums released on the same day by side projects of Sweatshop Union, alongside Dirty Circus's Alive and Well and Trillionaire$' By Hook or by Crook. It appeared on the EarShot campus and community radio hip hop chart in August that year.

The album features collaborations with D-Sisive, Moka Only and their Sweatshop Union colleagues DJ Itchy Ron and Mos Eisley and was nominated for the 2011 WCMA rap recording of the year.

After releasing an EP in 2011, in 2013 Pigeon Hole released a second album, Chimp Blood.

== Discography ==
- 2000 Wildlife Canada (as "Creative Minds" in collaboration with Dirty Circus)
- 2010 Age Like Astronauts
- 2011 Sunday Remixes free EP
- 2013 Chimp Blood
