= Natural Progression =

Studio album by Sweatshop Union
- Released: October 7, 2003
- Recorded: April 19, 2003 – May 27, 2003
- Studios: Hipposonic Studios (Vancouver, BC); Dub Vibe Studios
- Genre: Hip-hop
- Length: 1:02:53
- Label: Battle Axe Records
- Producers: Bookworm; Conscience; Dusty Melodica; Metty The Dert Merchant; Kyprios; Mos Eisley; Mr. Marmalade; Rob The Viking; Tawgs Salter

Sweatshop Union chronology
Local 604 (2002)	Natural Progression (2003)	United We Fall (2005)

Professional ratings
Review scores
Source	Rating
AllMusic	2.5/5 stars
Now	4/5 Ns
RapReviews	8/10

Natural Progression is the second studio album by Canadian hip-hop group Sweatshop Union. It was released on October 7, 2003 via Battle Axe Records. Production was handled by Mos Eisley, Rob The Viking, Mr. Marmalade, Bookworm, Dusty Melodica, Tawgs Salter, Kyprios, Conscience, and Metty The Dert Merchant, with co-producer Daniel Elmes. It features one guest appearance from Moka Only on the song “Better Days”, which peaked at #23 on the MuchMusic Top 30 Countdown in August of 2004.

At the Juno Awards of 2004, the album was nominated for a Juno Award for Rap Recording of the Year. The album was also nominated for Western Canadian Music Awards Outstanding Rap/Hip-Hop Recording in 2004.

== Track listing ==
No.	Title	Producer(s)	Length
1.	"The Answer"	Mos Eisley	2:39
2.	"Radio Edit"	Rob The Viking	3:16
3.	"News Flash"		0:21
4.	"I Got News"	Rob The Viking; Tawgs Salter; Kyprios (co.)	4:03
5.	"Don't Be Afraid"	Mos Eisley	3:59
6.	"Better Days" (featuring Moka Only)	Bookworm	3:15
7.	"Today"	Rob The Viking; Daniel Elmes (co.)	3:33
8.	"Us"	Mr. Marmalade	3:06
9.	"Truman Show"	Mr. Marmalade; Daniel Elmes (co.)	3:06
10.	"Baho Ang Titi Mo"	Dusty Melodica	1:31
11.	"On the Sly"	Rob The Viking	3:41
12.	"P.O.T.B."	Mos Eisley	3:50
13.	"Garbage Love Songs & Cheesy Jingles"	Metty the Dert Merchant	3:35
14.	"The Way"	Rob The Viking	4:12
15.	"Stolen Memories"	Tawgs Salter; Kyprios	4:20
16.	"Any Reason"	Bookworm	3:04
17.	"The Thing About It"	Conscience	4:24
18.	"The Question (Outro)"	Mr. Marmalade; Dusty Melodica	6:58
Total length:			1:02:53
