= Let the Children Die =

Studio album by D-Sisive
- Released: May 3, 2009
- Genre: Alternative hip hop
- Length: 55:16
- Label: Urbnet Records

D-Sisive chronology
The Book (2008)	Let the Children Die (2009)	Jonestown (2009)

Professional ratings
Review scores
Source	Rating
RapReviews	9/10
Vice	(positive)

Let the Children Die is a 2009 album by Canadian hip hop artist D-Sisive. The album was produced by Muneshine, Norman Krates and The Arkeoligists. Guest features include Classified, 9th Uno, Little Vic, Muneshine, Conscience, Krypios, Buck 65 and Guilty Simpson.

== Reception ==
The album was nominated for a 2009 Polaris Music Prize. "Nobody With a Notepad" won a 2012 Juno Award for rap recording of the year and Socan's ECHO songwriting award in 2009.

== Track listing ==
No.	Title	Producer	Length
1.	"Introduction"	Orin Isaacs, D-Sisive	3:29
2.	"Switzerland"	DJ Alibi	3:12
3.	"Let The Children Die"	MoSS	3:34
4.	"Nobody With A Notepad"	Muneshine	3:39
5.	"Father"	Bird	4:31
6.	"Back Then"	Muneshine	2:04
7.	"Song To Sing"	Norman Krates	2:52
8.	"Riot I Caused" (featuring Classified)	Scam	3:40
9.	"I See" (featuring 9th Uno, Little Vic, Muneshine)	Muneshine	4:38
10.	"Questions"	Arythmetic	2:09
11.	"Glorious"	Muneshine	3:52
12.	"Bees With You (Skit)"	Orin Isaacs, D-Sisive	0:57
13.	"Mr. Daydream"	Bird	3:26
14.	"High School Cool" (featuring Conscience, Kyprios)	Muneshine	3:36
15.	"The Stars"	The Arkeologists	2:16
16.	"Die In Amsterdam"	Orin Isaacs, D-Sisive	2:54
17.	"The Superbowl Is Over" (featuring Buck 65)	DJ Alibi	4:31
18.	"Like This (Bonus Track)" (featuring Guilty Simpson)	Muneshine	3:32
19.	"Wonderful World (Bonus Track)"	Orin Isaacs, D-Sisive	4:26
