= Longchamp, Vosges =

Longchamp
- Commune
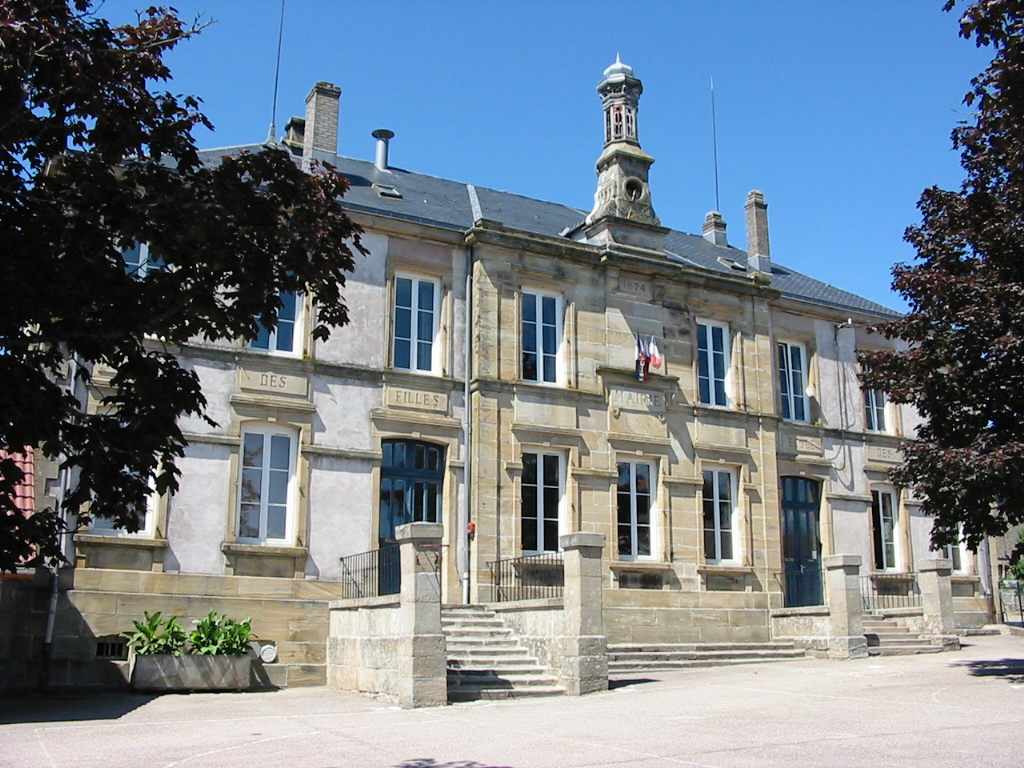
- Town hall and school built in 1874

- Coat of arms
- Location of Longchamp
- Location within France Location within Grand Est
- Coordinates: 48°13′32″N 6°30′51″E
- Country: France
- Region: Grand Est
- Department: Vosges
- Arrondissement: Épinal
- Canton: Épinal-2
- Intercommunality: CA Épinal

Government
  - Mayor (2020–2026): Émilie Sivadon
- Area^{1}: 10.26 km^{2} (3.96 sq mi)
- Elevation: 360 m (1,180 ft)
- Highest elevation: 395 m (1,296 ft)
- Lowest elevation: 336 m (1,102 ft)
- Population (2023): 459
  - Density: 44.7/km^{2} (116/sq mi)
- Time zone: UTC+01:00 (CET)
  - Summer (DST): UTC+02:00 (CEST)
- INSEE/Postal code: 88273 /88000
- ^{1} French Land Register data, which excludes lakes, ponds, glaciers > 1 km^{2} (0.386 sq mi or 247 acres) and river estuaries.

Longchamp (French pronunciation: [lɔ̃ʃɑ̃]) is a commune in the Vosges department in Grand Est in northeastern France.

== See also ==
- Communes of the Vosges department
