= Archettes =

- Commune
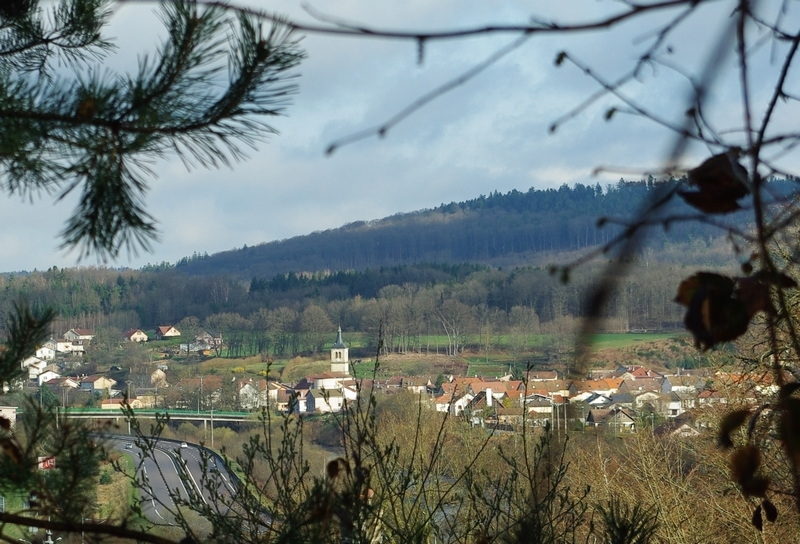
- A general view of Archettes

- Coat of arms
- Location of Archettes
- Location within France Location within Grand Est
- Coordinates: 48°07′32″N 6°32′08″E
- Country: France
- Region: Grand Est
- Department: Vosges
- Arrondissement: Épinal
- Canton: Épinal-2
- Intercommunality: CA Épinal

Government
  - Mayor (2020–2026): Patrick Georges
- Area^{1}: 13.93 km^{2} (5.38 sq mi)
- Highest elevation: 505 m (1,657 ft)
- Lowest elevation: 338 m (1,109 ft)
- Population (2023): 1,113
  - Density: 79.90/km^{2} (206.9/sq mi)
- Time zone: UTC+01:00 (CET)
  - Summer (DST): UTC+02:00 (CEST)
- INSEE/Postal code: 88012 /88380
- ^{1} French Land Register data, which excludes lakes, ponds, glaciers > 1 km^{2} (0.386 sq mi or 247 acres) and river estuaries.

Archettes (French pronunciation: [aʁʃɛt]; German: Erzett) is a commune in the Vosges department in Grand Est in northeastern France.

== See also ==
- Communes of the Vosges department
