= Jonestown (D-Sisive album) =

Studio album by D-Sisive
- Released: November 18, 2009
- Genre: Hip hop
- Length: 38:43
- Label: Urbnet Records

D-Sisive chronology
Let the Children Die (2009)	Jonestown (2009)	Vaudeville (2010)

Jonestown is an album by Canadian hip hop artist D-Sisive. Released in 2009, the album was D-Sisive's second full-length release that year after Let the Children Die, and was made available for a free digital download. The album art features a jug of Kool-Aid, an allusion to the phrase "drinking the Kool-Aid", which originated from the 1978 Jonestown massacre.

== Critical reception ==
Chris Dart of Exclaim! reviewed the album positively, calling it "alternately head-nodding, creepy and darkly humorous", and writing that it "marks a high point for [D-Sisive], and is hopefully a sign of even bigger things to come."

== Track listing ==
No.	Title	Length
1.	"In the Jungle"	3:36
2.	"West Coast"	3:44
3.	"One Way Ticket"	3:26
4.	"Around the World" (feat. Slim Twig)	2:55
5.	"Ken Park"	2:50
6.	"1974"	3:49
7.	"Boom Baba Boom"	2:59
8.	"Believe"	3:05
9.	"They Got Guns" (feat. Muneshine)	2:59
10.	"The Elephant Dance"	3:36
11.	"The Truth Is..."	2:37
12.	"One Way Ticket (moss:rmx)"	3:07
Total length:		38:43
