= Ghettosocks =

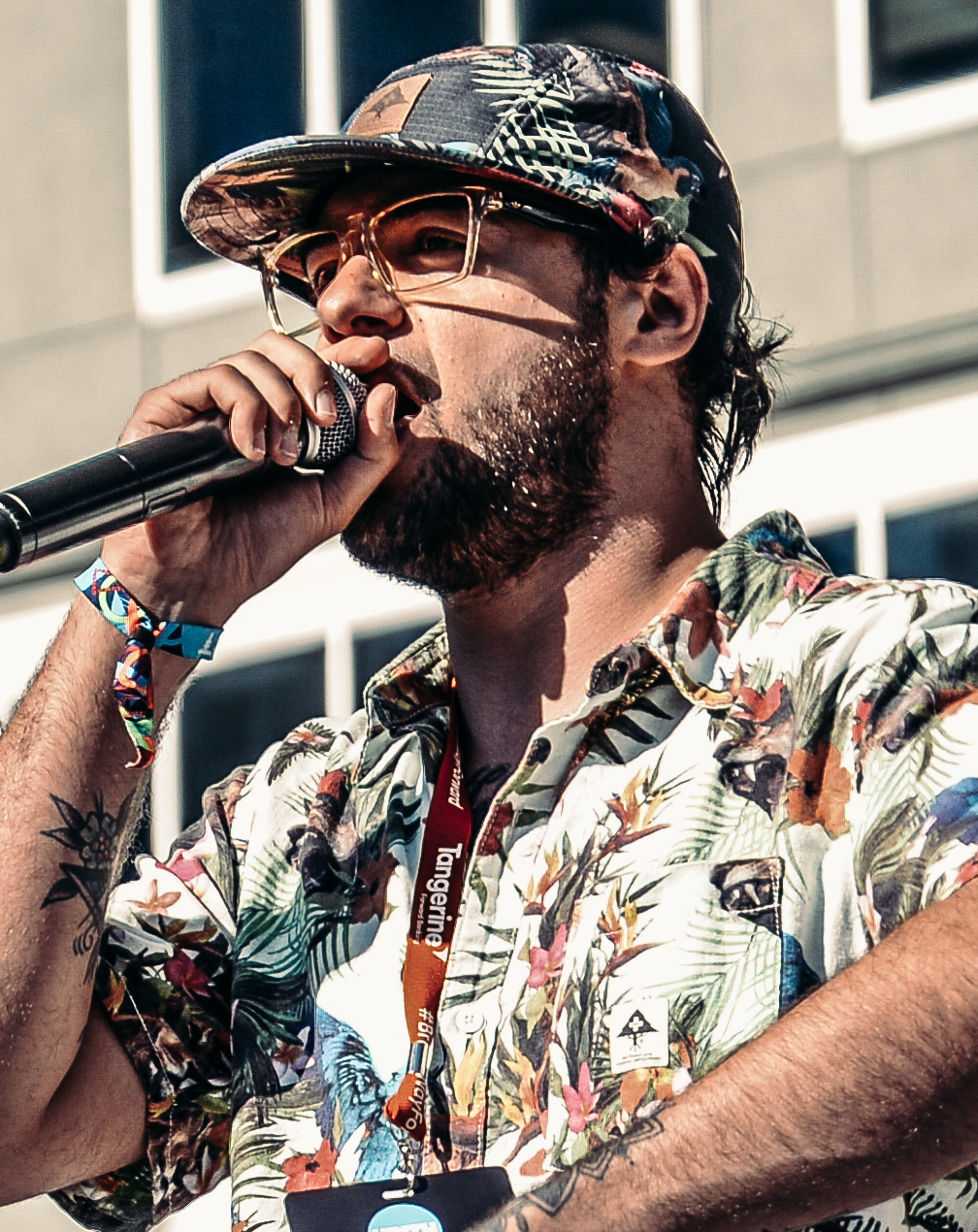
- Ghettosocks in 2016.

Background information
- Born: Darren Pyper; Ottawa, Ontario, Canada
- Origin: Halifax, Nova Scotia, Canada
- Genre: Hip-hop
- Occupations: Rapper; record producer
- Years active: 2001–present
- Labels: Droppin' Science; Backburner; Alpha Flight; Hand'Solo; Black Buffalo
- Member of: Backburner
- Formerly of: Alpha Flight; Teenburger; Wolves
- Website: ghettosocks.com

Darren Pyper, better known by his stage name Ghettosocks, is a Canadian rapper and record producer. He is a member of the Backburner collective. CBC Music ranked him number 24 on their list of "The 25 Greatest Canadian Rappers".

== Career ==
Following the self-released album Zoo School in 2003, he released Battle Royale with the group Alpha Flight in 2005. In 2006, he attained a media arts degree from NSCAD University. Also in 2006, he released Get Some Friends, which debuted at number 1 on Chart Attack and !earshot hip-hop charts in 2007, and ranked number 1 on !earshot's 2007 year-end hip-hop chart.

His 2009 solo album Treat of the Day spent several weeks at number 1 on Chart Attack's hip-hop chart in early 2010. The album was nominated for Rap Recording of the Year at the Juno Awards of 2011 and the single "Don't Turn Around" won Rap/Hip‐Hop Single Track Recording of the Year at the 2011 East Coast Music Awards.

In 2011, he released collaborative albums with Backburner and Teenburger, with Timbuktu. He has also released multiple collaborations with DJ Jon Deck, starting with We're Gonna Drink A Lot of Wine This Year, Boys in 2012. In 2013, he released the solo album For You Pretty Things, and the collaborative album Wolves with Bix, D-Sisive, Muneshine, and Timbuktu.

His 2017 collaborative album with Kin Size Slim, Diamants en cendres, was nominated for Rap/Hip-Hop Recording of the Year at the 2018 East Coast Music Awards. In 2022, he released Listen to the Masters with DK.

He performed at the 2011 Canada Winter Games, South by Southwest in 2014, and the 2015 Pan American Games.

== Discography ==
=== Solo ===
- Zoo School (2003)
- Get Some Friends (2006)
- Treat of the Day (2009)
- For You Pretty Things (2013)

=== Collaborations ===
- Battle Royale (with DJ Y-Rush, Jabba the Kutt, and Mr. Bix, as Alpha Flight) (2005)
- I Can Make Your Dog Famous (with DJ Jorun Bombay) (2008)
- We're Gonna Drink A Lot of Wine This Year, Boys. (with DJ Jon Deck) (2012)
- Wolves (2013) (with Bix, D-Sisive, Muneshine, and Timbuktu, as Wolves)
- We're Gonna Drink A Lot of Wine This Year, Boys. 2 (with DJ Jon Deck) (2015)
- Hip Hop & Big Beat (with Ralph Lamb and Andrew Ross) (2016)
- Diamants en cendres (with Kin Size Slim) (2017)
- The Octagon (with Swamp Thing) (2017)
- Animalia (with DJ Jon Deck) (2020)
- Listen to the Masters (with DK) (2022)

=== with Backburner ===
- Big Talk (2001)
- Heatwave (2011)
- Eclipse (2015)
- Continuum (2022)

=== as Teenburger with Timbuktu ===
- Burgertime (with DJ Jorun Bombay) (2011)
- Hivemind (with The Herbaliser) (2017)

== See also ==
- Canadian hip hop
