= La Baffe =

- Commune
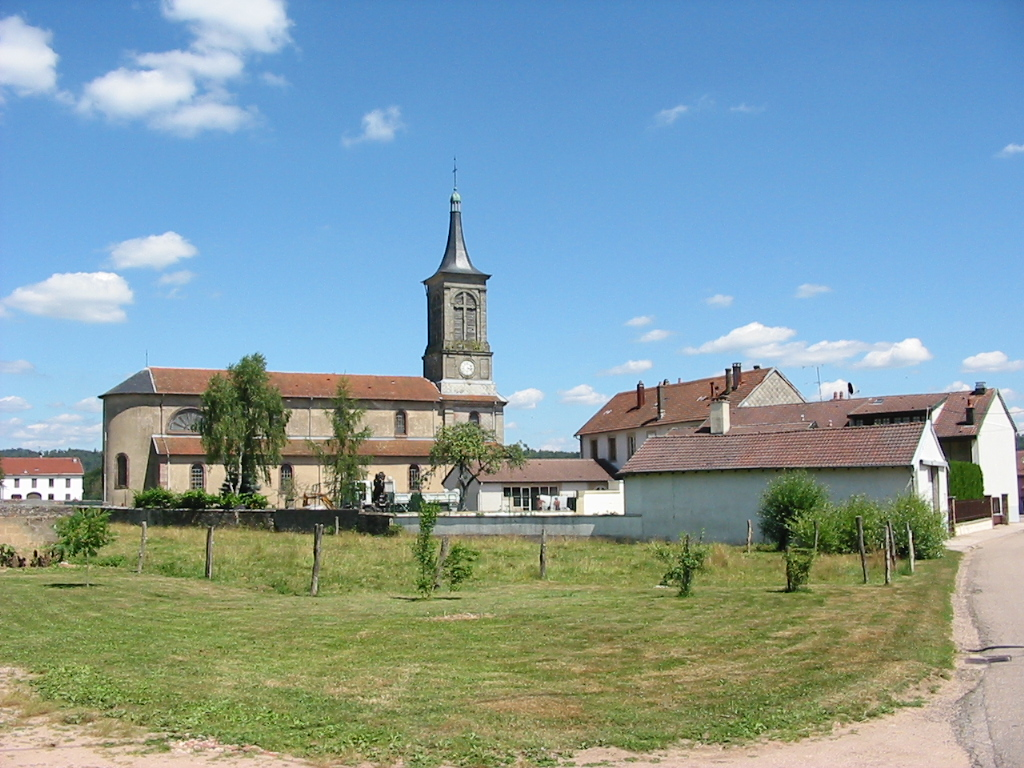
- The church and surroundings in La Baffe
- Location of La Baffe
- Location within France Location within Grand Est
- Coordinates: 48°09′40″N 6°34′21″E
- Country: France
- Region: Grand Est
- Department: Vosges
- Arrondissement: Épinal
- Canton: Épinal-2
- Intercommunality: CA Épinal

Government
  - Mayor (2020–2026): Daniel Lagarde
- Area^{1}: 9.01 km^{2} (3.48 sq mi)
- Highest elevation: 489 m (1,604 ft)
- Lowest elevation: 365 m (1,198 ft)
- Population (2023): 631
  - Density: 70.0/km^{2} (181/sq mi)
- Time zone: UTC+01:00 (CET)
  - Summer (DST): UTC+02:00 (CEST)
- INSEE/Postal code: 88028 /88460
- ^{1} French Land Register data, which excludes lakes, ponds, glaciers > 1 km^{2} (0.386 sq mi or 247 acres) and river estuaries.

La Baffe (French pronunciation: [la baf]) is a commune in the Vosges department in Grand Est in northeastern France.

== See also ==
- Communes of the Vosges department
