= Château de Failloux =

Château in Vosges département, France

Coordinates: 48°11′09″N 6°29′03″E

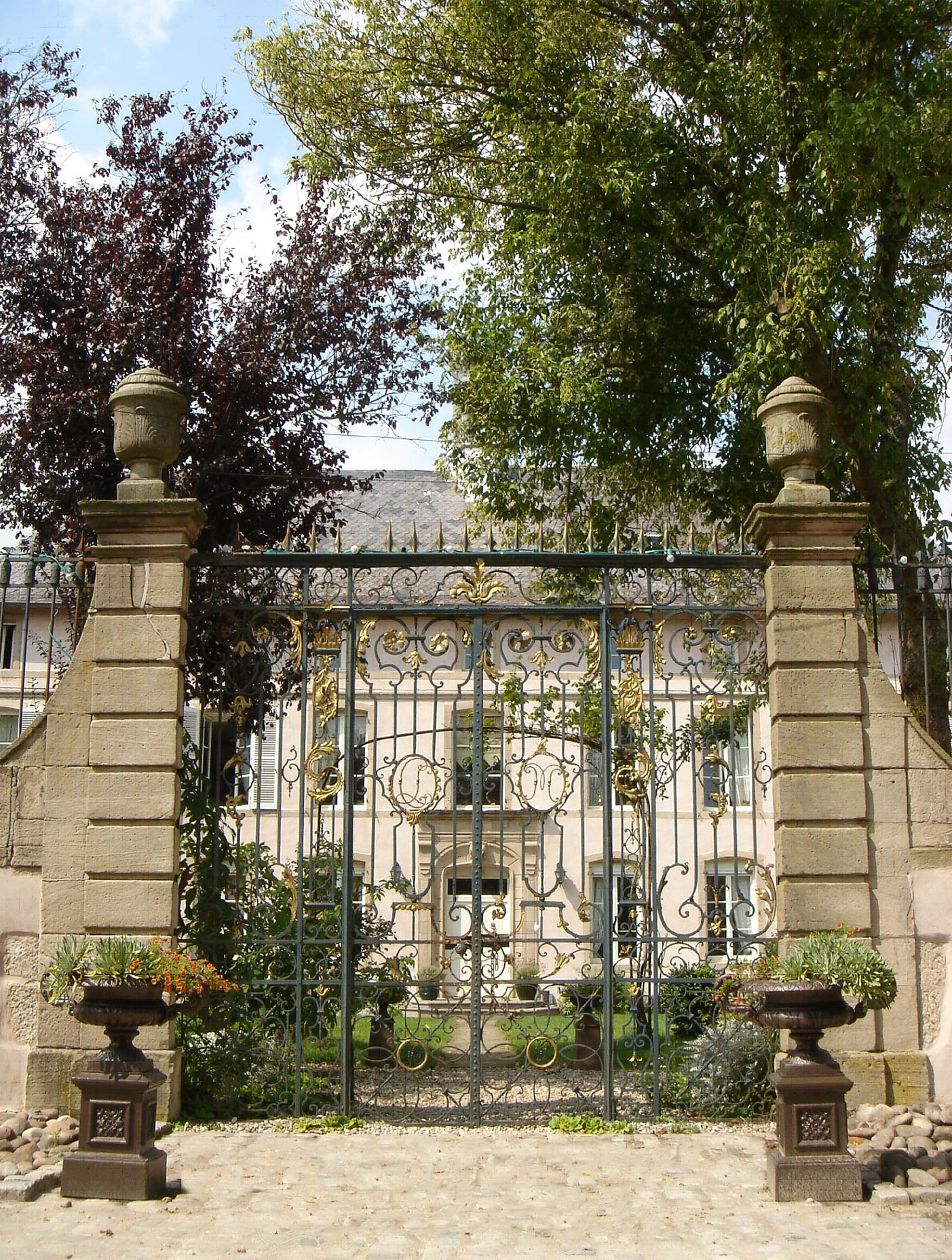
The main frontage and its gilded wrought-iron gates from Jean Lamour

The Château de Failloux (Castle of Failloux) was built in the 18th century in northeastern France. It is located in the commune of Jeuxey in the Vosges département, France, a few kilometers from the historical center of Épinal. The castle takes its name from the local hamlet, Grande Failloux. Etymologically, the term "Failloux" derives from the unusual abundance of deciduous trees in an area generally dominated by coniferous trees. Although falling within the administrative area of the commune of Jeuxey, the site of Failloux is isolated from the village and is located closer to the town of Épinal. The castle entrance has an ornamental wrought-iron gate designed by the workshops of Jean Lamour, who built the gates of the Place Stanislas in Nancy, France.

== Introduction ==
The site of Faillouox is steeped in five centuries of history. The first recorded mention of the site can be traced back to the year 1445. Although historians have been unable to establish an exact date for the construction of the castle, extant documents including a letter from the Duke of Lorraine, Francis III, dated July 3, 1736, and setting it up as fief of Failloux, confirm that a manor house was among the properties of François-Léopold Masson, who thus became the first lord of Failloux.

== Architecture ==
The features of manor house are similar to those common to many 18th-century stately homes and comprises two dovecotes, a bell-tower, outbuildings, and a park.

=== The castle ===
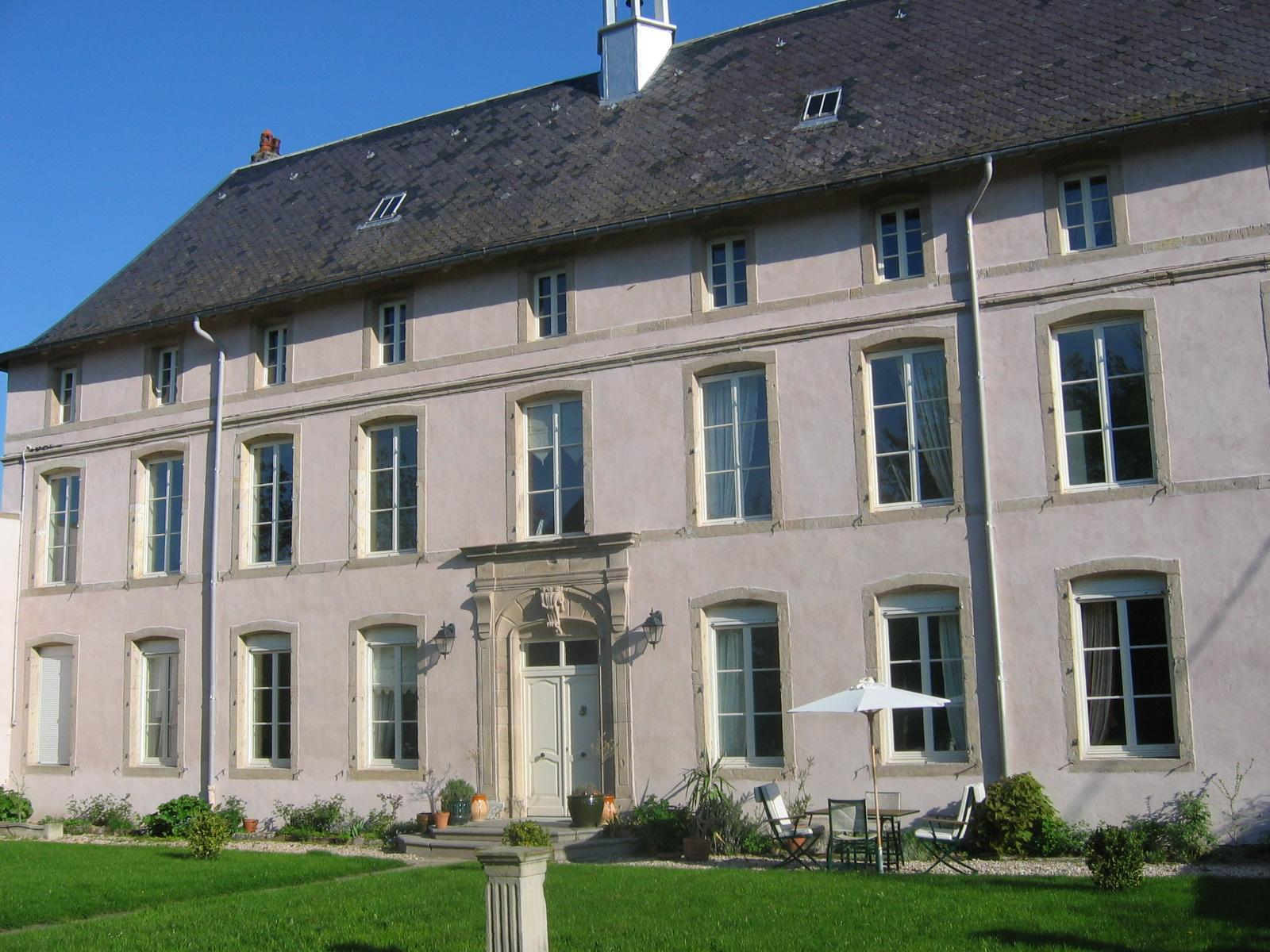
The 26 windows in the mùain facade

The castle is a narrow building, 24 metres (79 ft) long, and only 6.5 metres (21.3 ft) wide, with a height of about 8.5 metres (28 ft), providing three floors and an attic. Three low-vaulted cellars provide the support for the building. At the time of its construction, the house had 21 rooms, one of which was used for indoor tennis. Some time around 1772, the rear part of the castle was widened, and fireplaces (à la royale" (with a large mirror above) added to two reception rooms. In one of the fireplaces, an iron plate on the bottom of the hearth is decorated with a capped blazon of a royal crown and flowers with lily. The main staircase is made of 21 relatively low, wide steps of single blocks. The wrought-iron banister was made by the same workshop that supplied the entrance gates.

=== Courtyard ===
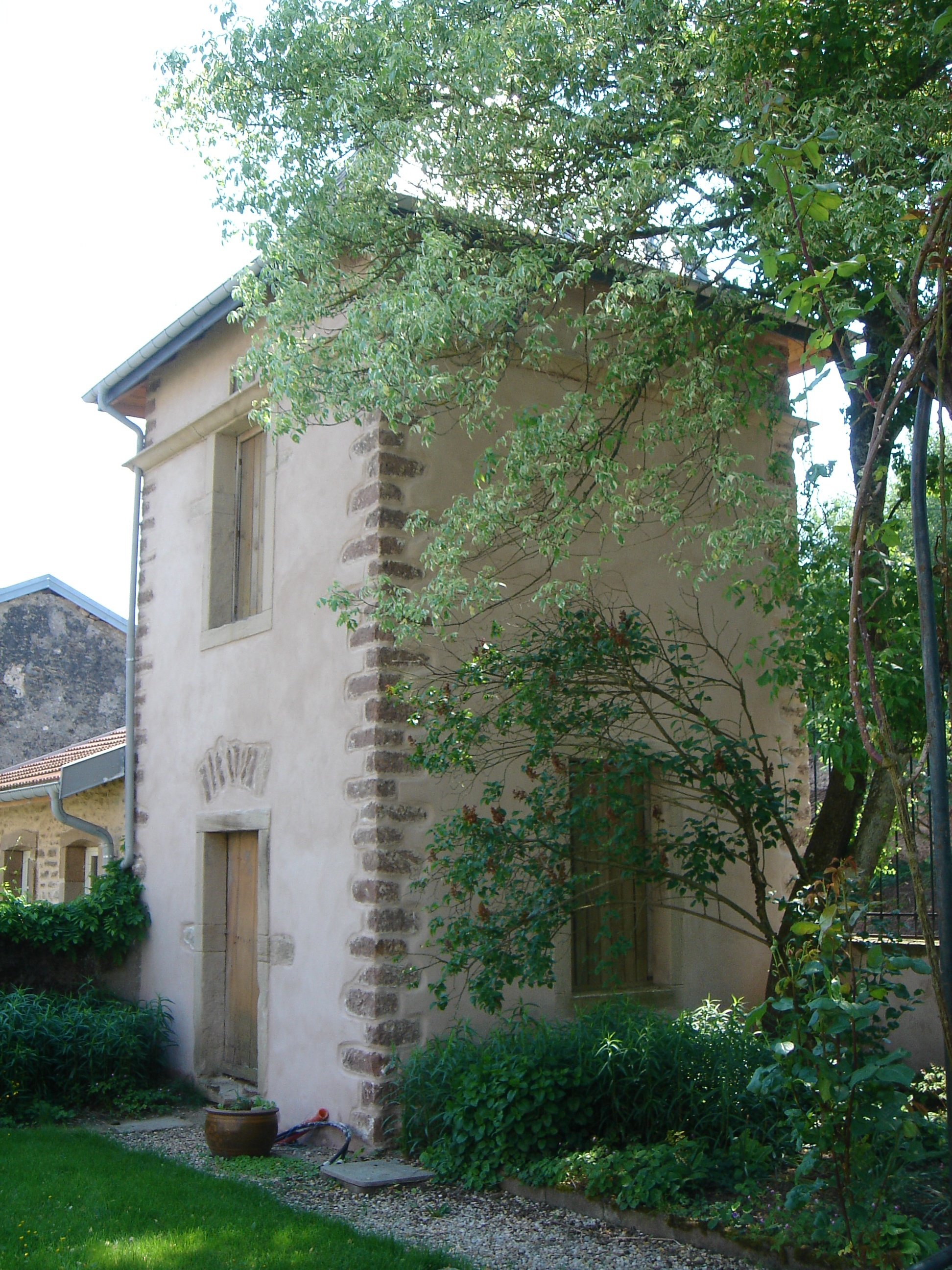
This is one of the two dovecotes that flank the main entrance. One has a baker's oven and a smokehouse for pork.

The courtyard is a 24-by-24-metre (79 ft × 79 ft) square, with two-story houses with slate four-sided hip roofs in the angles. The right-hand house still has a pigeon loft, and the ground floor has a well-preserved fireplace. Between these two houses, a wall supports a succession of surmounted cylindrical bars with spaded points. Two stone pillars, finished by a ballot box, support the grids of the entry. A stone alley leads to the castle. On its line is a fountain with water that comes out a head of a watery god. The whole is overcome by a large urn.

=== The roof ===
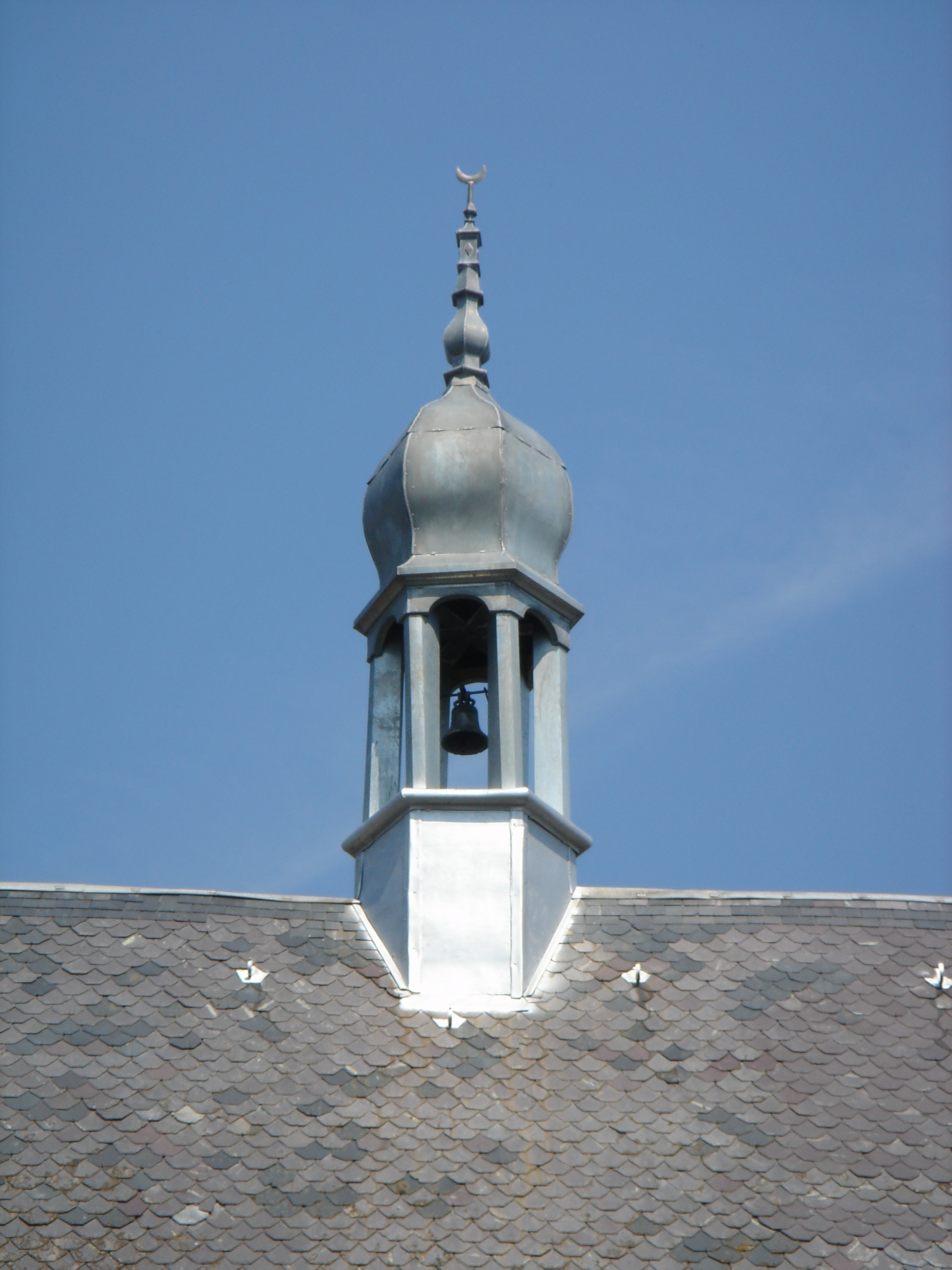
The bell dated from the 17th century and engraved "Jesu Maria" located at the top of the roof

The roof with croups with four sides is covered with slates, and is dominated by a steeple of a bell dating back to 1625, and engraved "Jesus Maria". At the top of this steeple, there is a crescent. It is probable that this symbol is imported from Ottoman culture, which was very popular in the 18th century.

=== The gates ===
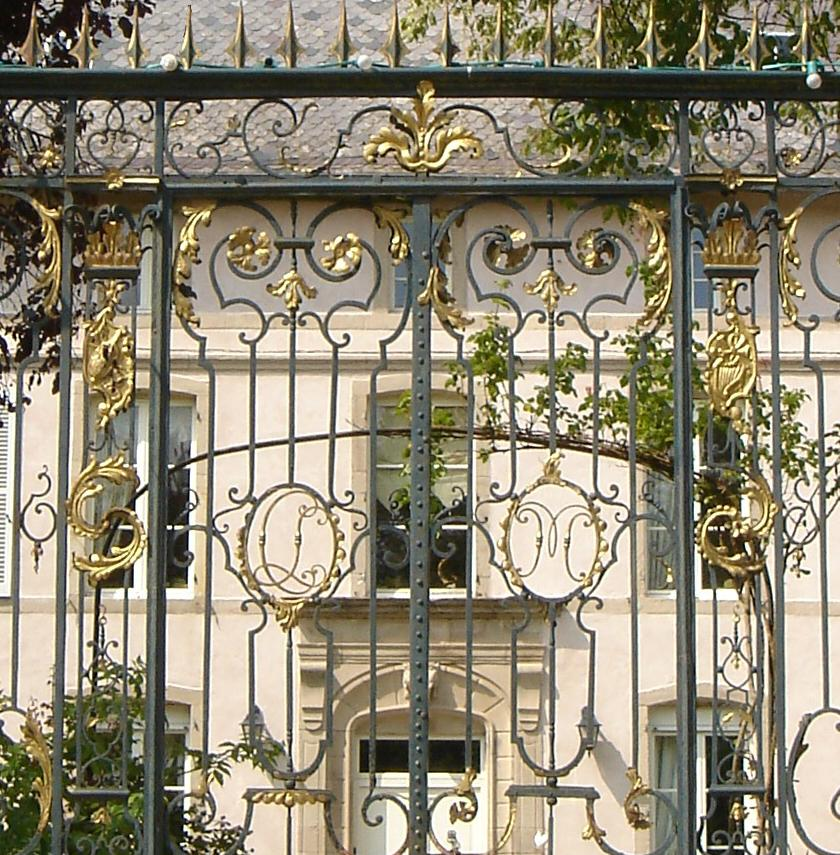
The gilded wrought iron gates of the Castle, realized by the workshops Jean Lamour, 1st half of the 18th century

The gate was created by the famous ironworker Jean Lamour, who also made those that surround Place Stanislas in Nancy. The initials of the first owner appear in the high part of the gate (François-Léopold Masson), and those of the Collinet de la Salle family appear in the low part. It is now enough to examine this gate to imagine the destination of the castle. On each side of the central parts, there is a succession of rubbles, violins, harps, fifres, bagpipes, horns and horns of hunting. The first instruments return to the pleasures of the music, or even the dance, the last seem invited to discipline hunting. By their decoration, the piles that support the gate give a movement of solemn base to the unit. During World War I in 1914, this gate would have been dismounted and hidden in a secure place for fear that the German enemy might steal it.

=== The park ===
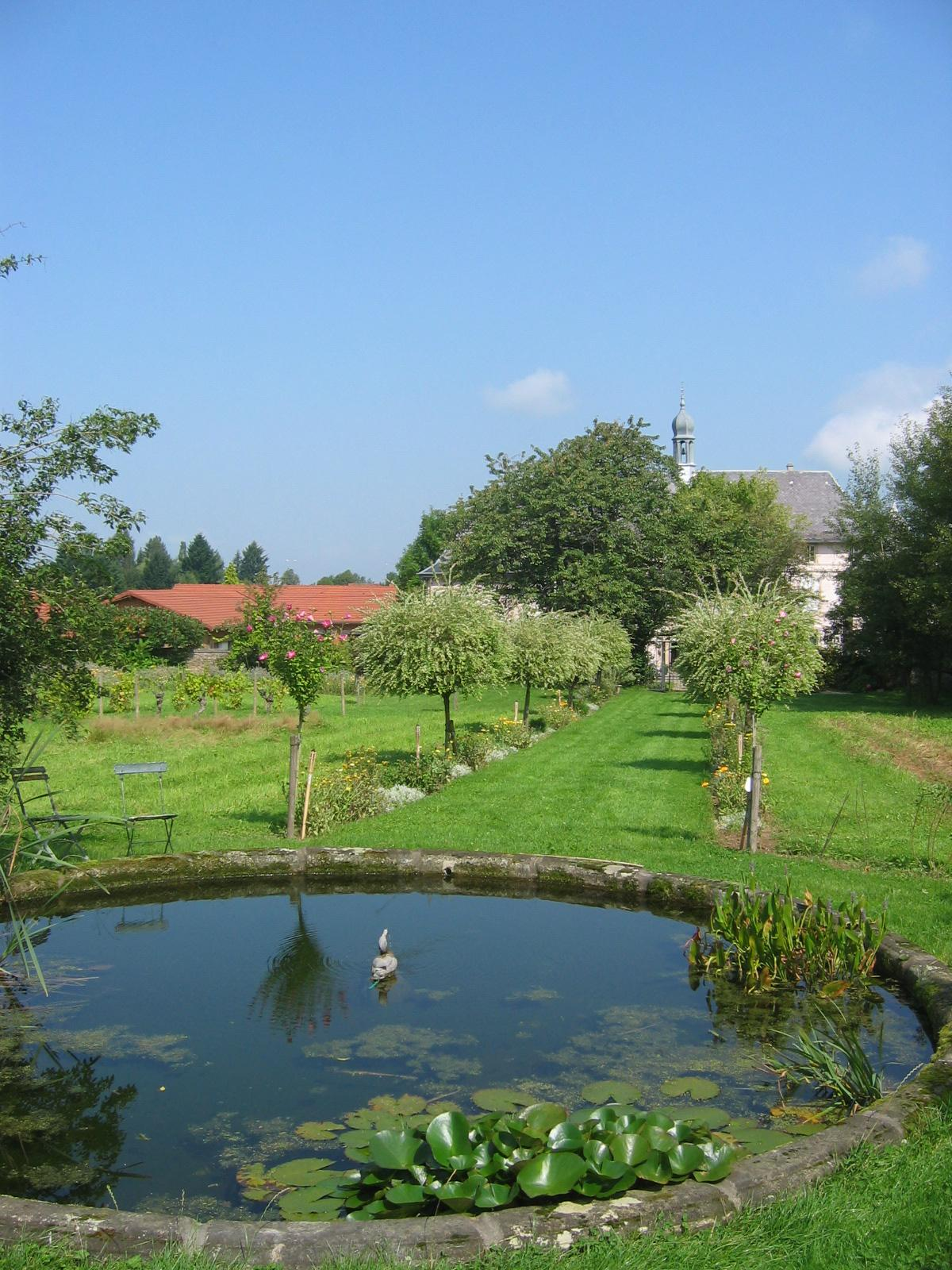
The park of the castle, with the ornamental pond

Located opposite the castle, at the top of a staircase, the park extends on a surface from one hectare. It was used like a pleasure garden. In its center, a stone basin formed the starting point of four alleys (north, south, east, west). It heads a real formal garden. Today, there is a vegetable garden, a few vines, as well as a sheepfold and some animals.

=== The orangery ===
Built on the left side of the castle, the orangery was preceded by a small garden with in its center a water basin and a spray. It contained until 1919, extremely rare exotic plant species of any beauty. After this date, the owner of the time, a retired officer, back from the colonies, converted it into a transitory factory of buttons of mother-of-pearl, used to equip the soldiers of the many barracks of the area. It is not known whether it was built at the same time as the castle.

== Failloux through the ages ==
As mentioned previously, it is almost impossible to give the exact date of the beginning and the end of the building work of the castle. It is known however that it already existed in 1736. Another thing is sure. The farm located on the left side of the castle is older. Two families of owners truly marked the history of the castle of Failloux: the Masson family and the Collinet de la Salle family.

=== Historical context ===
Until 1766, Épinal and its area was French but was not attached to the Duchy of Lorraine. In 1670, the French captured the city of Nancy, and the duke Charles IV took refuge in Épinal. The city, defended by the Count de Tornielle, was attacked by the troops of the marshall of Créqui. This last seized the town of Épinal on September 19 and its castle on September 28. The city was condemned to pay an exorbitant sum of thirty thousand French francs with Barrois and must demolish at its own expense the castle and the fortifications. These conditions, required on order of the king, were intended to frighten Lorraine. The castle was destroyed but the fortifications were destroyed only partially. The amount of money to be paid was much reduced after the rendering of the other Lorraine fortified towns. But the fall of the city represented a turning point: the city ceased being a fortified town. The city was francized gradually. In 1736, the duke Francis III, son of Léopold and his wife the archduchess Maria Theresa, heiress of the House of Habsburg. Alsace was gradually annexed to the kingdom of France during the reign of Louis XIV. Because of that, Lorraine and Barrois became nearly a foreign enclave in its territory. Louis XV refused to see it pass to the hands of a great foreign power: the Empire, its hereditary enemy. By an agreement between Austria and France, François gave up Lorraine to become Grand Duke of Tuscany (an Austrian possession), and France accepted Pragmatic Sanction of the emperor. To spare feelings, the duchies were not immediately annexed in France but given for life to the father-in-law of Louis XV, the former king of Poland, Stanisław Leszczyński, who, since 1737, was the last sovereign duke. The country had been controlled in fact by a French-named chancellor. On the death of Stanislas in 1766, Lorraine and Barrois were reorganized and annexed to France.

=== The construction of the castle ===
François-Léopold Masson, lawyer, adviser and prosecutor of the king in Épinal, enjoyed rights and preferences of exception. In 1736, he was ennobled and built the castle. He thus became the first owner and became the first lord of Failloux. On August 13, 1761, François-Léopold Masson, lord of Failloux, accommodates Ladies of France, Adelaïde and Victoire, daughters of Louis XV, at the time of their passage to Épinal, on the road of very in-vogue terms of Plombières-les-Bains.

=== The Collinet de la Salle family ===
Two years after the death of F. L. Masson, on 21 July 1767, for problems of succession and because of the too great number of heirs, the estate was put on sale. In 1768, François Loyal, receiver of the sums of money of the town of Épinal, and his wife, bought the fief of Failloux, which they resold four years later. On April 7, 1772, Charles-François-Xavier Collinet de la Salle, rider, lord of Fremifontaine and Bouzillon and his wife, Anne-Marie Magdelaine Maurice de Sarisming, each bought one-half of the stronghold of Failloux. He then became Seigneur of Frémifontaine and Failloux. During the Revolution, the Collinet family of the Room would suffer. It would have been necessary to justify non-emigration of his wife (left in cure to Switzerland) and of her son so that the fief remains in the hands of Charles-François-Xavier. One of his cousins, Pierre-Maurice Collinet de la Salle, did not have as much chance, and was placed in front of Revolutionary Tribunal, condemned and executed in Paris, the same day as Charlotte Corday. With the death of Charles-François-Xavier Collinet de la Salle, which occurred in his castle on November 21, 1813, his three children inherited the Failloux and others. Following family arrangements, only their son Charles-Marie remained at it, the single owner until his death. When on June 1, 1863, he died, unmarried, at 89 years of age, it is the end of the fief of Failloux. It from then on was parcelled out in three parts: the castle, the farm of Grande Failloux, and that of Petite Failloux.

=== The Franco-Prussian War in Failloux ===
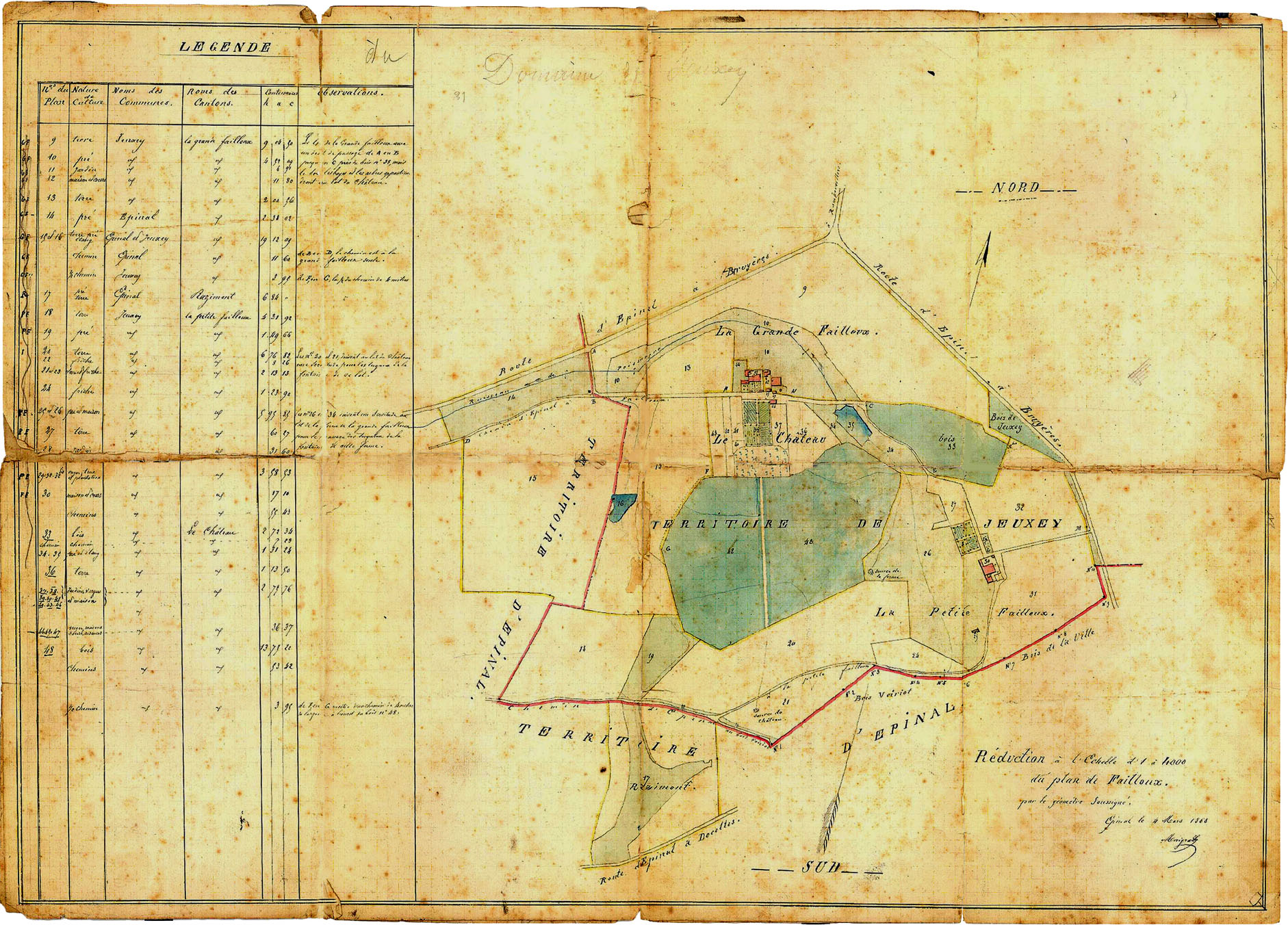
Map of the site of Failloux on a scale 1 to 4000, dated March 4, 1868

The castle of Failloux occupies a "strategic" site with the accesses of the Epinal-native agglomeration. It makes it possible, indeed, to supervise the roads, which, coming from Rambervillers, give access, by Poissompré, to the suburbs of the Michaelmas and Ambrail, in the center of the city. In 1870, after the defeats at the borders and with Sedan, 250 national guards went to Épinal for "to defend the castle of Failloux". It is there, which on October 12, 1870, held the ultimate combat that delivered to the Prussian armies, the defenders of Épinal. It arises from the testimonies transcribed in "The army of the East" that:

The battalion of the national guard of Épinal, was composed of 7 companies of a total staff complement of approximately 1500 men. [...] The 6th company, without chiefs, sprang beyond the line of defence, and was thrown in the property of Failloux dominated on all sides by the enemy who was in wood neighbors. These some national guards are transferred soon attacked by a German cloud. [...] These Epinal-native troops did not cease facing the enemy whom they defied at very short distance (often with 100 meters), all disseminated behind the wood clusters, in the farm of Failloux. A long time, they were defended, but finally had to move back in front of the number and were partly disarmed and captive. There, especially, the national guard had to regret of the victims, six men died and eight wounded and 12 other prisoners.

The combat lasted four hours, leaving the prefect time to transfer his administration, the material of the railroad, the case of general treasury of a value of 4 million, and 400 wounded in a military hospital. Following this war, the castle remained French, as well as the department of the Vosges, which would never form part of Alsace-Lorraine.

=== Failloux in the 20th century ===
With the death of Charles-François-Xavier Collinet de la Salle in 1863, the estate of Failloux became nothing more but one simple place of dwellings and farms. The owners would follow one another in a number until the year 1960. One of them cut down an alley of oaks centenaries connecting the castle to the way of Failloux, located on the other side of the current expressway (RN 57). It also benefited from the withdrawal of the exotic plants located in the orangery, to make a factory of mother-of-pearl buttons of it. Surprisingly, less is known of the use of the castle at the 20th century than before. Some say it would have been used as an appendix with the prefecture of the Vosges during the world wars, others that it would have been a hospital. Until the beginning of 2000, the castle was largely ignored by local inhabitants, though many motor tourists had observed it each day.

== Today ==
Entirely renovated at the beginning of the 2000s, it is now a six-room bed and breakfast.
