= Dignonville =

- Commune
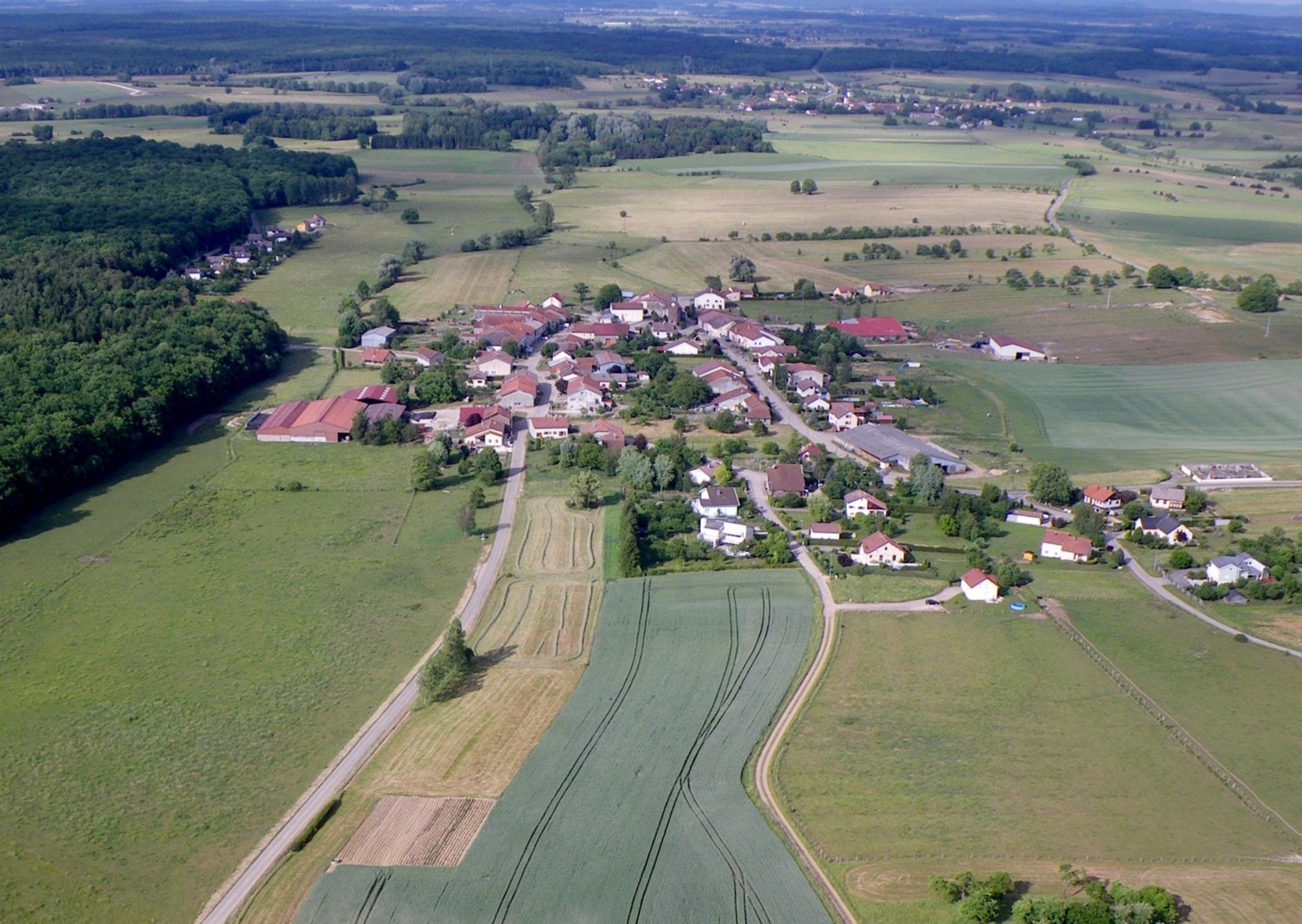
- A general view of Dignonville

- Coat of arms
- Location of Dignonville
- Location within France Location within Grand Est
- Coordinates: 48°14′39″N 6°30′23″E
- Country: France
- Region: Grand Est
- Department: Vosges
- Arrondissement: Épinal
- Canton: Épinal-2
- Intercommunality: CA Épinal

Government
  - Mayor (2020–2026): Daniel Micard
- Area^{1}: 5.93 km^{2} (2.29 sq mi)
- Elevation: 345 m (1,132 ft)
- Highest elevation: 400 m (1,300 ft)
- Lowest elevation: 322 m (1,056 ft)
- Population (2023): 208
  - Density: 35.1/km^{2} (90.8/sq mi)
- Time zone: UTC+01:00 (CET)
  - Summer (DST): UTC+02:00 (CEST)
- INSEE/Postal code: 88133 /88000
- ^{1} French Land Register data, which excludes lakes, ponds, glaciers > 1 km^{2} (0.386 sq mi or 247 acres) and river estuaries.

Dignonville (French pronunciation: [diɲɔ̃vil]) is a commune in the Vosges department in Grand Est in northeastern France.

== See also ==
- Communes of the Vosges department
