= Dirty Circus =

Canadian hip hop group

- Origin: Vancouver, British Columbia, Canada
- Genres: Canadian hip hop
- Years active: 2000–present
- Label: Urbnet Records
- Members: Metty the Dert Merchant; Mos Eisley; DJ Itchy Ron

Dirty Circus is a Canadian hip hop group, initially consisting of Metty the DertMerchant, Mos Eisley, and DJ Itchy Ron of the music collective Sweatshop Union.

== History ==
Metty, Eisley, and DJ Itchy Ron began performing on the local hip hop scene in their hometown of Vancouver in 2000. They collaborated with Pigeon Hole (then known as "Creative Minds"), among others, to self-publish their first album Wildlife Canada. In 2005, they released their second album Over Easy, featuring more local hip-hop artists. A year later they would also end up re-issuing their Over Easy album as Over Easy V.2.

They later formed Sweatshop Union with Pigeon Hole and other local Vancouver hip-hop artists that they had collaborated with in the past.

Dirty Circus released their first album as a duo (without DJ Itchy Ron), Alive and Well, in 2010 on URBNET Records. As well as the two main rappers, the album features a number of guest musicians. The album's lead single, "Into the Sun", features contributions from Geo of Blue Scholars and Shad. Others on the album include Bootie Brown, Chin Injeti, Rhettmatic, and Rob the Viking.

Alive and Well appeared on the EarShot campus and community radio hip hop chart in July and August that year. It was one of three albums released on the same day by side projects of Sweatshop Union, alongside Pigeon Hole's Age Like Astronauts and Trillionaire$' By Hook or by Crook.

== Discography ==
- Wildlife Canada (2000)
- Over Easy (2005)
- Over Easy V.2 (2006)
- Alive and Well (2010)
