= Get Some Friends =

Studio album by Ghettosocks
- Released: November 15, 2006
- Recorded: 2005–2006
- Genre: Hip hop
- Length: 37:31
- Labels: Alpha Flight; Droppin' Science
- Producers: Ghettosocks; Mr. Bix

Ghettosocks chronology
Battle Royale (with Alpha Flight) (2005)	Get Some Friends (2006)	I Can Make Your Dog Famous (with DJ Jorun Bombay) (2008)

Get Some Friends is a solo album by Canadian rapper and producer Ghettosocks, released on November 15, 2006 by Alpha Flight and Droppin' Science.

The album debuted at number 1 on Chart Attack and !earshot hip-hop charts in 2007. It ranked number 1 on !earshot's 2007 year-end hip-hop chart.

== Critical reception ==
Professional ratings
Review scores
Source	Rating
RapReviews	5.5/10

Thomas Quinlan of Exclaim! wrote that Ghettosocks "hits a variety of production styles and he knits them all together with great attention to atmospheric sounds and little details within the beats."

Trevor Savory of The Coast called the album "pure ear candy, throwing the calendar back to the days of hip-hop’s infancy, when word of mouth was more important than the hype or history of beef that the genre finds itself mired in today."

== Track listing ==
No.	Title	Producer(s)	Length
1.	"Socks Is Okay"	Ghettosocks	1:48
2.	"Lapping the Sun"	Ghettosocks	2:23
3.	"Suck It Up"	Ghettosocks	3:05
4.	"A Song About Breakdancing"	Ghettosocks	2:50
5.	"Step to a T-Rex" (featuring DJ Josh)	Ghettosocks	3:09
6.	"Count Sockula Esquire"	Ghettosocks	3:30
7.	"Naturally Nice"	Ghettosocks	3:16
8.	"City Life" (featuring Classified & Loe Pesci)	Mr. Bix	3:56
9.	"Read-A-Book"	Ghettosocks	2:47
10.	"Steal from Walmart"	Ghettosocks	2:56
11.	"I Invented Everything" (featuring Jabba tha Cutt)	Ghettosocks	2:59
12.	"Out to You" (featuring Apt & DJ Josh)	Ghettosocks	3:24
13.	"Comfortable Silence"		1:23
