= The Book (D-Sisive EP) =

EP by D-Sisive
- Released: May 27, 2008
- Genre: Hip hop
- Length: 23:20
- Label: Urbnet Records

D-Sisive chronology
The Book (2008)	Let the Children Die (2009)

Professional ratings
Review scores
Source	Rating
RapReviews	9/10 stars

The Book is a 2008 EP by Canadian rapper D-Sisive. The release was nominated for "Rap Recording of the Year" at the 2009 Juno Awards.

== Track listing ==
1. Intro (The Story of an Artist)
2. Brian Wilson
3. Ambulance (featuring Tom Waits)
4. ThisIsWhatItSoundsLikeWhenWhiteboysListenToHipHop
5. Up
6. Kneecaps
7. Laundry Room
8. Lights Out
