= Sweatshop Union =

Canadian hip hop collective

- Origin: Vancouver, British Columbia, Canada
- Genres: Canadian hip hop
- Years active: 2000–present
- Labels: Battle Axe Records; Urbnet Records
- Members: Dusty Melo; Marmalade; Steve Hawking (aka Conscience/Treefrog); Metty the Dert Merchant; DJ Itchy Ron; Mos Eisley; Ray Black
- Past members: Kyprios
- Website: sweatshopunion.com

Sweatshop Union is a Canadian hip hop collective based in Vancouver, British Columbia, consisting of four politically-minded rap groups — Dirty Circus, Pigeon Hole (aka "Creative Minds"), Innocent Bystanders and The Trillionaires, as well as rapper Kyprios. Known for their socially conscious lyrics, Sweatshop Union's music comments on issues ranging from the war in Iraq, the plight of the poor and working-class, to the negativity and misogyny of mainstream hip-hop.

== History ==
In 2000, the members of Dirty Circus, Pigeon Hole, Innocent Bystanders and Kyprios came together to produce an album. The result, titled Wildlife Canada, was released in 2000.

In 2001, they collaborated again, this time forming Sweatshop Union as their group name where they produced and then independently published their first album local.604 in 2002 through Metty the Dert Merchant's company "Dert Merchant Undertakings". The title of the album refers to the fact that they represent the local district members of a "Sweatshop Union" (Trade Union), using the number "604" which is an area code in their hometown of Vancouver, British Columbia.

The group signed with Battle Axe Records in 2002 and re-released local.604 after re-recording some of the tracks, removing a track, and adding some additional ones. The group also began touring North America with a number of other rap and hip-hop artists, including their label-mates Swollen Members.

Their 2003 album Natural Progression led to a Juno Award nomination and three Western Canadian Music Award nominations. They have been called part of "Vancouver's hip-hop renaissance", and had their music featured in CBC Radio's Make Some Noise documentary. They have expanded their touring to the east coast, hoping to increase awareness about their music.

The band's fourth studio album, Water Street, was released in 2008. In early 2009, Sweatshop Union's "Oh My" won in the 8th Annual Independent Music Awards for Best Rap/Hip-Hop Song.

This was followed by three albums in 2010, each by one of Sweatshop Union's sub-groups: Dirty Circus, Pigeon Hole, and The Trillionaires with rapper Evil Ebenezer.

Sweatshop's The Bill Murray EP, was released on March 1, 2011 on Urbnet Records. It features eight songs, and production from Pigeon Hole, Rob the Viking, Dave Knill and Preme Diesel and won the 2011 Western Canadian Music Awards' Hip Hop Album of the Year. This was the first album in which former group member Kyprios did not appear.

As of 2011, Kyprios left the group to pursue his solo career. Sweatshop released The Leisure Gang EP on July 3, 2012 as a free download.

On May 28, 2013 they released their fifth LP titled Infinite, which featured artists Mos Eisley, Marmalade, Ray Black, Metty the Dert Merchant, Dusty Melo, Conscience (Tree Frog) and Dave Knill, with guest verses from Snak the Ripper, Def 3, and Claire Mortifee.

Founding groups that comprise Sweatshop Union
Group	Members
Innocent Bystanders	Mos Eisley; Steve Hawking (aka Conscience/Treefrog)
Pigeon Hole (aka Creative Minds)	Marmalade; Dusty Melo
Dirty Circus	Mos Eisley; Metty the Dert Merchant; DJ Itchy Ron
The Trillionaires	Metty the Dert Merchant Evil Ebenezer (non-member)
N/A (Solo Artist)	Kyprios

== Discography ==
- local.604 (2002)
- Natural Progression (2003)
- United We Fall (2005)
- Water Street (2008)
- The Bill Murray EP (2011)
- The Leisure Gang EP (2012)
- Infinite (2013)
