= Jeuxey =

- Commune
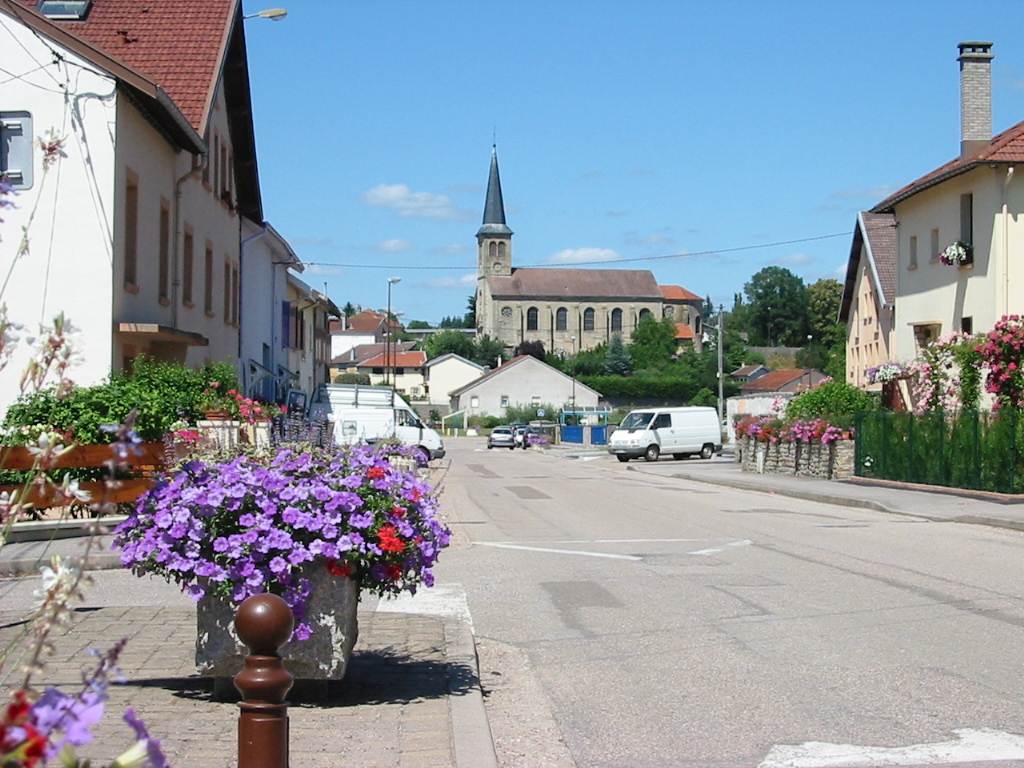
- The church and surroundings in Jeuxey

- Coat of arms
- Location of Jeuxey
- Location within France Location within Grand Est
- Coordinates: 48°12′09″N 6°29′19″E
- Country: France
- Region: Grand Est
- Department: Vosges
- Arrondissement: Épinal
- Canton: Épinal-2
- Intercommunality: CA Épinal

Government
  - Mayor (2020–2026): Oreste Timoteo
- Area^{1}: 8.49 km^{2} (3.28 sq mi)
- Elevation: 330 m (1,080 ft)
- Highest elevation: 420 m (1,380 ft)
- Lowest elevation: 315 m (1,033 ft)
- Population (2023): 663
  - Density: 78.1/km^{2} (202/sq mi)
- Time zone: UTC+01:00 (CET)
  - Summer (DST): UTC+02:00 (CEST)
- INSEE/Postal code: 88253 /88000
- ^{1} French Land Register data, which excludes lakes, ponds, glaciers > 1 km^{2} (0.386 sq mi or 247 acres) and river estuaries.

Jeuxey (French pronunciation: [ʒøsɛ]) is a commune in the Vosges department in Grand Est in northeastern France.

== See also ==
- Château de Failloux
- Communes of the Vosges department
