= Muneshine =

Canadian musician and producer

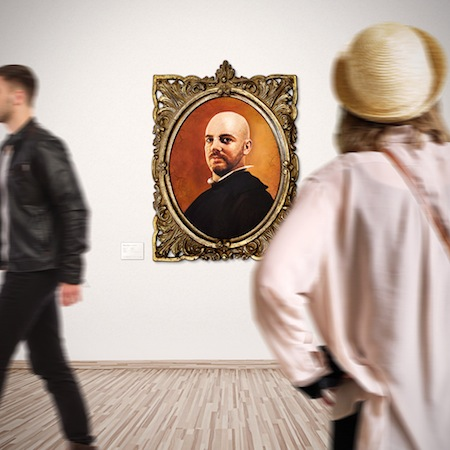
- Muneshine on In Transit album

Background information
- Born: Rob Bakker; Saskatoon, Saskatchewan, Canada
- Origin: Toronto, Ontario, Canada
- Genres: Hip-hop; Canadian hip-hop alternative hip-hop electronic
- Occupations: Rapper; record producer; DJ; mixing engineer
- Years active: 2001–present
- Labels: Scissor; Tommy Boy; Droppin' Science; Handcuts; Mumbles; Grindin; Blunted Astronaut
- Website: muneshine.com

Rob Bakker, better known by his stage name Muneshine, is a Canadian rapper, record producer, DJ and mixing engineer. Since 2005, Muneshine has released three major label projects in Japan, and contributed production and vocal appearances on more. His sales in this territory exceed 40,000 units His first release (Phocus – A Vision and a Plan) debuted on HMV Japan's hip hop charts at No. 8. Since then, Muneshine has collaborated with a number of popular American hip hop musicians, including Pete Rock, Sean Price, DJ Spinna, Buckwild, Guilty Simpson, Nature, and Rob Swift.

== Musical career ==
=== 2001–2009: Lightheaded, Phocus, and the Residents ===
Starting out in music, Muneshine primarily produced and mixed. In 2000, he connected online with artists Braille, Ohmega Watts and Othello to form the group Lightheaded. They released their debut album 'Pure Thoughts' in 2001 to critical acclaim and mild commercial success in Japan. The following year, Muneshine connected with Emilio Rojas (at the time using the alias Sycorax 1, and later Raks One). The two formed a duo named Phocus and created and released their only album, 'A Vision and a Plan'. Following these releases (and growing success in Japan), Muneshine created his first solo album, 'Opportunity Knocks' which was released in 2005 on Handcuts Records. On this album he collaborated with legendary hip hop producers Pete Rock and DJ Spinna, further expanding his reach in the underground hip hop world. In 2007, Muneshine created 3 versions of his album 'Status Symbol' (each released in a different territory – Australia, Japan and North America). This same year he also released his first instrumental hip hop album, 'A Walk In The Park'. In 2008 Muneshine partnered with New York based producer/MC Saint, forming their duo The Residents. After releasing a promotional remix album flipping Jay Z's 'American Gangster' with all original production they created and released their only album, 'Open House'.

=== 2009–2012: Collaborations with D-Sisive ===
In this stage of his career, Muneshine often collaborated with fellow Canadian MC D-Sisive. The duo won SOCAN's coveted Echo Songwriting award for the song "Nobody with a Notepad" taken from D-Sisive's album Let the Children Die. The song caught the attention of notable hip hop artists such as DJ Premier and DJ Eclipse. Since then, they have released the albums Vaudeville, Jonestown, Jonestown 2, and Jonestown 3.

=== 2011–2014: Twin Peaks, Wolves, and further solo efforts ===
In 2010 Muneshine started working closely with fellow Canadian MC/producer, Ghettosocks. The two began writing music and eventually touring internationally in support of their collaborative project, Twin Peaks. In 2010 they created their album 'Kissing Hands & Shaking Babies' which was released on Droppin' Science Productions. The duo toured extensively in Canada, the United Kingdom (with The Herbaliser), Sweden, Germany and Poland. In 2011 the album was released and was nominated for an East Coast Music Award (Best Hip Hop Album). Once that project had concluded, Muneshine and Ghettosocks brought in three more artists they worked closely with – D-Sisive, Timbuktu and Bix in an effort to form a larger group project, Wolves. In 2013 they released their self-titled album.

In 2012, Muneshine released a solo project There Is Only Today, his first under the Droppin' Science label. The album featured production from DJ Spinna, Buckwild, !llmind and M-Phazes, among others. Guest appearances include Emilio Rojas, D-Sisive and Ghettosocks, among others.

2013 saw the release of Muneshine's limited edition 12" EP, Bed Bugs via Blunted Astronaut Records (UK). This release featured remixes from producers Herbaliser and Soundsci, as well as a vocal feature from Canadian hip hop artist Moka Only.

On 30 June 2014, Muneshine released his fifth solo album, In Transit, on Toronto label Scissor Records & Tommy Boy Entertainment (NYC). This whole album was written "In Transit", meaning on a plane, train, bus, car, walking and biking. It featured production from Exile, Oddisee and DJ Spinna, among others. The same year, Muneshine premiered the single "Venus & Mars" (Freddie Joachim Remix) on Majestic Casual, gaining 800,000-plus plays on YouTube and 600,000-plus on Soundcloud. On the production side, Muneshine's Portugal. The Man and Spandau Ballet flip also recently went official with over 900,000 plays.

=== 2014–present: Transition to electronic music ===
Since then, Muneshine has been focused on producing and writing electronic music. He released 'Sunshine' his first effort in this lane in 2015 with Haven Sounds. The single was released with 2 remixes, one from Germany based house producer LCAW, the other from legendary New York producer, DJ Spinna. In 2017 Muneshine has released his latest EP, 'Full Throttle' featuring Toronto rock/pop duo Darcys. This song was also released with 2 remixes, one from UK-based duo Du Tonc, the other from German producer PWNDTIAC.

== Juno Nominations ==
Four projects Muneshine has collaborated on with D-Sisive have been nominated for Juno Awards. In 2008, D-Sisive's B.O.O.K., which was engineered by Muneshine, was nominated for Rap Album of the Year. D-Sisive's 2010 release Vaudeville (engineered by Fresh Kils and featuring rap vocals by Muneshine) was nominated under the same category, and Jonestown 2, D-Sisive's 2011 release received the same Juno nod and was produced and engineered by Muneshine. This year, D-Sisive's video for "Friend of Mine," (prod. Muneshine) was nominated for Video of the Year. Muneshine's production on D-Sisive's "Nobody with a Notepad," was also chosen in The Huffington Post's "100 Best Canadian Songs Ever" in 2014.

== Discography ==
Studio albums

- Opportunity Knocks (2005)
- A Walk in the Park (2007)
- Status Symbol (2008)
- There Is Only Today (2012)
- In Transit (2014)
- Sunshine (2015)
- Full Throttle (2017)

Collaborative albums

- A Vision and a Plan [EP] (2004) (with Raks One, as Phocus)
- A Vision and a Plan (2004) (Phocus)
- Open House (2010) (with Saint, as The Residents)
- The Perfect Strangers EP (2010) (with Ghettosocks, as Twin Peaks)
- Kissing Hands & Shaking Babies (2011) (Twin Peaks)
- Mount Crushmore EP (2012) (Twin Peaks & The Returners)
- Wolves (2013) (with Bix, D-Sisive, Ghettosocks & Timbuktu, as Wolves)

Compilations

- Home Brewed Productions (2010)
- Train of Thought (2011) (with Ghettosocks & Timbuktu)

Singles

- "Overdrive" (12") (2005)
- "Imagine That" (12") (2006)
- "Mark My Words" (12") (2007)
- "Kaboom!!!" (12") (2007) (Twin Peaks)
- "Bed Bugs" (12") (2013)
- "Sunshine" (12") (2017)

Remixes

- Miguel Ft. Kendrick Lamar – How Many Drinks (Muneshine Remix)
- Portugal. The Man – Purple Yellow Red Blue (Muneshine Remix)
- Thrillers – Can't Get Enough (Muneshine Remix)
- Muneshine Ft. Grimm – Sunshine (LCAW Remix)

Awards & Nominations

- 2014 Juno Nomination – Video of the Year: D-Sisive – "Friend Of Mine" (Produced by Muneshine)
- 2011 Juno Nomination – Rap Album Of The Year: D-Sisive – Jonestown 2 (Produced and Engineered by Muneshine)
- 2010 Juno Nomination – Rap Album Of The Year: D-Sisive – Vaudeville (Engineered by Fresh Kils, featuring Muneshine)
- 2008 Juno Nomination – Rap Album Of The Year: D-Sisive – B.O.O.K. (Engineered by Muneshine)
- 2011 East Coast Music Awards – Hip Hop Album Of The Year: Twin Peaks – Kissing Hands & Shaking Babies (Written, produced, engineered by Muneshine)
- 2009 Polaris Music Prize – Long List: D-Sisive – Let The Children Die (Produced and Engineered by Muneshine)
- 2012 Polaris Music Prize – Long List: D-Sisive – Jonestown 2 (Produced and Engineered by Muneshine)

Guest appearances

- Factor Chandelier – "Walk Don't Run" from Con-Soul Confessions (2003)
- D-Sisive – "I See" from Let the Children Die (2009)
- Ghettosocks – "U Ain't This" from Treat of the Day (2009)

== See also ==
- Canadian hip hop
