= Local 604 =

local.604 (re-issue)

Studio album by Sweatshop Union
- Released: 2002
- Recorded: 2002
- Studio: Gotham City Studios
- Genre: Hip hop
- Length: 73:09
- Label: Underworld Inc.
- Producers: Metty the Dert Merchant; Mos Eisley; Rob the Viking

Sweatshop Union chronology
local.604 (independent) (2002)	local.604 (re-issue) (2002)	Natural Progression (2003)

Professional ratings
Review scores
Source	Rating
AllMusic	3/5 stars
HipHopInfinity	4.16/5 stars

local.604 is a 2002 album by Canadian hip hop group Sweatshop Union, released by Underworld Inc. It is a re-issue of the groups first independent release with some changes.

The track titled "Audio Cassette Therapy" was cut from the album. Two tracks, "The Human's Race" and "President's Choice", were added in this re-issue. Many tracks were re-recorded, including different vocal takes, and changes in instruments.

== Track listing ==
All tracks were written by Sweatshop Union, except where noted.

1. "Nothing Makes Sense" (DertMerchant) – 2:32
2. "Union Dues" – 3:09
3. "Feelin' Alright" (Kyprios) – 3:15
4. "The Humans' Race" – 4:14
5. "President's Choice" (Creative Minds) – 3:32
6. "Don't Mind Us" (Innocent Bystanders) – 3:34
7. "Blue Collar Ballad" (Dirty Circus) – 3:50
8. "All I Know" (Kyprios) – 3:33
9. "Dirty Work" – 5:31
10. "The Truth We Speak" (Dirty Circus) – 3:22
11. "Little Things" (Creative Minds) – 3:51
12. "Prose and Cons" (Dirty Circus featuring Bookworm and J-StaRRRrrr!!!) – 4:09
13. "A Wrinkle in Time" (Innocent Bystanders) – 2:53
14. "Breath" (Creative Minds) – 2:35
15. "Labour Pains" – 4:16
16. "The Revolution" (Kyprios) – 5:04
17. "Ascend" (Innocent Bystanders) – 4:42
18. "Outro" – 9:07
