= United We Fall (album) =

Studio album by Sweatshop Union
- Released: 2005
- Recorded: 2004
- Genre: Hip hop
- Length: 47:18
- Label: Battle Axe Records
- Producers: Rob the Viking, Sweatshop Union

Sweatshop Union chronology
| Natural Progression (2004) | United We Fall (2005) | Water Street (2008) |

Professional ratings
Review scores
| Source | Rating |
|---|---|
| Now | 4/5 stars |
| RapReviews | 7/10 stars |

United We Fall is a 2005 album by Canadian hip hop group Sweatshop Union, released by Battle Axe Records.

== Track listing ==
1. "Square One" – 1:51
2. "Cut Back (Since June)" – 3:11
3. "Broken Record" – 3:40
4. "Close to Home" – 4:53
5. "Never Enough (Money Love Me)" – 4:04
6. "Office Space" – 3:23
7. "FWUH" – 1:18
8. "Cheese Cuttin'" – 2:43
9. "Come Back" – 2:44
10. "Try" – 3:18
11. "God Bless" – 2:21
12. "Hit the Wall" – 4:00
13. "I've Been Down" – 4:02
14. "Lead the Way" – 3:13
15. "The End of It All" – 2:38

== Reception ==
United We Fall by Sweatshop Union was nominated for a 2006 Juno Award in the category Rap Recording of the Year.
