= Dogneville =

- Commune
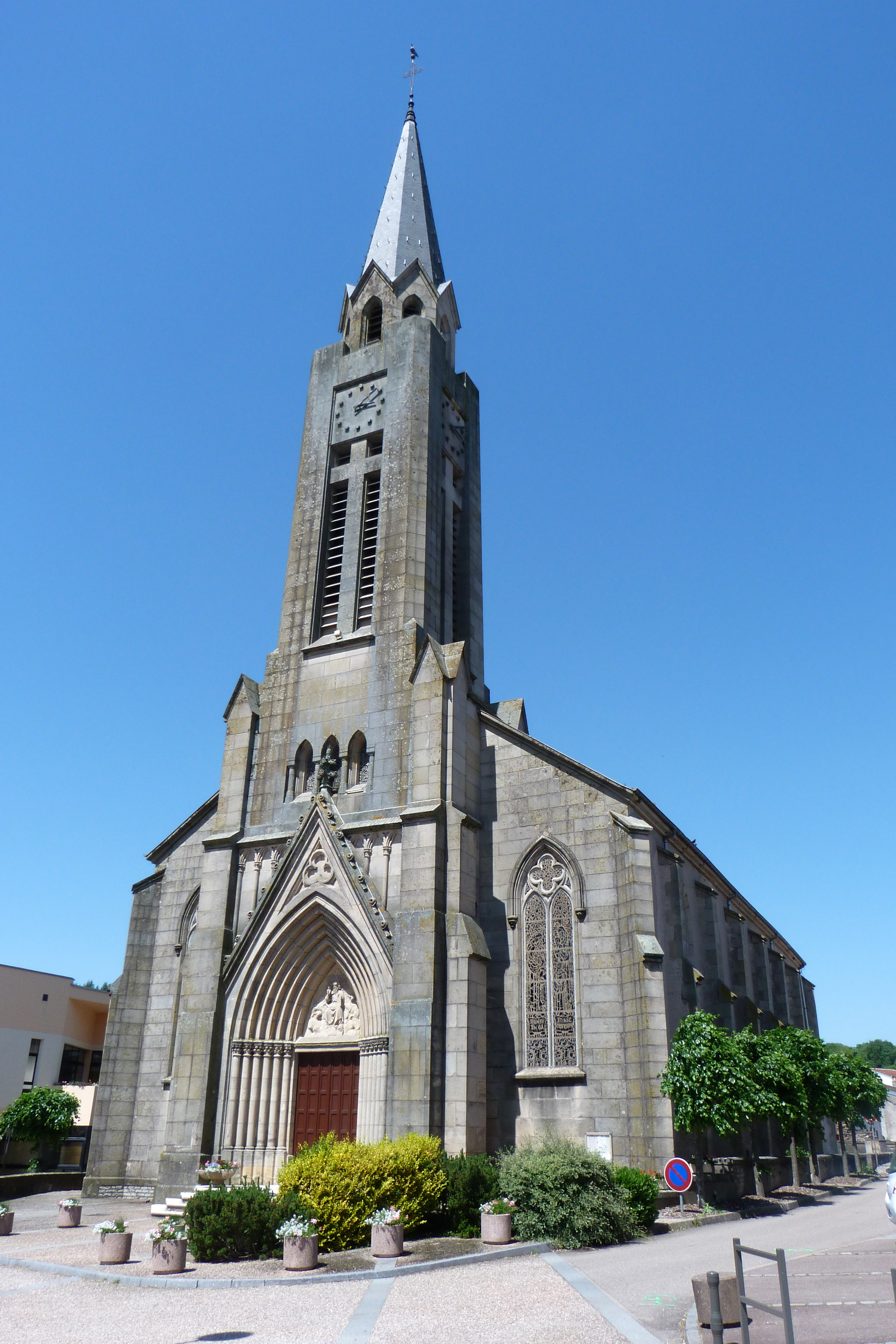
- The church in Dogneville

- Coat of arms
- Location of Dogneville
- Location within France Location within Grand Est
- Coordinates: 48°13′27″N 6°27′29″E
- Country: France
- Region: Grand Est
- Department: Vosges
- Arrondissement: Épinal
- Canton: Épinal-2
- Intercommunality: CA Épinal

Government
  - Mayor (2020–2026): Mireille Claude Pitet
- Area^{1}: 11.42 km^{2} (4.41 sq mi)
- Elevation: 310 m (1,020 ft)
- Highest elevation: 390 m (1,280 ft)
- Lowest elevation: 308 m (1,010 ft)
- Population (2023): 1,521
  - Density: 133.2/km^{2} (345.0/sq mi)
- Time zone: UTC+01:00 (CET)
  - Summer (DST): UTC+02:00 (CEST)
- INSEE/Postal code: 88136 /88000
- ^{1} French Land Register data, which excludes lakes, ponds, glaciers > 1 km^{2} (0.386 sq mi or 247 acres) and river estuaries.

Dogneville (French pronunciation: [dɔɲvil]) is a commune in the Vosges department in Grand Est in northeastern France.

== See also ==
- Communes of the Vosges department
