= Vaudéville =

- Commune
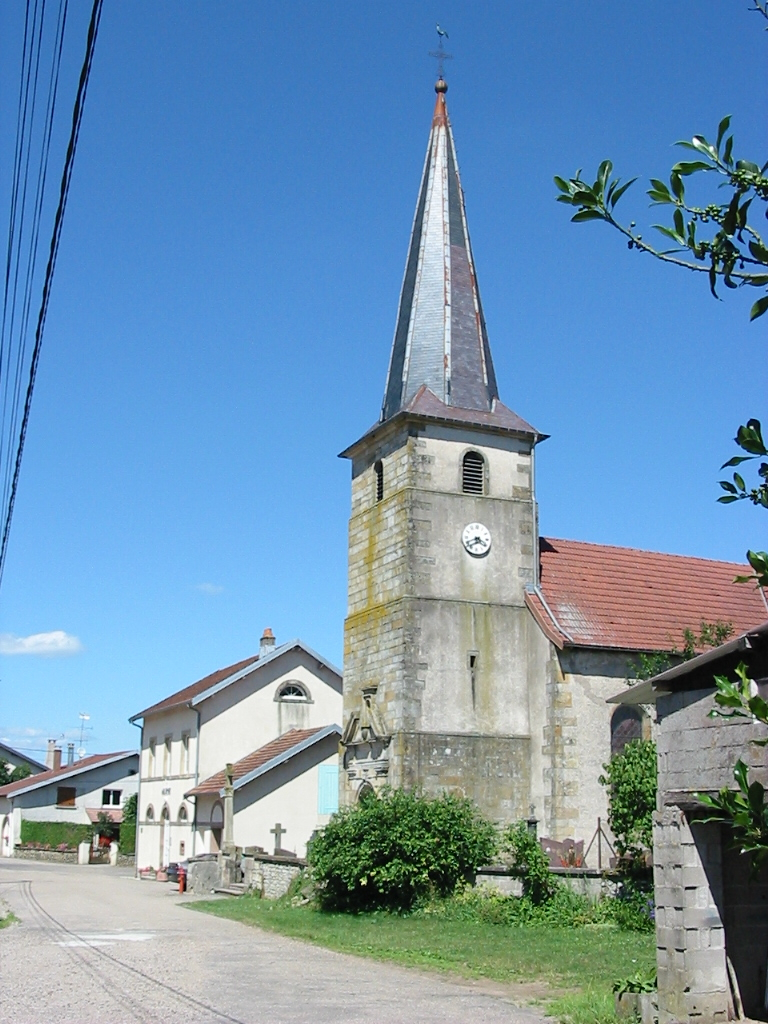
- The church in Vaudéville

- Coat of arms
- Location of Vaudéville
- Location within France Location within Grand Est
- Coordinates: 48°13′50″N 6°32′35″E
- Country: France
- Region: Grand Est
- Department: Vosges
- Arrondissement: Épinal
- Canton: Épinal-2
- Intercommunality: CA Épinal

Government
  - Mayor (2020–2026): Pascal Hauller
- Area^{1}: 3.22 km^{2} (1.24 sq mi)
- Elevation: 350 m (1,150 ft)
- Highest elevation: 362 m (1,188 ft)
- Lowest elevation: 328 m (1,076 ft)
- Population (2023): 199
  - Density: 61.8/km^{2} (160/sq mi)
- Time zone: UTC+01:00 (CET)
  - Summer (DST): UTC+02:00 (CEST)
- INSEE/Postal code: 88495 /88000
- ^{1} French Land Register data, which excludes lakes, ponds, glaciers > 1 km^{2} (0.386 sq mi or 247 acres) and river estuaries.

Vaudéville (French pronunciation: [vodevil]) is a commune in the Vosges department in Grand Est in northeastern France.

== See also ==
- Communes of the Vosges department
