= Water Street (album) =

Studio album by Sweatshop Union
- Released: August 5, 2008
- Genre: Canadian hip-hop
- Labels: Sweatshop Union Music; Look
- Producers: Conscience; Dave Knill; Doug Naugler; Dusty Melo; Itchy Ron; Metty The Dert Merchant; Marmalade; Preme Diesel; Rob The Viking

Sweatshop Union chronology
United We Fall (2005)	Water Street (2008)	Infinite (2013)

Professional ratings
Review scores
Source	Rating
HipHopDX	3/5
PopMatters	8/10
RapReviews	7.5/10
The Phoenix	4/5 stars

Water Street is the fourth studio album by Canadian hip-hop group Sweatshop Union. It was released on August 5, 2008 via Sweatshop Union Music and Look Records. Production was handled by Dusty Melodica, Mr. Marmalade, Conscience, Metty The Dert Merchant, Rob The Viking, DJ Itchy Ron, Dave Knill, Doug Naugler and Preme Diesel. It features guest appearances from Evil Ebenezer, Mat the Alien and Moka Only.

== Track listing ==
No.	Title	Writer(s)	Producer(s)	Length
1.	"Now"		Conscience; Dave Knill	2:49
2.	"Goldrush"	Colin Michael McCue; Steve Lorne Messinger; Lee Robert Napthine; Bryan Thomas Trevitt	Metty The Dert Merchant	3:27
3.	"Oh My"	Golmorad Moshiri; Trevitt	Metty The Dert Merchant	3:51
4.	"Time Machine" (featuring Mat The Alien)		Dusty Melo; Marmalade	3:35
5.	"So Tired"	McCue; Napthine	Dusty Melo; Marmalade	3:45
6.	"Blah Blah Blah"	McCue	Dusty Melo; Itchy Ron	0:58
7.	"Comes & Goes"	David Harold Coles	Rob The Viking; Doug Naugler	4:28
8.	"Jeers"		Dusty Melo; Marmalade	2:50
9.	"Pot of Stew"	Messinger	Dusty Melo; Conscience	2:39
10.	"Mashed Potatoes" (featuring Evil)	McCue	Dusty Melo; Marmalade	2:19
11.	"High Grade"	Messinger; Moshiri; Ronnie Mejia; Geoff Allan Reich	Conscience	3:32
12.	"Cities of Gods"	Messinger	Conscience	2:48
13.	"Shoot Low" (featuring Moka Only)	McCue	Dusty Melo	3:53
14.	"Itchy Rock"		Itchy Ron	1:42
15.	"Gutter Ball"	McCue	Dusty Melo	1:10
16.	"It's Alright"		Metty The Dert Merchant	3:44
17.	"Never Go Home"	McCue; Napthine	Dusty Melo; Marmalade	1:13
18.	"Sunnyside Motel"		Dusty Melo; Marmalade	3:00
19.	"Timelines"		Rob The Viking	3:10
20.	"Moose"		Rob The Viking	3:36
21.	"Said and Done"		Dusty Melo; Marmalade	3:29
22.	"So Many People"	Messinger	Preme Diesel	3:58
23.	"Dig a Grave"	Trevitt; Robin Wilfred Hooper	Metty The Dert Merchant; Rob The Viking	7:37

== Personnel ==
- Steve "Conscience" Messinger – songwriter, producer
- Bryan "Metty The Dert Merchant" Trevitt – songwriter, producer
- Mos Eisley – songwriter
- Dusty Melodica – songwriter, producer
- Lee "Mr. Marmalade" Napthine – songwriter, producer
- David "Kyprios" Coles – songwriter
- Daniel "Moka Only" Denton – songwriter, featured artist
- Gaelan "Evil Ebenezer" Bleasdale – songwriter, featured artist
- Mat "The Alien" Andrew – scratching, featured artist
- Jamie "Preme Diesel" Kuse – songwriter, producer, programming, mixing, engineering
- Dave Knill – songwriter, producer, programming
- Ronnie "DJ Itchy Ron" Mejia – songwriter, scratching
- Kevin Coles – background vocals, guitar, bass
- Warren Flandez – background vocals
- Paul Gibbons – guitar
- Chris Gestrin – piano
- Robin "Rob The Viking" Hooper – producer, engineering
- Geoff "Stylust" Reich – engineering
