= Kyprios =

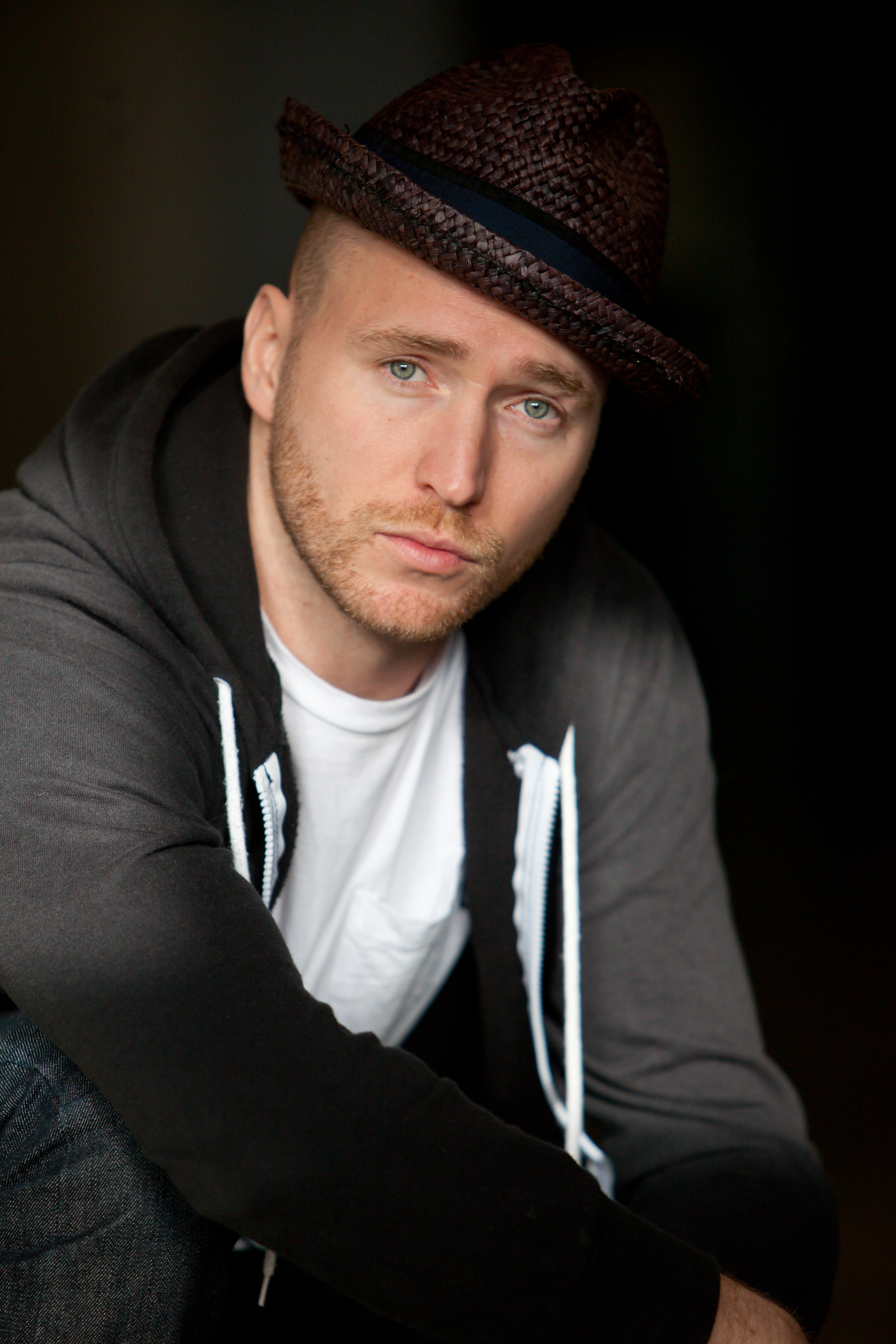
- Kyprios at TEDx Vancouver in 2010.

Background information
- Born: David Coles
- Origin: North Vancouver, British Columbia, Canada
- Genres: Hip-hop
- Occupations: Rapper; singer; songwriter; actor
- Years active: 2000-present
- Labels: Columbia Records; Indy Visual Records
- Formerly of: Sweatshop Union

David H. Coles, better known by his stage name Kyprios, is a Canadian rapper, singer, songwriter and actor.

== Career ==
Formerly associated with the musical collective Sweatshop Union, he now records and performs exclusively as a solo artist. He appeared on all of Sweatshop Union's albums up to and including 2008's Water Street, as well as releasing three solo albums, Say Something in 2004, 12:12 in 2009, and The Midnight Sun in 2014.

Say Something was nominated for the Juno Award for Rap Recording of the Year at the 2005 Juno Awards, and his song "Ignorance Is Beautiful" was nominated for the Genie Award for Best Achievement in Music – Original Song at the 2005 Genie Awards.

In 2010, he was named the winner of CKPK-FM's Peak Performance Project, a contest for emerging musicians in Vancouver, winning over second-place finishers Said the Whale. His prize in the contest was $100,500.

After announcing his departure from Sweatshop Union in early 2011, he released two singles: "City Woman", which blends original lyrics with a re-recorded version of The Stampeders' hit "Sweet City Woman", and "How the West Was Won", a tribute to the Vancouver Canucks which he co-wrote with Rob the Viking of Swollen Members. The Lap Dog EP was released in 2012.

On April 7, 2012, Kyprios was guest editor of the Vancouver Sun and contributed a livestream video.

His most recent solo album, Midnight Sun, was released in 2014. The album included collaborations with Moka Only, D-Sisive, Warren Dean Flandez and Ryan Guldemond.

== Discography ==
- Say Something (2004)
- 12:12 (2009)
- The Lap Dog (2012)
- The Midnight Sun (2014)
