= Vaudeville (album) =

Studio album by D-Sisive
- Released: June 22, 2010
- Genre: Hip hop
- Length: 55:27
- Label: Urbnet Records

D-Sisive chronology
Jonestown (2009)	Vaudeville (2010)	Jonestown 2: Jimmy Go Bye Bye (2011)

Professional ratings
Review scores
Source	Rating
RapReviews	7.5/10

Vaudeville is a 2010 album by Canadian rapper D-Sisive. The first single from the album was '"Ray Charles (Looking For a Star)". The album sees D-Sisive experiment with a broader range of styles, including pop influences such as those seen on the single "I Love a Girl".

== Track listing ==
1. Vaudeville (Friends Forever)
2. The Riot Song
3. Shotgun Wedding
4. Just An Ostrich
5. Ray Charles (Looking For A Star) (with King Reign)
6. The Night My Baby Died (with Muneshine)
7. Percocet
8. Never Knew Me
9. Liberace (with Ron Sexsmith)
10. Scaredy Cat
11. Wichita
12. I Love A Girl
13. Aeroplane
14. Bonus Track: West Coast
15. Bonus Track: West Coast (Remix with Moka Only)
