= D-Sisive =

Canadian rapper

- Also known as: Orville Knoblich
- Born: Derek Christoff
- Origin: Toronto, Ontario, Canada
- Genres: Hip-hop, alternative hip hop
- Years active: 1996–present
- Labels: Urbnet Records; Droppin' Science
- Website: https://urbnet.com/d-sisive

Derek Christoff, better known by his stage name D-Sisive, is a Canadian rapper, best known for his Juno-nominated EP The Book, his hit single "Nobody with a Notepad" (for which D-Sisive and collaborator Muneshine won the 2009 annual SOCAN Songwriting Prize) and his 2009 Polaris Music Prize-nominated album Let the Children Die (which was launched by the success of "Nobody with a Notepad").

== Career ==
=== Beginnings and withdrawal from spotlight ===
D-Sisive first emerged in the late 1990s with a number of independent singles which were popular in the Toronto hip-hop scene, but took a six-year break from performing and writing due to a battle with depression following his mother's death in 1997 and father's death in 2007. The death of his mother inspired him to release the EP J.A.C., named after her, while Christoff's response to losing his parents is heavily documented on releases such as The Book and Let the Children Die.

Despite this absence, his talents were showcased on DJ Format's popular 2005 album If You Can't Join 'Em... Beat 'Em, and Christoff performed alongside fellow Canadian rapper Abdominal in the music video for DJ Format's hit single '3 Feet Deep'. Further, a collection of recordings from the early period of D-Sisive's career has been released on a widely available bootleg entitled Yesterday. The Mixtape.

D-Sisive also collaborated with actor Stu Stone, co-writing the track "Rollin' with Saget". The song was the lead single of the Blowin' Up album from Stone and fellow actor Jamie Kennedy. Actor Bob Saget guested on the song and appeared in the video.

=== Return (2008–present) ===
Christoff's bout of writer's block came to an end when he was unexpectedly inspired by lyrics spontaneously coming to him while singing along to The Beach Boys' "Wouldn't It Be Nice" on the radio — lyrics that became his breakthrough hit, "Brian Wilson". He signed to URBNET Records, which released The Book on June 3, 2008, and Let the Children Die on May 3, 2009. Later that year, D-Sisive took part in an interactive documentary series called City Sonic. The series, which featured 20 Toronto artists, had him reflecting on Planet Mars, an underground hip-hop showcase that changed his life. Christoff capped off his SOCAN award win and closed 2009 with a free album entitled Jonestown.

2010 saw the release of another album, Vaudeville, as well as numerous singles, including a song inspired by the documentary Anvil! The Story of Anvil and a music video entitled 'First Winter' for The C4 Experiment hosted by Christopher Walken. Christoff also began working with rapper Buck 65 for an upcoming collaborative album entitled The Ricardo Christoff Apparatus. In early 2011, D-Sisive continued his Hijacked series with a single entitled 'If I Live To See Tomorrow', based on a song by Sigur Rós. The release of a new album, Jonestown 2: Jimmy Go Bye Bye, scheduled for free distribution online in late 2010, has been pushed back to later in 2011. On January 14, 2011, it was announced via Christoff's Twitter that he was nearly done work on his long-rumoured charity single, "Live Your Life (The World Song)" feat. Buck 65, Punky Brewster, Jamie Hyneman from MythBusters, 1980s Leonard Cohen, Stompin' Tom Connors, and Gucci Mane. The song is set for a Valentine's Day release.

In January 2019, Christoff was the featured guest in Cypher, a webseries pilot funded by the Telus Fund. The pilot marked Christoff's re-emergence into the music scene after a four-year hiatus on account of mental health. The pilot features a new song, "Tell Me." The series was greenlit for a full season in February, with Christoff staying on as the series music supervisor, collaborating in each episode with a different Canadian bands or artist.

=== Name change ===
In late 2010, D-Sisive announced that he was changing his stage name to Derek From Northcliffe, a nod to his childhood home's street name, citing misspelling by venues as a major contributing factor. However, following an apparent change of heart regarding the change, Christoff flirted with the idea of simply operating under his birth name. Currently, it is not known which name Christoff will pursue, an issue that the rapper wryly addressed by crediting his first 2011 release to 'Derek (From Northcliffe) D-Sisive Christoff'.

=== Lamont Dozier sample controversy ===
Controversy interrupted D-Sisive's 2009 winning streak when it was revealed that "Nobody with a Notepad" borrowed heavily from "Peddlin Music On The Side," an early-70s solo recording by legendary songwriter Lamont Dozier (who, with Holland-Dozier-Holland wrote many of Motown's biggest hits of the 1960s). "Nobody With A Notepad" contains extensive instrumental, melodic and vocal sections of Dozier's composition and recording, including Lamont's unaltered vocal performance. After Dozier's initial efforts to privately resolve D-Sisive's unauthorized use of his material were rebuffed, Dozier sued D-Sisive (and his producer and label) for copyright infringement in August and the lawsuit was amicably settled a few months later.

=== #LetDerekSwim phenomenon ===
Since February 2021, D-Sisive had made headlines on blogTO after having made numerous attempts to contact Drake through social media platform Instagram to ask if he can swim in his multi-million-dollar swimming pad. D-Sisive, as of May 6, 2023 has not yet received a response.

== Discography ==
=== Albums ===
Solo

- Let the Children Die (2009)
- Jonestown (2009)
- Vaudeville (2010)
- Jonestown 2: Jimmy Go Bye Bye (2011)
- Run with the Creeps (2011)
- Jonestown 3: The Dream Is Over (2012)

Collaborative

- Wolves (2013) (with Bix, Ghettosocks, Muneshine & Timbuktu, as Wolves)

=== EPs, mixtapes, singles ===
EPs

- J.A.C. (Just a Child / Joan Anne Christoff) (1999)
- D-Day (1999)
- The Book (2008)
- Like This (Plus Three) EP (2008)
- Nobody with a Notepad (Plus Three) EP (2008)
- Raging Bull (2013) (with Tone Mason)
- Cloth Soup (2015) (as Orville Knoblich)
- Knoblich Gardens [one] (2022)
- The Playground [one] (2022)
- Knoblich Gardens [two] (2022)
- The Playground [two] (2023)
- Knoblich Gardens [three]: The Blue Boat (2023)

Mixtapes

- Yesterday: The Mixtape (1997–2003) (2003)
- The Idiot: Hijacked (2008)
- Knoblich: The Complete '08 Comeback Special (2008)
- Asian Elvis (The Mixtape) (2012)
- The D.Ark Tape (2013) (with The Arkeologists)
- The Great Mr. Nobody (One) (2014)
- Farty's Oyster Barn Presents... Pass The Nog! D-Sisive Croons the Ol' Christmas Classics at the Yuletide Jamboree (2014)
- Vanilla Ice - To the Extreme: Hijacked (2015)
- I’ll Change Your Life If You Change Mine [aboyinaroom] (2015)
- The Foolish Follies of Fatty Arbuckle (2016)

Singles

- "Lost Sight" featuring Abdominal (1999)
- "Like This" (featuring Guilty Simpson and DJ Grouch) (2008)
- "Nobody With A Notepad" (2008)
- "Wonderful World" (2009)
- "West Coast" (2009)
- "Anvil" (2010)
- "Ray Charles (Looking For a Star)" (2010)
- "I Love a Girl" (2010)
- "First Winter" (2010)
- "If I Live to See Tomorrow" (2011)
