= Southpaw: Music from and Inspired by the Motion Picture =

2015 film soundtrack album

Southpaw (Music from and Inspired by the Motion Picture)

Soundtrack album by Various artists
- Released: July 24, 2015
- Recorded: July 2015
- Genre: Hip hop
- Length: 56:41
- Labels: Shady; Interscope
- Producers: Eminem (also exec.); Paul Rosenberg; AraabMuzik; Charley Hustle; DJ Khalil; DJ Premier; Doc McKinney; Frank Dukes; Illangelo; CertiFYD; Just Blaze; Kasanova; Luis Resto; Mr. Porter; Rico Love; Sarom

Shady Records chronology
Shady XV (2014)	Southpaw (Music from and Inspired by the Motion Picture) (2015)

Singles from Southpaw (Music from and Inspired by the Motion Picture)
- 1. "Phenomenal" Released: June 2, 2015; 2. "Kings Never Die" Released: July 10, 2015; 3. "R.N.S." Released: July 16, 2015

Professional ratings
Review scores
Source	Rating
AllMusic	3.5/5 stars
Drowned in Sound	6/10

Southpaw (Music from and Inspired by the Motion Picture) is the official soundtrack to the 2015 film of the same name. The album, performed by various artists, was released on Shady Records and Interscope Records on July 24, 2015.

== Background ==
This soundtrack has spawned the singles "Phenomenal" and "Kings Never Die" featuring Gwen Stefani, by American rapper Eminem and "R.N.S." by hip hop group Slaughterhouse. This album, along with the film, was dedicated in memory of James Horner, the film's composer, who was killed in a plane crash on June 22, 2015, making this the last film score he composed in his lifetime. "Cry For Love" also appears on the film's score album in longer form.

== Commercial performance ==
The album debuted at number 5 on the US Billboard 200 and number 2 on the US Top R&B/Hip-Hop Albums, selling 45,000 copies in the first week, including streams (32,000 pure album sales). In its second week, the album sold 15,500 more copies (including streams) for a total 60,500 copies sold in the United States. In the third week, the album fell to number 41, selling over 8,800 copies (including streams) for a total 69,000 copies. As of January 2017, the album has sold 91,000.

== Usage in media ==
"What About the Rest of Us" by Action Bronson ft. Joey Badass & Rico Love is featured in the video game WWE 2K17.

== Track listing ==
No.	Title	Writer(s)	Producer(s)	Length
1.	"Cry for Love (Part 1)" (James Horner)			1:27
2.	"Kings Never Die" (Eminem featuring Gwen Stefani)	Marshall Mathers; Luis Resto; Khalil Abdul-Rahman; Erik Alcock; Chin Injeti; Liz Rodrigues	DJ Khalil; Eminem^{[a]}	4:56
3.	"Beast (Southpaw Remix)" (Rob Bailey and The Hustle Standard featuring Busta Rhymes, KXNG CROOKED and Tech N9ne)	Charles "Hustle" Caripides; Rob Bailey; Mathers; Abdul-Rahman; Trevor Smith; Dominick Wickliffe; Aaron Yates	Charley Hustle; DJ Khalil^{[b]}	4:39
4.	"This Corner" (Denaun)	Mathers; L. Resto; Mario Resto; Denaun Porter; Marvin O'Neal	Eminem; Resto^{[a]}; Mr. Porter^{[a]}	3:53
5.	"What About the Rest of Us" (Action Bronson and Joey Bada$$ featuring Rico Love)	Ariyan Arslani; Richard Butler Jr.; Cecil "Kasanova" Kirby; Jo-Vaughn Virginie; Curtis Mayfield	Rico Love; Kasanova	4:12
6.	"Raw" (Bad Meets Evil)	Mathers; Ryan Montgomery; Raymond "Sarom" Diaz	Sarom; CertiFYD	3:40
7.	"R.N.S." (Slaughterhouse)	Joe Budden; Joell Ortiz; Wickliffe; Abraham Orellana; Justin Smith; O'Shea Jackson; Anthony Wheaton; Betty Mabry; Fred Mühlböck	AraabMuzik; Just Blaze	3:39
8.	"Wicked Games" (The Weeknd)	Abel Tesfaye; Carlo Montagnese; Doc McKinney; Rainer Blancheur	Doc McKinney; Illangelo	5:24
9.	"All I Think About" (Bad Meets Evil)	Mathers; Montgomery; L. Resto	Eminem; Resto^{[a]}	6:12
10.	"Drama Never Ends" (50 Cent)	Curtis Jackson; Adam Feeney	Frank Dukes	3:16
11.	"Mode" (PRhyme featuring Logic)	Montgomery; Christopher Martin; Adrian Younge; Robert Hall II	DJ Premier	3:01
12.	"Notorious Thugs" (The Notorious B.I.G. featuring Bone Thugs-n-Harmony)	Christopher Wallace; Sean Combs; Bryon McCane; Steven Howse; Anthony Henderson; Steven Jordan	Stevie J; Sean Combs	6:07
13.	"Phenomenal" (Eminem)	Mathers; L. Resto; M. Resto	Eminem; Resto^{[a]}	4:42
14.	"Cry for Love (Part 2)" (James Horner)			1:33
Total length:				56:41

Notes

- ^{^a} signifies an additional producer
- ^{^b} signifies a remixer

The tracks "Wicked Games" and "Notorious Thugs" were previously released on the projects House of Balloons (and later Trilogy) and Life After Death respectively.

== Charts ==
=== Weekly charts ===
Chart (2015)	Peak position
Australian Albums (ARIA)	13
Austrian Albums (Ö3 Austria)	70
Belgian Albums (Ultratop Flanders)	150
Belgian Albums (Ultratop Wallonia)	147
Canadian Albums (Billboard)	2
French Albums (SNEP)	108
German Albums (Offizielle Top 100)	61
New Zealand Albums (RMNZ)	20
Swiss Albums (Schweizer Hitparade)	43
UK Compilation Albums (Official Charts)	15
UK Soundtrack Albums (Official Charts)	1
UK R&B Albums (Official Charts)	2
US Billboard 200	5
US Top R&B/Hip-Hop Albums (Billboard)	2
US Soundtrack Albums (Billboard)	1

=== Year-end charts ===
Chart (2015)	Position
US Top R&B/Hip-Hop Albums (Billboard)	53
US Soundtrack Albums (Billboard)	18

== See also ==
- Southpaw: Original Motion Picture Soundtrack
- List of Billboard number-one Rap albums of 2015
