= Kinda Like a Big Deal =

Single by Clipse featuring Kanye West

from the album Til the Casket Drops
- Released: April 20, 2009
- Genre: Hip-hop
- Length: 3:26
- Label: Star Trak; Re-Up; Columbia
- Songwriters: Khalil Abdul-Rahman; Pranam Injeti; Terrence Thornton; Gene Thornton; Kanye West
- Producers: DJ Khalil; Chin Injeti

Clipse singles chronology
"Set It Off" (2008)	"Kinda Like a Big Deal" (2009)	"I'm Good" (2009)

Kanye West singles chronology
"Knock You Down" (2009)	"Kinda Like a Big Deal" (2009)	"Walkin' on the Moon" (2009)
- "Kinda Like a Big Deal" on YouTube

Professional ratings
Review scores
Source	Rating
Rolling Stone	4/5 stars

"Kinda Like a Big Deal" is a song by the American rap duo Clipse, released as the first single from their third studio album, Til the Casket Drops. The song features a verse by fellow American rapper Kanye West. The cover artwork is made by KAWS.

== Recording ==
"Kinda Like a Big Deal" was produced by DJ Khalil and Chin Injeti. It was the first song by Clipse not produced by the Neptunes, the duo's frequent collaborators.

The song's instrumental is based on an electric guitar, played by Chin Injeti. He recorded 10 minutes of material, which Khalil later sliced into smaller fragments and used to build the instrumental. According to him, he achieved the song's distinctive sound accidentally: Reason software he used to sequence the song had a mastering suite, which he applied before the track was finished.

After the instrumental was finished, Pusha T and his manager visited Khalil's studio. Despite falling asleep from exhaustion, upon hearing this beat Pusha T woke up and started rapping to it. He left the studio with the beat, and several months later informed Khalil that the duo recorded the song using it. The song also included a verse from Kanye West, which was originally intended for T.I.'s song "On Top of the World" off the album Paper Trail.

The producers faced issues while mixing "Kinda Like a Big Deal". Four versions of the song were created, with Kanye West's frequent collaborator Mike Dean and Dr. Dre's mixing engineer Steve Baughman recording their versions. DJ Khalil created the final version of the song.

== Composition ==
With "Kinda Like a Big Deal", DJ Khalil and Chin Injeti were aiming to recreate the 1970s rock sound. In an interview with Exclaim!, Chin Injeti said they were "trying to get a vibe like something from Apocalypse Now meets the Meters". The beat, described by Rolling Stone's Christian Hoard as "rumbling", is centered around a section from Injeti's electric guitar solo. DJ Khalil applied several sound effects to it, including a reverb and wah-wah. He then accidentally applied a mastering suite, drastically changing the sound. Khalil himself describes the resulting sound as "smashed, overcompressed" and says he did not fully understand how it worked. "It somehow controlled the chaos", said the producer.

Several other elements are present throughout the song. Once DJ Khalil was done with the guitar, he added a percussion loop. Due to the lack of quantization, he adjusted it by ear. Roman Cooper of HipHopDX described the percussion of the song as "primal drums". After he was finished with the drums, DJ Khalil also added an electric organ, a bassline, and various sound effects, including a sound which he describes as a screaming voice, created using a heavily modulated guitar sound.

== Release ==
"Kinda Like a Big Deal" was initially scheduled to release on March 9, 2009, but was postponed. The duo premiered the song on the Virginia Beach radio show "Talk of the Town" on April 20, 2009. Later that day they made the song available on their own Re-Up blog. "Kinda Like a Big Deal" was released as the first single from the duo's fourth album, Til the Casket Drops, featuring a cover art designed by Kaws. According to Pusha T, the duo planned a larger release, but as they were mastering the song it was leaked online, forcing them to release it earlier than planned.

An official remix featuring Bun B was released on April 30, 2009.

=== Music video ===
A music video, directed by Bernard Gourley, was released on June 23, 2009. It was shot in a Brooklyn apartment building and features Clipse and Kanye West rapping while sitting in a dimly lit stairwell and riding an elevator.

== Charts ==
Weekly chart performance for "Kinda Like a Big Deal"
Chart (2009)	Peak position
US Bubbling Under R&B/Hip-Hop Singles (Billboard)	19
