= The Confessional (album) =

Mixtape by Bishop Lamont
- Released: June 10, 2008
- Recorded: 2007–2008
- Genres: West Coast hip hop; underground; pop-rap
- Length: 77:29
- Labels: Aftermath; Interscope
- Producers: Dr. Dre (also exec.); Bink!; Che Vicious; Dae One; Danja; Diverse; DJ Khalil; Focus...; Jake One; King Karnov; Mark Batson; Mr. Porter; Nottz; Scott Storch; Tha Bizness

Bishop Lamont chronology
The Confessional (2008)	The Shawshank Redemption/Angola 3 (2010)

The Confessional is a 2008 mixtape by Bishop Lamont. It was distributed by Aftermath Entertainment. An unofficial version was leaked before it was due to be released by DJ Strong.

== Production ==
The Confessional features Xzibit, Glasses Malone, Warren G, Stat Quo, Tha Bizness, Ras Kass, Busta Rhymes and many others. Production was mainly by producers such as Dr. Dre, Focus..., Scott Storch and DJ Khalil also play a big role in production. Other producers such as East Coast heavyweights like Nottz and Bink! also contributed to the mixtape as well. It was hosted by DJ Whoo Kid and presented by Diosece.

== Critical reception ==
Professional ratings
Review scores
Source	Rating
XXL	(favorable)

The mixtape was positively received, with XXL calling it "G-status, from beginning to end", commenting on Bishop Lamont's "Tight rhymes, sick flows and his ability to adjust his style to different beats".

== Track listing ==
No.	Title	Producer(s)	Length
1.	"The Confessional" (Intro)	Focus...	2:56
2.	"Africa" (featuring Soul Nana)	Bink!	4:11
3.	"Guerilla Pimpin'" (featuring Warren G, Busta Rhymes and Stat Quo)	Mark Batson; Che Vicious	4:54
4.	"Send A Nigga Home" (featuring Mr. Porter)	DJ Khalil	4:35
5.	"City Lights" (featuring Erik of The New Royales)	DJ Khalil	4:25
6.	"Ghetto Song" (featuring YM)	Nottz	3:27
7.	"What People Do"	Nottz	3:53
8.	"One Night" (featuring Mike Ant)	King Karnov	4:00
9.	"Right"	Scott Storch	3:43
10.	"Be Cool" (featuring Xzibit, Ras Kass, Glasses Malone and Mykestro)	Dae One	5:45
11.	"Better Than You"	Focus...	3:57
12.	"Kissin' Tha Curb" (featuring Busta Rhymes)	Jake One	3:34
13.	"The Name" (featuring Dirty Birdy, Kida and Flii Stylz)	Focus...	4:07
14.	"Everyday"	Diverse	3:47
15.	"Can't Figure It Out"	DJ Khalil	4:44
16.	"Donkey Kong Savage"	Danja	3:33
17.	"Why U Wanna Piss Me Off"	Nottz	3:08
18.	"All on My Dick" (featuring Taje & Indef)	Tha Bizness	5:05
19.	"The Greatest Trick"	Mr. Porter; Dr. Dre	3:45
Total length:			77:29

Track 5, “City Lights” would go on to feature on the soundtrack for racing game Midnight Club: Los Angeles.
