= Chin Injeti discography =

The discography of Chin Injeti consists of his work with "Bass is Base", his Solo Career and tracks he has written/produced on.

== Bass is Base ==
=== Singles ===
1994 Funkmobile (Soul Shack)
1995 Straw Six & Brix (Soul Shack)
1995 Westside Funk (Soul Shack)
1995 Diamond Dreams (Loose Cannon/A & M)
1996 I Cry (Loose Cannon/A & M)

=== Albums ===
1994 First Impressions For The Bottom Jigglers (Soul Shack)
1995 Memories Of The Soulshack Survivors (Loose Cannon/A & M)

=== Videos ===
1994 Funkmobile
1996 I Cry

== Solo career ==
=== Daydreaming (2001) ===
No.	Title	Track Credit(s)	Length
1	Magic	(Inetji, Clarke, Kershaw) - EMI April Music (Canada) ltd. / Chin's Chunes (SOCAN) / Fi Low Music / Gobstopper Music (SOCAN)	4:02
2	B-Boys Fly Girls	(Injeti) EMI April Music (Canada) ltd. / Chin's Chunes (SOCAN)	1:29
3	Daydreaming	(Franklin) Springtime Music Inc. (BMI)	3:18
4	Sol G	(Message)	0:07
5	Anything	(Injeti, Ward, Frank) EMI April Music (Canada) ltd. / Chin's Chunes (SOCAN). Chrysalis / Bluebear Waltzes (SOCAN) EMI April Music Inc. / Griff Griff Music (ASCAP)	3:27
6	Don't Let The Boogie Pass	(Injeti) EMI April Music (Canada) ltd. / Chin's Chunes (SOCAN)	3:53
7	Give Away Your Soul (ft. Moka Only	(Injeti, Denton) EMI April Music (Canada) Ltd. / Chin's Chunes (SOCAN). EMI April Music (Canada) Ltd. / Moka Only	2:03
8	Rejoice	(Injeti) EMI April Music (Canada) ltd. / Chin's Chunes (SOCAN)	4:10
9	Show Me Love	(Injeti) EMI April Music (Canada) ltd. / Chin's Chunes (SOCAN)	4:29
10	Wireless	(Injeti) EMI April Music (Canada) ltd. / Chin's Chunes (SOCAN)	1:12
11	Logical Song	(Hodgson, Davies) Almo Music Corp / Delicated Music (ASCAP)	3:48
12	If You Ask Me	(Injeti) EMI April Music (Canada) ltd. / Chin's Chunes (SOCAN)	5:15
13	What We Could Be	(Injeti) EMI April Music (Canada) ltd. / Chin's Chunes (SOCAN)	0:29
14	Give	(Injeti) EMI April Music (Canada) ltd. / Chin's Chunes (SOCAN)	4:59
15	Anything [Video Mix]	(Injeti, Ward, Frank) EMI April Music (Canada) ltd. / Chin's Chunes (SOCAN). Chrysalis / Bluebear Waltzes (SOCAN) EMI April Music Inc. / Griff Griff Music (ASCAP)	3:48

The Players:

Chin Injeti - Keyboards, bass, electric and acoustic guitars, turntable scratches, drum programming, lead and background vocals.
Jamie Kaufmann - Drums
Murray Atkinson - Guitar
Brad Turner - Keyboards
Russ Kline - Guitar
David Kershaw - Keyboards
"The People Get Ready Choir" - Vocals
Suk Sandu (Coach) - Guitar
Kenny Sam - Tablas (ointatateh)
Moka Only - Vocals
Sahara MacDonald - Vocals
Kaythryn Rose - Vocals

=== D'tach (2010) ===
No.	Title	Producer(s)	Writer(s)	Length
1	Who I Am	Chin Injeti	Chin Injeti	2:59
2	Julian's Fiya	Chin Injeti	Chin Injeti	0:30
3	Fiya Fiya	Chin Injeti/Alastair Waithe	Chin Injeti	3:54
4	Don't Shake It Down	Chin Injeti	Chin Injeti	3:59
5	Separated (ft. The New Royales)	Chin Inetji/DJ Khalil	Chin Injeti/Liz Rodrigues/Erik Alcock/Khalil Abdul Rahman	4:41
6	Love Is Not War (ft. Zaki Ibrahim)	Adrian Eccleston	Chin Injeti/Liz Rodrigues/Erik Alcock/Adrian Eccleston	4:36
7	Mask On My Face (ft. K'naan	Chin Injeti	Chin Injeti/K'naan	4:10
8	D'tach Yourself	Chin Injeti	Chin Injeti	0:58
9	In The End	Chin Injeti	Chin Injeti/Liz Rodrigues/Erik Alcock	3:26

=== Re'tach EP (2011) ===
No.	Title	Producer(s)	Writer(s)	Length
1	Fiya Fiya (Re'tach Version)	Chin Injeti/Alastair Waithe (DJ Khalil Remix)	Chin Injeti	3:12
2	Love Is Not War (ft. ..of giants)	Adrian Eccleston (Joel Shearer Remix)	Chin Injeti/Liz Rodrigues/Erik Alcock/Adrian Eccleston	3:54
3	Who I Am	Chin Injeti (KAIRO Remix)	Chin Injeti	3:49
4	Stay (ft. Moneca Delain)	Chin Injeti	Chin Injeti	3:12
5	Don't Shake It Down ft. Neeraja (Great Escape Version)	Chin Injeti	Chin Injeti	4:46

== Songwriter/Producer ==
- Moka Only - Lowdown Suite (2003)

”Moon Burn”

- Moka Only - The Desired Effect (2005)

”Beautiful”

- Ridley Bent – Blam! (album) (2005)
- Zaki Ibrahim - Eclectica (Episodes In Purple) (2008)

"You Choose"
"Computer Girl"
"Lost In You"

- 50 Cent - Before I Self Destruct (2009)

"Could've Been You feat. R Kelly "

- Drake - So Far Gone (2009)

"Fear"

- Clipse - Til the Casket Drops (2009)

"Kinda Like A Big Deal feat. Kanye West"
"There Was A Murder"

- Kinnie Starr - A Different Day (2010)

"High Heels"
"Another's Gone"
"Crow's Perspective"

- Zaki Ibrahim - For Colored Girls (Soundtrack) (2010)

"Ansomnia"

- Eminem - Recovery (2010)

"Talkin' 2 Myself"
"Almost Famous"

- EA Games Fight Night Championship (Co-Produced with DJ Khalil) (2011)

"Running Thru"
"China"
"Live 4 Tomorrow"
"Organ Man"
"Red"

- Defenders of the Faith (2011)

"All Tha Time (ft. Bishop Lamonte)

- 50 Cent - The Big 10 Mixtape (2011)

"Shootin' Guns"
