= Peely =

- Fortnite character
- Peely as he appears in Fortnite
- First appearance: "Season 8: X Marks the Spot"; Fortnite Battle Royale (2017); February 28, 2019
- Species: Anthropomorphic banana

Peely is an anthropomorphic banana character who appears in the Fortnite video game, developed and published by Epic Games. The character first appeared as an unlockable outfit in Season 8's battle pass of the first chapter of Fortnite Battle Royale.

== Development and design ==
Peely is an anthropomorphic banana with humanoid features. Kotaku writer Riley MacLeod noted that Peely has "oddly muscular arms and legs", while Jordan Gerblick of GamesRadar+ has noted Peely having a "doe-eyed gaze". Alternate designs of Peely have been included in the game, beginning with a Halloween-themed design, which first launched in October 2019 for that year's "Fortnitemares" event. This skin was a partially skeletal version of the original Peely outfit. In July 2020, "Unpeely", a skin featuring Peely without a peel was released for the game's "Summer Legends" cosmetics pack. By December 2023, there were twelve outfit variants of Peely.

== Appearances ==
Peely first appeared in "X Marks the Spot", which was Season 8 of the first chapter of Fortnite Battle Royale. The season ran from February through May 2019. In this season, Peely was unlocked at level 47 of the game's battle pass. In the subsequent Season 9, Peely escapes from an erupting volcano and heads into an underground vault with another character, named Jonesy. After time passes, Jonesy emerges from the vault, though apparently having blended Peely into a milkshake. Nevertheless, Peely is shown still sentient, flashing a smile. Epic released a cinematic short on YouTube to reveal Peely's "Fortnitemares" outfit, dubbed "Peely Bone". Peely later appears in the second season of Chapter 2, wearing a tuxedo.

In August 2021, Fortnite released its "Imposters" mode, similar in vein to the social deduction game Among Us. In the mode, imposters were given the ability to make all other players temporarily appear as Peely.

In Season 1 of Chapter 4 of Fortnite's narrative, Epic introduced "Peely's Plunder"–an augment, or buff, that allows players to track buried loot. Peely later appears in Chapter 5 of the game's storyline, where he is kidnapped.

A version of Peely as Wolverine, dubbed "Peelverine", is featured in the Chapter 5 Season 4 battle pass, with the season themed after Marvel and named "Absolute Doom". Peely was first seen using Wolverine's claws in the trailer for the previous Marvel season, Chapter 2 Season 4, titled "Nexus War".

Peely later appeared in the Chapter 6 Mini Season 2 battle pass, which was themed around The Simpsons, drawn in the show's signature art style. This version was called "Springfielder Peely", with an additional variant modeled after Professor Frink available to unlock.

=== Role in Epic Games v. Apple ===
Peely's design and "Agent Peely" outfit variant were mentioned during the 2021 trial for the lawsuit brought by Epic Games against Apple. The legal battle between Epic and Apple revolved around "the profits from the mobile iOS version" of Fortnite. The Agent Peely variant, which features Peely sporting a tuxedo, was referenced and shown by Apple's representation to provide a visual aid for what Fortnite players can do in the game's creative mode.

A lawyer representing Apple stated, "We thought it better to go with the suit than the naked banana since we are in federal court this morning". Though the Apple lawyer's statement was viewed as a joke by media outlets, it drew a response from Epic. A lawyer representing Epic asked for Matthew Weissinger, the developer-publisher's marketing director, to clarify if there was "anything inappropriate about Peely without clothes", to which Weissinger was quoted as stating "It's just a banana, ma'am". The exchange attracted media coverage, with The Washington Post's Shannon Liao writing that "Experts consulted by The Post described the exchange as irrelevant to antitrust — though amusing." In her ruling on the case, Judge Yvonne Gonzalez Rogers concurred with Weissinger's sentiments that Peely is just a "banana man", added that Apple's dressing of Peely in a tuxedo was done in "jest to reflect the general solemnity of a federal court proceeding", and called the "additional attire" unnecessary.

== Promotion and reception ==
Peely has made several appearances in Fortnite merchandising. In November 2019, a Funko Pop of Peely was released. Later, in 2021, Nintendo released their "Fortnite Fleet Force Bundle", which included a set of Joy-Con featuring a yellow Peely-themed controller. Also in 2021, McFarlane Toys released a 7" figurine of the Peely Bone outfit. Epic collaborated with American artist Kaws to release a Peely outfit themed after the artist's style. Epic Games also released a Christmas ornament based on Peely's "Polar Peely" variant outfit. In December 2023, Epic partnered with Lego to release a Lego version of a Peely variant outfit. The partnership was accompanied by a Lego-styled animated cinematic trailer featuring Peely. PowerA, an American video game accessory manufacturer, released Peely-themed accessories including controllers and Nintendo Switch cases in February 2024. In March 2025, Adidas and Epic collaborated, with the former releasing a line of Fortnite-themed Ultraboost sneakers; one pair was inspired and named after Peely.

The character has been noted to be a popularly-selected character, with Tanner Dedmon of ComicBook.com writing that Peely has "persisted between seasons and has become a frequent pick with different variations released." In November 2021, Heavy's Eli Becht wrote that "against all odds Peely has become an icon." Though a popular skin in the game, Peely and his design have bemused Fortnite's player base and media writers alike. Calling Peely a "silly skin", Patricia Hernandez of Kotaku wrote that "Peely has never 100% made sense. When the giant banana was introduced in Season 8, everyone seemed confused over its anatomy." Fellow Kotaku writer Ian Walker called Peely "grotesque". Writing for GameRevolution, Adam N. Roberts stated that "Peely, on its own, is already pretty strange looking. While a casual glance makes it seem like a guy in a banana suit, it's actually some kind of eldritch banana demon with skinny arms and legs". Walker similarly referred to Peely as a "Lovecraftian ghoul".

Variants of Peely have also attracted media coverage. Analyzing Peely's "Summer Legends" design, MacLeod wrote: "Props to Epic's artists: Peely's peel-less body is intensely evocative of actual bananas. When you look at him, you can practically feel the squishy, nubby sensation of peeling a banana that's been sitting in your beach cooler all day". Two Peely variants were included in a Dot Esports ranking of the ten best Fortnite skins: Peely's original variant was ranked at tenth, while his "Polar Peely" variant was ranked as the overall best, with the outlet noting that players who equip the Polar variant are "sweaty" and "mean business".
