= Adidas NMD =

Line of shoes produced by Adidas

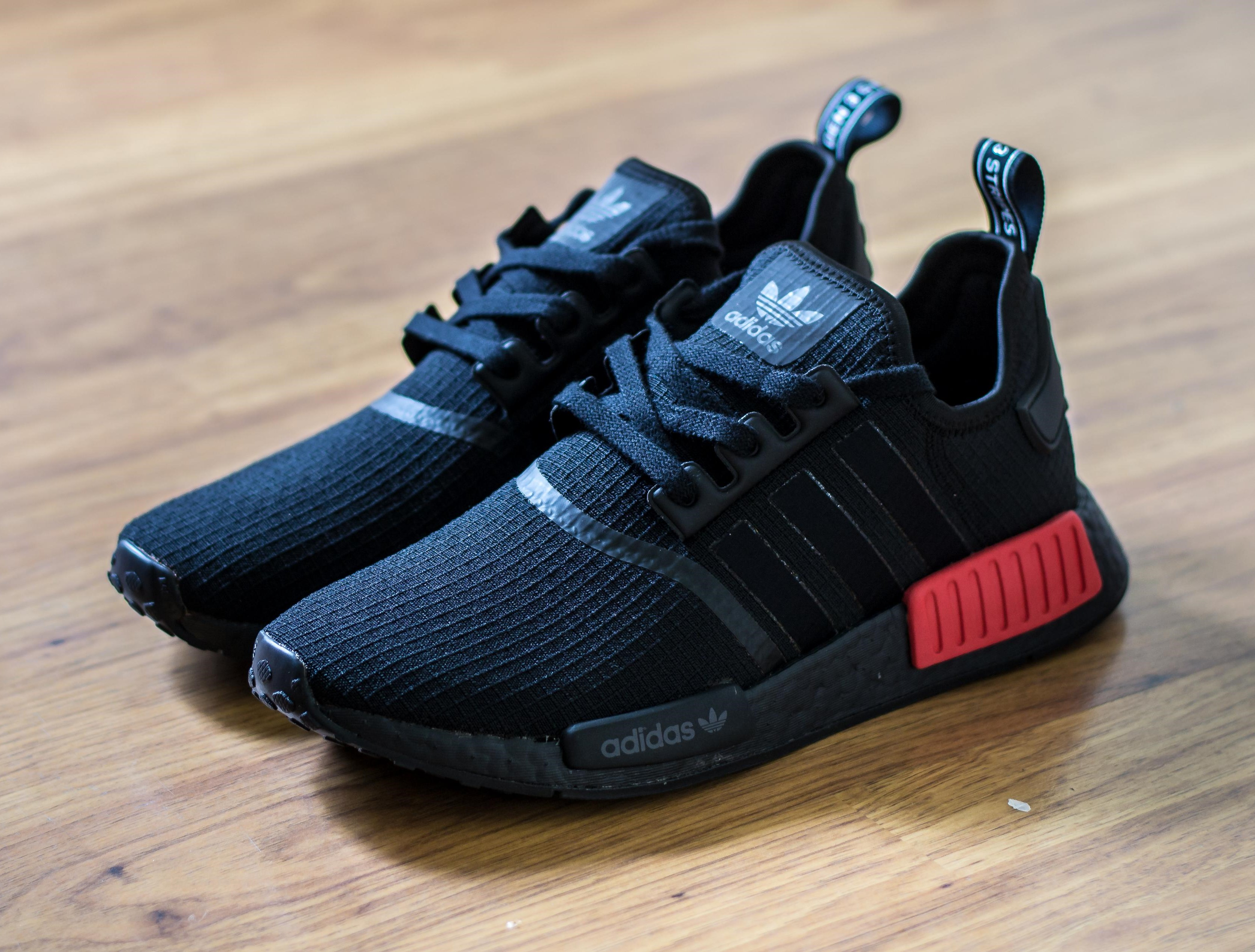
- Type: Sneakers
- Inventor: Adidas
- Inception: 2015; 11 years ago
- Manufacturer: Adidas
- Available: No; Discontinued in 2025
- Website: adidas.com

Adidas NMD is a line of running shoes released by Adidas in 2015. The shoes are best known for utilizing the company's Boost technology in the soles.

== History ==
The sneaker was released the same year as the Adidas Ultraboost on December 9, 2015, and was created to capitalize on the company's new Boost technology. The inspiration for the shoe came from wanting to take old designs from Adidas' past and blend them with new most recent designs and technology it had which is why it used its Primeknit uppers. The three shoes used for inspiration were the Boston Super, Micropacer, and Rising Star.

The name "NMD" stands for "nomad" which the company says was the inspiration for the shoe. Adidas wanted to create a shoe for someone who was always on the move and a global traveler; the shoe debuted in New York City.

The shoe was discontinued in 2025

== Popularity ==
The shoes rode on the popularity of the Yeezy line and Ultraboost shoes by being associated as the latest release by Adidas as the next fashionable shoe. The shoe was immediately sold out upon release and led to higher prices on the secondary market.

== Models ==
There have been various models of the shoe released with all of them following the same naming convention with "NMD" at the beginning, followed by an underscore and the model type. For instance, the original model is officially known as the NMD_XR1.

=== NMD_R1 ===
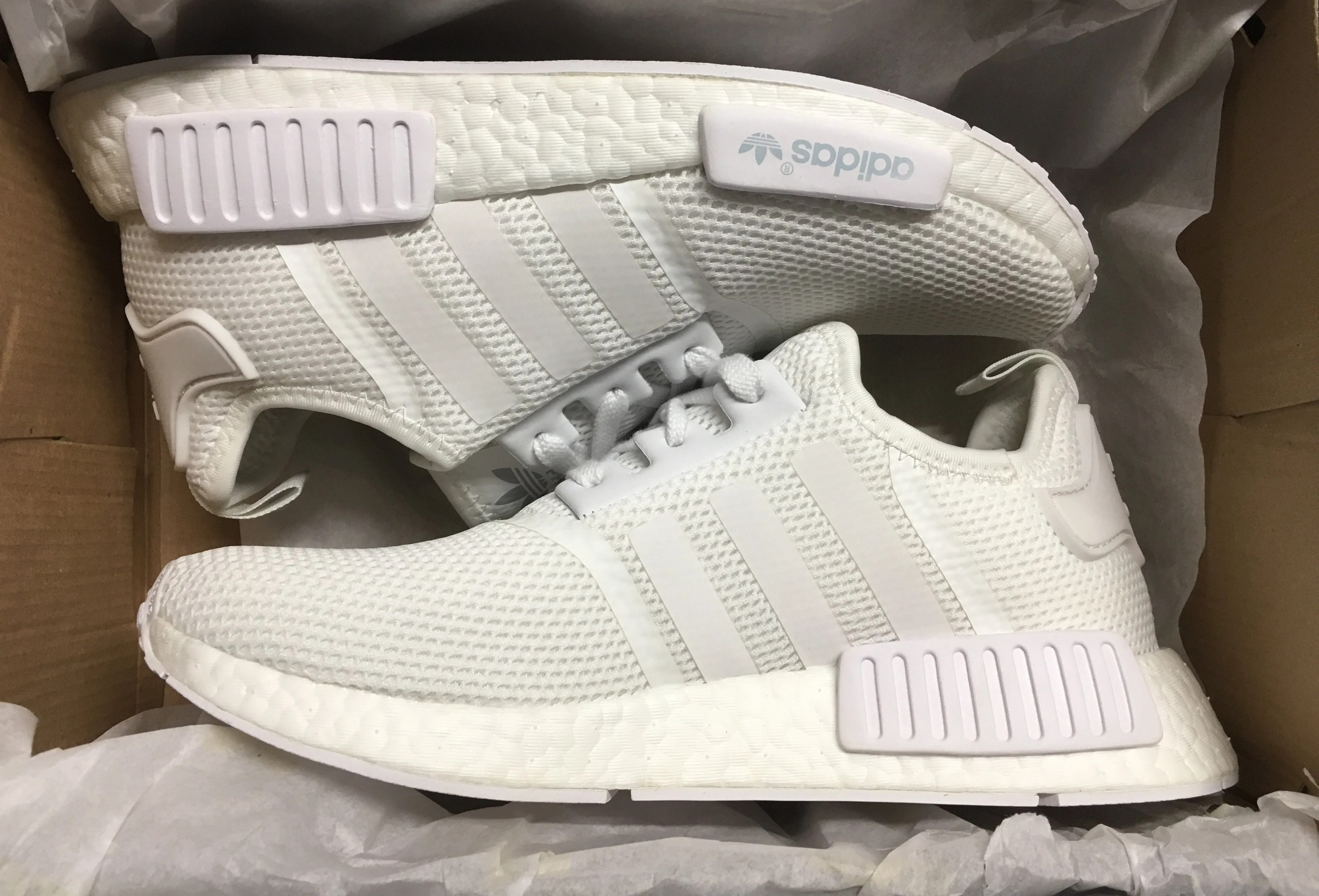
All white pair of Adidas NMD_R1

The original model of the NMD line. The shoe features a Primeknit upper with a Boost sole underneath. It features two plastics attachments on the side of the shoe in both the front and back. The front features the name and logo of Adidas. The back also has an additional plastic part on the upper part of the shoe.

=== NMD_R1 V2 ===
The second iteration of the shoe was launched on December 1, 2019. The shoe has the same features as the original but with more branding and an added heel tab that connects the EVA inserts in the sole.

=== NMD_S1 ===
Released in 2021, this modified version features the same knitted upper as the original but the sole is surrounded by a plastic frame all around it and has larger ridges underneath.

=== NMD_V3 ===
The third iteration of the original NMD line released in 2022, the design went back to look more similar to the original release and removed some features introduced in the V2. The shoe features a new material used in the knit upper and uses recycled materials including polyester and plastic.

=== NMD_W1 ===
This model was designed for female customers and features an elevated boost sole, making it a platform shoe. The upper also features an embroidery version of the three stripes and the guards on the sides of the shoes were changed from blocky rectangle shapes to round ovals. It was released in July 2023 in women's sizes only.

=== NMD_G1 ===
The NMD_G1 has a similar design to the original model but is made with at least 50% of recycled materials. The upper is reinforced with a textile upper as opposed to the original knitted upper. The first models were released in July 2023.
