= Kings Never Die =

2015 single by Eminem

Single by Eminem featuring Gwen Stefani

from the album Southpaw (Music from and Inspired By the Motion Picture)
- Released: July 10, 2015
- Studio: Effigy Studios (Detroit, MI)
- Genre: Rap rock
- Length: 4:56
- Label: Shady; Interscope
- Songwriters: Marshall Mathers; Luis Resto; Khalil Abdul-Rahman; Erik Alcock; Chin Injeti; Liz Rodrigues
- Producers: DJ Khalil; Eminem (add.); Gwen Stefani's vocal produced and engineered by Mischke

Eminem singles chronology
| "Phenomenal" (2015) | "Kings Never Die" (2015) | "Walk on Water" (2017) |

Gwen Stefani singles chronology
| "Spark the Fire" (2014) | "Kings Never Die" (2015) | "Used to Love You" (2015) |

Lyric video
- "Kings Never Die" on YouTube

"Kings Never Die" is a song by American rapper Eminem, from the soundtrack album Southpaw (Music from and Inspired By the Motion Picture), released on July 10, 2015. It features American singer Gwen Stefani, marking their first collaboration. The song is the second single released from the soundtrack, after Eminem's "Phenomenal" which was released a month earlier. "Kings Never Die" also marks Stefani's first featured single since 2005's "Can I Have It Like That" with Pharrell Williams. The song was co-written and produced by the New Royales.

== Background and release ==
Shady Records and Eminem were approached by Kurt Sutter and asked to executively produce a soundtrack for the 2015 film, Southpaw. Eminem has four songs on the soundtrack, including two from his collaborative effort – Bad Meets Evil. The other single from the soundtrack, "Phenomenal", is also from Eminem. The song was officially released on July 10, when the audio track was uploaded to YouTube. On July 29, the lyric video was uploaded to YouTube. This song talks about him (Eminem) being a king of rap and many people urging him to retire. Eminem says that he won't retire and will stay a king.

== Critical reception ==
On July 3, 2015, the full song leaked onto the internet, followed by a positive response from critics. Lars Brandle from Billboard Magazine stated that the song "is a muscular effort with a classic angry vibe, [but] it's hardly a knockout [and] absolutely worth a spin." Rap-Up Magazine thought that the song was a "triumphant rap-rock hybrid with rapid-fire rhymes.

== Commercial performance ==
"Kings Never Die" was the highest-ranking debut for the Billboard Hot 100 chart dated August 1, 2015, entering the chart at number 80. Its chart debut was supported by first-week digital download sales of 35,000 copies, along with 1.2 million domestic streams.

== Track listing ==
Digital download

| No. | Title | Writer(s) | Producer(s) | Length |
|---|---|---|---|---|
| 1. | "Kings Never Die" (featuring Gwen Stefani) | Marshall Mathers; Luis Resto; Khalil Abdul-Rahman; Erik Alcock; Chin Injeti; Liz Rodrigues | DJ Khalil; Eminem^{[a]}; Gwen Stefani's vocal produced and engineered by Mischke | 4:56 |

Notes

- ^{^[a]} signifies an additional producer.

== Charts ==
Chart performance for "Kings Never Die"
| Chart (2015) | Peak position |
|---|---|
| Australia (ARIA) | 62 |
| Australia Urban Singles (ARIA) | 9 |
| Canada (Canadian Hot 100) | 51 |
| France (SNEP) | 184 |
| Scottish Singles Sales (Official Charts) | 54 |
| South Korean International Downloads (Gaon) | 30 |
| UK Singles (Official Charts) | 82 |
| UK Hip Hop/R&B (Official Charts) | 22 |
| US Billboard Hot 100 | 80 |
| US Hot R&B/Hip-Hop Songs (Billboard) | 23 |
| US Hot Rap Songs (Billboard) | 19 |

== Certifications ==
| Region | Certification | Certified units/sales |
|---|---|---|
| Australia (ARIA) | Gold | 35,000^{‡} |
| Brazil (Pro-Música Brasil) | Gold | 30,000^{‡} |
| New Zealand (RMNZ) | Gold | 15,000^{‡} |
| United Kingdom (BPI) | Silver | 200,000 |
| United States (RIAA) | Gold | 500,000^{‡} |
^{‡} Sales+streaming figures based on certification alone.
