= Til the Casket Drops (Clipse album) =

2009 studio album by Clipse

Studio album by Clipse
- Released: December 8, 2009
- Recorded: 2008–2009
- Genre: Hip-hop
- Length: 51:45
- Labels: Columbia; Sony
- Producers: The Neptunes; Sean C & LV; DJ Khalil; Chin Injeti

Clipse chronology
Hell Hath No Fury (2006)	Til the Casket Drops (2009)	Let God Sort Em Out (2025)

Singles from Til the Casket Drops
- 1. "Kinda Like a Big Deal" Released: April 20, 2009; 2. "I'm Good" Released: June 11, 2009; 3. "All Eyes On Me" Released: August 25, 2009; 4. "Popular Demand (Popeyes)" Released: October 23, 2009

Til the Casket Drops is the third studio album by the American hip-hop duo Clipse, released in the United States on December 8, 2009, by Columbia and Sony. It debuted on number 46 on the Billboard 200, selling 31,000 copies in its very first week of availability. The album received generally positive reviews from critics. It was their final project as Clipse, prior to their split and solo ventures, until Let God Sort Em Out in 2025.

== Overview ==
Following their critically acclaimed Hell Hath No Fury, Clipse left Jive Records. They managed to secure a new deal with Columbia Records, and proceeded to work on their new album. Prior to the release of the album, a mixtape called Road to Till the Casket Drops, was made available on December 1, 2008. They also started their own clothing line named "Play Cloths".

The album was released on December 8, 2009. The album's cover art work was designed by the artist Kaws. Featured guests include Kanye West, Keri Hilson, Pharrell, Cam'ron, Ab-Liva and Yo Gotti. For the first time, Clipse reached out for producers other than The Neptunes. Producers for the album also Sean C and LV, DJ Khalil and Chin Injeti.

This is the final Clipse album, prior to their split in 2010. Pusha T would go on to embark a successful solo career with Kanye West's G.O.O.D. Music, while Malice would go on to convert to Christianity. He would later change his stage name to No Malice, and drop his solo debut Hear Ye Him in 2013.

== Singles ==
A promotional single, "Kinda Like a Big Deal" was released for the album. It features Kanye West. Three official singles were released: "I'm Good" featuring Pharrell of The Neptunes, followed by "All Eyes on Me" featuring Keri Hilson and "Popular Demand (Popeyes)" featuring the New York rapper Cam'ron.

== Critical reception ==
Professional ratings
Aggregate scores
Source	Rating
AnyDecentMusic?	5.7/10
Metacritic	64/100
Review scores
Source	Rating
AllMusic	4/5 stars
The A.V. Club	B
Chicago Tribune	3/4 stars
Entertainment Weekly	A−
Los Angeles Times	3/4 stars
NME	3.5/5 stars
Pitchfork	6.2/10
Spin	3/5 stars
USA Today	3.5/4 stars
XXL	4/5 stars

Til The Casket Drops was met with generally positive reviews. At Metacritic, the album received an average of 64 which indicated "generally favorable reviews".

Andy Kellman of AllMusic noted "There's plenty of dazzling wordplay related to coke dealing and showing off, but the album carries a more redemptive tone and a higher level of self-awareness". Pitchfork editor Ian Cohen gave the album a score of 6.2, stating "Til the Casket Drops awkwardly vacillates between confidence and complacency, between sneering at perceived competition and smarting at perceived and possibly self-made slights". NME editor Emily Mackay criticized the album saying "since their last opus sold so poorly, they are chasing dollar here with a Neptunes assisted move toward big, slick choonage". NME gave the album a score of 3.5 stars out of 5. However, Entertainment Weekly received the album well with a score of A−, saying "Til the Casket Drops might not be quite as spellbinding as their last one, but they're still operating on a level of cleverness that few of their peers can match". Los Angeles Times gave the album a score of 3 stars out of 4. Editor Mikael Wood wrote "On Til the Casket Drops, siblings Gene "Malice" Thornton and Terrence "Pusha T" Thornton resume their collaboration with production juggernaut the Neptunes. But this time, the Virginia duo lower their standards on a handful of songs in pursuit of the hits that eluded them the last time".

Pusha T eventually disowned the album. He later stated in an interview with Elliott Wilson from Tidal in 2021 that "I hate it. I hate it. And when a song comes on, like 'I'm Good,' man, this was a little bit of a bop. Hate it." He also added: "Only thing I love about it is the artwork, and that's because Kaws did it. That's it." Furthermore, in producer Pharrell Williams's 2024 documentary Piece by Piece, he specifically mentioned the single "All Eyes on Me" as the worst song he was ever involved in.

== Commercial performance ==
The album entered the US Billboard 200 chart at number 46, and the Top R&B/Hip-Hop albums at number 9 selling 31,000 copies in its first week. The album sold 62,000 copies within the first month of being released.

== Track listing ==
No.	Title	Writer(s)	Producer(s)	Length
1.	"Freedom"	Terrence Thornton; Gene Thornton; Deleno "Sean C" Matthews; Levar "LV" Coppin; David Potter; Endle St. Cloud	Sean C & LV	3:46
2.	"Popular Demand (Popeyes)" (featuring Cam'ron and Pharrell)	T. Thornton; G. Thornton; Cameron Giles; Pharrell Williams	The Neptunes	4:20
3.	"Kinda Like a Big Deal" (featuring Kanye West)	T. Thornton; G. Thornton; Kanye West; Khalil Abdul-Rahman; Pranam Injeti; Rennard East	DJ Khalil; Chin Injeti	3:26
4.	"Showing Out" (featuring Yo Gotti)	Williams; G. Thornton; T. Thornton; Mario Mims	The Neptunes	3:38
5.	"I'm Good" (featuring Pharrell)	Williams; G. Thornton; T. Thornton	The Neptunes	4:21
6.	"There Was a Murder"	T. Thornton; G. Thornton; Abdul-Rahman; Injeti; Brian Honeycutt	DJ Khalil; Chin Injeti	3:36
7.	"Door Man"	Williams; G. Thornton; T. Thornton	The Neptunes	5:08
8.	"Never Will It Stop" (featuring Ab Liva)	Matthews; Coppin; G. Thornton; T. Thornton; East	Sean C & LV	3:21
9.	"All Eyes on Me" (featuring Keri Hilson)	Williams; G. Thornton; T. Thornton; Keri Hilson	The Neptunes	3:50
10.	"Counseling" (featuring Nicole Hurst)	Williams; G. Thornton; T. Thornton; Nicole Hurst; Giancarlo Bigazzi; Stephen Vincent Piccolo; Raffaele Riefoli	The Neptunes	3:17
11.	"Champion"	Williams; G. Thornton; T. Thornton	The Neptunes	4:14
12.	"Footsteps"	T. Thornton; G. Thornton; Abdul-Rahman; Honeycutt; Khaleef Chiles; Daniel Tannenbaum	DJ Khalil	4:21
13.	"Life Change"	Williams; G. Thornton; T. Thornton; Kenna Zemedkun	The Neptunes	4:27
Total length:				51:45

Sample credits

- "Freedom" contains excerpts from "Open Letter", written by David Potter and Endle St. Cloud, as performed by Potter-St. Cloud.
- "Counseling" contains interpolations from "Self Control", written by Giancarlo Bigazzi, Stephen Vincent Piccolo, and Raffaele Riefoli.

== Charts ==
=== Weekly charts ===
Chart (2009)	Peak position
US Billboard 200	46
US Top R&B/Hip-Hop Albums (Billboard)	9

=== Year-end charts ===
Chart (2010)	Position
US Top R&B/Hip-Hop Albums	70
