= Roger Mooking =

Trinidadian-Canadian chef, musician and television host

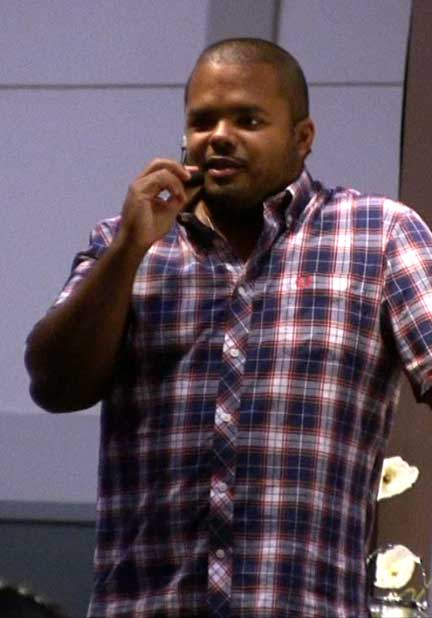
- Mooking speaks at a demonstration at the CNE.
- Born: Trinidad and Tobago
- Education: George Brown Culinary Management Program
- Height: 1.67 m (5 ft 6 in)
- Culinary career
- Cooking style: Global and BBQ
- Current restaurants
- Twist by Roger Mooking, Previously executive chef at Kultura Social Dining and Nyood Restaurant
- Television shows
- Everyday Exotic, Heat Seekers, Man Fire Food, Chopped: Canada

Roger Mooking is a Trinidadian-Canadian chef, musician, and television host. Mooking is the host of the television series Man Fire Food (2012 to 2020). He is also the host and co-creator of Everyday Exotic. Both programs aired on the Cooking Channel and Food Network Canada. He also appears on Heat Seekers with Aarón Sanchez on Food Network. Mooking has had many appearances on shows such as Today, Good Morning America, The Marilyn Denis Show, Iron Chef America, Top Chef Canada, and Chopped Canada.

== Early life ==
Mooking was born in Trinidad and Tobago into an extended family made up of food and beverage business providers. He moved to Canada at the age of five, and grew up in Edmonton, Alberta, where his parents were in the restaurant business. He is of mixed African-Trinidadian, Dutch, British, and Chinese heritage. Mooking was introduced to European flavours by his mother, who prepared dishes from recipes passed on by her Ukrainian neighbours.

== Career ==
=== Musical career ===
Under the stage name MC Mystic, Mooking spent the early 1990s as a member of the Edmonton-based hip hop group The Maximum Definitive, who received a Juno Award nomination in 1993 for their single "Jungle Man". The group then moved to Toronto to continue their musical careers, but broke up due to creative differences before they could actually complete recording a full album, and Mooking went on to join the soul/R&B trio Bass Is Base.

Bass Is Base consisted of Chin Injeti on bass, Ivana Santilli on keyboards and trumpet, and MC Mystic (Roger Mooking) on percussion. All three members contributed vocals, Injeti and Santilli as singers and Mystic as a rapper. In addition to the early single "Funk-mobile", which garnered the band a deal with A&M Records, its debut album, First Impressions for the Bottom Jigglers, won a Juno Award in the Best R&B/Soul Recording category in 1995. A year later, the second consequential album, Memories of the Soul Shack Survivors, gave the band its first Top 20 hit, “I Cry.”

Mooking has since released two solo albums, Soul Food in 2008 and Feedback in 2013.

=== Chef ===
Mooking studied culinary arts at George Brown College, and still continues to operate as the chair of the professional advisory committee. Mooking worked at Toronto's Royal York Hotel before co-owning and consulting on many food and beverage operations in Ontario.

During his years as a restaurateur, Mooking was the executive chef and co-owner of Kultura Social Dining and Nyood Restaurant.

Currently he is the executive chef at Twist by Roger Mooking, located in Terminal 1 at Toronto Pearson International Airport. Mooking claims that Twist is his favorite of his restaurants and is home to his favorite recipe - Egg and Nori.

=== Television appearances ===
Mooking is the host of several television shows, including Heat Seekers and Man Fire Food. He is also the co-creator and host of Everyday Exotic, a television show in which he features spices and other flavourful ingredients from around the globe and shows viewers how to use them in everyday cooking. As the host of Man Fire Food on Cooking Channel, Mooking travels around the U.S. exploring different ways to cook with fire and smoke, from small campfires to creative custom-made grills and smokers. Man Fire Food is in its eighth season. Mooking served as a recurring judge on Food Network's Chopped Canada. He served as a judge on two episodes of season 10 Guy's Grocery Games.

Mooking has also been the subject of an hour-long biography titled Chefography for Cooking Channel. He also made a guest star in an episode of "This is Scarlett & Isaiah" in the episode, "This is Isaiah making wontons" in 2013.

Mooking has appeared on The Today Show, Good Morning America, Iron Chef America, Top Chef Canada, The Marilyn Denis Show, Wendy Williams, Martha Stewart Radio, Unique Eats, and Steven and Chris. Mooking has also made regular appearances at various food and wine festivals, including New York Food and Wine Festival, South Beach Food and Wine Festival, Gourmet Escape and The Essence Music Festival.

He appeared in the 2021 edition of Canada Reads, advocating for Francesca Ekwuyasi's novel Butter Honey Pig Bread.

In June of 2025, he launched "podcasty cooking-show" Breaking Bread with Roger Mooking on Amazon Prime.

=== Author ===
Mooking's cookbook, "Everyday Exotic: The Cookbook", was published 2011, and won a Gourmand World Cookbook award. The book explains how to add unconventional ingredients to traditional dishes to experience the flavors developed by cultures from Asia to the Middle East, Europe, the Caribbean, and the Americas.

=== Filmography ===
Television
Year	Title	Role	Notes
2008–2009	Everyday Exotic	Himself/host	
2012–present	Man Fire Food	Himself/host	
2014–2017	Chopped Canada	Himself	Recurring judge
2015	Chopped	Himself	Judge; Season 24 episode 9 and 11: "College Challenge" and "Tailgate Fate"; Contestant; Season 24 episode 13: "Holiday Cooking"
2016	Guy's Grocery Games	Himself	Judge; Season 10 episode 1 and 7: "Guy's Summer Games" and "Spice Masters"

== Charitable work ==
In 2011, Mooking partnered up with World Vision Canada and made a trip to Cambodia to exchange information and ideas about child nutrition, and to bring awareness to the issues of healthy food and clean water for families in all countries.

In fall 2012, Mooking traveled to Bangladesh to visit nutrition-related programming run by Save the Children and to meet with community groups, medical clinics, and local families and explore ways to create sustainable health and nutrition programs so that successful concepts can be applied worldwide. He has continued to work with Save The Children and their programming and has since traveled to Peru as well as worked with the organization locally.

Mooking is also committed to Toronto-based charity Second Harvest, co-hosting its annual charity Toronto Taste, for providing rescued food to families in need.

== Personal life ==
Mooking is married and has four daughters. He has claimed to have "never [cooked] the same thing twice."

He lists Martha Stewart, Mike Tyson and Bruce Lee as some of his influences. Bruce Lee because of his dedication and discipline and the common ground he shares with him as an immigrant who broke down barriers, Mike Tyson for his drive to never give up and ability transform and evolve significantly in one lifetime and Martha Stewart for he dedication to sharing excellence, her steadfastness and her meticulousness.
