= MuchMusic Video Award for Best R&B Video =

List of MuchMusic Video Awards winners

The following is a list of the MuchMusic Video Awards winners for Best R&B Video or Best Soul/R&B Video. This award is now defunct, and has not been awarded since 2004.

Year	Artist	Video
1990	Devon	"Mr. Metro"
1991	Errol Blackwood	"Arrested"
1992	B-Funn	"Wondering Where The Lions Are"
1993	John James	"Supernatural"
1994	Bass is Base	"Funkmobile"
1995	Philosopher Kings	"Charms"
1996	Bass is Base	"Diamond Dreams"
1997	Carlos Morgan	"Give It To You"
1998	Kaybe	"Natural High"
1999	2 Rude f. Latoya, Miranda	"Thinkin About You"
2000	2 Rude f. Jully Black, Mag-T, Macallee King, former members of Grimmi Grimmi	"Dissin' Us"
2004	In Essence	"Friend Of Mine"
