= I'm Good (Clipse song) =

Single by Clipse featuring Pharrell

from the album Til the Casket Drops
- Released: June 30, 2009
- Recorded: 2009
- Genre: Hip-hop
- Length: 4:02 (Radio & Video Version); 4:22 (Album & Single Version); 4:35 (Remix Version)
- Label: Star Trak; Re-Up; Columbia
- Songwriters: Gene Thornton; Terrence Thornton; Pharrell Williams
- Producer: The Neptunes

Clipse singles chronology
"Kinda Like a Big Deal" (2008)	"I'm Good" (2009)	"All Eyes On Me" (2009)

Pharrell singles chronology
"Blanco" (2009)	"I'm Good" (2009)	"All Eyes On Me" (2009)

"I'm Good" is a song by American hip-hop duo Clipse featuring Pharrell Williams from the duo's third studio album Til the Casket Drops (2009). Produced by The Neptunes (Williams and Chad Hugo), the cover artwork is made by KAWS who also made the cover artwork for Clipse's previous single "Kinda Like a Big Deal". It was released on iTunes on June 30, 2009. The single sold nearly 7,700 copies in first week.

== Music video ==
The music videos for "I'm Good" (directed by Dayo) as well as "All Eyes On Me" featuring Keri Hilson were shot in late June 2009 in Los Angeles. It ranked at #27 on BET's Notarized Top 100 Videos of 2009 countdown.

== Remix ==
The official remix has new verses by Clipse and features rappers Rick Ross and Pharrell Williams. It was released on the internet and New York radio station Hot 97 by DJ Envy on October 19, 2009. The music video of the remix was released on November 3, 2009. The remix originally leaked on the internet and mixtapes on October 12, 2009, with Clipse's verses from the original version and Ross' verse for the remix.

== Charts ==
Chart (2009)	Peak position
US Hot R&B/Hip-Hop Songs (Billboard)	27
US Hot Rap Songs (Billboard)	14
