= Man Fire Food =

American food reality television series

- Genre: Food reality television; Travel documentary
- Created by: Irene Wong
- Directed by: Irene Wong; Jenny Kirsten; Emily Benson
- Starring: Roger Mooking
- Country of origin: United States
- Original language: English
- No. of seasons: 6
- No. of episodes: 88

Production
- Executive producer: Irene Wong
- Producer: IW Productions
- Running time: 22:00

Original release
- Network: Cooking Channel
- Release: September 28, 2012 – June 24, 2020

Man Fire Food was an American food travelogue television series that airs on Cooking Channel. It is presented by chef Roger Mooking. The series features Mooking traveling to different cities and learning unique methods of barbecuing.

Man Fire Food officially premiered on September 28, 2012.

On April 29, 2020, it was announced that the ninth season will premiere on May 20, 2020.

== Episodes ==
=== Season 1 ===
No.	Title	Original air date	Production code
1	"Feast Over Flame"	September 18, 2012	TBA
2	"Fire Trucks"	September 25, 2012	TBA
3	"Fired-Up Chefs"	September 25, 2012	TBA
4	"Cowboy Cooking"	October 9, 2012	TBA
5	"Pit Masters"	October 9, 2012	TBA
6	"Monster Rigs"	November 6, 2012	TBA
7	"Seafood Feast" (Note: "Seafood Feast" was produced as the ninth episode of the first season, but it aired as the seventh episode of the season.)	November 20, 2012	TBA
8	"Coast to Coast Cookout" (Note: "Coast to Coast Cookout" was produced as the seventh episode of the first season, but it aired as the eighth episode of the season.)	November 6, 2012	TBA
9	"Backyard Feast" (Note: "Backyard Feast" was produced as the eighth episode of the first season, but it aired as the ninth episode of the season.)	December 11, 2012	TBA
10	"Outrageous Ovens"	December 18, 2012	TBA

=== Season 2 ===
No.	Title	Original air date	Production code
1	"Smoke and Steam" (Note: "Smoke and Steam" was produced as the second episode of the second season, but it aired as the first episode of the season.)	June 3, 2013	TBA
2	"South Carolina Surf and Turf" (Note: "South Carolina Surf and Turf" was produced as the third episode of the second season, but it aired as the second episode of the season.)	June 10, 2013	TBA
3	"Feasts Over Fire in Hawaii" (Note: "Feasts Over Fire in Hawaii" was produced as the first episode of the second season, but it aired as the third episode of the season.)	June 17, 2013	TBA
4	"Mediterranean Seafood Fests" (Note: "Mediterranean Seafood Fests" was produced as the fifth episode of the second season, but it aired as the fourth episode of the season.)	June 24, 2013	TBA
5	"South American Grilling" (Note: "South American Grilling" was produced as the fifth episode of the second season, but it aired as the fourth episode of the season.)	June 24, 2013	TBA
6	"Pig Roasts" (Note: "Pig Roasts" was produced as the fourth episode of the second season, but it aired as the sixth episode of the season.)	July 9, 2013	TBA
7	"Texas BBQ"	July 16, 2013	TBA
8	"Roasting and Ranching in Texas"	July 30, 2013	TBA
9	"Cajun Cookouts"	August 6, 2013	TBA
10	"Crazy for Chicken"	August 13, 2013	TBA
11	"Food Traditions"	August 27, 2013	TBA
12	"Love for Lobsters in Maine"	September 3, 2013	TBA
13	"Fiery Foods in Jamaica"	September 10, 2013	TBA

=== Season 3 ===
No.	Title	Original air date	Production code
1	"BBQ Sandwiches"	June 3, 2014	TBA
2	"Fiery Mexican Feast" (Note: "Fiery Mexican Feast" was produced as the fourth episode of the third season, but it aired as the second episode of the season.)	June 10, 2014	TBA
3	"Small Packages, Big Flavors" (Note: "Small Packages, Big Flavors" was produced as the sixth episode of the third season, but it aired as the third episode of the season.)	June 17, 2014	TBA
4	"Carolina Çue" (Note: "Carolina Cue" was produced as the third episode of the third season, but it aired as the fourth episode of the season.)	June 24, 2014	TBA
5	"Global Flavors of Texas"	July 1, 2014	TBA
6	"Hamming It Up" (Note: "Hamming it Up" was produced as the second episode of the third season, but it aired as the sixth episode of the season.)	July 8, 2014	TBA
7	"Mud and Steel in New Mexico"	July 15, 2014	TBA
8	"Carnivore's Cookout in CA"	July 22, 2014	TBA
9	"West Coast Roasts"	July 29, 2014	TBA
10	"Wilderness Cooking"	August 5, 2014	TBA
11	"Fireplace Feast"	August 12, 2014	TBA
12	"Playing with Fire"	August 19, 2014	TBA
13	"Spring Celebration in Kentucky"	August 26, 2014	TBA

=== Season 4 ===
No.	Title	Original air date	Production code
1	"Pigging Out on Pork"	July 14, 2015	TBA
2	"Alabama BBQ"	July 21, 2015	TBA
3	"Low Country Cookouts"	July 28, 2015	TBA
4	"Lone Star Load-Up"	August 4, 2015	TBA
5	"Meat on a Stick"	August 11, 2015	TBA
6	"Rib-A-Licious"	August 18, 2015	TBA
7	"Backyard Blowouts"	August 25, 2015	TBA
8	"Light It Up!"	September 1, 2015	TBA
9	"Holy Smokes!" (Note: "Holy Smokes!" was produced as the tenth episode of the fourth season and "Wine Country Cookouts" was produced as the ninth episode of the season, but the episodes aired in reverse order.)	September 8, 2015	TBA
10	"Wine Country Cookouts"	September 15, 2015	TBA
11	"Three-Alarm Fire"	September 22, 2015	TBA
12	"Grillin' and Smokin'"	September 29, 2015	TBA
13	"Puerto Rican Grilling"	October 6, 2015	TBA

=== Season 5 ===
No.	Title	Original air date	Production code
1	"Too Hot to Handle" (Note: "Too Hot to Handle" was produced as the third episode of the fifth season, but it aired as the first episode of the season.)	July 5, 2016	TBA
2	"Florida Fixins"	July 12, 2016	TBA
3	"Queens of 'Cue" (Note: "Queens of 'Cue" was produced as the sixth episode of the fifth season, but it aired as the third episode of the season.)	July 19, 2016	TBA
4	"Swords and Spits" (Note: "Swords and Spits" was produced as the fifth episode of the fifth season and "Hog Heaven" was produced as the fourth episode of the season, but the episodes aired in reverse order.)	July 26, 2016	TBA
5	"Hog Heaven"	August 2, 2016	TBA
6	"Fireside Hangs" (Note: "Fireside Hangs" was produced as the first episode of the fifth season, but it aired as the ninth episode of the season.)	August 9, 2016	TBA
7	"Fiery Fish and Fowl"	August 16, 2016	TBA
8	"All You Can Feast"	August 23, 2016	TBA
9	"The Salt and the Sea"	August 30, 2016	TBA
10	"Meat Me in Texas"	September 6, 2016	TBA
11	"One-of-a-Kind Rigs"	September 13, 2016	TBA
12	"Sizzling Steaks"	September 20, 2016	TBA
13	"Meat Fest in the Midwest"	September 27, 2016	TBA

=== Season 6 ===
No.	Title	Original air date	Production code
1	"Old School, New School"	May 30, 2017	TBA
2	"Swine Dining"	June 6, 2017	TBA
3	"Generations of Smoke"	June 13, 2017	TBA
4	"Out of This World BBQ"	June 20, 2017	TBA
5	"Fueling the Fires in Texas"	June 27, 2017	TBA
6	"Where There's Smoke"	July 4, 2017	TBA
7	"Monster Meat"	July 11, 2017	TBA
8	"Meaty Marvels"	July 18, 2017	TBA
9	"Meat in Music City"	July 25, 2017	TBA
10	"Revolutionary Roasts"	August 1, 2017	TBA
11	"Heavy Metal Meat"	August 13, 2017	TBA
12	"Crazy Contraptions"	August 20, 2017	TBA
13	"Heating It Up in Hawaii"	August 27, 2017	TBA
14	"Fire Festivals"	January 3, 2018	TBA
15	"Top 5 BBQ Chicken"	January 10, 2018	TBA
16	"Whole Animals"	January 17, 2018	TBA
17	"Fishing for Fire"	January 24, 2018	TBA
18	"Women Fire Food"	January 31, 2018	TBA
19	"Meat Mania"	February 7, 2018	TBA
20	"Pig Out"	February 14, 2018	TBA
21	"Surf and Turf"	February 21, 2018	TBA
22	"Smokin' Sides and Sweets"	February 28, 2018	TBA
23	"Top 5 BBQ Between Bread"	March 7, 2018	TBA
24	"Insane Inventions"	March 14, 2018	TBA
25	"Pit Bosses"	March 21, 2018	TBA
26	"Smoked Out"	March 28, 2018	TBA
