= Boost (material) =

Trademarked polymer

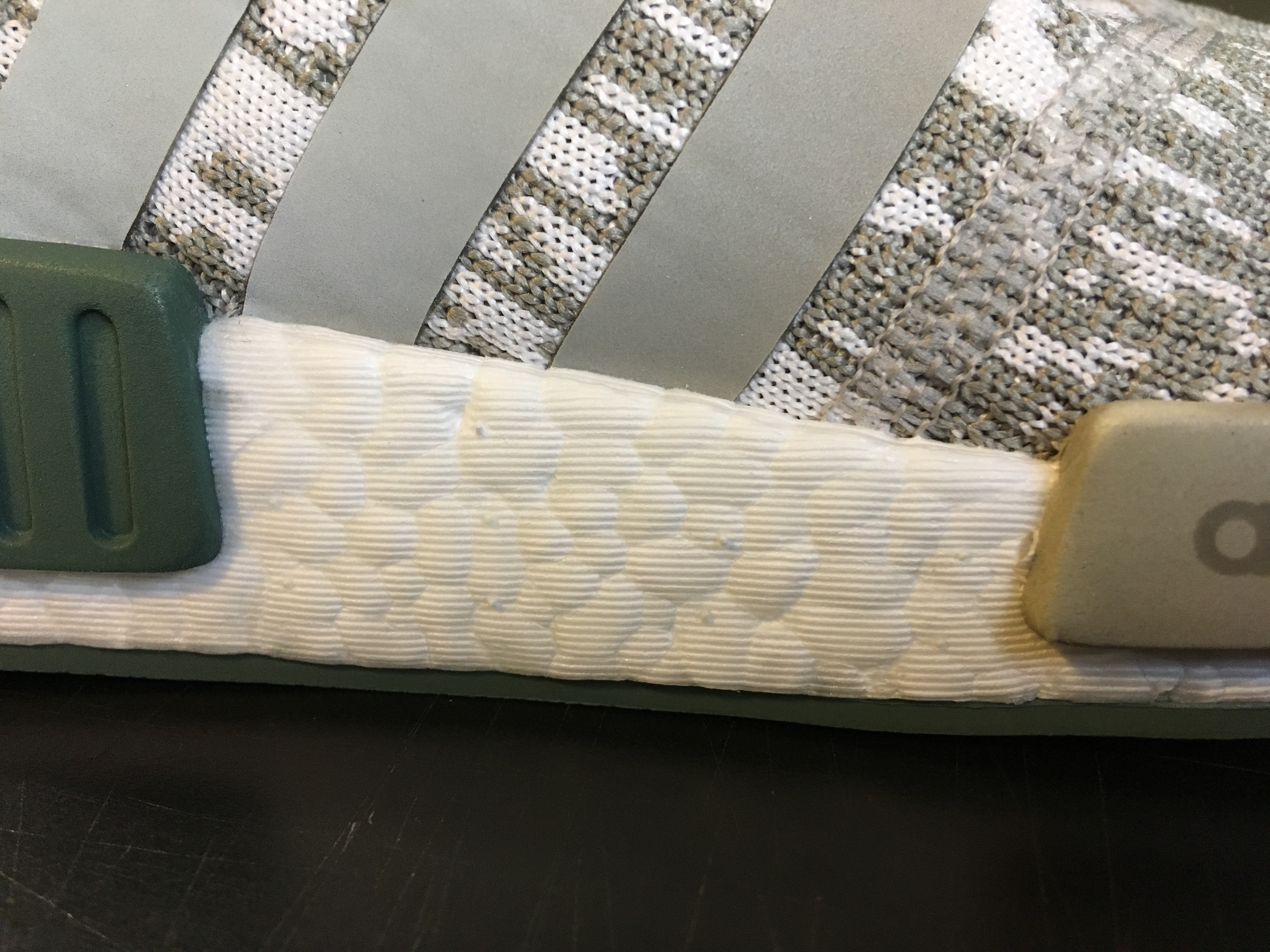
Adidas Boost (white) depicted in the midsole of Adidas NMD_R1 shoes

Boost is a trademarked polymer used by Adidas, in the form of pellets which are compressed and molded for various shoe models the company sells, especially the Ultraboost, NMD, Energy Boost, Pure Boost, and Adizero Adios Boost lines of sneakers. The pellets consist of proprietary thermoplastic polyurethane (TPU) that is formed into a small pill shape. Adidas collaborated with the German chemical company BASF to develop this material. Boost in itself is not a raw material and its characteristic bounciness is obtained by processing the TPU. This material is claimed to be more comfortable on the wearer's feet.

== History ==
Prior to its first integration into the Adidas running line in 2013, this material was developed by BASF chemists. BASF sold its product to Adidas who integrated it into the midsoles of certain lines of their shoes. This material, commonly known as "BOOST", is Adidas's preferred alternative to other industry standards such as ethylene-vinyl acetate (EVA).
