= Survival (Eminem song) =

2013 single by Eminem

Single by Eminem

from the album The Marshall Mathers LP 2
- Released: October 8, 2013
- Recorded: 2011–2013
- Genre: Rap rock
- Length: 4:34
- Label: Shady; Aftermath; Interscope
- Songwriters: Marshall Mathers; Liz Rodrigues; Khalil Abdul-Rahman; Mike Strange; Pranam Injeti; Erik Alcock
- Producer: DJ Khalil

Eminem singles chronology
"Berzerk" (2013)	"Survival" (2013)	"Rap God" (2013)

Music video
- "Survival" on YouTube

"Survival" is a song by American rapper Eminem. It premiered on August 14, 2013, to promote the multiplayer trailer for the video game Call of Duty: Ghosts, and was initially released as a pre-order bonus when pre-ordering the game. The song was officially released as the second single from The Marshall Mathers LP 2 on October 8, 2013. It features uncredited vocals in the chorus from Liz Rodrigues of the New Royales. Upon its single release, the song debuted at number 17 on the US Billboard Hot 100, and upon the album's release, it climbed to a new peak of number 16.

== Release ==
In August 2013, following the release of Call of Duty: Ghosts multiplayer video, Eminem released a video explaining to his fans the new album would be released in the fall, and that a new music video was coming soon. It was also confirmed that the song would be featured within the game. This was the third time that an Eminem song was used to promote a Call of Duty (CoD) game, with "'Till I Collapse" being used in the CoD: Modern Warfare 2 trailer, and "Won't Back Down" being used in the CoD: Black Ops trailer, in zombies mode as a hidden song and the end credits. The song is also featured on the soundtrack of WWE 2K19, being selected by AJ Styles to be included in the soundtrack.

The song is also heard in the end credits for Ghosts.

== Music video ==
The official music video for "Survival" was released on October 8, 2013. The music video featured Eminem rapping in front of footage of CoD: Ghosts featured on a projector, with additional shots featuring elements from the game such as dogs and soldiers in their in-game outfits. The final scene features Eminem revisiting the house featured on the cover of The Marshall Mathers LP and The Marshall Mathers LP 2. The house was later demolished by the state of Michigan.

== Live performances ==
Eminem performed the song on Saturday Night Live on November 2, 2013, along with "Berzerk", with Skylar Grey replacing Liz Rodrigues on backing vocals. He also performed the song on BBC Radio 1 in November 2013, along with "Stan" and "Not Afraid".

== Critical reception ==
The song features rock guitars in a style that makes it similar to works from Eminem's Recovery, according to Luke Bainbridge of The Guardian. Los Angeles Times pop music critic Randall Roberts says that the song matches the "voluminous, venom-filled and explosive" levels of the work it accompanies. Roberts says the song features an aggressive rapper, "cuss-filled lines...the bombast of distorted electric guitar and a jumbo beat." He says that the DJ Khalil-produced song, which features the New Royales' Liz Rodrigues, "is a cliché-ridden couplet that sounds like it took as much time to imagine as it did to scribble on a scrap of paper." Rolling Stone's Ryan Reed describes the song as hard-hitting with background music that classifies as "breakneck, arena-rock guitars and trashy drums."

== Awards and nominations ==
Year	Ceremony	Award	Result
2013	Spike Video Game Awards	Best Song In A Game	Nominated

== Track listing ==
Digital Download

No.	Title	Writer(s)	Producer(s)	Length
1.	"Survival"	Marshall Mathers; Liz Rodrigues; Khalil Abdul-Rahman; Mike Strange; Pranam Injeti; Erik Alcock	DJ Khalil	4:34

== Chart performance ==
=== Weekly charts ===
Chart (2013)	Peak position
Australia (ARIA)	18
Austria (Ö3 Austria Top 40)	29
Belgium (Ultratop 50 Flanders)	49
Belgium (Ultratop 50 Wallonia)	44
Belgium Urban (Ultratop)	15
Brazil (ABPD)	49
Canada Hot 100 (Billboard)	6
Denmark (Tracklisten)	27
France (SNEP)	19
Germany (GfK)	20
Hungary (Single Top 40)	15
Ireland (IRMA)	22
Italy (FIMI)	49
Netherlands (Single Top 100)	49
New Zealand (Recorded Music NZ)	13
Scottish Singles Sales (Official Charts)	14
Sweden (Sverigetopplistan)	26
Switzerland (Schweizer Hitparade)	13
UK Singles (Official Charts)	22
UK Hip Hop/R&B (Official Charts)	4
US Billboard Hot 100	16
US Hot R&B/Hip-Hop Songs (Billboard)	6

=== Year-end charts ===
Chart (2013)	Position
France (SNEP)	174
US Hot R&B/Hip-Hop Songs (Billboard)	80
Chart (2014)	Position
US Hot R&B/Hip-Hop Songs (Billboard)	84

== Certifications ==
Region	Certification	Certified units/sales
Australia (ARIA)	Platinum	70,000^{‡}
Germany (BVMI)	Gold	150,000^{‡}
New Zealand (RMNZ)	Gold	7,500^{*}
Sweden (GLF)	Gold	20,000^{‡}
United Kingdom (BPI)	Gold	400,000^{‡}
United States (RIAA)	2× Platinum	2,000,000^{‡}
^{*} Sales figures based on certification alone.^{‡} Sales+streaming figures based on certification alone.

== Release history ==
Country	Date	Format	Label
United States	October 8, 2013	Digital download	Shady, Aftermath, Interscope
