= Heat Seekers =

- Genre: Reality
- Presented by: Aarón Sanchez; Roger Mooking
- Country of origin: United States
- Original language: English
- No. of seasons: 2
- No. of episodes: 16

Original release
- Network: Food Network
- Release: July 17, 2011 – March 5, 2012

Heat Seekers is an American reality television series on the Food Network. The series officially debuted on July 22, 2011, but one episode aired prior on July 17, 2011. The second season of the series premiered on January 16, 2012.

== Premise ==
The series follows chefs Aarón Sanchez and Roger Mooking as they work to discover and taste some of the spiciest food across the United States.

== Episodes ==
=== Season 1: 2011 ===
No. in season	Title	Original release date
1	"New Orleans"	July 17, 2011
2	"Chicago"	July 22, 2011
3	"Seattle"	July 29, 2011
4	"Santa Fe"	August 5, 2011
5	"Miami"	August 12, 2011
6	"Charleston"	August 26, 2011
7	"Philadelphia"	September 2, 2011
8	"Los Angeles"	September 9, 2011

=== Season 2: 2012 ===
No. in season	Title	Original release date
1	"Dallas"	January 16, 2012
2	"Las Vegas"	January 23, 2012
3	"San Diego"	January 30, 2012
4	"Nashville"	February 6, 2012
5	"Tampa Bay"	February 13, 2012
6	"Kansas City"	February 20, 2012
7	"Washington, D.C."	February 27, 2012
8	"Atlanta"	March 5, 2012
