= The Maximum Definitive =

Canadian hip hop trio

- Origin: Edmonton, Alberta, Canada
- Genres: Hip hop music
- Years active: 1990-1993
- Members: Justin "Darp Malone" Ryan; David "Click" Cox; Roger "Mystic" Mooking

The Maximum Definitive was a Canadian hip hop trio, active in the early 1990s. They are noted for their single "Jungle Man", which was a Juno Award nominee for Best Rap Recording in 1993.

Originally from Edmonton, Alberta, the group was formed in high school in the late 1980s, when Justin "Darp Malone" Ryan saw David "Click" Cox win a dance battle. Darp had been performing and (dance) battling with Jerome Lewis; Click joined them and they added two more dancers, a DJ and a female vocalist. The name was chosen from a thesaurus, mainly because "TMD" is an effective acronym. The band was then joined by Roger "Mystic" Mooking, however Mooking and Lewis did not get along and Lewis left the band. The group began performing in Edmonton and touring Western Canada as an opening act for Ice-T and Will "Fresh Prince" Smith; the band dwindled to the three members.

After performing at an Edmonton fashion show, the trio was approached by filmmaker Jordan Kryzanowski to film videos for some of their songs. "Jungle Man" attracted the attention of MuchMusic VJ Master T. The video, inspired by the X Clan and Brand Nubian, has a tribal theme and was filmed at Edmonton's Muttart Conservatory. Jerome's Lewis' baby daughter, Quanteisha, who became a Juno award winning vocalist, was featured in the video. After making it into rotation on MuchMusic, the song earned the band their Juno Award nomination, as well as the MuchMusic Video Award for Best Rap Video in 1993. Mooking and Ryan were under 20; Cox was still in high school.

The band was planning to record their debut album when Mooking, now living in Toronto, co-founded the band Bass Is Base. Cox and Ryan discovered this only when they saw Mooking on the cover on the latter's debut album First Impressions for the Bottom Jigglers. Production on the TMD album ceased and the band dissolved.

Cox went on to work in A&R (artists and repertoire) for BMG Rights Management and Universal Music Canada; he also founded the Stylus Awards, which recognizes DJs, hip hop artists, producers and Canadian club culture. With the rapper E-Dot (Errol Henry), Ryan recorded the 2008 album E-Dot & Darpmalone Are... Hero. Mooking became a restaurateur and celebrity chef.
