= Chin Injeti =

Canadian musician (born 1973)

- Also known as: CHIN
- Born: Pranam Injeti; April 9, 1973 (age 52); India
- Genres: Hip hop; pop; R&B; folk
- Occupations: Producer; musician; songwriter; singer; A&R
- Instruments: Bass guitar; piano; keyboards; guitar
- Years active: 1990–present
- Label: Sparks Music
- Member of: The New Royales
- Formerly of: Bass is Base
- Website: chininjeti.com

Pranam "Chin" Injeti (born April 9, 1973 in India) is an Indian-Canadian singer, musician and music producer. He got his start as a founding member of Juno Award-winning group Bass is Base. He frequently collaborates with producer DJ Khalil; together they have written and produced songs for Dr. Dre, 50 Cent, Drake, Clipse, Eminem and Pink, as well as being members of the group The New Royales since 2008, which also includes Liz Rodrigues and Erik Alcock. Injeti's work with Eminem and Lecrae has garnered 3 Grammy Awards, as well as Grammy nominations for Aloe Blacc's Lift Your Spirit and Pink's The Truth About Love.

== Solo career ==
In 1993, while students at the University of Toronto, Injeti, Roger Mooking and Ivana Santilli formed the group Bass is Base. They independently released First Impressions for the Bottom Jigglers, which went on to sell 30,000 copies and garner them a Juno Award for Best R&B/Soul Recording in 1994. Their first single, Funkmobile, was an underground hit, eventually receiving heavy rotation on Much Music. This led to opening performance spots for Jamiroquai, Pharcyde, Rheostatics, Crash Test Dummies, Barenaked Ladies and Meshell Ndegeocello.

After the success of Funkmobile the band was signed to A&M Records, and released their second album Memories of the Soulshack Survivors in 1995.

In 1996, the band had their first breakout top 40 hit, "I Cry", which would enter the top 20 on the Pop and Adult Contemporary charts in Canada. Following the release of their second album, the band toured until 1997, opening for groups such as Cypress Hill, Busta Rhymes, TLC and James Brown. Despite their rapid rise to success and signing a major label record deal, the band members decided that their original intentions for creating the group had been forgotten, and disbanded to pursue other interests.

In 2001, Injeti released his debut solo album Daydreaming. The album was co-produced by David Kershaw and fused a variety of styles, including acoustic grooves, b-boy rap, fusion jazz and mainstream pop.

After focusing work with other artists and starting the group The New Royales, Chin released his second solo album, D'tach, in 2010. The album featured minimal production, combining influences in to a sound Injeti dubbed "Urban-Folk". He released a companion EP in 2011 entitled Re'tach, which featured different producers remixing tracks from D'tach.

Injeti's latest release The Reverb was released in 2014, and includes appearances by David Banner, Sophia Danai, and The New Royales' Erik Alcock and Liz Rodrigues.

== Songwriting and production ==
Injeti's production career began with Bass is Base's debut album First Impressions for the Bottom Jigglers. He went on to produce Ridley Bent's debut album, Blam!, developing a sound described as "Hick-Hop". He continued working with other artists, including Esthero, Kinnie Starr, Bedouin Soundclash, The Canadian Tenors and Mad Child, and composed "Ansomnia" with Zaki Ibrahim for the soundtrack for Tyler Perry's film For Colored Girls.

In 2008, Injeti began collaborating with multi-platinum, Grammy Award-winning producer DJ Khalil. Together they have written and produced a number of commercially successful records, including "Fear" from Drake's So Far Gone, 50 Cent's "Could've Been You" (featuring R. Kelly) from Before I Self Destruct, Clipse's "Kinda Like A Big Deal" (featuring Kanye West) from Til the Casket Drops, as well as "Can You Do This" from Aloe Blacc's Grammy-nominated album Lift Your Spirit.

Along with DJ Khalil, Erik Alcock and Liz Rodrigues, Injeti formed the production team known as The New Royales. The group has worked with a number of major artists, including writing and producing tracks for Eminem on Recovery, The Marshall Mathers LP 2, and the Southpaw soundtrack, and for Pink on the Grammy-nominated album The Truth About Love.

Injeti's work has won 3 Grammy Awards: Best Rap Album for Eminem's Recovery and The Marshall Mathers LP 2, and Best Gospel Album for Lecrae's Gravity.
