= Phenomenal (song) =

Single by Eminem

from the album Southpaw (Music from and Inspired By the Motion Picture)
- Released: June 2, 2015
- Recorded: 2015
- Genre: Hip-hop
- Length: 4:43
- Label: Shady; Interscope
- Songwriters: Marshall Mathers; Luis Resto; Mario Resto
- Producer: DJ Khalil

Eminem singles chronology
"Best Friend" (2015)	"Phenomenal" (2015)	"Kings Never Die" (2015)

"Phenomenal" is a single by American hip-hop artist and record producer Eminem, from the soundtrack album Southpaw (Music from and Inspired By the Motion Picture), released on June 2, 2015. Eminem also released a song called "Kings Never Die" which is also on the Southpaw soundtrack.

== Background ==
To promote the single's release, it previewed in trailers for the film Southpaw, starring Jake Gyllenhaal. In the ending of the video, Eminem shouts, 'I am Phenomenal'. This informed people that the new Eminem song was titled "Phenomenal". After that, Beats Electronics used a longer snippet of the song for a new commercial of Beats Solo HD2 with Draymond Green. On June 1, Eminem released another longer snippet of 15 seconds. On June 2, the audio was released on EminemMusic. The song was written by Eminem, Luis Resto and Mario Resto. It also contains vocals by Liz Rodriguez and Mario Resto. The single was produced by DJ Khalil.

== Music video ==
Eminem posted a video on YouTube as a sneak peek for the upcoming music video. The video premiered on July 3, via Apple Music. Filmed at Universal Studios in California and directed by Rich Lee, the video features Eminem as a person with superhuman abilities although suffering from memory loss. He gets out from the hospital by knocking out some security guards and comes out on the streets. He finds a stranger (John Malkovich) on a rickshaw who seems to applaud his abilities. He tells Eminem to come with him and 'finish what we started' to which Eminem asks that he should tell him who he is and what will happen should he not follow him, to which the stranger replies, "You will fall". Unconcerned, Eminem takes a bike and accidentally jumps into a car with an anonymous person (Randall Park) inside. He orders him to get out of his car after the person requests him to take a selfie with him. The chase ends when Eminem falls at the ground floor of a building which seems to be a stage having Dr. Dre standing at the corner saying, "Right on time". Eminem is then shown to grab a mic and standing facing the lights till the camera shuts off. The video was later released on October 1, 2015 via Vevo. On November 4, 2015, a video showing the making of the music video was released.

== Commercial performance ==
"Phenomenal" entered the Billboard Hot 100 at number 47 as the week's highest-ranking debut, powered by first-week digital download sales of 77,000 copies. The song peaked at number 9 at the Billboard Hot Rap Songs chart.

== Charts ==
=== Weekly charts ===
Chart (2015)	Peak position
Australia (ARIA)	81
Canada Hot 100 (Billboard)	61
UK Singles (Official Charts)	57
UK Singles Downloads (Official Charts)	33
UK Hip Hop/R&B (Official Charts)	13
US Billboard Hot 100	47
US Hot R&B/Hip-Hop Songs (Billboard)	14

== Certifications ==
Region	Certification	Certified units/sales
Australia (ARIA)	Gold	35,000^{‡}
Brazil (Pro-Música Brasil)	Gold	30,000^{‡}
United States (RIAA)	Gold	500,000^{‡}
^{‡} Sales+streaming figures based on certification alone.
