= Everyday Exotic =

- Genre: Cooking show
- Created by: Roger Mooking
- Presented by: Roger Mooking
- Country of origin: Canada
- Original language: English
- No. of seasons: 2

Production
- Running time: 30 minutes (including commercials)
- Production companies: Magee TV; Sky High Entertainment

Original release
- Network: Food Network Canada

Everyday Exotic is a Canadian instructional cooking series starring Roger Mooking. It was produced by Magee TV in association with Food Network Canada.

== Overview ==
Mooking, a third-generation restaurateur, takes ingredients that are used in everyday cooking and shows how onw can use their flavors and/or texture in the dishes he prepares. Ingredients such as papaya, salt cod, duck, nori, and others are featured as the star ingredients. The purpose of the show is to focus on one "obedient ingredient" each episode, and to show how to shop for it, store it and then cook with it in various ways. The series is telecast on many channels, including the Food Network channel in Canada, Cooking channel in the US and Caribbean, Food TV on Channel 9 Sky Digital, Kuchnia TV in Poland, and in the Middle East.

Everyday Exotic premiered on May 31, 2008 and replaced the show Fine Living Network.

== Episode guide ==
Season 1

- Papaya
- Lychee
- Nori
- Sichuan peppercorn
- Thai basil
- Coriander/cilantro
- Miso
- Lemongrass
- Star anise
- Curry
- Panko
- Saffron
- Okra
- Plantain
- Coconut
- Water chestnuts
- Tamarind
- King oyster mushrooms
- Maple syrup
- Oyster sauce
- Paprika
- Mango
- Celeriac
- Cardamom

Season 2

- Camembert
- Prosciutto
- Duck
- Pine nuts
- Edamame
- Cajun spice
- Rapini
- Wonton
- Pork belly
- Buffalo mozzarella
- Avocado
- Peanuts
- Catfish
- Chipotle
- Daikon
- Caraway
- Nappa cabbage
- Lime leaf
- Fermented black beans
- Blood orange
- Persimmon
- Jerusalem artichoke
- Tahini
- Pistachio
- Salt cod
- Passion fruit

== Broadcasters ==
- Original

- Food Network Canada

- Syndicate

- Cooking Channel
