= Erik Alcock =

- Origin: Toronto, Ontario, Canada
- Occupations: Songwriter; composer; musician; singer
- Years active: 1999–present
- Member of: The New Royales

Erik Alcock (born 1983) is a Canadian songwriter, composer, musician and singer. He is a frequent collaborator with DJ Khalil, with whom he has written and played on two Grammy Award-winning albums (Eminem's Recovery and The Marshall Mathers LP 2, both of which won Best Rap Album), as well as P!nk's Grammy-nominated album The Truth About Love. He has also written music for Celine Dion, Pitbull, Tyga, Royce da 5'9", Professor Green and Guess Who. Both Alcock and DJ Khalil are members of the group The New Royales, which also includes Liz Rodrigues and Chin Injeti.

== Personal life ==
Alcock was born in Toronto, Ontario, Canada. In 2016, he relocated to Los Angeles and now resides in Berlin, Germany.
