= Women Ah Run Tings =

Canadian musical group

Women Ah Run Tings was an all-female dancehall/reggae/R&B/hip hop Canadian group that existed from 1993 through to at least 2002. Nominated for a Canadian Reggae Award three times, the group was founded by Lady Luscious (Jannett Scott-Jones).

La Bomba, a rapper, said "It was the first time I had met a bunch of females who thought it was cool to rock walls and play music."

== Members ==
At various, and sometimes overlapping, times:

- MC Luscious
- Tini
- Derek Graham, guitar
- La Bomba, rapper
- Paula Gonzalez
- Mick the Specialist, bass
- Angel, vocals
- Rexx, rapper
