= The New Royales =

Four-person music group

- Origin: Vancouver, Canada; Toronto, Canada; Los Angeles, U.S.
- Genres: Hip hop; alternative rock
- Occupations: Record producers; songwriters
- Members: DJ Khalil; Chin Injeti; Liz Rodrigues; Erik Alcock
- Website: thenewroyales.com

The New Royales are a four-person music group consisting of members DJ Khalil, Chin Injeti, Liz Rodrigues, and Erik Alcock. Since forming in 2007, they have worked together as producers and songwriters for artists such as Eminem, Pitbull, Pink, Bishop Lamont, Jay Electronica and more. The group is known for incorporating musical styles from multiple genres, drawing influence from hip hop and soul, Brazilian and Portuguese music, to rock and pop music.

Widely known as a production group for other artists, they released their first official mixtape Freedom's for the Brave on January 14, 2014. Freedom's for the Brave pays homage to a number of the group's influences, featuring covers of bands and groups such as The Kinks, The Monks, The Beatles, The White Stripes, Depeche Mode and more. They followed this with the release of Ready to Break in 2015.

== Discography ==
=== 2008 ===
- Bishop Lamont – The Confessional

05. "City Lights" (featuring Erik of The New Royales)

=== 2009 ===
- Pitbull – Rebelution

07. "Can't Stop Me Now" (featuring The New Royales)

- Slaughterhouse (group) – Slaughterhouse

05. "The One"

=== 2010 ===
- Chin Injeti – D'tach

05. "Separated" (featuring The New Royales)
06. "Love Is Not War" (featuring Zaki Ibrahim)

- Eminem – Recovery

02. "Talkin' 2 Myself" (featuring Kobe)
04. "Won't Back Down" (featuring Pink)
12. "25 to Life"
14. "Almost Famous"

- EA Sports – "Fight Night Champion"
  - "China"
  - "Live 4 Tomorrow"
  - "Red"
  - "Organ Man"
  - "Running Thru"

=== 2012 ===
- Pink – The Truth About Love

11. "Here Comes the Weekend" (featuring Eminem)

=== 2013 ===
- Eminem – The Marshall Mathers LP 2

05. "Survival"

=== 2014 ===
- The New Royales – Freedom's for the Brave

=== 2015 ===
- Eminem - "Kings Never Die" (featuring Gwen Stefani)
- The New Royales - "Ready to Break"
