= Ivana Santilli =

Canadian musical artist

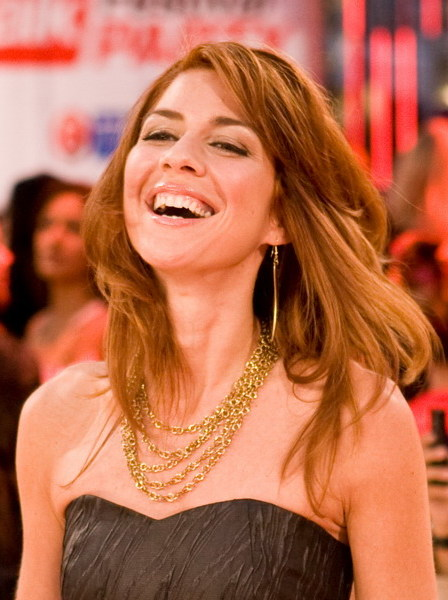
- Santilli at the 2008 Toronto International Film Festival.

Background information
- Born: August 4, 1975 (age 51); Toronto, Ontario, Canada
- Origin: Toronto, Ontario, Canada
- Instruments: Keyboards, Trumpet
- Years active: 1991-present
- Labels: Brown Recordings Inc., CP Records
- Formerly of: Bass is Base
- Website: ivanasantilli.com

Ivana Daniela Santilli (born August 4, 1975) is a Canadian R&B singer and multi-instrumentalist who has recorded as a solo artist and as a member of the 1990s R&B/pop trio Bass is Base.

== Early life and career ==
Santilli was born to an Italian father and a French-Canadian mother. She began performing at the age of nine, playing the trumpet in her father's Italian wedding band in Toronto. Santilli is also fluent in Italian and French.

== Career ==
During her schooling, she joined her first band, Bass is Base, which gained national attention. The trio's funk and soul fusion garnered them a number of Juno, CMVA, and MMVA awards, and they released two albums with A&M/Polygram and Island Records in the U.S.

Bass is Base broke up, and Santilli asked to be released from her contract with A&M records. She wrote and recorded 10 new songs as a solo artist within a month of the breakup. She then began working as a session musician (keyboards, backing vocals) with Soul Attorneys, Women Ah Run Tings, Punjabi by Nature and Holly McNarland.

Santilli began a solo career in 1999. She performed in Toronto at The Bamboo Club in March, and released her album Brown in April. That year she performed in Hamilton as part of Showcase '99.

The album Brown sold very well, outselling some major label releases. The album included soul and bossa nova, as well as drum 'n bass ("Sun + Moon = Tomorrow"), and featured Santilli's vocals, keys, and trumpet. The album led to a Juno nomination in 2000 as best new solo artist, and also featured '"If Ever I Fall", a duet with singer Glenn Lewis during his early career.

Santilli toured across North America, including a performance at the 1999 Stardust Picnic festival at Historic Fort York, Toronto. She played live with James Brown, Tito Puente, Barenaked Ladies, De La Soul, Jamiroquai, Brand New Heavies, The Fugees, Jann Arden, Maceo Parker, Sylk130, Bahamadia, Pharcyde, and The Roots. One of her three performances during the Montreal Jazz Festival was the subject of a one-hour Bravo! television special. Peer publishing signed her as a writer in the fall of 2000.

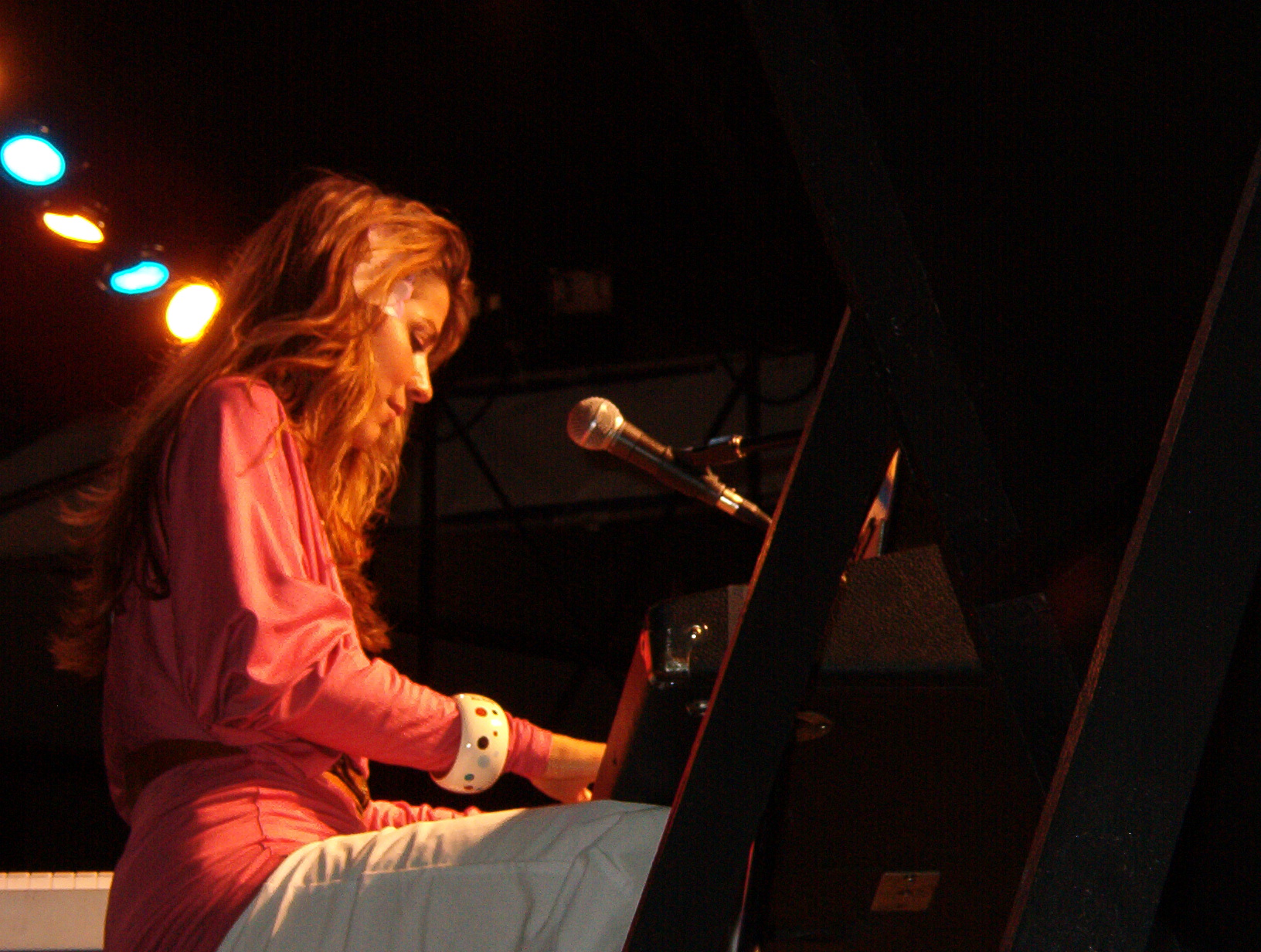
Santilli at the Montreal Jazz Fest in 2004

In August 2004, she released her second album, Corduroy Boogie, which included the singles, "Deserve", "Superstar" and "What Matters". The video version of "What Matters" appears on a various artists compilation titled Required Listening. This album featured collaborations with James Poyser, King Britt, Dwele, Dego (4Hero), Kaidi Tatham (Bugz In The Attic), soul legend Omar, Stuart Matthewman (Sade, Maxwell, Sweetback). She worked as a keyboardist in remix collaborations for Jazzanova, King Britt, Scuba, Vikter Duplaix, Steven Spacek, All Saints, Appleton ("Don't Worry"), Rosey (Def Jam), Roy Ayers, and Larry Gold. After touring Japan (blue note), and Europe, in New York, she appeared as an instrumentalist on various soundtrack recordings for film. Her third album TO.NY was released in June, 2008 with the singles "Whateva U Want" and "Been Thru This" which reached #91 on the Canadian Hot 100.

Santilli signed to CP Records and released her fourth studio album, Santilli in June, 2010. The first single was "Your Girl Tonight", followed by "Letting Go". Three of the songs on Santilli are new compositions and recordings, three are remixes, while the remaining six were remastered from TO.NY. The album featured collaborations with Nasri Atweh, Adam Messinger, Belly, DaHeala, and Ethan White.

Ivana's fifth studio album Late Night Light was pre-released on February 13, 2015, and released digitally worldwide on March 10, 2015. It features collaborations with Mike Lindup, Eon Sinclair, and Stuart Matthewman.

Santilli began doing voice-over work in 2015 and has done commercials for Bank of Montreal, Marshalls, and WestJet.

She has composed music for film including an indie short art film that was scheduled for release in fall of 2021.

== Discography ==
=== Albums ===
- April 1999: Brown (Brown Recordings)
- August 2004: Corduroy Boogie (Brown Recordings)
- June 2008: TO.NY (Brown Recordings) review
- June 2010: Santilli (CP Records)
- March 2015: Late Night Light (Brown Recordings)

=== Singles ===
Year	Single	CAN	Album
1999	"Too Deep"	-	Brown
1999	"Sun + Moon = Tomorrow"	-	Brown
1999	"If I Ever Fall (Pt. 1)" (feat. Glenn Lewis)	-	Brown
2000	"Lonely Lullaby"	-	Brown
2004	"Deserve"	-	Corduroy Boogie
2004	"Superstar"	-	Corduroy Boogie
2005	"What Matters"	-	Corduroy Boogie
2008	"Whateva U Want"	-	TO.NY
2008	"Been Thru This"	91	TO.NY
2009	"Hollywood"	-	TO.NY
2009	"Your Girl Tonight"	-	Santilli
2010	"Letting Go"	-	Santilli
2016	"Lovers Love 2 Rock" (feat. Mike Lindup)	-	Late Night Light
