= Southpaw (film) =

2015 film by Antoine Fuqua

- Theatrical release poster
- Directed by: Antoine Fuqua
- Written by: Kurt Sutter
- Produced by: Todd Black; Jason Blumenthal; Steve Tisch; Peter Riche; Alan Riche; Antoine Fuqua; Jerry Ye
- Starring: Jake Gyllenhaal; Forest Whitaker; Naomie Harris; Curtis "50 Cent" Jackson; Oona Laurence; Rachel McAdams
- Cinematography: Mauro Fiore
- Edited by: John Refoua
- Music by: James Horner
- Production companies: Wanda Pictures; Riche Productions; Escape Artists; Fuqua Films
- Distributed by: The Weinstein Company
- Release dates: June 15, 2015 (SIFF); July 24, 2015 (United States)
- Running time: 123 minutes
- Countries: United States; China
- Language: English
- Budget: $30 million
- Box office: $94.2 million

Southpaw is a 2015 American sports drama film directed by Antoine Fuqua, written by Kurt Sutter and starring Jake Gyllenhaal, Forest Whitaker and Rachel McAdams. The film follows a boxer who sets out to get his life back on track after losing his wife to gun violence and later his young daughter to child protective services. The film was released on July 24, 2015, by The Weinstein Company. The film received mixed reviews from critics, while Gyllenhaal and Oona Laurence's performances received positive reviews. The film grossed $94.2 million worldwide against a production budget of $30 million.

The film is set in New York City, but it was filmed in Pittsburgh and the nearby town of Indiana, Pennsylvania.

The film marked one of the last films to be scored by James Horner and the first of three posthumous releases to feature his music (the other two being The 33 and The Magnificent Seven). The film and the film's soundtrack album are dedicated to his memory.

== Plot ==
Professional boxer Billy "the Great" Hope, the reigning champion in the Light Heavyweight division with an Orthodox stance and a unbroken record of 42 wins, resides in New York City with his wife, Maureen, and their daughter, Leila. During a match against Darius Jones at Madison Square Garden, he is horrifically injured in the face several times, resulting in profuse bleeding out of his eye, frightening Maureen. Nonetheless, he wins the match by knockout and retains the light heavyweight title. While the press surrounds Billy, a younger upstart boxer, Miguel "Magic" Escobar, taunts Billy to fight him. Upon returning home, Maureen urges him to retire. Later, she rejects the plan of his manager, Jordan Mains, to get him to sign a two-year deal for three more fights.

At a fundraiser ball for the orphanage where he and his wife met, Billy delivers a speech, thanking Maureen, Leila, Jordan, and his friends for his success. Unfortunately, Miguel is also attending, and as Billy departs, Miguel goads him by insulting Maureen and saying he will take his titles away from him, leading to a brawl. A gunshot from Miguel's brother Hector rings out and Billy notices that Maureen has been accidentally shot. Hector flees while she perishes in Billy's arms.

Shortly thereafter, Billy begins abusing alcohol and drugs while obsessively pursuing Hector. He eventually discovers his whereabouts, but encounters his drug-addict wife Maria and realizes Hector is a father. Jordan suggests Billy sell the house to liquidate his debts before then booking him a fight against Kalil Turay, who soundly defeats him. Blinded due to headshots, he accidentally headbutts the referee in the face and receives a yearlong suspension. Owing the referee and the network damages, he suffers the repossession of his house and belongings. Both Jordan and his longtime trainer Eli Frost abandon him for Miguel.

Upon awakening in the hospital after smashing his car into the tree outside his home one night, Billy discovers that Leila called 911 after finding him bleeding on the floor and Child Protective Services officer Angela Rivera is her current guardian. Despairing, Billy visits the Wills Gym, owned by former boxer Titus "Tick" Wills, whose final fight resulted in his blindness in one eye. Billy implores Tick to recuperate him, but noticing his drug problems, he declines and instead offers Billy a janitorial job.

When Billy, accompanied by Angela, visits Leila, she rebuffs him for causing their problems. Returning to the gym, he accepts Tick's offer; he eventually befriends a young aspiring boxer named Hoppy, subsequently notifying Tick upon learning that Hoppy's father abuses his mother. He continues visiting Leila, eventually winning her over. After winning a charity match, Billy is visited by Jordan. Now managing Miguel, who recently won a match against Kalil Turay, Jordan wants to book a fight between the two within six weeks, aware Billy will have insufficient time to prepare. Tick declines to train him, feeling Billy merely desires vengeance, but later learns that Hoppy has died after trying to defend his mother from his father, who shot him, and relents. Due to his remarkable progress rebuilding his life and career, Billy regains custody of Leila and reconciliatorily reconnects with her at Maureen's grave.

On the night of the fight, Angela and Leila view the match on the dressing room's closed-circuit TV. Once Miguel gains the early advantage, both fighters trade furious punches over each round. When Miguel insults Maureen's death, breaking Billy's concentration, Billy angrily lashes out, but after counsel from Tick, he recalibrates and in the final round, he gains the upper hand. In the final seconds, he blocks a jab from Miguel and lands a shot to the face before turning southpaw and with a furious left uppercut, he throws Miguel to the canvas.

Despite a split decision (final score 344–341, with Billy having 3 points over Miguel) conceding the first rounds to Miguel, Billy is crowned the new champion. Collapsing in his corner, he thanks Maureen's spirit before Tick and his entourage remove him as he happily closes his eyes tearfully. Sometime later, Leila encounters him in the dressing room and forgives him for his past mistakes; they embrace for the first time since Maureen's death.

== Cast ==
- Jake Gyllenhaal as Billy "The Great" Hope
- Forest Whitaker as Titus "Tick" Wills
- Rachel McAdams as Maureen Hope
- Oona Laurence as Leila Hope
- Naomie Harris as Angela Rivera
- Curtis "50 Cent" Jackson as Jordan Mains
- Miguel Gomez as Miguel "Magic" Escobar
- Danny Henriquez as Hector Escobar
- Rita Ora as Maria Escobar
- Skylan Brooks as Hoppy
- Victor Ortiz as Ramone
- Beau Knapp as Jon Jon
- Malcolm Mays as Gabe
- Clare Foley as Alice
- Jim Lampley as himself
- Roy Jones Jr. as himself

== Production ==
Eminem was originally supposed to play the role of Billy Hope. The film's screenwriter Kurt Sutter said the project was inspired by the rapper's personal struggles. He stated that he had meetings with Eminem's producing partners over the past seven years, looking for something to do together. "I know he's very selective and doesn't do a lot. But he shared so much of his personal struggle in this raw and very honest album, one that I connected with on a lot of levels. He is very interested in the boxing genre, and it seemed like an apt metaphor because his own life has been a brawl. In a way, this is a continuation of the 8 Mile (2002) story, but we are doing a metaphorical narrative of the second chapter of his life. He'll play a world champion boxer who really hits a hard bottom, and has to fight to win back his life for his young daughter. At its core, this is a retelling of his struggles over the last five years of his life, using the boxing analogy. I love that the title refers to Marshall being a lefty, which is to boxing what a white rapper is to hip hop; dangerous, unwanted, and completely unorthodox. It's a much harder road for a southpaw than a right-handed boxer." Producers Alan and Peter Riche have given a slightly different story about Eminem's involvement however stating that they set out to make a boxing movie similar to The Champ but wanted to make the story about a father-daughter relationship as opposed to The Champ's father-son story. Recalling Eminem's strong relationship with his daughter, they asked him and he was immediately receptive.

On December 13, 2010, DreamWorks acquired the script, with Eminem eyed to play the lead role, however the following August the studio dropped the project. Metro-Goldwyn-Mayer picked up the film that October. Although Eminem was reportedly passionate about the story, he ultimately exited the project in December 2012 to refocus on his music career, stating that he considered himself "a musician first and an actor second." Antoine Fuqua signed on to the project in March 2014 with Jake Gyllenhaal replacing Eminem. Other casting news was announced in May 2014 with Forest Whitaker, Lupita Nyong'o, and Rachel McAdams officially joining the cast. In August of that year, it was announced that Naomie Harris would be replacing Nyong'o. Tyrese Gibson was cast but his scenes were cut from the film.

Gyllenhaal did the research for his role by doing "tons of reading on boxers, orphan boxers, the spirit of gyms all over America, children who start early, [and] the history of foster care in America" while also spending five months training as a boxer. Eminem would later praise Gyllenhaal's performance, noting that "Jake smashed it" in an interview with Zane Lowe.

Southpaw marks the first investment in an American film by Wanda Pictures, a division of Wang Jianlin's Chinese conglomerate Dalian Wanda Group. Principal photography began on June 16, 2014.

It was originally to be set in Detroit, yet Pittsburgh was chosen for the filming and was used as a double for New York.

== Release ==
The film had its world premiere at the 2015 Shanghai International Film Festival on June 15, 2015, where it competed, and was released on July 24, 2015, by The Weinstein Company.

== Reception ==
=== Box office ===
Southpaw grossed $52.4 million in North America and $38.5 million in other territories for a total gross of $94.2 million, against a budget of $30 million.

In its opening weekend, the film grossed $16.7 million from 2,772 theaters, finishing 5th at the box office.

=== Critical response ===
The review aggregator website Rotten Tomatoes gives the film a rating of 59%, based on 238 reviews, with an average rating of 6/10. The site's critical consensus reads, "Jake Gyllenhaal delivers an impressively committed performance, but Southpaw beats it down with a dispiriting drama that pummels viewers with genre clichés." On Metacritic, the film has a score of 57 out of 100, based on 42 critics, indicating "mixed or average reviews". On CinemaScore, audiences gave the film an average grade of "A" on an A+ to F scale.

Soren Anderson of The Seattle Times gave the film two and a half stars out of four, saying "Southpaw, a boxing movie with a theme of redemption, is redeemed by the performances of its two main actors, Jake Gyllenhaal and Forest Whitaker." Ty Burr of The Boston Globe gave the film two and a half stars out of four, saying "This is a genre with especially sturdy bones, and when Southpaw connects, which is more often than you might expect, you feel it down to your toes." Ann Hornaday of The Washington Post gave the film one and a half stars out of four, saying "Southpaw may be rote, predictable and mawkish, but none of those faults lie in its star. Even when he looks like an unholy mess, he transcends the movie he's in." Steven Rea of The Philadelphia Inquirer gave the film three out of four stars, saying "What keeps this cornball business from getting out of hand is the commitment of Gyllenhaal, whose performance is fierce and muscular, in and out of the ring." Michael Phillips of the Chicago Tribune gave the film two and a half stars out of four, saying "The script may have hamburger for brains, but Fuqua slams it home with the help of actors who give their all – even when giving a little less might have made things more interesting."

Peter Howell of the Toronto Star gave the film two and a half stars out of four, saying "This isn't great cinema, but it's satisfying movie-making, with nothing more on its mind than telling a heart-tugging story." A. O. Scott of The New York Times said, "I wish I could say Southpaw was a knockout, or even a contender, that it went the distance or scored on points. But it's strictly an undercard bout, displaying enough heart and skill to keep the paying customers from getting too restless." Benjamin Nugent of The New York Times has compared the film to Robert De Niro stating, "Pity Jake Gyllenhaal, who despite getting shredded for Southpaw, could not outbox the shadow of Robert De Niro's Raging Bull performance." Chris Nashawaty of Entertainment Weekly gave the film a C+, saying "Just as director Antoine Fuqua starts to close in on something interesting and unexpected, he retreats to the safety of his corner and gives us what we've seen too many times before: a predictable flurry of melodramatic jabs." Barbara VanDenburgh of The Arizona Republic gave the film three out of five stars, saying "Southpaw is all about the fist. There's no delicate footwork here, no lingering grace notes. It's a film played entirely in power chords." James Berardinelli of ReelViews gave the film three out of four stars, saying "Southpaw isn't content with presenting a gallery of clichéd characters. It takes the time to put flesh on the bones." Colin Covert of the Star Tribune gave the film one out of four stars, slamming Gyllenhaal's performance, saying "As a troubled slugger, Gyllenhaal is impressively muscle-bound, but gives no knockout performance. His work drags on like 12 rounds of fistfight fatigue."

=== Accolades ===
Award	Category	Recipient	Result	Ref.
Black Reel Awards	Best Director	Antoine Fuqua	Nominated	
Black Reel Awards	Best Supporting Actor	Forest Whitaker	Nominated	
Jupiter Award	Best International Actor	Jake Gyllenhaal	Nominated	
Golden Reel Awards	Sound Effects and Foley in a Feature Film		Nominated	
NAACP Image Awards	Outstanding Supporting Actor in a Motion Picture	Forest Whitaker	Nominated	
Washington D.C. Area Film Critics Association	Best Youth Performance	Oona Laurence	Nominated	

== Soundtrack ==
Eminem executive-produced the soundtrack, which was released by Shady Records on July 24, 2015. He had previously released his single called "Phenomenal" from the soundtrack on June 2, 2015.

Composer James Horner agreed to create the score for Southpaw for free, as he was deeply moved by the film's story and believed in its creative vision, despite the film's limited budget.

An album of James Horner's score was released through Sony Classical on July 24, 2015. This was Horner's final score (it was recorded after The 33, although Southpaw was released first); he was killed in a plane crash on June 22, 2015.

An unreleased Frank Ocean song titled "Wiseman" appears in the film's closing act. The track was originally written for Quentin Tarantino's Django Unchained, but Tarantino chose not to include it, stating he did not want to "cheapen" Ocean's effort by adding it without a proper place in the film.

== See also ==
- List of boxing films
