= Kaws =

American artist and designer (born 1974)

- Born: Brian Donnelly; November 4, 1974 (age 51); Jersey City, New Jersey, US
- Education: School of Visual Arts
- Known for: Painting, graphic design, sculpture, graffiti, toys, collectibles
- Notable work: Companion
- Website: kawsone.com

Brian Donnelly (born November 4, 1974), known professionally as KAWS, is an American artist and designer whose work centers on repeated use of a cast of figurative characters and motifs, some dating back to the beginning of his career in the 1990s. He initially painted these figures in 2D and later realized in 3D. Some of his characters are his own creations while others are reworked versions of existing icons.

KAWS' sculptures range in size from a few inches to ten meters tall, and are made from various materials including fiberglass, aluminum, wood, bronze, gold and a steel pontoon inflatable raft.

KAWS has been compared to Andy Warhol for his cross-market appeal and ability to blur lines between commercial and fine art. His work is exhibited in galleries and museums, held in the permanent collections of public institutions, and avidly collected by individuals including music producer Swizz Beatz, youtuber PewDiePie, rappers Pharrell Williams, Kid Cudi, and members of South Korean group BTS. Several books have been published illustrating his work.

Based in Brooklyn, New York, KAWS divides his practice between sculptures, acrylic paintings on canvas, and screen prints alongside commercial collaboration, that span limited-edition toys, clothing, skateboard decks, and other products. He is represented by Skarstedt Gallery, New York.

== Early life and education ==
Donnelly was born in 1974 in Jersey City, New Jersey, where he attended St. Anthony High School. As a teenager, Donnelly created the "KAWS" name (based on the way the letters looked—the word, in fact, has no meaning), which he painted on the roof of an area building so that he could see it outside while attending class in high school. He went on to attend the School of Visual Arts in New York City, receiving a Bachelor of Fine Arts in illustration in 1996. Following graduation, he briefly worked for Jumbo Pictures as a freelance animator painting backgrounds for the animated series 101 Dalmatians, Daria and Doug.

Moving to New York City in the 1990s, KAWS pursued illegal graffiti. Animator by day, and graffiti artist by night, KAWS started subvertising billboards, bus shelters, and phone booths, using a skeleton key gifted to him by friend and fellow graffiti artist Barry McGee. Using a key he created for himself, he also started subvertising bus shelters. KAWS has since subvertised in Paris, London, Berlin, and Tokyo.

== Artworks ==
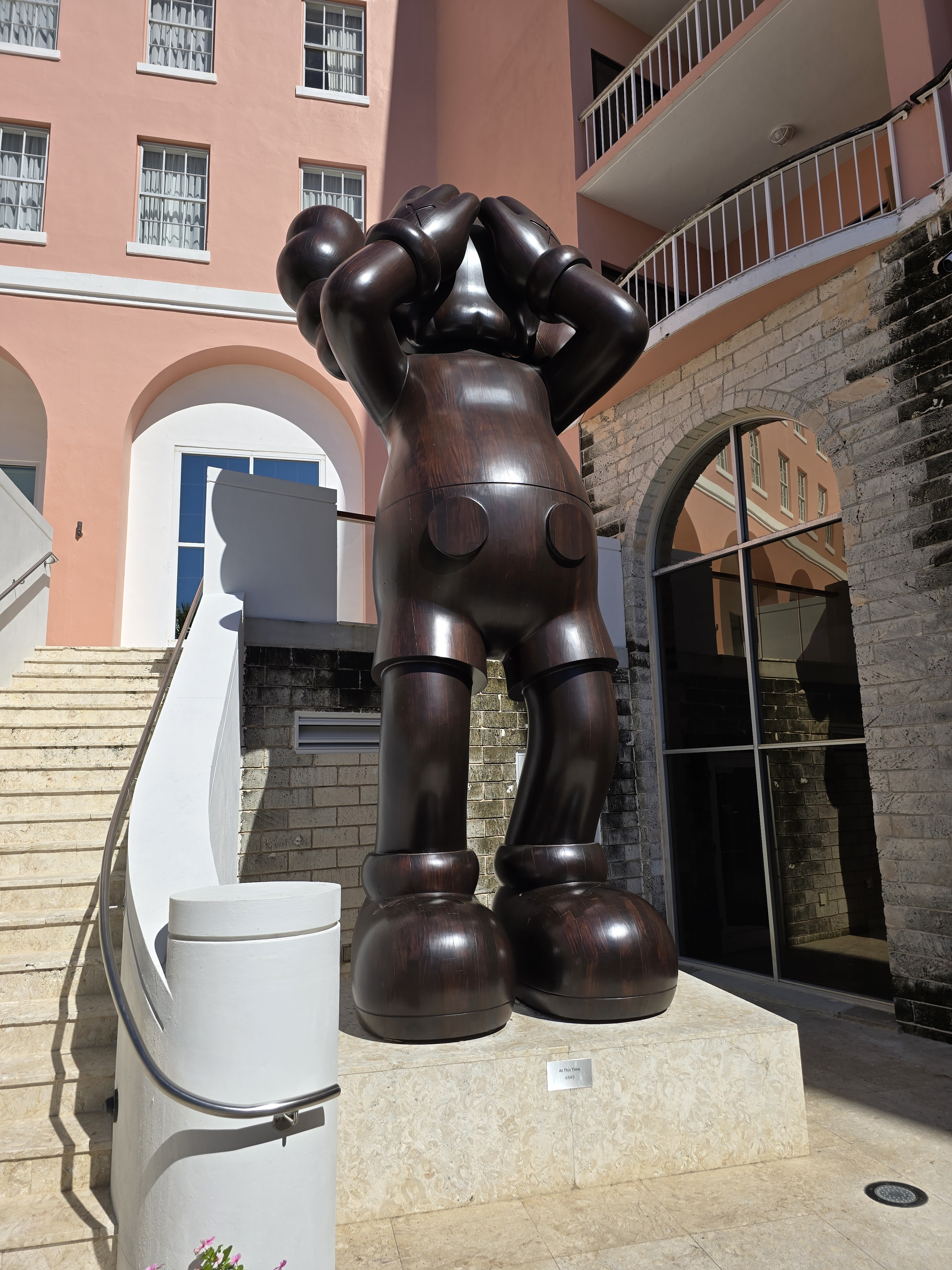
Kaws's At This Time, featuring his Companion character, Hamilton Princess & Beach Club

KAWS' acrylic paintings and sculpture have many repeating images, meant to be universally understood. Some of his characters date back to the beginning of his career in the 1990s: Companion (created in 1999), Accomplice, Chum, and Bendy. His series The Kimpsons subverted the American cartoon The Simpsons.

KAWS' Companion is a grayscale clown-like figure based on Mickey Mouse with his face obscured by both hands, and two bones sticking out of his head. In 1999, the Japanese toy company Bounty Hunter produced and sold a vinyl Companion toy (Mickey Mouse with X-ed out eyes). The figure was adapted into a balloon for the 2012 Macy's Thanksgiving Day Parade, as part of its "Blue Sky Gallery" of balloons. Having already created oversized sculptures in the past, KAWS started to produce further sculptures of his Companion character for exhibitions in Switzerland, Hong Kong, Taiwan, Málaga, London, and China.

He has periodically shown both paintings and products at Colette in Paris since 1999. His work was included in the traveling exhibition Beautiful Losers, which started at the Cincinnati Contemporary Art Center and traveled throughout the US and Europe, including his then-largest museum show to date at the High Museum of Art in Atlanta, GA in 2012. KAWS' work was showcased in another High Museum exhibit in 2021-2022 titled "KAWS PRINTS".

Since 2018 Espacio SOLO, Colección SOLO museum in Madrid, shows in its main hall Companion (Resting place) as part of its permanent exhibitions.

KAWS' style can be characterized by an emphasis on color and line, distinctive graphics, such as the repeated use of "x"'s on the hands, nose, eyes, ears, and the appropriation of pop culture icons such as Mickey Mouse, the Michelin Man, and his characters are generally depicted in a shy or powerless pose often with their hands over their nose. In his paintings, Kaws always deconstructs his appropriation of iconic characters into shapes that produces abstract paintings.

On May 2, 2023, KAWS scored a legal victory against a Singaporean man who he accused of counterfeiting, with others, replicas of the artist's Companion figure and other toys, skateboards, and artworks.

== Products and commercial collaborations ==
Since his first vinyl toy with the Japanese clothing brand Bounty Hunter in 1999, he has collaborated on toys with other Japanese companies: Nigo for A Bathing Ape (Bape), Medicom Toy, and Santastic!. Since the beginning of their partnership in 2001, Nigo and KAWS have collaborated on the packaging for KAWS' "The Kimpsons" exhibit and three seasons of A Bathing Ape. He and Medicom Toy ran OriginalFake, a brand and store in Aoyama, from 2006 to May 2013.

KAWS has also collaborated with Jun Takahashi for the brand Undercover, as a voice-over artist for Michael "Mic" Neumann's Kung Faux, and worked on projects with Burton, Vans, Supreme and DC Shoes. There are KAWS-designed small edition bottles for Dos Equis and Hennessy, rugs for Gallery 1950 and packaging for Kiehl's cosmetics. In 2004, he collaborated with Undefeated Brand on a billboard project in Los Angeles. In 2008 he collaborated with John Mayer to produce a collection of guitar picks.

In 2008, he created cover art for musicians Towa Tei, Cherie, Clipse (Til the Casket Drops) and Kanye West (808s & Heartbreak) as well as designed Nike Air Force 1 trainers (the Nike 1World project involved 18 total designers). And in March 2017, the Nike subsidiary Air Jordan released a capsule collection in collaboration with KAWS – an Air Jordan 4 model customized by him, and a number of apparel pieces. He has also recently contributed a lot to the Hip Hop community with merch lines associated with artists such as Travis Scott with his April 2021 single "The Scotts" featuring Kid Cudi who has also been working closely with Brian in recent merchandise releases. With Merch ranging from KAWS collaborated artwork specially created with handcrafted clothing to vinyl and cassette covers. i-D and Travis Scott collaborated merch.

In November/December 2010 he illustrated magazine covers for The New Yorker, Clark Magazine, i-D and Sneeze Magazine. In 2011, KAWS appeared on the Bravo reality competition series Work of Art: The Next Great Artist, where he was a guest judge for the Season 2 finale. For the 2013 MTV Video Music Awards, KAWS redesigned the MTV Moonman trophy in the form of his "Companion" character, and his 3D model was used to create a 60-foot tall inflatable version. He also redesigned various event materials. In 2014, KAWS designed the bottle artwork for the scent Girl, by Comme des Garçons and Pharrell Williams.

In 2016, KAWS entered into an ongoing relationship with clothing store Uniqlo to produce a line of affordable T-shirts and accessories; the first line was clothing and soft toys based on the popular children's show Sesame Street. In April 2017, Uniqlo released a line of Peanuts-themed T-shirts, accessories, and plushies designed by Kaws; and in November 2018, KAWS created a second line range of Sesame Street-themed clothing and soft toys. In May 2017, the Museum of Modern Art (MoMA) in New York City released limited supplies of the $200 KAWS Companion action figure, resulting in the MoMA Design Store website crashing due to the unprecedented rush of traffic. In May 2018, Kaws installed two 26-foot-tall Companion and BFF sculptures at a shopping complex in Changsha, China.

In October 2019, KAWS unveiled "Waiting", a sculpture in Greenpoint, Brooklyn located in front of 21 India Street. In July 2021, KAWS collaborated with Travis Scott. In October 2021, the KAWS Skeleton outfit was released in Epic Games' Fortnite: Battle Royale in collaboration with KAWS. KAWSPeely, a second outfit based on the character Peely, was released in July 2022. In July 2022 KAWS collaborated with J-Hope, one of the members of BTS, for his solo album cover. The 2022 release of General Mills' Monster Cereals features box art by Kaws. In April 2023, KAWS collaborated with the Brooklyn Nets to release their 2023/24 City Edition Jerseys for the upcoming NBA season. In July 2025 KAWS reunited with Clipse, designing their Let God Sort Em Out album cover.

On September 16, 2025, Uniqlo announced that KAWS would become their first Artist in Residence, which would involve overseeing future art projects and collaborations.

== KAWS Album controversy ==
Comic book artist Bill Morrison felt "ripped off" by KAWS' 2005 work The KAWS Album because the work was simply a "traced interpretation of my Simpsons Yellow Album" (released in 1998 and signed by Matt Groening), which itself was a parody of the cover art for the Beatles album Sgt. Pepper's Lonely Hearts Club Band replaced with characters from the Simpsons.

In response to the sale of The KAWS Album at Sotheby's, Anny Shaw wrote that KAWS has not moved on from being a street artist, and that his work is conceptually bankrupt. M. H. Miller views Brian Donnelly's career in light of the current state of the art world, where contemporary works are less about cultural value than providing a place to invest the wealth of billionaires. KAWS is given credit for being modest about his work by claiming that it is not worth the high prices brought upon resale.

== Art market ==
In May 2017, UK auction house Phillips sold a KAWS Seated Companion (2011) sculpture for approximately US $411,000.

On April 1, 2019, at Sotheby's in Hong Kong, The KAWS Album (2005), a painting by KAWS commissioned by Nigo, sold for 115.9 million Hong Kong dollars, or about $14.7 million U.S. dollars, a new auction record for the artist at the time.

== Collections ==
KAWS' work is held in the following permanent public collections:

- Modern Art Museum of Fort Worth, Fort Worth, TX: acquired Where the End Starts in 2012
- Brooklyn Museum, Brooklyn, NY: 1 piece, "Along the Way"
- Museum of Contemporary Art San Diego, San Diego, CA: 1 piece
- One Campus Martius, Detroit, MI: 1 piece, "Waiting"

== Publications ==
- Kaws Exposed. Seattle: ARO Space, 1999. ISBN 9789110509443. Edition of 2000 copies. 31 pages of photographs of his graffiti.
- Kaws One. Tokyo: Little More, 2001. Edited by Kawachi, Taka and Akio E-da. ISBN 978-4898150450.
- Kaws C10: The Paintings of Kaws. Seattle: Neverstop, 2002. ISBN 9780971709409. With an introduced by Carlo McCormick. Edition of 3000 copies.
- Kaws: 1993-2010. Skira Rizzoli), 2009. Written by Mónica Ramírez-Montagut. ISBN 978-0847834341. A retrospective, with illustrations and text. Edited by Ian Luna and Lauren A. Gould and with a contribution by Germano Celant.
- Kaws: Downtime. Atlanta, GA: High Museum of Art, 2012. Edited by Michael Rooks and Seth Zucker. ISBN 9781932543476. With a foreword by Michael E. Shapiro, an essay by Rooks, and a list of Kaws exhibitions. 112 pages. A catalogue to accompany the exhibition Downtime at High Museum of Art.
- Kaws: Final Days Exhibition Catalogue. 82 pages covering an exhibition at the Center of Contemporary Art of Malaga in 2014.
- Kaws Exhibition Catalogue. Wakefield, England: Yorkshire Sculpture Park, 2016. Photographs by Jonty Wilde. ISBN 978-1-908432-21-6. A catalogue to accompany an exhibition at Yorkshire Sculpture Park. With texts by Flavia Frigeri, Helen Pheby, and Clare Lilley.
- KAWS: Where the End Starts. 2017. With text by: Andrea Karnes, Dieter Buchhart, and Michael Auping. ISBN 9780929865362.

== General references ==
- Thomas, Susan E. (2009). "Value and Validity of Art Zines as an Art Form", The Alternative Music Zine Scene, 28 (31).
- Thomas, Susan E. (2007). "Zeroing In on Contemporary, Independent Visual Arts Magazines", Notes, 26 (49).
- Smith, William S. (3 September 2019). "What the Rise of KAWS Says About the Art World’s Ailments.", Art in America. Retrieved 14 April 2023.
- Smith, William S. (3 September 2019). "What the Rise of KAWS Says About the Art World’s Ailments.", Art in America, "makes the art world uncomfortable." - Anne Pasternak, (par. 2). Retrieved 21 April 2023.
