= Adidas Ultraboost =

Line of shoes produced by Adidas

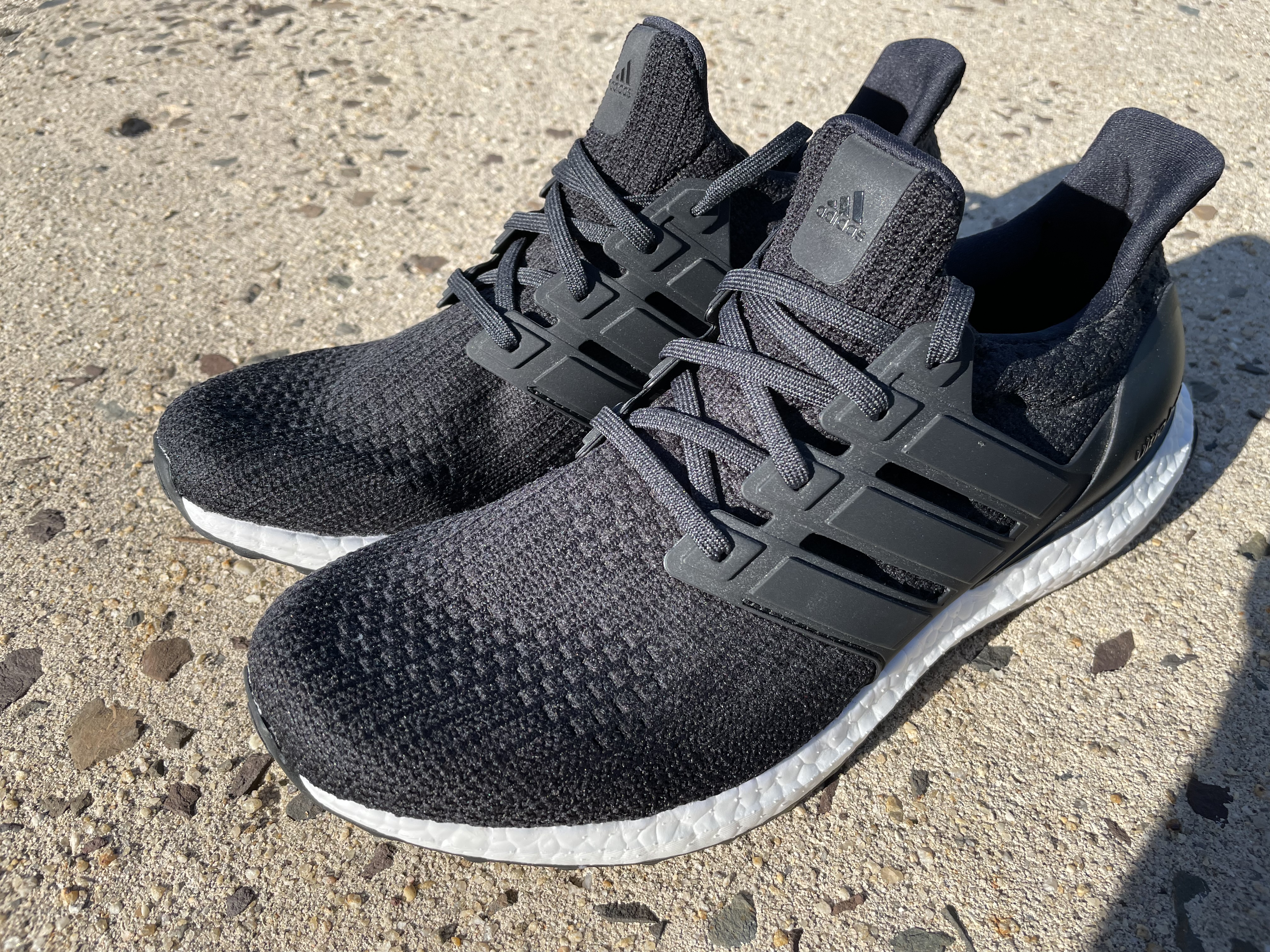
- Type: Sneakers
- Inventor: Adidas
- Inception: 2015; 11 years ago
- Manufacturer: Adidas
- Website: adidas.com/ultraboost

Adidas Ultraboost is a line of shoes produced by Adidas, with the first model released in 2015. Ultraboost shoes use Adidas' Boost foam in the soles. While not the first shoe to incorporate boost foam, it was the first popular line to use it.

== Performance ==
The first shoe in the Ultraboost line was a performance running shoe. The shoe was released in February 2015. The shoe became popular a couple of months later when Kanye West wore a pair during his performance at the Billboard Music Awards.

== Models ==
=== Adidas Ultraboost 1.0 ===
Released in 2015 as simply the Adidas Ultraboost, the Adidas Ultraboost 1.0 was the first shoe ever to use the Boost technology from Adidas. It had a knitted upper called Primeknit on top of the Boost sole and plastic cases on the sides to represent the three-stripe logo and house the laces.

=== Adidas Ultraboost ST ===
Released in late 2015, this version of the original Ultraboost claimed to incorporate an Engineered Stability break in the sole to improve stability. It debuted with a slimmer cage and color options.

=== Adidas Ultraboost Uncaged ===
Many Ultraboost customers cut off the cage around the side of the shoes in order to have a more simplistic look. Adidas then released an official version of the Ultraboost that removed the cages. This version was first released in June 2016.

=== Adidas Ultraboost 2.0 ===
This version added color options.

=== Adidas Ultraboost X ===
In 2017, Adidas released an Ultraboost model specifically for women. The shoe features the same design, but has the cage go around the sides of the shoe and connect at the top displaying the three stripe logo on the knitted upper.

=== Adidas Ultraboost Laceless ===
A simplified version of the Uncaged model that removed the laces and the logo.

=== Adidas Ultraboost Light ===
In February 2023, Adidas released the Ultraboost Light, with an advertised claim that the Boost material was 30% lighter than previous models.
