= Bass is Base =

Canadian R&B music group

- Origin: North York (Toronto), Ontario, Canada
- Genres: R&B; hip hop
- Years active: 1993–1997
- Label: A&M
- Past members: Chin Injeti; Ivana Santilli; Roger Mooking

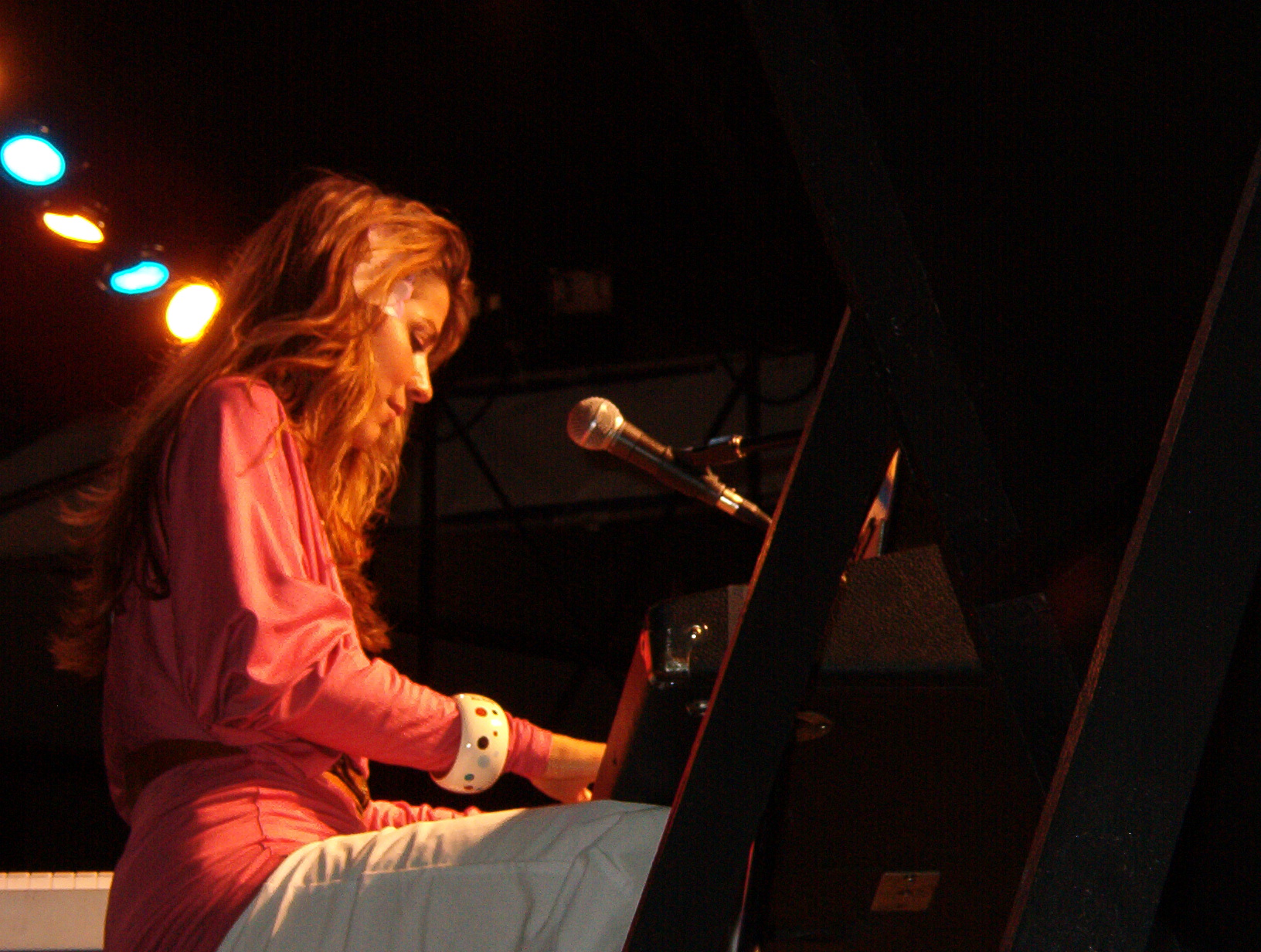
Ivana at Montreal Jazz Fest

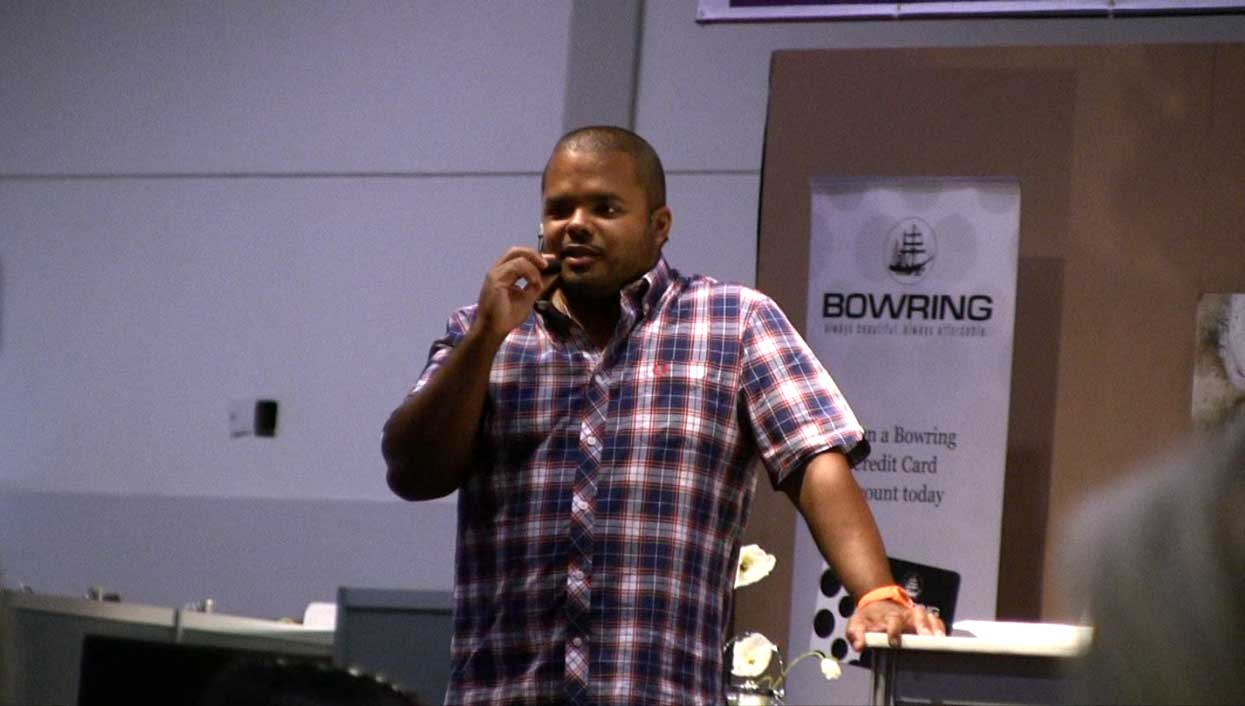
CNE-Roger-Mooking-2012

Bass is Base was a Canadian R&B group based in North York, Ontario.

== History ==
In 1993, Chin Injeti and Ivana Santilli were in the music group Syndicate 305. At the 1993 Music West conference in Vancouver, Injeti and Santilli met MC Mystic (Roger Mooking), who at the time was in a group called The Maximum Definitive. A few months later, Mystic invited the pair to back him for his group's performance at the Canadian Music Video Awards. The trio then formed the group Bass is Base that year with Injeti on bass, Santilli on keyboards, and Mystic on percussion. All three members contributed vocals, Injeti and Santilli as singers and Mystic as a rapper.

The group's first gig was opening for Jamiroquai. The group also opened for The Pharcyde. In the spring of 1994, the group released their debut album, First Impressions for the Bottom Jigglers. The album was released through their self-created label, SoulShack. They also released a single from the album, "Funkmobile", which featured a music video. The video was played on MuchMusic and was nominated for a MuchMusic Video Award for "Best Independent Music Video". Their album went on to sell more than 20,000 copies in Canada. In October 1994, the group signed a co-venture deal with A&M Records and Loose Cannon Records in the U.S. The group won a Juno Award in the Best R&B/Soul Recording category in 1995.

In 1994 and 1995, the group toured through Canada with Barenaked Ladies and the Crash Test Dummies. On September 27, 1995, the group released their Memories of the Soul Shack Survivors album in Canada. The album peaked at No. 38 on the RPM Canadian albums chart. The album was released in the US on April 16, 1996. They released one top 40 hit, "I Cry".

In May 1997, Bass is Base broke up and all members pursued solo endeavours.

=== Aftermath ===
After Bass is Base disbanded, Santilli went on to a release four solo albums. Injeti works as a producer and bass player; in 2005 he produced "hick-hop" artist Ridley Bent's debut release, Blam. Pranam Chin Injetii went on to work on the Grammy winning album Recovery by Eminem as well as songs by Drake, The Clipse and Kanye West. His work with rapper Eminem includes the Grammy-winning 2010 album Recovery and 2013's Marshall Mathers LP 2, as well as the track “Survival” from the video game Call of Duty: Ghosts. He’s worked with Dr. Dre, 50 Cent (Before I Self-Destruct), Virginia hip-hop trio Clipse featuring Kanye West (“Kinda Like a Big Deal”), not to mention Toronto’s own Drake on the mega-star’s So Far Gone mixtape/EP. Another album he worked on picked up a Grammy as well – Christian hip-hop artist Lecrae’s Gravity. Mooking left the music business, working as a chef in Toronto and as an entrepreneur in the food industry; he returned to release two albums of soul music in 2008 and 2013.

== Discography ==
=== Singles ===
- 1994 "Funkmobile" (Soul Shack)
- 1995 "Straw Stix & Brix" (Soul Shack)
- 1995 "Westside Funk" (Soul Shack)
- 1995 "Diamond Dreams" (Loose Cannon/A&M Records)
- 1995 "Floating" (Loose Cannon/A&M)
- 1996 "I Cry" (Loose Cannon/A&M)
- 1996 "Why" (Loose Cannon/A&M)

=== Albums ===
- 1994 First Impressions for the Bottom Jigglers
- 1995 Memories of the Soul Shack Survivors
