= DJ Khalil =

American record producer and DJ from Washington

- Also known as: Doc Hazzard
- Born: Khalil Abdul-Rahman; October 16, 1974 (age 51); Seattle, Washington, U.S.
- Origin: Los Angeles, California, U.S.
- Genres: Hip hop; soul
- Occupations: Record producer; disc jockey; musician; songwriter
- Years active: 1997–present
- Labels: S.O.L.; Landspeed; Nature Sounds; Up Above; Aftermath
- Member of: Self Scientific; The New Royales; Soul Assassins
- Formerly of: Strong Arm Steady
- Father: Walt Hazzard

Khalil Abdul-Rahman Hazzard (born October 16, 1974), professionally known as DJ Khalil, is an American music producer and DJ from Los Angeles. The son of NBA player Walt Hazzard, he signed with rapper Dr. Dre's record label, Aftermath Entertainment, as in-house talent in 2001. Since then, he has co-produced the Billboard 200-number one albums Recovery (2010) and The Marshall Mathers LP 2 (2013) by Eminem, I Decided (2017) by Big Sean, Donda (2021) by Kanye West, and Mr. Morale and the Big Steppers (2022) by Kendrick Lamar, among others. Furthermore, he has been credited on the Billboard Hot 100-top 40 singles "The Man" by Aloe Blacc, "Kush" by label boss Dr. Dre, "Survival" by Eminem, and "Hurricane" by West and the Weeknd. As an instrumental artist, he formed the hip hop duo Self Scientific with Chace Infinite in 1994, as well as the group The New Royales in 2008, which includes Liz Rodrigues, Erik Alcock and Chin Injeti.

== Early life ==
DJ Khalil was born in Seattle, Washington, and raised in Los Angeles, California. His father, Walt Hazzard, who later changed his name to Mahdi Abdul-Rahman, was a professional basketball player in the National Basketball Association. At age 13, at a party thrown by his parents, he met Dr. Dre, for whom he would later become a staff producer. Khalil played basketball at the high school and collegiate level, as a point guard at North Hollywood High School and Morehouse College.

== Career ==
Khalil began his career as a disc jockey (DJ), and graduated to producing music. He began creating tracks on the Ensoniq ASR-10 sampler workstation, later working in Propellerhead Reason. He has produced for a several major artists in the hip-hop, R&B and pop genres, including Kanye West, Benny the Butcher, Nasty C, 50 Cent, Pink, the Game, ASAP Rocky, Drake, Eminem, G-Unit, Wale, Usher, Logic, and Guess Who, among others.

== In popular culture ==
His songs are played in an eponymous radio station in the PlayStation Portable and mobile versions of the Rockstar Games title Grand Theft Auto: Chinatown Wars. He produced Bishop Lamont song "City Lights" which appeared in the racing game Midnight Club: Los Angeles, and the Xzibit song "Klack" which appeared in the racing game Juiced. He produced exclusive tracks for EA Sports fighting game Fight Night Champion.
