= Fashawn discography =

This is the discography for American hip hop musician Fashawn.

== Albums ==
=== Studio albums ===
- Boy Meets World (2009)
- The Ecology (2015)

=== Collaborative albums ===
- This Generation (with Murs) (2012)
- All Hail the King (with Sir Veterano) (2021)
- You Owe Us With Interest (with ProducerTrentTaylor) (2024)

=== EPs ===
- FASH-ionably Late (with The Alchemist) (2014)
- Manna (2017)
- FAX (with Marc Spano) (2023)
- Paperboy (with Ramses & T.A. the Handful) (2024)
- Where the Sidewalk Ends (with Cap Kendricks & DJ Access) (2024)

=== Mixtapes ===
- Grizzly City Vol. 1 (2006)
- The Phenom Vol. 1 (2007)
- Grizzly City Vol. 2 (2007)
- The Phenom Vol. 2 (2008)
- One Shot One Kill (presented by Mick Boogie and Terry Urban) (2008)
- Higher Learning Vol. 1 (2008)
- The Antidote (2009)
- Ode To Illmatic (presented by DJ Green Lantern) (2010)
- Grizzly City Vol. 3 (presented by DJ Skee) (2010)
- Higher Learning Vol. 2 (2011)
- Champagne & Styrofoam Cups (2012)

== Guest appearances ==
List of non-single guest appearances, with other performing artists, showing year released and album name
Title	Year	Other artist(s)	Album
"Game Goofy"	2007	Planet Asia, Diego Redd	Jewelry Box Sessions
"Far Left"	2008	Evidence, The Alchemist	The Layover EP
"Buyer's Guide"	2008	Mick Boogie, DJ Treats	Leaders of the New Cool
"Life Is Too Short"	2008	Mick Boogie	The Honor Roll
"Allready"	2009	The Grouch, Mistah F.A.B.	Three Eyes Off the Time
"Let Go (My Life)	2009	Soul Assassins	Soul Assassins: Intermission
"Pulp Fiction Pt. 1"	2009	U-N-I	A Love Supreme
"Because I'm Black"	2009	Statik Selektah	Back 2 Basics (Leaders of the New School)
"Going Back to Cali"	2009	Mick Boogie & DJ Treats	Unbelievable: The Notorious Edition
"7:30"	2009	Chace Infinite	I Would Have Killed This Mixtape
"Relaxation"	2010	J. Cole, Omen	Mixtape for the Ville Pt. 2
"The Coast"	2010	Statik Selektah, Evidence, Kali	100 Proof: The Hangover
"Questions"	2010	Strong Arm Steady, Madlib, Planet Asia	In Search of Stoney Jackson
"Wassup wassup"	2010	Gangrene, Evidence	Gutter Water
"Plead the Fifth"	2010	Zion I, The Grouch	Heroes In the Healing of the Nation
"Bootleg Liquor"	2010	Balance, Thurzday, Mistah F.A.B.	I Do It For Hip-Hop
"Aces High"	2010	Rakaa, Evidence, Defari	Crown of Thorns
"Same Folks"	2010	Evidence	Cats & Dogs
"Winnipeg"	2011	Abstract Artform	His Story In The Making
"Hearing the Melody"	2012	9th Wonder, Skyzoo, King Mez	The Wonder Years
"Mt. Money"	2012	Wiz Khalifa	N/A
"Jeune Prince"	2013	Joke	Tokyo
"Holy Visions"	2013	Zion I	The Vapors
"Banging Sound"	2014	Step Brothers (Evidence & The Alchemist)	Lord Steppington
"Cali Dreamin"	2014	Dag Savage (Exile & Johaz), Co$$	E&J
"Lost in the Crowd"	2014	Bassnectar, Jantsen, Zion I	Noise vs. Beauty
"Hallelujah"	2014	Dilated Peoples, Rapsody, Domo Genesis, Vinnie Paz, Action Bronson	Directors of Photography
"Selfish"	2015	DJ EFN, King Tee, Kurupt	Another Time
"Copycat"	2015	20syl	Motifs II EP
"Pick & Roll"	2022	Fresh Kils, Roshin	In Transit

== Music videos ==
=== As main artist ===
List of music videos, showing year released and director
Title	Year	Director(s)
"F.A.S.H.A.W.N."	2008	Punit Dhesi
"Our Way" (featuring Evidence)	2009	Punit Dhesi
"Sunny CA"	2009	Punit Dhesi
"Life As A Shorty"	2009	Punit Dhesi
"Samsonite Man" (featuring Blu)	2010	Punit Dhesi
"The Ecology / The Score" (featuring Planet Asia)	2010	Punit Dhesi
"Bart Simpson"	2010	Jon Rezonable
"Pass The Cohiba"	2010	Jon Rezonable
"Down That Road" (featuring Sam Hook)	2011	Punit Dhesi
"Big Dreams"	2011	Punit Dhesi
"Skating Down The Block"	2012	Mikhail Sarkhosh
"Generation F"	2012	Mikhail Sarkhosh
"Diamonds And Girls" (featuring K-Young)	2012	Sele
"The Beginning"	2013	Evidence and Punit Dhesi
"Dreams" (featuring Evidence)	2014	Evidence
"Never Waiting In Vein"	2014	Deane Gonzalez
"Guess Who's Back"	2015	Punit Dhesi
"Higher"	2015	Jerome D

=== As featured artist ===
List of music videos, showing year released and director
Title	Year	Director(s)
"The Far Left" (Evidence featuring The Alchemist & Fashawn)	2008	Punit Dhesi
"Pulp Fiction Part 1" (U-N-I featuring Fashawn)	2009	Fredo Tovar & Scott Fleishman
"Same Folks" (Evidence featuring Fashawn)	2011	Punit Dhesi
"1000 Palm Trees" (Omar Aura featuring Fashawn)	2011	Punit Dhesi & Omar Aura
"Slash Gordon" (Murs and Fashawn)	2012	Todd Angkasuwan
"This Generation" (Murs and Fashawn)	2012	Fredo Tovar & Scott Fleishman
"64 Impala" (Murs and Fashawn)	2012	Punit Dhesi
"Copycat"	2015	WILL & GAB / URSIDAE
