= DJ Khalil production discography =

The following list is a discography of production by DJ Khalil, an American hip-hop and R&B record producer. It includes a list of songs produced, co-produced and remixed by year, artist, album and title.

== Singles produced ==
List of singles produced, with selected chart positions and certifications, showing year released and album name
Title	Year	Peak chart positions										Certifications	Album
Title	Year	US	US R&B	US Rap	AUS	CAN	FRA	IRL	NZ	UK	UK R&B	Certifications	Album
"I'll Still Kill" (50 Cent featuring Akon)	2007	95	52	22	—	—	—	28	14	—	—		Curtis
"Love Me No More" (Jim Jones featuring Kobe)	2008	—	103	—	—	—	—	—	—	—	—		Harlem's American Gangster
"Kinda Like a Big Deal" (Clipse featuring Kanye West)	2009	—	119	—	—	—	—	—	—	—	—		Til the Casket Drops
"The One" (Slaughterhouse)	2009	—	—	—	—	—	—	—	—	—	—		Slaughterhouse
"Better on the Other Side" (Game, Chris Brown, Diddy, DJ Khalil, Polow da Don, Mario Winans, Usher and Boyz II Men)	2009	—	113	—	—	—	—	—	—	—	—		non-album single
"Kush" (Dr. Dre featuring Snoop Dogg and Akon)	2010	34	43	11	81	33	46	112	—	57	—	RIAA: Gold	Detox
"Survival" (Eminem)	2013	16	6	4	18	6	19	22	13	22	4	RIAA: 2× Platinum; BVMI: Gold	The Marshall Mathers LP 2
"The Man" (Aloe Blacc)	2013	8	5	—	10	14	23	4	5	1	1	RIAA: Platinum; ARIA: Platinum; BPI: Gold; RMNZ: Gold	Lift Your Spirit
"Cadillactica" (Big K.R.I.T.)	2014	—	—	—	—	—	—	—	—	—	—		Cadillactica
"Something to Believe In" (Fashawn featuring Nas and Aloe Blacc)	2015	—	—	—	—	—	—	—	—	—	—		The Ecology
"Kings Never Die" (Eminem featuring Gwen Stefani)	2015	80	23	19	94	53	—	—	—	—	27	RIAA: Gold	Music from and Inspired by the Motion Picture Southpaw
"The Matrimony" (Wale featuring Usher)	2015	70	17	—	—	—	—	—	—	—	—	RIAA: Gold	The Album About Nothing
"Black Spiderman" (Logic featuring Damian Lemar Hudson)	2017	87	46	—	—	80	—	—	—	—	—	RIAA: Gold	Everybody
"East Coast" (ASAP Ferg featuring Remy Ma)	2017	—	—	—	—	—	—	—	—	—	—		non-album single
"Mic Jack" (Big Boi featuring Adam Levine, Scar and Sleepy Brown)	2017	—	—	—	—	—	—	—	—	—	—		Boomiverse
"—" denotes a recording that did not chart or was not released in that territory.

== 1998 ==
=== Pyro ===
- "Propaganda /bw Status Quotient" (12 Inch single)

== 2000 ==
=== Self Scientific - The Self Science ===
- Entire Album

=== Planet Asia - 20,000 Leagues Under The Street ===
- "It's On"

=== Ras Kass - Revenge of the Spit ===
- "Fire Wit Fire" (featuring Jay 211 & Strong Arm Steady)

=== DJ Muggs - Soul Assassins II ===
- "Millennium Thrust" (featuring Self Scientific)

== 2001 ==
=== Ras Kass - Van Gogh ===
- "Kiss U" (featuring Sideline)
- "Van Gogh"

== 2002 ==
=== Ras Kass - Goldyn Child ===
- "Kiss of Death"

== 2003 ==
=== G-Unit - Beg For Mercy ===
- "Lay You Down"

=== Keith Murray - He's Keith Murray ===
- "Candi Bar"

=== Raekwon - The Lex Diamond Story ===
- "Ice Cream Part 2"

== 2004 ==
=== Apathy - Where's Your Album?!! ===
- "Doe For Clothes"

=== DJ Muggs - The Last Assassin ===
- "Jealousy" (featuring Chace Infinite)

=== Phil da Agony - The Aromatic Album ===
- "Promises"
- "Thousand Words"
- "I Can't Believe"
- "For the City"

=== Raptile - Classic Material ===
- "Make Y'all Bounce" (featuring Xzibit & Strong Arm Steady)

=== Xzibit - Weapons of Mass Destruction ===
- "Crazy Ho" (featuring Strong Arm Steady)
- "Beware of Us" (featuring Strong Arm Steady)
- "Judgement Day"
- "Klack"

== 2005 ==
=== Self Scientific - Change ===
- Entire Album

=== Cypress Hill - Greatest Hits from the Bong ===
- "The Only Way"

=== Living Legends - Classic ===
- "Brand New"
- "Never Fallin'"

=== Talib Kweli - Right About Now: The Official Sucka Free Mix CD ===
- "Two & Two"

=== Tony Yayo - Thoughts of a Predicate Felon ===
- "I'm So High"

=== Various artists - Music from and Inspired by The Motion Picture Get Rich or Die Tryin' ===
- "We Both Think Alike" (50 Cent featuring Olivia)

=== LMNO - P's and Q's ===
- "Clutch"
- "Disguises"

=== SonGodSuns - Over the Counter Culture ===
- "Big Beat Walkthrough"
- "I Didn't Mean to Touch Your Hand"

=== Sway & King Tech - Back 2 Basics ===
- "Better Days"

== 2006 ==
=== Naledge - Will Rap for Food ===
- "Cold Outside"
- "Jook It"

=== Xzibit - Full Circle ===
- "Poppin' Off" (featuring DJ Quik & King Tee)

=== The Game - Doctor's Advocate ===
- "Da Shit"
- "My B****" (Leftover track)

=== Jay-Z - Kingdom Come ===
- "I Made It"

=== Mitchy Slick - Urban Survival Syndrome ===
- "Mitchy Slick"
- "Superstar (Amnesia)" (featuring WC)
- "Triumphant Gangster" (featuring Strong Arm Steady)
- "U.S.S."

=== Mos Def - True Magic ===
- "Dollar Day (Surprise, Surprise)"

=== Sinful aKa El Pecador - Behind 16 Bars (Hosted By DJ Warrior) ===
- "Polvo Maldito"
- "The Essence" (featuring Sick Jacken & Chace Infinite)

== 2007 ==
=== Bishop Lamont - Nigger Noize ===
- "Super Freak"
- "Hood Psalm"

=== Bishop Lamont - The Pope Mobile ===
- "Personal Chauffeur" (featuring Vanessa Marquez)

Leftover

- "Down" (featuring Kobe) (Beat later given to 50 Cent for "I'll Still Kill")

=== Bishop Lamont & Black Milk - Caltroit ===
- "On Top Now"
- "Inconvenient Truth"

=== Talib Kweli - Eardrum ===
- "Oh My Stars"
- "Hostile Gospel Part 2 (Deliver Me)"

=== Evidence - The Weatherman LP ===
- "All Said & Done" (featuring Kobe)

=== 50 Cent - Curtis ===
- "I'll Still Kill" (featuring Akon)

=== X-Clan - Return From Mecca ===
- "Voodoo"
- "3rd Eyes on Me"

=== Taje - Hot Box: The Second Hit ===
- "Shots Fired"

=== Strong Arm Steady - Deep Hearted ===
- "Bloody Money"(featuring Stix Izza, PNB & Jellyroll)
- "Come and Get Me" (featuring Ina Williams)
- "Wreckless Words"

== 2008 ==
=== Jim Jones - Harlem's American Gangster ===
- "Love Me No More" (featuring Kobe)

=== Nas - The Nigger Tape ===
- "Esco Let's Go"

=== Bun B - II Trill ===
- "Another Soldier"

=== The New Royales ===
- "Posers" (featuring Jay Electronica)

=== Bishop Lamont - The Confessional ===
- "City Lights" (featuring Eric of The New Royales)
- "Send a Nigga Home" (featuring Denaun Porter)
- "Can't Figure It Out" (featuring Eric of The New Royales)

=== Strong Arm Steady ===
- "Night After Night (Stripper Pole)" (featuring Kobe Honeycutt)

=== Indef - The Project ===
- "End Of The World" (featuring Yumeki)

=== Self Scientific ===
- "Everywhere I Go" (featuring The Game & Talib Kweli)
- "For the J's" (featuring Krondon & Phil da Agony)

=== Hot Dollar ===
- "Night Life (We Up In the Club)" (featuring Kobe Honeycutt)

=== Krondon ===
- "A Million"

=== Chino XL ===
- "I'm Coming"
- "Warning"
- "Mama Told Me"

== 2009 ==
=== DJ Drama - Gangsta Grillz: The Album (Vol. 2) ===
- "Yacht Music" (featuring Nas, Willie the Kid, Scarface & Marsha Ambrosius)

=== T.I. ===
- "This Is Detox (I Am Hip Hop)" (featuring Kobe) [Dr. Dre Detox Demo]

=== Clipse - Til the Casket Drops ===
- "Kinda Like a Big Deal" (featuring Kanye West)
- "There Was A Murder" (featuring Kobe)
- "Footsteps" (featuring Kobe)

=== Bishop Lamont ===
- "If You Don't Know The Code" (featuring Kobe)

=== Cashis - The Art of Dying ===
- "Jus Anutha Day"

=== Defari - Work Hard, Play Harder ===
- "Show Some Luv"

=== The Game ===
- "Better on the Other Side" (featuring Diddy, Chris Brown, Polow da Don, Mario Winans, Usher & Boyz II Men)

=== Self Scientific ===
- "It's On"
- "Jetski"

=== Slaughterhouse - Slaughterhouse ===
- "The One" (featuring The New Royales)
- "Cuckoo"

=== Fabolous - Loso's Way ===
- "Imma Do It" (featuring Kobe)
- "Never Let It Go" (featuring Keys)

=== 50 Cent - Before I Self Destruct ===
- "Could've Been You" (featuring R. Kelly)

=== Pitbull - Rebelution ===
- "Can't Stop Me Now" (featuring The New Royales)

=== Drake - So Far Gone EP ===
- "Fear"

=== Bishop Lamont & Indef - Team America: F*ck Yeah ===
- "The Big Payback"

== 2010 ==
=== Cypress Hill - Rise Up ===
- "Pass the Dutch" (featuring Evidence & The Alchemist)
- "Take My Pain" (featuring Everlast)
- "Strike the Match" (co-produced with DJ Muggs)

=== Kida - The Endemic ===
- "Street Music"
- "Wanna Be's" (featuring Kobe)
- "Eulogy"

=== Roc C - Scapegoat ===
- "Turn It Up" (featuring Illa J)

=== Eminem - Recovery ===
- "Talkin' 2 Myself" (featuring Kobe)
- "Won't Back Down" (featuring Pink)
- "25 to Life"
- "Almost Famous"

=== Laws - 4:57 ===
- "Hold You Down"

=== Xzibit - MMX ===
- "Gotta Get 'Em" (featuring Kobe)

=== DJ Muggs & Ill Bill - Kill Devil Hills ===
- "Luciferian Imperium" (co-produced with DJ Muggs)

=== Redman - Reggie ===
- "Def Jammable"

=== Hot Dollar ===
- "I Promise You" (co-produced by Dr. Dre)

=== M.E.D. - Bang Ya Head ===
- "West Iz Back"

=== Game - Brake Lights ===
- "Trading Places" (featuring Snoop Dogg)

=== Dr. Dre - Detox ===
- "Kush" (featuring Snoop Dogg & Akon)
- "Die Hard" (featuring Eminem)

=== Self Scientific ===
- "Peaceful" (featuring Freddie Gibbs & Krondon)

=== Chin - D'Tach ===
- "Separated" (co-produced with Chin Injeti)
- "Mask on My Face (Remix)"

== 2011 ==
=== Raekwon - Shaolin vs. Wu-Tang ===
- "Rock' N Roll" (featuring Ghostface Killah, Jim Jones & Kobe)
- "Rock' N Roll (Remix)" (featuring DJ Khaled, Game, Busta Rhymes & Pharrell Williams)

=== Strong Arm Steady - Arms & Hammers ===
- "Klack Or Get Klacked"
- "Gangsta’s" (featuring Kobe)
- "When Darkness Falls" (featuring Marsha Ambrosius)

=== Joell Ortiz - Free Agent ===
- "Cocaine"

=== Snoop Dogg - Doggumentary ===
- "I Don't Need No Bitch" (featuring Devin the Dude & Kobe)

=== Game - The R.E.D. Album ===
- "Drug Test" (featuring Dr. Dre, Snoop Dogg & Sly)
- "Ricky"

=== New Boyz - Too Cool To Care ===
- "Tough Kids" (featuring Sabi)

=== Bad Meets Evil - Hell: The Sequel ===
- "Echo"

=== Thurzday - L.A. Riot ===
- "Two Clips" (featuring Kobe)
- "Riot" (featuring Black Thought)

=== DJ Khaled - We the Best Forever ===
- "Rock' N Roll (Remix)" (featuring Raekwon, Game, Busta Rhymes & Pharrell Williams)

=== Professor Green - At Your Inconvenience ===
- "Nightmares" (featuring Royce da 5'9" & Kobe)

=== 50 Cent - The Big 10 ===
- "Shootin' Guns" (featuring Kidd Kidd)

=== Rapper Big Pooh - Dirty Pretty Things ===
- "5.13.11"
- "Make It Thru" (featuring Kobe Honeycutt & Joe Scudda)

== 2012 ==
=== Pink - The Truth About Love ===
- "Here Comes the Weekend" (featuring Eminem)

=== Lecrae - Gravity ===
- "Mayday" (featuring Big K.R.I.T. & Ashthon Jones)

=== Skyzoo - A Dream Deferred ===
- "Realization" (featuring Jared Evan)
- "The Rage of Roemello"

=== Kendrick Lamar - good kid, m.A.A.d city ===
- "County Building Blues"

=== Bo da Goodfella - Drama Tracks ===
- "Live from the Garden" (featuring Mr. Crooks)

== 2013 ==
=== KRDN - Everything's Nothing ===
- "Lean on Me" (featuring Kobe)

=== Self Scientific ===
- "Mercy" (featuring Kobe)
- "Willie Lynchin"

=== Eminem - The Marshall Mathers LP 2 ===
- "Survival" (featuring Liz Rodrigues)

=== Bun B - Trill OG: The Epilogue ===
- "No Competition" (featuring Raekwon & Kobe)

=== Dom Kennedy - Get Home Safely ===
- "If It Don't Make Money" (featuring Skeme)

== 2014 ==
=== Aloe Blacc - Lift Your Spirit ===
- "Wake Me Up"
- "The Man"
- "Soldier in the City"
- "Here Today"
- "Lift Your Spirit"
- "Red Velvet Seat"
- "Can You Do This"
- "Eyes of a Child"

=== Logic - Under Pressure ===
- 02. "Soul Food" (co-produced with Alkebulan & 6ix)

=== Big K.R.I.T. - Cadillactica ===
- 04. "Cadillactica" (produced with DJ Dahi)

== 2015 ==
=== Fashawn - The Ecology ===
- 03. "Something to Believe In" (featuring Nas & Aloe Blacc)

=== Wale - The Album About Nothing ===
- 13. "The Matrimony" (featuring Usher)

=== ASAP Rocky - At. Long. Last. ASAP ===
- 01. "Holy Ghost" (featuring Joe Fox)

=== Various Artists - Southpaw (Music from and Inspired By the Motion Picture) ===
- 02. "Kings Never Die" (Eminem featuring Gwen Stefani)
- 03. "Beast (Southpaw Remix)" (Rob Bailey & The Hustle Standard featuring Busta Rhymes, KXNG CROOKED & Tech N9ne)

=== Dr. Dre - Compton ===
- 05. "All in a Day's Work" (featuring Anderson .Paak & Marsha Ambrosius, produced with DJ Dahi)

=== The Game - The Documentary 2.5 ===
- 09. "Intoxicated" (featuring Deion)
- 15. "Moment of Violence" (featuring King Mez, JT & Jon Connor, produced with Mike & Keys)

=== Raury - All We Need ===
- 7. "Peace Prevail"

=== Horseshoe Gang - Knocking On Raps Door ===
- 01. "Fist Pump Music"

== 2016 ==
=== Anderson .Paak - Malibu ===
- 02. "Heart Don't Stand a Chance"
- 12. "Your Prime"

=== BJ the Chicago Kid - In My Mind ===
- 02. "Man Down" (featuring Buddy & Constantine) (produced with Mike & Keys)

=== French Montana - Wave Gods ===
- 04. "Figure It Out" (featuring Kanye West & Nas) (produced with Rick Steel)

=== Royce da 5'9" - Layers ===
- 09. "Flesh"
- 11. "Misses" (featuring K. Young)

=== ASAP Ferg - Always Strive and Prosper ===
- 01. "Rebirth" (produced with Clams Casino)
- 05. "Psycho" (produced with Clams Casino)
- 11. "Beautiful People" (featuring Chuck D & Mama Ferg) (produced with Clams Casino)
- 18. "Grandma"

=== Bishop Lamont - The Reformation G.D.N.I.A.F.T. ===
- 01. "Intro - Then You Die" (featuring MOT)
- 02. "Found a Way Out" (featuring Lord Finesse & Liz Rodriguez)
- 05. "Shoot Em Up" (featuring Caps & Prius Gang)
- 08. "Lord In Heaven" (featuring Kobe Killa)
- 16. "Devil In My Way" (featuring Daniel Seef & Lauren Pardini)

=== Nipsey Hussle - Slauson Boy 2 ===
- 00. "Ocean Views"
- 00. "One Hunnit"

== 2017 ==
=== Joey Bada$$ - All-Amerikkkan Bada$$ ===
- 01. "Good Morning Amerikkka"
- 02. "For My People" - co-produced with 1-900
- 12. "Amerikkkan Idol"

=== Guess Who - Un Anonim Celebru ===
- 01. "Un Anonim Celebru"

=== ASAP Ferg ===
- "East Coast" - co-produced with Tariq Beats

=== ASAP Ferg - Still Striving ===
- 12. "East Coast (Remix)" (featuring Busta Rhymes, ASAP Rocky, Dave East, French Montana, Rick Ross and Snoop Dogg) - co-produced with Tariq Beats

=== Big Boi - Boomiverse ===
- "Mic Jack" (featuring Adam Levine, Scar and Sleepy Brown) - co-produced with DJ Dahi

=== Logic - Everybody ===
- 08. "Mos Definitely" - co-produced with C-Sick
- 12. "Black Spiderman" (featuring Damian Lemar Hudson) - co-produced with Logic and 6ix

=== Ledisi - Let Love Rule ===
- 02. "Shot Down"

=== Lecrae - All Things Work Together ===
- 08. "Lucked Up” (feat. Nija) - co-produced with Mike & Keys and Tariq Beats

=== Big K.R.I.T. - 4eva Is a Mighty Long Time ===
- Disc One - 10. "Aux Cord"
- Disc Two - 01. "Justin Scott"
- Disc Two - 11. "Bury Me in Gold"

=== Eminem - Revival ===
- 18. "Castle"

== 2018 ==
=== SiR - November ===
- 01. "Gone"
- 09. "Better"

=== Joey Purp - QUARTERTHING ===
- 02. "Godbody Pt. 2" (featuring RZA)

=== Nick Grant - Dreamin' Out Loud ===
- 14. "The Ode" (featuring Sonyae Elise)

=== Payroll Giovanni & Cardo - Big Bossin Vol. 2 ===
- "5's And 6's" (Produced With Cardo)

=== Nipsey Hussle - Victory Lap ===
- 02. "Rap Niggas" - co-produced with Mike & Keys and Rance
- 09. "Succa Proof" (featuring Konshens & J-Black) - co-produced with Mike & Keys and Rance

=== Logic - Bobby Tarantino II ===
- 06. "Indica Badu" (featuring Wiz Khalifa) - co-produced with 6ix and Kevin Randolph
- 10. "State of Emergency" (featuring 2 Chainz) - co-produced with Tariq Beats and Vontae Thomas

=== Big K.R.I.T - TDT ===
- 02. "Learned From Texas" - co-produced with Tariq Beats

=== Various Artists - Spider-Man: Into the Spider-Verse (soundtrack) ===
- 12. "Elevate" - (featuring Denzel Curry, YBN Cordae, SwaVay and Trevor Rich)

== 2019 ==
=== Samm Henshaw ===
- "Rise" (from the Godfather of Harlem soundtrack)

=== Celine Dion - Courage ===
- 14. "How Did You Get Here" (co-writer only)
