= Kobe (singer) =

American singer

- Also known as: Brooks Honeycutt; Kobe Killa; Kobe Honeycutt
- Born: Brian Honeycutt; Chicago, Illinois, U.S.
- Genres: R&B; soul; hip hop soul
- Occupations: Singer; songwriter
- Instrument: Vocals
- Years active: 2005–present
- Label: SMH Entertainment

Brian Honeycutt, better known by his stage name Kobe (or Kobe Honeycutt), is an American R&B singer and songwriter from Chicago, Illinois. He is perhaps best known for his guest performances on songs by American rapper Eminem—including 2010's "Talkin' 2 Myself" and "Cinderella Man", and 2014's "Die Alone"—as well as songs produced by DJ Khalil.

== Musical career ==
In 2007, Honeycutt wrote the refrain for 50 Cent and Akon's "I'll Still Kill", released as the fourth single from 50 Cent's third album Curtis (2007). In 2010, Honeycutt co-wrote Dr. Dre's "Kush", which features Snoop Dogg and Akon, and reached the Top 40 of the US Billboard Hot 100 chart. Also in 2010, Honeycutt was featured on Eminem's seventh album Recovery, on the song "Talkin' 2 Myself". In 2011, Honeycutt won a Grammy Award for Best Rap Album for his contributions on Recovery. In July 2013, Honeycutt released a song titled "G on It".

== Discography ==
=== EPs ===
List of extended-plays, with selected details
Title	Details
Ghetto Thrilla	Released: October 30, 2016; Label: SMH Entertainment; Format: Digital download

=== Singles ===
As lead artist

List of singles by title, year, peak chart positions, and album
Title	Year	Peak chart positions		Album
Title	Year	US	R&B	Album
"Rock n Roll" (with Raekwon, Ghostface Killah and Jim Jones)	2011	–	—	Shaolin vs. Wu-Tang
"G on It"	2013	–	—	non-album single
"You Already Know"	2015	–	—	Ghetto Thrilla
"The Other Side" (with Kail Problems and DJ Hoppa)	2023	–	—	non-album single
"—" denotes releases that did not chart or receive certification.

As featured artist

List of singles by title, year, peak chart positions, and album
Title	Year	Peak chart positions		Album
Title	Year	US	R&B	Album
"Love Me No More" (Jim Jones featuring Kobe)	2008	–	103	Harlem's American Gangster
"Rider" (Young Kidd featuring Kobe)	2010	–	—	10x10
"On These Streets" (Winnipeg's Most featuring Kobe)	2010	–	—	Winnipeg's Most
"Back Against the Wall" (Belly featuring Kobe)	2011	–	—	Sleepless Nights
"Where the Pretty Girls At" (Too $hort featuring Kobe)	2011	–	—	non-album single
"Survive" (Mistah F.A.B. featuring Kendrick Lamar, Crooked I and Kobe Honeycutt)	2016	–	—	Son of a Pimp Part 2
"—" denotes releases that did not chart or receive certification.

=== Other charted songs ===
Title	Year	Peak chart positions			Certifications	Album
Title	Year	US	CAN	UK	Certifications	Album
"Talkin' 2 Myself" (Eminem featuring Kobe)	2010	88	97	148	RIAA: Gold	Recovery

=== Guest appearances ===
List of non-single guest appearances, with other performing artists, showing year released and album name
Title	Year	Album	Artist(s)
"It Ain't My Fault"	2006	Urban Survival Syndrome	Mitchy Slick, Tiny Doo
"All Said & Done"	2007	The Weatherman LP	Evidence
"Down"	2007	—N/a	Bishop Lamont
"Circle Gang Anthem"	2008	Block Obama II: COB (Circle of Bosses)	Crooked I
"Another Soldier"	2008	II Trill	Bun B, Mddl Fngz
"Night Life (We Up in the Club)"	2008	—N/a	Hot Dollar
"Through & Through"	2008	The Growth	Joe Budden
"Night After Night"	2009	Clinton Sparks & Talib Kweli Present: Gang Mentality	Strong Arm Steady
"U Don't Want It"	2009	The Leak: Mixtape Volume 4	One-2
"Wanna See 'Em Buss"	2009	Category F5	Twista, Liffy Stokes
"There Was a Murder"	2009	Til the Casket Drops	Clipse
"Footsteps"	2009	Til the Casket Drops	Clipse
"Imma Do It"	2009	Loso's Way	Fabolous
"I Need Mo"	2009	Fast Life	Paul Wall
"Gotta Get Em'"	2009	Serving the Streets	Xzibit
"My Last"	2009	Westside Slaughterhouse	Crooked I, Cashis
"Money in My Hand"	2009	I Would Have Killed This	Chace Infinite
"The Path"	2009	I Would Have Killed This	Chace Infinite
"This Is Detox (I Am Hip Hop)"	2009	—N/a	T.I.
"Talkin' 2 Myself"	2010	Recovery	Eminem
"Funeral Service Music"	2010	There Is No Competition 2: The Funeral Service	Fabolous, Paul Cain, Red Café, Willie the Kid
"Out of the Ghetto"	2010	Donnie G: Don Gorilla	Sheek Louch
"Wanna Be's"	2010	The Endemic	Kida
"Gotta Get Em"	2010	MMX	Xzibit
"Shotty"	2010	—N/a	L.E.P. Bogus Boys
"No Time to Relax"	2010	A Good Investment	Pete G, Cashis
"Don't Judge Me"	2010	Watching Me Closely	Trump Gees
"Gangsta's"	2011	Arms & Hammers	Strong Arm Steady
"I Came Up"	2011	Late at Night	Na Palm
"Nightmares"	2011	At Your Inconvenience	Professor Green, Royce da 5'9"
"I Don't Need No Bitch"	2011	Doggumentary	Snoop Dogg, Devin the Dude
"Make It Thru"	2011	Dirty Pretty Things	Rapper Big Pooh, Joe Scudda
"Just Chill"	2011	Give the Drummer Some	Travis Barker, Beanie Sigel, Bun B
"City of Dreams"	2011	Give the Drummer Some	Travis Barker, Clipse
"Two Clips"	2011	L.A. Riot	Thurzday
"All in My Head"	2012	A Loose Quarter	Joe Budden, Royce da 5'9"
"Living to Die"	2012	Champagne & Styrofoam Cups	Fashawn
"Cats and Dogs"	2012	California Republic	The Game
"And She Don't Even Know"	2012	Psalm 82:V6	Crooked I
"In the Zone"	2012	Destiny	One-2
"The Code"	2012	The Layover	Bishop Lamont
"Broken Record"	2012	—N/a	Ill Camille
"This Life"	2013	My Guy Mars	Mars
"Buy You Something"	2013	My Guy Mars	Mars
"No Competition"	2013	My Guy Mars	Mars
"No Competition"	2013	Trill OG: The Epilogue	Bun B, Raekwon
"Have Mercy"	2013	—N/a	Self Scientific
"All in My Head"	2013	No Love Lost	Joe Budden, Royce da 5'9"
"Lean on Me"	2013	Everything's Nothing	KRNDN
"EN"	2013	Everything's Nothing	KRNDN
"Lay Low"	2013	Tha influence (East Coast Edition)	Scoe
"Swisha Suite"	2013	Tha Influence 2: X-Mas Treez	Scoe
"Crazy"	2013	Restless	YP
"I Don't Know"	2014	Dream. Zone. Achieve	Smoke DZA
"She Don't Love You"	2014	Tha Influence Album	Scoe, K-Young
"Crowned"	2014	Crowned	Kent Money
"Go Girl"	2014	The M.A.F.E. Project	BJ the Chicago Kid
"Everybody Ain't Kings"	2014	Zero Gravity II	King Los, Devin Cruise
"Hard Time"	2014	Zero Gravity II	King Los, Mark Battles & Shanica Knowles
"I Just Wanna"	2014	The County Hound 2	Cashis
"Die Alone"	2014	Shady XV	Eminem
"4Ever"	2015	Slappin the Mixtape	SINO
"Back in the Day"	2015	—N/a	Scoe, Kendrick Lamar
"Lord in Heaven"	2016	The Reformation G.D.N.I.A.F.T.	Bishop Lamont
"The Come Up"	2016	Testimonial Game	Six2
"Strains"	2016	Packs	Berner
"Into the Night"	2017	Antihero Vol. 2	Nacho Picasso, Mistah F.A.B.

== Awards and nominations ==
=== Grammy Awards ===
Year	Nominated work	Award	Result
2011	Recovery (as featured artist and songwriter)	Best Rap Album	Won
