= Miles: From an Interlude Called Life =

Studio album by Blu & Exile
- Released: July 17, 2020
- Recorded: 2017–2020
- Genre: Hip-hop
- Length: 95:29
- Label: Dirty Science; Fat Beats
- Producer: Exile

Blu & Exile chronology
True & Livin' (2019)	Miles: From an Interlude Called Life (2020)	Love (the) Ominous World (2024)

Singles from Miles
- 1. "True & Livin'" Released: May 2, 2019; 2. "Spread Sunshine" Released: May 24, 2019; 3. "Miles Davis" Released: May 20, 2020; 4. "Roots of Blue" Released: June 10, 2020; 5. "The Feeling" Released: July 8, 2020

Professional ratings
Review scores
Source	Rating
Pitchfork	7.7/10
Anthony Fantano	9/10

Miles: From an Interlude Called Life (or Miles for short) is the third studio album by American hip-hop duo Blu & Exile. It was released on 17 July 2020 through Dirty Science Records and is their first full-length album since their 2012 album Give Me My Flowers While I Can Still Smell Them. The release coincides with the 13th anniversary of their debut album Below the Heavens.

== Background ==
Blu & Exile began work on a new album in 2015, originally a trap album sending each other beats and verses through e-mail. This album was ultimately scrapped in 2017 as they decided that it did not feel genuine towards their fanbase. Going back to their roots, they started meeting up in-person again and working on Miles. Around 40 songs were made and the 20 that they thought best suited the record were picked.

On May 2, 2019, the duo released their first single "True & Livin'", announcing the True & Livin' EP to release May 24, 2019. The duo supported the rollout of their EP with the True & Livin' tour which began on May 2, 2019 and ended June 7, 2019. On May 20, 2020, they released their single "Miles Davis" and announced their album titled Miles to release on July 17, 2020. Two other singles titled "Roots of Blue" and "The Feeling" were released in the leadup to the album release.

== Track listing ==
All tracks are written by Blu and all tracks produced by Exile.

No.	Title	Length
1.	"Blue"	2:18
2.	"When the Gods Meet" (featuring Ishe)	3:03
3.	"True & Livin'"	4:03
4.	"Miles Davis"	4:34
5.	"The Feeling" (featuring Jacinto Rhines)	7:35
6.	"Music Is My Everything" (featuring Choosey and Jimetta Rose)	6:11
7.	"Bright as Stars" (featuring Aceyalone, Iman Omari and Ishe)	5:48
8.	"Blue as I Can Be"	5:03
9.	"You Ain't Never Been Blue"	5:04
10.	"Miles Away" (featuring C.S. Armstrong)	5:07
11.	"Troubled Water" (featuring Gappy Ranks)	4:54
12.	"Roots of Blue" (featuring Jacinto Rhines)	9:19
13.	"African Dream" (featuring Gappy Ranks and Aloe Blacc)	4:22
14.	"Requiem of Blue" (featuring Fashawn)	3:26
15.	"The American Dream" (featuring Miguel and The Last Artful, Dodgr)	4:37
16.	"Dear Lord" (featuring Jimetta Rose)	3:12
17.	"To the Fall, But Not Forgotten"	4:33
18.	"All the Blues"	3:10
19.	"Spread Sunshine"	2:47
20.	"The End" (featuring Dag Savage, Cashus King & ADAD)	6:15
Total length:		95:29

== Personnel ==
- Blu - vocals, writer
- Exile - producer, cuts and scratches
- Eddie Sancho - mixing
- Kelly Hibbert - mastering
- B+ - photography
- Chris Hund - vinyl design
