= Give Me My Flowers While I Can Still Smell Them =

Studio album by Blu & Exile
- Released: September 4, 2012
- Recorded: 2009
- Studio: The DirtyScience Labs
- Genre: Hip-hop
- Length: 54:18
- Label: Dirty Science; Fat Beats
- Producer: Exile

Blu & Exile chronology
Below the Heavens (2007)	Give Me My Flowers While I Can Still Smell Them (2012)	Miles: From an Interlude Called Life (2020)

Blu chronology
Johnson&Jonson (2008)	Give Me My Flowers While I Can Still Smell Them (2012)	York (2013)

Exile chronology
4TRK Mind (2011)	Give Me My Flowers While I Can Still Smell Them (2012)	Zip Disks & Floppies (2013)

Give Me My Flowers While I Can Still Smell Them is the second studio album by American hip-hop duo Blu & Exile. Originally recorded in 2009 and leaked online in 2011, it was released through Dirty Science and Fat Beats on September 4, 2012. Recorded at the DirtyScience Labs and produced entirely by Exile, it features guest appearances from Adad, Andy Allo, Black Spade, Fashawn, Homeboy Sandman, Jimetta Rose, J. Mitchell, and Johaz of Dag Savage.

In the United States, the album debuted at number 53 on the Top R&B/Hip-Hop Albums and number 31 on the Heatseekers Albums charts.

Give Me My Flowers While I Can Still Smell Them Instrumentals was released on July 24, 2015 with different cover artwork and unreleased non-album instrumental track "Enough".

== Critical reception ==
Professional ratings
Aggregate scores
Source	Rating
Metacritic	76/100
Review scores
Source	Rating
HipHopDX	3/5
Pitchfork	6.8/10
PopMatters	8/10

Give Me My Flowers While I Can Still Smell Them was met with generally favourable reviews from music critics. At Metacritic, which assigns a normalized rating out of 100 to reviews from mainstream publications, the album received an average score of 76 based on five reviews.

David Amidon of PopMatters wrote: "working with Exile seems to ground Blu, forcing him to examine his self-image and the way the world perceives him. It's just riveting stuff for those who value rap music as a sort of social experiment, and those who've stuck with Blu throughout his whole gonzo period of bandcamps and muddy zshare files ought to feel vindicated by Fat Beats' treatment of this album". Jonah Bromwich of Pitchfork resumed: "though this album is a beautiful, well-executed listen, Blu will only really be fulfilling his potential when he starts looking toward the future again".

In mixed reviews, Phillip Mlynar of HipHopDX found "there's nothing to startle about the music or the lyrics and there's little that isn't coated with a whiff of having heard it all before".

== Track listing ==
No.	Title	Writer(s)	Length
1.	"A Letter"	Johnson Barnes III; Aleksander Manfredi	1:35
2.	"Ease Your Mind"	Barnes III; Manfredi	4:28
3.	"Maybe One Day" (featuring Black Spade)	Barnes III; Veto Lamar Money; Manfredi	3:56
4.	"I Am Jean"	Barnes III; Manfredi	3:14
5.	"O Heaven"	Barnes III; Manfredi	3:19
6.	"More Out of Life" (featuring J. Mitchell)	Barnes III; Jasmine Mitchell; Manfredi	3:54
7.	"The Only One" (featuring Jimetta Rose)	Barnes III; Jimetta Rose Smith; Manfredi	3:35
8.	"Money"	Barnes III; Manfredi	2:49
9.	"Mask Your Soul"	Barnes III; Manfredi	1:54
10.	"Good Morning Neighbor"	Barnes III; Manfredi	2:04
11.	"Growing Pains" (featuring Johaz and Fashawn)	Barnes III; Johaz Bosley; Santiago Leyva; Manfredi	4:08
12.	"Don't Be Jelly"	Barnes III; Manfredi	3:33
13.	"Berries and Juices"	Barnes III; Manfredi	2:09
14.	"The Great Escape" (featuring Homeboy Sandman and Adad)	Barnes III; Angel Del Villar II; Demetrius Barry; Manfredi	3:16
15.	"Seasons"	Barnes III; Manfredi	2:41
16.	"A Man"	Barnes III; Manfredi	4:31
17.	"Cent From Heaven"	Barnes III; Manfredi	3:12
Total length:			54:18

== Personnel ==
- Johnson "Blu" Barnes III — lyrics, vocals, recording, executive producer
- Aleksander "Exile" Manfredi — keyboards solo (track 12), producer, recording, executive producer
- Andy Allo — additional vocals (track 2)
- Veto "Black Spade" Money — vocals (track 3)
- Jasmine Nicole Mitchell — additional vocals (track 6)
- Jimetta Rose Smith — additional vocals (track 7)
- Johaz Bosley — vocals (track 11)
- Santiago "Fashawn" Leyva — vocals (track 11)
- Angel "Homeboy Sandman" Del Villar II — vocals (track 14)
- Demetrius "Adad" Barry — vocals (track 14)
- Cedric "I Ced" Norah — additional vocals (track 16), keyboards (tracks: 3, 5, 16)
- Randall Fisher — flute (tracks: 4, 7, 9), horns (track 4)
- Michael Bergen — keyboards (track 12)
- Frederico Lopez — mixing
- Kenneth Barrientos — mixing (track 2)
- Jose Jurado — mixing (track 11)
- Omar Loya — tracking (track 14)
- Mitch McCarthy — mastering
- Justin Abbink — design
- Theo Jemison — portrait photography

== Charts ==
Chart (2012)	Peak position
US Top R&B/Hip-Hop Albums (Billboard)	53
US Heatseekers Albums (Billboard)	31
