= E&J (album) =

Studio album by Dag Savage
- Released: February 4, 2014
- Genre: Hip-hop
- Length: 50:38
- Label: Dirty Science
- Producer: Exile

E&J is a collaborative studio album by Dag Savage, consisting of American record producer Exile and rapper Johaz. The album was released on February 4, 2014 by the label Dirty Science.

== Critical reception ==
Professional ratings
Review scores
Source	Rating
Exclaim!	6/10
HipHopDX	4/5 stars
RapReviews	8.5/10

Grant Jones of RapReviews ranked the album number 12 in his list of top 20 albums of 2014. Hip Hip Golden Age ranked the album number 139 in their list of top 150 hip-hop albums of the 2010s.

== Track listing ==
No.	Title	Length
1.	"The Beginning"	3:39
2.	"For Oldtimes Sake"	3:45
3.	"Twilight"	2:43
4.	"Bad Trip" (featuring Adad, Gonjasufi and Sahtyre)	4:10
5.	"D.R.U.G.S." (featuring Co$$ and Choosey)	3:51
6.	"Don't Stop" (featuring Blu)	3:07
7.	"Van Gogh" (featuring Choosey)	3:20
8.	"Cali Dreamin" (featuring Co$$, Fashawn and Tiombe Lockhart)	3:28
9.	"F.U.P.M." (featuring M.E.D. and Ras Kass)	3:43
10.	"Milk Box (Remix)"	3:36
11.	"LL Cool J"	2:01
12.	"Wine & Cheese" (featuring Jimetta Rose)	2:45
13.	"Darlin" (featuring Choosey)	2:51
14.	"The Hurt"	2:36
15.	"When It Rains" (featuring Aloe Blacc)	2:57
16.	"The Finish"	2:06
Total length:		50:38
