= Boy Meets World (disambiguation) =

Boy Meets World is an American television sitcom that ran from 1993 to 2000.

Boy Meets World may also refer to:

- Boy Meets World (album), the 2007 debut album by hip-hop artist Fashawn
- The Boy Meets World Tour (2017), the fifth tour of the performer Drake
