= Blu & Exile =

Hip-hop duo

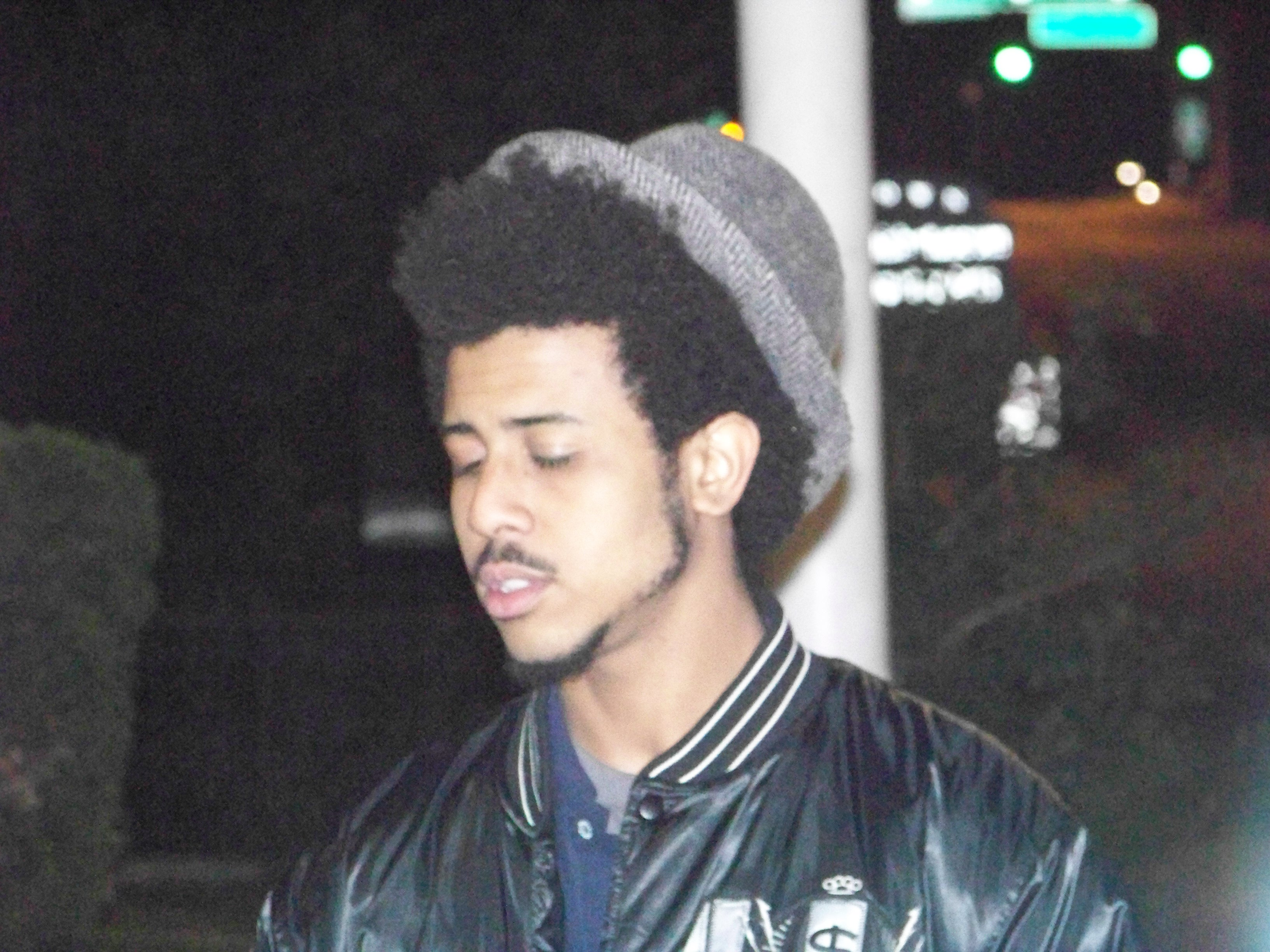
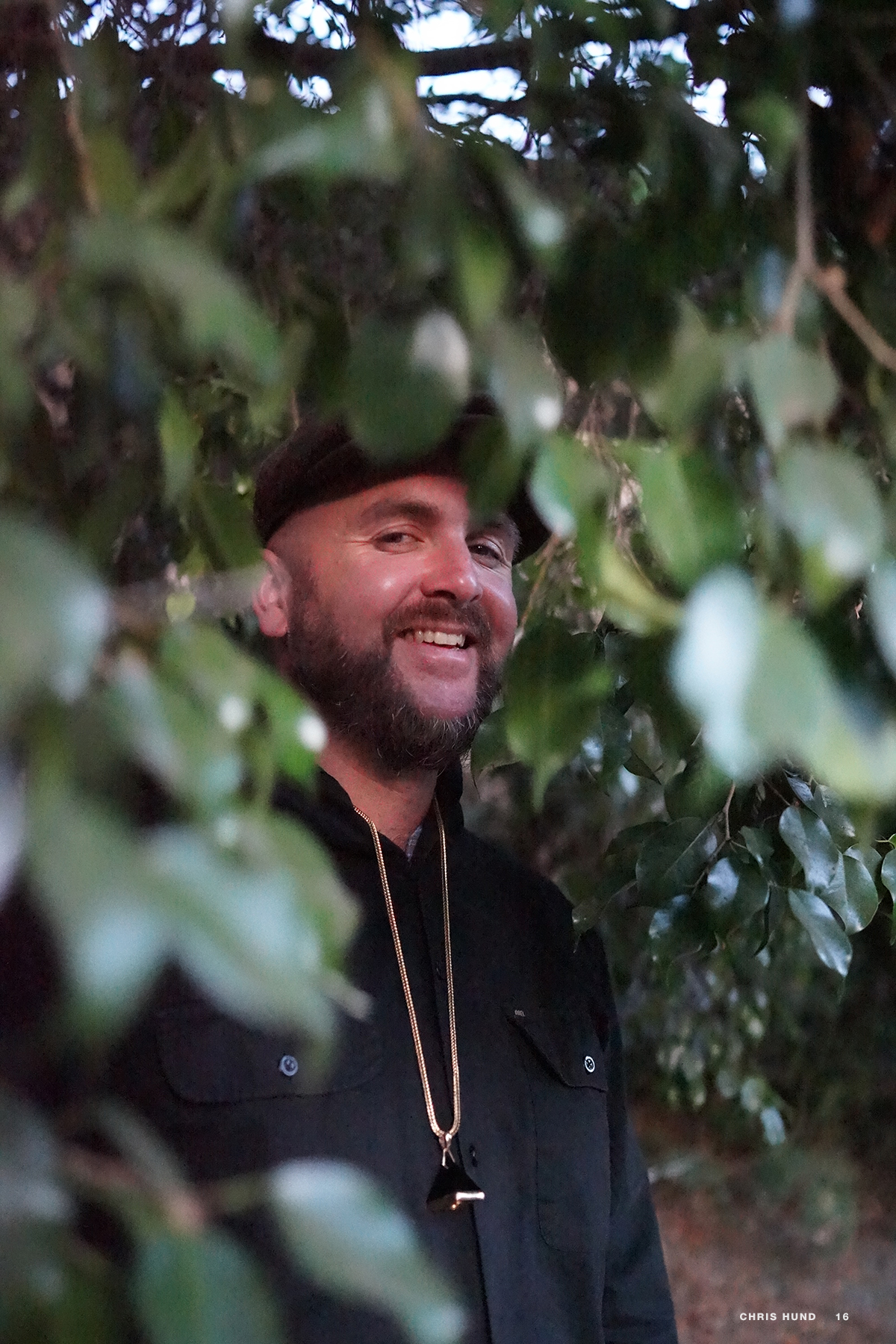

Background information
- Origin: Los Angeles, California, United States
- Genres: Hip-hop
- Years active: 2007–present
- Labels: Sound in Color; Fat Beats; Dirty Science
- Members: Blu; Exile

Blu & Exile are an American hip-hop duo, formed in 2007, composed of rapper Blu and hip-hop producer Exile.

== History ==
Blu and Exile first met in the mid-2000s while Blu was serving as a hype man for various hip-hop groups including Slum Village, Platinum Pied Pipers, and Exile's own group, Emanon. He was personally introduced to Exile through Emanon's other member, Aloe Blacc. In 2007, Blu & Exile released their debut album, Below the Heavens, which was described by XXL as "one of 2007's most celebrated hip-hop releases". In 2012, the duo released their second album, Give Me My Flowers While I Can Still Smell Them. In 2017, the duo released In the Beginning: Before the Heavens, deleted tracks from Below the Heavens. Their next release, the True & Livin' EP was released May 24, 2019. On July 17, 2020, Blu & Exile released their third album, Miles: From An Interlude Called Life (or Miles for short), coinciding with the 13th anniversary of Below the Heavens. The duo released Time Heals Everything on April 20, 2026.

== Discography ==
=== Albums ===
- Below the Heavens (2007)
- Give Me My Flowers While I Can Still Smell Them (2012)
- Miles: From an Interlude Called Life (2020)
- Love (the) Ominous World (2024)
- Time Heals Everything (2026)

=== EPs ===
- Maybe One Day (2012)
- True & Livin (2019)

=== Compilation albums ===
- In the Beginning: Before the Heavens (2017)
