= U-N-I =

American hip hop group

- Origin: Inglewood, Los Angeles and Seattle, Washington
- Genres: Hip hop; trip hop
- Years active: 2006–2011, 2022–present
- Labels: Honor Roll
- Members: Yannick "Thurzday" Koffi; Yonas "Y-O" Semere Michael
- Website: Official Myspace

U-N-I (short for "U-N-I to the Verse") are a hip hop duo from Inglewood, Los Angeles, consisting of Y-O (born Yonas Semere Michael) and Thurzday (born Yannick Koffi).

== History ==
Y-O and Thurzday met in 1999 at St. Bernard High School in Westchester, California. They were originally part of a four-man group, the Rap-Ture Kamp, along with fellow St. Bernard student Ablaze and local producer Unjust Ant. This crew released two mixtapes, Rap-Ture Kamp Unleash, Volume 1 and Jacking Beats. After graduation in 2006 they split from the Kamp and formed U-N-I, the name inspired by The Roots' 1996 album Illadelph Halflife. Thurz stated "To us, it's a first person statement. Myself and Y-O, U-N-I-verse, ain't nobody against us. It also stands for being universal and not being boxed into one sound."

Y-O is the emcee whose name "Yonas" translates to "Soldier" in his native Ethiopian and he moved from Seattle, Washington to Inglewood, California in 1996. He originally rocked a mohican during the prime days of the duo. Thurzday is a descendant of both Côte d'Ivoire and Belize, taking his moniker from his last name "Koffi" which translates in Ghana's native language of Akan to "boy born on Friday."

== Career ==
=== 2007-2008 ===
U-N-I who profess to be die hard sneaker aficionados flipped The Wu-Tang Clan's "C.R.E.A.M" into the 2007 hit song "K.R.E.A.M." (Kicks Rule Everything Around Me) which to date has received 430,000 hits on YouTube. That same year the duo released their satirically titled street album Fried Chicken & Watermelon which contained 14 songs including the single "Beautiful Day" and "Phat Girls," an ode to bigger women. “Beautiful Day” has received over 1.2 million views on YouTube, and garnered international acclaim from as far as the Czech Republic, Belgium and Germany. The duo soon became a staple on the urban and alternative blogosphere and received 5.5 million profile views on Myspace. Subsequently, they were signed by ICM Agency and opened up for artists including Lupe Fiasco, 50 Cent, Mos Def, Talib Kweli, Wale, Ludacris, Busta Rhymes, The Roots and Redman. They were named "Best Breakout LA Artist" at the 2008 MTV Video Music Awards, featured in URB Magazine's “NEXT 100” & “NEXT 1000,” XXL Magazine's “New Kids in Town,” Billboard Magazine's “Acts to Watch,” The Source Magazine's “Unsigned Hype” & “Off the Radar,” Time Out New York's “The Volume,” MTVu's “The Hot Seat,” BET.com's “Rookies of the Year” and ending up on the “SoundBoard” of The Los Angeles Times while serving as the official hosts of MTV's “Sucka Free” - on the strength of their observant, life-affirming rhymes that revolved around everything from limited-edition sneakers to cosmic existentialism and old-school video games to musings on life and actress Lauren London.

In October 2008 their rendition of "Stakes is High" was featured on The Honor Roll Mixtape (DJ Mick Boogie) while the remix to "Beautiful Day" featured Big Pooh and Evidence of Dilated Peoples. In February 2009 to set the precedent for their second album “A Love Supreme” the duo released the mixtape "Before There was Love" (DJ Mick Boogie) featuring collabs with Talib Kweli, Aloe Blacc, Fashawn, Mickey Factz, Evidence, and Kes Kaos.

=== 2009-2010 ===
In February 2009 while promoting the debut LP A Love Supreme they were featured in UK's Dazed & Confused Magazine where music editor Tim Noakes said, “They are the youthful epitome of colour and cadence.” In Summer 2009 they secured a record deal with Mountain Dew’s Green Label Sound for the release of the single “Land of the Kings.” Their music videos for "Beautiful Day," "Soul Hop" “Lately” f/ Miguel, “Windows,” “Black Sky” and “Land of the Kings” all went into rotation on MTV Jams, MTVu, Sucka Free and MTV2. In Fall 2009 they headed out on a successful nationwide tour with Warren G, Kidz in the Hall Curtains and Theo Martins.

In March 2010 they released the follow-up to their LP A Love Supreme 2.0 which contained 5 new tracks as well as a remixes with Evidence, Bun B and Jive Recording R&B Artist Miguel

The duo have been credited with reviving the "true essence" of hip-hop, rejecting the Gangsta rap style that had become common. In 2007 Billboard Magazine said the duo were “born from the ashes of gangsta rap.”

=== 2022-present ===
On May 8, 2022, U-N-I released the single "On Mommas", their first appearance as a duo in eleven years since their appearance on Blu's "Doin' Somethin" in 2011.

== Discography ==
=== Albums and mixtapes ===
Fried Chicken & Watermelon (2007)

1. Introduction (1:23)
2. The Launch (5:20)
3. Soul Hop (3:49)
4. Let Me BE (3:03)
5. The Show 2007 (4:50)
6. Do wit Me (4:06)
7. Let Me Sing for You Skit (1:18)
8. Knock on Wood (4:12)
9. Fat Girl (4:41)
10. The Proposal (4:03)
11. Castlevania (3:55)
12. LapDance (4:07)
13. Beautiful Day (2:27)
14. K.R.E.A.M. (4:49) (Samples C.R.E.A.M. by Wu-Tang Clan & Kick, Push by Lupe Fiasco)

Before There Was Love (2009)

1. Mick Boogie Intro
2. Cali Soul (featuring Shawn Jackson and H.O.P.E.) (prod. by Dibia$e)
3. See LA (featuring Damani) (prod. by Faahz)
4. Cast' Em Out (prod. by Dibia$e)
5. The Press Play Show Interlude Part 1
6. On Tour (featuring Bambu) (prod. by Ro Blvd)
7. Think About It (featuring 6th Sense & Vandalyzm) (prod. by 6th Sense)
8. Half Off (featuring Evidence)
9. Run Son (featuring El Prez, 310, C-San & Casey Veggies) (prod. by Ro Blvd)
10. Stakes is High (prod. by 6th Sense)
11. The Press Play Show Interlude Part 2
12. Beautiful Day (Remix) (featuring Rapper Big Pooh, Evidence, Aloe Blacc, Kes Kaos, Mickey Factz, Fashawn and Theo Martins) (prod. by Dibia$e))
13. Yesterday (prod. by Ski Team)
14. Hey Neighbor (prod. by Ro Blvd)
15. Wildin' (featuring Chen Lo & Tunji) (prod. by Ro Blvd)
16. The Press Play Show Interlude Part 3
17. Castle Vee Re-Up (featuring Black Milk) (prod. by Dibia$e)
18. Arcade Fly Remix (featuring Wildabeast, 6th Sense, Buff1, Donny Goines and Fashawn)
19. Night Nurse (prod. by Cook Classics)
20. Relax (featuring Fashawn) (prod. by FredNukes)
21. Return (featuring Talib Kweli) (prod. by Lee Bannon)
22. Mainstream Consumers (featuring Free Speech & Bambu) (prod. by Ro Blvd)
23. Monster (featuring Shawn Jackson) (prod. by Jaguar Skills)
24. Vitamin B (featuring CurT@!n$) (prod. by Lee Bannon)
25. The Press Play Show Interlude Part 4
26. Start My Day (featuring H.O.P.E.) (prod. by Ro Blvd)
27. Herb (featuring Co$$ & Bad Lucc) (prod. by Ro Blvd)

A Love Supreme (2009)

1. My Life
2. Windows
3. Supreme
4. Hollywood Hiatus
5. Lately
6. Pulp Fiction Part 1 (featuring Fashawn)
7. The Grudge
8. Voltron
9. Stylin
10. Hammertime
11. Calendar Girls
12. Lauren London
13. Black Sky
14. Halftime
15. A Love Supreme

A Love Supreme 2.0 (2010)

1. Supreme 2.0
2. Land of the Kings
3. Hollywood Hiatus
4. The Launch 2.0
5. Lately (featuring Miguel)
6. My Life (featuring Kes Kaos)
7. Calendar Girls
8. Stylin
9. Windows
10. Halftime
11. Pulp Fiction (featuring Fashawn)
12. Pussy (featuring Evidence)
13. The Grudge
14. Land of the Kings (Remix) (featuring Bun B)
15. Voltron
16. HammerTime
17. Lauren London
18. Black Sky
19. A Love Supreme

=== Singles ===
- "Beautiful Day" (2007)
- "Soul Hop" (2008)
- "Hollywood Hiatus (Cool It Now)" (2008)
- "Land of the Kings" (2009)
- "Lately" (featuring Miguel) (2010)
- "On Mommas" (2022)

== See also ==
- Los Angeles hip hop
- Northwest hip hop
