= Exile (producer) =

American rapper

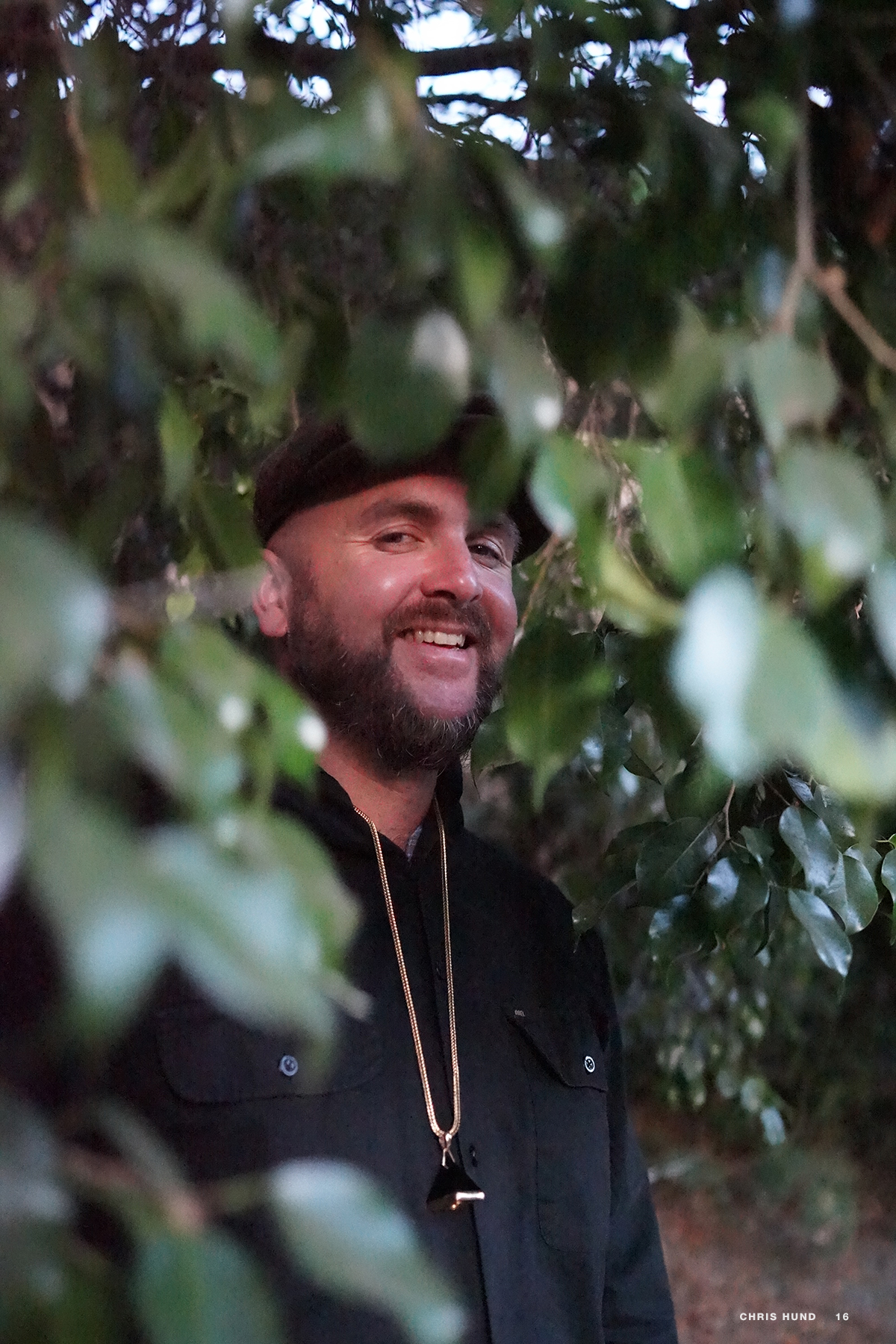

Background information
- Born: Aleksander Thomas Manfredi; May 24, 1977 (age 49)
- Origin: Los Angeles, California, U.S.
- Genres: Alternative hip-hop; underground hip-hop
- Occupations: Record producer; DJ; rapper
- Instruments: Turntable; sampler; MPC
- Years active: 1995–present
- Labels: Dirty Science; Plug Research; Shaman Work; Sound in Color
- Member of: Emanon; Blu & Exile; Dag Savage
- Website: thedirtyscience.com/exile

Aleksander Thomas Manfredi, better known by his stage name Exile, is an American record producer, disc jockey and occasional rapper. Aside from his solo career, he is a member of the musical groups Emanon alongside Aloe Blacc, Blu & Exile, and Dag Savage with Johaz.

== Career ==
Exile's first record appearances were as a member of the hip-hop duo Emanon with the rapper Aloe Blacc. They released various mixtapes beginning in 1995 with "Stretch Marx" before releasing their first album, Anon & On. After 2002, Exile went on to release one more Emanon album, The Waiting Room (2005), a solo album, Dirty Science (2006), and another collaborative effort with the rapper Blu, Below the Heavens (2007). Exile released two more solo albums, Radio in 2009 and 4TRK Mind in 2011. Exile released his second collaborative album with Blu, Give Me My Flowers While I Can Still Smell Them in 2012. He released the instrumental album, Zip Disks & Floppies in 2013. In 2014, he released the album E&J with rapper Johaz. Exile and Blu released their third collaborative album, Miles, in 2020. Miles was ranked #4 on music critic Anthony Fantano's 50 Best Albums of 2020 list.

== Style and influences ==
Exile is known for "coarsely chopped beats" that give off "laid back soulful vibes". He says his influences are the contemporary producers J Dilla, Jon Brion and Madlib.

== Discography ==
=== Studio albums ===
- Dirty Science (2006)
- 4TRK Mind (2011)

=== Instrumental albums ===
- Radio (2009)
- Zip Disks & Floppies (2013)

=== Collaborative albums ===
- Imaginary Friends (with Aloe Blacc as Emanon) (1996)
- The Waiting Room (Emanon) (2005)
- Below the Heavens (Blu & Exile) (2007)
- Boy Meets World (2009) (with Fashawn)
- Give Me My Flowers While I Can Still Smell Them (Blu & Exile) (2012)
- E&J (with Johaz as Dag Savage) (2014)
- Dystopia (Emanon) (2016)
- In the Beginning: Before the Heavens (Blu & Exile) (2017)
- Black Beans (with Choosey) (2019)
- Miles: From an Interlude Called Life (Blu & Exile) (2020)
- Love (the) Ominous World (Blu & Exile) (2024)

=== Remix albums ===
- Radio Bonus (2010)
- Radio AM/FM (2010)

=== Compilation albums ===
- Steps Through Time 1997–2000 (with Aloe Blacc as Emanon) (2001)

=== EPs ===
- Anon and On (with Aloe Blacc as Emanon) (2002)
- Radio AM/FM EP (2010)
- Los Angeles 10/10 (2011) (with Free the Robots)
- The Dag Savage EP (2013) (with Johaz as Dag Savage)
- Furnace EP (Dag Savage) (2018)
- True & Livin (Blu & Exile) (2019)

=== Mixtapes ===
- Salvation (2012) (with Johaz as Dag Savage)
- The Warning Tape (Dag Savage) (2014)

=== Singles ===
- "Time Has Come" (2005)
- "Stay Tuned" (2009)

== Production credits ==
- Styles of Beyond – "Exile (Intro)" – co-produced with DJ Cheapshot from 2000 Fold (1998)
- Deep Rooted – "Urban Soul" from A New Beginning (2004)
- Kardinal Offishall – "Fire and Glory" from Fire and Glory (2005)
- Mobb Deep – "Pearly Gates" from Blood Money (2006)
- Jurassic 5 – "Baby Please" from Feedback (2006)
- Aloe Blacc – "Bilar Remix" (2007)
- Kardinal Offishall – "Graveyard Shift" (2007)
- Soopafly – "That Way" from Bangin Westcoast (2007)
- Flying Lotus – "Infinitum" (2008)
- Asher Roth – "Lazy Afternoon" (2008)
- Fresh Daily – "T.I.T.S. (Two in the Shirt)" from The Gorgeous Killer: In Crimes of Passion (2009)
- Strong Arm Steady – "Give It Up" (2009)
- Deep Rooted – "Closer" from D.E.E.P.R.O.O.T.E.D (2009)
- Blame One – "Street Astrologist", "Disturbed", "Saturday Night Special", "The Word to Say" and "Documentarian" from Days Chasing Days (2009)
- Fashawn – Boy Meets World (2009)
- Open Mike Eagle – "I Rock" from Unapologetic Art Rap (2010)
- Has-Lo – "Face in Disguise" from Conversation B (2011)
- Blu – "Tags" from NoYork! (2011)
- Rakaa – "Human Nature (Now Breathe)" from Crown of Thorns (2011)
- Dannu – "Free" from Virgo Summer (2011)
- Pharoahe Monch – "Evolve" from W.A.R. (We Are Renegades) (2011)
- Big Sean – "Wait for Me" from Finally Famous (2011)
- M.E.D. - "Your Life" from Bang Your Head 3: Special Edition (2011)
- Thirsty Fish – "Director's Cut" from Watergate (2011)
- Freestyle Fellowship – "Step 2 the Side" from The Promise (2011)
- Tanya Morgan – "Together" from You & What Army (2011)
- Snoop Dogg and Wiz Khalifa – "You Can Put It in a Zag But Imma Roll It in a Blunt" from Mac & Devin Go to High School (2011)
- Fashawn – "Hola Santiago" and "Heard It All Before" from Champagne & Styrofoam Cups (2012)
- Homeboy Sandman – "Cops Get Scared of Me" from Chimera EP (2012)
- Luckyiam – "Whatuptho?!" from Time to Get Lucky (2012)
- Chino XL – "Crazy Love" from Ricanstruction: The Black Rosary (2012)
- Dialectrix – "The Satellite" from Satellite (2013)
- 2Mex & Maiselph – "All About Life" and "Wake Up in the Morning" from Like Farther... Like Sun... (2013)
- Muneshine – "Venus & Mars" from In Transit (2014)
- The Grouch & Eligh – "Akfam" from The Tortoise and the Crow (2014)
- Open Mike Eagle – "Dark Comedy Late Show" from A Special Episode Of – EP (2015)
- Open Mike Eagle – "Dark Comedy Late Show – Exile Remix" from Mello Music Group – Persona Compilation (2015)
- Fashawn – The Ecology (2015)
- Denmark Vessey – "Think Happy Thoughts" from Martin Lucid Dream (2015)
- Red Pill – "Porn & Milk" from Day Drunk (2015)
- Stik Figa – "The Ends & Outs" from Central Standard Time (2017)
- Chris Orrick - "Bottom Feeders" from Portraits (2018)
- Open Mike Eagle – "Legendary Iron Hood" and "Happy Wasteland Day" from Brick Body Kids Still Daydream
