= Johaz =

American rapper

- Born: Johaz Bosley
- Origin: San Diego, California, United States
- Genre: Hip-hop
- Occupations: Rapper; songwriter
- Years active: 2002–present
- Formerly of: Dag Savage; Deep Rooted

Johaz Bosley, known simply as Johaz, is an American rapper from San Diego, California. He was a member of the group Deep Rooted. His song "The NBA" was featured on the soundtrack of NBA 2K6. Later he formed Dag Savage with producer Exile. In 2014, they released the album E&J. In 2020, he founded the record label Enivid Music Group.

== Discography ==
=== Solo ===
- Urban Ministry EP (self-released, 2002)

=== Dag Savage (with Exile) ===
- Salvation (Dirty Science, 2012)
- The Dag Savage EP (Dirty Science, 2013)
- The Warning Tape (Dirty Science, 2014)
- E&J (Dirty Science, 2014)
- Furnace EP (Dirty Science, 2018)
