= The Ecology =

Studio album by Fashawn
- Released: February 24, 2015
- Recorded: 2013–14
- Genre: Hip-hop
- Length: 58:30
- Label: Mass Appeal; Sony; RED
- Producer: Nas (exec.); Exile; the Alchemist; DJ Khalil; Beewirks; Quincey Tones; Jo Caleb; ATG

Fashawn chronology
Boy Meets World (2009)	The Ecology (2015)	Manna (2017)

Singles from The Ecology
- 1. "Golden State of Mind" Released: October 21, 2014; 2. "Guess Who's Back" Released: January 27, 2015; 3. "Out the Trunk" Released: February 17, 2015; 4. "Something to Believe In" Released: February 19, 2015

The Ecology is the second studio album by American rapper Fashawn. It was released on February 24, 2015 by Mass Appeal Records — a record label founded by the album's executive producer, American rapper Nas — and Sony Music. Nas also guest appears on the album alongside Aloe Blacc, BJ the Chicago Kid, and Dom Kennedy. The album's production, similar to Fashawn's debut album Boy Meets World, is handled primarily by Exile, with additional contributions by DJ Khalil and the Alchemist.

The title and concept of the album entails exploring the "ecology" of one's environment: the people, objects, and events surrounding one's life, the things that provoke human behavior, how individual choices lead to different paths, and how everyone and everything is ultimately interconnected.

Upon release, The Ecology debuted among the top 10 most downloaded albums on the iTunes Hip-Hop Chart. The album was met with widespread acclaim from critics, who praised its heartfelt lyricism and soulful production. Since then, songs from the album have been featured in various forms of popular media.

== Background ==
Following the release of his critically acclaimed debut solo album Boy Meets World in 2009, Fashawn spent the subsequent years involved in numerous musical endeavors. Through collaboration albums, mixtapes, and guest appearances, he worked with many high-profile artists and producers such as J. Cole, Wiz Khalifa, Murs, Evidence, DJ Dahi, and 9th Wonder. He also continued to tour around the United States and overseas, including joining Kendrick Lamar on stage for a duo freestyle at Hip Hop Kemp, as well as performing the entrance theme to WBO welterweight champion Timothy Bradley's rematch against Manny Pacquiao at the MGM Grand Garden Arena. As Fashawn garnered more mainstream attention, anticipation for his sophomore album grew.

After nearly five years since the release of his debut album, it was announced in 2014 that Fashawn's second full-length solo album The Ecology was in the recording process, with Exile once again handling most of the production. In an April 2014 interview, Fashawn stated, "The Ecology has been a concept that started at least five years ago for me. I took the time to really work on this project because I knew that it would be important not just for my career, but for hip-hop. There could be no better time for all these blessings to be coming my way, and I'm just so happy to say that The Ecology will be coming out."

== Release and promotion ==
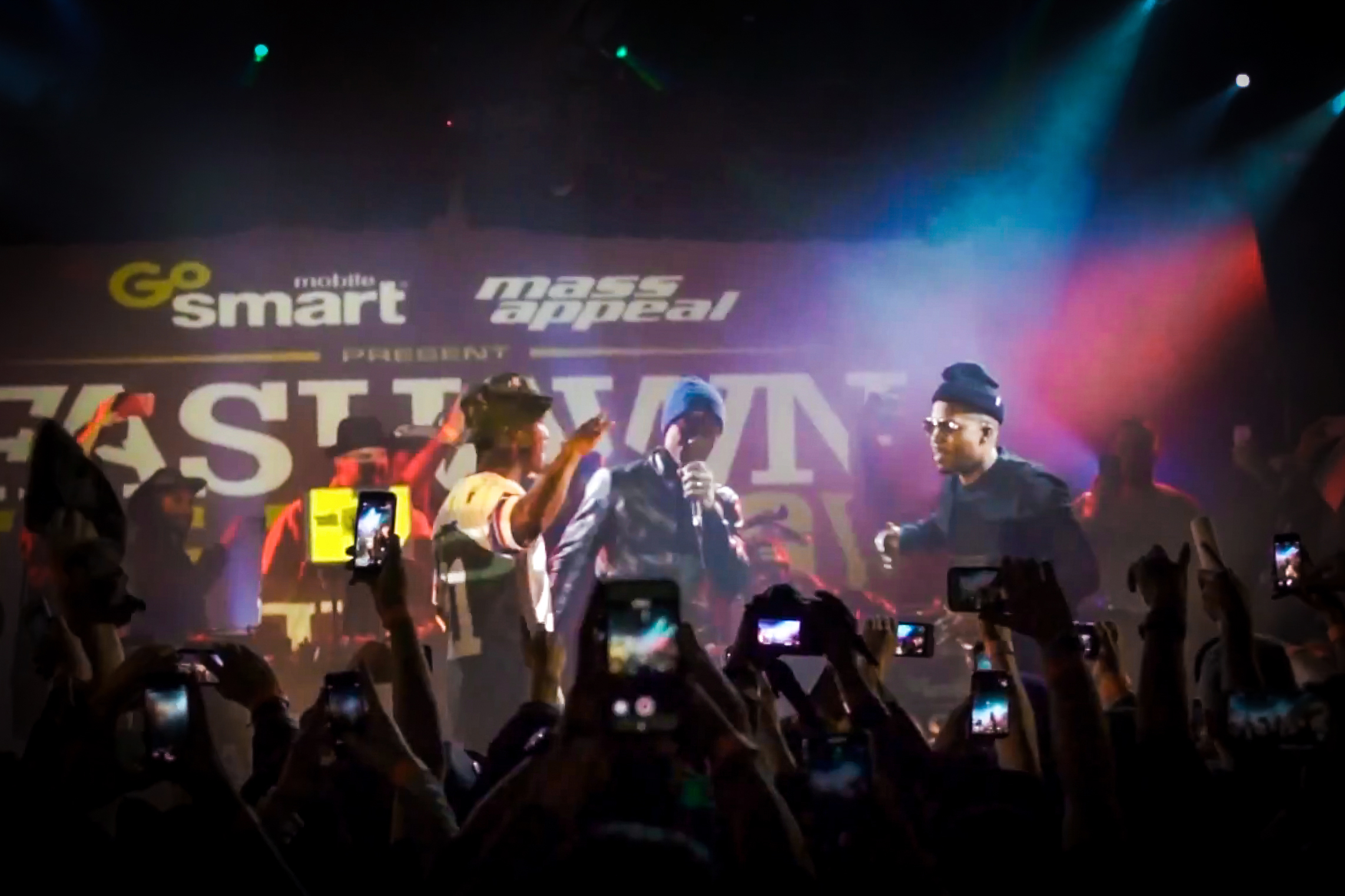
Fashawn is joined by Nas and Aloe Blacc during "The Ecology" album release concert in Los Angeles.

On June 9, 2014, a variety of media outlets reported that Fashawn had officially signed to Nas' Mass Appeal Records, and that The Ecology was scheduled to be released under the new label. "Fashawn is one of the most underrated in the game," Nas said in a statement. "The world is gonna know soon. We're excited to have him as a part of the family." On August 21, 2014, Fashawn held a private listening party for The Ecology at a sold-out venue in his hometown Fresno, California, where attendees heard the entire album for the first time. He continued to keep busy with shows, including a performance set at Nas' 20-Year Illmatic Anniversary Concert at the Cosmopolitan of Las Vegas in October 2014.

As a prelude to his new album, Fashawn also released an EP with The Alchemist titled FASH-ionably Late on December 18, 2014. In January 2015, Fashawn announced that The Ecology would be officially released on February 24, 2015, and that he would also embark on a nationwide tour soon after its release. An official track list soon followed, which confirmed guest features by Nas, Aloe Blacc, BJ the Chicago Kid, and Dom Kennedy. On February 20, 2014, Fashawn surprised eager fans by releasing The Ecology on iTunes ahead of schedule, with the album debuting on its Top 10 Hip-Hop Albums Chart. Physical CD and vinyl copies of The Ecology maintained the original release date of February 24, 2015.

To kickoff The Ecology tour in the United States, a special album release concert took place at Echoplex in Los Angeles on February 26, 2015, in which Fashawn headlined a sold-out venue with additional performances by Aloe Blacc, Blu, Exile, and more. The event was also highlighted by surprise guest appearances by Nas, Dilated Peoples, Dom Kennedy, and Everlast (who performed the 90s classic "Jump Around") to an energetic crowd. Following his American tour, Fashawn later embarked on The Ecology European Tour along with Exile in September 2015.

=== Singles ===
The album's first single "Golden State of Mind" was released to iTunes on October 21, 2014. The track contains a west coast anthem vibe and features fellow California native Dom Kennedy. A second single "Guess Who's Back" was released via digital distribution on January 27, 2015. On February 17, 2015, a third single "Out the Trunk" (featuring Busta Rhymes on the chorus) was released for online listening. On May 18, 2015, MTV debuted the official remix for "Out the Trunk", featuring a brand new verse from Busta Rhymes.

"Something to Believe In", one of the most anticipated tracks from The Ecology, was premiered by Billboard on February 19, 2015. The song features Nas, who serves as executive producer for the album, and Aloe Blacc, a long-time collaborator of Fashawn.

=== Music videos ===
The first music video "Guess Who's Back" debuted on February 10, 2015. The video shows Fashawn reflecting on overcoming challenges in his hometown of Fresno, and contains a notable scene shot inside the city's Chukchansi Park with nobody present in the entire stadium except Fashawn. A second music video was released on April 24, 2015 for "Higher", in which Fashawn pays tribute to his daughter. Both his daughter and the song's producer Exile appear in the video. An animated video for "Confess" was released on October 1, 2015. The video contains over a dozen animated cameo appearances by Earl Sweatshirt, Killer Mike, Bishop Nehru, Large Professor, and more.

=== Documentary ===
In conjunction with the album, Mass Appeal Records released "The Ecology", a 16-minute film documentary that explores the emotional and economic hardships that Fashawn had to overcome at a young age, as well as the musical journey that ultimately led to Nas signing him to Mass Appeal Records. The film is directed by Punit Dhesi, and features heartfelt reflections given by Fashawn, his mother and uncle, manager Aren Hekimian, producer Exile, mentor Evidence, and others.

== Critical reception ==
Professional ratings
Aggregate scores
Source	Rating
Metacritic	84/100
Review scores
Source	Rating
XXL	4/5 stars
HipHopDX	4/5 stars
Exclaim!	4/5 stars

The Ecology was met with universal acclaim from contemporary music critics. At Metacritic, which assigns a normalized rating out of 100 to reviews from mainstream critics, the album received a composite score of 84, indicating "universal acclaim". In a USA Today article, The Ecology ranked at number 5 among the Top 10 Hip-Hop Albums of 2015. Darryl Robertson of XXL gave the album an XL rating, saying that "The Ecology’s core throbs with an MC offering an array of content matched with the confidence to tell his story, even if it’s not about moving tons of drugs, fucking bitches and being covered in jewels." HipHopDX gave the album a favorable review, stating that "Fashawn’s sophomore release is a strong follow-up, six years in the making, that hits hard while preaching perseverance. Mass Appeal appears to be doing all the right things, and Fashawn is in a unique position on a roster ripe with young talent. The Ecology is the great second album he needed to keep trending upwards." In a positive review for Exclaim!, Del F. Cowie wrote that "Fashawn hangs admirably with his label boss [Nas], assertively vowing he's in it for the long haul, issuing a forthright missive that confirms The Ecology was definitely worth the wait.". Jeff Weiss of LA Weekly commented, "There’s heartfelt realism, raw raps and endearing warmth."

== Popular culture ==
"The Letter F" appears on the soundtrack for the video game NBA Live 15, released by EA Sports on October 28, 2014. The game's successor NBA Live 16 was released on September 29, 2015, and features "Out the Trunk" as its main theme.

"Something to Believe In" appears on the soundtrack for the video game WWE 2K16 by 2K Sports, released on October 27, 2015. The song also appears on Madden NFL 16 by EA Sports, released on August 25, 2015.

== Track listing ==
No.	Title	Producer(s)	Length
1.	"Guess Who's Back"	Beewirks; Exile^{[a]}	4:02
2.	"Confess"	Exile	3:14
3.	"Something to Believe In" (featuring Nas and Aloe Blacc)	DJ Khalil	4:04
4.	"Higher"	Exile	4:25
5.	"To Be Young" (featuring BJ the Chicago Kid)	Exile	3:36
6.	"Golden State of Mind" (featuring Dom Kennedy)	Exile	4:22
7.	"Letter F"	The Alchemist	2:57
8.	"Place to Go"	Exile	4:21
9.	"Man of the House"	Quincey Tones; Jo Caleb	4:20
10.	"Out the Trunk"	Exile	3:11
11.	"It's a Good Thing" (featuring Emanon and Choosey)	Exile	4:22
12.	"Mother"	Exile	3:41
13.	"F.T.W"	Exile; Farmer Grief^{[a]}	4:40
14.	"Just Remember Now" (bonus track)	ATG	4:15

Notes

- ^{^a} signifies an additional producer.
