= The Antidote (Fashawn album) =

Mixtape by Fashawn
- Released: September 9, 2009
- Recorded: 2009
- Genre: Hip-hop
- Producer: The Alchemist

Fashawn chronology
Higher Learning (2008)	The Antidote (2009)	Boy Meets World (2009)

The Antidote is a mixtape by American hip-hop recording artists Fashawn, released on September 9, 2009. Compiled and produced entirely by The Alchemist, the mixtape served as a warmup for Fashawn's debut solo album Boy Meets World, which was released on October 22, 2009. The mixtape contains 11 original tracks, with guest appearances from Bravo, Roc C, Oh No and The Alchemist himself.

== Track listing ==
All tracks are produced by The Alchemist.

The Antidote track listing
No.	Title	Length
1.	"Intro"	0:32
2.	"Shall Come a New Name"	2:31
3.	"Fash Plays It Cool"	2:39
4.	"The Antidote"	2:13
5.	"Gone In 60 Seconds" (featuring Bravo)	1:45
6.	"Rap Seduction"	1:26
7.	"What's Your World"	3:12
8.	"From the Creation" (featuring The Alchemist, Roc C & Oh No)	2:50
9.	"F.Y.I."	1:07
10.	"Lost in New York"	1:43
11.	"Got It Sewn"	2:53
