= Bangin Westcoast =

Bangin West Coast

Studio album by Soopafly
- Released: May 8, 2007
- Recorded: 2005–07
- Genre: West Coast hip hop; gangsta rap; G-funk
- Length: 59:08
- Label: Gangsta Advisory
- Producer: Daz Dillinger (exec.); Soopafly (also exec.); DEA; DJ Battlecat; DJ Sebb; E-Swift; Exile; Mr. Porter

Soopafly chronology
Dat Whoopty Woop (2001)	Bangin West Coast (2007)	Snoop Dogg Presents: Dubb Union (2008)

Professional ratings
Review scores
Source	Rating
DubCNN	3/5

Bangin West Coast is the second studio album by American rapper and record producer Soopafly. It was officially released on May 8, 2007, through Gangsta Advisory Recordingz, despite the advance leaked in 2006. Production was handled by Soopafly himself, who also served as executive producer together with Daz Dillinger, Mr. Porter, DEA, DJ Battlecat, DJ Sebb, E-Swift and Exile. It features guest appearances from Tha Dogg Pound, Snoop Dogg, B-Real, LaToyia Williams and Nate Dogg.

== Track listing ==
No.	Title	Producer(s)	Length
1.	"That Way"	Exile	3:29
2.	"Crazy"	Soopafly	2:59
3.	"Ready" (featuring Tha Dogg Pound)	Soopafly	3:23
4.	"Bangin' West Coast"	Soopafly	4:39
5.	"Get Ya Paper" (featuring Daz Dillinger)	Mr. Porter	3:47
6.	"Say It Again"	Mr. Porter	3:05
7.	"Wrong Move"	Soopafly	3:41
8.	"The Turnaround" (featuring B-Real)	Soopafly	3:28
9.	"For tha Better (Insert)"	Soopafly	1:22
10.	"Number 1" (featuring Snoop Dogg, Nate Dogg and Daz Dillinger)	Soopafly	5:23
11.	"Talented" (featuring Snoop Dogg)	E-Swift	3:38
12.	"All 4 U"	Soopafly	4:02
13.	"Smacc Yo' Ass"	DJ Battlecat	4:14
14.	"Shudna Broughter"	DJ Sebb	3:01
15.	"Come Wit' Me"	DEA	3:52
16.	"For tha Better" (featuring LaToiya Williams)	Soopafly	5:05
Total length:			59:08

== Personnel ==
- Priest "Soopafly" Brooks – vocals, producer (tracks: 2–4, 7–10, 12, 16), executive producer
- Delmar "Daz Dillinger" Arnaud – vocals (tracks: 3, 5, 10), executive producer
- Ricardo "Kurupt" Brown – vocals (track 3)
- Louis "B-Real" Freese – vocals (track 8)
- Calvin "Snoop Dogg" Broadus – vocals (tracks: 10, 11)
- Nathaniel "Nate Dogg" Hale – vocals (track 10)
- LaToiya Williams – vocals (track 16)
- Aleksander "Exile" Manfredi – producer (track 1)
- Denaun "Kon Artis" Porter – producer (tracks: 5, 6)
- Eric "E-Swift" Brooks – producer (track 11)
- Kevin "DJ Battlecat" Gilliam – producer (track 13)
- Sébastien "DJ Sebb" Vuignier – producer (track 14)
- DEA – producer (track 15)
- Alex "Toon" Deligiannis – cover design
- Young Breezy – cover design
- Arnold "Bigg A" White – markerting, promotion
