= Champagne & Styrofoam Cups =

Mixtape by Fashawn
- Released: November 20, 2012
- Recorded: 2012
- Genre: Hip hop
- Length: 56:42
- Label: The IAN Group
- Producers: DJ Dahi; Jake One; Exile; Evidence; Rahki; ATG; Phonix; J. LBS; Hecktik; Nima Fadavi; JRB; Cheffy P

Champagne & Styrofoam Cups is a mixtape by American hip hop recording artist Fashawn, released on November 20, 2012. The mixtape contains 16 original tracks, with guest features by Wiz Khalifa, Taylor Gang Records artists Chevy Woods and Berner, singer Kobe, and more. Contributing producers included DJ Dahi, Jake One, Exile, Evidence, and Rahki.

== Track listing ==
No.	Title	Producer(s)	Length
1.	"Hola Santiago"	Exile	2:42
2.	"Coogi" (featuring Mr. Muthafuckin' eXquire)	DJ Dahi	3:52
3.	"Worldwide" (featuring TL Cross)	Phonix	3:49
4.	"Stardumb"	Evidence	3:21
5.	"Diamonds & Girls" (featuring K-Young)	J. LBS	3:38
6.	"Color Blind"	Hecktik	4:06
7.	"In Love With a Lie"	DJ Dahi	3:07
8.	"Living to Die" (featuring Kobe)	Rahki	3:31
9.	"Medicine Man (Drug Free)" (featuring Wiz Khalifa)	DJ Dahi & J. LBS	2:55
10.	"Just a Man"	Jake One	2:54
11.	"Dark Cloud"	ATG	4:26
12.	"Heard It All Before"	Exile	3:53
13.	"Heaven"	ATG	3:56
14.	"Back In the Game" (featuring Chevy Woods)	JRB	4:24
15.	"Kush Jar" (featuring Berner)	Nima Fadavi	2:57
16.	"Grizzly City Boy 2" (featuring Dinero Sucio)	Cheffy P	4:15
