= Kush (song) =

Single by Dr. Dre featuring Snoop Dogg and Akon
- Released: November 18, 2010
- Recorded: 2010
- Genre: Hip-hop
- Length: 3:55
- Label: Aftermath; Interscope
- Songwriters: Andre Young; Brian Honeycutt; Anthony Johnson; Sylvester Jordan; Daniel Tannenbaum; Khalil Abdul-Rahman
- Producers: DJ Khalil; Bekon

Dr. Dre singles chronology
"Crack a Bottle" (2009)	"Kush" (2010)	"I Need a Doctor" (2011)

Snoop Dogg singles chronology
"New Year's Eve" (2010)	"Kush" (2010)	"Wet" (2010)

Akon singles chronology
"Hold My Hand" (2010)	"Kush" (2010)	"I Just Had Sex" (2011)

"Kush" is a single by American rapper Dr. Dre featuring fellow American rapper Snoop Dogg and Senegalese-American singer Akon. It was released via digital download on November 18, 2010. The song was produced by DJ Khalil and mixed by Dr. Dre, with additional keys by Daniel "Danny Keyz" Tannenbaum. The song has additional vocals by Sly "Pyper" Jordan, Kobe Honeycutt, Blackthoven, and Slim the Mobster.

== Background ==
On November 16, 2010, an unfinished version of the song leaked onto the Internet. On the same day, Dr. Dre spoke on Radio Big Boy regarding the status of his album and the leaked song:

"I see a finish line right now, I'm wrapping it up, I need about two or three more songs and hopefully I will start the mixing process at the end of next month and from that point I am about 30 days out, so I'm excited about it." "Kush got leaked, it was a version of it that got leaked that I wasn't really happy about, so we are gonna go in push it and put it out because everyone seems to like it. Y'know I just thought, like, the content it's about weed smoking and I don't want people to think that's what my album is about, this is actually the only song with that type of content in it."

Later that same day, a mastered version of "Kush" was released along with the creation of a new website. The song was featured in episode fourteen of season eleven of CSI.

The song was originally going to be the only one from his upcoming studio album that had a smoker type of subject matter, but on September 21, 2011, Dre tweeted that both "I Need a Doctor" and "Kush" would not make the final cut of the album.

== Composition ==
"Kush" took three to four months to complete due to the numerous production stages that it eventually went through. The genesis of the song came when Dr. Dre's request for a single prompted producer DJ Khalil to pick out an archived vocal sample he had previously made of songwriter collaborator Kobe Honeycutt that he felt would be perfect to build a new Dre track around. Khalil told HitQuarters that he began with the sample of Honeycutt saying "Hold up, wait a minute, let me put some kush up in it", which he looped in Reason, and the drums, which he tried to make sound "pulsating and clubby". Keyboard player Danny Keyz then added a synth which Khalil then filtered and washed out with a reverb. To this basic track, they started adding hook parts and different vocals to give the song a constantly evolving sound, but at the same time, Khalil was mindful to keep the production as open and spare as possible.

== Critical reception ==
Steven Hyden and Genevieve Koski of The A.V. Club each reviewed "Kush", with Hyden giving it a "B+" grade, and Koski giving it a "B" grade. Chase McMullen of Beats Per Minute rated it a six out of ten, and called it "a simplistic weed anthem complete with an Akon chorus and a silly "Inhale, Exhale" refrain: it's by the numbers." Christian Hoard of Rolling Stone rated it two out of five stars, and said it is "hookless, forgettable bud love."

== Music video ==
Joseph Kahn directed the music video for the song. The music video was shot November 18, 2010, in Downtown LA. 50 Cent, E-40, Roccett, The Menace, and Glasses Malone were present for the shooting of the video, but do not make cameo appearances. DJ Khalil, producer of the song, makes a cameo appearance, throwing a Beats By Dr. Dre headphone towards the camera in a freeze frame shot. December 10, 2010, marked the video's release on Vevo. The video, directed by Joseph Kahn, begins as Dre is seated in a sleek, black Lamborghini, attempting to flick a Zippo lighter. Once Dr. Dre ignites it, the beat drops, and he exits the car. Dre approaches the club in a setting similar to "The Next Episode", one of his past hits. But the festivities around him are ice cold; the club patrons are statue-like, frozen in the parking lot and inside, in mid groove. Snoop Dogg kicks things off on the second verse, and he is surrounded by a bevy of frozen women. They're smiling, drinks are pouring, but they're also statues compared to the rapper. As Dre makes his way into the club and to the bar, however, the party livens up. Dre pulls out his lighter, engraved with the song's title, and holds it to the sprinklers overhead, setting them off. As water rains down on the partygoers, they come back to life, gyrating to the thumping track's production. Later, Dre and Snoop leave the club, and Dre drives off into the night on an empty highway, surrounded by the streaking lights of cars that are no longer there. Akon makes appearances periodically while singing the hook. He appears to be in a private jet with money frozen in mid-air, as well as women seemingly dancing, though they too aren't moving.

== Remixes ==
Dr.Dre ft Snoop Dogg and Akon
Music sample of Kush.

On December 2, 2010, the official remix of the song was released featuring Game, Snoop Dogg & Akon. There are two remixes, both containing different verses from Game. Jay Rock has released a freestyle to the track. Gilbere Forte also released a Freestyle Version of this song. Slim da Mobster has freestyled over the beat. Mike G of OFWGKTA released 707 over the instrumental. Dr. Dre, along with Akon and Snoop Dogg, performed this song at the Grammy Interscope Party along with "The Next Episode", "Nuthin' but a 'G' Thang", "Gin and Juice" and "Still D.R.E.".

== Charts ==
Chart (2010–2011)	Peak position
Australia (ARIA)	81
Belgium (Ultratip Bubbling Under Flanders)	3
Belgium (Ultratip Bubbling Under Wallonia)	5
Canada Hot 100 (Billboard)	33
France (SNEP)	46
Switzerland (Schweizer Hitparade)	59
UK Singles (Official Charts)	57
US Billboard Hot 100	34
US Hot R&B/Hip-Hop Songs (Billboard)	43
US Hot Rap Songs (Billboard)	11
US Rhythmic Airplay (Billboard)	16

== Certifications ==
Region	Certification	Certified units/sales
New Zealand (RMNZ)	Gold	15,000^{‡}
Brazil (Pro-Música Brasil)	Gold	30,000^{‡}
^{‡} Sales+streaming figures based on certification alone.

== Release history ==
Region	Date	Format
United States	November 18, 2010	Digital download
United Kingdom	November 21, 2010	Digital download
Rhythmic Radio	November 23, 2010	Radio play
Urban Radio	December 7, 2010	Radio play
