= FASH-ionably Late =

EP by Fashawn & The Alchemist
- Released: December 18, 2014
- Recorded: 2014
- Genre: Hip-hop
- Length: 24:27
- Producer: The Alchemist

FASH-ionably Late is a collaboration EP by American hip-hop recording artists Fashawn and The Alchemist, released on December 18, 2014. The project contains seven original tracks, with Fashawn rapping over The Alchemist's production. The EP serves as a prelude to Fashawn's long-anticipated second solo album The Ecology, which was released on February 24, 2015 under Nas' Mass Appeal Records.

To celebrate the release of FASH-ionably Late, Grizzly Griptape (a division of streetwear brand Diamond Supply Co.) teamed up with Fashawn and The Alchemist to create a limited edition collaboration T-shirt; Grizzly's logo is featured in the artwork of the EP, as well as Fashawn wearing a Grizzly hoodie in the video for the track "Dreams."

== Track listing ==
All tracks produced by The Alchemist

| No. | Title | Length |
|---|---|---|
| 1. | "Po For President" | 2:30 |
| 2. | "Dreams" (featuring Evidence) | 3:40 |
| 3. | "Professor F" | 3:47 |
| 4. | "Amen" | 3:38 |
| 5. | "The Plantation" | 2:54 |
| 6. | "Songs in F Major" | 4:13 |
| 7. | "Never Waiting In Vein" | 3:45 |
