= Below the Heavens =

Studio album by Blu & Exile
- Released: July 17, 2007
- Genre: Hip-hop
- Length: 65:55
- Label: Sound in Color
- Producer: Exile

Blu & Exile chronology
Below the Heavens (2007)	Give Me My Flowers While I Can Still Smell Them (2012)

Professional ratings
Review scores
Source	Rating
AllHipHop	favorable
HipHopDX	4.0/5
Pitchfork	8.7/10
RapReviews.com	8/10

Below the Heavens is the debut studio album by American hip-hop duo Blu & Exile. It was released by Sound in Color on July 17, 2007. It serves as Blu's debut album, while Exile had previously released his solo album Dirty Science and two albums as a member of the duo Emanon.

PopMatters placed it at number 56 on its list of the "Best Albums of 2007". In 2015, it was listed by HipHopDX as one of the "30 Best Underground Hip Hop Albums Since 2000".

== Music ==
Blu provides rap vocals on all of the album's songs, while Exile produces all of the songs and raps just on the bonus track "I Am..". In addition, the album features guest performers Ta'Raach, Aloe Blacc, and Miguel.

== Release ==
Below the Heavens has been reissued twice since going out of print in 2009. In 2011, the album was reissued on Vinyl Call Records. On January 21, 2014, the album was reissued on Fat Beats Records on compact disc with three bonus tracks, limited edition cassette with one bonus track, and vinyl with a 7-inch vinyl with two unreleased instrumentals.

== Track listing ==
No.	Title	Length
1.	"My World Is..."	3:40
2.	"The Narrow Path"	5:09
3.	"So(ul) Amazin' (Steel Blazin')"	4:38
4.	"Juicen' Dranks" (featuring Ta'Raach)	3:44
5.	"In Remembrance of Me"	4:03
6.	"Blu Colla Workers"	4:30
7.	"Dancing in the Rain"	4:25
8.	"First Things First" (featuring Miguel)	3:50
9.	"No Greater Love"	4:14
10.	"Show Me the Good Life" (featuring Aloe Blacc and Joseph)	5:23
11.	"Simply Amazin'"	3:29
12.	"Cold Hearted" (featuring Miguel)	3:12
13.	"The World Is (Below the Heavens...)"	4:26
14.	"You Are Now in the Clouds With (The Koochie Monstas)"	3:49
15.	"I Am..."	7:26

== Personnel ==
- Blu – vocals, writer
- Exile – producer, scratches
- DJ Romes – mixing
- Kelly Hibbert – mastering
- Louis Yakich – executive producer, A&R
- Chanshine Nagangzang – executive producer
- Diego Carlin – executive producer
