= Deep Rooted =

American hip-hop group

- Origin: San Diego, California, United States
- Genre: Hip-hop
- Years active: 2004–2009
- Labels: Open Myndz Entertainment; Clear Label Records
- Members: Johaz; Mr. Brady; Brea; DJ Artistic

Deep Rooted was an American hip-hop group based in San Diego, California. It was formed in 2004 by rappers Johaz, Mr. Brady, singer Brea and DJ Artistic. The group also included two dancers, CeSe and Boosie. They released three albums, A New Beginning in 2004, The Second Coming in 2006 and D.E.E.P.R.O.O.T.E.D in 2009. Each album won Best Hip-Hop Album at the San Diego Music Awards. The group was also nominated for Best Hip-Hop Group every year from 2005 to 2008, and won the award in 2010. They performed live at Warped Tour in 2005. The song "La La", from their first album, was featured on the soundtrack of NBA 2K7.

== Discography ==
Albums

- A New Beginning (2004)
- The Second Coming (2006)
- D.E.E.P.R.O.O.T.E.D (2009)
