= Young Kidd =

YK The Mayor
- Born: Frankie Fontaine; October 1, 1988 (age 38); Winnipeg, Manitoba
- Genre: Hip hop
- Years active: 2005–present
- Label: CTL Records

Frankie Fontaine (born October 1, 1988), better known by the stage name Young Kidd or YK the Mayor, is a Canadian rapper of aboriginal and Jamaican heritage. He began performing in 2005 and has released multiple mixtapes, two albums and was nominated for two APCMA awards in 2010. Fontaine has been successful in the Winnipeg rap scene.

== Early life ==
Fontaine was born in Winnipeg, Manitoba. He attended Tec Voc High School. He began rapping in 2004 through a program called Mic Check. Fontaine is of both Aboriginal and Jamaican descent. His mother is originally from Sagkeeng First Nation. and his father is originally from Kingston, Jamaica. Fontaine had no contact with his father for most of his early life and did not establish a relationship with him until the age of 31. Fontaine spent his early years playing sports and loving Hip Hop music, writing his first song at 12 years old. He would go on to show it to his mother who began encouraging him to continue working and practicing his craft. At the end of the day we all have Ms. Fontaine to thank for the creation of Young Kidd aka YK The Mayor. For giving birth to him and for inspiring him to keep making music and working at perfecting his craft.

== Discography ==
=== Mixtapes ===
- The Beginning (2006)
- Hustlaz Mentality (2007)
- Back In Bizness (2007) with Tweety from Exotic Boiz (South Carolina U.S.A):Produced by LJ Montana
- The February Tape (2010)
- Loyalty (2010)
- April Showers (2011)
- YK THE MAYOR Mixtape (2012)
- Wonderful Winnipeg (2012)
- Long Live The Kidd Mixtape (2013)
- YK mayor living the peg life (2025)

=== Albums ===
- Mic Check :Hip-Hop Program Album (2005) with Critical, JDJ, D-Boi, Tha Kid.
- Peg Town (2006) with Tha Mic, Tha Truth, 3Dee, Franchise.
- You Got Served (2006):Blackhouse Records with Trizzlam, Critical, JDJ
- I Go Hard (2009)
- 10x10 (2010)
- Criminals Turned Legit(2011) with Lotto, Quick Cash, Boogey the Beat & LJ Montana
- Young & Hungry (2011) with Stattis, Zeek Illa, Lotto, Quick Cash, JBird, Stmblz
- From Dreams 2 Reality (2012) Executive Produced by Trizzlam
- Re-Election (2018)(YK THE MAYOR) :First album released since getting out of Prison after 5 years. And changing name to “YK THE MAYOR”
- Liberation (2019) YK The Mayor
- Outside Looking In (2020) (YK THE MAYOR)
- In Case You Forgot (2022)(YK THE MAYOR)

== Legal issues ==
In 2008, Fontaine was forced to pay a $1200 fine and receive one year of probation after he was convicted of possessing a firearm. In May 2009, Fontaine was charged with discharging a firearm for shooting into the ceiling of a sports bar in Winnipeg. He was then put on Bail Conditions after spending a month in jail. He sat on Bail Conditions with a 6pm curfew for 4 years until in May 2013 when he was convicted for the shooting and sentenced to 3 years federal time at Stony Mountain Institution. Fontaine was released after serving 2 years but trouble caught up with him again in 2015 2 months after being released. He was then charged with Possession for the purpose of trafficking and given another 3 years added to his original sentence. All in all YK spent just under 5 years in a Federal Correction Facility(Correctional Service Of Canada)
