= Something to Believe In (Fashawn song) =

"Something To Believe In"

Single by Fashawn featuring Nas and Aloe Blacc

from the album The Ecology
- Released: February 19, 2015
- Recorded: 2014
- Genre: Hip hop; R&B
- Length: 4:04
- Songwriters: Santiago Leyva; Nasir bin Olu Dara Jones; Egbert Nathaniel Dawkins
- Producer: DJ Khalil

Fashawn singles chronology
| "Out The Truck" (2015) | "Something To Believe In" (2015) |

Nas singles chronology
| "Free" (2013) | "Something To Believe In" (2015) | "Chains" (2015) |

Aloe Blacc singles chronology
| "Together (RED)" (2014) | "Something To Believe In" (2015) | "Verge" (2015) |

"Something to Believe In" is a song by American rapper Fashawn, with guest appearances by Nas and Aloe Blacc. It was released on February 19, 2015 as a single from Fashawn's second studio album The Ecology. The song is produced by DJ Khalil. It has received positive critical reception and is also featured on the soundtrack for the video games Madden NFL 16 and WWE 2K16.

== Background and development ==
The song came to fruition after Fashawn signed to Nas' Mass Appeal Records. According to Fashawn, the original instrumental was part of an unreleased collection of material held by Aloe Blacc and his band. Aloe Blacc sent the instrumental to Fashawn, who then recruited DJ Khalil to put together a newer version that contained a more hip-hop feel. Coincidentally, both Fashawn and Nas wrote their verses while touring separately in Europe. In an interview, Fashawn reflected upon the song's creation by saying, "I felt like it was the perfect canvas to paint on and epitomizes what we stand for in rap."

== Critical reception ==
Elias Leight of Billboard commended "Something to Believe In" for preserving hip-hop's history of being grounded in soul and funk. Alicia Miller of Zumic stated that "Fashawn and Nas both drop deep bars in their verses and Blacc croons on the hook with thought-provoking lines".

== Popular culture ==
"Something to Believe In" appears on the soundtrack for the video game WWE 2K16 by 2K Sports, released on October 27, 2015. The song also appears on Madden NFL 16 by EA Sports, released on August 25, 2015.
