= 4TRK Mind =

Studio album by Exile
- Released: October 4, 2011
- Recorded: 2010–2011
- Genre: Underground hip-hop
- Length: 54:30
- Label: Soulspazm
- Producers: Exile; Alphabet Four

Exile chronology
Radio AM/FM (2010)	4TRK Mind (2011)	Klepto (2012)

Professional ratings
Review scores
Source	Rating
Exclaim!	favorable
HipHopDX	3/5 stars
PopMatters	6/10

4TRK Mind is the third studio album by American rapper/producer Exile. It was released on October 4, 2011, on Soulspazm. The album features guest appearances by Alphabet Four and Blu.

== Critical reception ==
In a review for PopMatters, critic reviewer Mike Madden wrote: "This album definitely revolves around Exile's Madlib-indebted style, but it seems as though he culled a bunch of beats that rappers didn't want from him and tried to make something cohesive out of them." He went to describe the release as "ultimately underwhelming." Justin Hunte of HipHopDX said "Most bars on 4TM eventually stray into shallow rappity rap land, where limp-wrist punchlines and eyebrow raising descriptions of his sexual exploits loiter too long, lacking imagination. Despite the vast amounts of lyrical mediocrity littered throughout, Exile deserves credit for holding down the album for fifty-four minutes with only two guest appearances."

== Track listing ==
No.	Title	Producer	Length
1.	"It's Me"	Exile	2:28
2.	"The Man"	Exile	2:17
3.	"You and I"	Exile	2:49
4.	"Klepto"	Exile	5:27
5.	"Love, Luv, Love"	Exile	3:32
6.	"Younger Days"	Exile	6:50
7.	"Crazy in the Head"	Exile	2:10
8.	"Knight Rider"	Exile	4:05
9.	"If You Know Like I Know" (featuring Alphabet Four)	Alphabet Four	3:56
10.	"4ever (Friend Zone Pt. 1)"	Exile	4:58
11.	"Momma Song"	Exile	1:48
12.	"When Nothing's Left" (featuring Blu)	Exile	5:04
13.	"2039"	Exile	4:18
14.	"Who Are You"	Exile	2:48
15.	"I Like You As You Are"	Exile	0:54
16.	"Wanna Be"	Exile	1:17
