= Higher Learning Vol. 2 =

Higher Learning Vol.2

Mixtape by Fashawn
- Released: February 16, 2011
- Genre: Hip hop
- Label: XXL

Higher Learning Vol.2 is a mixtape by American hip hop recording artist Fashawn, released on February 16, 2011. The mixtape is hosted by DJ Ill Will and DJ Rockstar, and presented by XXL Magazine. It features 22 tracks with appearances by J. Cole, GOOD Music artist GLC, Tony Williams, Sam Hook, Gilbere Forte, and more.

The mixtape is particularly known for J. Cole's contributions, which included two vocal appearances and three production credits. Following the mixtape's release, Fashawn embarked on the Higher Learning Tour with Evidence and Del the Funky Homosapien.

On May 25, 2011, a music video was released for the song "Down That Road", featuring Sam Cooke and produced by Nemis. On June 22, 2011, a music video was released for the song "Big Dreams", produced by J. Cole.

Professional ratings
Review scores
Source	Rating
AllHipHop	7.5/10 stars

== Track listing ==
No.	Title	Producer(s)	Length
1.	"Manny Pacquiao" (Intro)	Phonix	3:31
2.	"The G's" (featuring Grafik)	Grafik	3:35
3.	"Down That Road" (Featuring Sam Hook)	Nemis	3:45
4.	"Relaxation" (featuring J. Cole & Omen)	J. Cole	2:24
5.	"Skit (Making It)"		0:59
6.	"Do What I Gotta Do"	JRB	2:48
7.	"In The Rain" (featuring Bravo and Grafik)	Hecktik	3:50
8.	"Nothin For The Radio" (featuring J. Cole)	J. Cole	2:27
9.	"Weed Nap" (featuring Boaz & GLC)	Sayez	4:03
10.	"Skit (Their Playing their Music Again)"		0:31
11.	"Just Another Day" (featuring Gilbere Forte)	Necronan Beats	2:49
12.	"Higher (Remix)"	RZA	3:08
13.	"The Graduate" (featuring Nio The Gift and Halo)	Mayerinated Beats	3:12
14.	"Closer (Remix)"	J Dilla	4:20
15.	"Catch Me When I Fall" (featuring Tony Williams)	JRB	4:32
16.	"Strange Fruit" (featuring Common & John Legend)	Kanye West	4:10
17.	"Interlude"		0:21
18.	"Big Dreams"	J. Cole	3:09
19.	"Eastside Party"	Hecktik	3:18
20.	"Papers (Remix)"	Sean Garrett	4:01
21.	"Going Home"	Javelin	2:59
22.	"Outro"		0:34
