= Harlem's American Gangster =

Mixtape by Jim Jones
- Released: February 19, 2008
- Recorded: 2007–2008
- Genre: East Coast Hip hop
- Labels: Koch; Diplomat; ByrdGang
- Producers: ByrdGang (exec.), I.N.F.O. & NOVA, DJ Khalil, Chinky P, Chad Beatz, Oneya, P Riot, Andreas Dombrowski, Pete Rock, Justa Beast, Feva, King James, Chink Santana

Jim Jones chronology
| A Dipset X-Mas (2006) | Harlem's American Gangster (2008) | Jim Jones & Skull Gang Present A Tribute To Bad Santa Starring Mike Epps (2008) |

Singles from Harlem's American Gangster
- 1. "Love Me No More" Released: January 29, 2008

Professional ratings
Review scores
| Source | Rating |
|---|---|
| Allmusic | 2.5/5 stars |
| DJBooth.net | (unfavorable) |
| RapReviews | 7/10 stars |

Harlem's American Gangster is the sixth mixtape by American rapper Jim Jones, released by Koch Records, Diplomat Records, and ByrdGang Records on February 19, 2008. It peaked at number 19 on the Billboard 200, number three on the Billboard Top R&B/Hip-Hop Albums chart, and number one on the Top Rap Albums chart. The Koch CD was remixed and remastered from a limited edition release that came out the previous November. There was also a change in the track list, with some tracks added and others omitted. The mixtape is hosted by Dame Dash and features members from Jones' hip hop collective, ByrdGang.

"Love Me No More" (featuring Kobe) was released as a single, though it failed to enter any major Billboard charts.

== Album information ==
Jim Jones explained to MTV why he chose to do the album,"The title of this mixtape is a bit controversial," Jim recently told Mixtape Monday about his response to Jay-Z's American Gangster. "[Roc-A-Fella co-founder] Dame [Dash] feels the same way I do about American gangsters: If you snitch, you're not an American gangster. Understand me. That's what we're doing it for." Dame actually crops up on the mixtape — he surfaces in the intro and in a series of skits — while Byrd Gang flagship member Max B did some co-writing. Don't miss "Byrd Gang Money," "Love Me No More" and "Up in Harlem."

== Track listing ==
| # | Title | Producer(s) | Length | Notes |
|---|---|---|---|---|
| 1 | "Intro" (featuring Oshy and Dame Dash) | Chinky P. | 5:06 | |
| 2 | "The King" (featuring NOE) | I.N.F.O. & NOVA | 2:58 | |
| 3 | "Love Me No More" (featuring Kobe) | DJ Khalil | 2:41 | |
| 4 | "Dame Dash Skit #1" | Chinky P | 0:35 | |
| 5 | "Byrd Gang Money" (featuring Mel Matrix & NOE) | Chad Beatz | 4:26 | |
| 6 | "Stay Ballin" | Oneya | 2:10 | |
| 7 | "Dame Dash Skit #2" | Chinky P | 1:04 | |
| 8 | "Come on, Come On" (featuring NOE & Oshy) | Jonny Bro | 2:58 | |
| 9 | "I Gotta Have It" (featuring NOE) | Andreas Dombrowski | 3:05 | |
| 10 | "Dame Dash Skit #3" | Chinky P | 0:36 | |
| 11 | "Up in Harlem" | Pete Rock | 1:37 | Contains elements of the composition "Native New Yorker" by Odyssey |
| 12 | "American Gangsta" | Justa Beast | 2:36 | |
| 13 | "Lifestyle" | Feva | 3:34 | |
| 14 | "Dame Dash Skit #4" (featuring Haruomi Hosono) | Chinky P. | 1:49 | |
| 15 | "Lookin' at the Game" (featuring Stack Bundles) | King James | 3:56 | Contains elements of the composition "Gucci Time" by Schoolly D |
| 16 | "Rockefeller Laws" (featuring Rell) | Chink Santana | 4:47 | |
| 17 | "No Fuss" (featuring Mel Matrix & Stack Bundles) | The Phantom Boyz | 3:32 | |

=== Differences from the original release ===
The Koch release omitted "Global Money Skit", "Two More Blocks", "Money Comes and Money Goes", and "Poverty" from the "unofficial" version, and added "Come on, Come On", "I Gotta Have It", "Lookin at the Game", "Rockefeller Laws", and "No Fuss". Additionally, The Game does not appear on "Love Me No More" as he does on the "unofficial" version of the album.

== Charts ==
=== Weekly charts ===
| Chart (2008) | Peak position |
|---|---|
| US Billboard 200 | 19 |
| US Independent Albums (Billboard) | 1 |
| US Top R&B/Hip-Hop Albums (Billboard) | 3 |
| US Top Rap Albums (Billboard) | 1 |

=== Year-end charts ===
| Chart (2008) | Position |
|---|---|
| US Top R&B/Hip-Hop Albums (Billboard) | 90 |
