= Boy Meets World (album) =

Studio album by Fashawn
- Released: October 20, 2009
- Recorded: 2008–2009
- Genre: Hip-hop
- Length: 75:03
- Label: One Records; EMI
- Producer: Exile

Fashawn chronology
Boy Meets World (2009)	The Ecology (2015)

Boy Meets World is the debut solo album by American rapper Fashawn, with all songs produced by Exile. It was released by the independent record label One Records on October 20, 2009.

The album features guest performances by Aloe Blacc, Evidence, Blu, Planet Asia, Mistah Fab, Co$$, Devoya and J. Mitchell. Music videos were made for "Life as a Shorty", "Samsonite Man", "Our Way", "Sunny CA" and "The Ecology/The Score".

Boy Meets World received critical acclaim from critics who praised the production and Fashawn's storytelling. The album subsequently received attention and recognition from highly respected hip-hop artists. Boy Meets World is now frequently regarded as an underground classic, and garnered much interest in producer Exile, who had previously produced rapper Blu's album Below the Heavens, which also was released to similar acclaim.

== Background and development ==
By 2007, Fashawn had gained attention in the music industry by releasing a series of successful mixtapes. Meanwhile, Exile had joined forces with Blu to release Below the Heavens, an album that would go on to receive wide acclaim. Fashawn gravitated toward Exile's production on Below the Heavens, and both soon came into contact through their respective management teams. In an interview recalling their initial encounter, Exile said:

The first time I ever heard Fashawn rap, my imagination just started going. I started thinking about the possibilities of his voice, and what [stories he could] spit over my beats. I could hear that there might be something special, so I wanted to get him some more beats to see what we could come up with.

The album was recorded at studio sessions in both Fashawn's hometown of Fresno, California and Exile's hometown of Los Angeles, California. Fashawn wrote lyrics for the album up until six months before its release, thus making him between 18 and 19 years old during most of the album's creative process.

== Critical reception ==
Professional ratings
Review scores
Source	Rating
AllMusic	4/5 stars
DJBooth	4/5 stars
HipHopDX	4/5 stars
The Phoenix	4/4 stars
The Smoking Section	4/5 stars
XXL	4/5

Upon its release, Boy Meets World received universal critical acclaim, with many hip-hop critics and listeners regarding the album as a hip-hop "classic". Fashawn was acclaimed for his ability to articulate the inner struggles and dreams of a young kid growing up in a tough environment. XXL Magazine gave the album an XL rating, concluding that Boy Meets World "is a strong debut from such a young MC, and it resonates a lot more than the work of some rappers decades his senior." HipHopDX described Boy Meets World as "one of this year’s finest albums yet, hoping to supply food for thought for the new school while staying true to the culture’s roots, balancing the lyrical and street aspects of Hip Hop with one pen.".

In addition to positive reviews from media outlets, Boys Meets World also garnered the attention of many respected artists in the hip-hop community. Legendary producer Large Professor noted, "The album is what I call traditional, real hip-hop. Mad different dimensions, I was very impressed."

== Track listing ==
All tracks are produced by Exile

No.	Title	Length
1.	"Intro"	2:16
2.	"Freedom"	3:07
3.	"Hey Young World" (featuring Aloe Blacc & Devoya)	4:06
4.	"Stars"	4:28
5.	"Life As a Shorty" (featuring J. Mitchell)	4:21
6.	"The Ecology"	2:42
7.	"Our Way" (featuring Evidence)	3:32
8.	"Why"	4:26
9.	"Samsonite Man" (featuring Blu)	5:13
10.	"The Score" (featuring Planet Asia)	2:45
11.	"Breathe" (featuring Bravo)	3:10
12.	"Father"	3:24
13.	"Sunny CA" (featuring Co$$ & Mistah Fab)	5:40
14.	"Bo Jackson" (featuring Exile)	2:56
15.	"Lupita"	4:21
16.	"When She Calls"	4:18
17.	"Boy Meets World"	10:02
