= Thurz =

American rapper

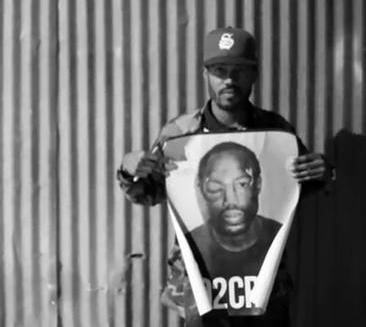

Background information
- Origin: Inglewood, Los Angeles
- Genres: Hip hop; trip hop
- Years active: 2006–present
- Label: London Live
- Formerly of: U-N-I
- Website: http://xxx.thurz.xxx

Yannick "Thurz" Koffi is a solo artist from Inglewood, Los Angeles and one of the former hip hop duo U-N-I. He is a descendant of both the Ivory Coast and Belize, taking his moniker from his last name "Koffi" which translates in Ghana's native language of Akan to "boy born on Friday".

== History ==
As a rap duo U-N-I put out three street albums and one mixtape Fried Chicken & Watermelon (2007), Before There Was Love (2009), A Love Supreme (2009) and A Love Supreme 2.0 (2010) becoming known throughout the urban and alternative blogosphere during a time of “hipster” movement momentum. The duo were credited with reviving the "true essence" of hip-hop, rejecting the gangsta rap style that had become common. As a duo they won the 2008 MTV Video Music Award for “Best Breakout LA Artist”

On April 2 he performed as a solo artist for the first time at The 2011 Paid Dues Festival in San Bernardino along with Black Star, Immortal Technique, Asher Roth, Dead Prez, E-40, Murs, Blu & Fashawn.

== L.A. Riot ==
In February 2011 he announced he would be putting out a solo album entitled L.A. Riot.

Paying tribute to the 20th Anniversary of the Rodney King beating (March 3, 1991) he released to YouTube a politically inspired re-enactment of the assault. The video clip transformed him into the image of the motorist (via makeup and computer effects). In conjunction he debuted the first song “Rodney King” which was a stark contrast to the music that U-N-I were known for which predominately centered on themes of video games, sneakers and women. “Rodney King” discusses every detail from the night of the beating including the statistics of the basketball game King was watching, the alcohol consumption, the marijuana, the make and model of car he was driving; the chase through highways and residential areas through Lake View Terrace interspersed with King's parole worries; the brutality captured on video by a plumber named George Holliday. He raps: "Beware: This stormy black Monday will morph its way into a black plague of agony: broken glass, burning buildings coughing up black smoke. My pain will be a molotov cocktail of hope for all those who sit silent, listening, contemplating violence, awaiting their turn to play their part in the uprising we call Rodney King Riots."

He released the second single “Los Angeles” on April 29 to commemorate the 19th anniversary of the Los Angeles riots that took place during the course of six days (April 29-May 4, 1992) in Los Angeles’ South Central community. He has said that these socio-economic and political uprisings as well as the recent North Africa protests serve as the backdrop behind this concept album. Throughout the music and multimedia campaign a central question he asks fans is "What do you Riot for?" Even releasing an official "Riot Manifesto" which included statements like “I Riot, because BET has failed every generation after 1999” and “I Riot, because I haven't felt the same love and attachment for an album since Redman's Muddy Waters.”

On June 21 he released the third single "Prayer" which officially confirmed the break-up of U-N-I after a groundswell of speculation from fans.

The album features production from longtime collaborator RO Blvd (U-N-I), DJ Khalil (Eminem, Jay-Z, 50 Cent), Aaron Harris (Dr. Dre, Dead Prez), THX (Murs, The Clipse, Mobb Deep) and Terrace Martin (Snoop Dogg, Lalah Hathaway). Tracks include "Niggas" which discusses the divisive n-word, race, self-hate and self-love. "Two Clips" produced by Grammy Award winning producer DJ Khalil features street-based singer-songwriter Kobe and deals with patterns of recurring gang violence. Other guest artists include Black Thought of The Roots and BJ the Chicago Kid.

He has collaborated with his longtime visual director Tomas Whitmore for what will soon be a video documentary surrounding all aspects of the 1992 Los Angeles Riots, set for release in Spring 2012 on the 20-year anniversary. They will interview various members of the South Central community who were present around Florence and Normandie during the beating and riots.

He currently serves as General Manager at Holy Grail, a consignment sneaker store located in Downtown Los Angeles.

== Discography ==
=== Albums ===
- L.A. Riot (2011)
- Yannick Koffi: In Time (2024)

=== Mixtapes ===
- 517 W Queen Tape (2012)

=== Extended plays ===
- Designer EP (2014)

=== Singles ===
- "Los Angeles" (2011)
- "Rodney King" (2011)
- "Prayer" (2011)
- "RIOT" (featuring Black Thought of The Roots) (2011)

== See also ==
- Los Angeles hip hop
