= Emanon =

American hip hop group

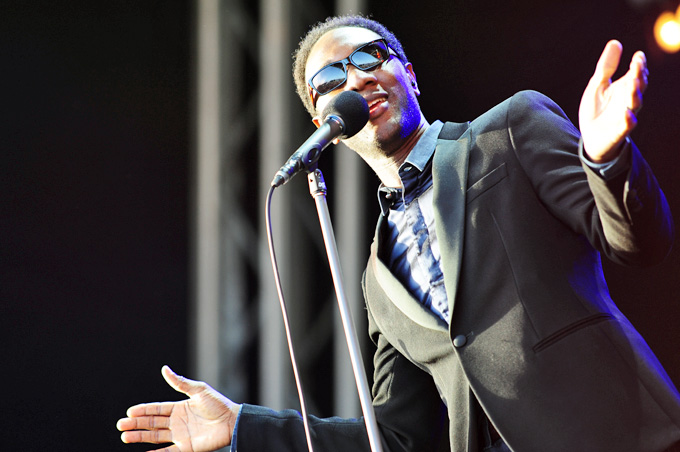
- Aloe Blacc of Emanon in 2012

Background information
- Origin: Orange County, California, United States
- Genres: Hip hop
- Years active: 1995–present
- Members: Aloe Blacc; Exile

Emanon is an American musical duo formed in 1995, in Los Angeles, California, composed of rapper and singer-songwriter Aloe Blacc and record producer Exile.

== History ==
Emanon released the extended play (EP) Anon and On, on Ill Boogie Records in 2002 and The Waiting Room on Shaman Works Recordings in 2005. Exile's first album Dirty Science, released in 2006, includes contributions from Slum Village, Kardinal Offishall and Oh No.

== Discography ==
=== Studio albums ===
- Imaginary Friends (2001)
- The Waiting Room (2005)
- Dystopia (2016)

=== EPs ===
- Acid 9 (1998)
- Anon & On (2002)

=== Compilation albums ===
- Steps Through Time 1997-2000 (2001)
