= Fashawn =

American rapper (born 1988)

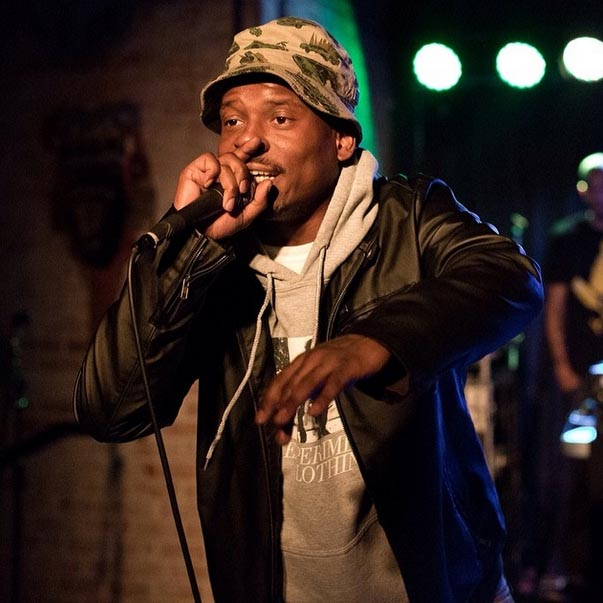
- Fashawn in 2014

Background information
- Born: Santiago Leyva; October 19, 1988 (age 37)
- Origin: Fresno, California, U.S.
- Genres: West Coast hip-hop
- Occupations: Rapper; songwriter
- Works: Fashawn discography
- Years active: 2006–present
- Labels: Mass Appeal; The IAN Group; One
- Website: www.fashawn.ca

Santiago Leyva (born October 19, 1988), better known by his stage name Fashawn, is an American rapper from Fresno, California. He first gained recognition for his debut studio album Boy Meets World (2009), which received critical acclaim and landed him on the cover of XXL Magazine's Top 10 Freshmen issue in 2010. He signed with Nas' record label Mass Appeal Records in 2014 to release his similarly-acclaimed second album and major label debut, The Ecology (2015).

Also in 2014, Fashawn performed the entrance theme to WBO welterweight champion Timothy Bradley's rematch against Manny Pacquiao.

== Life and career ==
=== 1988–2009: Early life and career beginnings ===
Santiago Leyva was born on October 19, 1988, in Fresno, California to a Black mother and a Mexican father, where he had a rough childhood due to his father being incarcerated for a long period of time, while his single mother also had to deal with drug addiction. When he was 8 years old, Fashawn and his sister were both placed in a group home, before their Uncle Roy took them into his custody as a father figure. Fashawn recalls writing his first rhyme at 8 years old and became fully engrossed in writing by 2000.

In 2006, Fashawn released his first mixtape, Grizzly City, catching the attention of fellow Fresno MC Planet Asia, who invited him to tour with him. Knowing the opportunity that presented him, Fashawn dropped out of school and pursued his dream. From 2007 to 2008, he established his presence throughout the Central California hip-hop scene, working with manager Aren Hekimian and releasing multiple mixtapes, including: The Phenom, Grizzly City 2, The Phenom 2, Higher Learning, and One Shot One Kill, which was released by Orisue Clothing. One Shot One Kill was well received by both fans and hip-hop websites, including OnSMASH and DatPiff, gaining him more attention and momentum as an upcoming artist.

=== 2009–2012: Boy Meets World, XXL cover, and his collaboration album with Murs ===
In 2009, Fashawn performed throughout the United States with various hip-hop acts, including separate tours with Ghostface Killah and The Grouch. On September 24, 2009, he released a project produced entirely by The Alchemist titled The Antidote to get fans hyped up for his debut solo album. On October 22, 2009, Fashawn released his first full-length album, titled Boy Meets World, which was produced entirely by Exile. The album received critical acclaim, and Fashawn was praised for his ability to articulate the inner struggles and dreams of a young kid growing up in a tough environment. XXL Magazine gave the album an XL rating, concluding Boy Meets World is a strong debut from such a young MC, and it resonates a lot more than the work of some rappers decades his senior." In March 2010, Fashawn appeared on the cover of XXL's Top 10 Freshmen issue, standing alongside Wiz Khalifa, J. Cole, Big Sean, Nipsey Hussle, Jay Rock, Freddie Gibbs, and among others. This represented a prestigious benchmark for upcoming rappers who demonstrated great potential and success.

Between 2010 and 2011, Fashawn continued to embark on various tours with Wiz Khalifa, Talib Kweli, and Brother Ali. He also performed at the Paid Dues and Rock The Bells festivals alongside Blu and Exile. On February 16, 2011, he released a mixtape called Higher Learning Vol. 2, which spawned two videos, "Down That Road" and "Big Dreams" produced by J. Cole.

On September 25, 2012, Fashawn and underground hip-hop legend Murs released a collaborative album called This Generation. Fashawn and Murs performed many tracks together at various shows to help promote the album, including Rock The Bells 2012. On November 17, 2012, Fashawn organized a hip-hop festival in his hometown of Fresno, California called Grizzly Fest 2012, which featured performances by himself, Murs, Husalah, Strong Arm Steady and many local talent and skateboarders. On November 20, 2012, he released the mixtape Champagne & Styrofoam Cups which included the song "Medicine Man" featuring Wiz Khalifa.

=== 2013–2014: His performance at the Pacquiao vs. Bradley II and signing to Nas' record label ===
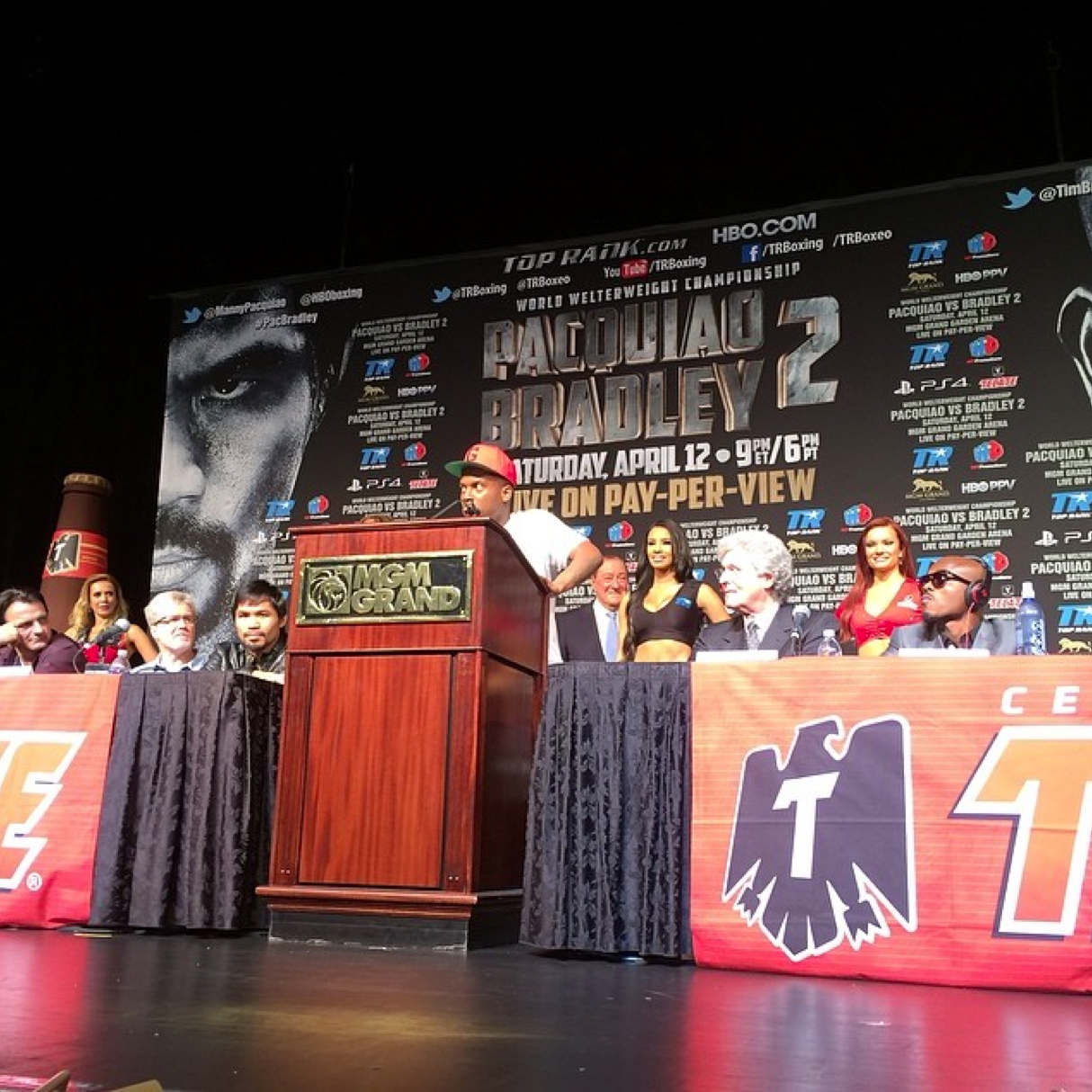
Fashawn speaking about his song "Champion" during the final press conference for the Manny Pacquiao vs. Timothy Bradley II championship rematch in Las Vegas.

In 2013, Fashawn continued to have a notable presence in various musical and mainstream outlets. He performed at various major hip-hop festivals such as Paid Dues, Rock the Bells, and Hip Hop Kemp where he joined Kendrick Lamar on stage for a duo freestyle session. On November 6, 2013, Fashawn released a video for a new song called "The Beginning", produced by Evidence and directed by both Evidence and Punit Dhesi. On December 9, 2013, Fashawn's artistry was the focus feature in a web episode of OTW Perspectives by Vans. On February 14, 2014, he released a new song "Ladies" for Valentine's Day, dedicating it to the women who struggle to stay strong and raise the next generation of kids.

On March 24, 2014, a rap icon Nas brought out Fashawn during the Mass Appeal showcase at SXSW 2014 in Austin, Texas, where Fashawn performed a new song "F.T.W." in front of the sold-out crowd. In 2014, during a Reddit "Ask Me Anything" session, Nas mentioned Fashawn as one of two contemporary artists who recently caught his ear (the other artist being Bishop Nehru).

On April 12, 2014, during the infamous WBO welterweight title rematch Manny Pacquiao vs. Timothy Bradley II at the MGM Grand Garden Arena, the champion Timothy Bradley appointed Fashawn to lead him into the ring while performing "Champion" produced by Exile. "What I like about this is that it is real hip-hop," Bradley said in regards to Fashawn's big performance. "It is about heart and character, not about partying it up in a club or all that kind of stuff that so many records are about."

On June 9, 2014, a variety of media outlets reported that Fashawn had officially signed to Nas' Mass Appeal Records. "Fashawn is one of the most underrated in the game," Nas said in a statement. "The world is gonna know soon. We're excited to have him as a part of the family."

On December 18, 2014, as a prelude to his upcoming sophomore album, Fashawn released an EP with The Alchemist titled FASH-ionably Late.

=== 2015–present: The Ecology ===
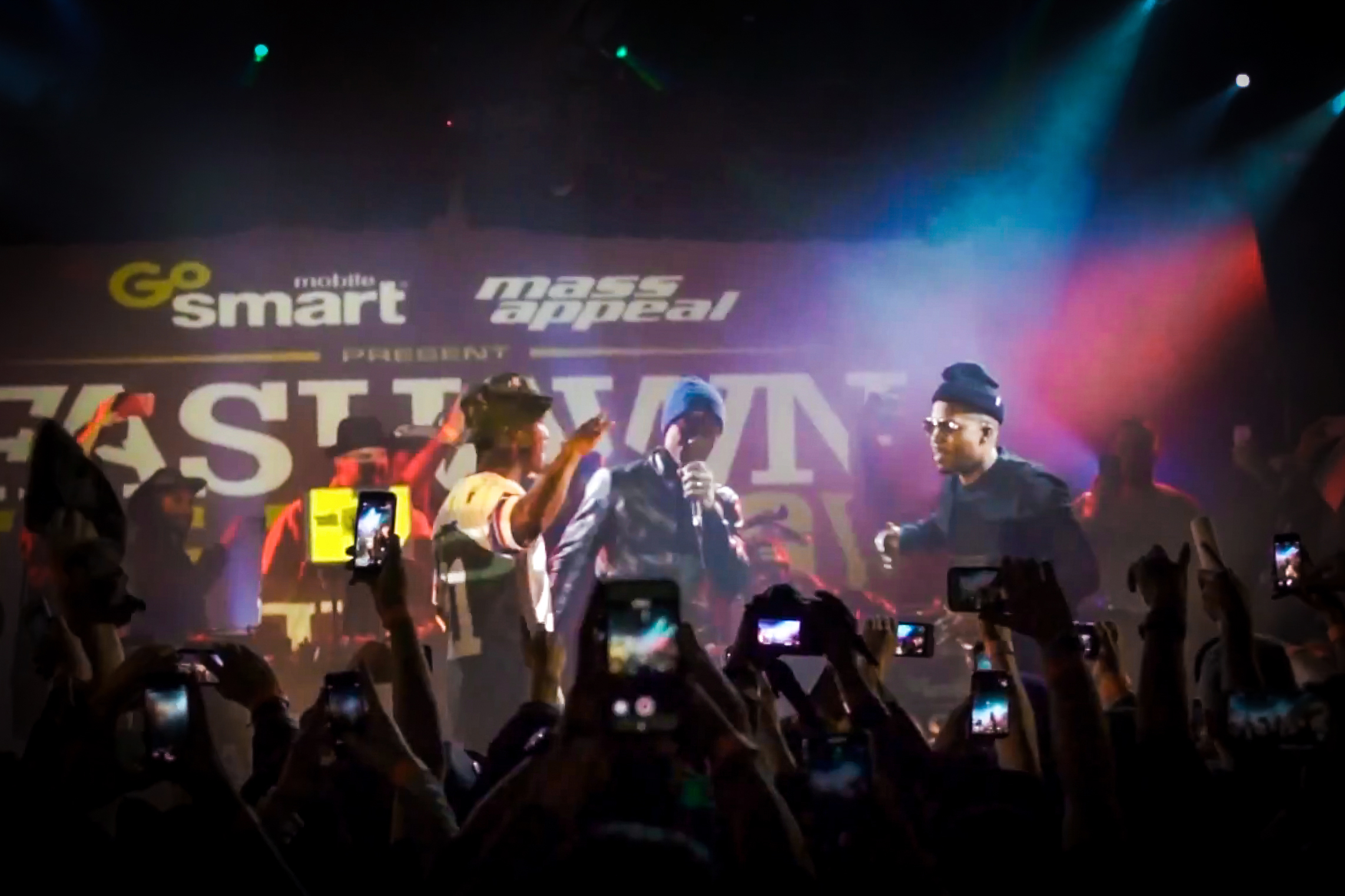
Fashawn is joined by Nas and Aloe Blacc during The Ecology album release concert in Los Angeles.

In 2014, after years of anticipation, it was announced Fashawn's second full-length solo album The Ecology was in the works. In an interview, Fashawn stated, "The Ecology has been a concept that started at least five years ago for me. I took the time to really work on this project because I knew that it would be important not just for my career, but for hip-hop. There could be no better time for all these blessings to be coming my way, and I'm just so happy to say that The Ecology will be coming out."

In January 2015, Fashawn announced The Ecology would be officially released on February 24, 2015, under Nas' Mass Appeal Records, and he would also embark on a nationwide tour, soon after its release. The official track list soon followed, which confirmed guest features by Nas (who also served as executive producer), Aloe Blacc, BJ the Chicago Kid, and Dom Kennedy. The production would be handled by Exile, The Alchemist and DJ Khalil, among others.

On February 20, 2015, Fashawn surprised eager fans by making The Ecology available for purchase on iTunes ahead of schedule. Physical CD and vinyl copies of The Ecology maintained the original release date of February 24, 2015. During its first week of release, The Ecology ranked among the Top 10 Hip-Hop Albums on iTunes. Since then, songs from the album, including "Something to Believe In", have been featured in various forms of popular media, including the Madden NFL, NBA Live, and WWE 2K video game series.

In February 2016, Fashawn joined forces with Black Thought, Murs, and Del the Funky Homosapien to record a new track called "Rise Up" for the Capcom video game Street Fighter V. A music video for the song was released prior to the game's launch date, and includes appearances by Fashawn and his fellow collaborators. On April 28, 2017, Fashawn released a single called "Rant".

== Discography ==
- Boy Meets World (2009)
- The Ecology (2015)
