= Paid Dues =

Music festival in California (2006–2013)

Paid Dues Independent Hip Hop Festival
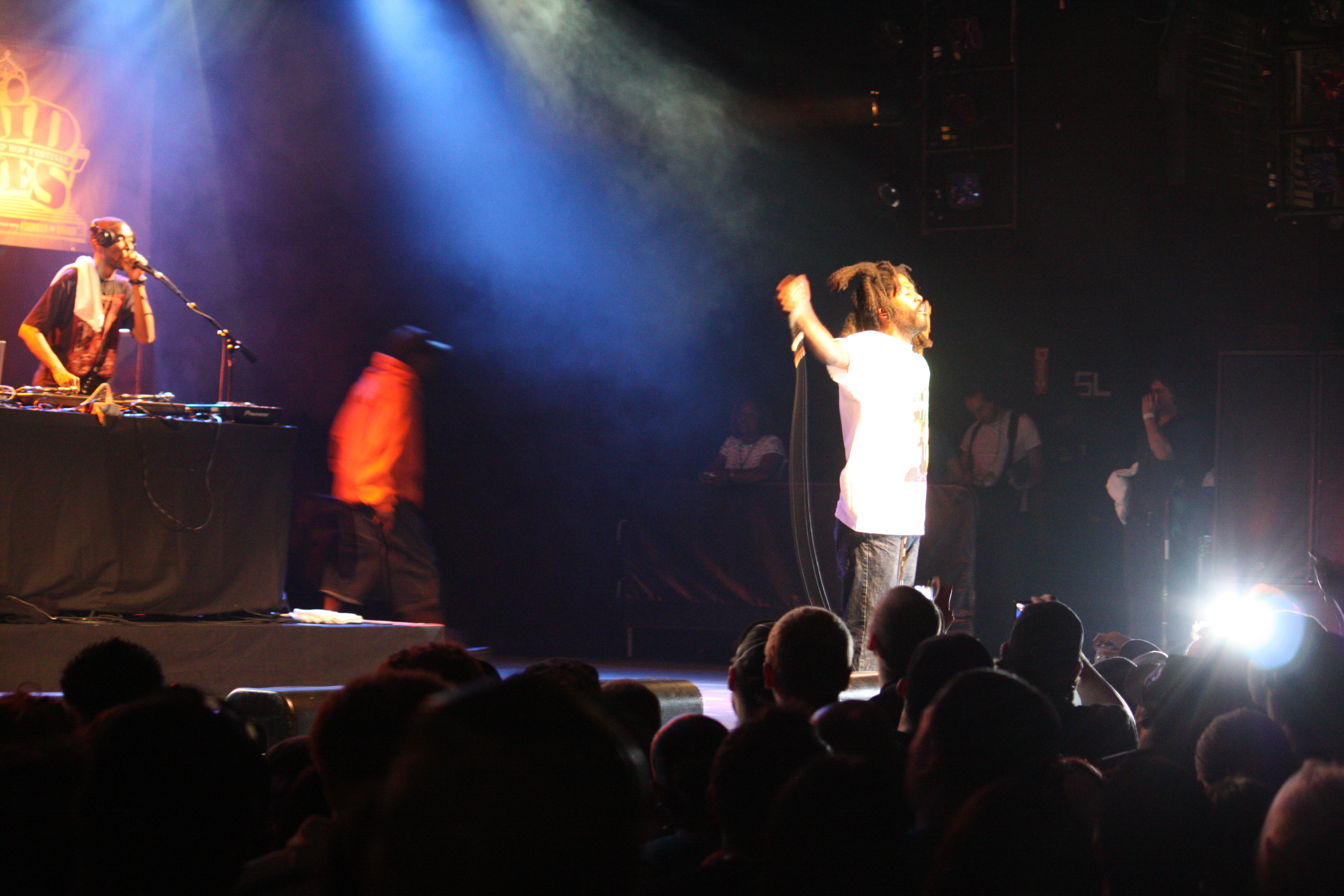
- Genre: Hip hop
- Dates: March; Summer
- Location: United States
- Years active: 2006–2013
- Founders: Guerilla Union; Murs
- Website: Official website

Paid Dues was an annual hip hop festival that took place in California, until the summer of 2006, when it was announced that the festival would travel to multiple locations. The last festival took place in 2013.

Paid Dues was an event presented by Murs 3:16 in association with Guerilla Union.

On March 11, 2006, the first Paid Dues festival sold out, with over 5,000 concert goers packing the Shrine Expo Center in Los Angeles. The line-up for the Paid Dues 2006 Festival included the debut live performance from Felt (Murs of Living Legends and Slug and Ant of Atmosphere).

== Paid Dues Festival 2006 ==
Date	City	Venue	Lineup
March 11	Los Angeles, California	Shrine Expo Center	Felt, Aesop Rock, Living Legends, El-P, Brother Ali, Cage, The Grouch, Blueprint, 3 Melancholy Gypsys, 2Mex, Chingo Bling, DJ Rhettmatic, Mr. Dibbs.

== Paid Dues Festival 2007 ==
Date	City	Venue	Lineup
March 24	San Bernardino, California	National Orange Show	Felt, Sage Francis, Blackalicious, Brother Ali, Jean Grae, Visionaries, Cage, Mr. Lif, Zion I & The Grouch, Devin the Dude, Evidence of Dilated Peoples w/ The Alchemist, Pigeon John, Los Nativos, Hangar 18.

== Paid Dues Tour 2007 ==
Following the success of the second annual PAID DUES festival in Southern California promoters MURS 3:16 in association with Guerilla Union (Rock The Bells, Cypress Hill's Smokeout) have announced they will tour.

"The national touring of PAID DUES is a dream come true. It’s what I had in mind when I first brought the idea to Guerilla Union--something like a Warped tour for underground hip-hop, where my friends and I could be outside in the daylight enjoying summer with our fans instead of cramped up in some dark smelly nightclub worried about staying up too late and being too tired for work the next morning,” states MURS. “It also provides a safe and comfortable environment in which the younger fans can be introduced to a proper live hip-hop show."

PAID DUES hit over 10 major markets across the country. It will pass through various sized venues ranging from 1,000 to 40,000 capacities. In New York City (July 28 and 29) and Los Angeles (August 11), PAID DUES will merge with the Rock The Bells festivals featuring headliners Rage Against the Machine and the Wu-Tang Clan.

Date	City	Venue
July 25	Chicago, IL	Congress Theater
July 27	Baltimore, MD	Pier Six Concert Pavilion
July 28	New York, NY	Randall's Island with Rock The Bells
July 29	New York, NY	Randall's Island with Rock The Bells
August 1	Minneapolis, MN	First Ave
August 4	Eugene, OR	Secret House Vineyard
August 5	San Francisco, CA	Bill Graham Civic Auditorium
August 7	Morrison, CO	Red Rocks Amphitheatre
August 9	Santa Fe, NM	Paolo Soleri Amphitheater
August 10	Mesa, AZ	Mesa Amphitheatre
August 11	San Bernardino, CA	Glen Helen Pavilion with Rock The Bells
August 12	San Diego, CA	Chula Vista Amphitheater parking lot with Rock the Bells
August 18	San Francisco, CA	McCovey Cove parking Lot with Rock The Bells
August 10	Mesa, AZ	Mesa Amphitheatre

Lineup
Felt, Living Legends, Sage Francis, Brother Ali, Cage, Mr. Lif, The Grouch & Eligh, Blueprint, Hangar 18.

== Paid Dues Festival 2008 ==
Date	City	Venue	Lineup
March 22	San Bernardino, California	National Orange Show	Sage Francis, Little Brother, Dilated Peoples, Jedi Mind Tricks, Living Legends, Hieroglyphics, Visionaries, Boot Camp Clik, Kool Keith, Busdriver, P.O.S, Mac Lethal, Fatlip & Omnil, Yak Ballz, B. Dolan, Isaiah.

== Paid Dues Tour 2008 ==
Date	City	Venue	Lineup
June 4	New York, NY	Nokia Theatre Times Square	Rakim, GZA, Blackalicious, Murs & 9th Wonder, Buckshot (Boot Camp Clik), Supernatural and Scratch, Kidz in the Hall, Yak Ballz.
June 7	Ft. Lauderdale, FL	Club Cinema	Rakim, Little Brother, Blackalicious, Buckshot (Boot Camp Clik), Supernatural and Scratch, Kidz in the Hall, Solillaquists of Sound.
June 13	Denver, CO	Fillmore Auditorium	De La Soul, Blackalicious, Sage Francis, Murs & 9th Wonder, Supernatural and Scratch, Kidz in the Hall, Yak Ballz, Braille, B. Dolan.
June 14	Berkeley, CA	Berkeley Community Theatre	**EVENT WAS CANCELED** Mos Def, De La Soul, Blackalicious, Little Brother, Sage Francis, Hieroglyphics, Supernatural and Scratch, Kidz in the Hall, Braille, B. Dolan.

== Paid Dues Festival 2009 ==
Date	City	Venue	Lineup
March 28	San Bernardino, California	National Orange Show	Atmosphere, Tech N9ne, Living Legends, Slaughterhouse (Joe Budden, Royce da 5'9", Joell Ortiz & Crooked I), Brother Ali, B-Real, The Grouch & Eligh, Cage, Eyedea & Abilities, Blu & Exile, LMNO, The Bayliens, VerBS. Hosted by 2Mex

== Paid Dues Festival 2010 ==
Date	City	Venue	Lineup
April 3	San Bernardino, California	NOS Events Center	Ice Cube, Freestyle Fellowship, Murs & 9th Wonder, Tech N9ne, Raekwon, Tha Dogg Pound, Jay Electronica, Dilated Peoples, Psycho Realm, Necro, People Under The Stairs, Del tha Funky Homosapien, Freeway, Jake One, Random Axe, R.A. the Rugged Man, Strong Arm Steady, Shape Shifters, Curren$y, Doomtree, Mac Lethal, Potluck, Redrapper, Afro Classics, Dom Kennedy, Hopie Spitshard, DJ Rowdy A, MC Prototype. Hosted by Angela Yee & DJ Wonder, DJ Val the Vandle & Dumbfoundead and The LA Leakers

== Paid Dues Festival 2011 ==
Saturday April 2 at NOS Events Center
Paid Dues Stage	Dues Paid Stage	GrindTime Now Stage
Black Star; Immortal Technique; Bun B Sage Francis; Asher Roth & Nottz are Rawth; Heavy Metal Kings; P.O.S; Dead Prez; Krizz Kaliko; Binary Star; Tabi Bonney; Eternia; Sab the Artist aka Musab; Hosted by Hollywood Holt and Million $ Mano	E-40; MURS; Andre Nickatina; Nipsey Hussle; Lil B the Based God; The Shock G Trio; Eligh; Mistah FAB; The Visionaries; Black Hippy; Dom Kennedy; U-n-i; King Fantastic; Skeme; Casey Veggies; Droop-E; Noa James; Hosted by Sunspot Jonz and the Marksmen, DJ Mark Luv and DJ Nu-Mark	Slaughterhouse; DJ Muggs vs. Sick Jacken, Bambu & Planet Asia; DJ Exile vs. Blu & Fashawn; Grieves w/ Budo; Opio; Chino XL; Invincible; Machina Muerte; Intuition; Dee-1; Blame One; GrindTime Now All Stars; Johnny Storm vs. Dizaster; Real Deal vs. Dirtbag Dan; DJ Freshh

== Paid Dues Festival 2012 ==
On the afternoon of December 13, 2011, Murs once again hosted a live chat session on uStream to announce the headliners for the next edition of the Paid Dues Festival: Wu-Tang Clan and Odd Future topped the bill, with more acts announced leading up to the festival. It continued the annual tradition by once again taking place at the NOS Events Center in San Bernardino, CA.

Saturday April 7 at NOS Events Center
Paid Dues Festival 2012

Wu-Tang Clan
Odd Future
Mac Miller
Living Legends
Dipset
Three 6 Mafia
Kendrick Lamar
Brother Ali
DJ Quik
Psycho Realm
Dilated Peoples
People Under The Stairs
Hieroglyphics
Boot Camp Clik
Lecrae
Cunninlynguists
Alchemist & Oh No are Gangrene
Macklemore & Ryan Lewis
LA Symphony
Crooked I
Mac Lethal
RA the Rugged Man
Ras Kass
Ab-Soul
Self Scientific
Overdoz
Swim Team
Surf Club
K-Flay
Rah Digga
Los Rakas
Psalm One
Oldominion
Trek Life
Tayf 3rd
Tiron & Ayomari
Moe Green
Alexander Spit
Rapsody
Curtiss King
Reverie
Kosha Dillz
Curtiss King
Moe Green
Hosted by Hollywood Holt x DJ Bizzy x Noa James X DJ Mark Luv x 2Mex x Madd Illz x DJ Foundation

- Grind Time Battles
- Dirtbag Dan v. Isaac
- Jonny Storm v. Real Talk

== Paid Dues Festival 2013 ==
Saturday March 30 at NOS Events Center
Paid Dues 2013

Black Hippy
Macklemore & Ryan Lewis
Tech N9ne
Immortal Technique
Trinidad James
Talib Kweli
Hopsin
Juicy J
Nipsey Hussle
Scarface
Dom Kennedy
Mobb Deep
De La Soul
Murs & Fashawn
Freddie Gibbs & Madlib
Grouch & Eligh
Souls of Mischief
Vinnie Paz and Ill Bill are Heavy Metal Kings
Joey Badass
Killer Mike
WC
Suga Free
Swollen Members
Problem & Badlucc
Smoke DZA
Jean Grae
Grieves
Binary Star
Grouch & Eligh
Skeme
The Internet
Ugly Duckling
Styles of Beyond
Chevy Woods
Elzhi
Vince Staples
Prof
Berner & Equipto
Speak
Flatbush Zombies
Sunspot Jonz & Boac
Terrace Martin
MED
Ellay Khule
Stevie Crooks
Dirtbag Dan
First Dirt
Hosted by
Holywood Holt
Black Cloud Music
Tayf 3rd & 2Mex
DJ Mark Luv
Monalisa
Jansport J
DJ R-Tistic

== See also ==
- List of hip hop music festivals
- Hip hop culture
