= Noa James =

American rapper

- Also known as: Young Orca; LOVEMONSTER; OrcaMane
- Born: December 31, 1984 (age 41)
- Origin: Inland Empire, California, United States
- Genres: Hip hop
- Occupations: Rapper; songwriter; promoter; entrepreneur
- Years active: 2008–present
- Label: Black Cloud Music
- Website: http://www.noajames.net

Jamie Wilson (born December 21, 1984), better known by his stage name Noa James, is a West Coast rapper based in the Inland Empire region of California, currently unsigned.

== Early life ==
Noa experienced more struggles than most people experience in their entire lives at a very young age ranging from his mother's incarceration after abandoning him, living in an orphanage, the deportation of his father, to the most prolific moment in his life; the passing of his grandfather.

== Music career ==
Rapping since the age of 13, Noa James began his musical journey as a battle rapper who quickly became known for his brutal punch lines and sharp tongue. After 5 years in the battle circuit, Noa realized that he wanted success as an artist and although he was young he knew he had a big story to tell.

Over the years, James' autobiographical lyrics have established him as a significant figure in storytelling. He is known for his personal character, often cited as a primary trait, Noa is often recognized within Southern California's Inland Empire underground hip hop movement.

Under Black Cloud Music, Noa, along with five other artists have been breaking the mold and starting a musical movement. After the release of several independent mixtapes before his Black Cloud affiliation in May 2010, Noa released his first official album on the label entitled Beautiful Darkness, which was well received and respectably noted by both his fans and peers. It was a project of love and labor and showed both sides of James' personality and elaborate mind. Beautiful Darkness is now available in several record stores throughout Los Angeles, the Inland Empire, and Las Vegas.

In May 2011, James released Intelligent, Elegant, Elephant: Humble Power, a project that generated quite a larger buzz digitally following his anticipated debut performance at a major hip hop music festival, Paid Dues in San Bernardino, California. During this time, James also was featured on the front cover of IE Weekly, a weekly magazine sister to LA Weekly, followed by his feature on XXL Magazine's The Break, in early July.

In the start of 2014, James departed ways from the independent label Black Cloud Music and is now a fully independent artist. Also March 2014, James put together the first Common Ground tour presented by his promotion company BrickToYaFace, which also featured Curtiss King and Stevie Crooks. This was just the beginning for James as an independent artist and going 100% with his promotion company as a talent buyer. As James continued to book more notable shows & continue to grow his Common Ground showcase through his promotion company BrickToYaFace he also released a collab project with Curtiss King. As a duo, they are Pterodactyl Jones. Pterodactyl Jones was released on iTunes and other major outlets in November under Murs’ new record label, Label316.

Continuing on his independent journey, in 2015 James hit the stage of Low End Theory, RhymeFest, Broke LA & he joined Murs, King Fantastic & Red Pill for the west coast half of Murs’ Have a Nice Life Tour. He also opened for Jurassic 5 at Club Nokia. With the success of his performances, James released his Dragon Ball Z inspired cult banger, Buu’s Hungry. He also released the collaboration EP, L.I.T (Leaders In Training/Love Is Truth) with Inland Empire artist Fredo; together they are P.S. (Productive Stoners).

2016 continued to be a busy year of performances for James. He got the opportunity to opened up for his idol DMX twice, he also opened up for 2Chainz, Gangsta Boo, Raekwon, Ras Kass, Curren$y, Bambu & Murs & 9th Wonder. With BrickToYaFace, James continued to organize events. They got the opportunity to curate a set for the Rhythm & Rhyme Experience which featured Inland Empire artist. James’ 7th independent release is his EP, 3 Bullets in a Golden Gun, which was exclusively with HipHopDX. After the release, James signed a deal with The Order Label, which is under Alpha Pup Records. He also started on a new adventure, he started hosting ORCAstrated Podcast w/ Lesa J., a podcast for independent artist available on iTunes. 2016 was a pivotal year for James, his love for curating shows came to a test when the original venue for his well acclaimed showcase Common Ground ended up closing in September.

James kicked off 2017 performing at the Tucson Hip Hop Festival in AZ, becoming an official SXSW artist and performing with The Cool Kids for a SXSW official showcase. Under The Order Label, he released his debut EP, Peace of Cake & also a collaboration EP, GnarlyOrca, with label mate Cam Gnarly. Going into 2017, James managed to find a new home for Common Ground until he decided to fully end the showcase when the new venue closed in July. It was a bittersweet decision that came at an important time in his career. With the end of James curating events with BrickToYaFace, he’s focused on his career. James made his “on screen” debut with the rap competition show, Versus on the WAV Media app; which gave him a taste of a hectic schedule.

== Performances ==
James has performed at venues large and small all over the United States. In early 2011, after campaigning heavily for a spot at the Paid Dues festival with the support of fans, James was asked by independent hip hop artist Murs to perform.

In the Summer of 2011, James, along with a roster of indie artists throughout the Inland Empire, embarked on the Humble Power Tour where they toured and performed throughout Southern California. This was James' first tour and a tour he booked on his own.

Continuing with that momentum, James performed at Culture Magazine 420 Event in 2011 & 2012, House of Blues Sunset for the Paid Dues Pre-Party 2012, toured across the entire United States with Murs, Prof & Fashawn in 2013 for 2 months & 50+ shows, independently booked his second tour it's The Common Ground Tour 2014, performed at the Sunset Strip Music Festival in 2014, performed at the legendary Low End Theory 2014-2017, RhymeFest at the Fox Theater Pomona 2014, Broke LA formerly Brokechella 2015, second national tour with Murs for Have a Nice Life Tour 2015, Tucson Hip Hop Festival 2017, SXSW official showcase with The Cool Kids 2017, independently booked his third tour, Pacific Breeze Tour with Vel The Wonder and more.

James has opened up for Action Bronson, Jurassic 5, Freddie Gibbs, Planet Asia, Murs, Dipset, Fashawn, Curren$y, Dom Kennedy, Raekwon, Pharohe Monch, Del the Funky Homosapien, 2 Chainz, Dipset, Chino XL, Black Milk, YG, Pac Div, Blu, G Perico, Eureka the Butcher, Skeme, Kurupt, Bambu, RJ, Mann, DJ Icy Ice, Bad Lucc, Gangsta Boo, Kxng Crooked, The Cool Kids, Lil Debbie, Denzel Curry, Dizzy Wright, King Lil G, DMX, Audio Push & more (2011-current).

In California James has performed at The Roxy, The Novo, NOS Center, The Union, The Observatory, Fox Theater Pomona, The Glass House, HOB Sunset & Anaheim, Belasco Theater, Slim’s, The Catalyst, The Velvet Room, Fulton 55, SLO Brew, and more (2011-current).

James has left his mark on the stages in these states: Arizona, California, Colorado, Florida, Georgia, Idaho, Illinois, Indiana, Kansas, Massachusetts, Minnesota, Missouri, Nebraska, Nevada, New Mexico, New York, Ohio, Oklahoma, Oregon, Texas, Utah, Vermont, Washington, Wisconsin & Wyoming.

== Philanthropy ==
James also holds various charity events every year to support programs and shelters in the surrounding communities, including his annual "Toys for Tots" event to support Veronica's House of Mercy, a nonprofit organization, as well as food drives to give hope to those in need.

== Discography ==
Albums

- Sounds of a Monster LP (2009)
- Beautiful / Darkness (2010)
- James For the Win Vol. 1 (2011)
- Pterodactyl Jones (2014) (with Curtiss King) (as Pterodactyl Jones)
- Granny Said (2018)
- Majestic Travels Of OrcaMane & OGIE (2019) (with NugLife)
- Dirty Gospel (2020) (with Cas1)
- King Kaiju (2022) (with Local Astronauts)
- The Sea King (2022)
- King Orca (2024) (with AudioKing)

EPs

- In Blanka Mode EP (2009)
- Intelligent Elegant Elephant: Humble Power (2011)
- The Adventures Of Young Orca (2013)
- Fat Boy Love Letter EP (2013) (with Gypsy Mamba)
- Leaders.In.Training/Love Is Truth (2015) (with Fredo) (as P.S. - Productive Stoners)
- 3 Bullets In A Golden Gun EP (2016)
- Peace Of Cake (2017)
- GnarlyOrca (2017) (with Cam Gnarly)
- Cherry Yellow Glow (2018)
- Phone Rang / Dumb Lit (2018) (with Aye Brook)
- The Love Was Never Hidden (2020)
- OrcaMania 30,000 EP (2020)
