= Black Cloud Music =

American independent music label

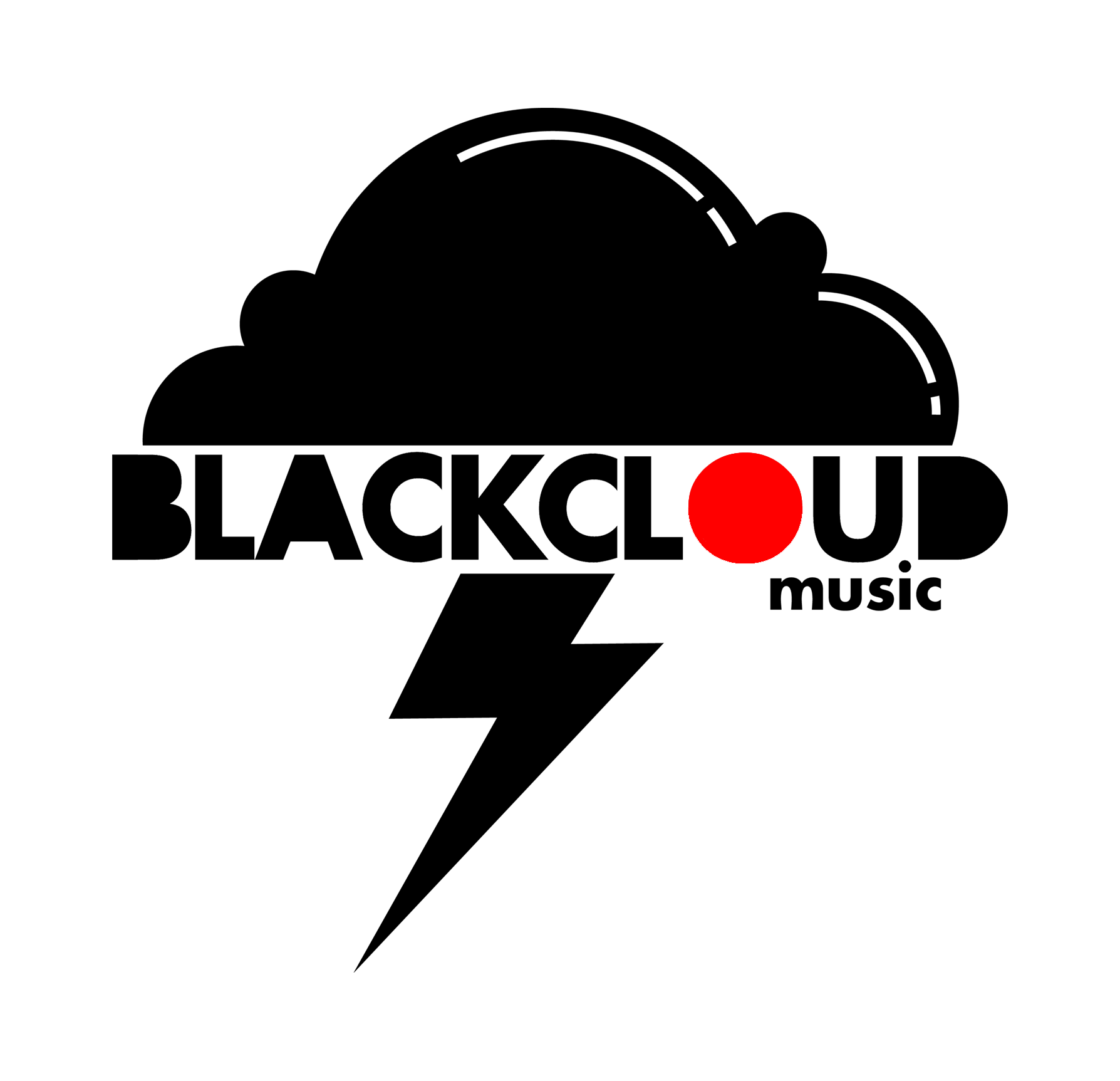
- Founded: 2006
- Founder: Santiago Garcia (Jynxx)
- Genre: Hip hop
- Country of origin: United States
- Location: San Bernardino, California
- Official website: blackcloudmusic.com

Black Cloud Music is an American independent music label based in San Bernardino, California. It was founded in 2006 by Santiago Garcia (Jynxx) and Yasin. Black Cloud Music is mainly composed of Inland Empire natives including Noa James, Curtiss King, and Faimkills. Black Cloud Music is considered one of the leading independent hip-hop labels in the Inland Empire.

== History ==
In 2006, Black Cloud Music began with the release of its first compilation, Beats and Life, produced by founder and producer, Jynxx, and featured various emcees such as Dirty Birdy, Mykill Myers, and Bocafloja. The following year, Jynxx collaborated with his longtime friend and fellow emcee, E Dubb to form the group, SOP and released a full-length album, Music 4 Da Deaf & The Lyrically Challenged.

Between 2008 and 2009, Black Cloud Music began to build its roster, with the addition of several local artists that Jynxx met at local hip-hop events such as It’s The Common Ground. With the addition of Noa James, Curtiss King, Art Barz and Faimkills, the label focused on Noa James’s debut album, Beautiful Darkness, released on iTunes in 2009.

The following year, Black Cloud Music released another compilation, 12 Days on Cloud 9, which featured all of the artists on the roster, as well as a few others. In 2011, Noa James was invited to perform at the 6th annual Paid Dues Independent Hip-Hop Festival in San Bernardino, California. That same year, Black Cloud Music added David May and Phantom Thrett to its roster.

In 2012, Black Cloud Music artist Curtiss King was invited to perform at the 7th annual Paid Dues Independent Hip-Hop Festival, while Noa James was invited to host the Dues Paid Stage. King continued to build his momentum while Black Cloud Music focused on the release his debut album Atychiphobia: The Fear of Failure, which debuted at #61 on the iTunes hip hop charts. Also in 2012, Kid Disko became the official DJ for Black Cloud Music.

In 2013, Black Cloud Music embarked on its first national tour with independent hip-hop icon, Murs, along with Fashawn and Prof on the Road To Paid Dues Tour 2013. This tour led up to the 8th annual Paid Dues Independent Hip-Hop Festival, at which Black Cloud Music hosted the Monster Energy Stage.

Currently, Black Cloud Music is set to release Phantom Thrett’s debut album Broken Winter as well as a new album by Faimkills, entitled, THRASHED OUT later this year.

== Artists ==
- Noa James
- Curtiss King
- Faimkills
- Jynxx
- David May
- Phantom Thrett
- DJ Kid Disko
- Art Barz
- Yasin
- SOP

== Discography ==
- 2009: Black Friday Tape
- 2010: 12 Days on Cloud9
- 2013: Cloud 9: The Compilation Vol.1
