= List of killings by law enforcement officers in the United States, March 2014 =

This is a list of people reported killed by non-military law enforcement officers in the United States in March 2014, whether in the line of duty or not, and regardless of reason or method. The listing documents the occurrence of a death, making no implications regarding wrongdoing or justification on the part of the person killed or officer involved. Killings are arranged by date of the incident that caused death. Different death dates, if known, are noted in the description. The table below lists 100 people.

== March 2014 ==
Date	Name (Age) of Deceased	Race	State (City)	Description
2014-03-31	Kimberly Dawn Whitworth (28)	White	Tryon, NC	
2014-03-31	James Clark (43)	White	Johnson City, NY	
2014-03-31	Shirley Joyce Brown (74)	White	Covington, GA	
2014-03-30	Zikarious Flint (20)	Black	Columbus, GA	
2014-03-29	Raason Shaw (20)	Black	Illinois (Chicago)	
2014-03-28	Anthony Ray Osburn (40)	Unknown race	Lincolnton, NC	
2014-03-28	Christopher Leo Knight (35)	Native Hawaiian and Pacific Islander	Salt Lake City, UT	
2014-03-28	Jason Roy Wilson (25)	White	Chino Hills, CA	
2014-03-28	Bryant Augustus "Fluke" Stallings (35)	Black	New Bern, NC	
2014-03-28	Tracy L. McCraw (25)	Black	Kentucky (Louisville)	
2014-03-27	Larry Dale Plaster (43)	White	Sayre, OK	
2014-03-27	Lonnie Duane "L.D." Baker (58)	Unknown race	Glen Rose, TX	
2014-03-27	Eduardo Rodriguez (19)	Hispanic	Port Arthur, TX	
2014-03-27	Antoquan T. Watson (27)	Black	New Jersey (Atlantic City)	Antoquan Watson was shot and killed after an exchange of gunfire between him and police.
2014-03-26	Christopher McDaniel (41)	White	Oildale, CA	
2014-03-26	Steven Charles Corkery (30)	White	Spokane, Washington	30-year-old armed robbery suspect, Stephen Corkery was shot and killed by Spokane police. Corkery was shot after police say they gave several commands to come out of the home, when he did police say he did so holding a firearm and advanced towards police.
2014-03-25	Chieu-di Thi Vo (47)	Asian	Greensboro, NC	
2014-03-25	Brendan K. Wright (41)	White	Rice, WA	
2014-03-25	Charles D. Welborn (42)	White	San Angelo, TX	
2014-03-25	Sakhar Williye Robinson (20)	Black	Salisbury, NC	
2014-03-25	Israel Rondon (65)	White	Middleburg, OH	
2014-03-25	Alfred Redwine (30)	Black	New Mexico (Albuquerque)	Redwine was shot after police were called by a 14-year-old girl who said he threatened her with a gun. Police said he fired a shot during the confrontation.
2014-03-24	Michael Valentino (27)	White	California (Hollywood Hills)	Police converged on a home after receiving a domestic disturbance call. Police exchanged gunfire with the suspect until he was mortally wounded. One LAPD officer was injured during the confrontation.
2014-03-24	DeAndre Lloyd Starks-Anderson (27)	Black	Tulsa, Oklahoma	At 5:22pm, Tulsa Police Dispatch received a call that the Narcotics unit was serving a search warrant at a residence. At 5:23pm, the second call came in of shots fired. Deandre was shot once when the officer said he reached for a weapon and was moving in a threatening manner. Deandre was sent to St John's Medical Center and later succumbed to his injuries. In March of 2016, Deandre's family filed a lawsuit against the Tulsa Police Department, when it was determined that no drugs or weapons were found in the home.
2014-03-23	Willie Neall Harden (25)	Black	Arizona (Phoenix)	
2014-03-23	Gail Dean Fairless (73)	White	Oklahoma (Oklahoma City)	
2014-03-22	Brian McLeod (25)	White	University Place, WA	
2014-03-22	Alejandro "Alex" Nieto (28)	Hispanic	San Francisco, California	Officers responding to calls about a man with a gun approached him on a paved pedestrian path at Bernal Heights Park. Nieto appeared to draw a Taser as the officers approached, and the officers opened fire. Nieto was shot 14 times by four San Francisco Police Department officers. The officers believed that the Taser was a real firearm.
2014-03-22	Douglas Cooper (18)	Black	Providence, Rhode Island	Officers on a vehicle patrol happened upon a number of individuals with guns drawn on each other on Canton Street. Several of the individuals fled the scene as the officers identified themselves as police, but Cooper pointed his weapon at the unmarked Providence Police car and fired. Three Providence Police officers took cover and returned fire, killing Cooper.
2014-03-21	Monty Wayne Barker (74)	White	Los Angeles, CA	
2014-03-21	Rajsaun McCray (29)	Black	Aberdeen, MD	
2014-03-21	William Slade Sullivan (44)	White	Round Rock, TX	
2014-03-21	Aaron Dino Smith Jr. (51)	Black	Nashville, TN	
2014-03-21	Homer Ken Warren (21)	Black	Jacksonville, Florida	
2014-03-20	Angel Ruiz (42)	Hispanic	Salinas, California	Police shot and killed Ruiz after he allegedly threatened them with a replica firearm outside a restaurant.
2014-03-20	Hector Chairez (40)	Hispanic	Big Sur, CA	
2014-03-20	Willie D. Michilak (30)	White	Nebraska (Omaha)	
2014-03-20	Robert Moreno Jr. (21)	White	Anaheim, CA	
2014-03-19	Errol Chang (34)	Asian	Pacifica, California	Chang was shot eight times and killed by a Daly City police SWAT team who were outside the home, after he stabbed an officer in the arm at the end of a six-hour standoff, authorities said.
2014-03-19	Chaney, Ricardo (42)		California (Cleone)	Chaney, a suspect in the murder of a 79-year-old acquaintance in Eugene, Oregon and an attempted murder of a store owner, shot and killed Mendocino County Sheriff's Deputy Ricky Del Fiorentino with a rifle as he was being encountered by officers. Chaney was then shot and killed by a police officer.
2014-03-19	Joe Gorden (50)	White	Aurora, CO	
2014-03-18	Winfield Carlton Fisher III (32)	Black	Salisbury, MD	
2014-03-18	Ryan Charles Deitrich (21)	White	Parkville, MD	
2014-03-18	Craig Uran (26)	White	Arizona (Phoenix)	
2014-03-18	Daquan Hendrix (19)	Black	Washington, D.C.	Metropolitan Police and Federal Agents were preparing to serve a homicide arrest warrant on the suspect when he emerged from a residence firing a handgun and was fatally shot by police.
2014-03-17	Hallis Kinsey (26)	Black	Texas (Houston)	
2014-03-17	Kenny Roger Drake (52)	White	Cumming, GA	
2014-03-17	William L. Daniels (29)	White	Poughkeepsie, NY	
2014-03-16	James M. Boyd (38)	White	New Mexico (Albuquerque)	
2014-03-16	Ronald Wayne Tate (58)	Unknown race	Jean, NV	
2014-03-16	Daniel Martin (47)	Black	Lawton, OK	
2014-03-16	Deosaran Maharaj (51)	Asian	Pompano Beach, Florida	
2014-03-16	Brian Garber (28)	White	Lexington, Ohio	Sheriff's deputies were called for a domestic violence complaint and were told Garber had a gun. The deputies shot Garber 14 times after speaking with him for 90 seconds and determining him a threat. He was found to be unarmed but a grand jury returned no indictments against sheriff's deputies who shot him.
2014-03-14	Jimmy Eugene Barker (60)	White	Lake City, Florida	
2014-03-14	Derral Kenneth "Kenny" Mosby (36)	White	Ridgefield, WA	
2014-03-13	Raul Altimirano Suarez Jr. (26)	Hispanic	Arizona (Phoenix)	
2014-03-13	Stanley Preston Thompson (60)	Unknown race	Yuba City, CA	
2014-03-12	Kelly Vern Mark Swoboda (49)	White	Portland, Oregon	Robbery suspect Swoboda was shot and killed by police; family reported that he suffered from mental illness and drug addictions.
2014-03-12	Eric Paul Andrews (25)	White	Highland, CA	
2014-03-12	Troy David Whisnant (38)	White	Morgantown, NC	
2014-03-11	Michael Snyder (57)	White	Florida (Washington)	
2014-03-11	Boyd, James (38)		New Mexico (Albuquerque)	James Boyd shooting. Albuquerque police fatally shot James Boyd, 38, in the Sandia foothills following an hours-long standoff and after he threatened to kill officers with a small knife, authorities said. He died after officers fired stun guns, bean bags and six live rounds, authorities initially claimed. But a helmet-camera video showed Boyd, who claimed to be a federal agent, agreeing to walk down the mountain with them, gathering his things and having his back turned to the officers when they killed Boyd. On January 12, 2015, Sandy and Perez were charged with murder.
2014-03-11	Albert William Keyes (53)	White	Kentucky (Louisville)	Deputies went to the Bluegrass Mobile Home Park to serve a felony warrant on a wanted individual. Police came into contact with Keyes, who lived at the target residence, and who insisted he was not the intended person of the warrant. When asked for identification, Keyes exited his home and fled the scene in his pickup. Police pursued Keyes until he stopped, left his vehicle and pointed a knife at the responding officers. He was then fatally shot by police. Upon further investigation, the police confirmed to the press that Keyes was not the subject of the warrant. The person of interest was another man who had moved out of the trailer park last year.
2014-03-10	Benjamin Shannon (35)	White	Rochester, NH	
2014-03-10	Name Withheld (30)	Unknown race	Michigan (Detroit)	
2014-03-10	Brian P. Spooner (23)	Unknown race	Oberlin, KS	
2014-03-10	John Weipert (47)	White	St. Joseph, MO	
2014-03-10	Andrew Rael (25)	Hispanic	Arizona (Tempe)	
2014-03-10	David L. Robinson (38)	Black	North Las Vegas, Nevada	The homeless Mr. Robinson was walking when stopped by Officer Raymond Lopez. Robinson was uncooperative and backed away from Lopez. He was later shot in the head in the backyard of an abandoned home. Relatives of the slain man have filed a civil rights lawsuit against the police department.
2014-03-09	Floyd Gene Hodge (31)	Black	Sebring, Florida	
2014-03-09	Erdenebileg Sambuunyam (40)	Asian	Illinois (Sleepy Hollow)	Police went to a domestic disturbance incident and attempted to restrain Sambuunyam, who had attacked and injured two people. Sambuunyam tried to cut the officers with a knife and was subsequently shot.
2014-03-09	Herbert Wayne Morehead (60)	White	Lyerly, GA	
2014-03-09	Justin Aguilar (15)	Hispanic	Longview, TX	
2014-03-09	Gordon E. Samel (52)	White	Wasilla, AK	
2014-03-08	John Harmon (50)	Unknown race	Sacramento, California	Police responded to a report of a man wielding a knife aboard a light-rail train. Police confronted Harmon and were unable to restrain him with a Taser. Harmon then charged towards the officers with his knife and was shot several times.
2014-03-08	Emerson Crayton Jr. (21)	Black	Alexander City, AL	
2014-03-07	JoAnna Miller (34)	White	Norristown, PA	
2014-03-07	Veronica Canter (48)	White	California (Fresno)	Police responded to a 3:30 PM call about a woman behaving erratically near the caller's apartment. When the police arrived they found Canter inside the man's apartment. Although the two were acquainted, the woman did not live at the apartment. The two officers, one armed with a taser and one with a handgun, entered the apartment and found Canter armed with a kitchen knife. As Canter approached the officers she was hit with the taser but did not stop. She was then shot two times. She died at the scene.
2014-03-06	Roy Eugene Irvin	Black	Texas (Houston)	
2014-03-06	Clifford Crowe (55)	White	Knoxville, TN	
2014-03-06	James Stutchman (28)	White	Okmulgee, OK	
2014-03-06	Kenny Clinton Walker (23)	Black	Los Angeles, CA	
2014-03-06	Lonnie Gene Roberts (47)	White	Hamilton, Montana	Roberts called officers regarding an issue he was having with his wife, who was not home at the time of the incident. He became agitated and walked across the room towards a shotgun and was warned not to pick it up. He was then shot by Deputy Todd Wofford, Jr., a 3-year veteran of the Ravalli County Sheriff's Office. He died at the scene.
2014-03-05	Eddy Barrios (23)	Hispanic	Florida (LaBelle)	
2014-03-05	Andrew Sizemore (27)	White	Indiana (Indianapolis)	
2014-03-05	Robert James Gonzales (23)	Hispanic	Pueblo, CO	
2014-03-05	Robert J. Storay (52)	Black	Little Rock, AR	
2014-03-05	Gary E. Wenzel (50)	White	Bourbon, MO	
2014-03-04	Charles Muse III (44)	White	Clawson, MI	
2014-03-04	Rebecca Lynn Oliver (24)	White	Duncan, SC	
2014-03-04	Federico Osorio (20)	Hispanic	Miami, Florida	
2014-03-03	Michael Cravey (28)	White	Gainesville, Florida	
2014-03-03	Lew G. Tyree II (41)	Black	Brandon, Florida	
2014-03-03	Victor White III (22)	Black	Louisiana (Iberia Parish)	White, a black man from Iberia Parish, Louisiana, died in police custody. Authorities said the cause of death was a single, self-inflicted, gunshot wound in the back, fired by White while he sat handcuffed in the back of a police cruiser. But according to the Iberia Parish coroner, White had indeed shot himself, but in the front, not the back. The fatal wound was a gunshot to the right side of his chest, near the nipple. Federal authorities are currently conducting their own investigation.
2014-03-03	William Thornton (28)	White	Arizona (Phoenix)	
2014-03-03	Clay Spotted Bear (19)	Native American	Browning, MT	
2014-03-02	Gabriella Monique Nevarez (22)	Hispanic	California (Citrus Heights)	Officers pulled over a suspected stolen vehicle occupied by Nevarez, who allegedly rammed a police car and fled. After a pursuit, police say Nevarez rammed a second police vehicle before officers shot and killed her.
2014-03-02	Ryan Matthew Shannon (41)	White	California (Antelope)	Officers were responding to a report of shots fired when they found Shannon allegedly carrying an assault rifle while walking down the street. Police say Shannon refused to drop the weapon and instead pulled out a handgun and pointed it at them. Two Sacramento County deputies shot and killed him.
2014-03-02	Robert Joseph Minjarez Jr. (30)	White	Lafayette, LA	
2014-03-01	Anthony Kovac (21)	White	O'Fallon, MO	

== See also ==
- Death in custody § United States
- Henry A. Wallace Police Crime Public Database
- List of cases of police brutality
- List of countries with annual rates and counts for killings by law enforcement officers
- List of law enforcement officers killed in the line of duty in the United States
- List of law enforcement officers convicted for an on-duty killing in the United States
- List of shootings by US immigration agents
- List of police reforms related to the George Floyd protests
- List of unarmed African Americans killed by law enforcement officers in the United States
- Lists of killings by law enforcement officers
- Police brutality in the United States
- Police misconduct § United States
- Police riot § United States
- Police use of deadly force in the United States
