= Killing of Alex Nieto =

Police shooting in San Francisco in 2014

Death of Alex Nieto
- Location of the incident in Bernal Heights.
- Date: March 21, 2014
- Time: Approximately 7:00 PM (PST)
- Location: Bernal Heights Park, San Francisco, California, U.S.
- Participants: Roger Morse, Nathan Chew, Jason Sawyer, Richard Schiff (officers); Alex Nieto (death)
- Deaths: Alejandro "Alex" Nieto
- Charges: None filed
- Litigation: Lawsuit (Nieto v. City of San Francisco), jury found officers not responsible

Alejandro "Alex" Nieto was a man who was shot and killed by four San Francisco Police Department officers on March 21, 2014, in the Bernal Heights neighborhood of San Francisco, California. Nieto was a bouncer at a local nightclub, and the shooting took place before he was to start work that evening. A couple called 911 when they saw him sitting on a bench and saw Nieto's taser. Nieto was wearing a taser, and the police officers alleged that Nieto pointed the taser at them. The responding police officers also said they believed that the taser was a firearm.

The San Francisco County District Attorney's Office declined to file criminal charges against the four officers involved in the shooting. Nieto's family filed a federal civil rights lawsuit, alleging wrongful death. In March 2016, a jury cleared the four officers of all charges.

== Background ==
Nieto, 28, was born on March 3, 1986, in the Bernal Heights neighborhood of San Francisco, California, to parents Refugio Nieto and Elvira Nieto (née Rodriguez), Mexican immigrants from the town of Tarimoro, Guanajuato.

In 2007, Nieto obtained a California state license to work as a security guard. Nieto graduated from the City College of San Francisco, with a concentration in criminal justice. During this time he held an internship at the City of San Francisco's juvenile probation department.

== Event ==
Nieto worked as a bouncer at a local nightclub. Around 7:00 pm on the night of March 21, 2014, he was sitting on a bench of the hilltop park called "Bernal Heights Park", eating his dinner, a burrito, before heading for work, he was wearing a red San Francisco 49ers jacket, black 49ers cap, white t-shirt, and black pants. Under his 49ers jacket, he wore a holstered taser that he used for his job as a bouncer. A local resident named Evan Snow was walking his dog near Nieto. Snow's dog Luna was unleashed, barking and chased Nieto up onto a bench trying to get at his food. Nieto and Snow conversed briefly and went their separate ways. Snow allegedly used racial slurs and texted a friend that "in another state like Florida, I would have been justified in shooting Mr. Nieto that night." Tim Isgitt and partner Justin Fritz were walking their dog shortly thereafter. Noting a rattled Nieto who had his hand on a handgun, Fritz called 911, reporting a man with a handgun wearing a red jacket.

One witness who did see Nieto shortly after Isgitt and Fritz, longtime Bernal Heights resident Robin Bullard who was walking his own dog in the park, testified that there was nothing alarming about him. "He was just sitting there," Bullard said.

Police Lieutenant Jason Sawyer and Officer Richard Schiff responded to the call and confronted Nieto as he was walking on a path in the same park. They testified that he pointed the taser at them when asked to show his hands, prompting them to open fire on Nieto. Officers Roger Morse and Nathan Chew provided backup, and later fired 14 rounds at Nieto, claiming they saw muzzle fire. According to a report by the city's District Attorney George Gascón, the officers fired a total of 59 shots: Schiff went through an entire magazine, shooting 23 bullets at Nieto while Sawyer fired 20 bullets, allegedly in response to Nieto pointing a taser, which they mistook for a pistol.

== Lawsuit ==
Alex's parents retained the Law Offices of John Burris and filed a federal civil rights claim arguing the police wrongfully shot their son. The trial ended on March 10, 2016, and a jury unanimously cleared the four officers of all charges. It was found that the taser's clock, which showed that the weapon's trigger had been pulled. Nieto's prior issues with mental health were discussed, as toxicology reports found he was not on medication when he was killed. Also discussed were two separate incidents in 2011 when Nieto had contact with law enforcement and resulted in 72-hour mental health holds. The family argued that the police used excessive force and that there was contradictory evidence and details about what happened.

== Response ==
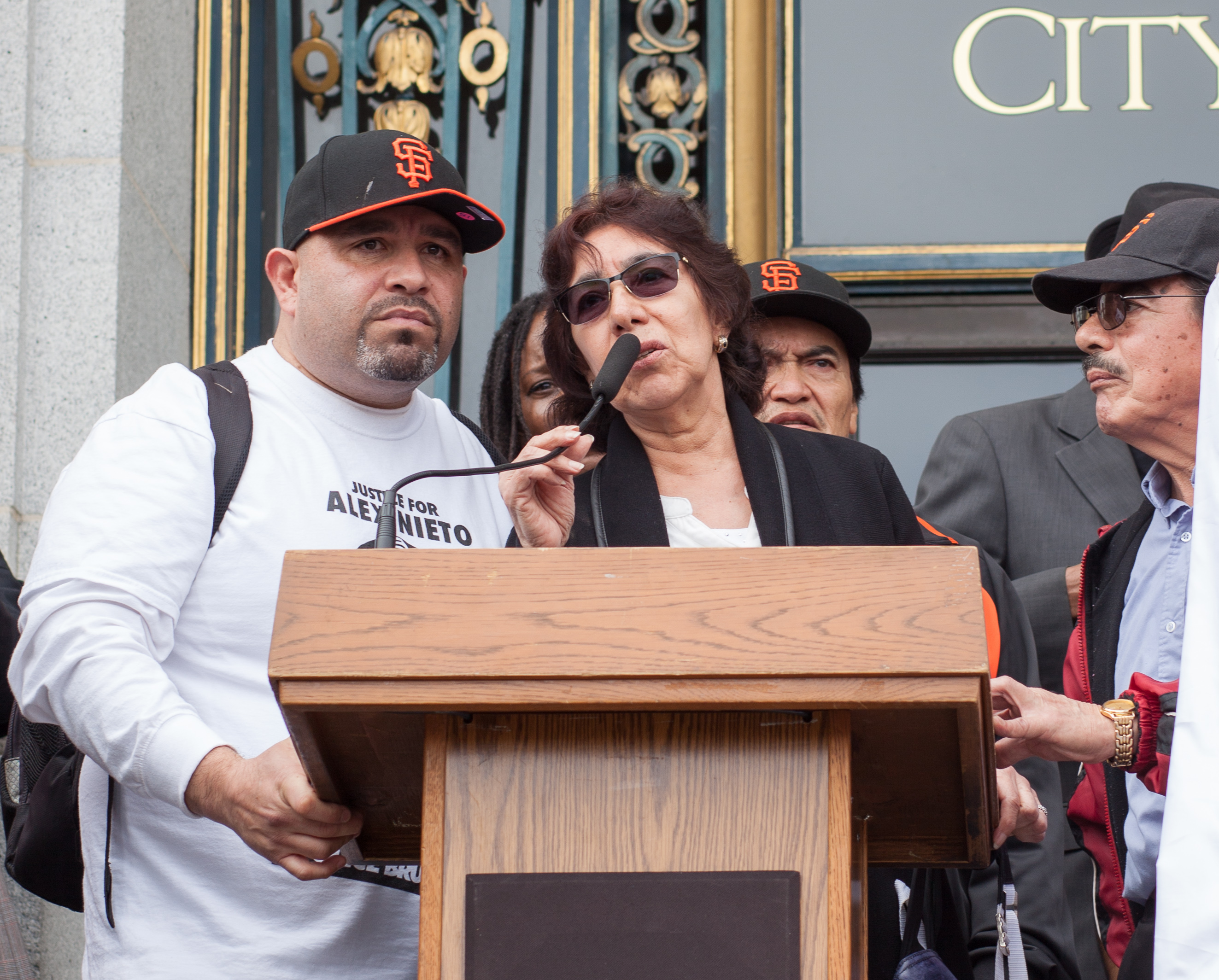
Elvira Nieto, mother of Alex Nieto, speaks at a March 2016 protest against police violence

Nieto's death and the verdict sparked waves of demonstrations and rallies in the Bay Area, protesting against police brutality and excessive use of force against minority groups amidst calls for SFPD Chief Greg Suhr's resignation. In March 2016, on the day before Nieto's trial started, San Francisco public school children staged a walk out from school in protest.

The protests and the ensuing debate included calls for policing reforms and the threats faced by Latino communities increasingly displaced by gentrification in the city. After the publication of the verdict, the American Civil Liberties Union of Northern California published a piece pointing at racial bias within SFPD and calling for urgent policing reform. On April 21, 2016, five protesters started a 17-day hunger strike in San Francisco's Mission District to demonstrate against recent police killings, including Alex Nieto's death.

On May 19, 2016, Police Chief Suhr resigned after an officer-involved killing of a 29-year-old woman. Jessica Williams was shot by San Francisco police in the Bayview-Hunters Point neighborhood during a car chase.

== In popular culture ==
- Singer Chuck Prophet memorialized Nieto in his song "Alex Nieto."

== See also ==
- Frisco Five
- History of the San Francisco Police Department
- List of killings by law enforcement officers in the United States, March 2014
- Shooting of Andy Lopez
- Bernal Heights, San Francisco
