= Curtiss King =

American rapper

- Curtiss King performing during the 2012 Paid Dues Festival

Background information
- Also known as: Baby Sinbad
- Born: Dwan Howard
- Origin: Inland Empire, California, United States
- Genre: Hip hop
- Occupations: Rapper; producer; songwriter
- Years active: 2002–present
- Labels: Rocstarr Entertainment; Black Cloud Music; The Chill Palace
- Website: http://www.CurtissKingBeats.com/

Dwan Howard, better known by his stage name Curtiss King, is an American hip hop recording artist and record producer based out of the Inland Empire in California. Signed to independent label Black Cloud Music, King is also known for his productions credits with artists such as Murs, Noa James, Ab-Soul, Glasses Malone, Mack 10 and more.

== Biography ==
=== Before 2003: Early life and career beginnings ===
Curtiss King grew up as a shy child, particularly while attending Curtiss Middle school, he found ways to combat his insecurities by listening to music and getting lost in 90s sitcoms; giving him his stage name Curtiss King. From the beginning, with the help of a high school friend, YouTube, and a library card, Curtiss King set out to teach himself how to produce, engineer and write his own records, edit his own videos, design his own album covers, script his own websites, and build his brand from the ground up.

=== 2003–2008: Notorious Scholars and The Storm on Mars ===
Shortly after graduating High School in 2003, Curtiss began creating and circulating numerous mixtapes to his Cerritos college classmates. After joining Myspace in 2005, he began to gain local popularity for his self pressed projects. In 2007 his production demand got a huge boost when he got a placement on the Vans Downtown Showdown Skate DVD as well as Top Dawg Entertainment (TDE) artist Ab-Soul's first project Longterm with the song "Watch Yo Lady" featuring K-Dot (Kendrick Lamar). Later that same year Curtiss King signed to Rocstarr Entertainment, an up-and-coming independent label run by producer Tae Beast and producer/engineer/songwriter Starr Lab based out of Inglewood. Under the imprint he released two well received street albums Notorious Scholars and The Storm On Mars which boasted features from Ab-Soul and Young Rook as well as production from Tae Beast. After a few years Curtiss and Rocstarr Entertainment parted ways, and once again he found himself having to grind it out alone.

While working a part-time job, King soon began to attend Orange Coast College in Costa Mesa where he eventually earned his Entry Level Marketing Certificate. Shortly after his collegiate accomplishments, he lost both of his grandparents to Cancer. Seeking a brand new start, Curtiss eventually moved to the Inland Empire with his mother. From spitting acapellas at local poetry venues to entering beat contests, he made it a point to engage himself in this vibrant music scene.

=== 2009– 2010: Black Cloud Music, Snick @ Nite and Jet Pack On E ===
In 2009, he saw his fanbase and production demand skyrocketed after collaborating with and producing for highly acclaimed artist Noa James on his Sounds of A Monster and Ab-Soul's Longterm 2. Shortly after these collaborations, King's work eventually caught the attention of engineer/producer/rapper Jynxx, who approached King about signing to his independent label, Black Cloud Music. Under the Black Cloud Music imprint Curtiss began to gain nationwide exposure as an artist with the release of projects such as Snick @ Nite, and Jet Pack On E.

In 2010, King's production began to take on a worldwide exposure when he was invited to compete in the Red Bull Big Tune Beat Battle. Curtiss would also see additional exposure when he scored his first major label placement on Glasses Malone and Mack 10's album Money Music.

=== 2011–present: Paid Dues Festival 2012, Atychiphobia ===
In July 2011, King released his highly anticipated EP DIY (Do It Yourself), hosted by Ashley Outrageous. Boasting indie favorites such as "Sinbad," "21Sev7n," and "PCC" with features from Dirty Birdy, Noa James, Faimkills, and Sean Faylon, DIY was the tipping point for Curtiss King's career.

In late 2011, King was given the rare opportunity to produce for a live action video game trailer for the popular computer game APB: Reloaded.

After putting together a 97-day campaign to get on the lineup for the 2012 Paid Dues Festival, King was officially invited by hip hop artist Murs to perform on the Dues Paid Stage at the festival, ending a successful campaign. Shortly after performing at Paid Dues in April 2012, King made more noise a month later after producing Ab-Soul's single, "A Rebellion", featuring Alori Joh, from his highly anticipated album Control System, which went on to be number one on the iTunes Hip Hop Charts.

On April 3, 2019, King released "Ratchets Still Jockin" as his first official single from his debut album AtyChiphobia – The Fear Of Failure, released during the summer of 2019.

In 2020, King produced the entirety of Murs and Dee-1's 11-track album, He's the Christian, I'm the Rapper, released on September 18, 2020.

== Personal life ==
Rapping since the age of 17 and producing since 18, King names artists such as Outkast, Sade, 2Pac, Kanye West, Cameo, Zapp and Roger, Earth Wind and Fire, Jill Scott, Erykah Badu, and 80s synths as some of his inspirations.

== Discography ==
- President Howard (2007)
- Notorious Scholars (2008)
- The Storm on Mars (2009)
- Snick @ Nite (2009)
- Jet Pack On E (2010)
- Big Drums Come Knockin (2010)
- SlumBeautiful (2010)
- D.I.Y. (EP) (2011)
- AtyChiphobia – The Fear Of Failure (2012)
- Shut Your Trap (with Murs) (2014)
- Raging Waters (2015)
