= Rock the Bells =

Annual hip-hop festival

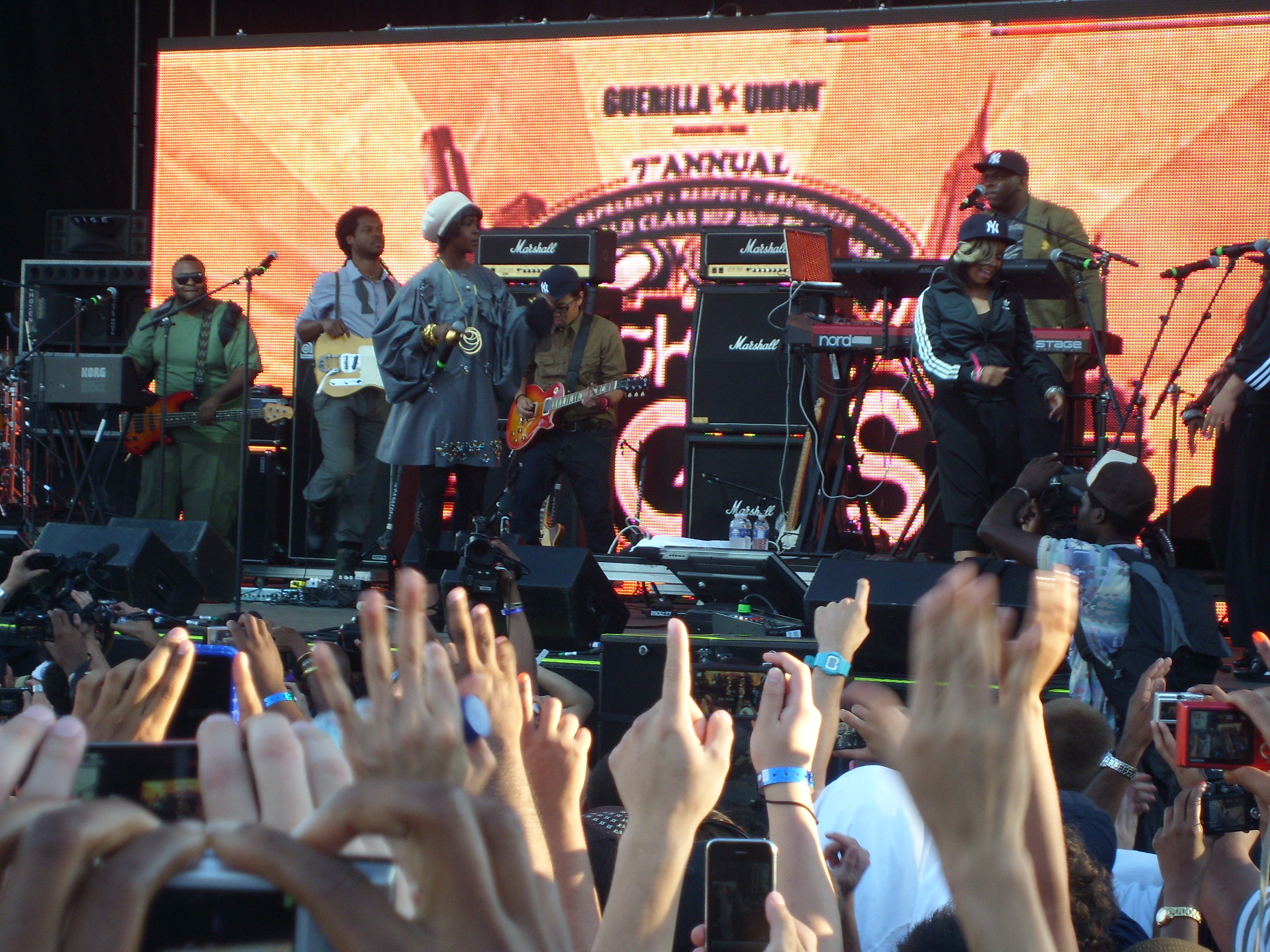
- Lauryn Hill at Rock the Bells (2010)
- Genre: Hip hop music
- Dates: Mid to Late Summer
- Location: United States
- Years active: 2004 – 2013; 2023
- Founders: Guerilla Union
- Website: Rock The Bells – Official Website

Rock the Bells is an annual hip-hop festival that originally took place in Southern California only, but has since toured throughout the world. The concert features a line-up of high-profile alternative hip-hop artists, often headlined by a more mainstream artist. The first festival was held in 2004, featuring a re-united Wu-Tang Clan, who performed four months before Ol' Dirty Bastard's death. That festival is covered in depth by a 2006 documentary film also called Rock the Bells.

== Performances ==
LL Cool J delivered a standout performance that was enhanced with the presence of The Roots as his backing band, and DJ Z-Trip on the turntables. His set included a special tribute to the late DMX with Meth, Red, and Black Thought rapping verses in the song '4,3,2,1'.

Queen Latifah also delivered a memorable performance, reminding attendees of her lasting impact on the hip-hop culture. She performed classics like "Latifah's Had It Up 2 Here", "Just Another Day", and the theme song to her hit sitcom, Living Single. Special appearances from Rapsody, Remy M, MC Lyte, Yo-Yo, and Monie Love were also part of her set.

Rakim, often termed as the God MC, graced the festival with his classic hits like "Don't Sweat The Technique" and "Paid In Full".

Other performances included legendary artists such as Slick Rick, Swizz Beatz, MC Lyte, The Cold Crush Brothers each contributing to the overall success of the festival.

== Technical difficulties ==
The festival faced a few technical difficulties with the sound system that impacted performances and led to the cancellation of De La Soul's set.

== Cultural impact ==
The Rock the Bells Festival 2023 was not only a musical celebration but also a cultural one, highlighting hip-hop's impact and its evolution over the past five decades. The festival proved to be a platform for fans to experience the essence of hip-hop through performances by some of the genre's most iconic figures.

== Festivals ==
Date	City	Country	Venue	Lineup
July 17, 2004	San Bernardino	United States	National Orange Show	Wu-Tang Clan, Redman, Dilated Peoples, Sage Francis, Supernatural, DJ Nu-Mark of Jurassic 5, Eyedea and Abilities, Fantastik 4our, DJ Mark Luv, DJ Icy Ice, DJ Abel.
November 13, 2004	Anaheim	United States	Anaheim Stadium Parking Lot	A Tribe Called Quest, Xzibit, Cypress Hill, Jurassic 5 – Special Guest, Little Brother, The CMA, Crown City Rockers, Self Scientific, DJ Revolution, DJ Mark Luv, DJ Icy Ice.
July 30, 2005	San Bernardino	United States	National Orange Show	Nas, KRS-One – Special Guest, Redman, Raekwon and Ghostface Killah (Cuban Linx), Living Legends, DJ Qbert, Guru from Gang Starr, Cut Chemist from Jurassic 5, DJ Muggs from Cypress Hill, Non Phixion, Supernatural, The Visionaries, Oh No, Med, Percee P
August 5, 2006	San Bernardino	United States	National Orange Show	Wu-Tang Clan, Lauryn Hill- Special Guest, Mos Def, Talib Kweli, Redman, De La Soul, Dilated Peoples, Living Legends, Aesop Rock w/Rob Sonic & DJ Big Whiz, Del the Funky Homosapien, Immortal Technique, B-Real from Cypress Hill, The Visionaries, Murs 3:16, Planet Asia, UGK, Dirty Heads w/ DJ Rocky Rock, Supernatural. Surprise performances by Black Sheep, DJ Kool and Sen Dog (alongside B-Real).
August 6, 2006	Concord	United States	Sleep Train Pavilion	Wu-Tang Clan, Mos Def, Talib Kweli, Redman, De La Soul, Living Legends, Immortal Technique, Murs 3:16, Zion I, Supernatural, Planet Asia, Dirty Heads w/ DJ Rocky Rock.
August 5, 2023	Queens		Forest Hills Stadium	LL Cool J, Queen Latifah, Rakim, Slick Rick, Swizz Beatz, MC Lyte, The Cold Crush Brothers, The Roots, DJ Z-Trip, Meth, Red, Black Thought, Rapsody, Remy M, Yo-Yo, Monie Love

== Club tour ==
The concept was taken from the original, highly successful annual West-Coast hip-hop festival and transformed into a full-fledged United States tour.

Date	City	Country	Venue
November 21, 2006	Washington, D.C.	United States	9:30 Club
November 22, 2006	Myrtle Beach	United States	House of Blues
November 24, 2006	Greensboro	United States	The N Club
November 25, 2006	Hartford	United States	Webster
November 26, 2006	Allentown	United States	Crocodile Rock Café
November 28, 2006	New York City	United States	BB Kings
November 30, 2006	Boston	United States	Avalon
December 1, 2006	Providence	United States	Lupo's Heartbreak Hotel
December 2, 2006	Buffalo	United States	Buffalo Ballroom
December 3, 2006	Burlington	United States	Higher Ground
December 6, 2006	Chicago	United States	House of Blues
December 8, 2006	Park City	United States	Harry O
December 9, 2006	Denver	United States	Ogden Theatre
December 12, 2006	Vancouver	Canada	Plush Nightclub
December 13, 2006	Seattle	United States	The Showbox
December 14, 2006	Portland	United States	Roseland Theatre
December 15, 2006	Sacramento	United States	Empire
December 16, 2006	San Francisco	United States	Mezzanine
December 20, 2006	Los Angeles	United States	House of Blues
December 21, 2006	San Diego	United States	House of Blues
December 22, 2006	Anaheim	United States	House of Blues

Lineup
Redman, Raekwon, Keith Murray, Supernatural, EPMD, Ghostface Killah, Pharoahe Monch, Smif-n-Wessun, Dirty Heads, DJ Kool.

== 2007 Festival Series ==
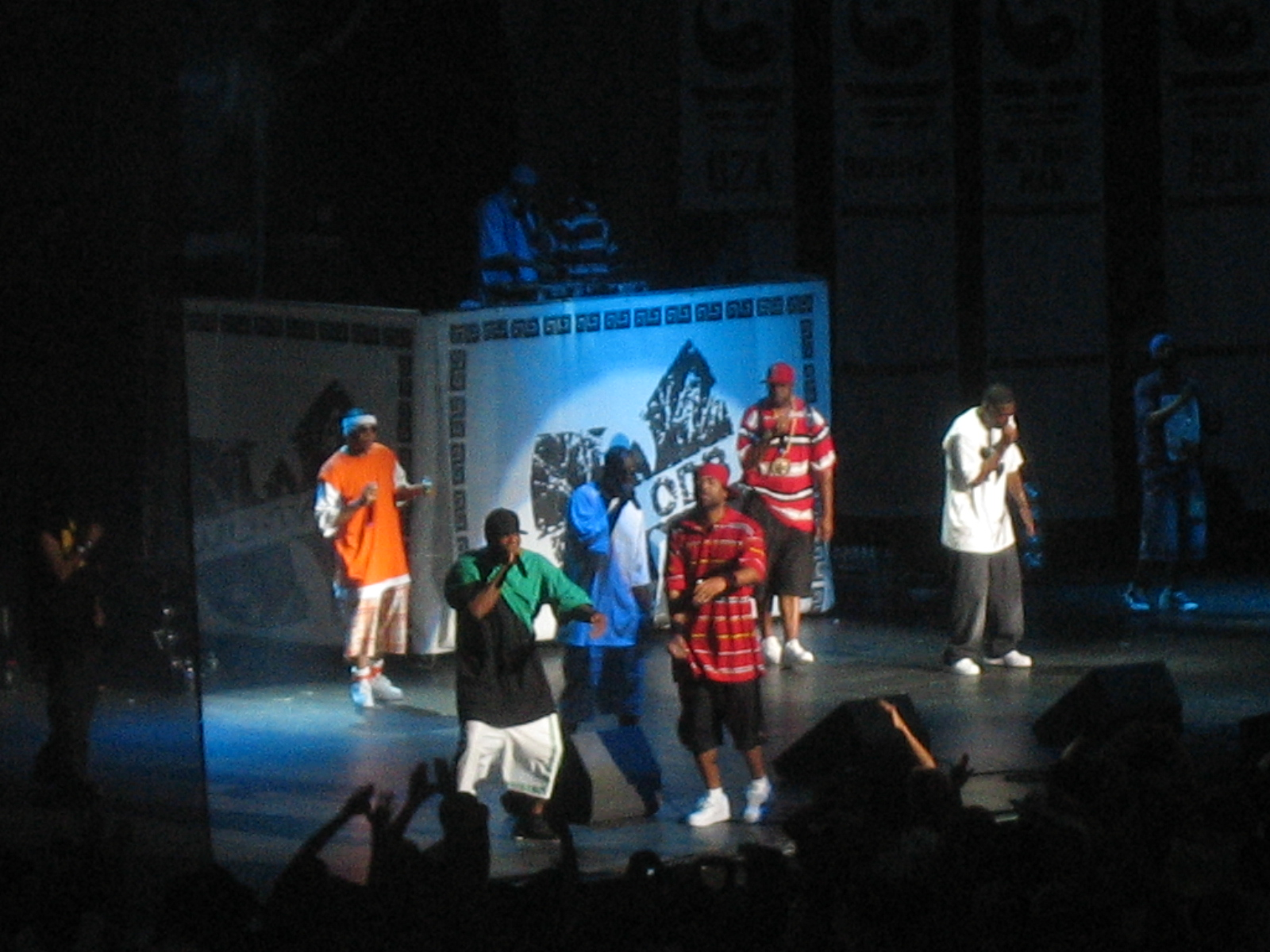
Wu-Tang Clan performing at the Tweeter Center in Mansfield, Massachusetts on the opening night of the 2007 tour.

Rock the Bells 2007 had 3 major venues scheduled; July 28 and July 29 in New York, August 11 in San Bernardino, and August 18 in San Francisco. These select shows were headlined by a reunited Rage Against the Machine, and co-headlined by Wu-Tang Clan. The artists appearing in the shows appeared in rotating slots over the two-show weekend in New York, and selected performances for the remaining duration of the 20 shows, which were head-lined by the Wu-Tang Clan. Five cities also had a second stage called the Paid Dues Independent Hip Hop Stage. Rage Against the Machine was the festival's first non-hip hop act to be featured.

Date	City	Country	Venue
July 26, 2007	Mansfield	United States	Tweeter Center
July 28, 2007	New York City	United States	Randall's Island*^
July 29, 2007	New York City	United States	Randall's Island*^
August 2, 2007	Atlanta	United States	Hi-Fi Buys Amphitheatre
August 3, 2007	Charlotte	United States	Verizon Wireless Amphitheatre
August 4, 2007	Miami	United States	Bayfront Park
August 7, 2007	Dallas	United States	Smirnoff Music Center
August 8, 2007	Houston	United States	Reliant Park
August 11, 2007	San Bernardino	United States	Hyundai Pavilion at Glen Helen*^
August 12, 2007	San Diego	United States	Coors Amphitheatre (parking lot)^
August 18, 2007	San Francisco	United States	McCovey Cove (parking lot)*^
August 21, 2007	Salt Lake City	United States	USANA Amphitheater
August 22, 2007	Denver	United States	Red Rocks Amphitheatre
August 25, 2007	Minneapolis	United States	The Myth
August 26, 2007	Chicago	United States	Charter One Pavilion
August 29, 2007	Clarkston	United States	DTE Energy
September 1, 2007	Honolulu	United States	Blaisdell Arena

Lineup
Main Stage: Rage Against the Machine*, Wu-Tang Clan, Cypress Hill, The Roots, Public Enemy, Erykah Badu, Rakim, Mos Def, Talib Kweli, Nas, Black Star* (Mos Def and Talib Kweli), EPMD, Pharoahe Monch, Immortal Technique, Jedi Mind Tricks, David Banner, UGK, Supernatural, Rahzel, Murs 3:16.
Paid Dues Independent Hip Hop Stage^: MF Doom, Living Legends, Felt, Sage Francis, Murs 3:16, Brother Ali, Cage, Mr. Lif, Living Legends, The Grouch & Eligh, Hangar 18, Blueprint, Lucky I Am, The Coup, Blackalicious, Ice Water Inc., Sen Dog from Cypress Hill, Hieroglyphics.

=== New York City dates ===
In July 2007, the Rock the Bells festival came to New York City, and this event became particularly noteworthy. Upon selling out the massive Randall's Island venue very quickly, the one-day stop in NYC was expanded to two days, and a number of new and exclusive guests were added to the bills. The festival included the full Paid Dues festival lineup performing on a second stage, reunited headliners Rage Against the Machine and Wu-Tang Clan, guest appearances during the show (including Scott Ian performing Bring the Noise with Public Enemy), a special performance of Black Star from Mos Def and Talib Kweli and one of the near-final performances of noted hip-hop luminary Pimp C.

New York City
July 28, 2007		July 29, 2007	
Guerilla Union Main Stage	Paid Dues Independent Stage	Guerilla Union Main Stage	Paid Dues Independent Stage
Rage Against the Machine; Wu-Tang Clan; Public Enemy; Cypress Hill; The Roots; Black Star; EPMD; Pharoahe Monch; Doom; Immortal Technique; Jedi Mind Tricks Hosted by Rahzel, Supernatural and Hi-Tek and featuring Mike Relm, Icy Ice, C-Minus, DJ Rocky Rock and DJ Mark Luv	Felt; Living Legends; Brother Ali; Sage Francis; Cage; Mr. Lif; Grouch & Eligh; Hangar 18; Blueprint; Lucky I Am	Rage Against the Machine; Wu-Tang Clan; Public Enemy; Cypress Hill; Erykah Badu (did not perform); Rakim; Mos Def; Talib Kweli; Pharoahe Monch; Immortal Technique; Boot Camp Clik; UGK; Jedi Mind Tricks Hosted by Rahzel, Supernatural and Hi-Tek and featuring Mike Relm, C-Minus and DJ Rocky Rock	Felt; Living Legends; Brother Ali; Sage Francis; Cage; Doom; Mr. Lif; Grouch & Eligh; Hangar 18; Blueprint; Lucky I Am

== 2008 Festival Series ==
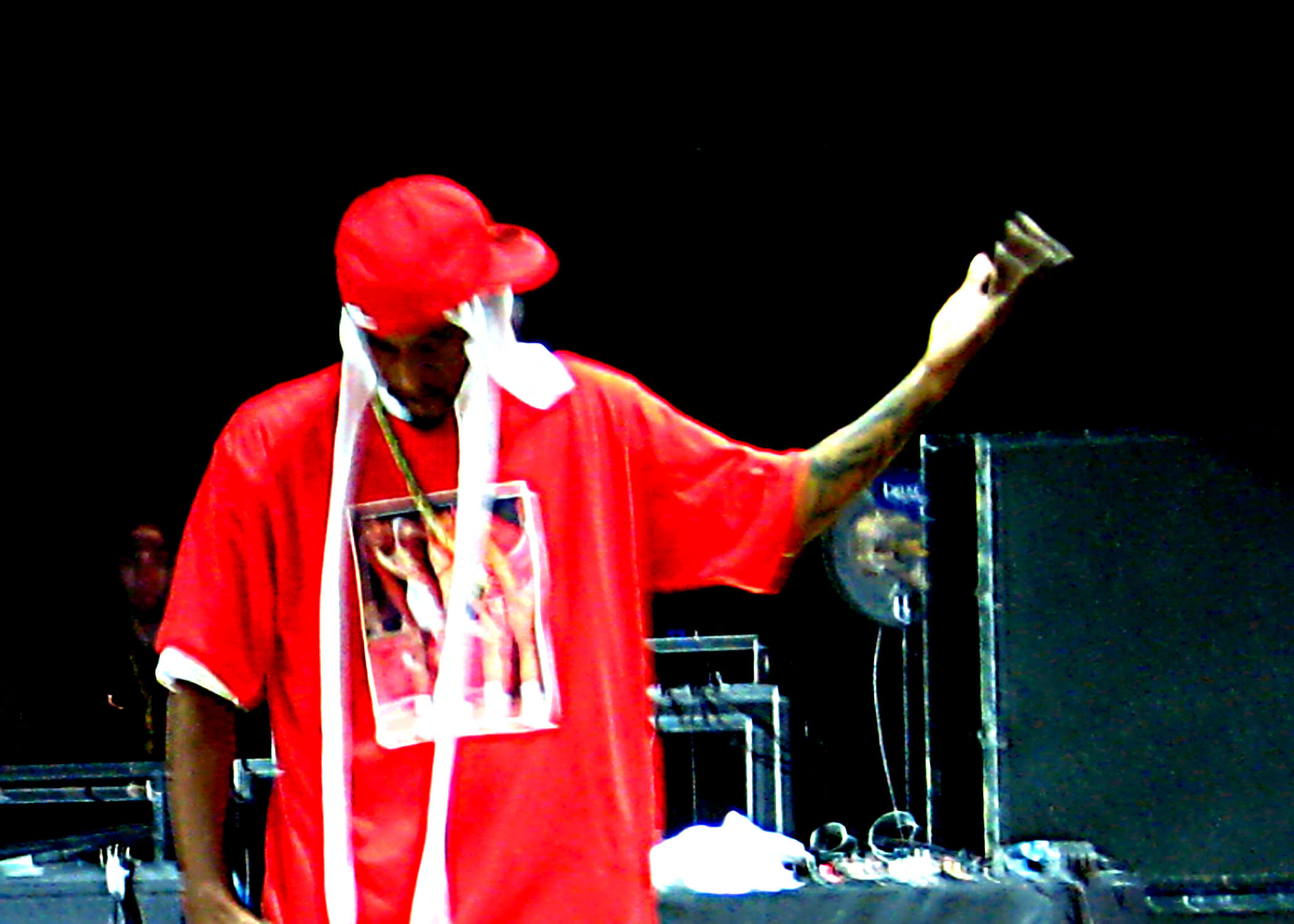
Rakim performing at Merriweather Post Pavilion in Maryland on July 27.

2008 also marks the first year that Rock the Bells went global with four stops in Europe and one in Japan. Highlights of the series include a first time date in Toronto, plus a return to the Glen Helen Pavilion in San Bernardino where last year's show sold out with a capacity crowd of 45,000 people.

Date	City	Country	Venue
July 19, 2008	Tinley Park	United States	First Midwest Bank Amphitheatre
July 20, 2008	Toronto	Canada	Canada Arrow Hall
July 26, 2008	Mansfield	United States	Comcast Center*
July 27, 2008	Columbia	United States	Merriweather Post Pavilion*
August 2, 2008	Miami	United States	Bayfront Park
August 3, 2008	Wantagh	United States	Jones Beach Theater*
August 9, 2008	San Bernardino	United States	Glen Helen Pavilion*
August 16, 2008	Mountain View	United States	Shoreline Amphitheatre
August 23, 2008	Greenwood Village	United States	Fiddler's Green Amphitheatre*
September 6, 2008	George	United States	The Gorge Amphitheatre*

Lineup
Main Stage:A Tribe Called Quest, The Pharcyde- Special Guests, Nas, Ghostface and Raekwon, MF Doom, Rakim, Mos Def, Talib Kweli, De La Soul, Method Man & Redman, Immortal Technique, Dead Prez, Murs, Blue Scholars, Sage Francis, Little Brother, Jedi Mind Tricks.
Bigbox Culture Club Stage*:Spank Rock/Amanda Blank, The Cool Kids, Kidz in the Hall, DJ Afrika Bambaataa, Flosstradamus, Wale, Santogold, Kid Sister, B.o.B, Tyga, Jay Electronica, Devlin & Darko, Ninjasonik, Blaqstarr, Tyler Pase, Plastic Little, The Pack.

== 2008 International Festival Series ==
Date	City	Country	Venue
October 31, 2008	Prague	Czech Republic	T-Mobile Arena
November 1, 2008	Amsterdam	Netherlands	Heineken Music Hall
November 4, 2008	Stockholm	Sweden	Annexet
November 5, 2008	Helsinki	Finland	Helsinki Ice Hall
November 9, 2008	London	England	Indigo2 @ The O2 Arena
November 10, 2008	Paris	France	Zenith

Lineup
Nas, Mos Def, De La Soul, The Pharcyde, Supernatural & Scratch, Epmd.

== 2009 International Festival Series ==
Date	City	Country	Venue
June 27, 2009	Tinley Park	United States	First Midwest Bank Amphitheatre
June 28, 2009	Clarkston	United States	DTE Energy Music Theater
July 5, 2009	Toronto	Canada	Molson Amphitheatre
July 12, 2009	Columbia	United States	Merriweather Post Pavilion
July 18, 2009	Mansfield	United States	Comcast Center
July 19, 2009	Wantagh	United States	Jones Beach Theater
August 1, 2009	Burnaby	Canada	Deer Lake Park
August 2, 2009	Calgary	Canada	Shaw Millennium Park
August 6, 2009	Morrison	United States	Red Rocks Amphitheatre
August 8, 2009	San Bernardino	United States	San Manuel Amphitheatre
August 9, 2009	Mountain View	United States	Shoreline Amphitheatre

Rock the Bells '09
Main Stage	Paid Dues Independent Hip Hop Stage	Surprise Acts
Nas & Damian Marley; Wu-Tang Clan (New York City only); Cypress Hill (Calgary only); Mos Def (Toronto only); Ice Cube (San Bernardino only); The Roots; Common; Busta Rhymes; Big Boi; EPMD; House of Pain featuring La Coka Nostra; Reflection Eternal; Tech N9ne; Dragon Fli Empire; K'naan; Raekwon; Chali 2na The Knux	Rza; Gza; Slaughterhouse; Slum Village; Evidence & The Alchemist; M.O.P. Psycho Realm; Buckshot; Necro; Sage Francis; Eyedea & Abilities; Tabi Bonney; Mystik Journeymen; Mickey Factz; B. Dolan; Short Dawg; Hosted by KRS-One, Supernatural, Murs and Pete Rock	Washington, D.C. Skillz; AZ; Styles P Pharoahe Monch; Boston; Krizz Kaliko; Kutt Calhoun; New York City; Jadakiss; Ice-T; The Lox; DJ Premier; Styles P Method Man; U-God; Gravediggaz

== 2010 Festival Series ==
On the evening of May 24, 2010 Guerilla Union held the Rock the Bells Launch Party at Key Club in Hollywood, CA. The launch party featured surprise guest performances, and the official announcement of the 2010 season lineup. New to the festival this year is a "Classics" theme; the headlining acts will be performing the following classic hip-hop albums in their entirety: A Tribe Called Quest performing Midnight Marauders, Snoop Dogg (with Warren G, Tha Dogg Pound, The Lady of Rage and RBX) performing Doggystyle, Wu-Tang Clan (entire group, with Boy Jones – first son of Ol' Dirty Bastard) performing Enter the Wu-Tang (36 Chambers), Rakim performing Paid in Full, KRS-One performing Criminal Minded, Slick Rick performing The Great Adventures of Slick Rick, and DJ Premier and Lauryn Hill as special guests. Unannounced guest appearances included The Madd Rapper, Large Professor, Busta Rhymes, Skyzoo, Swizz Beatz, and Nas.

Date	City	Country	Venue
August 21, 2010	San Bernardino	United States	NOS Events Center
August 22, 2010	Mountain View	United States	Shoreline Amphitheatre
August 28, 2010	New York City	United States	Governor's Island
August 29, 2010	Columbia	United States	Merriweather Post Pavilion

Rock the Bells
Main Stage	Second Stage
Snoop Dogg with Warren G, Tha Dogg Pound, The Lady of Rage and RBX; A Tribe Called Quest; Wu-Tang Clan (with Boy Jones, ODB's first-born son); Lauryn Hill; Rakim; KRS-One (with Black Moon); Slick Rick; DJ Premier	Street Sweeper Social Club; Murs & 9th Wonder; Wiz Khalifa; Clipse; Immortal Technique; Brother Ali; Jedi Mind Tricks; Supernatural; DJ Muggs with Ill Bill; DJ Rocky Rock; Big Sean; Yelawolf; Hosted by Peter Rosenberg, D. Schwartz and K-Salaam

== 2011 Festival Series ==
On the evening of May 24, 2011 Guerilla Union once again held the Rock the Bells Launch Party. Rapper Supernatural revealed the lineup for this year's edition of the festival. Keeping in the spirit of the 2010 artists, the more prolific acts on this year's festival will be performing a selection of "classic" albums in their entirety. These include Lauryn Hill's The Miseducation of Lauryn Hill, Nas' Illmatic, Erykah Badu's Baduizm, Cypress Hill's Black Sunday, Mos Def & Talib Kweli's Black Star, Raekwon's Only Built 4 Cuban Linx..., Mobb Deep's The Infamous, Gza's Liquid Swords, Souls of Mischief's 93 'til Infinity, Black Moon's Enta da Stage and Masta Killa's No Said Date. Additionally, Currensy and Mac Miller will be appearing exclusively on the west coast dates while Evidence will appear only on the East Coast. More recently, rapper Common has been added to three shows, performing his album Be.

Date	City	Country	Venue
August 20, 2011	San Bernardino	United States	San Manuel Amphitheater
August 27, 2011	Mountain View	United States	Shoreline Amphitheatre
September 3, 2011	New York City	United States	Governor's Island
September 24, 2011 (CANCELLED)	Mansfield	United States	Comcast Center

Rock the Bells '11
Rock the Bells Stage	36 Chambers Stage	Paid Dues Stage
Nas with AZ, Pete Rock and DJ Premier; Ms. Lauryn Hill; Erykah Badu*; Cypress Hill; Black Star; Common*; Random Axe*; Hosted by Peter Rosenberg	Raekwon + Ghostface Killah; Mobb Deep; Genius/Gza; Black Moon; Mac Miller*; Currensy*; Childish Gambino; Masta Killa; Killah Priest; Hosted by the Rza, Supernatural and Boy Jones	Immortal Technique; Doom; Slaughterhouse; Big K.R.I.T. Souls of Mischief; Evidence*; Blu + Exile + Fashawn; Macklemore & Ryan Lewis*; Freddie Gibbs; Roc Marciano; Hosted by Murs

- *Denotes that the artist will be appearing only in select cities

== 2012 Festival Series ==
From early May to June, Guerilla Union unveiled the full lineup for the latest Rock the Bells festival series. It was also revealed that this year's festival will consist of three, two-day weekend events, with two shows on the west coast and one in the east.

Rock the Bells '12
San Bernardino	Mountain View	Holmdel
Nas; Bone Thugs-n-Harmony; Kid Cudi; Wiz Khalifa; J. Cole; Atmosphere; Common; Ice Cube; Method Man & Redman; DMX + Eve; Jadakiss; Wu Block (featuring Raekwon + Ghostface Killah + Jadakiss + Sheek Louch + Styles P); Dipset; Kendrick Lamar; Currensy; Sean Price; Deltron 3030; Hit Squad; 2 Chainz; Tyga; Pusha T Immortal Technique; E-40 & Too Short; DJ Quik; Naughty by Nature; Salt-N-Pepa; Big Daddy Kane; Lance Robertson & Friends; Yelawolf; Murs + Fashawn; Prodigy; Zion I + Grouch + Eligh; Schoolboy Q Ab-Soul; Future; Dom Kennedy; YG; Watsky; Jay Rock*; Hosted by Rza & MC Supernatural	Nas; Bone Thugs-n-Harmony; Kid Cudi; J. Cole; DMX + Eve; Mac Miller; Atmosphere; Common; Ice Cube; Method Man & Redman; Wu Block (featuring Raekwon + Ghostface Killah + Jadakiss + Sheek Louch + Styles P); ASAP Rocky; Dipset; Kendrick Lamar; Deltron 3030; Hit Squad; 2 Chainz; Tyga; Pusha T Immortal Technique; DJ Quik; Mix Master Mike; Naughty by Nature; Salt-N-Pepa; Big Daddy Kane; Lance Robertson & Friends; Yelawolf; Murs + Fashawn; Slick Rick; Zion I + Grouch + Eligh; Schoolboy Q Ab-Soul; Dom Kennedy; Action Bronson; Watsky; Jay Rock; Hosted by Rza & MC Supernatural	Nas; Bone Thugs-n-Harmony; J. Cole; Big Sean; Common; Ice Cube; Method Man & Redman; DMX + Eve + Jadakiss; Wu Block (featuring Raekwon + Ghostface Killah + Jadakiss + Sheek Louch + Styles P); Dipset; Currensy; Sean Price; Deltron 3030; Hit Squad; 2 Chainz; Tyga; Pusha T Immortal Technique; DJ Quik; Mix Master Mike; Naughty by Nature; Salt-N-Pepa; Big Daddy Kane; Lance Robertson & Friends; Yelawolf; Murs + Fashawn; Prodigy; M.O.P. Slick Rick; Zion I + Grouch + Eligh; Schoolboy Q Ab-Soul; Future; Dom Kennedy; Action Bronson; Watsky; Jay Rock; Hosted by Rza & MC Supernatural

== 2013 Festival Series ==
On May 14, Guerilla Union held a launch party in Los Angeles. At that event they announced performances by Black Hippy, Big K.R.I.T., Brother Ali, Chase & Status, Common, Bone Thugs-n-Harmony (including a virtual performance by the late Eazy-E), Currensy, Danny Brown, Dilated Peoples, Dizzy Wright, Dom Kennedy, E-40, Earl Sweatshirt, Hit-Boy, Hopsin, Immortal Technique, Jhené Aiko, Joey Badass and the Pro Era, Juicy J, Jurassic 5, Kid Cudi, Lecrae, Logic, Mimosa, Rakim, Riff Raff, Snow Tha Product, Talib Kweli, Tech N9ne, Too Short, Tyler, The Creator and Wu-Tang Clan (including a virtual performance by the late Ol' Dirty Bastard). Other performers added by the start of the festival included ASAP Mob, Girl Talk, J Cole, Jurassic 5, KRS-One, Deltron 3030, Slick Rick, Doug E. Fresh, Chief Keef, and a New York only headline performance by Pretty Lights. The 2013 series was hosted by Murs and Hot 97's Peter Rosenberg. To mark the 10th anniversary of Rock the Bells, Wu Tang Clan was meant to reunite, but Raekwon and Ghostface Killah did not make appearances. Originally the series was scheduled for eight dates, two nights each in San Francisco, Los Angeles, Washington D.C., and New York City. However, due to poor sales, the east coast shows were canceled.

== See also ==
- List of hip hop music festivals
- List of electronic music festivals
