= Frisco Five =

The Frisco Five, also known as #Frisco5, are a group of protesters who went on hunger strike on April 21, 2016 in San Francisco, California in front of the San Francisco Police Department Mission Station to demonstrate against episodes of police brutality, use-of-force violations, and racial bias. Specifically the deaths of Alex Nieto on March 21, 2014, Mario Woods on December 2, 2015, Amilcar Perez Lopez on February 26, 2015, and Luis Gongora on April 7, 2016.

== Background ==
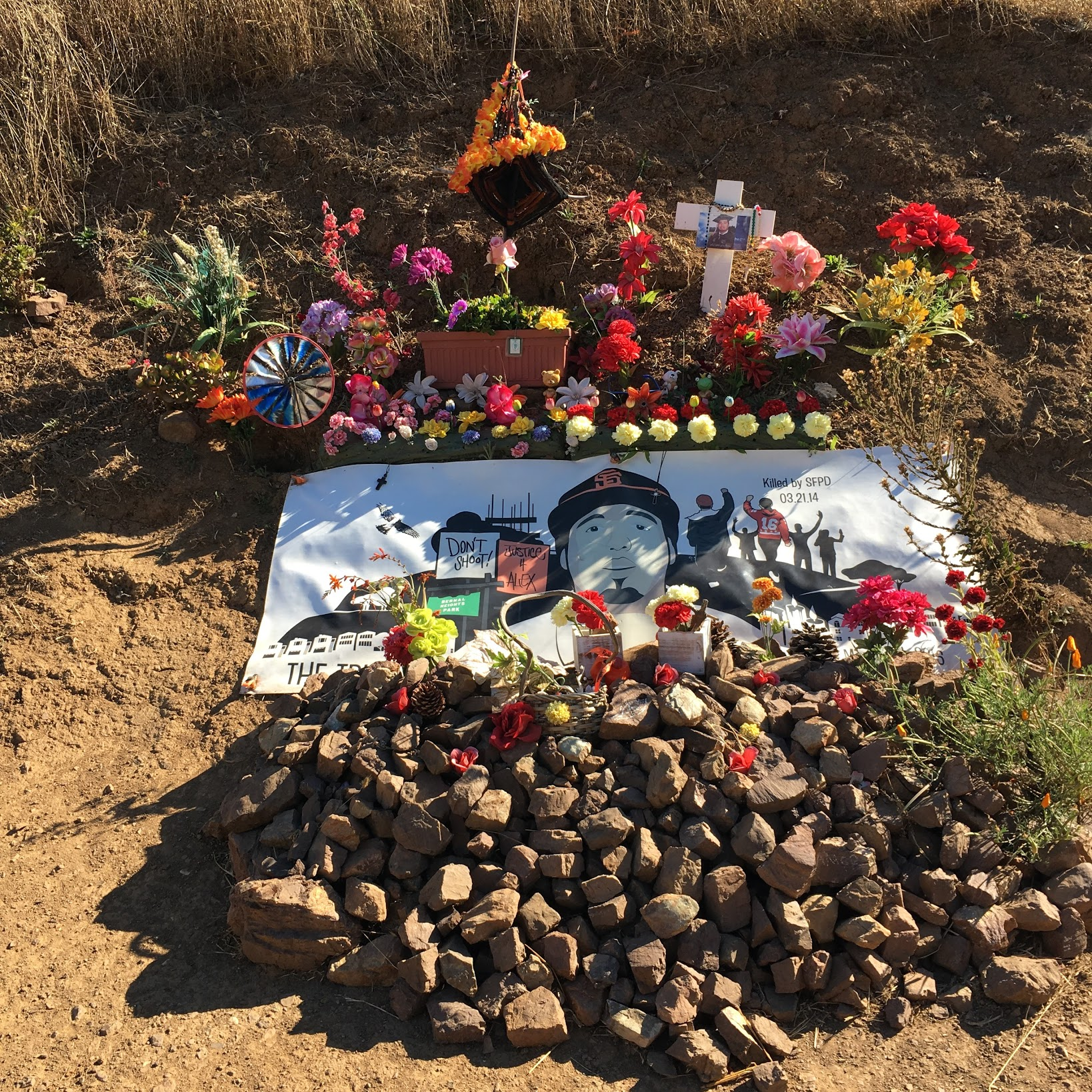
Alex Nieto memorial (2016), Bernal Heights Hill, San Francisco

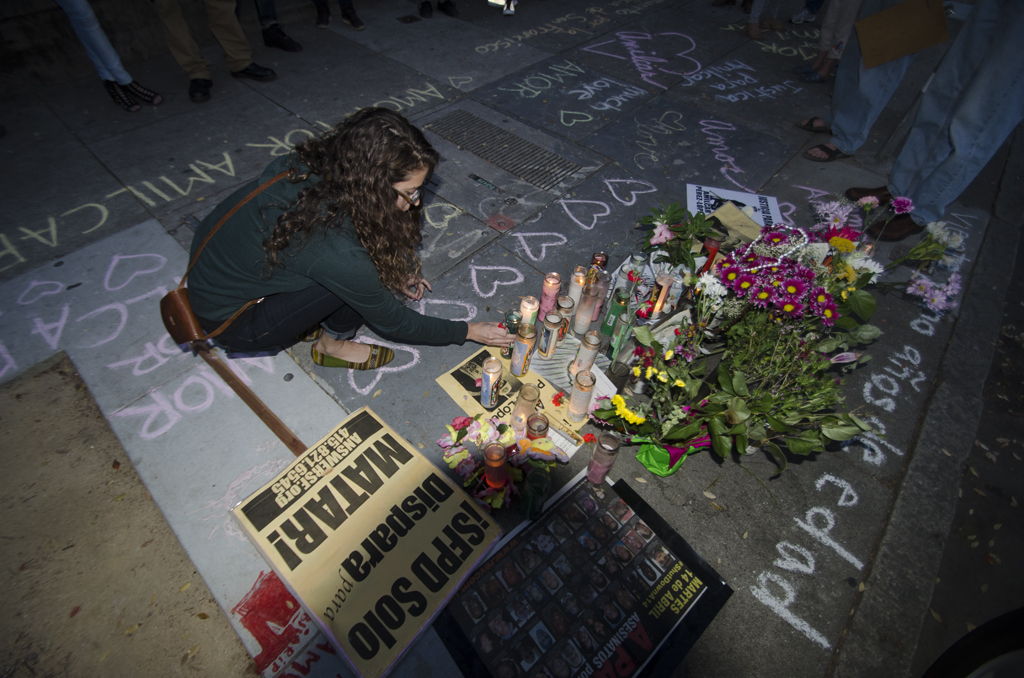
Amilcar Perez-Lopez memorial (2015), Mission District, San Francisco

The five protesters – Ike Pinkston, 42, Sellassie Blackwell, 39, Edwin Lindo, 29, Maria Gutierrez, 66, and her son Ilyich "Equipto" Sato, 42 – called for the resignation of SFPD chief Greg Suhr over a series of recent shootings of men of color. The protesters were a mix of musicians, educators, and a politician: Pinkston, Sellassie, and Equipto are hip hop artists, Gutierrez is director of Los Compañeros del Barrio Preschool, and Lindo was a candidate for Supervisor in District 9.

In February 2016, the San Francisco Police Department had voluntarily requested a United States Department of Justice begin a Community Oriented Policing Services (COPS) review in an effort to reform the department, but it was not a civil rights review like that being undertaken in Ferguson, Missouri. Mayor Lee and the San Francisco Police Commission proposed changes in use of force policies on February 22, 2016. The San Francisco Police Officers Association, SFPD's union, refused to comply with the proposed policy and issued its own proposed use of force policy on April 6, 2016. The San Francisco Public Defender Jeff Adachi sent California Attorney General Kamala Harris a request that supported the protestor's claims of racism by the San Francisco Police Department, and requested a civil rights investigation that would be enforceable. After Gongora's death, Adachi was joined by District Attorney George Gascon, Mission District Supervisor David Campos, and other stakeholders to protest the lack of transparency and need for police reform.

In April 2016, the protest was further fueled by additional revelations of racist and homophobic text messages exchanged among SFPD officers, one year after the first discovery of racist texts resulted in the firing of eight officers as part of a federal corruption probe.

Suhr said he would not resign over the racist text scandal and received support from Mayor Ed Lee. Mayor Lee spoke with the Frisco Five, telling them he respected their right to protest but that he would not agree to their demand that he fire Suhr. As the five protesters were hospitalized on the 16th day of the hunger strike, the Frisco Five supporters were joined by an additional group of supporters at San Francisco City Hall, resulting in clashes with the police and 33 people arrested.

On May 7, 2016, the Frisco Five called off their hunger strike and called for a general strike in San Francisco on May 9, 2016. At a press conference on the morning of May 12, 2016, the Frisco Five outlined their specific demands on Suhr's ouster and other reforms.

== See also ==
- Black Lives Matter
- 2013 California prisoner hunger strike
