= Equipto =

American rapper and activist

Equipto is the stage name of Ilyich Yasuchi Sato, a rapper and political activist based in the San Francisco Bay Area. In his teens, Equipto founded Bored Stiff, a long-running hip-hop group, and has performed and toured with many notable hip-hop acts, including KRS-One, De La Soul, Mac Dre, and Nas. He has also released music with Andre Nickatina.

Equipto led the Frisco Five hunger strike outside San Francisco's Mission District police station, to protest police brutality and killings of unarmed civilians. The hunger strike has been discussed as direct action similar to that of Martin Luther King Jr. by three law professors, while another scholar argued that the hunger-striking rappers exhibited the same type of political power as Malcolm X when he attempted to thwart the military draft.

Equipto is of mixed Japanese and Colombian ancestry. He is named after Vladimir Ilyich Lenin, the first leader of the Soviet Union. His father, Art Sato, was born in a Japanese internment camp in Colorado.

== Discography ==
Albums:

- 1992: 3 Shades Of Rhythm EP (with 3 Shades Of Rhythm)
- 1993: Xcuse The Static (with The People’s)
- 1994: Peacock Lounge Promo Tape (with Bored Stiff)
- 1994: 8 Track Music (with Bored Stiff)
- 1995: Explainin' (with Bored Stiff)
- 1997: Timeless (with Bored Stiff)
- 1999: Vintage Volume Won (Avant Garde)
- 2000: Vintage Volume II (Like There's No Tomorrow)
- 2001: Ghetto Research (with Bored Stiff)
- 2001: Explainin' (Collectors Edition) (with Bored Stiff)
- 2002: Unreleased 4 Track Shit (with Bored Stiff)
- 2002: Midnight Machine Gun, Rhymes, And Alibis (with Andre Nickatina)
- 2002: Vintage Volume III (It Hurts So Good)
- 2003: Hybrid (with Estairy)
- 2003: For The Record (with TD Camp)
- 2004: K.I.M. EP (with Michael Marshall)
- 2004: Cigariilos EP
- 2004: K.I.M. (with Michael Marshall)
- 2004: Cigariilos
- 2004: Sketches (From The Inside Out)
- 2005: Horns & Halos EP (with Andre Nickatina)
- 2005: The Takeover (This Love Cover) (with Michael Marshall)
- 2005: Horns & Halos (with Andre Nickatina)
- 2005: Gun Mouth 4 Hire: Horns & Halos #2 (with Andre Nickatina)
- 2006: Bullet Symphony: Horns & Halos #3 (with Andre Nickatina)
- 2006: Behind The Rhyme
- 2006: 3 New Songs EP (with Bored Stiff)
- 2006: Tha Western Union (That's My Folk)
- 2007: Track Money & Pack Money (with Berner)
- 2007: 4 Ever In A Day EP
- 2007: 4 Ever In A Nite EP
- 2007: From The Ground Up (with Bored Stiff)
- 2007: Sin City (with K-Dinero)
- 2007: 4 Ever In A Day LP
- 2008: International EP (with Bored Stiff)
- 2008: On My Down Time
- 2008: Explainin'/Timeless (with Bored Stiff)
- 2008: The Sad Truth (with Bored Stiff)
- 2009: Duffle Bag Money (with Berner)
- 2009: Now More Than Ever EP (with Bored Stiff)
- 2009: A Christmas Album (with Solidarity Records)
- 2009: Selections From The Vintage Collection
- 2010: Profound (with Solidarity Records)
- 2010: The Generation Gap (with Dregs One)
- 2010: Mans World Mixtape (with Solidarity Records)
- 2011: K.I.M. 2 (Keep It Movin' 2 Love Changes) (with Michael Marshall)
- 2011: Red X Tapes (with Opio)
- 2011: llyich
- 2012: Hellaween (with Hippy Mobb)
- 2012: Million Dollar Remix Series (Volume 3): Resinated Raps
- 2012: No Filter (with DJ Troubleman)
- 2013: The Stress Free Tour Compilation (with Solidarity Records)
- 2014: Out Of Respect
- 2014: Red XX (with Opio)
- 2015: 3 Shades Of Rhythm LP (with 3 Shades Of Rhythm)
- 2015: Baby Steps (with Otayo Dubb)
- 2015: Smoke Filled Room (with Hippy Mobb)
- 2015: Phoenix Academy (with White Mic & Professor X)
- 2016: 1530 EP (with I.L.A.M.)
- 2017: The UpKeep Mixtape
- 2017: K.I.M. 2.5 (Forever Unfinished) (with Michael Marshall)
- 2018: The Watershed (with Brycon)
- 2019: Our 2 Cents (with Architect)
- 2019: Few And Far Between
- 2019: K.I.M. 3 (Sigue La Movida) (with Michael Marshall)
- 2020: Out Range (with Big Shawn)
- 2021: When Worst Comes To Shove EP (with Bored Stiff)
- 2021: Civil Disobedience (Volume 1) (with Aagee)
- 2021: The Resurrection Of Game (with Cartel 360)
- 2021: Memoirs Of An Era Mixtape (with J-Duce)
- 2021: Don't Forget You're Welcome (with The Watershed)
- 2021: Out Range (Instrumentals) (with Big Shawn)
- 2022: The Peoples (with Bored Stiff)
- 2022: Can't Stay Perched All The Time (with Brycon)
- 2022: Coterie Coyote (with J-Duce & FDOG)
- 2022: Contrary To Popular Belief (with Architect)
- 2022: Can't Stay Perched All The Time (Instrumentals) (with Brycon)
- 2023: Equinox EP
- 2023: Attica EP (with AaGee)
- 2024: Someones Everything (with Gennessee)
- 2024: Vintage Volume Won (25th Anniversary Edition)
- 2024: We Still Here EP (with Riesgo)
- 2024: In Other Words (with DJ Pause)
- 2025: The Balancing Act (with Bored Stiff)
- 2026: Vintage Volume IV (The Weight Of Things) (with AyeWeezy)

Singles:

- 1998: Rappers (with Bored Stiff)
- 2007: Media (with Bored Stiff)
- 2007: Livin' Right (with Bored Stiff)
- 2011: Heart & Soul (S.F. Anthem) (featuring Michael Marshall)
- 2011: Back In The Box (featuring PW Esquire)
- 2011: 4 Wut It Iz
- 2012: Return Of The Backpacker (featuring Moka Only) (with Bored Stiff)
- 2012: Callin’ It Quits
- 2012: The Rise (with Nio Tha Gift & JusTme)
- 2012: Champagne Room (featuring Berner & J Stalin)
- 2013: I Wanna Be Happy (featuring Michael Marshall) (with Bored Stiff)
- 2013: Medicine Man (featuring T.hc) (with W.I.L.L.)
- 2013: Baby Steps (featuring Mars Today) (with Otayo Dubb)
- 2014: Yes, Yes, Yes (with Hippy Mobb)
- 2014: Fail To Win (with DJ Troubleman)
- 2014: This Is San Francisco (with Ashkon)
- 2014: Memoirs Of 2014
- 2015: Conspiracy Theory (with Bored Stiff)
- 2015: We've Been Waiting (G.S. Warriors Anthem) (with Michael Marshall)
- 2017: Real Dope (with The Watershed)
- 2017: The Sco (with Brycon)
- 2017: Tonight We Ride (with Michael Marshall)
- 2018: Freeman's Funk (with Junokoala)
- 2018: Swamp (with The Watershed)
- 2019: The One That Got Away (with Michael Marshall)
- 2019: Been Here Before (with The Watershed)
- 2020: Stars (with Brycon & Cyph4)
- 2021: Days Go By (featuring Ka'Ra Kersey & Momma Woods)
- 2021: Spliff (Part 2) (with Brycon)
- 2021: Wilderness (featuring Phesto Dee) (with Brycon)
- 2022: True Story
- 2022: Free Palestine (with Sharif Rithmatik)
- 2022: Cosmos (with AG)
- 2022: Dia De Los Muertos
- 2023: Butterflies (featuring Byron Mayhew) (with Mcstravick)
- 2023: Nothin' But Love (Remix) (with Azmito, Nicofasho, & Michael Marshall)
- 2024: Going Crazy (with Bored Stiff)
- 2025: Tears For Freaky
- 2025: Ho Chi Minh (featuring Guilty Simpson)
- 2025: The Promise Of Len Bias (with Brycon)
- 2026: M.P.L.S. (featuring Power Struggle)
- 2026: As I Look Back (featuring Rome)
- 2026: As I Look Back (Signature Remix) (featuring Rome)
