= Andre Nickatina =

American rapper (born 1970)

- Also known as: Dre Dog
- Born: Andre Lamond Adams; March 11, 1970 (age 56); San Francisco, California, U.S.
- Genres: Hip hop; West Coast hip hop; hyphy
- Occupations: Rapper; record producer
- Years active: 1992–present
- Labels: In-A-Minute; Dogday; Fillmoe Coleman; Million Dollar Dream; I-Khan; 75 Girls
- Website: https://www.andrenickatina.com/

Andre Lamond Adams (born March 11, 1970), known artistically as Andre Nickatina, is an American rapper and record producer from San Francisco, California. Nickatina is known for his distinctive voice, original flow, and lyrical exploration. He previously performed under the stage name Dre Dog.

== Personal life ==
Andre Adams was born on March 11, 1970, in San Francisco, and grew up in the city's Fillmore District.

== Musical career ==
Andre Nickatina first appeared on the Bay Area rap scene in 1993 underneath the stage name Dre Dog. He released two albums under the stage name Dre Dog: The New Jim Jones in 1993 and I Hate You With a Passion in 1995. I Hate You With a Passion peaked at #79 on the Billboard Top R&B/Hip-Hop Albums chart and #3 on the Billboard Heatseekers chart. In 1997, Adams changed his stage name to Andre Nickatina, and released the albums: Cocaine Raps under his own label, Filmoe Coleman Records and Raven in My Eyes, which was released under the Bay Area Independent Rap Label Dogday Records. Unlike his albums released under the name Dre Dog, Cocaine Raps had deeper production values [First Collaborations with Producer Nick Peace]. The album Raven in My Eyes was noted for its production quality and songs that combine "sequencers and keyboards that buzz and whine" with live instrumentation. That year, he founded his own record label, Filmoe Coleman Records. Nickatina explained in an interview with Strivin magazine that his name change was "for the better" and that he raps because he feels that he is talented enough to do so but not for the sake of popularity.

Soon afterwards, his following three albums, Tears of a Clown (1999), Daiquiri Factory: Cocaine Raps, Vol. 2, The Unreleased [Sold exclusively at shows and appearances] and These R the Tales (the latter three in 2000) gained him notoriety in the West Coast underground rap scene. Mosi Reeves of the San Francisco Bay Guardian noted Nickatina's popularity at a CD release party for another underground Bay Area rapper/producer, Smoov-E; Reeves called Nickatina "a quick-witted rapper who spits as hard as Kurupt does". A combo CD/movie project, Conversation with a Devil, followed in 2003. Lindsay Welnick, a music critic for SF Weekly, regarded the film as a knockoff of the classic gangster movie Scarface. Nate Denver for the SF Bay Guardian praised the album, though. Another album, The Gift followed in 2005, when the newspaper SF Weekly named Nickatina the "Best Local Hip Hop Legend" of that year. That same year, he would collaborate with Ilych Sato, better known as Equipto, for his 14th studio album titled "Horns and Halos", which would be accompanied by two sequels later that year and in the following year. Also, in 2005, Nickatina won the first annual Bay Area Raps Awards for Best Underground Artist. In 2008, he released A Tale of Two Andres with Mac Dre. Although they released only three songs together ("Andre N Andre", "U Beezy", "My Homeboy's Chevy"), they were close friends and the album was a tribute to his memory. Nickatina's self-entitled 2013 album debuted at #46 on the R&B/Hip-Hop Albums chart and #12 on the Heatseekers Albums chart, and at a time appeared on iTunes' main albums chart, making it his most successful album to date.

In 2020, Nickatina released a line of sneakers called "Killer Whales" with the Clothing Coach. Also in 2020, Nickatina appeared on San Francisco rapper Dregs One's single "Fog Mode" and in the accompanying music video.

== Discography ==
=== Studio albums ===
Title	Release	Peak chart positions		
Title	Release	US R&B	US Heat	US Heat (Pacific)
The New Jim Jones (as Dre Dog)	Released: June 17, 1993; Label: In-A-Minute	—	—	—
I Hate You with a Passion (as Dre Dog)	Released: April 19, 1995; Label: In-A-Minute	79	—	7
Cocaine Raps	Released: 1997; Label: Fillmoe Coleman	—	—	—
Raven in My Eyes	Released: June 23, 1997; Label: Dogday	—	—	—
Tears of a Clown	Released: May 18, 1999; Label: Fillmoe Coleman	—	—	—
Daiquiri Factory: Cocaine Raps, Vol. 2	Released: June 2, 2000; Label: Million Dollar Dream	—	—	—
These R the Tales	Released: November 7, 2000; Label: Fillmoe Coleman	—	—	—
Conversation with a Devil - CR3	Released: April 22, 2003; Label: Fillmoe Coleman	—	—	3
Bullets, Blunts In Ah Big Bankroll	Released: June 6, 2004; Label: Nicky Rose	—	—	—
Booty Star: Glock Tawk	Released: September 18, 2007; Label: Nicky Pearl	—	—	—
Khan! The Me Generation	Released: April 4, 2010; Label: Fillmoe Coleman	40	—	—
Andre Nickatina	Released: September 24, 2013; Label: Fillmoe Empire	46	12	1
Pisces	Released: March 30, 2018; Label: 75 Girls	—	—	—
DRUGZ	Released: April 3, 2020; Label: 75 Girls	—	—	—

=== Collaboration albums ===
- Midnight Machine Gun, Rhymes, And Alibis (with Equipto) (2002)
- Horns And Halos (with Equipto) (2005)
- Gun-Mouth 4 Hire: Horns And Halos 2 (with Equipto) (2005)
- Bullet Symphony: Horns And Halos 3 (with Equipto) (2006)
- A Tale Of Two Andres (with Mac Dre) (2008)
- The King And Mr. Biscuits (with Smoov-E) (2010)
- My Middle Name Is Crime EP (with The Jacka) (2010)
- Cooking On A Come Up EP (with CB Fam Bizz) (2019)
- Andre Nickatina & Reign (with Reign) (2025)
- Put That On The Gooch (with B-Legit & CB Fam Bizz) (2026)

=== Compilation albums ===
- Unreleased (2001)
- Hell's Kitchen (2002)
- Khanthology: Cocaine Raps 1992–2005 (2006)
- Khanthology 2: Cocaine Raps 1992–2008 (2009)
- Cocaine Inc. (Cocaine Raps Vol.1, Vol.2, Vol.3) (2009)

=== Soundtrack albums ===
- The Gift (2005)
- Ugly Money (2007)
- Ugly Money 2: Love It And Count It (2009)
- Reimagined By Symphony (Live & Studio Album) (2024)

=== Mixtapes ===
- Green Eyes (2003)
- Tales Of II Andre's (with Mac Dre) (2006)
- The Wrath Of Khan (hosted by Demolition Men) (2007)
- Where's My Money (2012)

=== Extended plays ===
- Cupid Got Bullets 4 Me (2014)

Singles

- The Ave (1994)
- Mutha*#!=@R (1994)
- Chocolate Ty (1994)
- Situation Critical (1995)
- 3AM (1997)
- Carnival (1997)
- Scottie 15 (featuring Shag Nasty) (1998)
- My Rap World (1999)
- Sun Duck Kim (1999)
- AYO (featuring San Quinn) (2002)
- He Said, She Said (featuring Michael Marshall) (2002)
- All Star Chuck Taylor’s (2002)
- Hells Kitchen (featuring Saafir) (2002)
- Conversation With The Devil (2003)
- Smoke Dope & Rap (2003)
- Nickatina Says (2003)
- Andre Nickatina & Equipto - Heelz (2005)
- Andre Nickatina & Equipto - Boss Soss Talk (2005)
- Yeah (featuring Messy Marv) (2006)
- No Mo Kaine (2009)
- 1-Flight (featuring Lawrence W) (2010)
- Call The Dealer (2011)
- Still Gon Ball (featuring J. Valentine & Messy Marv) (2011)
- Queen Heroin (2011)
- Jelly (featuring Problem aka Jason Martin) (2012)
- Jelly 2.0 (featuring D-LO, Mistah F.A.B., & Problem aka Jason Martin) (2012)
- Break Bread (featuring Richie Rich & Traxamillion) (2013)
- Runaway (featuring Deltrice) (2015)
- Phat Ass (featuring Speaker Child) (2017)
- Andre Nickatina & CB Fam Bizz - Glazed (2019)
- 90-25 (Remix) (featuring Pimpton) (2019)
- Andre Nickatina & Reign - Say Jack (featuring The Jacka) (2019)
- Andre Nickatina & Reign - Backwoods (2021)
- Andre Nickatina & Reign - PNB (2024)
- Put That On The Gooch (featuring B-Legit) (2025)
