= Supernatural (rapper) =

American rapper (born 1970)

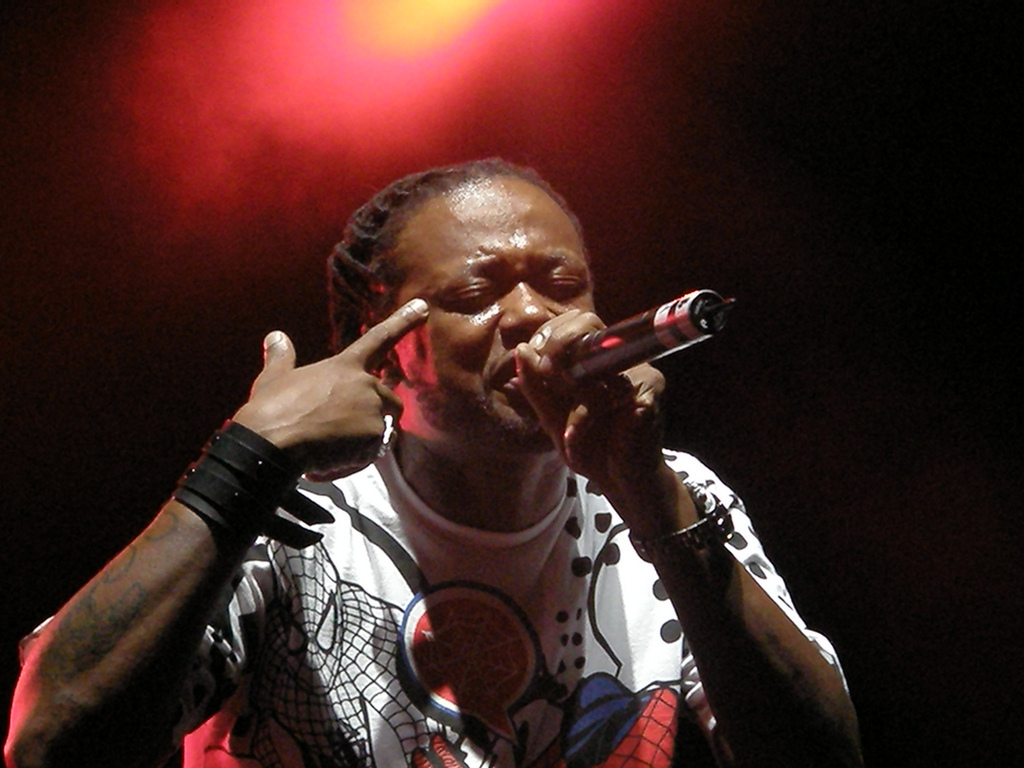
- Super Nat performing live in 2008

Background information
- Also known as: Infinite Rhymes
- Born: Reco Dewayne Price; April 23, 1970 (age 56); Marion, Indiana, U.S.
- Origin: The Bronx, New York City, U.S.
- Genres: Alternative hip hop; Underground hip hop; Freestyle rap
- Years active: 1989–present
- Labels: Babygrande; Up Above

Reco Dewayne Price (born April 23, 1970), better known by his stage name Supernatural (a.k.a. Super Nat or MC Supernatural) is an American rapper best known for his "on-the-spot" freestyle and battle rap abilities. He has been a regular performer and host of the Rock the Bells Music Festival since its beginning in 2004.

== Biography ==
Born in Marion, Indiana, Supernatural began rhyming at the age of 14. Moving to New York City at the age of 19, Supernatural began to make a name for himself on the hip hop scene and by 1993 he won the New Music Seminar. A week prior he was signed by Elektra Records, where he recorded an album titled "Natural Disasters". His first worldwide known single was "Buddha blessed it". He had landed a radio-show on 98.7 Kiss-FM 1994 where he met KRS-One from the group Boogie Down Productions who became not only a friend but his business manager. He is renowned for his improvisational talents, or freestyle, about which he said in a 1997 interview, "my definition of a freestyle is coming from the deepest realms of improvisational skills. Just being able to formulate and make rhymes on the spot that's the definition of a freestyle. Freestyle is the highest form of expression through one's self".

A compilation album of previously recorded tracks entitled The Lost Freestyle Files was released in 2003. Supernatural has said in press that "this was something that I wanted to put out as like a piece of my history", and "there are little tid-bits and pieces of history on there that the real heads like to have, and it takes you back to those times. You got the dates on there, when you see the whole cover it has all the dates, and what I was doing at the time in there so you know".

In the end 2005 MC Supernatural has also released a second full-length album, called S.P.I.T. (Spiritual Poetry Ignites Thought) (2005, Up Above Records), which featured Raekwon (of the Wu-Tang Clan), B-Real (of Cypress Hill), and Chali 2na (of Jurassic 5) and had Producers like Vitamin D, Jake One, Bean One, Marco Polo, DJ Muggs, DJ Khalil, DJ Rhettmatic and Evidence (of the Dilated Peoples).

Supernatural's story and performances are reported in the 2005 documentary film Freestyle: The Art of Rhyme, which contains clips of his and Craig G's battle and of the epic battle between Supernatural and MC Juice.

On August 5, 2006, Supernatural set a new world record for the longest continuous freestyle rap at the Rock The Bells Festival in San Bernardino, CA. where he rapped for 9 hours and 15 minutes.

Alongside Mark Battles, Freddie Gibbs and Dorian, Supernatural is one of the only rappers from Indiana to become widely known in the music industry.

== Other appearances ==
- Supernatural is seen in the documentary Freestyle: The Art of Rhyme (2000).
- He is credited as a commentator in Midway's basketball game, NBA Ballers.
- Supernatural appeared on Assassin (French hip-hop classic) on the single "Undaground Connexion" in September, 1996 as well as the 2000 Assassin LP "touche d'espoir" with Rockin' Squat on "Undaground Connexion Part. II".
- Supernatural is mentioned at the end of the Tech N9ne song 'Show Me a God'
- "Internationally Known" appears on the soundtrack of the 2003 video game Tony Hawk's Underground
- An instrumental version of "Victory" is heard in the video game Midnight Club 3: DUB Edition

== Discography ==
=== Solo ===
- 2000: Natural Disasters (Recorded 1994)
- 2003: The Lost Freestyle Files (Babygrande Records)
- 2005: S.P.I.T. (Up Above Records)

=== Guest appearances ===
Year	Song	Artist	Album
1998	"Revelation 33 1/3 Revolutions"	Public Enemy	He Got Game OST
2000	"Big Dreams"	DJ Honda	2000
2003	"B Boyz" "Bomb Bomb" "I'm Ready (Y'all Ain't Ready For This)"	will.i.am	Must B 21
2009	"Tribute To The Breakdancer"	Grandmaster Flash	The Bridge - Concept of a Culture
