= Fulton 55 =

Music venue in Fresno, California, US

- Interactive map of Fulton 55
- Address: 875 Divisadero Street; Fresno, CA 93721
- Coordinates: 36.743702°N 119.800677°W
- Capacity: 500

Construction
- Opened: January 28, 2011

Website
- Venue Website

Fulton 55 is a music venue in Fresno, California. The venue has hosted DJ nights, live music and private events since 2011.

== History ==
In 2009, a three-person ownership group purchased a vacant office building on the northwest corner of Fulton and Divisadero Streets in downtown Fresno. The group began rehabbing the building, planning on turning it into a new music venue called Fulton 55. Mid-2010, the group applied for the required permits and hired Tony Martin and a staff to manage the music side of the operation. Martin was previously the general manager of a Tower District venue named Club Fred, after the owner Fred Martinez. That venue was later renamed Audie's Olympic Tavern and closed its doors in 2016 following a tenant dispute. Martin had also worked for booking agents and at Pollstar, a live entertainment industry trade publication and data company.

As the venue's planning commission permits were under review, some opponents to the plan emerged. Neighboring businesses and religious-based organizations voiced concerns about crowds, traffic and the serving of alcohol late at night. These concerns were addressed by the management of Fulton 55 in a community meeting in November 2010, and the city Planning Commission unanimously approved the permits following that community meeting.

The first live show was on January 28, 2011. Since opening, the venue has hosted DJ nights, private events and local bands, as well as performances by well known names, including Sir Mix-a-Lot, Dinosaur Jr., Tab Benoit, Everlast, Enuff Z'Nuff and Afroman.

The venue was shut down in 2020 due to the outbreak of COVID-19. Some shows were broadcast online with no live audience. New flooring, projectors and lighting were installed during the shutdown, as well as a new mural on the building exterior by local artist Josh Wigger. It reopened to guests in July 2021.

== Venue information ==
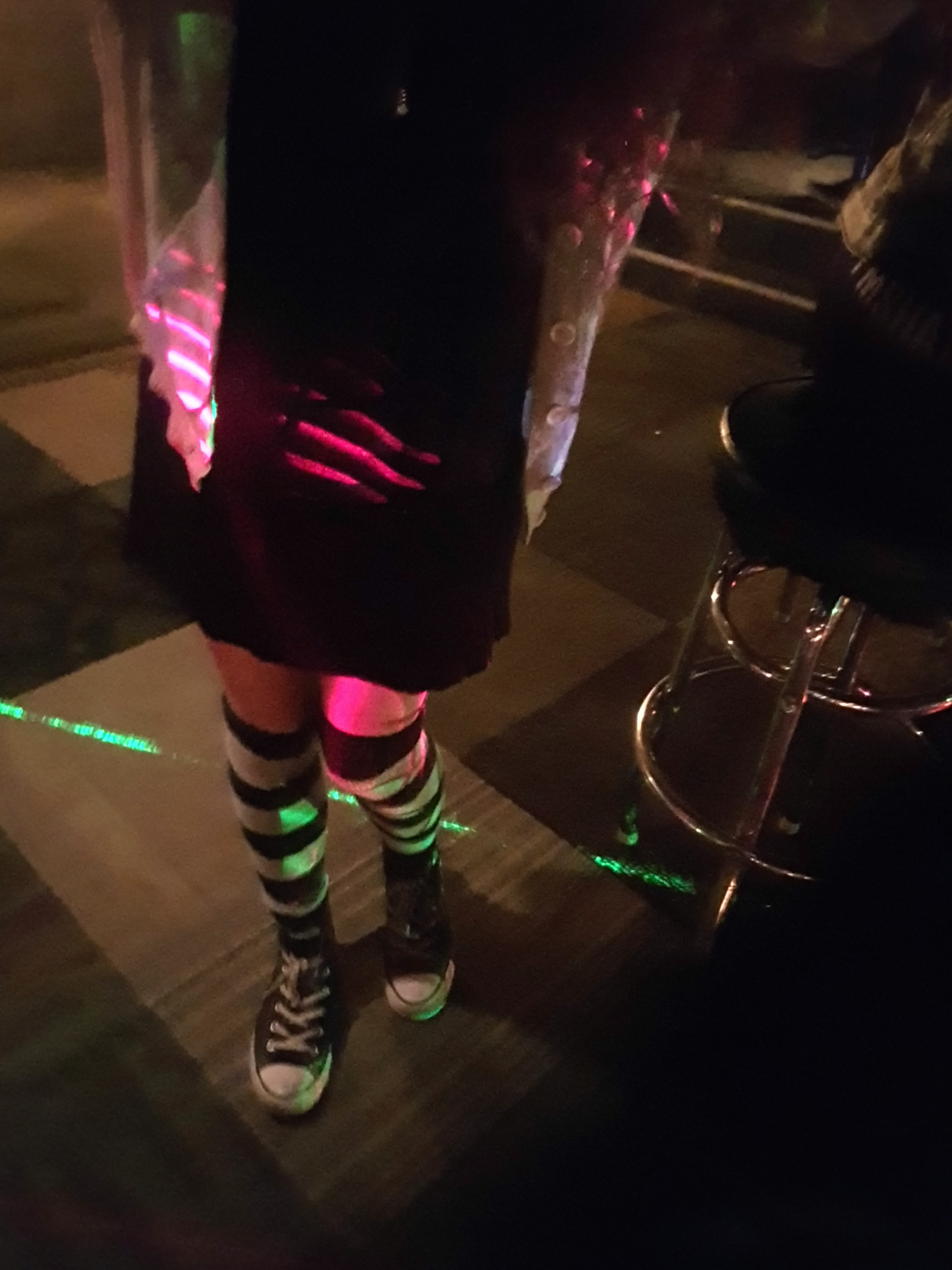
An emo concertgoer at Fulton 55

The name Fulton 55 was derived from the street the building sits on, Fulton street, in the Mural District of downtown Fresno. It is also less than a mile from the historic Fulton Mall.

It is a 7,500-square-foot (700 m^{2}) venue that holds 500 people. It has two stories, with the second level looking down onto the stage. There are bars and restrooms on both floors, plus a green room on the side of the stage.

The venue fulfills a niche as a mid-size place to host bands that would typically pass Fresno when touring California, traveling from Los Angeles or the Bay Area. Fulton 55's capacity of 500 is positioned between large local venues such as the Save Mart Center or Selland Arena and small local bars. General Manager Tony Martin cited the Great American Music Hall in San Francisco as a comparable venue.
