= Like (music producer) =

US record producer, recording artist

- Born: Gabriel Stevenson
- Origin: Los Angeles, California, U.S.
- Genres: Hip hop; R&B
- Occupations: Record producer; rapper; DJ; songwriter
- Instruments: Maschine; Logic Pro; Ableton
- Years active: 2006–present
- Member of: Pac Div
- Website: callmelike.com

Gabriel Stevenson, professionally known as Like, is an American record producer, rapper, DJ and songwriter. A three time Grammy nominee, he began working with the Pacific Division (along with his brother Mibbs and BeYoung), a hip hop trio, better known as Pac Div in 2006.

In 2012, he produced Kendrick Lamar's "Sing About Me" from Good Kid, M.A.A.D City. He received two Grammy Award nominations at the 56th Grammy Awards: Album of the Year and Best Rap Album. In 2016, he produced Anderson .Paak's "Room in Here" featuring The Game and Sonyae Elise on the Malibu album. The album received a Grammy nomination for Best Urban Contemporary Album at the 59th Annual Grammy Awards. Like has production credit with artists such as Mac Miller, Ab-Soul, Joey Badass, Nick Grant, Asher Roth, Ill Camille and Currensy.

Like has released music as a solo artist. He released instrumental albums, Zesty and Lightwork in 2014 and Emeralds in 2016. On September 30, 2016, he released his first solo rap album, Songs Made While High, which features Anderson .Paak, Buddy, and Kali Uchis.

In 2017, Pac Div regrouped and released their third album First Baptist in 2018.

== Discography ==
=== Instrumental / solo projects ===
- All Songs produced by Like

Year	Title
2014	Zesty
2014	Lightwork
2016	Emeralds
2016	Songs Made While High

=== Pac Div studio albums ===
Year	Title
2011	The DiV
2012	GMB
2018	First Baptist
2026	Still Sealed, Vol. 1

=== Pac Div mixtapes ===
Year	Title
2006	Sealed for Freshness: The Blend Tape
2009	Church League Champions
2010	Don't Mention It
2011	Mania

=== Pac Div EPs ===
Year	Title
2009	Pac Div EP

=== Production credits ===
List of single songs produced by Like with other performing artists, showing year released and album name
Year	Artist(s)	Title	Album	Label
2011	Pac Div	"Posted" (produced with DJ Dahi)	The DiV	RBC Records; E1 Music
2011	Pac Div	"Move On" (produced with DJ Dahi)	The DiV	RBC Records; E1 Music
2011	Pac Div	"High Five"	The DiV	RBC Records; E1 Music
2011	Pac Div	"Number 1" (produced with DJ Dahi)	The DiV	RBC Records; E1 Music
2011	Pac Div	"Brown"	The DiV	RBC Records; E1 Music
2011	Pac Div	"Number 1.1" (Remix)	The DiV	RBC Records; E1 Music
2011	Mac Miller	"Family First" (featuring Talib Kweli)	I Love Life, Thank You	Self-released
2012	Pac Div	"Sneaker Boxes" (featuring Chip Gnarly and Big Sik)	GMB	RBC Records; eOne
2012	Pac Div	"Faircrest Heights (Interlude)"	GMB	RBC Records; eOne
2012	Pac Div	"Can't Help It"	GMB	RBC Records; eOne
2012	Pac Div	"Savages" (featuring Big Sik and Edbone)	GMB	RBC Records; eOne
2013	Kendrick Lamar	"Sing About Me"	good kid, m.A.A.d city	Interscope Records; Top Dawg Entertainment; Aftermath Entertainment
2014	Ab-Soul	"Just Have Fun" (produced with Blended Babies)	These Days...	Top Dawg Entertainment
2014	Nikki Jean	"Cool On You" (produced with Peter Cottontale)	Champagne Water (EP)	
2015	Currensy	"Cruzin.." (produced with Acebranding)	Canal Street Confidential	Jet Life Recordings; Atlantic Records
2016	Anderson .Paak	"Room in Here" (featuring The Game and Sonyae Elise)	Malibu	ArtClub International; Empire Distribution; OBE; Steel Wool Records
2016	Chris Miles	"Wake Up"	Milestones (EP)	
2016	Duckwrth	"Get Uugly" (featuring Georgia Anne Muldrow)	I'm Uugly	Them Hellas; The Blind Youth; Empire Distribution
2016	Nick Grant	"The Game" (featuring Like and Tessa)	Non-album single	Culture Republic
2017	Asher Roth	"That's All Mine" (featuring Jesse Boykins III)	Non-album single	Retrohash
2017	Joey Badass	"Babylon" (featuring Chronixx; produced with 1-900)	All-Amerikkkan Badass	Pro Era Records; Cinematic Music Group
2017	Ill Camille	"São Paulo" (featuring Punch and Rose Gold)	Heirloom	
2020	Channel Tres	"Fuego" (featuring Tyler, the Creator)	I Can't Go Outside (EP)	Art for Their Good

=== Guest appearances ===
- List of features with other performing artists, showing year released and album name

Year	Artist(s)	Title	Album	Label
2011	Polyester The Saint	"My Way"	Peace Love Unity Respect	Frank Radio; IHipHop Distribution
2013	Blu	"Boyz N the Hood"	Good to Be Home	New World Color; Nature Sounds
2015	Blended Babies	"Shadows"	Non-album single	BBMG
2016	Nick Grant	"The Game"	Non-album single	Culture Republic
2016	Wontu	"Puccio"	Volume Two	EveryDejaVu
2016	Hollywood Floss	"Face Your Fears"	Non-album single	Hollywood Floss
2017	Justing and the Honored None	"Sunshine"	Wanderlust	Justin and the Honored None
2017	Coin Banks	"Hatches"	Heads (EP)	Low Key Source

== Nominations and awards ==
=== Grammy Awards ===
The Grammy Awards are awarded annually by the National Academy of Recording Arts and Sciences of the United States. Like has received three nomination.

Year	Award name	Artist	Title	Label	Win/Nominations
2013	Album of the Year	Kendrick Lamar	I'm Dying of Thirst	Good Kid Maad City (LP)	Nomination
2013	Best Rap Album	Kendrick Lamar	I'm Dying of Thirst	Good Kid Maad City (LP)	Nomination
2017	Best Urban Contemporary Album	Anderson .Paak	Room In Here	Malibu (LP)	Nomination
