= Good to Be Home =

Studio album by Blu
- Released: May 19, 2014
- Recorded: 2013 – 14
- Genre: Alternative hip-hop
- Length: 75:51
- Labels: New World Color; Nature Sounds
- Producer: Bombay

Blu chronology
Gods in the Spirit (2013)	Good to Be Home (2014)

Singles from Good to Be Home
- 1. "The West" Released: March 11, 2014

Good to Be Home is a studio album by American hip-hop recording artist Blu. The album was released on May 19, 2014, by New World Color and Nature Sounds. Good to Be Home features guest appearances from Fashawn, Casey Veggies, Prodigy, Mitchy Slick, Phil Da Agony, Pac Div, Imani, The Visionaries, Oh No, The Alchemist, Evidence, Planet Asia, and Krondon among others. It was produced in its entirety by Bombay.

== Background ==
In 2013, Blu released his previous album York and a pair of EPs with Madlib and M.E.D., along with Gods in the Spirit with producer Nottz. Following that later in 2013, Blu announced the collaborative album with producer Bombay titled Good to B Home. He said that linking with Bombay made him think that he "just fell into heaven." Upon its release date announcement in March 2014, Good to Be Home was described as an unapologetic celebration of Blu's hometown, Los Angeles, and was called his most defining effort to date.

The album's cover artwork and track listing was revealed on April 9, 2014. It confirmed guest appearances on the album from; Prodigy, Mitchy Slick, Phil Da Agony, The Alchemist, Evidence, Planet Asia, Krondon, Fashawn, Like & BeYoung of Pac Div, LMNO and 2Mex of The Visionaries, Casey Veggies, Oh No, Imani of The Pharcyde, Definite, Big Dame, Coss, Thurz, MED, Clutch, Tristate, Mic Holden, Donel Smokes, Chace Infinite, Swt Pea, Secret Service Agents, Bombay and Arima Ederra.

== Release and promotion ==
The album's first single "The West" produced by Bombay was released on March 11, 2014. On March 25, 2014, Blu released the third part of his So(ul) Amazing mixtape series to build anticipation for this album. Unlike previous Blu releases that have leaked online and later been re-packaged in physical form, Good to Be Home contains 20 tracks of brand new, previously unheard material.

Good to Be Home was released on May 20, 2014, and is available in double disc CD, double cassette and double LP formats. Additionally, there were 1000 translucent gold vinyl copies available. Meanwhile, a deluxe edition, limited to 200 units, included the double CD, double cassette and gold vinyl along with a T-shirt, poster, limited edition 7″ of "The West" and various other items.

== Critical reception ==
Professional ratings
Review scores
Source	Rating
Exclaim!	8/10
HipHopDX	4/5 stars
Pitchfork	6.5/10
Potholes In My Blog	3.5/5 stars
XXL	3/5 stars

Upon its release, Good to Be Home was met with generally positive reviews. At Metacritic, which assigns a normalized rating out of 100 to reviews from critics, the album received an average score of 73, based on 4 reviews, indicating "generally favorable reviews". Del F. Cowie of Exclaim! said it was "easily his best and most consistent release since Below the Heavens." Closing his review saying, "for the most part, Bombay's soul-soaked tracks are the ideal bedfellow for Blu's hopscotch rhyme style, allowing him to retain the sense of unpredictability that he so clearly treasures while delivering the focused return those in his corner always knew he was capable of."

== Track listing ==
All tracks are produced by Bombay

Disc 1
No.	Title	Writer(s)	Length
1.	"Home"	Johnson Barnes	4:18
2.	"The Return"	Barnes	4:54
3.	"Back Home Again"	Barnes	1:52
4.	"Boyz N the Hood" (featuring Fashawn, Like, and BeYoung)	Barnes; Santiago Leyva	4:15
5.	"Whip Creme (Part One)" (featuring Definite, Big Dame, Coss, and Swt Pea)	Barnes	4:33
6.	"The West"	Barnes	2:46
7.	"The 50z"	Barnes	3:17
8.	"The LA" (featuring Secret Service Agents)	Barnes	3:50
9.	"Summer Time" (featuring Bombay and Arima Ederra)	Barnes	2:55
10.	"The Summer / Angel Dust" (featuring LMNO, 2Mex, and Imani)	Barnes; Alejandro Ocana; Emandu Wilcox	5:15

Disc 2
No.	Title	Writer(s)	Length
1.	"Rap Dope"	Barnes	3:28
2.	"Dre Day"	Barnes	1:49
3.	"Red & Gold" (featuring Prodigy, Mitchy Slick, and Phil Da Agony)	Barnes; Albert Johnson; Charles Mitchell	4:18
4.	"Child Support"	Barnes	3:12
5.	"Well Fare" (featuring Thurz and Casey Veggies)	Barnes; Yannick Koffi; Casey Jones	3:12
6.	"He Man"	Barnes	4:22
7.	"Brown Sugar" (featuring MED and Oh No)	Barnes; Nick Rodriguez; Michael Jackson	5:00
8.	"Bobby Brown" (featuring Clutch, Mic Holden, and Definite)	Barnes	3:13
9.	"Can't Stop, Won't Stop" (featuring Step Brothers, Tristate, Donel Smokes, Krondon, Chace Infinite, and Planet Asia)	Barnes; Daniel Maman; Michael Perretta; Donti Ceruti; Donel Smokes; Marvin Jones; Aaron Johnson; Jason Green	6:49
10.	"The West (Part Two)"	Barnes	2:33

== Charts ==
Chart (2014)	Peak position
US Top R&B/Hip-Hop Albums (Billboard)	27
US Independent Albums (Billboard)	39
