= York (album) =

Studio album by Blu
- Released: March 26, 2013
- Recorded: 2010–11
- Genres: Hip-hop; lo-fi
- Length: 59:00
- Labels: Sire/Warner Bros; New World Color
- Producers: Exile; Flying Lotus; Samiyam; Madlib; Daedelus; Dibia$e; Knxwledge; Shafiq Husayn

Blu chronology
j e s u s (2011)	York (2013)	Gods In the Spirit (2013)

Professional ratings
Aggregate scores
Source	Rating
Metacritic	78/100
Review scores
Source	Rating
AllMusic	3/5 stars
Pitchfork	8.1/10
PopMatters	9/10
Rap Reviews	6/10

York (originally titled NoYork!) is the third studio album by American rapper Blu. The album was initially leaked during the Rock The Bells tour in August 2011, and officially released in 2013.

== Background ==
Blu was still under contract with Sire/Warner Bros in 2011, but as the LA Times noted "the slashing collection of songs was nowhere near commercial enough to ever see major label release". A few weeks later, Barnes was released from his Sire/Warner Bros. contract, although demo copies were pressed. Later officially released through New World Color on March 26, 2013. The album was also released as a vinyl 4-LP set with three additional songs, "Jazmine", "Jazzmen" and "Ronald Morgan". The complete edition of the album was released on all streaming platforms on November 29, 2024, featuring all 17 tracks and the song "BNG", which was originally released as a bonus Flexi disc single alongside the album's vinyl release.

While Blu is the featured artist he was found to be "tapping a cadre of California instrumental hip-hop luminaries (...) of the Los Angeles beat scene". Many of them featured at the Low End Theory music club. These included the performers U-God, Jack Davey, Sa-Ra, Nola Darling, Cashus King, Suziana Lounge, Chop, Cherry Pop, Tiombe Lockhart, Exile, Jimetta Rose, Donel Smokes, Definite Mass, Dubble Oh, Niaa Andrews, Andy Allo, Edan, El Prez, Pac Div, Uni, J Davey, Tiron, & Ayomari.

The artwork uses a photomontage by the Japanese artist Tsunehisa Kimura titled The City Welcomes a Fresh Morning, which depicts New York City being engulfed in a waterfall.

== Critical reception ==
Jeff Weiss of the LA Times described the leaked version as touching "upon soul, jazz and straight up boom-bap rap, with Blu alternately nostalgic and forward-minded. It's an album more sincerely strange than any of the more straightforwardly weird records that are all the rage". David Amidon described this first release as "a sound that can’t currently be compared to any other vocal hip-hop album of measurable consequence, a decidedly original experience". Craig Jenkins described the official release as "the physical document of that time a gifted rapper blew off a promising record deal to geek out in the studio with friends and then came out with one of the defining documents of his scene".

Jason Lymangrover at allmusic.com was less enthusiastic and found that if the album "could be considered a success based solely on ambition, this would be a masterpiece, but as it stands, there are so many frills and guests clouding up the scenery that it’s hard to place Blu's voice among all the mess". While Steve Juon of Rap Reviews warns that "Caution is advised - Blu's brand of hip-hop on this one's not for everybody".

== Track listing ==
Standard Edition

No.	Title	Producer	Length
1.	"Doin' Nothin'" (featuring U-God)	Flying Lotus	2:41
2.	"Everything's OK" (featuring Jack Davey)	Flying Lotus	2:58
3.	"Everybody Nose" (featuring Sa-Ra & Nola Darling)	Samiyam	3:43
4.	"Above Crenshaw" (featuring Co$$)	Samiyam	4:04
5.	"SLNGBNGrs"	Dibia$e	2:59
6.	"Soupa" (featuring Suzi Analogue)	Samiyam	3:08
7.	"Hours"	Daedelus	3:58
8.	"Annie Hall" (featuring Chop, Brooker T & Tiombe Lockhart)	Daedelus	4:04
9.	"Tags" (featuring Exile)	Exile	3:21
10.	"Spring Winter Summer Fall" (featuring Jimetta Rose)	Shafiq Husayn	5:26
11.	"Down to Earth" (featuring Definite, Donel Smokes & Dubble Oh)	Shafiq Husayn	3:20
12.	"My Sunshine" (featuring Nia Andrews)	Shafiq Husayn	3:27
13.	"Keep Pushinn"	Knxwledge	3:09
14.	"Doin' Something" (featuring El Prez, Pac Div, U-N-I, J*Davey, Tiron & Ayomari)	Flying Lotus	6:03

2011 promotional CD + vinyl edition
No.	Title	Producer(s)	Length
1.	"Doin' Nothin'" (featuring U-God)	Flying Lotus	2:41
2.	"Everything's OK" (featuring Jack Davey)	Flying Lotus	2:58
3.	"Everybody Nose" (featuring Sa-Ra & Nola Darling)	Samiyam	3:43
4.	"Above Crenshaw" (featuring Co$$)	Samiyam	4:04
5.	"SLNGBNGrs"	Dibia$e	2:59
6.	"Soupa" (featuring Suzi Analogue)	Samiyam	3:08
7.	"Hours"	Daedelus	3:58
8.	"Annie Hall" (featuring Cherry Pop & Tiombe Lockhart)	Daedelus	4:04
9.	"Tags" (featuring Exile)	Exile	3:21
10.	"Spring Winter Summer Fall" (featuring Jimetta Rose)	Shafiq Husayn	5:26
11.	"Down to Earth" (featuring Definite, Donel Smokes & Dubble Oh)	Shafiq Husayn	3:20
12.	"My Sunshine" (featuring Nia Andrews)	Shafiq Husayn	3:27
13.	"Jazmine" (featuring Andy Allo)	Samiyam	1:15
14.	"Jazzmen"	Madlib	2:28
15.	"Ronald Morgan" (featuring Edan)	Madlib	3:19
16.	"Keep Pushinn"	Knxwledge	3:09
17.	"Doin' Something" (featuring El Prez, Pac Div, U-N-I, J*Davey, Tiron & Ayomari)	Flying Lotus	6:03

7" flexi-disc vinyl + 2024 complete edition bonus track
No.	Title	Producer(s)	Length
1.	"BNG"	Flying Lotus	2:40
