= Suzi Analogue =

American singer-songwriter

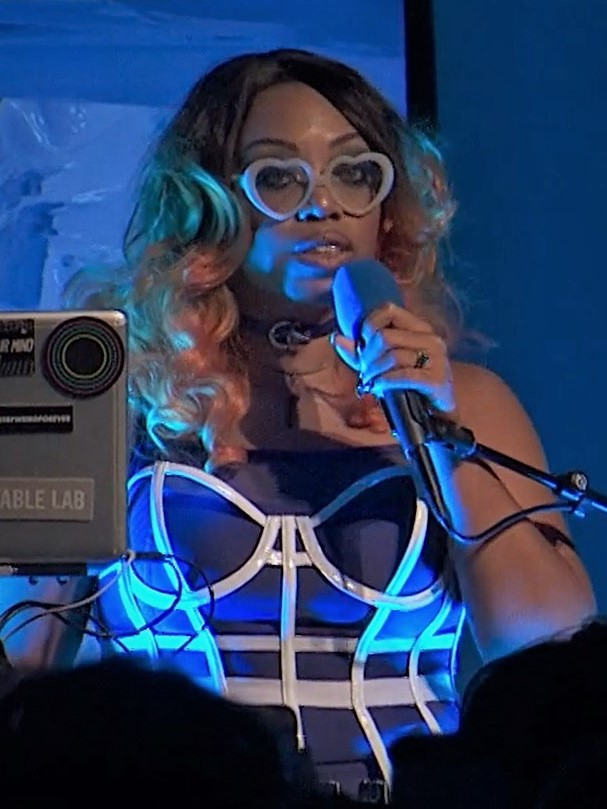
- Analogue presenting the Chromat Spring-Summer 2018 Serenity Collection at New York Fashion Week

Background information
- Born: Maya Simone Shipman; August 16, 1987 (age 39)
- Origin: Baltimore, Maryland
- Genres: Hip hop; experimental electronic music; neo soul
- Occupation: Singer Songwriter
- Years active: 2009–present
- Labels: Never Normal; Fresh Selects; Dopeness Galore
- Website: suzianalogue.com

Maya Simone Shipman (born August 16, 1987), known professionally as Suzi Analogue, is an American recording artist, musician, and songwriter based in New York City. She is a former member of Klipmode alongside Mndsgn, Devonwho, & Knxwledge; with many collaborations between them during the rise of the international beatmaking culture.

Suzi Analogue credits her name to the alter-ego of RZA, Bobby Digital, one of her favorite hip-hop producers. Her style fuses soul, hip-hop lyrics, and vocal processes characterized by synthesizers and electronic bass instruments.

== Career ==
In 2012, Suzi Analogue and Tokimonsta collaborated and released an EP as the project group Analogue Monsta. Their collaborative EP, titled "Boom", was released by Scion Audio/Visual. A year later, she launched her own record label, Never Normal Records. Her first project released on the Never Normal label, "CHILLS + THRILLS", was named "Best Cassette Of 2014" by UK's FACT Magazine.

Suzi Analogue has been featured on BET & MTV, among others, speaking about women in the male-dominated music industry.

Suzi Analogue has been a featured musician in several projects from American synthesizer company Moog Music, including playing live at Moog's largest modern music installation. She has also been a selected artist by Moog Music and Converse Music to record special Moog synthesizer sessions.

Suzi Analogue has served as a cultural diplomat for the USA in Uganda, Africa as a part of an international hip-hop music initiative "Next Level" founded by the U.S. Department of State and University Of North Carolina Chapel Hill Music Department. During her diplomacy, Suzi taught a production course to upcoming beat makers in Uganda's capital Kampala using Ableton Live. She also orchestrated music with a team of other US Hip-Hop artists and traditional Ugandan musicians and was on national Ugandan TV and radio.

Suzi Analogue continues to make audio/visual projects and perform music live in cities worldwide. She performed a live set on Boiler Room for the Teklife release of DJ Earl's '"Open Your Eyes" album, which she also collaborated on. The release went on to be named in the "20 Best Electronic Albums Of 2016" by Pitchfork.

== Discography ==
=== Albums ===
- World. Excerpts 1-9 - (Fresh Selects Records) (2009)
- NNXTAPE - (Klipmode) (2010)
- ZONEZ V.1: The Audio Visual Moodboard (Never Normal Records) (2016)
- ZONEZ V.2: The Audio Visual Moodboard (Never Normal Records) (2016 )

=== EP's ===
- 3P-(Klipmode) (2009)
- NNXT - (with Georgia Anne Muldrow, Dudley Perkins) (Dopeness Galore) (2011)
- ACAPULCOS - (Self Released) (2011)
- (R)OSE (A)LWAYS (W)INS. - (Self Released) (2012)
- Chills + Thrills - (Never Normal Records) (2014)

=== Collaborative albums ===
- BOOM (with TOKiMONSTA) - (Scion Audio/Visual) (2012)
- Love Affairz V.1 (with Swarvy) - (Never Normal Records) (2014)

=== Mixes ===
- SMOOTHIE (For Vice Magazine) - (2012)
- Boiler Room Live Set Mix - (2016)

=== Features ===
- Analogue Monsta - Nxt Msg (Deletion Mix) from Brownswood Bubblers 5 (2010)
- James Kelly - Money from LMNO (2010)
- Blu - Soupa from York (2013)
- Onra - Vibe With U from Fundamentals (2015)
- DJ Earl - All Inn from Open Your Eyes (2016)
- Quelle Chris - Calm Before from Being You Is Great, I Wish I Could Be You More Often (2017)
