= The Diam Piece =

Studio album by Diamond D
- Released: September 30, 2014
- Recorded: 2012–2014
- Studio: Diamond Mine Studios (South Orange, NJ)
- Genre: Hip-hop
- Length: 59:11
- Label: Dymond Mine
- Producer: Diamond D; DJ Scratch

Diamond D chronology
The Huge Hefner Chronicles (2008)	The Diam Piece (2014)	The Diam Piece 2 (2019)

The Diam Piece is the fourth studio album by American rapper and record producer Diamond D. It was released on September 30, 2014, via Dymond Mine Records. Recording sessions took place at Diamond Mine Studios in South Orange. Production was handled entirely by Diamond himself, who also served as executive producer, with the exception for a bonus track produced by DJ Scratch. It features guest appearances from A.G., Black Rob, Boog Brown, Chi-Ali, Chino XL, Elzhi, Fat Joe, Freddie Foxxx, Grand Daddy I.U., Guilty Simpson, Hi-Tek, Kev Brown, Kurupt, Masta Ace, Nottz, Pete Rock, Pharoahe Monch, Rapsody, Ras Kass, Scram Jones, Skyzoo, Stacy Epps, Step Brothers, Talib Kweli, Tha Alkaholiks and The Pharcyde.

The album peaked at number 41 on the Top R&B/Hip-Hop Albums and number 23 on the Top Rap Albums charts in the United States.

Its instrumental version (composed of first 16 tracks) was released in 2015. The Diam Piece 2, the album's sequel, was released in 2019.

== Background ==
In a September 2014 interview with Unkut, Diamond D spoke about the album, saying: "It’s more or less a production LP, about two and a half years it took. A lot of tracks I didn’t even use. I had about 27 tracks but I only used 18. Some of the artists I was in the studio with, and others – because of their touring schedule and my touring schedule – I just sent them music and they sent me the session back. If the track that I give them has a sample in it that’s giving it direction then they’ll follow that. If there is no sample or concept at the beginning I just let the MC's paint their own pictures and try to figure out how can make it connect. I use a lot more live instrumentation now. I still chop and manipulate samples, but my sound just sounds bigger now. Just using better equipment so the sample frequencies are better".

== Critical reception ==
Professional ratings
Review scores
Source	Rating
Exclaim!	7/10
HipHopDX	3.5/5
RapReviews	4.5/10
XXL	XL (4/5)

The Diam Piece received generally favorable reviews from music critics. Praverb of XXL praised the album, describing it as "a blast from the past, when compilations reigned supreme. Listening this album brought back memories of SoundBombing or Lyricist Lounge, the presentation of thought out lyrics and accompanying backdrops works", calling it "real hip-hop at its best". Del F. Cowie of Exclaim! wrote: "other contributions from other producer/MCs like the Stepbrothers, Hi-Tek and Kev Brown, which look promising on paper, sometimes underwhelm detracting from the album's potency, but Diamond wisely does not completely cede the booth and he steps to the mic on a few tracks like "Superman" and "Jose Feliciano", making his most succinct observation on the Pete Rock-assisted jewel "Only Way 2 Go", on which he asserts 'All these producers want to rhyme now/ I led all that'". Dean Mayorga of HipHopDX declared: "while it is clear that Diam Piece is not without it's [sic] flaws, it is a successful return nonetheless and hopefully a foreshadowing of more to come", noting that "production on the album is centered upon varied, melodic samples and the priority of the drum beat ... however, with the current heavy sounding styles inspired either by Trap or EDM, Diamond's production—regardless of how focused it may be— lacks a certain dynamism. Instead, he favors a head-bopping groove that lulls the albums pace into a too comfortable third gear".

In his mixed review for RapReviews, Matt Jost stated: "the album simply doesn't come across the speakers as crisp and clear as it should. The mix obscures rather than highlights and too often you'll be reminded of 2000-ish beatmaking instead of vintage Diamond D".

== Track listing ==
No.	Title	Writer(s)	Length
1.	"Rap Life" (featuring Pharoahe Monch)	Troy Jamerson; Joseph Kirkland	3:00
2.	"Wheres the Love" (featuring Talib Kweli, Elzhi and Skyzoo)	Talib Kweli Greene; Jason Powers; Gregory Taylor; Kirkland	4:00
3.	"Its Nothin" (featuring Fat Joe, Chi-Ali and Freddie Foxxx)	Joseph Cartagena; Chi-Ali Griffith; James Campbell; Kirkland	3:11
4.	"Only Way 2 Go" (featuring Pete Rock)	Peter Phillips; Kirkland	2:36
5.	"Hard Days" (featuring The Pharcyde)	Emandu Wilcox; Romye Robinson; Kirkland	3:13
6.	"I Aint the One to Fuc Wit" (featuring Scram Jones)	Marc Shemer; Kirkland	2:37
7.	"Pump Ya Breaks" (featuring Rapsody, Boog Brown and Stacy Epps)	Marlanna Evans; Elsie Swann; Stacy Epps; Kirkland	3:54
8.	"Take Em Off da Map" (featuring Black Rob)	Robert Ross; Kirkland	3:40
9.	"We Are the People of the World" (featuring Kurupt and Tha Alkaholiks)	Ricardo Brown; Eric Brooks; James Robinson; Rico Smith; Kirkland	2:58
10.	"Jose Feliciano"	Kirkland	3:15
11.	"Handz Up" (featuring Hi-Tek)	Tony Cottrell; Kirkland	2:38
12.	"Pain" (featuring A.G. and Chino XL)	Andre Barnes; Derek Barbosa; Kirkland	4:16
13.	"Vanity" (featuring Nottz)	Dominick Lamb; Kirkland	2:31
14.	"Its Magic" (featuring The Step Brothers)	Alan Maman; Michael Perretta; Kirkland	2:04
15.	"The Game" (featuring Grand Daddy I.U.)	Ayub Bey; Kirkland	3:47
16.	"Let the Music Talk" (featuring Kev Brown)	Kevin Brown; Kirkland	2:53
17.	"Ace of Diamonds" (featuring Masta Ace)	Duval Clear; Kirkland	3:02
18.	"187" (featuring Guilty Simpson and Ras Kass)		2:40
19.	"Superman" (Bonus Track)	Kirkland; George Spivey	2:56
Total length:			59:11

Notes

- Songs "Ace of Diamonds" and "187" are omitted from vinyl version.

== Charts ==
Chart (2014)	Peak position
US Top R&B/Hip-Hop Albums (Billboard)	41
US Top Rap Albums (Billboard)	23
