= GMB (album) =

Studio album by Pac Div
- Released: November 27, 2012
- Recorded: 2011–2012
- Genre: Hip hop
- Length: 52:47; 65:10 (iTunes bonus tracks)
- Labels: RBC; eOne
- Producers: Pac Div (exec.); Darryl Rector (exec.); Chuck Inglish; DJ Dahi; Like; Mars (of 1500 or Nothin'); Scoop DeVille; Swiff D; Thelonious Martin

Pac Div chronology
The DiV (2011)	GMB (2012)

Singles from GMB
- 1. "Bank" Released: August 28, 2012; 2. "Black Acura" Released: October 2, 2012; 3. "Sneakerboxes" Released: December 3, 2012

GMB is the second studio album by Southern California-based hip hop trio Pac Div, released on November 27, 2012 under RBC Records and eOne It was preceded by the release of Pac Div's first studio album The DiV (2011). The acronym "GMB" stands for Gabe, Mike and Bryan, the respective first names of Like, Mibbs and BeYoung. The record features guest appearances from DJ Battlecat, Blu, Kurupt, Kendrick Lamar and Mac Miller, among others. The album has spawned three singles with "Bank," "Black Acura" and "Sneakerboxes."

GMB peaked at number 15 on the Billboard Top Heatseekers Albums and entered at number 57 on the Top R&B/Hip-Hop Albums. Upon its release, the album was met with mixed reviews from music critics.

== Critical reception ==
Professional ratings
Aggregate scores
Source	Rating
Metacritic	74/100
Review scores
Source	Rating
Consequence of Sound	3/5 stars
HipHopDX	3.5/5 stars
Okayplayer	89/100
Potholes In My Blog	3.5/5 stars
XXL	3/5 (L)

GMB received favorable reviews from contemporary music critics. At Metacritic, which assigns a normalized rating out of 100 to reviews from mainstream critics, the album received an average score of 74, which indicates "generally favorable reviews", based on four reviews. Okayplayer's Rachel Greenberg gave the album an 89 out of 100, saying: "GMB is Pac Div's best and most consistent work to date. The production knocks and Like, Mibbs, and BeYoung are more proficient at killing sh-t on the regular than Rick Grimes, with nary a weak link to be found. The best way to describe Pac Div is fact is to say they're an Okayplayer-y version of Tha Dogg Pound; more lyrical, less gangsta, but with a comparable degree of charisma, trunk-rattling bass and skirt chasing. This is their Dogg Food." HipHopDX reviewer Edwin Ortiz gave the album a 3.5 out of five, saying: "Despite its missteps, GMB is a commendable project that should hold over diehard fans. More so than anything else though, it's proof that the independent route was the right choice for Pac Div." David Reyneke of Potholes In My Blog also gave the album a 3.5 out of five, saying: "GMB is by no means a hip-hop game breaker, but it does prove that Pac Div is worth every bit of the hype that has been tossed around for nearly five years now."

In a mixed review, XXL reviewer Bogar Alonso gave the album an "L", saying: "Pac Div was hoping to achieve a harder sound with GMB, and when it comes to the tongue-in-cheek “Bank,” “Sneakerboxes,” which features Chip Gnarly & Big Silk, and “Debo,” they certainly get there. But it is when they take a more casual approach to their sound, as on “Slow,” which sounds like a club anthem lost at a children's party, or the aimlessly catchy “Can't Help It,” that they reach heights only attained by Superman. On “No Superman,” they joke that they get confused for a member of Da Bush Babees, which might not be too far off considering how much “It's All Love,” seems like a Native Tongues throwback. It also might be one of the strongest tracks of 2012. At 17-strong, and with limitless cross-over appeal, Pac Div will still get hip-hop fans across the hip-hop spectrum to “want that GMB.”" Jon Hadusek of Consequence of Sound gave the album three out of five stars, saying: GMB is a relaxed, enjoyable rap record by three dudes who have fun rhyming words together. Maybe it'll break, maybe it won't. As illustrated by “Bank,” there's a bitterness brewing; for Pac Div’s sake, let's hope it never overtakes their earnestness."

== Track listing ==
No.	Title	Producer(s)	Length
1.	"Intro"	DJ Dahi	3:47
2.	"The Return" (featuring Ty Dolla $ign)	Mars (of 1500 or Nothin')	4:00
3.	"Bank"	Scoop DeVille	3:10
4.	"Truth"	Swiff D	2:56
5.	"Sneakerboxes" (featuring Chip Gnarly and Big Sik)	Like	3:25
6.	"Faircrest Heights (Interlude)"	Like	1:44
7.	"Slow"	Chuck Inglish	4:26
8.	"Can't Help It"	Like	4:00
9.	"Fuck Y'all" (featuring Kurupt and DJ Battlecat)	DJ Dahi	5:33
10.	"Black Acura" (featuring Mac Miller)	Thelonious Martin	4:20
11.	"Automatic"	Swiff D	2:57
12.	"Cross-Trainers" (featuring Kendrick Lamar and Blu)	Swiff D	4:24
13.	"Debo"	Scoop Deville	3:42
14.	"No Superman"	Swiff D	4:26
Total length:			52:47

iTunes Deluxe edition bonus tracks
No.	Title	Producer(s)	Length
15.	"Savages" (featuring Big Sik and Edbone)	Like	3:53
16.	"La Cienaga Luxor" (featuring Big Sik)	Swiff D	3:52
17.	"It's All Love" (featuring Elway 7 and Edbone)	Swiff D	4:38
Total length:			65:10

Sample credits

- "Can't Help It" contains a sample of "I'll Never Let You Go" as performed by The Sylvers.
- "Fuck Y'all" contains a sample of "Tetris" as performed by DJ Dahi.
- "Debo" contains a sample of "Bounce" as performed by Timbaland.

== Personnel ==
Credits for GMB adapted from AllMusic and the album liner notes.

- Pac Div — primary artist, executive producer
- Blu — featured artist
- DJ Battlecat — featured artist
- Swiff D — producer
- DJ Dahi — producer
- Scoop DeVille — producer
- Edbone — featured artist
- Elway 7 — featured artist
- Chip Gnarley — featured artist
- Chuck Inglish — producer
- Kurupt — featured artist
- Kendrick Lamar — featured artist
- Like — producer
- Thelonious Martin — producer
- Mac Miller — featured artist
- Mars — producer
- Andrew Quesada — photography
- Darryl Rector — executive producer
- Kristofferson San Pablo — art direction
- Big Sik — featured artist
- Ty Dolla $ign — featured artist
- DJ Val the Vandle - DJ/Scratches

== Charts ==
Chart (2012)	Peak position
US Top Heatseekers Albums	15
US Top R&B/Hip-Hop Albums	57
