= Blu (rapper) =

American rapper (born 1983)

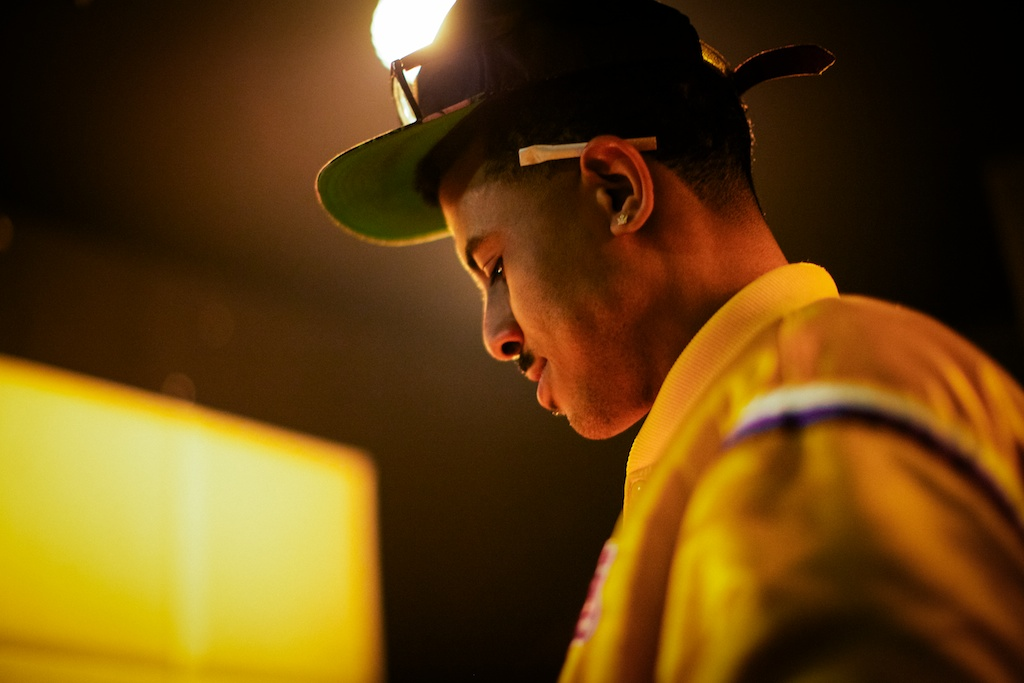
- Barnes in 2013

Background information
- Born: Johnson Barnes III; April 15, 1983 (age 43); Inglewood, California, U.S.
- Genres: Hip-hop; alternative hip-hop; lo-fi; West Coast hip-hop
- Occupations: Rapper; songwriter; record producer
- Years active: 2002–present
- Labels: Dirty Science; Fat Beats; New World Color; Sound in Color; Nature Sounds; Sire/Warner Bros.; Tres
- Member of: All City Chess Club; Blu & Exile; C.R.A.C.; Johnson&Jonson

Johnson Barnes III (born April 15, 1983), better known by his stage name Blu, is an American rapper and record producer from Los Angeles, California. He performs as one half of the duo Blu & Exile, which was formed in 2007 and who released their debut studio album, Below the Heavens in July of that year. He is also the forefront member of the California-based collective, Dirty Science. He is recognized for his collaborative albums with record producers Mainframe, Ta'Raach, Bombay, Damu the Fudgemunk, Madlib, Nottz, and Union Analogtronics. Since his debut, he has had a productive standard of releasing multiple albums.

== Musical career ==
By age 19, Blu was selling out local shows at the Knitting Factory, House Of Blues, and headlining once a month at the Rumba Room on Universal City Walk. Back then, he recorded with various rap groups such as the Ill Flava Crew, Infinite Legacy crew, The Untouchable Mob, Glory For The People, The LA Metro Crew and the Bridgetown Steel Crew. He was also a contestant on the MTV game show, "Who Knows The Band" and won. Grammy award-winning producer Megahertz had flown Blu out to New York to sign him to his new label after producing hits for Jay-Z, R Kelly, P Diddy, Busta Rhymes, and Nas but eventually walked away from the deal. At age 20, he had started negotiating a record deal with Death Row Records but decided to independently release his first solo album titled California Soul (which would be re-released onto streaming platforms on January 1, 2024). It was produced by early collaborators L's and Bombay, and featured Bridgetown crew members Donel Smokes (Black Spade) and Miguel.

=== 2005–2008: Below the Heavens, C.R.A.C. and Johnson&Jonson ===
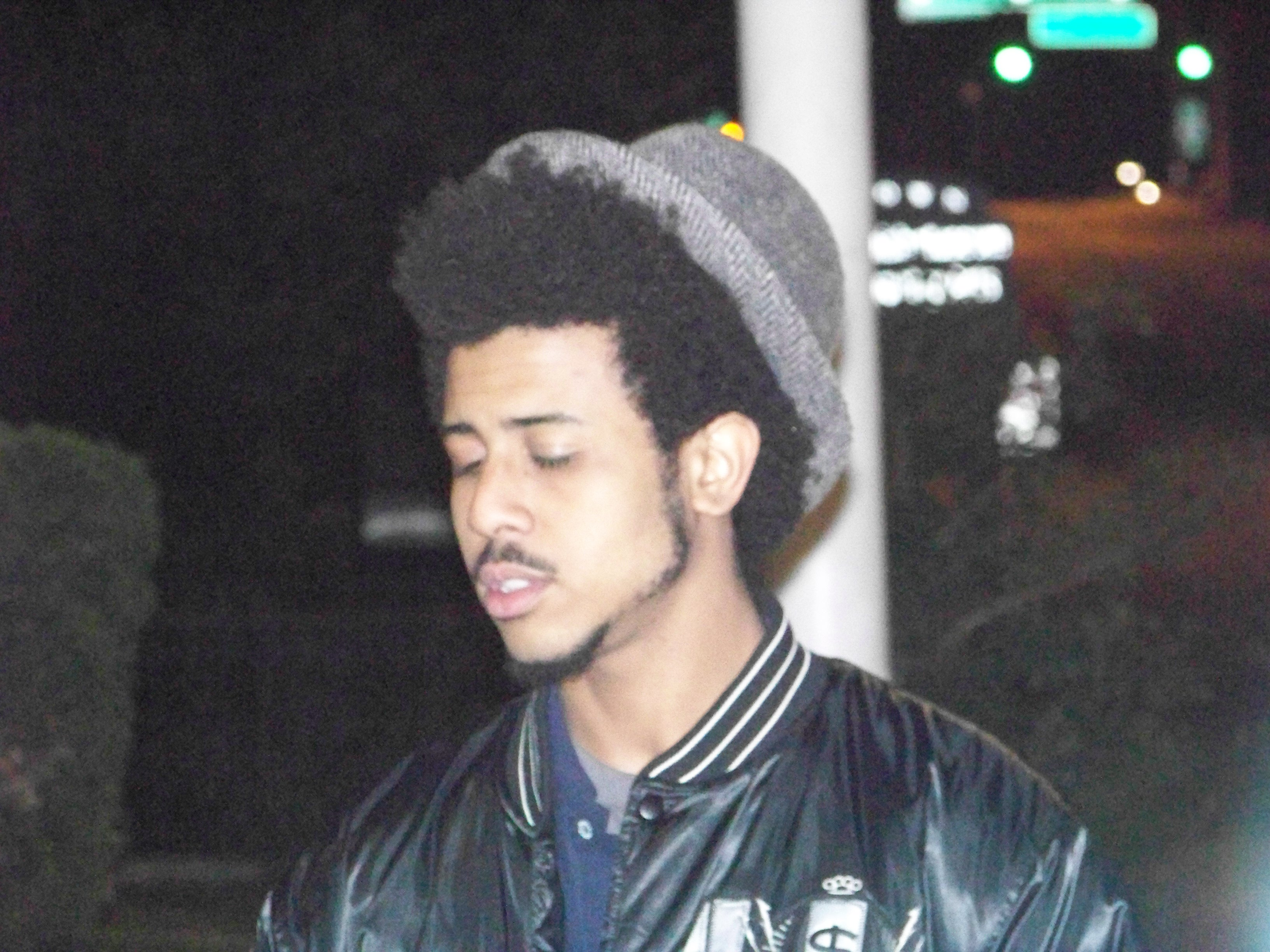
Blu in 2008

After doing a feature for the group Science Project, Blu was introduced to Aloe Blacc, who was also featured on the album. Aloe Blacc said he had heard a lot about Blu and said he should work with the DJ/producer of his group Emanon, Exile. Exile came out to a Blu show, and afterwards invited him to be on his new compilation album entitled "Dirty Science" on Sound In Color Records. After hearing Blu on various compositions throughout Exile's album, "Sound In Color" signed Blu to a one-album deal and immediately began to feature him on various releases for the label. After working with Oh No, and reaching out to J Dilla and Madlib for production on his own album, Blu decided to have Exile produce his entire LP for Sound In Color. By the time the album was done, Blu had completed two other full-length albums, one with Detroit hip-hop rapper/producer Ta'Raach and with Sound In Color/Operation Unknown producer and CEO, Mainframe.

In 2006, Blu pressed up the Lifted EP and mixtape premiering various productions with Exile and songs with J Dilla and KRS-One. While an opening act on a tour with Seattle-based LifeSavas and Dallas-based Strange Fruit Project, Blu discovered all three of his unreleased but fully completed full-length albums had leaked. The leak grew and crowds already knew his songs as he debuted them at each show for the rest of the tour. These three albums began to build a huge buzz online and caught the attention of Okayplayer, as well as other sites like HipHopDX and Nah Right, who all named him "Rookie Of The Year". The Exile-produced album was eventually released in 2007, entitled Below the Heavens. However, since the label Sound in Color were almost bankrupt, only 7,000 copies of the album was pressed on CD, with no vinyl other than the single for the album, "The Narrow Path", which was also released in 2006. The label went bankrupt a few months later following the release.

In 2008, Blu & Ta'Raach released the album titled The Piece Talks under the moniker C.R.A.C. (or C.R.A.C. Knuckles). It was completely produced by Ta'Raach and featured Shawn Jackson, Noni Lomar, and Jazmin Mitchell. Originally sold on tour in 2005, the album included their hit single, "League Leaders" (The Friar cover) and the 6 inch single, "The King".

During that same year, Blu's album with Mainframe was released under the group name Johnson&Jonson. It was produced by Mainframe with rapping by Blu (alongside some occasional rapping from Mainframe), as well as features from Gonja Sufi and Miguel. It was promoted with a mixtape called Powders & Oils, which consisted of a few more exclusive songs. All of Johnson&Jonson's music consisted of only loops and raps.

=== 2008–2011: Production moniker GODlee Barnes and Her Favorite Colo(u)r ===
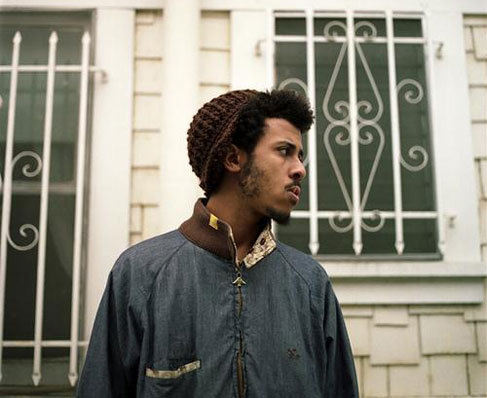
Blu in 2011

Blu used the production techniques he learned from working on albums with Exile, Mainframe, and Ta'Raach and began to produce beats. He started working on a what was intended to be a self-produced follow up to Below the Heavens. However, Blu's hard drive crashed, and the master files were lost; the album was eventually released in an unmixed and unmastered form, as a continuous mp3 file, in January 2010 under the title theGODleeBarnesLP. Blu also showcased his production on a albums including the collaboration with Brooklyn rapper and actor Sene entitled A Day Late & A Dollar Short and the instrumental album Open, which was later turned into a rap compilation of the same name, with various artists who rapped over the instrumental version of this album. Furthermore, Blu produced an album titled Her Favorite Colo(u)r for himself, which was initially released for free download online after breaking up with his girlfriend. The album was officially released in 2011.

=== 2009–2012: Sire/Warner Bros, York, Jesus, and Give Me My Flowers While I Can Still Smell Them ===
In 2009, Blu signed an artist deal, an independent film deal, as well as a label deal for his company, New World Color, with Tom Whalley at Warner Bros. Records. He then began working on a movie and album called No York. The album would feature production from Los Angeles beat scene heavyweights such as Flying Lotus, SA-RA Creative Partners, Daedelus, Madlib, Knxwledge, Samiyam, and others. The film was to be written by Blu and directed by Khalil Joseph. Eventually, labelmates began to leave the label and all the A&R representatives began to lose their jobs. Then Tom Whalley was fired and the entire label was bought out. This took place over a year and a half and brought complete stagnation to any Warner Bros. releases. Def Jam presidents and A&R's were hired by Lyor Cohen, and Kyambo Joshua became Blu's A&R representative and creative director. After so much stagnation and no one being paid for contributions, Kyambo eventually helped Blu leave the label and release his music independently. However, promo copies of No York were pressed.

Blu then released a mixtape in celebration of his independence titled Jesus, which was released under his imprint New World Color, in conjunction with Nature Sounds Records. This album was recorded in two days, produced by Blu, and featuring production from Madlib, Alchemist, Knxwledge, Hezekiah and Rome, as well as guest appearances from Planet Asia & Killer Ben of Durag Dynasty.

During Blu's stay with Sire/Warner Bros, he was given 50 beats from Exile. Blu didn't feel the production would fit his No York album, but found a bunch of old songs he wrote that had no beats. Blu recorded about 25 songs in two weeks to the Exile beats, which were later leaked online and eventually officially released under Dirty Science/Fat Beats, as Blu & Exile's Give Me My Flowers While I Can Still Smell Them. The album featured guest appearances from Fashawn, Dag Savage, and Homeboy Sandman. An instrumental version of the album was also released.

The demo songs for "No York" were released as an album titled York through New World Color. Recorded in New York and Los Angeles; and initially leaked in 2011, the album featured exclusive and previously released production from Flying Lotus, SA-RA Creative Partners, Daedelus, Madlib, Knxwledge, Dibia$e, Samiyam, and Exile. It also featured vocals from U-God, Edan, Theophilus London, SA-RA, J*Davey, Andy Also, Pac Div, UNI, Tiron, and Ayomari. York was toured along the West Coast with the live band, Koochie Monsters replaying all the songs from the album. A group with Ken Beats, co-producer of York, also spawned off under a group called Neu Ngz. They performed live but never released any material.

=== 2013–2016: Good to Be Home, Bad Neighbor and various projects with producers ===
After a lack of recently recorded albums in two years, Blu released a double album titled Good to Be Home in 2014, produced entirely by one of his earliest producers, Bombay. Released on Nature Sound Records, the album was inspired by Blu connecting back with his West Coast roots after touring the world; and features guest appearances from Prodigy, Planet Asia, Strong Arm Steady, Step Brothers, Chace Infinite, Imani, LMNO & 2Mex from the Visionaries, MED, Oh No, Fashawn, Pac Div, Co$$, Definite Mass and many others.

Blu followed up with a collaboration album with MED, produced entirely by Madlib called Bad Neighbor with features from Stones Throw alumni MF Doom, Aloe Blacc, Dam Funk, Anderson .Paak, Mayor Hawthorne, Frank Nitt and Oh No, as well as Hodgy Beats (Odd Future), AMG, and Phonte. The album was promoted by a video and single for "Burgundy Whip" with Jimetta Rose back in 2013, and followed up with the single, "The Buzz" b/w "Peroxide" featuring Dâm-Funk. The album was also released as instrumentals.

In 2013, Blu teamed up with infamous Virginia producer Nottz for the EP Gods In The Spirit which featured Homeboy Sandman, Aloe Blacc, Dag Savage, and many others. The EP was followed up in 2016 with another EP, Titans in the Flesh which featured Skyzoo, Torae, Bishop Lamont and many others. Both EP's were released under Coalmine Records, with the 2018 re-release Gods in the Spirit, Titans in the Flesh compiling both EPs into a full-length album. Other projects from 2016 included Crenshaw Jezebel with Ray West, Cheetah in the City with French production duo Union Analogtronics; and Open Your Optics to Optimism with Fa†e. Blu also released 45's with Alchemist and The 45 King.

In 2017, Blu & Exile celebrated the 10th anniversary of Below the Heavens at Regent Theater in Los Angeles, California, with a performance in its entirety with a live band.

=== 2018–2022: The Blueprint, A Long Red Hot Los Angeles Summer Night, For Sale and The Color Blu(e) ===
In March 2018, Blu released a mixtape exclusively on his Bandcamp titled The DS Dumbstyle Mixtape, Volume One; which served as a compilation of songs Blu produced for various artists including Homeboy Sandman, Sene, Roc C, ScienZe, Young RJ and MED. This was then followed up a month later by the album The Blueprint, which was entirely produced by Shafiq Husayn. His project with Nottz titled Gods in the Spirit, Titans in the Flesh, was also released the same year. In 2019, Blu teamed up with rapper/producer Oh No to release A Long Red Hot Los Angeles Summer Night, which served as a concept album based on underground life in Los Angeles.

2021 saw Blu not only release the Sirplus-produced EP For Sale, but also his first multi-produced project since 2013's York: The Color Blu(e); which was released on September 24, 2021. Preceded by the singles "People Call Me Blu(e)" and "Because the Sky is Blu(e)" and featuring production from Exile, Sirplus and J57, the project serves as a concept album that celebrates and reflects on Blu's creative journey, with the word "Blu(e)" being featured in every of the album's song titles.

=== 2023–present: Projects with various producers and streaming reissues ===
In September 2023, Blu released Bad News, a collaborative album with producer Real Bad Man, which featured guest appearances from C.L. Smooth, Planet Asia, Cashus King, Donel Smokes and Definite. This was then followed up three months later by the album Afrika, which was entirely produced by Nottz, and served as a concept album based on the diasporic connection between African Americans and Africans.

The beginning of 2024 saw Blu reissue a number of projects onto streaming platforms, including his first project California Soul, his unmastered self-produced album God is Good and his producer compilation album Open. He also released a series of extra projects, that acted as accompanying bonus material to some of his albums, including God is Good (The Bonus Songs), Back Home Again (a compilation of outtakes from the Good to Be Home sessions) and Other Shades of Blu(e) (a compilation of outtakes from The Color Blu(e) sessions).

A month later, on February 9, Blu released his first official project of the year Royal Blu, which was entirely produced by underground producer Roy Royal. On March 29, Out of the Blue, which was produced by Shafiq Husayn and was a follow up to their mixtape The Blueprint, was released. His third project of the year, Los Angeles, was produced by rapper/producer Evidence, and was released on July 12. His fourth project of the year is the Blu & Exile album entitled Love (the) Ominous World, released on September 20, 2024.

From 2025-2026, Blu collaborated on multiple tracks with rapper/producer A-F-R-O, appearing on AFRODEEZEAK II, Trap Door, and Trap Door 2.

== Discography ==
=== Studio albums ===
- California Soul (2003; officially re-released in 2024)
- Below the Heavens (with Exile, as Blu & Exile) (2007)
- The Piece Talks (with Ta'Raach, as C.R.A.C.) (2008)
- Johnson&Jonson (with Mainframe, as Johnson&Jonson) (2008)
- A Day Late & A Dollar Short (with Sene) (2009)
- TheGodleeBarnesLP (rereleased in 2021 as God is Good) (2010)
- Her Favorite Colo(u)r (2011)
- Jesus (2011)
- Give Me My Flowers While I Can Still Smell Them (with Exile, as Blu & Exile) (2012)
- York (2013)
- Good to Be Home (with Bombay) (2014)
- Bad Neighbor (with M.E.D. and Madlib) (2015)
- Cheetah in the City (with Union Analogtronics) (2016)
- Gods in the Spirit, Titans in the Flesh (with Nottz) (2018)
- The Blueprint (with Shafiq Husayn) (2018)
- A Long Red Hot Los Angeles Summer Night (with Oh No) (2019)
- Ground & Water (with Damu The Fudgemunk) (2019)
- Miles (with Exile, as Blu & Exile) (2020)
- The Color Blu(e) (2021)
- Bad News (with Real Bad Man) (2023)
- Live from the End of the World (with Fatlip) (2023)
- Live from the End of the World (Deluxe) (with Fatlip) (2023)
- Afrika (with Nottz) (2023)
- Royal Blu (with Roy Royal) (2024)
- Out of the Blue (with Shafiq Husayn) (2024)
- Los Angeles (with Evidence) (2024)
- Love (the) Ominous World (with Exile, as Blu & Exile) (2024)
- Forty (with August Fanon) (2025)
- God Takes Care of Babies & Fools (with Myka 9 and Mono En Stereo) (2025)
- Time Heals Everything (with Exile, as Blu & Exile) (2026)
- LA (with Sndtrak) (2026)

=== Compilation albums ===
Title	Album details
In the Beginning (Before the Heavens) (with Exile, as Blu & Exile)	Released: October 20, 2017; Label: Fat Beats, Dirty Science; Format: CD, digital download

=== Mixtapes ===
Title	Album details
Soul Amazing Volume 1 (with DJ Space Monkey)	Released: August 1, 2016; Label: Self-released; Format: Digital download
Soul Amazing Volume 2 (with NDJnous)	Released: August 2, 2016; Label: Self-released; Format: Digital download
Soul Amazing Volume 3 (with DJ Lowkey)	Released: August 3, 2016; Label: Self-released; Format: Digital download
Soul Amazing Volume 4 (with DJ Josh One)	Released: August 4, 2016; Label: Self-released; Format: Digital download
Soul Amazing Volume 5 (with Alchemist)	Released: August 5, 2016; Label: Self-released; Format: Digital download
Soul Amazing Volume 6 (with DJ Artistic)	Released: August 6, 2016; Label: Self-released; Format: Digital download
Soul Amazing Volume 7 (with DJ Lowkey LA)	Released: August 7, 2017; Label: Self-released; Format: Digital download
The DS Dumb Style Mixtape (produced by Blu)	Released: January 1, 2018; Label: Self-released; Format: Digital download
Soul Amazing Volume 8 (with DJ PWC)	Released: July 13, 2019; Label: Self-released; Format: Digital download
Soul Amazing Volume 9 (with DJ Cristano)	Released: November 12, 2020; Label: Self-released; Format: Digital download

=== EPs ===
Title	EP details
Gods in the Spirit (with Nottz)	Released: June 10, 2014; Label: Coalmine Records; Format: CD, digital download
Crenshaw Jezebel (with Ray West)	Released: March 25, 2016; Label: Red Apples 45; Format: Digital download, vinyl
Titans in the Flesh (with Nottz)	Released: July 15, 2016; Label: Coalmine; Format: Digital download, vinyl
Open Your Optics to Optimism (with Fate)	Released: October 17, 2016; Label: EveryDejaVu; Format: Digital download, vinyl
The Turn Up (with MED and Madlib)	Released: November 17, 2017; Label: Bang Ya Head; Format: Digital download, vinyl
True & Livin' (with Exile as Blu & Exile)	Released: May 24, 2019; Label: Dirty Science; Format: Digital download
Underground Makes the World Go Round (with Fat Jack)	Released: October 25, 2019; Label: The Order Label
The Narrative (with Mickey Factz and Nottz)	Released: August 20, 2021; Label: Soulspazm, SCHMTCS
Live from the End of the World, Vol. 1 (Demos) (with Fatlip)	Released: April 29, 2022; Label: Guilty by Association; Format: Digital download
I (with Jabee)	Released: October 14, 2022; Label: Grand Union Media, Clerestory AV; Format: Digital download

=== Singles ===
- "The Narrow Path" (2006)
- "Lemonade" (2011)
- "Cellnl's" (2011)
- "Amnesia" (2011)
- "The Buzz" b/w "Peroxide" (2013) (with MED and Madlib)
- "The Clean Hand" (2013)
- "The West" (2014)
- "The Return" b/w "Thriller" (2015)
- "Kiss the Sky" (2015)

=== Guest appearances ===
- Deep Rooted – "From the Heart" from D.E.E.P.R.O.O.T.E.D (2009)
- Tanya Morgan – "Morgan Blu" from Brooklynati (2009)
- J. Dilla – "Smoke" from Jay Stay Paid (2009)
- Alchemist – "Therapy" from Chemical Warfare (2009)
- Fashawn – "Samsonite Man" from Boy Meets World (2009)
- The Grouch & Eligh – "Old Souls" from Say G&E! (2009)
- The Roots – "Radio Daze" and "The Day" from How I Got Over (2010)
- Exile – "When Nothing's Left" from 4TRK Mind (2011)
- 9th Wonder – "Piranhas" from The Wonder Years (2011)
- MHz Legacy – "Yellow & Blue" from MHz Legacy (2012)
- Danny! – "Misunderstood" from Payback (2012)
- Pac Div – "Cross-Trainers" from GMB (2012)
- Oh No – "Jones's" from Disrupted Ads (2013)
- Roc Marciano – "Cut the Check" from Marci Beaucoup (2013)
- Statik Selektah – "My Hoe" from Extended Play (2013)
- Slum Village – "Let It Go" from Evolution (2013)
- CunninLynguists – "The Morning" from Strange Journey Volume Three (2014)
- Black Milk – "Leave the Bones Behind" from If There's a Hell Below (2014)
- Homeboy Sandman – "Loads" from Hallways (2014)
- Skyzoo & Torae – "Rediscover" from Barrel Brothers (2014)
- Step Brothers – "Tomorrow" from Lord Steppington (2014)
- L'Orange & Kool Keith – "This New World" from Time? Astonishing! (2015)
- Elliterate – "Games" from Charlie Russell (2017)
- The Funk Junkie – "As Live As It Gets (Games Redux)" from Moondirt (2017)
- Nolan The Ninja – "Lei$ure" from YEN (2017)
- Tope ft. Abstract Rude – Faithful (2018)
- Vic Deal ft. Catt – "Changing" from La Costa Nostra (2020)
- Logic – "Orville" from Vinyl Days (2022)
- Open Mike Eagle – "The Wire S3 E1" from Another Triumph of Ghetto Engineering (2023)
- Strange Dust – "Mood" from Strange Company (2024)
- Heems – "Porches" from Lafandar (2024)
- McKinley Dixon – "Could've Been Different" from Magic, Alive! (2025)
- Otis Mensah – "Turbulence" from before the noise my cousin (2025)
- A-F-R-O - "Across the Universe" (feat. 60 East, Elena Charis) from AFRODEEZEAK II (2025)
- A-F-R-O - "Riddle 2 Dribble" (feat. EKYM1536, MotionPlus, D. Blat) from Trap Door (2025)
- A-F-R-O - "Captain Now" (feat. Jon Connor, MZ1, YaH-Ra, Madd Illz, Eksale, Felcon, Rod) from Trap Door 2 (2026)
- Po3 – "Déjà Vu" (2026)
