= The Piece Talks =

Studio album by C.R.A.C.
- Released: April 22, 2008
- Recorded: 2007–2008
- Genre: Hip-hop
- Label: Tres Records
- Producer: Ta'Raach

Professional ratings
Review scores
Source	Rating
AllMusic	2008
HipHopDx	2008
Rap4Fame.de	link

The Piece Talks is the debut LP by hip-hop group C.R.A.C., made up of rapper Blu and rapper-producer Ta'Raach. C.R.A.C is an acronym standing for "Collect Respect Anna Check". Though the duo initially released the project independently, Tres Records became interested and decided to release the album commercially on April 22, 2008. Not purely a rap album, many tracks prominently feature singing and talking and are more like skits than full songs.

== Track listing ==
1. What Up (Part 2)
2. Buy Me Lunch
3. Love Don't
4. Major Way
5. Activate Too
6. CRACHAUSE
7. Respect
8. Pop Dem Boyz
9. 2.16.05
10. Mr. Big Fizz
11. Chill
12. Hello!?
13. Go!
14. Activate...As Well
15. Bullet Through Me
16. Cotton
17. Credits
18. Umm Yeah
19. Ready
