= Gods in the Spirit =

EP by Blu and Nottz
- Released: October 22, 2013
- Recorded: 2013
- Genre: Hip-hop
- Length: 23:50
- Label: Coalmine Records
- Producer: Nottz

Blu chronology
York (2013)	Gods in the Spirit (2013)	Good to Be Home (2014)

Nottz chronology
A.M.T.R.I.M. (2012)	Gods in the Spirit (2013)	Home Sweet Home (2015)

Singles from Gods In the Spirit
- 1. "Boyz II Men" Released: October 2, 2013

Gods in the Spirit is a collaborative EP by Los Angeles rapper Blu and Virginia record producer Nottz, released on October 22, 2013 through Coalmine Records. The six-track record was entirely produced by Nottz and includes guest appearances from Nitty Scott, MC, Aloe Blacc, ANTHM and Homeboy Sandman among others. The lead single, "Boyz II Men," was leaked on October 2, 2013.

== Reception ==
Professional ratings
Review scores
Source	Rating
HipHopDX	3/5 stars

HipHopDX's Dean Mayorga gave the album a three out of five, saying "While it's enjoyable to varying degrees, Gods in the Spirit is a misleading name for a project with little ambitions beyond being a good listen."

== Track listing ==
- All tracks were produced by Nottz.

No.	Title	Length
1.	"Boyz II Men" (featuring Nitty Scott, MC)	3:51
2.	"Creme of the Crop" (featuring Versis and ScienZe)	3:38
3.	"Crooks in Castles" (featuring ANTHM, Homeboy Sandman, Sene and Johaz)	4:15
4.	"End of the World" (featuring Rashad)	3:57
5.	"God S**t" (featuring Aloe Blacc, Co$$ and Definite Mass)	4:59
6.	"End of the World (Remix)"	3:10
Total length:		23:50
