= The DiV =

Studio album by Pac Div
- Released: November 8, 2011
- Recorded: 2010–2011
- Genre: Hip hop
- Labels: RBC; E1
- Producers: Pac Div (exec.); No I.D.; Like; Blended Babies; Cook Classics; DJ Dahi; Micky Park; Swiff D

Pac Div chronology
The DiV (2011)	GMB (2012)

The DiV is the debut studio album by American hip hop group Pac Div, that was released under RBC Records and E1 Music on November 8, 2011.

== Track listing ==
No.	Title	Producer(s)	Length
1.	"The Greatness"	No I.D.	3:29
2.	"Posted"	Like; DJ Dahi	3:08
3.	"Useless" (featuring Asher Roth)	Blended Babies	4:38
4.	"Move On"	Like; DJ Dahi	3:51
5.	"She" (featuring TiRon)	Cook Classics	4:33
6.	"Chaos (The Recipe)"	Swiff D	4:13
7.	"Life Is Good"	Swiff D	3:11
8.	"High Five"	Like	4:32
9.	"Top Down" (featuring Casey Veggies and Skeme)	Swiff D	4:20
10.	"Number 1"	Like; DJ Dahi	4:50
11.	"Brown"	Like	3:42
12.	"Thank You"	Swiff D	3:21
13.	"Posted" (Remix)	Micky Park	3:06
14.	"Useless (Remix)" (featuring Bleu Collar)	Blended Babies	4:55
15.	"Number 1.1" (Remix)	Like	4:35
