= Sing About Me, I'm Dying of Thirst =

Song by Kendrick Lamar

from the album Good Kid, M.A.A.D City
- Released: October 22, 2012
- Recorded: 2012
- Genre: West Coast hip-hop; jazz rap; neo soul
- Length: 12:04
- Label: Top Dawg; Aftermath; Interscope
- Songwriters: Kendrick Duckworth; Gabriel Stevenson; Derrick Hutchins; Quincy Jones; Alan Bergman; Marilyn Bergman
- Producers: 'Sing About Me' produced by Like 'I'm Dying of Thirst' produced by: Skhye Hutch; Sounwave (add.)

Audio video
- "Sing About Me, I'm Dying of Thirst" on YouTube

"Sing About Me, I'm Dying of Thirst" is a song by American rapper Kendrick Lamar, from his second studio album Good Kid, M.A.A.D City (2012). The song, which appears as the tenth track on the album, is Kendrick Lamar's longest song, lasting twelve minutes and four seconds. The song is split into two parts, the first part, titled "Sing About Me", which is about seven minutes, and the second part, titled "I'm Dying of Thirst", which is approximately two minutes and fifty-seconds. A skit occurs between the two parts and another one after the second section. The final skit also features poet Maya Angelou. "Sing About Me" samples Grant Green's "Maybe Tomorrow" and the drum break from the track "Use Me" by Bill Withers, while "I'm Dying of Thirst" samples the Singers Unlimited cover of "My Romance".

The song garnered critical acclaim for Lamar's emotional lyricism and creative approach to self-critique as well as rapping verses from the perspectives of various characters that had appeared on his previous album, Section.80, and songs on Good Kid, M.A.A.D City itself.

== Critical reception ==
"Sing About Me, I'm Dying of Thirst" has received widespread acclaim from critics and listeners since its release. Pitchfork described the song as a "stunning 12-minute denouement in which Lamar delivers a verse from a peripheral character that is the album's most dazzling stroke of empathy." In a review of Lamar's fourth studio album Damn, Teddy Craven of The Daily Campus compared "Sing About Me" to "Duckworth", saying both songs are "the high-points of their respective albums."

== Media appearances ==
The song, in particular "I'm Dying of Thirst", was featured in the American television series Grey's Anatomy at the end of the 2013 episode "Man on the Moon".
