= Duckworth (song) =

2017 song by Kendrick Lamar

Song by Kendrick Lamar

from the album Damn
- Recorded: Mid 2016
- Studio: Windmark Studios, Jungle City Studios
- Genre: West Coast hip-hop, boom bap
- Length: 4:09
- Label: Top Dawg; Aftermath; Interscope
- Songwriters: Kendrick Duckworth; Patrick Douthit
- Producers: 9th Wonder; Bēkon (add.)

"Duckworth" (stylized in all-caps) is a song by the American rapper Kendrick Lamar, taken from his fourth album Damn, released on April 14, 2017. The lyrics were written by Lamar while the music was written by the record producer 9th Wonder, with additional production by Bēkon.

The song title is Lamar's surname. The song tells the true story of Lamar's father meeting Anthony "Top Dawg" Tiffith, working at a Kentucky Fried Chicken in a rough area, years before Lamar was signed to his record label. Anthony was renowned for robbing chicken shops, similar to the one Lamar's father had been working at, so Duckworth decided to give Anthony two extra biscuits every time he came in. This caused Anthony to like Duckworth and leave him alive when he robbed the shop. If it were not for this decision, Kendrick would never have met Anthony and gotten signed to his label, and therefore his music career may have never taken off.

Although the song was not released as a single, it appeared on five charts, including hitting number 63 on the Billboard Hot 100 and earning its highest position at number 36 on the Hot R&B/Hip-Hop Songs chart. The song would also be certified Platinum by the Australian Recording Industry Association (ARIA), alongside certifying Silver by the British Phonographic Industry (BPI) and certifying Gold by three organizations, including the Recording Industry Association of America (RIAA).

== Lyrics ==
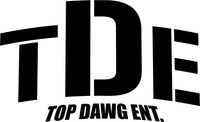
Top Dawg Entertainment, the record label formed by Anthony "Top Dawg" Tiffith, who would sign Kendrick Lamar to the label in 2005, which would have not happened if he shot Lamar's father

The song uses storytelling to tell the connection of Lamar with his father, Kenny "Ducky" Duckworth, and his Top Dawg label-boss, Anthony "Top Dawg" Tiffith. Specifically, the song tells the story about Top Dawg's previous encounters with Ducky, many years prior to Top Dawg signing Lamar to his label.

More specifically, it tells the story of how Top Dawg and Ducky were gangbangers. When he was younger, Top Dawg frequented the Kentucky Fried Chicken restaurant at which Ducky worked; this is the same location that had been robbed a few years prior, and a customer was shot. Ducky was aware of this and Top Dawg's intentions, deciding that he should get on Top Dawg's good side. He does this by giving him free chicken and extra biscuits every time he pulled into the drive-thru. This act of good will was so successful that Top Dawg decided not to hold up the restaurant after all. The song ends with Lamar stating that if it weren't for these events and circumstances, he would have died in a gunfight without the positive influence of his father, and Top Dawg would be serving life in prison for the murder instead of founding his record label.

The song, like "Fear", another track from Damn, incorporates "backwards vocals", also known as backmasking. Fans and critics noticed this as an inspiration taken from filmmaker David Lynch's work, most notably from the TV series Twin Peaks (1990–1991), and also as Lamar previously filmed the short-film God Is Gangsta from his album To Pimp a Butterfly (2015), in the Paris club "Le Silencio", which was designed by Lynch, Raphael Navot, architectural agency Enia and light designer Thierry Dreyfus.

== Critical reception ==
Teddy Craven of The Daily Campus described "Duckworth" as Damn's "strongest song" and "ends the album with a fantastic philosophical mic-drop." Craven compared the track to "Sing About Me, I'm Dying of Thirst" from Lamar's second studio album Good Kid, M.A.A.D City, a song that also tells personal stories about the unexpected consequences of Lamar's music. Writing for Pitchfork, Matthew Trammel described the song as "a precious origin story, the stuff of rock docs and hood DVDs, and it’s delivered with such precision, vivid detail, and masterful pacing that it can’t possibly be true. But it’s a tale too strange to be fiction, and too powerful not to believe in—just like its author."

The song attracted attention of media in the former Yugoslavia due to its sample of "Ostavi trag" ("Leave a Mark") by the Yugoslav jazz-rock band September.

== Credits and personnel ==
Credits adapted from the official Damn digital booklet.

- Kendrick Duckworth – songwriter
- Patrick Douthit – songwriter, producer, mixing
- Bēkon – additional production, additional vocals
- Kid Capri – additional vocals
- Derek Ali – mixing
- Tyler Page – mixing, mix assistant
- Cyrus Taghipour – mix assistant
- Zeke Mishanec – additional recording
- Brendan Silas Perry – additional recording

== Charts ==
Chart (2017)	Peak position
Canada Hot 100 (Billboard)	52
Ireland (IRMA)	52
Portugal (AFP)	56
Slovakia Singles Digital (ČNS IFPI)	76
Sweden Heatseeker (Sverigetopplistan)	7
UK Singles (Official Charts)	80
US Billboard Hot 100	63
US Hot R&B/Hip-Hop Songs (Billboard)	36

== Certifications ==
Region	Certification	Certified units/sales
Australia (ARIA)	Platinum	70,000^{‡}
Canada (Music Canada)	Gold	40,000^{‡}
New Zealand (RMNZ)	Platinum	30,000^{‡}
United Kingdom (BPI)	Silver	200,000^{‡}
United States (RIAA)	Gold	500,000^{‡}
^{‡} Sales+streaming figures based on certification alone.
