= Johnson&Jonson =

Studio album by Johnson&Jonson
- Released: September 23, 2008 (retail)
- Recorded: 2006–08
- Genre: Hip-hop; alternative hip-hop
- Label: Tres Records
- Producer: Mainframe

Johnson&Jonson chronology
Johnson&Jonson (2008)	It’s a Art (2010)

Professional ratings
Review scores
Source	Rating
Pitchfork	8.4/10
RapReviews	8.5/10

Johnson&Jonson is the debut studio album from American hip-hop duo, Johnson&Jonson (Blu and Mainframe). It was released on September 23, 2008, by Tres Records.

== Background ==
The album was originally named Powders & Oils and had 21 tracks instead of 16. The Powders & Oils mix is expected to be officially released sometime in the future, as well as "Kinda' Busty" 12", "Mama Told Me"/"Hold On John" 12", and "The Only Way/"Half A Knot" 12".

== Track listing ==
No.	Title	Length
1.	"J & J"	4:21
2.	"Up All Night"	4:38
3.	"Half A Knot"	2:25
4.	"Mama Told Me"	2:30
5.	"The Gusto Room" (featuring Bobo Lamb)	3:22
6.	"Wow!"	3:06
7.	"Only Way"	2:25
8.	"In the Building" (featuring Miguel)	1:51
9.	"Bout It, Bout It"	1:55
10.	"Spell Check"	3:39
11.	"Long Time Gone"	2:46
12.	"Still Up All Night" (featuring Co$$ Dollars)	1:24
13.	"A Perfect Picture"	3:20
14.	"Anything Is Possible" (featuring Gonjasufi)	2:20
15.	"The Oath"	2:07
16.	"Hold on John" (featuring John Lennon)	3:12
