= Los Angeles (Blu and Evidence album) =

Studio album by Blu and Evidence
- Released: July 12, 2024
- Recorded: 2023–24
- Genres: West Coast hip-hop; jazz rap
- Length: 40:50
- Label: Bigger Picture Recordings
- Producer: Evidence

Blu chronology
abc (2024)	Los Angeles (2024)	Love (the) Ominous World (2024)

Evidence chronology
Squirrel Tape Instrumentals, Vol. 3 (2024)	Los Angeles (2024)	Unlearning Vol. 2 (2025)

Singles from Los Angeles
- 1. "Lost Angel" Released: June 14, 2024; 2. "Wild Wild West" Released: July 9, 2024

Los Angeles is a studio album by American rapper Blu, entirely produced by rapper/producer Evidence. It was released on July 12, 2024, featuring Domo Genesis, Kokane, MED, Navy Blue, Cashus King, Self Jupiter, Propaganda, Nana, C.S. Armstrong and Evidence himself. The album received positive reviews from critics.

== Background and promotion ==
On June 14, 2024, Blu and Evidence debuted their collaborative song "Lost Angel". Despite such recent collaboration, they have established their careers, which Blu is an underground Californian rapper who has made an extensive amount of projects and collaborations for over 20 years, while Evidence is a rapper-producer who is a member of the rap group Dilated Peoples and one-half of the rap duo Step Brothers with The Alchemist.

The music video for "Lost Angel" was shot by Blu, visualizing familiar landmarks of Los Angeles. As he describes the album, "This album is dedicated to L.A., and everybody who helped me get home. Every step of the way."

On September 13, 2024, Blu and Evidence appeared on Genius Verified to discuss the lyrics and meaning of one of the album's tracks, "The Land"

== Music and themes ==
The main theme of Los Angeles centers on the city of the same name, which Blu "calls home." The first track, "Live from 54th", shows Blu rapping at a rap showcase: he spits a verse, says where he's from, and asks again where he's from. The second track, "The Land", details a harsh view of the city, being a place where "Your man could catch a cap with his teeth / if he ever tried to come at me with beef." It themes around the criminal side of Los Angeles: killer cops, gang rivalry, drug dealing, and also a nod to West Coast hip-hop group Cypress Hill. The third track, "Los Angeles", further explores the depictions of Los Angeles, with ballers, taggers, and actresses referenced, under various samples from news reports.

The fourth track, "Three Wheel Motion", features long-time American rapper Kokane, as it gives "some intense psychedelic, woozy vibes." On the sixth track, "LA Traffic", featuring Cashus King and Self Jupiter, there's a chorus reference to the problematic traffic in the city. The seventh and eighth tracks, "The Cold" and "Hell", show Blu painting Los Angeles as "a place of contrast and contradictions," as well as its portrayal of the city as a cruel and exploitative place.

The ninth track, "Heaven", details Blu writing a letter to himself from the perspective of a deceased friend who went to Heaven. The theme continues on the tenth track, "Wish You Were Here", amplifying the emotional themes with mourning. The eleventh track, "Lights at Night", features Domo Genesis and Navy Blue with "near drumless jazz fusiony loop bits hanging in the background." The twelfth track, "Wild Wild West", is a chipmunk soul song, still detailing the dangers of Los Angeles. The thirteenth and final track, "The LA", wraps it up but doesn't leave a clear conclusion.

== Critical reception ==
Professional ratings
Review scores
Source	Rating
The Needle Drop	7/10 (Note: Specifically, Fantano rated the album a "decent to strong 7.")

Los Angeles received positive reviews from music critics. In Anthony Fantano's review of the album, he considers Los Angeles as a "pretty decent" album, but felt mixed on its structure due to not enough substance, versatility, and commentary, giving the album a "decent to strong 7." In 2024, pop culture website The Ringer ranked it at number 28 of "The Ringer’s 30 Best Albums of 2024." Speaking of the album, "Sonically, Los Angeles is a tribute to the underground sound of the region—it’s fitting that the best track, “The Land,” not only flips the same sample as Cypress Hill’s “Hand on the Pump” but also features an extended interlude from DJ Muggs."

Evan Baxter-Carr of Trillmag also ranks the album number 10 on its list, "Top 10 Hip Hop Albums Of 2024 (So Far):" "From the highs of making it in the music scene to the lows of cutthroat Hollywood culture, Blu covers a range of topics with poetic rhymes and an arsenal of passionate flows. All performed over some summery beats from Evidence, the laidback grooves of Los Angeles transport the listener to California."

== Track listing ==
Los Angeles track listing
No.	Title	Writer(s)	Length
1.	"Live from 54th"	John Barnes III; Michael Perretta	1:43
2.	"The Land"	Barnes III; Perretta	3:42
3.	"Los Angeles" (featuring Nana)	Barnes III; Perretta; Nana Opong	3:04
4.	"Three Wheel Motion" (featuring Kokane)	Barnes III; Perretta; Jerry Long Jr.	4:02
5.	"LA Tourists" (featuring MED)	Barnes III; Perretta; Nicholas Rodriguez	3:56
6.	"LA Traffic" (featuring Cashus King and Self Jupiter)	Barnes III; Perretta; Troy Johnson; Ornette Glenn	3:35
7.	"The Cold"	Barnes III; Perretta	3:44
8.	"Hell" (featuring Propaganda)	Barnes III; Perretta; Jason Petty	3:31
9.	"Heaven" (featuring C.S. Armstrong)	Barnes III; Perretta; Chauncy Armstong	2:49
10.	"Wish You Were Here"	Barnes III; Perretta	2:14
11.	"Lights at Night" (featuring Domo Genesis and Navy Blue)	Barnes III; Perretta; Dominique Cole; Sage Elsesser	3:12
12.	"Wild Wild West"	Barnes III; Perretta	2:39
13.	"The LA"	Barnes III; Perretta	2:35
Total length:			31:25
