= Jesus (Blu album) =

J e s u s

Studio album by Blu
- Released: July 2, 2011
- Genre: Hip-hop; lo-fi
- Label: New World Color
- Producer: Blu; Knxwledge; Rome; the Alchemist; Madlib; Hezekiah

Blu chronology
Her Favorite Colo(u)r (2011)	J e s u s (2011)	York (2013)

Jesus, stylized as j e s u s, is the second studio album by American rapper Blu. It was released on July 2, 2011 under the pseudonym B. It later saw an official release under Blu's own label, New World Color, on August 30, 2011. The album is notable for being the only project featuring beats from producers The Alchemist, Madlib, and Knxwledge all on one project.

== Reception ==
Jesus received a 7.5 rating from Rapreviews.com, and was reviewed by HHV Mag.

== Track listing ==
No.	Title	Producer	Length
1.	"newshit (Introlude)"	Blu
2.	"whatifiwas"	Rome
3.	"ontheporch"	Rome
4.	"lucky"	Blu
5.	"dmv"	Blu
6.	"burgandy"	Hezekiah
7.	"4u"	Knxwledge
8.	"doowhop" (featuring Planet Asia and Killa Ben)	The Alchemist
9.	"birdznbeez"	Rome
10.	"jesus"	Madlib
11.	"dotheknxwledge (Outrolude)"	Knxwledge
