= Mibbs =

American rapper

MiBBs
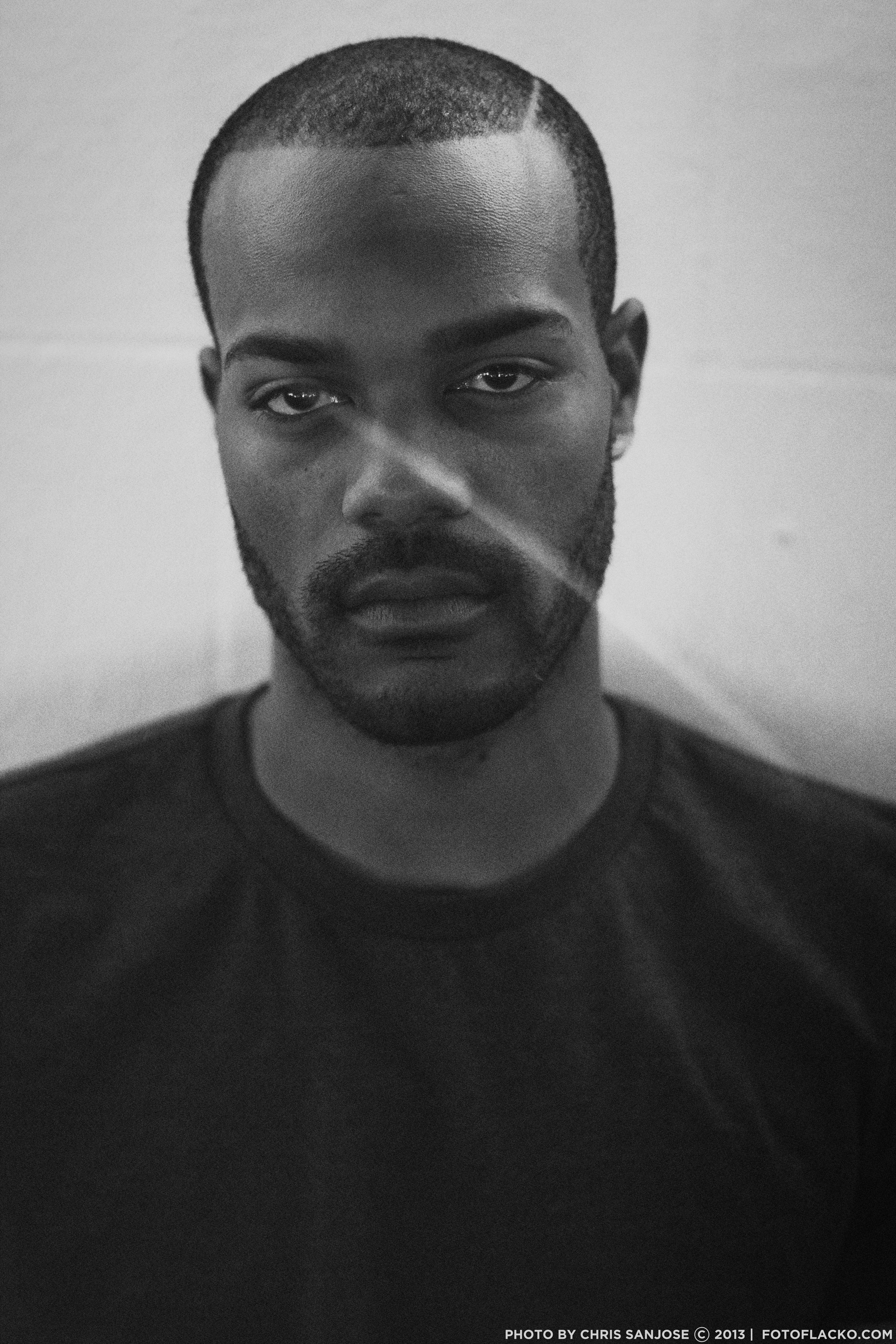

Background information
- Born: Michael Stevenson; Los Angeles, California, U.S.
- Genres: Hip hop
- Occupations: Rapper; songwriter
- Instrument: Vocals
- Years active: 2006–present
- Labels: Universal (2008–2011); RBC (2011–present)
- Member of: Pac Div
- Website: mibbsovereverything.com

Michael Stevenson, better known as his stage name Mibbs (often styled MiBBs) is an American hip hop recording artist best known for his work with Pac Div (along with his brother Like and BeYoung), a rap trio from Southern California, and former signees of Universal Motown Records.

== Career ==
After initial success with Pac Div, 2013 saw Mibbs start creating music individually. His debut EP, FREEBASS, premiered on Spin.com on June 18, 2013, and his first video, "SUPWITHAT", directed by Travis Barker's own Jayson Fox, premiered the following afternoon on BET'S 106 & Park. His second video, "Rollin'", directed by feature film director Tommy O'Haver, premiered July 2, 2013 on Billboard.com and his third video, "Freebass", premiered on Hypebeast's music website, Hypetrak.com. His solo buzz continued to grow with his freestyle appearance on BET's The Backroom in September 2013. The upcoming year brings five more EPs produced by WoodysProduce, MC Tree G, house music veteran C Penn, DertBeats and Mike Free, with features from Bad Lucc, Deniro Farrar, Boldy James, Polo Donatello, and many more.

January 2014, the Freebass EP was released on iTunes as FREEBASSkg featuring two new songs ("Mr. Knowitall" and "Offtop"). Additionally, The Program, a five-track EP with producer WoodysProduce, featuring Bad Lucc, Deniro Farrar and newcomer, Kentucky native, Polo Donatello were also released on iTunes. A Deluxe edition featuring all seven tracks from Freebasskg is also available.

In November 2014, Mibbs song "No New Leaders" was featured on the soundtrack for Justin Simien's debut film Dear White People. The song is also played during the end credits of the movie.

== Discography ==
- Freebasskg (2013)
- The Program (2014)
