= Nottz =

American hip-hop producer

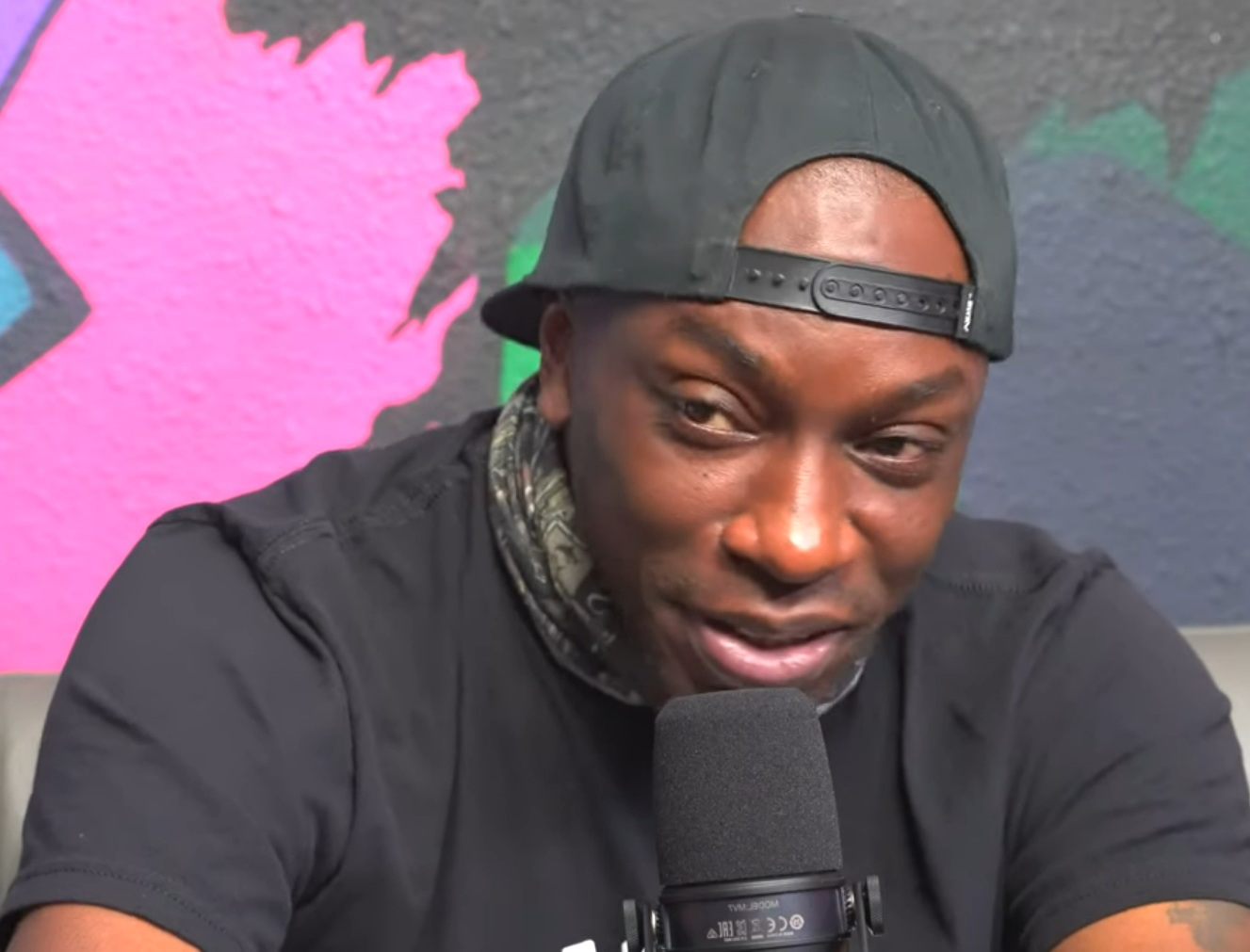

Background information
- Also known as: Nottz Raw
- Born: Dominick J. Lamb; February 21, 1977 (age 49)
- Origin: Norfolk, Virginia, U.S.
- Genres: Hip-hop
- Occupations: Record producer; rapper
- Years active: 1997–present
- Labels: Teamsta Entertainment, LLC.; DMP; Raw Koncept; Jamla

Dominick J. Lamb (born February 21, 1977), better known by his stage name Nottz (or Nottz Raw), is an American hip-hop producer and rapper from Norfolk, Virginia.

== Life and career ==
Some of Nottz's earliest production work was on the Rawkus Records compilation Lyricist Lounge, Volume One, in 1998. From there he landed three tracks on Busta Rhymes' Extinction level Event LP, after Rhymes stumbled across one of his beat tapes.

Like many other hip-hop producers to emerge before the 2000s, Nottz samples from old (primarily soul) records and film soundtracks to reconstruct new beats. West Coast hip-hop icon, Dr. Dre, has named Nottz as one of his favorite producers, and has selected him as one of the few guest producers on his much delayed, yet anticipated Detox album that never was released.

Nottz assisted in the production of the singer Bilal's second album, Love for Sale.

Nottz has a group called D.M.P., which stands for "Durte Muzik Prahdukshun". They released an EP in 2004, a full-length album on Koch Records, titled Nottz Presents D.M.P., in 2005 and an album titled God Made Durt in 2013, under Raw Koncept.

In 2010, Nottz released his first solo album, You Need This Music, under Raw Koncept. The album features Nottz as an MC, as well as a producer. Nottz also worked with rapper Asher Roth on the collaborative Rawth EP, released as a free download, on December 27, 2010, under Raw Koncept and School Boy.

In 2011, Nottz worked with The Game on his fourth album The R.E.D. Album, after having three of his beats on The Game's two previous albums Doctor's Advocate and LAX. On June 15, 2012, Nottz and Kardinal Offishall released the collaborative mixtape A.M.T.R.I.M., which was offered as a free download.

In 2013, Blu and Nottz Raw released their collaborative EP, Gods in the Spirit. That same year, Nottz worked with Kanye West to produce Pusha T's Nosetalgia, which features fellow rapper Kendrick Lamar.

On August 9, 2014, 9th Wonder announced that Nottz became a part of The Soul Council production team. A longtime admirer of his production work, 9th Wonder has spoken very highly of Nottz in the past. In 2010, he referred to Nottz as "the best beat maker on Earth right now" and claiming him as "the best producer in the game".

== Discography ==
=== Studio and collaborative albums ===
- You Need This Music (2010, Raw Koncept/Traffic)
- Home Sweet Home (with Rapper Big Pooh, 2015, Mello Music Group)
- Uno (with Umse, 2020)
- Afrika (with Blu, 2023, Nature Sounds)
- Sounds of Meadowbrook (2023)

=== Extended plays and notable projects ===
- Rawth (with Asher Roth, free EP, 2010)
