= J*Davey =

American music duo

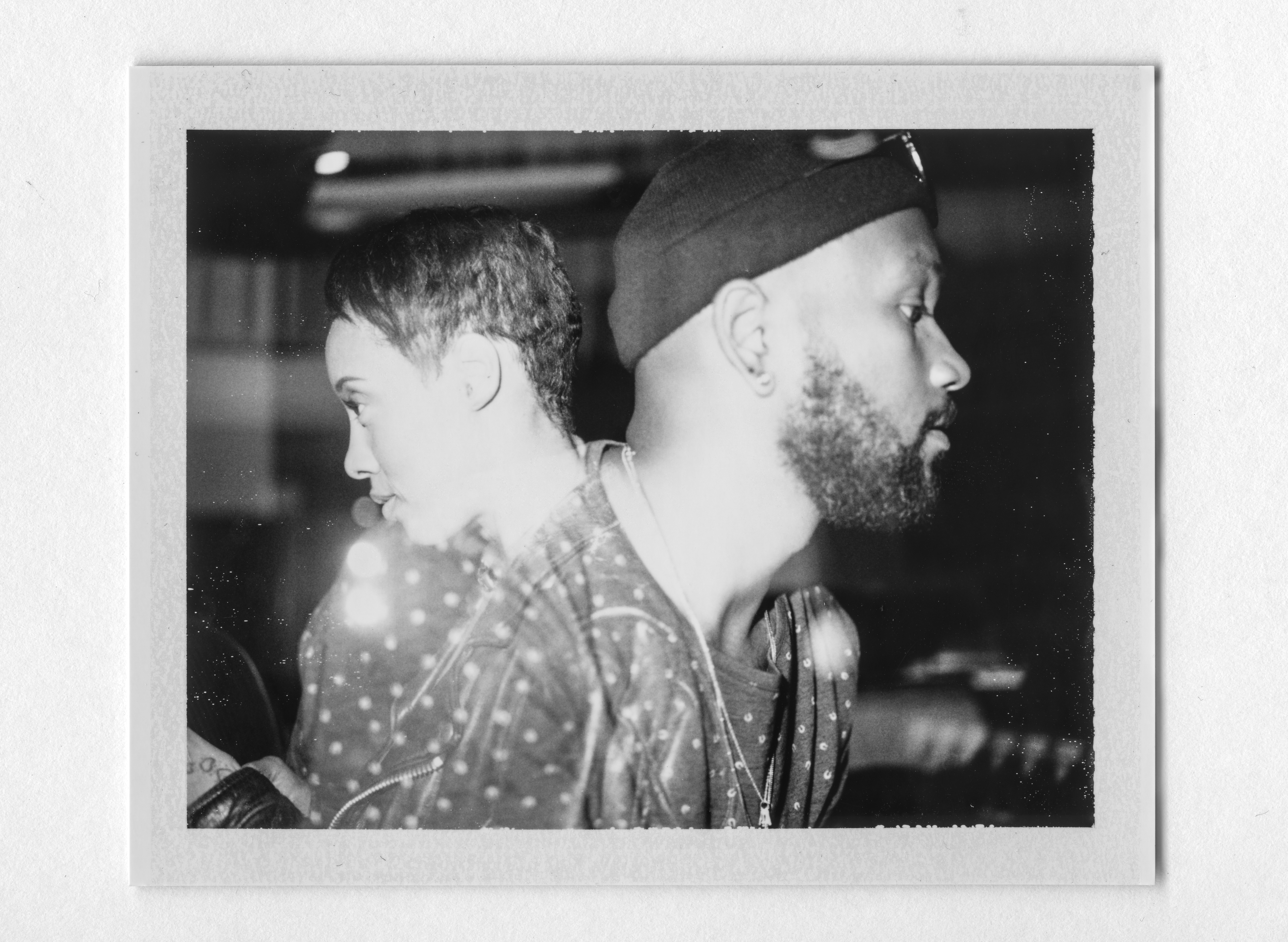
- J*Davey: photo by Anthony Williams

Background information
- Also known as: J*DaVeY; J Davey
- Origin: Los Angeles, California, U.S.
- Genres: New wave; funk; electronic; hip hop; R&B; alternative R&B; progressive soul
- Years active: 2000s–present
- Label: LEAU TECH (2008–present)
- Members: Jack Davey; D'LEAU
- Website: Official website

J*Davey is an American music duo from Los Angeles, California. The group consists of vocalist Jack Davey and artist/producer D'LEAU, who formed the act after being introduced by a mutual friend in high school.

== Background ==
J*Davey is an American music duo from Los Angeles, California, consisting of vocalist Jack Davey and artist/producer D'LEAU. The duo formed around 2000 after meeting through a mutual friend in high school.

Drawing from funk, new wave, electronic music, hip-hop, and R&B, J*Davey are regarded as pioneers of dark R&B and alternative R&B. Their 2008 double EP The Beauty in Distortion / The Land of the Lost is frequently cited as an early influence on the development of progressive R&B.

The duo gained early recognition through Myspace in the mid-2000s, reaching influential figures including Prince and BBC broadcaster Gilles Peterson. After signing with Warner Bros. Records, J*Davey entered a period of reduced activity before returning with new material in 2015. D'LEAU spent much of this period as music director for Miguel, touring alongside artists including Alicia Keys, Mary J. Blige, Bruno Mars, and Drake. The duo has since continued recording and performing, including a reunion appearance at Solange Knowles' Eldorado Ballroom series at Walt Disney Concert Hall in October 2024.

== Band members ==
- Jack Davey - vocals, songwriter
- D'LEAU - keyboards, producer

=== Collaborators ===
- Thundercat - bass guitar

== Discography ==
=== Albums ===
- The Beauty in Distortion/The Land of the Lost (July 1, 2008 - Interdependent Media)
- New Designer Drug (November 22, 2011 - ILLAV8R) re-released (2015)

=== EPs ===
- Boudoir Synema (2009)
- Evil Christian Cop (2011)
- Rookie (2014)
- POMP (2015)
- Lite Wait Life (2016)

=== 2024 Eldorado Ballroom ===
In October 2024, J*Davey reunited for a performance at the Eldorado Ballroom series, curated by Solange Knowles for Saint Heron in partnership with the Los Angeles Philharmonic at Walt Disney Concert Hall. The three-night series ran October 10, 12, and 13, honoring the legacy of Black experimental performance across generations. J*Davey appeared on the second night, titled "Contrapuntal Counterpoints (Experiments in Funk, Soul, and Jazz)," marking their first public reunion since 2016. Their set included catalog highlights "This One," "Raincheck," and "Get Together," with Thundercat joining on bass. The Eldorado Ballroom 2024 book, published by Saint Heron Press and edited by Solange Knowles, features a post-series conversation with J*Davey.

=== 2025 shows ===
In December 2025, J*Davey performed two sold-out shows, one in Los Angeles and one in New York City.

== Legacy and influence ==
J*Davey are widely cited as pioneers of what has been variously termed dark R&B and alternative R&B. Their 2008 double EP The Beauty in Distortion / The Land of the Lost is frequently referenced as a foundational work in the development of progressive R&B, predating the genre's mainstream recognition and influencing a generation of artists including The Internet, Steve Lacy, Thundercat, and Ravyn Lenae.

The duo's early adoption of Myspace as a distribution platform in the mid-2000s allowed their music to reach influential figures on both sides of the Atlantic, including Prince and BBC radio broadcaster Gilles Peterson. Their music has been featured in film and television productions including Forever (Netflix), CSI: NY, Entourage, and Snoop Dogg's Bossin' Up.
