= Pac Div =

American hip hop group

- Also known as: Pacific Division
- Origin: Los Angeles, California, United States
- Genres: Hip hop; underground hip hop
- Years active: 2006–present
- Labels: Universal Motown; RBC
- Members: Like; Mibbs; BeYoung

Pacific Division, better known as Pac Div is an American hip hop quartet from Southern California. Formed by brothers Like and Mibbs, Pac Div started rhyming together in high school. Originally an eleven-member crew, it shrank to three members in 2005.

== Career ==
Pac Div's first mixtape, Sealed for Freshness: The Blend Tape, along with their first video, F.A.T Boys, was released in 2006. Focusing on their lives, adolescence and experiences in Southern California, their music garnered them mentions in magazines including Billboard, Rolling Stone, The Source, VIBE and XXL. It also gained the attention of hip-hop acts Ludacris, ?uestlove, Pharrell Williams, Talib Kweli, 9th Wonder and more. Their continued success drew international attention as they opened for acts such as Nas, Q-Tip, Busta Rhymes, Ice-T, Ludacris and N.E.R.D.

A few years following the release of Sealed for Freshness: The Blend Tape, the group released two more mixtapes, Church League Champions and Don't Mention It. Don't Mention It contained the track, "Don't Forget the Swishers," featuring rapper Chip tha Ripper. In the Spring of 2011, the trio teamed up with Grand Hustle Management and released their fourth mixtape, Mania!, hosted by DJ Don Cannon, featuring the single, “Anti-freeze”. With over a million downloads, Mania! is their most successful mixtape to date.

In 2011, Pac Div left Motown Universal and released their debut album, The Div, independently through their own label, The Div and RBC Records. This featured contributions from Blu Collar, Asher Roth, Casey Veggies and Skeme. Pac Div appeared in their first nationally televised commercial for Phiten Athletics, featuring the group’s performance of their song, "Flexin", as well as appearances by NBA stars Carmelo Anthony, Chris Bosh, Eric Gordon and Derrick Williams. The group closed out the year touring with Mac Miller on his BlueSlide Park Tour. In late 2012, Pac Div released their second album, G.M.B, on November 27, 2012 with features from Mac Miller and Kendrick Lamar and production from Scoop DeVille, Swiff D, DJ Dahi and the group’s own Like. The group wrapped up the year touring with Snoop Dogg.

== Discography ==
Studio albums

- The DiV (2011)
- GMB (2012)
- First Baptist (2018)
- Still Sealed, Vol. 1 (2026)

EPs

- Pac Div EP (2009)

Mixtapes

- Sealed for Freshness: The Blend Tape (2006)
- Church League Champions (2009)
- Don't Mention It (2010)
- Mania! (2011)
